= 2000–01 Oldham Athletic A.F.C. season =

Oldham Athletic
2000–01 season
- Chairman: David Brierley
- Manager: Andy Ritchie
- Stadium: Boundary Park
- Second Division: 15th
- FA Cup: Second round
- League Cup: Second round
- Football League Trophy: First round (Northern Area)
- Top goalscorer: League: Duxbury (8); All: Duxbury (10)
- Highest home attendance: 9,359 vs. Stoke City
- Lowest home attendance: 2,551 vs. Wigan Athletic
- Average home league attendance: 4,972
Home colours	Away colours

These are the details of the 2000–01 Oldham Athletic A.F.C. season, who competed in the Football League Second Division.

== Season summary ==
Hopes were high for the Latics at the start of the 2000–01 season after a 4–1 opening day win at home to newly relegated Port Vale, but a run of 11 games without a win saw the club slump to second bottom in the league, making relegation look a real possibility. The signings of veteran winger David Eyres and midfielder Tony Carss gave the side added impetus and the Latics recovered well to again finish comfortably mid-table.

== Final league table ==
Pos	Team	Pld	W	D	L	GF	GA	GD	Pts
13	Wycombe Wanderers	46	15	14	17	46	53	−7	59
14	Brentford	46	14	17	15	56	70	−14	59
15	Oldham Athletic	46	15	13	18	53	65	−12	58
16	Bury	46	16	10	20	45	59	−14	58
17	Colchester United	46	15	12	19	55	59	−4	57

Rules for classification: 1) Points; 2) Goal difference; 3) Goals scored

== Results ==
Oldham Athletic's score comes first

=== Legend ===
Win	Draw	Loss

=== Football League Second Division ===
Date	Opponent	Venue	Result	Attendance	Scorers
12 August 2000	Port Vale	H	4–1	5,639	Adams, Allott, Corazzin, Garnett
19 August 2000	Walsall	A	2–3	5,952	Adams, Duxbury
26 August 2000	Peterborough United	H	1–4	4,967	Tipton
29 August 2000	Colchester United	A	1–1	3,675	Holt
2 September 2000	Notts County	H	0–1	4,424	
9 September 2000	Wrexham	A	1–3	3,527	Corazzin
12 September 2000	Reading	A	0–5	7,768	
16 September 2000	Bristol City	H	0–0	4,095	
23 September 2000	Bournemouth	A	1–1	3,976	Allott
30 September 2000	Cambridge United	H	1–3	3,888	Holt
8 October 2000	Rotherham United	A	0–3	3,774	
14 October 2000	Swindon Town	H	1–0	4,009	Dudley
17 October 2000	Wycombe Wanderers	H	2–0	3,496	Dudley (2)
21 October 2000	Northampton Town	A	1–2	5,677	Dudley
28 October 2000	Bristol Rovers	A	2–0	6,110	Allott, Duxbury
4 November 2000	Swansea City	H	1–1	4,282	Jones
11 November 2000	Stoke City	A	1–0	12,503	Duxbury
25 November 2000	Millwall	H	0–1	4,779	
2 December 2000	Oxford United	H	3–2	3,986	Corazzin, Eyres, Jones
16 December 2000	Bury	A	1–1	4,976	Boshell
23 December 2000	Brentford	A	1–1	5,317	Allott
26 December 2000	Wigan Athletic	H	2–1	7,750	Duxbury, Allott
30 December 2000	Walsall	H	0–0	5,267	
1 January 2001	Peterborough United	A	0–0	5,039	
6 January 2001	Port Vale	A	0–0	4,313	
13 January 2001	Colchester United	H	1–1	4,076	Tipton
20 January 2001	Wigan Athletic	A	1–3	8,274	Sheridan
23 January 2001	Luton Town	H	2–0	3,011	Rickers, Sheridan
27 January 2001	Brentford	H	3–0	4,964	Eyres, Allott (2)
3 February 2001	Notts County	A	0–1	5,212	
10 February 2001	Wrexham	H	5–1	4,703	Corazzin (4 – 1 pen), Rickers
20 February 2001	Reading	H	0–2	4,160	
24 February 2001	Bournemouth	H	2–1	4,845	Sheridan (pen), Tipton
3 March 2001	Cambridge United	A	0–2	3,762	
6 March 2001	Swindon Town	A	0–3	4,168	
10 March 2001	Rotherham United	H	2–3	5,993	Duxbury (2)
17 March 2001	Wycombe Wanderers	A	1–2	5,847	Tipton
23 March 2001	Northampton Town	H	2–1	4,001	Duxbury (2)
27 March 2001	Bristol City	A	2–2	9,568	Carss, Sheridan (pen)
31 March 2001	Bury	H	1–1	5,787	Tipton
7 April 2001	Oxford United	A	1–0	4,217	Eyres
14 April 2001	Luton Town	A	0–0	4,886	
16 April 2001	Bristol Rovers	H	1–0	6,883	Carss
21 April 2001	Swansea City	A	2–1	3,261	Parkin (2)
28 April 2001	Stoke City	H	1–2	9,359	Parkin
5 May 2001	Millwall	A	0–5	18,510	

=== FA Cup ===
Round	Date	Opponent	Venue	Result	Attendance	Goalscorers
R1	18 November 2000	Hednesford Town	A	4–2	2,053	Duxbury, Dudley, Corazzin, Tipton
R2	10 December 2000	Peterborough United	A	1–1	5,662	Dudley
R2R	19 December 2000	Peterborough United	H	0–1	3,404	

=== League Cup ===
Round	Date	Opponent	Venue	Result	Attendance	Goalscorers
R1 1st Leg	22 August 2000	Huddersfield Town	H	1–0	4,255	Corazzin
R1 2nd Leg	5 September 2000	Huddersfield Town	A	2–0 (won 3–0 on agg)	4,979	Rickers (2)
R2 1st Leg	19 September 2000	Sheffield Wednesday	H	1–3	3,213	Boshell
R2 2nd Leg	27 September 2000	Sheffield Wednesday	A	1–5 (lost 2–8 on agg)	4,773	Duxbury

=== Football League Trophy ===
Round	Date	Opponent	Venue	Result	Attendance	Goalscorers
Northern R1	9 January 2001	Wigan Athletic	H	2–3 (a.e.t.)	2,551	Salt, Tipton (pen)

== Players ==
=== First-team squad ===
Squad at end of season

Note: Flags indicate national team as defined under FIFA eligibility rules; some limited exceptions apply. Players may hold more than one non-FIFA nationality.

No.	Pos.	Nation	Player
1	GK	IRL	Gary Kelly (Note: Kelly was born in Preston, England, but also qualified to represent the Republic of Ireland internationally through his father and represented them at U-19, U-21, U-23, and B level.)
2	DF	SCO	Scott McNiven (Note: McNiven was born in Leeds, England, but also qualified to represent Scotland internationally through his father and represented them at U-21 level.)
3	DF	ENG	Andy Holt
4	DF	ENG	Shaun Garnett
6	MF	ENG	Lee Duxbury
7	MF	ENG	Paul Rickers
8	MF	IRL	John Sheridan (Note: Sheridan was born in Stretford, England, but also qualified to represent the Republic of Ireland internationally and represented them at U-21 level before making his international debut for the Republic of Ireland in 1988.)
9	FW	WAL	Matthew Tipton
10	FW	ENG	Sam Parkin (on loan from Chelsea)
11	MF	SCO	Mark Innes
12	FW	ENG	Mark Allott
13	GK	NIR	David Miskelly
14	MF	ENG	Phil Salt
15	MF	ENG	Danny Walsh

No.	Pos.	Nation	Player
16	FW	ENG	Ryan Sudgen
17	FW	ENG	Craig Dudley
18	MF	ENG	Danny Boshell
19	FW	CAN	Carlo Corazzin
20	MF	ENG	Mark Hotte
21	DF	IRL	Barry Prenderville
22	FW	ENG	Neville Roach
23	FW	ENG	Andy Ritchie (player-manager)
24	MF	ENG	Neil Adams
25	GK	ENG	Jamie Campbell
27	DF	ENG	Ben Futcher
28	MF	ENG	David Eyres
29	DF	ENG	Paul Jones
31	MF	ENG	Tony Carss

=== Left club during season ===
Note: Flags indicate national team as defined under FIFA eligibility rules; some limited exceptions apply. Players may hold more than one non-FIFA nationality.

No.	Pos.	Nation	Player
36	FW	ENG	Paul Beavers (to Darlington)
26	DF	ENG	Richard Graham (retired)
5	DF	ENG	Stuart Thom (to Scunthorpe United)
22	MF	ENG	Chris Lightfoot (on loan from Crewe Alexandra)

No.	Pos.	Nation	Player
30	MF	ENG	Paul Smith (on loan from Burnley)
26	DF	CAN	Mark Watson (released)
28	DF	ENG	Jordan Tait (to Darlington)
10	FW	ENG	Steve Whitehall (to Chester City)
