= 1999–2000 Oldham Athletic A.F.C. season =

Oldham Athletic
1999–2000 season
- Chairman: David Brierley
- Manager: Andy Ritchie
- Stadium: Boundary Park
- Second Division: 14th
- FA Cup: Third round
- League Cup: First round
- Football League Trophy: Second round
- Top goalscorer: League: Allott (10); All: Allott/Whitehall (11)
- Highest home attendance: 9,432 vs. Preston North End
- Lowest home attendance: 2,750 vs. Stockport County
- Average home league attendance: 5,391
Home colours	Away colours

During the 1999–2000 English football season, Oldham Athletic A.F.C. competed in the Football League Second Division.

== Season summary ==
In the 1999–2000 season, it began in disastrous fashion with the Latics losing their first five matches and failing to score in the first four. Ritchie's side however recovered well, proving difficult to beat, and losing only four of their nineteen remaining away matches, comfortably finishing in mid-table with 61 points from their 46 league matches.

== Final league table ==
Pos	Team	Pld	W	D	L	GF	GA	GD	Pts
12	Wycombe Wanderers	46	16	13	17	56	53	+3	61
13	Luton Town	46	17	10	19	61	65	−4	61
14	Oldham Athletic	46	16	12	18	50	55	−5	60
15	Bury	46	13	18	15	61	64	−3	57
16	Bournemouth	46	16	9	21	59	62	−3	57

Rules for classification: 1) Points; 2) Goal difference; 3) Goals scored

== Results ==
Oldham Athletic's score comes first

=== Legend ===
Win	Draw	Loss

=== Football League Second Division ===
Date	Opponent	Venue	Result	Attendance	Scorers
7 August 1999	Preston North End	H	0–1	9,432	
14 August 1999	Brentford	A	0–2	5,074	
21 August 1999	Burnley	H	0–1	8,543	
28 August 1999	Oxford United	A	0–1	5,098	
4 September 1999	Gillingham	A	1–2	5,884	S McNiven
11 September 1999	Bury	H	2–0	6,541	Allott, Duxbury
18 September 1999	Bristol Rovers	A	2–3	6,574	Sheridan, Allott
25 September 1999	Reading	A	1–1	7,274	Allott
2 October 1999	Notts County	H	1–2	5,143	Thom
9 October 1999	Luton Town	H	2–1	4,532	D McNiven, Allott
16 October 1999	Cardiff City	A	1–1	5,650	Graham
19 October 1999	Blackpool	A	2–1	3,845	Duxbury, Allott
23 October 1999	Reading	H	1–2	4,963	Dudley
2 November 1999	Wycombe Wanderers	H	2–2	3,807	Rickers, Whitehall
6 November 1999	Chesterfield	A	1–0	2,737	Adams
9 November 1999	Millwall	H	2–1	4,209	Dudley, Whitehall
14 November 1999	Colchester United	H	1–2	5,147	Dudley
23 November 1999	Bristol City	A	1–1	8,214	Allott
27 November 1999	Wrexham	H	0–0	4,963	
4 December 1999	Preston North End	A	0–2	10,970	
18 December 1999	Cambridge United	A	3–2	3,162	Allott, Adams, Duxbury
26 December 1999	Scunthorpe United	H	1–1	5,998	Whitehall
28 December 1999	Stoke City	A	0–0	13,709	
3 January 2000	Bournemouth	H	1–0	5,160	Allott
7 January 2000	Wigan Athletic	A	1–0	6,487	Duxbury
15 January 2000	Brentford	H	3–0	4,967	Holt, Allott (2, 1 pen)
22 January 2000	Burnley	A	0–3	12,391	
29 January 2000	Oxford United	H	2–0	4,780	Whitehall (2)
5 February 2000	Millwall	A	0–1	8,303	
12 February 2000	Gillingham	H	1–3	5,144	Garnett
19 February 2000	Wrexham	A	3–0	3,603	Graham, Whitehall, Dudley
26 February 2000	Bristol Rovers	H	1–4	5,839	Dudley
4 March 2000	Bury	A	2–2	5,306	Whitehall, Rickers
11 March 2000	Wycombe Wanderers	A	0–0	4,471	
18 March 2000	Bristol City	H	1–1	4,808	Whitehall
21 March 2000	Colchester United	A	1–0	3,282	Holt
25 March 2000	Scunthorpe United	A	2–1	3,807	Garnett, Rickers
1 April 2000	Cambridge United	H	1–0	4,988	Holt
4 April 2000	Stoke City	H	0–1	4,474	
8 April 2000	Bournemouth	A	0–3	3,808	
11 April 2000	Wigan Athletic	H	2–1	5,697	Tipton, Jones
18 April 2000	Chesterfield	H	1–2	4,012	Whitehall
22 April 2000	Cardiff City	H	1–2	4,549	Thom
24 April 2000	Notts County	A	1–0	3,728	Tipton
29 April 2000	Blackpool	H	1–1	6,290	Sugden
6 May 2000	Luton Town	A	1–1	5,963	Tipton (pen)

=== FA Cup ===
Round	Date	Opponent	Venue	Result	Attendance	Goalscorers
R1	30 October 1999	Chelmsford City	H	4–0	4,392	Dudley, Sheridan, Duxbury, Whitehall
R2	20 November 1999	Swansea City	H	1–0	4,332	Whitehall
R3	11 December 1999	Preston North End	A	1–2	9,940	Adams

=== League Cup ===
Round	Date	Opponent	Venue	Result	Attendance	Goalscorers
R1 1st Leg	10 August 1999	Stockport County	A	0–2	3,017	
R1 2nd Leg	24 August 1999	Stockport County	H	1–1 (lost 1–3 on agg)	2,885	Allott

=== Football League Trophy ===
Round	Date	Opponent	Venue	Result	Attendance	Goalscorers
R2N	18 January 2000	Stoke City	H	0–1	4,682	

== Players ==
=== First-team squad ===
Squad at end of season

Note: Flags indicate national team as defined under FIFA eligibility rules; some limited exceptions apply. Players may hold more than one non-FIFA nationality.

No.	Pos.	Nation	Player
1	GK	(Republic of Ireland) IRL	Gary Kelly (Note: Kelly was born in Preston, England, but also qualified to represent the Republic of Ireland internationally through his father and represented them at U-19, U-21, U-23, and B level.)
2	DF	(Scotland) SCO	Scott McNiven (Note: McNiven was born in Leeds, England, but also qualified to represent Scotland internationally through his father and represented them at U-21 level.)
3	DF	(England) ENG	Andy Holt
4	DF	(England) ENG	Shaun Garnett
5	DF	(England) ENG	Stuart Thom
6	MF	(England) ENG	Lee Duxbury
7	MF	(England) ENG	Paul Rickers
8	MF	(Republic of Ireland) IRL	John Sheridan (Note: Sheridan was born in Stretford, England, but also qualified to represent the Republic of Ireland internationally and represented them at U-21 level before making his international debut for the Republic of Ireland in 1988.)
9	FW	(Wales) WAL	Matthew Tipton
10	FW	(England) ENG	Steve Whitehall
11	MF	(Scotland) SCO	Mark Innes
12	FW	(England) ENG	Mark Allott
13	GK	(Northern Ireland) NIR	David Miskelly
14	MF	(England) ENG	Phil Salt
15	MF	(England) ENG	Danny Walsh

No.	Pos.	Nation	Player
16	FW	(England) ENG	Ryan Sugden
17	FW	(England) ENG	Craig Dudley
18	MF	(England) ENG	Danny Boshell
19	DF	(Scotland) SCO	Iain Swan
20	MF	(England) ENG	Mark Hotte
22	DF	(England) ENG	Ian McLean
23	FW	(England) ENG	Andy Ritchie (player-manager)
24	MF	(England) ENG	Neil Adams
26	DF	(England) ENG	Richard Graham
27	DF	(England) ENG	Ben Futcher
28	MF	(England) ENG	Darren Wardle
29	DF	(England) ENG	Paul Jones
30	DF	(England) ENG	Jordan Tait
36	FW	(England) ENG	Paul Beavers

=== Left club during season ===
Note: Flags indicate national team as defined under FIFA eligibility rules; some limited exceptions apply. Players may hold more than one non-FIFA nationality.

No.	Pos.	Nation	Player
21	FW	(England) ENG	David McNiven (to Southport)
25	MF	(England) ENG	John Mohan (released)

No.	Pos.	Nation	Player
25	FW	(Ghana) GHA	Junior Agogo (on loan from Sheffield Wednesday)
29	DF	(England) ENG	Lee Clitheroe (released)
