= 1998–99 Oldham Athletic A.F.C. season =

Oldham Athletic
1998–99 season
- Chairman: Ian Stott; David Brierley
- Manager: Andy Ritchie
- Stadium: Boundary Park
- Second Division: 20th
- FA Cup: Third round
- League Cup: First round
- Auto Windscreens Shield: First round
- Top goalscorer: League: Mark Allott; All: Mark Allott
Home colours	Away colours

During the 1998–99 English football season, Oldham Athletic A.F.C. competed in the Football League Second Division.

== Statistics ==
No.	Pos	Nat	Player	Total		Division 2		F.A. Cup		League Cup		League Trophy	
No.	Pos	Nat	Player	Apps	Goals	Apps	Goals	Apps	Goals	Apps	Goals	Apps	Goals
	MF	(England) ENG	Mark Allott	47	8	32+9	7	1+2	0	2+0	1	0+1	0
	FW	(England) ENG	Paul Beavers	7	2	7+0	2	0+0	0	0+0	0	0+0	0
	MF	(England) ENG	Lee Clitheroe	2	0	1+1	0	0+0	0	0+0	0	0+0	0
	MF	(England) ENG	Lee Duxbury	48	7	41+0	6	4+0	1	2+0	0	1+0	0
	DF	(England) ENG	Shaun Garnett	42	2	36+1	2	4+0	0	0+0	0	1+0	0
	DF	(England) ENG	Richard Graham	15	3	11+0	3	2+0	0	2+0	0	0+0	0
	FW	(Scotland) SCO	Andy Gray	4	0	4+0	0	0+0	0	0+0	0	0+0	0
	DF	(Australia) AUS	Doug Hodgson	1	0	0+1	0	0+0	0	0+0	0	0+0	0
	DF	(England) ENG	Andy Holt	50	5	39+4	5	3+1	0	2+0	0	1+0	0
	DF	(England) ENG	Mark Hotte	1	0	0+1	0	0+0	0	0+0	0	0+0	0
	MF	(Scotland) SCO	Mark Innes	13	1	8+5	1	0+0	0	0+0	0	0+0	0
	GK	(Republic of Ireland) IRL	Gary Kelly	52	0	45+0	0	4+0	0	2+0	0	1+0	0
	FW	(England) ENG	Adrian Littlejohn	18	3	11+5	2	0+0	0	2+0	1	0+0	0
	DF	(Wales) WAL	Paul Mardon	12	3	12+0	3	0+0	0	0+0	0	0+0	0
	FW	(Scotland) SCO	John McGinlay	10	3	4+3	1	1+1	2	0+0	0	1+0	0
	DF	(England) ENG	Ian McLean	5	0	5+0	0	0+0	0	0+0	0	0+0	0
	FW	(England) ENG	David McNiven	6	0	1+5	0	0+0	0	0+0	0	0+0	0
	DF	(Scotland) SCO	Scott McNiven	44	2	33+4	1	4+0	1	2+0	0	1+0	0
	GK	(Northern Ireland) NIR	David Miskelly	2	0	1+0	0	0+1	0	0+0	0	0+0	0
	MF	(Iceland) ISL	Toddi Örlygsson	24	0	19+3	0	0	0	2+0	0	0+0	0
	MF	(England) ENG	Paul Reid	47	2	40+0	1	4+0	0	2+0	1	1+0	0
	MF	(England) ENG	Paul Rickers	52	4	44+1	4	4+0	0	2+0	0	1+0	0
	FW	(England) ENG	Andy Ritchie	2	0	0+1	0	0+1	0	0+0	0	0+0	0
	MF	(England) ENG	Phil Salt	12	1	3+6	0	1+0	1	0+1	0	1+0	0
	MF	(Republic of Ireland) IRL	John Sheridan	34	2	30+0	2	4+0	0	0+0	0	0+0	0
	DF	(England) ENG	Lee Sinnott	21	0	14+4	0	1+0	0	2+0	0	0+0	0
	DF	(England) ENG	Nick Spooner	2	0	2+0	0	0+0	0	0+0	0	0+0	0
	FW	(England) ENG	Ryan Sugden	2	0	0+2	0	0+0	0	0+0	0	0+0	0
	DF	(Scotland) SCO	Iain Swan	2	0	1+0	0	0+1	0	0+0	0	0+0	0
	DF	(England) ENG	Stuart Thom	26	1	19+6	1	0+0	0	0+0	0	1+0	0
	FW	(Wales) WAL	Matthew Tipton	33	2	15+13	2	2+2	0	0+0	0	0+1	0
	MF	(England) ENG	Danny Walsh	1	0	0+1	0	0+0	0	0+0	0	0+0	0
	FW	(England) ENG	Steve Whitehall	43	4	28+8	4	4+0	0	1+1	0	1+0	0

== Final league table ==
Pos	Team	Pld	W	D	L	GF	GA	GD	Pts	Qualification or relegation
18	Colchester United	46	12	16	18	52	70	−18	52	
19	Wycombe Wanderers	46	13	12	21	52	58	−6	51	
20	Oldham Athletic	46	14	9	23	48	66	−18	51	
21	York City (R)	46	13	11	22	56	80	−24	50	Relegation to the Third Division
22	Northampton Town (R)	46	10	18	18	43	57	−14	48	Relegation to the Third Division

Rules for classification: 1) Points; 2) Goals scored; 3) Goal difference
(R) Relegated

== Competitions ==
=== Division 2 ===
8 August 1998 1	Oldham Athletic	1–3	Notts County	Oldham
	Holt 90'; Kelly (yellow card); Reid (yellow card)	Report	Richardson 8'; Farrell 21', 26'; Redmile (yellow card)	Stadium: Boundary Park; Attendance: 5709; Referee: D Pugh

15 August 1998 2	Blackpool	3–0	Oldham Athletic	Blackpool
	Bent 40'; Malkin 61'; Bushell 73'; Hills (yellow card)	Report		Stadium: Bloomfield Road; Attendance: 5258; Referee: G Laws

22 August 1998 3	Oldham Athletic	2–0	Chesterfield	Oldham
	Williams 1' (o.g.); Graham 82' (yellow card); Allott (yellow card)	Report	Howard (yellow card)	Stadium: Boundary Park; Attendance: 4548; Referee: Mike Dean

29 August 1998 4	Stoke City	2–0	Oldham Athletic	Stoke-on-Trent
	Keen 22'; Lightbourne 90'	Report		Stadium: Victoria Ground; Referee: G Cain

31 August 1998 5	Oldham Athletic	1–1	Fulham	Oldham
	Allott 61'	Report	Moody 50'	Stadium: Boundary Park; Attendance: 4744; Referee: S J Baines

5 September 1998 6	Lincoln City	1–3	Oldham Athletic	Lincoln
	Smith 69'; Austin (yellow card); Perry (yellow card); Finnigan (yellow card)	Report	Graham 28'; Littlejohn 34'; Allott 71'	Stadium: Sincil Bank; Attendance: 3224; Referee: R Pearson

8 September 1998 7	Oldham Athletic	1–2	Macclesfield Town	Oldham
	Littlejohn 11'; Örlygsson (red card) 64'; Garnett (yellow card); Rickers (yellow card); Reid (yellow card)	Report	Barclay 55'; Wood 66' (pen.); McDonald (yellow card)	Stadium: Boundary Park; Attendance: 5401; Referee: G B Frankland

12 September 1998 8	Northampton Town	1–1	Oldham Athletic	Northampton
	Freestone 56'	Report	Duxbury 45'; Holt (yellow card)	Stadium: Sixfields Stadium; Attendance: 5210; Referee: P Rejer

19 September 1998 9	Oldham Athletic	0–1	Preston North End	Oldham
		Report	Appleton 8' (yellow card); Macken (yellow card)	Stadium: Boundary Park; Attendance: 8205; Referee: D Laws

26 September 1998 10	Bournemouth	2–0	Oldham Athletic	Bournemouth
	Robinson 6'; Stein 49'; Hughes (yellow card)	Report	Duxbury (yellow card)	Stadium: Dean Court; Attendance: 5877; Referee: G Stretton

3 October 1998 11	Oldham Athletic	1–0	Colchester United	Oldham
	Rickers 20'; Sinnott (yellow card); Graham (yellow card); Duxbury (yellow card); Littlejohn (yellow card)	Report	Gregory (yellow card)	Stadium: Boundary Park; Attendance: 4231; Referee: B Coddington

9 October 1998 12	Oldham Athletic	2–3	Wigan Athletic	Oldham
	Graham 48'; Allott 90'; Holt (yellow card)	Report	Bradshaw 14'; Barlow 55'; Warne 73'	Stadium: Boundary Park; Attendance: 5499; Referee: P R Richards

17 October 1998 13	Luton Town	2–0	Oldham Athletic	Luton
	Gray 82'; Scarlett 90'; White (yellow card)	Report	McNiven (red card) 71'; Reid (yellow card); Littlejohn (yellow card)	Stadium: Kenilworth Road; Attendance: 5447; Referee: R Olivier

20 October 1998 14	Burnley	1–0	Oldham Athletic	Burnley
	Cooke 64'; Little (yellow card)	Report	Thom (yellow card); Örlygsson (yellow card); Littlejohn (yellow card)	Stadium: Turf Moor; Attendance: 9539; Referee: G B Frankland

24 October 1998 15	Oldham Athletic	0–0	Wycombe Wanderers	Oldham
		Report	Cousins (yellow card)	Stadium: Boundary Park; Attendance: 4337; Referee: M D Messias

31 October 1998 16	Millwall	1–1	Oldham Athletic	London
	Shaw 58'; Ryan (yellow card)	Report	McGinlay 13'; Garnett (yellow card); Spooner (yellow card) (yellow-red card) 49'	Stadium: The Den

7 November 1998 17	Oldham Athletic	0–3	Manchester City	Oldham
	Garnett (yellow card); Sheridan (yellow card)	Report	Horlock 17', 31' (yellow card); Morrison 69'; Edghill (yellow card)	Stadium: Boundary Park; Attendance: 12976; Referee: Scott Mathieson

10 November 1998 18	Gillingham	2–1	Oldham Athletic	Gillingham
	Asaba 76'; Patterson 77' (yellow card); Elliott (yellow card); Ashby (yellow card); Hessenthaler (yellow card)	Report	Whitehall 69'	Stadium: Priestfield Stadium; Attendance: 5188; Referee: D R Crick

21 November 1998 19	Oldham Athletic	3–2	Wrexham	Oldham
	Whitehall 26'; McNiven 81'; Tipton 88'; Holt (yellow card); Garnett (yellow card)	Report	Roberts 32'; Carey 71'	Stadium: Boundary Park; Attendance: 4446; Referee: Chris Foy

28 November 1998 20	Bristol Rovers	2–2	Oldham Athletic	Bristol
	Cureton 71'; Roberts 89'	Report	Rickers 6'; Sheridan 81'; Holt (yellow card)	Stadium: Eastville Stadium; Attendance: 5614; Referee: M J Brandwood

12 December 1998 21	Oldham Athletic	0–2	Walsall	Oldham
		Report	Otta 4'; Rammell 34'	Stadium: Boundary Park; Attendance: 4195; Referee: Phil Dowd

19 December 1998 22	Reading	1–1	Oldham Athletic	Reading
	McIntyre 29'; Kromheer (yellow card); Crawford (yellow card)	Report	Allott 56'; Thom (yellow card); Rickers (yellow card); Sheridan (yellow card); Reid (yellow card)	Stadium: Madejski Stadium; Attendance: 9390; Referee: Keith Hill

26 December 1998 23	Chesterfield	1–3	Oldham Athletic	Chesterfield
	Wilkinson 1'; Ebdon (yellow card)	Report	Allott 22', 65'; Holt 56'; Örlygsson (yellow card)	Stadium: Saltergate; Attendance: 5448; Referee: R D Furnandiz

28 December 1998 24	Oldham Athletic	0–2	York City	Oldham
		Report	Cresswell 34'; Jones 60'	Stadium: Boundary Park; Attendance: 5343; Referee: M Warren

9 January 1999 25	Notts County	0–1	Oldham Athletic	Nottingham
	Richardson (yellow card)	Report	Mardon 6' (yellow card); McNiven (yellow card); Reid (yellow card)	Stadium: Meadow Lane; Attendance: 4669; Referee: B Coddington

16 January 1999 26	Oldham Athletic	3–0	Blackpool	Oldham
	Holt 48'; Allott 55'; Duxbury 57'; Mardon (yellow card)	Report	Thompson (yellow card); Bryan (yellow card); Patterson (yellow card)	Stadium: Boundary Park; Attendance: 5353; Referee: J A Kirkby

26 January 1999 27	Fulham	1–0	Oldham Athletic	London
	Morgan 22'; Horsfield (yellow card)	Report	Whitehall (yellow card)	Stadium: Craven Cottage; Attendance: 8160; Referee: Andy D'Urso

30 January 1999 28	York City	0–1	Oldham Athletic	York
	Pouton (yellow card)	Report	Holt 38' (yellow card)	Stadium: Bootham Crescent; Attendance: 3760; Referee: E K Wolstenholme

6 February 1999 29	Oldham Athletic	2–0	Lincoln City	Oldham
	Thom 71'; Mardon 81'; Reid (yellow card)	Report	Barnett (yellow card); Holmes (yellow card); Gordon (yellow card)	Stadium: Boundary Park; Attendance: 5220; Referee: Anthony Bates

13 February 1999 30	Macclesfield Town	1–0	Oldham Athletic	Macclesfield
	Sodje 84' (yellow card); Sedgemore (yellow card)	Report		Stadium: Moss Rose; Attendance: 4038; Referee: S J Baines

20 February 1999 31	Oldham Athletic	0–1	Northampton Town	Oldham
	Allott (yellow card); Rickers (yellow card)	Report	Corazzin 10' (pen.); Peer (yellow card)	Stadium: Boundary Park; Attendance: 4752; Referee: G Laws

27 February 1999 32	Preston North End	2–1	Oldham Athletic	Preston
	Nogan 24'; Jackson 65'	Report	Mardon 45'; Garnett (yellow card); Sheridan (yellow card)	Stadium: Deepdale; Attendance: 12965; Referee: W C Burns

6 March 1999 33	Oldham Athletic	2–3	Bournemouth	Oldham
	Whitehall 47'; Duxbury 75' (yellow card)	Report	Cox 2'; Stein 44'; Warren 63'; Howe (yellow card)	Stadium: Boundary Park; Attendance: 4453; Referee: MIke Pike

9 March 1999 34	Colchester United	2–2	Oldham Athletic	Colchester
	Allen 40'; D. Gregory 67' (pen.); Dunne (yellow card); Buckle (yellow card); Dozzell (yellow card); N. Gregory (yellow card)	Report	Whitehall 56'; Duxbury 75'; Holt (yellow card) (yellow-red card) 81'; Örlygsson (yellow card); Thom (yellow card)	Stadium: Layer Road; Attendance: 3616; Referee: Keith Hill

13 March 1999 35	Manchester City	1–2	Oldham Athletic	Manchester
	Taylor 79'; Edghill (yellow card)	Report	Reid 27' (pen.) (yellow card); Duxbury 56'; Rickers (yellow card)	Stadium: Maine Road; Attendance: 30321; Referee: M J Brandwood

20 March 1999 36	Oldham Athletic	0–1	Millwall	Oldham
	Duxbury (yellow card)	Report	Cahill 25'; Stuart (yellow card)	Stadium: Boundary Park; Attendance: 4565; Referee: Mike Jones

27 March 1999 37	Wycombe Wanderers	3–0	Oldham Athletic	Wycombe
	Carroll 16', 34'; McCarthy 42'	Report	Sheridan (yellow card); Swan (yellow card); Duxbury (yellow card)	Stadium: Adams Park; Attendance: 4083; Referee: D R Crick

2 April 1999 38	Oldham Athletic	1–1	Luton Town	Oldham
	Garnett 62' (yellow card); Mardon (yellow card); Allott (yellow card)	Report	Gray 5'; McGowan (yellow card) (yellow-red card) 89'; Spring (yellow card); Thorpe (yellow card)	Stadium: Boundary Park; Attendance: 4948; Referee: P S Danson

5 April 1999 39	Wigan Athletic	2–0	Oldham Athletic	Wigan
	Haworth 27'; Bradshaw 90' (pen.); Porter (yellow card); O'Neill (yellow card)	Report	Mardon (red card) 85'; Allott (yellow card)	Stadium: Springfield Park; Attendance: 4754; Referee: A N Butler

10 April 1999 40	Oldham Athletic	1–1	Burnley	Oldham
	Tipton 37'; Duxbury (yellow card)	Report	Payton 52'	Stadium: Boundary Park; Attendance: 8542; Referee: R Pearson

13 April 1999 41	Oldham Athletic	2–1	Bristol Rovers	Oldham
	Sheridan 58'; Rickers 65'; Reid (yellow card)	Report	Roberts 23'; Pritchard (yellow card); Foster (yellow card); Penrice (yellow card)	Stadium: Boundary Park; Attendance: 8542; Referee: K M Lynch

17 April 1999 42	Wrexham	1–2	Oldham Athletic	Wrexham
	Spink 35'; Ridler (yellow card)	Report	Garnett 40'; Holt 84'; Rickers (yellow card)	Stadium: Racecourse Ground; Attendance: 3267; Referee: A R Hall

24 April 1999 43	Oldham Athletic	1–4	Gillingham	Oldham
	Beavers 33'; Garnett (yellow card); Whitehall (yellow card)	Report	Asaba 4' (yellow card); Smith 10'; Galloway 27'; Taylor 78'	Stadium: Boundary Park; Attendance: 5331; Referee: M D Messias

1 May 1999 44	Walsall	3–1	Oldham Athletic	Walsall
	Wrack 22'; Marsh 34'; Eyjólfsson 76'; Henry (yellow card)	Report	Duxbury 56'; Garnett (yellow card); Rickers (yellow card); Reid (yellow card); Tipton (yellow card)	Stadium: Bescot Stadium; Attendance: 9184; Referee: R Styles

4 May 1999 45	Oldham Athletic	1–0	Stoke City	Oldham
	Thom (red card) 21'; Beavers 50' (yellow card)	Report	Collins (yellow card); O'Connor (yellow card)	Stadium: Boundary Park; Attendance: 5015; Referee: Paul Robinson

8 May 1999 46	Oldham Athletic	2–0	Reading	Oldham
	Innes 5' (yellow card); Rickers 27'	Report		Stadium: Boundary Park; Attendance: 7724; Referee: R D Furnandiz

=== F.A. Cup ===
14 November 1998 1	Oldham Athletic	2–0	Gillingham	Oldham
	Salt 33'; McNiven 37'	Report	Carr (yellow card)	Stadium: Boundary Park; Attendance: 3173; Referee: A G Wiley

5 December 1998 2	Oldham Athletic	1–1	Brentford	Oldham
	McGinlay 74' (pen.); Garnett (yellow card)	Report	Freeman 35' (pen.) (yellow card)	Stadium: Boundary Park; Attendance: 4217; Referee: A B Wilkie

15 December 1998 2r	Brentford	2–2 (a.e.t.) (2–4 p)	Oldham Athletic	Brentford
	Owusu 10'; Bates (red card) 47'; Freeman 67' (yellow card)	Report	McGinlay 20' (yellow card); Duxbury 72'; McNiven (yellow card); Garnett (yellow card); Sheridan (yellow card)	Stadium: Griffin Park; Attendance: 4375; Referee: A B Wilkie

2 January 1999 3	Oldham Athletic	0–2	Chelsea	Oldham
	McNiven (yellow card); Garnett (yellow card); Reid (yellow card)	Report	Vialli 68', 75'; Babayaro (yellow card); Duberry (yellow card)	Stadium: Boundary Park; Attendance: 12770; Referee: P A Durkin

=== Football League Cup ===
11 August 1998 1	Oldham Athletic	3–2	Crewe Alexandra	Oldham
	Littlejohn 20' (yellow card); Reid 23' (pen.); Allott 31'	Report	Little 40', 78'	Stadium: Boundary Park; Attendance: 3766

18 August 1998 1	Crewe Alexandra	2–0	Oldham Athletic	Crewe
	Jack 31', 76'; Johnson (yellow card)	Report	Allott (yellow card)	Stadium: Gresty Road; Attendance: 3428; Referee: MIke Pike

=== Football League Trophy (Auto Windscreens Shield) ===
8 December 1998 1	Oldham Athletic	0–1	Darlington	Oldham
	Reid (yellow card)	Report	Gabbiadini 95'	Stadium: Boundary Park; Attendance: 2133; Referee: Mike Jones
