= 2001–02 Oldham Athletic A.F.C. season =

Oldham Athletic
2001–02 season
- Chairman: David Brierley
- Manager: Andy Ritchie; John Sheridan (C); Billy Urmson (C); Mick Wadsworth
- Stadium: Boundary Park
- Second Division: 9th
- FA Cup: Third round
- League Cup: Second round
- Auto Windscreens Shield: Semi-final
- Top goalscorer: David Eyres (14)
Home colours	Away colours

During the 2001–02 English football season, Oldham Athletic A.F.C. competed in the Football League Second Division.

== Statistics ==
=== Appearances and goals ===
No.	Pos	Nat	Player	Total		Division 2		F.A. Cup		League Cup		League Trophy	
No.	Pos	Nat	Player	Apps	Goals	Apps	Goals	Apps	Goals	Apps	Goals	Apps	Goals
1	GK	(Republic of Ireland) IRL	Gary Kelly	31	0	22+1	0	4+0	0	2+0	0	2+0	0
2	DF	(Scotland) SCO	Scott McNiven	43	0	32+3	0	3+0	0	2+0	0	1+2	0
3	MF	(England) ENG	Darren Sheridan	37	2	25+3	2	4+0	0	2+0	0	3+0	0
4	DF	(England) ENG	Shaun Garnett	9	0	4+4	0	0+0	0	1+0	0	0+0	0
5	DF	(Scotland) SCO	Stuart Balmer	44	6	35+1	6	4+0	0	2+0	0	2+0	0
6	MF	(England) ENG	Lee Duxbury	48	7	34+6	4	4+0	2	2+0	0	2+0	1
7	MF	(England) ENG	Paul Rickers	30	2	13+11	2	1+1	0	2+0	0	1+1	0
8	MF	(Republic of Ireland) IRL	John Sheridan	31	3	24+3	2	4+0	1	0+0	0	0+0	0
9	FW	(Nigeria) NGR	Dele Adebola	5	0	5+0	0	0+0	0	0+0	0	0+0	0
9	FW	(Wales) WAL	Matthew Tipton	30	5	11+11	5	2+2	0	1+1	0	2+0	0
10	FW	(England) ENG	John Eyre	28	6	11+9	5	2+1	0	2+0	0	2+1	1
11	MF	(England) ENG	Matty Appleby	17	2	16+1	2	0+0	0	0+0	0	0+0	0
11	DF	(Scotland) SCO	Mark Innes	10	0	0+5	0	0+2	0	0+1	0	2+0	0
12	MF	(England) ENG	Mark Allott	20	4	9+6	4	1+1	0	1+0	0	0+2	0
13	GK	(Northern Ireland) NIR	David Miskelly	4	0	4+0	0	0+0	0	0+0	0	0+0	0
14	DF	(England) ENG	Michael Clegg	6	0	5+1	0	0+0	0	0+0	0	0+0	0
15	MF	(England) ENG	Lee Hardy	1	1	0+1	1	0+0	0	0+0	0	0+0	0
16	GK	(Scotland) SCO	Andy Goram	4	0	4+0	0	0+0	0	0+0	0	0+0	0
17	FW	(England) ENG	Craig Dudley	14	1	6+3	1	0+2	0	0+1	0	0+2	0
18	MF	(England) ENG	Danny Boshell	4	0	2+2	0	0+0	0	0+0	0	0+0	0
19	FW	(Canada) CAN	Carlo Corazzin	37	9	24+9	9	2+0	0	0+1	0	1+0	0
20	MF	(Argentina) ARG	Cristian Colusso	13	2	6+7	2	0+0	0	0+0	0	0+0	0
20	DF	(England) ENG	Mark Hotte	2	0	0+0	0	0+0	0	0+2	0	0+0	0
21	DF	(England) ENG	Fitz Hall	4	1	4+0	1	0+0	0	0+0	0	0+0	0
21	DF	(Republic of Ireland) IRL	Barry Prenderville	14	0	10+2	0	0+0	0	2+0	0	0+0	0
23	DF	(Scotland) SCO	Will Haining	4	0	1+3	0	0+0	0	0+0	0	0+0	0
24	DF	(England) ENG	Dean Holden	27	2	20+3	2	1+0	0	0+0	0	3+0	0
25	MF	(England) ENG	Wayne Gill	3	0	3+0	0	0+0	0	0+0	0	0+0	0
26	DF	(England) ENG	Adam Griffin	1	0	0+1	0	0+0	0	0+0	0	0+0	0
26	FW	(England) ENG	Marc Richards	6	1	3+2	0	0+0	0	0+0	0	1+0	1
28	MF	(England) ENG	David Eyres	52	13	40+5	9	4+0	3	2+0	0	1+0	1
30	MF	(England) ENG	Paul Murray	26	5	23+1	5	1+0	0	0+0	0	1+0	0
31	MF	(England) ENG	Tony Carss	15	1	7+7	1	0+0	0	1+0	0	0+0	0
32	DF	(England) ENG	David Beharall	22	1	18+0	1	2+0	0	0+0	0	2+0	0
33	DF	(England) ENG	Chris Armstrong	35	0	31+1	0	0+0	0	0+0	0	3+0	0
34	DF	(France) FRA	Julien Baudet	24	1	13+7	1	1+2	0	0+0	0	1+0	0
35	FW	(Scotland) SCO	Allan Smart	24	7	14+7	6	1+0	0	0+0	0	2+0	1
37	GK	(England) ENG	Paul Rachubka	17	0	16+0	0	0+0	0	0+0	0	1+0	0
38	FW	(England) ENG	Dave Reeves	13	3	11+2	3	0+0	0	0+0	0	0+0	0

== Final league table ==
Pos	Team	Pld	W	D	L	GF	GA	GD	Pts
7	Bristol City	46	21	10	15	68	53	+15	73
8	Queens Park Rangers	46	19	14	13	60	49	+11	71
9	Oldham Athletic	46	18	16	12	77	65	+12	70
10	Wigan Athletic	46	16	16	14	66	51	+15	64
11	Wycombe Wanderers	46	17	13	16	58	64	−6	64

Rules for classification: In the Football League goals scored (GF) takes precedence over goal difference (GD).

== Competitions ==
=== League Division 2 ===
11 August 2001 1	Wrexham	3–3	Oldham Athletic	Wrexham
	Lawrence 51'; Edwards 59'; Faulconbridge 63'	Report	Allott 38'; Eyres 73'; Garnett (yellow card) 78'; Sheridan (yellow card) 86'; Corazzin 90'; Tipton (yellow card) 90'	Stadium: Racecourse Ground; Attendance: 4,881; Referee: Brian Curson

18 August 2001 2	Oldham Athletic	1–1	Chesterfield	Oldham
	Allott 33'	Report	Willis 70'	Stadium: Boundary Park; Attendance: 5,534; Referee: Howard Webb

25 August 2001 3	Swindon Town	0–2	Oldham Athletic	Swindon
	Davis (yellow card) 65'; Gurney (yellow card) 79'	Report	Balmer (yellow card) 1' (goal) 39'; Sheridan 17'; McNiven (yellow card) 58'	Stadium: County Ground; Attendance: 5,219; Referee: Paul Armstrong

28 August 2001 4	Oldham Athletic	4–2	Northampton Town	Oldham
	Balmer 6'; Rickers 35'; Duxbury 63'; Tipton 78'	Report	Hope 53', 90'	Stadium: Boundary Park; Attendance: 4,941; Referee: Frazer Stretton

1 September 2001 5	Tranmere Rovers	2–2	Oldham Athletic	Birkenhead
	Barlow 36'; Challinor (yellow card) 38'; Mellon (yellow card) 38' (goal) 88'; Hazell (yellow card) 66'; Yates (yellow card) 74'; Thornton (yellow card) 81'	Report	Sheridan 12' (yellow card) 22'; Eyre 33'; Rickers (yellow card) 34'; Duxbury (yellow card) 45'; Prenderville (yellow card) 49'; Balmer (yellow card) 52'; McNiven (yellow card) 79'	Stadium: Prenton Park; Attendance: 8,716; Referee: Mick Fletcher

8 September 2001 6	Oldham Athletic	2–1	Blackpool	Oldham
	Allott (yellow card) 4'; Sheridan 30' (yellow card) 41'; Duxbury (yellow card) 36'; McNiven (yellow card) 67'; Eyre (yellow card) 77'; Duxbury 88'	Report	O'Kane (yellow card) 27' (yellow-red card) 60'; Wellens (yellow card) 58'; Ormerod 78'; Hughes (yellow card) 88'	Stadium: Boundary Park; Attendance: 6,650; Referee: Mike Ryan

15 September 2001 7	Oldham Athletic	2–0	Peterborough United	Oldham
	Corazzin 85'; Tipton 90' (pen.)	Report	Edwards (yellow card) 44'	Stadium: Boundary Park; Attendance: 4,855; Referee: Tony Leake

18 September 2001 8	Colchester United	2–1	Oldham Athletic	Colchester
	Izzet 10'; McGleish 27'	Report	D. Sheridan (yellow card) 18'; J. Sheridan (red card) 71'; Eyres 81'	Stadium: Layer Road; Attendance: 2,991; Referee: Paul Alcock

22 September 2001 9	Brentford	2–2	Oldham Athletic	Brentford
	Owusu (yellow card) 45' (goal) 47'; Evans 50' (pen.); Rowlands (red card) 77'	Report	Prenderville (yellow card) 26'; Rickers 36'; Kelly (yellow card) 53'; McNiven (yellow card) 62'; Corazzin 74'	Stadium: Griffin Park; Attendance: 5,525; Referee: Richard Beeby

25 September 2001 10	Oldham Athletic	4–0	Bury	Oldham
	Duxbury 8'; Rickers (yellow card) 26'; Tipton 45'; Corazzin 63'; Allott 90'	Report	Unsworth (yellow card) 20'; Seddon (red card) 72'; Billy (yellow card) 76'	Stadium: Boundary Park; Attendance: 5,605; Referee: Mike Pike

29 September 2001 11	Oldham Athletic	4–1	Notts County	Oldham
	Fenton 20' (o.g.); Dudley 22'; Tipton (yellow card) 32'; McNiven (yellow card) 51'; Eyre 84'; Corazzin 90' (pen.)	Report	Richardson (yellow card) 16'; Baraclough (yellow card) 48'; Stallard 62'	Stadium: Boundary Park; Attendance: 6,864; Referee: Graham Laws

5 October 2001 12	Bournemouth	3–2	Oldham Athletic	Dorchester
	Tindall (yellow card) 44' (yellow-red card) 70'; Hayter 57'; Holmes 60'; Elliott 65'; Howe (yellow card) 89'	Report	Tipton 1'; Boshell (yellow card) 53'; Eyres (yellow card) 63'; Tindall 66' (o.g.); Eyre (yellow card) 83'	Stadium: The Avenue Stadium; Attendance: 3,312; Referee: Andy Hall

13 October 2001 13	Oldham Athletic	0–1	Bristol City	Oldham
	Holden (yellow card) 41'; Richards (yellow card) 68'	Report	Murray 39'; Jones (yellow card) 78'; Thorpe (yellow card) 90'	Stadium: Boundary Park; Attendance: 6,565; Referee: Phil Joslin

20 October 2001 14	Brighton & Hove Albion	3–0	Oldham Athletic	Brighton and Hove
	Rogers 7'; Steele 14', 28'	Report	Balmer (yellow card) 43'; Tipton (yellow card) 48'	Stadium: Withdean Stadium; Attendance: 6,793; Referee: Lee Cable

23 October 2001 15	Oldham Athletic	0–1	Reading	Oldham
	McNiven (yellow card) 50'; Sheridan (yellow card) 80'	Report	Cureton 19'; Butler (yellow card) 77'	Stadium: Boundary Park; Attendance: 4,901; Referee: Roger Furnandiz

27 October 2001 16	Queens Park Rangers	1–1	Oldham Athletic	London
	Doudou 26'; De Ornelas (yellow card) 83'	Report	Balmer 65'	Stadium: Loftus Road; Attendance: 10,556; Referee: Grant Hegley

3 November 2001 17	Oldham Athletic	1–1	Huddersfield Town	Oldham
	Holden (yellow card) 58'; Balmer 76'	Report	Schofield 23'	Stadium: Boundary Park; Attendance: 8,859; Referee: Mike Dean

10 November 2001 18	Cambridge United	1–1	Oldham Athletic	Cambridge
	Ashbee (yellow card) 27'; Pérez (yellow card) 39'; Kitson 58'; Alcide (yellow card) 58'; Tudor (yellow card) 60'	Report	Allott 18'; Armstrong (yellow card) 47'	Stadium: Abbey Stadium; Attendance: 3,378; Referee: Paul Taylor

21 November 2001 19	Stoke City	0–0	Oldham Athletic	Stoke-on-Trent
	Thomas (yellow card) 50'; Smart (red card) 84'	Report		Stadium: Britannia Stadium; Attendance: 11,031; Referee: Graham Frankland

24 November 2001 20	Oldham Athletic	2–0	Wycombe Wanderers	Oldham
	Holden (yellow card) 21'; Tipton 31'; Rammell 39' (o.g.)	Report	Simpson (yellow card) 35'; Rammell (red card) 70'; Walker (yellow card) 72'	Stadium: Boundary Park; Attendance: 4,731; Referee: Alan Kaye

1 December 2001 21	Cardiff City	3–1	Oldham Athletic	Cardiff
	Earnshaw 37'; Kavanagh 74', 90'	Report	Smart (yellow card) 3'; Holden (yellow card) 10'; Balmer (yellow card) 53'; Eyre 75' (yellow card) 90'; Sheridan (yellow card) 90'	Stadium: Ninian Park; Attendance: 10,004; Referee: Ray Olivier

15 December 2001 22	Oldham Athletic	1–1	Wigan Athletic	Oldham
	Armstrong (yellow card) 56'; Beharall 89'	Report	Liddell 62'	Stadium: Boundary Park; Attendance: 6,407; Referee: Uriah Rennie

21 December 2001 23	Oldham Athletic	2–0	Port Vale	Oldham
	Holden (yellow card) 19'; Armstrong (yellow card) 21'; Eyres 30'; Reeves 57'	Report	Rowland (yellow card) 32'	Stadium: Boundary Park; Attendance: 4,317; Referee: Graham Salisbury

26 December 2001 24	Blackpool	0–2	Oldham Athletic	Blackpool
	Barnes (yellow card) 55'; Collins (yellow card) 64'	Report	Reeves 56' (pen.), 66'	Stadium: Bloomfield Road; Attendance: 5,772; Referee: George Cain

29 December 2001 25	Northampton Town	0–1	Oldham Athletic	Northampton
	Sampson (yellow card) 37'; Welch (red card) 45'	Report	Murray (yellow card) 55'; Eyres 80'	Stadium: Sixfields Stadium; Attendance: 4,760; Referee: Joe Ross

12 January 2002 26	Chesterfield	4–2	Oldham Athletic	Chesterfield
	Allott 53'; Hurst 54', 90'; Parrish (yellow card) 59'; Burt 66'; Williams (yellow card) 69'	Report	Murray 11'; Eyres (yellow card) 28' (goal) 47'; Baudet (yellow card) 70'; Smart (yellow card) 83'	Stadium: Saltergate; Attendance: 4,716; Referee: Bill Jordan

16 January 2002 27	Oldham Athletic	2–0	Swindon Town	Oldham
	Eyre 45', 81'	Report		Stadium: Boundary Park; Attendance: 3,970; Referee: Steve Baines

19 January 2002 28	Oldham Athletic	3–1	Wrexham	Oldham
	Murray 34'; Sheridan 56' (pen.); Corazzin 90'	Report	Morrell 11'; Carey (yellow card) 49' (red card) 55'; Roberts (yellow card) 90'	Stadium: Boundary Park; Attendance: 5,451; Referee: Mark Cowburn

22 January 2002 29	Port Vale	3–2	Oldham Athletic	Stoke-on-Trent
	McClare 22'; Cummins (yellow card) 32'; Brooker 45'; McPhee 80'	Report	Appleby 48'; Balmer (yellow card) 57'; Corazzin 70'	Stadium: Vale Park; Attendance: 4,408; Referee: Mark Clattenburg

26 January 2002 30	Oldham Athletic	3–3	Bournemouth	Oldham
	Balmer 18'; Murray (yellow card) 55'; Broadhurst 56' (o.g.); Eyres 63'	Report	Broadhurst (yellow card) 21'; Howe 53'; Feeney 56' (pen.); Hughes 66'; Hayter (yellow card) 73'; O'Connor (yellow card) 90'	Stadium: Boundary Park; Attendance: 4,853; Referee: Paul Danson

2 February 2002 31	Notts County	0–2	Oldham Athletic	Nottingham
	Caskey (yellow card) 78'	Report	Corazzin (yellow card) 5' (goal) 54'; Murray 49'	Stadium: Meadow Lane; Attendance: 4,555; Referee: Trevor Parkes

9 February 2002 32	Oldham Athletic	2–0	Brighton & Hove Albion	Oldham
	Appleby 30'; Duxbury (yellow card) 49'; Eyres 81'	Report	Webb (yellow card) 29'; Zamora (red card) 84'	Stadium: Boundary Park; Attendance: 6,951; Referee: Chris Foy

16 February 2002 33	Bristol City	3–0	Oldham Athletic	Bristol
	Peacock 47'; Thorpe 70' (pen.); Lever 72'	Report	Murray (yellow card) 43'; Duxbury (yellow card) 45'; Holden (yellow card) 46'; Baudet (yellow card) 54' (yellow-red card) 68'; Appleby (yellow card) 90'; Colusso (yellow card) 90'	Stadium: Ashton Gate Stadium; Attendance: 10,849; Referee: Mark Cooper

19 February 2002 34	Oldham Athletic	1–1	Tranmere Rovers	Oldham
	Murray (yellow card) 58'; Colusso 60'; Appleby (yellow card) 67'	Report	Rideout 12'	Stadium: Boundary Park; Attendance: 5,998; Referee: Neale Barry

23 February 2002 35	Peterborough United	2–2	Oldham Athletic	Peterborough
	Forinton 9'; Gill (yellow card) 18'; Bullard (yellow card) 53'; Fenn 65'	Report	Murray (yellow card) 8' (goal) 11'; Smart 15'; Appleby (yellow card) 90'	Stadium: London Road Stadium; Attendance: 4,308; Referee: Mark Warren

26 February 2002 36	Oldham Athletic	3–2	Brentford	Oldham
	Eyres 45' (pen.) (yellow card) 58'; Smart 62', 69'; Murray (yellow card) 79'	Report	Hunt (yellow card) 18'; Burgess 30', 87'	Stadium: Boundary Park; Attendance: 4,935; Referee: Paul Rejer

2 March 2002 37	Oldham Athletic	4–1	Colchester United	Oldham
	Smart 24'; Murray 44'; Eyres 77'; Corazzin 90'	Report	Izzet 12'; White (yellow card) 59'	Stadium: Boundary Park; Attendance: 5,457; Referee: Howard Webb

5 March 2002 38	Bury	1–1	Oldham Athletic	Bury
	Forrest 14'	Report	Armstrong (yellow card) 20'; Colusso 90'	Stadium: Gigg Lane; Attendance: Gigg Lane; Referee: Tony Bates

9 March 2002 39	Wigan Athletic	1–0	Oldham Athletic	Wigan
	Mitchell (yellow card) 34'; Liddell 61'	Report	Smart (yellow card) 30'; Appleby (yellow card) 34'; Balmer (yellow card) 85'	Stadium: JJB Stadium; Attendance: 7,389; Referee: Mike Jones

16 March 2002 40	Oldham Athletic	1–7	Cardiff City	Oldham
	Appleby (yellow card) 18' (yellow-red card) 32'; Armstrong (yellow card) 47'; Balmer 74'	Report	Young 6'; Fortune-West 22'; Thorne 23'; Campbell 30', 64', 73' (yellow card) 31'; Fortune-West 45'; Legg (yellow card) 60'	Stadium: Boundary Park; Attendance: 6,786; Referee: Colin Webster

23 March 2002 41	Reading	2–2	Oldham Athletic	Reading
	Mackie 8'; Parkinson 45'	Report	Eyres (yellow card) 25'; Duxbury 31'; Baudet (yellow card) 54'; Smart (yellow card) 70' (goal) 75'	Stadium: Madejski Stadium; Attendance: 15,191; Referee: Clive Penton

30 March 2002 42	Oldham Athletic	2–2	Cambridge United	Oldham
	Armstrong (yellow card) 4'; Sheridan (red card) 26'; Duxbury (yellow card) 38'; Holden 45', 90' (yellow card) 62'; Eyres (yellow card) 65'	Report	Ashbee 37'; Guttridge 57' (pen.) (yellow card) 79'	Stadium: Boundary Park; Attendance: 4,957; Referee: Mike Ryan

1 April 2002 43	Huddersfield Town	0–0	Oldham Athletic	Huddersfield
	Knight (red card) 4'; Gray (yellow card) 13'	Report	McNiven (yellow card) 11'	Stadium: Kirklees Stadium; Attendance: 14,343; Referee: Matt Messias

6 April 2002 44	Oldham Athletic	2–1	Stoke City	Oldham
	Carss 25'; Hall 88'	Report	Thomas (yellow card) 44' (yellow-red card) 48'; Holden 63' (o.g.); Gudjónsson (yellow card) 65'; Thórdarson (yellow card) 87'	Stadium: Boundary Park; Attendance: 6,548; Referee: Dermot Gallagher

13 April 2002 45	Wycombe Wanderers	2–1	Oldham Athletic	Wycombe
	Devine 3'; Brown 15' (pen.); McCarthy (yellow card) 60'	Report	Smart 82' (pen.)	Stadium: Adams Park; Attendance: 6,728; Referee: Phil Joslin

20 April 2002 46	Oldham Athletic	1–0	Queens Park Rangers	Oldham
	Baudet 10'; Smart (yellow card) 45'; Colusso (yellow card) 53'	Report	Langley (yellow card) 47'; Palmer (yellow card) 59'	Stadium: Boundary Park; Attendance: 7,262; Referee: Graham Laws

=== F.A. Cup ===
17 November 2001 1	Oldham Athletic	1–1	Barrow	Oldham
	Duxbury 33'	Report	Housham 3'	Stadium: Boundary Park; Attendance: 5,795; Referee: George Cain

27 November 2001 1	Barrow	0–1	Oldham Athletic	Barrow-in-Furness
	Shaw (yellow card) 18'; Anthony (yellow card) 38'	Report	Eyres 5'	Stadium: Holker Street; Attendance: 4,368; Referee: George Cain

8 December 2001 2	Hull City	2–3	Oldham Athletic	Hull
	Dudfield 15'; Whittle (yellow card) 31'; Alexander 64' (yellow card) 65'; Johnsson (yellow card) 83'	Report	Sheridan 32'; Tipton (yellow card) 47'; Eyres 48'; Duxbury 50'; Balmer (yellow card) 56'	Stadium: Boothferry Park; Attendance: 9,422; Referee: Mark Clattenburg

6 January 2002 3	Cheltenham Town	2–1	Oldham Athletic	Cheltenham
	Naylor 25', 60'	Report	Eyres 43'; Sheridan (yellow card) 73' (yellow-red card) 81'	Stadium: Whaddon Road; Attendance: 5,801; Referee: John Brandwood

=== Football League Cup ===
22 August 2001 1	Stoke City	0–0 (a.e.t.) (5–6 p)	Oldham Athletic	Stoke-on-Trent
	Rowson (yellow card) 45'; Thórdarson (yellow card) 80'; Handyside (red card) 102'	Report	Tipton (yellow card) 2'	Stadium: Britannia Stadium; Attendance: 5,636; Referee: Alan Kaye
	Penalties
	Shtanyuk (penalty missed); Guðjónsson (penalty scored); Clarke (penalty scored); Vandeurzen (penalty scored); Thomas (penalty missed); Iwelumo (penalty scored); Cooke (penalty missed); Hoekstra (penalty scored); Henry (penalty missed)		Tipton (penalty scored); Duxbury (penalty scored); Sheridan (penalty missed); Balmer (penalty scored); Carss (penalty missed); McNiven (penalty scored); Innes (penalty missed); Dudley (penalty scored); Kelly (penalty scored)

12 September 2001 2	Blackburn Rovers	2–0	Oldham Athletic	Blackburn
	Jansen 14'; Dunning 77'	Report	Sheridan (yellow card) 51' (red card) 84'; Eyres (yellow card) 88'	Stadium: Ewood Park; Attendance: 9,559; Referee: Tony Bates

=== Football League Trophy (LDV Vans Trophy) ===
30 October 2001 2	Oldham Athletic	2–0	Tranmere Rovers	Oldham
	Eyre 18'; Innes (yellow card) 21'; Sheridan (yellow card) 58'; Richards 90'	Report	Mellon (yellow card) 25'	Stadium: Boundary Park; Attendance: 2,940; Referee: Frazer Stretton

4 December 2001 QF	Notts County	0–1	Oldham Athletic	Nottingham
		Report	Smart 41'	Stadium: Meadow Lane; Attendance: 1,047; Referee: Tony Bates

9 January 2002 SF	Oldham Athletic	2–5	Blackpool	Oldham
	Duxbury 3'; Sheridan (red card) 26'; Eyres 46'; Smart (yellow card) 83'	Report	Walker 28', 36', 88'; Murphy 65'; Bullock (yellow card) 74' (goal) 80'	Stadium: Boundary Park; Attendance: 3,349; Referee: Richard Beeby
