= 1997–98 Oldham Athletic A.F.C. season =

Oldham Athletic
1997–98 season
- Chairman: Ian Stott
- Manager: Neil Warnock
- Stadium: Boundary Park
- Second Division: 13th
- FA Cup: Third round
- League Cup: First round
- Auto Windscreens Shield: First round
- Top goalscorer: League: Barlow (12); All: Barlow (13)
- Highest home attendance: 9,781 vs. Burnley
- Lowest home attendance: 4,244 vs. Plymouth Argyle
- Average home league attendance: 5,586
Home colours	Away colours

During the 1997–98 English football season, Oldham Athletic A.F.C. competed in the Football League Second Division.

== Season summary ==
In the 1997–98 season, Warnock was unable to achieve promotion with Oldham during the Division Two campaign and left after one disappointing year in charge, despite Oldham being in the play-off places until early March.

== Final league table ==
Pos	Team	Pld	W	D	L	GF	GA	GD	Pts
11	Wigan Athletic	46	17	11	18	64	66	−2	62
12	Blackpool	46	17	11	18	59	67	−8	62
13	Oldham Athletic	46	15	16	15	62	54	+8	61
14	Wycombe Wanderers	46	14	18	14	51	53	−2	60
15	Preston North End	46	15	14	17	56	56	0	59

Rules for classification: In the Football League goals scored (GF) takes precedence over goal difference (GD).

== Results ==
Oldham Athletic's score comes first

=== Legend ===
Win	Draw	Loss

=== Football League Second Division ===
Date	Opponent	Venue	Result	Attendance	Scorers
9 August 1997	York City	H	3–1	6,474	Garnett, Barlow, Reid
16 August 1997	Wrexham	A	1–3	4,429	McCarthy
23 August 1997	Bournemouth	H	2–1	4,986	McCarthy (2)
30 August 1997	Luton Town	A	1–1	5,404	Barlow
2 September 1997	Burnley	A	0–0	11,189	
9 September 1997	Preston North End	H	1–0	8,732	Wright
13 September 1997	Northampton Town	H	2–2	5,588	Graham, S McNiven
20 September 1997	Blackpool	A	2–2	7,174	Barlow (2)
27 September 1997	Bristol Rovers	H	4–4	5,990	Barlow (2), McCarthy, Garnett
4 October 1997	Fulham	A	1–3	8,805	Hodgson
11 October 1997	Millwall	A	1–2	7,906	Hodgson
18 October 1997	Chesterfield	H	2–0	5,777	Ritchie, Barlow
21 October 1997	Grimsby Town	H	2–0	4,520	Wright, Duxbury
25 October 1997	Southend United	A	1–1	3,595	Barlow
1 November 1997	Bristol City	A	0–1	10,221	
4 November 1997	Wigan Athletic	H	3–1	5,446	McCarthy (2), Graham
7 November 1997	Gillingham	H	3–1	5,338	Reid (2, 1 pen), Barlow
18 November 1997	Watford	A	1–2	8,397	Duxbury
22 November 1997	Brentford	H	1–1	5,012	McCarthy
29 November 1997	Plymouth Argyle	A	2–0	5,452	Mauge (own goal), Rickers
2 December 1997	Carlisle United	H	3–1	4,449	Rickers, Barlow, Duxbury
13 December 1997	Wycombe Wanderers	A	1–2	5,327	Barlow
19 December 1997	Walsall	H	0–0	4,677	
26 December 1997	Preston North End	A	1–1	13,441	Hodgson
10 January 1998	York City	A	0–0	4,454	
17 January 1998	Luton Town	H	2–1	6,057	Graham (2)
24 January 1998	Bournemouth	A	0–0	4,079	
27 January 1998	Wrexham	H	3–0	4,680	Rickers, Duxbury, Ritchie
31 January 1998	Northampton Town	A	0–0	6,559	
7 February 1998	Blackpool	H	0–1	6,576	
14 February 1998	Fulham	H	1–0	6,063	Duxbury
21 February 1998	Bristol Rovers	A	1–3	5,789	Starbuck (pen)
24 February 1998	Chesterfield	A	1–2	4,077	Garnett
28 February 1998	Millwall	H	1–1	4,805	Barlow
3 March 1998	Gillingham	A	1–2	5,254	Holt
14 March 1998	Wigan Athletic	A	0–1	4,277	
21 March 1998	Watford	H	2–2	5,744	Littlejohn, Allott
28 March 1998	Brentford	A	1–2	4,547	Reid (pen)
31 March 1998	Bristol City	H	1–2	4,543	Rush
4 April 1998	Plymouth Argyle	H	2–0	4,244	Littlejohn (2)
11 April 1998	Carlisle United	A	1–3	4,594	Hodgson
13 April 1998	Wycombe Wanderers	H	0–1	4,305	
18 April 1998	Walsall	A	0–0	3,562	
25 April 1998	Southend United	H	2–0	4,485	Jepson, D McNiven
28 April 1998	Burnley	H	3–3	9,781	Jepson, Rickers, Allott
2 May 1998	Grimsby Town	A	2–0	8,054	Jepson (2)

=== FA Cup ===
Round	Date	Opponent	Venue	Result	Attendance	Goalscorers
R1	15 November 1997	Mansfield Town	H	1–1	5,253	McCarthy
R1R	25 November 1997	Mansfield Town	A	1–0	4,097	Serrant
R2	6 December 1997	Blackpool	H	2–1	6,590	Graham, Barlow
R3	3 January 1998	Cardiff City	A	0–1	6,635	

=== League Cup ===
Round	Date	Opponent	Venue	Result	Attendance	Goalscorers
R1 1st Leg	12 August 1997	Grimsby Town	H	1–0	5,656	Ritchie
R1 2nd Leg	26 August 1997	Grimsby Town	A	0–5 (lost 1–5 on agg)	5,078	

=== Football League Trophy ===
Round	Date	Opponent	Venue	Result	Attendance	Goalscorers
NR1	9 December 1997	Carlisle United	A	0–1 (a.e.t.)	1,518	

== Players ==
=== First-team squad ===
Squad at end of season

Note: Flags indicate national team as defined under FIFA eligibility rules; some limited exceptions apply. Players may hold more than one non-FIFA nationality.

No.	Pos.	Nation	Player
—	GK	ENG	Mike Pollitt (on loan from Notts County)
—	GK	ENG	Ian Ironside
—	GK	NIR	David Miskelly
—	GK	IRL	Gary Kelly (Note: Kelly was born in Preston, England, but also qualified through his father, Alan Kelly Sr., to represent the Republic of Ireland internationally, and represented them at U-19, U-21, U-23, and B level.)
—	GK	ZIM	Bruce Grobbelaar (Note: Grobbelaar was born in Durban, South Africa, but was raised in Rhodesia (later named Zimbabwe) from the age of two months and made his international debut for Rhodesia in 1977 and for Zimbabwe in 1980.)
—	DF	ENG	Richard Graham
—	DF	ENG	Shaun Garnett
—	DF	ENG	Steve Redmond
—	DF	ENG	Phil Salt
—	DF	ENG	Carl Serrant
—	DF	ENG	Lee Sinnott
—	DF	ENG	Neil Thompson (on loan from Barnsley)
—	DF	ENG	Andy Holt
—	DF	SCO	Scott McNiven (Note: McNiven was born in Leeds, England, but also qualified through his father, David McNiven, to represent Scotland internationally, and represented them at U-21 level.)
—	DF	SCO	Mark Innes
—	DF	IRL	Danny Boxall (Note: Boxall was born in Croydon, England, but also qualified to represent the Republic of Ireland internationally and represented them at U-21 level.) (on loan from Crystal Palace)
—	DF	AUS	Doug Hodgson
—	MF	ENG	Paul Reid
—	MF	ENG	Lee Duxbury

No.	Pos.	Nation	Player
—	MF	ENG	Paul Rickers
—	MF	ENG	Mark Allott
—	MF	ENG	Andrew Hughes
—	MF	ENG	Mark Hotte
—	MF	ENG	Lee Richardson
—	MF	ISL	Þorvaldur Örlygsson
—	FW	ENG	Stuart Barlow
—	FW	ENG	Matthew Rush
—	FW	ENG	Andy Ritchie
—	FW	ENG	Ronnie Jepson
—	FW	ENG	Phil Starbuck
—	FW	ENG	Adrian Littlejohn
—	FW	ENG	David McNiven
—	FW	ENG	Lee Clitheroe
—	FW	ENG	Ian Ormondroyd
—	FW	WAL	Matthew Tipton
—	FW	WAL	Sean McCarthy
—	FW	SCO	Tommy Wright
—	FW	AUS	Alex Kyratzoglou

== Squad statistics ==
As of match played 2 May 1998

=== Appearances ===
Players with no appearances are not included on the list.

Pos.	Nat.	Player	Second Division			FA Cup			Coca Cola Cup			Auto Windscreens Shield			Total		
Pos.	Nat.	Player	Apps	Starts	Subs	Apps	Starts	Subs	Apps	Starts	Subs	Apps	Starts	Subs	Apps	Starts	Subs
MF	(England)	Paul Reid	44	44	0	4	4	0	2	2	0	0	0	0	50	50	0
MF	(England)	Paul Rickers	41	35	6	4	4	0	1	1	0	0	0	0	46	40	6
MF	(England)	Lee Duxbury	38	37	1	4	4	0	2	2	0	1	1	0	45	44	1
DF	(England)	Richard Graham	34	34	0	3	3	0	1	1	0	1	1	0	39	39	0
DF	(England)	Shaun Garnett	34	32	2	2	2	0	2	2	0	1	1	0	39	37	2
DF	(England)	Steve Redmond	34	32	2	3	3	0	2	2	0	0	0	0	39	37	2
DF	(Scotland)	Scott McNiven	32	25	7	4	3	1	2	1	1	1	1	0	39	30	9
FW	(England)	Stuart Barlow	32	31	1	4	3	1	2	2	0	0	0	0	38	36	2
DF	(England)	Carl Serrant	30	30	0	3	3	0	2	2	0	0	0	0	35	35	0
GK	(Republic of Ireland)	Gary Kelly	26	26	0	4	4	0	1	1	0	1	1	0	32	32	0
DF	(Australia)	Doug Hodgson	27	22	5	3	3	0	2	0	2	0	0	0	32	25	7
FW	(Wales)	Sean McCarthy	25	16	9	3	3	0	1	1	0	1	1	0	30	21	9
FW	(England)	Mark Allott	22	10	12	4	2	2	1	0	1	1	1	0	28	13	15
FW	(England)	Matthew Rush	16	11	5	3	0	3	0	0	0	1	0	1	20	11	9
DF	(Republic of Ireland)	Danny Boxall	18	18	0	0	0	0	0	0	0	1	1	0	19	19	0
FW	(England)	Andy Ritchie	15	10	5	2	1	1	1	1	0	0	0	0	18	12	6
GK	(England)	Mike Pollitt	16	16	0	0	0	0	0	0	0	0	0	0	16	16	0
DF	(England)	Andy Holt	14	7	7	1	1	0	0	0	0	0	0	0	15	8	7
DF	(England)	Lee Sinnott	13	11	2	0	0	0	1	1	0	0	0	0	14	12	2
FW	(Scotland)	Tommy Wright	12	10	2	1	1	0	0	0	0	0	0	0	13	11	2
MF	(England)	Andrew Hughes	10	1	9	1	0	1	1	1	0	1	1	0	13	3	10
MF	(Iceland)	Toddy Örlygsson	11	8	3	0	0	0	1	1	0	0	0	0	12	9	3
FW	(England)	Ronnie Jepson	9	9	0	0	0	0	0	0	0	0	0	0	9	9	0
FW	(England)	Phil Starbuck	9	7	2	0	0	0	0	0	0	0	0	0	9	7	2
DF	(England)	Neil Thompson	8	8	0	0	0	0	0	0	0	0	0	0	8	8	0
FW	(Scotland)	David McNiven	8	2	6	0	0	0	0	0	0	0	0	0	8	2	6
FW	(England)	Adrian Littlejohn	5	5	0	0	0	0	0	0	0	0	0	0	5	5	0
DF	(Scotland)	Mark Innes	4	2	2	0	0	0	0	0	0	1	1	0	5	3	2
GK	(Zimbabwe)	Bruce Grobbelaar	4	4	0	0	0	0	0	0	0	0	0	0	4	4	0
FW	(England)	Matthew Tipton	3	1	2	0	0	0	0	0	0	1	0	1	4	1	3
FW	(England)	Lee Clitheroe	3	1	2	0	0	0	0	0	0	0	0	0	3	1	2
MF	(England)	Phil Salt	1	1	0	0	0	0	0	0	0	1	1	0	2	2	0
DF	(England)	Mark Hotte	1	0	1	0	0	0	0	0	0	0	0	0	1	0	1
FW	(England)	Ian Ormondroyd	1	0	1	0	0	0	0	0	0	0	0	0	1	0	1
Total			46			4			2			1			53		

=== Goals ===
Pos.	Nat.	Player	League	FA Cup	Lge Cup	EFL Trophy	Total
FW	(England)	Stuart Barlow	12	1	0	0	13
FW	(Wales)	Sean McCarthy	7	1	0	0	8
MF	(England)	Lee Duxbury	5	0	0	0	5
DF	(England)	Richard Graham	4	1	0	0	5
DF	(Australia)	Doug Hodgson	4	0	0	0	4
FW	(England)	Ronnie Jepson	4	0	0	0	4
MF	(England)	Paul Reid	4	0	0	0	4
MF	(England)	Paul Rickers	4	0	0	0	4
DF	(England)	Shaun Garnett	3	0	0	0	3
FW	(England)	Adrian Littlejohn	3	0	0	0	3
FW	(England)	Andy Ritchie	2	0	1	0	3
FW	(England)	Mark Allott	2	0	0	0	2
FW	(Scotland)	Tommy Wright	2	0	0	0	2
DF	(England)	Andy Holt	1	0	0	0	1
FW	(Scotland)	David McNiven	1	0	0	0	1
DF	(Scotland)	Scott McNiven	1	0	0	0	1
FW	(England)	Matthew Rush	1	0	0	0	1
FW	(England)	Phil Starbuck	1	0	0	0	1
DF	(England)	Carl Serrant	0	1	0	0	1
Total			61	4	1	0	66

== Transfers ==
=== In ===
Date	Pos.	Name	From	Fee
1 August 1997	DF	(England) Lee Sinnott	(England) Huddersfield Town	£50,000
11 November 1997	GK	(England) Jonathan Scargill	(England) Hyde United	Non-contract
15 January 1998	FW	(England) Ronnie Jepson	(England) Bury	£400,000
20 March 1998	FW	(England) Adrian Littlejohn	(England) Plymouth Argyle	Signed

=== Out ===
Date	Pos.	Name	To	Fee
15 July 1997	GK	(England) Jon Hallworth	(Wales) Cardiff City	Free transfer
1 August 1997	DF	(England) Craig Fleming	(England) Norwich City	£600,000
5 September 1997	FW	(England) Ian Ormondroyd	(England) Scunthorpe United	£25,000
23 October 1997	MF	(England) Lee Richardson	(England) Huddersfield Town	£65,000
20 March 1998	FW	(England) Phil Starbuck	(England) Plymouth Argyle	Signed
23 March 1998	MF	(England) Andrew Hughes	(England) Notts County	Transfer
26 March 1998	FW	(England) Stuart Barlow	(England) Wigan Athletic	£45,000

Transfers in: ▼£450,000
Transfers out: ▲£735,000
Total spending: ▲£285,000
