= 1996–97 Oldham Athletic A.F.C. season =

Oldham Athletic
1996–97 season
- Chairman: Ian Stott
- Manager: (Scotland) Graeme Sharp (until February) (England) Neil Warnock (from February)
- Stadium: Boundary Park
- Football League First Division: 23rd (relegated)
- FA Cup: Third round
- League Cup: Third round
- Top goalscorer: Barlow (12)
- Highest home attendance: 12,992 vs. Manchester City (21 December 1996)
- Lowest home attendance: 2,975 vs. Grimsby Town (20 August 1996), League Cup
- Average home league attendance: 7,045
Home colours	Away colours

During the 1996–97 English football season, Oldham Athletic A.F.C. competed in the Football League First Division.

== Season summary ==
The 1996–97 season was a major struggle for Oldham which resulted in Graeme Sharp resigning in February. Sharp was succeeded by Neil Warnock, who had previously achieved promotion success with Scarborough, Notts County (twice), Huddersfield Town and Plymouth Argyle but was unable to save Oldham from relegation to the third tier for the first time in 23 years which was confirmed three months later following Bradford City's win against Charlton Athletic.

== Final league table ==
Pos	Team	Pld	W	D	L	GF	GA	GD	Pts	Qualification or relegation
20	Huddersfield Town	46	13	15	18	48	61	−13	54	
21	Bradford City	46	12	12	22	47	72	−25	48	
22	Grimsby Town (R)	46	11	13	22	59	81	−22	46	Relegation to the Second Division
23	Oldham Athletic (R)	46	10	13	23	51	66	−15	43	Relegation to the Second Division
24	Southend United (R)	46	8	15	23	42	85	−43	39	Relegation to the Second Division

Rules for classification: 1) Points; 2) Goals scored; 3) Goal difference
(R) Relegated

== Results ==
Oldham Athletic's score comes first

=== Legend ===
Win	Draw	Loss

=== Football League First Division ===
Date	Opponent	Venue	Result	Attendance	Scorers
17 August 1996	Stoke City	H	1–2	8,021	Redmond
24 August 1996	Crystal Palace	A	1–3	12,822	McCarthy
28 August 1996	Swindon Town	A	0–1	8,025	
31 August 1996	Ipswich Town	H	3–3	5,339	Rickers, Redmond, Banger
7 September 1996	Sheffield United	H	0–2	7,323	
10 September 1996	Birmingham City	A	0–0	17,228	
13 September 1996	Huddersfield Town	A	2–3	10,296	McCarthy (2)
21 September 1996	Barnsley	H	0–1	7,043	
28 September 1996	Charlton Athletic	A	0–1	12,178	
1 October 1996	West Bromwich Albion	H	1–1	5,817	Ormondroyd
5 October 1996	Port Vale	H	3–0	6,051	Ormondroyd (2), Banger
12 October 1996	Bolton Wanderers	A	1–3	14,813	Allott
16 October 1996	Norwich City	A	0–2	12,271	
19 October 1996	Reading	H	1–1	7,171	Örlygsson (pen)
26 October 1996	Southend United	H	0–0	6,606	
29 October 1996	Grimsby Town	A	3–0	3,532	Ormondroyd, Halle (2)
2 November 1996	Bradford City	A	3–0	10,855	Barlow (3)
9 November 1996	Portsmouth	H	0–0	7,639	
15 November 1996	Tranmere Rovers	A	1–1	8,327	Ormondroyd
23 November 1996	Oxford United	H	2–1	4,851	Barlow, Halle
30 November 1996	Southend United	A	1–1	5,001	Richardson (pen)
7 December 1996	Queens Park Rangers	H	0–2	5,590	
14 December 1996	Wolverhampton Wanderers	A	1–0	22,528	Ormondroyd
21 December 1996	Manchester City	H	2–1	12,992	Ormondroyd, Banger
28 December 1996	Sheffield United	A	2–2	16,130	Henry, Rickers
18 January 1997	West Bromwich Albion	A	1–1	12,103	Barlow
25 January 1997	Huddersfield Town	H	1–2	8,588	Richardson
1 February 1997	Portsmouth	A	0–1	9,135	
8 February 1997	Grimsby Town	H	0–3	6,549	
15 February 1997	Oxford United	A	1–3	6,868	Graham
22 February 1997	Bradford City	H	1–2	9,524	Ormondroyd
1 March 1997	Queens Park Rangers	A	1–0	10,180	Banger
4 March 1997	Tranmere Rovers	H	1–2	5,417	Örlygsson (penalty missed) , Banger
8 March 1997	Manchester City	A	0–1	30,729	
15 March 1997	Wolverhampton Wanderers	H	3–2	9,661	Rickers (2), Barlow
18 March 1997	Charlton Athletic	H	1–1	4,969	Barlow
23 March 1997	Crystal Palace	H	0–1	5,282	
29 March 1997	Stoke City	A	1–2	11,755	Barlow
31 March 1997	Swindon Town	H	5–1	5,699	Richardson (pen), Barlow (3), Rush
5 April 1997	Ipswich Town	A	0–4	11,730	
8 April 1997	Birmingham City	H	2–2	5,942	Richardson (pen), Reid
12 April 1997	Port Vale	A	2–3	11,701	Garnett, Duxbury
15 April 1997	Barnsley	A	0–2	17,476	
19 April 1997	Bolton Wanderers	H	0–0	10,702	
26 April 1997	Reading	A	0–2	8,301	Ritchie (penalty missed)
4 May 1997	Norwich City	H	3–0	5,562	McCarthy, Rush, Barlow

=== FA Cup ===
Round	Date	Opponent	Venue	Result	Attendance	Goalscorers
R3	5 January 1997	Barnsley	A	0–2	9,936	

=== League Cup ===
Round	Date	Opponent	Venue	Result	Attendance	Goalscorers
R1 First Leg	20 August 1996	Grimsby Town	H	0–1	2,975	
R1 Second Leg	3 September 1996	Grimsby Town	A	1–0 (won 5–4 on pens)	2,371	McCarthy
R2 First Leg	17 September 1996	Tranmere Rovers	H	2–2	3,094	Redmond, Richardson
R2 Second Leg	24 September 1996	Tranmere Rovers	A	1–0	3,711	Banger
R3	23 October 1996	Newcastle United	A	0–1	36,314	

== First-team squad ==
Note: Flags indicate national team as defined under FIFA eligibility rules; some limited exceptions apply. Players may hold more than one non-FIFA nationality.

No.	Pos.	Nation	Player
—	GK	(Republic of Ireland) IRL	Gary Kelly (Note: Kelly was born in Preston, England, but also qualified to represent the Republic of Ireland internationally through his father and represented them at U-19, U-21, U-23, and B level.)
—	GK	(England) ENG	Jon Hallworth
—	DF	(England) ENG	Craig Fleming
—	DF	(England) ENG	Mark Foran (on loan from Peterborough United)
—	DF	(England) ENG	Shaun Garnett
—	DF	(England) ENG	Richard Graham
—	DF	(England) ENG	Andy Holt
—	DF	(England) ENG	Steve Redmond
—	DF	(England) ENG	Carl Serrant
—	DF	(Norway) NOR	Gunnar Halle
—	DF	(Australia) AUS	Steve Ingham
—	MF	(England) ENG	Mark Allott
—	MF	(England) ENG	David Beresford
—	MF	(England) ENG	Lee Duxbury
—	MF	(England) ENG	John Gannon
—	MF	(England) ENG	Nick Henry

No.	Pos.	Nation	Player
—	MF	(England) ENG	Andrew Hughes
—	MF	(England) ENG	Martin Pemberton
—	MF	(England) ENG	Paul Reid
—	MF	(England) ENG	Lee Richardson
—	MF	(England) ENG	Paul Rickers
—	FW	(England) ENG	Andy Ritchie
—	MF	(England) ENG	Ian Snodin
—	MF	(Iceland) ISL	Þorvaldur Örlygsson
—	FW	(England) ENG	Nicky Banger
—	FW	(England) ENG	Stuart Barlow
—	FW	(England) ENG	David McNiven
—	FW	(England) ENG	Scott McNiven (Note: McNiven was born in Leeds, England, but also qualified to represent Scotland internationally through his father and represented them at U-21 level.)
—	FW	(England) ENG	Ian Ormondroyd
—	FW	(England) ENG	Matthew Rush
—	FW	(Wales) WAL	Sean McCarthy
—	FW	(Northern Ireland) NIR	John Morrow
