= 1995–96 Oldham Athletic A.F.C. season =

Oldham Athletic
1995–96 season
- Chairman: Ian Stott
- Manager: (Scotland) Graeme Sharp
- Stadium: Boundary Park
- Football League First Division: 18th
- FA Cup: Fourth round
- League Cup: Second round
- Anglo-Italian Cup: Group stage
- Top goalscorer: Richardson & McCarthy (11)
- Highest home attendance: 10,271
- Lowest home attendance: 4,225
- Average home league attendance: 6,634
Home colours	Away colours

During the 1995–96 English football season, Oldham Athletic A.F.C. competed in the Football League First Division.

== Final league table ==
Pos	Team	Pld	W	D	L	GF	GA	GD	Pts
16	Norwich City	46	14	15	17	59	55	+4	57
17	Grimsby Town	46	14	14	18	55	69	−14	56
18	Oldham Athletic	46	14	14	18	54	50	+4	56
19	Reading	46	13	17	16	54	63	−9	56
20	Wolverhampton Wanderers	46	13	16	17	56	62	−6	55

Rules for classification: 1) Points; 2) Goals scored; 3) Goal difference

== First-team squad ==
Squad at end of season

Note: Flags indicate national team as defined under FIFA eligibility rules; some limited exceptions apply. Players may hold more than one non-FIFA nationality.

No.	Pos.	Nation	Player
—	GK	ENG	Paul Gerrard
—	GK	ENG	Jon Hallworth
—	DF	ENG	Craig Fleming
—	DF	ENG	Richard Graham
—	DF	NOR	Gunnar Halle
—	DF	ENG	Andy Holt
—	DF	ENG	Richard Jobson
—	DF	ENG	Darren Lonergan
—	DF	ENG	Chris Makin
—	DF	ENG	Scott McNiven (Note: McNiven was born in Leeds, England, but also qualified to represent Scotland internationally through his father and represented them at U-21 level.)
—	DF	ENG	Neil Pointon
—	DF	ENG	Steve Redmond
—	DF	ENG	Carl Serrant
—	DF	ENG	Ian Snodin
—	DF	NED	Michel Vonk
—	MF	ENG	David Beresford
—	MF	SCO	Paul Bernard
—	MF	ENG	Mark Brennan

No.	Pos.	Nation	Player
—	MF	ENG	Nick Henry
—	MF	ENG	Andrew Hughes
—	MF	IRL	Brian Launders (on loan from Crystal Palace)
—	MF	ISL	Þorvaldur Örlygsson
—	MF	ENG	Martin Pemberton
—	MF	ENG	Lee Richardson
—	MF	ENG	Paul Rickers
—	FW	ENG	Mark Allott
—	FW	ENG	Nicky Banger
—	FW	ENG	Stuart Barlow
—	FW	ENG	Darren Beckford
—	FW	SCO	Gerry Creaney (on loan from Manchester City)
—	FW	ENG	Ian Olney
—	FW	WAL	Sean McCarthy
—	FW	ENG	David McNiven
—	FW	ENG	Lloyd Richardson
—	FW	ENG	Paul Wilkinson (on loan from Middlesbrough)
