= Mark Innes =

Scottish footballer

Personal information
- Full name: Mark Innes
- Date of birth: 27 September 1978 (age 48)
- Place of birth: Bellshill, Scotland
- Height: 5 ft 10 in (1.78 m)
- Position: Defender

Youth career
- Oldham Athletic

Senior career*
Years	Team	Apps	(Gls)
1997–2002	Oldham Athletic	73	(1)
2001–2002	→ Chesterfield (loan)	2	(2)
2002–2005	Chesterfield	74	(0)
2005–2006	Port Vale	28	(0)
2007–2009	Hyde United	57	(2)
2009–2011	New Mills	96	(1)
2011–2011	Mossley		
2011–201?	New Mills		
- * Club domestic league appearances and goals

Mark Innes (born 27 September 1978) is a Scottish former footballer who played as a defender.

He spent his nine-year professional career in the third tier of English football, making 177 league and 26 cup appearances. His career began with Oldham Athletic in 1997 and continued with Chesterfield between 2001 and 2005. He spent the final two years of his career playing for Port Vale, before a serious injury he sustained on trial at St Mirren ended his professional playing career. After becoming a qualified tiler, he turned out for non-League side Hyde United between 2007 and 2009 before moving on to New Mills for two years. In 2011, he signed with Mossley, but after just two months of the 2011–12 season, he was to return to New Mills.

== Career ==
Innes started his career with Second Division side Oldham Athletic, signing professional forms at the start of the 1997–98 season. He first established himself in the first-team in the 1999–2000 and 2000–01 campaigns, making 24 and 38 appearances over all competitions respectively.

Out of favour at the start of the 2001–02 season, he was loaned out to Chesterfield in December 2001 for one month. He scored on his club debut in a 2–2 draw with Brighton & Hove Albion on 21 December. He moved permanently to Saltergate at the end of his spell and finished the season with two goals and 23 appearances to his name. After he picked up a calf injury in September 2002, Innes was limited him to just ten games in 2002–03. However, his performance during 23 games in the 2003–04 campaign saw him rewarded with a new one-year contract. Following 22 appearances the following season, he was released by the club in March 2005.

He signed with Port Vale days after his release from Chesterfield, having impressed manager Martin Foyle on trial, and signed a twelve-month contract in June 2005. He was a first-team feature at Vale Park until February 2006, at which point he fell out of the first-team picture and was released when his contract was up at the end of the 2006–07 season. Back in his native Scotland, he went on trial at Partick Thistle and then St Mirren, where an Achilles injury ended his professional career, also leaving him with a lengthy rehabilitation period.

He returned to England and joined Conference North club Hyde United in 2007 whilst also working as a tiler – he had come into the tiling profession after the PFA helped him onto a training course. Enjoying regular first-team football with 67 performances over two seasons, he was not offered a new contract in summer 2009.

Upon his release from Hyde, Innes dropped several divisions to join New Mills in the North West Counties Football League. Following a second-place finish in 2009–10, New Mills won promotion out of the Premier Division in the 2010–11 season, finishing as champions with 102 points. They were rewarded with a place in the Northern Premier League Division One South. In June 2011 he joined Mossley in the Northern Premier League Division One North. The "Lilywhites" finished in 14th place in 2011–12. However, Innes was to play little part in the season as he rejoined New Mills at the end of September 2011 and made his second debut for the club in the 2–2 away draw at Shepshed Dynamo on 1 October 2011. The club finished in ninth place in 2011–12.

== Career statistics ==
Appearances and goals by club, season and competition
Club	Season	League			FA Cup		League Cup		Other		Total	
Club	Season	Division	Apps	Goals	Apps	Goals	Apps	Goals	Apps	Goals	Apps	Goals
Oldham Athletic	1997–98	Second Division	4	0	0	0	0	0	1 (Note: Appearance(s) in the EFL Trophy.)	0	5	0
Oldham Athletic	1998–99	Second Division	13	1	0	0	0	0	0	0	13	1
Oldham Athletic	1999–2000	Second Division	21	0	1	0	2	0	0	0	24	0
Oldham Athletic	2000–01	Second Division	30	0	3	0	4	0	1	0	38	0
Oldham Athletic	2001–02	Second Division	5	0	2	0	1	0	2	0	10	0
Oldham Athletic	Total		73	1	6	0	7	0	4	0	90	1
Chesterfield	2001–02	Second Division	23	2	0	0	0	0	0	0	23	2
Chesterfield	2002–03	Second Division	10	0	0	0	0	0	0	0	10	0
Chesterfield	2003–04	Second Division	22	0	0	0	0	0	1	0	23	0
Chesterfield	2004–05	League One	21	0	0	0	1	0	0	0	22	0
Chesterfield	Total		76	2	0	0	1	0	1	0	78	2
Port Vale	2004–05	League One	5	0	—		—		—		5	0
Port Vale	2005–06	League One	23	0	5	0	0	0	1	0	29	0
Port Vale	Total		28	0	5	0	0	0	1	0	34	0
Hyde United	2007–08	Conference North	32	1	0	0	—		6	0	38	1
Hyde United	2008–09	Conference North	25	1	0	0	—		4	0	29	1
Hyde United	Total (Note: Statistics for New Mills and Mossley not recorded.)		57	2	0	0	0	0	10	0	67	2
Career total			234	5	11	0	8	0	16	0	269	5

== Honours ==
New Mills

- North West Counties Football League Premier Division: 2010–11
