= Lee Hardy =

English footballer

Personal information
- Full name: Lee Hardy
- Date of birth: 26 November 1981 (age 44)
- Place of birth: Blackpool, England
- Height: 6 ft 0 in (1.83 m)
- Position: Midfielder

Youth career
- Blackburn Rovers

Senior career*
| Years | Team | Apps | (Gls) |
| 2000–2001 | Blackburn Rovers | 0 | (0) |
| 2001–2002 | Oldham Athletic | 1 | (0) |
| 2002–2003 | Macclesfield Town | 16 | (0) |
| 2003 | Hucknall Town | | |
| 2003 | Leigh RMI | | |
| 2003–2004 | Ayr United | 21 | (3) |
| 2004–2005 | St Johnstone | 13 | (0) |
| 2005–2006 | Hamilton Academical | 17 | (4) |
- * Club domestic league appearances and goals

Lee Hardy (born 26 November 1981) is an English former professional footballer who played as a midfielder in the Football League for Oldham Athletic and Macclesfield Town and in the Scottish League for Ayr United, St Johnstone and Hamilton Academical. He began his football career as a trainee with Blackburn Rovers, without playing for the first team, and also played non-league football for Hucknall Town and Leigh RMI. He retired from football on medical advice in January 2006, aged 24, after suffering an ankle injury.
