= Danny Boshell =

English footballer (born 1981)

Personal information
- Full name: Daniel Kevin Boshell
- Date of birth: 30 May 1981 (age 45)
- Place of birth: Bradford, England
- Position: Midfielder

Team information
- Current team: Guiseley (assistant manager)

Youth career
- Oldham Athletic

Senior career*
Years	Team	Apps	(Gls)
1999–2005	Oldham Athletic	70	(2)
2005	→ Bury (loan)	6	(0)
2005–2006	Stockport County	33	(1)
2006–2010	Grimsby Town	99	(11)
2010	Chesterfield	9	(0)
2010–2013	Guiseley	83	(7)
2013	→ Altrincham (loan)	9	(0)
2013	Altrincham	7	(0)
2013–2016	Guiseley	113	(3)
2016–2020	Bradford Park Avenue	87	(9)
2023	Bradford Park Avenue	0	(0)
Total		440	(32)

Managerial career
- 2013–2016: Guiseley (playing assistant)
- 2016–2024: Bradford Park Avenue (assistant)
- 2024–: Guiseley (assistant)
- * Club domestic league appearances and goals as of 21:12, 5 September 2019 (UTC)

Daniel Kevin Boshell (born 30 May 1981) is an English football coach and former professional footballer who is assistant manager of Guiseley.

As a player he was a midfielder between 1999 and 2020 playing most of his career in the Football League, notably for Grimsby Town where he made 118 appearances in all competitions. He also played as a professional for Oldham Athletic, Stockport County, Bury and Chesterfield before finishing his career in non-league football with Guiseley, Altrincham and Bradford Park Avenue.

== Playing career ==
=== Oldham Athletic ===
Boshell spent 6 years at Oldham Athletic after coming through their youth system and by 2004 was their longest serving player, Boshell finally left the club in 2005 after a loan spell at Bury. He turned out 70 times in the league for The Latics, scoring twice.

=== Stockport County ===
Boshell signed for Stockport County for the 2005–06 season and played 33 times in the league, scoring one goal. He was released at the end of the season.

=== Grimsby Town ===
Boshell was given a pre season trial by Grimsby in the summer of 2006 by Graham Rodger and earned a non-contracted squad position, joining on 25 August. He made his league debut against Macclesfield Town in a 1–1 draw at Blundell Park, and was offered a deal to keep him at the club until the end of the season.

In 2007–08 Boshell helped Grimsby Town reach the final of the Football League Trophy. However, in the final he missed a penalty when the score was 0-0 and Grimsby went on to lose 2–0.

During the 2008–2009 season under Mike Newell he was used as a utility player, and in the 2009–10 season, Poor form saw him fall out of favour under Newell, and his eventual replacement Neil Woods following a poor disciplinary record, in which he was sent off twice in the first couple of months of the season.

Boshell continued to struggle to break into the Grimsby first team and on 13 January 2010, Woods told Boshell he was free to leave the club in the January transfer window. On 1 February 2010, Boshells contract was terminated.

=== Chesterfield ===
Boshell appeared 9 times for the club in the closing stages of the 09/10 season, Boshell was released at the end of the season.

=== Guiseley ===
On 27 August 2010, Boshell signed for Non-League side Guiseley. Boshell made 33 league appearances during the season. Boshell was eventually joined by his brother Nicky at the club.

After approaching directors attempting to have manager Steve Kittrick removed from his post, Boshell and his younger brother Nicky were placed on the transfer list. On 15 March 2013 Boshell joined Altrincham on loan for the remainder of the 2012–13 season. Boshell played just 8 times for Altrincham and eventually returned to Guiseley on 22 April 2013.

=== Altrincham ===
On 17 May 2013 he signed permanently for Altrincham. Boshell played 7 times for Altrincham before departing the club in October 2013.

=== Return to Guiseley ===
In October 2013, Danny re joined Guiseley as player assistant manager under new manager Mark Bower reaching the Play off final against his old club Altrincham F.C. but was unable to play.

He left the club and retired from his playing career on 22 August 2016.

== Coaching career ==
=== Bradford Park Avenue ===
In September 2016, Boshell came out of retirement to join Bradford Park Avenue, also taking on the role of assistant manager to his former teammate at Guiseley, Mark Bower.

In July 2019, alongside Bower, Boshell departed Bradford Park Avenue.

In November 2019 Boshell returned as Assistant and again signed on as a player

On 27 February 2023, Boshell came out of retirement due to a shortage of players for their National League North tie with Scarborough Athletic, he was an unused substitute.

=== Guiseley ===
Boshell returned to Guiseley alongside Mark Bower in 2024.

== Personal life ==
Boshell has a brother called Nicky who also plays football, Nicky used to be a teammate of Danny at Guiseley. Nicky although coming through the youth ranks at Huddersfield Town has only played at a semi-professional level and went on to play for Brighouse Town and Bradford Park Avenue.

== Career statistics ==
As of match played 16 December 2017

Appearances and goals by club, season and competition
Club	Season	League			FA Cup		League Cup		Other		Total	
Club	Season	Division	Apps	Goals	Apps	Goals	Apps	Goals	Apps	Goals	Apps	Goals
Oldham Athletic	1999–2000	Second Division	8	0	0	0	0	0	0	0	8	0
Oldham Athletic	2000–01	Second Division	18	1	2	0	3	1	1 (Note: Appearances in Football League Trophy)	0	24	2
Oldham Athletic	2001–02	Second Division	4	0	0	0	0	0	0	0	4	0
Oldham Athletic	2002–03	Second Division	2	0	0	0	0	0	0	0	2	0
Oldham Athletic	2003–04	Second Division	22	0	2	0	1	0	2	1	27	1
Oldham Athletic	2004–05	League One	16	1	2	0	2	0	0	0	20	1
Oldham Athletic	Total		70	2	6	0	6	1	3	1	85	4
Bury (loan)	2004–05	League Two	6	0	—		—		0	0	6	0
Stockport County	2005–06	League Two	33	1	1	1	3	0	1	0	38	2
Grimsby Town	2006–07	League Two	29	2	2	0	0	0	2	0	33	2
Grimsby Town	2007–08	League Two	40	6	1	0	1	0	6	1	48	7
Grimsby Town	2008–09	League Two	24	3	1	0	1	0	2	0	28	3
Grimsby Town	2009–10	League Two	6	0	1	0	1	0	1	0	9	0
Grimsby Town	Total		99	11	5	0	3	0	11	1	118	12
Chesterfield	2009–10	League Two	9	0	—		—		—		9	0
Guiseley	2010–11	Conference North	33	0	1	0	—		7 (Note: Five appearances and a goal in FA Trophy; two appearances in Conference North play-offs)	1	41	1
Guiseley	2011–12	Conference North	32	5	0	0	—		5 (Note: Three appearances in FA Trophy and two in Conference North play-offs)	0	37	5
Guiseley	2012–13	Conference North	18	2	2	1	—		1 (Note: Appearances in the FA Trophy)	0	21	3
Guiseley	Total		83	7	3	1	0	0	13	1	99	9
Altrincham (loan)	2012–13	Conference North	9	0	—		—		1 (Note: Appearance in Conference North play-offs)	0	10	0
Altrincham	2013–14	Conference North	7	0	0	0	—		0	0	7	0
Guiseley	2013–14	Conference North	30	0	0	0	—		5 (Note: Three appearances in the FA Trophy and two in the Conference North play-offs)	0	35	0
Guiseley	2014–15	Conference North	40	1	1	0	—		4 (Note: One appearance in FA Trophy; three appearances and a goal in Conference North play-offs)	1	45	2
Guiseley	2015–16	National League	28	2	2	0	—		3	0	33	2
Guiseley	2016–17	National League	15	0	0	0	—		0	0	15	0
Guiseley	Total		113	3	3	0	0	0	12	1	128	4
Bradford Park Avenue	2016–17	National League North	29	3	0	0	—		0	0	29	3
Bradford Park Avenue	2017–18	National League North	11	0	0	0	—		0	0	11	0
Bradford Park Avenue	Total		40	3	0	0	0	0	0	0	40	3
Career total			469	27	18	2	12	1	41	4	540	34

== Honours ==
Grimsby Town

- Football League Trophy runner-up: 2007–08

Individual

- Conference North Team of the Year: 2014–15
