= Cristian Colusso =

Argentine association football player

Personal information
- Full name: Cristian Daniel Colusso Peralta
- Date of birth: 7 February 1977 (age 49)
- Place of birth: Santa Fe, Argentina
- Position: Midfielder

Senior career*
Years	Team	Apps	(Gls)
1994–1996	Rosario Central		
1996–1997	Sevilla F.C.	6	(0)
1997–1998	Club León	14	(0)
1999	Rosario Central		
2000-2002	Atlético Tucumán	19	(2)
2002	→ Oldham Athletic A.F.C. (loan)	13	(2)
2002	Carrarese Calcio		
2003	Club Almirante Brown	6	(0)
2004	USM Blida		
2005	C.D. Universidad Católica del Ecuador		
2006	Deportivo Anzoátegui		
2007	San Martín de Mendoza	8	(0)
2007–2008	Football Club Liberty		
2008	Club Atlético Pujato		
- * Club domestic league appearances and goals

Cristian Colusso (born 7 February 1977) is an Argentine retired footballer who now works as a coach at Club Atlético San Telmo in Argentina.

== Career ==
Born in Rosario, Santa Fe, Colusso began his professional football career with local side Rosario Central in the Argentine Primera División. At age 19, Colusso moved to Spain to join Sevilla F.C. However, after making only 6 La Liga appearances, he was forced out of the team through a scandal involving falsified signatures on his transfer documents.

In 2002 he spent 4 months on loan at Oldham Athletic notably scoring a last minute equaliser against Bury.
