= Mark Allott =

English footballer

Personal information
- Full name: Mark Stephen Allott
- Date of birth: 3 October 1977 (age 49)
- Place of birth: Middleton, England
- Height: 6 ft 0 in (1.83 m)
- Position: Midfielder

Senior career*
Years	Team	Apps	(Gls)
1995–2002	Oldham Athletic	154	(31)
2001–2002	→ Chesterfield (loan)	10	(2)
2002–2007	Chesterfield	211	(9)
2007–2009	Oldham Athletic	87	(7)
2009	Tranmere Rovers	0	(0)
2009–2012	Chesterfield	125	(3)
2013	Hyde	5	(0)
Total		592	(52)
- * Club domestic league appearances and goals

Mark Stephen Allott (born 3 October 1977) is an English former footballer.

== Career ==
=== Oldham Athletic ===
Allott initially came through the youth ranks and was highly rated as a centre forward, scoring on his debut as a substitute in a defeat against Bolton Wanderers at Burnden Park in October 1996. When Manager Neil Warnock left the club in 1998 and took a lot of the first team with him Allott featured more in Andy Ritchie's team. His second season saw him finish the campaign as top goalscorer with 12 goals and the following season he was ever present and finished with 8 goals. However, in the Summer of 2001, the club was taken over by millionaire Chris Moore who promised to bring in better quality players and despite Allott starting the season in the first team when manager Ritchie was sacked in early November new manager Mick Wadsworth had the money to bring in his own players and he was loaned out and eventually sold to Chesterfield in January 2002.

=== Chesterfield ===
At Chesterfield, Allott had a limited return as a goalscorer and was switched to a right midfield role after the arrival of manager Roy McFarland in 2003, later becoming firmly established in central midfield.

=== Oldham Athletic ===
He returned to Oldham in 2007 as a replacement for Richie Wellens, this time as a central midfielder. His game had improved in this role and his first season back saw him sweep up at the club's Player of the Season awards. However, the following season saw his defensive partner Garry McDonald depart the club to be replaced by Danny Whitaker and although the club started the season well, gaps in the midfield in some games led the club to falter badly from a position in the play-offs to midtable by the end of the season and new manager Dave Penney chose not to keep him at the club.

=== Chesterfield ===
In the summer of 2009, Allot returned to Chesterfield having initially signed a two-year contract with Tranmere Rovers, becoming the club's first signing in the 2009 summer transfer window. However, on 27 July 2009, after managerial changes at both clubs, it was confirmed that Allott had signed a two-year deal with Chesterfield under former Oldham boss John Sheridan, having been released from his contract by Tranmere after only 8 weeks without ever playing a competitive game for the club.

Allott was part of the 2010–11 squad that won League Two and served the club until November 2012 when his contract was cancelled by new manager Paul Cook.

=== Hyde ===
On 4 January 2013 he signed for Conference Premier club Hyde. On 1 March 2013 he announced his retirement after just five games for the team, due to injuries.

== Career statistics ==
Club	Season	Division	League		FA Cup		League Cup		Other		Total	
Club	Season	Division	Apps	Goals	Apps	Goals	Apps	Goals	Apps	Goals	Apps	Goals
Oldham Athletic	1996–97	First Division	5	1	0	0	0	0	0	0	5	1
Oldham Athletic	1997–98	Second Division	22	2	4	0	1	0	1 (Note: Appearance(s) in Football League Trophy)	0	28	2
Oldham Athletic	1998–99	Second Division	41	7	3	0	2	1	1	0	47	8
Oldham Athletic	1999–2000	Second Division	32	10	3	0	2	1	1	0	38	11
Oldham Athletic	2000–01	Second Division	39	7	3	0	4	0	0	0	46	7
Oldham Athletic	2001–02	Second Division	15	4	2	0	1	0	2	0	20	4
Oldham Athletic	Total		154	31	15	0	10	2	5		184	31
Chesterfield (loan)	2001–02	Second Division	10	2	0	0	0	0	0	0	10	2
Chesterfield	2001–02	Second Division	11	2	0	0	0	0	0	0	11	2
Chesterfield	2002–03	Second Division	33	0	1	0	2	1	2	1	38	2
Chesterfield	2003–04	Second Division	40	2	1	0	1	0	2	0	44	2
Chesterfield	2004–05	League One	45	2	1	0	1	1	1	0	48	3
Chesterfield	2005–06	League One	43	3	2	0	1	0	1	0	47	3
Chesterfield	2006–07	League One	39	0	0	0	4	0	2	0	45	0
Chesterfield	Total		221	11	5	0	9	2	8		243	14
Oldham Athletic	2007–08	League One	42	4	5	0	1	0	2	0	50	4
Oldham Athletic	2008–09	League One	45	3	2	0	2	0	1	0	50	3
Oldham Athletic	Total		87	7	7	0	3	0	3		100	7
Tranmere Rovers	2009–10	League One	0	0	0	0	0	0	0	0	0	0
Chesterfield	2009–10	League Two	45	2	1	0	1	0	3	0	50	2
Chesterfield	2010–11	League Two	36	0	2	0	1	0	1	0	40	0
Chesterfield	2011–12	League One	36	1	1	0	1	0	5	0	43	1
Chesterfield	2012–13	League Two	8	0	0	0	1	0	0	0	9	0
Chesterfield	Total		125	3	4	0	4	0	9		142	3
Hyde	2012–13	Conference Premier	5	0	0	0	0	0	0	0	5	0
Career total			592	52	31	0	26	4	25	1	674	57

== Honours ==
Chesterfield

- Football League Two: 2010–11
- Football League Trophy: 2011–12
