= Jordan Tait =

English footballer

Personal information
- Full name: Jordan Alexander Tait
- Date of birth: 27 September 1979 (age 47)
- Place of birth: Berwick-upon-Tweed, England
- Positions: Defender; central midfielder

Senior career*
Years	Team	Apps	(Gls)
1998–1999	Newcastle United	0	(0)
1999–2000	Oldham Athletic	1	(0)
2000–2001	Darlington	3	(0)
2001–2003	Arbroath	48	(1)
2003–2004	Ross County	19	(1)
2004	Ayr United	11	(0)
2004–2005	St Johnstone	14	(0)
2005	Berwick Rangers	0	(0)
2005	Stenhousemuir	1	(0)
Total		97	(2)
- * Club domestic league appearances and goals

Jordan Alexander Tait (born 27 September 1979) is an English former professional footballer. He most recently worked as an individual player development coach for Polish club Lechia Gdańsk.

Tait began his professional career at Newcastle United and played in the English Football League for Darlington and Oldham Athletic. He also played in Scotland for Arbroath, Ross County, Ayr United and St Johnstone.

Given his first professional contract by Kenny Dalglish in 1998, Tait began coaching while still playing and studied for his UEFA coaching qualifications, gaining the UEFA A Licence, UEFA Elite Youth A Licence and the FA Advanced Youth Award as well as qualifications in Sport Science, Psychology and Talent Identification. Following retirement through injury, he moved into full-time coaching. He has since worked under managers such as Dalglish, Kevin Keegan, Ruud Gullit, John Carver, Alan Irvine and Tommy Burns.

In 2023, Tait graduated from Manchester Metropolitan University with a Masters in Sporting Directorship.
