= Ryan Sugden =

English footballer

Personal information
- Full name: Ryan Stephen Sugden
- Date of birth: 26 December 1980 (age 45)
- Place of birth: Bradford, England
- Position: Striker

Team information
- Current team: FC Halifax Town

Senior career*
Years	Team	Apps	(Gls)
1998–2002	Oldham Athletic	20	(1)
2002	Scarborough	13	(2)
2002–2003	Chester City	31	(12)
2003	Burton Albion	4	(0)
2003–2004	Morecambe	28	(4)
2004–2007	Halifax Town	83	(22)
2007–2008	Farsley Celtic	17	(2)
2008	Bradford Park Avenue	0	(0)
2008–	FC Halifax Town	0	(0)
- * Club domestic league appearances and goals as of 21:05, 18 July 2008 (UTC)

Ryan Stephen Sugden (born 26 December 1980 in Bradford, West Yorkshire) is a professional footballer, who plays for Bradford Park Avenue. He was released by Morecambe at the end of the 2003/04 season and signed by Halifax on a free transfer in July 2004. In January 2007, he was given a further free transfer, this time to Farsley. In July 2008 he signed for Bradford Park Avenue. His spell at Bradford was only short and at the end of the month he was on the move again, this time to the newly formed FC Halifax Town.

Sugden is a striker who has previously played for Oldham Athletic, Scarborough, Chester City, Burton Albion, Morecambe and Halifax Town. He turned down a move to York City on 31 August 2006.

== Honours ==
Individual

- Football Conference Goalscorer of the Month: September 2002
