= Paul Jones (footballer, born 1978) =

English footballer (born 1978)

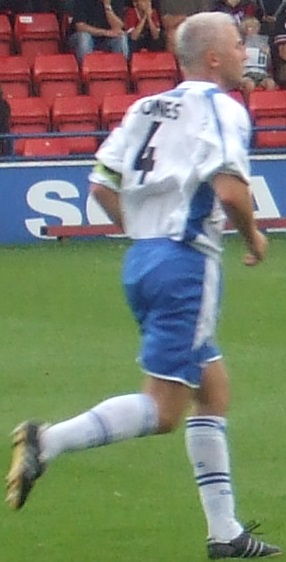
- Jones playing for Barrow in 2008

Personal information
- Full name: Paul Jones
- Date of birth: 3 June 1978 (age 48)
- Place of birth: Liverpool, England
- Position: Defender

Team information
- Current team: Marine

Youth career
- ??–1996: Tranmere Rovers

Senior career*
Years	Team	Apps	(Gls)
1996–1997	Tranmere Rovers	0	(0)
1997	→ Blackpool (loan)	0	(0)
1997–1999	Barrow	87	(3)
1999	Leigh RMI	?	(?)
1999–2002	Oldham Athletic	26	(2)
2003–2006	Hyde United	105	(6)
2006–2011	Barrow	162	(8)
2011–2011	→ Droylsden (loan)		
2011	Altrincham	7	(0)
2011–?	Vauxhall Motors	21	(0)
2012	Airbus UK Broughton		
2012–2013	Marine		

Managerial career
- 2007: Barrow (caretaker)
- * Club domestic league appearances and goals as of 17:31, 3 March 2012 (UTC)

Paul Jones (born 3 June 1978) is an English former footballer who last played for Marine. He plays as a centre back. Jones had two spells with Barrow. He has also played with Leigh RMI, Hyde United and in the Football League with Blackpool and Oldham Athletic. He was born in Liverpool.

== Career ==
Jones began his career with local Merseyside club Tranmere Rovers, but failed to make any appearances. He did have a brief period on loan with Blackpool, before being released. Jones then joined Barrow for the start of the 1997–98 season, then of the Unibond Premier League. He played regularly for the club, and was part of the championship winning team. Despite Barrow's money problems the following season in the Football Conference, he remained with Barrow before they were demoted on financial grounds.

Leigh RMI of the Northern Premier League were Jones' next club, but his form attracted the attention of Oldham Athletic of the Football League Second Division. He played seventeen times for Oldham in the second half of the 1999–2000 season, but struggled with an injury sustained early in the following season. He remained with the club, but did not play for them at all in 2001 or until leaving in Summer 2002.

Following his injury struggle, Jones returned to football at a lower level in 2003, with Hyde United of the Northern Premier League. Hyde were relegated to the Northern Premier League First Division for the start of the 2003–04 season, but Jones became a regular as the club won promotion in 2004 and 2005. After helping Hyde stay in the Conference North, which had been introduced below the Conference National in 2004, Jones returned to Barrow AFC for the 2006–07 season.

Barrow were also in the Conference North, and flirted with relegation under manager Phil Wilson throughout Jones' first season and into the next. Wilson was sacked in November 2007, and Jones was one of the three players chosen as Barrow's temporary player-managers. Following a series of impressive results, his two co-managers, Darren Sheridan and Dave Bayliss, were hired permanently managers while Jones focused on playing duties as club captain with a coaching role. Barrow continued to be successful and Jones remained a key part of the team as Barrow won promotion via the play-offs, following a twenty match unbeaten streak. Jones remained with the club, returning to the Conference National in which he had competed with Barrow some ten seasons previously.

On 1 March 2011, Jones joined Conference North side Droylsden on a one-month loan in a bid to improve his match fitness. In May 2011 he played his final game for Barrow, ending a seven-year association with the club.

In July 2011 he joined Altrincham.

In September 2011 Jones was released by Altrincham but wasted no time in signing for league rivals Vauxhall Motors.

In August 2012 he joined Welsh Premier League side Airbus UK Broughton but by October 2012 he had moved on, signing for Marine. He left Marine in February 2013.

== Honours ==
=== Club ===
Barrow

- Northern Premier League Premier Division: 1997–98
- Conference North play-off winner: 2007–08
- FA Trophy: 2009–10

Hyde United

- Northern Premier League First Division: 2003–04
- Northern Premier League Premier Division: 2004–05
