= Doug Hodgson =

Australian soccer player

Personal information
- Full name: Douglas John Hodgson
- Date of birth: 27 February 1969 (age 57)
- Place of birth: Frankston, Australia
- Height: 6 ft 3 in (1.91 m)
- Positions: Defender; centre-back; striker

Senior career*
Years	Team	Apps	(Gls)
1991–1994	Heidelberg United	52	(1)
1994	Dianella Serbia		
1994–1997	Sheffield United	62	(1)
1995	→ Plymouth Argyle (loan)	6	(0)
1996	→ Burnley (loan)	1	(0)
1997–1998	Oldham Athletic	62	(4)
1998	→ Northampton Town (loan)	10	(1)
- * Club domestic league appearances and goals

Douglas John Hodgson (born 27 February 1969) is an Australian former professional soccer player who played as a defender.
