= Barry Prenderville =

Irish footballer

Personal information
- Full name: Barry James Robert Prenderville
- Date of birth: 16 October 1976 (age 50)
- Place of birth: Dublin, Ireland
- Position: Defender

Youth career
- 1993–1998: Coventry City

Senior career*
Years	Team	Apps	(Gls)
1998–1999	Coventry City	0	(0)
1998	→ Hibernian (loan)	13	(2)
1999–2000	Ayr United	5	(0)
1999–2000	St Patrick's Athletic	15	(0)
2000–2002	Oldham Athletic	21	(0)
2002–2003	Shelbourne	22	(2)
2003–2005	St Patrick's Athletic	75	(2)
2006	Shamrock Rovers	2	(0)
Total		153	(6)

International career
1993	Republic of Ireland U16	2	(4)
- * Club domestic league appearances and goals

Barry James Robert Prenderville (born 16 October 1976 in Dublin) is an Irish former footballer.

Prenderville was an underage international player for Ireland when he signed for Coventry City from Cherry Orchard as a schoolboy. Having failed to make a first team appearance for Coventry, Prenderville went on loan to Scottish club Hibernian. Prenderville had a successful loan spell with Hibs, but had to return to Coventry in December 1998 after the two clubs failed to agree a fee for a permanent transfer.

Prenderville was eventually released by Coventry in 1999. His form with Hibs earned him a move to Ayr United; this move did not work well, however, and he returned to Ireland with St Patrick's Athletic after making only six appearances for Ayr. Six months later, however, Prenderville returned to English football with Oldham. He was a consistent squad member at Boundary Park, but financial difficulties affected the club in 2002, and Prenderville was one of the players who were offloaded.

Barry once again returned to Dublin in 2002, but this time with Shelbourne. He scored 3 goals in a total of 18 appearances including 2 in the Champions League qualifiers.

When Eamonn Collins became St Pats manager in February 2003, he made Prenderville one of his first signings. His first season back at Richmond Park could be seen as somewhat of a personal success, as he made 39 appearances in all competitions. Prenderville played at right back, centre-half and in midfield.

Prenderville was released by St Pats at the end of the 2005 season, and signed for Shamrock Rovers. He made his debut at Terryland Park in June 2006 but after only 2 league appearances Prenderville was released by the club in July 2006 "due to other commitments", which meant that he was "unable to participate fully with the first team's training schedule".

He played in the 1993 UEFA European Under-16 Football Championship.

Prenderville is currently a Football Association of Ireland facilitator and head coach at Ballyfermot United in the Leinster Senior League.
