= Craig Dudley =

English footballer

Personal information
- Date of birth: 12 September 1979 (age 47)
- Place of birth: Newark-on-Trent, England
- Position: Striker

Youth career
- Notts County

Senior career*
Years	Team	Apps	(Gls)
1996–1999	Notts County	31	(3)
1998	→ Shrewsbury Town (loan)	4	(0)
1999	→ Hull City (loan)	7	(2)
1999	→ Telford United (loan)	?	(?)
1999–2002	Oldham Athletic	60	(10)
1999	→ Chesterfield (loan)	2	(0)
2002	→ Scunthorpe United (loan)	4	(0)
2002–2005	Burton Albion	91	(10)
2005	Hyde United	8	(0)
2005–2006	Ashton United	?	(0)
Total		207	(25)
- * Club domestic league appearances and goals as of 27 February 2008

Craig Dudley (born 12 September 1979) is an English footballer who has played for Notts County (where he spent loan spells at Shrewsbury Town, Hull City and Telford United), Oldham Athletic (where he spent loan spells at Chesterfield and Scunthorpe United), Burton Albion, Hyde United and Ashton United.

Retired from playing due to injury and became a full-time driving instructor.

== Honours ==
Notts County

- Football League Third Division: 1997–98
