= Stuart Thom =

English footballer

Personal information
- Date of birth: 27 December 1976 (age 49)
- Place of birth: Dewsbury, West Yorkshire, England
- Height: 6 ft 2 in (1.88 m)
- Position: Defender

Senior career*
Years	Team	Apps	(Gls)
1994–1998	Nottingham Forest	0	(0)
1997–1998	→ Mansfield Town (loan)	5	(0)
1998–2000	Oldham Athletic	34	(3)
2000	→ Scunthorpe United (loan)	5	(0)
2000–2002	Scunthorpe United	36	(2)
2002–2008	Barrow	-	(-)
- * Club domestic league appearances and goals

Stuart Thom (born 27 December 1976) is an English former footballer who played in the Football League for Mansfield Town, Oldham Athletic and Scunthorpe United.
