= Paul Beavers =

English footballer

Personal information
- Date of birth: 2 October 1978 (age 48)
- Place of birth: Hastings, England
- Position: Forward

Senior career*
| Years | Team | Apps | (Gls) |
| 1996–1999 | Sunderland | 0 | (0) |
| 1998 | → Shrewsbury Town (loan) | 2 | (0) |
| 1998–1999 | → Ethnikos Piraeus (loan) | 9 | (2) |
| 1999 | → Oldham Athletic (loan) | 7 | (2) |
| 1999–2001 | Oldham Athletic | 4 | (0) |
| 2000 | → Hartlepool United (loan) | 7 | (0) |
| 2000–2001 | → Darlington (loan) | 7 | (1) |
| 2002–2003 | Shelbourne | 8 | (1) |
- * Club domestic league appearances and goals

Paul Beavers (born 2 October 1978) is a former professional footballer who played in The Football League for Shrewsbury Town, Oldham Athletic, Hartlepool United and Darlington.
