= Carlo Corazzin =

Canadian soccer player (born 1971)

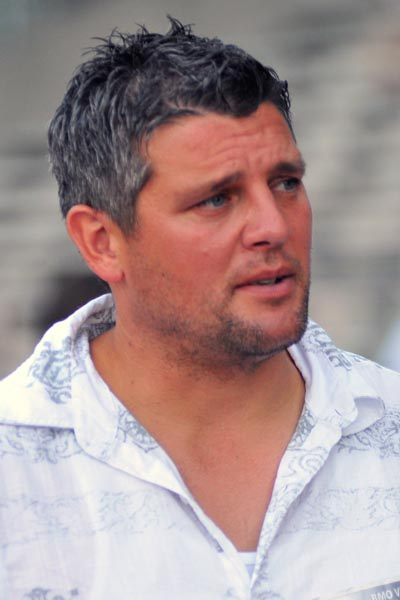
- Corazzin pictured in 2009

Personal information
- Full name: Giancarlo Michele Corazzin
- Date of birth: December 25, 1971 (age 54)
- Place of birth: New Westminster, British Columbia, Canada
- Height: 5 ft 11 in (1.80 m)
- Position: Forward

Senior career*
Years	Team	Apps	(Gls)
1992	Winnipeg Fury	24	(10)
1993	Vancouver 86ers	24	(7)
1994–1996	Cambridge United	105	(39)
1996–1998	Plymouth Argyle	74	(23)
1998–2000	Northampton Town	78	(30)
2000–2002	Oldham Athletic	110	(20)
2003–2006	Vancouver Whitecaps	53	(14)
Total		468	(143)

International career
1994–2004	Canada	59	(11)
Medal record
Representing Canada
Men's soccer
CONCACAF Gold Cup
Winner	2000 United States
- * Club domestic league appearances and goals

Giancarlo Michele "Carlo" Corazzin (born December 25, 1971) is a Canadian retired professional soccer player who played as a forward for Winnipeg Fury, Vancouver 86ers, Cambridge United, Plymouth Argyle, Northampton Town, Oldham Athletic and Vancouver Whitecaps at club level. At international level, he was capped 59 times for the Canada national team, scoring 11 goals.

== Club career ==
Corazzin began his career with Winnipeg Fury of the Canadian Soccer League in 1992, scoring 10 goals in 24 games and helping the team win the CSL Championship. In 1993, Corazzin signed with the Vancouver Whitecaps of the A-League (now known as the USL First Division, where he finished second in the team's scoring charts with 7 goals in 24 games.

Corazzin signed with Cambridge United of the English Second Division (now known as League 1) on December 10, 1993, scoring 43 goals in 117 games over two-and-a-half seasons. In his final year with Cambridge, the team was relegated, and on March 28, 1996, Corazzin signed with Plymouth Argyle for a transfer fee of £150 000. In two-and-a-half seasons at Argyle, Corazzin scored 24 goals in 86 games.

Corazzin joined Northampton Town of the third division on June 26, 1998, netting 32 goals in 89 games over two seasons. Northampton Town were relegated in 1999, but with Corazzin's help, the club regained promotion in 2000.

=== Oldham Athletic ===
On July 28, 2000, after a successful CONCACAF Gold Cup with Canada, Corazzin signed with Oldham Athletic and scored 22 goals in 129 games over three seasons. His finest moment with Oldham came in a match against Wrexham when Corazzin scored 4 in a 5–1 victory in 2001, finishing it off with his trademark celebration "The Carlo Spin". He was also present in the side which made the 2002/03 play-off and scored the winning goal in that season's League Cup against Premiership side West Ham United.

=== Return to Canada ===
In 2003, Corazzin re-signed with Vancouver Whitecaps, where he scored 7 goals in a 13-game undefeated streak. Corazzin played with the Whitecaps for 3 years until he was released in 2006.

== International career ==
Corazzin made his Canada national team debut on June 1, 1994, in a 1–1 tie with Morocco. Corazzin scored the majority of his international goals between 1999–2000 and formed an effective striker partnership with Paul Peschisolido for Canada over the years. In 2000, Corazzin won the Golden Boot as top scorer of the CONCACAF Gold Cup with four goals and was named in the best XI of the tournament as Canada won the competition for the first time. Corazzin played in all of Canada's three games at the 2001 FIFA Confederations Cup. Corazzin earned 59 caps for Canada from 1994 to 2004 scoring 11 goals, ranking him tied-seventh in the all-time scoring for Canada. He has represented Canada in 23 FIFA World Cup qualification matches in three FIFA World Cup qualification campaigns (1998, 2002 and 2006) .

His final international cap was an October 2004 World Cup qualification match against Costa Rica, a game which also marked the end of the international careers of Mark Watson and Jason de Vos.

== Broadcasting career ==
In 2012, Corazzin became a soccer analyst on the pre- and post-match shows of Vancouver Whitecaps FC radio broadcasts on The TEAM 1040 in Vancouver.

== Personal life ==
Corazzin is of Italian descent.

== Career statistics ==
Scores and results list Canada's goal tally first, score column indicates score after each Corazzin goal.

List of international goals scored by Carlo Corazzin
No.	Date	Venue	Opponent	Score	Result	Competition
1	10 January 1996	Edison International Field, Anaheim, United States	Honduras	1–0	3–1	1996 CONCACAF Gold Cup
2	30 August 1996	Commonwealth Stadium, Edmonton, Canada	Panama	3–1	3–1	1998 FIFA World Cup qualification
3	12 October 1997	Commonwealth Stadium, Edmonton, Canada	Mexico	2–1	2–2	1998 FIFA World Cup qualification
4	8 October 1999	Los Angeles Memorial Coliseum, Los Angeles, United States	El Salvador	1–0	2–1	2000 CONCACAF Gold Cup qualification play off
5	10 October 1999	Los Angeles Memorial Coliseum, Los Angeles, United States	Haiti	1–0	2–1	2000 CONCACAF Gold Cup qualification play off
6	10 October 1999	Los Angeles Memorial Coliseum, Los Angeles, United States	Haiti	2–0	2–1	2000 CONCACAF Gold Cup qualification play off
7	13 February 2000	Qualcomm Stadium, San Diego, United States	Costa Rica	1–1	2–2	2000 CONCACAF Gold Cup
8	13 February 2000	Qualcomm Stadium, San Diego, United States	Costa Rica	2–2	2–2	2000 CONCACAF Gold Cup
9	20 February 2000	Qualcomm Stadium, San Diego, United States	Mexico	1–1	2–1	2000 CONCACAF Gold Cup
10	27 February 2000	Los Angeles Memorial Coliseum, Los Angeles, United States	Colombia	2–0	2–0	2000 CONCACAF Gold Cup
11	18 January 2004	Bridgetown, Barbados	Barbados	1–0	1–0	Friendly

== Honours ==
=== As a player ===
Plymouth Argyle

- Football League Third Division play-offs: 1996

Northampton Town

- Football League Third Division third-place promotion: 1999–2000

Canada

- CONCACAF Gold Cup: 2000

Individual

- CONCACAF Gold Cup Best XI: 2000
- CONCACAF Gold Cup Golden Boot: 2000
