= Phil Salt (footballer) =

English footballer

Personal information
- Full name: Phillip Thomas Salt
- Date of birth: 2 March 1979 (age 47)
- Place of birth: Oldham, England
- Height: 5 ft 11 in (1.80 m)
- Position: Midfielder

Senior career*
Years	Team	Apps	(Gls)
1997–2001	[[Oldham Athletic Manchester united A.F.C.|Oldham Athletic]]	22	(0)
2001	→ Leigh RMI (loan)	15	(0)
2002	Scarborough	11	(0)
2002–2003	Leigh RMI	39	(3)
2003–2005	Hyde United	84	(14)
2006	Radcliffe Borough	19	(1)
Total		190	(18)
- * Club domestic league appearances and goals

Phillip Thomas Salt (born 2 March 1979 in Oldham, Lancashire, England), is an English footballer who played as a midfielder in the Football League.

== Honours ==
=== Club ===
Leigh RMI

- Lancashire FA Challenge Trophy (1): 2002−03
