= David Miskelly =

Northern Irish footballer

Personal information
- Full name: David Thomas Miskelly
- Date of birth: 3 September 1979 (age 47)
- Place of birth: Newtownards, Northern Ireland, UK
- Position: Goalkeeper

Senior career*
Years	Team	Apps	(Gls)
1997–2004	Oldham Athletic	20	(0)
2004	→ Macclesfield Town	7	(0)
2004–2018	Portadown	414	(0)
Total		441	(0)

International career
	Northern Ireland U21	11	(0)

Managerial career
- 2016–2018: Warrenpoint Town (Assistant Manager)
- 2018–2022: Portadown (Assistant Manager)
- 2022-2023: Ards (Assistant manager)
- * Club domestic league appearances and goals

David Thomas Miskelly (born 3 September 1979) is a Northern Irish retired professional footballer and coach. Miskelly spent the majority of his playing career in Northern Ireland with Portadown making 441 league appearances across his career.

Miskelly officially retired in 2016 following a shoulder injury, but made a one off appearance for Portadown against Loughgall in 2018.

'Skells' worked alongside former teammate Matthew Tipton as assistant manager at Warrenpoint Town, Portadown and Ards.
