= Mark Hotte =

English footballer

Personal information
- Full name: Mark Stephen Hotte
- Date of birth: 27 September 1978 (age 48)
- Place of birth: Bradford, England
- Position: Defender

Team information
- Current team: Ossett Town

Senior career*
Years	Team	Apps	(Gls)
1997–2002	Oldham Athletic	65	(0)
2002–2005	Scarborough	123	(3)
2005–2006	York City	19	(0)
2006–2007	Scarborough	42	(0)
2007	Droylsden	3	(0)
2007	Vauxhall Motors	9	(0)
2007	Farsley Celtic	2	(0)
2008;	Bradford Park Avenue	1	(0)
2009	FC Halifax Town		
2010–	Ossett Town		
- * Club domestic league appearances and goals as of 18:47, 9 March 2008 (UTC)

Mark Stephen Hotte (born 27 September 1978 in Bradford, England) is an English football player, who plays for Ossett Town.

== Career ==
He joined Scarborough from Oldham Athletic in the 2001–02 season. In the 2003–04 season Mark was voted Scarborough's player of the season. He signed a new deal with Scarborough in June 2003. Has been seen in goal in recent years, but is generally still seen as a solid centre back. In the 2005–06 he played for York City, but the following year he returned to Scarborough under new manager Mark Patterson. Hotte joined Droylsden on 25 June 2007. Vauxhall Motors signed him in September to bolster their defence. A month later, he joined Farsley Celtic. He signed for Northern Premier League Division One North side Bradford Park Avenue in March 2008.

In August 2010 he signed for Ossett Town.
