= Andy Holt (footballer, born 1978) =

English footballer

Personal information
- Full name: Andrew Holt
- Date of birth: 21 April 1978 (age 48)
- Place of birth: Stockport, England
- Height: 6 ft 1 in (1.85 m)
- Position: Defender

Youth career
- 1993–1995: Oldham Athletic

Senior career*
Years	Team	Apps	(Gls)
1995–2001	Oldham Athletic	114	(10)
2001	→ Hull City (loan)	12	(2)
2001–2004	Hull City	61	(1)
2002	→ Barnsley (loan)	7	(0)
2003	→ Shrewsbury Town (loan)	9	(0)
2004–2006	Wrexham	81	(9)
2006–2012	Northampton Town	191	(16)
2012	Corby Town	0	(0)
Total		475	(38)
- * Club domestic league appearances and goals

Andrew Holt (born 21 April 1978) is an English former professional footballer who played as a defender.

== Career ==
=== Oldham Athletic ===
Holt started his career at Oldham Athletic where he stayed for six years, playing 114 times and scoring 10 goals. Holt sufficiently impressed Hull City during a loan spell, who paid £150,000 to secure his services. He came up through the club's centre of excellence.

=== Hull City and Wrexham ===
His career at Hull City was quite good to start; he played 30 times in his first season. However, the following year, he found himself surplus to requirements, first loaned out to Barnsley and then Shrewsbury Town. In the 2003–04 season, only starting six of his 25 games that season. He found himself moving to Wrexham on a free transfer. At Wrexham, he played 86 matches, scoring on 10 occasions. He took part in the club's Football League Trophy win in 2005. At the end of his two-year contract, he got offered a deal by League One side Northampton Town, allowing him to prove himself in the next league up.

=== Northampton ===
In his first season at Northampton, having been snapped up on a Bosman transfer by manager John Gorman, able to play in many positions he was used as a utility man, he played 37 games, none of them from the bench as had been his career's main problem, and scored twice. He was retained by the club at the end of the 2006–07 season. However at the end of the 2009/2010 season, Holt turned down a new 2-year deal with Northampton. But on 9 June, Holt signed a new 2-year deal with Northampton, a month after turning down the previous offer.

=== Corby Town ===
In July 2012, following his release from Northampton, Holt rejoined former Northampton Town manager Ian Sampson at local Conference North side, Corby Town. However, in August 2012 Holt was forced to retire from football having suffered a knee injury.

== Post-playing career ==
After retirement he moved back to Manchester.

== Honours ==
Wrexham

- Football League Trophy: 2004–05
