= Shaun Garnett =

English footballer

Personal information
- Full name: Shaun Maurice Garnett
- Date of birth: 22 November 1969 (age 56)
- Place of birth: Wallasey, England
- Height: 6 ft 2 in (1.88 m)
- Position: Defender

Team information
- Current team: Tranmere Rovers (coach)

Youth career
- 1986–1988: Tranmere Rovers

Senior career*
Years	Team	Apps	(Gls)
1988–1996	Tranmere Rovers	112	(5)
1992	→ Chester City (loan)	9	(0)
1992–1993	→ Preston North End (loan)	10	(2)
1993	→ Wigan Athletic (loan)	13	(1)
1996	Swansea City	15	(0)
1996–2002	Oldham Athletic	173	(9)
2002–2003	Halifax Town	40	(1)
2003–2004	Morecambe	12	(0)
2004–?	Harrogate Town		
- * Club domestic league appearances and goals

Shaun Garnett (born 22 November 1969) is an English former professional footballer who played as a defender. He played in The Football League for six clubs and is now a coach at Tranmere Rovers.

== Playing career ==
Garnett began his career as an apprentice with Tranmere Rovers, where he made his Football League debut during the 1987–88 season. He turned professional in June 1988 and went on to make more than 100 Football League appearances for the club, during a period that saw Rovers climb from the fourth to the second tier of English professional football, with Garnett making three appearances at Wembley Stadium for Rovers between May 1990 and May 1991.

Garnett spent most of the 1992–93 season out on loan, completely an unwanted hat-trick of being involved in three relegations from the same division during the same season, at Football League Second Division sides Chester City (where he was the final debutant in Harry McNally's seven-year spell in charge), Preston North End and Wigan Athletic. He remained at Tranmere until March 1996, when he joined Swansea City for £200,000 but six months later he returned to north-west England with Oldham Athletic for £150,000.

Garnett spent six years in the Oldham first-team before joining Nationwide Conference side Halifax Town for 2002–03, in a loan move that became permanent. The following season he moved to Morecambe, in another loan deal that was made permanent. He was released at the end of the 2003–04 season and joined Harrogate Town as player-coach. He has since returned to Tranmere as part of the coaching staff at Prenton Park.

== Honours ==
Tranmere Rovers

- Football League Third Division play-offs: 1991
- Associate Members' Cup: 1989–90
