= Richard Graham (footballer, born 1974) =

English footballer

Personal information
- Full name: Richard Ean Graham
- Date of birth: 28 November 1974 (age 51)
- Place of birth: Dewsbury, England
- Position: Central defender

Senior career*
Years	Team	Apps	(Gls)
1993–2000	Oldham Athletic	163	(15)
- * Club domestic league appearances and goals

Richard Graham (born 28 November 1974 in Dewsbury, West Yorkshire) is an English former football defender. The centre back joined Oldham Athletic as a trainee and went on to make over 160 league and cup appearances for the club.
