= Gary Kelly (footballer, born 1966) =

English footballer (born 1966)

Personal information
- Full name: Gary Alexander Kelly
- Date of birth: 3 August 1966 (age 60)
- Place of birth: Fulwood, Lancashire, England
- Height: 5 ft 10 in (1.78 m)
- Position: Goalkeeper

Senior career*
Years	Team	Apps	(Gls)
1984–1989	Newcastle United	53	(0)
1988	→ Blackpool (loan)	5	(0)
1989–1996	Bury	236	(0)
1994	→ West Ham United (loan)	0	(0)
1996–2003	Oldham Athletic	225	(0)
2003	Northwich Victoria	7	(0)
2003	Sheffield United	1	(0)
2003–2004	Leigh RMI	14	(0)
Total		542	(0)

International career
1982–1985	Republic of Ireland U19	19	(0)
1985–1989	Republic of Ireland U21	8	(0)
1989	Republic of Ireland U23	1	(0)
1990	Republic of Ireland B	1	(0)
- * Club domestic league appearances and goals

Gary Alexander Kelly (born 3 August 1966) is a former professional footballer who played as a goalkeeper. Born in England, he represented the Republic of Ireland internationally as the son of former Republic of Ireland goalkeeper Alan Kelly Sr.

== Early career ==
Kelly was born in Fulwood, Lancashire. Kelly began his career as an apprentice with Arthur Cox's Newcastle United in 1982, becoming boot boy to former England captain and European Footballer of the Year Kevin Keegan. Kelly signed a professional deal in 1984 as Jack Charlton took over as manager. Kelly went on to win the FA Youth Cup in 1985, beating Watford 4–1 on aggregate.

== Club career ==
=== Newcastle United ===
In 1986, he made his senior debut in a 1–0 win against Wimbledon at St James' Park. Later, Kelly would win the club's Young Player of the Year Award that season.

Kelly made over 50 league appearances for the Magpies which included saving two penalties in one game against Chelsea. He saved a penalty against Liverpool at Wembley in the Football League Centenary Finals in 1988. In October 1988, he went on loan to Blackpool for a month, as stand-in for Barry Siddall.

=== Bury ===
In 1989, manager Jim Smith sold Kelly to Bury, with whom he spent the next seven years. He made 236 league appearances for the Gigg Lane club. The following year, he reached the Division 2 play-offs losing 2–0 on aggregate to Tranmere Rovers in the semi-final and losing 2–1 on aggregate to Bolton Wanderers in the semi-final in 1991. Kelly was also voted Bury FC Player of the Year in 1992. In 1993, Bury reached the third division play-offs losing 1–0 on aggregate to York City in the semi-final. He was loaned out to West Ham United in 1994, reaching the quarter-final of the FA Cup before losing 3–2 to Luton Town in a replay and being an unused sub in 16 Premiership games. He also played in the Bobby Moore Testimonial in a 2–1 win over a Premiership select XI at Upton Park.

In 1995, Kelly would play in the third division play-off final after beating Preston North End 2–0 on aggregate in the semi-final, before losing 2–0 to Chesterfield in the final at Wembley Stadium. Kelly was voted into the PFA Team of the Year by his fellow professionals in 1995 after keeping 23 clean sheets that season. He also achieved promotion to League 1 with Bury in 1996.

=== Oldham Athletic ===
Oldham Athletic manager, Graeme Sharp, came in for Kelly's services in 1996, and he went on to make 225 league appearances over seven years for the Latics. Kelly swept the boards in the club's Player of the Year awards in 1997.

=== Later career ===
Kelly joined Neil Warnock's Sheffield United in 2003 reaching the semi-finals of the FA Cup before losing 1–0 to Arsenal at Old Trafford. He also reached the 2003 Football League First Division play-off final eventually losing to 3–0 to Wolverhampton Wanderers at the Millennium Stadium, Cardiff.

Kelly later signed for Conference National clubs Northwich Victoria and Leigh RMI where he was player assistant manager.

== International career ==
Kelly played for the Ireland U19 national team that qualified for the 1983 UEFA European Under-18 Football Championships where despite remaining unbeaten in a group that included eventual winners, France, they were eliminated. Kelly also played in the 1984 UEFA European Under-18 Championship in Russia. Ireland won their group stage before losing the semifinal 2–1 against hosts Russia in front of a 40,000 crowd in Dynamo Stadium, Moscow. Ireland lost the third place playoff 2–1 to Poland in front of a 60,000 crowd at the Lenin Stadium, Moscow. Kelly was voted goalkeeper of the tournament by legendary Russian goalkeeper Lev Yashin.

Ireland's exploits earned them a qualification for the 1985 FIFA World Youth Championships in Russia and a first UEFA medal but Kelly was refused permission to be released by his club Newcastle United. Kelly played in the first three games of the 1986 UEFA European Under-18 Football Championship qualification campaign, as Ireland topped the group before new UEFA age restrictions ruled him out of the remaining tournament.

Kelly made his Ireland U-21 debut in a friendly in 1985 against England at Fratton Park and played in the 1988 UEFA European Under-21 Football Championship qualifiers. He also played in the Toulon Tournament in 1989 not conceding in any of his three games including saving a penalty against hosts France B in a 1–0 playoff win.

Kelly played at Ireland Under 23 level for Ireland in a 3–0 win over Northern Ireland in 1989. He was also selected for Ireland at 'B' level on several occasions, playing in a 4–1 win over England in 1990 at Turners Cross, Cork in front of a 10,000 crowd. This remains England's heaviest defeat at 'B' level.

Kelly was selected to represent the full squad on ten occasions, never once tasting defeat. He was on standby for the 1990 and 1994 FIFA World Cup Finals as Jack Charlton went with an extra outfield player instead of the regulation three goalkeepers in his 22-man squad. His last selection was for the Euro 2000 Championship Play Off 2nd leg against Turkey in Bursa in which Republic of Ireland drew 0–0. He was called up to provide cover for Dean Kiely, after his brother was injured in the first leg.

== Personal life ==
His father, Alan Kelly Sr. and brother, Alan Kelly Jr., were also goalkeepers who played for the Republic of Ireland at the fully international level.

Kelly played Masters Football for Newcastle United winning the Northern Masters in 2003 and 2007 where he was voted player of the tournament. He was also runner up in the Dubai Masters in 2006 losing 1–0 to Liverpool in the final. Kelly achieved his UEFA 'A' Coaching License and UEFA Goalkeeping License in 2007.

== Honours ==
Individual

- PFA Team of the Year: 1994–95 Third Division
