= Lee Duxbury =

English footballer (born 1969)

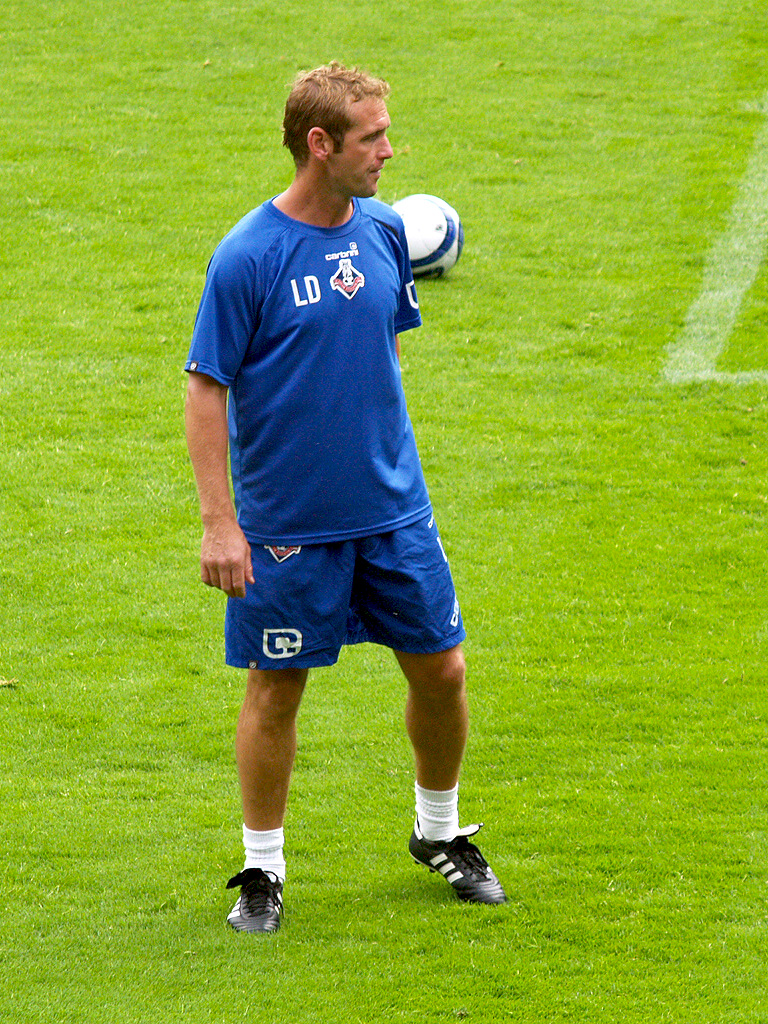
- Duxbury in 2009

Personal information
- Date of birth: 7 October 1969 (age 57)
- Place of birth: Skipton, England
- Height: 5 ft 10 in (1.78 m)
- Position: Midfielder

Youth career
- 1985–1988: Bradford City

Senior career*
Years	Team	Apps	(Gls)
1988–1994	Bradford City	209	(25)
1990–1991	→ Rochdale	10	(0)
1994–1995	Huddersfield Town	29	(2)
1995–1997	Bradford City	63	(7)
1997–2003	Oldham Athletic	248	(32)
2003–2004	Bury	37	(0)
2004	Harrogate Town		
2004–2006	Farsley Celtic		
2006	Glenavon		
Total		596	(66)

Managerial career
- Eccleshill United
- * Club domestic league appearances and goals

Lee Duxbury (born 7 October 1969) is an English former professional footballer who played as a midfielder. He was previously manager of non-league Eccleshill United.

== Playing career ==
Born in Skipton, Duxbury played in the Football League for Bradford City, Rochdale, Huddersfield Town, Oldham Athletic and Bury, making nearly 600 career appearances.

Duxbury signed for Harrogate Town in September 2004, for Farsley Celtic in October 2004, and for Glenavon in January 2006.

Duxbury is a survivor of 1985 Bradford City stadium fire.

== Coaching career ==
Duxbury was a coach at Oldham Athletic, before becoming manager of non-league Eccleshill United.

== Honours ==
Huddersfield Town

- Football League Second Division play-offs: 1995

Bradford City

- Football League Second Division play-offs: 1996
