= Matthew Tipton =

Welsh footballer and manager

Personal information
- Full name: Matthew John Tipton
- Date of birth: 29 June 1980 (age 46)
- Place of birth: Bangor, Wales
- Height: 5 ft 10 in (1.78 m)
- Position: Striker

Youth career
- Oldham Athletic

Senior career*
Years	Team	Apps	(Gls)
1997–2002	Oldham Athletic	112	(15)
2002–2005	Macclesfield Town	131	(40)
2005	Mansfield Town	4	(0)
2005–2007	Bury	24	(3)
2006–2007	→ Macclesfield Town (loan)	33	(5)
2007–2009	Hyde United	48	(21)
2008–2009	Droylsden	18	(1)
2009–2010	Macclesfield Town	24	(5)
2010	Dundalk	14	(7)
2011–2012	Portadown	51	(30)
2012–2014	Linfield	41	(16)
2014–2016	Ballymena United	55	(21)
2016–2018	Warrenpoint Town	2	(0)
Total		556	(164)

International career
- Wales U21

Managerial career
- 2016–2018: Warrenpoint Town
- 2018–2022: Portadown
- 2022–2023: Ards
- * Club domestic league appearances and goals

Matthew John Tipton (born 29 June 1980) is a Welsh football manager and former professional player who most recently managed NIFL Championship side Ards.

== Club career ==
Tipton started his career at Oldham Athletic moving up through the Youth ranks and making his debut aged just 17. In 2002, he moved on to League Two side Macclesfield Town, where he enjoyed his most prolific spell.

This was followed by a brief, unhappy spell with Mansfield Town, before moving back to the North-West of England with Bury.

After his time at Bury came to an end he dropped out of the Football League and joined Conference North side Hyde United. A season later moved to local rivals Droylsden. He scored the only goal of the game in Droylsden's 1–0 giant-killing victory over league side Darlington. On 18 July 2009 he returned to Macclesfield Town as trialist and played in the 3–0 pre-season defeat to Middlesbrough. He signed a one-year deal with Macclesfield on 24 July 2009.

He left the club, along with 10 other players at the end of the 2009–10 season.

He signed for Dundalk of The League of Ireland on 29 July 2010. It was the first time in his career that he had played outside of Britain. He signed for the 2010 campaign, and made his league debut in the defeat at Sligo Rovers. On 13 September 2010 Tipton scored a hat trick helping Dundalk win 5–1 against league toppers Shamrock Rovers .

In December 2010 he signed for Portadown on an 18-month deal with the option for another 12 months. He was the club's leading scorer for the 2011–12 season with 27 goals.

He signed for Linfield in May 2012 on a two-year contract, and in 2014 joined Ballymena United. He scored 19 goals for the Sky Blues in his debut season. On 24 March 2016, Tipton, having had trouble recovering from a knee injury, left Ballymena. Upon leaving the club, he stated that he was keen to explore alternative options in football.

== International career ==
Tipton is a former Wales under-21 international player.

== Management career ==
Tipton went into management in 2016, taking the reins from long-serving Warrenpoint Town manager Barry Gray, who had managed the club from the Mid-Ulster Football League into the NIFL Premiership, but had been relegated to the NIFL Championship by the time he stood down. In his first season, Tipton's side claimed the Championship and the Mid-Ulster Cup.

Tipton resigned the Warrenpoint manager's post on 28 February 2018, and later that day was announced as the new manager of Portadown on a two-and-a-half-year contract.

== Honours ==
=== As a player ===
Droylsden

- Manchester Premier Cup: 2008-09

Linfield

- County Antrim Shield: 2013-14

Ballymena United

- County Antrim Shield: 2015-16

=== As a manager ===
Warrenpoint Town

- NIFL Championship: 2016-17
- Mid-Ulster Cup: 2016-17

Portadown F.C.

- NIFL Championship: 2019-20
