= Paul Rickers =

English footballer (born 1975)

Personal information
- Full name: Paul Steven Rickers
- Date of birth: 9 May 1975 (age 51)
- Place of birth: Pontefract, England
- Height: 5 ft 10 in (1.78 m)
- Position: Midfielder

Senior career*
Years	Team	Apps	(Gls)
1993–2002	Oldham Athletic	263	(20)
2002–2004	Northampton Town	11	(0)
2003–2004	→ Leigh RMI (loan)	3	(0)
2004–2006	Farsley Celtic	15	(2)
2006	Ossett Town	6	(0)
2006	Frickley Athletic		
2006–2007	Goole		
2007–2008	Guiseley		
Total		298	(22)
- * Club domestic league appearances and goals

Paul Steven Rickers (born 9 May 1975) is an English retired professional footballer who played as a midfielder for Oldham Athletic and Northampton Town in the Football League.
