= 2003–04 Bury F.C. season =

Bury
2003–04 season
- Manager: Graham Barrow
- Football League Third Division: 12th
- FA Cup: First round
- League Cup: First round
- League Trophy: Quarter final

The 2003–04 season saw Bury compete in the Football League Third Division where they finished in 12th position with 56 points.

== Final league table ==
Pos	Team	Pld	W	D	L	GF	GA	GD	Pts
10	Swansea City	46	15	14	17	58	61	−3	59
11	Boston United	46	16	11	19	50	54	−4	59
12	Bury	46	15	11	20	54	64	−10	56
13	Cambridge United	46	14	14	18	55	67	−12	56
14	Cheltenham Town	46	14	14	18	57	71	−14	56

Rules for classification: In the Football League goals scored (GF) takes precedence over goal difference (GD).

== Results ==
=== Legend ===
Win	Draw	Loss

=== Football League Third Division ===
Match	Date	Opponent	Venue	Result	Attendance	Scorers
1	9 August 2003	Swansea City	A	2 – 4	8,826	Preece 20', Connell 85'
2	16 August 2003	Scunthorpe United	H	2 – 3	2,716	Porter 45', Preece 76'
3	23 August 2003	Kidderminster Harriers	A	2 – 0	2,548	Porter 28', Seddon 88'
4	25 August 2003	Lincoln City	H	2 – 1	2,576	Unsworth 81', Preece 90'
5	30 August 2003	Southend United	A	0 – 1	3,172	
6	6 September 2003	Huddersfield Town	H	2 – 1	4,591	Swailes 24', Connell 83'
7	13 September 2003	Cheltenham Town	H	1 – 1	2,753	Preece 35'
8	16 September 2003	Mansfield Town	A	3 – 5	4,145	Connell (2) 21', 78', Seddon 58'
9	20 September 2003	Boston United	A	0 – 1	2,260	
10	27 September 2003	Doncaster Rovers	H	1 – 3	3,606	Preece 28'
11	30 September 2003	York City	H	2 – 0	2,202	Porter 37', O'Neill 71'
12	4 October 2003	Torquay United	A	1 – 3	2,732	Porter 38'
13	11 October 2003	Cambridge United	A	2 – 1	5,106	Connell 32', Porter 39'
14	18 October 2003	Oxford United	H	0 – 4	2,930	
15	21 October 2003	Hull City	H	0 – 0	3,869	
16	25 October 2003	Darlington	A	3 – 1	3,516	Seddon 35', Connell 56', Singh 82'
17	1 November 2003	Yeovil Town	H	2 – 1	3,086	O'Shaughnessy 35', Unsworth 88'
18	15 November 2003	Bristol Rovers	A	2 – 1	7,019	Barrett (o.g.) 70', O'Neill 90'
19	22 November 2003	Northampton Town	H	1 – 0	2,683	O'Neill 72'
20	29 November 2003	Macclesfield Town	A	0 – 1	2,312	
21	6 December 2003	Hull City	A	0 – 2	11,308	
22	13 December 2003	Rochdale	H	1 – 2	3,646	Dunfield 49'
23	20 December 2003	Leyton Orient	A	0 – 2	3,475	
24	26 December 2003	Carlisle United	H	1 – 3	3,345	Porter 30'
25	28 December 2003	Huddersfield Town	A	0 – 1	10,217	
26	3 January 2004	Lincoln City	A	1 – 2	3,870	Porter 90'
27	10 January 2004	Swansea City	H	2 – 0	2,799	Swailes 62', Daly 86'
28	17 January 2004	Scunthorpe United	A	0 – 0	3,869	
29	24 January 2004	Kidderminster Harriers	H	0 – 0	2,526	
30	7 February 2004	Carlisle United	A	1 – 2	4,954	Seddon 25'
31	14 February 2004	Cambridge United	H	1 – 0	2,322	Seddon 2'
32	21 February 2004	Oxford United	A	1 – 1	6,476	Dunfield 47'
33	24 February 2004	Southend United	H	1 – 1	1,670	Seddon 90'
34	28 February 2004	Darlington	H	1 – 1	2,766	Barrass 57'
35	6 March 2004	Leyton Orient	H	1 – 1	2,355	Seddon 63'
36	13 March 2004	Rochdale	A	0 – 0	4,225	
37	16 March 2004	Mansfield Town	H	3 – 0	2,119	Seddon (2) 26', 60', Swailes 43'
38	20 March 2004	Cheltenham Town	A	2 – 1	3,435	Swailes 74', Porter 82'
39	27 March 2004	Boston United	H	1 – 3	2,693	Swailes 13'
40	3 April 2004	Doncaster Rovers	A	1 – 3	6,221	Singh 88'
41	9 April 2004	Torquay United	H	2 – 1	2,770	Seddon 35', Nugent 67'
42	13 April 2004	York City	A	1 – 1	3,111	Seddon 16'
43	17 April 2004	Yeovil Town	A	1 – 2	5,172	Nugent 35'
44	24 April 2004	Bristol Rovers	H	0 – 0	2,683	
45	1 May 2004	Northampton Town	A	2 – 3	6,179	Cartledge 10', Nugent 45'
46	8 May 2004	Macclesfield Town	H	2 – 0	3,569	Porter 85', Whaley 90'

=== FA Cup ===
Round	Date	Opponent	Venue	Result	Attendance	Scorers
R1	8 November 2003	Rochdale	H	1 – 2	5,464	Porter 71'

=== League Cup ===
Round	Date	Opponent	Venue	Result	Attendance	Scorers
R1	12 August 2003	Tranmere Rovers	A	0 – 1	4,272	

=== League Trophy ===
Round	Date	Opponent	Venue	Result	Attendance	Scorers
R2	3 November 2003	Oldham Athletic	H	2 – 1	3,102	Preece 6', Thompson 78'
QF	9 December 2003	Scunthorpe United	H	0 – 1	1,246	

== Squad statistics ==
No.	Pos.	Name	League		FA Cup		League Cup		League Trophy		Total	
No.	Pos.	Name	Apps	Goals	Apps	Goals	Apps	Goals	Apps	Goals	Apps	Goals
1	GK	(Wales) Glyn Garner	46	0	1	0	1	0	2	0	50	0
2	DF	(England) Matt Barrass	19(3)	1	0	0	0	0	1	0	20(3)	1
3	DF	(England) Colin Woodthorpe	39	0	1	0	1	0	2	0	43	0
4	DF	(England) Danny Swailes	42	5	0	0	1	0	2	0	45	5
5	MF	(England) Lee Duxbury	36(1)	0	1	0	1	0	0	0	38(1)	0
6	DF	(England) Lee Unsworth	27(2)	1	1	0	1	0	2	0	31(2)	1
7	FW	(England) George Clegg	4(2)	0	0	0	1	0	1	0	6(2)	0
9	FW	(England) David Nugent	20(6)	3	1	0	1	0	0(1)	0	22(7)	3
10	FW	(England) Joe O'Neill	10(13)	3	0(1)	0	0(1)	0	1(1)	0	11(16)	3
11	MF	(England) David Flitcroft	17	0	0	0	0	0	0	0	17	0
11	FW	(England) Andy Preece	10(4)	5	1	0	0(1)	0	2	1	13(5)	6
12	FW	(England) Chris Porter	19(18)	9	0(1)	1	1	0	1	0	21(19)	10
14	MF	(England) Paul O'Shaughnessy	21(6)	1	1	0	0	0	0	0	21(6)	1
15	MF	(England) Steve Gunby	1(4)	0	0	0	0	0	0(1)	0	1(5)	0
16	MF	(England) Simon Whaley	3(7)	1	0	0	0	0	0(1)	0	3(8)	1
17	MF	(Canada) Terry Dunfield	28(2)	0	0	0	0	0	2	0	30(2)	0
18	DF	(England) Tom Kennedy	22(5)	0	0	0	0	0	1	0	23(5)	0
19	FW	(England) Gareth Seddon	28(12)	11	0	0	0(1)	0	0	0	29(13)	11
21	MF	(England) Lee Connell	23(5)	6	1	0	1	0	2	0	27(5)	6
21	MF	(England) Harpal Singh	20(8)	2	1	0	1	0	0	0	22(8)	2
23	DF	(England) Greg Strong	10	0	0	0	1	0	0	0	11	0
23	DF	(Canada) Justin Thompson	1	0	0	0	0	0	2	1	3	1
24	MF	(Republic of Ireland) Glenn Whelan	13	0	0	0	1	0	1	0	15	0
24	MF	(England) Phil Charnock	3	0	0	0	0	0	0	0	3	0
25	MF	(England) Ben Thornley	5	0	0	0	0	0	0	0	5	0
26	DF	(England) John Cartledge	7(4)	1	0	0	0	0	0	0	7(4)	1
27	DF	(England) Phil Gulliver	10	0	0	0	1	0	0	0	11	0
28	DF	(England) David Buchanan	0	0	0	0	0	0	0	0	0	0
29	FW	(Republic of Ireland) Jon Daly	7	1	0	0	0	0	0	0	7	1
30	DF	(England) Dave Challinor	15	0	0	0	0	0	0	0	15	0
