= List of Oldham Athletic A.F.C. managers =

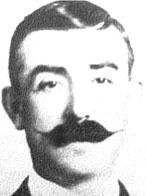
David Ashworth, Oldham's first manager

The following is a list of managers of Oldham Athletic A.F.C. and all honours won by the club since 1906. Up to September 2022, the club has had 47 different managers, and has not won any major competitions in its history.

Joe Royle is the longest serving in Oldham's history, managing 608 games. Royle was manager of the club between 1982 and 1994 in which time he led the club to promotion from the Football League Second Division to the First Division while accumulating 225 total competitive wins—the most by any manager in Oldham's history. He also led the club to two semi-final appearances in the FA Cup and a runners up spot in the 1989–90 Football League Cup as his side lost 1–0 to Nottingham Forest. On 15 March 2009, Royle returned to the club as manager following John Sheridan's departure from the club, before leaving the club a second time at the end of the season.

Jimmy Frizzell is the second longest serving manager in the club's history, holding the position from 1970 until 1982 (544 games). Both he and Royle are the only managers in Oldham's history with over 500 games and 200 or more competitive victories. Sheridan has had the most spells (six) as Oldham manager, totalling 240 games, and is one of six to manage over 200 first team games.

== History ==
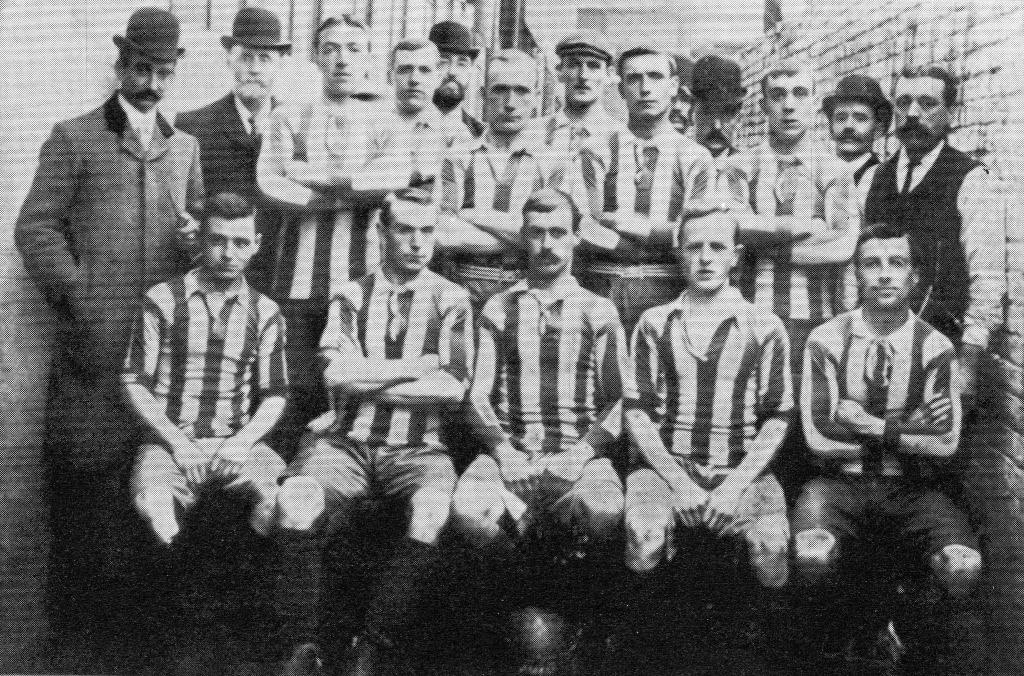
Oldham Athletic in 1905 with David Ashworth (far left)

In 1906, Oldham Athletic appointed their first manager in club history as David Ashworth came to the club. In his first season, Ashworth led the club to a third-place finish in the Lancashire Combination Second Division, gaining promotion to the First Division. Two years later, Ashworth once again led the club to victory as it finished in first place in the 1906–07 season, the final season of the Lancashire Combination. After the league disbanded, Oldham Athletic joined the Football League in the Second Division as they finished in third place their first season. In the following season, David Ashworth won his second trophy at Oldham Athletic as the club won the Lancashire Senior Cup—a local tournament for clubs in and around Lancashire. In 1909–10, Ashworth led the club to another promotion as they reached the Football League First Division. After several top-half finishes, Ashworth left the club to manage at Stockport County.

In 1914–15, Herbert Bamlett became Oldham Athletic's second manager and found success with the club in his first season. Oldham finished in second place in the First Division, as well as reaching the quarter-finals of the FA Cup. As competitive football returned to England following the end of the First World War, Bamlett returned as manager. Many of Oldham's original players were killed during the war or retired from football as the club found little success. Charle Roberts took over the club for the 1921–22 season, though only served as manager for one season.

David Ashworth returned to Oldham after having served at both Stockport County and Liverpool, though also struggled as Oldham were relegated back to the Second Division. For the next 11 seasons, Oldham failed to reach the First Division again as the club averaged a mid-table finish under managers Robert Mellor, Andrew Wilson, and Jimmy McMullan. During 1934–35, Robert Mellor—in his second stint with the club since leaving in 1927—returned to the club as Oldham were relegated once more, finishing in twenty-second, and placed in Football League Third Division North. Oldham and Mellor found relative success in Third Division North, but never gained promotion back to the Second Division before the Second World War once again interrupted football in England.

After the return of competitive football once more, Oldham failed to regain promotion under Frank Womack and Billy Wootton. George Hardwick became manager in 1950–51 and led the club to promotion in 1952–53 by winning the league, but were relegated once more as they finished in last place the following season. After little success following the promotion, Oldham went through two managers during the 1950s including Ted Goodier and Norman Dodgin. In 1958–59, Oldham became part of Football League Fourth Division as Division Third North and South disbanded for separate divisions.

In the early 1960s, both manager Jack Rowley and owner Ken Bates entered Oldham Athletic. With Bates's money, Oldham Athletic's fortunes turned for the better as the club once again reached Football League Third Division with the club finishing in second place, though Rowley left the club in April of the same year. The club finished with mid-table results under managers Les McDowall, Gordon Hurst, and Jimmy McIlroy—with McIlroy winning the only trophy, by way the Lancashire Senior Cup. Rowley returned midway through the 1968–69 season as the club was relegated back to Division Four. Midway through the 1969–70 season, both Rowley and owner Ken Bates exited the club as Jimmy Frizzell became manager.

Jimmy Frizzell, a Scottish-born defender, was appointed as Oldham's player-manager during the 1969–70 season. In the 1970–71 season, Oldham earned their best finish since 1962–63, finishing in third and gaining promotion back into the Third Division. After a midtable result in their first season, the club missed out on promotion—finishing in fourth place, seven points behind league champions Bolton Wanderers. In the 1973–74 season, the club finished in first place and returned to the Second Division for the first time in 21 years. Oldham's trip back to the Second Division was more successful than their previous appearance. During Frizzell's remaining time at the club, the club remained in Division Two and little FA Cup and Football League Cup success.

During the mid-1980s, the club ushered in a new era under manager Joe Royle—who became one of the most successful in Oldham's history. Royle and Oldham reached Wembley Stadium in the 1990 Football League Cup Final as the club lost 1–0 in the final. The next season, Royle led the club to the First Division for the first time in 68 years. In their first season back in the top flight, the club finished in 17th and became one of the founding members of the newly formed Premier League. Though after two more seasons at the top level, Oldham faced relegation yet again and during the following season, the Joe Royle era at Oldham Athletic came to an end, as he left the club for Everton.

In the mid-1990s, Oldham began to falter as they were relegated back to the Second Division under manager Neil Warnock following two lower-half finishes under Graeme Sharp. Warnock departed by mutual consent in May 1998 and was replaced by his former assistant and fans' favourite Andy Ritchie.

In 2001, Oldham Athletic was purchased by Oxford-based businessman Chris Moore who sacked Ritchie as part of a restructuring of the club's coaching set-up. Mick Wadsworth was appointed to replace Ritchie. However, Wadsworth lasted only 18 months before being replaced by Iain Dowie. Moore pulled out of the club in the summer of 2003, followed by Dowie in December of that year. Following a brief period when David Eyres and John Sheridan acted as joint caretaker managers, Brian Talbot was appointed as manager by new owners Simon Blitz, Simon Corney and Danny Gazal. Ronnie Moore replaced Talbot in March 2005 and managed Oldham until June 2006, winning another Lancashire Senior Cup for the club in the process.

On 1 June 2006, Sheridan again became Oldham's manager. His first season was relatively successful as the club reached the League One play-offs, though lost 5–2 to Blackpool on aggregate. On 15 March 2009, Sheridan left Oldham, and was immediately replaced by former manager Joe Royle. However, in late April 2009, Royle rejected an offer to extend his stay as manager, before ultimately being replaced by Darlington boss Dave Penney on 30 April. Penney parted company with Oldham on 6 May 2010 with the club 16th in League One. Penney was succeeded for the final game of the 2009–10 season by his assistant Martin Gray.

Paul Dickov signed a one-year contract as player/manager on 9 June 2010. Dickov retired from playing following the final game of the 2010–11 season before signing a new contract to remain at Oldham into the 2011–12 season. Dickov resigned on 3 February 2013 following a poor run of league form, despite having led Oldham to victory over Liverpool in the FA Cup 4th round. Dickov's replacement was named on 18 March 2013 as Lee Johnson who, at 31, was then the youngest manager in the English football league. He managed 103 games before joining Barnsley in February 2015 (since then, no Oldham manager has lasted more than 41 games).

From 2018 to 2022, under the troubled ownership of Abdallah Lemsagam, Oldham appointed a succession of short-lived managers. On 11 February 2019, the club announced they had appointed former Manchester United player Paul Scholes as their manager on a one-and-a-half-year contract. Scholes, who had spent his entire career at United, resigned after seven matches (one win, three draws, three defeats), following Lemsagam's attempted interference in team selection. On 22 March 2019, Pete Wild was named head coach on interim basis until the end of the season (his second spell in charge). He was followed in quick succession by Frenchman Laurent Banide, Oldham's first manager from outside the British Isles, then Dino Maamria from Tunisia and Australian Harry Kewell, the club's first non-European managers. Keith Curle occupied the role for eight months in 2021, before a nine-match caretaker spell by another Tunisian, Selim Benachour. Sheridan succeeded him for a sixth spell in charge before stepping down in September 2022 after the club had dropped into the National League, to be replaced by David Unsworth. Steve Thompson took over on an interim basis in September 2023 after Unsworth was dismissed, almost a year to the day since his appointment.

== Statistics ==
Information correct as at 13 October 2024.

| Name | Nationality | From | To | P | W | D | L | Win % | Honours | Note(s) |
|---|---|---|---|---|---|---|---|---|---|---|
| David Ashworth | Ireland | 1 August 1906 | 1 April 1914 | 283 | 126 | 67 | 90 | 44.52 | 1 Lancashire Combination title (1906–07); 1 Lancashire Senior Cup title (1907–08); 1 Football League Second Division runner-up (1909–10) | |
| Herbert Bamlett | England | 1 June 1914 | 1 May 1921 | 127 | 44 | 35 | 48 | 34.65 | | |
| Charlie Roberts | England | 1 July 1921 | 31 January 1922 | 27 | 9 | 7 | 11 | 33.33 | | |
| David Ashworth | Ireland | 1 January 1923 | 1 July 1924 | 63 | 20 | 22 | 21 | 31.75 | | |
| Robert Mellor | England | 1 July 1924 | 1 July 1927 | 132 | 52 | 26 | 54 | 39.39 | | |
| Andrew Wilson | Scotland | 1 July 1927 | 1 July 1932 | 218 | 87 | 45 | 86 | 39.91 | | |
| Jimmy McMullan | Scotland | 1 May 1933 | 1 May 1934 | 45 | 18 | 11 | 16 | 40.00 | | |
| Robert Mellor | England | 1 May 1934 | 1 February 1945 | 221 | 93 | 46 | 82 | 42.08 | | |
| Frank Womack | England | 1 February 1945 | 1 April 1947 | 38 | 14 | 7 | 17 | 36.84 | | |
| Billy Wootton | England | 1 June 1947 | 1 September 1950 | 141 | 54 | 36 | 51 | 38.28 | | |
| George Hardwick | England | 1 November 1950 | 1 May 1956 | 271 | 101 | 69 | 101 | 37.27 | 1 Football League Third Division North title (1952–53) | |
| Ted Goodier | England | 1 May 1956 | 30 June 1958 | 96 | 28 | 36 | 32 | 29.17 | | |
| Norman Dodgin | England | 1 July 1958 | 1 May 1960 | 97 | 27 | 17 | 53 | 27.84 | | |
| Jack Rowley | England | 1 June 1960 | 31 May 1963 | 151 | 66 | 33 | 52 | 43.71 | 1 Football League Fourth Division runner-up (1962–63) | |
| Les McDowall | Scotland | 1 June 1963 | 1 March 1965 | 86 | 33 | 15 | 38 | 38.37 | | |
| Gordon Hurst | England | 1 April 1965 | 1 January 1966 | 19 | 3 | 5 | 11 | 15.79 | | |
| Jimmy McIlroy | Northern Ireland | 1 January 1966 | 1 August 1968 | 121 | 46 | 26 | 49 | 38.01 | 1 Lancashire Senior Cup title (1966–67) | |
| Jack Rowley | England | 1 October 1968 | 1 December 1969 | 57 | 16 | 14 | 27 | 28.07 | | |
| Jimmy Frizzell | Scotland | 1 March 1970 | 12 June 1982 | 544 | 200 | 160 | 184 | 36.76 | 1 Football League Fourth Division promotion (1970–71); 1 Football League Third Division title (1973–74); 1 Anglo-Scottish Cup runner-up (1978–79); 1 Lancashire Senior Cup runner-up (1978–79) | |
| Joe Royle | England | 14 July 1982 | 10 November 1994 | 608 | 225 | 165 | 218 | 37.01 | 1 Football League Cup runner-up (1989–90); 1 Football League Second Division title (1990–91) | |
| Graeme Sharp | Scotland | 16 November 1994 | 11 February 1997 | 117 | 35 | 34 | 48 | 29.91 | | |
| Neil Warnock | England | 21 February 1997 | 7 April 1998 | 69 | 22 | 20 | 27 | 31.88 | | |
| Andy Ritchie | England | 7 May 1998 | 31 October 2001 | 179 | 59 | 45 | 75 | 32.96 | | |
| Billy Urmson & John Sheridan | England; Ireland | 31 October 2001 | 7 November 2001 | 1 | 0 | 1 | 0 | 0.00 | | |
| Mick Wadsworth | England | 7 November 2001 | 31 May 2002 | 35 | 15 | 9 | 11 | 42.86 | | |
| Iain Dowie | Northern Ireland | 31 May 2002 | 19 December 2003 | 82 | 31 | 28 | 23 | 37.80 | | |
| David Eyres & John Sheridan | England; Ireland | 20 December 2003 | 10 March 2004 | 12 | 2 | 6 | 4 | 16.67 | | |
| Brian Talbot | England | 10 March 2004 | 25 February 2005 | 55 | 20 | 14 | 21 | 36.36 | | |
| Tony Philliskirk | England | 25 February 2005 | 1 March 2005 | 1 | 0 | 0 | 1 | 0.00 | | |
| Ronnie Moore | England | 1 March 2005 | 1 June 2006 | 65 | 23 | 18 | 24 | 35.38 | 1 Lancashire Senior Cup title (2005–06) | |
| John Sheridan | Ireland | 1 June 2006 | 15 March 2009 | 151 | 61 | 47 | 43 | 40.39 | | |
| Joe Royle | England | 15 March 2009 | 2 May 2009 | 9 | 1 | 4 | 4 | 11.11 | | |
| Dave Penney | England | 30 April 2009 | 6 May 2010 | 48 | 13 | 13 | 22 | 27.08 | | |
| Martin Gray | England | 6 May 2010 | 2 June 2010 | 1 | 0 | 0 | 1 | 0.00 | | |
| Paul Dickov | Scotland | 9 June 2010 | 3 February 2013 | 141 | 43 | 37 | 61 | 30.50 | | |
| Tony Philliskirk | England | 4 February 2013 | 18 March 2013 | 8 | 3 | 1 | 4 | 37.50 | | |
| Lee Johnson | England | 18 March 2013 | 25 February 2015 | 103 | 36 | 32 | 35 | 34.95 | | |
| Dean Holden | England | 25 February 2015 | 6 May 2015 | 15 | 3 | 5 | 7 | 20.00 | | |
| Darren Kelly | Northern Ireland | 6 May 2015 | 12 September 2015 | 9 | 1 | 4 | 4 | 11.11 | | |
| David Dunn | England | 13 September 2015 | 12 January 2016 | 20 | 3 | 9 | 8 | 15.00 | | |
| John Sheridan | Ireland | 13 January 2016 | 27 May 2016 | 22 | 9 | 6 | 7 | 40.91 | | |
| Stephen Robinson | Northern Ireland | 9 July 2016 | 12 January 2017 | 33 | 7 | 11 | 5 | 21.21 | | |
| John Sheridan | Ireland | 12 January 2017 | 25 September 2017 | 33 | 10 | 9 | 14 | 30.33 | | |
| Richie Wellens | England | 25 September 2017 | 8 June 2018 | 40 | 12 | 16 | 12 | 30.00 | | |
| Frankie Bunn | England | 13 June 2018 | 27 December 2018 | 30 | 12 | 8 | 10 | 40.00 | | |
| Pete Wild | England | 27 December 2018 | 11 February 2019 | 8 | 4 | 1 | 3 | 50.00 | | |
| Paul Scholes | England | 11 February 2019 | 14 March 2019 | 7 | 1 | 3 | 3 | 14.29 | | |
| Pete Wild | England | 22 March 2019 | 7 May 2019 | 8 | 4 | 1 | 3 | 50.00 | | |
| Laurent Banide | France | 11 June 2019 | 19 September 2019 | 11 | 2 | 4 | 5 | 18.18 | | First manager from outside the British Isles |
| Dino Maamria | Tunisia | 19 September 2019 | 31 July 2020 | 32 | 9 | 10 | 13 | 28.13 | | First non-European manager |
| Harry Kewell | Australia | 1 August 2020 | 7 March 2021 | 41 | 17 | 6 | 18 | 41.46 | | |
| Keith Curle | England | 8 March 2021 | 24 November 2021 | 40 | 9 | 9 | 22 | 22.50 | | |
| Selim Benachour | Tunisia | 24 November 2021 | 22 January 2022 | 9 | 1 | 3 | 5 | 11.11 | | |
| John Sheridan | Ireland | 22 January 2022 | 17 September 2022 | 30 | 8 | 7 | 15 | 26.66 | | |
| David Unsworth | England | 20 September 2022 | 17 September 2023 | 51 | 14 | 16 | 19 | 31.37 | | |
| Steve Thompson | England | 17 September 2023 | 13 October 2023 | 6 | 3 | 3 | 0 | 50.00 | | |
| Paul Murray | England | 14 October 2023 | 14 October 2023 | 1 | 1 | 0 | 0 | 100.00 | | |
| Micky Mellon | Scotland | 15 October 2023 | | 143 | 56 | 43 | 44 | 39.16 | 1 National League Play offs winners (2025) | |

== See also ==
- History of Oldham Athletic A.F.C.
- Oldham Athletic A.F.C. seasons
