= Chris Porter (footballer, born 1983) =

English footballer

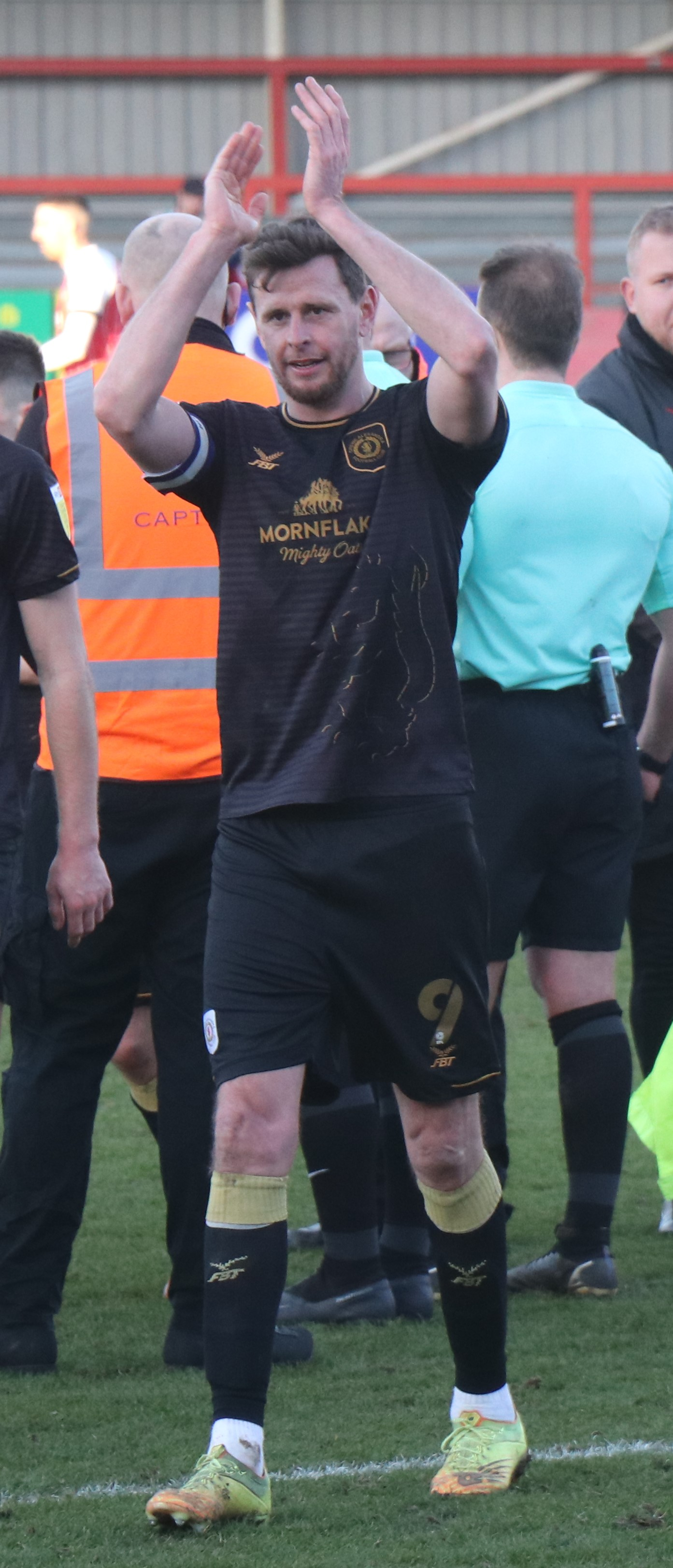
- Porter applauds Crewe Alexandra supporters after scoring the winner at Cheltenham Town on 26 February 2022

Personal information
- Full name: Christopher John Porter
- Date of birth: 12 December 1983 (age 42)
- Place of birth: Wigan, England
- Height: 6 ft 1 in (1.85 m)
- Position: Forward

Senior career*
Years	Team	Apps	(Gls)
2003–2005	Bury	71	(18)
2005–2007	Oldham Athletic	66	(28)
2007–2009	Motherwell	59	(23)
2009–2011	Derby County	44	(9)
2011–2015	Sheffield United	88	(15)
2013	→ Shrewsbury Town (loan)	5	(1)
2013	→ Chesterfield (loan)	3	(0)
2015–2017	Colchester United	91	(30)
2017–2022	Crewe Alexandra	168	(46)
2022–2023	Oldham Athletic	3	(1)
Total		598	(171)
- * Club domestic league appearances and goals

Christopher John Porter (born 12 December 1983) is an English former professional footballer who most recently played as a forward for Oldham Athletic

Porter began his career at Third Division side Bury, where he scored 20 goals in 78 appearances between 2003 and 2005. This prompted a move to League One club Oldham Athletic. He moved to the Scottish Premier League with Motherwell in 2007, before returning to England with Championship club Derby County. He dropped down a division in 2011, joining Sheffield United. With the Blades, he made over 100 appearances in 3½ years, scoring 23 goals. He had two short loan spells away from the club, playing for Shrewsbury Town and Chesterfield. He then joined Colchester United in January 2015, where he scored 30 goals in 95 appearances over 2½ seasons. In May 2017, he signed for Crewe Alexandra, scoring 54 goals in 189 appearances over five seasons at the Cheshire club before returning to Oldham in the summer of 2022.

== Career ==
=== Bury ===
Born in Wigan, Porter attended Queen Elizabeth's Grammar School in Blackburn, where he was a member of the school's Independent Schools Football Association Cup winning side in 2001. Having previously featured in the British Universities team, Porter had unsuccessful trials with Wigan Athletic and Blackpool before joining Bury on trial. He featured for the reserve team during the 2002–03 season in a 3–2 defeat to their Walsall counterparts. He scored Bury's two goals in the game, assisted on each occasion by Bury manager Andy Preece. Following the game, Preece said that "Chris still needs to get some more aggression into his game" and that he "looks a really good prospect". He then signed a short-term contract with the club.

==== 2002–03 season ====
Porter made the bench for Bury's Third Division 0–0 draw with Hartlepool United at Victoria Park on 7 March 2003, but was an unused substitute. He made his professional debut on 15 March when Bury travelled to Macclesfield Town. He came on to replace Terry Dunfield after 73 minutes of the 0–0 draw. He made his second and final appearance of the season on 3 May in Bury's 3–0 home defeat by Wrexham, when he replaced Paul O'Shaughnessy after 69 minutes.

==== 2003–04 season ====
During Bury's 2003–04 pre-season campaign, Porter scored the third in their 3–0 win over Leigh RMI, before scoring a hat-trick against a young Oldham Athletic side to stake a claim for a starting position in Bury's opening game of the season. His pre-season form paid dividends, earning a starting berth alongside David Nugent in the season opening 4–2 defeat against Swansea City on 9 August 2003. One week later, he scored his first professional goal in the 3–2 home defeat to Scunthorpe United. Porter, who said that "I didn't enjoy it [his debut goal] as much as I wanted because we lost", was withdrawn from the game after spraining his ankle. He made it two goals in two games on 23 August as his side saw off Kidderminster Harriers 2–0, but he again failed to complete the full 90 minutes with a recurrence of his ankle injury.

Porter scored his tenth and final goal of the season on 8 May as Bury beat Macclesfield 2–0 at Gigg Lane. He made 40 appearances in all competitions over the season.

==== 2004–05 season ====
In the newly renamed League Two, Porter scored his first goal of the season for Bury on 21 August 2004 in a 1–1 draw with Chester City. He received the first red card of his career on 28 September during a Football League Trophy first round match with Stockport County. Already on a yellow card, Porter was sent off in the 90th minute of the encounter, with the scores tied at 1–1. He bundled the ball into the net using his hand, and referee Mark Cowburn showed him a straight red for the handball offence. Bury eventually lost the game 3–1 after extra time, ending the game with nine men on the field. Following his suspension, he returned to score from the bench in the 1–1 draw at Leyton Orient on 9 October.

Porter had been a transfer target for Oldham Athletic ahead of their clash with Brentford on 15 March, with Oldham boss Ronnie Moore saying that the club had made "a reasonable offer". Bury manager Graham Barrow said there was "no chance of him leaving", with the club stating that Oldham wanted to take Porter on loan with a view to a permanent deal in the summer. The loan move never materialised, as Porter matched last seasons tally with his final goal of the season on 9 April when Bury drew 2–2 with Kidderminster. He scored ten goals in 36 appearances. With his contract expiring, Porter was offered a new contract to remain with Bury in the summer of 2005.

=== Oldham Athletic ===
After rejecting a new contract offer from Bury, Porter joined League One side Oldham Athletic on 22 June 2005, signing a two-year deal with the club. His aim was to "impress in pre-season, get a place in the starting line-up when the season starts and keep it". He also said he was "relishing the challenge" of playing at a higher level. Porter's transfer fee was subject to a tribunal, with Bury rejecting an initial £25,000 offer from Oldham. With Bury initially asking for £275,000, the tribunal set the transfer fee at £50,000 up front, with Bury receiving £25,000 after Porter had made 15 appearances for Oldham, and a further £25,000 after 30 games. The tribunal also added a 15% sell-on clause for any future transfer fee.

==== 2005–06 season ====
Porter scored on his League One debut on 6 August, heading in a Rob Scott throw-in after 24 minutes to help his side to a 2–0 win over Yeovil Town, despite carrying a knee injury. He scored the first hat-trick of his career when Oldham drew 3–3 with Brentford at Griffin Park on 19 November. His trio of goals, all headers, arrived within the first 23 minutes of the game, scoring all three in 12 minutes.

An ankle injury left Porter battling for fitness in February, and a knee injury left him only able to make sporadic appearances until the end of the season, requiring specialist treatment in the close season. He ended the season having made 35 appearances in the league and cups, scoring nine goals.

==== 2006–07 season ====
In the 2006–07 season, Porter opened his scoring account with a brace during a 2–0 win against Nottingham Forest on 12 September.

In March 2007, it was reported that Championship side Stoke City were interested in signing Porter on loan with a view to a permanent £600,000 move in the summer. Oldham manager John Sheridan expressed his anger at "people unsettling our players when we're trying to push for promotion". He also added that Porter had recently "missed five or six chances he'd usually put away. So something's up." After missing five games with knee damage, Porter returned to action in a 1–0 win over promotion rivals Yeovil on 31 March. He then scored his 20th goal of the season on 7 April in a 1–1 home draw with Huddersfield. Having turned down a £650,000 bid from Championship side Plymouth Argyle for Porter during the January transfer window, Oldham managing director Simon Corney believed that the club faced a battle to retain Porter's services in the summer, but said that "we don't want to stand in the way of players who can better themselves at bigger clubs", revealing that there was interest from a Premiership club. He scored his 22nd and final goal of the season with the only goal against Chesterfield on the final day of the season, securing a play-off place for his side. Porter described the goal as "the biggest goal of my career — maybe not the best but certainly the most important". He played in both the 2–1 play-off semi-final first leg defeat to Blackpool, and the 3–1 second leg defeat.

After making 40 first-team appearances and scoring 22 goals for Oldham, Oldham offered Porter a new contract to remain with the club. The club offered Porter what Simon Corney described as "a good contract", and with no decision made by the player in June, the club's owners decided to put a block on all incoming transfers while they waited to see if they would receive a transfer fee for Porter if he were to leave. Porter was also offered a chance to join Dundee United by manager Craig Levein, but withdrew the offer after Porter stalled in his decision. Levein added that he would only "want people who are desperate to come to this club. He just did not give that impression, so I wished him all the best and told him we are no longer interested".

=== Motherwell ===
Porter signed for Mark McGhee's Scottish Premier League side Motherwell on a free transfer on 3 July 2007.

==== 2007–08 season ====
Porter made his Motherwell debut on 4 August 2007 when his side earned a 1–0 away win at St Mirren. His first goal for the club arrived on 25 August with the winning goal in a 2–1 win against Gretna, a match which was designated an 'away' game while Gretna were ground sharing Fir Park with Motherwell. He scored 18 goals in 42 appearances.

==== 2008–09 season ====
Porter made his European debut in the UEFA Cup during the 2008–09 season, replacing John Sutton after 67 minutes of the 1–0 defeat to AS Nancy at the Stade Marcel-Picot on 18 September 2008. He started in the 2–0 home defeat by the French side in the return leg on 2 October. Between these games, Porter received his first red card since 2004 in a 2–1 extra time defeat at home to Hamilton Academical on 24 September in the League Cup. He scored his first goal of the season in Motherwell's 3–2 win over Falkirk on 5 October.

Porter scored his second career hat-trick for Motherwell on 27 December to help them to a 3–2 win over Inverness. Porter scored his eighth goal of the season with the only goal of the game as Motherwell beat Hearts at Fir Park on 7 January 2009. He scored his final Motherwell goal on 18 January with the final goal in a 4–0 away win over Dundee United. During January, Porter was subject to a number of bids from both Scottish and English clubs. With his contract expiring in the summer, and having already rejected speculation of a move to Hearts, Porter again rejected another move, this time back to England with League One club Huddersfield Town after a £200,000 bid. Later in January, Porter was again linked with a move away, on this occasion to Championship side Cardiff City, with Motherwell accepting a £400,000 offer for the player.

=== Derby County ===
After being linked with a move away from Motherwell to clubs including Heart of Midlothian, Huddersfield Town, Cardiff City, Sheffield United and Nottingham Forest, Porter finally made a move away from the Scottish club and back to England in the Championship with Derby County on 3 February 2009 for a fee in the region of £400,000. He became Derby manager Nigel Clough's first signing. He signed a 2½-year deal with County, saying that "I really enjoyed my time in Scotland and it was a difficult decision to leave Motherwell".

==== 2008–09 season ====
Porter made his debut for the club as a replacement for Rob Hulse in Derby's 3–0 win at Plymouth Argyle on 7 February 2009. He hoped to have a part to play when Derby faced Manchester United in the fourth round of the FA Cup on 15 February. Porter said: "I'm from Wigan and I support Manchester United, so it would be even more special to play against them". Porter came on for his home debut in the game, once again replacing Hulse, while the Rams were 3–1 down to United. Manchester United eventually won the match 4–1. After making his first start for the club in their 2–1 defeat to Doncaster Rovers, Porter continued in the starting eleven on 3 March in a game against Swansea City, and his selection paid off by scoring his first two goals for Derby in the 2–2 draw. He scored his third goal for Derby on 7 March, giving his side the lead by scoring from eight yards after just one minute of a 2–1 win against Bristol City. In the match, Porter was withdrawn at half-time, and was subsequently ruled out for the rest of the season with a hip injury.

==== 2009–10 season ====
Porter's hip injury left him out of action for four months. He returned for pre-season duty on 11 July 2009, scoring the only goal of the game in a friendly win against Burton Albion at the Pirelli Stadium. However, Porter's hip problem that ruled him out of the final stages of the 2008–09 season struck once again, with the player requiring an operation that would again rule him out for a number of months. He finally made his return to first-team action for the first time since March on 8 December, making a substitute appearance in Derby's 0–0 stalemate with Preston North End at Deepdale. He then scored his first goal of the season four days later on his 26th birthday, coming off the bench to give his side a 1–0 win at Watford.

Having featured mostly as a substitute for Derby, Porter began his most consistent run in the team during March, making five consecutive starts, but promised the club's staff and fans that after "a good pre-season and an injury-free season everybody will see the best of me and what I can do". He ended his season with 24 games played and four goals scored.

==== 2010–11 season ====
Ahead of the 2010–11 season, Porter was confident that he and his fellow strikers at Derby made up "one of the best strike forces in the Championship", and that "injuries hindered the team's progress last season". He missed a portion of pre-season after requiring an injection for his troublesome hip, but returned for a 3–3 friendly draw with AFC Bournemouth on 22 July. In his second appearance of the season, a 1–0 League Cup defeat to Crewe Alexandra on 10 August, Porter broke down with another hip injury, having to be replaced at half-time. He required further scans and specialist treatment to overcome the injury.

Porter returned to action for the first time in three months as a substitute in Derby's 2–1 defeat to Burnley on 27 November. He described his time out of action as "his worst time in football", not knowing the cause of the injury. He was selected to start for the New Year's Day trip to Preston, where he scored two goals to help his side to a 2–1 victory. With his contract expiring at the end of the season, Nigel Clough challenged Porter to "earn himself another contract". Over the next month, Porter was a regular feature in Clough's starting line-up, but the manager believed that Porter was "working hard without reward". Despite helping the Derby County reserve team to a league title, Porter continued to find himself in and out of the first-team in the latter stages of the season. On 12 May, it was revealed that Porter was to be released by the club and not offered a new contract after his deal expired. Injury restricted him to only 50 appearances with 25 starts, scoring nine goals.

=== Sheffield United ===
Porter signed for League One Sheffield United on 15 July 2011, signing a two-year contract.

==== 2011–12 season ====
Porter began the 2011–12 pre-season with a goal in a 1–1 friendly draw with Blackpool on 31 July. He made his full debut for the Blades, starting against his former club Oldham Athletic, in a 2–0 away win on the opening day of the season. He was replaced by Daniel Bogdanović after 78 minutes of play. Porter scored his first goal for the club against Yeovil Town on 27 August at Huish Park with the only goal of the game.

After helping his side to the play-offs, Porter scored the decisive goal to send the Blades through to the 2012 Football League One play-off final at Wembley Stadium as his side beat Stevenage 1–0 in the semi-final second leg on 14 May, following a 0–0 draw in the first leg. Sheffield United went on to lose the final to Huddersfield Town on penalties, with Porter replacing Richard Cresswell in the 85th minute of normal time. Porter concluded the season having made 44 appearances, scoring eight goals.

==== 2012–13 season ====
After a lengthy period of negotiation, Porter agreed a new two-year deal with Sheffield United in July 2012. He described his first season with the club as "slightly frustrating but I'm hoping to kick on this year". However, his first goal of the new season didn't arrive until 3 November, where he scored the winning goal in a 2–1 FA Cup win against Bristol Rovers.

Porter suffered an injury lay-off through much of December 2012 and January 2013. Meanwhile, Sheffield United manager Danny Wilson declared that there had been interest from other clubs in Porter.

==== Shrewsbury Town loan ====
After sitting in the stands watching Sheffield United defeat Shrewsbury Town 2–1 at the New Meadow on 9 February 2013, Porter was sent out on loan to Shrewsbury in an initial one-month loan deal on 13 February. Porter hoped to get "a run of games together" and he added "hopefully I'll get some goals". He did just that by scoring ten minutes into his debut during a 2–0 win over Tranmere Rovers at Prenton Park on 15 February, playing the full 90 minutes. After one month with Shrewsbury and having made five appearances, Porter returned to Sheffield.

==== Return to Sheffield United ====
Having been told by Blades manager Danny Wilson to seize his opportunity when selected in the first-team, Porter made an immediate impact after being introduced as a half-time substitute for Dave Kitson in his first match for the club since his return from his Shrewsbury loan. He scored the equalising goal 20 minutes after arriving on the pitch to earn a 1–1 draw with Walsall on 6 April 2013. Following Wilson's dismissal as manager, caretaker manager Chris Morgan selected Porter to start for his first game in charge on 13 April. Porter scored the opening goal of the game in a 2–0 win over Swindon Town. This goal represented a personal milestone for Porter, being his 100th career goal. He ended the season with four goals for United in 28 appearances.

==== 2013–14 season and Chesterfield loan ====
Again out of favour at Sheffield United, Porter signed on loan for League Two Chesterfield on 4 October 2013 for one month. He made his debut on 5 October as an 81st-minute substitute, replacing Gary McSheffrey in a 4–3 away defeat to Morecambe. He made three league appearances and one Football League Trophy appearances before returning to Sheffield United.

On his return to Sheffield, Porter's former manager David Weir had been replaced with Nigel Clough, who he had previously played under at Derby County. Clough was willing to allow Porter a chance to fight for his place in the first-team. He made his first start since his Chesterfield loan on 9 November 2013 in an FA Cup first round tie with Colchester United. He scored a late penalty kick to hand the Blades a 3–2 win. He finished the season with 41 appearances for Sheffield United with eleven goals scored.

==== 2014–15 season ====
Sheffield United had the option to automatically extend Porter's contract by a further 12-months following the expiry of his original two-year deal. The option was not exercised after the club decided to offer Porter an alternate deal, while still keeping the player on the 'retained list'. After delaying signing a reduced-terms offer, Porter eventually signed a new one-year deal on 10 June 2014.

The club planned to let Porter leave the club on loan during the January transfer window. It was then revealed in January 2015 that two potential buyers had spoken to Porter about his availability on a permanent transfer after being told he was surplus to requirements at Bramall Lane. After making just five appearances in the 2014–15 season, Clough announced that Porter was able to leave the club on a free transfer.

=== Colchester United ===
After having his Sheffield United contract terminated, on 22 January 2015, Porter signed an 18-month deal with Colchester United.

==== 2014–15 season ====
Porter made his debut for the U's on 24 January, starting in the 2–0 relegation battle victory over Leyton Orient, before being substituted for Macauley Bonne in injury time. He scored his first goal for the club in his second game, opening the scoring against Bradford City at Valley Parade on 31 January in a 1–1 draw. He ended the season with seven league goals in 21 appearances for Colchester.

==== 2015–16 season ====
Ahead of the 2015–16 season, Porter was named as club captain on 21 July 2015. After an injury blighted the start to his season, Porter scored his first goal of the campaign on 21 November in a 4–1 defeat by Millwall after coming on as a half-time substitute for Marvin Sordell.

With the club struggling in League One, on 19 February U's manager Kevin Keen decided to hand the club captaincy to Owen Garvan "for the foreseeable future" and to "take a little of the responsibility off him [Porter]". The following day, Porter scored his first goal in over a month with the opener against Bury as the U's fell to a 5–2 defeat. He made 35 appearances during the season and scored seven goals.

==== 2016–17 season ====
Porter scored his first goal of the season and assisted both Colchester's goals in their 2–0 away victory at Wycombe Wanderers on 27 August 2016. He scored a brace in Colchester's 3–2 win over Blackpool on 10 September, with his performance against earning him a place in the EFL 'Team of the Week'. He was again named in the EFL Team of the Week after scoring a brace in Colchester's 2–1 win against Luton Town on 25 March 2017. He finished the season having scored 16 goals in 39 appearances.

=== Crewe Alexandra ===
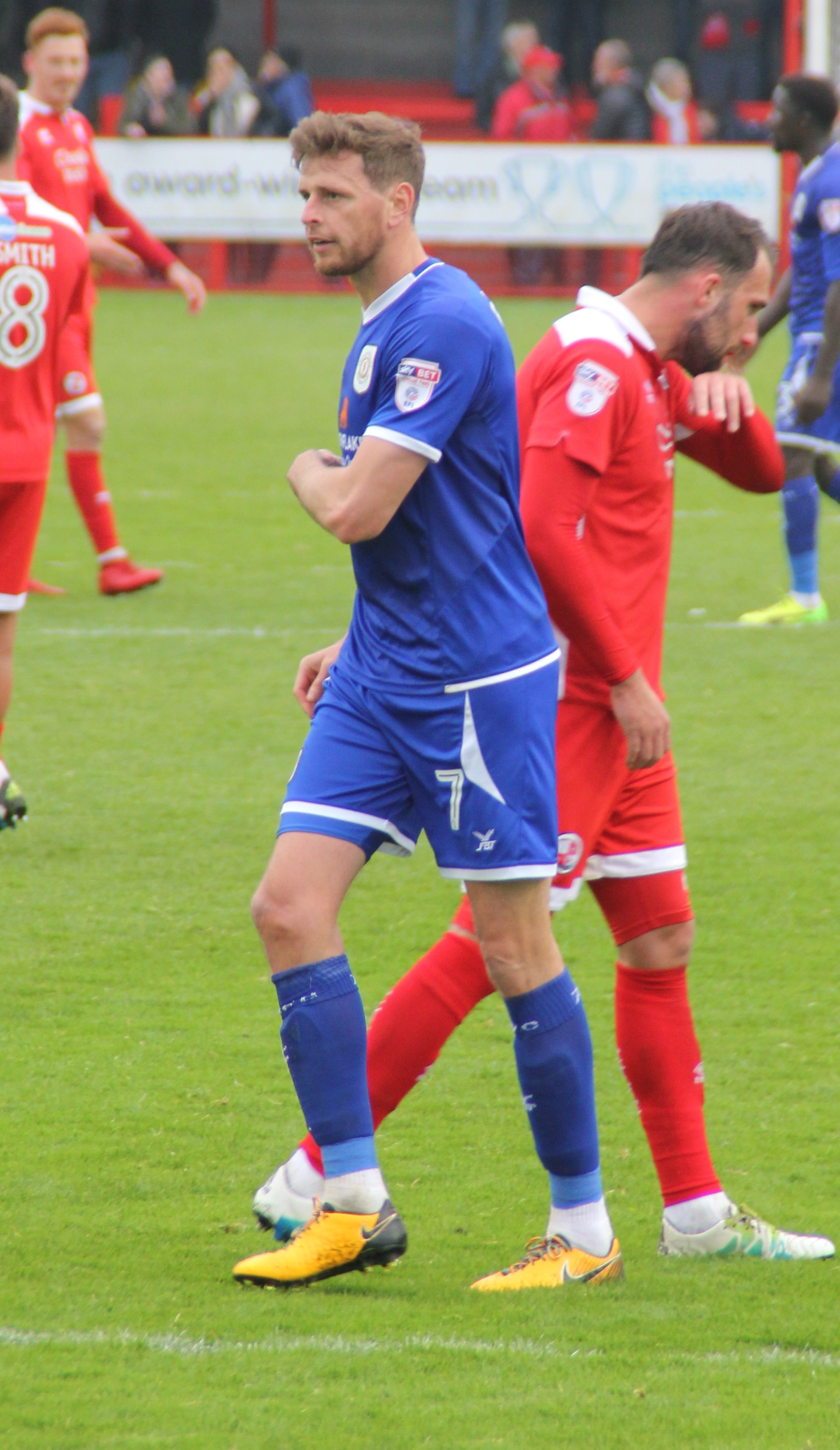
Chris Porter (2018)

On 31 May 2017, Porter signed a two-year contract with League Two side Crewe Alexandra on a free transfer after turning down a new contract offer from Colchester. He scored twice for Crewe on his debut in a 2–2 draw with Mansfield Town on 5 August 2017. After scoring 27 goals in his first two seasons at Crewe, an extra 12 months was added to Porter's initial contract, and after scoring his 10th goal of the (pandemic-shortened) 2019-2020 season on his 100th appearance, he was reported to have asked manager David Artell about a contract for the 2020–2021 season.

Porter was offered a new contract in June 2020, but after rejecting the initial 12-month offer signed a new one-year deal in July 2020. However, his return to the first team was delayed due to a thigh injury. He scored seven goals in 37 appearances, and on 13 May 2021, Crewe announced that it had offered Porter a new contract. On 24 May 2021, Porter signed a new one-year deal, and in his fifth season took his Crewe goal tally to 50 goals with the opening goal in a 1–1 draw against Doncaster Rovers at Gresty Road on 2 November 2021. He scored six goals in 41 appearances during the season, many of which came as "an impact substitute". On 29 April 2022, it was confirmed Porter would leave Crewe at the end of the season.

=== Oldham Athletic ===
On 6 June 2022, Porter rejoined Oldham Athletic, recently relegated to the National League, on a one-year contract having spent two seasons with the club 15 years earlier. He scored the first goal of his new spell at Boundary Park on 13 August 2022 in a 3–2 win over Dorking Wanderers, but suffered a hamstring injury which restricted him to one appearance, in a FA Cup fourth qualifying round win over Chester, after which he was diagnosed with deep vein thrombosis (DVT) above his knee. In February 2023, he was reported to be unlikely to play again for Oldham for the remainder of the season. He was released by Oldham at the end of the season.

== Career statistics ==
As of match played 18 October 2022

Appearances and goals by club, season and competition
Club	Season	League			National Cup		League Cup		Europe		Other		Total	
Club	Season	Division	Apps	Goals	Apps	Goals	Apps	Goals	Apps	Goals	Apps	Goals	Apps	Goals
Bury	2002–03	Third Division	2	0	0	0	0	0	–		0	0	2	0
Bury	2003–04	Third Division	37	9	1	1	1	0	–		1 (Note: Appearance(s) in Football League Trophy)	0	40	10
Bury	2004–05	League Two	32	9	2	1	1	0	–		1	0	36	10
Bury	Bury total		71	18	3	2	2	0	–		2	0	78	20
Oldham Athletic	2005–06	League One	31	7	3	2	0	0	–		1	0	35	9
Oldham Athletic	2006–07	League One	35	21	3	1	0	0	–		2 (Note: Appearances in English Football League play-offs)	0	40	22
Oldham Athletic	Oldham Athletic total		66	28	6	3	0	0	–		3	0	75	31
Motherwell	2007–08	Scottish Premier League	37	14	2	2	3	2	–		–		42	18
Motherwell	2008–09	Scottish Premier League	22	9	0	0	1	0	2 (Note: Appearances in UEFA Cup)	0	–		25	9
Motherwell	Motherwell total		59	23	2	2	4	2	2	0	–		67	27
Derby County	2008–09	Championship	5	3	1	0	0	0	–		–		6	3
Derby County	2009–10	Championship	21	4	3	0	0	0	–		–		24	4
Derby County	2010–11	Championship	18	2	1	0	1	0	–		–		20	2
Derby County	Derby County Total		44	9	5	0	1	0	–		–		50	9
Sheffield United	2011–12	League One	34	5	3	1	1	0	–		6	2	44	8
Sheffield United	2012–13	League One	21	3	3	1	1	0	–		3	0	28	4
Sheffield United	2013–14	League One	32	7	8	4	1	0	–		0	0	41	11
Sheffield United	2014–15	League One	1	0	0	0	2	0	–		2	0	5	0
Sheffield United	Sheffield United total		88	15	14	6	5	0	–		11	2	118	23
Shrewsbury Town (loan)	2012–13	League One	5	1	–		–		–		–		5	1
Chesterfield (loan)	2013–14	League Two	3	0	–		–		–		1	0	4	0
Colchester United	2014–15	League One	21	7	–		–		–		–		21	7
Colchester United	2015–16	League One	32	7	3	0	0	0	–		0	0	35	7
Colchester United	2016–17	League Two	38	16	0	0	0	0	–		1	0	39	16
Colchester United	Colchester United total		91	30	3	0	0	0	–		1	0	95	30
Crewe Alexandra	2017–18	League Two	31	9	3	2	1	1	–		2	0	37	12
Crewe Alexandra	2018–19	League Two	40	13	1	0	-	-	–		2	2	43	15
Crewe Alexandra	2019–20	League Two	26	12	3	1	2	1	–		0	0	31	14
Crewe Alexandra	2020–21	League One	35	6	1	1	0	0	–		1	0	37	7
Crewe Alexandra	2021–22	League One	36	6	1	0	1	0	–		3	0	41	6
Crewe Alexandra	Crewe Alexandra total		168	46	9	4	4	2	–		8	2	189	54
Oldham Athletic	2022–23	National League	3	1	1	0	0	0	–		0	0	4	1
Career total			598	171	43	17	16	4	2	0	26	4	685	196
