= History of Oldham Athletic A.F.C. =

History of an English football club

The history of Oldham Athletic A.F.C. football team began in 1895.

== 1895–1923: Early success ==
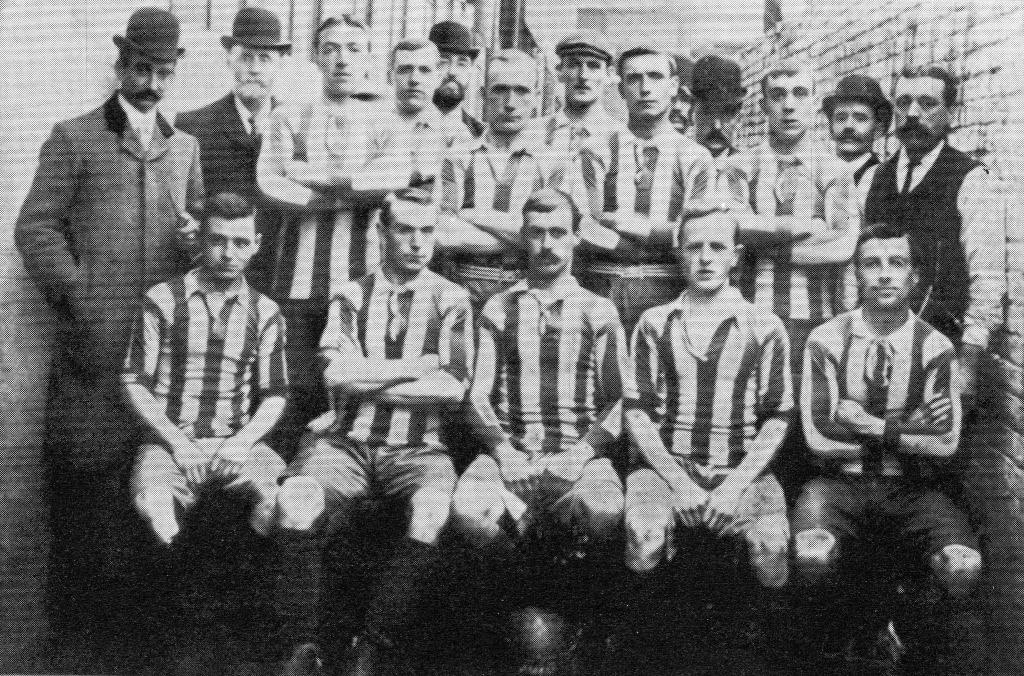
Oldham Athletic in 1905 with manager David Ashworth (far left)

The club was formed in 1895 as Pine Villa F.C. before being renamed to Oldham Athletic in 1899. Attaining professional status in the same year, the Latics played in the local Manchester leagues before gaining entry into the Football League Second Division in 1907. Two seasons later, the club gained its first ever promotion, finishing ahead of Hull City by virtue of a superior goal average. In their first ever top flight campaign the Latics finished in seventh position. Oldham reached the FA Cup semi-final in 1913, followed by a top four league placing in the 1913–14 season. The outbreak of the First World War coincided with the Latics' best ever league season, as the team finished second in the Football League in the 1914–15 season, missing out on the title by one point. Following the war, however, the team consistently finished near the bottom of the table, culminating in a last-place finish and relegation in 1923.

== 1923–1940: Interwar struggles ==
Back in the second division for the first time since 1910, Oldham finished around the top half for several seasons before missing out on promotion by two points in 1930 to Chelsea. Mid-table finishes followed until 1935 when the club finished 21st in table and were relegated to the Third Division (North). Successive top five finishes occurred at the new lower level until the outbreak of the Second World War saw the cancellation of the domestic league programme.

== 1946–1970: Postwar plight ==
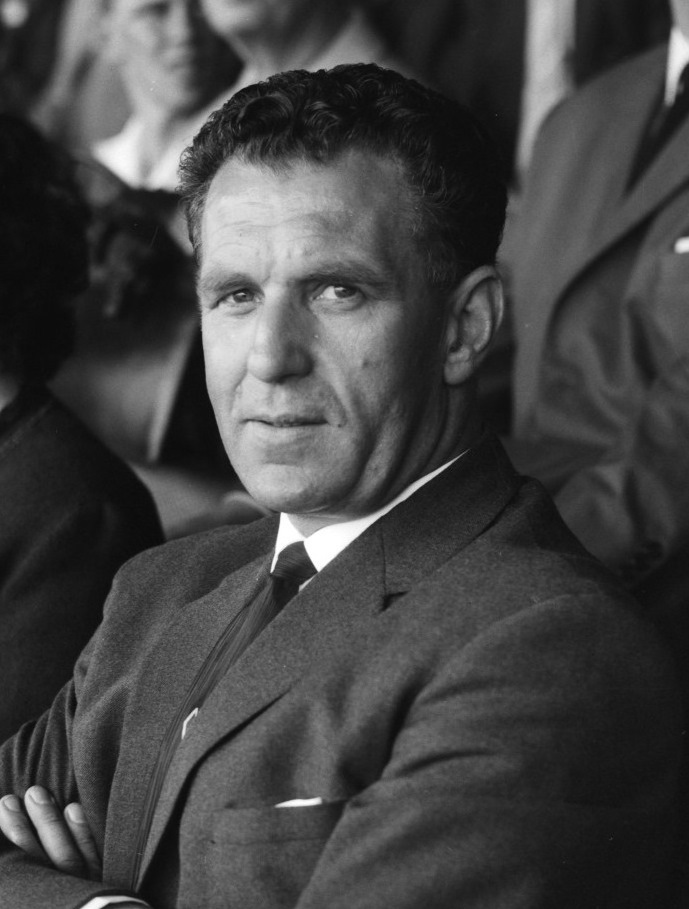
Manager Jack Rowley led Oldham to promotion in 1963.

Again, the outbreak of war hit Oldham hard and, as with the First World War, the club's results deteriorated significantly when the football league resumed finishing in 19th position in the first post-war league season. Disappointing mid-table finishes followed in the subsequent seasons before the signing of former England international George Hardwick as player-manager in 1950 proved the catalyst to a promotion as Third Division (North) champions in 1953. Hopes were again high at Boundary Park but the Latics slumped to relegation after only one season back in the higher tier. Only 25 points were gained from 42 games and 17 of 21 away games ended in defeat.

Back in the Third Division (North) after only one season, Oldham found themselves established in midtable in the division until 1958 when the club's 15th-place finish meant that they became founder members of the new nationalized Fourth Division, two years later having the embarrassment of having to apply for re-election to the Football League with only Hartlepools United finishing below them.

Promotion to the Third Division was achieved in 1963 under the management of Jack Rowley. Two years later the flamboyant Ken Bates took over as chairman. Despite Bates' financial ability to purchase players, narrow escapes from relegation occurred in 1965 and 1966, before the inevitable relegation back to the basement division finally occurred in 1969. With this, Bates left the club, and the result was a poor financial situation and a low finish in the Fourth Division in 1970.

== 1970–1982: Frizzell's Latics ==
Scottish defender Jimmy Frizzell took on a player-manager role during the 1969–70 season and led the Latics to promotion in 1971. Back in the Third Division, a mid-table finish was achieved in 1972 before the Latics missed out on promotion by just three points the following season. An incredible run of ten consecutive league wins during the 1973–74 season (still a club record to this day) laid the foundations for Oldham to win the Third Division title and find themselves back in the Second Division for the first time since 1954.

Frizzell did an excellent job of keeping the Latics away from relegation danger at this higher level, despite tighter finances and lesser gates than many of their rivals. It was therefore a shock that, in 1982 after twelve highly successful years in charge, the popular Scotsman was sacked. He had, however, laid the foundations for what was to come.

== The Joe Royle era: 1982 to 1994 ==
=== 1982–1989: Pushing for promotion ===
One of the most successful, and also longest-serving managers in Oldham Athletic's history was Joe Royle, who took over from Jimmy Frizzell just before the start of the 1982–83 season. Royle's first four seasons in charge resulted in moderate mid-table finishes before the first signs of success arrived during the 1986–87 season. That season, the club finished third in the Second Division on their new artificial astroturf surface, a position which would have been good enough for automatic promotion in any of the previous thirteen seasons. Unfortunately for Oldham, the 1986–87 season saw the introduction of the promotion play-offs, and they were eventually defeated by Leeds United on the away goals rule in the play-off semi-final.

=== 1989–1990: The Latics reach Wembley ===
In the 1989–90 season, Oldham reached the final of the Football League Cup. In the second round, striker Frankie Bunn scored six goals, a League Cup record, as Scarborough were thrashed 7–0. The club were in the Second Division promotion play-off zone by the time the League champions Arsenal arrived in the League Cup third round. More than 15,000 Oldham fans were in the crowd as the champions were beaten 3–1. The win set up the Latics' first quarter-final appearance in the League Cup, where they drew 2–2 away against First Division Southampton, with Andy Ritchie scoring an equaliser in the fourth minute of injury time to set up a replay at Boundary Park. Oldham won this 2–0, and then beat Second Division promotion rivals West Ham United 6–0 in the first leg of the semi-finals. The 3–0 second leg defeat at Upton Park proved irrelevant and Oldham were on their way to Wembley for the first time in their 95-year history.

At the same time, Oldham had started another excellent cup run, this time in the FA Cup. Third Division Birmingham City took a 1–0 lead at their St. Andrews ground in the third round, but a late equalizer from Bunn led to a replay at Boundary Park. In the replay, Rick Holden scored an excellent solo goal to give the Latics a 1–0 win and set up a fourth round tie at home to Second Division Brighton & Hove Albion. Brighton took a first half lead before two goals in a minute from Scott McGarvey and Ritchie gave Oldham a hard-fought 2–1 win. First Division Everton were the visitors to Boundary Park for the fifth round tie, and raced into a 2–0 half time lead thanks to goals from Tony Cottee and future Oldham player/manager Graeme Sharp. A second half fightback saw the underdogs claim a draw thanks to an Ritchie penalty and a late Roger Palmer header. The replay at Goodison Park was again a draw – ex-Evertonian Ian Marshall's close range header for Oldham being cancelled out by a disputed Kevin Sheedy penalty. Another replay was required, and this time Oldham prevailed – a goal from Palmer and a penalty from Marshall cancelling out Cottee's early strike to give Oldham a 2–1 win and hand them another home tie, this time against First Division leaders Aston Villa. The Villains were beaten 3–0 thanks to Holden's 20-yard (18 m) effort, Neil Redfearn's close range finish and a Chris Price own goal. The Latics' first FA Cup semi-final appearance since 1913 saw them pitted against old local rivals Manchester United at Manchester City's Maine Road ground.

Despite talk in the press of Oldham struggling away from their artificial home surface, the game was a classic. Earl Barrett tapped in from close range to give the Latics the lead after just five minutes, but Bryan Robson equalised before half-time. Neil Webb's goal for United with less than twenty minutes remaining looked to have won the tie, but a volley from Marshall just five minutes later pegged United back. With the game going into extra time, a Danny Wallace goal for United again looked to have won it, before Latics stalwart Palmer scored another equaliser at 3–3.

The replay was just as exciting, although it proved to be controversial. Brian McClair gave United a second half lead before Ritchie stunned his old side with an equaliser ten minutes from time. Sadly for the Latics there was to be no fairytale ending and Mark Robins, born in nearby Ashton-under-Lyne, scored a winner late in extra time for the Manchester side. It was later proved on television replays that a Nick Henry effort in the first half had crossed the line, but referee Joe Worrall failed to award the goal.

After their FA Cup semi-final, Oldham succumbed to a 1–0 defeat against Nottingham Forest in the League Cup Final.

=== 1990–1994: Promotion and Premier League ===
The 1990–91 season culminated with the Latics regaining their top flight status after 68 years. Oldham were never out of the top two in the league all season and guaranteed promotion with a 2–1 win at Ipswich Town with four games remaining. The last day of the season saw the Latics entertain Sheffield Wednesday at home, themselves already promoted. The Latics still harboured hopes of winning the Second Division title, but for this to happen they needed to beat the Owls at home and hope that rivals West Ham United failed to beat fourth placed Notts County. Wednesday raced into a two-goal lead, but goals from Ian Marshall and 17-year-old debutant Paul Bernard levelled the game and set up a tense finish. In stoppage time, Athletic were awarded a penalty. In extremely tense circumstances, Neil Redfearn scored to clinch the Second Division championship.

In the first season of the Premier League (1992–93), Oldham gained 49 points from 42 fixtures to stay up by the narrowest of margins. With three games remaining, the Latics had attained 40 points and looked doomed, lying second from bottom. To survive relegation, three wins from their final three matches were required, and the Latics had to bank on Crystal Palace gaining no more than one point from their final two matches. Oldham's first game of the final trio was away at second-placed Aston Villa, a side who had to win to have any hope of winning that year's title. In a battling display, Latics stalwart Nick Henry scored the winner midway through the first half, a result that handed Manchester United their first title for 27 years. Three days later, Liverpool were beaten 3–2 at Boundary Park, while Crystal Palace could only draw at Manchester City. For Oldham to survive, they had to beat fellow strugglers Southampton at home and hope that Crystal Palace were defeated at Arsenal's Highbury ground. Oldham eventually won 4–3 despite leading 4–1 at one stage, whilst Palace lost 3–0 at Arsenal, meaning that the Eagles were relegated on goal difference.

Oldham reached another FA Cup semi-final in 1993–94, again facing Manchester United. The match at Wembley Stadium looked to be going Oldham's way, with Oldham holding a 1–0 lead until Manchester United's Mark Hughes scored a last gasp equalizer in the penultimate minute of extra time. A poor performance in the replay at Maine Road ended Oldham's hopes, and culminated in a disastrous run of results, with the Latics' failing to win any of their remaining seven fixtures. A month later they were relegated from the Premier League after three seasons in the top flight.

== 1994–98: Royle departs and the Latics slump ==
Joe Royle was lured to Everton in October 1994 and 34-year-old striker Graeme Sharp was appointed Oldham's player-manager, however he resigned in February of the 1996–97 season. Relegation to the third tier for the first time in 23 years was confirmed three months later following a defeat at Reading. Sharp's replacement, Neil Warnock, left after 15 months in charge.

== 1998–2001: Disappointment under Andy Ritchie ==
Former striker Andy Ritchie took over from Warnock in the summer of 1998 but he too was unable to turn things around and Ritchie's first season in charge almost proved to be disastrous. After losing a number of key players during the weeks after his reign began, Ritchie's squad of free transfers and youth team players struggled throughout the 1998–99 season, only avoiding being dragged into the relegation fight by winning their final two matches at home to Stoke City and Reading. The signing of the highly talented veteran Irish international midfielder John Sheridan proved to be the season's only high point.

Hopes were high at the start of the 2000–01 season after a 4–1 opening day win at home to newly relegated Port Vale, but a run of 11 games without a win saw the club slump to second bottom in the league, making relegation look a real possibility. The signings of veteran winger David Eyres and midfielder Tony Carss gave the side added impetus and the Latics recovered well to again finish comfortably mid-table.

== 2001–2003: Financial uncertainty ==
During the 2001 close season, local businessman Chris Moore purchased Oldham Athletic, with the promise of providing Premiership football within the next five years.

After a whirlwind start to the 2001–02 season, the Latics lost three consecutive matches and slipped to eighth position, and manager Andy Ritchie was sacked after guiding the Latics to first in the league earlier in the season. Ritchie was offered an alternative role as director of football but declined the offer. His replacement was Mick Wadsworth, a nomadic manager, and several Moore funded big money signings followed. The result was a disappointing ninth-placed finish at the end of the season, although there were high hopes for the following campaign. Wadsworth was also sacked however, and was replaced by his assistant Iain Dowie.

Dowie's expensive side began the 2002–03 season with a narrow home defeat to Cardiff City but recovered well to lose only seven more games for the rest of the season, just two of them away games. The Latics narrowly missed out on automatic promotion, gaining 82 points from their 46 league games to gain entry into the end of season play-offs. The play-off campaign ended in heartbreaking disappointment for Oldham, with Queens Park Rangers winning a tense battle with a late goal at their Loftus Road ground.

Worse was to come for the club, with chairman Moore deciding to end his interest in the club, refusing to finance reported losses of £50,000 a week. The club was forced into administration in October 2003, and was reportedly close to folding when American businessmen Danny Gazal, Simon Blitz and Simon Corney bought it in February 2004.

== 2003–2007: Relegation dog fighters ==
Dowie left the club to join Crystal Palace in December 2003, and in March 2004 Brian Talbot took over as manager and the team lost only one of his first thirteen games in charge, against bottom club Wycombe Wanderers, the result being the Latics finishing comfortably in mid-table. In the 2004–05 season the Latics defeated Premier League club Manchester City in the FA Cup, but manager Talbot left the club the following month. Former Rotherham United manager Ronnie Moore took charge, and the club just avoided relegation, winning their final game of the season at home in a derby with Bradford City. Moore was sacked on 1 June 2006 and immediately replaced by reserve team coach John Sheridan. In the 2006–07 season Oldham finished in sixth place, but for the second time in five seasons lost in the play-offs.

== 2007–2022 ==
In the 2007–08 season, Oldham finished in 8th place, nine points below the play-off positions. Oldham started the 2008–09 season well, going unbeaten in their first 8 games. After two years with the club, manager John Sheridan was sacked on 15 March 2009, immediately being replaced by former manager Joe Royle. After being offered the job on a permanent basis, Royle rejected the offer and announced that he would be leaving the club after the final game of the season. Darlington F.C. boss Dave Penney was announced as Royle's successor on 30 April 2009, though Royle still was in charge until season's end. Oldham finished in tenth place at the close of the 2008–09 season.

Dave Penney was dismissed as Oldham manager on 6 May 2010, with his assistant, Martin Gray, taking over as caretaker manager for the final game of season 2009–10. During June 2010, Paul Dickov was named as Oldham Athletic player-manager signing a one-year contract. On 3 February 2013, he left his role as manager despite having recently knocked Liverpool out of the FA Cup the previous week. On 18 March, the club hired Lee Johnson to become the newest manager and, at the time of his appointment, was the youngest manager in the Football League at 31 years old. The club narrowly avoided relegation for the 2012–13 season, finishing 19th and just three points above the drop zone. The club fared better in Johnson's second season, finishing mid-table at 15th.

In January 2015, it was reported that Oldham was attempting to sign Ched Evans, an accused rapist. The move faced a significant public backlash, even from politicians, while a petition against the signing gained 60,000 signatures and Verlin Rainwater Solutions withdrew club sponsorship. Oldham ultimately decided not to sign Evans due to "unbearable pressure" while condemning the "vile and abusive threats, some including death threats, which have been made to our fans, sponsors and staff".

In January 2018, Moroccan football agent Abdallah Lemsagam agreed a deal with the club's majority shareholder Simon Corney, which ended Corney's 14-year association with Oldham Athletic. Corney had bought the club, along with Danny Gazal and Simon Blitz, in 2004, saving it from potential liquidation. Gazal and Blitz had left in 2010, with Corney staying as the majority shareholder.

Lemsagam currently owns 97 per cent of the football club, while the Supporters Trust maintain their 3 per cent stake. The takeover did not include Boundary Park's North Stand, which the club does not own but has use of on match days. In the two years prior to the Lemsagam deal, Oldham had faced a number of winding-up orders for non-payment of their tax bills, and saw their ground raided by HMRC in November 2017.

Oldham Athletic were relegated to League Two on 5 May 2018. The club faced further HMRC winding-up petitions in late 2019 and early 2020. Former owner Blitz sought to put the club into administration on 6 March 2020 because of debts owed to his company, Brass Bank, which owns Boundary Park, but the case was adjourned to 21 April after a "significant" sum of the debt was paid, as was Oldham's tax debt to HMRC. One-time Watford owner Laurence Bassini was reported to be interested in buying the club, but this was labelled as "false" during the 6 March 2020 hearing.

Former Australia international Harry Kewell took over as Oldham manager in August 2020, at the start of the 2020-21 EFL League Two season and recorded 11 wins, 6 draws and 15 defeats before he was sacked by the club in March 2021. He left the club 10 points above the relegation places; some fans regarded the club's decision as premature given that Oldham had recently beaten promotion challengers Newport, Forest Green and Salford City. Keith Curle stepped in as temporary head coach, and made the move permanent in May 2021, but his efforts to build a stronger squad were hampered by an EFL transfer embargo, COVID-19 illness, and fans protests against the club's owners. On 7 September 2021, with the club in 23rd position in the fourth tier, Lemsagam insisted he did not wish to sell his stake in the club. Curle left Oldham in November 2021. In December 2021, three fans were banned for "promoting their dislike" of the club's owner; while the bans were overturned after a public outcry, protests continued, Lemsagam announced he was willing to sell the club amid accusations of late payment of salaries, threats of player strikes, and concerns about administration (eventually avoided). John Sheridan was appointed manager in January 2022, but could not halt the slide towards the National League. Oldham were relegated from the English Football League following a 2–1 home defeat by Salford City, a match interrupted by an on-pitch protest by fans against the club's owners. The club became the first former Premier League team to drop into non-league since its creation in 1992.

=== 2022–present: the National League ===
Following the relegation, Lemsagam and the Boundary Park owner agreed to a sale, and in June 2022 it was reported Oldham Athletic could be sold to a local business. In July 2022, the club was sold to businessman Frank Rothwell, owner of Oldham-based Manchester Cabins. Oldham negotiations to buy Boundary Park from former owner Simon Blitz were then concluded in late August 2022.

Oldham started their first National League campaign with just two wins from their first eight games. Sheridan stepped down as manager on 17 September 2022 and was replaced by David Unsworth. Unsworth led Oldham to a 12th-place finish.

After winning one of their first nine matches of the 2023–24 season, Unsworth was sacked with the Latics in 22nd-place in the National League.
