= Paul O'Shaughnessy =

Paul O'Shaughnessy may refer to:

- Paul O'Shaughnessy (musician) (born 1961), Irish fiddler
- Paul O'Shaughnessy (footballer) (born 1981), English footballer
