= Gunby =

Gunby may refer to:

- Gunby, East Riding of Yorkshire, England
- Gunby, East Lindsey, Lincolnshire, England
- Gunby, South Kesteven, Lincolnshire, England
- Gunby (surname)
