= Frank Rothwell (businessman) =

English businessman

Frank Rothwell OBE is an English businessman and the owner of football team Oldham Athletic. Rothwell bought the club in July 2022.

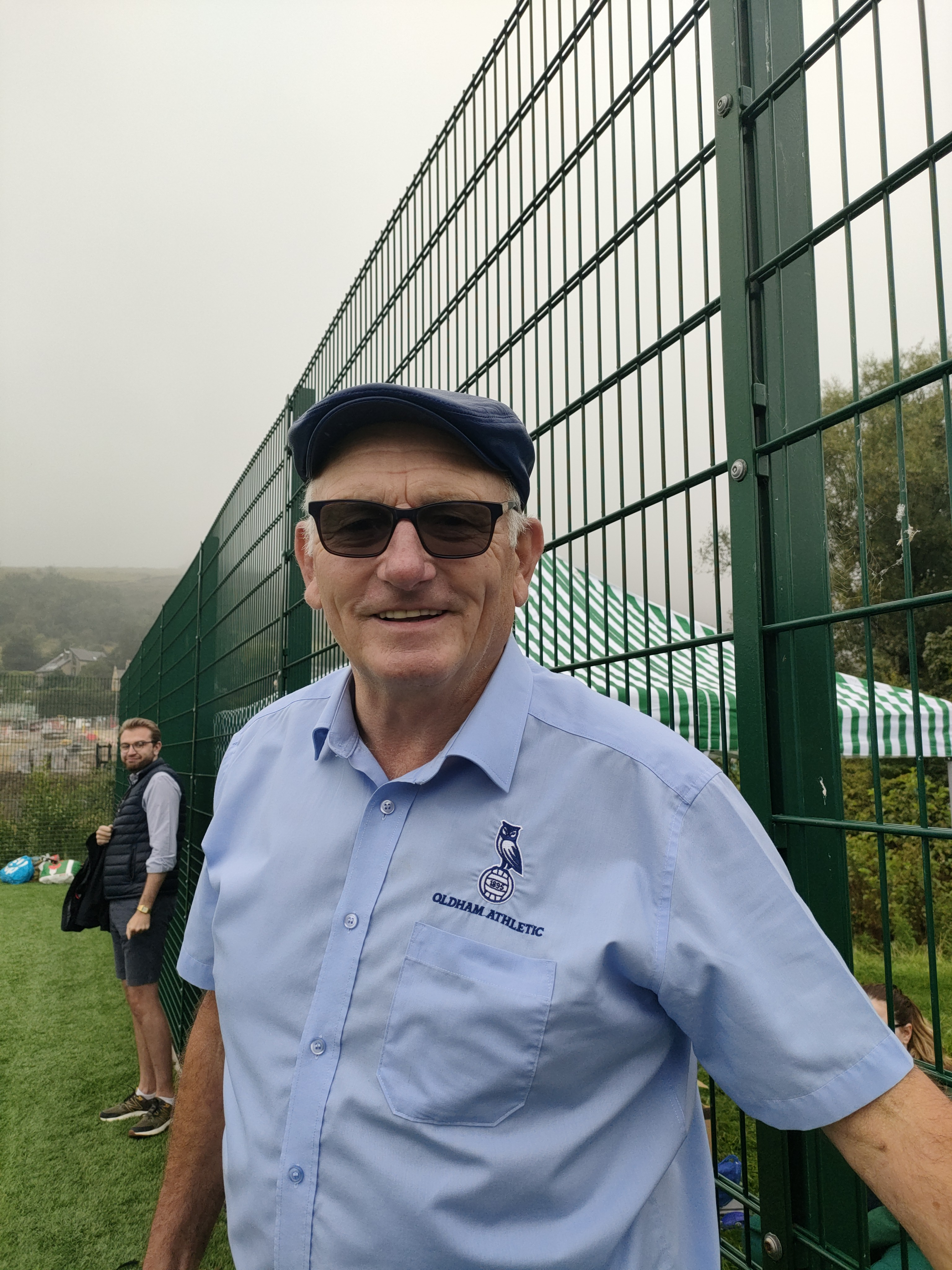
Frank Rothwell

In February 2021, at age 70, he became the oldest person to complete the Talisker Whisky Atlantic Challenge, a solo row across the Atlantic Ocean. At the age of 73, he undertook a second journey, finishing in February 2024. He raised £1.1 million on his first trip and £253,000 on his second, also setting a new world record as the oldest person to row solo across any ocean. In 2025 he received an OBE for his charitable services to dementia research.
