= Bob Mellor =

Football coach who managed Oldham Athletic AFC

Managerial career
- Years: Team
- 1924–1927: Oldham Athletic
- 1934–1945: Oldham Athletic

Bob Mellor was an English football coach who managed Oldham Athletic. He also served as club secretary, and worked for the club for 43 years.
