= Ian Wood (footballer, born 1948) =

English footballer

Personal information
- Full name: Ian Thomas Wood
- Date of birth: 15 January 1948 (age 78)
- Place of birth: Radcliffe, England
- Position: Right back

Senior career*
Years	Team	Apps	(Gls)
1965–1979	Oldham Athletic	525	(22)
1974	→ Denver Dynamos (loan)	6	(0)
1978–1979	→ San Jose Earthquakes (loan)	49	(5)
1980–1981	Burnley	17	(0)
1981–1982	Wichita Wings	40	(6)
1982–1983	Radcliffe Borough	?	(?)
Total		582	(28)
- * Club domestic league appearances and goals

Ian Thomas Wood (born 15 January 1948 in Radcliffe, Lancashire, England) is an English former footballer whose fifteen years service and record breaking 525 appearances for Oldham Athletic made him a Boundary Park legend.
