= Gino Pozzo =

Italian businessman and football club owner (born 1965)

- Born: 1965 (age 60–61)
- Education: Harvard University
- Known for: Owner of Watford FC
- Spouse: Carla
- Children: 2 daughters, 1 son
- Father: Giampaolo Pozzo

Gino Pozzo (born 1965) is an Italian businessman and the owner of Watford F.C., who owns a sports investment group focused on the football sector.

== Early life ==
He is the son of Italian businessman Giampaolo Pozzo and a member of the Pozzo family.

== Career ==
After leaving university, Pozzo became involved in football in his early 20s, focusing on talent scouting and player development. He is involved in the day-to-day running of Watford, as well as negotiating transfers between his father's football club Udinese in Italy.

Pozzo and his family have owned multiple clubs, including Watford, Udinese, and Granada (with Granada sold to Chinese businessman Jiang Lizhang in June 2016). They have transferred players between these clubs.

Pozzo manages an international scouting team of 25 to 30 people who attend competitions worldwide, particularly in South America, Africa, and Eastern Europe. The family has invested in players and transferred them between clubs before selling them.

The approach has been applied at Udinese for over 25 years, and some sources have described it as a "talent factory". Granada and Watford were promoted to La Liga and the Premier League, respectively, under Pozzo family ownership.

=== Watford ===
In June 2012, Pozzo and his father acquired Watford from previous owner Laurence Bassini. Pozzo became the sole owner in 2014.

Pozzo attends the training grounds and monitors player performance data through GPS devices. He has limited direct contact with players.

Decisions on player transfers are made by Gino Pozzo, Scott Duxbury (chief executive of Watford), and Gianluca Nani (sporting director of Watford). The club has acquired players from South America.

Watford were promoted from the Football League Championship to the Premier League on 25 April 2015. Since 2015, Watford's annual revenues have increased by more than £100m.

During Pozzo's ownership, Watford has appointed 19 different managers over 13 years.

In 2019, Watford reached the FA Cup Final but lost to Manchester City.

In the 2019–20 season, Watford finished in 19th place in the Premier League and were relegated to the EFL Championship.

In the 2020–21 season, Watford finished in second place in the EFL Championship and were promoted to the Premier League.

In the 2021–22 season, Watford finished in 19th place in the Premier League and were relegated to the EFL Championship.

In the 2022–23 season, Watford finished in eleventh place in the EFL Championship. In the 2023–24 season, Watford finished in 15th place.

== Personal life ==
Pozzo is married to Carla Pozzo and they have two daughters and a son. They live outside London.
