= Gunby (surname) =

Gunby is a surname. Notable people with the surname include:

- John Gunby (1745–1807), American planter and soldier
- Peter Gunby (1934–2022), British footballer and coach
- Steve Gunby (born 1984), British footballer
- Trish Gunby, American politician
