= Glyn Garner =

Welsh footballer (born 1976)

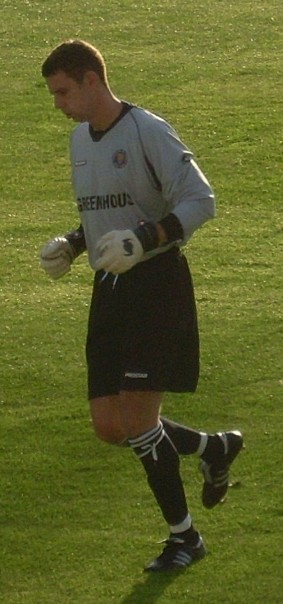
- Garner in 2008

Personal information
- Date of birth: 9 December 1976 (age 49)
- Place of birth: Pontypool, Wales
- Position: Goalkeeper

Senior career*
Years	Team	Apps	(Gls)
1996–1997	Cwmbran Town	2	(0)
1999–2000	Llanelli	28	(0)
2000–2005	Bury	126	(0)
2005–2007	Leyton Orient	86	(0)
2007–2010	Shrewsbury Town	45	(0)
2010	Grays Athletic	12	(0)
2010–2011	Newport County	9	(0)
2011–2013	Bath City	49	(0)
2013–2016	Cirencester Town	128	(0)
2016–2017	Merthyr Town		
2017	→ Cirencester Town (loan)	15	(0)
2017	Goytre		
2017–2018	Croesyceiliog		
2018–2020	Taff's Well		

International career
2006	Wales	1	(0)
- * Club domestic league appearances and goals

Glyn Garner (born 9 December 1976) is a Welsh former professional footballer who played as a goalkeeper. He made one appearance for the Wales national team in 2006.

== Club career ==
Born in Pontypool, Garner started his career at Cwmbran Town before moving to Llanelli.

In 2000, he joined Bury for £5000, where he played over 140 games over five seasons. He turned down a new contract with Bury and joined east London side Leyton Orient in May 2005 on a two-year contract. Manager Martin Ling described him as "a big, commanding goalkeeper who is widely rated as one of the best in the lower divisions." He went on to make nearly 100 appearances for Orient. A particular highlight came when Orient knocked Premier League club Fulham out of the 2005-06 FA Cup, a game in which Garner saved a penalty from Collins John to help his side progress.

In May 2007, Garner turned down an extended contract at Leyton Orient to join League Two side Shrewsbury Town as their first choice goalkeeper. However, injuries led to Garner falling down the pecking order and having not played for the first team since November 2008, he left the club in January 2010 after reaching a financial agreement over the rest of his contract. He joined Grays Athletic in February 2010 on a free transfer. Garner was released at the end of the 2009–10 season, and subsequently joined Newport County on 15 July 2010. In May 2011 he signed for Bath City. After making a total of 57 appearances Garner left Bath in January 2013.

He then signed for Southern League South & West Division side Cirencester Town. He made his debut for the club on 12 January 2013 in a 2–2 draw against Cinderford Town. After ending the 2012–13 season with Cirencester he agreed to remain at the club for the 2013–14 campaign. He left Cirencester Town in January 2016 after 151 appearances (including 51 clean sheets) citing the travel involved as his reason. His final game was a 3 nil victory against Stratford Town. He helped the club to promotion as Southern League South & West Division champions and in May 2014 was named Supporters Player of the Year at the Gloucestershire club.

In January 2016, Garner left Cirencester to sign for Merthyr Town. He returned to Cirencester in 2017 on loan, before departing Merthyr at the end of the 2016–17 season.

In August 2017, Garner joined Goytre.

He then played for Croesyceiliog.

Garner played for Taff's Well for the 2018–19 season.

== International career ==
Garner has been selected in the Wales national team on two occasions and won an international cap against Trinidad and Tobago in May 2006.

== Personal life ==
Garner holds a BA Honours in Sports and Leisure Management, having graduated from Swansea Metropolitan University in 1999. He was brought up in Pontypool's neighbouring town of Cwmbran. Garner's idol is Neville Southall and he supports Everton because of this. His move to Newport County in 2010 was also a personal one for Garner, having attended County matches as a supporter at Somerton Park in his early years.

== Honours ==
Cirencester Town

- Southern League Division One South & West: 2013–14

Individual

- Bury Player of the Season: 2003–04
- Cirencester Town Player of the Season: 2013–14
