= John Cartledge (footballer) =

English footballer

Personal information
- Date of birth: 27 November 1984 (age 41)
- Place of birth: Carshalton, England
- Position: Centre half

Team information
- Current team: Sutton United

Senior career*
Years	Team	Apps	(Gls)
2003–2005	Bury	16	(1)
2005–2008	Carshalton Athletic	83	(1)
2008	Whyteleafe		
2008–2009	Leatherhead		
2009–2010	Sutton United	2	(0)
2010	→ Metropolitan Police (loan)		
- * Club domestic league appearances and goals as of 16/2/2010

John Cartledge (born 27 November 1984) is an English semi-professional footballer who plays for Isthmian League Premier Division side Sutton United.

== Career ==
=== Bury ===
Cartledge came through the youth ranks from Birmingham City before arriving at Gigg Lane. He started seven games for Bury in his debut season in 2003–04, scoring one goal. In 2004–05 Cartledge was limited to one starting appearance and four as substitute. He was released by Bury in November 2005.

=== Carshalton Athletic ===
Cartledge was signed up on a free transfer by Carshalton Athletic in the Conference South in November 2005. He went on to make 25 league appearances in the 2005–06 season for The Robins, and was voted Player of the Year. Carshalton were relegated to the Isthmian League for 2006–07 and Cartledge appeared in 37 league games. The following season, he featured in six games, scoring once, but injury problems plagued his season and he was released by Robins manager Hayden Bird in January 2008.

=== Whyteleafe & Leatherhead ===
He signed for Isthmian League Division One side Whyteleafe in January 2008. Cartledge played out the 2007–08 season with The Leafe before joining local Surrey rivals Leatherhead. He was the captain for the Mole Valley outfit in the 2008–09 season, however he left The Tanners in the summer of 2009, joining Isthmian League Premier Division side Sutton United.

=== Sutton United ===
Cartledge played the autumn in the Sutton reserves, who are in the Suburban Football League. In January, he made his first-team debut in the league win over Tonbridge Angels. Cartledge was loaned to Metropolitan Police in the spring of 2010, and recalled to United for the Surrey Senior Cup quarter-final away at Croydon Athletic in April. He was injured in the first half of the game.
