= Lee Connell =

English footballer

Personal information
- Full name: Lee Anthony Connell
- Date of birth: 24 June 1981 (age 45)
- Place of birth: Bury, England
- Positions: Defender; midfielder

Team information
- Current team: Ramsbottom United

Senior career*
Years	Team	Apps	(Gls)
2000–2004	Bury	58	(9)
2004	Bacup Borough	?	(?)
2004–2005	Leigh RMI	7	(1)
2005–2007	Prestwich Heys	68	(35)
2007–2009	Radcliffe Borough	?	(?)
2009–	Ramsbottom United	55	(12)
- * Club domestic league appearances and goals

Lee Anthony Connell (born 24 June 1981) is an English professional footballer who plays as a midfielder for Ramsbottom United. He played for Bury in the Football League.
