= Giampaolo Pozzo =

Italian businessman (born 1941)

- Born: 25 May 1941 (age 85); Udine, Kingdom of Italy
- Occupation: Businessman
- Known for: Owner of Udinese

Giampaolo Pozzo (born 25 May 1941) is an Italian businessman, currently the owner of Udinese in Italy. His son Gino is the owner of Watford in England. Pozzo sold the family business, tool maker Freud, to Robert Bosch in 2008.

== Udinese Calcio ==
Pozzo bought Udinese in July 1986, but after a betting scandal, the team was demoted to the second-tier Serie B. The club then suffered a nine-point deduction in the Serie A championship of 1986–87 season after winning promotion, ultimately leading to another relegation despite the acquisition of several prominent players, including Francesco Graziani, Fulvio Collovati and Daniel Bertoni.

After a poor season in 1987–88, Pozzo retained Nedo Sonetti as Udinese coach, making several prominent team signings, such as Antonio De Vitis, Giuseppe Minaudo, Angelo Orlando, Settimio Lucci, Antonio Paganin, Zennoni, Giuseppe Catalano, Marco Branca and Claudio Garella. The reinforced squad subsequently earned promotion for the 1988–89 Serie A season.

In 1990, a phone call between Pozzo and the president of Lazio just before a match was alleged to be conclusive proof of match-fixing efforts. Despite a robust defence, Pozzo was banned from holding authority at Udinese, though he remained the club's owner.

In 1993–94, Pozzo's son Gino joined the club, organizing the scouting network.

Since the 1994–95 season, Udinese has qualified for the UEFA Cup, Intertoto Cup and Champions League and finished third in serie A under Alberto Zaccheroni in 1997–98.

The Udinese model is based upon an extensive scouting network across the world that buys young and upcoming talent for relatively small sums and when they turn into stars, sell them on for a large profit which is then reinvested in the club and other signings. Prominent examples include Márcio Amoroso, Fabio Quagliarella, Alexis Sánchez, Kwadwo Asamoah and Samir Handanović.

In 2007–08, Pozzo was voted the best president in Serie A.

After Pallacanestro Amatori Udine, better known as Snaidero Udine, was demoted to the minor leagues, Pozzo helped his friend Edy Snaidero, majority shareholder of the basketball team. Pozzo and some other entrepreneurs from Friuli saved Snaidero which restarted playing in Lega Basket Serie A2 championship.

== Granada ==
In 2009, Pozzo purchased Spanish club Granada selling it on 16 June 2016 to Chinese businessman, Jiang Lizhang.

== Watford ==
In June 2012, he acquired Watford from previous owner Laurence Bassini. Over time he has invested heavily in the club, including sending over multiple players from his other teams Granada and Udinese. Some of these players include Almen Abdi, Matěj Vydra and Gabriele Angella.

As well as sending multiple players over from his other clubs, he signed a £18 million maintenance deal in 2014 to renovate their stadium, Vicarage Road. The renovation started in 2015 and was completed by 2017, and included a new stand, named after former club chairman Elton John.

In 2014, Pozzo also handed over ownership and running of the club to his son Gino, who is based in London.
