= Gareth Seddon =

English footballer

Personal information
- Full name: Gareth Jon Seddon
- Date of birth: 23 May 1980 (age 46)
- Place of birth: Burnley, England
- Position: Striker

Senior career*
Years	Team	Apps	(Gls)
2001–2004	Bury	80	(18)
2003	→ Northwich Victoria (loan)	1	(0)
2004–2005	Rushden & Diamonds	0	(0)
2005–2006	Padiham	?	(18)
2006	Worcester City	1	(1)
2006–2008	Hyde United	75	(52)
2008–2009	Kettering Town	46	(32)
2009–2012	Fleetwood Town	98	(26)
2012–2013	FC Halifax Town	32	(24)
2013–2014	Chester	35	(7)
2014–2016	Salford City	60	(26)
2016–2017	Ramsbottom United	23	(17)

International career^{‡}
2007	England C	2	(2)
- * Club domestic league appearances and goals as of 10:33, 3 September 2016 (UTC) ‡ National team caps and goals as of 24 May 2011

Gareth Jonathan Seddon (born 23 May 1980) is an English footballer who played as a striker. He played 80 games in the Football League for Bury.

== Career ==
=== Early career ===
Seddon was a fitness instructor in the RAF when he came close to joining Reading in 2001. When he failed to win a deal with the Berkshire club Gareth still chose to quit the forces in order to begin a football career at Bury. While at Bury he scored the club's 6000th goal. He was Bury's leading scorer in the 2001–02 season with eight goals but made just a handful of appearances in the next season, and joined Northwich Victoria on loan in January 2003. After three seasons at Bury, in the last of which he again finished as leading scorer, he rejected a new deal and instead joined Rushden & Diamonds on a Bosman free transfer in 2004. However Seddon was plagued by the onset of reactive arthritis, a condition brought on by the rigours of full-time training. He never gained fitness to play for his new team and doctors advised him to retire from the professional game.

During his time out of the game he also taught football part-time at St Theodore's RC High School in Burnley, a school which he himself had attended. In 2005, he returned to football and completed an entire season with North West Counties League side Padiham. This extended break from the professional game allowed Seddon to recuperate and by March 2006 the illness had left his system. He joined up with his former Bury manager Andy Preece at Worcester City and played one match for the team on a non-contract basis in April 2006, scoring in a 3–2 win against Stalybridge Celtic. He was set to sign for the Midlands team and agreed personal terms but baulked at the distance he would have to commute from his Accrington home.

=== Hyde United ===
Despite interest from several fully professional Conference National clubs such as Morecambe, Seddon chose to continue his recuperation at part-time level and joined Hyde United in the summer of 2006. Seddon has gained a reputation for scoring spectacular goals and on 1 January 2007 scored 5 goals in a 7–3 local derby win away at Stalybridge Celtic. This achievement won him the Hyde United Magic Moment of the Season award along with the Fans' and Players' Player of the Season titles during his first year with the club.

During the summer of 2007 Gareth was called up to the England National Game squad for the Four Nations Tournament. He won his first cap against the Republic of Ireland, then scored twice in a 3–0 win over Wales. Seddon scored 62 goals in 87 appearances for Hyde over the two seasons, winning the Conference North golden boot in both.

=== Kettering Town ===
In July 2008 he joined Conference National side Kettering Town on a two-year contract for an undisclosed fee. Seddon was leading scorer with 21 goals in his first season.

=== Fleetwood Town ===
In September 2009, Seddon signed for Conference North outfit Fleetwood Town becoming a regular first team player and helping the club gain promotion to the Conference National in 2010. After promotion Seddon was key in helping the club gain a play-off spot in their first season in the top-flight non-league league where they lost to play-off winners AFC Wimbledon in the semi-finals. In 2011–12 Seddon became one of Fleetwood's top scorers, being a super-sub after scoring several goals from coming on as a substitute. During his time at Fleetwood Seddon played with now England international Jamie Vardy. He was released by the club in May 2012.

=== FC Halifax Town ===
In the summer of 2012, Seddon signed for Conference North side FC Halifax Town, opting to turn part-time and focus on his modelling career instead of going full-time with Luton Town or Macclesfield Town. In a game against Bradford Park Avenue, Seddon scored in the club's 1–1 draw in the West Yorkshire derby, however he was also awarded a red card for an off the ball incident. In the First Round of the FA Trophy Seddon set a new record the fastest hat-trick in an FA Competition, recorded at 2 minutes and 37 seconds. The hat-trick included a fine solo run past the Altrincham defence. Seddon scored his second hat-trick for the club away to Droylsden in February 2013 in a 6–0 victory. Halifax sealed promotion, with a 1-0 win against Brackley in the playoff final.

=== Chester ===
In May 2013 he moved to Chester.

=== Salford City ===
In the summer of 2014 he moved to Salford City. In his first league match for the club he scored a hat-trick . In October 2015 Seddon appeared in the BBC One series Class of '92: Out of Their League.

=== Ramsbottom United ===
After his departure from Salford City, Seddon signed for Ramsbottom United in June 2016. He made his competitive debut for Ramsbottom on the opening day of the season, at home in a 3–1 win against Goole on 13 August 2016. Seddon scored his first goal for the club the following game, in a 2–1 away defeat to Kendal Town 3 days later.

=== Post-playing career ===
Since retiring as a player Seddon has begun working as football agent.
