= Harpal Singh =

English footballer

Personal information
- Date of birth: 15 September 1981 (age 45)
- Place of birth: Bradford, England
- Position: Left winger

Youth career
- Leeds United

Senior career*
Years	Team	Apps	(Gls)
2000–2005	Leeds United	0	(0)
2001	→ Bury (loan)	12	(2)
2002	→ Bristol City (loan)	3	(0)
2002	→ Bradford City (loan)	3	(0)
2003	→ Bury (loan)	17	(1)
2004	→ Bury (loan)	11	(1)
2005–2006	Stockport County	30	(1)
2006	Sligo Rovers	9	(3)
2007–2008	Bohemians	10	(0)
2009	Dundalk	12	(0)
- * Club domestic league appearances and goals

Harpal Singh (born 15 September 1981) is an English former professional footballer. During his career he played for various clubs including Leeds United, Stockport County, Sligo Rovers, Bohemians and Dundalk.

== Career ==
Singh was born in Bradford, England. Although he started out with Leeds United, he made his professional debut when he went to play for Bury at Wrexham during his loan spell for Bury. He also played for Bristol City and Bradford City and twice more at Bury, all on loan, before he moved to Stockport County in 2005. Singh's favourite position was on the left wing. In 2006, he was released by County manager Jim Gannon to sign for Sligo Rovers. He scored once for Stockport, in a 4–2 win over Northampton.

In January 2007, Singh signed for Bohemians, but spent the majority of his time at Dalymount Park on the sidelines with injury. He did score against Rhyl in the 2008 UEFA Intertoto Cup. However, after being a bit-part player in Bohs' Double winning season of 2008, he was released by the club when his contract expired in December 2008. In January 2009, he linked up with his former manager Sean Connor to join newly promoted Dundalk and signed a six-month contract; he was released after his contract was up, becoming a PE teacher at Kingsway Park High School in Rochdale.

== See also ==
- British Asians in association football
