= Laurence Bassini =

English businessman (born 1970)

- Born: Laurence Bazini; 8 April 1970 (age 55)
- Occupation: Businessman

Laurence Bassini (born Laurence Bazini) is an English businessman. He was the chairman of Watford Football Club from May 2011 to June 2012.

== Business career ==
=== Watford ===
Bassini bought Watford Football Club in a £440,000 takeover on 31 May 2011, when the club's previous parent company Watford Leisure PLC was de-listed from the London Stock Exchange and became Watford Leisure Limited.

Prior to taking over at Watford, Bassini had been made bankrupt in 2007, following the failure of his business The Fox at Ibstone near High Wycombe, Buckinghamshire. Bassini was bankrupt for about a year and it was during this time that he changed his name to "Bassini" to have a "fresh start".

Whilst chairman of Watford, Bassini had been due to meet with fans at the annual Fans Forum on 8 November 2011, but cancelled at the last minute citing ill health. He then cancelled a subsequent local radio phone-in on 22 November 2011, again at the last minute and again due to "ill health".

Bassini's tenure at Watford was marked by allegations of financial impropriety, culminating in the "Safegate" scandal, when just prior to the sale of the club in June 2012, Bassini called the police after an employee refused to hand him the keys to the club safe. He regularly wore a red builder's helmet when giving interviews to the local paper.

In June 2012, 13 months after he bought the club, Bassini sold Watford to Gino Pozzo, son of Giampaolo Pozzo and owner of Udinese and Granada.

In November 2012, it was announced the £1.5 million Bassini owed to Watford for "cash advances" was unlikely to be repaid.

In March 2013, an independent disciplinary commission found Bassini guilty of misconduct and dishonesty over financial dealings on behalf of Watford, and banned him from being involved in a position of authority with any Football League club for three years. The commission found he had been "dishonest in his dealings with the league and with his fellow directors" and "practised secrecy and deception" when he told neither the league nor the other members of the Watford board about his secret forward financing arrangements.

Following Watford's defeat to Crystal Palace in the 2013 Football League Championship play-off final, Bassini sent a series of gloating texts to local newspaper Watford Observer, reveling in his joy at their loss.

In July 2013, The High Court ordered his company Watford Leisure Limited be placed in liquidation.

In March 2014, Bassini lost a High Court battle against the Russo brothers. The former Watford directors claimed that they were owed more than £3.5 million by Bassini. He was ordered to pay £3.5 million and £135,000 (plus an additional £568,000 in interest and £150k in costs); a total of £4,353,000. During the trial, in which he was described as "evasive" and a maker of "empty threats", the court heard Bassini had made numerous accusations of conspiracies against him without providing any evidence. Among these were that the Russos still secretly owned half Watford with the Pozzo family and were orchestrating a campaign against him. Bassini, who had been in court for the whole trial, left before the end after complaining of "feeling dizzy" following "a slip" on the High Court steps.

In June 2014, Bassini was made bankrupt for the second time. The bankruptcy order was made after Bassini failed to pay £37,500. During the hearing Bassini claimed not to own any property despite receiving over £1.5 million in cash advances from Watford during his tenure.

=== Bolton Wanderers ===
On 17 April 2019, it was announced that Bassini had agreed to take over EFL Championship club Bolton Wanderers. On 7 May, it was reported Bassini's takeover was on the "brink of collapse" after a repeated failure to provide proof of funds to the English Football League. On 8 August 2019, Bassini won a court order blocking the sale of Bolton Wanderers to Football Ventures. His efforts, however, were eventually unsuccessful, with Football Ventures securing the completion of the sale on 28 August 2019.

=== Charlton Athletic ===
In May 2020, it was revealed Bassini had a provisional agreement to buy Charlton Athletic for £1.2 million. However, he pulled out of the deal on May 27 due to problems stemming from Roland Duchatelet owning The Valley and Charlton's Training Ground. He instead decided to look into taking legal action against Bolton in an attempt to unravel their takeover and gain control of the club as it was revealed he had in fact officially owned Inner Circle Investments, the company that owned Bolton Wanderers at the time, after Ken Anderson had agreed to sell the club to him.

=== Birmingham City ===
In November 2021, it was reported he was interested in buying Birmingham City for £27m. Further articles about his interest in purchasing Birmingham City were reported in the press in June 2022, stating he had exchanged contracts with regards to taking a 30% stake in Birmingham City in a staged deal.
