= Lee Unsworth =

English footballer

Personal information
- Full name: Lee Peter Unsworth
- Date of birth: 25 February 1973 (age 53)
- Place of birth: Eccles, Lancashire, England
- Position: Defender

Senior career*
Years	Team	Apps	(Gls)
1994–1995	Ashton United	?	(?)
1995–2000	Crewe Alexandra	124	(0)
2000–2006	Bury	151	(6)
2006	Hyde United	5	(0)
2006–2008	Leigh RMI		
2008	Chorley		
2008–2010	Radcliffe Borough		
- * Club domestic league appearances and goals

Lee Peter Unsworth (born 25 February 1973) in Eccles, Lancashire is a former footballer who played as a defender in the Football League in the 1990s and 2000s.

== Playing career ==
He began his career with Ashton United, before signing for Crewe Alexandra of the Football League. He made his Crewe debut against Wycombe Wanderers on the opening day of the 1995–96 season, with his debut goal following 11 days later in a League Cup match against Darlington.

He played over 150 senior games for them before moving to Bury on a free transfer in July 2000. He played 175 senior games for Bury before leaving the club in March 2006. He moved to Hyde United for the latter part of the 2005−06 season.

Unsworth joined Leigh RMI in October 2006. In January 2008, he signed for Northern Premier League Division One North club Chorley. He was signed by Radcliffe Borough in August 2008. He made 11 appearances for Radcliffe in the 2009–10 season before leaving the club.

== Coaching career ==
Unsworth joined Manchester United as an academy coach in August 2009. He is the current coach of the under-12s.

== Honours ==
Crewe Alexandra

- Football League Second Division play-offs: 1997
