= Simon Blitz =

English businessman (c. 1520–1601)

- Occupation: businessman

Simon Blitz is an English businessman who is the former chairman of Oldham Athletic of Football League One. He is one of three businessmen who purchased Oldham in 2003, along with Simon Corney and Danny Gazal. On 7 July 2010, he stepped down as chairman of Oldham, along with Gazal, citing personal and economic reasons for his departure. Corney took over as chairman following his resignation. Blitz is quoted in a BBC Sport article about the matter:

"I don't feel I'm able to give the supporters the contribution they are looking for in the future Last season I invested a further substantial amount of money into the club and with reduced income from season ticket sales this summer, the demands on me were becoming too great. I have met lots of nice people and enjoyed my time, but have found it a constant battle and uphill struggle in more recent times."

Both Blitz and Gazal were founders of Cellular Network Communications Group, an American-based mobile phone company. Corney would later join as a partner.

On 13 February 2019, it was announced that Trust Oldham was part of a fan-led group looking to purchase Boundary Park from Blitz which is a move towards an end to his involvement with the football club.
