= Simon Corney =

Football chairman

Simon Corney is a businessman and the former chairman, director and former owner of English football club Oldham Athletic.

Working in the field of telecommunications in New York City, Corney bought Oldham Athletic in 2004 with colleagues Danny Gazal and Simon Blitz. The football club had been close to liquidation before an investment of funds in 2004. Gazal and Blitz ceased any involvement with the club in 2010.

In 2014, Corney negotiated a sponsorship deal for Oldham's ground, Boundary Park, with sporting retail group SportsDirect.com which resulted in a ground name change to the SportsDirect.com Park.

In 2015, Corney was in controversial discussions to sign footballer and wrongly convicted rapist Ched Evans for Oldham Athletic. Evans at the time was in prison for the offence but the conviction was later quashed in the Court of Appeal.
