= Steve Gunby =

English footballer

Personal information
- Full name: Stephen Robert Gunby
- Date of birth: 14 April 1984 (age 42)
- Place of birth: Lincoln, England
- Height: 5 ft 11 in (1.80 m)
- Position: Midfielder

Senior career*
Years	Team	Apps	(Gls)
2002–2004	Bury	6	(0)
2003	→ Hyde United (loan)	9	(0)
2004	Leigh RMI	10	(0)
2004–2006	Biddulph Victoria	?	(?)
2006–2007	Airbus UK	10	(0)
Total		35	(0)
- * Club domestic league appearances and goals

Stephen Robert Gunby (born 14 April 1984, in Lincoln, England) is a retired professional footballer who played as a midfielder for Bury in the Football League.
