= Paul O'Shaughnessy (footballer) =

English footballer

Paul Joseph O'Shaughnessy
Personal information
- Full name: Paul Joseph O'Shaughnessy
- Date of birth: 3 October 1981 (age 45)
- Place of birth: Bury, England
- Position: Midfielder

Senior career*
| Years | Team | Apps | (Gls) |
| 1998–2004 | Bury | 45 | (1) |
| 2005 | Radcliffe Borough | 2 | (1) |
| 2008–2010 | North Sydney | 78 | (18) |
| 2010–2014 | Dunbar Rovers | | (1) |
- * Club domestic league appearances and goals

Paul Joseph O'Shaughnessy (born 3 October 1981) in Bury, England, is an English professional footballer, who played as a midfielder for Bury. Moving to Sydney, Australia he played for North Sydney and Dunbar Rovers.

On 13 August 2019, O'Shaughnessy and his brothers Lee and Luke, witnessed and filmed a man wielding a knife who had just stabbed a woman in the 2019 Sydney stabbing attack.

== Career ==
He played as a midfielder for Bury in the Football League. In 2009, O'Shaughnessy signed for Australian outfit North Sydney, before moving to play for Dunbar Rovers.
