= Oldham Athletic A.F.C. =

Football club in Greater Manchester, England

Oldham Athletic
- Full name: Oldham Athletic Association Football Club
- Nickname: Latics
- Founded: 4 July 1895; 131 years ago (as Pine Villa F.C.)
- Ground: Boundary Park
- Capacity: 13,560
- Chairman: Frank Rothwell
- Manager: Micky Mellon
- League: EFL League Two
- 2025–26: EFL League Two, 10th of 24
- Website: oldhamathletic.co.uk
Home colours	Away colours	Third colours

Oldham Athletic Association Football Club is a professional association football club in Oldham, Greater Manchester, England. As of the 2026-27 season, the team competes in EFL League Two, the fourth level of the English football league system.

The history of Oldham Athletic began with the founding of Pine Villa F.C. in 1895, the team played in the Manchester and Lancashire leagues. When the local team Oldham County folded in 1899, Pine Villa moved into Boundary Park and changed their name to Oldham Athletic A.F.C.. They won the Lancashire Combination league title in 1906–07 and were elected into the Football League. They won promotion out of the Second Division in 1909–10 and went on to finish second in the First Division in 1914–15, before being relegated in 1923. Another relegation in 1935 left them in the Third Division North, which they won at the end of the 1952–53 campaign, only to be relegated back the following season. Placed in the Fourth Division, they secured promotion in 1962–63, and again in 1970–71 after another relegation in 1969.

One of their successful managers, Jimmy Frizzell was at the club from 1970 to 1982. During his tenure with the team, Oldham won the Third Division title in 1973–74. Frizzell was succeeded by another successful manager in Joe Royle, who was also in charge for 12 years. During his spell as manager, Oldham reached the League Cup final in 1990. They then won the Second Division title in 1990–91, which meant that Oldham played in the top flight for the first time in 68 years and became founder members of the newly created Premier League in 1992. They were relegated in 1994 and fell to the third tier by 1997, ending a 21-season stay within the top two tiers. Their time in the Second Division/League One encompassed numerous financial crises, eventually culminating in relegation to EFL League Two in 2018. At the end of the 2021–22 season, relegation from League Two was confirmed and the club fell into the National League, becoming the first former Premier League club to play non-League football. They returned to the Football League after winning the 2025 National League play-off final.

They play home matches at their stadium of Boundary Park. Known to fans as the "Latics", Oldham traditionally play in blue shirts. The club contest numerous local rivalries, most notably with Rochdale, Bolton Wanderers and Huddersfield Town, the latter of which is known as the Roses derby.

== History ==
=== Early history ===
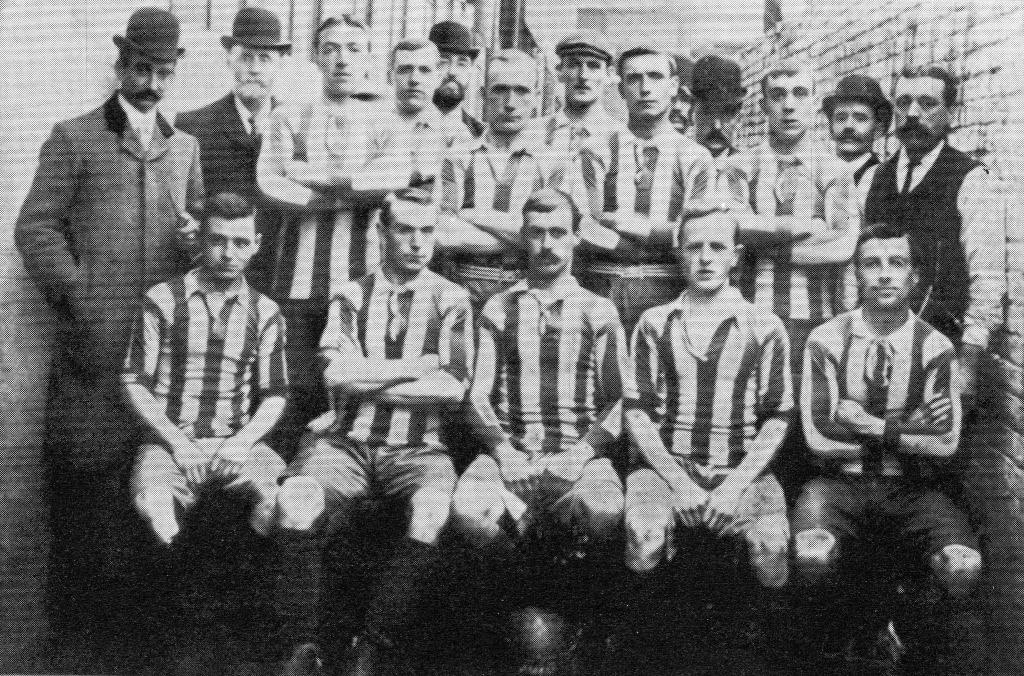
Oldham Athletic in 1905

In July 1895, licensee John Garland with his son formed a football club named Pine Villa Football Club with a group of friends inside the Featherstall & Junction Inn. The club was initially named after the Pine Mill whose shadow the club played in. The term "Villa" originated from Aston Villa's dominance of the football league at the time of formation. The club changed its appearance and name in 1899 to Oldham Athletic Football Club when nearby team, Oldham County folded. (Note: Athletic moved in to County's ex-stadium, Boundary Park.) The club immediately gained professional status and played in both the Lancashire Combination and Lancashire League. Unlike many clubs, Oldham Athletic gained quick success and gained acceptance into the Football League in 1907–08. After three years in the Second Division, Latics gained promotion to the First Division.

Within a couple of seasons, Oldham had announced themselves serious contenders, finishing 4th in the league in 1912–13, and reaching the F.A. Cup semi-finals the same season, losing out 1–0 versus Aston Villa. In 1914–15, Latics reached the quarter-finals of the FA Cup but were knocked out once again after a 0–3 replay against Sheffield United. In the league that season Latics almost won it all, losing by one point – as close as they have ever come to winning the league. Latics' early success was halted by the First World War.

=== Interwar struggles ===
Following the return of competitive football after the First World War, Oldham Athletic struggled to find their early success before they returned to the Second Division in 1923. It would be another 68 years before they played top division football again.

Many of the players from their former squads had either retired from football or been killed in the war. Their highest success came in the 1929–30 season as they finished in 3rd, missing out on promotion by finishing two points behind Chelsea. From then on they slowly but surely fell down the league table, until a final placing of 21st at the end of the 1934–35 season saw them relegated to the Third Division North. They found life in this new division much more to their liking, coming 7th in their first season and following this with three seasons in the top five. Promotion back to the Second Division looked like it might just be a possibility, but the outbreak of the Second World War in 1939 brought an end to League Football. Players' contracts were terminated, and relying largely on guest players, the club was to play in the war-time Northern League until August 1946.

=== Post-war plight ===
Chart of yearly table positions since Oldham joined the Football League.

Following the return of competitive football there was to be no immediate success for Oldham Athletic. They finished 19th in the first league season after the war and manager Frank Womack resigned. In spite of reaching a more respectable 6th place under his successor Billy Wooton in 1949, it wasn't until the appointment of George Hardwick as player-manager in November 1950 that the club found any real form.

Hardwick's appointment came at a cost, with a £15,000 transfer fee paid to Middlesbrough. This was a huge amount at the time, especially for a third division club, but it was to stir up the town and its fans, who now looked forward to seeing a man who had been captain of England only two years previously in charge of its club's fortunes. In Hardwick's first full season in charge they finished 4th after topping the table for a considerable time. Home gates stayed high, with an amazing 33,450 watching a 1–0 win over local rivals Stockport County in March 1952. After a January game in the snow the team had established a new club scoring record when Chester were beaten 11–2. Eric Gemmell scored seven of these to establish an individual club record for one game which still stands to date. The season after, Oldham Athletic proudly finished champions of the division and won promotion to the Second Division. With an ageing squad and little money to recruit, however, the season that followed was a massive disappointment. Only eight games were won, Oldham finished in last place and quickly returned to the Third Division North, where a first equally disappointing season saw them finish no higher than 10th.

Hardwick resigned in 1955 and between then and 1960, they continued to struggle, finishing below the top 20 on three occasions. With a 15th-place finish in 1958–59, Oldham became a founding member of a newly formed Fourth Division. In the following season they finished in the 23rd position – their lowest position in the entire League, and had to apply for reelection, which they passed as the League chose to drop Gateshead, who had finished above them, in favour of newcomers Peterborough United.

Ken Bates entered the picture at Oldham Athletic in the early 1960s (where he was chairman for 5 years), and along with the appointment of manager Jack Rowley, the club's fortunes turned for the better. During the 1962–63 season, Oldham Athletic again gained promotion to the Third Division as Rowley left as manager. Over the next six seasons, Oldham struggled with consistency in the league and at the manager position, with Les McDowall, Gordon Hurst and Jimmy McIlroy all spending time at the managerial position.

In the 1968–69, Jack Rowley once more returned as manager. With their inconsistency, Rowley and Bates could not save the club from a last-place finish and inevitable relegation. Midway through the 1969–70 season, Rowley and Bates both left the club as Jimmy Frizzell became Latics manager, a position he held for the next 13 seasons.

=== Frizzell and Royle eras ===
In the 1970–71 season, Oldham saw their best result since 1962–63 as they finished in third place, earning promotion back to the Third Division. After a mid-table finish in their first season, Latics missed out on promotion, finishing in fourth place, seven points behind local rivals and league champions Bolton Wanderers. In the 1973–74 season, Latics finished in 1st place and returned to the Second Division for the first time in 21 years. Oldham's trip back to the Second Division was far more successful than their previous visit. During Frizzell's remaining time at the club, Latics remained in the Second Division, but with little FA Cup and Football League Cup success.

In June 1982, the club appointed Joe Royle as their manager. Royle's side finished 7th in his first season in charge, but fell to 19th in his second. In the 1986–87 season, Oldham narrowly missed promotion to the First Division finishing three points behind Portsmouth and losing in the inaugural play-offs to (then) local rivals Leeds United, when previous seasons would have seen them automatically promoted.

In 1990 Royle's Latics reached Wembley Stadium in the Littlewoods Cup Final (Note: now the EFL Cup) versus Nottingham Forest, where they lost 1–0. The next season, Oldham did not have the same cup success, but won the Second Division and returned to the First Division for the first time in 68 years. In their first season back in the top flight, the club finished 17th and became founding members of the newly formed Premier League. After two further seasons at the top level, Oldham faced relegation yet again and during the following season, the Joe Royle era came to an end as he left the club and went to manage Everton.

During this era, Oldham Athletic reached the FA Cup semi-finals twice, both times losing to (then) rivals Manchester United after a replay. In 1994 they were less than a minute away from winning 1–0 in extra time when a Mark Hughes equaliser for Manchester United saw the game at Wembley end in a 1–1 draw, and Oldham were beaten 4–1 in the replay at Maine Road. Many fans of Oldham in the years since have described the last minute equaliser by Hughes as the start of a rivalry with United and decline from which Oldham have never recovered. Oldham failed to win any of their seven remaining league games following the semi-final and were relegated on the final day of the season after a 1–1 draw at Norwich City.

=== 1994–2018: second and third tier struggles ===
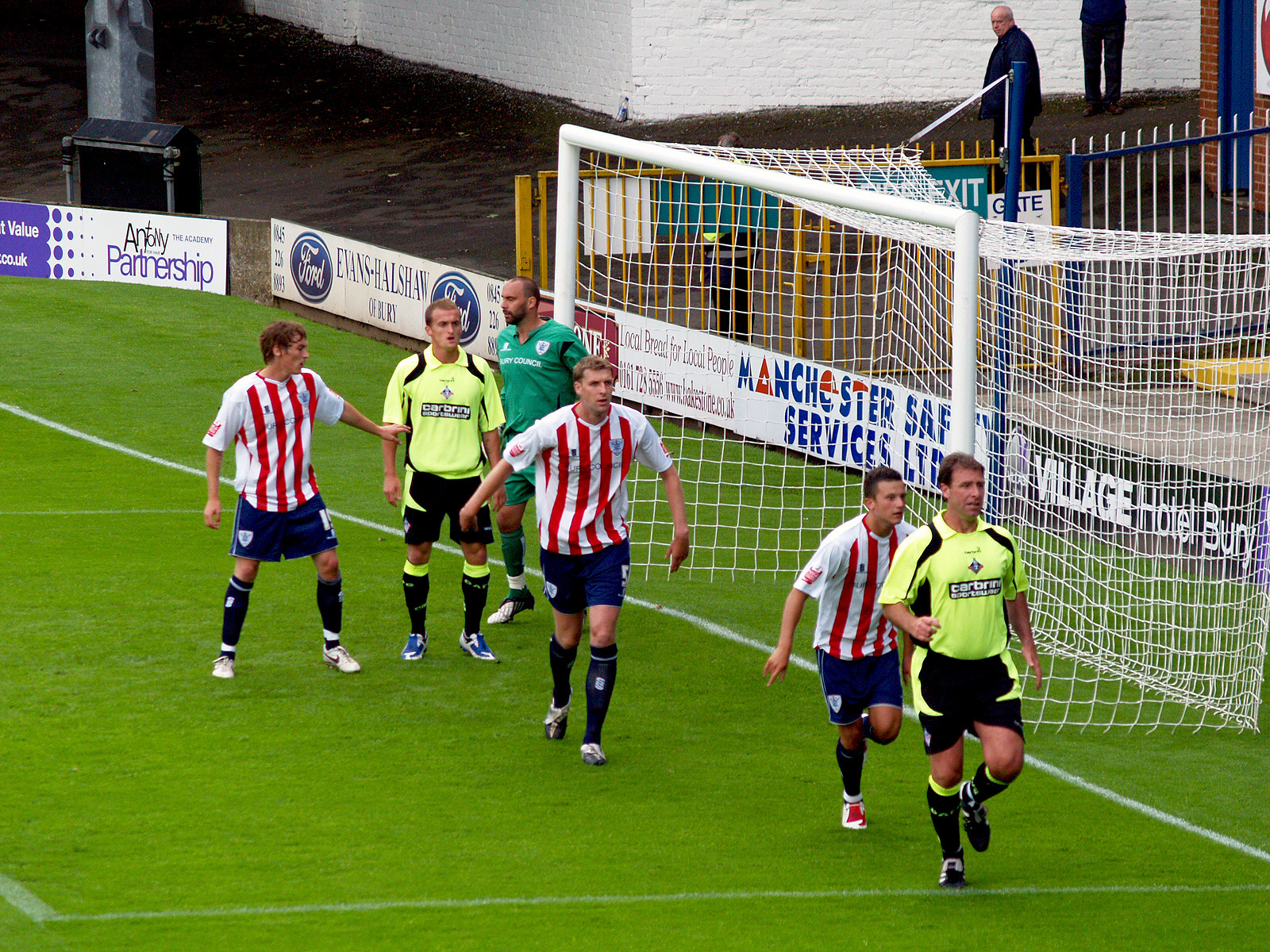
Oldham Athletic (in yellow) in a friendly match against Bury during the 2009–10 season

Graeme Sharp took over as Oldham's player-manager on the departure of Joe Royle in November 1994, but he was unable to mount a promotion challenge and the pressure continued to build up a year later when Oldham narrowly avoided relegation. Relegation to Division Two happened at the end of the 1996–97 season, just after Sharp had resigned to be succeeded by Neil Warnock.

As one of the biggest clubs in Division Two for 1997–98, and being managed by Warnock who had achieved no less than five promotions with other clubs in the last 11 years, Oldham Athletic were tipped for an immediate return to Division One, but they finished a disappointing 13th in the league and Warnock resigned. Oldham would ultimately stay in the third tier for 21 years. Veteran striker Andy Ritchie took over as player-manager, but he too failed to mount a promotion challenge and was sacked in October 2001 to be succeeded by Mick Wadsworth.

In 2001, Oxford-based businessman Chris Moore purchased Oldham Athletic, vowing to take the club back to Premier League football within five years. Wadsworth quit as manager in the summer of 2002 to make way for Iain Dowie, who transformed Oldham's fortunes on the pitch as they made their first serious challenge for promotion in Division Two. Oldham finished fifth and their promotion dreams were ended in the playoffs, and their fans were furious when Moore decided to end his interest with the club, leaving behind large debts and a weak squad, and after selling the better players at a fraction of their market value at the time. For a while, it looked as though the club would go out of business, but a takeover deal was soon completed.

In 2004–05, Simon Blitz and two other partners, Simon Corney and Danny Gazal, purchased Oldham Athletic, trying to rescue the club from possible liquidation. While trying to repay debts, Oldham struggled for several seasons, barely avoiding relegation once more in 2004–05. In 2006–07, Oldham's fortune turned for the better once more as the club narrowly missed out on promotion, losing to Blackpool 5–2 on aggregate in the play-off semi-final. After two years with the club, manager John Sheridan was sacked on 15 March 2009, immediately being replaced by former manager Royle. After being offered the job on a permanent basis, Royle rejected the proposal and announced that he would be leaving the club after the final game of the season. Darlington boss Dave Penney was announced as Royle's successor on 30 April. Penney was dismissed as Oldham manager on 6 May 2010, with his assistant, Martin Gray, taking over as caretaker manager for the final game of season 2009–10. During June 2010, Paul Dickov was named as Oldham Athletic player-manager signing a one-year contract. On 3 February 2013, he left his role as manager despite having knocked Liverpool out of the FA Cup the previous week.

On 18 March 2013, the club hired Lee Johnson to become the next manager; at the time of his appointment, he was the youngest manager in the Football League at 31. The club narrowly avoided relegation for the 2012–13 season, finishing 19th and just three points above the drop zone. The club fared better in Johnson's second season, finishing mid-table at 15th.

In January 2015, it was reported that Oldham was attempting to sign Ched Evans, an accused rapist. The move faced a significant public backlash, including from politicians, while a petition against the signing gained 60,000 signatures and Verlin Rainwater Solutions withdrew club sponsorship. Oldham ultimately decided not to sign Evans due to "unbearable pressure" while condemning the "vile and abusive threats, some including death threats, which have been made to our fans, sponsors and staff".

In January 2018, Moroccan football agent Abdallah Lemsagam agreed a deal with the club's majority shareholder Corney, ending his 14-year association with Oldham. Gazal and Blitz had left in 2010, with Corney staying as the majority shareholder. Lemsagam owned 97% of the club, while the Supporters' Trust maintained a 3% stake. The takeover did not include Boundary Park's North Stand, which the club did not own but could use on match days. In the two years prior to the Lemsagam deal, Oldham had faced a number of winding-up orders for non-payment of its tax bills, and saw its ground raided by HMRC in November 2017.

=== 2018–present: decline, relegation from and return to the Football League ===
Oldham were relegated to League Two on 5 May 2018 due to Lemsagam's poor ownership. They had not been in the fourth tier since 1971. The club faced further HMRC winding-up petitions in late 2019 and early 2020. Former owner Blitz sought to put the club into administration on 6 March 2020 because of debts owed to his company, Brass Bank, which owned Boundary Park, but the case was adjourned to 21 April after a "significant" proportion of the debt was paid, as was Oldham's tax debt to HMRC. One-time Watford owner Laurence Bassini was reported to be interested in buying the club, but this was labelled as "false" during the 6 March hearing.

Former Australia international Harry Kewell took over as Oldham manager in August, at the start of the 2020–21 season and recorded 11 wins, six draws and 15 defeats before he was sacked by the club in March 2021. He left the club 10 points above the relegation places; some fans regarded the club's decision as premature given that Oldham had recently beaten promotion challengers Newport County, Forest Green Rovers and Salford City. Keith Curle stepped in as temporary head coach, and made the move permanent in May 2021, but his efforts to build a stronger squad were hampered by an EFL transfer embargo, COVID-19 illness, and fans protests against the club's owner.

On 7 September, with the club in 23rd position in the fourth tier, Lemsagam insisted he did not wish to sell his stake. Curle left Oldham in November. In December 2021 Lemsagam announced he was willing to sell the club amid accusations of late payment of salaries, threats of player strikes, and concerns about administration. Sheridan was re-appointed as manager in January 2022, but could not halt the slide towards the National League. With two games still to play, Oldham were relegated from the English Football League following a 2–1 home defeat by Salford City on 23 April, a match interrupted by an on-pitch protest by fans against the club's owner. The club became the first former Premier League team to ever drop into non-league football. (Note: The Premier League began in 1992–93; Glossop North End, Luton Town, Carlisle United, Leyton Orient, and Notts County had previously been relegated to non-League football after having played at least one top tier season before 1992–93.)

Following the relegation, the club's supporters' trust started to campaign for a community takeover of the club. On 30 June 2022, after Lemsagam and the Boundary Park owner agreed to a sale, it was reported Oldham Athletic could be sold within the next month to an unnamed local business. On 28 July 2022, it was confirmed that the club had been sold to businessman Frank Rothwell, owner of Oldham-based company Manchester Cabins, and that Oldham were at an advanced stage in negotiations to buy Boundary Park from former owner Simon Blitz – a deal agreed in late August 2022 and eventually completed in March 2023.

Oldham started their first National League campaign with just two wins from their first eight games. Sheridan stepped down as manager on 17 September 2022 following a 3–2 defeat of Eastleigh and was replaced by David Unsworth. The side finished the season in 12th place. Unsworth was sacked on 17 September 2023 after a seven-match winless run before being replaced by Micky Mellon. They returned to the Football League after defeating Southend United 3–2 after extra time in the 2025 National League play-off final.

== Kit and badge ==
Latics originally started out playing in red and white hooped shirts with blue shorts, bearing strong similarities to the Oldham R.L.F.C. colours. The red stripes were eventually replaced with blue, before this was in turn replaced by a white shirt with the blue stripe down the middle. In the mid-1960s, under the ownership of Ken Bates, the strip was changed to tangerine shirts with blue shorts. In the mid-1970s the club adopted an all blue shirt, and these colours have been worn ever since, with the exception of the red and blue hooped shirt that was used the late 1990s. This shirt proved unpopular among supporters and caused kit clashing problems, resulting in opposition teams occasionally having to wear Oldham's away kit. The club brought back the colours from the 1960s as an away kit for the 2007–08 season and this proved to be popular amongst the supporters. A new badge was shown on the new away kit for the 2011–12 season, and was introduced to the home kit for the following season. The badge contains the traditional blue and white colours, however, there is no longer any red visible; there is still an image of an owl, yet it remains on top of a football.

=== Kit suppliers and shirt sponsors ===
Table of kit suppliers and shirt sponsors appear below:

Period	Kit manufacturer	Shirt sponsor (chest)
1975–79	Umbro	none
1979–81	Umbro	Redsure
1981–82	Umbro	none
1982–83	Umbro	J.W. Lees Brewery
1983–85	Le Coq Sportif	J.W. Lees Brewery
1985–87	Spall	J.W. Lees Brewery
1987–88	Umbro	J.W. Lees Brewery
1988–89	Umbro	Martins
1989–92	Umbro	Bovis
1992–96	Umbro	JD Sports
1996–98	Pony	JD Sports
1998–2000	Pony	Slumberland
2000–01	Sparta	Slumberland
2001–03	Sparta	Torex
2003–04	Sparta	Horners
2004–05	Carlotti	Horners
2005–06	Carlotti	Carlotti
2006–08	Carlotti	Hillstone Developments
2008–12	Carbrini	Carbrini
2012–13	Fila	Carbrini
2013–14	Fila	Blacks Outdoor Retail
2014–15	Sondico	Sports Direct
2015–18	Sondico	PFE Express
2018–19	Sondico	Lovell Soccer
2019–20	Hummel	Wakelet
2020–21	Hummel	Oldham Vending Services
2021–23	Hummel	Bartercard
2023–25	Puma	RRG Group
2025–26	Puma	Bunkabin

== Stadium ==
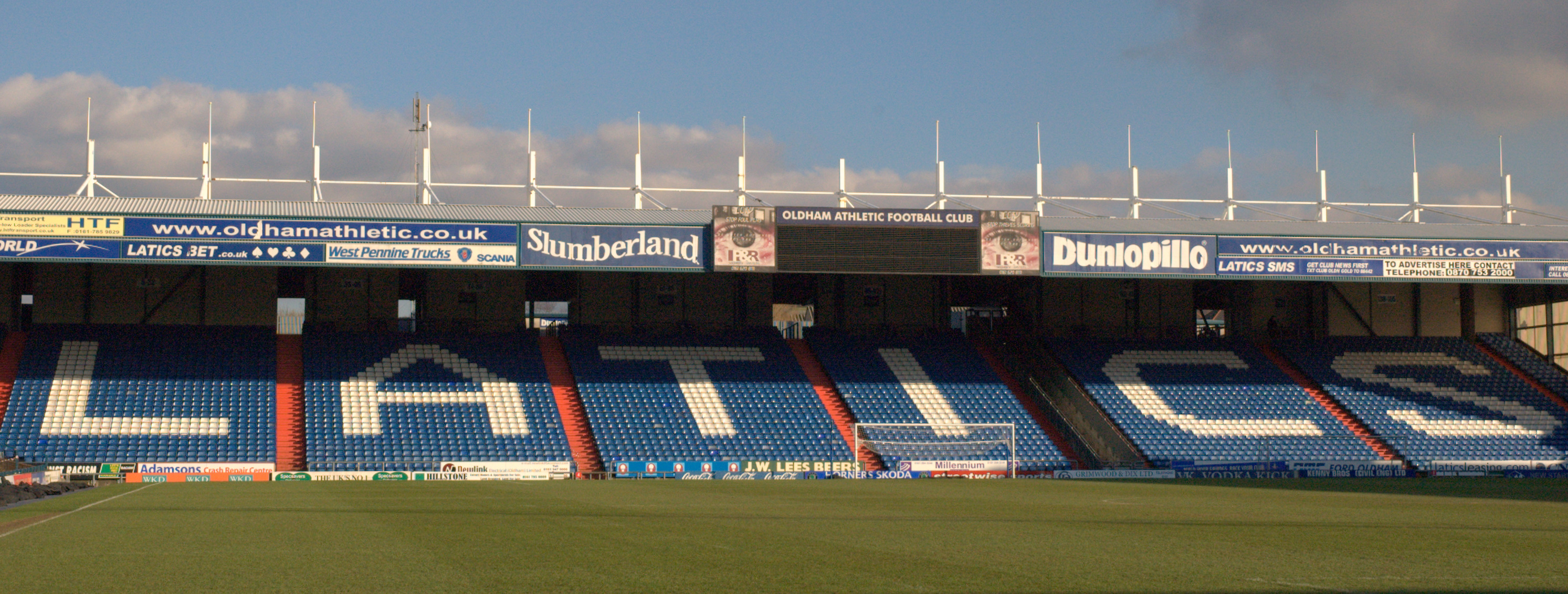
Rochdale Road stand in 2007

After playing at what was originally called Athletic Ground, Boundary Park was opened for Oldham's first football club—Oldham County F.C. In 1899, after County had folded, Pine Villa moved into the ground and renamed the club and stadium. The stadium is located on the Oldham side of the conjunction of Oldham, Chadderton and Royton, and has a current capacity of 13,560. Before the demolition of the north stand in 2008, the stadium had a capacity of 13,624. The new north stand, now called the Joe Royle Stand, opened with many new facilities available. This was done in a bid to gain extra revenue in a troubled cash stricken period for the club since Moore's departure.

The record attendance is 47,671 during an FA Cup tie between Oldham and Sheffield Wednesday in 1930 – the ground capacity at the time was nearly 50,000.

In February 2006, the club unveiled plans for the reconstruction of the stadium. After initially being rejected by Oldham Council, the decision was overturned with permission for the entire ground to be redeveloped. The ground was expected to seat at least 16,000 and cost approximately £80 million. On 5 September 2008, Simon Blitz announced on World Soccer Daily podcast that due to the economic problems in England, the development of the stadium was placed on hold temporarily.

On 22 July 2009, the club and Oldham Council unveiled plans for an entirely new, £20 million stadium to be located in Failsworth. The club made an agreement with BAE Systems to purchase a 30-acre (120,000 m^{2}) piece of land, on which the club plans to build an initial 12,000-capacity arena along with other leisure and corporate facilities. Oldham Council initially backed the plans for the new stadium after council chiefs voted in favour of pushing forward with a land deal, but later offered the club £5.7 million to help with the redevelopment of Boundary Park, which would involve building a new North Stand on the site of the former Broadway Stand.

Initial preparatory work began on the site for the new North Stand at Boundary Park in mid-May 2013. The stand has a capacity of 2,671 for spectators and contains various other non-matchday facilities such as a gym, club shop, event centre, outside food kisosks and a fans' bar. The newly named Joe Royle Stand partially opened against Sheffield United on 17 October 2015, with maximum capacity operation and corporate facilities in use on 26 December 2015 vs. Doncaster Rovers.

== Support ==
Notable Oldham Athletic fans include the comedy duo Cannon and Ball, whom rewrote the song "Boys in Blue" (featured in the end credits of a film they both starred in also titled The Boys in Blue) for the club's FA and League cup runs in the 1989-1990 season, professor and former musician Brian Cox, ex-Manchester United footballer (and former Oldham manager) Paul Scholes, ex-Leeds Rhinos and England rugby captain Kevin Sinfield, The Courteeners' rhythm guitarist Danny Moores, glamour model Michelle Marsh, Hollyoaks actor Alex Carter and comedian Eric Sykes.

== Rivalries ==
Boundary Park is less than 10 miles (16 km) from the nearby Football League stadiums of Rochdale, Manchester City, Salford City and Manchester United, with the stadiums of Stockport County, Huddersfield Town, Burnley, Bolton Wanderers, Accrington Stanley and Blackburn Rovers all within a 20-mile (32 km) radius.

Traditional local rivals over the years include Bolton Wanderers, Bury, Huddersfield Town, Rochdale and Stockport County, although many of these clubs are no longer a regular opponent.

A survey conducted in August 2019 by GiveMeSport.com revealed that Latics fans consider Rochdale to be the club's main rival with 82% of votes, followed by Bolton Wanderers (74%), Huddersfield Town (67%), Blackburn Rovers (58%) and Manchester United (52%).

Conversely, Oldham Athletic have a long-standing supporters friendship with Eintracht Frankfurt. A small section of Frankfurt's support often makes the journey to Oldham Athletic games at Boundary Park.

== Players ==
=== First-team squad ===
As of 6 August 2026

Note: Flags indicate national team as defined under FIFA eligibility rules; some limited exceptions apply. Players may hold more than one non-FIFA nationality.

No.	Pos.	Nation	Player
1	GK	ENG	Mathew Hudson
2	DF	ENG	Gus Scott-Morriss
3	DF	SCO	Jamie Robson
4	MF	ENG	Tom Pett (captain)
5	DF	MSR	Donervon Daniels
6	DF	CMR	Manny Monthé
7	MF	ENG	Keenan Appiah-Forson
8	MF	GRN	Oliver Norburn
9	FW	CMR	Mike Fondop
10	FW	IRL	Calum Kavanagh
11	FW	WAL	Jack Stevens
14	MF	ENG	Noah Chilvers
15	FW	ENG	Kane Drummond
16	DF	ENG	Will Sutton

No.	Pos.	Nation	Player
17	FW	ENG	Favour Fawunmi (on loan from Stoke City)
18	MF	ENG	Ryan Woods
19	DF	ENG	Zain Tahir (on loan from Sheffield United)
20	FW	ENG	Elliott Nevitt
21	MF	ENG	Josh Hawkes
22	GK	ENG	Aston Wilson
23	DF	IRL	Ryan Delaney
24	DF	ENG	Lewis Temple (on loan from Bolton Wanderers)
26	MF	ENG	Kai Payne (on loan from Wigan Athletic)
27	MF	WAL	Oliver Hammond
30	MF	WAL	Tom Hill
32	DF	ENG	Alfie Hughes
33	DF	ENG	Isaac Anderson
34	MF	ENG	Harry Johnson

=== Out on loan ===
Note: Flags indicate national team as defined under FIFA eligibility rules; some limited exceptions apply. Players may hold more than one non-FIFA nationality.

No.	Pos.	Nation	Player
31	GK	ENG	Tom Donaghy (on loan at Radcliffe FC until 4th January 2027)

=== Women's team ===
Oldham Athletic have a women's team who play in the Greater Manchester Women's Football League.

In February 2024 Oldham Athletic announced a women's academy programme which would create a full-time environment for women players, alongside funding for full-time education.

== Club management ==
As of 31 March 2025

=== Club officials ===
Staff
Chairman	Frank Rothwell
Directors	Frank Rothwell, Luke Rothwell, Su Schofield, Darren Royle, Joe Royle, Kevin Roberts
CEO	Darren Royle
Club Secretary	Mark Sheridan
Club Doctors	Dr David Nichols & Dr Natalie Cheyne
Crowd Doctor	Dr Jim Weems

=== Coaching positions ===
Staff
Manager	Micky Mellon
Assistant manager	Gary Brabin
Goalkeeper coach	Scott Davies
Physiotherapists	Ian Liversedge, Luke Livsey, Claire Swindall
Head of Performance	Andrew Hodgen
Sports Scientist, Strength & Conditioning Coach	Trystan Jones
Performance Analyst	Jason Scrivener

=== Academy staff ===
Staff
Academy manager	Phil Arbelo-Dolan
Head of coaching	Nicky Adams, Danny Philliskirk
Assistant academy coaches	Ryan Williams, Trey Turner
Physiotherapist	Paris Kay

=== Managerial history ===
In the history of the club, only three managers have won a league title: George Hardwick (Division Three North, 1953), Jimmy Frizzell (Division Three, 1974) and Joe Royle (Division Two, 1991). Frizzell also won promotion from Division Four in 1971 (3rd place), as did Jack Rowley from the runners-up spot in 1963.

However, arguably the most successful manager in the club's history is David Ashworth. Appointed in 1906, he guided them to the Lancashire Combination Championship and promotion to the Football League in his first season. In 1910, after just three seasons in Division 2, they finished in second place and won promotion to the top flight of English football. For the next four years Ashworth maintained the club's smooth progress. They finished season 1913–14 in fourth place, only for Ashworth to move to Stockport County, leaving his successor Herbert Bamlett to take the team to its best-ever league placing the season after, when they finished runners-up to Everton, missing out on the League Championship by just one point.

Meanwhile, at the end of World War 1, Ashworth emerged as manager of Liverpool, guiding them to the League Championship in 1921–22, after they had finished fourth in his previous two seasons. Although he then took what seemed to many to be a strange decision, moving back to Oldham in a brave but failed attempt to save them from relegation in 1923, he remains the only Oldham Athletic manager ever to have won the Football League Championship with any club.

== Honours ==
Oldham Athletic's honours include:

League

- First Division (level 1)
  - Runners-up: 1914–15
- Second Division (level 2)
  - Champions: 1990–91
  - Runners-up: 1909–10
- Third Division North / Third Division (level 3)
  - Champions: 1952–53, 1973–74
- Fourth Division (level 4)
  - Runners-up: 1962–63
  - Promoted: 1970–71
- National League (level 5)
  - Play-off winners: 2025
- Lancashire Combination
  - Champions: 1906–07

Cup

- Football League Cup
  - Runners-up: 1989–90
- Lancashire Senior Cup
  - Winners: 1907–08, 1966–67, 2005–06
  - Runners-up: 1918–19, 1933–34, 1954–55, 1970–71, 2009–10, 2015–16
- Anglo-Scottish Cup
  - Runners-up: 1978–79

=== Club records ===
As of 11 June 2025

- Highest League finish: 2nd in First Division, 1914–15
- Best FA Cup performance: Semi-finals, 1912–13, 1989–90, 1993–94
- Best League Cup performance: Runners-up, 1989–90
- Record league victory: 11–0 vs. Southport, Division Four, Boundary Park, 26 December 1962
- Record FA Cup victory: 10–1 vs. Lytham, first round, Boundary Park, 28 November 1925
- Record League Cup victory: 7–0 vs. Scarborough, second round, Boundary Park, 25 October 1989
- Record league defeat: 13–4 vs. Tranmere Rovers, Division Three (North), Prenton Park, 26 December 1935
- Record FA Cup defeat: 6–0 vs. Huddersfield Town, third round, Leeds Road, 13 January 1932 and 6–0 vs. Tottenham Hotspur, third round, White Hart Lane, 14 January 1933
- Record League Cup defeat: 7–0 vs. Brentford, League Cup, third round, Brentford Community Stadium, 21 September 2021
- Record home attendance (all competitions): 47,671 vs. Sheffield Wednesday, FA Cup, fourth round, Boundary Park, 25 January 1930
- Record home league attendance: 45,304 vs. Blackpool, Division Two, Boundary Park 21 April 1930
- Longest unbeaten league run: 20 league games between 1 May 1990 and 17 November 1990 in Division Two
- Most league appearances: 525, Ian Wood, 1966–1980
- Most overall appearances (all competitions): 582, Ian Wood, 1966–1980
- Most league goals: 141, Roger Palmer, 1980–1994
- Most overall goals (all competitions): 156, Roger Palmer, 1980–1994
- Most league goals in a season: 33, Tom Davis, Division 3 (North), 1936–37
- Most overall goals in a season (all competitions): 38 Tom Davis, 1936–37
- Most goals by a single player in a league fixture: 7, Eric Gemmell, 26 December 1951, Division 3 (North)
- Most capped player: 25, Gunnar Halle – Norway, 1991–1996
- Record transfer fee paid: £750,000 Ian Olney, Aston Villa, June 1992
- Record transfer fee received: £1,700,000 Earl Barrett, Aston Villa, February 1992
- Oldest player: David Eyres aged 42, vs. Scunthorpe United, 6 May 2006
- Youngest player: Zak Emmerson, aged 15 years 73 days, vs. Walsall, 22 October 2019
