= 1907–08 Oldham Athletic A.F.C. season =

Oldham Athletic
1907–08 season
- Manager: David Ashworth
- Stadium: Boundary Park
- Football League Second Division: 3rd
- FA Cup: 2nd Round
- Top goalscorer: League: Frank Newton; All: Frank Newton

The 1907–08 season was Oldham Athletic's 13th in existence and their first in the Football League Second Division after winning the Lancashire Combination in the previous season.

In 1907–08 Leicester Fosse finished as Second Division runners-up, gaining promotion to the First Division, the highest level of English football. Oldham finished just below them. Oldham were Lancashire Cup Winners in 1907-08.

== Squad statistics ==
=== Appearances and goals ===
No.	Pos	Nat	Player	Total		Division 2		F.A. Cup	
No.	Pos	Nat	Player	Apps	Goals	Apps	Goals	Apps	Goals
	MF	(England) ENG	Bill Bottomley	13	0	13	0	0	0
	FW	(England) ENG	Matt Brunton	2	0	1	0	1	0
	DF	(England) ENG	Billy Cook	2	0	2	0	0	0
	FW	(England) ENG	Billy Dodds	13	3	13	3	0	0
	DF	(England) ENG	Jimmy Fay	42	2	38	2	4	0
	DF	(England) ENG	James Hamilton	41	1	37	1	4	0
	FW	(England) ENG	Harry Hancock	31	10	27	7	4	3
	MF	(England) ENG	Frank Hesham	29	9	25	8	4	1
	GK	(England) ENG	Bob Hewitson	31	0	27	0	4	0
	DF	(England) ENG	Jimmy Hodson	40	0	36	0	4	0
	FW	(England) ENG	Frank Newton	39	30	36	28	3	2
	GK	(England) ENG	Elijah Round	8	0	8	0	0	0
	FW	(England) ENG	Joe Shadbolt	27	11	23	9	4	2
	DF	(England) ENG	Jack Shufflebotham	2	0	1	0	1	0
	DF	(England) ENG	Joe Stafford	1	0	1	0	0	0
	MF	(England) ENG	Jimmy Swarbrick	3	2	3	2	0	0
	DF	(England) ENG	David Walders	28	0	25	0	3	0
	MF	(England) ENG	Wilkie Ward	15	1	15	1	0	0
	FW	(England) ENG	Harry Watts	9	4	9	4	0	0
	MF	(England) ENG	Alex Whaites	39	10	35	8	4	2
	MF	(Scotland) SCO	David Wilson	42	4	38	3	4	1
	FW	(England) ENG	Arthur Wolstenholme	2	0	2	0	0	0
	GK	(England) ENG	Bill Wright	3	0	3	0	0	0

== Final league table ==
Pos	Team	Pld	W	D	L	GF	GA	GAv	Pts	Promotion or relegation
1	Bradford City (C, P)	38	24	6	8	90	42	2.143	54	Promotion to the First Division
2	Leicester Fosse (P)	38	21	10	7	72	47	1.532	52	Promotion to the First Division
3	Oldham Athletic	38	22	6	10	76	42	1.810	50	
4	Fulham	38	22	5	11	82	49	1.673	49	
5	West Bromwich Albion	38	19	9	10	61	39	1.564	47	

(C) Champions; (P) Promoted

== Competitions ==
=== Second Division ===
7 September 1907 1	Stoke City	1–3	Oldham Athletic	Stoke-on-Trent
	Watkins	Report	Swarbrick; Newton; Dodds	Stadium: Victoria Ground; Attendance: 10,000

14 September 1907 2	Oldham Athletic	2–1	West Bromwich Albion	Oldham
	Hancock; Swarbrick	Report	Garratt	Stadium: Boundary Park; Attendance: 14,397

21 September 1907 3	Bradford City	1–0	Oldham Athletic	Bradford
	McDonald	Report		Stadium: Valley Parade; Attendance: 17,000

28 September 1907 4	Oldham Athletic	3–0	Hull City	Oldham
	Dodds; Fay; Newton (penalty missed)	Report		Stadium: Boundary Park; Attendance: 12,041

5 October 1907 5	Derby County	1–0	Oldham Athletic	Derby
	Warren	Report		Stadium: Baseball Ground; Attendance: 10,000

12 October 1907 6	Oldham Athletic	4–0	Lincoln City	Oldham
	Newton; Hesham; Whaites	Report		Stadium: Boundary Park; Attendance: 5,116; Referee: F Heath

19 October 1907 7	Fulham	1–2	Oldham Athletic	London
	Fraser	Report	Newton; Dodds	Stadium: Craven Cottage; Attendance: 25,000

26 October 1907 8	Oldham Athletic	1–0	Barnsley	Oldham
	Newton	Report		Stadium: Boundary Park; Attendance: 6,582

2 November 1907 9	Chesterfield	1–2	Oldham Athletic	Chesterfield
	Marples (pen.)	Report	Newton; Wilson	Stadium: Saltergate; Attendance: 7,500

4 November 1907 10	West Bromwich Albion	1–2	Oldham Athletic	West Bromwich
	Walker	Report	Whaites; Newton	Stadium: The Hawthorns; Attendance: 12,000

9 November 1907 11	Oldham Athletic	1–1	Burnley	Oldham
	Whaites	Report	Beddow 44'	Stadium: Boundary Park; Attendance: 9,185

16 November 1907 12	Oldham Athletic	2–0	Grimsby Town	Oldham
	Newton (pen.)	Report		Stadium: Boundary Park; Attendance: 8,097

23 November 1907 13	Clapton Orient	2–0	Oldham Athletic	London
	Parker; Leigh	Report		Stadium: Clapton Stadium; Attendance: 7,000

30 November 1907 14	Oldham Athletic	4–2	Leeds City	Oldham
	Newton 15'; Fay 75'; Hesham 80'; Whaites 80'	Report	McLeod 43'; Gemmell 47'	Stadium: Boundary Park; Attendance: 9,165; Referee: A Hargreaves

14 December 1907 15	Oldham Athletic	4–1	Gainsborough Trinity	Oldham
	Shadbolt; Newton	Report	Tellum; Davidson (red card)	Stadium: Boundary Park; Attendance: 4,884

21 December 1907 16	Stockport County	2–3	Oldham Athletic	Stockport
	Crump; Carter	Report	Hesham; Wilson; Newton	Stadium: Edgeley Park; Attendance: 10,000

25 December 1907 17	Leicester Fosse	4–1	Oldham Athletic	Leicester
	Humphreys; Hubbard; Shinton	Report	Shadbolt	Stadium: Filbert Street; Attendance: 20,000

26 December 1907 18	Oldham Athletic	3–2	Blackpool	Oldham
	Hancock; Newton	Report	Gow; Grundy	Stadium: Boundary Park; Attendance: 3,665

28 December 1907 19	Oldham Athletic	0–0	Glossop	Oldham
		Report		Stadium: Boundary Park; Attendance: 6,279

1 January 1908 20	Blackpool	1–0	Oldham Athletic	Blackpool
	Grundy	Report		Stadium: Bloomfield Road; Attendance: 4,000

4 January 1908 21	Oldham Athletic	3–1	Stoke City	Oldham
	Hesham; Hancock	Report	Brown	Stadium: Boundary Park; Attendance: 6,300

18 January 1908 22	Oldham Athletic	4–0	Bradford City	Oldham
	Hesham; Newton; Whaites	Report		Stadium: Boundary Park; Attendance: 14,603

25 January 1908 23	Hull City	3–2	Oldham Athletic	Hull
	Smith; Robinson	Report	Hesham; Newton	Stadium: Anlaby Road; Attendance: 10,000

8 February 1908 24	Lincoln City	0–2	Oldham Athletic	Lincoln
		Report	Shadbolt 29'; Whaites 71'	Stadium: Sincil Bank; Attendance: 4,000; Referee: F Heath

15 February 1908 25	Oldham Athletic	3–3	Fulham	Oldham
	Newton; Watts; Shadbolt	Report	Harrison; Dalrymple	Stadium: Boundary Park; Attendance: 8,004

29 February 1908 26	Oldham Athletic	4–0	Chesterfield	Oldham
	Newton; Hamilton (pen.); Hesham	Report		Stadium: Boundary Park; Attendance: 4,128

7 March 1908 27	Burnley	2–1	Oldham Athletic	Burnley
	Whittaker; Mayson	Report	Newton	Stadium: Turf Moor; Attendance: 16,000

14 March 1908 28	Grimsby Town	2–0	Oldham Athletic	Cleethorpes
	Hakin; Stokes	Report		Stadium: Blundell Park; Attendance: 4,000

19 March 1908 29	Barnsley	2–1	Oldham Athletic	Barnsley
	McShea; Surtees	Report	Wilson	Stadium: Oakwell; Attendance: 6,000

21 March 1908 30	Oldham Athletic	4–1	Clapton Orient	Oldham
	Shadbolt; Watts; Newton	Report	Greechan	Stadium: Boundary Park; Attendance: 6,569

28 March 1908 31	Leeds City	1–2	Oldham Athletic	Leeds
	Parnell	Report	Shadbolt; Newton	Stadium: Elland Road; Attendance: 15,000; Referee: A Hargreaves

30 March 1908 32	Oldham Athletic	3–1	Derby County	Oldham
	Watts; Newton; Waites	Report	Bentley	Stadium: Boundary Park; Attendance: 10,753

4 April 1908 33	Oldham Athletic	2–0	Wolverhampton Wanderers	Oldham
	Newton; Waites	Report		Stadium: Boundary Park; Attendance: 9,008

11 April 1908 34	Gainsborough Trinity	1–1	Oldham Athletic	Gainsborough
	Wood	Report	Watts	Stadium: The Northolme; Attendance: 5,000

18 April 1908 35	Oldham Athletic	5–0	Stockport County	Oldham
	Newton; Ward; Hancock; Shadbolt	Report		Stadium: Boundary Park; Attendance: 9,845

20 April 1908 36	Wolverhampton Wanderers	2–1	Oldham Athletic	Wolverhampton
	Radford; Shelton	Report	Shadbolt	Stadium: Molineux Stadium; Attendance: 17,000

21 April 1908 37	Oldham Athletic	1–1	Leicester Fosse	Oldham
	Hancock	Report	Shanks	Stadium: Boundary Park; Attendance: 23,110

25 April 1908 38	Glossop	0–0	Oldham Athletic	Glossop
		Report		Stadium: North Road; Attendance: 6,000

=== F.A. Cup ===
7 December 1907 Q5	Oldham Athletic	8–1	Darwen	Oldham
	Hancock; Wilson; Shadbolt; Newton; Hesham		Crook	Stadium: Boundary Park; Attendance: 4,000

11 January 1908 1	Oldham Athletic	2–1	Leeds City	Oldham
	Whaites 13'; Newton 44'	Report	Parnell 57'	Stadium: Boundary Park; Attendance: 14,000

1 February 1908 2	Oldham Athletic	0–0	Everton	Oldham
		Report		Stadium: Boundary Park; Attendance: 25,690

5 February 1908 2	Everton	6–1	Oldham Athletic	Liverpool
	Young; Bolton; Abbott	Report	Whaites	Stadium: Goodison Park; Attendance: 26,849
