= List of Oldham Athletic A.F.C. players (25–99 appearances) =

This is a list of footballers who have made between 25 and 99 competitive appearances for Oldham Athletic A.F.C. since the club joined the football league in 1907.

Name	Nationality	Position	Club career	League apps	League goals	Total apps	Total goals	Notes
Harry Hancock	England	FW	1907–1908	27	7	31	10	
Bob Hewitson	England	GK	1907–1908	27	0	31	0	
Joe Shadbolt	England	FW	1907–1909	27	9	33	11	
Frank Hesham	England	MF	1907–1909	34	8	40	9	
Alex Whaites	England	MF	1907–1909	42	8	46	10	
Frank Newton	England	FW	1907–1909	81	45	86	47	
Arthur Griffiths	England	FW	1908–1909	25	4	26	4	
Arthur Wolstenholme	England	FW	1908–1909, 1919–1920	52	12	54	12	
Billy Cope	England	DF	1908–1914	62	1	65	1	
Alex Downie	Scotland	MF	1909–1911	48	0	49	0	
Bill Montgomery	Scotland	FW	1909–1912	70	26	75	26	
Stan Miller	England	MF	1909–1913	39	0	41	0	
Hugh McDonald	Scotland	GK	1910–1911	41	0	44	0	
Alf Toward	England	FW	1910–1913	72	30	78	33	
Steve Buxton	England	DF	1911–1912	27	0	28	0	
Evan Jones	Wales	FW	1911–1912	50	25	54	25	
George Hunter	England	MF	1912–1913	40	1	46	1	
Bill Bradbury	England	MF	1912–1913, 1919–1921	74	5	77	5	
Gilbert Kemp	England	FW	1912–1915	64	23	72	28	
Arthur Dixon	England	MF	1913–1915	30	0	31	0	
Charlie Roberts	England	DF	1913–1915	72	2	79	2	
Ted Taylor	England	GK	1913–1922	87	0	92	0	
Bill Goodwin	Wales	DF	1915–1920	42	0	43	0	
Bob Stewart	Scotland	DF	1919–1921	34	0	36	0	
George Wall	England	MF	1919–1921	74	11	76	11	
Billy Halligan	Ireland	FW	1920	28	9	28	9	
Stan Charlton	England	DF	1920–1921	38	0	39	0	
Dicky Jones	England	MF	1920–1922	25	0	27	0	
Sandy Campbell	Scotland	FW	1920–1922	41	8	41	8	
Jack Tatton	England	MF	1920–1922	67	2	70	2	
Alf Marshall	England	MF	1920–1923	66	3	69	3	
Reuben Butler	England	FW	1920–1923	77	32	78	32	
Jimmy Marshall	Scotland	FW	1920–1923	80	18	84	19	
Charlie Wallace	England	MF	1921–1923	47	3	50	3	
Ike Bassindale	England	MF	1921–1925	50	0	50	0	
John Blair	England	FW	1922–1924	26	16	28	17	
Chris Staniforth	England	FW	1922–1924	35	7	37	8	
Charlie Jones	Wales	MF	1923–1925	56	5	58	5	
Tommy Heaton	England	MF	1923–1926	59	3	64	3	
Bob Gillespie	England	FW	1924–1925	27	5	28	5	
Arthur Ormston	England	FW	1925–1926	43	22	47	24	
Horace Barnes	England	FW	1925–1927	41	16	46	20	
George Taylor	England	FW	1925–1929	71	22	75	22	
Jack Armitage	England	DF	1926–1929	90	3	94	3	
Jack King	England	MF	1926–1929, 1931	80	12	84	13	
Neil Harris	Scotland	FW	1927–1929	39	17	40	17	
Alf Brown	England	MF	1928–1933	44	0	47	0	
Laurie Cumming	Northern Ireland	FW	1929–1930	25	11	26	12	
Stewart Littlewood	England	FW	1929–1931	78	45	81	47	
Seth King	England	DF	1929–1932	91	0	96	0	
Frank Moss	England	GK	1930–1931	29	0	30	0	
Jack Pears	England	MF	1930–1934	92	34	97	34	
Arthur Finney	England	DF	1931–1932	30	0	30	0	
Tommy Pickersgill	England	MF	1931–1933	39	0	40	0	
Bill Johnstone	Scotland	FW	1931–1933	68	29	70	29	
Harry Johnson	England	FW	1932–1933	37	12	38	12	
Horace Pearson	England	GK	1932–1933	38	0	39	0	
Billy Johnston	Scotland	FW	1932–1934	67	8	70	8	
Harry Rowley	England	FW	1933–1934	70	14	73	15	
Bob Grice	England	DF	1933–1935	26	0	27	0	
Peter Burke	England	DF	1933–1935	93	6	99	6	
Arthur Bailey	England	FW	1933–1936	53	12	59	14	
Tommy Reid	Scotland	FW	1933–1936	67	35	71	36	
Fred Schofield	England	MF	1933–1936	82	3	85	4	
Jack Robson	England	MF	1934–1935	37	8	41	9	
Fred Swift	England	GK	1934–1935	54	0	55	0	
Arthur Buckley	England	MF	1934–1936	47	10	53	12	
Bill Walsh	England	FW	1934–1936	78	48	85	54	
Harry Church	England	GK	1935–1936	23	0	27	0	
Fred Leedham	England	FW	1935–1937	48	11	53	11	
Tommy Davis	Ireland	FW	1935–1938	72	51	81	58	
George Milligan	England	MF	1935–1938	82	2	86	6	
Paddy Robbins	Ireland	FW	1935–1938	80	15	87	17	
Patrick McCormick	England	FW	1936–1938	38	13	46	17	
Jack Diamond	England	FW	1936–1938	50	23	53	23	
Percy Downes	England	MF	1936–1938	51	4	58	4	
Norman Price	Scotland	DF	1936–1938	73	0	81	0	
Bert Eaves	England	DF	1937–1939	28	0	30	0	
Bert Blackshaw	England	FW	1937–1939	59	14	64	16	
Tommy Butler	England	MF	1937–1939, 1946–1947	75	12	79	12	
David Halford	England	MF	1938–1939	26	11	28	11	
Ernie Wright	England	FW	1938–1939	37	5	38	6	
Tom Shipman	England	DF	1938–1945	40	0	47	0	
Ron Ferrier	England	FW	1938–1947	45	25	49	27	
Jack Bowden	England	MF	1945–1948	72	1	77	2	
Les Horton	England	MF	1945–1948	79	2	87	3	
Ollie Burns	Scotland	FW	1946–1947	25	5	27	5	
Fred Howe	England	FW	1946–1947	30	20	31	20	
Jack Ormandy	England	MF	1946–1947	30	5	31	5	
Bill Harris	England	GK	1946–1947	32	0	34	0	
Ben Bunting	England	DF	1946–1948	32	0	34	0	
Jerry Boothman	England	DF	1946–1948	44	0	47	0	
Bill Blackshaw	England	MF	1946–1948	67	22	69	22	
Jock Wilson	Scotland	FW	1947–1948	29	2	31	3	
Brendan McManus	Northern Ireland	GK	1947–1948	35	0	37	0	
John Jones	Wales	GK	1948–1949	22	0	26	0	
Ernie Woodcock	England	MF	1948–1950	28	4	28	4	
Harry Stock	England	FW	1948–1950	35	10	39	11	
Albert Watson	England	MF	1948–1950	42	0	47	0	
Bill Pickering	England	DF	1948–1950	78	0	87	0	
Viv Aston	England	DF	1948–1951	30	1	30	1	
Albert Wadsworth	England	FW	1949–1952	33	8	35	8	
Syd Goodfellow	England	MF	1950–1952	72	2	77	3	
Ron Fawley	England	MF	1950–1958	94	9	98	10	
Jack Warner	Wales	MF	1951–1952	34	2	36	2	
Peter McKennan	Scotland	FW	1951–1953	78	28	83	33	
Bob Jackson	England	DF	1951–1955	29	1	31	1	
Alf Clarke	England	FW	1952–1954	43	12	48	14	
Tommy Lowrie	Scotland	MF	1952–1955	79	5	84	5	
Rex Adams	England	MF	1953–1954	23	2	25	2	
Joe Harris	Northern Ireland	FW	1953–1954	27	4	27	4	
Bill McGlen	England	MF	1953–1955	68	3	70	3	
Frank Scrine	Wales	FW	1953–1956	78	21	82	22	
Jimmy Kerr	England	MF	1954–1955	34	4	36	4	
Harry McShane	Scotland	MF	1954–1955	41	5	42	6	
Eamonn Darcy	Ireland	GK	1954–1956	45	0	47	0	
George Crook	England	FW	1954–1957	57	13	57	13	
Kenny Chaytor	England	FW	1954–1960	77	20	80	20	
Eric Betts	England	MF	1956–1957	26	5	27	5	
Jackie Campbell	England	MF	1956–1957	26	5	27	5	
Dave Pearson	Scotland	FW	1956–1957	25	12	27	13	
Derek Williams	Wales	GK	1956–1957	28	0	30	0	
Gerry Duffy	England	FW	1956–1959	58	21	62	23	
Eddie Murphy	Scotland	DF	1956–1959	72	0	76	0	
David Teece	England	GK	1956–1959	91	0	96	0	
Ken Murray	England	FW	1957–1958	35	14	36	15	
Ian Muir	Scotland	DF	1957–1958	35	0	37	0	
Ray John	Wales	MF	1958–1959	32	5	37	5	
Wally Taylor	England	DF	1958–1959	51	0	53	0	
Albert Bourne	England	FW	1958–1960	35	9	38	10	
Ivan Beswick	England	DF	1958–1960	47	0	49	0	
Peter Stringfellow	England	FW	1958–1960	54	16	55	16	
Keith Robinson	England	FW	1958–1961	40	4	41	4	
Allan Hall	England	MF	1958–1961	74	5	79	5	
Jimmy Mallon	Scotland	DF	1959–1960	31	8	33	8	
Jim Ferguson	Scotland	GK	1959–1960	36	0	39	0	
Jimmy McGill	Scotland	DF	1959–1960	38	2	40	3	
Charlie Ferguson	Scotland	DF	1959–1960	57	0	60	0	
Billy O'Loughlin	England	MF	1959–1961	27	0	29	0	
John Liddell	Scotland	FW	1960–1961	23	10	25	11	
George Greenall	England	DF	1960–1961	25	0	30	0	
Brian Birch	England	FW	1960–1961	35	11	39	12	
John McCue	England	DF	1960–1962	56	0	64	0	
Jimmy Rollo	Scotland	GK	1960–1963	59	0	62	0	
Jimmy Scott	England	MF	1961–1964	76	0	88	0	
Billy Marshall	Northern Ireland	DF	1962–1964	57	0	63	0	
Colin Whitaker	England	MF	1962–1964	72	29	76	31	
George Sievwright	Scotland	MF	1963–1964	37	4	40	4	
Barry Taylor	England	DF	1963–1964	40	0	44	0	
Albert Jackson	England	FW	1964–1965	22	4	25	5	
Barrie Martin	England	DF	1964–1965	42	4	46	5	
Jimmy Harris	England	FW	1964–1966	29	9	30	11	
Billy Dearden	England	FW	1964–1966	35	2	40	4	
Albert Quixall	England	FW	1964–1966	36	11	41	12	
Billy McGinn	Scotland	DF	1964–1966	38	0	43	0	
Tony Bartley	England	MF	1964–1966	50	13	56	15	
Ron Swan	Scotland	GK	1964–1966	64	0	71	0	
Jim Pennington	England	MF	1965–1966	23	0	28	1	
Stewart Holden	England	DF	1965–1966	42	5	46	8	
Frank Large	England	FW	1966	34	18	37	19	
John Collins	England	FW	1966–1967	21	8	25	11	
Dennis Stevens	England	FW	1966–1967	33	0	38	0	
Jimmy McIlroy	Northern Ireland	MF	1966–1967	39	1	42	1	
Ken Knighton	England	MF	1966–1967	45	4	52	4	
Bill Asprey	England	MF	1966–1967	80	4	90	5	
Billy Johnston	Northern Ireland	MF	1966–1968	29	6	33	6	
Alan Philpott	England	MF	1967–1968	31	1	34	1	
Ally Doyle	Northern Ireland	DF	1967–1969	33	0	35	0	
Eric Magee	Northern Ireland	MF	1967–1969	45	9	49	10	
Allan Hunter	Northern Ireland	DF	1967–1969	83	1	90	1	
Walter Joyce	England	DF	1967–1970	71	2	72	2	
Alan Spence	England	FW	1968–1969	27	12	28	13	
Barry Gordine	England	GK	1968–1971	83	0	88	0	
Jim Beardall	England	FW	1969–1970	22	10	26	10	
Tommy Bryceland	Scotland	MF	1969–1972	66	10	72	11	
Arthur Thomson	Scotland	DF	1970	28	0	30	0	
Jim Fryatt	England	FW	1970–1971	76	40	81	42	
Don Heath	England	MF	1970–1972	45	1	50	1	
Paul Clements	England	MF	1971–1972	35	0	37	1	
Andy Sweeney	England	MF	1971–1974	42	2	44	2	
Mike Lester	England	MF	1972–1973	27	2	29	2	
Andy Lochhead	Scotland	FW	1973–1974	45	10	54	11	
George Jones	England	FW	1973–1975	71	19	88	26	
Tony Bailey	England	DF	1974	26	1	32	1	
Jim Branagan	England	DF	1974–1977	27	0	29	0	
David Irving	England	FW	1976–1977	21	7	27	8	
Carl Valentine	England	MF	1976–1979	82	8	99	10	
Steve Taylor	England	FW	1977–1978	47	25	57	28	
Steve Gardner	England	MF	1977–1980	53	2	67	2	
Mark Hilton	England	MF	1978–1981	50	2	58	3	
Steve Edwards	England	DF	1978–1983	80	0	96	0	
Nick Sinclair	England	DF	1978–1984	75	1	81	1	
Simon Stainrod	England	FW	1979–1980	69	21	79	26	
Ryszard Kowenicki	Poland	MF	1979–1981	42	5	49	8	
Jon Bowden	England	MF	1982–1985	82	5	91	6	
David Cross	England	FW	1983–1984	22	6	25	7	
Martin Buchan	Scotland	DF	1983–1984	28	0	30	0	
Joe McBride	Scotland	MF	1983–1985	36	5	38	5	
Derrick Parker	England	FW	1983–1985	57	11	61	14	
Mark Ward	England	MF	1983–1985	84	12	92	12	
Bob Colville	England	FW	1984–1986	32	4	36	4	
Micky Quinn	England	FW	1984–1986	80	34	86	37	
Paul Jones	England	DF	1985–1987	32	1	33	3	
Ron Futcher	England	FW	1985–1987	65	30	73	32	
Mick McGuire	England	MF	1985–1987	69	3	75	4	
Gary Williams	England	DF	1985–1990	61	12	75	16	
Andy Gorton	England	GK	1986–1988	26	0	32	0	
Mike Flynn	England	DF	1987–1988	40	1	45	1	
Mike Cecere	England	FW	1987–1988	52	8	63	10	
John Kelly	England	MF	1987–1989	52	6	58	6	
Frankie Bunn	England	FW	1987–1990	78	26	88	35	
Ian Ormondroyd	England	FW	1987, 1996–1997	41	9	43	9	
Peter Skipper	England	DF	1988–1989	27	1	30	1	
Andy Rhodes	England	GK	1988–1990	69	0	79	0	
Paul Warhurst	England	MF	1988–1991	67	2	86	2	
David Currie	England	FW	1990–1991	31	3	36	5	
Neil Redfearn	England	MF	1990–1991	62	16	74	20	
Paul Moulden	England	FW	1990–1993	38	4	41	5	
Paul Kane	Scotland	MF	1991	21	0	25	0	
Neil McDonald	England	DF	1991–1994	24	1	29	1	
Ian Olney	England	FW	1992–1995	45	13	53	14	
Darren Beckford	England	FW	1993–1996	52	11	65	17	
David Beresford	England	MF	1993–1997	64	2	74	2	
Nicky Banger	England	FW	1994–1997	64	10	74	11	
Andy Hughes	England	MF	1995–1997	33	1	42	1	
Toddi Örlygsson	Iceland	MF	1995–1999	76	1	88	1	
David McNiven	England	FW	1996–1999	26	2	29	2	
Matthew Rush	England	MF	1997–1998	24	3	28	3	
Lee Sinnott	England	DF	1997–1998	31	0	35	0	
Doug Hodgson	Australia	DF	1997–1998	41	4	44	6	
Phil Salt	England	MF	1997–2001	22	0	31	2	
Mark Innes	Scotland	MF	1997–2001	73	1	90	1	
Stuart Thom	England	DF	1998–2000	34	3	37	3	
Steve Whitehall	England	FW	1998–2000	76	13	88	15	
Mark Hotte	England	DF	1998–2001	65	0	74	0	
Paul Jones	England	DF	1999–2000	28	3	32	3	
Ryan Sugden	England	FW	1999–2001	21	1	25	1	
Craig Dudley	England	FW	1999–2002	60	10	73	13	
David Miskelly	Northern Ireland	GK	1999–2003	20	0	26	0	
Barry Prenderville	Ireland	DF	2000–2001	21	0	26	0	
Tony Carss	England	MF	2000–2003	75	5	84	6	
Danny Boshell	England	MF	2000–2005	70	2	85	4	
Stuart Balmer	Scotland	DF	2001–2002	36	6	44	6	
Paul Rachubka	England	GK	2001–2002, 2013–2015	48	0	56	0	
Julien Baudet	France	DF	2001–2003	44	3	52	3	
Chris Armstrong	England	DF	2001–2003	65	1	79	1	
Dave Beharall	England	DF	2001–2004	60	3	78	3	
Clint Hill	England	DF	2002–2003	17	1	25	1	
Josh Low	Wales	MF	2002–2003	21	3	27	4	
Clyde Wijnhard	Netherlands	FW	2002–2003	25	10	31	13	
Wayne Andrews	England	FW	2002–2003	37	11	46	12	
Fitz Hall	England	DF	2002–2003	44	5	54	6	
Michael Clegg	England	DF	2002–2004	46	0	52	0	
Matty Appleby	England	MF	2002–2005	46	2	50	3	
Adam Griffin	England	MF	2002–2005	62	3	74	4	
Scott Vernon	England	FW	2002–2005	75	20	88	27	
Chris Killen	New Zealand	FW	2002–2006	78	17	90	23	
Calvin Zola-Makongo	DR Congo	FW	2003–2004	25	5	28	7	
Ernie Cooksey	England	MF	2003–2004	37	4	41	6	
Jermaine Johnson	Jamaica	MF	2003–2005	39	9	43	10	
Marc Tierney	England	DF	2003–2006	37	0	47	0	
Danny Hall	England	DF	2003–2006	64	1	79	1	
Chris Hall	England	FW	2003–2007	43	1	54	5	
Matty Wolfenden	England	FW	2003–2009	39	2	48	4	
Mark Bonner	England	MF	2004–2005	33	1	37	1	
Kevin Betsy	Seychelles	FW	2004–2005	36	5	44	5	
Neil Kilkenny	Australia	MF	2004–2005, 2007–2008	47	5	59	8	
Gareth Owen	Wales	DF	2004–2006	41	1	45	1	
Luke Beckett	England	FW	2004–2006	43	24	47	24	
Mark Hughes	Northern Ireland	MF	2004–2006	60	1	73	1	
Kelvin Lomax	England	DF	2004–2010	82	0	94	0	
Rob Scott	England	MF	2005–2006	21	1	26	1	
Chris Day	England	GK	2005–2006	30	0	36	0	
Richard Butcher	England	MF	2005–2006	36	4	39	4	
Terrell Forbes	England	DF	2005–2006	39	0	44	0	
Guy Branston	England	DF	2005–2006	45	2	50	2	
Paul Edwards	England	MF	2005–2007	60	0	68	0	
Chris Porter	England	FW	2005–2007 2022–2023	69	29	78	32	
Simon Charlton	England	DF	2006–2007	34	1	39	1	
Craig Rocastle	Grenada	MF	2006–2007	35	2	39	3	
Gary McDonald	Scotland	MF	2006–2008	78	11	92	13	
Neal Trotman	England	DF	2006–2008, 2011	36	1	42	3	
Jean-Paul Kalala	DR Congo	MF	2007–2008	20	0	26	1	
Craig Davies	Wales	FW	2007–2008, 2017–2018	84	21	99	27	
Lee Hughes	England	FW	2007–2009	55	25	61	26	
Mark Crossley	Wales	GK	2007–2009	59	0	70	0	
Lewis Alessandra	England	FW	2007–2011	67	8	76	8	
Daniel Jones	England	DF	2008–2009	23	1	25	1	
Kevin Maher	Ireland	MF	2008–2009	28	1	32	1	
Chris O'Grady	England	FW	2008–2009, 2018–2019	51	7	64	8	
Danny Whitaker	England	MF	2008–2010	80	8	87	11	
Paul Black	England	DF	2008–2012	60	1	70	1	
Jason Jarrett	England	MF	2008, 2010	23	3	25	3	
Joe Colbeck	England	MF	2009–2010	27	1	28	1	
Keigan Parker	Scotland	FW	2009–2010	27	2	29	2	
Alex Marrow	England	MF	2009–2010	32	1	34	1	
Pawel Abbott	Poland	FW	2009–2010	39	13	41	13	
Ryan Brooke	England	FW	2009–2011	29	2	31	2	
Dean Brill	England	GK	2009–2011	58	0	63	0	
Dale Stephens	England	MF	2009–2011	60	11	63	12	
Cedric Evina	Cameroon	DF	2010–2011	27	2	28	2	
Ritchie Jones	England	MF	2010–2011	31	1	33	1	
Oumare Tounkara	France	FW	2010–2012	52	8	54	8	
Filipe Morais	Portugal	MF	2010–2012, 2019–2020	75	10	88	11	
Kirk Millar	Northern Ireland	MF	2010–2014	38	1	44	1	
Zander Diamond	Scotland	DF	2011–2012	23	2	31	2	
Reuben Reid	England	FW	2011–2012	39	7	44	8	
Tom Adeyemi	England	MF	2011–2012	36	2	45	3	
Shefki Kuqi	Finland	FW	2011–2012	40	11	49	16	
Youssouf M'Changama	Comoros	MF	2011–2013	26	2	30	2	
Alex Cisak	Australia	GK	2011–2013	48	0	59	0	
Matt Smith	England	FW	2011–2013	62	9	75	14	
Robbie Simpson	England	FW	2011–2013	66	8	80	13	
James Tarkowski	England	DF	2011–2014	72	5	89	6	
David Mellor	England	MF	2011–2015	48	1	62	1	
Reece Wabara	England	DF	2012–2013	25	0	29	2	
Cliff Byrne	Ireland	DF	2012–2013	38	1	43	1	
Cristian Montano	Colombia	MF	2012–2013	40	3	48	4	
Dean Bouzanis	Australia	GK	2012–2013	45	0	51	0	
Jose Baxter	England	MF	2012–2013, 2018–2019	72	19	84	21	
Connor Brown	England	DF	2012–2016	89	1	98	1	
Charlie MacDonald	England	FW	2013–2014	30	5	30	5	
Adam Rooney	Ireland	FW	2013–2014	24	4	33	7	
Mark Oxley	England	GK	2013–2014	36	0	43	0	
Jonson Clarke-Harris	England	FW	2013–2014	45	7	55	9	
Korey Smith	England	MF	2013–2014	52	1	62	2	
Genséric Kusunga	Angola	DF	2013–2015	36	2	46	3	
Paul Rachubka	England	GK	2013–2015	48	0	56	0	
James Dayton	England	MF	2013–2015	51	4	63	5	
Joseph Mills	England	DF	2013–2016	56	1	69	1	
Rhys Turner	England	FW	2014–2015	22	3	25	3	
George Elokobi	Cameroon	DF	2014–2015	24	3	27	3	
Adam Lockwood	England	DF	2014–2015	31	2	31	2	
Jonathan Forte	Barbados	FW	2014–2016	60	18	65	18	
Timothée Dieng	France	MF	2014–2016	60	1	68	1	
Dominic Poleon	England	FW	2014–2016	60	8	68	11	
Mike Jones	England	MF	2014–2016	80	9	86	10	
Liam Kelly	Scotland	MF	2014–2016	78	7	87	7	
Rhys Murphy	Ireland	FW	2015–2016	24	3	25	3	
Jake Cassidy	Wales	FW	2015–2016	21	0	25	0	
Joel Coleman	England	GK	2015–2016	43	0	45	0	
Anthony Gerrard	Ireland	DF	2015–2018	69	2	75	3	
George Edmundson	England	DF	2015–2019	65	3	79	3	
Cameron Dummigan	Northern Ireland	DF	2015–2019	74	3	85	3	
Darius Osei	England	FW	2016–2017	22	1	27	3	
Josh Law	England	DF	2016–2017	22	2	28	3	
Cameron Burgess	Australia	DF	2016–2017	23	1	31	2	
Billy McKay	Northern Ireland	FW	2016–2017	26	0	33	4	
Lee Erwin	Scotland	FW	2016–2017	34	8	40	10	
Ollie Banks	England	MF	2016–2017	40	2	51	3	
Connor Ripley	England	GK	2016–2017	46	0	54	0	
Ryan Flynn	Scotland	MF	2016–2018	44	1	54	3	
Paul Green	Ireland	MF	2016–2018	47	1	56	2	
Ryan McLaughlin	Northern Ireland	DF	2016–2018	52	3	62	3	
Aaron Holloway	Wales	FW	2016–2018	61	4	67	6	
Ousmane Fané	France	MF	2016–2018	80	0	92	0	
Eoin Doyle	Ireland	FW	2017–2018	30	15	34	17	
Kean Bryan	England	DF	2017–2018	32	2	37	2	
Tope Obadeyi	England	FW	2017–2018, 2022	45	3	50	5	
Johny Placide	Haiti	GK	2017–2018	36	0	42	0	
Jack Byrne	Ireland	MF	2017–2018	40	5	44	8	
Rob Hunt	England	DF	2017–2019	81	1	90	2	
Mohamed Maouche	France	MF	2017–2020	66	7	80	9	
Gevaro Nepomuceno	Curaçao	MF	2017–2020	83	9	95	10	
Daniel Iverson	Denmark	GK	2018–2019	42	0	49	0	
Callum Lang	England	FW	2018–2019	42	13	50	16	
Zeus De La Paz	Curaçao	GK	2018–2020	26	0	31	0	
Johan Branger	Gabon	MF	2018–2020	51	7	58	7	
Dylan Fage	France	MF	2019–2022	60	1	79	1	
Scott Wilson	England	FW	2019–2020	21	2	26	2	
Zak Mills	England	DF	2019–2020	25	1	29	1	
Désiré Segbé Azankpo	Benin	FW	2019–2020	28	4	32	6	
Jonny Smith	England	MF	2019–2020	28	9	32	11	
David Wheater	England	DF	2019–2020	34	4	35	4	
Alex Iacovitti	Scotland	DF	2019–2020	33	1	39	2	
Mo Sylla	France	MF	2019–2020	45	1	51	1	
Zak Dearnley	England	FW	2019–2021	44	11	53	15	
Kyle Jameson	England	DF	2020–2022	36	2	42	2	
Callum Whelan	England	MF	2020–2022	74	1	89	1	
Dylan Bahamboula	DR Congo	MF	2020–2022	68	9	91	11	
Raphaël Diarra	France	DF	2020–2022	28	0	36	0	
Sido Jombati	Portugal	DF	2020–2021	19	0	26	0	
Brice Ntambwe	Belgium	MF	2020–2021	24	0	28	0	
Bobby Grant	England	MF	2020–2021	23	3	29	7	
Danny Rowe	England	FW	2020–2021	25	7	32	11	
Harry Clarke	England	DF	2020–2021	32	1	35	1	
Ben Garrity	England	MF	2020–2021	29	2	38	4	
Ian Lawlor	Ireland	GK	2020–2021	30	0	39	0	
Alfie McCalmont	Northern Ireland	MF	2020–2021	35	8	39	10	
Cameron Borthwick-Jackson	England	DF	2020–2021	37	2	41	2	
Conor McAleny	England	FW	2020–2021	40	17	46	21	
Junior Luamba	England	FW	2020–2023	28	2	32	2	
Nicky Adams	England	MF	2021–2022	59	0	67	0	
Jamie Bowden	Ireland	MF	2021–2022	17	1	25	1	
Jayson Leutwiler	Canada	GK	2021–2023	22	0	30	0	
Harry Vaughan	Ireland	FW	2021–2023	33	1	40	2	
Hallam Hope	Barbados	FW	2021–2024	72	11	83	13	
Jordan Clarke	England	DF	2021–2023	58	1	65	1	
Sam Hart	England	DF	2021–2022	31	1	35	1	
Benny Couto	Portugal	DF	2021–2022	28	1	37	1	
Harrison McGahey	England	DF	2021–2024	56	0	62	1	
Jack Stobbs	England	MF	2021–2023	40	2	43	2	
Liam Hogan	England	DF	2022–2024	76	2	80	2	
Nathan Sheron	England	DF	2022–2024	89	9	91	9	
John Rooney	England	MF	2022–2023	36	2	37	2	
Ben Tollitt	England	MF	2022–2023	41	8	42	8	
Magnus Norman	England	GK	2022–2024	45	0	45	0	
Alex Reid	England	FW	2022–2025	35	8	37	10	
Joe Nuttall	England	FW	2022–2023	35	8	36	8	
Mark Shelton	England	MF	2023	35	2	35	2	
Devarn Green	England	FW	2023–2024	56	9	56	9	
Shaun Hobson	England	DF	2023–2025	55	0	60	0	
Josh Lundstram	England	MF	2023–2025	61	5	66	6	
Charlie Raglan	England	DF	2023–2025	71	5	78	5	
James Norwood	England	FW	2023–2025	64	26	72	29	
Tom Conlon	England	MF	2024–2026	58	0	66	0	
Oliver Hammond	Wales	MF	2024–	40	0	50	0	As of end of 2025–26 season
Joe Garner	England	FW	2024–	56	10	65	14	As of end of 2025–26 season
Reagan Ogle	Australia	DF	2024–	50	2	59	4	As of end of 2025–26 season
Manny Monthe	Cameroon	DF	2024–	73	5	82	6	As of end of 2025–26 season
Josh Kay	England	MF	2024–2026	21	1	27	1	
Jes Uchegbulam	Nigeria	FW	2024–2025	27	0	35	2	
Jake Caprice	England	DF	2024–2026	66	2	74	2	
Kai Payne	England	MF	2024–2026	36	2	40	2	As of end of 2025-26 season
Kane Drummond	England	FW	2024-	47	7	53	7	As of end of 2025-26 season
Tom Pett	England	MF	2025–	61	3	67	3	As of end of 2025-26 season
Jake Leake	England	DF	2025–	26	2	28	2	As of end of 2025-26 season
Josh Hawkes	England	MF	2025–	26	5	29	5	As of end of 2025-26 season
Ryan Woods	England	DF	2025–	43	0	48	0	As of end of 2025-26 season
Jamie Robson	Scotland	DF	2025–	44	0	46	0	As of end of 2025-26 season
Donervon Daniels	Montserrat	DF	2025-	39	1	41	1	As of end of 2025-26 season
Luke Hannant	England	FW	2025-2026	25	1	30	4	
