= 1905–06 Leeds City F.C. season =

Leeds City
1905–06 season
- Secretary: Gilbert Gillies
- Stadium: Elland Road
- Second Division: 6th
- FA Cup: Third qualifying round
- Highest home attendance: 22,000 vs Bradford City, Second Division, 30 December 1905
- Lowest home attendance: 2,000 vs Chesterfield, Second Division, 27 February 1906
- Average home league attendance: 9,978
- Biggest win: 11–0 vs Morley, FA Cup, 7 October 1905
- Biggest defeat: 0–4 vs Chelsea, Second Division, 31 March 1906

The 1905–06 season was Leeds City's second season in existence and their first season in the Football League, having competed in the West Yorkshire League during the previous season. Leeds City finished sixth in the Second Division on 43 points. They also took part in the FA Cup, where they were eliminated in the Third Qualifying Round.

== Competitions ==
=== Football League Second Division ===
==== League table ====
| Pos | Team | Pld | W | D | L | GF | GA | GAv | Pts |
|---|---|---|---|---|---|---|---|---|---|
| 4 | West Bromwich Albion | 38 | 22 | 8 | 8 | 79 | 36 | 2.194 | 52 |
| 5 | Hull City | 38 | 19 | 6 | 13 | 67 | 54 | 1.241 | 44 |
| 6 | Leeds City | 38 | 17 | 9 | 12 | 59 | 47 | 1.255 | 43 |
| 7 | Leicester Fosse | 38 | 15 | 12 | 11 | 53 | 48 | 1.104 | 42 |
| 8 | Grimsby Town | 38 | 15 | 10 | 13 | 46 | 46 | 1.000 | 40 |

==== Results ====
| Win | Draw | Loss |

| Date | Opponent | Venue | Result (Note: Leeds City's score written first) | Scorers | Attendance |
|---|---|---|---|---|---|
| 2 September 1905 | Bradford City | Away | 0–1 | — | 15,000 |
| 9 September 1905 | West Bromwich Albion | Home | 0–2 | — | 6,802 |
| 11 September 1905 | Lincoln City | Home | 2–2 | Drain (2) | 3,000 |
| 16 September 1905 | Leicester Fosse | Away | 1–0 | Singleton | 5,000 |
| 23 September 1905 | Hull City | Home | 3–1 | R. Morris (2), Hargrave | 13,654 |
| 30 September 1905 | Lincoln City | Away | 2–1 | Parnell (pen.), Hargrave | 3,000 |
| 14 October 1905 | Burslem Port Vale | Away | 0–2 | — | 1,500 |
| 21 October 1905 | Barnsley | Home | 3–2 | R. Morris, Hargrave, Stacey (o.g.) | 12,000 |
| 11 November 1905 | Grimsby Town | Home | 3–0 | Hargrave (2), Stringfellow | 7,000 |
| 13 November 1905 | Burton United | Away | 1–1 | Parnell | 1,500 |
| 25 November 1905 | Chelsea | Home | 0–0 | — | 20,000 |
| 2 December 1905 | Gainsborough Trinity | Away | 1–4 | Watson | 2,000 |
| 9 December 1905 | Bristol City | Home | 1–1 | Morgan | 15,000 |
| 23 December 1905 | Glossop | Home | 1–0 | Hargrave | 9,000 |
| 26 December 1905 | Stockport County | Away | 1–2 | Singleton | 5,000 |
| 30 December 1905 | Bradford City | Home | 0–2 | — | 22,000 |
| 1 January 1906 | Blackpool | Away | 3–0 | R. Morris, Wilson, Singleton | 3,000 |
| 6 January 1906 | West Bromwich Albion | Away | 1–2 | Wilson | 2,553 |
| 15 January 1906 | Manchester United | Away | 3–0 | Watson, Wilson, Singleton | 6,000 |
| 20 January 1906 | Leicester Fosse | Home | 4–1 | Murray (pen.), Drain, Watson, Hargrave | 8,000 |
| 27 January 1906 | Hull City | Away | 0–0 | — | 10,000 |
| 3 February 1906 | Burnley | Home | 1–1 | Watson | 7,129 |
| 10 February 1906 | Chesterfield | Away | 2–0 | R. Morris, Singleton | 4,000 |
| 17 February 1906 | Burslem Port Vale | Home | 3–1 | Wilson, Hargrave, Parnell | 9,000 |
| 24 February 1906 | Barnsley | Away | 0–3 | — | 5,000 |
| 27 February 1906 | Chesterfield | Home | 3–0 | Wilson (2), Murray (pen.) | 2,000 |
| 3 March 1906 | Clapton Orient | Home | 6–1 | Wilson (4), Hargrave, Parnell | 8,000 |
| 10 March 1906 | Burnley | Away | 3–4 | Wilson (2), Singleton | 5,000 |
| 17 March 1906 | Grimsby Town | Away | 1–1 | Murray | 3,000 |
| 24 March 1906 | Burton United | Home | 2–1 | Watson, Singleton | 5,000 |
| 29 March 1906 | Clapton Orient | Away | 0–0 | — | 1,000 |
| 31 March 1906 | Chelsea | Away | 0–4 | — | 15,000 |
| 7 April 1906 | Gainsborough Trinity | Home | 1–0 | Hargrave | 12,000 |
| 13 April 1906 | Stockport County | Home | 1–1 | Lavery | 10,000 |
| 14 April 1906 | Bristol City | Away | 0–2 | — | 12,000 |
| 16 April 1906 | Blackpool | Home | 3–0 | Hargrave (2), Watson | 10,000 |
| 21 April 1906 | Manchester United | Home | 1–3 | Lavery | 10,000 |
| 28 April 1906 | Glossop | Away | 2–1 | Parnell, Wilson | 1,500 |

=== FA Cup ===
| Win | Draw | Loss |

| Round | Date | Opponent | Venue | Result | Scorers | Attendance |
|---|---|---|---|---|---|---|
| First qualifying round | 7 October 1905 | Morley | Home | 11–0 | Hargrave (4), Watson (2), R. Morris (4), Parnell | 3,000 |
| Second qualifying round | 28 October 1905 | Mexborough Town | Home | 1–1 | Hargrave | 4,000 |
| Second qualifying round replay | 2 November 1905 | Mexborough Town | Away | 1–1 | Parnell | 3,000 |
| Second qualifying round second replay | 6 November 1905 | Mexborough Town | Home | 3–1 | Watson, R. Morris, Hargrave | 5,000 |
| Third qualifying round | 22 November 1905 | Hull City | Away | 1–1 | Hargrave | 3,000 |
| Third qualifying round replay | 29 November 1905 | Hull City | Home | 1–2 | Parnell | 7,000 |
