= List of Oldham Athletic A.F.C. seasons =

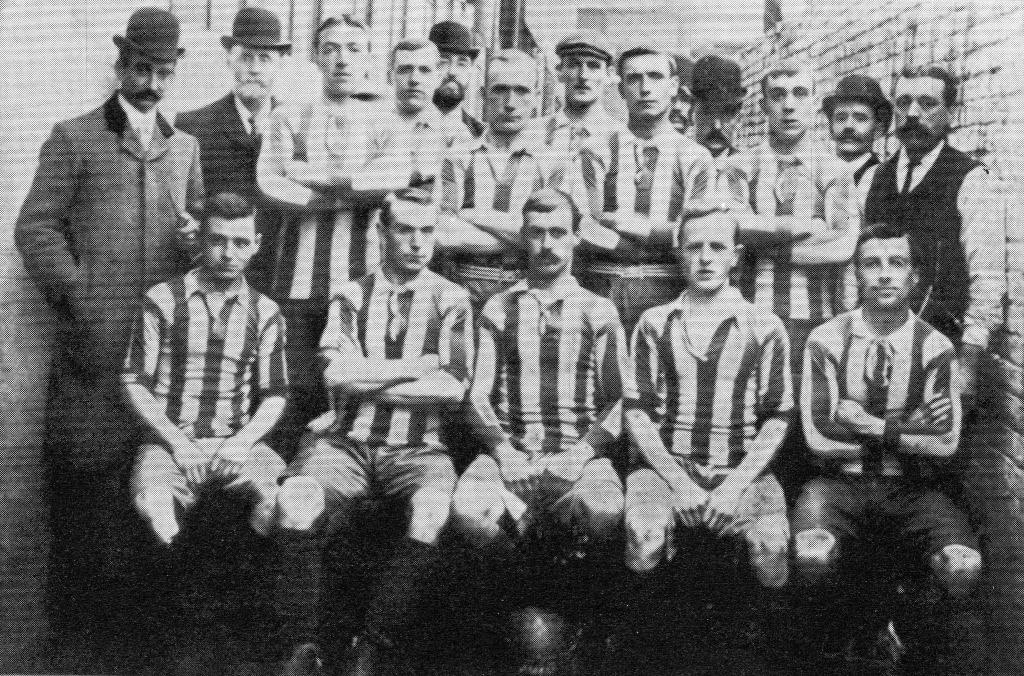
Oldham Athletic squad in 1905

This is a list of seasons completed by Oldham Athletic A.F.C. in English football, from 1904—when the club began playing professionally—to the most recent completed season. The list details accomplishments in all competitions the club has entered. The club has never participated in any major competitions outside of the United Kingdom.

== History ==
The club was created in 1899 after Pine Villa Football Club folded earlier the same year. In the early years, Oldham played mostly at the junior level of competition. In 1899, Oldham Athletic played their first game in the Manchester Alliance League versus Berry's Blacking Works Second XI. The following season, the club would move to the Manchester Football League after finishing as runners-up. The club began to play professionally in 1904 as they moved into the Lancashire Combination B Division and were immediately promoted to the A Division by finishing as runners-up.

After two seasons in the Lancashire Combination, the club gained acceptance into the Football League in June 1907 when Burslem Port Vale resigned from the league. Unlike many clubs, Oldham Athletic gained early success in the league as they finished in third place in the Football League Second Division. By 1910, the club was playing in the top flight of English football after the club had finishing in the runners-up spot in the 1909–10 season. It would not be until the 1952–53 season when the club would once again win a trophy, as they finished at the top of the Football League Third Division North table. By the late 1950s, the club was in the Football League Fourth Division and twice had to apply for re-election into the Football League, including a finish of 23rd in 1959–60, their lowest rank in the League.

By the mid-1960s, the club's fortunes had turned as they gained promotion back into the Football League Third Division. In 1973–74, Jimmy Frizzell led Oldham back to the Second Division as the club won their first league title since 1953. Unlike the previous visit into the division, the club was not relegated quickly. In the late 1970s, the club were runners-up in the Anglo-Scottish Cup following a loss to Burnley 4–2 on aggregate. Under Joe Royle in 1989–90 season, Oldham had their best finish in a major English cup by finishing as runners-up in the 1990 Football League Cup Final. The following season, Oldham won the Second Division and were promoted to the Football League First Division for the first time in 64 years and, in 1992–93, the club was a founding member of the FA Premier League.

The club was relegated back into the First Division (Note: The Second Division was renamed to the First Division following the advent of the FA Premier League. The Third Division was also renamed to Second Division.) following the 1993–94 season with Joe Royle leaving to join Everton during the next season. In the 1996–97 season, the club was relegated for the second time in four seasons and were back in the Second Division. After 21 consecutive seasons in the third tier of English football, the club were relegated to the renamed League Two for the first time since 1971. In 2021–22 they finished 23rd, 62 years after they had finished in the same position, and this time they were relegated automatically to the National League – the first former Premier League club to play non-League football.

== Seasons ==
| Season | League | | | | | | | | | FA Cup | EFL Cup (Note: The League Cup was founded in the 1960–61 season.) | EFL Trophy | Other | | Top goalscorer(s) (Note: Figures include goals include all competitions. Goals in bold show new club record.) | |
| Season | Division | P | W | D | L | GF | GA | Pts | Pos | FA Cup | EFL Cup | EFL Trophy | Other | | Name | Goals |
|---|---|---|---|---|---|---|---|---|---|---|---|---|---|---|---|---|
| 1895–04 | Unknown | | | | | | | | | | | | | | | |
| 1904–05 | Lan C-2 ↑ | 34 | 19 | 6 | 9 | 80 | 38 | 44 | 3rd | | | | | | | |
| 1905–06 | Lan C-1 | 38 | 14 | 8 | 16 | 45 | 52 | 36 | 13th | 4Q | | | | | | |
| 1906–07 | Lan C-1 ↑ | 38 | 26 | 5 | 7 | 105 | 33 | 57 | 1st | R2 | | | | | | |
| 1907–08 | Div 2 (Note: Oldham Athletic left the Lancashire Combination after gaining acceptance into the Football League.) | 38 | 22 | 6 | 10 | 76 | 42 | 50 | 3rd | R2 | | | | | Frank Newton | 29 |
| 1908–09 | Div 2 | 38 | 17 | 6 | 15 | 55 | 43 | 40 | 6th | R1 | | | | | Frank Newton | 14 |
| 1909–10 | Div 2 ↑ | 38 | 23 | 7 | 8 | 79 | 39 | 53 | 2nd | R1 | | | | | Jimmy Fay | 26 |
| 1910–11 | Div 1 | 38 | 16 | 9 | 13 | 44 | 41 | 41 | 7th | R2 | | | | | Alf Toward | 13 |
| 1911–12 | Div 1 | 38 | 12 | 10 | 16 | 46 | 54 | 34 | 18th | R3 | | | | | Evan Jones | 17 |
| 1912–13 | Div 1 | 38 | 14 | 14 | 10 | 50 | 55 | 42 | 9th | SF | | | | | Joe Walters | 13 |
| 1913–14 | Div 1 | 38 | 17 | 9 | 12 | 55 | 45 | 43 | 4th | R1 | | | | | Arthur Gee | 12 |
| 1914–15 | Div 1 | 38 | 17 | 11 | 10 | 70 | 56 | 45 | 2nd (Note: Highest League finish.) | QF | | | | | Gilbert Kemp | 19 |
| 1915–19 | No competitive football was played between 1915 and 1919 because of the First World War. | | | | | | | | | | | | | | | |
| 1919–20 | Div 1 | 42 | 15 | 8 | 19 | 49 | 52 | 38 | 17th | R1 | | | | | Arthur Gee | 13 |
| 1920–21 | Div 1 | 42 | 9 | 15 | 18 | 49 | 86 | 33 | 19th | R2 | | | | | Reuben Butler | 16 |
| 1921–22 | Div 1 | 42 | 13 | 11 | 18 | 38 | 50 | 37 | 19th | R2 | | | | | Reuben Butler | 13 |
| 1922–23 | Div 1 ↓ | 42 | 10 | 10 | 22 | 35 | 65 | 30 | 22nd | R1 | | | | | Jack Marshall | 6 |
| 1923–24 | Div 2 | 42 | 14 | 17 | 11 | 43 | 52 | 45 | 7th | R2 | | | | | John Blair | 15 |
| 1924–25 | Div 2 | 42 | 13 | 11 | 18 | 35 | 51 | 37 | 18th | R1 | | | | | Chris Jones | 6 |
| 1925–26 | Div 2 | 42 | 18 | 8 | 16 | 74 | 66 | 44 | 7th | R3 | | | | | Arthur Ormston | 23 |
| 1926–27 | Div 2 | 42 | 19 | 6 | 17 | 74 | 84 | 44 | 10th | R3 | | | | | Albert Pynegar | 19 |
| 1927–28 | Div 2 | 42 | 19 | 8 | 15 | 75 | 51 | 46 | 7th | R4 | | | | | Albert Pynegar | 19 |
| 1928–29 | Div 2 | 42 | 16 | 5 | 21 | 54 | 75 | 37 | 18th | R3 | | | | | Stewart Littlewood | 12 |
| 1929–30 | Div 2 | 42 | 21 | 11 | 10 | 90 | 51 | 53 | 3rd | R4 | | | | | Stewart Littlewood | 30 |
| 1930–31 | Div 2 | 42 | 16 | 10 | 16 | 61 | 72 | 42 | 12th | R3 | | | | | Jimmy Dyson | 15 |
| 1931–32 | Div 2 | 42 | 13 | 10 | 19 | 62 | 84 | 36 | 18th | R3 | | | | | Bill Johnstone | 12 |
| 1932–33 | Div 2 | 42 | 15 | 8 | 19 | 67 | 80 | 38 | 16th | R3 | | | | | Jimmy Pears | 12 |
| 1933–34 | Div 2 | 42 | 17 | 10 | 15 | 72 | 60 | 44 | 9th | R4 | | | | | Tommy Reid | 17 |
| 1934–35 | Div 2 ↓ | 42 | 10 | 6 | 26 | 56 | 95 | 26 | 21st | R3 | | | | | Billy Walsh | 12 |
| 1935–36 | Div 3N | 42 | 18 | 9 | 15 | 86 | 73 | 45 | 7th | R2 | | | | | Tom Davis | 35 |
| 1936–37 | Div 3N | 42 | 20 | 11 | 11 | 77 | 59 | 51 | 4th | R3 | | | | | Jack Diamond | 18 |
| 1937–38 | Div 3N | 42 | 19 | 13 | 10 | 67 | 46 | 51 | 4th | R1 | | | | | Tom Davis | 33 |
| 1938–39 | Div 3N | 42 | 22 | 5 | 15 | 76 | 59 | 49 | 5th | R1 | | | | | Ron Ferrier | 21 |
| 1939–40 | Div 3N | 3 | 1 | 0 | 2 | 3 | 5 | 2 | 18th (Note: The 1939–40 season was abandoned in early September and all results annulled, after only three matches had been played.) | – | | | | | | |
| 1939–44 | No competitive football was played between 1939 and 1945 because of the Second World War. | | | | | | | | | | | | | | | |
| 1945–46 | | | | | | | | | | R2 (Note: All FA Cup ties in 1945–46 were played on a two legged basis.) | | | | | | |
| 1946–47 | Div 3N | 42 | 12 | 8 | 22 | 55 | 80 | 32 | 19th | R2 | | | | | Fred Howe | 20 |
| 1947–48 | Div 3N | 42 | 14 | 13 | 15 | 63 | 64 | 41 | 11th | R2 | | | | | Blackshaw/Haddington | 17 |
| 1948–49 | Div 3N | 42 | 18 | 9 | 15 | 75 | 67 | 45 | 6th | R2 | | | | | Eric Gemmell | 23 |
| 1949–50 | Div 3N | 42 | 16 | 11 | 15 | 58 | 63 | 43 | 11th | R3 | | | | | Ray Haddington | 24 |
| 1950–51 | Div 3N | 42 | 16 | 8 | 22 | 73 | 73 | 40 | 15th | R3 | | | | | Eric Gemmell | 22 |
| 1951–52 | Div 3N | 42 | 24 | 9 | 13 | 90 | 61 | 57 | 4th | R2 | | | | | Eric Gemmell | 29 |
| 1952–53 | Div 3N ↑ | 46 | 22 | 15 | 9 | 77 | 45 | 59 | 1st | R3 | | | | | Eric Gemmell | 23 |
| 1953–54 | Div 2 ↓ | 42 | 8 | 9 | 25 | 40 | 89 | 25 | 22nd | R3 | | | | | Frank Scrine | 9 |
| 1954–55 | Div 3N | 46 | 19 | 10 | 17 | 74 | 68 | 48 | 10th | R2 | | | | | Don Travis | 30 |
| 1955–56 | Div 3N | 46 | 10 | 18 | 18 | 76 | 86 | 38 | 20th | R1 | | | | | Don Travis | 15 |
| 1956–57 | Div 3N | 46 | 12 | 15 | 19 | 66 | 74 | 39 | 19th | R2 | | | | | Don Travis | 14 |
| 1957–58 | Div 3N | 46 | 14 | 17 | 15 | 72 | 84 | 45 | 15th | R2 | | | | | Gerry Duffy | 17 |
| 1958–59 | Div 4 (Note: Having finished in the lower half of the table, Oldham Athletic were placed in the new Football League Fourth Division following the amalgamation of the Third Division North and Third Division South.) | 46 | 16 | 4 | 26 | 59 | 84 | 36 | 21st | R3 | | | | | Peter Phoenix | 14 |
| 1959–60 | Div 4 | 46 | 8 | 12 | 26 | 41 | 83 | 28 | 23rd | R2 | | | | | Peter Stringfellow | 11 |
| 1960–61 | Div 4 | 46 | 19 | 7 | 20 | 79 | 88 | 45 | 12th | R2 | R2 | | | | Bert Lister | 21 |
| 1961–62 | Div 4 | 44 | 17 | 12 | 15 | 77 | 70 | 46 | 11th | R4 | R1 | | | | Jimmy Frizzell | 25 |
| 1962–63 | Div 4 ↑ | 46 | 24 | 11 | 11 | 95 | 60 | 59 | 2nd | R1 | R2 | | | | Bert Lister | 33 |
| 1963–64 | Div 3 | 46 | 20 | 8 | 18 | 73 | 40 | 48 | 9th | R3 | R1 | | | | Bert Lister | 17 |
| 1964–65 | Div 3 | 46 | 13 | 10 | 23 | 61 | 83 | 36 | 20th | R3 | R2 | | | | Jimmy Frizzell | 11 |
| 1965–66 | Div 3 | 46 | 12 | 13 | 21 | 55 | 81 | 37 | 20th | R3 | R2 | | | | Ian Towers | 10 |
| 1966–67 | Div 3 | 46 | 19 | 10 | 17 | 80 | 63 | 48 | 10th | R3 | R1 | | | | Ian Towers | 27 |
| 1967–68 | Div 3 | 46 | 18 | 7 | 21 | 60 | 65 | 43 | 16th | R1 | R1 | | | | Bob Ledger | 11 |
| 1968–69 | Div 3 ↓ | 46 | 13 | 9 | 24 | 50 | 83 | 35 | 24th | R1 | R1 | | | | Keith Bebbington | 13 |
| 1969–70 | Div 4 | 46 | 13 | 13 | 20 | 60 | 65 | 39 | 19th | R2 | R1 | | | | David Shaw | 12 |
| 1970–71 | Div 4 ↑ | 46 | 24 | 11 | 11 | 88 | 63 | 59 | 3rd | R1 | R2 | | | | Jim Fryatt | 26 |
| 1971–72 | Div 3 | 46 | 17 | 11 | 18 | 59 | 63 | 45 | 11th | R1 | R2 | | | | David Shaw | 19 |
| 1972–73 | Div 3 | 46 | 19 | 16 | 11 | 72 | 54 | 54 | 4th | R1 | R1 | | | | David Shaw | 18 |
| 1973–74 | Div 3 ↑ | 46 | 25 | 12 | 9 | 83 | 47 | 62 | 1st | R4 | R1 | | | | Colin Garwood | 17 |
| 1974–75 | Div 2 | 42 | 10 | 15 | 17 | 40 | 48 | 35 | 18th | R3 | R1 | | | | Ian Robins | 10 |
| 1975–76 | Div 2 | 42 | 13 | 12 | 17 | 57 | 68 | 38 | 17th | R3 | R2 | | | | David Shaw | 13 |
| 1976–77 | Div 2 | 42 | 14 | 10 | 18 | 52 | 64 | 38 | 13th | R5 | R1 | | | | Vic Halom | 22 |
| 1977–78 | Div 2 | 42 | 13 | 16 | 13 | 54 | 58 | 42 | 8th | R3 | R3 | | ASC | GS | Steve Taylor | 21 |
| 1978–79 | Div 2 | 42 | 13 | 13 | 16 | 52 | 61 | 39 | 14th | R5 | R2 | | ASC | RU | Alan Young | 14 |
| 1979–80 | Div 2 | 42 | 16 | 11 | 15 | 49 | 53 | 43 | 11th | R5 | R2 | | | | Simon Stainrod | 11 |
| 1980–81 | Div 2 | 42 | 12 | 15 | 15 | 39 | 48 | 39 | 15th | R3 | R2 | | | | Rodger Wylde | 12 |
| 1981–82 | Div 2 | 42 | 15 | 14 | 13 | 50 | 51 | 59 (Note: The 1981–82 season saw the introduction of three points for a win.) | 11th | R3 | R3 | | | | Rodger Wylde | 17 |
| 1982–83 | Div 2 | 42 | 14 | 19 | 9 | 64 | 47 | 61 | 7th | R3 | R2 | | | | Rodger Wylde | 19 |
| 1983–84 | Div 2 | 42 | 13 | 8 | 21 | 47 | 73 | 47 | 19th | R3 | R3 | | | | Roger Palmer | 14 |
| 1984–85 | Div 2 | 42 | 15 | 8 | 19 | 49 | 67 | 53 | 14th | R4 | R1 | | | | Micky Quinn | 25 |
| 1985–86 | Div 2 | 42 | 17 | 9 | 16 | 62 | 61 | 60 | 8th | R4 | R2 | | | | Ron Futcher | 17 |
| 1986–87 | Div 2 | 42 | 22 | 9 | 11 | 65 | 44 | 75 | 3rd | R3 | R3 | | P-O | SF | Roger Palmer | 17 |
| 1987–88 | Div 2 | 44 | 18 | 11 | 15 | 72 | 64 | 65 | 10th | R3 | R4 | | | | Palmer/Ritchie | 20 |
| 1988–89 | Div 2 | 46 | 11 | 21 | 14 | 75 | 72 | 54 | 16th | R3 | R3 | | | | Andy Ritchie | 16 |
| 1989–90 | Div 2 | 46 | 19 | 14 | 13 | 70 | 57 | 71 | 8th | SF | RU | | | | Andy Ritchie | 28 |
| 1990–91 | Div 2 ↑ | 46 | 25 | 13 | 8 | 83 | 53 | 88 | 1st | R4 | R3 | | | | Ian Marshall | 18 |
| 1991–92 | Div 1 | 42 | 14 | 9 | 19 | 63 | 57 | 51 | 17th | R3 | R4 | | | | Graeme Sharp | 16 |
| 1992–93 | Prem (Note: Founding member of FA Premier League.) | 42 | 13 | 10 | 19 | 63 | 74 | 49 | 19th | R3 | R4 | | | | Ian Olney | 13 |
| 1993–94 | Prem ↓ | 42 | 9 | 13 | 20 | 42 | 68 | 40 | 21st | SF | R4 | | | | Graeme Sharp | 11 |
| 1994–95 | Div 1 | 46 | 16 | 13 | 17 | 60 | 60 | 61 | 14th | R4 | R3 | | | | Sean McCarthy | 18 |
| 1995–96 | Div 1 | 46 | 14 | 14 | 18 | 54 | 50 | 56 | 18th | R4 | R2 | | AIC | GS | Richardson/McCarthy | 11 |
| 1996–97 | Div 1 ↓ | 46 | 10 | 13 | 23 | 51 | 66 | 43 | 23rd | R3 | R3 | | | | Stuart Barlow | 12 |
| 1997–98 | Div 2 | 46 | 15 | 16 | 15 | 62 | 54 | 61 | 13th | R3 | R1 | R1 | | | Stuart Barlow | 13 |
| 1998–99 | Div 2 | 46 | 14 | 9 | 23 | 48 | 66 | 51 | 20th | R3 | R1 | R1 | | | Mark Allott | 8 |
| 1999–00 | Div 2 | 46 | 16 | 12 | 18 | 50 | 55 | 60 | 14th | R3 | R1 | R2 | | | Allott/Whitehall | 11 |
| 2000–01 | Div 2 | 46 | 15 | 13 | 18 | 53 | 65 | 58 | 15th | R2 | R2 | R1 | | | Lee Duxbury | 10 |
| 2001–02 | Div 2 | 46 | 18 | 16 | 12 | 77 | 65 | 70 | 9th | R3 | R2 | SF(N) | | | David Eyres | 14 |
| 2002–03 | Div 2 | 46 | 22 | 16 | 8 | 66 | 38 | 82 | 5th | R2 | R4 | R1 | P-O | SF | David Eyres | 16 |
| 2003–04 | Div 2 | 46 | 12 | 21 | 13 | 66 | 60 | 57 | 15th | R2 | R1 | R2 | | | Scott Vernon | 15 |
| 2004–05 | Lge 1 (Note: The Second Division was renamed to League One following advent of the Championship.) | 46 | 14 | 10 | 22 | 60 | 73 | 52 | 19th | R4 | R2 | F(N) | | | Chris Killen | 15 |
| 2005–06 | Lge 1 | 46 | 18 | 11 | 17 | 58 | 60 | 65 | 10th | R2 | R1 | R1 | | | Luke Beckett | 18 |
| 2006–07 | Lge 1 | 46 | 21 | 12 | 13 | 69 | 47 | 75 | 6th | R3 | R1 | R2 | P-O | SF | Chris Porter | 22 |
| 2007–08 | Lge 1 | 46 | 18 | 13 | 15 | 58 | 46 | 67 | 8th | R4 | R2 | R2 | | | Craig Davies | 14 |
| 2008–09 | Lge 1 | 46 | 16 | 17 | 13 | 66 | 65 | 65 | 10th | R1 | R2 | R1 | | | Lee Hughes | 18 |
| 2009–10 | Lge 1 | 46 | 13 | 13 | 20 | 39 | 57 | 52 | 16th | R1 | R1 | R1 | | | Paweł Abbott | 13 |
| 2010–11 | Lge 1 | 46 | 13 | 17 | 16 | 53 | 60 | 56 | 17th | R1 | R1 | R1 | | | Chris Taylor | 11 |
| 2011–12 | Lge 1 | 46 | 14 | 12 | 20 | 50 | 66 | 54 | 16th | R3 | R1 | F(N) | | | Shefki Kuqi | 16 |
| 2012–13 | Lge 1 | 46 | 14 | 9 | 23 | 46 | 59 | 51 | 19th | R5 | R1 | R1 | | | Jose Baxter | 15 |
| 2013–14 | Lge 1 | 46 | 14 | 14 | 18 | 50 | 59 | 56 | 15th | R3 | R1 | SF(N) | | | Danny Philliskirk | 12 |
| 2014–15 | Lge 1 | 46 | 14 | 15 | 17 | 54 | 67 | 57 | 15th | R2 | R1 | QF(N) | | | Jonathan Forte | 12 |
| 2015–16 | Lge 1 | 46 | 12 | 18 | 16 | 44 | 58 | 54 | 17th | R1 | R1 | R1N | | | Danny Philliskirk | 7 |
| 2016–17 | Lge 1 | 46 | 12 | 17 | 17 | 31 | 44 | 53 | 17th | R2 | R2 | R3 | | | Lee Erwin | 10 |
| 2017–18 | Lge 1 ↓ | 46 | 11 | 17 | 18 | 58 | 75 | 50 | 21st | R1 | R1 | QF | | | Eoin Doyle | 14 |
| 2018–19 | Lge 2 | 46 | 16 | 14 | 16 | 67 | 60 | 62 | 14th | R4 | R1 | R2 | | | Callum Lang | 16 |
| 2019–20 | Lge 2 | 37 | 9 | 14 | 14 | 44 | 57 | 41 | 19th (Note: The 2019–20 season was curtailed due to the COVID-19 pandemic, with league positions decided on a points-per-game basis. Oldham Athletic averaged 1.11 points from 37 games.) | R2 | R1 | R1 | | | Jonny Smith | 11 |
| 2020–21 | Lge 2 | 46 | 15 | 9 | 22 | 72 | 81 | 54 | 18th | R3 | R2 | R2 | | | Conor McAleny | 21 |
| 2021–22 | Lge 2 ↓ | 46 | 9 | 11 | 26 | 46 | 75 | 38 | 23rd | R1 | R3 | R2 | | | Davis Keillor-Dunn | 17 |
| 2022–23 | NL | 46 | 16 | 13 | 17 | 63 | 64 | 61 | 12th (Note: Lowest League finish.) | R1 | — (Note: Ineligible to compete after relegation from the EFL.) | — (Note: Ineligible to compete after relegation from the EFL.) | FAT | R4 | Mike Fondop | 13 |
| 2023–24 | NL | 46 | 15 | 18 | 13 | 63 | 60 | 63 | 10th | R1 | — | — | FAT | R4 | James Norwood | 18 |
| 2024–25 | NL ↑ | 46 | 19 | 16 | 11 | 64 | 48 | 73 | 5th | R2 | — | — | P-O | 1st | Mike Fondop | 20 |
| 2025–26 | Lge 2 | 46 | 18 | 14 | 14 | 60 | 44 | 68 | 10th | R2 | PR | R1 | | | Michael Mellon | 10 |

== Key ==
- P – Played
- W – Games won
- D – Games drawn
- L – Games lost
- F – Goals for
- A – Goals against
- Pts – Points
- Pos – Final position
- Lan C-1 – Lancashire Combination A Division
- Lan C-2 – Lancashire Combination B Division
- Div 1 – Football League First Division
- Div 2 – Football League Second Division
- Div 3 – Football League Third Division
- Div 3N – Football League Third Division North
- Div 4 – Football League Fourth Division
- Prem – Premier League
- Champ – Football League Championship
- Lge 1 – Football League One
- Lge 2 – Football League Two
- NL – National League
- P-O - Play-offs
- ASC – Anglo-Scottish Cup
- AIC – Anglo-Italian Cup
- FAT – FA Trophy
- GS – Group stage
- R1 – First round
- R2 – Second round
- R3 – Third round
- R4 – Fourth round
- R5 – Fifth round
- QF – Quarter-finals
- SF – Semi-finals
- F – Regional final
- RU – Runners-up
- W – Winners
- (N) – Northern section of regionalised stage

| Champions | Runners-up | Promoted | Relegated |

Division shown in bold when it changes due to promotion or relegation.

== Overall ==
- Seasons spent at Level 1 of the football league system: 12
- Seasons spent at Level 2 of the football league system: 36
- Seasons spent at Level 3 of the football league system: 46 (Note: Includes a season abandoned as a result of the Second World War.)
- Seasons spent at Level 4 of the football league system: 11 (Note: Includes a season abandoned as a result of the COVID-19 pandemic.)
- Seasons spent below the English Football League: 13
