= Dickie Morris =

Welsh footballer

- Morris as a Liverpool player

Personal information
- Full name: Richard Morris
- Date of birth: 1 January 1879
- Place of birth: Newtown, Wales
- Date of death: Unknown
- Position: Inside forward

Senior career*
Years	Team	Apps	(Gls)
1902	Newtown	?	(?)
1902	Druids	?	(?)
1902–1905	Liverpool	38	(5)
1905–1906	Leeds City	25	(5)
1906–1907	Grimsby Town	24	(7)
1907–1908	Plymouth Argyle	35	(9)
1908	Reading	?	(?)
1908–1909	Huddersfield Town	?	(?)
Total		122	(26)

International career
1902–1908	Wales	11	(1)
- * Club domestic league appearances and goals

Richard Morris (born 1 January 1879) was a Welsh footballer who played as an inside forward. He made 87 appearances in the Football League for Liverpool, Leeds City and Grimsby Town. He also played in the Southern League for Plymouth Argyle and Reading. He was capped eleven times by the Wales national team, scoring one goal. Morris served the British Army as a soldier during the Second Boer War.

== Early life ==
Morris was born in Newtown. He joined the British Army when he was a teenager and saw active service in the Second Boer War, which took place between 1899 and 1902. When the conflict was nearing its end, Morris returned to Wales to begin his football career.

== Club career ==
He signed with Newtown, who were a founding member of the Football Association of Wales, and was called up to win a first cap for his country soon after joining the club. In March 1902, he left Newtown in order to join Druids, however his time with the club was brief and by the end of the month he had signed for Football League First Division champions Liverpool. Described in a club programme as "one of the trickiest players who ever kicked a ball", Morris made his debut in a 1–0 home win against Bury on 19 April. Over the next three years, Morris made 38 league appearances for Liverpool, scoring five goals. Two of them came in a Merseyside derby against Everton on 10 October 1903, which earned them a point in a 2–2 draw at Anfield. The club was relegated at the end of that season and Morris was restricted to seven league appearances in the next campaign, where the club won promotion back to the First Division as Second Division champions.

In the summer of 1905, Morris left Liverpool to sign for newly elected English Football League club Leeds City. The Yorkshire Post hailed his signing as a major coup, describing him as a "clever exponent of the forward game". He made his debut in a 1–0 defeat at Bradford City on 2 September 1905, and scored his first goals for the club three weeks later in a 3–1 win against Hull City at Elland Road. "Singleton and Morris were a capital left wing pair," said the Yorkshire Post. On 7 October, he scored four goals as City defeated Morley 11–0 in the first qualifying round of the FA Cup. In March 1905, Morris became the first Leeds City player to appear in a senior international when he won his ninth cap for Wales. Having made 31 league and cup appearances during the 1905–06 campaign, scoring ten goals, he left the club in June to sign for Grimsby Town.

In his one season with Grimsby, Morris scored seven goals in 24 Second Division matches, and his form for the club earned him a recall to the Wales squad in February 1907. He joined his fourth professional club in the summer of 1907 when he signed with Southern League side Plymouth Argyle. He made his debut in a 1–0 win at Northampton Town on 2 September and scored his first goal in a 4–0 win at Crystal Palace twelve days later. In April 1908, Morris became the first Plymouth Argyle player to be capped in a senior international. At the end of the 1907–08 season, Morris moved on again, having helped the club finish second in the Southern League. He made 37 appearances in all competitions for Argyle, scoring 10 goals. He had a brief spell with Reading in 1908 before joining newly founded North Eastern League club Huddersfield Town. Having spent one season in Yorkshire, Morris retired at the end of the 1908–09 campaign. There is circumstantial evidence to suggest he came out of retirement to join Merthyr Town in February 1910 and played a few games for them in the Southern League Division 2 (Section A), making his debut at Aberdare on 12 February 1910.

== International career ==
Morris received his first call-up to the Wales national team in February 1902. He won his first cap in a 3–0 defeat against Ireland on 22 February at Arms Park. He retained his place in the side for their next match a few weeks later, a 0–0 draw with England, where Dick Roose saved a penalty for the Welsh. He made six more appearances over the next two years before losing his place in the squad. He was recalled in March 1906 and played in a 2–0 win against Scotland at Tynecastle. He scored his first goal for Wales the following year in a 3–2 win against Ireland on 23 February 1907 which helped the team win their first British Home Championship title. His final appearance came on 11 April 1908 in a 1–0 defeat to Ireland at Aberdare Athletic Ground.
