= James Fay =

James Fay may refer to:

- James H. Fay (1899–1948), American lawyer and Democratic politician
- James Bernard Fay (born 1947), Canadian farmer
- James Fay, appeared on Finding Bigfoot
- Jimmy Fay (1884–1957), English footballer
