= James Mallon =

James Mallon may refer to:

- James Joseph Mallon (1874-1961), British economist and political activist
- Jimmy Mallon (1938-2012), Scottish footballer
- Jim Mallon (born 1956), American television and film producer and writer
