= David Teece (disambiguation) =

David Teece may refer to:

- David Teece (footballer) (1927–2007), English footballer, see List of Oldham Athletic A.F.C. players (25–99 appearances)
- David Teece (born 1948), New Zealand-born US-based organizational economist
