= Joseph Stafford =

Joseph Stafford may refer to:

- Joseph Stafford (zoologist) (1864-1925), Canadian helminthologist, malacologist, and marine biologist
- Joe Stafford (1879-1957), English footballer, see 1907–08 Oldham Athletic A.F.C. season
- Joe Stafford (1918-2000), Gaelic footballer
- Joseph Stafford, American diplomat, see Canadian Caper
