= Thomas Eaves =

Thomas Eaves may refer to:

- Bert Eaves (1914-2001), (Thomas Albert Eaves), English footballer, see List of Oldham Athletic A.F.C. players (25–99 appearances)
- Tom Eaves (born 1992), English footballer
