= Linfoot =

Linfoot is a surname. Notable people with the surname include:

- Dan Linfoot (born 1988), British superbike rider
- Edward Linfoot (1905–1982), British mathematician
- Fred Linfoot (1901–1979), English footballer
- William R. Linfoot, American polo player

== See also ==
- Linafoot
