= Arthur Wainwright =

English footballer

Personal information
- Full name: Arthur Henry Wainwright
- Date of birth: November 1894
- Place of birth: Tinsley, South Yorkshire, England
- Date of death: 18 January 1961 (aged 66)
- Place of death: Middlesbrough
- Height: 5 ft 9 in (1.75 m)
- Position: Winger

Senior career*
| Years | Team | Apps | (Gls) |
| 1917–1918 | Tinsley Working Mens Club | | |
| 1918–1919 | Leeds City | 0 | (0) |
| 1919–1920 | Grimsby Town | 8 | (2) |
| 1920–1922 | Gresley Rovers | | |
| 1922–1924 | Bristol Rovers | 16 | (0) |
| 1924–1925 | Barrow | 34 | (3) |
| 1925–1930 | Hednesford Town | | |
| 1930 | Walsall LMS | | |
| 1930–1931 | Bloxwich Strollers | | |
| 1931 | Scarborough | | |
| 1931–193? | Grimsby Town | | |
- * Club domestic league appearances and goals

Arthur Henry Wainwright (November 1894 – 18 January 1968) was an English professional footballer who played as a winger.
