= Frank Chipperfield =

English footballer

Personal information
- Full name: Francis Chipperfield
- Date of birth: 2 December 1895
- Place of birth: Shiremoor, England
- Date of death: 1979 (aged 83–84)
- Position: Winger

Senior career*
Years	Team	Apps	(Gls)
1912–1913	Bates United		
1913–1914	South Shields		
1914–1915	Blyth Spartans		
1919	Leeds City	0	(0)
1919–1920	Lincoln City	23	(0)
1920–1921	Middlesbrough	1	(0)
1921–1922	Blyth Spartans		
1922–1923	Carlisle United		
1923–1929	Ashington	164	(9)
1929	Frickley Colliery		
Total		188	(9)
- * Club domestic league appearances and goals

Francis Chipperfield (2 December 1895 – 1979) was an English footballer who played in the Football League for Ashington, Lincoln City and Middlesbrough.
