= Willis Walker =

English footballer and cricketer

Personal information
- Date of birth: 24 November 1892
- Place of birth: Gosforth, Northumberland, England
- Date of death: 3 December 1991 (aged 99)
- Place of death: Keighley, West Yorkshire, England
- Height: 5 ft 10 in (1.78 m)
- Position: Goalkeeper

Senior career*
Years	Team	Apps	(Gls)
1911–1912	Sheffield United	0	(0)
1912–1914	Doncaster Rovers	36	(0)
1914–1919	Leeds City	22	(0)
1919–1925	South Shields	192	(0)
1925–1926	Bradford Park Avenue	34	(0)
1926–1927	Stockport County	19	(0)
Total		303	(0)
- * Club domestic league appearances and goals

Willis Walker (24 November 1892 − 3 December 1991) was an English footballer and County Cricketer. He played as a goalkeeper in the Football League for Leeds City, South Shields, Bradford Park Avenue and Stockport County. As a Nottinghamshire County cricketer, he was predominantly a batsman, scoring over a thousand first-class runs in a season on ten occasions.

== Football career ==
Walker began his career at Sheffield United in 1911, though never made it into the first team. In 1912 he was bought by Midland League Doncaster Rovers where he started off as understudy to Harry Bromage, and took over as first choice keeper for the 1913–14 season when he appeared in all 36 league fixtures.

Second Division Leeds City signed him in May 1914, but after 14 appearances the onset of war temporarily ended Football League matches. He played for Leeds during the war when he was able to, on 70 occasions altogether. When competition recommenced after the war, Walker was back in the side until Leeds City were suspended from the league.

In an auction of former Leeds players in 1919, Walker was bought for £800 by newly elected Second Division team South Shields and went on to play 201 league and FA Cup games for them over the nearly six seasons he was there.

Latterly he played for Bradford Park Avenue during the 1925–26 season and finished his career at Stockport County the following season.

== Cricket career ==
Willis Walker
Cricket information
- Batting: Right-handed
- Bowling: Right-arm medium
- Role: Batsman

Domestic team information
- Years: Team
- 1913–1937: Nottinghamshire

Career statistics
Competition	FC
Matches	406
Runs scored	18,259
Batting average	32.37
100s/50s	31/101
Top score	165*
Balls bowled	126
Wickets	2
Bowling average	48.50
5 wickets in innings	0
10 wickets in match	0
Best bowling	2/20
Catches/stumpings	110/–
- Source: ESPNcricinfo, 27 December 2024

Walker's cricket began at Sheffield United Cricket Club whilst he was playing football for Sheffield United. He later played county cricket for Nottinghamshire, making his debut in 1913, and going on to score 18,259 runs before ending his time with the county club in 1937. On joining the club he cut two years off his age as well as claiming he was born in the county. Despite a successful career he never played for England.

== Personal life ==
Born in Gosforth, Northumberland, as a boy he moved south to the Wiseton Estate, near Retford, Nottinghamshire when his father found work there. During the First World War, he served in the Royal Navy.

In 1919 Walker began selling football, cricket and tennis equipment from his home in Keighley. This business soon moved to a series of shops in the town where his son and then grandsons later took over, until its closure in 2012.

Willis Walker died in East Morton near Keighley in 1991 aged 99.
