= Bill Hopkins (footballer, born 1888) =

English footballer (1888–1938)

Personal information
- Full name: William Hopkins
- Date of birth: 11 November 1888
- Place of birth: Esh Winning, England
- Date of death: 26 January 1938 (aged 49)
- Place of death: Blackpool, England
- Height: 5 ft 9 in (1.75 m)
- Position: Centre half

Senior career*
| Years | Team | Apps | (Gls) |
| 1904–1907 | Esh Winning Rangers | | |
| 1907–1910 | Crook Town | | |
| 1910–1911 | Esh Winning Rangers | | |
| 1911–1912 | Stanley United | | |
| 1912–1919 | Sunderland | 10 | (0) |
| 1919 | Leeds City | 7 | (0) |
| 1919–1921 | South Shields | 61 | (2) |
| 1921–1923 | Hartlepools United | 53 | (1) |
| 1923–1925 | Durham City | 52 | (3) |
- * Club domestic league appearances and goals

William Hopkins (11 November 1888 – 26 January 1938), commonly known as Bill, Pop, or Tot Hopkins, was an English professional footballer who made 183 appearances in the Football League playing as a centre half for Sunderland, Leeds City, South Shields, Hartlepools United and Durham City. After his playing career finished, he worked as a trainer with several Football League clubs.

== Life and career ==
William Hopkins was born on 11 November 1888 in Esh Winning, County Durham, the son of Frederick William Hopkins, a coal miner, and his wife, Margaret. The 1911 Census shows the 22-year-old Hopkins living with his parents and three younger sisters in Esh Winning and working as a colliery blacksmith. He played football for his local team, Esh Winning Rangers, from around 1904 until signing for Crook Town of the Northern League in 1907. The following year, he had trials with several Football League clubs, which came to nothing, and he returned to Esh Winning Rangers. In 1911 he returned to Northern League football with Stanley United, and his performances over the season earned him a contract with First Division club Sunderland.

Hopkins had played as a centre forward for Stanley, but at Sunderland, he was tried at centre half for the reserves and found well suited to that position. He made his first-team debut on 13 September 1913 away to Liverpool in the centre of a half-back line reshuffled because of an injury to wing half Harry Low, and, according to the Athletic News, he "played a very prominent part in the [3–1] victory which was achieved." He kept his place for the next two matches, both wins, and made three more appearances in the second half of the season. Hopkins played in four more league matches in 1914–15 – all wins – before competitive football was suspended for the duration of the First World War.

When League football resumed, Hopkins signed for Leeds City for a £50 fee. He had played in seven of the first eight 1919–20 Second Division fixtures when, in mid-October 1919, a committee of inquiry into allegations that the club had made illegal payments to its players during the war ruled that its officials' failure to co-operate with that inquiry was "so serious that the expulsion from the League can be the only fitting punishment." Along with the club's physical assets, the players were auctioned off to the highest bidder. Hopkins went to another Second Division club, South Shields, for £600. Hopkins played regularly at centre-half as South Shields finished in ninth place in their first season in the Football League and was retained for the next. He scored his first league goal in October 1920, in a match that South Shields, the only unbeaten team in the Football League, lost 5–4 to a Rotherham County side whose centre-forward had been "subdued ... to impotence" by Hopkins in the reverse fixture the previous week. He missed the last month of the season with injury, and was not retained.

In June 1921, Hartlepools United of the newly formed Football League Third Division North paid a "substantial" transfer fee for Hopkins. He was appointed captain, played at centre-half in the club's first Football League fixture, a 2–0 win away to Wrexham, and continued as a regular selection. He missed a few weeks with influenza in early 1922, and despite a rumour that he was about to leave the club, he was ever-present for the rest of the season. Hopkins played regularly for the first half of the 1922–23 season before losing his place to Walker Hampson, and he was listed for transfer at a fee of £50. However, when another Third Division club, Durham City, approached Hartlepools United, the directors agreed to let Hopkins leave on a free transfer. A pre-season profile suggested that the Durham club, whose financial situation meant their playing staff was about 80% amateur, were signing "the right sort" of professional player, which included the "experienced and clever" Hopkins. He missed only four league matches during the 1923–24 season and scored three goals. He was appointed player-coach for 1924–25. Although he lost his place as first-team centre-half to Joe Robson, he continued to contribute as coach and reserve-team player until the end of the season, at which point, at the age of nearly 37, he retired from playing.

Hopkins was appointed assistant trainer at Sheffield Wednesday in July 1927. After three and a half years with Wednesday, he joined Second Division club Charlton Athletic as trainer before leaving them after six months to take up the vacancy as trainer to First Division Grimsby Town. Grimsby were relegated in his first season, and in October 1932, he was released to accept the offer of a return to Charlton Athletic; Grimsby replaced him with Herbert Woods, who had trained the team when they were promoted three years earlier.

After a few months with Port Vale as assistant trainer, Hopkins took over from George Holley as trainer to Barnsley in July 1936. On 21 January 1938, while preparing the Barnsley players for an FA Cup match against Manchester United, he collapsed in the steam room at the team's hotel in Blackpool. He was admitted to the town's Victoria Hospital, where he died five days later. He and his wife, Amelia née Ellis, had two sons.

== Career statistics ==
Appearances and goals by club, season and competition
| Club | Season | League | | | FA Cup | | Total | |
| Club | Season | Division | Apps | Goals | Apps | Goals | Apps | Goals |
|---|---|---|---|---|---|---|---|---|
| Sunderland | 1912–13 | First Division | 0 | 0 | 0 | 0 | 0 | 0 |
| Sunderland | 1913–14 | First Division | 6 | 0 | 0 | 0 | 6 | 0 |
| Sunderland | 1914–15 | First Division | 4 | 0 | 0 | 0 | 4 | 0 |
| Sunderland | Total | | 10 | 0 | 0 | 0 | 10 | 0 |
| Leeds City | 1919–20 | Second Division | 7 | 0 | — | | 7 | 0 |
| South Shields | 1919–20 | Second Division | 26 | 0 | 2 | 0 | 28 | 0 |
| South Shields | 1920–21 | Second Division | 35 | 2 | 2 | 0 | 37 | 2 |
| South Shields | Total | | 61 | 2 | 4 | 0 | 65 | 2 |
| Hartlepools United | 1921–22 | Third Division North | 33 | 0 | 1 | 0 | 34 | 0 |
| Hartlepools United | 1922–23 | Third Division North | 20 | 1 | 2 | 0 | 22 | 1 |
| Hartlepools United | Total | | 53 | 1 | 3 | 0 | 56 | 1 |
| Durham City | 1923–24 | Third Division North | 38 | 3 | 3 | 1 | 41 | 4 |
| Durham City | 1924–25 | Third Division North | 14 | 0 | 2 | 1 | 16 | 1 |
| Durham City | Total | | 52 | 3 | 5 | 2 | 57 | 5 |
| Total | | | 183 | 6 | 12 | 2 | 195 | 8 |

== Sources ==
- Dykes, Garth (2010). Durham City FC in the Football League. Nottingham: SoccerData. ISBN 978-1-905891-42-9.
