= Frederick Newton (cricketer) =

English cricketer

Personal information
- Full name: Frederick Arthur Newton
- Born: 16 September 1890; Denaby, Yorkshire, England
- Died: 8 August 1924 (aged 33); Warsop, Nottinghamshire, England
- Batting: Right-handed
- Bowling: Leg-break
- Relatives: Frank Newton (brother)

Domestic team information
- Years: Team
- 1909–1919: Derbyshire
- FC debut: 26 July 1909 Derbyshire v Northamptonshire
- Last FC: 19 May 1919 Derbyshire v Lancashire

Career statistics
| Competition | First-class |
|---|---|
| Matches | 20 |
| Runs scored | 422 |
| Batting average | 13.61 |
| 100s/50s | 0/1 |
| Top score | 87 |
| Balls bowled | 12 |
| Wickets | 0 |
| Bowling average | – |
| 5 wickets in innings | – |
| 10 wickets in match | – |
| Best bowling | – |
| Catches/stumpings | 7/– |
- Source: CricketArchive, July 2012

Frederick Arthur Newton (16 September 1890 – 8 August 1924) was an English cricketer who played first-class cricket for Derbyshire between 1909 and 1919.

Newton was born at Denaby Main, Yorkshire. He was an all-round sportsman and played twice as goalkeeper for Chesterfield F.C. in 1905/6 and 1906/7, and later played football for Whitwell St Lawrence. He made his cricket debut for Derbyshire in the 1909 season in July against Northamptonshire when he made 30 in his first innings. He only played one more match that season. In the 1910 season he played a dozen matches. Against Warwickshire he achieved his best first-class score of 87 in the first innings. In the second innings of this match Arnold Warren and John Chapman achieved a record 9th wicket stand. Newton played two games in the 1911 season, three in the 1912 season and a final game in the 1919 season.

Newton was a right-hand batsman and played 37 innings in 20 first-class matches with an average of 13.61 and a top score of 87. He was a leg-break bowler and bowled two overs for the loss of 21 runs without taking a wicket.

Newton was killed by a roof fall at the Staveley Coal and Iron Company's Warsop Main Colliery, Nottinghamshire at the age of 33.

Newton's elder brother known as Frank Newton played centre forward for Chesterfield FC on 98 occasions, and scored 23 goals from 1902 to 1905. He played for four other clubs and also played internationally for Wales.
