= James Hamilton (footballer, born 1884) =

English footballer

Personal information
- Full name: James Hamilton
- Date of birth: 1884
- Place of birth: Burslem, Stoke-on-Trent, England
- Position: Left-back

Youth career
- Burslem Town

Senior career*
Years	Team	Apps	(Gls)
1903–1907	Burslem Port Vale	96	(0)
1907–1911	Oldham Athletic	105	(5)
Total		201	(5)
- * Club domestic league appearances and goals

James Hamilton (born 1884; date of death unknown) was an English footballer who played at left-back for Burslem Port Vale and Oldham Athletic in the 1900s.

== Career ==
Hamilton joined Burslem Port Vale from Burslem Town in March 1903. He played six Second Division games in the 1903–04 season, and went on to play 23 league and two FA Cup games in the 1904–05 campaign. He missed just four of the club's 38 league games of the 1905–06 season and went on to make 33 league appearances in the 1906–07 campaign. However, he was forced to leave the Athletic Ground after the club went into liquidation in 1907. He moved on to Oldham Athletic.

== Career statistics ==
Appearances and goals by club, season and competition
Club	Season	League			FA Cup		Total	
Club	Season	Division	Apps	Goals	Apps	Goals	Apps	Goals
Burslem Port Vale	1903–04	Second Division	6	0	0	0	6	0
Burslem Port Vale	1904–05	Second Division	23	0	2	0	25	0
Burslem Port Vale	1905–06	Second Division	34	0	2	0	36	0
Burslem Port Vale	1906–07	Second Division	33	0	4	0	37	0
Burslem Port Vale	Total		96	0	8	0	104	0
Oldham Athletic	1907–08	Second Division	37	1	4	0	41	1
Oldham Athletic	1908–09	Second Division	36	4	2	1	38	5
Oldham Athletic	1909–10	Second Division	17	0	1	0	18	0
Oldham Athletic	1910–11	First Division	15	0	3	0	18	0
Oldham Athletic	Total		105	5	10	1	115	6
Career total			201	5	18	1	219	6

== Honours ==
Oldham Athletic

- Football League Second Division second-place promotion: 1909–10
