= Herbert Lounds =

English footballer

Personal information
- Full name: Herbert Ernest Lounds
- Date of birth: 30 May 1889
- Place of birth: Masbrough, England
- Date of death: 1964 (aged 74–75)
- Position: Winger

Senior career*
Years	Team	Apps	(Gls)
1910–1911	Silverwood Colliery		
1911–1912	Gainsborough Trinity	23	(0)
1919–1920	Leeds City	8	(0)
1919–1923	Rotherham County	89	(6)
1924–1925	Halifax Town	5	(0)
Total		125	(6)
- * Club domestic league appearances and goals

Herbert Ernest Lounds (30 May 1889 – 1964) was an English footballer who played in the Football League for Gainsborough Trinity, Halifax Town, Leeds City and Rotherham County.
