= 1939–40 Oldham Athletic A.F.C. season =

Oldham Athletic
1939–40 season
- Manager: Robert Mellor
- Football League Third Division North: 18th
Home colours

The 1939–40 season was Oldham Athletic's was the club's 45th season since forming in 1895. The team competed in Football League Third Division North. Following Britain's declaration of war on 3 September 1939, the league was abandoned after just three games and the results expunged from the records. For this reason, appearances made and goals scored in the Football League matches that were played do not contribute to a player's overall appearances and goals record.

== Fixtures ==
Date	Opponents	Venue	Result F – A
26 August 1939	Carlisle United	H	3–1
28 August 1939	Halifax Town	A	0–2
2 September 1939	Accrington Stanley	A	0–2

== Standings ==
Pos	Team	Pld	W	D	L	GF	GA	GAv	Pts
16	Barrow	3	0	2	1	4	5	0.800	2
16	Southport	3	0	2	1	4	5	0.800	2
18	Oldham Athletic	3	1	0	2	3	5	0.600	2
19	Hartlepools United	3	0	2	1	1	4	0.250	2
20	York City	3	0	1	2	3	5	0.600	1

Source: Football League Division 3 (North) Table 1939/40

== See also ==
- Oldham Athletic A.F.C. seasons
