= Wilkie Ward =

English footballer

Personal information
- Full name: Wilkin Ward
- Date of birth: 1884
- Place of birth: Rochdale, England
- Date of death: 1958 (aged 73–74)
- Position: Winger

Senior career*
Years	Team	Apps	(Gls)
1905–1906	Whitworth		
1907–1908	Oldham Athletic	15	(1)
1908–1909	Bradford (Park Avenue)	18	(2)
1910	Rossendale United		
Total		33	(3)
- * Club domestic league appearances and goals

Wilkin Ward (1884–1958) was an English footballer who played in the Football League for Bradford (Park Avenue) and Oldham Athletic.
