= Matt Brunton =

English footballer

Personal information
- Full name: Matthew Brunton
- Date of birth: 20 April 1878
- Place of birth: Burnley, England
- Date of death: 29 December 1962 (aged 84)
- Place of death: Burnley, England
- Position: Inside forward

Youth career
- c. 1894: Vale XI

Senior career*
Years	Team	Apps	(Gls)
1899–1900	Preston North End	8	(2)
1900–1901	Accrington Stanley		
1901–1902	Burnley	30	(8)
1902–1904	Accrington Stanley		(40)
1904–1905	Leicester Fosse	5	(0)
1905–1906	Nelson		
1906–1907	Accrington Stanley		
1907–1908	Oldham Athletic	1	(0)
1908–1909	Southport Central	30	(8)
c. 1909	Great Harwood		
c. 1909	Haslingden		
c. 1910	Darwen		
c. 1910	Accrington Stanley		
1910–11	Rossendale United	12	(5)
- * Club domestic league appearances and goals

Matthew Brunton (20 April 1878 – 29 December 1962) was an English professional footballer who played as an inside forward in the Football League for Burnley, Preston North End, Leicester Fosse and Oldham Athletic. He had a long playing association with Accrington Stanley and served as trainer-coach during the club's maiden Football League season in 1921–22.

== Personal life ==
Brunton was a soldier in the South Lancashire Regiment and was bought out of the army to become a professional footballer. Prior to the First World War, he worked at the Burnley Corporation Baths. He served as a sergeant in the South Lancashire Regiment during the war and was wounded in the leg in January 1916.

== Career statistics ==
Appearances and goals by club, season and competition
Club	Season	League			FA Cup		Other		Total	
Club	Season	Division	Apps	Goals	Apps	Goals	Apps	Goals	Apps	Goals
Leicester Fosse	1904–05	Second Division	5	0	1	0	―		6	0
Southport Central	1908–09	Lancashire Combination First Division	30	8	1	0	2 (Note: Appearances in Lancashire Senior Cup)	1	33	9
Career total			35	8	2	0	2	1	39	9

== Honours ==
Accrington Stanley

- Lancashire Combination First Division: 1902–03, 1905–06

Oldham Athletic

- Lancashire Combination First Division: 1906–07
