= Paddy Stokes (footballer) =

English footballer (1883–1959)

Personal information
- Full name: Patrick Stokes
- Date of birth: 1883
- Place of birth: Stockton-on-Tees, England
- Date of death: 15 November 1959 (aged 75–76)
- Position: Winger

Senior career*
Years	Team	Apps	(Gls)
1905–1906	Shildon Athletic		
1906–1907	Denaby United		
1907	Grimsby Town	6	(1)
1907–1908	Shildon Athletic		
1908	Grimsby Town	8	(1)
1908–1909	Oldham Athletic	2	(1)
1909–1910	Shildon Athletic		
1910–1911	Oldham Athletic	0	(0)
1911–1912	Shildon Athletic		
- * Club domestic league appearances and goals

Patrick Stokes (1883 – 15 November 1959) was an English professional footballer who played as a winger.
