= Fred Parnell =

English footballer

Personal information
- Full name: Gershom Frederick Parnell
- Date of birth: 26 September 1883
- Place of birth: Sutton-in-Ashfield, England
- Date of death: 1960 (aged 76–77)
- Position: Winger

Senior career*
Years	Team	Apps	(Gls)
1901–1902	Skegby		
1902–1903	Pinxton		
1903–1905	Derby County	9	(0)
1905–1908	Leeds City	104	(15)
1908–1909	Exeter City		
1909–1910	Preston North End	15	(1)
1910–1912	Exeter City		
1912–1913	Sutton Junction		
1913	Mansfield Town		
Total		128	(16)
- * Club domestic league appearances and goals

Gershom Frederick Parnell (26 September 1883 – 1960) was an English footballer who played in the Football League for Derby County, Leeds City and Preston North End.
