= Elijah Round =

English footballer (1882–??)

Elijah Round (born January 1882) was an English footballer. His regular position was as a goalkeeper. He was born in Stoke-on-Trent. He played for Manchester United, Oldham Athletic, and Barnsley.
