= Harry Sherwin =

English footballer

Personal information
- Full name: Harry Sherwin
- Date of birth: 11 October 1893
- Place of birth: Walsall, England
- Date of death: 8 January 1953 (aged 59)
- Place of death: Leeds, England
- Height: 5 ft 8 in (1.73 m)
- Position: Wing half

Senior career*
Years	Team	Apps	(Gls)
1913	Darlaston		
1913–1921	Sunderland	28	(0)
1921–1925	Leeds United	99	(2)
1925–1926	Barnsley	14	(0)
- * Club domestic league appearances and goals

Harry Sherwin (11 October 1893 – 8 January 1953) was an English professional footballer who played as a wing half for Sunderland. He was also more well known for being a Leeds United club legend, scoring 2 of the clubs most important goals in their history as they defeated Barrow 2-0 in the FA Cup 5th round in 1923. Probably
