= Rodger Wylde =

English footballer

Personal information
- Date of birth: 8 March 1954 (age 72)
- Place of birth: Sheffield, England
- Position: Striker

Senior career*
Years	Team	Apps	(Gls)
1972–1980	Sheffield Wednesday	168	(54)
1980–1983	Oldham Athletic	113	(51)
1983–1984	Sporting CP	9	(1)
1984–1985	Sunderland	11	(3)
1985–1988	Barnsley	52	(19)
1987–1988?	→ Rotherham United (loan)	6	(1)
1988–1989	Stockport County	26	(12)
- * Club domestic league appearances and goals

Rodger Wylde (born 8 March 1954) is an English former professional footballer who played for Sheffield Wednesday, Oldham Athletic, Sporting CP, Sunderland, Barnsley and Stockport County. Wylde played as a striker, he was good in the air but had fine skill on the ground for a tall man. In his final few years in football, he took a degree in physiotherapy

== Playing career ==
Rodger Wylde's career lasted from 1972 to 1989, during which time he played 370 English league games, scoring 139 goals.

=== Sheffield Wednesday ===
Roger Wylde joined Sheffield Wednesday as an apprentice straight from school in July 1971 and made his debut for the club on 18 November 1972 against Middlesbrough, he scored his first goal two weeks later on 2 December against Millwall. Wylde's opportunities at Hillsborough were limited until the appointment of Len Ashurst as manager in October 1975. In the 1976–77 season he was top scorer for the club with 25 goals in all competitions and formed a fine attacking partnership with Tommy Tynan, between them they netted 40 goals that season.

Wylde continued to score goals regularly over the following two seasons and became a crowd favourite with Wednesday supporters who gave him the nickname "Oscar". Wylde's trademark celebration after scoring a goal was to go on his knees with arms aloft in front of the fans. The 1979–80 season saw Wylde not playing as regularly for the team as Terry Curran, Ian Mellor and Andy McCulloch became the main forwards during Wednesday's promotion that season from Division Three. He was sold by manager Jack Charlton midway through that season, with Wylde playing his final game on 16 February 1980 and moving to Oldham Athletic as a replacement for Vic Halom.

=== Oldham Athletic, Sporting CP, Sunderland ===
Wylde continued his good goalscoring form at Oldham finishing top scorer in each of his three full seasons there, in total scoring 51 league goals in 113 appearances. At the end of his contract with Oldham, Wylde moved abroad to play for top Portuguese side Sporting CP for the 1983–84 season. He was very much a fringe player with Sporting and his chances in the first team were limited. Wylde was brought back to the English game during the 1984–85 season by his old manager at Wednesday, Len Ashurst, who was now in charge at Sunderland and this gave Wylde his only opportunity to play top-level football in England. He played 11 games that season for Sunderland scoring three goals including one against Liverpool at Anfield in 1–1 draw.

=== Barnsley, Stockport County ===
Rodger Wylde's last few seasons as a player were at Barnsley and Stockport County. He spent three seasons at Barnsley playing 52 league games scoring 19 goals. Part of the 1987–88 season saw him on loan at Rotherham United before joining Stockport where he spent one season (1988–89) on the playing staff, appearing in 26 games and scoring 12 goals.

== Physiotherapist ==
In order to stay in football when he retired from playing Wylde started a physiotherapy degree course towards the end of his playing career. He graduated from the University of Salford. After qualifying he opened a treatment centre and gymnasium in Sheffield but when Danny Bergara became Stockport manager in March 1989 he offered Wylde the post of club physiotherapist. Wylde was physio at Stockport for 25 years, an unusually long time, serving under eleven different managers. In 2006, he was inducted into Stockport's Hall of Fame. After Stockport's promotion in 2008, Rodger got naked in the changing rooms at Wembley and said, "It's been a really.......good day" .

Wylde left Stockport to become the 'Head of Sports Science and Medicine' at Chesterfield on 8 July 2014, replacing Jamie Hewitt.

In February 2022, Wylde became Physio at EFL Championship club Peterborough United.

In the summer of 2022, Wylde became lead Physiotherapist at EFL League Two club Scunthorpe United.

== Music ==
Rodger Wylde was always a big music fan especially of progressive rock. In 1998, he formed his own band, Fracture, along with Stockport player Tom Bennett, who was recovering from a severe break to his leg at the time. Both men decided to learn the guitar to brighten up the prolonged injury period, and a bassist and a drummer were added. After a period of nonperforming, Fracture were re-formed in April 2006 with Stockport's club doctor Steve Greenhough (keyboards and bass), David Prudhoe (lead guitar) and Keith Chadwick (drums) joining Rodger and Tom to complete the new line-up. They play regular concerts around the Greater Manchester area.
