= Harry Singleton =

English footballer (1877–1948)

Personal information
- Full name: Harry Bertram Singleton
- Date of birth: 8 September 1877
- Place of birth: Widnes, Lancashire, England
- Date of death: 5 July 1948 (aged 70)
- Place of death: Macclesfield, England
- Position: Outside forward

Senior career*
Years	Team	Apps	(Gls)
1896–189?	Liverpool South End		
189?–189?	Port Sunlight		
189?–189?	Southport Central		
189?–189?	Fleetwood Rangers		
189?–1900	Macclesfield		
1900	Stockport County	1	(0)
1900–1901	Bury	0	(0)
1901–1902	Everton	3	(0)
1902–1903	Grimsby Town	18	(2)
1903–1904	New Brompton		
1904–1905	Queens Park Rangers	19	
1905–1907	Leeds City	45	(7)
1907–19??	Huddersfield Town		
- * Club domestic league appearances and goals

Harry Bertram Singleton (8 September 1877 – 5 July 1948) was an English professional footballer who played as an outside forward.
