= Billy McLeod =

English footballer

Personal information
- Full name: William McLeod
- Date of birth: 4 June 1887
- Place of birth: Hebburn, England
- Date of death: 1959 (aged 71–72)
- Height: 5 ft 8 in (1.73 m)
- Position: Centre forward

Senior career*
Years	Team	Apps	(Gls)
1904–1905	Hebburn Argyle		
1905–1906	Peebles Rovers		
1906–1907	Lincoln City	13	(8)
1907–1919	Leeds City	289	(172)
1919–1921	Notts County	40	(10)
1921	Doncaster Rovers		
Total		342	(190)
- * Club domestic league appearances and goals

William McLeod (4 June 1887 – 1959) was an English footballer who played in the Football League for Leeds City, Lincoln City and Notts County.
