= Fred Linfoot =

English footballer

Personal information
- Date of birth: 12 March 1901
- Place of birth: Whitley Bay, Northumberland, England
- Date of death: 10 April 1979 (aged 78)
- Place of death: Tyne and Wear, England
- Height: 5 ft 11 in (1.80 m)
- Position: Outside right

Senior career*
Years	Team	Apps	(Gls)
–	Smith's Dock		
1919	Leeds City	0	(0)
1919–1920	Lincoln City	29	(3)
1920–1923	Chelsea	34	(1)
1923–1926	Fulham	41	(4)
1926–19??	Blyth Spartans		
–	Shiremoor Albion		
–	Columbia (London)		
–	Dorman Long (Westminster)		
–	Ashington		
- * Club domestic league appearances and goals

Fred Linfoot (12 March 1901 – 1979) was an English footballer who made 104 appearances in the Football League playing for Lincoln City, Chelsea and Fulham. He played as an outside right. He also played non-league football in London and in his native north-east of England.

Linfoot was on the books of Leeds City when the club was expelled from the league and disbanded in 1919, but appeared for them only in wartime football. When the players were auctioned off, he joined Lincoln City for £250.
