= Bill Bradbury (footballer, born 1889) =

English footballer (1889–1963)

Personal information
- Full name: William Bradbury
- Date of birth: 11 March 1889
- Place of birth: Burton-on-Trent, England
- Date of death: 1963 (aged 73–74)
- Height: 5 ft 8 in (1.73 m)
- Position: Wing half

Senior career*
Years	Team	Apps	(Gls)
1907	Allsopp's Brewery		
1908	Tutbury Town		
1909	Aberdare Town		
1912–1913	Oldham Athletic	7	(2)
1913	Scunthorpe & Lindsey United		
1919–1921	Oldham Athletic	67	(3)
1922–1923	Rochdale	12	(0)
1923	Burton Town		
1924	Burton All Saints		
1925	Bass & Co		
Total		86	(5)
- * Club domestic league appearances and goals

William Bradbury (11 March 1889 – 1963) was an English footballer who played as a wing half in the Football League for Oldham Athletic and Rochdale.
