= Davie Walker =

English footballer

Personal information
- Full name: David Walker
- Date of birth: 1884
- Place of birth: Walsall, England
- Date of death: 1935 (aged 50–51)
- Position: Inside forward

Senior career*
Years	Team	Apps	(Gls)
1902–1903	Walsall White Star		
1903–1904	Birchfield Villa		
1904–1905	Wolverhampton Wanderers	2	(0)
1905–1907	Bristol Rovers		
1907–1908	West Bromwich Albion	36	(15)
1908–1911	Leicester Fosse	73	(27)
1911–1912	Bristol Rovers		
1912	Willenhall Swifts		
1913	Walsall		
Total		111	(42)
- * Club domestic league appearances and goals

David Walker (1884–1935) was an English footballer who played in the Football League for Leicester Fosse, West Bromwich Albion and Wolverhampton Wanderers.
