= Shirley Hubbard =

English footballer and manager

Personal information
- Full name: Shirley Hubbard
- Date of birth: 18 February 1885
- Place of birth: Leicester, England
- Date of death: 22 February 1962 (aged 77)
- Place of death: Houghton on the Hill, England
- Positions: Inside right; centre forward

Senior career*
Years	Team	Apps	(Gls)
1902–1903	St. Andrew's		
1903–1905	Leicestershire Regiment		
1905–1906	Leicester Imperial		
1906–1913	Leicester Fosse	137	(36)
1913–1914	Darlington		
- South Shields
1915	→ Bloxwich Strollers (guest)	1	(0)
1916	→ Port Vale (guest)	1	(0)
1916	→ Leicester Fosse (guest)	4	(0)
1917	→ Birmingham (guest)	1	(0)
1918	→ Leicester Fosse (guest)	13	(5)
1919–1920	Leicester City	3	(1)
1920–192?	Ashby Town		

Managerial career
- 1920–192?: Ashby Town (player-manager)
- * Club domestic league appearances and goals

Shirley Hubbard (18 February 1885 – 22 February 1962) was an English professional footballer who made 140 appearances in the Football League for Leicester City as a forward. He later served as player-manager of Ashby Town.

== Career ==
After beginning his career with local Leicester clubs, Second Division club Leicester Fosse bought Hubbard out of the army to sign him on 22 April 1907. Over the next six years he made 151 appearances. He scored 39 goals for the club and helped the Foxes to promotion to the First Division at the end of the 1907–08 season. Hubbard departed Filbert Street for North Eastern League club Darlington in May 1913 and was playing for South Shields upon the outbreak of the First World War in 1914. During the war, he guested for Port Vale, Bloxwich Strollers, Birmingham and on two occasions for Leicester Fosse. Hubbard briefly resumed his professional career with the reformed Leicester City during the 1919–20 season and finished his Foxes career with 154 appearances and 40 goals. He took over as player-manager at Leicestershire Senior League club Ashby Town. Hubbard later returned to Leicester City as a coach prior to the Second World War.

== Personal life ==
As of 1901, Hubbard worked as a shoe finisher and enlisted in the Leicestershire Regiment on 14 July 1903. He was posted to India and served until April 1907. As of 1911, Hubbard was married with one child. In November 1914, three months after the outbreak of the First World War, Hubbard re-enlisted in the Leicestershire Regiment and was sent to the Western Front in February 1915. He saw action at Hooge, the Hohenzollern Redoubt, the Somme and during the Hundred Days Offensive. After he retired from football, Hubbard remained on the sports scene and wrote a column in the local Leicestershire press.

== Career statistics ==
Appearances and goals by club, season and competition
Club	Season	League			FA Cup		Total	
Club	Season	Division	Apps	Goals	Apps	Goals	Apps	Goals
Leicester Fosse	1906–07	Second Division	6	2	—		6	2
Leicester Fosse	1907–08	Second Division	25	7	2	0	27	7
Leicester Fosse	1908–09	First Division	21	8	2	0	23	8
Leicester Fosse	1909–10	Second Division	26	9	4	2	30	11
Leicester Fosse	1910–11	Second Division	26	4	3	0	29	4
Leicester Fosse	1911–12	Second Division	26	3	3	1	29	4
Leicester Fosse	1912–13	Second Division	7	3	0	0	7	3
Leicester Fosse	Total		137	36	14	3	151	39
Leicester City	1919–20	Second Division	3	1	0	0	3	1
Leicester City	Leicester City/Fosse total		140	37	14	3	154	40

== Honours ==
Leicester Fosse

- Football League Second Division second-place promotion: 1907–08
