= Tommy Mayson =

English footballer

Personal information
- Full name: Thomas Mayson
- Date of birth: 8 December 1886
- Place of birth: Whitehaven, England
- Date of death: 1972 (aged 85–86)
- Height: 5 ft 8 in (1.73 m)
- Position: Inside forward

Senior career*
| Years | Team | Apps | (Gls) |
| 1907–1911 | Burnley | 67 | (14) |
| 1911–1915 | Grimsby Town | 85 | (28) |
| 1919–1920 | Everton | 1 | (1) |
| 1920–1921 | Pontypridd | ? | (?) |
| 1921–1922 | Wolverhampton Wanderers | 2 | (0) |
| 1922–1923 | Aberdare Athletic | 19 | (4) |
- * Club domestic league appearances and goals

Thomas Mayson (8 December 1886 – 1972) was an English professional footballer who played as an inside forward.
