= 1989–90 Oldham Athletic A.F.C. season =

Oldham Athletic
1989–90 season
- Chairman: Ian Stott
- Manager: Joe Royle
- Stadium: Boundary Park
- Second Division: 8th
- FA Cup: Semi Final
- League Cup: Final
- Full Members' Cup: Second Round
- Top goalscorer: Andy Ritchie (28)
Home colours	Away colours	Third colours

During the 1989–90 English football season, Oldham Athletic A.F.C. competed in the Football League Second Division.

== Season summary ==
Oldham finished in 8th place in the league, missing out on the playoffs by three points. However the club enjoyed excellent form in the cups, reaching the FA Cup Semi-Finals for only the 2nd time in their history, and the Final of the League Cup – and the club's first ever appearance at Wembley.

== Competitions ==
=== Legend ===
Win	Draw	Loss

=== League Division 2 ===
19 August 1989 1	Blackburn Rovers	1–0	Oldham Athletic	Blackburn
	Garner 4'	Report		Stadium: Ewood Park; Attendance: 9,939; Referee: JB Worrall

22 August 1989 2	Oldham Athletic	1–1	Watford	Oldham
	R. Holden 35'	Report	Holdsworth 51'	Stadium: Boundary Park; Attendance: 6,242; Referee: A Seville

26 August 1989 3	Oldham Athletic	2–2	Swindon Town	Oldham
	Palmer 66', 82'	Report	McLoughlin 3'; Shearer 49'	Stadium: Boundary Park; Attendance: 5,231; Referee: RF Nixon

2 September 1989 4	Newcastle United	2–1	Oldham Athletic	Newcastle upon Tyne
	Quinn 43', 70' (pen.)	Report	R. Holden 61'	Stadium: St James' Park; Attendance: 21,092; Referee: KS Hackett

9 September 1989 5	Oldham Athletic	3–2	Plymouth Argyle	Oldham
	Palmer 28'; R. Holden 54'; Ritchie 68'	Report	McCarthy 50'; Thomas 71'	Stadium: Boundary Park; Attendance: 4,940; Referee: AB Wilkie

16 September 1989 6	Stoke City	1–2	Oldham Athletic	Stoke-on-Trent
	Bamber 65'	Report	Palmer 16'; Ritchie 37'	Stadium: Victoria Ground; Attendance: 10,725; Referee: AW Ward

23 September 1989 7	Oldham Athletic	2–1	West Bromwich Albion	Oldham
	Ritchie 58' (pen.), 76'; Warhurst (red card) 82'	Report	West 67'	Stadium: Boundary Park; Attendance: 6,907; Referee: KA Redfern

26 September 1989 8	Sheffield United	2–1	Oldham Athletic	Sheffield
	Deane 77'; Agana 80'	Report	Bunn 88'	Stadium: Bramall Lane; Attendance: 14,298; Referee: TJ Holbrook

30 September 1989 9	Oldham Athletic	1–0	Leicester City	Oldham
	Ritchie 54'	Report		Stadium: Boundary Park; Attendance: 6,407; Referee: G Courtney

7 October 1989 10	Oldham Athletic	2–0	Barnsley	Oldham
	Bunn 4'; Milligan 7'	Report		Stadium: Boundary Park; Attendance: 6,769; Referee: VG Callow

14 October 1989 11	Bournemouth	2–0	Oldham Athletic	Bournemouth
	Moulden 2'; Peacock 65'	Report		Stadium: Dean Court; Attendance: 6,796; Referee: JC Deakin

17 October 1989 12	Hull City	0–0	Oldham Athletic	Hull
		Report		Stadium: Boothferry Park; Attendance: 5,109; Referee: PW Vanes

21 October 1989 13	Oldham Athletic	2–0	Middlesbrough	Oldham
	Ritchie 23', 85'	Report		Stadium: Boundary Park; Attendance: 6,835; Referee: J Rushton

28 October 1989 14	Wolverhampton Wanderers	1–1	Oldham Athletic	Wolverhampton
	Thompson 52' (pen.)	Report	Milligan 70'	Stadium: Molineux Stadium; Attendance: 15,278; Referee: RS Lewis

31 October 1989 15	Oldham Athletic	2–2	Bradford City	Oldham
	Barlow 56'; Ritchie 72' (pen.)	Report	Quinn 9', 58'	Stadium: Boundary Park; Attendance: 7,762; Referee: MD Reed

4 November 1989 16	Oldham Athletic	2–1	Sunderland	Oldham
	Ritchie 9'; Warhurst 52'	Report	Owers 88'	Stadium: Boundary Park; Attendance: 8,830; Referee: JW Lloyd

11 November 1989 17	Oxford United	0–1	Oldham Athletic	Oxford
		Report	Ritchie 25'	Stadium: Manor Ground; Attendance: 4,491; Referee: DR Elleray

18 November 1989 18	Oldham Athletic	1–1	Brighton & Hove Albion	Oldham
	Milligan 39'	Report	Codner 60'	Stadium: Boundary Park; Attendance: 6,769; Referee: JL Watson

25 November 1989 19	Ipswich Town	1–1	Oldham Athletic	Ipswich
	Kiwomya 73'	Report	Yallop 68' (o.g.)	Stadium: Portman Road; Attendance: 12,407; Referee: PS Danson

1 December 1989 20	Oldham Athletic	2–0	Blackburn Rovers	Oldham
	R. Holden 60'; Ritchie 69'	Report		Stadium: Boundary Park; Attendance: 10,635; Referee: N Midgley

9 December 1989 21	Watford	3–0	Oldham Athletic	Watford
	Wilkinson 4'; Hodges 30'; Penrice 45'	Report		Stadium: Vicarage Road; Attendance: 9,399; Referee: RG Milford

16 December 1989 22	West Ham United	0–2	Oldham Athletic	London
		Report	Milligan 4'; Foster 17' (o.g.)	Stadium: Upton Park; Attendance: 14,960; Referee: RL Hamer

26 December 1989 23	Oldham Athletic	2–1	Port Vale	Oldham
	Adams 29'; Barrett 59'	Report	Parkin 61'	Stadium: Boundary Park; Attendance: 11,274; Referee: T Mills

30 December 1989 24	Oldham Athletic	3–3	Portsmouth	Oldham
	Milligan 26', 86'; Palmer 33'	Report	Whittingham 4', 30', 34'	Stadium: Boundary Park; Attendance: 8,815; Referee: GM Tyson

1 January 1990 25	Leeds United	1–1	Oldham Athletic	Leeds
	Hendrie 85'	Report	Palmer 36'	Stadium: Elland Road; Attendance: 30,160; Referee: P Don

13 January 1990 26	Swindon Town	3–2	Oldham Athletic	Swindon
	McLoughlin 35'; White 47', 83'	Report	McGarvey 63'; Adams 89'	Stadium: County Ground; Attendance: 7,785; Referee: K Morton

20 January 1990 27	Oldham Athletic	1–1	Newcastle United	Oldham
	Ritchie 66'	Report	McGhee 74'	Stadium: Boundary Park; Attendance: 11,285; Referee: B Hill

3 February 1990 28	West Bromwich Albion	2–2	Oldham Athletic	West Bromwich
	Robson 2'; West 68'	Report	Ritchie 24' (pen.); Palmer 70'	Stadium: The Hawthorns; Attendance: 12,237; Referee: RL Bigger

10 February 1990 29	Oldham Athletic	2–0	Stoke City	Oldham
	Ritchie 54'; Palmer 64'	Report		Stadium: Boundary Park; Attendance: 10,137; Referee: MG Peck

24 February 1990 30	Oldham Athletic	4–1	Ipswich Town	Oldham
	Marshall 38', 40'; Palmer 49'; Irwin 73'	Report	Wark 52'	Stadium: Boundary Park; Attendance: 10,193; Referee: G Courtney

3 March 1990 31	Brighton & Hove Albion	1–1	Oldham Athletic	Hove
	Gotsmanov 54'	Report	Adams 72'	Stadium: Goldstone Ground; Attendance: 8,229; Referee: DS Vickers

17 March 1990 32	Barnsley	1–0	Oldham Athletic	Barnsley
	Milligan 24' (o.g.)	Report		Stadium: Oakwell; Attendance: 10,598; Referee: IG Cruikshanks

20 March 1990 33	Oldham Athletic	4–0	Bournemouth	Oldham
	Redfearn 14'; Milligan 46'; Palmer 56', 85'	Report		Stadium: Boundary Park; Attendance: 10,109; Referee: RA Hart

24 March 1990 34	Oldham Athletic	3–2	Hull City	Oldham
	Palmer 28', 33'; Marshall 47'	Report	Hunter 52'; Jobson 75'	Stadium: Boundary Park; Attendance: 11,472; Referee: DA Hedges

28 March 1990 35	Oldham Athletic	0–2	Sheffield United	Oldham
	Marshall (penalty missed)	Report	Deane 29', 79'	Stadium: Boundary Park; Attendance: 14,580; Referee: RF Nixon

31 March 1990 36	Middlesbrough	1–0	Oldham Athletic	Middlesbrough
	Slaven 26'	Report		Stadium: Ayresome Park; Attendance: 17,238; Referee: J Ashworth

3 April 1990 37	Leicester City	3–0	Oldham Athletic	Leicester
	North 12'; Kelly 52', 68'	Report		Stadium: Filbert Street; Attendance: 10,368; Referee: J Rushton

13 April 1990 38	Oldham Athletic	3–1	Leeds United	Oldham
	R. Holden 23' (pen.), 64'; Bunn 72'	Report	Davison 76'	Stadium: Boundary Park; Attendance: 16,293; Referee: B Hill

16 April 1990 39	Port Vale	2–0	Oldham Athletic	Stoke-on-Trent
	Beckford 40', 49'	Report		Stadium: Vale Park; Attendance: 11,451; Referee: RG Milford

18 April 1990 40	Plymouth Argyle	2–0	Oldham Athletic	Plymouth
	McCarthy 18', 45'	Report		Stadium: Home Park; Attendance: 8,146; Referee: RM Wiseman

21 April 1990 41	Oldham Athletic	3–0	West Ham United	Oldham
	Ritchie 52' (pen.); Bunn 55', 85'	Report		Stadium: Boundary Park; Attendance: 12,170; Referee: KP Barratt

24 April 1990 42	Portsmouth	2–1	Oldham Athletic	Portsmouth
	Wigley 37'; Chamberlain 41'	Report	Barrett 33'	Stadium: Fratton Park; Attendance: 9,601; Referee: A Gunn

1 May 1990 43	Oldham Athletic	4–1	Oxford United	Oldham
	R. Holden 37', 50', 90'; Palmer 83'	Report	Ford 87'	Stadium: Boundary Park; Attendance: 12,616; Referee: A Gunn

3 May 1990 44	Oldham Athletic	1–1	Wolverhampton Wanderers	Oldham
	Palmer 39'	Report	Steele 87'	Stadium: Boundary Park; Attendance: 17,451; Referee: JW Lloyd

5 May 1990 45	Sunderland	2–3	Oldham Athletic	Sunderland
	Owers 37'; Armstrong 86'	Report	Adams 25'; Ritchie 65'; Palmer 77'	Stadium: Roker Park; Attendance: 22,221; Referee: DT Phillips

7 May 1990 46	Bradford City	1–1	Oldham Athletic	Bradford
	Adcock 71'	Report	Redfearn 63'	Stadium: Valley Parade; Attendance: 6,798; Referee: KA Lupton

=== F.A. Cup ===
6 January 1990 3	Birmingham City	1–1	Oldham Athletic	Birmingham
	Gleghorn 53'	Report	Bunn 65'	Stadium: St Andrew's; Attendance: 13,131; Referee: KA Cooper

10 January 1990 3	Oldham Athletic	1–0	Birmingham City	Oldham
	Holden 75'	Report		Stadium: Boundary Park; Attendance: 9,982; Referee: KA Cooper

27 January 1990 4	Oldham Athletic	2–1	Brighton & Hove Albion	Oldham
	McGarvey 66'; Ritchie 68'	Report	Barham 51'	Stadium: Boundary Park; Attendance: 11,034; Referee: MJD Bodenham

17 February 1990 5	Oldham Athletic	2–2	Everton	Oldham
	Ritchie 60' (pen.); Palmer 66'	Report	Sharp 22'; Cottee 25'	Stadium: Boundary Park; Attendance: 19,320; Referee: AW Ward

21 February 1990 5	Everton	1–1 (a.e.t.)	Oldham Athletic	Liverpool
	Whiteside (red card) 48'; Sheedy 114' (pen.)	Report	Marshall 102'	Stadium: Goodison Park; Attendance: 36,663; Referee: AW Ward

10 March 1990 5	Oldham Athletic	2–1 (a.e.t.)	Everton	Oldham
	Palmer 33'; Marshall 92' (pen.)	Report	Cottee 12'	Stadium: Boundary Park; Attendance: 19,346; Referee: RG Milford

14 March 1990 6	Oldham Athletic	3–0	Aston Villa	Oldham
	Holden 38'; Price 50' (o.g.); Redfearn 69'	Report		Stadium: Boundary Park; Attendance: 19,490; Referee: KS Hackett

8 April 1990 SF	Manchester United	3–3 (a.e.t.)	Oldham Athletic	Manchester
	Robson 28'; Webb 72'; Wallace 92'	Report	Barrett 5'; Marshall 76'; Palmer 107'	Stadium: Maine Road; Attendance: 44,026; Referee: JB Worrall

11 April 1990 SF	Manchester United	2–1 (a.e.t.)	Oldham Athletic	Manchester
	McClair 50'; Robins 115'	Report	Ritchie 81'	Stadium: Maine Road; Attendance: 35,005; Referee: JB Worrall

=== Football League Cup ===
19 September 1989 2	Oldham Athletic	2–1	Leeds United	Oldham
	Ritchie 33'; Holden 40'	Report	Strachan 27'	Stadium: Boundary Park; Attendance: 8,415; Referee: RA Hart

3 October 1989 2	Leeds United	1–2 (2–4 agg.)	Oldham Athletic	Leeds
	Fairclough 57'	Report	Bunn 37'; Ritchie 40'	Stadium: Elland Road; Attendance: 18,092; Referee: HW King

25 October 1989 3	Oldham Athletic	7–0	Scarborough	Oldham
	Bunn 10', 18', 20', 35', 42', 89'; Ritchie 53'	Report		Stadium: Boundary Park; Attendance: 7,712; Referee: JE Martin

22 November 1989 4	Oldham Athletic	3–1	Arsenal	Oldham
	Ritchie 45', 74'; Henry 64'	Report	Quinn 89'	Stadium: Boundary Park; Attendance: 14,924; Referee: RB Gifford

24 January 1990 5	Southampton	2–2	Oldham Athletic	Southampton
	Le Tissier 6', 84' (pen.)	Report	Ritchie 80', 90'	Stadium: The Dell; Attendance: 21,026; Referee: RG Groves

31 January 1990 5	Oldham Athletic	2–0	Southampton	Oldham
	Ritchie 9'; Milligan 50'	Report		Stadium: Boundary Park; Attendance: 18,862; Referee: G Courtney

14 February 1990 SF	Oldham Athletic	6–0	West Ham United	Oldham
	Adams 11'; Ritchie 19', 78'; Barrett 33'; Holden 46'; Palmer 69'	Report		Stadium: Boundary Park; Attendance: 19,263; Referee: LC Shapter

7 March 1990 SF	West Ham United	3–0 (3–6 agg.)	Oldham Athletic	London
	Martin 13'; Dicks 46' (pen.); Kelly 65'	Report		Stadium: Upton Park; Attendance: 15,431; Referee: TJ Holbrook

29 April 1990 F	Nottingham Forest	1–0	Oldham Athletic	London
	Jemson 48'	Report		Stadium: Wembley Stadium; Attendance: 74,343; Referee: JE Martin

=== Full Members' Cup ===
28 November 1989	Newcastle United	2–0	Oldham Athletic	Newcastle upon Tyne
	Quinn 4', 88'	Report		Stadium: St James' Park; Attendance: 6,167; Referee: JA Kirkby

== Players ==
=== First-team squad ===
Note: Flags indicate national team as defined under FIFA eligibility rules; some limited exceptions apply. Players may hold more than one non-FIFA nationality.

Pos.	Nation	Player
GK	ENG	Jon Hallworth
GK	ENG	Andy Rhodes
DF	ENG	Andy Barlow
DF	ENG	Earl Barrett
DF	SCO	Willie Donachie
DF	WAL	Andy Holden
DF	IRL	Denis Irwin
DF	ENG	Paul Warhurst
DF	ENG	Gary Williams
MF	ENG	Neil Adams

Pos.	Nation	Player
MF	ENG	Nick Henry
MF	ENG	Rick Holden
MF	IRL	Mike Milligan (captain)
MF	ENG	Neil Redfearn
FW	ENG	Frankie Bunn
FW	ENG	Ian Marshall
FW	ENG	Paul Moulden
FW	SCO	Scott McGarvey
FW	ENG	Roger Palmer
FW	ENG	Andy Ritchie

== Squad statistics ==
=== Appearances and goals ===
No.	Pos	Nat	Player	Total		Division 2		FA Cup		League Cup		FM Cup	
No.	Pos	Nat	Player	Apps	Goals	Apps	Goals	Apps	Goals	Apps	Goals	Apps	Goals
	MF	(England) ENG	Neil Adams	40	5	18+9	4	5+1	0	6+0	1	1+0	0
	DF	(England) ENG	Andy Barlow	62	1	43+1	1	9+0	0	9+0	0	0+0	0
	DF	(England) ENG	Earl Barrett	65	4	46+0	2	9+0	1	9+0	1	1+0	0
	DF	(England) ENG	Chris Blundell	1	0	0+0	0	0+0	0	0+0	0	1+0	0
	FW	(England) ENG	Frankie Bunn	35	13	28+1	5	1+0	1	5+0	7	0+0	0
	DF	(Scotland) SCO	Willie Donachie	9	0	7+0	0	0+0	0	0+1	0	1+0	0
	GK	(England) ENG	Jon Hallworth	29	0	15+0	0	9+0	0	5+0	0	0+0	0
	MF	(England) ENG	Nick Henry	59	1	40+1	0	9+0	0	9+0	1	0+0	0
	DF	(England) ENG	Wayne Heseltine	2	0	1+0	0	0+1	0	0+0	0	0+0	0
	DF	(Wales) WAL	Andy Holden	8	0	6+0	0	2+0	0	0+0	0	0+0	0
	MF	(England) ENG	Rick Holden	64	13	45+0	9	9+0	2	9+0	2	1+0	0
	DF	(Republic of Ireland) IRL	Denis Irwin	60	1	42+0	1	9+0	0	8+0	0	1+0	0
	MF	(Northern Ireland) NIR	Norman Kelly	1	0	0+0	0	0+0	0	0+0	0	0+1	0
	FW	(England) ENG	Ian Marshall	40	6	22+3	3	9+0	3	6+0	0	0+0	0
	FW	(Scotland) SCO	Scott McGarvey	9	2	2+2	1	2+0	1	1+1	0	1+0	0
	MF	(Republic of Ireland) IRL	Mike Milligan	60	8	41+0	7	9+0	0	9+0	1	1+0	0
	FW	(England) ENG	Paul Moulden	8	0	5+3	0	0+0	0	0+0	0	0+0	0
	FW	(England) ENG	Roger Palmer	58	20	33+9	16	6+3	3	5+1	1	0+1	0
	MF	(England) ENG	Neil Redfearn	23	3	15+2	2	5+1	1	0+0	0	0+0	0
	GK	(England) ENG	Andy Rhodes	36	0	31+0	0	0+0	0	4+0	0	1+0	0
	FW	(England) ENG	Andy Ritchie	51	29	37+1	16	4+0	3	8+0	10	1+0	0
	MF	(England) ENG	Paul Warhurst	42	1	28+2	1	2+4	0	6+0	0	0+0	0
	DF	(England) ENG	Gary Williams	4	0	1+2	0	0+0	0	0+0	0	1+0	0
