= Bill Goodwin (Welsh footballer) =

Welsh footballer

William Goodwin (c. 1892–1972) was a Welsh professional footballer who played as a full-back for Oldham Athletic and Crewe Alexandra. He also represented Wales as an amateur in 1913, and played in two wartime internationals in 1919.

== Club career ==
Goodwin was born in Mold, north Wales and played for Holywell United and Wrexham before signing for Oldham Athletic in July 1913. He made his Football League debut at Bolton Wanderers in January 1915, but made only four 4 appearances before peacetime football was suspended due to World War I.

During the First World War, he served with the Royal Welsh Fusiliers, ending the war with the rank of Sergeant.

After the war, he became a first-team regular with Oldham from 1919. He joined Division 3 (North) Crewe Alexandra in May 1921 and made 157 appearances over four seasons, scoring twice. He rejoined Oldham (then in the Second Division) in June 1925 but only made three appearances, before joining Congleton Town later in the year. In 1928 he played for Mossley.

== International career ==
While at Holywell, Goodwin was selected to play for the Wales amateur team against England's amateur team at Llandudno on 8 February 1913.

He played for Wales against England in two Victory International matches in 1919, at Cardiff's Ninian Park on 11 October, and at Stoke's Victoria Ground on 18 October.

== Personal life ==
In 1917, he married Cissy Williams. They had four children: Gwyn, Olwen, Alun and Dilys.

Upon retiring from football, Goodwin worked as a schoolteacher in Oldham. He died in 1972.
