= Joe Shadbolt =

English footballer (1874–1967)

Personal information
- Full name: Joseph Arthur Shadbolt
- Date of birth: 1 August 1874
- Place of birth: Warrington, England
- Date of death: 1967 (aged 92–93)
- Position: Winger

Senior career*
| Years | Team | Apps | (Gls) |
| 1896–1897 | Birkdale South End | | |
| 1897–1907 | Southport Central | | |
| 1907–1909 | Oldham Athletic | 27 | (9) |
| 1909 | Hyde | | |
| Total | | 68 | (12) |
- * Club domestic league appearances and goals

Joseph Arthur Shadbolt (1 August 1874 – 1967) was an English footballer who played in the Football League for Oldham Athletic.
