= Jimmy Mallon =

Scottish footballer

Personal information
- Full name: James Gillan Mallon
- Date of birth: 28 August 1938
- Place of birth: Glasgow, Scotland
- Date of death: 9 May 2012 (aged 73)
- Place of death: Glasgow, Scotland
- Positions: Forward; full back

Senior career*
| Years | Team | Apps | (Gls) |
- Shawfield
| 1956–1958 | Partick Thistle | 9 | (5) |
| 1958–1960 | Oldham Athletic | 31 | (8) |
| 1960–1961 | Stranraer | 7 | (0) |
| 1961–1965 | Greenock Morton | 60 | (8) |
| 1965–1969 | Barrow | 150 | (3) |
- Altrincham
| Total | | 257 | (24) |
- * Club domestic league appearances and goals

James Gillan Mallon (28 August 1938 – 9 May 2012) was a Scottish footballer who played as a forward in the Football League.
