= Frank Hesham =

English footballer

Personal information
- Full name: Francis James Hesham
- Date of birth: 1879
- Place of birth: Gorton, England
- Date of death: 17 November 1915 (aged 36)
- Place of death: West Flanders, Belgium
- Position: Outside right

Senior career*
Years	Team	Apps	(Gls)
1896–1897	Manchester City	2	(0)
1897–1900	Gorton St Francis		
1900–1901	Manchester City	1	(0)
1901–1902	Crewe Alexandra		
1903–1904	Accrington Stanley		
1904–1905	Stoke	17	(1)
1905–1907	Leyton	33	(5)
1907–1909	Oldham Athletic	34	(9)
1909	Preston North End	0	(0)
1909–1910	Croydon Common	39	(20)
1910–1913	Crewe Alexandra		
1913	Newton Heath Alliance		
Total		54	(10)
- * Club domestic league appearances and goals

Francis James Hesham (1879 – 17 November 1915) was an English professional footballer who played in the Football League for Manchester City, Oldham Athletic and Stoke.

== Career ==
Hesham began his career with Manchester City, for whom he made two appearances during the 1896–97 season. After three years with non-league club Gorton St Francis, he made a further appearance for Manchester City in January 1901. He then began a journeyman career and played for Crewe Alexandra (two spells), Accrington Stanley, Leyton, Oldham Athletic, Preston North End, Croydon Common and Newton Heath Alliance, before retiring in 1913.

== Personal life ==
Hesham was married with a son. Prior to the First World War, he served in the Manchester Regiment and later worked as a clerk in Manchester. In November 1914, during the early months of the war, Hesham enlisted as a gunner in the Royal Garrison Artillery. He was posted to France in May 1915 and was killed near Ypres on 17 November 1915. Hesham was buried in La Clytte Military Cemetery.

== Career statistics ==
Appearances and goals by club, season and competition
Club	Season	League			FA Cup		Total	
Club	Season	Division	Apps	Goals	Apps	Goals	Apps	Goals
Manchester City	1896–97	Second Division	2	0	0	0	2	0
Manchester City	1900–01	First Division	1	0	0	0	1	0
Manchester City	Manchester City total		3	0	0	0	3	0
Stoke	1904–05	First Division	17	1	0	0	17	1
Leyton	1906–07	Southern League First Division	33	5	0	0	33	5
Oldham Athletic	1907–08	Second Division	25	9	4	1	29	10
Oldham Athletic	1908–09	Second Division	9	0	2	0	11	0
Oldham Athletic	Total		34	9	6	1	40	10
Croydon Common	1909–10	Southern League First Division	28	15	3	2	31	17
Croydon Common	1910–11	Southern League Second Division	11	5	2	3	13	8
Croydon Common	Total		39	20	5	5	44	25
Career Total			126	35	11	6	137	41
