= Alec Whaites =

English footballer

Personal information
- Date of birth: 1884
- Position: Outside left

Senior career*
Years	Team	Apps	(Gls)
- New Brighton Tower
- Linfield
1904–1907	Bradford City	12	(0)
- Oldham Athletic
- * Club domestic league appearances and goals

Alec Whaites (born 1884) was an English professional footballer who played as an outside left.

== Career ==
Whaites spent his early career with New Brighton Tower and Linfield. He signed for Bradford City from Linfield in May 1904, and made 12 league and 1 FA Cup appearances for the club, before moving to Oldham Athletic in September 1907.

== Sources ==
- Frost, Terry (1988). Bradford City A Complete Record 1903-1988. Breedon Books Sport. ISBN 0-907969-38-0.
