= Jimmy Fay =

English footballer

Personal information
- Full name: James Albert Fay
- Date of birth: 29 March 1884
- Place of birth: Southport, England
- Date of death: 1957 (aged 72–73)
- Position: Half-back

Senior career*
Years	Team	Apps	(Gls)
1900–1901	Southport Crescent		
1901–1902	Southport Blue Star		
1902–1903	Southport Working Lads		
1903–1904	Chorley		
1904–1907	Oswaldtwistle Rovers		
1907–1911	Oldham Athletic	154	(37)
1911–1921	Bolton Wanderers	128	(5)
1921–1923	Southport	25	(1)
1923	Hesketh Park		
Total		307	(43)
- * Club domestic league appearances and goals

James Albert Fay (29 March 1884–1957) was an English footballer who played in the Football League for Bolton Wanderers, Oldham Athletic and Southport.
