= Frank Newton (footballer, born 1882) =

British footballer (1882–1959)

Personal information
- Full name: Leonard Francis Newton
- Date of birth: Quarter 3 1882
- Place of birth: Denaby, England
- Date of death: 27 February 1959 (aged 76)
- Place of death: Warsop, England
- Position: Centre forward

Senior career*
Years	Team	Apps	(Gls)
1902–1905	Chesterfield	98	(23)
1905–1906	Leyton		
1906–1907	Bradford City	17	(5)
1907–1909	Oldham Athletic	81	(45)
1909–1911	Bradford Park Avenue	33	(13)
1911	Burnley	6	(2)
- * Club domestic league appearances and goals

Leonard Francis Newton (Quarter 3 1882 – 27 February 1959) was a footballer who played as a centre forward. He played for five different teams in the Football League.

Newton was the brother of Frederick Newton who kept goal occasionally for Chesterfield and played cricket for Derbyshire.
