= Leeds City F.C. =

Former association football club in England

Leeds City
- Full name: Leeds City Football Club
- Nicknames: The Peacocks; The Citizens; City
- Founded: 1904
- Dissolved: 1919; 107 years ago
- Ground: Elland Road, Leeds
- League: Second Division
- 1919–20: Second Division (expelled)
Home colours

Leeds City Football Club was the leading professional club in Leeds, England, before the First World War. The club was highly successful in the wartime football league; however, it faced sanction for paying its players during wartime which had been made illegal. The club was dissolved in 1919 after the club's directors failed to co-operate with the subsequent FA inquiry. In 1919 Leeds United was established as a replacement.

== History ==
The club was established in 1904, taking the coat of arms of Leeds as the club badge and adopting blue, yellow and white as the club's colours. They were elected to the Football League in 1905. The original secretary, a role that then also carried the modern responsibilities of manager and coach, was Gilbert Gillies (1904–1908) who was followed by Frank Scott-Walford. In 1912, they appointed Herbert Chapman who guided the club to their highest position in the league (4th in the Second Division).

Leeds City's entire league career was in the Second Division. However, during the First World War the club won several wartime honours under the stewardship of Herbert Chapman. Following the conclusion of the war a scandal ensued and the club was accused of financial irregularities, including breaking the ban on paying players during the war, that led to the club's dissolution in 1919. They were expelled from The Football League eight games into the 1919–20 season. The harsh punishment was handed down mostly because of the behaviour of the club's directors, who refused to co-operate in an FA inquiry, and refused to hand over the club's financial records.

Port Vale took over their remaining fixtures (as well as their results up to that point). Leeds City were the first club to be expelled from the League mid-season, and one of only two to be expelled from the League due to financial irregularities, with Bury expelled a century later in 2019. Ironically, Leeds City's successors, Port Vale, nearly lost their League status for similar reasons in 1968, although they ultimately managed to retain it in an end-of-season vote among the other clubs. On 17 October 1919, an auction was held at the Metropole Hotel in Leeds, where the playing staff was auctioned off along with other assets of the club. The 16 members of the playing squad were bought by nine clubs for a total of £9,250:

Player	Destination	Bid
Billy McLeod	Notts County	£1,250
Harry Millership	Rotherham County	£1,000
John Hampson	Aston Villa	£1,000
Willis Walker	South Shields	£800
Tommy Lamph	Manchester City	£800
James Edmondson	Sheffield Wednesday	£800
Bill Hopkins	South Shields	£600
George Affleck	Grimsby Town	£500
Ernest Goodwin	Manchester City	£500
Billy Kirton	Aston Villa	£500
William Ashurst	Lincoln City	£500
Fred Linfoot	Lincoln City	£250
Herbert Lounds	Rotherham County	£250
Arthur Wainwright	Grimsby Town	£200
Billy Short	Hartlepools United	£200
Frank Chipperfield	Lincoln City	£100

In the wake of its demise, Leeds United was formed, and entered the Football League the following year. None of the players auctioned ever played for the new Leeds United, but winger Ivan Sharpe, who had scored 17 goals in 65 appearances for City between 1913 and 1915, spent 2½ years at United between 1920 and 1923 only making one appearance and right-half Harry Sherwin, who left City just five months before its dissolution, went on to score twice in 107 games for United between 1921 and 1925.

=== Subsequent clubs ===
A second Leeds City was established in 1924 as an amateur club and joined the Yorkshire League. That club folded after leaving the league at the end of the 1926–27 season.

Another Leeds City was formed in 2006 and joined Division Two of the West Yorkshire League. They were Division Two runners-up in their first season, earning promotion to Division One. The following season saw them finish as runners-up in Division One, resulting in promotion to the Premier Division. As of 2024, they are competing in Division One of The West Yorkshire League.

== Ground ==
Having originally played at the Wellington Ground, the club moved into Elland Road after Holbeck Rugby Club folded in October 1904. In their first season in the Football League their average attendance was 10,025, the third highest in the Second Division. Their best season, 1913–14, saw them average 15,845.

== League and cup history ==
=== League ===
Season	Division	Played	Won	Draw	Lost	GF	GA	Pts.	Pos.	Notes
1905–06	Second Division	38	17	9	12	59	47	43	6th/20	Elected into Football League Second Division
1906–07	Second Division	38	13	10	15	55	63	36	10th/20	
1907–08	Second Division	38	12	8	18	53	65	32	12th/20	
1908–09	Second Division	38	14	7	17	43	53	35	12th/20	
1909–10	Second Division	38	10	7	21	46	80	27	17th/20	
1910–11	Second Division	38	15	7	16	58	56	37	11th/20	
1911–12	Second Division	38	10	8	20	50	78	28	19th/20	Re-elected.
1912–13	Second Division	38	15	10	13	70	64	40	6th/20	
1913–14	Second Division	38	20	7	11	76	46	47	4th/20	
All competitions suspended due to World War I.
1919–20	Second Division	8	4	2	2	17	10	10	–	Expelled from the Football League. Remaining fixtures taken over by Port Vale.

=== Cup ===
Season	Competition	Round	Opponent	Result	Home/Away	Notes
1905–06	–	–	–	–	–	
1906–07	FA Cup	First	Bristol City	1–4	Away	
1907–08	FA Cup	First	Oldham Athletic	1–2	Away	
1908–09	FA Cup	First	Oldham Athletic	1–1	Away	
1908–09	FA Cup	First	Oldham Athletic	2–1	Home	Replay.
1908–09	FA Cup	Second	West Ham United	1–1	Home	
1908–09	FA Cup	Second	West Ham United	1–2	Away	Replay.
1909–10	FA Cup	First	Sunderland	0–1	Away	
1910–11	FA Cup	First	Brighton & Hove Albion	1–3	Home	
1911–12	FA Cup	First	Glossop	1–0	Home	
1911–12	FA Cup	Second	West Bromwich Albion	0–1	Home	
1912–13	FA Cup	First	Burnley	2–3	Home	
1913–14	FA Cup	First	Gainsborough Trinity	4–2	Home	
1913–14	FA Cup	Second	West Bromwich Albion	0–2	Home	
1914–15	FA Cup	First	Derby County	2–1	Away	
1914–15	FA Cup	Second	Queens Park Rangers	0–1	Away	

== Honours ==
War-time

- Midland Sub Tournament North: Winners 1915–16
- Midland Section: Winners 1916–17, 1917–18
- League Championship Cup: Winners 1917–18
