= 1993–94 Oldham Athletic A.F.C. season =

Oldham Athletic
1993–94 season
- Chairman: Ian Stott
- Manager: Joe Royle
- Stadium: Boundary Park
- Premier League: 21st (relegated)
- FA Cup: Semi–finals
- Coca–Cola Cup: Fourth round
- Top goalscorer: League: Graeme Sharp (9); All: Graeme Sharp (11)
- Highest home attendance: 16,708 vs. Manchester United
- Lowest home attendance: 6,433 vs. Swansea City (League Cup)
- Average home league attendance: 12,563
Home colours	Away colours	Third colours

During the 1993–94 English football season, Oldham Athletic competed in the FA Premier League.

== Season summary ==
Oldham Athletic's luck finally ran out on the final day of the season as their failure to beat Norwich City condemned them to relegation after three years in the top flight. A year earlier, they had won their final three games of the season to stay up on goal difference and, this time round, they had looked more than capable of beating the drop without needing any last-gasp "Houdini" survival acts. They even looked on course for their first-ever FA Cup final as they entered the final minute of the semi-final beating Manchester United 1–0.

But Mark Hughes then equalised for United and forced a replay, in which a visibly downbeat Latics were crushed 4–1 at Maine Road. The team seemed to lose its fighting spirit in the final weeks of the season, and the results of other relegation-threatened teams would have sent them down even if they had managed to beat Norwich on that final day.

Yet there was no pressure for manager Joe Royle, the longest-serving manager in any division, to be removed from his position. The board kept faith in him and he kept faith in his players, with Mike Milligan (to Norwich) being the only significant departure of the close season.

The season had started dismally with a 3–0 home defeat to Ipswich Town, who would only narrowly avoid relegation at the end of the season after a decent start was followed by a slump. The next game saw Oldham win 1–0 at newly promoted Swindon Town, but then came a 10-match winless run which included five draws. The winless run ended on 30 October when a Darren Beckford goal gave them a 1–0 win at Chelsea. Three successive defeats followed before Oldham recorded their third league win of the campaign, a 2–1 home win over high flying Norwich City. There were a number of decent results after the turn of 1994, including two successive 2–1 home wins followed by a point at home to Leeds United. On 2 April, a 4–1 home win over Queen's Park Rangers suggested that the Latics were more than capable of survival. And they also had an FA Cup semi-final clash with Manchester United at Wembley to look forward to. First they had to meet United in the league at Old Trafford, and gave them a serious run for their money as the table-leading hosts managed a narrow 3–2 win. However, then came the semi-final, which went to a replay which the Latics lost, leaving them with Premier League survival to focus on. Three successive defeats did them no favours (a poor 2–1 home loss to West Ham United, a narrow 3–2 defeat at in-form Newcastle United - including two Oldham equalisers - and a 3–0 defeat at Wimbledon), and draws against the two Sheffield teams and a defeat at home to Tottenham Hotspur left them needing to beat Norwich City at Carrow Road on the final day of the season to stand any chance of survival. A 1–1 draw was not enough, and Oldham's three-year stay in the top flight was over.

== Final league table ==
Pos	Team	Pld	W	D	L	GF	GA	GD	Pts	Qualification or relegation
18	Southampton	42	12	7	23	49	66	−17	43	
19	Ipswich Town	42	9	16	17	35	58	−23	43	
20	Sheffield United (R)	42	8	18	16	42	60	−18	42	Relegation to Football League First Division
21	Oldham Athletic (R)	42	9	13	20	42	68	−26	40	Relegation to Football League First Division
22	Swindon Town (R)	42	5	15	22	47	100	−53	30	Relegation to Football League First Division

Source: Premier League
Rules for classification: 1) points; 2) goal difference; 3) number of goals scored.
(R) Relegated

== Results ==
Oldham Athletic's score comes first

=== Legend ===
Win	Draw	Loss

=== FA Premier League ===
Date	Opponent	Venue	Result	Attendance	Scorers
14 August 1993	Ipswich Town	H	0–3	12,182	
18 August 1993	Swindon Town	A	1–0	11,970	Bernard
21 August 1993	Blackburn Rovers	A	0–1	13,731	
24 August 1993	Coventry City	H	3–3	10,872	Ritchie (pen), Bernard, Olney
28 August 1993	Wimbledon	H	1–1	10,633	Bernard
30 August 1993	Leeds United	A	0–1	28,717	
11 September 1993	Everton	H	0–1	13,666	
18 September 1993	Tottenham Hotspur	A	0–5	24,614	
25 September 1993	Aston Villa	H	1–1	12,836	Halle
4 October 1993	Manchester City	A	1–1	21,401	Sharp
16 October 1993	Liverpool	A	1–2	32,661	Beckford
23 October 1993	Arsenal	H	0–0	12,105	
30 October 1993	Chelsea	A	1–0	15,372	Beckford
8 November 1993	Newcastle United	H	1–3	13,821	Jobson
20 November 1993	West Ham United	A	0–2	17,251	
24 November 1993	Sheffield Wednesday	A	0–3	18,509	
27 November 1993	Norwich City	H	2–1	10,198	Sharp, Makin
4 December 1993	Ipswich Town	A	0–0	12,004	
7 December 1993	Swindon Town	H	2–1	10,771	Holden, Halle
11 December 1993	Blackburn Rovers	H	1–2	13,887	Holden
18 December 1993	Coventry City	A	1–1	11,800	Bernard
27 December 1993	Queens Park Rangers	A	0–2	13,218	
29 December 1993	Manchester United	H	2–5	16,708	Sharp, Holden
1 January 1994	Sheffield United	A	1–2	17,066	Jobson
15 January 1994	Liverpool	H	0–3	14,573	
22 January 1994	Arsenal	A	1–1	26,524	Sharp
5 February 1994	Southampton	H	2–1	9,982	McCarthy, Bernard
12 February 1994	Chelsea	H	2–1	12,022	Jobson, Sharp
28 February 1994	Leeds United	H	1–1	11,136	Sharp (penalty missed) , Beckford
5 March 1994	Everton	A	1–2	20,881	Sharp
19 March 1994	Aston Villa	A	2–1	21,214	Beckford, Holden
26 March 1994	Manchester City	H	0–0	16,464	
30 March 1994	Southampton	A	3–1	14,101	Benali (own goal), Sharp, Holden
2 April 1994	Queens Park Rangers	H	4–1	10,440	Jobson, McCarthy, Beckford, A McCarthy (own goal)
4 April 1994	Manchester United	A	2–3	44,686	McCarthy, Sharp
16 April 1994	West Ham United	H	1–2	11,669	Holden (pen)
23 April 1994	Newcastle United	A	2–3	32,216	Jobson, Sharp
26 April 1994	Wimbledon	A	0–3	6,766	
30 April 1994	Sheffield Wednesday	H	0–0	12,967	
3 May 1994	Sheffield United	H	1–1	14,779	Beckford
5 May 1994	Tottenham Hotspur	H	0–2	14,283	
7 May 1994	Norwich City	A	1–1	20,394	McCarthy

=== FA Cup ===
Round	Date	Opponent	Venue	Result	Attendance	Goalscorers
R3	8 January 1994	Derby County	H	2–1	12,810	Beckford, Holden
R4	29 January 1994	Stoke City	H	0–0	14,465	
R4R	9 February 1994	Stoke City	A	1–0	19,871	Beckford
R5	19 February 1994	Barnsley	H	1–0	15,685	Ritchie
QF	12 March 1994	Bolton Wanderers	A	1–0	20,321	Beckford
SF	9 April 1994	Manchester United	N	1–1 (a.e.t.)	56,399	Pointon
SFR	13 April 1994	Manchester United	N	1–4	32,311	Pointon

=== League Cup ===
Round	Date	Opponent	Venue	Result	Attendance	Goalscorers
R2 1st leg	21 September 1993	Swansea City	A	1–2	5,056	Sharp
R2 2nd leg	6 October 1993	Swansea City	H	2–0 (won 3–2 on agg)	6,433	Bernard, Halle
R3	26 October 1993	Coventry City	H	2–0	10,071	Beckford, Sharp
R4	30 November 1993	Tranmere Rovers	A	0–3	9,477	

== First-team squad ==
Squad at end of season

Note: Flags indicate national team as defined under FIFA eligibility rules; some limited exceptions apply. Players may hold more than one non-FIFA nationality.

No.	Pos.	Nation	Player
1	GK	ENG	Paul Gerrard
2	DF	ENG	Craig Fleming
3	DF	ENG	Neil Pointon
4	MF	ENG	Nick Henry
5	DF	ENG	Richard Jobson
6	DF	ENG	Steve Redmond
7	DF	NOR	Gunnar Halle
8	MF	ENG	Andy Ritchie
9	FW	ENG	Ian Olney
10	MF	IRL	Mike Milligan (Note: Milligan was born in Manchester, England, but also qualified to represent the Republic of Ireland internationally and represented them at U-21, U-23, and B level before making his international debut for Republic of Ireland in 1992.) (captain)
11	MF	SCO	Paul Bernard
13	GK	ENG	Jon Hallworth
14	FW	SCO	Graeme Sharp
15	DF	ENG	Andy Barlow

No.	Pos.	Nation	Player
16	DF	NOR	Tore Pedersen
17	FW	ENG	Darren Beckford
18	DF	ENG	Neil McDonald
19	FW	ENG	Roger Palmer
20	MF	ENG	Mark Brennan
21	FW	WAL	Sean McCarthy
22	DF	ENG	Chris Makin
23	DF	ENG	Richard Graham
24	GK	ENG	Andy Woods
25	MF	ENG	Rick Holden
27	MF	ENG	David Beresford
28	FW	ENG	John Eyre
29	MF	ENG	Stephen Price

=== Left club during season ===
Note: Flags indicate national team as defined under FIFA eligibility rules; some limited exceptions apply. Players may hold more than one non-FIFA nationality.

No.	Pos.	Nation	Player
12	MF	ENG	Neil Adams (to Norwich City)
21	FW	ENG	Neil Tolson (to Bradford City)

No.	Pos.	Nation	Player
26	GK	ENG	Lance Key (on loan from Sheffield Wednesday)
30	GK	ENG	Gary Walsh (on loan from Manchester United)
