= 1990–91 Oldham Athletic A.F.C. season =

Oldham Athletic
1990–91 season
- Chairman: Ian Stott
- Manager: Joe Royle
- Stadium: Boundary Park
- Second Division: 1st
- FA Cup: Fourth round
- League Cup: Third round
- Top goalscorer: Ian Marshall (18)
Home colours	Away colours	Third colours

During the 1990–91 English football season, Oldham Athletic A.F.C. competed in the Football League Second Division. A 1st-placed finish in the final table saw promotion and a place in the Football League First Division for the 1991–92 season.

== Season summary ==
Oldham enjoyed promotion to the top flight after an absence of 68 years after finishing in 1st place.

== Results ==
Home team's score comes first

=== Legend ===
Win	Draw	Loss

=== Football League Second Division ===
Date	Opponent	Venue	Result
25 August 1990	Wolves	A	2–3
28 August 1990	Leicester	H	2–0
1 September 1990	Portsmouth	H	3–1
8 September 1990	Barnsley	A	0–1
15 September 1990	Oxford	H	3–0
18 September 1990	Charlton	H	1–1
22 September 1990	Middlesbrough	A	0–1
29 September 1990	West Brom	A	0–0
2 October 1990	Swindon	H	3–2
6 October 1990	Blackburn	H	1–1
13 October 1990	Hull	A	2–2
20 October 1990	Bristol C	A	1–2
23 October 1990	Ipswich	H	2–0
27 October 1990	Notts Co	H	2–1
3 November 1990	Sheff Weds	A	2–2
10 November 1990	Watford	H	4–1
17 November 1990	Port Vale	A	1–0
24 November 1990	Bristol R	A	2–0
1 December 1990	Brighton	H	6–1
15 December 1990	Wolves	H	4–1
21 December 1990	Plymouth	H	5–3
26 December 1990	West Ham	A	2–0
29 December 1990	Millwall	A	0–0
1 January 1991	Newcastle	H	1–1
12 January 1991	Portsmouth	A	1–4
19 January 1991	Barnsley	H	2–0
2 February 1991	Oxford	A	5–1
16 February 1991	Port Vale	H	2–0
23 February 1991	Watford	A	1–1
2 March 1991	Brighton	A	1–2
9 March 1991	Bristol R	H	2–0
12 March 1991	Swindon	A	2–2
16 March 1991	West Brom	H	2–1
20 March 1991	Hull	H	1–2
23 March 1991	Blackburn	A	2–0
29 March 1991	West Ham	H	1–1
1 April 1991	Plymouth	A	1–2
6 April 1991	Millwall	H	1–1
10 April 1991	Leicester	A	0–0
13 April 1991	Newcastle	A	3–2
16 April 1991	Charlton	A	1–1
20 April 1991	Bristol C	H	2–1
27 April 1991	Ipswich	A	1–2
4 May 1991	Notts Co	A	2–0
7 May 1991	Middlesbrough	H	2–0
11 May 1991	Sheff Weds	H	3–2

=== FA Cup ===
Round	Date	Opponent	Venue	Result
R3	5 January 1991	Brentford	H	3–1
R4	26 January 1991	Notts Co	A	2–0

=== League Cup ===
Round	Date	Opponent	Venue	Result
R2 1st leg	25 September 1990	Notts Co	A	1–0
R2 2nd leg	10 October 1990	Notts Co	H	5–2 (AET) (won 5–3 on aggregate)
R3	31 October 1990	Leeds	A	2–0

== Players ==
=== First-team squad ===
Note: Flags indicate national team as defined under FIFA eligibility rules; some limited exceptions apply. Players may hold more than one non-FIFA nationality.

Pos.	Nation	Player
GK	ENG	Jon Hallworth
GK	ENG	John Keeley
GK	ENG	Mike Pollitt (on loan from Manchester United)
DF	ENG	Andy Barlow
DF	ENG	Earl Barrett (captain)
DF	IRL	Derek Brazil (on loan from Manchester United)
DF	SCO	Willie Donachie
DF	NOR	Gunnar Halle
DF	WAL	Andy Holden
DF	ENG	Richard Jobson
DF	ENG	Paul Warhurst
DF	ENG	Gary Williams
MF	ENG	Neil Adams
MF	SCO	Paul Bernard

Pos.	Nation	Player
MF	ENG	Mike Fillery
MF	ENG	Nick Henry
MF	ENG	Rick Holden
MF	SCO	Paul Kane
MF	NIR	Norman Kelly
MF	WAL	Steve Morgan
MF	ENG	Neil Redfearn
MF	ENG	Ian Thompstone
FW	ENG	David Currie
FW	ENG	Ian Marshall
FW	ENG	Paul Moulden
FW	ENG	Roger Palmer
FW	ENG	Andy Ritchie
