= 1991–92 Oldham Athletic A.F.C. season =

Oldham Athletic
1991–92 season
- Chairman: Ian Stott
- Manager: Joe Royle
- Stadium: Boundary Park
- First Division: 17th
- FA Cup: Third round
- League Cup: Fourth round
- Full Members Cup: Second round
- Top goalscorer: League: Sharp (12); All: Sharp (15)
- Highest home attendance: 18,952 vs. Liverpool
- Lowest home attendance: 7,250 vs. Torquay United (League Cup)
- Average home league attendance: 15,087
Home colours	Away colours

During the 1991–92 English football season, Oldham Athletic A.F.C. competed in the Football League First Division, where they had last played in 1923. A 17th-place finish in the final table was enough for survival and a place in the new FA Premier League for the 1992–93 season.

== Season summary ==
Oldham enjoyed a comfortable return to the top flight after 68 years and finished in 17th, nine points clear of relegation. Although the club only won away three times during the season, strong home form – Oldham only lost five times at home and notably took the scalps of eventual champions Leeds United and eventual third-placed Sheffield Wednesday – proved pivotal in keeping Oldham up.

The season was the first at Boundary Park for striker Graeme Sharp, who joined the club after a long and successful spell at Everton and finished as one of the division's top scorers with 16 goals. Following Sharp to Oldham was midfielder Mike Milligan, who had transferred in the opposite direction a year earlier.

== Final league table ==
Pos	Team	Pld	W	D	L	GF	GA	GD	Pts	Qualification or relegation
15	Tottenham Hotspur	42	15	7	20	58	63	−5	52	Qualification for the FA Premier League
16	Southampton	42	14	10	18	39	55	−16	52	Qualification for the FA Premier League
17	Oldham Athletic	42	14	9	19	63	67	−4	51	Qualification for the FA Premier League
18	Norwich City	42	11	12	19	47	63	−16	45	Qualification for the FA Premier League
19	Coventry City	42	11	11	20	35	44	−9	44	Qualification for the FA Premier League

Source: World Football
Rules for classification: 1) Points; 2) Goal difference; 3) Goals scored

== Results ==
Oldham Athletic's score comes first

=== Legend ===
Win	Draw	Loss

=== Football League First Division ===
Date	Opponent	Venue	Result	Attendance	Scorers
17 August 1991	Liverpool	A	1–2	38,841	Barrett
21 August 1991	Chelsea	H	3–0	14,997	Marshall, R. Holden, Currie
24 August 1991	Norwich City	H	2–2	13,584	Marshall, Barrett
28 August 1991	Manchester United	A	0–1	42,078	
31 August 1991	Nottingham Forest	A	1–3	23,244	Marshall
3 September 1991	Coventry City	H	2–1	12,996	Adams, Henry
7 September 1991	Sheffield United	H	2–1	15,064	Snodin, Marshall
14 September 1991	Luton Town	A	1–2	9,005	Marshall
21 September 1991	Crystal Palace	H	2–3	13,391	Marshall, R. Holden
28 September 1991	Manchester City	A	2–1	31,271	Sharp (2)
5 October 1991	Southampton	H	1–1	13,133	Henry
19 October 1991	West Ham United	H	2–2	14,365	McDonald, Breacker (own goal)
26 October 1991	Leeds United	A	0–1	28,199	
2 November 1991	Notts County	A	0–2	10,634	
16 November 1991	Arsenal	H	1–1	15,681	Barlow
23 November 1991	Queens Park Rangers	A	3–1	10,947	Henry, Palmer, Sharp
30 November 1991	Aston Villa	H	3–2	15,370	Sharp (2, 1 pen), Palmer
7 December 1991	Wimbledon	A	1–2	5,011	Sharp (penalty missed) , Marshall (pen)
14 December 1991	Everton	H	2–2	15,955	Palmer, Milligan
21 December 1991	Chelsea	A	2–4	15,136	Marshall (2)
26 December 1991	Manchester United	H	3–6	18,947	Sharp, Milligan, Bernard
28 December 1991	Nottingham Forest	H	2–1	16,496	Sharp, Bernard
1 January 1992	Sheffield Wednesday	A	1–1	32,679	Adams
11 January 1992	Norwich City	A	2–1	12,986	R. Holden, Bernard
18 January 1992	Liverpool	H	2–3	18,952	Adams, Bernard
25 January 1992	Tottenham Hotspur	A	0–0	21,843	
1 February 1992	West Ham United	A	0–1	20,012	
8 February 1992	Leeds United	H	2–0	18,409	Bernard, Barlow
15 February 1992	Queens Park Rangers	H	2–1	13,092	R. Holden, Jobson
22 February 1992	Aston Villa	A	0–1	21,509	
29 February 1992	Wimbledon	H	0–1	12,166	
7 March 1992	Everton	A	1–2	25,014	Fleming
10 March 1992	Arsenal	A	1–2	23,096	Ritchie
14 March 1992	Notts County	H	4–3	12,125	Ritchie (2), R. Holden, Marshall
21 March 1992	Coventry City	A	1–1	13,840	Henry
28 March 1992	Sheffield Wednesday	H	3–0	16,897	Sharp, Jobson, Adams
4 April 1992	Sheffield United	A	0–2	20,843	
11 April 1992	Luton Town	H	5–1	13,210	Sharp (4), Milligan
18 April 1992	Crystal Palace	A	0–0	13,267	
20 April 1992	Tottenham Hotspur	H	1–0	15,443	Henry
25 April 1992	Southampton	A	0–1	16,857	
2 May 1992	Manchester City	H	2–5	18,558	Henry, Moulden

=== FA Cup ===
Round	Date	Opponent	Venue	Result	Attendance	Goalscorers
R3	4 January 1992	Leyton Orient	H	1–1	12,606	Sharp
R3R	15 January 1992	Leyton Orient	A	2–4	11,152	Adams, Palmer

=== League Cup ===
Round	Date	Opponent	Venue	Result	Attendance	Goalscorers
R2 1st leg	24 September 1991	Torquay United	H	7–1	7,250	Ritchie (4), Sharp, Henry, Milligan
R2 2nd leg	9 October 1991	Torquay United	A	2–0 (won 9–1 on agg)	1,955	R. Holden, Jobson
R3	29 October 1991	Derby County	H	2–1	11,219	Palmer, Sharp
R4	4 December 1991	Manchester United	A	0–2	38,550	

=== Full Members Cup ===
Round	Date	Opponent	Venue	Result	Attendance	Goalscorers
NR2	1 October 1991	Everton	A	2–3	4,588	R. Holden, Milligan

== Squad ==
Note: Flags indicate national team as defined under FIFA eligibility rules; some limited exceptions apply. Players may hold more than one non-FIFA nationality.

Pos.	Nation	Player
GK	ENG	Paul Gerrard
GK	ENG	Jon Hallworth
GK	ENG	John Keeley
DF	ENG	Andy Barlow
DF	ENG	Earl Barrett
DF	ENG	Craig Fleming
DF	NOR	Gunnar Halle
DF	WAL	Andy Holden
DF	ENG	Richard Jobson
DF	ENG	Brian Kilcline
DF	ENG	Chris Makin
DF	ENG	Neil McDonald
MF	ENG	Neil Adams
MF	SCO	Paul Bernard
MF	ENG	Nick Henry

Pos.	Nation	Player
MF	ENG	Rick Holden
MF	SCO	Paul Kane
MF	IRL	Mike Milligan (captain)
MF	ENG	Neil Redfearn
MF	ENG	Glynn Snodin (on loan from Leeds United)
MF	ENG	Ian Thompstone
FW	ENG	David Currie
FW	ENG	Ian Marshall
FW	ENG	Paul Moulden
FW	ENG	Roger Palmer
FW	ENG	Andy Ritchie
FW	SCO	Graeme Sharp
FW	ENG	Neil Tolson

== Transfers ==
=== In ===
Date	Pos	Name	From	Fee
17 July 1991	MF	Mike Milligan	Everton	£600,000
1 August 1991	DF	Brian Kilcline	Coventry City	£400,000
15 August 1991	DF	Craig Fleming	Halifax Town	£80,000
1 October 1991	DF	Neil McDonald	Everton	£500,000
24 March 1992	FW	Neil Tolson	Walsall	£150,000

=== Out ===
Date	Pos	Name	To	Fee
5 September 1991	MF	Neil Redfearn	Barnsley	£150,000
5 September 1991	FW	David Currie	Barnsley	£250,000
22 November 1991	MF	Paul Kane	Aberdeen	£350,000
23 January 1992	MF	Ian Thompstone	Exeter City	Free transfer
19 February 1992	DF	Brian Kilcline	Newcastle United	£250,000
25 February 1992	DF	Earl Barrett	Aston Villa	£1,700,000

Transfers in: ▼£1,730,000
Transfers out: ▲£2,700,000
Total spending: ▲£970,000
