= 1992–93 Oldham Athletic A.F.C. season =

Oldham Athletic
1992–93 season
- Chairman: Ian Stott
- Manager: Joe Royle
- Stadium: Boundary Park
- FA Premier League: 19th
- FA Cup: Third round
- League Cup: Fourth round
- Top goalscorer: League: Olney (12); All: Olney (13)
- Highest home attendance: 17,106 vs. Manchester United
- Lowest home attendance: 6,269 vs. Exeter City (League Cup)
- Average home league attendance: 12,859
Home colours	Away colours	Third colours

During the 1992–93 English football season, Oldham Athletic competed in the inaugural season of the FA Premier League, their second season since promotion back to the top flight of English football, and secured a third successive season at this level thanks to a three-match winning run at the end of the season which saved them from relegation on goal difference.

== Season summary ==
Oldham started the season well and stood in midtable after eleven games, but struggled thereafter and were bottom of the Premier League with ten games left to play. Two successive wins briefly lifted Oldham out of the relegation zone, but failed to win any of their next four matches and looked dead and buried with three games left to play. For the club to survive relegation, three wins from their final three matches were required, and the Latics had to bank on Crystal Palace gaining no more than one point from their final two matches. Oldham's first game of the final trio was away at second placed Aston Villa, who had to win to have any hope of winning that year's title. In a battling display, Nick Henry scored the winner midway through the first half, a shock result but one that gave hope to an unlikely escape and clinched the first title for 26 years for Oldham's local rivals Manchester United. Three days later, Liverpool were beaten 3–2 at Boundary Park, whilst Crystal Palace gained a draw at Manchester City. For Oldham to survive, they would have to beat fellow strugglers Southampton at home and hope that Crystal Palace were defeated at Arsenal. Having led 4–1 at one point, Oldham survived a late Southampton comeback to win 4–3. Palace lost 3–0 at Arsenal, meaning that the Eagles were relegated on goal difference (-13 versus Oldham's -11), though even if Palace lost only 1–0, they still would've been relegated on goals scored (Oldham had 63 goals scored for them whereas Palace had 48 scored for them).

== Final league table ==
Pos	Team	Pld	W	D	L	GF	GA	GD	Pts	Qualification or relegation
17	Leeds United	42	12	15	15	57	62	−5	51	
18	Southampton	42	13	11	18	54	61	−7	50	
19	Oldham Athletic	42	13	10	19	63	74	−11	49	
20	Crystal Palace (R)	42	11	16	15	48	61	−13	49	Relegation to Football League First Division
21	Middlesbrough (R)	42	11	11	20	54	75	−21	44	Relegation to Football League First Division

Source: Premier League
Rules for classification: 1) points; 2) goal difference; 3) number of goals scored.
(R) Relegated

== Results ==
Oldham Athletic's score comes first

=== Legend ===
Win	Draw	Loss

=== FA Premier League ===
Date	Opponent	Venue	Result	Attendance	Scorers
15 August 1992	Chelsea	A	1–1	20,699	Henry
19 August 1992	Crystal Palace	H	1–1	11,063	Sharp
22 August 1992	Nottingham Forest	H	5–3	11,632	Adams, Sharp, Henry, Halle, Bernard
26 August 1992	Arsenal	A	0–2	20,796	
29 August 1992	Manchester City	A	3–3	27,288	Jobson, Milligan, Halle
1 September 1992	Leeds United	H	2–2	13,848	Olney (2)
5 September 1992	Coventry City	H	0–1	11,254	
12 September 1992	Crystal Palace	A	2–2	11,224	Olney, Sharp
19 September 1992	Ipswich Town	H	4–2	11,150	Marshall, Sharp, Halle, Henry
26 September 1992	Blackburn Rovers	A	0–2	18,393	Marshall (penalty missed)
4 October 1992	Everton	H	1–0	13,013	Jobson
17 October 1992	Sheffield Wednesday	A	1–2	24,485	Milligan (pen)
24 October 1992	Aston Villa	H	1–1	13,457	Olney
31 October 1992	Southampton	A	0–1	10,827	
9 November 1992	Norwich City	H	2–3	11,081	Sharp, Marshall
21 November 1992	Manchester United	A	0–3	33,497	
28 November 1992	Middlesbrough	H	4–1	12,401	Halle, Pointon, Sharp, Adams
5 December 1992	Queens Park Rangers	A	2–3	11,804	Adams, Olney
12 December 1992	Wimbledon	A	2–5	3,386	Brennan, Milligan
19 December 1992	Tottenham Hotspur	H	2–1	11,735	Sharp, Olney
9 January 1993	Ipswich Town	A	2–1	15,025	Brennan, Bernard
16 January 1993	Blackburn Rovers	H	0–1	13,742	
23 January 1993	Coventry City	A	0–3	10,544	
26 January 1993	Manchester City	H	0–1	14,903	
30 January 1993	Nottingham Forest	A	0–2	21,240	
6 February 1993	Chelsea	H	3–1	11,772	Henry, Adams, Brennan
13 February 1993	Leeds United	A	0–2	27,654	
20 February 1993	Arsenal	H	0–1	12,311	
22 February 1993	Sheffield United	A	0–2	14,628	
27 February 1993	Everton	A	2–2	18,025	Adams (2, 1 pen)
9 March 1993	Manchester United	H	1–0	17,106	Adams
13 March 1993	Norwich City	A	0–1	19,597	
20 March 1993	Queens Park Rangers	H	2–2	10,946	Henry, Adams
22 March 1993	Middlesbrough	A	3–2	12,290	Bernard, Olney, Ritchie
3 April 1993	Wimbledon	H	6–2	11,606	Fashanu (own goal), Bernard, Olney (2), Adams, Beckford
7 April 1993	Sheffield Wednesday	H	1–1	12,312	Pointon
10 April 1993	Liverpool	A	0–1	36,129	
13 April 1993	Sheffield United	H	1–1	14,795	Ritchie
17 April 1993	Tottenham Hotspur	A	1–4	26,663	Beckford
2 May 1993	Aston Villa	A	1–0	37,247	Henry
5 May 1993	Liverpool	H	3–2	15,381	Beckford, Olney (2)
8 May 1993	Southampton	H	4–3	14,597	Pointon, Olney, Ritchie, Halle

=== FA Cup ===
Round	Date	Opponent	Venue	Result	Attendance	Goalscorers
R3	2 January 1993	Tranmere Rovers	H	2–2	13,389	Olney, Bernard
R3R	12 January 1993	Tranmere Rovers	A	0–3	12,525	

=== League Cup ===
Round	Date	Opponent	Venue	Result	Attendance	Goalscorers
R2 First Leg	22 September 1992	Exeter City	A	1–0	4,375	Henry
R2 Second Leg	7 October 1992	Exeter City	H	0–0 (won 1–0 on agg)	6,269	
R3	27 October 1992	Swindon Town	A	1–0	8,811	Bernard
R4	1 December 1992	Cambridge United	A	0–1	5,488	

== Players ==
=== First-team squad ===
Squad at end of season

Note: Flags indicate national team as defined under FIFA eligibility rules; some limited exceptions apply. Players may hold more than one non-FIFA nationality.

Pos.	Nation	Player
GK	ENG	Paul Gerrard
GK	ENG	Ian Gray
GK	ENG	Jon Hallworth
GK	ENG	John Keeley
DF	ENG	Andy Barlow
DF	ENG	Craig Fleming
DF	ENG	Richard Jobson
DF	ENG	Neil McDonald
DF	ENG	Neil Pointon
DF	ENG	Steve Redmond
DF	WAL	Andy Holden
DF	NOR	Gunnar Halle
MF	ENG	Neil Adams

Pos.	Nation	Player
MF	ENG	Mark Brennan
MF	ENG	Nick Henry
MF	ENG	Andy Ritchie
MF	SCO	Paul Bernard
MF	IRL	Mike Milligan (Note: Milligan was born in Manchester, England, but also qualified to represent the Republic of Ireland internationally and represented them at U-21, U-23, and B level before making his international debut for Republic of Ireland in 1992.) (captain)
FW	ENG	Darren Beckford
FW	ENG	Ian Marshall
FW	ENG	Paul Moulden
FW	ENG	Ian Olney
FW	ENG	Roger Palmer
FW	ENG	Neil Tolson
FW	SCO	Graeme Sharp
FW	SUR	Orpheo Keizerweerd

=== Left club during season ===
Note: Flags indicate national team as defined under FIFA eligibility rules; some limited exceptions apply. Players may hold more than one non-FIFA nationality.

Pos.	Nation	Player
DF	ENG	Chris Makin (on loan to Wigan Athletic)
