= List of Oldham Athletic A.F.C. records and statistics =

This article is a list of statistics and records relating to Oldham Athletic Football Club. Oldham Athletic are an English football club based on Oldham. The club was founded in 1895 as Pine Villa Football Club before renaming in 1899. The club joined the Football League in 1907 though did not win a league title until 1952. Oldham Athletic currently play in the League 2 (division), the fourth tier of English football. The club plays their home games at Boundary Park, having moved from Sheepfoot Lane in 1905.

This list encompasses all honours won by Oldham Athletic and any club records, by their managers and players.

All statistics are correct as of the end of Oldham Athletic's 2022-23 season.

== Honours ==
Oldham Athletic's honours include: League

- Second Division / Championship (level 2)
  - Champions: 1990–91
  - Runners-up: 1909–10
- Third Division North / Third Division (level 3)
  - Champions: 1952–53, 1973–74
- Fourth Division (level 4)
  - Runners-up: 1962–63
  - Promoted: 1970–71
- Lancashire Combination
  - Champions: 1906–07

Cup

- Football League Cup
  - Runners-up: 1989–90
- Lancashire Senior Cup
  - Winners: 1908, 1967, 2006
- Anglo-Scottish Cup
  - Runners–up: 1978–79

== Best performances ==
- Highest League finish: 2nd in Football League First Division, 1914–15
- Best FA Cup performance: Semi-finals, 1912–13, 1989–90, 1993–94
- Best League Cup performance: Final, 1989–90

== Managerial records ==
- First manager: David Ashworth
- Longest serving manager by time: Jimmy Frizzell – 12 years, 102 days between 1970 and 1982
- Longest serving manager by games: Joe Royle – 602 competitive games as manager
- Most victories: 225 victories by Joe Royle, 1982–1994

== Players ==
League Appearances

- 525, Ian Wood between 1966 and 1980

Goals

- Season: 33, Tom Davis, Second Division, 1936–37
- League Career: 141, Roger Palmer, between 1980 and 1994
- Overall Career: 156, Roger Palmer, between 1980 and 1994

=== International Caps ===
- 25, Gunnar Halle for Norway, between 1991 and 1996

=== Transfer fees ===
- Received: £1,700,000 for Earl Barrett, Aston Villa (February 1992)
- Paid: £750,000 for Ian Olney, Aston Villa (June 1992)

== Club records ==
=== Victories ===
- Record win: 11–0 v Southport, Fourth Division, 26 December 1962
- Record league win: 11–0 v Southport, Fourth Division, 26 December 1962
- Record FA Cup win: 10–1 v Lytham, first round, 28 November 1925
- Record League Cup win: 7–0 v Scarborough, 25 October 1989

=== Losses ===
- Record league loss: 9

0–9 v Hull City, Third Division North, 5 April 1958
4–13 v Tranmere Rovers, Third Division North, 26 December 1935

=== Attendance ===
- Record attendance
  - 47,671 v Sheffield Wednesday, FA Cup fourth round, 25 January 1930
- League Attendance
  - 45,304 v Blackpool, Second Division, 21 April 1930
- Gate receipts
  - £138,680 v Manchester United, Premier League, 29 December 1993

=== Points ===
- Most points in a season:

Two points for a win: 61 in 42 matches, Third Division, 1973–74
Three points for a win: 88 in 46 matches, Second Division, 1990–91

=== Streaks ===
- Longest winning run: 10 (12 January 1974 – 16 March 1974)
- Longest losing run: 6 (5 February 2005 – 26 February 2005)
- Longest unbeaten run: 17 (25 August 1990 – 10 November 1990)
- Longest run without a win: 17 (9 September 1920 – 25 December 1920)
