= 1989–90 in English football =

Football in England
- Season: 1989–90

Men's football
- First Division: Liverpool
- Second Division: Leeds United
- Third Division: Bristol Rovers
- Fourth Division: Exeter City
- Football Conference: Darlington
- FA Cup: Manchester United
- Associate Members' Cup: Tranmere Rovers
- League Cup: Nottingham Forest
- Charity Shield: Liverpool

The 1989–90 season was the 110th season of competitive football in England.

== Overview ==
English clubs were still banned from competing in European competitions following the Heysel Stadium disaster.

The season marked the beginning of the regular trend for clubs to leave their homes of many years and head for purpose built new stadia, following the bold move to Glanford Park by Scunthorpe United in 1988. Walsall and Chester City brought the curtain down on their many years at Fellows Park and Sealand Road respectively (both with games against Rotherham United). Walsall moved to the Bescot Stadium, while Chester began a groundshare with Macclesfield Town at Moss Rose until their new stadium was completed.

Meanwhile, Football Conference sides Wycombe Wanderers and Yeovil Town relocated to Adams Park and Huish Park respectively.

== Diary of the season ==
1 July 1989 – Midfielder Mike Phelan joins Manchester United in a £750,000 transfer from Norwich City.

5 July 1989 – Lou Macari departs from Swindon Town to succeed John Lyall as manager of West Ham United. He is only the sixth manager to have taken charge of West Ham since their formation in 1900.

6 July 1989 – After just four months at Glasgow Rangers, Mel Sterland leaves the Scottish league champions and returns to England in a move to Second Division Leeds United for £600,000.

8 July 1989 – Olympique Marseille pay Tottenham Hotspur £4.5 million for winger Chris Waddle, a fee that makes him the most expensive British player. After a year in France with Bordeaux, Clive Allen returns to England in a £1million move to newly promoted Manchester City.

10 July 1989 – Scottish striker Mark McGhee returns to Newcastle United on a free transfer from Scottish Cup winners Celtic.

11 July 1989 – Aston Villa sign Kent Nielsen, the Denmark central defender, from Brøndby in a £500,000 deal.

12 July 1989 – Glenn Hysen, the Swedish defender who had been expected to sign for Manchester United, is instead signed by Liverpool. Don Howe, a member of the English coaching staff, resigns as assistant manager of Wimbledon and becomes assistant to Trevor Francis at Queens Park Rangers.

13 July 1989 – Third Division Notts County reject a £750,000 bid for 22–year–old defender Dean Yates.

15 July 1989 – Laurie Cunningham, who played in Wimbledon's FA Cup triumph 14 months ago and had a successful spell with West Bromwich Albion in the late 1970s, dies in a car crash in Spain. He was 33 years old and had been playing for Rayo Vallecano at the time of his death.

17 July 1989 – Liverpool sign 18–year–old defender Steve Harkness from Carlisle United for £75,000. Tottenham Hotspur sign midfielder Steve Sedgley from Coventry City for £750,000.

19 July 1989 – Former Tottenham Hotspur midfielder Ossie Ardiles, 37 next month, is appointed player–manager of Swindon Town.

21 July 1989 – A tribunal orders Manchester United to pay £1.5 million to Nottingham Forest for 26–year–old midfielder Neil Webb.

24 July 1989 – Aston Villa sign Manchester United defender Paul McGrath for £400,000.

26 July 1989 – Norman Whiteside moves from Manchester United to Everton for £750,000.

27 July 1989 – Everton pay Leicester City £1.1 million for striker Mike Newell.

28 July 1989 – Maidstone United prepare for their first Football League season with a £10,000 move for 19–year–old Leytonstone defender Warren Barton.

31 July 1989 – Norwich City pay Coventry City £525,000 for Welsh winger David Phillips.

3 August 1989 – Nottingham Forest pay Leeds United £650,000 for Republic of Ireland midfielder John Sheridan.

7 August 1989 – Everton sign Aston Villa defender Martin Keown for £750,000.

12 August 1989 - Liverpool beat Arsenal 1–0 in the Charity Shield at Wembley. Peter Beardsley scores the only goal of the game.

14 August 1989 – Adrian Heath returns to English football after less than a year in Spain when he joins Aston Villa from Espanyol for £360,000.

18 August 1989 – Property tycoon Michael Knighton agrees to buy control of Manchester United in a deal which is believed to be worth around £20 million.

19 August 1989 – On the first day of the First Division season, champions Arsenal lose 4–1 away to Manchester United, while Liverpool beat Manchester City 3–1. Second Division promotion favourites Newcastle United and Leeds United clash at St James' Park in a match which ends with the home side winning 5–2, with Micky Quinn scoring four goals on his Newcastle debut. In the Second Division, Frank McAvennie breaks his leg in West Ham's 1–1 draw at Stoke and is expected to be out of action until at least the winter.

21 August 1989 – Luton Town pay a club record £650,000 for striker Lars Elstrup from Danish side OB Odense.

22 August 1989 – Tottenham Hotspur sign defender Pat van den Hauwe from Everton for £650,000.

23 August 1989 – Paul Bracewell, who has missed most of the last three years because of injury, joins Sunderland for £250,000.

24 August 1989 – West Ham United boost their Second Division promotion push with a £675,000 move for Queens Park Rangers midfielder Martin Allen, just weeks after a move to First Division champions Arsenal collapsed.

26 August 1989 - Newly promoted Chelsea go top of the First Division after three games with a 4–0 home win over Sheffield Wednesday. Derby County beat Manchester United 2–0 at the Baseball Ground. A Second Division encounter at Dean Court sees AFC Bournemouth beat Hull City 5–4.

29 August 1989 – Gary Pallister becomes Britain's most expensive defender in a £2.3 million move from Middlesbrough to Manchester United.

30 August 1989 - Manchester United suffer another disappointing First Division result, losing 2–0 at home to Norwich City. Coventry City go top of the First Division with a 2–1 home win over Manchester City.

31 August 1989 – The first month of the league season ends with Coventry City as First Division leaders after three wins from four games. Sheffield Wednesday prop up the table, followed by newly promoted Manchester City and Crystal Palace. Defending champions Arsenal occupy a lowly 15th place. In the Second Division, West Ham United lead the table, level on points with Blackburn Rovers. The play-off places are occupied by Sheffield United (newly promoted), Ipswich Town, Watford and newly relegated Newcastle United.

1 September 1989 – John Aldridge agrees to leave Liverpool after nearly three years to join Real Sociedad of Spain for £750,000.

6 September 1989 – England draw 0–0 against Sweden in their fifth World Cup qualifier at Wembley.

9 September 1989 – Millwall beat Coventry City 4–1 at The Den to go top of the First Division in only their second season in the top flight. Manchester United lose for third successive game, going down 3–2 to Everton at Goodison Park. An eight-goal thriller at Carrow Road sees Norwich City and Southampton draw 4–4. In the Second Division, there are nine goals at Bramall Lane as Sheffield United beat Brighton 5–4 to go top of the table.

12 September 1989 – Liverpool defeat Crystal Palace 9–0, with eight different players scoring, including John Aldridge in his last appearance for the club.

14 September 1989 – Manchester United sign midfielder Paul Ince from West Ham United for £1 million.

15 September 1989 – Queens Park Rangers pay £175,000 for Oxford United defender David Bardsley, with striker Mark Stein moving to the Manor Ground in exchange.

16 September 1989 – Ten Swansea City fans receive 16–month prison sentences in Athens after being convicted of fighting with Panathinaikos fans after a European Cup Winners' Cup tie. Mark Hughes scores the season's first hat-trick in the First Division as Manchester United beat Millwall 5–1 at Old Trafford. Everton go top of the First Division with a 1–0 win over Charlton at Selhurst Park.

18 September 1989 – Manchester United sign winger Danny Wallace from Southampton for £1.2 million.

23 September 1989 – Manchester City thrash neighbours United 5–1 in the first Manchester derby since the 1986–87 season. Liverpool win 3–1 at Goodison Park in the Merseyside derby, with Ian Rush scoring twice. Sheffield United are top of the Second Division, with Blackburn Rovers second, level on points with Newcastle United. Sunderland, Leeds United and Brighton & Hove Albion complete the top six. Leicester City, often among the pre–season promotion favourites for the last three seasons, prop up the table and are in danger of relegation to the Third Division for the first time in their history.

30 September 1989 – Liverpool and Chelsea are level on points at the top of the First Division at the end of the month. Sheffield Wednesday, Charlton Athletic and Manchester United languish in the relegation zone.

2 October 1989 – Cyril Knowles, the former Tottenham Hotspur and England left–back, resigns as manager of Torquay United.

3 October 1989 – Dave Smith, the former Plymouth Argyle and Dundee F.C. manager, is appointed manager of Torquay United.

11 October 1989 – England draw 0–0 with Poland in Chorzów to secure World Cup qualification.

21 October 1989 – The last two unbeaten records in the First Division end when Liverpool and Norwich City both lose 4–1 away from home, to Southampton and Luton Town respectively. Manchester United record their third league win of the season with a 4–1 win at Coventry City. Everton go top with a 3–0 home win over Arsenal.

31 October 1989 – October ends with Liverpool as First Division leaders, one point ahead of Everton with a game in hand. Sheffield United remain top of the Second Division, with Leeds United second and the play-off places occupied by Newcastle United, West Ham United, Sunderland and Plymouth Argyle.

2 November 1989 – Everton sign winger Peter Beagrie from Stoke City for £750,000.

3 November 1989 – John Sheridan, who played just once for Nottingham Forest after joining them at the start of the season, is sold to Sheffield Wednesday for £500,000.

4 November 1989 – Chelsea move to the top of the First Division after they beat Millwall 4–0 and Liverpool lose 1–0 at home to Coventry City. Arsenal keep up the pressure by winning a dramatic encounter with Norwich City 4–3 at Highbury. In the Second Division, Swindon Town boost their hopes of reaching the First Division for the first time by beating struggling Stoke 6–0 at the County Ground.

5 November 1989 – Aston Villa record their fifth consecutive League victory with a 6–2 thrashing of Everton at Villa Park.

7 November 1989 – Mick Mills is sacked after four years as manager of Stoke City, who are winless and bottom of the Second Division. His successor is Alan Ball, the 1966 World Cup winner and former Portsmouth manager.

11 November 1989 - Chelsea remain top of the First Division with a 1–0 win at Everton. Derby climb from 17th to 12th place with a 6–0 win over Manchester City at the Baseball Ground. Liverpool's title hopes are dented when they lose 3–2 to QPR at Loftus Road. In the Second Division, West Bromwich Albion beat Barnsley 7–0 at home.

12 November 1989 - A Gary Pallister goal gives Manchester United a 1–0 home win over Nottingham Forest in the First Division.

13 November 1989 – Former England captain Ray Wilkins agrees to join Queens Park Rangers from Glasgow Rangers on a free transfer at the end of this month.

15 November 1989 – Howard Kendall, the former Everton manager, is dismissed by Spanish side Athletic Bilbao.

16 November 1989 – Manchester City sign Blackburn Rovers defender Colin Hendry for £700,000. Three Chelsea fans jailed for hooliganism offences in 1987 are freed after their convictions are quashed by the Court of Appeal.

18 November 1989 - Arsenal go top of the First Division with a 3–0 win over QPR at Highbury. Aston Villa boost their title hopes with a 4–1 home win over Coventry City. Manchester United climb to ninth with a 3–1 win at Luton Town.

21 November 1989 – Nigel Martyn, 23, becomes Britain's first £1 million goalkeeper when he joins Crystal Palace from Bristol Rovers.

25 November 1989 - A nine-goal thriller at The Dell sees Southampton beat Luton Town 6–3, lifting the hosts into fifth place in the First Division. Ewood Park is also the scene of a nine-goal thriller in the Second Division, with Blackburn beating West Ham 5–4 in a promotion crunch game.

26 November 1989 - Liverpool go top of the First Division on goal difference by beating Arsenal 2–1 at Anfield.

27 November 1989 – Queens Park Rangers player–manager Trevor Francis is sacked after just one year in charge.

28 November 1989 – Assistant manager Don Howe succeeds Trevor Francis at Queens Park Rangers.

30 November 1989 – Liverpool, Arsenal, Aston Villa and Chelsea are locked together at the top of the First Division at the end of the month. Manchester City, Queens Park Rangers and Charlton Athletic are level on points at the bottom. Nigel Spackman leaves Queens Park Rangers after nine months to join Rangers.

2 December 1989 - Liverpool remain top of the First Division on goal difference with a 4–1 win over Manchester City at Maine Road, which keeps the hosts at the bottom of the table. Aston Villa keep up the heat with a 2–1 home win over Nottingham Forest, while Chelsea's title bid is hit by a 5–2 home defeat to Wimbledon.

3 December 1989 - Arsenal draw level on points with Liverpool at the top of the First Division when a Perry Groves goal gives them a 1–0 home win over Manchester United.

5 December 1989 – Andy Thorn moves from Newcastle United for Crystal Palace for £650,000.

6 December 1989 – Chelsea bolster their title challenge with a £300,000 move for Bayern Munich and Norway defender Erland Johnsen. Howard Kendall is confirmed as the new Manchester City manager.

9 December 1989 - Arsenal go top of the First Division with a 1–0 win at Coventry City, as Liverpool and Aston Villa draw 1–1 at Anfield. Chelsea's title hopes are further damaged when they lose 4–2 to QPR at Loftus Road. Manchester United's disappointing league campaign continues with a 2–1 home defeat to Crystal Palace.

10 December 1989 – Roy Wegerle, the American international striker, joins Queens Park Rangers from Luton Town for a club record £1million.

16 December 1989 - Arsenal retain their lead of the First Division with a 3–2 home win over Luton Town, but Liverpool keep up the pressure with a 5–2 win over Chelsea at Stamford Bridge. Aston Villa's title hopes are hit by a 2–0 defeat at Millwall, who are now needing the points to stay clear of the relegation zone after topping the table in September. Manchester United suffer a third successive league defeat, going down 1–0 at home to Tottenham Hotspur.

19 December 1989 – 18–year–old Trinidadian striker Dwight Yorke signs for Aston Villa.

23 December 1989 - The last league action before Christmas sees Manchester United hold Liverpool to a goalless draw at Anfield, ensuring that Arsenal remain a point ahead at the top of the table with a game in hand.

26 December 1989 - The Boxing Day action sees Liverpool return to the top of the First Division with a 2–1 win over Sheffield Wednesday at Anfield, as Arsenal lose 1–0 at Southampton. Aston Villa keep up the pressure with a 3–0 win over Manchester United at Villa Park, a result which mounts the pressure on United manager Alex Ferguson, whose team have picked up just two points from their last five games and are now 15th in the league. Norwich City's title hopes are hit by a 1–0 defeat at Manchester City, who climb off the bottom of the table. Charlton Athletic now prop up the First Division, having lost 3–1 at Wimbledon. In the Second Division, the leading pair of Leeds United and Sheffield United draw 2–2 at Bramall Lane. Swindon Town boost their promotion hopes with a 4–3 home win over promotion rivals Blackburn Rovers at the County Ground.

28 December 1989 – West Ham United sign midfielder Ian Bishop and striker Trevor Morley from Manchester City for £500,000 each. Millwall attempt to arrest their dramatic fall down the First Division by playing a club record £800,000 for Derby County striker Paul Goddard.

29 December 1989 – Liverpool chairman John Smith receives a knighthood. Trevor Francis is offered a playing contract with Luton Town.

30 December 1989 - The last matches of the 1980s are played. 20-year-old striker Mark Robins scores his first goal for Manchester United in a 2–2 draw at Wimbledon, which rescues a point for Alex Ferguson's team but extend their winless run to six matches. Liverpool beat Charlton Athletic 1–0 at Anfield to boost their chances of reclaiming the league title from Arsenal, who are leapfrogged into second place by Aston Villa after a 2–1 defeat at Villa Park. There is a six-goal thriller in a Second Division clash at Boundary Park, where Oldham Athletic and Portsmouth draw 3–3.

31 December 1989 – The year and the decade ends with Liverpool as First Division leaders by four points from Aston Villa. Arsenal are a point further adrift. Charlton Athletic prop up the table, behind Luton Town and Sheffield Wednesday, while out–of–form Millwall are outside the relegation zone only on goal difference. Leeds United are top of the Second Division with Sheffield United in second place. Sunderland, Oldham Athletic, Ipswich Town and Newcastle United occupy the play-off zone, while West Ham United's early challenge has fallen away and they now stand 11th in their first season outside the top flight for almost a decade.

1 January 1990 - The new decade begins with Arsenal beating Crystal Palace 4–1 at Highbury to cut Liverpool's lead at the top of the First Division, as Kenny Dalglish's men are held 2–2 at the City Ground by Nottingham Forest. Title challenge outsiders Southampton win 4–2 at bottom club Charlton Athletic. In the Second Division, Steve Bull scores four goals as Wolverhampton Wanderers win 4–1 at Newcastle United, a result which boosts his side's challenge for a unique third successive promotion, and also drags promotion favourites Newcastle out of the top six. West Ham United maintain their hopes of an immediate return to the First Division by beating Barnsley 4–2 at Upton Park.

3 January 1990 – Ray Harford resigns after two and a half years as manager of Luton Town to be succeeded by his assistant Jimmy Ryan.

5 January 1990 – Swindon Town chairman Brian Hillier and former manager Lou Macari are suspected of making an illegal bet against their own club in an FA Cup tie with Newcastle United in January 1988.

6 January 1990 – Third Division Northampton Town cause the shock of the FA Cup third round by beating the 1987 winners Coventry City 1–0. Liverpool are held 0–0 by Swansea City.

7 January 1990 – Manchester United beat Nottingham Forest 1–0 at the City Ground in the third round of the FA Cup, with Mark Robins scoring the winning goal. The football press had widely tipped manager Alex Ferguson to be sacked if United had been beaten.

9 January 1990 – Liverpool thrash Swansea City 8–0 in their FA Cup third round replay. Second Division leaders Leeds United pay Nottingham Forest £400,000 for striker Lee Chapman.

13 January 1990 - Manchester United's winless run in the First Division stretches to eight matches when they lose 2–1 at home to Derby County.

17 January 1990 – Derby County replace Paul Goddard with Mick Harford in a £500,000 move from Luton Town.

19 January 1990 – Arsenal sign defender Colin Pates from Brighton & Hove Albion for £500,000.

21 January 1990 – Manchester United are now without a win from their last nine matches in the First Division with a 2–0 defeat at Norwich City, which leaves them just one point and one place above the relegation zone.

22 January 1990 – Almost two months after being sacked as player–manager by Queens Park Rangers, Trevor Francis signs for Sheffield Wednesday.

27 January 1990 – Chelsea are beaten 3–1 by Bristol City in the FA Cup fourth round. West Bromwich Albion beat First Division opposition for the second round running, winning 1–0 against Charlton Athletic. Aston Villa remain in contention for the double by beating Port Vale 6–0 at Villa Park. Crystal Palace beat Huddersfield Town 4–0.

28 January 1990 - A Clayton Blackmore goal gives Manchester United a 1–0 win their FA Cup fourth round tie with Hereford at Edgar Street. Norwich hold Liverpool to a goalless draw at Carrow Road and Everton beat Sheffield Wednesday 2–1 at Hillsborough.

29 January 1990 – The Taylor Report, an inquiry into stadium safety following the Hillsborough disaster nine months ago, recommends that all First and Second Division stadiums are all–seater by 1994 and that the Third and Fourth Divisions follow suit by 1999. Coventry City pay a club record £900,000 for 23–year–old Dundee United and Scotland striker Kevin Gallacher.

30 January 1990 – In their FA Cup fourth round replay at the Abbey Stadium, Fourth Division Cambridge United spring a major surprise by beating First Division Millwall 1–0.

31 January 1990 – Queens Park Rangers beat Arsenal 2–0 in an FA Cup fourth round replay. Liverpool end January as First Division leaders on goal difference ahead of Aston Villa, who have a game in hand. Manchester United are still just one place above the relegation zone, occupied by Charlton Athletic, Luton Town and Millwall. The race to get into the First Division is headed by Leeds United and Sheffield United, who are further distancing themselves from the rest of the Second Division. Just two points separate the next five clubs – Swindon Town, Oldham Athletic, Sunderland, Newcastle United and Ipswich Town. Meanwhile, eighth placed Wolverhampton Wanderers are just two points short of the playoff zone and are looking like reasonable challengers for a unique third successive promotion.

2 February 1990 – Former Liverpool manager Don Welsh dies aged 78.

3 February 1990 - The Manchester derby at Old Trafford ends in a 1–1 draw at Old Trafford. Manchester United have now gone 11 league games without a win, and are now 17th in the First Division and just one point above the relegation zone. They would have fallen into the bottom three today had Millwall managed to find a winner at Hillsborough, where they were held to a 1–1 draw by Sheffield Wednesday.

4 February 1990 - Gary Lineker scores a hat-trick in Tottenham's 4–0 home win over Norwich in the First Division.

8 February 1990 – West Ham United sign Czech goalkeeper Ludek Miklosko from Baník Ostrava for £300,000. Miklosko, 28, has been capped 31 times by the Czech national side.

10 February 1990 – Manchester United end their 11–match winless league run with a 2–1 away win over Millwall, who led the league five months ago but have now slipped into the relegation zone. Liverpool are held to their second goalless draw in two weeks by Norwich at Carrow Road. Aston Villa boost their title push with a 1–0 home win over Sheffield Wednesday. In the Second Division, leaders Leeds beat Hull 4–3 at Elland Road.

11 February 1990 - Nottingham Forest move closer to a joint record fourth League Cup triumph by beating Coventry 2–1 in the semi-final first leg at the City Ground.

12 February 1990 – Brian Hillier and Lou Macari are both fined after being found guilty of placing an illegal bet against Swindon Town. Hillier is also given a 6–month ban from football and is forced to resign as the club's chairman.

13 February 1990 – Millwall, still battling relegation despite having led the First Division five months ago, sack manager John Docherty and his assistant Frank McLintock.

14 February 1990 – Oldham Athletic defeat West Ham United 6–0 at Boundary Park in the first leg of their League Cup semi–final, all but guaranteeing their first ever Wembley appearance.

16 February 1990 – Striker Tony Cascarino pledges his future to relegation threatened Millwall despite reports that he is to join Aston Villa or Manchester United.

18 February 1990 – Lou Macari resigns after seven months as manager of West Ham United. Manchester United reach the FA Cup quarter finals with a 3–2 fifth round win at Newcastle United.

21 February 1990 – Aston Villa move to the top of the First Division with a 2–0 away win over Tottenham Hotspur.

23 February 1990 – West Ham United appoint their former player Billy Bonds as manager.

24 February 1990 - First Division leaders Aston Villa lose 3–0 at home to Wimbledon.

25 February 1990 – Nottingham Forest reach the League Cup final for the second season running by completing a 2–1 aggregate semi–final victory over Coventry City.

27 February 1990 – Fourth Division Cambridge United reach the FA Cup quarter–finals after a 5–1 second replay victory against Bristol City.

28 February 1990 – Aston Villa finish February as First Division leaders by two points from Liverpool in only their second season following promotion. Charlton Athletic, Millwall and Luton Town occupy the bottom three places, with the two Manchester clubs directly above them. Leeds United and Sheffield United continue to lead the way in the Second Division. Swindon Town, Oldham Athletic, Sunderland and Blackburn Rovers occupy the playoff zone, while Port Vale are emerging as surprise contenders for a playoff place that could be their key to First Division football for the first time in their history.

3 March 1990 - Liverpool return to the top of the First Division with a 1–0 home win over Millwall. Manchester United win at Old Trafford for the first time in four months, beating Luton Town 4–1.

4 March 1990 - Aston Villa miss the chance to return to the summit of the league, losing 2–0 at local rivals Coventry.

7 March 1990 - Oldham reach their first Wembley final despite losing their League Cup semi-final second leg 3–0 at West Ham. Arsenal keep their title hopes alive with a 3–0 home win over Nottingham Forest, and Luton climb out of the bottom three with a 3–2 home win over Coventry.

9 March 1990 – Middlesbrough sack manager Bruce Rioch after four years in charge. Rioch is replaced by his assistant Colin Todd.

10 March 1990 – Second Division Oldham Athletic reach the FA Cup quarter–finals after defeating Everton 2–1 after extra time in their fifth round second replay. Cambridge United's cup run is ended by Crystal Palace in the sixth round. There is no shortage of league action grabbing the headlines, including a 4–2 win for Coventry away to Nottingham Forest, which lifts the visitors into sixth place. Arsenal's title hopes are dented when they are held to a 1–1 draw by Manchester City at Maine Road. Aston Villa return to the top of the table with a 2–0 home win over Luton.

11 March 1990 – Manchester United achieve a 1–0 FA Cup quarter–final win over Sheffield United at Bramall Lane.

12 March 1990 – Bristol City striker Dean Horrix, 28, is killed in a car crash a week after joining the club from Millwall.

14 March 1990 – First Division leaders Aston Villa suffer a shock 3–0 defeat at Oldham Athletic in the FA Cup quarter–finals, while Liverpool's double bid remains on course after a 1–0 replay win over Queens Park Rangers. Nottingham Forest build for the future with an £80,000 move for Runcorn's 22–year–old Northern Irish winger Ian Woan.

15 March 1990 – Manchester City sign striker Niall Quinn from Arsenal for £700,000.

17 March 1990 - Aston Villa remain top of the table with a 1–0 win at Derby, extending their lead over Liverpool to five points, although the Reds have two games in hand.

18 March 1990 - Liverpool cut the gap at the top of the First Division to two points, and still have a game in hand, after beating Manchester United 2–1 at Old Trafford.

20 March 1990 – Chester City are taken over by Edinburgh based construction firm Morrison Construction in a deal which will see them leave Sealand Road at the end of this season and move to a new stadium in 1992.

25 March 1990 – Chelsea win the Full Members' Cup with a 1–0 win over Middlesbrough in the Wembley final. Having already won the cup in 1986, they are the first team to win it twice.

28 March 1990 – England beat Brazil 1–0 at Wembley with a goal from Gary Lineker.

31 March 1990 – Liverpool return to the top of the First Division at the end of the month, leading the table on goal difference with a game in hand ahead of Aston Villa. Millwall are eight points from safety at the bottom, and are joined in the relegation zone by Charlton Athletic and Manchester City. Leeds United and Sheffield United continue to lead the Second Division, with Wolverhampton Wanderers having leapfrogged Sunderland into the playoff zone where they join Swindon Town, Newcastle United and Blackburn Rovers.

1 April 1990 – Millwall's six–week hunt for a new manager ends when they appoint Bruce Rioch.

3 April 1990 - Liverpool return to the top of the First Division with a 2–1 win over Wimbledon at Anfield.

8 April 1990 – Liverpool's hopes of a unique second double are ended when they lose 4–3 after extra time to Crystal Palace in the semi–finals of the FA Cup at Villa Park. Manchester United draw 3–3 with Oldham Athletic in the other semi–final at Maine Road.

11 April 1990 – Manchester United beat Oldham Athletic 2–1 after extra time in the FA Cup semi–final replay. The game is however marred by controversy after referee Joe Worrall fails to award Oldham an early goal after Nick Henry's shot clearly crosses the line. In the league, Liverpool move closer to their 18th league title with a 4–0 away win over struggling Charlton Athletic, in which on–loan striker Ronny Rosenthal scores a hat–trick. Aston Villa keep up their challenge by winning 1–0 away to Arsenal.

14 April 1990 – Millwall are relegated to the Second Division after losing 2–0 at Derby County. Charlton's 3–2 defeat at Southampton leaves them needing to win their four remaining games to stand any chance of avoiding relegation. Liverpool remain top of the table but drop two points when they are held to a 2–2 draw by Nottingham Forest at Anfield.

16 April 1990 - Luton are left needing at least six points from their final three games to avoid relegation after losing 3–0 at Nottingham Forest. Manchester City's survival is confirmed with a 1–0 win at Norwich. There is major drama in the Second Division promotion race, when leaders Leeds beat Sheffield United 4–0 at Elland Road, sending the visitors into third place, as Newcastle move into second place with a 3–0 home win over Stoke, which sends the visitors down to the Third Division.

17 April 1990 – 20–year–old striker Mark Robins scores twice in Manchester United's 2–0 home league win over Aston Villa – a result which puts the opposition's title hopes into serious doubt. Charlton Athletic lose 2–1 at home to Wimbledon and are relegated.

21 April 1990 - Liverpool take another step towards the title with a 4–1 home win over Chelsea. Aston Villa keep their hopes alive with a 1–0 home win over Millwall. Luton keep their survival bid alive with a 2–0 home win over Arsenal, while Sheffield Wednesday are still in danger of going down with a 1–0 defeat to QPR at Loftus Road.

28 April 1990 – Liverpool seal their 18th top division title with a 2–1 home win over Queens Park Rangers as Aston Villa draw 3–3 at home to Norwich City. The battle to avoid the last relegation place in the First Division will go right to the wire, with Luton and Sheffield Wednesday both winning their penultimate First Division games. The Second Division promotion race will also go right down to the wire. Newcastle's 2–1 home win over West Ham keeps them in the hunt for automatic promotion, while leaving the visiting side's playoff hopes hanging by a thread. Leeds remain top of the table but second placed Sheffield United will go up and move into pole position if they win their game in hand. Chester City play the final Football League game at their Sealand Road home of 84 years – a 2–0 win over Rotherham United.

29 April 1990 – Nottingham Forest retain the League Cup with a 1–0 win over Oldham Athletic in the final. Nigel Jemson scores the only goal of the game. Colchester United are relegated to the GM Vauxhall Conference after 40 years in the Football League, their demotion from the Fourth Division being confirmed by a 4–0 defeat to Cambridge United at the Abbey Stadium, a result which keeps the home side's playoff hopes alive.

30 April 1990 – The month ends with Liverpool confirmed as First Division champions, and Aston Villa sure of second place. Luton Town trail Sheffield Wednesday by three points with one game remaining in the fight to avoid the last relegation place. The Second Division promotion race is still wide open. Leeds United (top), Sheffield United (second) and Newcastle United (third) are fighting it out for automatic promotion. Swindon Town, Blackburn Rovers and Sunderland complete the top six, but West Ham United, Wolverhampton Wanderers, Ipswich Town and Oldham Athletic still have a mathematical chance of breaking into the playoffs.

1 May 1990 – Kenny Dalglish makes his final appearance for Liverpool at the age of 39, in their 1–0 home league win over Derby County. The only goal of the game comes from Gary Gillespie. Sheffield United miss the chance to seal promotion to the First Division, being held to a goalless draw by Blackburn at Ewood Park.

5 May 1990 – Sheffield Wednesday are relegated on goal difference behind Luton Town, who win their final game of the season 3–2 at Derby County while the Hillsborough club lose 3–0 at home to Nottingham Forest. Liverpool's season ends in style with a 6–1 away win over Coventry City, and Tottenham Hotspur pip Arsenal to third place by one point. Sheffield United seal promotion back to the First Division after 14 years away. Dave Bassett achieves the sixth promotion of his career with a Blades side who finished level on points with champions Leeds United. Leeds United's promotion celebrations are marred when their fans riot in Bournemouth in the aftermath of the promotion clinching game against AFC Bournemouth, who were relegated by the result.

12 May 1990 – Manchester United and Crystal Palace draw 3–3 in the FA Cup final, forcing a replay. Mark Hughes is on the scoresheet twice for United and Bryan Robson once. Substitute Ian Wright scores two of Palace's goals, the other goal coming from Gary O'Reilly.

17 May 1990 – A Lee Martin goal gives Manchester United the FA Cup in a 1–0 replay victory over Crystal Palace.

18 May 1990 – David Seaman becomes Britain's most expensive goalkeeper when he agrees to join Arsenal in a £1.3 million move from Queens Park Rangers.

21 May 1990 – 34 Bolton Wanderers hooligans who were convicted of taking part in attacks on police officers and rival supporters are banned from travelling to Italy for the duration of the World Cup by the Italian government.

19 May 1990 – Chelsea sign Irish midfielder Andy Townsend from Norwich City for £1.5 million.

24 May 1990 – Bobby Robson announces that he will step down as England manager after the World Cup to take over as manager of Dutch side PSV Eindhoven.

28 May 1990 – Swindon Town win the Second Division playoff final by beating Sunderland 1–0, but their place in the First Division remains in doubt over the alleged tax scandal, over which Colin Calderwood has now been cleared but Lou Macari, Brian Hillier and Vince Farrar have been charged.

31 May 1990 – Aston Villa chairman Doug Ellis gives the Football Association permission to interview manager Graham Taylor for the England manager's job. Other names linked to the vacancy included Howard Wilkinson of Leeds United, Terry Venables of Tottenham Hotspur, Howard Kendall of Manchester City and the surprise candidate Joe Royle of Oldham Athletic, who has yet to manage in the top division.

2 June 1990 – England struggle to a 1–1 draw against Tunisia in Tunis in their final World Cup warm–up match.

5 June 1990 – Leeds United prepare for their First Division comeback with a £1million move for Gary McAllister of Leicester City. Three England fans receive 20–day prison sentences imposed by a court in Sardinia after being found guilty of theft and criminal damage.

6 June 1990 – Manchester United pay Oldham Athletic £625,000 for Irish full–back Denis Irwin.

7 June 1990 – Swindon Town are found guilty on 34 charges of financial irregularities at a Football League hearing. They are relegated to the Third Division as a punishment. Wimbledon pay Maidstone United £300,000 for defender Warren Barton.

11 June 1990 – England open their World Cup campaign with a 1–1 draw against Republic of Ireland.

12 June 1990 – Nottingham Forest sign midfielder Roy Keane (19 in August) from Irish club Cobh Ramblers for £10,000.

14 June 1990 – Leeds United prepare for their return to the First Division by signing Arsenal goalkeeper John Lukic for £1 million.

16 June 1990 – England draw 0–0 with the Netherlands in their second World Cup group game, leaving them needing to win the final group game against Egypt in five days to reach the Second Round.

21 June 1990 – England clinch qualification for the World Cup Second Round by beating Egypt 1–0 in their final group game.

26 June 1990 – England reach the quarter–finals of the World Cup with a second round 1–0 victory over Belgium.

29 June 1990 – Liverpool complete the permanent transfer of Israeli striker Ronnie Rosenthal from Standard Liège for £1 million.

== FA Cup ==
Alex Ferguson silenced the critics who attacked him for a lack of progress in the league by guiding Manchester United to a 1–0 replay victory over Crystal Palace in the FA Cup final, which was achieved after a 3–3 draw. The pivotal game in his side's season had been in the televised third round tie at Nottingham Forest, when a Mark Robins goal gave relegation-threatened United a surprise win and triggered improved times for the club. They won the FA Cup despite not playing a home game along the way, giving Ferguson his first major trophy as United's manager.

The season produced a memorable combination of FA Cup semi-finals, as Crystal Palace surprisingly beat Liverpool 4–3 just a couple of hours before Manchester United and Oldham Athletic fought out a 3–3 draw, with United going on to win the replay 2–1.

== Football League Cup ==
Brian Clough's Nottingham Forest retained their League Cup by beating Oldham Athletic 1–0 at Wembley.

== Football League ==
=== First Division ===
Liverpool secured their 18th First Division title, finishing nine points ahead of Aston Villa. Tottenham Hotspur, defending champions Arsenal and newly promoted Chelsea completed the top five.

Nottingham Forest retained the Football League Cup to match the record of four wins in the competition set by Liverpool, while Manchester United, despite experiencing their worst league campaign since returning to the top-flight in 1975, finally won some silverware at the fourth attempt under Alex Ferguson by lifting the FA Cup to match the record of seven wins in the competition set by Aston Villa and Tottenham Hotspur.

Millwall, who had briefly topped the First Division in September, ended the season relegated in bottom place with a mere five wins to their name all season. Charlton Athletic's luck finally ran out after four seasons as they became the next team to go down. The last relegation place went to Sheffield Wednesday, who went down on goal difference after a late escape act by Luton Town.

Pos	Team	Pld	W	D	L	GF	GA	GD	Pts	Qualification or relegation
1	Liverpool (C)	38	23	10	5	78	37	+41	79	Disqualified from the European Cup (Note: Liverpool were banned by UEFA from its competitions from the season 1985–86 on for 10 years, because of the Heysel Stadium disaster in 1985, involving Liverpool fans. The ban was eventually lifted for the 1991–92 season.)
2	Aston Villa	38	21	7	10	57	38	+19	70	Qualification for the UEFA Cup first round
3	Tottenham Hotspur	38	19	6	13	59	47	+12	63	
4	Arsenal	38	18	8	12	54	38	+16	62	
5	Chelsea	38	16	12	10	58	50	+8	60	
6	Everton	38	17	8	13	57	46	+11	59	
7	Southampton	38	15	10	13	71	63	+8	55	
8	Wimbledon	38	13	16	9	47	40	+7	55	
9	Nottingham Forest	38	15	9	14	55	47	+8	54	
10	Norwich City	38	13	14	11	44	42	+2	53	
11	Queens Park Rangers	38	13	11	14	45	44	+1	50	
12	Coventry City	38	14	7	17	39	59	−20	49	
13	Manchester United	38	13	9	16	46	47	−1	48	Qualification for the European Cup Winners' Cup first round (Note: Manchester United qualified for the UEFA Cup Winners' Cup as the 1989–90 FA Cup winners.)
14	Manchester City	38	12	12	14	43	52	−9	48	
15	Crystal Palace	38	13	9	16	42	66	−24	48	
16	Derby County	38	13	7	18	43	40	+3	46	
17	Luton Town	38	10	13	15	43	57	−14	43	
18	Sheffield Wednesday (R)	38	11	10	17	35	51	−16	43	Relegation to the Second Division
19	Charlton Athletic (R)	38	7	9	22	31	57	−26	30	Relegation to the Second Division
20	Millwall (R)	38	5	11	22	39	65	−26	26	Relegation to the Second Division

Source: World Football
Rules for classification: 1) Points; 2) Goal difference; 3) Goals scored
(C) Champions; (R) Relegated

=== Second Division ===
Leeds United finally made it back to the First Division after eight years away by winning the Second Division title. They were joined by Sheffield United, who won a second successive promotion under manager Dave Bassett, who won his sixth promotion in 10 seasons. Swindon Town did beat Sunderland in the playoff final, but their opponents were then promoted instead after Swindon admitted to 36 charges of financial irregularities.

Stoke City's decline continued as they fell into the Third Division, along with a Bradford City side who had almost won promotion to the First Division two years earlier, while AFC Bournemouth's late season slump cost them their Second Division status and helped save Middlesbrough from a second successive relegation, as well as keeping West Bromwich clear of Third Division football for the first time.

Pos	Team	Pld	W	D	L	GF	GA	GD	Pts	Qualification or relegation
1	Leeds United (C, P)	46	24	13	9	79	52	+27	85	Promotion to the First Division
2	Sheffield United (P)	46	24	13	9	78	58	+20	85	Promotion to the First Division
3	Newcastle United	46	22	14	10	80	55	+25	80	Qualification for the Second Division play-offs
4	Swindon Town (Note: Swindon Town were disqualified from promotion after being found guilty of making illegal payments, and the play-off runners-up Sunderland were promoted in their place.) (O)	46	20	14	12	79	59	+20	74	Qualification for the Second Division play-offs
5	Blackburn Rovers	46	19	17	10	74	59	+15	74	Qualification for the Second Division play-offs
6	Sunderland (P)	46	20	14	12	70	64	+6	74	Qualification for the Second Division play-offs
7	West Ham United	46	20	12	14	80	57	+23	72	
8	Oldham Athletic	46	19	14	13	70	57	+13	71	
9	Ipswich Town	46	19	12	15	67	66	+1	69	
10	Wolverhampton Wanderers	46	18	13	15	67	60	+7	67	
11	Port Vale	46	15	16	15	62	57	+5	61	
12	Portsmouth	46	15	16	15	62	65	−3	61	
13	Leicester City	46	15	14	17	67	79	−12	59	
14	Hull City	46	14	16	16	58	65	−7	58	
15	Watford	46	14	15	17	58	60	−2	57	
16	Plymouth Argyle	46	14	13	19	58	63	−5	55	
17	Oxford United	46	15	9	22	57	66	−9	54	
18	Brighton & Hove Albion	46	15	9	22	56	72	−16	54	
19	Barnsley	46	13	15	18	49	71	−22	54	
20	West Bromwich Albion	46	12	15	19	67	71	−4	51	
21	Middlesbrough	46	13	11	22	52	63	−11	50	
22	Bournemouth (R)	46	12	12	22	57	76	−19	48	Relegation to the Third Division
23	Bradford City (R)	46	9	14	23	44	68	−24	41	Relegation to the Third Division
24	Stoke City (R)	46	6	19	21	35	63	−28	37	Relegation to the Third Division

Source: Statto
Rules for classification: 1) Points; 2) Goal difference; 3) Goals scored
(C) Champions; (O) Play-off winners; (P) Promoted; (R) Relegated

=== Second Division play-offs ===
Semifinals; 1st leg – 13 May; 2nd leg – 16 May 1990
3rd	Newcastle United	0	0	0
6th	Sunderland	0	2	2
4th	Swindon Town	2	2	4
5th	Blackburn Rovers	1	1	2

Final at Wembley; 28 May 1990
6th	Sunderland (Note: Following successful prosecutions against Swindon Town and the club chairman, Brian Hillier, after they admitted 36 breaches of League rules — 35 of which are related to illegal payments, Swindon remained in the Second Division and Sunderland took their promotion place (see History of Swindon Town F.C.).)	0
4th	Swindon Town	1

=== Third Division ===
Former England international Gerry Francis guided Bristol Rovers into the Second Division at the third attempt as they won the Third Division title, with local rivals Bristol City joining them as runners-up, and Neil Warnock's Notts County triumphing in the playoffs.

Walsall, Blackpool, Northampton Town and Cardiff City were all relegated to the Fourth Division.

Pos	Team	Pld	W	D	L	GF	GA	GD	Pts	Promotion or relegation
1	Bristol Rovers (C, P)	46	26	15	5	71	35	+36	93	Promotion to the Second Division
2	Bristol City (P)	46	27	10	9	76	40	+36	91	Promotion to the Second Division
3	Notts County (O, P)	46	25	12	9	73	53	+20	87	Qualification for the Third Division play-offs
4	Tranmere Rovers	46	23	11	12	86	49	+37	80	Qualification for the Third Division play-offs
5	Bury	46	21	11	14	70	49	+21	74	Qualification for the Third Division play-offs
6	Bolton Wanderers	46	18	15	13	59	48	+11	69	Qualification for the Third Division play-offs
7	Birmingham City	46	18	12	16	60	59	+1	66	
8	Huddersfield Town	46	17	14	15	61	62	−1	65	
9	Rotherham United	46	17	13	16	71	62	+9	64	
10	Reading	46	15	19	12	57	53	+4	64	
11	Shrewsbury Town	46	16	15	15	59	54	+5	63	
12	Crewe Alexandra	46	15	17	14	56	53	+3	62	
13	Brentford	46	18	7	21	66	66	0	61	
14	Leyton Orient	46	16	10	20	52	56	−4	58	
15	Mansfield Town	46	16	7	23	50	65	−15	55	
16	Chester City	46	13	15	18	43	55	−12	54	
17	Swansea City	46	14	12	20	45	63	−18	54	
18	Wigan Athletic	46	13	14	19	48	64	−16	53	
19	Preston North End	46	14	10	22	65	79	−14	52	
20	Fulham	46	12	15	19	55	66	−11	51	
21	Cardiff City (R)	46	12	14	20	51	70	−19	50	Relegation to the Fourth Division
22	Northampton Town (R)	46	11	14	21	51	68	−17	47	Relegation to the Fourth Division
23	Blackpool (R)	46	10	16	20	49	73	−24	46	Relegation to the Fourth Division
24	Walsall (R)	46	9	14	23	40	72	−32	41	Relegation to the Fourth Division

(C) Champions; (O) Play-off winners; (P) Promoted; (R) Relegated

=== Third Division play-offs ===
Semifinals; 1st leg – 13 May; 2nd leg – 16 May 1990
3rd	Notts County	1	2	3
6th	Bolton Wanderers	1	0	1
4th	Tranmere Rovers	0	2	2
5th	Bury	0	0	0

Final at Wembley; 27 May 1990
3rd	Notts County	2
4th	Tranmere Rovers	0

=== Fourth Division ===
Exeter City were promoted as Fourth Division champions, joined in the automatic promotion places by Southend United and a rejuvenated Grimsby Town who were on the comeback trail from near closure two years earlier. New manager John Beck kicked off his managerial career with playoff glory at Cambridge United. Maidstone United, making their debut in the Football League, reached the promotion play-offs but lost in the semi-final. Colchester United's 40-year stay in the Football League ended in relegation.

Pos	Team	Pld	W	D	L	GF	GA	GD	Pts	Promotion or relegation
1	Exeter City (C, P)	46	28	5	13	83	48	+35	89	Promotion to the Third Division
2	Grimsby Town (P)	46	22	13	11	70	47	+23	79	Promotion to the Third Division
3	Southend United (P)	46	22	9	15	61	48	+13	75	Promotion to the Third Division
4	Stockport County	46	21	11	14	68	62	+6	74	Qualification for the Fourth Division play-offs
5	Maidstone United	46	22	7	17	77	61	+16	73	Qualification for the Fourth Division play-offs
6	Cambridge United (O, P)	46	21	10	15	76	66	+10	73	Qualification for the Fourth Division play-offs
7	Chesterfield	46	19	14	13	63	50	+13	71	Qualification for the Fourth Division play-offs
8	Carlisle United	46	21	8	17	61	60	+1	71	
9	Peterborough United	46	17	17	12	59	46	+13	68	
10	Lincoln City	46	18	14	14	48	48	0	68	
11	Scunthorpe United	46	17	15	14	69	54	+15	66	
12	Rochdale	46	20	6	20	52	55	−3	66	
13	York City	46	16	16	14	55	53	+2	64	
14	Gillingham	46	17	11	18	46	48	−2	62	
15	Torquay United	46	15	12	19	53	66	−13	57	
16	Burnley	46	14	14	18	45	55	−10	56	
17	Hereford United	46	15	10	21	56	62	−6	55	
18	Scarborough	46	15	10	21	60	73	−13	55	
19	Hartlepool United	46	15	10	21	66	88	−22	55	
20	Doncaster Rovers	46	14	9	23	53	60	−7	51	
21	Wrexham	46	13	12	21	51	67	−16	51	Qualification for the European Cup Winners' Cup first round (Note: Wrexham were runners-up in the Welsh Cup final, and since winners Hereford United are an English club, Wrexham were awarded the right to participate in the Cup Winners' Cup.)
22	Aldershot	46	12	14	20	49	69	−20	50	
23	Halifax Town	46	12	13	21	57	65	−8	49	
24	Colchester United (R)	46	11	10	25	48	75	−27	43	Relegation to the Football Conference

(C) Champions; (O) Play-off winners; (P) Promoted; (R) Relegated

=== Fourth Division play-offs ===
Semifinals; 1st leg –13 May; 2nd leg –16 May 1990
4th	Stockport County	0	0	0
7th	Chesterfield	4	2	6
5th	Maidstone United (1897)	1	0	1
6th	Cambridge United	1	2	3

Final at Wembley; 26 May 1990
7th	Chesterfield	0
6th	Cambridge United	1

=== Top goalscorers ===
First Division

- Gary Lineker (Tottenham Hotspur) – 24 goals

Second Division

- Micky Quinn (Newcastle United) – 32 goals

Third Division

- Bob Taylor (Bristol City) – 27 goals

Fourth Division

- Brett Angell (Stockport County) – 23 goals

== Non-league football ==
The divisional champions of the major non-League competitions were:

Competition	Winners
Football Conference	Darlington
Isthmian League	Slough Town
Northern Premier League	Colne Dynamoes
Southern League	Dover Athletic
FA Trophy	Barrow
FA Vase	Yeading

== Successful players ==
- David Platt's frequent goalscoring from the Aston Villa midfield was not quite enough to earn his side the championship trophy, but it was enough for him to win the PFA Players' Player of the Year award.
- Liverpool's John Barnes scored over 20 goals and helped his team win another league title and himself win the FWA Footballer of the Year award.
- Southampton's Guernsey-born striker Matthew Le Tissier was credited with the PFA Young Player of the Year award for his exciting performances.
- Manchester United's Mark Hughes had another good season as he helped his side overcome disappointing league form and reach the FA Cup final where he scored twice in the first game before they won the replay.
- Oldham's Andy Ritchie scored 28 goals in all competitions as his side reached the F.A. Cup semi-final and League Cup final. His teammate Frankie Bunn scored six times in his side's League Cup win over Scarborough.
- Newcastle striker Mick Quinn scored 32 times in the league and 36 in all competitions, but couldn't quite earn his side promotion to the First Division.
- Promising Sheffield Wednesday striker Dalian Atkinson emerged as a competent goalscorer, but his side's relegation to the Second Division saw him wanting top-flight football, which he got in the form of a transfer to Spanish side Real Sociedad.
- Wolves striker Steve Bull had another excellent season, highlighted by scoring four goals against Newcastle in the Second Division on New Year's Day and being the only Second Division player to feature in England's World Cup squad.

== Successful managers ==
- Kenny Dalglish brought another championship trophy to Liverpool after fighting off a late challenge from Aston Villa.
- Alex Ferguson finally guided Manchester United to a major trophy after four seasons of trying when they beat Crystal Palace in the FA Cup final replay.
- Graham Taylor took Aston Villa to the brink of championship glory just one season after they had been on the brink of relegation.
- Steve Coppell took Crystal Palace to their first ever FA Cup final, losing to Manchester United in a replay after beating League Champions Liverpool in the semi-final.
- Dave Bassett took Sheffield United to a second successive promotion to bring top-flight football to Bramall Lane for the first time since the 1970s.
- Howard Wilkinson led Leeds United back into the First Division after an eight-year exile.
- Bobby Campbell guided newly promoted Chelsea to fifth place in the First Division.
- Gerry Francis took Bristol Rovers to the Third Division championship.
- Neil Warnock ended Notts County's five-year spell in the Third Division by guiding them to success in the promotion playoffs.
- Alan Buckley rejuvenated Grimsby Town by guiding them to promotion success in the Fourth Division.
- Brian Little took Darlington back into the Football League at the first attempt by guiding them to the Football Conference title.
- Joe Royle guided Oldham to the League Cup final (their first ever Wembley appearance) and the F.A. Cup semi-final (their first appearance at that stage of the competition since 1913.
- Denis Smith took Sunderland back to the top flight only 3 seasons after they had been relegated into the third tier for the first time in their history.

== Famous debutants ==
- 19 August 1989: Trevor Sinclair, 16-year-old winger, makes his debut for Blackpool in their opening game of the Third Division campaign – a goalless draw at home to Wigan Athletic.
- 24 March 1990: Dwight Yorke, 18-year-old Trinidadian and Tobagonian striker, made his debut as a substitute for Aston Villa away to Crystal Palace in a 1-0 defeat at Selhurst Park
- 16 April 1990: Graham Stuart, 19-year-old forward, made his debut and scored for Chelsea at home to Crystal Palace in a 3-0 win at Stamford Bridge
- 30 April 1990: Mark Bosnich, 18-year-old Australian goalkeeper, keeps a clean sheet on his debut for Manchester United at home to Wimbledon in a First Division goalless draw.

== Retirements ==
- 1 May 1990: Kenny Dalglish, 39-year-old Liverpool player-manager, plays his last game for the club in their 1–0 home win over Derby County.

== Deaths ==
- 15 July 1989 – Laurie Cunningham, 33, former England midfielder, was killed in a car crash in Spain. He played as a substitute for Wimbledon when they won the FA Cup in 1988. He also played for clubs including Leyton Orient, West Bromwich Albion, Real Madrid and Leicester City, and had a loan spell at Manchester United during the 1982–83 season.
- 26 July 1989 - Arthur Caldwell, 76, played 92 league games as a left-winger for Port Vale in the four years leading up to the outbreak of World War II. The war effectively ended his playing career after the age of 26.
- 1 September 1989 – Kazimierz Deyna, 41, former Polish international who had a spell with Manchester City in the late 1970s. Died in a car accident.
- 17 October 1989 - Derek Pace, 57, scored 196 Football League goals for four clubs between 1950 and 1966, including 40 goals for his first club Aston Villa and 140 for his second club Sheffield United.
- 27 October 1989 - Con Moulson, 83, former Irish national who played for Lincoln City and Notts County during the 1930s and 1940s, before managing Lincoln for a few months in 1965.
- 30 October 1989 - Frank Allen, 88, was an inside-forward during the interwar years for clubs including Barnsley, Southport and Barrow. He completed his career in France with Le Havre as one of the first British players to play for an overseas club side.
- 14 November 1989 – Jimmy Murphy, 79, assistant manager/chief coach at Manchester United during the reign of Matt Busby. Was also a long-time scout and reserve team manager for the club. Took temporary charge of the Manchester United first team during the five months following the Munich air disaster while Busby recovered from his injuries. Also managed the Welsh national side from 1956 to 1964, and during his playing days turned out for West Bromwich Albion and Swindon Town as a wing-half.
- 9 December - Basil Hayward, 61, played 349 league games as a centre-half, left-back and centre-forward for Port Vale between 1946 and 1958, scoring 55 goals, completing his league career at Portsmouth before spending four years at non-league Yeovil Town as player-manager. He managed Gillingham in the Football League from 1966 to 1971.
- 10 December 1989 -
  - - George Edmonds, 96, one of the oldest surviving Football League players and one of the last to have played before World War I, played at centre-forward for Wolverhampton Wanderers in the 1921 FA Cup Final and also scored 57 league goals during two spells at Watford.
  - - Frank Baker, 71, played 162 league games as an outside-left for Stoke City between 1936 and 1949.
  - - Sam Barkas, 79, was left-back in Manchester City's title-winning side of 1937 and was capped five times for England on top of his 176 league appearances for the Maine Road side and a further 202 for his first club Bradford City.
- 15 January 1990 - Oscar Fox, 69, played 44 league games at wing-half for Sheffield Wednesday in the four immediate postwar seasons before a more active seven-year spell at Mansfield Town, where he played 248 league games and scored 30 goals.
- 2 February 1990 - Don Welsh, 78, who managed Liverpool for five years during the 1950s. As a player he was capped three times by England in the late 1930s and also played 199 First Division matches as a forward for Charlton Athletic.
- 6 March 1990 - Albert Dunlop, 57, kept goal 231 times in the league for Everton between 1956 and 1963, winning the league title in his final season at the club.
- 11 March 1990 – Dean Horrix, 28, Bristol City striker, was killed in a car crash just over a week after he joined the club from Millwall.
- 12 April 1990 - Harry O'Grady, 83, made 99 Football League appearances for eight clubs as a forward between 1929 and 1938.
- 5 May 1990 - George Hannah, 61, played 372 league games as a forward for Newcastle United, Lincoln City, Manchester City, Notts County and Bradford City between 1949 and 1966.
- 7 May 1990 - Charlie Walker, 78, played 118 games as full-back for West Ham United during a career which was interrupted by World War II.
- 30 June 1990 – Brian Tiler, 47, who played for Aston Villa during the 1970s and was a director for AFC Bournemouth from the mid-1980s, was killed in a car crash in Italy. Bournemouth manager Harry Redknapp was travelling in the same car as Tiler but survived.
