= Andy Rhodes =

English footballer (born 1964)

Personal information
- Full name: Andrew Charles Rhodes
- Date of birth: 23 August 1964 (age 62)
- Place of birth: Doncaster, England
- Height: 6 ft 0 in (1.83 m)
- Position: Goalkeeper

Senior career*
Years	Team	Apps	(Gls)
1983–1985	Barnsley	36	(0)
1985–1988	Doncaster Rovers	106	(0)
1988–1990	Oldham Athletic	69	(0)
1990–1992	Dunfermline Athletic	79	(0)
1992–1995	St Johnstone	107	(0)
1995	→ Norwich City (loan)	0	(0)
1995	→ Bolton Wanderers (loan)	0	(0)
1995–1998	Airdrieonians	29	(0)
1997–1998	→ Scarborough (loan)	11	(0)
2004–2008	Ipswich Town	0	(0)
Total		437	(0)
- * Club domestic league appearances and goals

Andrew Charles Rhodes (born 23 August 1964) is an English former football goalkeeper and ex-assistant manager of Oldham Athletic.

Rhodes played for Oldham Athletic between 1988 and 1990, capping his time at Boundary Park with an appearance in the 1990 Football League Cup Final, which Oldham lost to Nottingham Forest. He later rejoined Oldham as goalkeeping coach.

In the summer of 1990 Rhodes started six years playing in the Scottish Premier League with Dunfermline Athletic and Perth side St Johnstone, and in 1995 had a brief stint on loan at Bolton Wanderers.

Rhodes was the goalkeeping coach at Ipswich Town from 2004 to May 2008. In October 2004, he became registered as an Ipswich Town player to cover for injuries. He remained a reserve keeper at Ipswich until 2008. Ipswich manager Jim Magilton praised his work with the club however after another failed promotion attempt he wanted to shake up his backroom staff. He was the last member of former Ipswich manager Joe Royle's backroom staff to leave the club.

After eight years as head of goalkeeping for Sheffield Wednesday, he left to become assistant manager at Oldham Athletic.

He is the father of Scotland international striker Jordan Rhodes.

== Honours ==
Oldham Athletic

- Football League Cup runner-up: 1989–90

Individual

- Barnsley Player of the Year: 1983–84
