= 1990 Football League Cup final =

English football match

- Event: 1989–90 Football League Cup
Nottingham Forest	Oldham Athletic
1	0
- Date: 29 April 1990
- Venue: Wembley Stadium, London
- Man of the Match: Des Walker (Nottingham Forest)
- Referee: John Martin
- Attendance: 74,343

The 1990 Football League Cup final took place at Wembley Stadium on 29 April 1990. It was the 30th League Cup final, and was contested between Nottingham Forest and Oldham Athletic. Nigel Jemson scored the only goal of the game, shooting low to the net after his initial shot had been saved.

As of 2026, this is the last time that Nottingham Forest won the League Cup and a major trophy in general.

== Match ==
=== Summary ===
Neither side entered the final in a good run of form. Nottingham Forest had only won one of their last 10, while Oldham - who had at one time been bidding for promotion to the Top Flight, and had gone all the way to the semi-finals in the FA Cup, before losing a replay against Manchester United - had won only four league matches since December. Forest were the cup holders and the favourites, but from the off Oldham showed far more attacking intent and nearly took the lead in the 1st minute when Neil Adams' cross into the box fooled the Forest keeper Sutton and nearly dipped under the bar. The 1st half fluctuated between excitement and tedium at times, but most attacking intent came from Second Division Oldham, who pressured the Forest back line and could consider themselves unlucky that their endeavour didn't result in a lead at half time. Andy Ritchie had a shot tipped over the bar, while Holden saw his shot from a corner blocked on the line. Forest, by comparison, created few openings, and seemed overwhelmed by the heat in what was a sweltering day. The few chances they did have included a corner where Hodge's header forced a save from the Latics keeper Rhodes in the 6th minute, and a shot by Parker in the 28th minute that saw Rhodes dive to his left to prevent a certain goal.

An exciting 2nd half saw Oldham continue their pressure as Forest struggled to get out of their own half. Frankie Bunn had a chance to put Oldham ahead when a looping ball was crossed in, but his shot skied well over. But from the resulting goal kick downfield Forest caught Oldham cold, with a flick on header falling to Nigel Clough who passed the ball to Jemson, who ran into the box and fired left of the Latics keeper Rhodes. Rhodes dived the wrong way to his right, but his feet blocked the ball, but Jemson was in to put away his effort at the 2nd time of asking and Nottingham Forest were 1-0 up with only 2 minutes of the 2nd half played. For the next 15 minutes Forest then dominated play as they attempted to extend their lead and put the game to bed. Parker had a great chance to score in the 50th min when running at goal from a misdirected Oldham clearance from a throw in, forcing Rhodes to handle outside his area. Jemson also had a chance to double his lead when he turned his marker Earl Barratt before running at goal, barging past Barlow and curling a shot to the keeper's right to force a save.

But as the game wore on, Oldham began to get a foothold in the game again and started to pressure Forest in search of an equaliser. Forest seemed to sit back to invite the Oldham pressure on in a bid to catch them out on the break and also to preserve energy in the stifling heat. In the 68th minute Roger Palmer came on for Frankie Bunn in an Oldham substitution and within 3 minutes he nearly equalised for them. A foul by Clough midway in the Forest half gave Oldham a free kick. Warhurst's floated cross into the box was flicked on by Ritchie and Palmer headed the ball loopingly towards the corner of the goal, only for Forest keeper Sutton to somehow claw the ball away from goal and from the approaching Adams at the far post. Oldham had more great chances to score as they turned the screw. Paul Warhurst shot just wide of the post, while Denis Irwin had a chance when Forest keeper Sutton spilled a catch from a cross but his shot was scuffed and the referee had blown for a foul on the keeper by Barratt. But the best chance for Oldham came in the 80th minute when they won a throw in. The ball went to Warhurst, who floated a ball into the Forest box to Nicky Henry, who had wandered unobserved by a number of Forest defenders to find himself unmarked in the box and with a chance to shoot at goal, only to miscontrol the ball and for it to fall to a grateful Stuart Pearce to play it back to his keeper. Towards the end of the game Forest were playing for time and keeping the ball in the corner, as the heat and the intensity of the Oldham pressure took their toll, but they held on to secure the cup and defend it, repeating their feat when they did so in 1978 and 1979.

=== Details ===
29 April 1990
15:00

Nottingham Forest	1–0	Oldham Athletic
Jemson 47'

Wembley Stadium, London
Attendance: 74,343
Referee: John Martin

Nottingham Forest	Oldham Athletic

GK	1	(England) Steve Sutton
RB	2	(England) Brian Laws
LB	3	(England) Stuart Pearce (c)
CB	4	(England) Des Walker
CB	5	(England) Steve Chettle
CM	6	(England) Steve Hodge
RM	7	(England) Gary Crosby
CM	8	(England) Garry Parker
CF	9	(England) Nigel Clough
CF	10	(England) Nigel Jemson
LM	11	(England) Franz Carr
Substitutes:
DF	12	(Scotland) Terry Wilson
MF	14	(Republic of Ireland) Tommy Gaynor
Manager:
(England) Brian Clough

GK	1	(England) Andy Rhodes
RB	2	(Republic of Ireland) Denis Irwin
LB	3	(England) Andy Barlow
CM	4	(England) Nick Henry
CB	5	(England) Earl Barrett
CB	6	(England) Paul Warhurst
RM	7	(England) Neil Adams
CF	8	(England) Andy Ritchie
CF	9	(England) Frankie Bunn	(substituted off) 68'
CM	10	(Republic of Ireland) Mike Milligan (c)
LM	11	(England) Rick Holden
Substitutes:
FW	12	(England) Roger Palmer	(substituted on) 68'
DF	14	(England) Gary Williams
Manager:
(England) Joe Royle

Man of the Match
Des Walker (Nottingham Forest)
