= Paul Bernard (footballer) =

Scottish footballer

Personal information
- Full name: Paul Robert Bernard
- Date of birth: 30 December 1972 (age 53)
- Place of birth: Edinburgh, Scotland
- Height: 5 ft 11 in (1.80 m)
- Position: Midfielder

Youth career
- ?–1991: Oldham Athletic

Senior career*
Years	Team	Apps	(Gls)
1991–1995	Oldham Athletic	112	(18)
1995–2001	Aberdeen	99	(6)
2001–2002	Barnsley	0	(0)
2002–2003	Plymouth Argyle	10	(0)
2003–2005	St Johnstone	26	(2)
2005–2006	Drogheda United		
Total		247	(26)

International career
1991–1993	Scotland under-21	15	(3)
1995	Scotland B	1	(0)
1995	Scotland	2	(0)
- * Club domestic league appearances and goals

Paul Robert Bernard (born 30 December 1972) is a Scottish former professional footballer who played as a midfielder for Oldham, Aberdeen, Barnsley, Plymouth Argyle, St Johnstone and Drogheda United. Bernard represented Scotland twice, with both appearances coming in 1995.

== Career ==
He was born in Edinburgh but moved to Manchester as a small child in the mid-1970s, and grew up as a Hearts supporter.

Bernard started his career with Oldham Athletic, and is remembered for scoring the equaliser in the famous 3–2 win over Sheffield Wednesday in only his second game for the club during the 1990–91 season when the Latics sealed the Second Division title and returned to the First Division after a 68-year exile. He was soon a regular player in the Boundary Park midfield, helping them achieve survival in the First Division in 1991–92 and the new FA Premier League in 1992–93. He helped them reach the FA Cup semi-finals in the 1993–94 campaign, and when the Latics took the lead over Manchester United with an extra time goal by Neil Pointon, it looked as though Bernard and his teammates were on their way to the club's first ever FA Cup final. However, a late equaliser by United's Mark Hughes forced a replay, which the Latics lost 4–1 at Maine Road. They were relegated on the final day of the season after only managing a 1–1 draw with Norwich City. He played a total of 112 league games for the Latics, scoring 18 goals.

He was then transferred to Aberdeen for £1M on 27 September 1995, and remained the only player that a Scottish club outside the Old Firm had spent £1 million on until the transfer of Thibault Klidjé by Hibernian F.C. in July 2025. Soon after joining Aberdeen, Bernard helped them to win the Scottish League Cup, but his career suffered after this point due to injuries and loss of form. As such Bernard has been associated with the misguided spending of Aberdeen in the 1990s, when relatively large amounts were spent without much success. Bernard was released by Aberdeen in 2001 after six seasons, 99 league games and six goals.

His playing career finished in 2006 after a year-long spell in Ireland with Drogheda United.

He was capped twice by the senior Scotland national team, with both of his appearances coming in 1995, following 16 under 21 and two "B" caps earlier in the decade.

== Career statistics ==
=== Appearances and goals by club, season and competition ===
Club	Season	League			National Cup		League Cup		Europe		Total	
Club	Season	Division	Apps	Goals	Apps	Goals	Apps	Goals	Apps	Goals	Apps	Goals
Oldham Athletic	1990-91	Second Division	2	1	-	-	-	-	-	-	2+	1+
Oldham Athletic	1991-92	First Division	21	5	-	-	-	-	-	-	21+	5+
Oldham Athletic	1992-93	Premier League	33	4	-	-	-	-	-	-	33+	4+
Oldham Athletic	1993-94	Premier League	32	5	-	-	-	-	-	-	32+	5+
Oldham Athletic	1994-95	First Division	17	2	-	-	-	-	-	-	17+	2+
Oldham Athletic	1995-96	First Division	7	1	-	-	-	-	-	-	7+	1+
Oldham Athletic	Total		112	18	-	-	-	-	-	-	137	21
Aberdeen	1995-96	Scottish Premier Division	31	1	3	1	2	0	0	0	36	2
Aberdeen	1996-97	Scottish Premier Division	14	0	0	0	1	0	1	0	16	0
Aberdeen	1997-98	Scottish Premier Division	17	0	1	0	4	0	0	0	22	0
Aberdeen	1998-99	SPL	9	1	0	0	0	0	0	0	9	1
Aberdeen	1999-00	SPL	25	4	7	1	3	0	0	0	35	5
Aberdeen	2000-01	SPL	3	0	0	0	0	0	1	0	4	0
Aberdeen	Total		99	6	11	2	10	0	2	0	122	8
Barnsley	2001-02	First Division	0	0	0	0	0	0	-	-	0	0
Barnsley	Total		0	0	0	0	0	0	-	-	0	0
Plymouth Argyle	2002-03	Second Division	10	0	0	0	0	0	-	-	10	0
Plymouth Argyle	Total		10	0	0	0	0	0	-	-	10	0
St Johnstone	2003-04	First Division	24	2	-	-	-	-	-	-	24+	2+
St Johnstone	2004-05	First Division	2	0	-	-	-	-	-	-	2+	0+
St Johnstone	Total		26	2	-	-	-	-	-	-	26+	2+
Drogheda United	2005-06	Ireland Premier Division	-	-	-	-	-	-	-	-	-	-
Drogheda United	Total		-	-	-	-	-	-	-	-	-	-
Career total			247+	26+	11+	2+	10+	0+	2	0	295+	31+

=== International ===
Appearances and goals by national team and year
National team	Year	Apps	Goals
Scotland	1995	2	0
Total		2	0

== Honours ==
- Scottish League Cup
  - Winner (1): 1995 (Aberdeen)
- FAI Cup
  - Winner (1): 2005 (Drogheda United)
