= Rick Holden =

English footballer (born 1964)

Personal information
- Full name: Richard William Holden
- Date of birth: 9 September 1964 (age 62)
- Place of birth: Skipton, England
- Position: Winger

Youth career
- 1985–1986: Carnegie College

Senior career*
| Years | Team | Apps | (Gls) |
| 1986 | Burnley | 1 | (0) |
| 1986–1988 | Halifax Town | 67 | (12) |
| 1988–1989 | Watford | 42 | (8) |
| 1989–1992 | Oldham Athletic | 129 | (19) |
| 1992–1993 | Manchester City | 51 | (3) |
| 1993–1995 | Oldham Athletic | 60 | (9) |
| 1995–1996 | Blackpool | 22 | (2) |
| 1996–2003 | Peel | | |
| Total | | 372 | (53) |

Managerial career
- 1997–2003: Peel (player-manager)
- 2007–2014: Peel
- * Club domestic league appearances and goals

Richard William Holden (born 9 September 1964) is an English former professional footballer who played as a winger for six clubs in a decade-long career.

== Early life ==
Born at Cawder Gill Hospital, Holden forged an interest in football at an early age, playing in the back streets and fields of Skipton and Embsay.

== Playing career ==
=== Burnley ===
While employed at West Marton Dairies in 1985, Holden was invited to train with Burnley. He made one Football League appearance for the Clarets, in a defeat at Leyton Orient, the following year. He was asked to leave by incoming manager Brian Miller after being unable to commit to full-time training due to his attendance at Carnegie College Leeds. He went on to achieve a degree in Human Movement in 1987.

During the summer of 1986, Holden played cricket for Saltaire in the Bradford League. It was during this period that he received a phone call from Halifax Town's assistant manager Billy Ayre, asking him to play in some pre-season friendlies.

=== Halifax Town ===
Holden joined Halifax Town as an amateur in August 1986. The Shaymen were then under the leadership of Mick Jones. He made his debut in a 3–0 defeat to Burnley at Turf Moor. At the end of the 1986–87 campaign, he was named the club's Player of the Year, and was rewarded with a professional contract with a weekly wage of £125.

To supplement his income until pre-season began, he worked at Webb's chicken factory at Cross Hills.

He remained at Halifax until the spring of 1988, at which point Billy Ayre had taken over from Peterborough-bound Mick Jones. After 67 league appearances and twelve goals, he was sold to Watford for £125,000.

=== Watford ===
Holden signed a four-year contract with the Hornets, upping his weekly wage to £450, with a £50 appearance bonus. His signing-on fee was £10,000, split into three instalments, and he also received a £2,000-per-year loyalty bonus.

=== Oldham Athletic ===
Holden joined Oldham just as the club was about to embark on one of the most notable seasons in its history, better known as the "pinch-me season", when the club reached the semi-final of the FA Cup and the final of the League Cup. Holden appeared in 64 of the club's 65 games. He was ever-present in the club's first season in the top flight for 68 years. Following the season 91–92, Holden was sold to Manchester City for the inaugural Premiership Season 92–93, for £1.2 million.

=== Manchester City ===
Following a season at City, and following the club's change in management early in the 1993–94 season, new manager Brian Horton sold Holden back to Oldham.

=== Return to Oldham ===
He was ever-present as the club reached the semi-final of the FA Cup, only to be relegated from the Premier League.

Holden opted to stay with the club despite the decline, but further problems were to come when Joe Royle left the club to manage Everton. New manager Graeme Sharp, favouring Mark Brennan on the left, put Holden in the reserves.

=== Blackpool ===
Holden finished his career with Blackpool in 1995–96, then under the managership of Sam Allardyce. He suffered a ruptured anterior cruciate ligament in February 1996 and failed to recover from it. He had been playing for ten years without knowledge that he had ruptured his posterior cruciate ligament in his right knee.

== Managerial career ==
=== Isle of Man Football League ===
In May 1996, Holden and his family moved to Peel on the Isle of Man. He worked at Noble's Hospital and became head of its outpatient physiotherapy department.

Shortly after arriving on the island, offers came in from local clubs wanting Holden to play for them. He started to turn out for Peel, and in 1999 became their manager. He played 199 games for them, scoring 105 goals (including 47 in 48 matches during the 1996–97 season). He left the club in 2003.

After leaving Noble's, in May 1999, Holden went into private practice at the Mount Murray Hotel.

He subsequently became assistant manager and head physio at Barnsley, in 2004, to managers Paul Hart and former Oldham teammate Andy Ritchie. With Ritchie, he helped Barnsley gain promotion to the Championship in 2006.

In 2007, after living in Cullingworth, West Yorkshire, Holden returned to the Isle of Man and opened Island Physiotherapy, based at Peel, where he was once again manager of the team until August 2014.

He also coached St John's, Ayre United and the Isle of Man FA's men's representative side, including an Island Games gold medal success in 2017. In 2024, he returned to Peel AFC as a coach, and leads the Human Movement and Performance Unit at the club as their consultant rehabilitation specialist.

=== FC Isle of Man. ===
On 24 September 2025, it was announced in a press release that Holden had replaced Paul Jones as manager of FC Isle of Man on a 'caretaker basis' until the club could undertake the relevant procedure to replace Jones.

== Personal life ==
In 1995, while at Blackpool, Holden obtained a degree in physiotherapy Salford University. In 2021, he attained a master's degree in football science and rehabilitation from the University of Central Lancashire, to complement his degrees in human movement and physiotherapy.

== Career statistics ==
Appearances and goals by club, season and competition
| Club | Season | League | | | FA Cup | | Other | | Total | |
| Club | Season | Division | Apps | Goals | Apps | Goals | Apps | Goals | Apps | Goals |
|---|---|---|---|---|---|---|---|---|---|---|
| Burnley | 1985–86 | Fourth Division | 1 | 0 | 0 | 0 | 0 | 0 | 1 | 0 |
| Halifax Town | 1986–87 | Fourth Division | 32 | 2 | 3 | 0 | 3 | 0 | 38 | 2 |
| Halifax Town | 1987–88 | Fourth Division | 35 | 10 | 4 | 0 | 7 | 0 | 46 | 10 |
| Halifax Town | Total | | 67 | 12 | 7 | 0 | 10 | 0 | 84 | 12 |
| Watford | 1987–88 | First Division | 10 | 2 | 0 | 0 | 0 | 0 | 10 | 2 |
| Watford | 1988–89 | Second Division | 32 | 6 | 6 | 1 | 6 | 1 | 44 | 8 |
| Watford | Total | | 42 | 8 | 6 | 1 | 6 | 1 | 54 | 10 |
| Oldham Athletic | 1989–90 | Second Division | 45 | 9 | 9 | 2 | 10 | 2 | 64 | 13 |
| Oldham Athletic | 1990–91 | Second Division | 42 | 5 | 2 | 0 | 4 | 1 | 48 | 6 |
| Oldham Athletic | 1991–92 | First Division | 42 | 5 | 2 | 0 | 4 | 1 | 48 | 6 |
| Oldham Athletic | Total | | 129 | 19 | 13 | 2 | 18 | 4 | 160 | 25 |
| Manchester City | 1992–93 | Premier League | 41 | 3 | 5 | 1 | 3 | 1 | 49 | 5 |
| Manchester City | 1993–94 | Premier League | 9 | 0 | 0 | 0 | 0 | 0 | 9 | 0 |
| Manchester City | Total | | 50 | 3 | 5 | 1 | 3 | 1 | 58 | 5 |
| Oldham Athletic | 1993–94 | Premier League | 29 | 6 | 7 | 1 | 2 | 0 | 38 | 7 |
| Oldham Athletic | 1994–95 | First Division | 31 | 3 | 1 | 0 | 3 | 0 | 35 | 3 |
| Oldham Athletic | Total | | 60 | 9 | 8 | 1 | 5 | 0 | 73 | 10 |
| Blackpool | 1995–96 | Second Division | 22 | 2 | 2 | 0 | 3 | 0 | 27 | 2 |
| Career total | | | 371 | 53 | 41 | 5 | 46 | 7 | 458 | 65 |

== Honours ==
Oldham Athletic

- Football League Second Division: 1990–91
- Football League Cup runner-up: 1989–90

Individual

- Halifax Town Player of the Year: 1986–87

== Publications ==
- Football: It's a Minging Life (Holden, Rick (2010), Football: It's a Minging Life!, Derby Books, ISBN 978-1-85983-854-9)
- Crusade to the Promised Land. Co author with Dave Moore.
- 14 Great Games: Oldham Athletic. Co author with Dave Moore
- Barnsley FC: Into The Championship
- Worms and Spaceships: My Time in Manx Football
- 101 Things That Get Our Goat: About Football
- Yorkshire Cricket Club: Every Day of the Year. Co author with Dave Moore
- Lancashire Cricket Club: Every Day of the Year. Co author with Dave Moore
- Mankind: Victim of Evolution
