= Brian Hillier =

Brian Hillier (1943 – 23 October 2008) was a football chairman most notable for being chairman of Swindon Town.

A lifelong Swindon Town supporter, he became chairman of the club in 1984 when they were in the Football League Fourth Division - the lowest division of the Football League. He appointed legendary Manchester United striker Lou Macari as player-manager and in 1986 Swindon Town won promotion from the Fourth Division as champions with a then national league record of 102 points. In 1987 a second successive promotion took Hillier's team into the Football League Second Division, where they had not played for more than a decade previously.

However, Hillier was arrested on suspicion of defrauding the Inland Revenue in January 1990 and was also suspected of placing a bet against his own team losing an FA Cup tie in the 1987-88 season. His team won promotion to the Football League First Division (top division of English football) four months later but shortly afterwards were found guilty on 36 charges of financial irregularities. This resulted in Sunderland being promoted in their place, and Swindon Town being relegated to the Football League Third Division with their place in the Second Division going to Tranmere Rovers. The club won some respite when they were reinstated to the Second Division on appeal, a decision that infuriated Tranmere Rovers.

Meanwhile, Hillier was forced to leave Swindon Town after receiving a six-month ban from football as penalty for the illegal bet. He, along with chief accountant Vince Farrar and former manager Lou Macari were committed for trial at Winchester Crown Court. On 29 July 1992, Macari was cleared of tax offences but Hillier and Farrar were both found guilty. Hillier received a one-year prison sentenced (later halved on appeal) and Farrar received a suspended six-month prison sentence. Hillier's ban from football was increased to three years.

After his ban from football expired, Hillier returned to the game as chairman of non-league Calne Town (members of the Western Football League). He remained in this position until his death from a stroke in October 2008, at the age of 65.
