= Alan McCarthy =

British footballer (born 1972)

Personal information
- Full name: Alan James McCarthy
- Date of birth: 11 January 1972 (age 54)
- Place of birth: Wandsworth, England
- Height: 5 ft 11 in (1.80 m)
- Position: Centre-back

Senior career*
| Years | Team | Apps | (Gls) |
| 1989–1995 | Queens Park Rangers | 11 | (0) |
| 1993–1994 | Watford (loan) | 9 | (0) |
| 1994 | Plymouth Argyle (loan) | 2 | (0) |
| 1995–1997 | Leyton Orient | 47 | (0) |
| 1998–? | Boreham Wood | | |

International career
- England (youth)
| | Wales U21 | 3 | |
- Wales B
- * Club domestic league appearances and goals

Alan James McCarthy (born 11 January 1972) is a retired footballer who played as a centre-back. During his career he played in the Football League First Division (later the Premier League) for Queens Park Rangers. During his time at QPR he spent loan spells at Watford and Plymouth Argyle, before joining Leyton Orient in 1995. Internationally, he played for England at youth level, but Wales at under-21 level.
