= David Currie (footballer) =

English footballer

Personal information
- Full name: David Norman Currie
- Date of birth: 27 November 1962 (age 63)
- Place of birth: Stockton, England
- Height: 6 ft 0 in (1.83 m)
- Position: Striker

Senior career*
Years	Team	Apps	(Gls)
1982–1986	Middlesbrough	113	(30)
1986–1988	Darlington	76	(33)
1988–1990	Barnsley	80	(30)
1990	Nottingham Forest	8	(1)
1990–1991	Oldham Athletic	31	(3)
1991–1994	Barnsley	77	(12)
1992	→ Rotherham United (loan)	5	(2)
1994	→ Huddersfield Town (loan)	7	(1)
1994–1997	Carlisle United	89	(14)
1997	→ Scarborough (loan)	16	(6)
- Whitby Town
- * Club domestic league appearances and goals

David Norman Currie (born 27 November 1962) is an English former footballer who played as a striker for Middlesbrough, Darlington, Barnsley, Nottingham Forest, Oldham Athletic, Rotherham United, Huddersfield Town, Carlisle United and Scarborough.

He joined Barnsley in 1988 and played 80 league games for them, scoring 30 goals. Currie joined Nottingham Forest in January 1990, and made his debut for them on 3 February, although in August 1990 he moved again to join Oldham after falling out of favour with manager Brian Clough.

== Honours ==
Oldham Athletic

- Football League Second Division: 1990–91

Carlisle United

- Football League Third Division: 1994–95
- Football League Trophy runner-up: 1994–95

Individual

- PFA Team of the Year: 1987–88 Fourth Division, 1988–89 Second Division
