= Ian Olney =

English footballer (born 1969)

Personal information
- Date of birth: 17 December 1969 (age 56)
- Place of birth: Luton, England
- Height: 6 ft 1 in (1.85 m)
- Position: Forward

Youth career
- –1986: Ebley F.C.
- 1986–1988: Aston Villa

Senior career*
Years	Team	Apps	(Gls)
1988–1992	Aston Villa	88	(16)
1992–1996	Oldham Athletic	46	(13)
1996–1997	Kidderminster Harriers		
2000–2001	Forest Green Rovers	2	(0)

International career
1990–1991	England U21	10	(3)
- * Club domestic league appearances and goals

Ian Olney (born 17 December 1969) is a former footballer who played as a forward.

Olney started his career at Aston Villa, scoring in his senior debut on 12 October 1988. That season saw three Second City derbies with Birmingham City. Drawn in the League Cup 2nd Round, Olney sat on the bench for the 2–0 victory at St Andrews. In the return leg Olney scored in the 5–0 victory with further goals by Derek Mountfield, Kevin Gage (2), and Tony Daley.

Ian Olney made 88 league appearances for Villa, scoring 16 goals over four years. He was sold to Oldham Athletic for £750,000, at that time Oldham's transfer record.

He was part of the Oldham Athletic team that dramatically survived relegation from the Premier League on the final day of the season, after defeating Southampton 4–3. He later played for Kidderminster Harriers and Forest Green Rovers.
