= Earl Barrett =

English footballer (born 1967)

Personal information
- Full name: Earl Delisser Barrett
- Date of birth: 28 April 1967 (age 59)
- Place of birth: Rochdale, England
- Position: Defender

Senior career*
Years	Team	Apps	(Gls)
1985–1987	Manchester City	3	(0)
1986	→ Chester City (loan)	12	(0)
1987–1992	Oldham Athletic	183	(7)
1992–1995	Aston Villa	116	(1)
1995–1998	Everton	74	(0)
1998	→ Sheffield United (loan)	5	(0)
1998–2000	Sheffield Wednesday	15	(0)
Total		408	(8)

International career
1990	England U21	4	(0)
1991–1992	England B	4	(0)
1991–1993	England	3	(0)
- * Club domestic league appearances and goals

Earl Delisser Barrett (born 28 April 1967) is an English football coach and former footballer who played as a defender, featuring in the Premier League for Oldham Athletic, Aston Villa, Everton and Sheffield Wednesday and in the Football League for Chester City and Sheffield United. He played mainly at right back though could also adapt to a central defensive role. He also gained three England caps while playing at Oldham and Aston Villa.

Since retiring Barrett has worked as a coach, notably serving on the coaching staff at both Oldham Athletic and Stoke City before emigrating to the United States where he is involved in coaching youngsters.

== Playing career ==
=== Club ===
As a teenager, Barrett helped Chester City to promotion from the Fourth Division in 1985–86 while on loan from Manchester City, where he came through the youth academy and played in three first team games.

At Oldham Athletic he was a member of the side that lost the 1990 Football League Cup Final to Nottingham Forest at Wembley and narrowly missed out on a place in the final of the 1989–90 FA Cup, losing in the semi-final replay to Manchester United at Maine Road, then helped the Lancashire side to the Second Division title and promotion to the First Division (which became the FA Premier League a year later) in 1990–91.

The £1.7 million fee Aston Villa paid for Barrett in February 1992 remains, as of 2019, Oldham's record transfer receipt. His greatest success as a player came with the Birmingham club: they finished runners-up in the 1992–93 FA Premier League and won the 1993–94 Football League Cup, beating Manchester United 3–1 at Wembley with Barrett playing the full 90 minutes.

He was bought by Everton midway through the 1994–95 season; although they won the FA Cup at its end, Barrett was cup-tied having already played in the competition that season for Aston Villa, meaning he could not claim a winner's medal. Much of his spell at Everton was dogged with a knee injury and he moved on to Sheffield Wednesday in February 1998 after making 78 appearances for the Merseysiders and spending a short time on loan at second-tier Sheffield United.

Injury again restricted his input at Sheffield Wednesday – the last game of his professional career was a 4–0 loss at Middlesbrough on 3 October 1998, though he remained under contract at Hillsborough until retiring at the end of the 1999–2000 season which coincided with the club's relegation from the top division.

=== International ===
Barrett earned his first cap for England on 3 June 1991, playing the whole 90 minutes in a 1-0 friendly win against New Zealand at the Mount Smart Stadium in Auckland. In June 1993, he featured in the 1993 United States Cup, starting in both the 1–1 draw with Brazil and the 2–1 defeat against Germany. These turned out to be Barrett's last caps for his country, for a total of three.

== Coaching career ==
In 2008, Barrett was part of a consortium considering investing in Port Vale F.C.

On 29 July 2009, he was appointed the under 14's coach at Stoke City's academy. He was doing a similar role at former club Oldham Athletic.

== Personal life ==
During his footballing career his nicknames were "The Pearl", Pearlinho and 'The Earl of Barrett'.

Earl Barrett's brother, Floyd, played professional basketball for the Oldham Celtics during the 1990s. He has three daughters, Georgia, India and Emmie with his wife Keely; they currently live in Houston, Texas where Barrett coaches the US Soccer Developmental Academy students at RISE.

== Honours ==
Oldham Athletic

- Football League Second Division: 1990–91
- Football League Cup runner-up: 1989–90

Aston Villa

- Football League Cup: 1993–94

Everton

- FA Charity Shield: 1995

Individual

- PFA Team of the Year: 1989–90 Second Division, 1990–91 Second Division
