= Andy Barlow (footballer) =

English footballer

Personal information
- Full name: Andrew John Barlow
- Date of birth: 24 November 1965 (age 60)
- Place of birth: Oldham, Lancashire, England
- Height: 5 ft 9 in (1.75 m)
- Position: Left back

Senior career*
Years	Team	Apps	(Gls)
1984–1995	Oldham Athletic	261	(5)
1993	→ Bradford City (loan)	2	(0)
1995–1997	Blackpool	81	(2)
1997–1999	Rochdale	68	(1)
Total		412	(8)
- * Club domestic league appearances and goals

Andrew John Barlow (born 24 November 1965) is an English former professional footballer. He played as a left-back in a career spanning fifteen years, and made more than 400 league appearances.

Barlow began his career with his hometown club, Oldham Athletic, and spent ten of his eleven years at Boundary Park playing under manager Joe Royle. At Oldham he played in the 1990 Football League Cup final.

In 1995, he signed for Sam Allardyce's Blackpool, with whom he spent two years before joining Rochdale. He brought his playing career to a close at Spotland. He scored his only goal for the club, against Brighton in a 1–1 draw, with the last touch of his professional career.

Post-retirement, he became a coach with the PFA, a role he continues to fulfill.

== Honours ==
Oldham Athletic

- Football League Second Division: 1990–91
- Football League Cup runner-up: 1989–90
