= Jon Hallworth =

English footballer

Personal information
- Full name: Jonathan Geoffrey Hallworth
- Date of birth: 26 October 1965 (age 61)
- Place of birth: Stockport, England
- Height: 6 ft 2 in (1.88 m)
- Position: Goalkeeper

Youth career
- Ipswich Town

Senior career*
| Years | Team | Apps | (Gls) |
| 1983–1989 | Ipswich Town | 45 | (0) |
| 1984 | → Swindon Town (loan) | 0 | (0) |
| 1985 | → Bristol Rovers (loan) | 2 | (0) |
| 1985 | → Fulham (loan) | 0 | (0) |
| 1989–1997 | Oldham Athletic | 174 | (0) |
| 1995 | Norwich City (loan) | 0 | (0) |
| 1997–2001 | Cardiff City | 123 | (0) |
| 2001–2002 | Newport County | 1 | (0) |
| 2002–2003 | Bangor City | 5 | (0) |
| Total | | 350 | (0) |
- * Club domestic league appearances and goals

Jonathan Geoffrey Hallworth (born 26 October 1965) is an English former professional footballer who played as a goalkeeper.

== Club career ==
Hallworth began his career as a trainee at Ipswich Town before signing a professional contract. During his time at the club he spent time on loan at Swindon Town, Bristol Rovers, where he made his professional debut, and Fulham before returning to become first choice goalkeeper until he was displaced by Craig Forrest.

In 1989, he joined Oldham Athletic in a deal worth £75,000. He went on to spend the majority of his career at Oldham and was the club's first choice goalkeeper for most of his eight years there. He helped them reach the FA Cup semi-finals and the Football League Cup final in his first season, promotion to the First Division after a 68-year exile in 1991 as Second Division champions, and to another FA Cup semi-final in 1994. In both FA Cup semi-finals, the Latics held Manchester United to a draw before losing in a replay. He also helped the Latics survive three years in the top flight (FA Premier League from 1992) before relegation in 1994.

He left the club in 1997 to sign for Cardiff City on a free transfer. He was first choice goalkeeper for three years before being replaced by Neil Alexander. One of his most notable games at Cardiff occurred in December 1999 away at Cambridge United; Cardiff had picked up three red cards and were reduced to eight men. Cambridge were awarded a late penalty but Hallworth saved from Martin Butler to help his side secure an unlikely 0–0 draw. He left Cardiff in 2001 and went on to play for fellow Welsh clubs Newport County and Bangor City. At the end of his career, Hallworth part owned the Liverpool based Gentlemen's Club "Rude" with friend and former full time football manager Stewart Holt.

== Honours ==
Oldham Athletic

- Football League Second Division: 1990–91

Individual

- PFA Team of the Year: 1998–99 Third Division
