= 1989–90 Football League Cup =

League Cup, Littlewoods Challenge Cup

Tournament details
- Country: England; Wales
- Teams: 92

Final positions
- Champions: Nottingham Forest (4th title)
- Runners-up: Oldham Athletic

Tournament statistics
- Top goal scorer: Andy Ritchie (10)

The 1989–90 Football League Cup (known as the Littlewoods Challenge Cup for sponsorship reasons) was the 30th season of the Football League Cup, a knockout competition for England's top 92 football clubs.

The competition began on 21 August 1989, and ended with the final on 29 April 1990 at the Old Wembley Stadium. The cup was won by Nottingham Forest who beat Oldham Athletic in the final, who regained the trophy after winning it the previous season. This was the second time that Nottingham Forest had won the trophy in successive seasons, having won previously in 1978 and 1979.

== First round ==
A total of 56 teams took part in the first round. All of the Third Division and Fourth Division sides entered, with eight of the Second Division clubs also starting in this round. The eight clubs consisted of the three teams promoted from the Third Division and the five teams finishing 17th to 21st in the Second Division from the 1988–89 season. Each tie was played across two legs.

=== First leg ===
Home team	Score	Away team	Date
Birmingham City	2–1	Chesterfield	22 August 1989
Blackpool	2–2	Burnley	22 August 1989
Brighton and Hove Albion	0–3	Brentford	23 August 1989
Bristol City	2–3	Reading	22 August 1989
Bristol Rovers	1–0	Portsmouth	23 August 1989
Cambridge United	3–1	Maidstone United (1897)	22 August 1989
Cardiff City	0–3	Plymouth Argyle	22 August 1989
Colchester United	3–4	Southend United	22 August 1989
Crewe Alexandra	4–0	Chester City	22 August 1989
Exeter City	3–0	Swansea City	23 August 1989
Fulham	0–1	Oxford United	23 August 1989
Gillingham	1–4	Leyton Orient	22 August 1989
Halifax Town	3–1	Carlisle United	22 August 1989
Hartlepool United	3–3	York City	23 August 1989
Huddersfield Town	1–1	Doncaster Rovers	22 August 1989
Hull City	1–0	Grimsby Town	22 August 1989
Mansfield Town	1–1	Northampton Town	22 August 1989
Peterborough United	2–0	Aldershot	23 August 1989
Preston North End	3–4	Tranmere Rovers	22 August 1989
Rochdale	2–1	Bolton Wanderers	22 August 1989
Scarborough	2–0	Scunthorpe United	22 August 1989
Sheffield United	1–1	Rotherham United	22 August 1989
Shrewsbury Town	3–0	Notts County	22 August 1989
Stockport County	1–0	Bury	21 August 1989
Torquay United	1–0	Hereford United	22 August 1989
Walsall	1–2	Port Vale	22 August 1989
Wolverhampton Wanderers	1–0	Lincoln City	22 August 1989
Wrexham	0–0	Wigan Athletic	22 August 1989

=== Second leg ===
Home team	Score	Away team	Date	Agg
Aldershot	6–2	Peterborough United	29 August 1989	6–4
Bolton Wanderers	5–1	Rochdale	29 August 1989	6–3
Brentford	1–1	Brighton and Hove Albion	29 August 1989	4–1
Burnley	0–1	Blackpool	29 August 1989	2–3
Bury	1–1	Stockport County	29 August 1989	1–2
Carlisle United	1–0	Halifax Town	29 August 1989	2–3
Chester City	0–2	Crewe Alexandra	29 August 1989	0–6
Chesterfield	1–1	Birmingham City	29 August 1989	2–3
Doncaster Rovers	1–2	Huddersfield Town	29 August 1989	2–3
Grimsby Town	2–0	Hull City	29 August 1989	2–1
Hereford United	3–0	Torquay United	30 August 1989	3–1
Leyton Orient	3–0	Gillingham	29 August 1989	7–1
Lincoln City	0–2	Wolverhampton Wanderers	30 August 1989	0–3
Maidstone United (1897)	0–1	Cambridge United	30 August 1989	1–4
Northampton Town	0–2	Mansfield Town	5 September 1989	1–3
Notts County	3–1	Shrewsbury Town	29 August 1989	3–4
Oxford United	3–5	Fulham	30 August 1989	4–5
Plymouth Argyle	0–2	Cardiff City	29 August 1989	3–2
Port Vale	1–0	Walsall	28 August 1989	3–1
Portsmouth	2–0	Bristol Rovers	29 August 1989	2–1
Reading	2–2	Bristol City	29 August 1989	5–4
Rotherham United	1–0	Sheffield United	29 August 1989	2–1
Scunthorpe United	1–1	Scarborough	29 August 1989	1–3
Southend United	2–1	Colchester United	29 August 1989	6–4
Swansea City	1–1	Exeter City	29 August 1989	1–4
Tranmere Rovers	3–1	Preston North End	29 August 1989	7–4
Wigan Athletic	5–0	Wrexham	30 August 1989	5–0
York City	4–1	Hartlepool United	29 August 1989	7–4

== Second round ==
A total of 64 teams took part in the second round, including the 28 winners from round one. The remaining Second Division clubs entered in this round, as well as the 20 sides from the First Division. Each tie was again played across two legs.

=== First leg ===
Home team	Score	Away team	Date
Arsenal	2–0	Plymouth Argyle	19 September 1989
Aston Villa	2–1	Wolverhampton Wanderers	20 September 1989
Barnsley	1–1	Blackpool	19 September 1989
Birmingham City	2–2	West Ham United	19 September 1989
Bolton Wanderers	2–1	Watford	19 September 1989
Brentford	2–1	Manchester City	19 September 1989
Cambridge United	2–1	Derby County	19 September 1989
Charlton Athletic	3–1	Hereford United	20 September 1989
Chelsea	1–1	Scarborough	19 September 1989
Crewe Alexandra	0–1	Bournemouth	19 September 1989
Crystal Palace	1–2	Leicester City	19 September 1989
Exeter City	3–0	Blackburn Rovers	20 September 1989
Grimsby Town	3–1	Coventry City	19 September 1989
Ipswich Town	0–1	Tranmere Rovers	19 September 1989
Leyton Orient	0–2	Everton	19 September 1989
Liverpool	5–2	Wigan Athletic	19 September 1989
Mansfield Town	3–4	Luton Town	19 September 1989
Middlesbrough	4–0	Halifax Town	20 September 1989
Norwich City	1–1	Rotherham United	20 September 1989
Nottingham Forest	1–1	Huddersfield Town	20 September 1989
Oldham Athletic	2–1	Leeds United	19 September 1989
Port Vale	1–2	Wimbledon	18 September 1989
Portsmouth	2–3	Manchester United	20 September 1989
Queens Park Rangers	2–1	Stockport County	20 September 1989
Reading	3–1	Newcastle United	19 September 1989
Sheffield Wednesday	0–0	Aldershot	20 September 1989
Shrewsbury Town	0–3	Swindon Town	19 September 1989
Stoke City	1–0	Millwall	19 September 1989
Sunderland	1–1	Fulham	19 September 1989
Tottenham Hotspur	1–0	Southend United	20 September 1989
West Bromwich Albion	1–3	Bradford City	20 September 1989
York City	0–1	Southampton	20 September 1989

=== Second leg ===
Home team	Score	Away team	Date	Agg
Aldershot	0–8	Sheffield Wednesday	3 October 1989	0–8
Blackburn Rovers	2–1	Exeter City	3 October 1989	2–4
Blackpool	1–1	Barnsley	3 October 1989	2–2
Bournemouth	0–0	Crewe Alexandra	3 October 1989	1–0
Bradford City	3–5	West Bromwich Albion	4 October 1989	6–6
Coventry City	3–0	Grimsby Town	4 October 1989	4–3
Derby County	5–0	Cambridge United	4 October 1989	6–2
Everton	2–2	Leyton Orient	3 October 1989	4–2
Fulham	0–3	Sunderland	3 October 1989	1–4
Halifax Town	0–1	Middlesbrough	3 October 1989	0–5
Hereford United	0–1	Charlton Athletic	4 October 1989	1–4
Huddersfield Town	3–3	Nottingham Forest	3 October 1989	4–4
Leeds United	1–2	Oldham Athletic	3 October 1989	2–4
Leicester City	2–3	Crystal Palace	4 October 1989	4–4
Luton Town	7–2	Mansfield Town	3 October 1989	11–5
Manchester City	4–1	Brentford	4 October 1989	5–3
Manchester United	0–0	Portsmouth	3 October 1989	3–2
Millwall	2–0	Stoke City	4 October 1989	2–1
Newcastle United	4–0	Reading	4 October 1989	5–3
Plymouth Argyle	1–6	Arsenal	3 October 1989	1–8
Rotherham United	0–2	Norwich City	3 October 1989	1–3
Scarborough	3–2	Chelsea	4 October 1989	4–3
Southampton	2–0	York City	3 October 1989	3–0
Southend United	3–2	Tottenham Hotspur	4 October 1989	3–3
Stockport County	0–0	Queens Park Rangers	2 October 1989	1–2
Swindon Town	3–1	Shrewsbury Town	3 October 1989	6–1
Tranmere Rovers	1–0	Ipswich Town	3 October 1989	2–0
Watford	1–1	Bolton Wanderers	3 October 1989	2–3
West Ham United	1–1	Birmingham City	4 October 1989	3–2
Wigan Athletic	0–3	Liverpool	4 October 1989	2–8
Wimbledon	3–0	Port Vale	4 October 1989	5–1
Wolverhampton Wanderers	1–1	Aston Villa	4 October 1989	2–3

== Third round ==
A total of 32 teams took part in the third round, all 32 winners from round two. Unlike the previous two rounds, this round was played over one leg. Frank Bunn scores a new League Cup record six goals in Oldham's 7–0 victory over Scarborough.

=== Ties ===
Home team	Result	Away team	Date
Arsenal	1–0	Liverpool	25 October 1989
Aston Villa	0–0	West Ham United	25 October 1989
Crystal Palace	0–0	Nottingham Forest	24 October 1989
Derby County	2–1	Sheffield Wednesday	25 October 1989
Everton	3–0	Luton Town	24 October 1989
Exeter City	3–0	Blackpool	25 October 1989
Manchester City	3–1	Norwich City	25 October 1989
Manchester United	0–3	Tottenham Hotspur	25 October 1989
Middlesbrough	1–1	Wimbledon	25 October 1989
Newcastle United	0–1	West Bromwich Albion	25 October 1989
Oldham Athletic	7–0	Scarborough	25 October 1989
Queens Park Rangers	1–2	Coventry City	25 October 1989
Southampton	1–0	Charlton Athletic	24 October 1989
Sunderland	1–1	Bournemouth	24 October 1989
Swindon Town	3–3	Bolton Wanderers	24 October 1989
Tranmere Rovers	3–2	Millwall	23 October 1989

25 October 1989

Arsenal	1 – 0	Liverpool
Smith 80'

Highbury, London
25 October 1989

Aston Villa	0 – 0	West Ham United

Villa Park, Birmingham
25 October 1989

Crystal Palace	0 – 0	Nottingham Forest

Selhurst Park, South Norwood, London
24 October 1989

Everton	3 – 0	Luton Town
Newell (2); Nevin

Goodison Park, Liverpool
25 October 1989

Manchester United	0 – 3	Tottenham Hotspur
		Lineker 22'; Samways; Nayim 88'

Old Trafford, Manchester
25 October 1989

Oldham Athletic	7 – 0	Scarborough
Bunn (6); Ritchie

Boundary Park, Oldham

=== Replays ===
Home team	Result	Away team	Date
Bolton Wanderers	1–1	Swindon Town	7 November 1989
Bournemouth	0–1	Sunderland	7 November 1989
Nottingham Forest	5–0	Crystal Palace	1 November 1989
West Ham United	1–0	Aston Villa	8 November 1989
Wimbledon	1–0	Middlesbrough	8 November 1989

7 November 1989

Bournemouth	0 – 1	Sunderland
		Gabbiadini

Dean Court, Bournemouth
8 November 1989

West Ham United	1 – 0	Aston Villa
Dicks

Upton Park, London

=== 2nd Replay ===
Home team	Result	Away team	Date
Bolton Wanderers	1–1	Swindon Town	14 November 1989

=== 3rd Replay ===
Home team	Result	Away team	Date
Swindon Town	2–1	Bolton Wanderers	20 November 1989

== Fourth round ==
A total of 16 teams took part in the fourth round, all 16 winners from round three. Once again this round was played over one leg.

=== Ties ===
Home team	Result	Away team	Date
Derby County	2–0	West Bromwich Albion	22 November 1989
Exeter City	2–2	Sunderland	29 November 1989
Manchester City	0–1	Coventry City	22 November 1989
Nottingham Forest	1–0	Everton	22 November 1989
Oldham Athletic	3–1	Arsenal	22 November 1989
Swindon Town	0–0	Southampton	29 November 1989
Tranmere Rovers	2–2	Tottenham Hotspur	22 November 1989
West Ham United	1–0	Wimbledon	22 November 1989

29 November 1989

Exeter City	2 – 2	Sunderland
Rowbotham 17'; Neville		Armstrong; Gates

St James Park, Exeter
22 November 1989

Nottingham Forest	1 – 0	Everton
Chapman 83'

The City Ground, Nottingham
22 November 1989

Oldham Athletic	3 – 1	Arsenal
Ritchie 45'; Henry		Quinn 90'

Boundary Park, Oldham
29 November 1989

Swindon Town	0 – 0	Southampton

The County Ground, Swindon
22 November 1989

Tranmere Rovers	2 – 2	Tottenham Hotspur
Vickers; Steele		Gascoigne; Lineker

Prenton Park, Birkenhead

=== Replays ===
Home team	Result	Away team	Date
Southampton	4–2	Swindon Town	16 January 1990
Sunderland	5–2	Exeter City	5 December 1989
Tottenham Hotspur	4–0	Tranmere Rovers	29 November 1989

29 November 1989

Tottenham Hotspur	4 – 0	Tranmere Rovers
Howells 30'; Stewart; Mabbutt; Allen

White Hart Lane, Tottenham, London

== Fifth round ==
The eight winners from the fourth round took part in the fifth round. Once again this round was played over one leg.

=== Ties ===
17 January 1990

Nottingham Forest	2 – 2	Tottenham Hotspur
Crosby; Parker		Lineker; Sedgley

City Ground, Nottingham
24 January 1990

Southampton	2 – 2	Oldham Athletic
Le Tissier (pen.)		Ritchie 90'

The Dell, Southampton
17 January 1990

Sunderland	0 – 0	Coventry City

Roker Park, Sunderland
17 January 1990

West Ham Utd	1 – 1	Derby County
Dicks		Saunders

London E13, West Ham United
Attendance: 27,854

=== Replays ===
24 January 1990

Coventry City	5 – 0	Sunderland
Livingstone (4); Gynn

Highfield Road, Coventry
24 January 1990

Derby County	0 – 0 a.e.t.	West Ham Utd

Baseball Ground, Derby
31 January 1990

Oldham Athletic	2 – 0	Southampton
Ritchie; Milligan

Boundary Park, Oldham
24 January 1990

Tottenham Hotspur	2 – 3	Nottingham Forest
Nayim; Walsh		Hodge; Jemson

White Hart Lane, Tottenham, London

=== 2nd Replay ===
31 January 1990

West Ham United	2 – 1	Derby County
Slater; Keen		Saunders

Upton Park, London

== Semi-finals ==
As with the first two rounds, the semi-final ties were played over two legs. Holders Nottingham Forest narrowly defeated Coventry City, while West Ham United bowed out in the semi-finals for the second year running, this time at the hands of Oldham Athletic 6–3 on aggregate. Oldham's 6-0 first leg victory all but sealed their first ever appearance in a major final and at Wembley, was a record for a league cup semi-final until Manchester City defeated Burton Albion 9–0 in the first-leg of the semi-final tie in 2019. Five years earlier, in 2014, City had equaled Oldham's record, again at the expense of West Ham, with a 6-0 first-leg semi-final victory, and on that occasion City's 3–0 win in the second leg at Upton Park had set a record for an aggregate victory (9-0) which City themselves surpassed in 2019 with a 1-0 second-leg win at Burton for a 10-0 aggregate semi-final win.

=== First leg ===
11 February 1990

Nottingham Forest	2 – 1	Coventry City
Clough 36' (pen.); Pearce 79'		Livingstone 72'

City Ground, Nottingham
14 February 1990

Oldham Athletic	6 – 0	West Ham United
Adams 12'; Ritchie 18'; Barrett 33'; R. Holden 46'; Palmer 70'

Boundary Park, Oldham
Referee: Lester Shapter (Torquay)

=== Second leg ===
25 February 1990

Coventry City	0 – 0	Nottingham Forest

Highfield Road, Coventry

Nottingham Forest won 2–1 on aggregate.

7 March 1990

West Ham United	3 – 0	Oldham Athletic
Martin; Dicks (pen.); Kelly

Upton Park, London
Referee: Terry Holbrook (Walsall)

Oldham Athletic won 6–3 on aggregate.

== Final ==
29 April 1990
15:00

Nottingham Forest	1–0	Oldham Athletic
Jemson 47'

Wembley Stadium, London
Attendance: 74,343
Referee: John Martin (Alton, Hampshire)
