= Nick Henry =

English footballer (born 1969)

Personal information
- Date of birth: 21 February 1969 (age 57)
- Place of birth: Liverpool, England
- Height: 5 ft 6 in (1.68 m)
- Position: Midfielder

Senior career*
| Years | Team | Apps | (Gls) |
| 1987–1997 | Oldham Athletic | 273 | (19) |
| 1997–1999 | Sheffield United | 16 | (0) |
| 1999 | → Walsall (loan) | 8 | (0) |
| 1999–2002 | Tranmere Rovers | 89 | (2) |
| 2002 | Scarborough | 22 | (2) |
| Total | | 408 | (23) |

Managerial career
- 2004–2005: Scarborough
- * Club domestic league appearances and goals

Nick Henry (born 21 February 1969) is an English former professional footballer who played as a midfielder and spent most of his career at Oldham Athletic.

== Career ==
=== Oldham Athletic ===
Henry was born in Liverpool, England. He started his professional career with Oldham Athletic after coming up through their youth academy. He made his debut in the 1986–87 season under Joe Royle. He played a major part in the club's most successful period, including the 1989–90 cup runs, reaching the final of the League Cup and the semi-final of the FA Cup, with Henry famously scoring in the 3–1 League Cup victory over Arsenal. He again played a major part in the club's promotion to the top flight the following season, and a year later he scored on the opening day of the brand new Premier League, in a 1–1 draw against Chelsea in 1992. In ten years at the club he made 273 league appearances, scoring 19 goals.

During Oldham's 1989–90 FA Cup semi-final replay against Manchester United, with the scores level, Henry's long range shot cannoned against the cross-bar and appeared, from television pictures, to have crossed the goal line before bouncing back out into play. No goal was given, and Manchester United went on to win the tie with a goal from Mark Robins.

=== Sheffield United ===
On 28 February 1997, Henry earned a £500,000 move to Sheffield United. His debut came on 7 March 1997 against Barnsley. The following season (1997–98) he only made one appearance against Charlton Athletic. Henry went on to making only 21 appearances for the club, failing to score any goals, and towards the end of his Bramall Lane spell he was loaned out to Walsall for two months at the end of the season, where despite failing to score any goals he helped contribute to the Black Country side winning promotion with six wins in his eight appearances.

=== Tranmere Rovers ===
Henry moved on to Tranmere Rovers in the Summer of 1999 where he spent a couple of years in the first team, making 89 appearances and playing in the 2000 Football League Cup Final, the second League Cup Final of his career, 10 years after the first. Earlier that season he scored the winning goal as Tranmere memorably beat Premier League side West Ham United 1–0 in the FA Cup.

=== Scarborough ===
On 12 July 2002, Henry joined Scarborough F.C. on a free transfer. On 17 August he got sent off on his Scarborough debut in the 1–1 draw at Burton Albion. He went on to make 24 appearances (two as sub) for Scarborough, scoring two goals. He later managed the club, before being sacked after a run of poor results.

== Honours ==
Oldham Athletic

- Football League Second Division: 1990–91
- Football League Cup runner-up: 1989–90

Tranmere Rovers

- Football League Cup runner-up: 1999–2000
