= Andy Ritchie (English footballer) =

English footballer and manager (born 1960)

Personal information
- Full name: Andrew Timothy Ritchie
- Date of birth: 28 November 1960 (age 65)
- Place of birth: Manchester, Lancashire, England
- Height: 5 ft 10 in (1.78 m)
- Positions: Midfielder; forward

Youth career
- Manchester United

Senior career*
Years	Team	Apps	(Gls)
1977–1980	Manchester United	42	(13)
1980–1983	Brighton & Hove Albion	102	(26)
1983–1987	Leeds United	159	(44)
1987–1995	Oldham Athletic	250	(104)
1995–1997	Scarborough	76	(20)
1997–1999	Oldham Athletic	32	(3)
Total		661	(210)

International career
1976	England Schoolboys	8	(6)
1978	England Youth	4	(0)
1982	England U21	1	(0)

Managerial career
- 1998–2001: Oldham Athletic
- 2005–2006: Barnsley
- 2007–2008: Huddersfield Town
- * Club domestic league appearances and goals

Andrew Timothy Ritchie (born 28 November 1960) is an English former footballer and manager. His career spanned 22 years, during which he played for five different clubs. He began his career at Manchester United, for whom he made 42 league appearances and scored 13 goals. In 1980, he moved south to Brighton & Hove Albion, where he spent three years. He made just over a century of league appearances and scored 26 goals. In 1983, he returned north to sign for Leeds United. In four years, he made over 150 league appearances and scored 44 goals.

Ritchie spent the majority of his career at Oldham Athletic, between 1987 and 1995 initially. He made 250 league appearances for the club, scoring 104 goals. His career wound down with two-year spells at Scarborough and back at Oldham before his retirement in 1999. He was player/manager of Oldham in the year prior to his retirement, then managed the club for another two years after hanging up his boots. He went on to manage Barnsley and Huddersfield Town, both for a year.

After playing for England Schoolboys in 1976 and England Youth in 1978, Ritchie made one appearance for England under-21s in 1982.

== Playing career ==
After playing for England Schoolboys (once scoring three goals against Germany), he started his career in 1977–78 with Manchester United and scored a hat-trick against Leeds United while aged just 18 and another hat-trick against Spurs when 19, but was then sold to Brighton & Hove Albion.

He was later sold to Leeds United, for whom he scored two hat-tricks during the 1984–85 season. He also helped the club reach the semi-finals of the FA Cup in the 1986–87 season.

He served the Elland Road club until 1987, when he signed for Oldham Athletic. He stayed at Oldham for eight years, during one of the most successful periods of the club's history. This included a run to the final of the Football League Cup in 1990, reaching the FA Cup semi-finals in the same year (where they took Manchester United to a replay), before sealing the Second Division title in 1991. They stayed in the top flight for three years, becoming founder members of the FA Premier League in 1992, and reached another FA Cup semi-final in 1994, where Oldham took a 1–0 lead against Manchester United in extra time before a late equaliser forced a replay, which Oldham lost 4–1.

On leaving Oldham in 1995, he spent two years in Division Three with Scarborough.

In his senior career, he made 661 appearances (88 as substitute) and scored 210 goals. He played his last game, for Oldham, in the 1998–99 season, by which time he had returned to the Boundary Park club as player–coach.

== Managerial career ==
Following the sacking of Graeme Sharp, he returned to Oldham in March 1997 initially as Neil Warnock's assistant, but Warnock left to manage Bury at the end of the following season and Ritchie was appointed manager. His first season the team struggled with a small budget he had to rely mostly on youth players and the club survived relegation to the first team and the prospect of being the first Founder Members of the Premier League to be relegated to the bottom Division. The following season despite a bad start he managed to turn the fortunes around with some impressive displays, most notably the endings of top of the table Wigan's unbeaten record. The 2000–01 season was similar to the previous season with the club recovering from a poor start but the signing of David Eyres and Tony Carss helped steer the club to midtable safety. In the summer of 2001 the club was taken over by businessman Chris Moore, initially the club started the 2001–02 season well but following a poor run of results he was dismissed in November.

After a successful spell back at Elland Road in charge of Youth Development, Ritchie left to become Paul Hart's assistant at Barnsley. After Hart was sacked in March 2005, Ritchie's successful spell as caretaker manager led to him being confirmed as full-time manager in May 2005. In the 2005–06 season, he led the club to the League One playoff final against Swansea City. The match was played on 27 May 2006 at the Millennium Stadium in Cardiff. Barnsley's victory on penalties (following a 2–2 draw) secured promotion to the Football League Championship.

Ritchie was approached by Sheffield Wednesday about their vacant manager's position, following the sacking of Paul Sturrock in October 2006. However, the request was turned down by Barnsley. Ritchie was sacked by Barnsley on 21 November 2006, with the team in the relegation zone of the League Championship.

Ritchie was appointed Huddersfield Town manager on 11 April 2007. He left the club by mutual consent on 1 April 2008 after an indifferent season, ironically following an embarrassing 4–1 defeat at the hands of his former club Oldham Athletic on 29 March. He managed the team for 51 games, winning 22, losing 24 and drawing 5. The highlight was undoubtedly the FA Cup run which saw Town win against Birmingham City and, ironically again, at Oldham Athletic before bowing out to Premier League outfit Chelsea in the 5th Round, the first time the club had been that far for 10 years.

He is doing punditry for BBC Radio Leeds and MUTV (Manchester United TV), and was in the frame for the vacant manager's job at Football League Two side Grimsby Town, following the sacking of Alan Buckley; however, Ritchie was overlooked for the job, which in turn went to Mike Newell.

== Managerial statistics ==
Team	Nat	From	To	Record				
Team	Nat	From	To	G	W	L	D	Win %
Oldham Athletic	(England)	7 May 1998	31 October 2001	179	59	75	45	32.96
Barnsley	(England)	4 March 2005	21 November 2006	88	29	28	31	32.95
Huddersfield Town	(England)	11 April 2007	1 April 2008	51	22	24	5	43.14

== Honours ==
=== As a player ===
Oldham Athletic

- Football League Second Division: 1990–91
- Football League Cup runner-up: 1989–90

Individual

- PFA Team of the Year: 1989–90 Second Division

=== As a manager ===
Barnsley

- Football League One play-offs: 2006

Individual

- Football League One Manager of the Month: March 2005, October 2005
