= Roger Palmer (footballer) =

English footballer

Personal information
- Full name: Roger Neil Palmer
- Date of birth: 30 January 1959 (age 67)
- Place of birth: Manchester, England
- Height: 5 ft 10 in (1.78 m)
- Positions: Attacking midfielder; forward

Senior career*
Years	Team	Apps	(Gls)
1977–1980	Manchester City	31	(9)
1980–1994	Oldham Athletic	461	(141)
Total		492	(150)
- * Club domestic league appearances and goals

Roger Palmer (born 30 January 1959) is an English former footballer. He played for Manchester City and Oldham Athletic. He is the all-time leading goal-scorer at Oldham.

In January 2008, the BBC Sport website put out an appeal for information on Palmer's whereabouts, ahead of the Oldham v Everton FA Cup Third Round tie. The teams last played in a cup tie in 1990, with Palmer the only player whose whereabouts were unknown.

== Honours ==
Oldham Athletic

- Football League Second Division: 1990–91
- Football League Cup runner-up: 1989–90
