= 1998–99 Notts County F.C. season =

Notts County
1998–99 season
- Chairman: Derek Pavis
- Manager: Sam Allardyce
- Stadium: Meadow Lane
- Second Division: 16th
- FA Cup: Third round
- League Cup: First round
- Auto Windscreens Shield: First round
- Top goalscorer: League: All: Gary Jones
- Highest home attendance: League 10,316
- Lowest home attendance: League 3,294
- Average home league attendance: League 5,635

During the 1998–99 English football season, Notts County F.C. competed in the Football League Second Division.

== Season summary ==
In the 1998–99 season Notts County finished in 16th position, 4 points clear of the relegation zone.

== Final league table ==
Pos	Team	Pld	W	D	L	GF	GA	GD	Pts
14	Blackpool	46	14	14	18	44	54	−10	56
15	Burnley	46	13	16	17	54	73	−19	55
16	Notts County	46	14	12	20	52	61	−9	54
17	Wrexham	46	13	14	19	43	62	−19	53
18	Colchester United	46	12	16	18	52	70	−18	52

Rules for classification: 1) Points; 2) Goals scored; 3) Goal difference

== Results ==
Notts County's score comes first

=== Legend ===
Win	Draw	Loss

=== Football League Second Division ===
Date	Opponent	Venue	Result	Attendance	Scorers
8 August 1998	Oldham	A	3–1	5,709	
15 August 1998	Bournemouth	H	1–2	5,269	
22 August 1998	Northampton Town	A	1–1	6,141	Torpey
29 August 1998	Manchester City	H	1–1	10,316	Hendon
31 August 1998	Macclesfield Town	A	1–0	3,148	
5 September 1998	Wigan	H	0–1	4,445	
8 September 1998	Blackpool	A	0–1	3,849	
12 September 1998	Fulham	H	1–0	5,805	Hendon
18 September 1998	Walsall	A	2–3	3,991	
26 September 1998	Millwall	H	3–1	5,016	
3 October 1998	Wycombe Wanderers	A	1–1	4,164	
10 October 1998	Lincoln City	H	2–3	6,458	
17 October 1998	Burnley	A	1–1	10,559	Pearce
20 October 1998	Chesterfield	A	0–3	4,506	
24 October 1998	Bristol Rovers	H	1–1	4,822	
31 October 1998	Stoke City	H	1–0	8,546	
7 November 1998	York City	A	1–1	3,391	
21 November 1998	Colchester United	H	1–3	4,598	
28 November 1998	Wrexham	A	0–1	2,811	
12 December 1998	Preston North End	H	2–3	5,096	
19 December 1998	Gillingham	A	0–4	6,072	
26 December 1998	Northampton Town	H	3–1	6,131	Grant, Tierney, Richardson
28 December 1998	Reading	A	0–1	13,026	
8 January 1999	Oldham Athletic	H	0–1	4,669	
16 January 1999	Bournemouth	A	0–2	5,968	
30 January 1999	Reading	H	1–1	5,192	
13 February 1999	Blackpool	H	0–1	4,778	
16 February 1999	Wigan	A	0–3	2,971	
20 February 1999	Fulham	A	1–2	11,909	Owers
23 February 1999	Luton Town	A	1–0	4,021	
27 February 1999	Walsall	H	2–1	6,172	
6 March 1999	Millwall	A	3–1	6,042	
13 March 1999	York	H	4–2	5,400	
16 March 1999	Manchester City	A	1–2	26,502	Stallard
20 March 1999	Stoke City	A	3–2	9,565	
27 March 1999	Bristol Rovers	A	1–1	5,899	
3 April 1999	Burnley	H	0–0	6,625	
5 April 1999	Lincoln City	A	1–0	5,745	
10 April 1999	Chesterfield	H	2–0	5,121	
13 April 1999	Wrexham	H	1–1	3,294	
16 April 1999	Colchester United	A	1–2	4,215	
24 April 1999	Luton Town	H	1–2	5,583	
27 April 1999	Wycombe Wanderers	H	1–0	4,721	
1 May 1999	Preston North End	A	1–1	11,862	
4 May 1999	Macclesfield Town	H	1–1	3,747	
8 May 1999	Gillingham	H	0–1	7,815	

=== FA Cup ===
Round	Date	Opponent	Venue	Result	Attendance	Goalscorers
R1	15 November 1998	Hendon	A	0–0		
R1	1 December 1998	Hendon	H	3–0		
R2	5 December 1998	Wigan Athletic	H	1–1		
R2	15 December 1998	Wigan Athletic	A	0–0 (4–2 on penalties)		
R3	2 January 1999	Sheffield United	A	1–1		
R3	23 January 1999	Sheffield United	H	3–4		

=== League Cup ===
Round	Date	Opponent	Venue	Result	Attendance	Goalscorers
R1 1st Leg	11 Aug 1998	Manchester City	H	0–2	5795	
R1 2nd Leg	19 Aug 1998	Manchester City	A	1–7 (lost 1–9 on agg)	?	

=== Football League Trophy ===
Round	Date	Opponent	Venue	Result	Attendance	Goalscorers
R1	22 Dec 1998	Hull City	H	0–1		

== Squad ==
Note: Flags indicate national team as defined under FIFA eligibility rules; some limited exceptions apply. Players may hold more than one non-FIFA nationality.

No.	Pos.	Nation	Player
—	GK	ENG	Brian Parkin
—	GK	ENG	Paul Gibson
—	GK	WAL	Darren Ward
—	DF	ENG	Alex Dyer
—	DF	ENG	Chris Fairclough
—	DF	IRL	Steve Finnan
—	DF	ENG	Ian Hendon
—	DF	ENG	Dennis Pearce
—	DF	ENG	Matt Redmile
—	DF	ENG	Mark Warren
—	MF	ENG	Ian Richardson
—	MF	ENG	Gary Strodder
—	MF	ENG	Terry Henshaw
—	MF	ENG	Andy Hughes
—	MF	ENG	Mark Robson
—	FW	ENG	Craig Dudley
—	FW	ENG	Sean Farrell
—	FW	ENG	Justin Jackson
—	FW	ENG	Gary Jones

No.	Pos.	Nation	Player
—	FW	ENG	Gerry Creaney
—	FW	ENG	Mark Stallard
—	FW	ENG	Peter Beadle
—	FW	ENG	Anthony Garcia
—	FW	ENG	Richard Holmes
—	FW	ENG	Kevin Rapley
—	FW	ENG	Shaun Murray
—	FW	ENG	Fran Tierney
—	FW	ENG	Mark Quayle
—	FW	ENG	Lee Matthews
—	FW	ENG	Jermaine Pennant
—	FW	ENG	Brian Parkin
—	FW	ENG	Andy Goram
—	FW	ENG	Duane Darby
—	MF	ENG	Chris Billy
—	FW	GHA	Kim Grant
—	FW	IRL	Dominic Foley
—	FW	ENG	Steve Torpey
—	FW	ENG	Adam Webster
