= 1999–2000 Notts County F.C. season =

Notts County
1999–2000 season
- Manager: Sam Allardyce (until October); Gary Brazil
- Stadium: Meadow Lane
- Football League Second Division: 8th
- FA Cup: First round
- Worthington Cup: Second round
- Auto Windscreens Shield: First round (Northern section)
- Top goalscorer: Stallard (14)
Home colours

During the 1999–2000 English football season, Notts County F.C. competed in the Football League Second Division.

== Season summary ==
Despite the departure of manager Sam Allardyce to his old club, Bolton Wanderers, in October, Notts County enjoyed a strong season in the Second Division to finish 8th, although they finished some distance from the higher-placed promotion contenders, finishing 15 points behind the team that finished just above them, Bristol Rovers.

== Squad ==
Note: Flags indicate national team as defined under FIFA eligibility rules; some limited exceptions apply. Players may hold more than one non-FIFA nationality.

No.	Pos.	Nation	Player
1	GK	WAL	Darren Ward
2	DF	ENG	Richard Liburd
3	DF	ENG	Dennis Pearce
4	DF	ENG	Mark Warren
5	DF	ENG	Matt Redmile
6	DF	ENG	Ian Richardson
7	MF	ENG	Francis Tierney
8	MF	ENG	Paul Bolland
9	FW	ENG	Mark Stallard
10	FW	ENG	David Cross
11	MF	ENG	Shaun Murray
12	MF	ENG	Gary Owers
13	GK	ENG	Paul Gibson
14	MF	ENG	Andy Hughes

No.	Pos.	Nation	Player
15	FW	ENG	Kevin Rapley
16	DF	ENG	Alex Dyer
17	FW	ENG	Duane Darby
18	FW	ENG	Sean Farrell
19	DF	ENG	Richard Holmes
20	MF	ENG	Michael Brough
21	FW	ENG	Adam Webster
22	MF	ENG	Dean Howell
23	FW	IRL	Paul Heffernan
24	DF	WAL	Clayton Blackmore
25	GK	ENG	James Lindley
26	MF	ENG	Craig Ramage
27	GK	IRL	Saul Deeney
29	MF	ENG	Ryan Ford

=== Left club during season ===
Note: Flags indicate national team as defined under FIFA eligibility rules; some limited exceptions apply. Players may hold more than one non-FIFA nationality.

No.	Pos.	Nation	Player
10	FW	ENG	Peter Beadle (to Bristol City)
10	FW	AUS	Danny Allsopp (on loan from Manchester City)
10	FW	ENG	Brett Angell (on loan from Stockport County)

No.	Pos.	Nation	Player
23	FW	ENG	Mark Robson (retired)
28	DF	ENG	Nick Fenton (on loan from Manchester City)

== Final league table ==
Pos	Team	Pld	W	D	L	GF	GA	GD	Pts	Promotion or relegation
6	Stoke City	46	23	13	10	68	42	+26	82	Qualification for the Second Division play-offs
7	Bristol Rovers	46	23	11	12	69	45	+24	80	
8	Notts County	46	18	11	17	61	55	+6	65	
9	Bristol City	46	15	19	12	59	57	+2	64	
10	Reading	46	16	14	16	57	63	−6	62	

Rules for classification: 1) Points; 2) Goal difference; 3) Goals scored

== Results ==
Notts County's score comes first

=== Legend ===
Win	Draw	Loss

=== Football League Division Two ===
Match	Date	Opponent	Venue	Result	Attendance	Scorers
1	7 August 1999	Luton Town	H	0–0	6,141	
2	14 August 1999	Colchester United	A	3–0	3,986	Hughes 5', Stallard 35', Blackmore 79'
3	21 August 1999	Scunthorpe United	H	3–0	5,506	Ramage 31', Stallard 33', 50'
4	28 August 1999	Cambridge United	A	1–1	4,329	Stallard 86'
5	3 September 1999	Wrexham	A	3–2	5,030	Darby 25', 42', Stallard 44'
6	3 September 1999	Blackpool	H	2–1	5,512	Ramage 60', Stallard 81'
7	18 September 1999	Cardiff City	A	1–2	6,568	Stallard 55'
8	25 September 1999	Bristol Rovers	H	0–2	6,197	
9	2 October 1999	Oldham Athletic	A	2–1	5,143	Darby 38', Ramage 67'
10	9 October 1999	Bury	A	3–1	3,620	Stallard 4', Blackmore 64', Owers 86'
11	16 October 1999	Wycombe Wanderers	H	2–1	5,710	Fenton 45', Richardson 49'
12	19 October 1999	Chesterfield	H	1–0	4,749	Ramage 82'
13	23 October 1999	Bristol Rovers	A	1–0	8,188	Rapley 82'
14	26 October 1999	Brentford	H	0–1	5,075	
15	3 November 1999	Stoke City	A	1–0	11,619	Dyer 23'
16	6 November 1999	Gillingham	H	1–1	6,023	Allsopp 2'
17	12 November 1999	Preston North End	A	0–2	14,226	
18	23 November 1999	Oxford United	H	0–1	4,220	
19	27 November 1999	Bristol City	H	4–4	5,374	Holland 29' (o.g.), Stallard 30', Dyer 71', Warren 85'
20	4 December 1999	Luton Town	A	2–2	5,195	Richardson 54', Owers 73'
21	11 December 1999	Bournemouth	H	5–1	4,119	Angell 1', 8', 59', Richardson 7', Stallard 42'
22	18 December 1999	Millwall	A	0–1	7,917	
23	26 December 1999	Wigan Athletic	H	0–2	8,179	
24	28 December 1999	Reading	A	0–0	7,703	
25	3 January 2000	Burnley	H	2–0	8,223	Angell 14', 62'
26	8 January 2000	Bournemouth	A	1–1	8,223	Owers 70'
27	15 January 2000	Colchester United	H	1–2	4,931	Rapley 65'
28	22 January 2000	Scunthorpe United	A	0–1	4,035	
29	5 February 2000	Brentford	A	2–0	5,106	Tierney 11', Rapley 70'
30	12 February 2000	Wrexham	H	2–1	5,474	Dyer 35', Hughes 48'
31	15 February 2000	Cambridge United	H	2–3	4,053	Owers 2', Hughes 28' (pen)
32	19 February 2000	Bristol City	A	2–2	10,029	Liburd 60', Hughes 77' (pen)
33	26 February 2000	Cardiff City	H	2–1	5,334	Hughes 80' (pen), Dyer 89'
34	4 March 2000	Blackpool	A	1–2	4,277	Stallard 59'
35	7 March 2000	Gillingham	A	1–0	6,915	Richardson 60'
36	11 March 2000	Stoke City	H	0–0	9,677	
37	18 March 2000	Oxford United	A	3–2	4,544	Dyer 14', Hughes 19', 39' (pen)
38	21 March 2000	Preston North End	H	1–0	6,401	Redmile 4'
39	25 March 2000	Wigan Athletic	A	0–2	6,094	
40	1 April 2000	Millwall	H	1–1	7,032	Darby 61'
41	8 April 2000	Burnley	A	1–2	13,022	Stallard 86'
42	15 April 2000	Reading	H	1–2	4,791	Darby 58'
43	21 April 2000	Wycombe Wanderers	A	0–2	4,369	
44	24 April 2000	Oldham Athletic	H	0–1	3,728	
45	29 April 2000	Chesterfield	A	1–2	2,455	Bolland 33'
46	6 May 2000	Bury	H	2–2	4,017	Dyer 21', Stallard 83'

=== League Cup ===
Round	Date	Opponent	Venue	Result	Attendance	Scorers
R1 1st Leg	10 August 1999	Bury	A	0–1	1,893	
R1 2nd Leg	24 August 1999	Bury	H	2–0	2,494	Blackmore 71', Ramage 83' (Pen)
R2 1st Leg	14 September 1999	Huddersfield Town	A	1–2	6,900	Ramage 18'
R2 2nd Leg	21 September 1999	Huddersfield Town	H	2–2	4,104	Blackmore 19', Darby 35'

=== FA Cup ===
Round	Date	Opponent	Venue	Result	Attendance	Scorers
R1	30 October 1999	Bournemouth	H	1–1	3,674	Rapley 17'
R1 Replay	9 November 1999	Bournemouth	A	2–4	4,226	Redmile 78', Tierney 84'

=== Football League Trophy ===
Round	Date	Opponent	Venue	Result	Attendance	Scorers
R1	7 December 1999	Blackpool	H	0–1	1,167	

== Squad statistics ==
Appearances for competitive matches only

Pos.	Name	League		FA Cup		League Cup		Football League Trophy		Total	
Pos.	Name	Apps	Goals	Apps	Goals	Apps	Goals	Apps	Goals	Apps	Goals
FW	(Australia) Daniel Allsopp	3	1	0	0	0	0	0	0	3	1
FW	(England) Brett Angell	6	5	0	0	0	0	0	0	6	5
FW	(England) Peter Beadle	1(5)	0	0	0	1(3)	0	0	0	2(8)	0
DF	(Wales) Clayton Blackmore	21	2	1	0	4	2	0(1)	0	26(1)	4
MF	(England) Paul Bolland	18(6)	1	1	0	0(3)	0	0(1)	0	19(10)	1
MF	(England) Michael Brough	11	0	0	0	0	0	0	0	11	0
FW	(England) David Cross	0(1)	0	0	0	0	0	0	0	0(1)	0
FW	(England) Duane Darby	22(6)	5	0	0	3(1)	1	0	0	26(7)	5
GK	(Republic of Ireland) Saul Deeney	0	0	0	0	0	0	0	0	0	0
DF	(England) Alex Dyer	21(10)	6	2	0	0	0	0(1)	0	23(11)	6
FW	(England) Sean Farrell	0(9)	0	0	0	0	0	0	0	0(9)	0
DF	(England) Nick Fenton	13	1	0	0	0	0	1	0	14	1
MF	(England) Ryan Ford	0(1)	0	0	0	0	0	0	0	0(1)	0
GK	(England) Paul Gibson	1	0	0	0	1	0	0	0	2	0
FW	(Republic of Ireland) Paul Heffernan	0(2)	0	0	0	0	0	0	0	0(2)	0
DF	(England) Richard Holmes	38(3)	0	2	0	3(1)	0	0	0	43(4)	0
DF	(England) Dean Howell	0(1)	0	0	0	0	0	0	0	0(1)	0
MF	(England) Andy Hughes	32(3)	7	2	0	4	0	1	0	39(3)	7
DF	(England) Richard Liburd	24(7)	1	1	0	0	0	0	0	25(7)	1
GK	(England) James Lindley	0(2)	0	0	0	0	0	0	0	0(2)	0
MF	(England) Shaun Murray	4(5)	0	1	0	1	0	0	0	6(5)	0
MF	(England) Gary Owers	45	4	1	0	3(1)	0	1	0	50(1)	0
DF	(England) Dennis Pearce	14	4	1	0	1(1)	0	1	0	17(1)	0
MF	(England) Craig Ramage	36(4)	4	1	0	4	2	0	0	41(4)	6
FW	(England) Kevin Rapley	11(17)	3	1(1)	1	0	0	1	0	13(18)	4
DF	(England) Matt Redmile	39(2)	1	1	1	4	0	1	0	45(2)	2
MF	(England) Ian Richardson	33	4	2	0	4	0	1	0	40	4
MF	(England) Mark Robson	0(2)	0	0	0	0	0	0	0	0(2)	0
FW	(England) Mark Stallard	31(5)	13	1	0	4	0	1	0	37(5)	13
MF	(England) Francis Tierney	6(6)	1	0(2)	1	0(1)	0	1	0	8(9)	2
GK	(Wales) Darren Ward	45	0	2	0	3	0	1	0	51	0
DF	(England) Mark Warren	31(2)	1	1	0	4	0	1	0	37(2)	1
FW	(England) Adam Webster	0(1)	0	0	0	0	0	0	0	0(1)	0
