= 1997–98 Notts County F.C. season =

English football team season

Notts County
1997–98 season
- Chairman: Derek Pavis
- Manager: Sam Allardyce
- Stadium: Meadow Lane
- Third Division: 1st (promoted)
- FA Cup: Third round
- League Cup: First round
- Auto Windscreens Shield: Second round
- Top goalscorer: League: Gary Jones; All: Gary Jones (28)
- Highest home attendance: 12,431
- Lowest home attendance: 3,104
- Average home league attendance: 5,710

During the 1997–98 English football season, Notts County F.C. competed in the Football League Third Division.

== Season summary ==
In the 1997–98 season Notts County secured promotion in March and finished top of the division.

== Final league table ==
Pos	Team	Pld	W	D	L	GF	GA	GD	Pts	Promotion or relegation
1	Notts County (C, P)	46	29	12	5	82	43	+39	99	Promotion to the Second Division
2	Macclesfield Town (P)	46	23	13	10	63	44	+19	82	Promotion to the Second Division
3	Lincoln City (P)	46	20	15	11	60	51	+9	75	Promotion to the Second Division
4	Colchester United (O, P)	46	21	11	14	72	60	+12	74	Qualification for the Third Division play-offs
5	Torquay United	46	21	11	14	68	59	+9	74	Qualification for the Third Division play-offs

Rules for classification: In the Football League goals scored (GF) takes precedence over goal difference (GD).
(C) Champions; (O) Play-off winners; (P) Promoted

== Results ==
Notts County's score comes first.

=== Legend ===
Win	Draw	Loss

=== Football League Second Division ===
Date	Opponent	Venue	Result	Attendance	Scorers
9 August 1997	Rochdale	H	2–1	4,173	
16 August 1997	Hull City	A	3–0	7,142	
23 August 1997	Lincoln City	H	1–2	5,707	
30 August 1997	Cardiff City	A	1–1	6,191	
2 September 1997	Hartlepool United	A	1–1	2,010	
7 September 1997	Scunthorpe	H	2–1	5,009	
13 September 1997	Mansfield Town	H	1–0	6,706	
20 September 1997	Shrewsbury	A	2–1	2,532	
27 September 1997	Scarborough	A	2–1	2,751	
4 October 1997	Darlington	H	1–1	4,428	
11 October 1997	Macclesfield Town	H	1–1	4,871	
18 October 1997	Swansea City	A	2–1	3,668	
21 October 1997	Rotherham United	A	1–1	3,161	
25 October 1997	Cambridge United	H	1–0	4,279	
1 November 1997	Barnet	A	2–1	2,530	
4 November 1997	Chester City	H	1–2	3,104	
8 November 1997	Exeter City	H	1–1	5,107	
18 November 1997	Colchester United	A	0–2	2,635	
22 November 1997	Leyton Orient	A	1–1	4,321	
29 November 1997	Peterborough United	H	2–2	8,006	
3 December 1997	Brighton and Hove Albion	A	1–0	1,239	
13 December 1997	Doncaster Rovers	H	5–2	4,024	
20 December 1997	Torquay United	A	2–0	2,536	
26 December 1997	Scunthorpe United	A	2–1	4,781	
28 December 1997	Hartlepool United	H	2–0	6,073	
10 January 1998	Rochdale	A	2–1	2,387	
17 January 1998	Cardiff City	H	3–1	6,214	
20 January 1998	Hull City	H	1–0	4,017	
24 January 1998	Lincoln City	A	5–3	6,059	
31 January 1998	Mansfield Town	A	2–0	6,786	
7 February 1998	Shrewsbury Town	H	1–1	5,790	
14 February 1998	Darlington	A	2–0	2,781	
21 February 1998	Scarborough	H	1–0	5,645	
24 February 1998	Swansea City	H	2–1	4,484	
28 February 1998	Macclesfield Town	A	0–2	5,112	
3 March 1998	Exeter City	A	5–2	2,966	
7 March 1998	Barnet	H	2–0	6,081	
14 March 1998	Chester City	A	1–0	2,753	
21 March 1998	Colchester United	H	0–0	6,284	
28 March 1998	Leyton Orient	H	1–0	8,389	
3 April 1998	Peterborough United	A	0–1	2,485	
11 April 1998	Brighton and Hove Albion	H	2–2	5,344	
13 April 1998	Doncaster Rovers	A	2–1	2,485	
18 April 1998	Torquay United	H	3–0	5,183	
25 April 1998	Cambridge United	A	2–2	4,009	
2 May 1998	Rotherham United	H	5–2	12,431	

=== FA Cup ===
Round	Date	Opponent	Venue	Result	Attendance	Goalscorers
R1	16 November 1997	Colwyn Bay	H	2–0		
R2	6 December 1997	Preston North End	A	2–2		
R2R	16 December 1997	Preston North End	H	1–2		

=== League Cup ===
Round	Date	Opponent	Venue	Result	Attendance	Goalscorers
R1 1st Leg	12 Aug 1997	Darlington	A	1–1	2,189	
R1 2nd Leg	26 Aug 1997	Darlington	H	2–1 (won 3–2 on agg)	1,925	
R2 1st Leg	16 Sep 1997	Tranmere	H	0–2	1,779	
R2 2nd Leg	23 Sep 1997	Tranmere	A	1–0 (lost 1–2 on agg)	3,287	

=== Football League Trophy ===
Round	Date	Opponent	Venue	Result	Attendance	Goalscorers
NR2	27 January 1998	Burnley	A	0–2	2,442	

== Squad ==
Note: Flags indicate national team as defined under FIFA eligibility rules; some limited exceptions apply. Players may hold more than one non-FIFA nationality.

No.	Pos.	Nation	Player
—	GK	(England) ENG	Steve Cherry
—	GK	(England) ENG	Mike Pollitt
—	GK	(Wales) WAL	Darren Ward
—	DF	(England) ENG	Ian Baraclough
—	DF	(Republic of Ireland) IRL	Steve Finnan
—	DF	(England) ENG	Ian Hendon
—	DF	(England) ENG	Graeme Hogg
—	DF	(England) ENG	Paul Mitchell
—	DF	(England) ENG	Dennis Pearce
—	DF	(England) ENG	Matt Redmile
—	DF	(England) ENG	Ian Richardson
—	DF	(England) ENG	Gary Strodder
—	MF	(England) ENG	Shaun Cunnington
—	MF	(England) ENG	Shaun Derry
—	MF	(England) ENG	Wayne Diuk

No.	Pos.	Nation	Player
—	MF	(England) ENG	Alex Dyer
—	MF	(England) ENG	Terry Henshaw
—	MF	(England) ENG	Andy Hughes
—	MF	(Australia) AUS	Ricky Otto
—	MF	(England) ENG	Adem Poric
—	MF	(Republic of Ireland) IRL	Phil Robinson
—	MF	(England) ENG	Mark Robson
—	FW	(England) ENG	Craig Dudley
—	FW	(England) ENG	Sean Farrell
—	FW	(England) ENG	Justin Jackson
—	FW	(England) ENG	Gary Jones
—	FW	(England) ENG	Andy Kiwomya
—	FW	(England) ENG	Tony Lormor
—	FW	(England) ENG	Gary Martindale
—	FW	(England) ENG	Devon White
