= Adam Webster =

Adam Webster may refer to:

- Adam Webster (footballer, born 1980), English footballer who played for Notts County
- Adam Webster (footballer, born 1995), English footballer who plays for Brighton & Hove Albion
