= St Joseph's Catholic High School, Slough =

Coordinates: 51.5192°N 0.5864°W

St. Joseph's Catholic High

Location
- Shaggy Calf Lane; Slough, Berkshire, SL2 5HW; England

Information
- Type: Academy
- Religious affiliation: Roman Catholic
- Local authority: Slough Borough Council
- Trust: St Thomas Catholic Academies Trust
- Department for Education URN: 143803 Tables
- Ofsted: Reports
- Head teacher: Kelly Riddles
- Gender: Coeducational
- Age: 11 to 18
- Enrolment: 987
- Website: www.st-josephs.slough.sch.uk

St Joseph's Catholic High School is a coeducational Roman Catholic secondary school and sixth form located in Slough, Berkshire, England.

Ofsted in their most recent (2022 MAY) report described the school, as a good school with outstanding features. The school previously held Performing Arts status.

Previously a voluntary aided school administered by Slough Borough Council, in December 2016 St Joseph's Catholic High School converted to academy status. The school is now sponsored by the St Thomas Catholic Academies Trust.

== Notable former pupils ==
- Ryan Ford, former footballer
- Lloyd Owusu, former footballer
- Matty Cash, Professional Footballer for Aston Villa and Poland
- Paul Rendall, former England Rugby Union prop.
