= 2006 FA Cup final =

English football match

2006 FA Cup Final
- Match programme cover
- Event: 2005–06 FA Cup
Liverpool	West Ham United
3	3
- After extra time Liverpool won 3–1 on penalties
- Date: 13 May 2006
- Venue: Millennium Stadium, Cardiff
- Man of the Match: Steven Gerrard (Liverpool)
- Referee: Alan Wiley (Staffordshire)
- Attendance: 71,140

The 2006 FA Cup final was a football match played between Liverpool and West Ham United on 13 May 2006 at the Millennium Stadium, Cardiff. It was the final match of the 2005-06 FA Cup, the 125th season of the world's oldest football knockout competition. Liverpool were participating in their 13th final; they had previously won six and lost six. West Ham were appearing in their fifth final, they had previously won three and lost once. This was the last final to be held at the Millennium Stadium while Wembley Stadium was rebuilt. Liverpool had won the first final to be held at the Millennium Stadium in 2001, when they beat Arsenal 2–1. The match has been called The Gerrard Final due to Liverpool captain Steven Gerrard's volleys and is widely regarded as one of the greatest cup finals in the history of the competition.

As both teams were in the highest tier of English football, the Premier League, they entered the competition in the third round. Matches up to the semi-final were contested on a one-off basis, with a replay taking place if the match ended in a draw. Liverpool's matches varied from close affairs to comfortable victories. They beat Manchester United 1–0 in the fifth round, while they won 7–0 against Birmingham City in the sixth round. The majority of West Ham's matches were close, with their only match to be decided by more than one goal being their 4–2 victory against Blackburn Rovers in the fourth round.

Watched by a crowd of 71,140, West Ham took the lead in the first half when Liverpool defender Jamie Carragher scored an own goal, and striker Dean Ashton scored a few minutes later to make it 2–0 to West Ham. Liverpool scored, courtesy of Djibril Cissé, to make the score 2–1 at half time. They equalised not long after the restart via a Steven Gerrard goal. However, ten minutes later West Ham defender Paul Konchesky gave his team a 3–2 lead. With the match in injury time, Gerrard equalised from distance to make the score 3–3 and force the game into extra time. No further goals were scored in extra time meaning the match was to be decided by a penalty shoot-out. West Ham missed three of their four penalties while Liverpool converted three of four to win the shoot-out 3–1.

The victory meant Liverpool won the FA Cup for the seventh time. They later played against league champions Chelsea in the 2006 FA Community Shield. Given Liverpool had already qualified for Europe in the UEFA Champions League via their league position, their UEFA Cup spot was awarded to runners-up West Ham.

== Route to the final ==
=== Liverpool ===
Round	Opponents	Score
3rd	Luton Town (a)	5–3
4th	Portsmouth (a)	2–1
5th	Manchester United (h)	1–0
6th	Birmingham City (a)	7–0
SF	Chelsea (n)	2–1

Liverpool entered the competition in the third round, as one of the twenty teams from the Premier League. They were drawn against Football League Championship side Luton Town, at Luton's home ground Kenilworth Road. Despite trailing 3–1 at the interval, four goals in the second half, including one from behind the halfway line by Xabi Alonso, meant Liverpool recovered to win the match 5–3 and progress to the fourth round. There, they were drawn against fellow top division club Portsmouth. The match held at Portsmouth's ground, Fratton Park, saw Liverpool take the lead in the first half when captain Steven Gerrard scored a penalty following a handball by Portsmouth defender Dejan Stefanović, and John Arne Riise scored again before half time to make it 2–0. Portsmouth got a goal back through midfielder Sean Davis in the second half, but no more goals were scored and Liverpool won 2–1 to go through to the fifth round.

Fellow Premier League team Manchester United were the opposition in the fifth round. With the match held at Liverpool's home ground Anfield, they won 1–0, courtesy of a Peter Crouch goal in the 19th minute. This was the first time in 85 years that Liverpool had defeated United in the FA Cup. Liverpool were then drawn against another Premier League team, Birmingham City in the sixth round. Liverpool took the lead in the match held at Birmingham's home ground St Andrew's in the first minute when defender Sami Hyypiä headed in, and two more goals in the first half from Crouch saw Liverpool finish the first half with a 3–0 lead. Four more goals in the second half from Fernando Morientes, Riise, Djibril Cissé and an own goal from Birmingham defender Olivier Tébily meant Liverpool won 7–0 to progress to the semi-final.

Chelsea, also of the Premier League, were the opposition in the semi-final. The match was held at Old Trafford, the home stadium of Manchester United as a neutral ground. Liverpool took the lead in the first half. Chelsea defender and captain John Terry committed a foul on Luis García, which resulted in a Liverpool free kick, from which Riise scored. They extended their lead soon after the start of the second half, when a goal by García from 20 yards (18 m), after he received the ball from a William Gallas header, gave them a 2–0 lead. Chelsea scored late in the half through striker Didier Drogba, but they were unable to achieve an equaliser and Liverpool won the match 2–1 to progress to the final.

=== West Ham United ===
Round	Opponents	Score
3rd	Norwich City (a)	2–1
4th	Blackburn Rovers (h)	4–2
5th	Bolton Wanderers (a)	0–0
5th	Bolton Wanderers (h)	2–1 (aet)
6th	Manchester City (a)	2–1
SF	Middlesbrough (n)	1–0

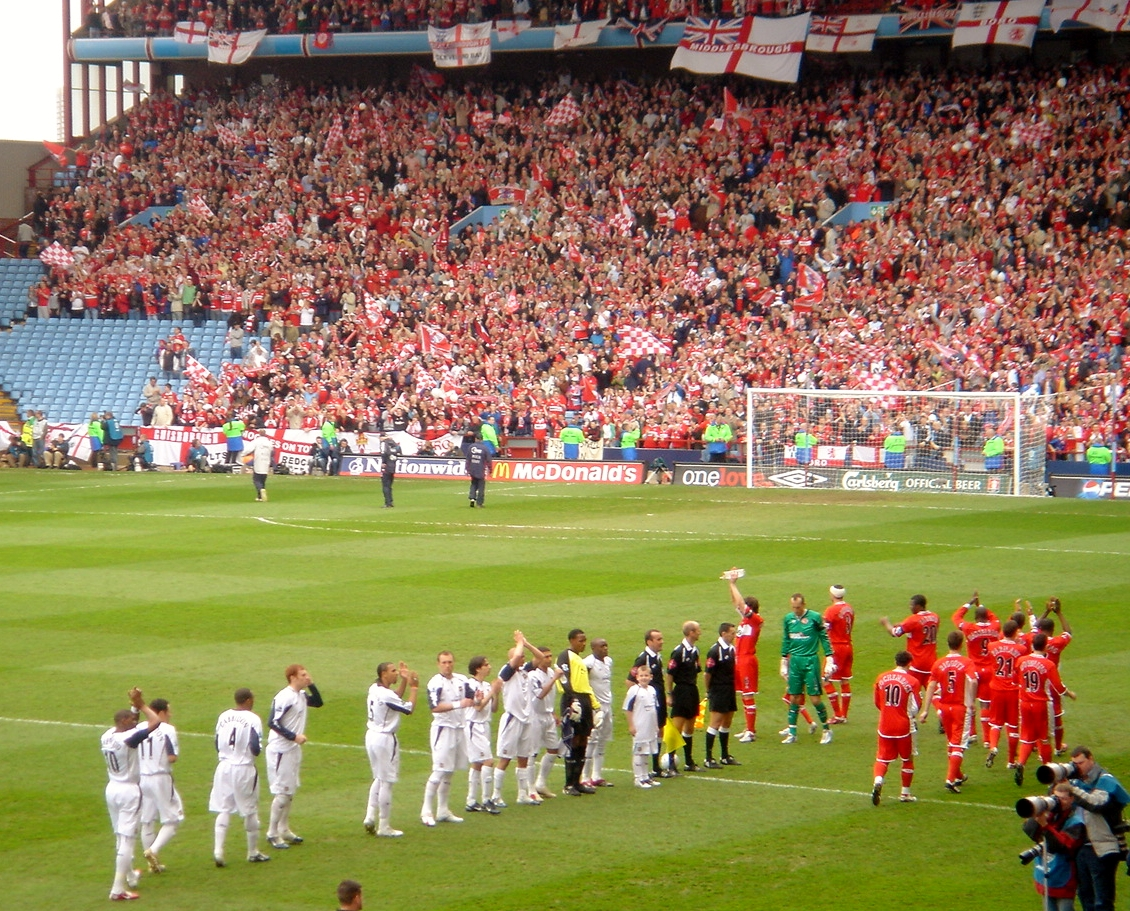
The Middlesbrough and West Ham United teams line-up before their semi-final match.

West Ham entered the competition in the third round, where they were drawn against Championship team Norwich City. Before the game Norwich's top scorer, Dean Ashton, was withdrawn from their squad amid speculation that he was about to be sold. Although the sale was denied by manager Nigel Worthington, Ashton joined West Ham soon after for £7.2 million. The match played at Norwich's home ground, Carrow Road, saw West Ham take the lead in the sixth minute through midfielder Hayden Mullins, and double it in the second half from striker Bobby Zamora. Norwich found a consolation with a Paul McVeigh penalty, but they lost 2–1 and West Ham progressed to the fourth round. Fellow Premier League team Blackburn Rovers were the opposition in the fourth round. West Ham went a goal down in the first minute when David Bentley scored, but they subsequently scored four goals from Teddy Sheringham, Matthew Etherington, Bobby Zamora and an own goal from Zurab Khizanishvili to win the match 4–2 and go through to the fifth round.

West Ham were again drawn against Premier League opposition in the fifth round, facing Bolton Wanderers away at the Reebok Stadium. It ended in a 0–0 draw, necessitating a replay. A Jussi Jääskeläinen own goal in the 10th minute gave West Ham the lead in the replay at their home ground Upton Park. Bolton equalised through striker Kevin Davies and with the score 1–1 at full time the match went to extra time. A goal from striker Marlon Harewood in the 96th minute gave West Ham a 2–1 victory and meant they progressed to the sixth round. Premier League team Manchester City were the opposition in the sixth round, and West Ham went ahead in the 41st minute when striker Dean Ashton scored. They extended their lead, in the match held at City's ground, the City of Manchester Stadium, in the 69th minute with Ashton's second of the match. A goal from Kiki Musampa in the 85th minute for City was not enough to prevent West Ham and they won 2–1 to go through to the semi-final.

Middlesbrough, also from the Premier League, were the opposition in the semi-final at the neutral venue of Villa Park in Birmingham. Before the game both players and supporters paused to remember the life of West Ham's recently deceased former manager, John Lyall. The first half saw Middlesbrough dominate, but they were unable to convert any of their chances into goals. They also lost goalkeeper Mark Schwarzer to injury. A long pass by defender Anton Ferdinand was headed down by Ashton to Harewood, whose goal ensured a 1–0 victory for West Ham and a place in the final.

== Background ==
The match was Liverpool's 13th appearance in the final. They had won on six occasions (1965, 1974, 1986, 1989, 1992, 2001) and lost six times (1914, 1950, 1971, 1977, 1988, 1996). West Ham were appearing in their fifth final, they had previously won three (1964, 1975, 1980) and lost once in the 1923 FA Cup Final. Liverpool had won both the meetings between the teams in the Premier League during the season. A 2–0 home victory at the end of October, was followed by a 2–1 win at the end of April. The latter match saw Liverpool midfielder Luis García and West Ham defender Hayden Mullins sent off, which meant they would both be suspended for the final.

A week before the final, Liverpool played Portsmouth in the 2005–06 Premier League – it was their last match before the final, and they won 3–1. The win was Liverpool's ninth straight in the competition and meant they finished the season in third place. One area of concern was the fitness of midfielder Xabi Alonso, who injured his ankle in the match and was a doubt for the final. They were also without striker Robbie Fowler, who was cup-tied after playing for Manchester City earlier in the competition. Captain Steven Gerrard was determined not to let complacency affect Liverpool; "We have beaten fantastic sides like Manchester United and Chelsea to get to the final, but it is always on your mind that after going on such a successful run you might not get over that last hurdle."

West Ham's final game before the final was against Tottenham Hotspur in the Premier League, and a 2–1 win meant they finished the season in ninth place. West Ham also had injury concerns ahead of the final, with midfielder Matthew Etherington and striker Dean Ashton both doubts to be fit for the match. However, manager Alan Pardew was optimistic they would be available for selection stating: "You expect everyone to put their life on the line for the final." Pardew was also optimistic about his team's chances in the final, despite them being considered as the underdogs: We're up against a technical team who are better than us, Liverpool have got more experience and more international players, too. But everyone also knows that we attack teams and that we've got a big punch."

The match was originally scheduled to be played on 20 May. However, England manager Sven-Göran Eriksson wanted a four-week break before the start of the 2006 FIFA World Cup, so that if any England players were involved (Liverpool's Steven Gerrard, Jamie Carragher and Peter Crouch all later made his squad) would get a decent rest before the tournament. The final was scheduled to be held at Wembley Stadium, however the stadium had fallen behind in its rebuild and would not be completed in time for the final. The final would instead be played at the Millennium Stadium in Cardiff, where it had been held since 2001. Mike Dean was originally appointed to referee the final, but questions about his impartiality were raised as he resided close to Liverpool. He was replaced by Alan Wiley.

In the week before the Final, a block of 1,600 tickets in the Liverpool supporters' seating area was stolen in the postal system. The stadium authorities refused to reissue the tickets on crowd safety grounds, and threatened to eject anyone found sitting in the block from the stadium and possibly prosecute them for receiving stolen goods. Liverpool F.C. arranged for most of the affected fans to receive tickets from an allocation that had been held back for a lottery among their supporters. The day after the final, South Wales Police seized 100 stolen tickets. Three people were arrested after 15 forged tickets were found ahead of the match.

== Match ==
=== Pre-match ===
Michael Ball sang the national anthem, "God Save the Queen", on the pitch before the game, with Lesley Garrett singing the traditional cup final hymn, "Abide with Me". Before the match, both teams received a boost as Ashton and Etherington for West Ham and Alonso for Liverpool were deemed fit enough to start the final.

=== First half ===
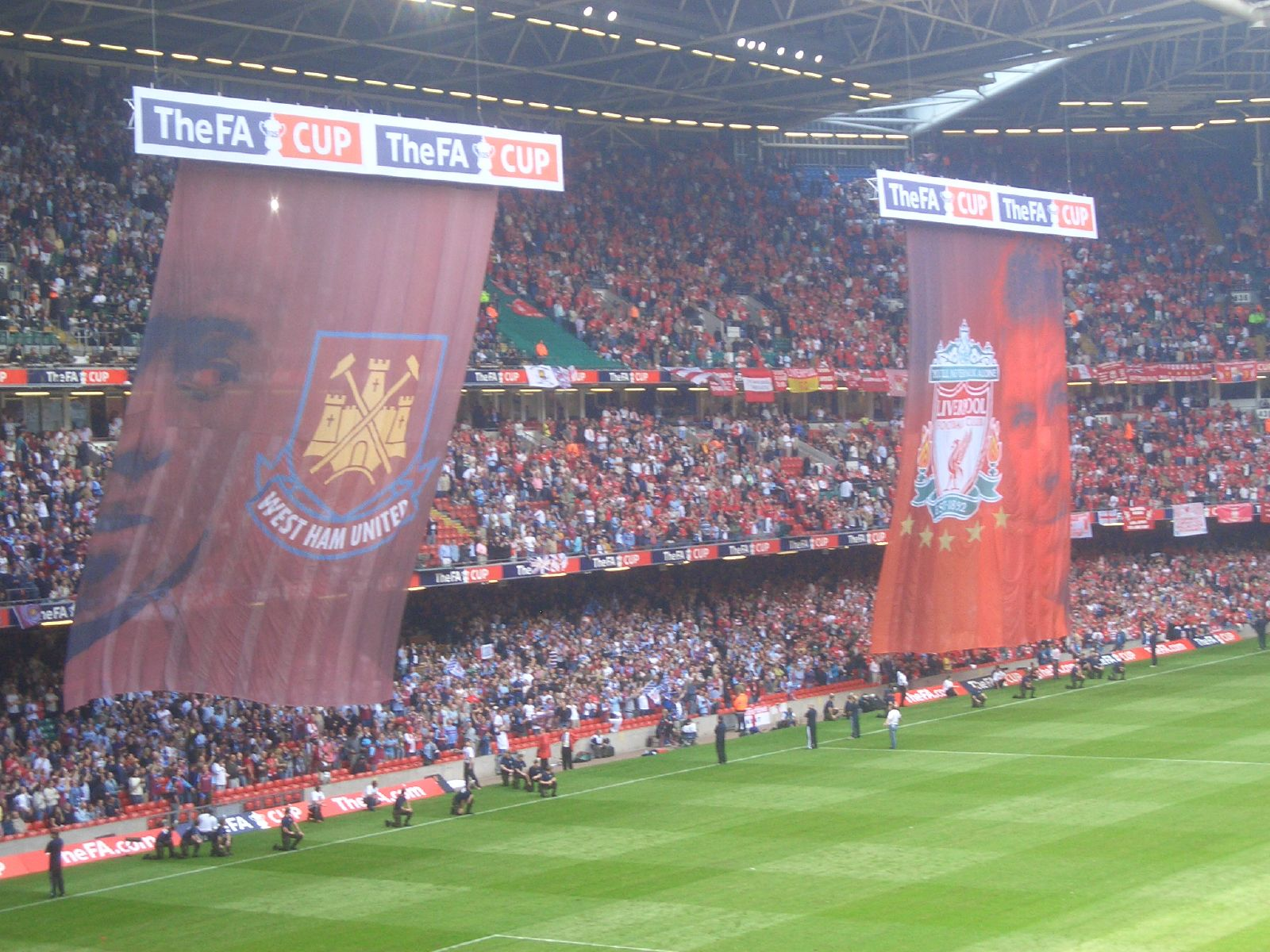
Banners of the two teams were hung from inflatable balloons before the match.

West Ham kicked the match off, as both teams lined up in a 4–4–2 formation. West Ham committed the first foul of the match in the first minute as Paul Konchesky brought down Steven Gerrard, but Liverpool were unable to capitalise on the resulting free kick. A few minutes later, West Ham midfielder Yossi Benayoun advanced down the right hand side of the pitch and passed the ball into the penalty area, but Liverpool defender Sami Hyypiä was able to intercept the ball before Ashton or Harewood received it. Harewood had the first shot on goal for West Ham in the 12th minute, but it was deflected out for a corner.

Liverpool's first opportunity came a minute later, after West Ham midfielder Carl Fletcher conceded a free kick for a foul on Gerrard. However, the resulting free kick was hit into the wall of players in front of the West Ham penalty area. A few minutes later, West Ham scored the first goal of the match; Liverpool midfielder Xabi Alonso gave the ball away to Benayoun, who played it inside to Ashton. Ashton then played a through-ball to Lionel Scaloni on the right flank, before the Argentine's low cross was put into his own goal by Liverpool defender Jamie Carragher to give West Ham a 1–0 lead. Seven minutes later, West Ham extended their lead, when Liverpool goalkeeper Pepe Reina fumbled a shot from Etherington into the path of Ashton, who squeezed the rebound under Reina into the far corner to make it 2–0. Liverpool looked to have reduced the deficit in the 30th minute, but Peter Crouch's shot from a Gerrard free kick was disallowed as Crouch was offside.

However, Liverpool did score from their next attack. Gerrard played a ball into the West Ham penalty area, which went over the head of defender Scaloni and was met by striker Djibril Cissé, who scored to make it 2–1. Ashton came close to extending West Ham's lead in the 37th minute, but his effort went wide of the post after beating goalkeeper Reina. The last chance of the half came in the 44th minute when Liverpool defender Steve Finnan sliced a clearance straight to striker Harewood, however his shot went out for a throw-in.

=== Second half ===
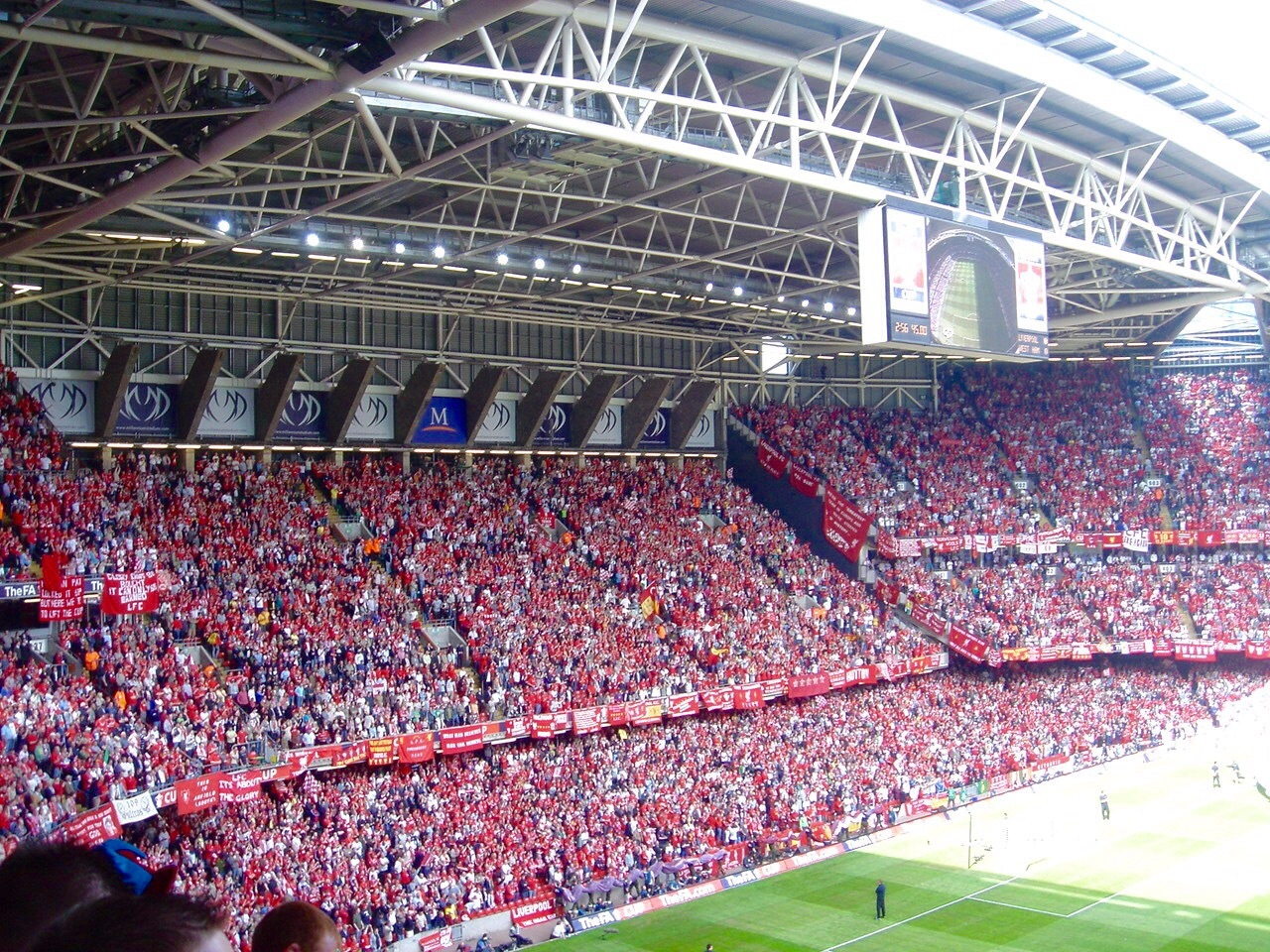
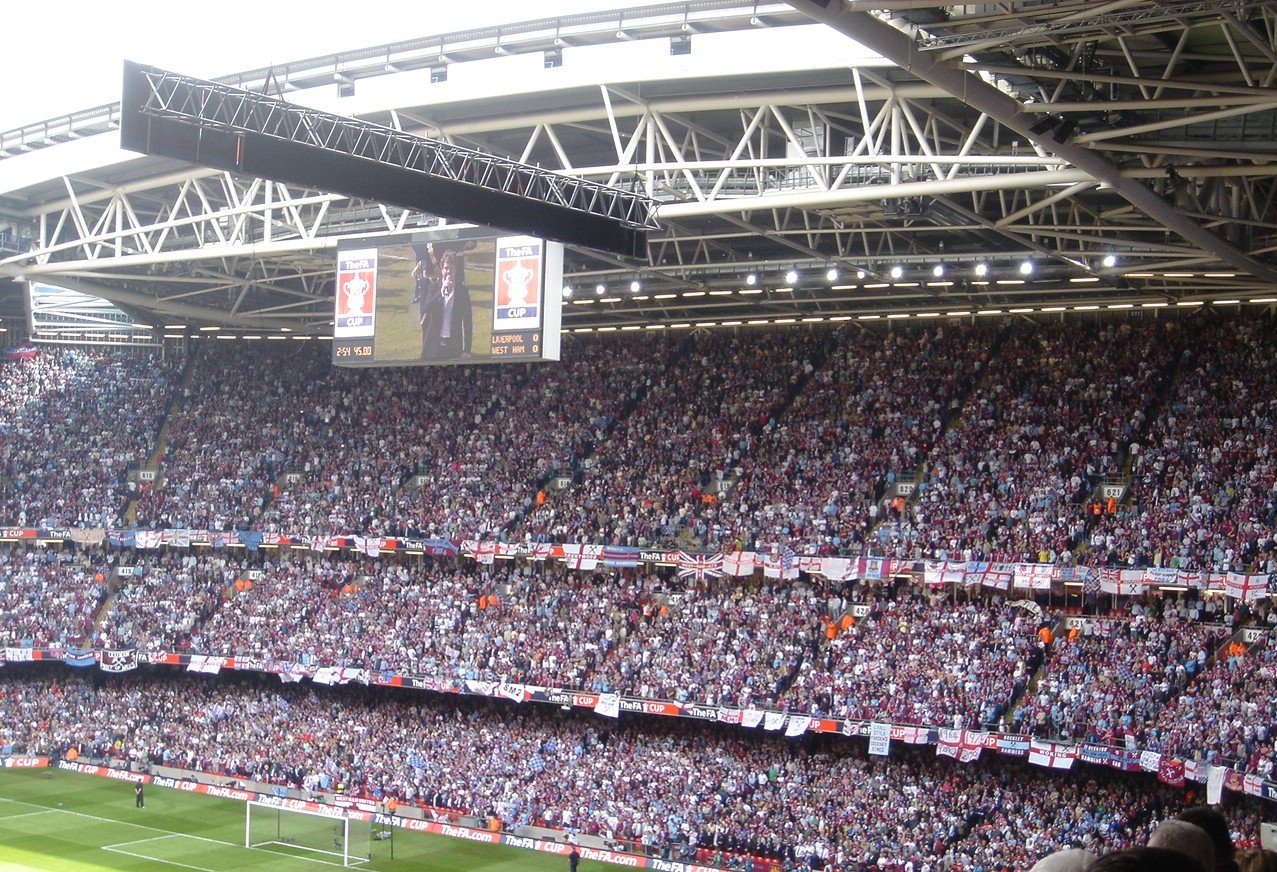
Supporters of Liverpool and West Ham during the game.

Liverpool got the second half under way, but it was West Ham who had the first attack of the half. Etherington advanced down the right hand side of the pitch and passed to Harewood, whose shot was saved by Reina, who also saved a subsequent shot from Benayoun. Liverpool had a chance immediately afterwards as Cissé passed to Alonso, but his shot was blocked and went out for a corner. A minute later, Liverpool made the first substitution of the match, as the injured Harry Kewell was replaced by Fernando Morientes. Liverpool equalised in the 54th minute, when Gerrard volleyed home a knock-down header from Crouch. The first yellow card of the match went to Ashton after he fouled Finnan in the 60th minute. Three minutes later, Carragher also received a yellow card for a foul on Ashton.

A minute later, West Ham went ahead again; defender Paul Konchesky received the ball on the left flank, and played a ball into the Liverpool penalty area, only to see it sail over goalkeeper Reina and into the goal. Three minutes later, Liverpool made another substitution, as Alonso went off with an injury to be replaced by defender Jan Kromkamp. Minutes later, West Ham captain Nigel Reo-Coker had an attempt to score, but his shot went over the Liverpool goal. West Ham subsequently made their first substitution of the match, as Ashton was replaced by fellow striker Bobby Zamora. Liverpool also replaced Crouch with midfielder Dietmar Hamann.

West Ham made their second substitution of the match in the 77th minute, as they replaced Fletcher with Christian Dailly. They also changed formation to a 4–5–1 in an attempt to hang onto their lead. Morientes headed a Cissé pass wide in the last 10 minutes as Liverpool looked to score an equaliser. West Ham made their final substitution of the match in the 85th minute, as striker Teddy Sheringham replaced Etherington. Sheringham's first involvement in the match was to concede a free kick for handball, which was subsequently put wide by Gerrard. With the match entering injury time, Liverpool's Riise played the ball into the West Ham penalty area, where it was cleared but only as far as Gerrard, 35 yards (32 m) from goal; the Liverpool captain hit the ball on the volley and it flew along a low trajectory past goalkeeper Shaka Hislop into the bottom corner of the West Ham goal. West Ham had another chance before full-time, but Konchesky's shot was saved by Reina. With the scores level at 3–3, the match went into extra time after the referee brought an end to the 90 minutes of play.

=== Extra time ===
Liverpool got the first half of extra time under way, but the start was slow as players suffered with cramp, Carragher in particular. In the 97th minute, Liverpool won a corner, which West Ham cleared to Liverpool defender John Arne Riise on the edge of the penalty area, but his shot went over the crossbar. Liverpool won another corner in the 99th minute, which was cleared by West Ham; the ball came back into the penalty area and Morientes headed down for Cissé, but he was unable to control the ball. Before the end of the half, Hyypiä had a chance to score after running past Scaloni and Harewood, but his shot went wide of the West Ham goal.

Just after the start of the second half of extra time, Liverpool had the first chance. Kromkamp advanced down the right wing, but his shot went wide of the West Ham goal. West Ham won a corner in the 109th minute, but it came to nothing as Zamora was penalised for a foul on Reina. Players continued to struggle with cramp as Gerrard, Mohamed Sissoko, Finnan and Harewood all went down in quick succession. West Ham won a free kick in the 114th minute, after Zamora was tripped by Hyypiä, but Benayoun's effort was cleared and almost resulted in a chance for Liverpool, before Morientes was tackled by Anton Ferdinand 6 yards (5.5 m) from the West Ham goal. Two minutes from the end, Hamann was booked for a foul on Zamora; the subsequent free kick was met by Reo-Coker, whose shot was turned onto the post by Reina. The ball rebounded to Harewood, but his shot went wide of the goal. Neither team scored before the end of extra time, and the referee brought the match to an end with the scores level, resulting in a penalty shoot-out.

=== Penalty shoot-out ===
The shoot-out took place at the end where the West Ham fans were seated, with Liverpool taking the first penalty. Hamann stepped up first and scored high to the right of Hislop. Zamora took the first penalty for West Ham, but his shot was saved by Reina. Hyypiä took the next penalty for Liverpool, but he also missed, as Hislop saved his shot. Substitute Sheringham took West Ham's next penalty and scored, his shot beating Reina high to his left to level the shoot-out at 1–1. Liverpool captain Gerrard took their next penalty and scored to make it 2–1, while Konchesky's shot was saved by Reina. Riise took the next penalty for Liverpool and scored to extend their lead to 3–1. Ferdinand was next and needed to score to keep West Ham in the shoot-out, but his penalty was saved by Reina, which meant Liverpool won the shoot-out 3–1 to win the FA Cup for the seventh time.

=== Details ===
13 May 2006
15:00 BST

Liverpool	3–3 (a.e.t.)	West Ham United
Cissé 32'; Gerrard 54', 90+1'	Report	Carragher 21' (o.g.); Ashton 28'; Konchesky 64'
Penalties
Hamann (penalty scored); Hyypiä (penalty missed); Gerrard (penalty scored); Riise (penalty scored)	3–1	(penalty missed) Zamora; (penalty scored) Sheringham; (penalty missed) Konchesky; (penalty missed) Ferdinand

Millennium Stadium, Cardiff
Attendance: 71,140
Referee: Alan Wiley (Staffordshire)

Liverpool	West Ham United

GK	25	(Spain) Pepe Reina
RB	3	(Republic of Ireland) Steve Finnan
CB	23	(England) Jamie Carragher	(yellow card) 62'
CB	4	(Finland) Sami Hyypiä
LB	6	(Norway) John Arne Riise
RM	8	(England) Steven Gerrard (c)
CM	14	(Spain) Xabi Alonso		(substituted off) 67'
CM	22	(Mali) Mohamed Sissoko
LM	7	(Australia) Harry Kewell		(substituted off) 48'
CF	15	(England) Peter Crouch		(substituted off) 71'
CF	9	(France) Djibril Cissé
Substitutes:
GK	1	(Poland) Jerzy Dudek
DF	2	(Netherlands) Jan Kromkamp		(substituted on) 67'
DF	21	(Mali) Djimi Traoré
MF	16	(Germany) Dietmar Hamann	(yellow card) 118'	(substituted on) 71'
FW	19	(Spain) Fernando Morientes		(substituted on) 48'
Manager:
(Spain) Rafael Benítez

GK	34	(Trinidad and Tobago) Shaka Hislop
RB	2	(Argentina) Lionel Scaloni
CB	5	(England) Anton Ferdinand
CB	4	(Wales) Danny Gabbidon
LB	3	(England) Paul Konchesky
RM	15	(Israel) Yossi Benayoun
CM	20	(England) Nigel Reo-Coker (c)
CM	6	(Wales) Carl Fletcher		(substituted off) 77'
LM	11	(England) Matthew Etherington		(substituted off) 85'
CF	10	(England) Marlon Harewood
CF	9	(England) Dean Ashton	(yellow card) 59'	(substituted off) 71'
Substitutes:
GK	23	(England) Jimmy Walker
DF	7	(Scotland) Christian Dailly		(substituted on) 77'
DF	19	(Wales) James Collins
FW	8	(England) Teddy Sheringham		(substituted on) 85'
FW	25	(England) Bobby Zamora		(substituted on) 71'
Manager:
(England) Alan Pardew

Man of the match

- Steven Gerrard (Liverpool)

Match officials

- Assistant referees:
  - Ceri Richards (Carmarthenshire)
  - Darren Cann (Norfolk)
- Fourth official: Phil Dowd (Staffordshire)

Match rules

- 90 minutes.
- 30 minutes of extra-time if necessary.
- Penalty shoot-out if scores still level.
- Five named substitutes
- Maximum of 3 substitutions.

=== Statistics ===
Statistic	Liverpool	West Ham
Total shots	19	13
Shots on target	5	8
Corner kicks	5	4
Fouls committed	13	25
Offsides	3	2
Yellow cards	2	1
Red cards	0	0

== Post-match ==
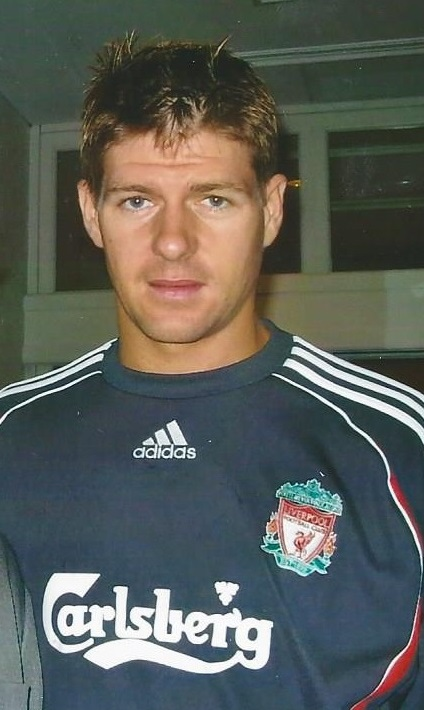
The final is remembered for the contribution of Liverpool captain Steven Gerrard

Liverpool's victory meant they won the FA Cup for the seventh time, the club's manager Rafael Benítez stated that neither side deserved to lose the match: "It was difficult to say we deserved to win or the other team. It was a magnificent final. We knew that they could score goals but that we could also. We needed to keep going but after 63 games it was really difficult." Liverpool captain Steven Gerrard also praised West Ham, stating: "West Ham were brilliant, they gave us a really good game but we had a never-say-die attitude and we stuck in there, our best chance was on penalties as we did not have any energy left." Due to the nature of the comeback, the match has come to be regarded as The Gerrard Final, teammate Peter Crouch summed up the effect Gerrard had on the match: "When the injury-time board went up we thought our chance had gone, but it is always good to have a player like Steven Gerrard in your team." A BBC Sport poll in May 2015 deemed Gerrard's goal to be the best in an FA Cup Final from the past 50 years.

West Ham manager Alan Pardew described the defeat as hard to take: "It felt like a defeat when the third goal went in. We rallied and had a great chance in extra time. We had to dig in. This was a top team we were playing, but I felt we were going to win. Only a 35-yard Gerrard smasher was going to change that. The players have been magnificent – we are proud of the way we played." Captain Nigel Reo-Coker found defeat hard to take as he felt they had done enough to win the final: "I can't describe it how I feel at the moment – gutted because I think we deserved to win this game. The players put in a fantastic effort, but it just wasn't to be for us. It was a marvellous FA Cup final and we gave all we could. I hope everyone was proud – it just wasn't our day."

Liverpool's victory set up a Community Shield match against Chelsea, winners of the 2005–06 Premier League. As FA Cup winners, Liverpool would have been awarded qualification into the UEFA Cup, but because they had qualified for the UEFA Champions League via their league position, the UEFA Cup place was passed to runners-up, West Ham.
