= Andrew Hughes (footballer, born 1978) =

English footballer and coach

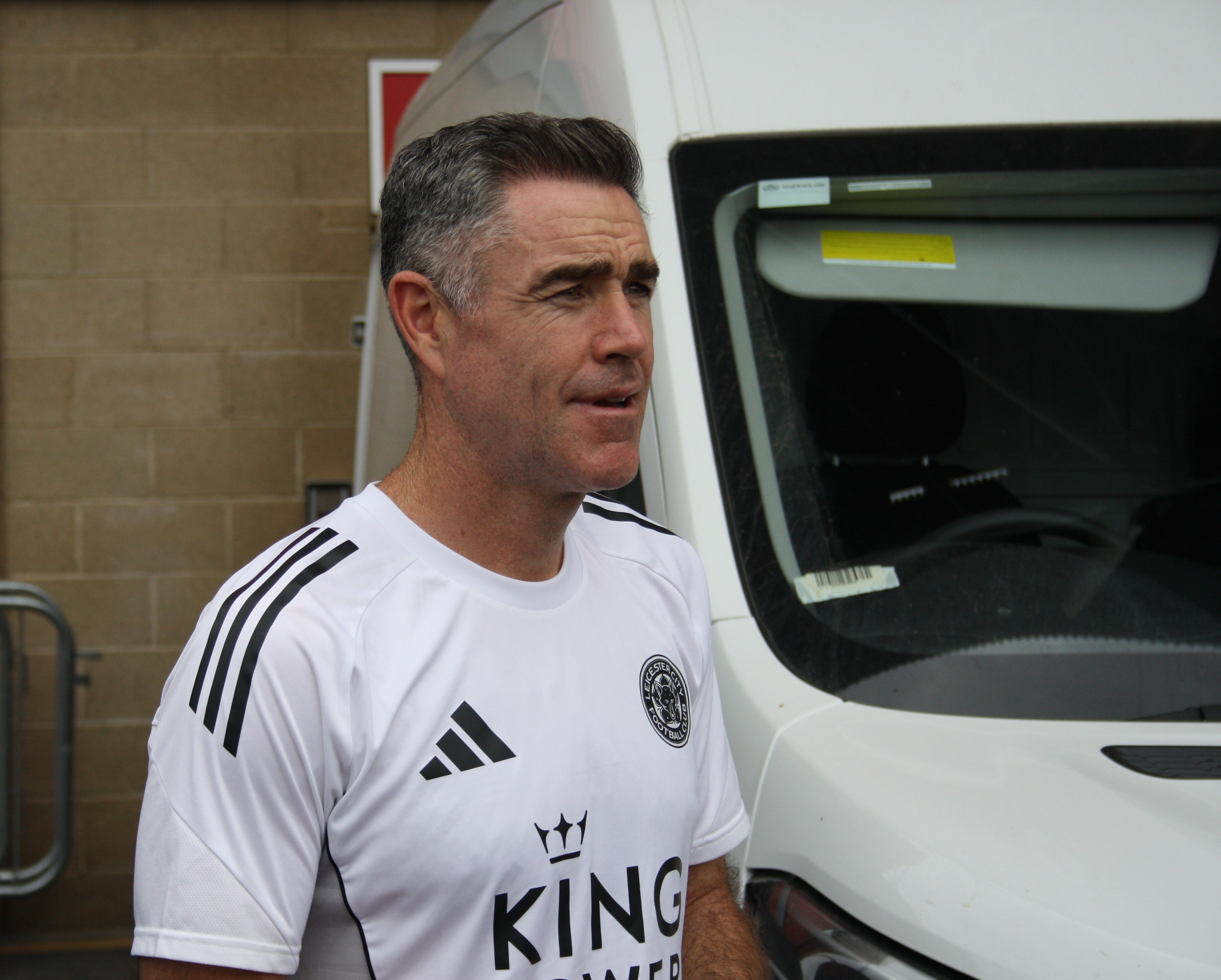
- Andrew Hughes in 2025.

Personal information
- Full name: Andrew John Hughes
- Date of birth: 2 January 1978 (age 48)
- Place of birth: Manchester, England
- Height: 5 ft 11 in (1.80 m)
- Position: Midfielder

Youth career
- –1996: Oldham Athletic

Senior career*
Years	Team	Apps	(Gls)
1996–1998	Oldham Athletic	34	(1)
1998	→ Notts County (loan)	8	(1)
1998–2001	Notts County	103	(16)
2001–2005	Reading	168	(18)
2005–2007	Norwich City	72	(2)
2007–2010	Leeds United	116	(1)
2010–2011	Scunthorpe United	19	(0)
2011–2014	Charlton Athletic	28	(0)
2014–2015	Bolton Wanderers	0	(0)
Total		548	(39)

Managerial career
- 2014: Bolton Wanderers (caretaker)
- * Club domestic league appearances and goals as of 19:35, 3 May 2014 (UTC)

Andrew John Hughes (born 2 January 1978) is an English former footballer and the set piece coach for La Liga club Athletic Club.

Known for his versatility, his main position is as a central midfielder, but he also played regularly at fullback during his career. Hughes played over 100 games for each of Notts County, Reading and Leeds United.

== Playing career ==
Hughes began his career at Oldham Athletic making 44 appearances scoring once before joining Notts County, where he made 130 appearances scoring 18 times. At Notts County Hughes helped earn them the Division Three championship.

=== Reading ===
He joined Reading on 5 July 2001 on a three-year deal as a replacement for Darren Caskey, but Notts County and Reading failed to agree a transfer fee and this was later set at around £250,000 by a tribunal. Hughes became an important player for Reading and helped earn the side promotion to the First Division of The Football League, finishing second in the Nationwide League Division Two. His earlier seasons at Reading had seen him play in his preferred midfield role and he flourished, going on to make 183 appearances and scoring 19 times.

=== Norwich ===
Hughes joined Norwich from Reading on 21 July 2005 for a fee believed to be around £500,000. He endured a tough start to his Norwich career, as his own form and that of the team was poor for much of the 2005–06 season. In 2006–07 season, new manager Peter Grant used him more as a utility player, covering on either wing or full back position. Hughes played 41 games that season.

=== Leeds United ===
Hughes moved to Leeds United on a two-year deal on 9 August 2007 for an undisclosed fee. Hughes joined Leeds the same day that the club was docked 15 points in League 1. In an interview, Hughes explained his reasons for leaving Norwich: "Dennis Wise told me the challenge and the position the club was in. He wants fighters and I felt the challenge of playing for Leeds United and Dennis Wise was too good to turn down ... The manager at Norwich told me he didn't want me to leave, but I didn't want to stay and be a squad player."

He scored his first and what turned out to be only goal for Leeds on 19 April against Millwall, tapping in from close range to finish a flowing move that Hughes had himself started on the edge of Millwall's box. His first season at Leeds saw Hughes play an important squad role by being used in a variety of positions, which saw Leeds get to the playoff final against Doncaster Rovers in League One. Leeds lost the game 1–0 and remained in League One. The following season Hughes again was played in a variety of roles, and was mainly used off the bench. Leeds after a stuttering start managed to get into the play-offs after new manager Simon Grayson rejuvenated Leeds. Leeds lost out in the semi-finals of the play-offs against Millwall after losing 2–1 on aggregate.

At Leeds, Hughes was mainly used as a utility player, playing in various positions. He started the 2009–10 season playing for Leeds at left back due to the absence of Ben Parker through injury. Hughes missed a few games himself with an injury but returned to the Leeds side playing in either full back position, eventually ousting loan signing Tony Capaldi at left back.

Hughes played for Leeds against Manchester United when Leeds won 1–0 at Old Trafford on 3 January 2010 in the FA Cup. However, Hughes picked up an injury against Manchester United and was not fit enough to be involved in the following game against Wycombe Wanderers, but returned to the line-up in the next game, against Exeter City. He played left back for Leeds when they earned a 2–2 draw against Tottenham Hotspur in the FA Cup on 23 January.

Hughes played an instrumental part as Leeds were promoted to the Football League Championship after finishing in second place in League One and thus earning automatic promotion. Of the 33 games Leeds won, Hughes started in 32 of them. On 26 May 2010, Hughes signed a new one-year deal with the club.

After being an unnamed substitute against Derby County, Hughes came on as a second-half substitute in the following game against Lincoln City. He also came on as a half time substitute in the 1–0 win against Watford where he played at left back after regular left back Fede Bessone picked up an injury. On 8 January 2011, Hughes came on as a second-half substitute and helped earn Leeds a 1–1 draw against Arsenal. Leeds were 1–0 up from a Robert Snodgrass second half penalty, before Arsenal equalised in the 90th minute when Cesc Fabregas also scored a penalty. Hughes left the club after waving goodbye to the fans after the FA Cup Replay at Elland Road against Arsenal, where he was an unused substitute.

Hughes' totemic status at Leeds was due more to his willingness to work hard in whichever position he was asked to play, his humility, and his rapport with fans and teammates, than to any exceptional football ability. The esteem he is held in by the club's fans is evident in the popular chant 'Andy Hughes is fucking brilliant', and in the continued use of a photograph of him as the website banner of fan magazine The Square Ball, even after he left the club.

=== Scunthorpe United ===
On 21 January 2011, it was announced Hughes would join Scunthorpe United on an 18-month contract.

=== Charlton Athletic ===
On 1 August 2011, Hughes was transferred from Scunthorpe to Charlton Athletic. He made his debut on 13 August 2011 after coming on as a substitute against his former club Notts County. He made 15 league appearances in the 2011–12 season, however he played his last game of the season in January in a 4–0 FA Cup loss to Premier League side Fulham after sustaining an Achilles injury while playing golf. The injury consequently needed surgery and kept him out until February the following year. After 13 months out with injury, Hughes played his first game in a 0–0 draw in a development squad match against Millwall in which he was one of three over 21 players permitted. He returned to the first team starting line-up on 30 March 2013 in the 3–2 win against Bolton Wanderers, and made his first appearance for the side since returning to the Championship. On 29 May 2013 Hughes signed a new one-year contract to stay with the club till 2014. On 7 May 2014, it was confirmed that Hughes was leaving Charlton.

== Coaching career ==
=== Bolton Wanderers ===
On 22 July 2014, Hughes joined Football League Championship club Bolton Wanderers as their Professional Development Coach. Hughes also continued his registration as a player with the Bolton squad, taking his career into a nineteenth season.

On 3 October 2014 it was announced that Hughes and fellow coach Lee Turner would take charge of Bolton in the interim following the departure of manager Dougie Freedman. In his only game in caretaker charge, Bolton lost 2–1 at home against AFC Bournemouth.

=== Rotherham United ===
In December 2015, Hughes joined fellow Championship club Rotherham United as their First Team Development Coach. He left the club in February 2016.

=== Crystal Palace ===
On 3 March 2016, he joined Crystal Palace's first team coaching setup and took his first session at the club's training ground. Hughes played for Alan Pardew while the duo were at Reading, between 2001 and 2003. Hughes had a positive impact in his short spell with the team keeping its premiership status for a record 4th consecutive season and reaching the FA cup final only to lose to Manchester United in extra time.

=== Huddersfield Town ===
On 26 May 2016, he joined Championship side Huddersfield Town as their new first-team coach, replacing the departed Mike Marsh, who joined up with the England national under-17 football team. The decision to bring Hughes in as first team coach proved yet again to be a success and have another positive impact with in the club, assisting David Wagner in gaining promotion to the Premier League and creating history in their first full season together.

When Wagner left Huddersfield by mutual consent in January 2019, Hughes stopped working with Huddersfield on a day-to-day basis and his departure, along with that of assistant head coach Christoph Bühler, was officially confirmed at the end of the 2018–19 season upon Huddersfield's relegation from the Premier League.

=== Sheffield United U23 ===
The following season Hughes was approached for his services by newly promoted Sheffield United to take the role of lead U23 coach which he accepted after turning other first team opportunities down. Hughes spent a full season in charge of the U23s learning the Sheffield United identity and tactical principles of their system under LMA manager of the year Chris Wilder and his assistant Alan Knill.

=== Sheffield Wednesday ===
On 12 August 2020, he joined Sheffield Wednesday as first team coach. He later left the club a few months later on 9 November 2020 when Garry Monk left the club.

=== Norwich City ===
Hughes has been at Norwich City since the start of 2021–2022 season as head of loans and player pathway development. Following the dismissal of Dean Smith in early January 2023 and the announcement of David Wagner as the new head coach, Hughes stepped up to assist the first team.

=== Leicester City ===
In August 2024, Hughes left Norwich City to join Premier League side Leicester City. The two clubs have reached an agreement for Hughes to join recently appointed head coach Steve Cooper at the King Power Stadium. Hughes was added to the coaching staff of the Scotland national team in August 2025.

== Career statistics ==
=== Club ===
Appearances and goals by club, season and competition
Club	Season	League			FA Cup		League Cup		FL Trophy		Play-offs		Total	
Club	Season	Division	Apps	Goals	Apps	Goals	Apps	Goals	Apps	Goals	Apps	Goals	Apps	Goals
Oldham Athletic	1995–96	First Division	15	1	3	0	0	0	—		—		18	1
Oldham Athletic	1996–97	First Division	8	0	0	0	1	0	—		—		9	0
Oldham Athletic	1997–98	Second Division	10	0	1	0	1	0	1	0	—		13	0
Oldham Athletic	Total		33	1	4	0	2	0	1	0	0	0	40	1
Notts County	1997–98	Third Division	15	0	0	0	0	0	0	0	—		15	0
Notts County	1998–99	Second Division	30	0	3	0	1	0	1	0	—		35	0
Notts County	1999–2000	Second Division	35	7	2	0	4	0	1	0	—		42	7
Notts County	2000–01	Second Division	30	5	5	2	2	1	0	0	—		37	8
Notts County	Total		110	12	10	2	7	1	2	0	0	0	129	15
Reading	2001–02	Second Division	39	6	2	0	0	0	1	0	—		42	6
Reading	2002–03	First Division	43	9	1	0	1	0	—		2	0	47	9
Reading	2003–04	First Division	43	3	1	0	4	0	—		—		48	3
Reading	2004–05	Championship	41	0	3	0	2	0	—		—		46	0
Reading	Total		166	18	7	0	7	0	1	0	2	0	183	18
Norwich City	2005–06	Championship	36	2	0	0	2	0	—		—		38	2
Norwich City	2006–07	Championship	36	0	3	0	2	0	—		—		41	0
Norwich City	Total		72	2	3	0	4	0	0	0	0	0	79	2
Leeds United	2007–08	League One	40	1	1	0	0	0	0	0	2	0	43	1
Leeds United	2008–09	League One	27	0	2	0	2	0	1	0	0	0	32	0
Leeds United	2009–10	League One	39	0	5	0	3	0	4	0	—		51	0
Leeds United	2010–11	Championship	10	0	1	0	2	0	—		—		13	0
Leeds United	Total		116	1	9	0	7	0	51	0	2	0	139	1
Scunthorpe United	2010–11	Championship	19	0	0	0	0	0	—		—		19	0
Charlton Athletic	2011–12	League One	15	0	2	0	2	0	1	0	—		20	0
Charlton Athletic	2012–13	Championship	6	0	0	0	0	0	—		—		6	0
Charlton Athletic	2013–14	Championship	7	0	1	0	0	0	—		—		8	0
Charlton Athletic	Total		28	0	3	0	2	0	1	0	0	0	34	0
Career Total			515	35	33	2	27	1	12	0	4	0	591	37

=== Managerial ===
As of 4 October 2014

Team	Nat	From	To	Record				
Team	Nat	From	To	G	W	D	L	Win %
Bolton Wanderers (caretaker)	England	3 October 2014	12 October 2014	1	0	0	1	0.00

== Honours ==
Notts County

- Football League Third Division: 1997–98

Reading

- Football League Second Division second-place promotion: 2001–02

Leeds United

- Football League One second-place promotion: 2009–10

Charlton Athletic

- Football League One: 2011–12

Individual

- Leeds United Chairman's Special Award: 2007–08
- Leeds United Best Contribution to the Community: 2008–09
