= Mohamed Sissoko =

Footballer (born 1985)

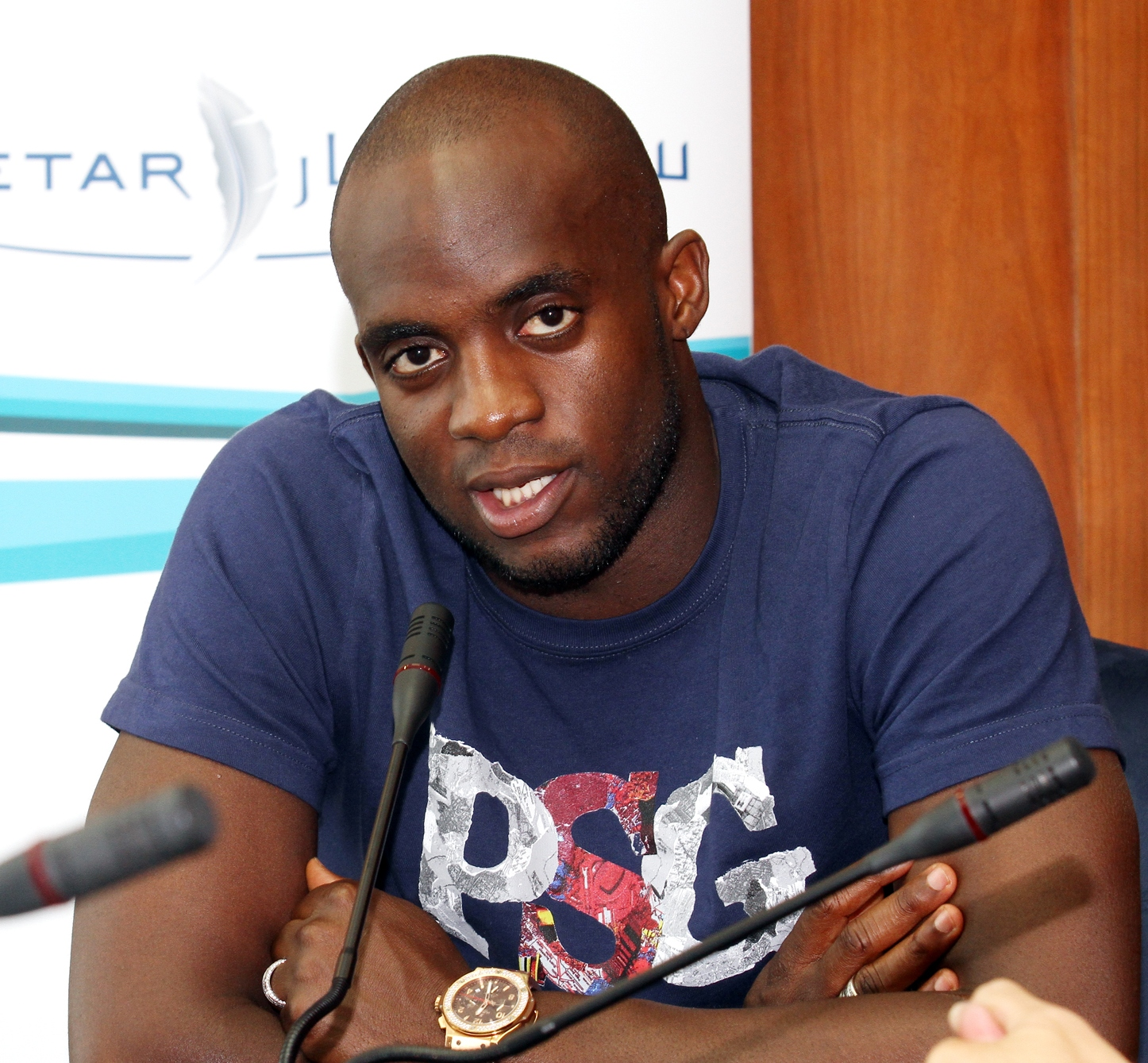
- Sissoko in 2012

Personal information
- Full name: Mohamed Lamine Sissoko
- Date of birth: 22 January 1985 (age 41)
- Place of birth: Mont-Saint-Aignan, France
- Height: 1.91 m (6 ft 3 in)
- Position: Defensive midfielder

Youth career
- Troyes
- 1998–2002: Auxerre

Senior career*
Years	Team	Apps	(Gls)
2002–2003	Auxerre	0	(0)
2003–2005	Valencia	45	(0)
2005–2008	Liverpool	51	(1)
2008–2011	Juventus	71	(3)
2011–2013	Paris Saint-Germain	28	(2)
2013	→ Fiorentina (loan)	5	(0)
2013–2015	Levante	31	(0)
2015	Shanghai Shenhua	10	(1)
2016	Pune City	13	(2)
2017	Ternana	1	(0)
2017	Mitra Kukar	26	(5)
2017–2018	Atlético San Luis	13	(1)
2018	Kitchee	3	(0)
2019	Sochaux	13	(0)
Total		310	(15)

International career
2003–2013	Mali	34	(2)
Medal record
Men's football
Representing Mali
Africa Cup of Nations
Third place	2013
- * Club domestic league appearances and goals

Mohamed Lamine "Momo" Sissoko (born 22 January 1985) is a former professional footballer who played as a defensive midfielder. He represented France, the country of his birth, at various youth levels before switching his international allegiance to Mali.

== Club career ==
=== Valencia ===
In 2003, Sissoko left boyhood club Auxerre on a free transfer to Rafael Benítez's Valencia. He was part of the 2003–04 La Liga-winning squad and became a UEFA Cup champion that same year. The following year, Benítez went to Liverpool and was replaced by Claudio Ranieri.

=== Liverpool ===
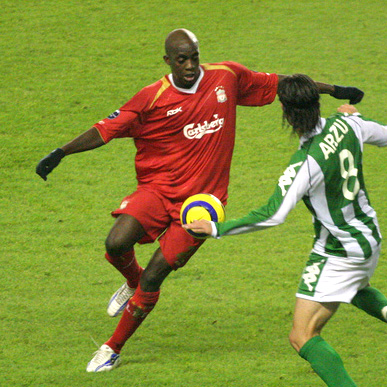
Sissoko playing for Liverpool in 2005

Sissoko rejoined Benítez at Liverpool for £5.6 million in the summer of 2005 and made his first appearance in a UEFA Champions League qualifying tie against FBK Kaunas on 26 July. In February 2006, he injured his eye after colliding with Benfica midfielder Beto.

Sissoko was part of the FA Cup winning side in 2006 and played an integral role for the team. In the summer of 2007, Sissoko rejected offers from Barcelona, CSKA Moscow and Juventus to stay on Merseyside. His only goal for Liverpool came on 25 August 2007, a low shot from twenty yards out against Sunderland in a 2–0 away win.

=== Juventus ===
In January 2008, Sissoko transferred to Italian club Juventus, where he would team up with former coach Claudio Ranieri, for a fee of €11 million. He made his first appearance for the club in February 2008, coming in as a 67th minute substitution for Tiago in a Serie A fixture versus Cagliari. Sissoko scored his first goal for Juventus on 2 March 2008, the equaliser against Fiorentina. During the first half of the 2008–09 season, he regularly featured in the starting line-up, forming a partnership with youngster Claudio Marchisio as the centre midfield pair in Claudio Ranieri's 4–4–2 formation. His season ended early after he broke his foot in March 2009, ruling him out for the rest of that season and into the start of the 2009–10 season.

Sissoko's injury problems continued throughout the rest of the 2009–10 season and into 2010–11 season, as he suffered thigh strains, a leg strain, Achilles tendon inflammation, and finally season-ending knee surgery in March 2011.

=== Paris Saint-Germain ===
On 28 July 2011, Sissoko moved to Ligue 1 side Paris Saint-Germain for a transfer fee of €7 million, plus €1 million if they qualified for the Group Stage of the UEFA Champions League before September 2013. Sissoko scored his first goal for PSG in November, when he headed in a cross from Nenê, in a 1–1 draw against Bordeaux at the Stade Chaban Delmas. In April 2012, he captained the squad against rivals Marseille in Le Classique, but was sent off in the 86th minute for two bookable offences in a game that finished 2–1 to the Parisian club.

On 30 January 2013, Sissoko joined Fiorentina on loan.

On 3 September 2013, Sissoko left PSG by mutual consent.

=== Later years ===
On 30 January 2014, Sissoko joined La Liga side Levante on a six-month deal after spending nearly five months without a club. On 25 June 2015, he was transferred to Chinese Super League side Shanghai Shenhua, and was released on 21 February 2016.

On 1 October 2016, he joined Indian Super League franchise Pune City as a marquee player. On 17 February 2017, he joined Italian club Ternana on a six-month contract, but terminated his contract just 25 days later.

On 13 April 2017, he joined Indonesian club side Mitra Kukar on a one-year contract. On 2 December 2017, Sissoko switched to Mexican club Atlético San Luis.

On 4 July 2018, Sissoko moved to Hong Kong Premier League club Kitchee on a one-year deal. Less than four months later, he terminated his contract in order to care for his father in France.

On 16 January 2019, he signed a six-month contract with Sochaux.

In January 2020, Sissoko announced his retirement as a player.

== International career ==
Born in Mont-Saint-Aignan, France, Sissoko represented France at youth level. He was eligible to play for the France national team but opted to play international football for his ancestral country, Mali. He obtained his first international call-up to the Mali national team in 2004, and appeared for his country in almost all African Cup of Nations qualifiers and tournaments since then. He also featured in FIFA World Cup qualifiers for both 2006 and 2010. Sissoko made 34 official appearances for Mali, and scored 2 goals. With Mali, he finished fourth in the 2004 African Cup of Nations, and third in the 2013 African Cup of Nations.

== Style of play ==
Originally a forward in the youth system of Auxerre, Sissoko gained prominence as a combative and physically strong defensive midfielder.

Nicknamed "La Piovra" (The Octopus) at Juventus for his physique, Sissoko excelled as a ball winner, a role which allowed him to support his more offensive midfield teammates defensively by laying off the ball to them after winning back possession. His style of play bore many similarities with French icon Patrick Vieira.

== Personal life ==
Sissoko is the nephew of former African Footballer of the Year Salif Keita, who, like him, played for both Mali and Valencia. He and another defensive midfielder, Seydou Keita, are first cousins, as Salif is Seydou's uncle.

Sissoko is also the elder brother of Abdoul Sissoko and a cousin of Malian international goalkeeper Oumar Sissoko.

== Career statistics ==
=== Club ===
Appearances and goals by club, season and competition
Club	Season	League			National cup		League cup		Continental		Other		Total	
Club	Season	Division	Apps	Goals	Apps	Goals	Apps	Goals	Apps	Goals	Apps	Goals	Apps	Goals
Auxerre	2002–03	Ligue 1	0	0	0	0	0	0	—		—		0	0
Valencia	2003–04	La Liga	21	0	4	0	—		9	1	—		34	1
Valencia	2004–05	La Liga	24	0	0	0	—		5	0	—		29	0
Valencia	Total		45	0	4	0	0	0	14	1	—		63	1
Liverpool	2005–06	Premier League	26	0	6	0	0	0	11	0	3	0	46	0
Liverpool	2006–07	Premier League	16	0	0	0	2	0	9	0	—		27	0
Liverpool	2007–08	Premier League	9	1	0	0	2	0	3	0	—		14	1
Liverpool	Total		51	1	6	0	4	0	23	0	3	0	87	1
Juventus	2007–08	Serie A	15	1	0	0	—		0	0	—		15	1
Juventus	2008–09	Serie A	21	2	3	0	—		8	0	—		32	2
Juventus	2009–10	Serie A	17	0	1	0	—		6	0	—		24	0
Juventus	2010–11	Serie A	18	0	1	0	—		10	0	—		29	0
Juventus	Total		71	3	5	0	—		24	0	—		100	3
Paris Saint-Germain	2011–12	Ligue 1	25	2	0	0	0	0	3	0	—		28	2
Paris Saint-Germain	2012–13	Ligue 1	3	0	0	0	1	0	3	0	—		7	0
Paris Saint-Germain	Total		28	2	0	0	1	0	6	0	—		35	2
Fiorentina (loan)	2012–13	Serie A	5	0	0	0	—		—		—		5	0
Levante	2013–14	La Liga	10	0	0	0	—		—		—		10	0
Levante	2014–15	La Liga	21	0	0	0	—		0	0	—		21	0
Levante	Total		31	0	0	0	0	0	0	0	—		31	0
Shanghai Shenhua	2015	Chinese Super League	10	1	5	0	—		—		—		15	1
Pune City	2016	Indian Super League	13	2	—		—		—		—		13	2
Ternana	2016–17	Serie B	1	0	—		—		—		—		1	0
Mitra Kukar	2017	Liga 1	26	5	—		—		—		—		26	5
Atlético San Luis	2017–18	Ascenso MX	13	1	1	0	—		—		—		14	1
Kitchee	2018–19	Hong Kong Premier League	3	0	0	0	—		—		1	0	4	0
Sochaux	2018–19	Ligue 2	13	0	0	0	0	0	—		—		13	0
Career total			310	15	16	0	5	0	67	1	4	0	402	16

=== International ===
Appearances and goals by national team and year
National team	Year	Apps	Goals
Mali	2003	1	0
Mali	2004	10	1
Mali	2005	3	1
Mali	2006	3	0
Mali	2007	2	0
Mali	2008	7	0
Mali	2009	0	0
Mali	2010	2	0
Mali	2011	0	0
Mali	2012	0	0
Mali	2013	6	0
Total		34	2

Scores and results list Mali's goal tally first, score column indicates score after each Sissoko goal

List of international goals scored by Mohamed Sissoko
No.	Date	Venue	Opponent	Score	Result	Competition
1	26 January 2004	Stade 15 Octobre, Bizerte, Tunisia	Kenya	1–0	3–1	2004 African Cup of Nations
2	3 September 2005	Stade du 26 Mars, Bamako, Mali	Congo	2–0	2–0	2006 FIFA World Cup qualification

== Honours ==
Valencia

- La Liga: 2003–04
- UEFA Cup: 2003–04
- UEFA Super Cup: 2004

Liverpool

- FA Cup: 2005–06
- FA Community Shield: 2006
- UEFA Super Cup: 2005
- FIFA Club World Championship runner-up: 2005

Paris Saint-Germain

- Ligue 1: 2012–13

Mali

- Africa Cup of Nations bronze: 2013

Individual

- Community Shield Man of the Match: 2006
