= Steve Finnan =

Irish footballer (born 1976)

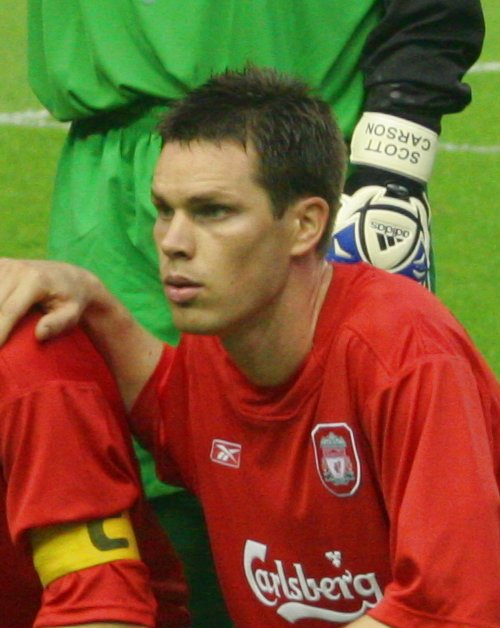
- Finnan with Liverpool in 2005

Personal information
- Full name: Stephen John Finnan
- Date of birth: 24 April 1976 (age 50)
- Place of birth: Limerick, Ireland
- Height: 1.83 m (6 ft 0 in)
- Position: Right-back

Youth career
- 1990–1993: Wimbledon

Senior career*
Years	Team	Apps	(Gls)
1993–1995	Welling United	41	(1)
1995–1996	Birmingham City	15	(1)
1996	→ Notts County (loan)	17	(2)
1996–1998	Notts County	80	(5)
1998–2003	Fulham	172	(7)
2003–2008	Liverpool	145	(1)
2008–2009	Espanyol	4	(0)
2009–2010	Portsmouth	21	(0)
Total		495	(17)

International career
2000–2008	Republic of Ireland	53	(2)
- * Club domestic league appearances and goals

Stephen John Finnan (born 24 April 1976) is an Irish former professional footballer who played as a right-back. He is the only player to have played in the FIFA World Cup, UEFA Champions League, UEFA Cup, UEFA Intertoto Cup, Premier League, all three levels of the Football League, and non-League.

A right-back, Finnan was known for his attacking role and his ability to cross the ball. Among the honours he won during his career were the UEFA Champions League in 2005 and the FA Cup in 2006 with Liverpool.

Finnan has 52 caps for the Republic of Ireland, scoring twice. He represented them at the 2002 FIFA World Cup.

== Club career ==
=== Early career ===
Finnan was born in the Janesboro area of Limerick, and moved to Chelmsford, England, at a young age. He began his career playing in Wimbledon's youth system, but he joined non-League club Welling United in 1993 after being released at the age of 16. Finnan turned professional when he signed with Birmingham City in 1995, who paid a fee of £100,000 to Welling United to acquire his services. He scored his first professional goal against Watford on 23 September 1995.

=== Notts County ===
Finnan made a loan switch to Notts County in March 1996, making his debut in a 2–1 victory over Walsall and scoring his first goal a month later in a 4–2 victory over Bristol Rovers. He appeared in all of Notts' games for the remainder of the season, helping the team finish fourth in the Second Division and qualify for the promotion play-offs. In the first-leg of the semi-finals held at the Alexandra Stadium he scored against Crewe Alexandra, with the match ending 2–2. The return-leg at home saw Notts win 1–0, winning 3–2 on aggregate. In the play-off final against Bradford City at Wembley Stadium, Notts County lost 2–0. He returned to Birmingham following the conclusion of the loan deal.

During the following 1996–97 season, Notts County signed Finnan for a fee £300,000 on 30 October 1996. He played his first match as a permanent player for Notts County after being introduced as a substitute against Shrewsbury Town. The season was not a successful one for Finnan as Notts County finished 24th and were relegated to the Third Division.

In the 1997–98 season, his first full season at the club, Finnan established himself as a key member of the club and was an ever present, appearing in 51 matches, helping the club win the Third Division title with record points and time. The other notable record Finnan established with Notts County during this season was a streak of 10 consecutive victories; a club record and one which still stands today.

=== Fulham ===
After strong showings for Notts County in the 1997–98 season, Fulham manager Kevin Keegan paid £600,000 for his services in November 1998. He made his Fulham debut against Chesterfield on 21 November 1998 and scored his first goal for Fulham against Blackpool on 20 March 1999. While at Fulham, he also became a favourite among the fans. His first season with the club was a success, with Fulham winning the Second Division championship and being promoted to the First Division.

Finnan and Fulham finished ninth the following season under new manager Paul Bracewell, despite promising early season form and an unbeaten run lasting over two months. Bracewell was replaced with Jean Tigana in May 2000, and under him in the 2000–01 season, Fulham won the First Division championship, winning promotion to the Premier League, with Finnan appearing in all but one of the league matches.

In the 2001–02 season his debut season in the Premier League, he helped Fulham qualify for the UEFA Intertoto Cup, and was voted into the Professional Footballers Association Team of the Year and was also voted as Fulham's Player of the Year. Fulham then went on to win the UEFA Intertoto Cup, giving Finnan his first taste of European football. Next season saw Jean Tigana replaced by Chris Coleman, Finnan's fourth manager in five seasons. By April 2003 with a few matches to go, Fulham were close to the relegation zone but picked up 10 points out of a possible 15 to stay in the top-flight, finishing in 14th place.

In the summer of 2003 Finnan found himself courted by many of England's top clubs, and eventually Fulham agreed to sell Finnan to Liverpool for a fee of £3.5m.

=== Liverpool ===
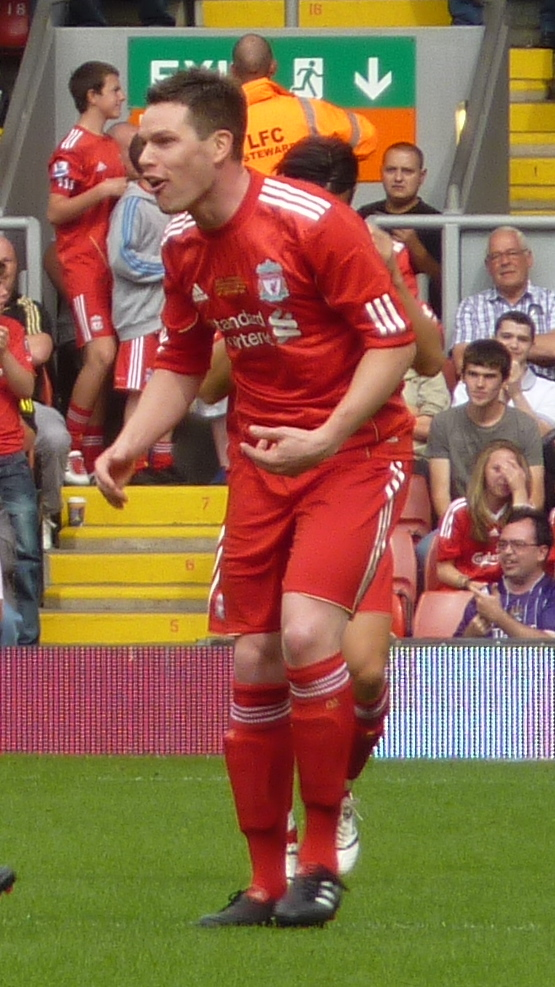
Finnan during Jamie Carragher's testimonial match in 2010

Finnan made his Liverpool debut against Chelsea on 17 August 2003. His first season was disrupted by injury, but in the 2004–05 season, he established himself as the first-choice right-back and a firm fan favourite. The season was a highly successful one for Finnan. He scored his first and only goal for Liverpool in a 3–0 win against West Bromwich Albion in the Premier League, He also played in the League Cup final, and was in the starting eleven as Liverpool won the UEFA Champions League final, though a thigh injury meant he was substituted at half-time. Finnan's goal against West Bromwich Albion meant that he became only the second player to score in each of the five highest divisions of English football; the first was Jimmy Willis.

In the 2005–06 season, Liverpool broke their record for number of points in a Premier League season, finishing on 82 points with Finnan being ever present. At the end of the season he picked up another medal with Liverpool, winning the FA Cup.

Finnan played for Liverpool as first-choice right-back for the 2006–07 season despite heavy competition from winter signing Álvaro Arbeloa. He started in the UEFA Champions League final against Milan and was subbed off after 88 minutes, Liverpool went on to lose the match 2–1. On 2 August 2007, Finnan signed a new two-year contract to remain with Liverpool until 2009.

In the 2007–08 season, Liverpool's success continued as they finished fourth in the Premier League and reached the semi-finals of the UEFA Champions League. Finnan took his total appearances for Liverpool past the 200 mark and also made it into the top 100 capped Liverpool players of all-time. Finnan made 35 appearances that season, but lost his starting position, with manager Rafael Benítez often preferring Álvaro Arbeloa to start. In the summer of 2008, following the arrival of Philipp Degen from Borussia Dortmund, Finnan was linked with a move away from Anfield. He was offered by Liverpool as a makeweight in a deal to sign Gareth Barry from Aston Villa; the defender accepted the move but the clubs were unable to agree a fee. He made a guest appearance in Jamie Carragher's testimonial match on 7 September 2010.

=== Espanyol ===
On 1 September 2008, Finnan signed a two-year contract with La Liga club Espanyol for an undisclosed fee. Injuries limited his first-team appearances, and rumours of a return to the Premier League in the January 2009 transfer window with Arsenal or Tottenham Hotspur were dismissed by Espanyol's sports director Paco Herrera and manager Mané, who considered Finnan as an important member of the club. By mid-January, Espanyol were "surprised" that a move to Hull City did not proceed, apparently for medical reasons. On 27 July 2009, Espanyol and Finnan agreed to terminate the remainder of his contract.

=== Portsmouth ===
Finnan signed a one-year contract with Premier League club Portsmouth on 31 July 2009. He made his debut for the club on 3 October in a 1–0 win against Wolverhampton Wanderers, and played regularly in the second-half of the season, but with the club in administration and relegated to the Championship, he was not offered a new contract. His final appearance for the club was in the FA Cup final against Chelsea.

== International career ==
A Republic of Ireland under-21 international, Finnan made his debut for the senior side on 26 April 2000, against Greece. He cemented his place in the starting eleven during the 2002 FIFA World Cup qualification matches, supplying the cross for Jason McAteer to score the only goal in a crucial 1–0 win against the Netherlands on 1 September 2001.

Finnan appeared in all three of Ireland's group matches at the 2002 FIFA World Cup against Cameroon, Germany and Saudi Arabia. Ireland progressed to the Round of 16 of the tournament for only the third time in their history where they faced Spain. The match ended 1–1 in extra-time and went to penalties. Finnan took a penalty and scored, but Ireland eventually lost the shootout 3–2.

Injury disrupted Finnan's participation in the unsuccessful attempt to reach the Euro 2004 finals. He was a regular starter in the 2006 FIFA World Cup qualification matches but Ireland failed to qualify for the finals.

He was again a regular starter in the Euro 2008 qualification matches but Ireland did not qualify for the finals. He scored his second international goal in the group match against Cyprus in a 1–1 draw. He announced his retirement from international football on 22 January 2008 after making 50 appearances for the Republic of Ireland. Tempted by the prospect of working with the newly appointed Ireland manager Giovanni Trapattoni, Finnan came out of retirement in August 2008 to be included in the squad to face Norway in an international friendly.

== Personal life ==
Finnan was arrested on suspicion of dangerous driving on 14 June 2005, after his Range Rover ran over an 81-year-old man from Liverpool, who later died of his injuries. Finnan faced no charges over the man's death, despite his vehicle travelling at 58mph in a 30mph zone. Finnan later expressed his sympathy to the man's family.

In May 2015, Finnan was living in London and working in property development.

On 4 December 2023, the High Court struck out a £6 million professional-negligence claim brought by Finnan against law firm Charles Russell Speechlys in relation to advice over a property dispute with his brother.

On 20 August 2024, he unsuccessfully challenged a costs judgment ordering him to pay around £120,000 to another former firm of solicitors.

On 18 November 2025, UK legal and news outlets reported that Finnan had become the subject of a bankruptcy petition in the Central London County Court, based on an unpaid five-figure costs order arising from the same dispute, and that a High Court judge later described his attempt to appeal directions in the petition as "totally without merit" and "completely hopeless".

== Career statistics ==
=== Club ===
Appearances and goals by club, season and competition
Club	Season	League			National Cup		League Cup		Other		Total	
Club	Season	Division	Apps	Goals	Apps	Goals	Apps	Goals	Apps	Goals	Apps	Goals
Welling United	1993–94	Football Conference	22	0			–				22	0
Welling United	1994–95	Football Conference	19	1			–				19	1
Welling United	Total		41	1			–				41	1
Birmingham City	1995–96	First Division	12	1	0	0	4	0	3 (Note: Appearances in Anglo-Italian Cup)	0	19	1
Birmingham City	1996–97	First Division	3	0	0	0	–		–		3	0
Birmingham City	Total		15	1	0	0	4	0	3	0	22	1
Notts County (loan)	1995–96	Second Division	17	2	–		–		3 (Note: Appearances in Football League play-offs)	1	20	3
Notts County	1996–97	Second Division	23	0	4	0	–		1 (Note: Appearance(s) in Football League Trophy)	0	28	0
Notts County	1997–98	Third Division	44	5	3	1	4	0	0	0	51	6
Notts County	1998–99	Second Division	13	0	0	0	0	0	–		13	0
Notts County	Total		97	7	7	1	4	0	4	1	112	9
Fulham	1998–99	Second Division	22	2	4	0	–		1	0	27	2
Fulham	1999–2000	First Division	36	2	4	1	6	0	–		46	3
Fulham	2000–2001	First Division	45	2	1	0	2	0	–		48	2
Fulham	2001–02	Premier League	38	0	6	0	3	0	–		47	0
Fulham	2002–03	Premier League	32	0	3	0	1	0	5 (Note: One appearance in UEFA Intertoto Cup, four in UEFA Cup)	0	41	0
Fulham	Total		173	6	18	1	12	0	6	0	209	7
Liverpool	2003–04	Premier League	22	0	3	0	0	0	6 (Note: Appearances in UEFA Cup)	0	31	0
Liverpool	2004–05	Premier League	33	1	0	0	5	0	14 (Note: Appearances in UEFA Champions League)	0	52	1
Liverpool	2005–06	Premier League	33	0	6	0	0	0	13 (Note: Twelve appearances in Champions League, one in UEFA Super Cup)	0	52	0
Liverpool	2006–07	Premier League	33	0	1	0	0	0	13 (Note: Twelve appearances in Champions League, one in FA Community Shield)	0	47	0
Liverpool	2007–08	Premier League	24	0	3	0	1	0	7	0	35	0
Liverpool	Total		145	1	13	0	6	0	53	0	217	1
Espanyol	2008–09	La Liga	4	0	1	0	–		–		5	0
Portsmouth	2009–10	Premier League	21	0	4	0	0	0	–		25	0
Career total			496	16	43	2	26	0	66	1	631	19

=== International ===
Appearances and goals by national team and year
National team	Year	Apps	Goals
Republic of Ireland	2000	5	1
Republic of Ireland	2001	7	0
Republic of Ireland	2002	9	0
Republic of Ireland	2003	4	0
Republic of Ireland	2004	9	0
Republic of Ireland	2005	4	0
Republic of Ireland	2006	5	0
Republic of Ireland	2007	7	1
Republic of Ireland	2008	3	0
Total		53	2

Scores and results list Republic of Ireland's goal tally first, score column indicates score after each Finnan goal.

List of international goals scored by Steve Finnan
No.	Date	Venue	Opponent	Score	Result	Competition
1	14 November 2000	Lansdowne Road, Dublin, Ireland	Finland	1–0	3–0	Friendly
2	17 October 2007	Croke Park, Dublin, Ireland	Cyprus	1–1	1–1	UEFA Euro 2008 qualifying

== Honours ==
Notts County

- Football League Third Division: 1997–98

Fulham

- Football League First Division: 2000–01
- Football League Second Division: 1998–99
- UEFA Intertoto Cup: 2002

Liverpool

- FA Cup: 2005–06
- FA Community Shield: 2006
- UEFA Champions League: 2004–05; runner-up 2006–07
- UEFA Super Cup: 2005
- Football League Cup runner-up: 2004–05
- FIFA Club World Championship runner-up: 2005

Portsmouth

- FA Cup runner-up: 2009–10

Individual

- PFA Team of the Year: 1998–99 Second Division, 2000–01 First Division, 2001–02 Premier League
- Fulham Player of the Year: 2001–02
