= 2006 FA Community Shield =

- Match programme cover
- Event: FA Community Shield
Liverpool	Chelsea
2	1
- Date: 13 August 2006
- Venue: Millennium Stadium, Cardiff
- Man of the Match: Mohamed Sissoko (Liverpool)
- Referee: Martin Atkinson (West Yorkshire)
- Attendance: 56,275
- Weather: Scattered clouds 19 °C (66 °F)

The 2006 FA Community Shield was the 84th staging of the FA Community Shield, an annual football match played between the winners of the Premier League and FA Cup. The match was played between 2005–06 FA Cup winners Liverpool and 2005–06 Premier League champions Chelsea on 13 August 2006 at the Millennium Stadium, Cardiff. Chelsea were appearing in the competition for the sixth time, while Liverpool were making their 21st appearance. It was the final Community Shield to be held at the Millennium Stadium following the reconstruction of Wembley Stadium.

Chelsea, the Shield holders, qualified for the match as a result of winning the Premier League, which was their second successive league championship. Liverpool entered the competition after winning the FA Cup final against West Ham United 3–1 on penalties.

Watched by a crowd of 56,275, John Arne Riise opened the scoring for Liverpool early in the first half, only for Chelsea's recently signed forward Andriy Shevchenko to equalise shortly before half-time. Both sides had chances to win the match in the second half, but a Peter Crouch goal late in the half ensured Liverpool won the match 2–1, to win the Community Shield for the 15th time.

== Background ==
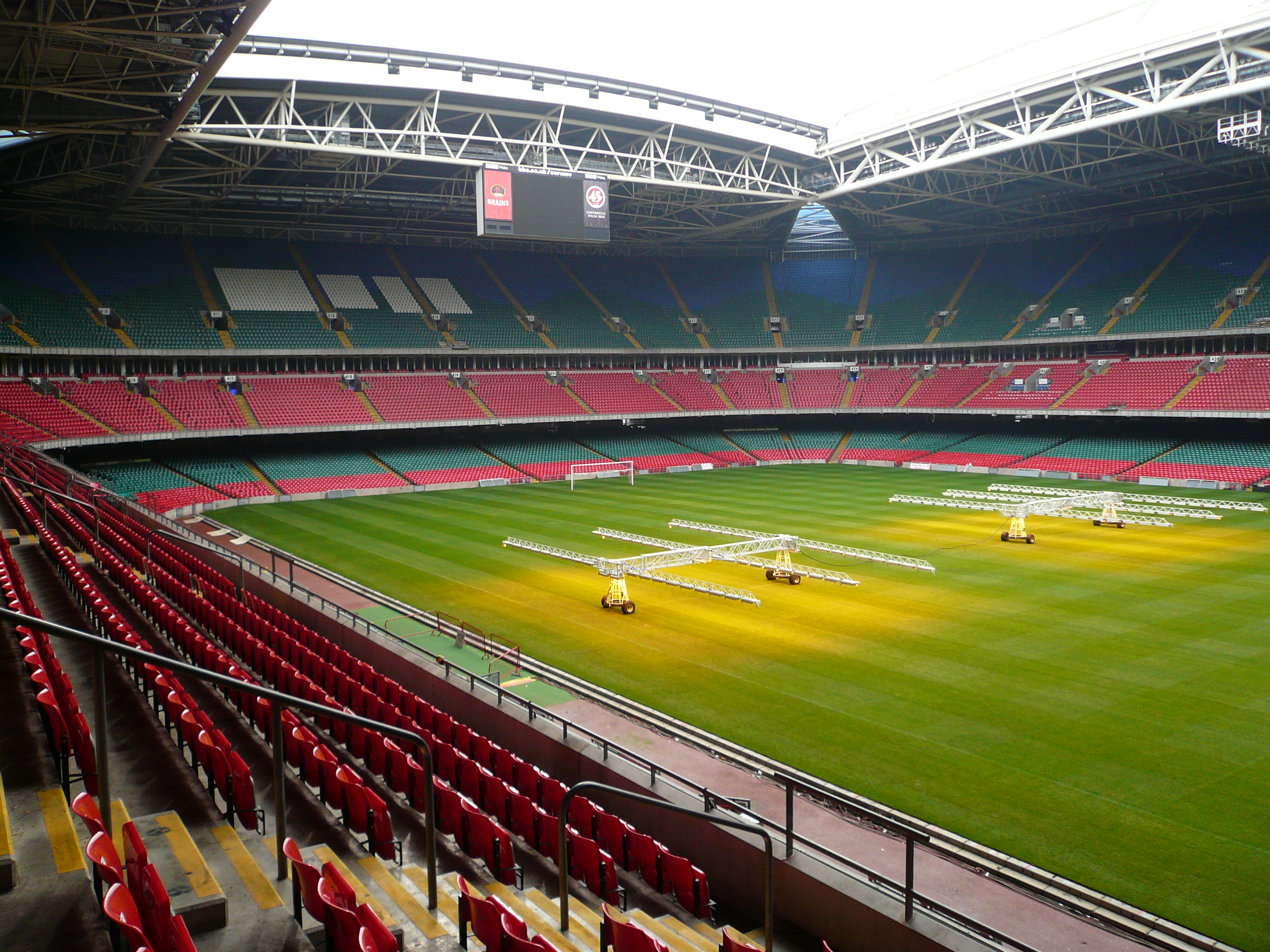
The Millennium Stadium, which was hosting the Community Shield for the last time

Founded in 1908 as a successor to the Sheriff of London Charity Shield, the FA Community Shield began as a contest between the respective champions of the Football League and Southern League, although in 1913, it was played between an Amateurs XI and a Professionals XI. In 1921, it was played by the league champions of the top division and FA Cup winners for the first time. (Note: The Premier League replaced the Football League First Division at the top of the English football pyramid after its inception in 1992.) Wembley Stadium acted as the host of the Shield from 1974. Cardiff's Millennium Stadium was hosting the Shield for the sixth and final time; it took over as the venue for the event between 2001 and 2006 while Wembley Stadium was being rebuilt. This was the first Charity/Community Shield to feature neither Arsenal nor Manchester United since 1995, when Premier League champions Blackburn Rovers faced FA Cup winners Everton.

Chelsea qualified for the Community Shield by winning the Premier League – their second successive championship. They finished eight points clear of second-placed Manchester United. Chelsea beat Liverpool in both their league meetings during the season. A 4–1 win away at Liverpool's home ground Anfield, was followed by a 2–0 victory in the corresponding fixture at their home ground, Stamford Bridge. The sides met in the semi-finals of the FA Cup, a match Liverpool won 2–1 to progress to the final. A 3–2 victory by Liverpool in a penalty shootout, after the 2006 FA Cup Final finished 3–3 with West Ham United, ensured the club's participation in the match.

Chelsea were appearing in the Community Shield for the sixth time and were the holders, after beating Arsenal 2–1 in the 2005 edition. Including this victory they had won the competition three times, in 1955 and 2000. In contrast, Liverpool were appearing in their 21st match in the competition. They had won eight outright (1966, 1976, 1979, 1980, 1982, 1988, 1989, 2001), shared five (1964, 1965, 1974, 1977, 1986, 1990) and lost six (1922, 1971, 1983, 1984, 1992, 2002). This was the first meeting between the two sides in the competition.

The match would normally be the first of the season for both clubs. However, as a result of finishing third in the Premier League, Liverpool were entered into the third qualifying round for the UEFA Champions League. They won the first of two legs against Israeli team Maccabi Haifa 2–1, courtesy of goals from new signings Craig Bellamy and Mark González. In addition to the signings of Bellamy and González, Liverpool had also purchased defender Fábio Aurélio and midfielder Jermaine Pennant. Chelsea had also brought in a number of players, despite winning successive league titles. Foremost among them was striker Andriy Shevchenko, who signed for a club record £30 million from Milan, manager José Mourinho was adamant that he would fit into the club's style of play: "Everybody knows him as a player, tactically he can play in the Chelsea system no doubt."

Chelsea were expected to start their new signings Shevchenko and Michael Ballack. However, they would be without midfielder Claude Makélélé, who had been allowed extra time to recover from playing for France in the 2006 FIFA World Cup. They would be without goalkeeper Petr Čech and midfielder Joe Cole, who had knee and shoulder injuries, respectively. Liverpool were expected to be without striker Robbie Fowler and defender Aurélio for the match, who were suffering from knee and calf injuries, respectively. Manager Rafael Benítez stated 'we would rather wait until next weekend', before playing the pair.

== Match ==
=== Summary ===
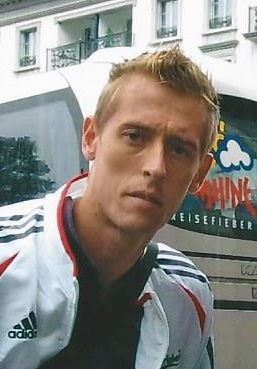
Peter Crouch scored the winning goal for Liverpool.

Chelsea lined up in a 4–3–3 formation while Liverpool, who kicked off the match, lined up in a 4–4–2. Within nine minutes Liverpool had taken the lead. Defender John Arne Riise ran with the ball from his own half and hit a shot from 25 yards (23 m), which beat Chelsea goalkeeper Carlo Cudicini. Chelsea midfielder Ballack received the first booking of the match in the 7th minute after he kicked Liverpool midfielder Momo Sissoko, and his partner Frank Lampard was given a yellow card eight minutes later for kicking Boudewijn Zenden. Liverpool almost extended their lead in the 22nd minute, when Paulo Ferreira's pass to Cudicini caught him unaware, however, the ball went wide of the Chelsea goal and out for a corner. Chelsea made the first substitution of the match in the 26th minute, when debutant Salomon Kalou replaced the injured Ballack. Cudicini kept the score at 1–0 in the 42nd minute, when he made saves to deny González and then a subsequent Peter Crouch shot. Chelsea scored two minutes later when Lampard passed the ball cross-field to striker Shevchenko who controlled the ball on his chest and shot past Liverpool goalkeeper Pepe Reina to level the score at 1–1.

The first chance of the second half fell to Liverpool, but midfielder Zenden sent his shot wide of the Chelsea goal. The first substitution of the half came in the 54th minute when Chelsea replaced Geremi with Wayne Bridge. A minute later, they had two chances to take the lead. Reina saved a shot by Didier Drogba and from the resulting corner, he saved a Shevchenko header. Liverpool made their first substitutions of the match within the first 15 minutes of the second half as Aurélio replaced González, before a double-change saw Steven Gerrard and Xabi Alonso come on for Zenden and Pennant. Alonso received a yellow card two minutes after coming on for a challenge on Michael Essien. Two more substitutions were made in the coming minutes with Chelsea replacing Arjen Robben with Lassana Diarra and Bellamy replacing Luis García for Liverpool. Diarra was shown a yellow card soon after for a foul on Alonso. The resulting free-kick saw Alonso pass the ball to Aurélio, but his subsequent pass to Bellamy was blocked.

Chelsea had the best of the chances after this, with Shevchenko controlling a long pass with his chest before passing to Kalou, but his subsequent attempt went wide of the Liverpool goal. Then two minutes later Shaun Wright-Phillips, who had replaced Drogba, ran down the right-hand side of the pitch. He passed the ball to Kalou, but he was unable to pass to Shevchenko in the Liverpool penalty area, after being blocked by the Liverpool defence. Minutes later, Liverpool took the lead again; Bellamy advanced with the ball down the left-hand side of the pitch, his pass found Crouch, who headed into the Chelsea goal to make it 2–1. The lead was almost extended minutes later, as a Gerrard pass found Aurélio in the Chelsea penalty area, but his shot was saved by Cudicini. Chelsea had a final chance in stoppage time from a Lampard free-kick, but the ball was cleared from the Liverpool penalty area by Sissoko.

=== Details ===
13 August 2006
15:00 GMT

Liverpool	2–1	Chelsea
Riise 9'; Crouch 80'	Report	Shevchenko 44'

Millennium Stadium, Cardiff
Attendance: 56,275
Referee: Martin Atkinson (West Yorkshire)

Liverpool	Chelsea

GK	25	(Spain) Pepe Reina
RB	3	(Republic of Ireland) Steve Finnan
CB	23	(England) Jamie Carragher (c)
CB	5	(Denmark) Daniel Agger
LB	6	(Norway) John Arne Riise
RM	16	(England) Jermaine Pennant		(substituted off) 60'
CM	22	(Mali) Mohamed Sissoko
CM	32	(Netherlands) Boudewijn Zenden		(substituted off) 60'
LM	11	(Chile) Mark González		(substituted off) 56'
SS	10	(Spain) Luis García		(substituted off) 66'
CF	15	(England) Peter Crouch		(substituted off) 89'
Substitutes:
GK	1	(Poland) Jerzy Dudek
DF	4	(Finland) Sami Hyypiä
DF	12	(Brazil) Fábio Aurélio		(substituted on) 56'
MF	8	(England) Steven Gerrard		(substituted on) 60'
MF	14	(Spain) Xabi Alonso	(yellow card) 61'	(substituted on) 60'
FW	17	(Wales) Craig Bellamy		(substituted on) 66'
FW	24	(France) Florent Sinama Pongolle		(substituted on) 89'
Manager:
(Spain) Rafael Benítez

GK	23	(Italy) Carlo Cudicini
RB	14	(Cameroon) Geremi		(substituted off) 53'
CB	26	(England) John Terry (c)
CB	6	(Portugal) Ricardo Carvalho
LB	20	(Portugal) Paulo Ferreira		(substituted off) 81'
CM	13	(Germany) Michael Ballack	(yellow card) 7'	(substituted off) 26'
CM	5	(Ghana) Michael Essien
CM	8	(England) Frank Lampard	(yellow card) 15'
RW	11	(Ivory Coast) Didier Drogba		(substituted off) 71'
LW	16	(Netherlands) Arjen Robben		(substituted off) 62'
CF	7	(Ukraine) Andriy Shevchenko
Substitutes:
GK	40	(Portugal) Hilário
DF	18	(England) Wayne Bridge		(substituted on) 53'
DF	44	(England) Michael Mancienne
MF	12	(Nigeria) Mikel John Obi		(substituted on) 81'
MF	19	(France) Lassana Diarra	(yellow card) 68'	(substituted on) 62'
MF	24	(England) Shaun Wright-Phillips		(substituted on) 71'
FW	21	(Ivory Coast) Salomon Kalou		(substituted on) 26'
Manager:
(Portugal) José Mourinho

Man of the match

- Mohamed Sissoko (Liverpool)

Match officials

- Assistant referees:
  - Roger East (Wiltshire)
  - Shaun Proctor-Green (Lincolnshire)
- Fourth official: Mark Clattenburg (County Durham)

Match rules

- 90 minutes
- Penalty shoot-out if scores level after 90 minutes
- Seven named substitutes
- Maximum of six substitutions

=== Statistics ===
Statistic	Liverpool	Chelsea
Goals scored	2	1
Shots on target	7	3
Shots off target	4	5
Ball possession	50%	50%
Corner kicks	5	4
Fouls committed	18	13
Yellow cards	1	3
Red cards	0	0

== Post-match ==
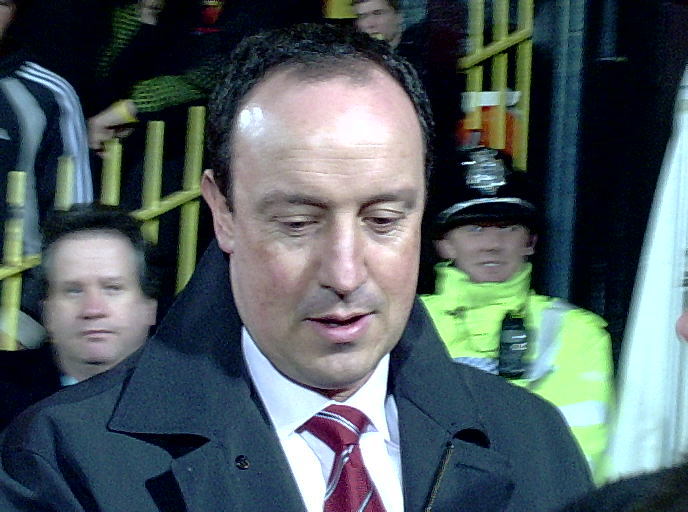
Liverpool manager Rafael Benítez felt that victory would give his team confidence for the coming season.

Liverpool manager Benítez was confident that victory in the match would provide his side with a boost ahead of their opening match of the 2006–07 FA Premier League with Sheffield United: "This will give us a lot of confidence I am sure, to play one of the best sides in the world and to beat them, this should give us more confidence going into what will be an interesting season." He also defended his decision to players such as Gerrard and Alonso on the bench: "It was my idea to start with the players that had the most fitness and have played the most minutes. Then I wanted to bring the other players on towards the end. It worked and it showed that we have a great squad – better than last season." Crouch, scorer of the winning goal, was also confident the result would boost the Liverpool squad: "There is a bit of rivalry between the sides and it is great to get an early one over them. Make no bones about it, this is a big game to win and it certainly could give us a psychological edge this season."

Chelsea manager Mourinho was primarily concerned with the fitness of his squad in the aftermath of the match, in particular Ballack, who was substituted with an injury early in the match: "He had a kick in the muscle and he couldn't run but I hope he will be back soon, we have quite a few players not in condition and we need players back, so I hope it's not a big deal." He felt that the fitness of the two squads was the decisive factor in the match: "Today our bench was not very good, with some kids, Liverpool could inject fresh blood at the same time as some of my players became really tired. They were broken. They were in better condition than us, you could see the difference between Frank Lampard and Sissoko." Mourinho was also unconcerned about his team's form heading into the start of the season: "Liverpool had more intensity and pace, qualities that make a team better. They had that and we didn't. We had a big percentage of the ball possession, but Liverpool defended with intensity and looked dangerous when they counter-attacked. I keep saying they are a difficult team to beat and they can go to every game with an ambition to win. They are a good team but over 10 months of competition we will be there."

== See also ==
- 2006–07 FA Premier League
- 2006–07 FA Cup
