= James Lindley =

English footballer

Personal information
- Date of birth: 23 July 1981 (age 45)
- Place of birth: Sutton-in-Ashfield, England
- Position: Goalkeeper

Senior career*
Years	Team	Apps	(Gls)
1997–2001	Notts County	4	(0)
2000	→ Lincoln City (loan)	0	(0)
2000–2001	→ Mansfield Town (loan)	0	(0)
2001–2003	Gresley Rovers	101	(0)
2003–2004	Tamworth	6	(0)
2003–2004	→ Hucknall Town (loan)	3	(0)
2004	Stafford Rangers	18	(0)
2004–2006	Hucknall Town	40	(0)
2006–2007	Harrogate Town	42	(0)
2007–2008	Alfreton Town	10	(0)
2008	Ilkeston Town	7	(0)
2008–2009	Hucknall Town	42	(0)
2009–2010	Retford United	36	(0)
2010–2011	Glapwell	20	(0)
2011–	Hucknall Town	38	
- Grantham Town
- * Club domestic league appearances and goals

James Lindley (born 23 July 1981) is an English former professional footballer who played as a goalkeeper.

He signed his first professional contract at Notts County making his league debut in September 1999 and becoming the youngest goalkeeper to make a first team appearance for the club. He has also played for Tamworth, Lincoln City, Hucknall Town, Harrogate Town and Mansfield Town. He re-joined Ilkeston Town on a permanent basis in December 2007 after falling out of favour at Alfreton Town. However, he soon left Ilkeston Town and initially retired from football after struggling to keep an interest in the game. In May 2008 he signed for Hucknall for a third time. At the start of the 2009/2010 season, Lindley had joined Retford United At the start of the 2012/2013 season, he was signed by Grantham Town in the Premier Division of the Northern Premier League. After spells at Loughborough and Handsworth Parramore he retired from the game in March 2015.
