= Brian Parkin =

English footballer (born 1965)

Personal information
- Date of birth: 12 October 1965 (age 61)
- Place of birth: Birkenhead, England
- Height: 6 ft 3 in (1.91 m)
- Position: Goalkeeper

Senior career*
Years	Team	Apps	(Gls)
1983–1985	Oldham Athletic	6	(0)
1984	→ Crewe Alexandra (loan)	12	(0)
1985–1988	Crewe Alexandra	86	(0)
1987	→ Crystal Palace (loan)	0	(0)
1988–1989	Crystal Palace	20	(0)
1989–1996	Bristol Rovers	241	(0)
1996–1998	Wycombe Wanderers	25	(0)
1998	Notts County	1	(0)
1999	Brighton & Hove Albion	0	(0)
1999	Yeovil Town	0	(0)
1999–2001	Bristol Rovers	5	(0)
Total		396	(0)
- * Club domestic league appearances and goals

Brian Parkin (born 12 October 1965) is a former professional footballer who played as a goalkeeper who used to work as academy director at Team Bath.

Parkin was born in Birkenhead, Cheshire. He began his career at Oldham Athletic. He was on the books of eight different teams, although he never made an appearance for Brighton & Hove Albion or Yeovil Town, despite being contracted to them. The bulk of his career was spent at Bristol Rovers, for whom he made 246 appearances in two spells. In his second period at Bristol Rovers he was primarily the goalkeeping coach, but also made a handful of appearances for the first team.

After leaving Bristol Rovers, Parkin joined Team Bath, where he was football academy director. He then spent time working for Southampton FC Academy, before retiring.

== Honours ==
Bristol Rovers

- Football League Third Division: 1989–90
- Associate Members' Cup runner-up: 1989–90
