= Mark Warren (footballer) =

English footballer

Personal information
- Date of birth: 12 November 1974 (age 51)
- Place of birth: Lower Clapton, London, England
- Position: Defender

Senior career*
Years	Team	Apps	(Gls)
1992–1999	Leyton Orient	161	(5)
1998–1999	→ Oxford United (loan)	4	(0)
1999–2002	Notts County	84	(1)
2002–2003	Colchester United	20	(0)
2003–2004	Southend United	32	(2)
2004–2006	Fisher Athletic		
2006–2008	King's Lynn	65	(6)
2009	AFC Sudbury	1	(0)
- * Club domestic league appearances and goals

Mark Warren (born 12 November 1974) is an English former professional footballer.

== Biography ==
Born in Lower Clapton, London, Warren started his career at Leyton Orient. He was voted Orient's player of the year in 1996–97, but the following year was loaned out to Oxford United, for whom he made four appearances.

In January 1999 he was signed by Notts County for £30,000. After three years in Nottingham, he signed for Colchester United in August 2002, before moving to Southend United in June 2003.

In July 2004 he dropped into non-League and signed for Fisher Athletic. In 2006, he moved to King's Lynn to play under former Orient manager Tommy Taylor, and captained the club to the Southern League title in 2008.

In September 2009 he signed for AFC Sudbury, but left the club after a single appearance and retired from football.

== Honours ==
Southend United

- Football League Trophy runner-up: 2003–04

King's Lynn

- Southern Football League: 2007–08
