= Adam Webster (footballer, born 1980) =

English footballer

Personal information
- Date of birth: 3 July 1980 (age 46)
- Place of birth: Nottingham, England
- Position: Striker

Senior career*
Years	Team	Apps	(Gls)
1999–2000	Notts County	1	(0)
2000–2002	→ Bedworth United (loan)		
2002–2008	Worcester City	256	(94)
2008–2010	Hinckley United	0	(0)
2010–2011	Corby Town	23	(3)
- * Club domestic league appearances and goals

Adam Webster (born 3 July 1980 in Nottingham, England) is an English footballer who played in The Football League for Notts County.

== Career ==
Webster started his career at his local side Notts County, where he made his senior debut in a 1–0 defeat away at Scunthorpe United during the 1999–2000 season. He was released at the end of the season and joined non-league side Bedworth United. He then went on to play for Worcester City, Hinckley United and Corby Town. He left Corby in March 2011.
