= Justin Jackson (footballer) =

English footballer (born 1974)

Personal information
- Full name: Justin Jonathan Jackson
- Date of birth: 10 December 1974 (age 51)
- Place of birth: Nottingham, England
- Position: Forward

Youth career
- 1993–1994: Bolton Wanderers

Senior career*
Years	Team	Apps	(Gls)
1993–1994	Lancaster City		
1994–1995	Ayr United	27	(4)
1995–1996	Penrith		
1995–1996	Ilkeston Town	23	(7)
1995–1996	Morecambe		
1996–1997	Woking	1	(1)
1997–1999	Notts County	26	(1)
1998	→ Morecambe (loan)	?	(?)
1999	→ Rotherham United (loan)	2	(1)
1999	→ Halifax Town (loan)	17	(3)
1999–2000	Morecambe	38	(29)
2000–2001	Rushden & Diamonds	45	(18)
2001–2003	Doncaster Rovers	39	(5)
2003	Accrington Stanley	2	(0)
2007	Casey Comets		
2007–2008	Brackley Town		

International career
	England semi-pro	2	
- * Club domestic league appearances and goals as of 13:11, 13 July 2010 (UTC)

Justin Jonathan Jackson (born 10 December 1974 in Nottingham, England) is a former professional footballer, who last played for Southern League Premier Division side Brackley Town. He joined Brackley Town in July 2007.

Earlier in 2007, Jackson was expected to join Tamworth however was unable to gain international clearance from The Football Federation of Australia, who stated that they were not prepared to change his status from amateur to professional due to a transfer window imposed by FIFA. He had last played as an amateur for Casey Comets SC in Australia. Jackson continued to train with Tamworth in an attempt to secure a playing contract for the next season.

Earlier in his career, Jackson, enjoyed spells with Halifax Town and Morecambe. Jackson was the conference top scorer with 29 league goals in 99/00 in his only season at Morecambe, and in 2000 signed for Rushden & Diamonds for £180,000, a record transfer fee between two non-League clubs.

After clinching promotion to Division Three he soon moved on to Doncaster Rovers for £150,000 but it ended with the chairman paying up his contract and on 3 October he joined Accrington Stanley. Six weeks later his contract was cancelled when it was reported he failed to turn up for training. He then moved to Chester City on trial but was taken off during his trial game for the reserves and was not signed by the club.

In November 2004 Justin signed for Nationwide North club Stafford Rangers but did not even stay long enough to get match fit.

In the 2006–07 Jackson was nominated for the non-league goal of the year, though he did not make the top three.

== Honours ==
Woking

- FA Trophy: 1996–97

Notts County

- Football League Third Division: 1997–98
