= Ryan Ford (footballer) =

English footballer

Personal information
- Date of birth: 3 September 1978 (age 48)
- Place of birth: Worksop, England
- Position: Midfielder

Youth career
- 1994–1998: Manchester United

Senior career*
Years	Team	Apps	(Gls)
1998–2000	Manchester United	0	(0)
2000–2002	Notts County	1	(0)
2002–2003	Ilkeston Town		
2004–2005	Gainsborough Trinity		
2005–2010	Retford United		
- * Club domestic league appearances and goals

Ryan Ford (born 3 September 1978) is an English footballer who plays as a midfielder. Born in Worksop, Nottinghamshire, Ford began his career with Manchester United. When he failed to break into the first team, he was allowed to join Notts County in February 2000. Two years later, after just one league appearance for the Nottingham club, he moved to non-league Ilkeston Town, but left after only a year. In 2004, he joined Gainsborough Trinity, but again left a year later to join Retford United. He left Retford by mutual consent in February 2010 after failing to agree a new contract, but by September 2010, he was back with the club.
