= Richard Holmes (footballer) =

English footballer

Personal information
- Date of birth: 7 November 1980 (age 45)
- Place of birth: Grantham, England
- Position: Defender

Senior career*
Years	Team	Apps	(Gls)
1998–2003	Notts County	59	(0)
2002	→ Hereford United (loan)	8	(0)
- * Club domestic league appearances and goals

Richard Holmes (born 7 November 1980) is a former footballer who played in The Football League for Notts County. He also had a loan spell at Hereford United in the Conference National.

== Early life ==
Holmes grew up in Bottesford, Leicestershire.
