= Ian Richardson (footballer, born 1970) =

English footballer and manager

Personal information
- Full name: Ian George Richardson
- Date of birth: 22 October 1970 (age 56)
- Place of birth: Barking, England
- Positions: Midfielder; centre half

Senior career*
Years	Team	Apps	(Gls)
19xx–1995	Dagenham & Redbridge		
1995–1996	Birmingham City	7	(0)
1996	→ Notts County (loan)	4	(0)
1996–2005	Notts County	249	(21)

Managerial career
- 2004–2005: Notts County
- * Club domestic league appearances and goals

Ian George Richardson (born 22 October 1970) is an English former professional footballer and football manager. He played 260 games in the Football League for Birmingham City and for Notts County, where he spent most of his professional career, including for a time acting as caretaker manager. He played as a midfielder or centre half.

== Career ==
Richardson was born in Barking. He worked as a meat-porter at Smithfield Market and played football part-time before his performances with Dagenham & Redbridge in the Conference earned him a £60,000 move to Birmingham City, newly promoted to the Football League First Division (the second tier of English football), in the 1995 close season. Dagenham teammate Jason Broom described him as "Never the most gifted player in the world but was a ferocious tackler. He used to get from box to box and scored lots of goals mainly through his excellence in the air." He made his debut in the Football League on 8 October 1995, as a substitute replacing Jonathan Hunt in a 2–0 win at home to Southend United. Only three months later Richardson joined Notts County on loan. Though he returned to Birmingham and made three more first-team appearances, including a place in the starting eleven for the second leg of the League Cup semi-final against Leeds United, Richardson joined Notts County on a permanent basis in March 1996 for a fee of £150,000.

=== Notts County ===
In the 1997–98 season, Richardson was part of Sam Allardyce's Notts County team which won the Division Three title by a record margin and at a record early date. A £350,000 move to Wimbledon foundered on a failed medical, much to the delight of County's manager Jocky Scott. With the club in financial difficulties, Richardson took a pay cut to remain at County because his family were settled in the area. His contract expired at the end of the 2002–03 season; with the club in administration and subject to a transfer embargo, it was not until August 2003 that the Football League gave them permission to offer Richardson monthly terms. Richardson said that "the problems never influenced the players on the pitch – only during every other moment when they weren't playing."

Richardson was appointed caretaker player-manager in November 2004 after the departure of Gary Mills, though his injured knee restricted him to a largely managerial role. He successfully led the team away from relegation and to the Third Round of the FA Cup, but was replaced as manager by Gudjon Thordarson at the end of the season. Despite his limited playing appearances in the 2004–05 season, Richardson was voted County's Player of the Year for the second consecutive year, and was selected as League Two's "Unsung Hero" in BBC Sport's alternative awards list. After his playing contract expired in June 2005, he was given a monthly contract to allow him time to prove his fitness; despite playing in two reserve games, the club's view was "the knee has not made a sufficient recovery for the acquired [sic] level of professional football", and Richardson was released. The player took legal advice and consulted the Professional Footballers' Association, but after trials with Peterborough United and Burton Albion, he decided to retire as a player and to accept the offer of a testimonial match and a coaching role with the club's Football in the Community programme.

As of 2010, Richardson was working as Activity Manager for Notts County's Football in the Community programme, which won the League Two Best Community Initiative Award at the 2008 Football League Awards ceremony for a project designed to use football to approach the improvement of self-esteem and life skills of adult males with mental health issues.

== Honours ==
Notts County

- Football League Third Division: 1997–98
