= Dennis Pearce =

English footballer (born 1974)

Personal information
- Full name: Dennis Anthony Pearce
- Date of birth: 10 September 1974
- Place of birth: Wolverhampton, England
- Height: 6 ft 0 in (1.83 m)
- Position: Defender

Team information
- Current team: Stourport Swifts

Youth career
- Aston Villa

Senior career*
Years	Team	Apps	(Gls)
1993–1995	Aston Villa	0	(0)
1995–1997	Wolverhampton Wanderers	9	(0)
1997–2001	Notts County	117	(3)
2001–2004	Peterborough United	14	(0)
2004	Stafford Rangers	8	(0)
2004	Northwich Victoria	8	(0)
2004–2005	Stafford Rangers	10	(0)
2005–2006	Redditch United	19	(0)
2006–2007	Worcester City	21	(0)
2007	AFC Telford United	2	(0)
2007–2008	Halesowen Town	?	(?)
2008–2009	Bromsgrove Rovers	?	(?)
2009–2010	Halesowen Town	?	(?)
2009–2010	→ Stratford Town (loan)	?	(?)
2010–?	Stratford Town	?	(?)
2011	Barwell	?	(?)
2011–	Stourport Swifts	?	(?)
- * Club domestic league appearances and goals

Dennis Anthony Pearce (born 10 September 1974) is an English footballer of Caribbean descent, who formerly played at professional level and is now playing as a semi-professional. His position is left-back.

Pearce began his career as a trainee with Aston Villa on leaving school in 1991, turning professional in June 1993, but never made a first-team appearance and signed for local rivals Wolverhampton Wanderers in July 1995. He only made a handful of appearances at Molineux before his transfer to Notts County in July 1997.

Pearce had far more chances at Notts County, who had just been relegated to Division Three. Manager Sam Allardyce gave Pearce a regular first-team place and his first season was a great success as he inspired County to Division Three title glory – in a historic season which saw County become the first English football team to win promotion before the end of March.

In four seasons at Meadow Lane, Pearce played in some 140 first-team games and was Player of the Year in his final season at the club.

He transferred to Peterborough United in June 2001, where due to injury and poor form he managed just 16 competitive first team games in three seasons. He joined Stafford Rangers, moving to Conference National side Northwich Victoria in September 2004. However, he was released by Northwich in December 2004 and rejoined Stafford Rangers.

He moved to Redditch United in the 2005 close season, moving to local rivals Worcester City in January 2006. He was released by Worcester in March 2007 and joined AFC Telford United. However, he was released by Telford at the end of the season.

He moved from Halesowen Town to Bromsgrove Rovers in the 2008 close season and was appointed as Rovers' captain. However, in December 2008 he was linked with a move from Bromsgrove back to Halesowen Town.

On 10 January 2009, he did indeed move back to The Yeltz. In late 2009 he joined Stratford Town on loan, remaining with the club until the end of the season.

In February 2011 he joined Barwell as player-coach.

In May 2011 he moved to Stourport Swifts as player-coach.

== Honours ==
Notts County

- Football League Third Division: 1997–98

Individual

- PFA Team of the Year: 1997–98 Third Division
