= Darren Ward (footballer, born 1974) =

Footballer (born 1974)

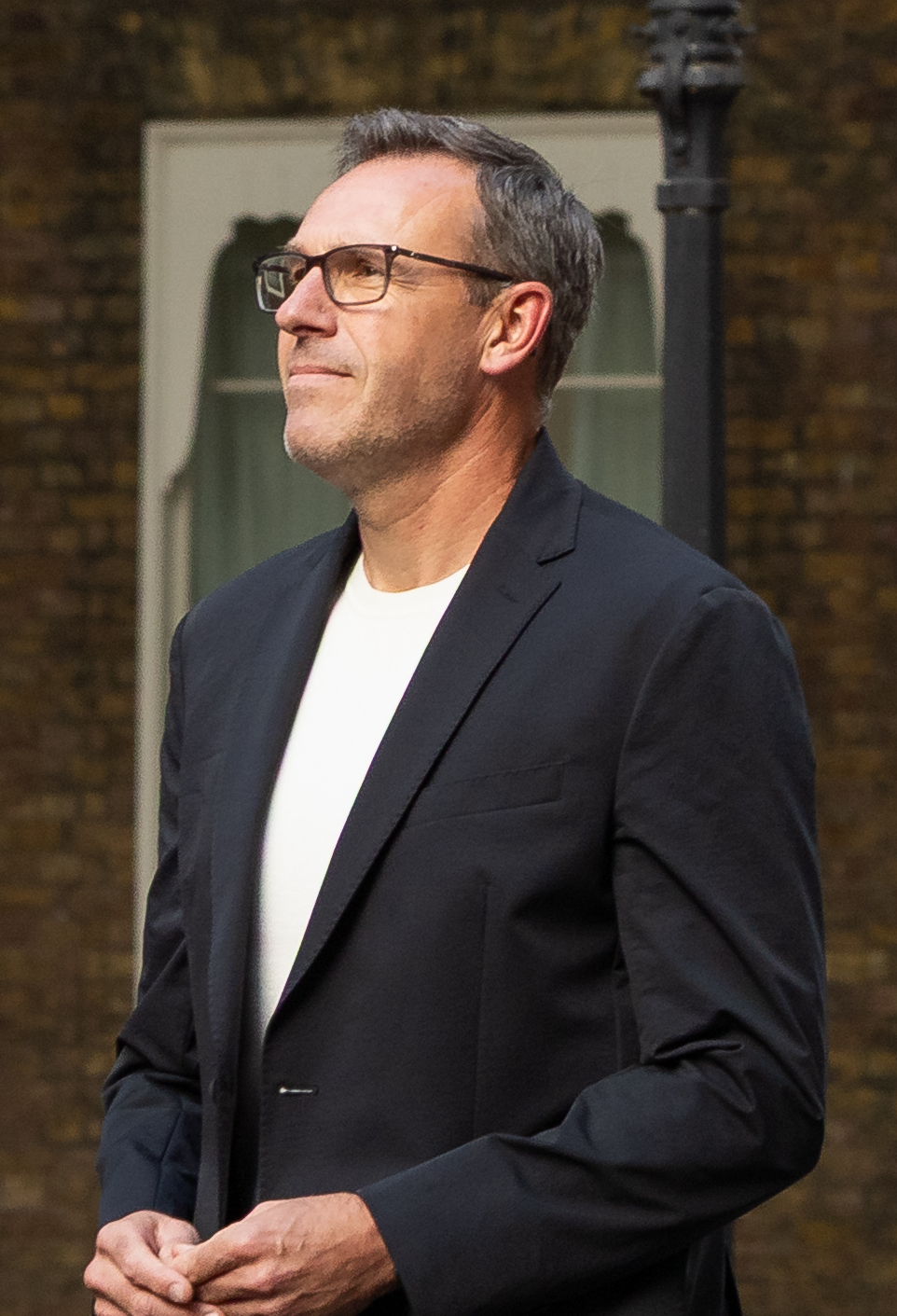
- Ward in 2025

Personal information
- Full name: Darren Ward
- Date of birth: 11 May 1974 (age 52)
- Place of birth: Worksop, Nottinghamshire, England
- Height: 5 ft 11 in (1.80 m)
- Position: Goalkeeper

Team information
- Current team: England Women (goalkeeping coach)

Senior career*
Years	Team	Apps	(Gls)
1992–1995	Mansfield Town	81	(0)
1995–2001	Notts County	252	(0)
2001–2004	Nottingham Forest	123	(0)
2004–2006	Norwich City	1	(0)
2006–2009	Sunderland	33	(0)
2009	→ Wolverhampton Wanderers (loan)	0	(0)
Total		490	(0)

International career
2000–2004	Wales	5	(0)
- * Club domestic league appearances and goals

Darren Ward (born 11 May 1974) is a former professional footballer who played as a goalkeeper. Born in England, he made five appearances for the Wales national team. He is goalkeeping coach of the England women's national team.

== Club career ==
Born in Worksop, Nottinghamshire, Ward started his professional career with Mansfield Town, where he made 97 appearances, helping them reach the play-offs. He moved to Notts County for £150,000 in July 1995, where he would go on to make his most appearances. During a six-season stay, he played over 300 games for the Meadow Lane club.

He moved across the River Trent in 2001 to join local rivals Nottingham Forest. He spent three seasons in the First Division with Forest as they strove for promotion back to the Premier League, but a play-off spot in 2003 was as near as they managed.

He finally got his opportunity to play in the top flight when he joined newly promoted Norwich City in a two-year deal in August 2004. However, the form of Robert Green meant he only managed one appearance in the Premier League, coming on as a substitute in a defeat at Charlton Athletic. The club was relegated after a solitary season at the highest level, but Ward made no further appearances for the Canaries in the lower tier either.

He was released at the end of the 2005–06 season after not signing a new contract at the club, and on 4 August 2006, he signed a contract at Sunderland. He had to wait until October for his debut, replacing teenager Ben Alnwick after the appointment of Roy Keane as manager, but made the number 1 spot his own for the rest of the season as the side went on to top the Championship. One particularly outstanding save against Southampton which was later described as being in the style of Gordon Banks by opposition manager George Burley.

Ward found himself replaced by £9million new signing Craig Gordon upon Sunderland's return to the Premier League, but did manage three appearances, keeping a clean sheet in his first, a 1–0 win over Derby County. During the January 2008 winter transfer window, he rejected a move to Scottish giants Rangers, preferring to stay and fight to be the first-choice keeper at the Stadium of Light.

He failed to break back into the first team at Sunderland the following season and joined Wolverhampton Wanderers of the Championship in March 2009 on loan for the remainder of the campaign. However, injury meant he returned to his parent club early.

He was released by Sunderland on 28 May 2009 and subsequently announced his playing retirement. On 12 October 2009 it was announced that Ward was the new goalkeeping coach for Peterborough United, replacing Andy Dibble, who departed from the role for personal reasons.

== International career ==
Ward won five caps for the Welsh national team before announcing his international retirement in May 2007. He made his international debut on 2 June 2000 in a 3–0 friendly defeat to Portugal. He had to wait until 2002 for his next cap, and won further caps during 2003–04, all during friendly internationals.

== Family ==
Ward married Nicola in 1997 and later became a father to Rhys Harry (2000) and Evie Mae (2003).

== Honours ==
Notts County

- Football League Third Division: 1997–98

Sunderland

- Football League Championship: 2006–07

Individual

- PFA Team of the Year: 1995–96 Second Division, 1997–98 Third Division
