= Matt Redmile =

English footballer

Personal information
- Full name: Matthew Ian Redmile
- Date of birth: 12 November 1976 (age 49)
- Place of birth: Nottingham, England
- Position: Defender

Senior career*
| Years | Team | Apps | (Gls) |
| 1995–2001 | Notts County | 140 | (7) |
| 2001–2003 | Shrewsbury Town | 107 | (6) |
| 2003–2004 | Scarborough | 22 | (3) |
| 2004–2004 | Barnet | 11 | (0) |
| 2004–2006 | Tamworth | 76 | (3) |
| 2006–2007 | Hinckley United | 4 | (0) |
| 2007 | Sutton Town | ? | (?) |
| 2007–2008 | Goole | ? | (?) |
- * Club domestic league appearances and goals as of 20:20, 29 July 2006 (UTC)

Matt Redmile (born 12 November 1976) is a former professional footballer. He was a defender.

== Playing career ==
Born in Nottingham, he started his football career at local side Notts County as a trainee before joining Shrewsbury Town for £30,000 in 2000 - a transfer paid for in part by the Shrewsbury Town fans through their Independent Supporters Club. He had previously been on loan there.

Redmile then moved to Scarborough and Barnet before signing for Tamworth in July 2004 after impressing in the Lambs' pre-season campaign.

During his time with Tamworth, Redmile scored one of Tamworth's most important goals. He scored the winning goal against League One side Hartlepool United, which booked Tamworth's place in the 3rd round draw of the FA Cup.

On 24 August 2006, Redmile left the Lambs for rivals Hinckley United, but after lasting less than a year, he was released by Hinckley in May, 2007. In July 2007 he joined Sutton Town.

== Honours ==
Notts County

- Football League Third Division: 1997–98
