= 1996–97 Peterborough United F.C. season =

Peterborough United
1996–97 season
- Chairman: Barry Fry
- Manager: Barry Fry
- Stadium: London Road Stadium
- Second Division: 21st (relegated)
- FA Cup: Fourth round
- League Cup: Second round
- Auto Windscreens Shield: Southern final
- Top goalscorer: League: Houghton (8); All: Houghton (9)
Home colours

During the 1996–97 English football season, Peterborough United F.C. competed in the Football League Second Division.

== Season summary ==
In the 1996–97 season, Peterborough appointed Barry Fry as manager and chairman just after leaving Birmingham at the end of last season. His first season in charge wasn't great and Peterborough were relegated to the Third Division.

== Final league table ==
Pos	Team	Pld	W	D	L	GF	GA	GD	Pts	Promotion or relegation
19	Plymouth Argyle	46	12	18	16	47	58	−11	54	
20	York City	46	13	13	20	47	68	−21	52	
21	Peterborough United (R)	46	11	14	21	55	73	−18	47	Relegation to the Third Division
22	Shrewsbury Town (R)	46	11	13	22	49	74	−25	46	Relegation to the Third Division
23	Rotherham United (R)	46	7	14	25	39	70	−31	35	Relegation to the Third Division

Rules for classification: In the Football League goals scored (GF) takes precedence over goal difference (GD).
(R) Relegated

== Results ==
Peterborough United's score comes first

=== Legend ===
Win	Draw	Loss

=== Football League Second Division ===
Date	Opponent	Venue	Result	Attendance	Scorers
17 August 1996	Bristol Rovers	A	0–1	6,232	
24 August 1996	Crewe Alexandra	H	2–2	6,357	Houghton, O'Connor (pen)
31 August 1996	Bournemouth	A	2–1	4,587	Willis, Griffiths
7 September 1996	Wrexham	A	1–1	3,222	O'Connor
10 September 1996	Millwall	H	3–3	4,442	Rowe, Charlery, O'Connor
14 September 1996	York City	H	2–2	5,613	Rowe, Payne
21 September 1996	Watford	A	0–0	12,007	
28 September 1996	Wycombe Wanderers	H	6–3	5,580	Heald, Charlery, Payne, Clark, Farrell (2)
1 October 1996	Plymouth Argyle	A	1–1	4,929	Regis
5 October 1996	Preston North End	A	4–3	8,874	Clark, Houghton, Charlery, Rowe
8 October 1996	Notts County	H	1–3	5,456	Farrell
12 October 1996	Bury	H	1–2	6,003	Heald
15 October 1996	Brentford	H	0–1	5,037	
19 October 1996	Luton Town	A	0–3	5,964	
26 October 1996	Rotherham United	A	0–2	2,854	
29 October 1996	Shrewsbury Town	H	2–2	5,400	Houghton (2, 1 pen)
2 November 1996	Blackpool	H	0–0	7,011	
9 November 1996	Walsall	A	0–4	3,921	
19 November 1996	Gillingham	H	0–1	4,136	
23 November 1996	Bristol City	A	0–2	12,312	
30 November 1996	Rotherham United	H	6–2	4,690	Carruthers (2), Willis (2), Houghton (pen), Monington (own goal)
3 December 1996	Chesterfield	A	1–2	2,805	Ebdon
14 December 1996	Stockport County	A	0–0	5,748	
20 December 1996	Burnley	H	3–2	5,283	Carruthers (2), Morrison
26 December 1996	Millwall	A	2–0	8,118	Houghton (2)
18 January 1997	Plymouth Argyle	H	0–0	6,288	
25 January 1997	Shrewsbury Town	A	2–2	2,695	Houghton, Donowa
1 February 1997	Walsall	H	0–1	4,940	
8 February 1997	Blackpool	A	1–5	4,001	Cleaver
11 February 1997	Wrexham	H	0–1	2,975	
15 February 1997	Bristol City	H	3–1	4,221	Willis (2), Otto
22 February 1997	Gillingham	A	1–2	6,552	Morrison
25 February 1997	Wycombe Wanderers	A	0–2	4,001	
1 March 1997	Chesterfield	H	1–1	4,458	Otto
4 March 1997	Watford	H	2–1	4,200	Charlery, Boothroyd (pen)
8 March 1997	Burnley	A	0–5	8,646	
15 March 1997	Stockport County	H	0–2	4,857	
22 March 1997	Crewe Alexandra	A	1–1	3,565	Charlery
29 March 1997	Bristol Rovers	H	1–2	6,132	Otto
31 March 1997	Notts County	A	0–0	3,848	
5 April 1997	Bournemouth	H	3–1	4,221	Clark, de Souza, Otto
8 April 1997	York City	A	0–1	2,790	
12 April 1997	Preston North End	H	2–0	5,040	Willis, de Souza
19 April 1997	Bury	A	0–1	4,631	
26 April 1997	Luton Town	H	0–1	9,499	
3 May 1997	Brentford	A	1–0	5,274	Drury

=== FA Cup ===
Round	Date	Opponent	Venue	Result	Attendance	Goalscorers
R1	16 November 1996	Cheltenham Town	H	0–0	5,271	
R1R	27 November 1996	Cheltenham Town	A	3–1 (a.e.t.)	4,160	Charlery (2), Grazioli
R2	7 December 1996	Enfield	A	1–1	2,847	Charlery
R2R	17 December 1996	Enfield	H	4–1	3,997	Houghton, Charlery, Carruthers (2)
R3	4 January 1997	Plymouth Argyle	A	1–0	7,299	Charlery
R4	4 February 1997	Wrexham	H	2–4	8,734	Charlery, Griffiths

=== League Cup ===
Round	Date	Opponent	Venue	Result	Attendance	Goalscorers
R1 1st Leg	21 August 1996	Millwall	A	0–1	5,145	
R1 2nd Leg	3 September 1996	Millwall	H	2–0 (won 2–1 on agg)	4,610	Charlery, Griffiths
R2 1st Leg	18 September 1996	Southampton	A	0–2	14,467	
R2 2nd Leg	25 September 1996	Southampton	H	1–4 (lost 1–6 on agg)	8,220	Farrell

=== Football League Trophy ===
Round	Date	Opponent	Venue	Result	Attendance	Goalscorers
SR2	21 January 1997	Walsall	H	2–0	2,274	Donowa, Heald
SQF	28 January 1997	Exeter City	A	1–0	1,478	Donowa
SSF	18 February 1997	Watford	A	1–0	5,324	Otto
SF 1st Leg	11 March 1997	Colchester United	H	2–0	4,556	Otto, Charlery
SF 2nd Leg	18 March 1997	Colchester United	A	0–3 (lost 2–3 on agg)	4,705	

== Squad ==
Note: Flags indicate national team as defined under FIFA eligibility rules; some limited exceptions apply. Players may hold more than one non-FIFA nationality.

No.	Pos.	Nation	Player
—	GK	(Netherlands) NED	Bart Griemink
—	GK	(England) ENG	Jon Sheffield
—	GK	(England) ENG	Mark Tyler
—	DF	(England) ENG	Mike Basham
—	DF	(England) ENG	David Billington
—	DF	(England) ENG	Mick Bodley
—	DF	(England) ENG	Aidy Boothroyd
—	DF	(England) ENG	Simon Clark
—	DF	(England) ENG	Adam Drury
—	DF	(England) ENG	Andy Edwards
—	DF	(England) ENG	Mark Foran
—	DF	(England) ENG	Greg Heald
—	DF	(England) ENG	Richard Huxford (on loan from Bradford City)
—	DF	(England) ENG	Des Linton
—	DF	(England) ENG	Ashley Neal
—	DF	(England) ENG	Tony Spearing
—	DF	(Scotland) SCO	Steve Welsh
—	MF	(England) ENG	Wayne Bullimore
—	MF	(England) ENG	Danny Carter
—	MF	(England) ENG	Louie Donowa
—	MF	(Wales) WAL	Marcus Ebdon
—	MF	(England) ENG	Matthew Etherington
—	MF	(England) ENG	Scott Houghton

No.	Pos.	Nation	Player
—	MF	(Republic of Ireland) IRL	Niall Inman
—	MF	(England) ENG	Neil Le Bihan
—	MF	(Republic of Ireland) IRL	Mark McKeever
—	MF	(England) ENG	Dave Morrison
—	MF	(Cayman Islands) CAY	Martin O'Connor
—	MF	(England) ENG	Ricky Otto (on loan from Birmingham City)
—	MF	(England) ENG	Derek Payne
—	MF	(England) ENG	Craig Ramage (on loan from Watford)
—	MF	(England) ENG	Ben Sedgemore
—	FW	(England) ENG	Martin Carruthers
—	FW	(Saint Lucia) LCA	Ken Charlery
—	FW	(England) ENG	Chris Cleaver
—	FW	(England) ENG	Miguel de Souza
—	FW	(England) ENG	Sean Farrell
—	FW	(England) ENG	Giuliano Grazioli
—	FW	(Wales) WAL	Carl Griffiths
—	FW	(England) ENG	Scott McGleish
—	FW	(Republic of Ireland) IRL	Lee Power
—	FW	(England) ENG	Dave Regis (on loan from Barnsley)
—	FW	(England) ENG	Zeke Rowe
—	FW	(England) ENG	Dale Watkins
—	FW	(England) ENG	Mike Williams (on loan from Sheffield Wednesday)
—	FW	(England) ENG	Roger Willis
