= 1995–96 Peterborough United F.C. season =

Peterborough United
1995–96 season
- Chairman: Chris Turner
- Manager: John Still (until October); Mick Halsall (from October)
- Stadium: London Road Stadium
- Football League Second Division: 19th
- FA Cup: Fourth round
- Coca-Cola Cup: Second round
- Football League Trophy: Southern Section Semi-final
- Top goalscorer: League: Martindale (15); All: Martindale (18)
Home colours

During the 1995–96 English football season, Peterborough United F.C. competed in the Football League Second Division.

== Season summary ==
A poor start to the season that saw Peterborough win 3 out of the first 13 games forced manager John Still to leave the club in October 1995 to be replaced by Mick Halsall. They show signs of improvement between mid-February and mid-March which saw them win 5 out of the last 8 games climbing them to mid-table but as it seemed Peterborough were going to make a late charge for a play-off place, poor form returned, winning just 1 out of final 12 games picking up just 7 points during that run which saw them slump to a disappointing 19th place just 3 points clear of the relegation zone.

== Final league table ==
Pos	Team	Pld	W	D	L	GF	GA	GD	Pts	Promotion or relegation
17	Burnley	46	14	13	19	56	68	−12	55	
18	Shrewsbury Town	46	13	14	19	58	70	−12	53	
19	Peterborough United	46	13	13	20	59	66	−7	52	
20	York City	46	13	13	20	58	73	−15	52	
21	Carlisle United (R)	46	12	13	21	57	72	−15	49	Relegation to the Third Division

(R) Relegated

== Results ==
Peterborough United's score comes first

=== Legend ===
Win	Draw	Loss

=== Football League Second Division ===
Date	Opponent	Venue	Result	Attendance	Scorers
12 August 1995	Brighton & Hove Albion	H	3–1	5,394	Clark, Farrell, Martindale
19 August 1995	Bournemouth	A	0–3	4,175	
26 August 1995	Notts County	H	0–1	5,618	
29 August 1995	Blackpool	A	1–2	3,902	Heald
2 September 1995	Bristol City	H	1–1	4,621	Farrell
9 September 1995	Wycombe Wanderers	A	1–1	5,637	Farrell
12 September 1995	Carlisle United	A	1–1	6,027	Martindale
16 September 1995	Wrexham	H	1–0	3,817	Martindale
23 September 1995	Bradford City	H	3–1	4,509	Heald, Manuel, Martindale
30 September 1995	Rotherham United	A	1–5	2,863	Power
7 October 1995	Walsall	A	1–1	3,768	Power
14 October 1995	Swansea City	H	1–1	3,384	Carter
21 October 1995	Brentford	A	0–3	4,865	
28 October 1995	York City	H	6–1	4,605	Martindale (2), Morrison (2), Power, Shaw
31 October 1995	Burnley	H	0–2	4,737	
4 November 1995	Bristol Rovers	A	1–1	4,241	Shaw
18 November 1995	Oxford United	H	1–1	4,720	Shaw
25 November 1995	Hull City	A	3–2	3,620	Martindale (3)
9 December 1995	Bradford City	A	1–2	4,605	Farrell
16 December 1995	Rotherham United	H	1–0	3,847	Spearing
19 December 1995	Stockport County	H	0–1	3,267	
26 December 1995	Chesterfield	A	1–1	6,017	Heald
13 January 1996	Bournemouth	H	4–5	4,596	Farrell (2), Martindale (2)
20 January 1996	Brighton & Hove Albion	A	2–1	5,572	Shaw (2)
3 February 1996	Notts County	A	0–1	5,067	
10 February 1996	Shrewsbury Town	H	2–2	4,985	Martindale, Basham
17 February 1996	Carlisle United	H	6–1	4,032	Charlery (2), Ebdon, Farrell (2), Martindale (pen)
20 February 1996	Bristol City	A	1–0	5,014	Charlery
24 February 1996	Wrexham	A	0–1	4,011	
27 February 1996	Wycombe Wanderers	H	3–0	3,670	Martindale (2), Foran
2 March 1996	Chesterfield	H	0–1	6,105	
5 March 1996	Swindon Town	H	0–2	4,196	
9 March 1996	Stockport County	A	1–0	5,915	Power (pen)
16 March 1996	Crewe Alexandra	H	3–1	5,004	Charlery (2), Power
19 March 1996	Shrewsbury Town	A	1–1	2,291	Ansah
23 March 1996	Swindon Town	A	0–2	9,066	
26 March 1996	Blackpool	H	0–0	4,425	
30 March 1996	Walsall	H	2–3	4,954	Griffiths, Charlery
2 April 1996	Swansea City	A	0–0	3,805	
6 April 1996	York City	A	1–3	3,261	Ebdon (pen)
8 April 1996	Brentford	H	0–1	4,343	
13 April 1996	Burnley	A	1–2	8,393	Heald
20 April 1996	Bristol Rovers	H	0–0	4,884	
27 April 1996	Hull City	H	3–1	6,649	Power, Farrell, Charlery
30 April 1996	Crewe Alexandra	A	1–2	3,206	Grazioli
5 May 1996	Oxford United	A	0–4	7,535	

=== FA Cup ===
Round	Date	Opponent	Venue	Result	Attendance	Goalscorers
R1	11 November 1995	Exeter City	A	1–0	3,783	Le Bihan
R2	2 December 1995	Bognor Regis Town	H	4–0	5,004	Farrell (3), Ebdon
R3	6 January 1996	Wrexham	H	1–0	5,983	Le Bihan
R4	6 February 1996	Huddersfield Town	A	0–2	11,629	

=== League Cup ===
Round	Date	Opponent	Venue	Result	Attendance	Goalscorers
R1 First Leg	15 August 1995	Swansea City	A	1–4	1,862	Manuel
R1 Second Leg	22 August 1995	Swansea City	H	3–0	1,871	Manuel (2), Le Bihan
R2 First Leg	20 September 1995	Aston Villa	A	0–6	19,602	
R2 Second Leg	3 October 1995	Aston Villa	H	1–1	5,745	Martindale

=== Southern Section ===
Round	Date	Opponent	Venue	Result	Attendance	Goalscorers
R1 Group 3	26 September 1995	Plymouth Argyle	A	3–0	1,682	Clark, Power, McGleish
R1 Group 3	16 October 1995	Northampton Town	H	0–0	3,045	
R2	28 November 1995	Swansea City	H	1–0	1,952	Farrell
QF	9 January 1996	Colchester United	H	3–2	2,460	Martindale (2), McGleish
SF	13 February 1996	Bristol Rovers	H	0–1	3,761	

== Squad ==
Note: Flags indicate national team as defined under FIFA eligibility rules; some limited exceptions apply. Players may hold more than one non-FIFA nationality.

No.	Pos.	Nation	Player
—	GK	ENG	Jon Sheffield
—	DF	ENG	Simon Clark
—	DF	IRL	Gary Breen
—	DF	ENG	Greg Heald
—	MF	WAL	Marcus Ebdon
—	FW	IRL	Lee Power
—	DF	ENG	Kevin Ashley
—	MF	ENG	Lee Williams
—	DF	ENG	Danny Carter
—	FW	ENG	Gary Martindale
—	MF	ENG	Neil Le Bihan
—	DF	ENG	Mike Basham
—	MF	ENG	Billy Manuel
—	FW	WAL	Carl Griffiths
—	GK	ENG	Mark Tyler
—	MF	ENG	Mike Gregory
—	FW	ENG	Giuliano Grazioli
—	MF	ENG	Dave Morrison

No.	Pos.	Nation	Player
—	DF	ENG	Dean Hooper (on loan from Swindon Town)
—	MF	LCA	Ken Charlery
—	FW	ENG	Sean Farrell
—	MF	ENG	Robert Codner
—	MF	ENG	Paul Shaw (on loan from Arsenal)
—	DF	ENG	Tony Dobson
—	FW	ENG	Andy Furnell
—	DF	ENG	Tony Spearing
—	DF	SCO	Gregor Rioch
—	MF	ENG	Andy Ansah
—	DF	ENG	Mark Foran
—	FW	SCO	Scott McGleish
—	DF	ENG	Mark Blount
—	MF	ENG	Steve Robinson (on loan from Birmingham City)
—	FW	ENG	Steve Williams
—	DF	ENG	Adam Drury
—	MF	ENG	Ben Sedgemore
—	DF	IRL	Tom Meredith
