= 1999–2000 FA Cup =

Tournament details
- Country: England; Wales

Final positions
- Champions: Chelsea (3rd title)
- Runners-up: Aston Villa

Tournament statistics
- Top goal scorer(s): Gustavo Poyet (6 goals)

The 1999–2000 FA Cup (known as the FA Cup sponsored by AXA for sponsorship reasons) was the 119th staging of the FA Cup. Both the semifinals and final of the competition were played at Wembley Stadium for the last time before reconstruction work began. The competition culminated with the final between Chelsea and Aston Villa. The game was won by a goal from Chelsea's Roberto Di Matteo, giving them a 1–0 victory.

The title holders Manchester United, withdrew from the 1999–2000 competition due to their participation in the 2000 FIFA Club World Championship in South America, to take place in early 2000, thus becoming the first FA Cup winners not to defend their title. Despite this being at the request of the Football Association (FA), who believed the move would boost England's chances of winning the bid to host the 2006 FIFA World Cup, they received criticism from journalists and television pundits. To keep the competition running smoothly, the FA chose to draw one team from among those lower-division teams defeated in the second round to progress as "lucky losers" to the third. Darlington were the team drawn.

The main competition started in November 1999 for clubs from the Football League and Premiership.

== Calendar ==
Round	Date	Matches	Clubs	New entries this round	Prize money
Preliminary round	21 August 1999	166	558 → 392	161: 227th–387th	£1,000
First round qualifying	4 September 1999	116	392 → 276	66: 161st–226th	£2,250
Second round qualifying	18 September 1999	80	276 → 196	44: 117th–160th	£3,750
Third round qualifying	2 October 1999	40	196 → 156	none	£5,000
Fourth round qualifying	16 October 1999	32	156 → 124	24: 93rd–116th	£10,000
First round proper	30 October 1999	40	124 → 84	48: 45th–92nd	£16,000
Second round proper	19 November 1999	20	84 → 64	none	£24,000
Third round proper	11 December 1999	32	64 → 32	43: 2nd–44th‡	£40,000
Fourth round proper	8 January 2000	16	32 → 16	none	£60,000
Fifth round proper	29 January 2000	8	16 → 8	none	£120,000
Sixth round proper	19 February 2000	4	8 → 4	none	£300,000
Semi-finals	2 April 2000	2	4 → 2	none	£900,000
Final	20 May 2000	1	2 → 1	none	£1,000,000

‡ Manchester United, who were the winners the previous season, did not enter.

== Qualifying rounds ==
All participating clubs that were not members of the Premier League or Football League entered the competition in the qualifying rounds to secure one of 32 places available in the first round proper.

The winners from the fourth qualifying round were Guiseley, Eastwood Town, Gateshead, Doncaster Rovers, Tamworth, Hednesford Town, Southport, Morecambe, Stalybridge Celtic, Runcorn, Bamber Bridge, Worthing, Oxford City, Hendon, Whyteleafe, Merthyr Tydfil, Welling United, Hayes, Kingstonian, Rushden & Diamonds, Forest Green Rovers, Ilkeston Town, Yeovil Town, Bath City, Enfield, Chelmsford City, Aldershot Town, Burton Albion, Kettering Town, St Albans City, Hereford United and Cambridge City.

Eastwood Town, Bamber Bridge, Whyteleafe and Forest Green Rovers were appearing in the competition proper for the first time. Aldershot Town was also appearing at this stage for the first time in their own right, seven years after the mid-season demise of the original Aldershot FC. Of the others, only Oxford City, who had last featured in the first round in 1970-71, had not qualified for the main draw at least once in the last decade.

== First round proper ==
This is the first round in which teams from the Second and Third Divisions of the Football League compete with non-League teams.

- Ties were played over the weekend of 30 and 31 October 1999.
- Replays were played on 8, 9 and 10 November 1999.
- Five clubs from the various competitions at Step 7 of English football were the lowest-ranked teams in the draw: Eastwood Town, Worthing, Chelmsford City, Whyteleafe and Oxford City.
- This was the first season since the establishment of the Alliance Premier League (later Conference National and the National League) in 1979 that no clubs from Step 8 of the football pyramid (or lower) had qualified for the first round of the FA Cup.

30 October 1999	Aldershot Town (6)	1 – 1	Hednesford Town (5)	Recreation Ground, Aldershot
	Abbott 56'; Bentley (yellow card) 74' (red card); Bassey (red card) 83'		Robinson 51'	Attendance: 3,269; Referee: G Hegley

8 November 1999 Replay	Hednesford Town (5)	1 – 2	Aldershot Town (6)	Keys Park, Hednesford
	Lake 44'		Chewins 68'; Abbott 87'	Attendance: G Hegley; Referee: 1,719

31 October 1999	Barnet (4)	0 – 1	Burnley (3)	Underhill Stadium, Barnet
			Cook 74'	Attendance: 2,563; Referee: Rob Styles

31 October 1999	Bath City (6)	0 – 2	Hendon (6)	Twerton Park, Bath
			Gentle 74'; Genchev 90'	Attendance: 1,690; Referee: S Castle

30 October 1999	Blackpool (3)	2 – 0	Stoke City (3)	Bloomfield Road, Blackpool
	Carlisle 5'; Nowland 90'			Attendance: 4,721; Referee: D Laws

30 October 1999	Brentford (3)	2 – 2	Plymouth Argyle (4)	Griffin Park, London
	Owusu 56'; Marshall 63'		Stonebridge 43'; McGregor 83'	Attendance: 4,287; Referee: Anthony Bates

9 November 1999 replay	Plymouth Argyle (4)	2 – 1 (a.e.t.)	Brentford (3)	Home Park, Plymouth
	McGregor 67', 112'		Quinn 82'	Attendance: 5,409; Referee: Anthony Bates

30 October 1999	Bristol City (3)	3 – 2	Mansfield Town (4)	Ashton Gate, Bristol
	Tinnion 44', 50'; Murray 65'; Taylor (red card) 9'		Lormor 10' (pen.); Blake 89'	Attendance: 5,411; Referee: R Olivier

31 October 1999	Bristol Rovers (3)	0 – 1	Preston North End (3)	Memorial Stadium, Bristol
			McKenna 52'	Attendance: 6,145; Referee: M J Brandwood

30 October 1999	Burton Albion (6)	0 – 0	Rochdale (4)	Eton Park, Burton upon Trent
				Attendance: 3,103; Referee: Mark Halsey

9 November 1999 Replay	Rochdale (4)	3 – 0	Burton Albion (6)	Spotland, Rochdale
	Platt 5'; Peake 48'; Dowe 82'			Attendance: 2,633; Referee: Mark Halsey

30 October 1999	Cambridge City (6)	0 – 2	Wigan Athletic (3)	City Ground, Cambridge
			Barlow 30', 44'	Attendance: 4,024; Referee: Steve Tomlin

30 October 1999	Cambridge United (3)	1 – 0	Gateshead (6)	Abbey Stadium, Cambridge
	Taylor 79'		Fletcher (yellow card) 79' (red card)	Attendance: 2,970; Referee: Peter Walton

30 October 1999	Cheltenham Town (4)	1 – 1	Gillingham (3)	Whaddon Road, Cheltenham
	Brough 77'		Southall 37'	Attendance: 3,188; Referee: Trevor Parkes

9 November 1999 Replay	Gillingham (3)	3 – 2	Cheltenham Town (4)	Priestfield Stadium, Gillingham
	Thomson 24'; Pennock 41'; McGlinchey 77'		Milton 56'; Howarth 70'	Attendance: 4,352

30 October 1999	Chesterfield (3)	1 – 2	Enfield (6)	Saltergate, Chesterfield
	Lomas 49'		Bunn 23'; Brown 67'	Attendance: 2,506; Referee: Mark Warren

30 October 1999	Darlington (4)	2 – 1	Southport (5)	Feethams, Darlington
	Tutill 35'; Gabbiadini 77' (pen.)		Bolland 52'	Attendance: 4,313; Referee: S J Baines

30 October 1999	Doncaster Rovers (5)	0 – 2	Halifax Town (4)	Belle Vue, Doncaster
			Tate 51'; Paterson 82'	Attendance: 5,588; Referee: Graham Barber

30 October 1999	Exeter City (4)	2 – 1	Eastwood Town (7)	St James Park, Exeter
	Flack 40'; Gale 47'; Bradley (yellow card) 65' (red card)		Smith 56'	Attendance: 2,441; Referee: S W Mathieson

30 October 1999	Forest Green Rovers (5)	6 – 0	Guiseley (6)	The Lawn Ground, Nailsworth
	Hunt 1', 31', 62'; McGregor 25'; Drysdale 38'; Sykes 51'		Hogarth (yellow card) 66' (red card)	Attendance: 1,047; Referee: M J Jones

31 October 1999	Hartlepool United (4)	1 – 0	Millwall (3)	Victoria Park, Hartlepool
	Jones 90'			Attendance: 2,847; Referee: J A Kirkby

30 October 1999	Hayes (5)	2 – 1	Runcorn (6)	Church Road, Hayes
	Bunce 25'; Charles 90'		McDonald 45'	Attendance: 890; Referee: Phil Dowd

30 October 1999	Hereford United (5)	1 – 0	York City (4)	Edgar Street, Hereford
	May 77'			Attendance: 2,787; Referee: M Cowburn

30 October 1999	Ilkeston Town (6)	2 – 1	Carlisle United (4)	New Manor Ground, Ilkeston
	Moore 39'; Raynor 62'		Harries 18'	Attendance: 1,748; Referee: Mike Dean

30 October 1999	Leyton Orient (4)	1 – 1	Cardiff City (3)	Brisbane Road, Leyton
	Ampadu 56'; Joseph (red card) 85'		Nugent 39' (pen.)	Attendance: 3,109; Referee: G Cain

9 November 1999 Replay	Cardiff City (3)	3 – 1	Leyton Orient (4)	Ninian Park, Cardiff
	Brazier 22'; Perrett 51'; Nugent 54'		Smith 2'	Attendance: 3,095; Referee: G Cain

30 October 1999	Lincoln City (4)	1 – 0	Welling United (5)	Sincil Bank, Lincoln
	Smith 30'			Attendance: 2,766; Referee: Richard Beeby

30 October 1999	Luton Town (3)	4 – 2	Kingstonian (5)	Kenilworth Road, Luton
	Gray 11'; George 66'; Spring 76'; Taylor 79'		Crossley 35'; Leworthy 47'	Attendance: 4,682; Referee: Phil Joslin

30 October 1999	Macclesfield Town (4)	0 – 0	Hull City (4)	Moss Rose, Macclesfield
				Attendance: 2,401; Referee: P R Richards

9 November 1999 Replay	Hull City (4)	4 – 0	Macclesfield Town (4)	Boothferry Park, Hull
	Eyre 3', 61'; Greaves 7'; Brown 29'			Attendance: 4,844; Referee: P R Richards

2 November 1999	Merthyr Tydfil (6)	2 – 2	Stalybridge Celtic (6)	Penydarren Park, Merthyr Tydfil
	Mitchell 50', 84'		Parr 9'; Sullivan 42'	Attendance: 871

9 November 1999 Replay	Stalybridge Celtic (6)	3 – 1	Merthyr Tydfil (6)	Bower Fold, Stalybridge
	Bauress 2' (pen.); Pickford 24'; Sullivan 86'		Lima 3'	Attendance: 1,399

30 October 1999	Notts County (3)	1 – 1	AFC Bournemouth (3)	Meadow Lane, Nottingham
	Rapley 17'		Warren 53'	Attendance: 3,674; Referee: Jeff Winter

9 November 1999 Replay	AFC Bournemouth (3)	4 – 2	Notts County (3)	Dean Court, Bournemouth
	Fletcher 44', 67'; Robinson 89' (pen.); Stein 89'		Redmile 78'; Tierney 84'	Attendance: 4,026; Referee: Jeff Winter

30 October 1999	Oldham Athletic (3)	4 – 0	Chelmsford City (7)	Boundary Park, Oldham
	Dudley 28'; Sheridan 29'; Duxbury 70'; Whitehall 83'			Attendance: 4,392; Referee: A N Butler

30 October 1999	Oxford United (3)	3 – 2	Morecambe (5)	Manor Ground, Oxford
	Lilley 12'; Powell 58'; Abbey 87'		Wright 28'; Jackson 47'	Attendance: 3,504; Referee: A R Hall

30 October 1999	Peterborough United (4)	1 – 1	Brighton & Hove Albion (4)	London Road, Peterborough
	Clarke 24'		Freeman 35'	Attendance: 7,260; Referee: Neale Barry

9 November 1999 Replay	Brighton & Hove Albion (4)	3 – 0	Peterborough United (4)	Withdean Stadium, Brighton
	Rogers 9'; Watson 63'; Mayo 88'			Attendance: 5,612; Referee: Neale Barry

30 October 1999	Reading (3)	4 – 2	Yeovil Town (5)	Madejski Stadium, Reading
	Bernal 31'; Caskey 63' (pen.); Hunter 80'; Williams 87'		Foster 36'; Eaton 90'	Attendance: 8,032; Referee: Bill Jordan

30 October 1999	Rotherham United (4)	3 – 0	Worthing (7)	Millmoor, Rotherham
	Thompson 31'; Garner 81'; Martindale 90' (pen.)			Attendance: 3,716; Referee: K Hill

29 October 1999	Rushden & Diamonds (5)	2 – 0	Scunthorpe United (3)	Nene Park, Irthlingborough
	Warburton 48'; Hamsher 76' (pen.)			Attendance: 4,112; Referee: G Stretton

30 October 1999	Shrewsbury Town (4)	2 – 1	Northampton Town (4)	Gay Meadow, Shrewsbury
	Kerrigan 24'; Wilding 70'		Hendon 43'	Attendance: 2,584; Referee: M Fletcher

30 October 1999	St Albans City (6)	0 – 2	Bamber Bridge (6)	Clarence Park, St Albans
	Randall (red card) 90'		Whittaker 45'; Carroll 89'; Jones (yellow card) 59' (red card); Maddock (red card) 89'	Attendance: 1,127; Referee: B Curson

30 October 1999	Swansea City (4)	2 – 1	Colchester United (3)	Clarence Park, Swansea
	Cusack 83'; Watkin 89'		LuaLua 52'	Attendance: 3,622; Referee: R D Furnandiz

30 October 1999	Tamworth (6)	2 – 2	Bury (3)	The Lamb Ground, Tamworth
	Haughton 8'; Hallam 75'		Bullock 1'; Littlejohn 68'	Attendance: 2,743; Referee: Alan Kaye

9 November 1999 Replay	Bury (3)	2 – 1 (a.e.t.)	Tamworth (6)	Gigg Lane, Bury
	Billy 86'; James 95'		Haughton 15'	Attendance: 2,531; Referee: Alan Kaye

30 October 1999	Torquay United (4)	1 – 0	Southend United (4)	Plainmoor, Torquay
	O'Brien 75'			Attendance: 2,520; Referee: L Cable

30 October 1999	Whyteleafe (7)	0 – 0	Chester City (4)	Church Road, Whyteleafe
				Attendance: 2,164; Referee: P Taylor

9 November 1999 Replay	Chester City (4)	3 – 1	Whyteleafe (7)	Saunders Honda Stadium, Chester
	Cross 25', 52'; Beckett 48'		Lunn 8' Thornton (red card) 45'	Attendance: 2,183; Referee: P Taylor

30 October 1999	Wrexham (3)	1 – 1	Kettering Town (5)	Racecourse Ground, Wrexham
	Roberts 85'		Brown 48'	Attendance: 2,701; Referee: Alan Wiley

10 November 1999 Replay	Kettering Town (5)	0 – 2	Wrexham (3)	Nene Park, Irthlingborough
			Roberts 11'; Williams 22'	Attendance: 2,611; Referee: Alan Wiley

30 October 1999	Wycombe Wanderers (3)	1 – 1	Oxford City (7)	Adams Park, High Wycombe
	Simpson 67'		Pierson 87'	Attendance: 2,963; Referee: P S Danson

16 November 1999	Oxford City (7)	0 – 1‡	Wycombe Wanderers (3)	Manor Ground, Oxford
			Brown 51'	Attendance: 4,004; Referee: P S Danson

‡ - Oxford City's replay with Wycombe Wanderers was abandoned after extra time due to a fire within the stadium. The score was 1–1.

=== Upsets ===
Giantkiller (tier)	Opponent (tier)
Upset of two or more leagues above
Enfield (level 6)	2–1 away vs Chesterfield (level 3)
Ilkeston Town (level 6)	2–1 at home vs Carlisle United (level 4)
Rushden & Diamonds (level 5)	2–0 at home vs Scunthorpe United (level 3)

== Second round proper ==
- Ties were played over the weekend of 20 and 21 November 1999.
- Replays were played on 30 November 1999.
- Six clubs from the various competitions at Step 6 of English football were the lowest-ranked teams in the draw: Hendon, Bamber Bridge, Aldershot Town, Ilkeston Town, Enfield and Stalybridge Celtic.

20 November 1999	Blackpool (3)	2 – 0	Hendon (6)	Bloomfield Road, Blackpool
	Clarkson 69'; Durnin 73'			Attendance: 2,975; Referee: K A Leach

20 November 1999	AFC Bournemouth (3)	0 – 2	Bristol City (3)	Dean Court, Bournemouth
	Fletcher (yellow card) 71' (red card)		Murray 21', 53'	Attendance: 5,223; Referee: Bill Jordan

20 November 1999	Burnley (3)	2 – 0	Rotherham United (4)	Turf Moor, Burnley
	Cook 67'; Mullin 75'			Attendance: 8,110; Referee: G Laws

20 November 1999	Bury (3)	0 – 0	Cardiff City (3)	Gigg Lane, Bury
				Attendance: 2,603; Referee: Matt Messias

30 November 1999 Replay	Cardiff City (3)	1 – 0 (a.e.t.)	Bury (3)	Ninian Park, Cardiff
	Ford 120'			Attendance: 4,511; Referee: Matt Messias

20 November 1999	Cambridge United (3)	1 – 0	Bamber Bridge (6)	Abbey Stadium, Cambridge
	Butler 71' (pen.)			Attendance: 3,303; Referee: W C Burns

20 November 1999	Exeter City (4)	2 – 0	Aldershot Town (6)	St James Park, Exeter
	Alexander 32'; Flack 35'; Power (yellow card) 64' (red card)			Attendance: 4,151; Referee: C R Wilkes

21 November 1999	Forest Green Rovers (5)	0 – 3	Torquay United (4)	The Lawn Ground, Nailsworth
			Brandon 77'; Hill 81'; Donaldson 87'	Attendance: 2,962; Referee: Phil Joslin

20 November 1999	Gillingham (3)	3 – 1	Darlington (4)^{†}	Priestfield Stadium, Gillingham
	Butters 17'; Taylor 43', 47'		Duffield 55'	Attendance: 5,168; Referee: P Jones

20 November 1999	Hayes (5)	2 – 2	Hull City (4)	Church Road, Hayes
	Charles 21', 63' (pen.)		Watts 4' (o.g.); Edwards 56'; Brabin (red card) 63'	Attendance: 2,749; Referee: Steve Tomlin

30 November 1999 Replay	Hull City (4)	3 – 2 (a.e.t.)	Hayes (5)	Boothferry Park, Hull
	Brown 49'; Edwards 97'; Wood 112'		Gallen 78'; Charles 114'	Attendance: 7,000; Referee: Steve Tomlin

21 November 1999	Hereford United (5)	1 – 0	Hartlepool United (4)	Edgar Street, Hereford
	Elmes 54'			Attendance: 4,914; Referee: Anthony Leake

20 November 1999	Ilkeston Town (6)	1 – 1	Rushden & Diamonds (5)	New Manor Ground, Ilkeston
	Eshelby 18'		de Souza 51'	Attendance: 2,737; Referee: A R Hall

30 November 1999 Replay	Rushden & Diamonds (5)	3 – 0	Ilkeston Town (6)	Nene Park, Irthlingborough
	Wooding 2'; Town 17'; Collins 86'		Knapper (red card) 74'	Attendance: 4,226; Referee: A R Hall

19 November 1999	Luton Town (3)	2 – 2	Lincoln City (4)	Kenilworth Road, Luton
	Doherty 63', 84'		Gordon 14'; Barnett 81'	Attendance: 4,291; Referee: Stephen Lodge

30 November 1999 Replay	Lincoln City (4)	0 – 1	Luton Town (3)	Sincil Bank, Lincoln
			Douglas 85'	Attendance: 3,822; Referee: Stephen Lodge

20 November 1999	Oldham Athletic (3)	1 – 0	Swansea City (4)	Boundary Park, Oldham
	Whitehall 45'			Attendance: 4,332; Referee: M Fletcher

20 November 1999	Plymouth Argyle (4)	0 – 0	Brighton & Hove Albion (4)	Home Park, Plymouth
			Freeman (red card) 61'; Cullip (yellow card) 76' (red card)	Attendance: 7,414; Referee: Rob Harris

30 November 1999 Replay	Brighton & Hove Albion (4)	1 – 2	Plymouth Argyle (4)	Withdean Stadium, Brighton
	Cullip 63'		Bastow 9'; Hargreaves 65'	Attendance: 5,710; Referee: Stephen Lodge

20 November 1999	Preston North End (3)	0 – 0	Enfield (6)	Deepdale, Preston
				Attendance: 11,566; Referee: P Rejer

30 November 1999 Replay	Enfield (6)	0 – 3	Preston North End (3)	Clarence Park, St Albans
	Protheroe (red card) 60'		Eyres 52'; Alexander 60' (pen.); Gunnlaugsson 83'	Attendance: 1,808; Referee: P Rejer

20 November 1999	Reading (3)	1 – 1	Halifax Town (4)	Madejski Stadium, Reading
	Caskey 75' (pen.); Parkinson (yellow card) 39' (red card)		Mitchell 60'	Attendance: 5,918; Referee: Richard Beeby

30 November 1999 Replay	Halifax Town (4)	0 – 1	Reading (3)	The Shay, Halifax
			Caskey 74' (pen.); Polston (red card) 90'	Attendance: 2,156; Referee: Richard Beeby

20 November 1999	Shrewsbury Town (4)	2 – 2	Oxford United (3)	Gay Meadow, Shrewsbury
	Kerrigan 8', 54'		Murphy 63'; Folland 77'	Attendance: 3,357; Referee: T Jones

30 November 1999 Replay	Oxford United (3)	2 – 1 (a.e.t.)	Shrewsbury Town (4)	Manor Ground, Oxford
	Murphy 90', 117'		Jagielka 27'	Attendance: 4,096; Referee: T Jones

20 November 1999	Stalybridge Celtic (6)	1 – 2	Chester City (4)	Bower Fold, Stalybridge
	Scott 8'; Parr (yellow card) 90' (red card)		Cross 45'; Beckett 69'	Attendance: 3,312; Referee: Michael Ryan

20 November 1999	Wrexham (3)	2 – 1	Rochdale (4)	Racecourse Ground, Wrexham
	Roberts 5'; Faulconbridge 88'		Atkinson 33'	Attendance: 3,408; Referee: Trevor Parkes

20 November 1999	Wycombe Wanderers (3)	2 – 2	Wigan Athletic (3)	Adams Park, High Wycombe
	Devine 20'; Ryan 90'		Haworth 45', 61'	Attendance: 2,992; Referee: R Olivier

30 November 1999 Replay	Wigan Athletic (3)	2 – 1	Wycombe Wanderers (3)	JJB Stadium, Wigan
	Liddell 28'; Haworth 80'		Baird 23'	Attendance: 3,967; Referee: R Olivier

^† = Darlington advanced as lucky losers

== Third round proper ==
This round marked the first time First Division and Premier League (top-flight) teams played.

- Matches were played on the weekend of 11 and 12 December 1999.
- Replays were played on 21 and 22 December 1999.
- Two Second Division sides defeated Premier League opponents: Burnley beat Derby County 1-0 at Pride Park, and Wrexham defeated Middlesbrough 2-1 at the Racecourse Ground.
- Conference National (Step 5) sides Hereford United and Rushden & Diamonds were the lowest-ranked teams in the draw.

13 December 1999	Arsenal (1)	3 – 1	Blackpool (3)	Highbury, London
	Grimandi 23'; Adams 65'; Overmars 89'		Clarkson 38'	Attendance: 34,143; Referee: Uriah Rennie

11 December 1999	Aston Villa (1)	2 – 1	Darlington (4)	Villa Park, Birmingham
	Carbone 43'; Dublin 63'		Heckingbottom 71'	Attendance: 22,101; Referee: P R Richards

21 December 1999	Bolton Wanderers (2)	1 – 0	Cardiff City (3)	Reebok Stadium, Bolton
	Guðjohnsen 29'			Attendance: 5,734; Referee: G Laws

10 December 1999	Cambridge United (3)	2 – 0	Crystal Palace (2)	Abbey Stadium, Cambridge
	Benjamin 74'; Wanless 81'		Mullins (yellow card) 84' (red card)	Attendance: 5,631; Referee: P Taylor

11 December 1999	Charlton Athletic (2)	2 – 1	Swindon Town (2)	The Valley, London
	Kinsella 48', 61'		Gooden 64'	Attendance: 10,939; Referee: A N Butler

12 December 1999	Chester City (4)	1 – 4	Manchester City (2)	Saunders Honda Stadium, Chester
	Richardson 27'		Goater 19', 90'; Bishop 78'; Doughty 90' (o.g.)	Attendance: 5,469; Referee: T Heilbron

11 December 1999	Crewe Alexandra (2)	1 – 2	Bradford City (1)	Alexandra Stadium, Crewe
	Little 75'		Blake 53'; Saunders 83'	Attendance: 6,571; Referee: Alan Wilkie

11 December 1999	Derby County (1)	0 – 1	Burnley (3)	Pride Park, Derby
			Cooke 62'	Attendance: 23,400; Referee: Mike Riley

11 December 1999	Exeter City (4)	0 – 0	Everton (1)	St James Park, Exeter
				Attendance: 6,045; Referee: Steve Bennett

21 December 1999 Replay	Everton (1)	1 – 0	Exeter City (4)	Goodison Park, Liverpool
	Barmby 85'			Attendance: 16,869; Referee: Steve Bennett

11 December 1999	Fulham (2)	2 – 2	Luton Town (3)	Craven Cottage, London
	Horsfield 11'; Davis 14'		George 6'; Spring 82'	Attendance: 8,251; Referee: G B Frankland

21 December 1999 Replay	Luton Town (3)	0 – 3	Fulham (2)	Kenilworth Road, Luton
			Hayles 57', 60'; Hayward 63'	Attendance: 8,170; Referee: G B Frankland

11 December 1999	Grimsby Town (2)	3 – 2	Stockport County (2)	Blundell Park, Cleethorpes
	Livingstone 57', 60'; Bradley Allen 63'			Attendance: 3,400

11 December 1999	Hereford United (5)	0 – 0	Leicester City (1)	Edgar Street, Hereford
				Attendance: 7,795; Referee: Mike Dean

22 December 1999 Replay	Leicester City (1)	2 – 1 (a.e.t.)	Hereford United (5)	Filbert Street, Leicester
	Elliott 78'; Izzet 104'		Fewings 40'	Attendance: 12,157; Referee: Mike Dean

12 December 1999	Huddersfield Town (2)	0 – 2	Liverpool (1)	Alfred McAlpine Stadium, Huddersfield
		Report	Camara 36'; Matteo 59'	Attendance: 23,678; Referee: Rob Harris

11 December 1999	Hull City (4)	1 – 6	Chelsea (1)	Boothferry Park, Hull
	Brown 38'		Poyet 8', 49', 58'; Sutton 39'; Di Matteo 47'; Edwards 90' (o.g.)	Attendance: 10,279; Referee: P Jones

13 December 1999	Ipswich Town (2)	0 – 1	Southampton (1)	Portman Road, Ipswich
			Richards 40'	Attendance: 14,383; Referee: Graham Barber

12 December 1999	Leeds United (1)	2 – 0	Port Vale (2)	Elland Road, Leeds
	Bakke 61', 68'			Attendance: 11,912; Referee: Steve Dunn

11 December 1999	Norwich City (2)	1 – 3	Coventry City (1)	Carrow Road, Norwich
	Llewellyn 66'		Whelan 58'; Roussel 76'; Eustace 84'	Attendance: 15,702; Referee: Paul Alcock

10 December 1999	Nottingham Forest (2)	1 – 1	Oxford United (3)	City Ground, Nottingham
	Llewellyn 66'		Whelan 58'	Attendance: 8,079; Referee: Andy D'Urso

8 January 2000 Replay	Oxford United (3)	1 – 3	Nottingham Forest (2)	Manor Ground, Oxford
	Powell 72'; Lundin (red card)		Bart-Williams 81', 83' (pen.); Rogers 89'	Attendance: 7,191; Referee: Andy D'Urso

11 December 1999	Preston North End (3)	2 – 1	Oldham Athletic (3)	Deepdale, Preston
	Macken 6'; Alexander 69' (pen.)		Adams 85'; Hotte (red card) 69'	Attendance: 9,940; Referee: Paul Danson

11 December 1999	Queens Park Rangers (2)	1 – 1	Torquay United (4)	Loftus Road, London
	Wardley 9'		O'Brien 82'	Attendance: 8,843; Referee: K A Leach

21 December 1999 Replay	Torquay United (4)	2 – 3	Queens Park Rangers (2)	Plainmoor, Torquay
	Bedeau 52'; Thomas 80'		Wardley 56', 74'; Kiwomya 71'	Attendance: 5,232; Referee: K A Leach

11 December 1999	Reading (3)	1 – 1	Plymouth Argyle (4)	Madejski Stadium, Reading
	McIntyre 37'		Hargreaves 82'	Attendance: 8,536; Referee: Alan Wiley

21 December 1999 Replay	Plymouth Argyle (4)	1 – 0	Reading (3)	Home Park, Plymouth
	Heathcote 88'		Smith (yellow card) 39' (red card)	Attendance: 8,965; Referee: Alan Wiley

12 December 1999	Sheffield United (2)	1 – 1	Rushden & Diamonds (5)	Bramall Lane, Sheffield
	Bent 14'		Brady 45'	Attendance: 10,104; Referee: B Knight

21 December 1999 Replay	Rushden & Diamonds (5)	1 – 1 (a.e.t.) (5-6 p)	Sheffield United (2)	Nene Park, Irthlingborough
	Warburton 105'		Derry 103'	Attendance: 6,010; Referee: B Knight

11 December 1999	Sheffield Wednesday (1)	1 – 0	Bristol City (3)	Hillsborough, Sheffield
	Booth 24'; Quinn (red card) 90'			Attendance: 11,644; Referee: M Reed

11 December 1999	Sunderland (1)	1 – 0	Portsmouth (2)	Stadium of Light, Sunderland
	McCann 24'		Panopoulos (yellow card) 40' (red card)	Attendance: 26,535; Referee: Neale Barry

12 December 1999	Tottenham Hotspur (1)	1 – 1	Newcastle United (1)	White Hart Lane, London
	Iversen 57'		Speed 77'	Attendance: 33,116; Referee: Graham Poll

22 December 1999 Replay	Newcastle United (1)	6 – 1	Tottenham Hotspur (1)	St James' Park, Newcastle
	Speed 5'; Dabizas 27'; Ferguson 45'; Dyer 73'; Shearer 83' (pen.), 85'		Ginola 34'	Attendance: 35,415; Referee: Graham Poll

11 December 1999	Tranmere Rovers (2)	1 – 0	West Ham United (1)	Prenton Park, Birkenhead
	Henry 21'			Attendance: 13,629; Referee: Dermot Gallagher

11 December 1999	Walsall (2)	1 – 1	Gillingham (3)	Bescot Stadium, Walsall
	Robins 75' (pen.)		Southall 27'	Attendance: 4,314; Referee: Eddie Wolstenholme

8 January 2000 Replay	Gillingham (3)	2 – 1 (a.e.t.)	Walsall (2)	Priestfield Stadium, Gillingham
	Barras 38' (o.g.); Thomson 100'		Lárusson 44'	Attendance: 6,538; Referee: Eddie Wolstenholme

11 December 1999	Watford (1)	0 – 1	Birmingham City (2)	Vicarage Road, Watford
			Rowett 66'	Attendance: 8,144; Referee: Paul Durkin

11 December 1999	West Bromwich Albion (2)	2 – 2	Blackburn Rovers (2)	The Hawthorns, West Bromwich
	Hughes 66'; Evans 80'		Frandsen 65'; Blake 70'	Attendance: 10,609; Referee: Rob Styles

22 December 1999 Replay	Blackburn Rovers (2)	2 – 0 (a.e.t.)	West Bromwich Albion (2)	Ewood Park, Blackburn
	Duff 94'; Carsley 114' (pen.)			Attendance: 11,766; Referee: Rob Styles

11 December 1999	Wigan Athletic (3)	0 – 1	Wolverhampton Wanderers (2)	JJB Stadium, Wigan
			Robinson 90'	Attendance: 10,531; Referee: C Wilkes

11 December 1999	Wimbledon (1)	1 – 0	Barnsley (2)	Selhurst Park, London
	Cort 34'			Attendance: 4,505; Referee: Mark Halsey

11 December 1999	Wrexham (3)	2 – 1	Middlesbrough (1)	Racecourse Ground, Wrexham
	Gibson 50'; Ferguson 68'	Report	Deane 42'	Attendance: 11,755; Referee: Stephen Lodge

== Fourth round proper ==
- Ties played on weekend of 8 and 9 January 2000.
- Replays played on 18 and 19 January 2000.
- Second Division side Gillingham qualified for the Fifth Round for the first time in 30 years after defeating Premier League opponents Bradford City 3-1 at Priestfield.
- Plymouth Argyle, from the Third Division, was the lowest-ranked team in the draw.

10 January 2000	Liverpool (1)	0–1	Blackburn Rovers (2)	Anfield, Liverpool
		Report	Blake 84'	Attendance: 32,839; Referee: Graham Poll

11 January 2000	Gillingham (3)	3–1	Bradford City (1)	Priestfield Stadium, Gillingham
	Thomson 39'; Ashby 54'; Hodge 78'	Report	Saunders 77'	Attendance: 7,091; Referee: Dermot Gallagher

8 January 2000	Aston Villa (1)	1–0	Southampton (1)	Villa Park, Birmingham
	Southgate 20'	Report		Attendance: 25,025; Referee: Neale Barry

8 January 2000	Sheffield Wednesday (1)	1–1	Wolverhampton Wanderers (2)	Hillsborough, Sheffield
	Alexandersson 9'	Report	Sedgley 68'	Attendance: 18,506; Referee: Graham Barber

18 January 2000 Replay	Wolverhampton Wanderers (2)	0–0 (a.e.t.) (3–4 p)	Sheffield Wednesday (1)	Hillsborough, Sheffield
		Report		Attendance: 25,201; Referee: Graham Barber
	Penalties
	Curle (penalty scored); Simpson (penalty missed); Branch (penalty missed); Sedgley (penalty scored); Corica (penalty scored)		Hinchcliffe (penalty scored); Jonk (penalty scored); Sibon (penalty scored); Cresswell (penalty missed); Donnelly (penalty scored)

8 January 2000	Grimsby Town (2)	0–2	Bolton Wanderers (2)	Blundell Park, Grimsby
			Guðjohnsen 33'; Hansen 54'	Attendance: 4,270; Referee: K M Lynch

8 January 2000	Everton (1)	2–0	Birmingham City (2)	Goodison Park, Liverpool
	Unsworth 75' (pen.), 90' (pen.)	Report		Attendance: 25,405; Referee: David Elleray

8 January 2000	Wrexham (3)	1–2	Cambridge United (3)	Racecourse Ground, Wrexham
	Connolly 44'		Benjamin 15'; Butler 52'	Attendance: 7,186; Referee: Ray Olivier

8 January 2000	Tranmere Rovers (2)	1–0	Sunderland (1)	Prenton Park, Birkenhead
	Allison 25'; Hill (yellow card) 90' (red card)	Report		Attendance: 17,344; Referee: Rob Harris

8 January 2000	Newcastle United (1)	4–1	Sheffield United (2)	St James' Park, Newcastle
	Shearer 5'; Dabizas 47'; Ferguson 59'; Gallacher 69'	Report	Smith 17'	Attendance: 36,220; Referee: Mark Halsey

9 January 2000	Manchester City (2)	2–5	Leeds United (1)	Maine Road, Manchester
	Goater 2'; Bishop 11'	Report	Bakke 8'; Smith 20'; Kewell 41', 88'; Bowyer 66'	Attendance: 29,240; Referee: Dermot Gallagher

8 January 2000	Fulham (2)	3–0	Wimbledon (1)	Craven Cottage, London
	Collins 22', 77'; Finnan 25'	Report		Attendance: 16,877; Referee: Jeff Winter

8 January 2000	Coventry City (1)	3–0	Burnley (3)	Highfield Road, Coventry
	Chippo 11', 69'; Whelan 75'	Report		Attendance: 22,774; Referee: Stephen Lodge

8 January 2000	Plymouth Argyle (4)	0–3	Preston North End (3)	Home Park, Plymouth
			O'Sullivan 39' (o.g.); Alexander 60' (pen.); Beswetherick 77' (o.g.)	Attendance: 10,824; Referee: Paul Durkin

19 January 2000	Chelsea (1)	2–0	Nottingham Forest (2)	Stamford Bridge, London
	Leboeuf 57'; Wise 86'	Report		Attendance: 30,125; Referee: David Elleray

8 January 2000	Charlton Athletic (2)	1–0	Queens Park Rangers (2)	The Valley, London
	MacDonald 68'		Plummer (yellow card) 67' (red card)	Attendance: 16,798; Referee: Rob Styles

9 January 2000	Arsenal (1)	0–0	Leicester City (1)	Highbury, London
		Report	Eadie (yellow card) 81' (red card)	Attendance: 35,710; Referee: Mike Riley

19 January 2000 Replay	Leicester City (1)	0–0 (a.e.t.) (6–5 p)	Arsenal (1)	Filbert Street, Leicester
		Report		Attendance: 15,235; Referee: Mike Riley
	Penalties
	Gunnlaugsson (penalty scored); Savage (penalty scored); Fenton (penalty scored); Elliott (penalty scored); Oakes (penalty missed); Campbell (penalty scored); Heskey (penalty scored)		(penalty scored) Šuker; (penalty missed) Dixon; (penalty scored) Hughes; (penalty scored) Parlour; (penalty scored) Henry; (penalty scored) Vieira; (penalty missed) Grimandi

== Fifth round proper ==
- Ties played on weekend of 29 and 30 January 2000.
- The shock result of the round came when Gillingham (who had yet to play in the top two tiers of English football) defeated Premier League side Sheffield Wednesday 3–1 to qualify for the Cup quarter-finals for the first time in their history.

29 January 2000	Gillingham (3)	3–1	Sheffield Wednesday (1)	Priestfield Stadium, Gillingham
	Saunders 70'; Thomson 72'; Southall 82'	Report	Sibon 27'	Attendance: 10,130; Referee: M D Reed

31 January 2000	Blackburn Rovers (2)	1–2	Newcastle United (1)	Ewood Park, Blackburn
	Jansen 25'	Report	Shearer 21', 79'	Attendance: 29,946; Referee: Paul Durkin

30 January 2000	Aston Villa (1)	3–2	Leeds United (1)	Villa Park, Birmingham
	Carbone 32', 58', 69'	Report	Harte 13'; Bakke 38'	Attendance: 30,026; Referee: Graham Barber

29 January 2000	Everton (1)	2–0	Preston North End (3)	Goodison Park, Liverpool
	Unsworth 64'; Moore 90'	Report		Attendance: 37,486; Referee: Mike Riley

29 January 2000	Fulham (2)	1–2	Tranmere Rovers (2)	Craven Cottage, London
	Coleman 18'	Report	Allison 9'; Kelly 70'	Attendance: 13,859; Referee: David Elleray

29 January 2000	Coventry City (1)	2–3	Charlton Athletic (2)	Highfield Road, Coventry
	Roussel 15', 21'	Report	Robinson 40'; Newton 45'; Hunt 88'	Attendance: 23,400; Referee: Dermot Gallagher

30 January 2000	Chelsea (1)	2–1	Leicester City (1)	Stamford Bridge, London
	Poyet 35'; Weah 48'	Report	Elliott 90'	Attendance: 30,141; Referee: Graham Poll

29 January 2000	Cambridge United (3)	1–3	Bolton Wanderers (2)	Abbey Stadium, Cambridge
	Benjamin 29'	Report	Taylor 53', 75'; Guðjohnsen 86'	Attendance: 7,523; Referee: M J Brandwood

== Sixth round proper ==
19 February 2000
15:00

Bolton Wanderers (2)	1–0	Charlton Athletic (2)
Guðjohnsen 47'	Report

Reebok Stadium, Bolton
Attendance: 20,131
Referee: Graham Poll

20 February 2000
16:00

Everton (1)	1–2	Aston Villa (1)
Moore 20'	Report	Stone 16'; Carbone 45'

Goodison Park, Liverpool
Attendance: 35,331
Referee: Dermot Gallagher

20 February 2000
14:00

Tranmere Rovers (2)	2–3	Newcastle United (1)
Allison 45'; Jones 76'	Report	Speed 27'; Domi 36'; Ferguson 58'

Prenton Park, Birkenhead
Attendance: 15,776
Referee: Steve Dunn

20 February 2000
15:00

Chelsea (1)	5–0	Gillingham (3)
Flo 16'; Terry 49'; Weah 50'; Zola 85' (pen.); Morris 88'	Report

Stamford Bridge, Fulham, West London
Attendance: 34,205
Referee: Paul Durkin

== Semi-finals ==
Aston Villa booked their first FA Cup final appearance since 1957 by beating Bolton Wanderers on penalties after a goalless draw after extra time, while Chelsea reached their second final in four years with a narrow 2–1 win over Newcastle United (who had been finalists in the previous two seasons).

2 April 2000
15:00

Aston Villa (1)	0–0	Bolton Wanderers (2)
	Report

Wembley Stadium, London
Attendance: 62,828
Referee: David Elleray
- Aston Villa win 4–1 on penalties, after extra time. Steve Stone, Lee Hendrie, Gareth Barry and Dion Dublin all scored for Aston Villa. Dean Holdsworth scored for Bolton.

9 April 2000
15:00

Chelsea (1)	2–1	Newcastle United (1)
Poyet 17', 72'	Report	Lee 66'

Wembley Stadium, London
Attendance: 73,876
Referee: Dermot Gallagher

== Final ==
The 2000 FA Cup final was contested between Chelsea and Aston Villa at Wembley Stadium, with Chelsea coming out 1-0 winners. Roberto Di Matteo scored the winning goal 17 minutes from the end, three years after he had opened the scoring within the first minute of Chelsea's last FA Cup final win. This was Villa's first FA Cup final for 43 years.

20 May 2000
15:00 BST

Chelsea	1–0	Aston Villa
Di Matteo 73'	(Report)

Wembley, London
Attendance: 78,217
Referee: Graham Poll (Hertfordshire)

Chelsea	Aston Villa

== Media coverage ==
In the United Kingdom, ITV were the free to air broadcasters for the third consecutive season while Sky Sports were the subscription broadcasters for the twelfth consecutive season.

The matches shown live on ITV Sport were:

- Huddersfield Town 0-2 Liverpool (R3)
- Arsenal 0-0 Leicester City (R4)
- Aston Villa 3-2 Leeds United (R5)
- Tranmere Rovers 2-3 Newcastle United (QF)
- Bolton Wanderers 0-0 Aston Villa (SF)
- Chelsea 1-0 Aston Villa (Final)

The matches shown live on Sky Sports were:

- Rushden & Diamonds 2-0 Scunthorpe United (R1)
- Barnet 0-1 Burnley (R1)
- Kettering Town 0-2 Wrexham (R1 Replay)
- Luton Town 2-2 Lincoln City (R2)
- Hereford United 1-0 Hartlepool United (R2)
- Lincoln City 0-1 Luton Town (R2 Replay)
- Tottenham Hotspur 1-1 Newcastle United (R3)
- Ipswich Town 0-1 Southampton (R3)
- Newcastle United 6-1 Tottenham Hotspur (R3 Replay)
- Manchester City 2-5 Leeds United (R4)
- Liverpool 0-1 Blackburn Rovers (R4)
- Leicester City 0-0 Arsenal (R4 Replay)
- Chelsea 2-1 Leicester City (R5)
- Blackburn Rovers 1-2 Newcastle United (R5)
- Everton 1-2 Aston Villa (QF)
- Chelsea 2-1 Newcastle United (SF)
- Chelsea 1-0 Aston Villa (Final)
