= 1996–97 Notts County F.C. season =

Notts County
1996–97 season
- Chairman: Derek Pavis
- Manager: Colin Murphy (until 23 December); Mark Smith (caretaker, 23 December - 16 January); Sam Allardyce (from 16 January)
- Stadium: Meadow Lane
- Second Division: 24th (relegated)
- FA Cup: Third round
- League Cup: First round
- Auto Windscreens Shield: Second round
- Top goalscorer: League: Martindale (6); All: Martindale (7)
- Average home league attendance: 4,239

During the 1996–97 English football season, Notts County F.C. competed in the Football League Second Division.

== Season summary ==
In the 1996–97 season, it was a disaster for Murphy and the club, with a series of heavy defeats that eventually led to his sacking on 23 December 1996. On 16 January 1997, Sam Allardyce made his return to football as manager but he arrived too late to save them from relegation.

== Final league table ==
Pos	Team	Pld	W	D	L	GF	GA	GD	Pts	Promotion or relegation
20	York City	46	13	13	20	47	68	−21	52	
21	Peterborough United (R)	46	11	14	21	55	73	−18	47	Relegation to the Third Division
22	Shrewsbury Town (R)	46	11	13	22	49	74	−25	46	Relegation to the Third Division
23	Rotherham United (R)	46	7	14	25	39	70	−31	35	Relegation to the Third Division
24	Notts County (R)	46	7	14	25	33	59	−26	35	Relegation to the Third Division

Rules for classification: In the Football League goals scored (GF) takes precedence over goal difference (GD).
(R) Relegated

== Results ==
Notts County's score comes first

=== Legend ===
Win	Draw	Loss

=== Football League Second Division ===
Date	Opponent	Venue	Result	Attendance	Scorers
17 August 1996	Preston North End	H	2–1	6,879	Jones, Martindale
24 August 1996	Stockport County	A	0–0	5,271	
31 August 1996	York City	H	0–1	4,600	
7 September 1996	Plymouth Argyle	A	0–0	8,109	
10 September 1996	Watford	H	2–3	3,660	Martindale (pen), Robinson
14 September 1996	Millwall	H	1–2	4,473	Baraclough
21 September 1996	Bournemouth	A	1–0	3,402	Jones
28 September 1996	Wrexham	H	0–0	4,216	
1 October 1996	Gillingham	A	0–1	5,482	
5 October 1996	Wycombe Wanderers	A	0–1	4,506	
8 October 1996	Peterborough United	A	3–1	5,456	Agana, Heald (own goal), Martindale
12 October 1996	Bristol Rovers	H	1–1	4,558	Agana
15 October 1996	Chesterfield	H	0–0	4,265	
19 October 1996	Burnley	A	0–1	9,372	
26 October 1996	Bristol City	A	0–4	9,540	
29 October 1996	Walsall	H	2–0	3,127	Strodder, Agana
2 November 1996	Shrewsbury Town	H	1–2	4,363	Derry
9 November 1996	Luton Town	A	0–2	5,664	
23 November 1996	Blackpool	A	0–1	3,598	
30 November 1996	Bristol City	H	2–0	4,693	Arkins, Robinson
3 December 1996	Brentford	A	0–2	3,675	
14 December 1996	Rotherham United	H	0–0	3,954	
20 December 1996	Crewe Alexandra	A	0–3	3,125	
26 December 1996	Watford	A	0–0	9,065	
11 January 1997	Wrexham	A	3–3	3,267	Farrell, Martindale (2, 1 pen)
18 January 1997	Gillingham	H	1–1	5,008	Martindale (pen)
25 January 1997	Walsall	A	1–3	3,261	Battersby
1 February 1997	Luton Town	H	1–2	5,025	Richardson
4 February 1997	Bournemouth	H	0–2	2,757	
8 February 1997	Shrewsbury Town	A	1–2	2,692	Regis
15 February 1997	Blackpool	H	1–1	5,281	Butler (own goal)
22 February 1997	Bury	A	0–2	3,430	
25 February 1997	Millwall	A	0–1	5,202	
1 March 1997	Brentford	H	1–1	4,323	Strodder
8 March 1997	Crewe Alexandra	H	0–1	4,047	
15 March 1997	Rotherham United	A	2–2	2,605	Regis, Redmile
22 March 1997	Stockport County	H	1–2	4,238	Baraclough
25 March 1997	Bury	H	0–1	3,306	
29 March 1997	Preston North End	A	0–2	9,472	
31 March 1997	Peterborough United	H	0–0	3,848	
5 April 1997	York City	A	2–1	3,115	Dudley, Redmile
12 April 1997	Wycombe Wanderers	H	1–2	4,290	Derry
15 April 1997	Plymouth Argyle	H	2–1	2,423	Heathcote (own goal), Jones
20 April 1997	Bristol Rovers	A	0–1	6,309	
26 April 1997	Burnley	H	1–1	4,591	Dudley
3 May 1997	Chesterfield	A	0–1	5,736	

=== FA Cup ===
Round	Date	Opponent	Venue	Result	Attendance	Goalscorers
R1	17 November 1996	Newcastle Town	A	2–0	3,918	Kennedy, Robinson
R2	7 December 1996	Rochdale	H	3–1	3,584	Jones, Arkins, Agana
R3	14 January 1997	Aston Villa	H	0–0	13,315	
R3R	22 January 1997	Aston Villa	A	0–3	25,006	

=== League Cup ===
Round	Date	Opponent	Venue	Result	Attendance	Goalscorers
R1 1st Leg	20 August 1996	Bury	H	1–1	2,141	Jones
R1 2nd Leg	3 September 1996	Bury	A	0–1 (lost 1–2 on agg)	2,571	

=== Football League Trophy ===
Round	Date	Opponent	Venue	Result	Attendance	Goalscorers
NR1	10 December 1996	Scarborough	A	1–0	952	Martindale (pen)
NR2	28 January 1997	Scunthorpe United	A	1–1 (lost 2–4 on pens)	1,076	Hunt

== Squad ==
Note: Flags indicate national team as defined under FIFA eligibility rules; some limited exceptions apply. Players may hold more than one non-FIFA nationality.

No.	Pos.	Nation	Player
—	GK	(Wales) WAL	Darren Ward
—	GK	(England) ENG	Mike Pollitt
—	DF	(England) ENG	Ian Baraclough
—	DF	(Republic of Ireland) IRL	Steve Finnan
—	DF	(England) ENG	Tommy Gallagher
—	DF	(England) ENG	Ian Hendon
—	DF	(England) ENG	Graeme Hogg
—	DF	(England) ENG	Craig Ludlam (on loan from Sheffield Wednesday)
—	DF	(England) ENG	Paul Mitchell
—	DF	(Australia) AUS	Shaun Murphy
—	DF	(England) ENG	Matt Redmile
—	DF	(England) ENG	Ian Richardson
—	DF	(England) ENG	Gary Strodder
—	DF	(England) ENG	Richard Walker
—	DF	(England) ENG	Chris Wilder
—	MF	(England) ENG	Shaun Cunnington
—	MF	(England) ENG	Shaun Derry
—	MF	(England) ENG	Wayne Diuk
—	MF	(England) ENG	Mick Galloway

No.	Pos.	Nation	Player
—	MF	(England) ENG	James Hunt
—	MF	(Northern Ireland) NIR	Peter Kennedy
—	MF	(Australia) AUS	Gabriel Mendez (on loan from Parramatta Power)
—	MF	(England) ENG	Ian Ridgway
—	MF	(England) ENG	Phil Robinson
—	MF	(England) ENG	Paul Rogers
—	MF	(England) ENG	Michael Simpson
—	FW	(England) ENG	Tony Agana
—	FW	(Republic of Ireland) IRL	Vinny Arkins
—	FW	(England) ENG	Tony Battersby
—	FW	(England) ENG	Craig Dudley
—	FW	(England) ENG	Sean Farrell
—	FW	(England) ENG	Gary Jones
—	FW	(England) ENG	Gary Martindale
—	FW	(Wales) WAL	Lee Nogan (on loan from Reading)
—	FW	(England) ENG	Dave Regis (on loan from Barnsley)
—	FW	(England) ENG	Devon White
—	FW	(England) ENG	Tim Wilkes
