= John Still (footballer) =

English football player and manager (born 1950)

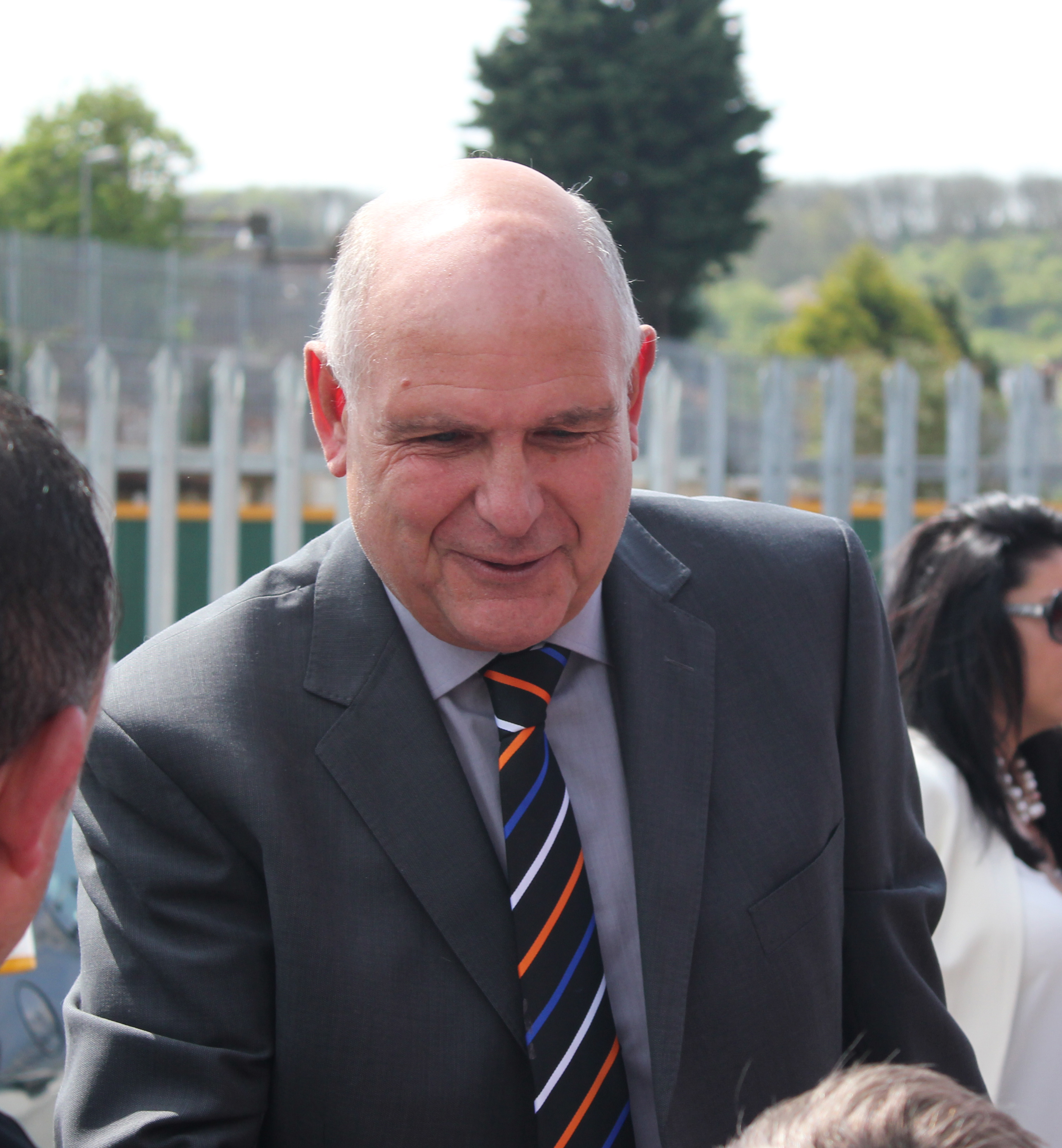
- Still in 2014, as manager of Luton Town

Personal information
- Full name: John Leonard Still
- Date of birth: 24 April 1950 (age 76)
- Place of birth: West Ham, England
- Position: Defender

Youth career
- 1966–1967: Leyton Orient

Senior career*
Years	Team	Apps	(Gls)
1967–1970	Leyton Orient	1	(0)
1970–1972	Bishop's Stortford	16	(0)
1972–1974	Leytonstone	18	(0)
1974–1976	Dagenham	1	(0)
Total		36	(0)

Managerial career
- 1976–1979: Leytonstone
- 1979–1983: Leytonstone/Ilford
- 1983–1986: Dartford
- 1986: Leytonstone/Ilford
- 1986–1989: Maidstone United
- 1989–1992: Redbridge Forest
- 1992–1994: Dagenham & Redbridge
- 1994–1995: Peterborough United
- 1997–2000: Barnet
- 2001–2002: Barnet
- 2004–2013: Dagenham & Redbridge
- 2013–2015: Luton Town
- 2015–2018: Dagenham & Redbridge
- 2018: Barnet
- 2019–2020: Maidstone United
- * Club domestic league appearances and goals

John Leonard Still (born 24 April 1950) is an English former footballer and manager. He is currently Head of Football for National League South side Chelmsford City.

After his playing career was cut short by injury, Still began managing non-League clubs around his hometown area of East London, Essex and Kent, achieving title wins and promotions with Leytonstone/Ilford, Dartford, Maidstone United and Redbridge Forest. He was manager of Redbridge Forest when the club merged with Dagenham in 1992 to become its current incarnation – Dagenham & Redbridge. Still accepted his first job in the Football League in August 1994 at Peterborough United, but was sacked a year later. He joined Barnet in June 1997 and took the club to the play-offs twice, before leaving in 2002 after the club was relegated to the Football Conference. Still returned to Dagenham & Redbridge in April 2004, guiding the club to promotion to League Two in 2006–07 and then to League One three years later. In February 2013, after nine seasons in charge, Still left Dagenham and dropped down a league to join Luton Town. In his first full season as Luton manager, the club were crowned as Conference Premier champions and won promotion to League Two, making Still the only manager to lead three clubs to promotion out of non-League football. He led Luton to an eighth-placed finish in League Two in 2014–15, before leaving the club in December 2015. Still rejoined Dagenham for a third term as manager on 31 December 2015.

== Playing career ==
Born in West Ham, Essex, Still joined Leyton Orient as a youth player, signing as an amateur for them in May 1967. He made his league debut the following season, playing at centre-back against Torquay United, but that proved to be his only league appearance before being released, having injured his knee in the game. He later moved into non-League football with Bishop's Stortford, Leytonstone and Dagenham. Still's playing career was ended despite surgery on his injured knee and he began coaching, while also working part-time as a salesman.

== Management career ==
=== Part-time career ===
Still's first managerial job came with Leytonstone in 1976, which merged with Ilford three years later to become Leytonstone/Ilford. He took the club to their first Isthmian League title in 1981–82. In 1983, Still joined Dartford as manager, where he won the Southern League title before returning to Leytonstone/Ilford for a short time. His next post came in 1986 at Maidstone United, which he guided to the Football Conference title and promotion to the Football League in 1989. Still resigned as Maidstone manager soon after, having no desire to move into a full-time coaching role, and moved to Isthmian League club Redbridge Forest, which had been formed in 1989 by a merger of his former club Leytonstone/Ilford and Walthamstow Avenue. He guided Redbridge to the Isthmian League title, and with it promotion to the Conference in 1990–91. Still took Redbridge to a seventh-placed finish in the next season and remained with the club as it yet again merged, this time with Dagenham to become Dagenham & Redbridge, in the summer of 1992. The club finished third in 1992–93 and sixth in 1993–94.

=== Peterborough United ===
In August 1994, Still accepted the manager's role at recently relegated Second Division club Peterborough United. In his first season in charge, Still led the club to a 15th-placed finish. He was sacked by the club on 24 October 1995 after winning only three of Peterborough's first 13 league matches of 1995–96. While at Peterborough, he gave debuts to players such as Adam Drury, Giuliano Grazioli and Mark Tyler.

=== Barnet ===
After leaving Peterborough, Still became a coach at Third Division club Lincoln City before being appointed as manager of their divisional rivals Barnet in June 1997. In preparation for 1997–98, Still primarily signed players he had worked with at Peterborough, including Ken Charlery, Greg Heald, Billy Manuel, and Scott McGleish. In his first season in charge, Still took Barnet to the Third Division play-offs, but lost 3–2 in the semi-final to Colchester United. The club finished in 16th place in 1998–99 and only seven points from relegation – their lowest position since being promoted to the Football League. Still led Barnet to the play-offs once again in 1999–2000, under the threat of the club being expelled from the division due to problems surrounding their home ground, Underhill. The club spent most of the season in the league's promotion places, but fell away in the final months and ultimately lost 5–1 on aggregate in the play-off semi-final to Still's former club Peterborough United.

In November 2000, Still became Barnet's director of football following the high-profile appointment of former England international Tony Cottee as player-manager. At the time, Barnet were sitting in tenth place in the league, but soon suffered a sharp loss of form and plunged down the table to the relegation zone. On 16 March 2001, Cottee left after losing 13 of his 19 league matches as manager and Still returned to lead the team for the remainder of the season. He was unable to prevent Barnet's slide back into the Football Conference, as a 3–2 defeat at home to Torquay United on the final day of the season saw them relegated and end a decade-long stay in the Football League. Still agreed to remain as both the club's manager and director of football until a replacement could be found, with Barnet intending to promote youth team coach and former Norwich City defender Ian Culverhouse to manager. However, Culverhouse left the club in January 2001 to become youth team coach at Leyton Orient and Still subsequently resigned as manager one month later. At the time, Barnet were 14th in the table, winless in seven league matches and had been knocked out of the FA Trophy.

Still remained as Barnet's director of football until the end of 2001–02, before leaving to become the assistant manager of Third Division club Bristol Rovers in May 2002, joining up with Ray Graydon. He left the club in December 2003 after Rovers entered financial difficulty and were forced to cancel his contract.

=== Dagenham & Redbridge ===
On 16 April 2004, Still returned to non-League football as manager of Dagenham & Redbridge for a second time. He took charge of the final two matches of 2003–04 as Dagenham finished in 13th position. With less money at his disposal than his predecessor Garry Hill, Still began overhauling the squad, signing players from further down the league pyramid such as Craig Mackail-Smith, Shane Blackett, Scott Griffiths and Glen Southam, while allowing 15 players to leave. The club finished in 11th place in 2004–05. Still continued building his squad, signing Carshalton Athletic winger Sam Saunders and White Ensign striker Paul Benson, who was playing in the Essex Olympian League – the eleventh tier of English football. In October 2005, Still was offered the manager's job at Bristol Rovers, but rejected it stating that he was "very settled" at Dagenham. The club struggled for consistency through 2005–06, finishing the season in tenth, albeit with fewer points than in 2004–05. The Dagenham board, who had faith in Still's long-term plans for the club, offered him a new two-year contract, which he signed in July 2006.

In his third season in charge Still's team began well, losing only three of their first 20 matches to sit in second place in the table by November. The team continued its winning form and, on 7 April 2007, won the Conference National title and promotion to League Two for the first time in the club's history with five matches of the season left to play. Still won the Manager of the Month award for his team's performances in November 2006 and March 2007.

In 2007–08, Still prevented Dagenham from being immediately relegated back into non-League by guiding them to a 20th-place finish, seven points from the relegation zone. In the following season, Still was named Manager of the Month for December 2008, as Dagenham missed out on a play-off place by one point. Still's team ended that campaign as the league's top scorers with 77 goals in 46 matches, and had the second best goal difference behind only league winners Brentford.

In 2009–10, Still was named League Two Manager of the Month for August 2009, in which Dagenham won four of their opening five matches and took an early lead at the top of the League Two table. Still led the club to their then-highest ever finish in their history – seventh in League Two – which allowed them to qualify for the play-offs. His team beat Morecambe 7–2 on aggregate in the play-off semi-final, which included a 6–0 win in the first leg. He led the team out on 30 May 2010 at Wembley Stadium to face Rotherham United for a place in League One. The Daggers won 3–2, with goals from Paul Benson, Danny Green and Jon Nurse, and were promoted to the third tier of English football for the first time. Still won the BBC London Sports Personality of the Year award for this achievement, beating Premier League winning manager Carlo Ancelotti and European Athletics Championship goal medallist Mo Farah, amongst others. Still underwent an operation during the middle of the season to cure an ongoing problem with kidney stones and gallstones; this kept him from attending a number of matches, leaving assistant manager Terry Harris in charge.

Still's team struggled to compete on their limited budget in League One and were relegated on the last day of 2010–11 following a 5–0 defeat to Peterborough United. On 13 May 2011, Still turned down the managerial job at League Two club Bradford City.

He presided over the reconstruction of Dagenham & Redbridge's squad in 2011–12 as his team finished in 19th position. At the beginning of the following season, Still was assured by the Dagenham board that no players would be sold; information which he then relayed to his players. In January 2013, striker Dwight Gayle was sold to Championship team Peterborough United for a club-record fee of £470,000, which left Still feeling "a bit undermined". In February 2013, with the Daggers sitting in 16th place in the League Two table, the club was approached by Conference Premier club Luton Town for permission to speak to Still about their vacant managerial job. Still agreed to join Luton, with Dagenham waiving the full compensation fee "in light of the fantastic job he has done for the [club]". Before leaving Dagenham, Still was the then-longest serving Football League manager, having spent nine years at the club.

=== Luton Town ===
On 26 February 2013, Still joined Conference Premier club Luton Town, replacing Paul Buckle. He signed a two-and-a-half-year contract with the club, stating that he wanted to bring stability after it had employed four different managers in four seasons. While Luton could have mathematically qualified for the play-offs in the final two months of the 2012–13 season, Still elected instead to assess the squad in order to prepare for the next season. Two of the team's worst performances of the season came at this time – a 2–1 home defeat to Hyde on 12 March 2013 and 5–1 loss to Gateshead a month later – but the team rebounded with a five-game unbeaten run to end the season in seventh place. Still began making his mark on the club during the close season by releasing twelve players, signing eleven new ones, overhauling the club's backroom staff, and instilling his philosophy on the club.

The changes began to have the desired effect; on 21 December 2013, following a run of form in the league that put Luton in a strong position to challenge for the title, it was announced that Still had signed a new contract through to 2015 with the condition that, for each promotion the club won, an additional year would be added to the contract. Still was later announced as the Conference Premier Manager of the Month for December 2013 following six wins from six matches that pushed Luton to the top of the table. Luton continued their unbeaten league run under his management, which saw him win the Manager of the Month award for February 2014 after four wins from four matches placed the club 14 points clear. On 15 April 2014, Luton confirmed their return to the Football League and claimed the Conference Premier title after second-placed team Cambridge United lost 2–0 to Kidderminster Harriers. This achievement made Still the only manager to have taken three different clubs to promotion out of non-League football. Still hailed the campaign as "the most remarkable season ever" that he had been involved in, with his side setting a number of club records including the longest league unbeaten run (27 matches), most consecutive away matches unbeaten (15), most clean sheets (23), and most points accumulated (101). Luton's strong run-in at the end of the season, which saw them win six of their seven matches, led to Still winning the Manager of the Month award for April 2014; the third time in a single season that he had been awarded the accolade.

Still's Luton team began 2014–15 strongly, topping the League Two table after the first 15 matches, resulting in him receiving the Manager of the Month Award for October. The club remained in contention for automatic promotion for much of the season until a run of seven consecutive losses throughout March and April left them struggling to stay in the play-off positions. Luton ultimately finished the season in eighth position, three points and one place from the play-offs. In January 2015, Still was awarded honorary freedom of the borough of Luton.

In 2015–16, Still's Luton team struggled for consistency. A run of two wins in ten league matches from October through to December led to Still being sacked by the Luton board on 17 December 2015, with the club sitting in 17th place in the League Two table. BBC Three Counties stated that: "Still's reign ended in boos [following a 4–3 home defeat to Northampton Town], but he'll be forever remembered as the Hatters boss who returned Luton to the Football League."

=== Return to Dagenham & Redbridge ===
On 31 December 2015 it was announced that Still would return as manager of struggling Dagenham & Redbridge, replacing Wayne Burnett who had been sacked earlier in December.

=== Third spell at Barnet ===
On 17 May 2018, Still resigned from his role at Dagenham. A day later, he was confirmed as manager of Barnet, joining the National League club for the third time.

Still announced his retirement from football management on 28 December 2018 and took on the role of head of football at the club. Still left the Bees by mutual consent on 23 January 2019.

=== Maidstone United ===
Still came out of retirement less than a month later when he joined Maidstone United as head of football on 23 January 2019. Still announced his retirement for a second time on 9 March 2020, leaving the club at the end of the 2019–20 season and expiration of his 18-month deal.

=== Southend United ===
On 23 November 2021, Still was appointed head of football at Southend United.

=== Chelmsford City ===
On 20 April 2026, Still was appointed as Head of Football at National League South club Chelmsford City.

== Managerial style ==
Still has been described as a "direct and conventional tactician", often using a target man and fast wingers and/or strikers in either a 4–4–2 or 4–3–3 formation. During the nine seasons he spent in his second stint as manager of Dagenham & Redbridge, his team primarily employed direct, attacking long ball football. At Dagenham, Still was known to sometimes operate "attractive to watch" football and, in Luton Town's title-winning season in 2013–14, his team was described as playing "fast, attacking football" with a "pass and move" mentality, demonstrated by 5–0, 6–0 and 7–0 wins over Alfreton Town, Kidderminster Harriers and Hereford United respectively.

Still's teams have been labelled as "fit and organised" and, even at clubs with small budgets, he has stated that he always employs a fitness and conditioning coach. Still has also said that he places attitude above ability, rejecting talented players who did not show ambition or willingness to self-improve.

He has won praise for his man-management and talent spotting skills, especially his ability to discover young players in non-League football at the sixth tier and below, develop them and then sell them – often for a significant profit. Players that Still has developed that have gone on to play at a higher level include Marlon King, Craig Mackail-Smith, Paul Benson, Sam Saunders, Danny Green, and Dwight Gayle. Dagenham & Redbridge managing director Steve Thompson has stated that Still's ability to do this kept the club consistently able to compete while operating on a far smaller budget than its rivals. Still's reputation for nurturing talent, combined with his vast array of contacts within the game gained through decades of coaching, have also led to highly rated young players from Premier League academies joining his teams on loan. Examples include Marlon Pack and Matt Ritchie at Dagenham, and Cameron McGeehan, Pelly Ruddock Mpanzu and Elliot Lee at Luton.

Elite Soccer Coaching magazine has stated that Still's "likeable character" and ability to find and develop players from the non-League game have made him one of the most respected coaches in English football.

== Managerial statistics ==
As of match played 26 January 2019

Managerial record by team and tenure
Team	From	To	Record					Ref.
Team	From	To	P	W	D	L	Win %	Ref.
Leytonstone	1 June 1976	1 June 1979	140	35	37	68	25.0	
Leytonstone & Illford	1 June 1979	1 June 1983	201	117	42	42	58.2	
Dartford	1 June 1983	1 June 1986	139	56	34	49	40.3	
Leytonstone & Illford	1 June 1986	3 December 1986	23	15	3	5	65.2	
Maidstone United	4 December 1986	1 June 1989	125	64	28	33	51.2	
Redbridge Forest	1 June 1989	1 June 1992	147	73	31	43	49.7	
Dagenham & Redbridge	1 June 1992	1 June 1994	99	43	28	28	43.4	
Peterborough United	1 August 1994	24 October 1995	67	19	24	24	28.4	
Barnet	30 June 1997	1 November 2000	175	66	43	66	37.7	
Barnet	16 March 2001	22 February 2002	51	17	15	19	33.3	
Dagenham & Redbridge	1 April 2004	26 February 2013	454	170	100	184	37.4	
Luton Town	26 February 2013	17 December 2015	148	69	38	41	46.6	
Dagenham & Redbridge	31 December 2015	17 May 2018	124	51	23	50	41.1	
Barnet	18 May 2018	28 December 2018	29	14	5	10	48.3	
Maidstone United	24 January 2019	30 June 2020	61	20	15	26	32.8	
Total			1,983	829	466	688	41.8	—

== Honours ==
Leytonstone/Ilford

- Isthmian League Premier Division: 1981–82
- Isthmian League Cup: 1981–82

Dartford

- Southern League Premier Division: 1983–84

Maidstone United

- Football Conference: 1988–89

Redbridge Forest

- Isthmian League Premier Division: 1990–91

Dagenham & Redbridge

- Football League Two play-offs: 2010
- Conference National: 2006–07

Luton Town

- Conference Premier: 2013–14

Individual

- Conference Premier Manager of the Month: November 2006, March 2007, December 2013, February 2014, April 2014
- Football League Two Manager of the Month: December 2008, August 2009, October 2014
- BBC London Sports Personality of the Year: 2010

Special awards

- Freedom of the London Borough of Barking and Dagenham: 2011
- Freedom of the Borough of Luton: 2015

== See also ==
- List of football managers with the most matches
