= Mick Bodley =

English footballer

Personal information
- Full name: Michael John Bodley
- Date of birth: 14 September 1967 (age 59)
- Place of birth: Hayes, England
- Height: 6 ft 1 in (1.85 m)
- Position: Central defender

Youth career
- 1983–1985: Chelsea

Senior career*
| Years | Team | Apps | (Gls) |
| 1985–1989 | Chelsea | 6 | (1) |
| 1989 | Northampton Town | 20 | (0) |
| 1989–1993 | Barnet | 108 | (9) |
| 1993–1996 | Southend United | 67 | (2) |
| 1994–1995 | → Gillingham (loan) | 7 | (0) |
| 1995 | → Birmingham City (loan) | 3 | (0) |
| 1996–1999 | Peterborough United | 86 | (1) |
| 1999 | St Albans City | 6 | (0) |
| 1999–2000 | Dagenham & Redbridge | | |
| 2000–2002 | Canvey Island | | |
- * Club domestic league appearances and goals

Michael John Bodley (born 14 September 1967) is an English former professional footballer who made 258 appearances in the Football League playing for Chelsea, Northampton Town, Barnet, Southend United, Gillingham, Birmingham City and Peterborough United. He played as a central defender.

== Career ==
=== Early career ===
Bodley was born in Hayes, in the London Borough of Hillingdon. He began his football career as an apprentice with Chelsea, and turned professional in 1985. He played eight times for the first team in all competitions before leaving for Northampton Town for a fee of £50,000 in January 1989. He played 20 league games for the club before moving into non-league football with Barnet, who paid £15,000 for his services in October 1989.

=== Barnet, Southend United and loans ===
Bodley contributed to Barnet's Conference title in 1991, and to their run to the third round proper of that year's FA Cup, scoring twice in their 3–1 defeat of Heybridge Swifts in the fourth qualifying round. In the 1992–93 season, Bodley was one of 11 Barnet players awarded free transfers by the Football League because the club had not paid their wages. He joined Southend United in July 1993, linking up with former Barnet manager Barry Fry who had joined the club not long before. In three seasons with Southend he played 79 games in all competitions, and spent two months on loan at Gillingham, whose supporters made a £2,500 donation to the club in an attempt to fund the player's stay for a third month: a fruitless gesture, as the player joined Birmingham City five days later, also on loan, as cover for injuries and suspensions among the defence.

=== Peterborough United, St Albans City and Dagenham & Redbridge ===
In July 1996, Peterborough United manager Barry Fry, who had worked with Bodley at Barnet, Southend and Birmingham, paid his former club £75,000 for his services. Bodley took part in the club's record league win, against his former club Barnet in Division Three in September 1998: Peterborough won 9–1, and Bodley's own goal meant they actually scored all ten. Bodley played more than 100 games in all competitions, and was appointed club captain, before he and teammate Derek Payne were allowed to leave Peterborough on a free transfer for Isthmian League Premier Division club St Albans City, strengthening their squad prior to the FA Trophy semi-final. Bodley played six league games for the club and took part in both legs of the Trophy semi-final, which St Albans lost 4–3 on aggregate. In the 1999 close season he became manager Garry Hill's first signing for Dagenham & Redbridge, soon to be followed by Payne. Awarded the captaincy, Bodley led his players to the Isthmian League title, and with it promotion to the Conference National; they lost only five games all season, and finished the campaign with ten successive victories.

=== Canvey Island ===
At the end of the season he signed for Canvey Island, and contributed to their reaching the second round of the FA Cup in his first season. Doubtful for the first-round match at home to Port Vale because of a groin injury, Bodley declared himself fit, played 90 minutes in the tie which ended 4–4 draw, and played 120 minutes in the replay as Canvey won 2–1 after extra time to set themselves up a local derby with Southend United. Bodley, one of eight former Southend players on Canvey's books, would miss it through suspension, though the club enquired whether the game might be moved to the Friday to allow him to take part; as the venue was already booked that night for a carol concert, the match was played as scheduled, and Canvey lost 2–1. That same season, Bodley played as Canvey won the FA Trophy, defeating Forest Green Rovers 1–0 at Villa Park to become the first side from below the Conference to win the Trophy for 20 years. Postponements because of cup success and bad weather caused fixture congestion at the end of the 2001–02 season, leaving Bodley facing a schedule of seven games in nine days combined with having to get up at 4:30am for work as a postman. Bodley underwent a knee operation in November 2001 which kept him out for several weeks, then in March 2002 he damaged a tendon which put an end to his season and effectively meant his retirement.

== Personal life ==
When Bodley left professional football he worked as a postman. He is married with daughters.
