= Scott Houghton =

English footballer

Personal information
- Full name: Scott Aaron Houghton
- Date of birth: 22 October 1971 (age 55)
- Place of birth: Hitchin, England
- Position: Midfielder

Youth career
- Tottenham Hotspur

Senior career*
Years	Team	Apps	(Gls)
1990–1993	Tottenham Hotspur	10	(2)
1991	→ Ipswich Town (loan)	8	(1)
1992	→ Charlton Athletic (loan)	6	(0)
1992	→ Cambridge United (loan)	0	(0)
1992–1993	→ Gillingham (loan)	3	(0)
1993–1994	Luton Town	16	(1)
1994–1996	Walsall	78	(14)
1996–1999	Peterborough United	58	(11)
1998	→ Southend United (loan)	4	(1)
1999	→ Southend United (loan)	17	(2)
1999–2000	Southend United	52	(6)
2000–2002	Leyton Orient	42	(6)
2002	Halifax Town	7	(0)
2002	Stevenage Borough	12	(1)
Total		313	(45)

International career
- England Under-20
- * Club domestic league appearances and goals

Scott Houghton (born 22 October 1971 in Hitchin) is an English former footballer and current Police Officer. Houghton was a midfielder who began his career with Tottenham Hotspur before going on to play for a succession of lower league clubs including Peterborough United.

After retiring from the game, Houghton decided to join the police force. In his first posting as a police officer, he was appointed the on-site police officer for The Voyager School.

Houghton has also had television exposure, as he also appears in the Sky TV Police series Cop Squad that follows the going's on at Cambridgeshire Constabulary.

== Honours ==
Walsall

- Football League Third Division runner-up: 1994–95

Individual

- PFA Team of the Year: 1997–98 Third Division
