= James Hunt (footballer) =

English footballer

Personal information
- Full name: James Malcolm Hunt
- Date of birth: 17 December 1976 (age 49)
- Place of birth: Codnor, England
- Height: 5 ft 8 in (1.73 m)
- Position: Midfielder

Youth career
- –1994: Notts County

Senior career*
| Years | Team | Apps | (Gls) |
| 1994–1997 | Notts County | 19 | (1) |
| 1997–2002 | Northampton Town | 174 | (8) |
| 2002–2004 | Oxford United | 80 | (3) |
| 2004–2007 | Bristol Rovers | 95 | (6) |
| 2007 | → Grimsby Town (loan) | 15 | (2) |
| 2007–2009 | Grimsby Town | 59 | (0) |
| 2009–2010 | Gainsborough Trinity | 32 | (1) |
| Total | | 474 | (21) |
- * Club domestic league appearances and goals

James Malcolm Hunt (born 12 December 1976) is an English former professional footballer who played as a midfielder from 1994 until 2010.

Hunt played for Notts County, Northampton Town, Oxford United, Bristol Rovers, Grimsby Town and Gainsborough Trinity.

== Career ==
=== Notts County ===
Hunt was born shortly after his namesake became Formula One World Champion in Codnor. Hunt started his professional career after graduating from the youth academy at Notts County. He was promoted to the first-team squad at the start of the 1994–1995 season and was handed his debut by Russell Slade. During his time at Meadow Lane Hunt also played under Howard Kendall, Steve Nicol and Colin Murphy before finally being released by Sam Allardyce at the end of the 1996–1997 season. Hunt played 73 times for the Magpies in all competitions, scoring one goal in the League Cup.

=== Northampton Town ===
Ian Atkins brought Hunt to Northampton Town in the summer of 1997. Hunt did not make his debut for the Cobblers until 21 October 1997 when he came on as a 55th-minute substitute for David Rennie. During his first full season with Northampton the club secured a play-off place with the Second Division and after defeating Bristol Rovers in the semi-final the club were defeated 1–0 by Grimsby Town at Wembley Stadium.

=== Oxford United ===
In 2002 Hunt joined Oxford United.

=== Bristol Rovers ===
In 2004, he signed for Bristol Rovers, and he became the club's captain until November 2006, when a disagreement with first-team coach Paul Trollope about Hunt being named as a substitute instead of being in the starting 11 led to him being transfer listed.

=== Grimsby Town ===
He joined Grimsby Town in early 2007 on loan and was instrumental in the club's successful fight to avoid relegation. He was out of contract with the Pirates in the summer so signed permanently for the Mariners. Hunt cemented himself as one of the first-team regulars in the side managed by Alan Buckley during the 2007–2008 season. Buckley was sacked as manager in the early part of the following season, and when he was replaced by Mike Newell, Newell opted to bring in such players as Jean-Paul Kalala. Hunt found himself froze out of the first-team, until the late season when he managed to re-established his place in Grimsby's first-team following injuries to Kalala and Dean Sinclair. Hunt managed to hold a regular position down and became an integral part of the team that for the third season in a row managed to avoid relegation. Despite earning back a place in the team, Hunt was released by Newell, stating that at the age of 33, Grimsby could not offer Hunt first-team football.

=== Gainsborough Trinity ===
Hunt signed for non-League club Gainsborough Trinity on 29 May 2009 where he remained for a new season before retiring from football for family reasons.

== Honours ==
Grimsby Town

- Football League Trophy runner-up: 2007–08
