= Chris Cleaver =

English footballer (born 1979)

Personal information
- Full name: Christopher William Cleaver
- Date of birth: 24 March 1979 (age 47)
- Place of birth: Hitchin, England
- Position: Midfielder

Youth career
- 1990–1991: Luton Town
- 1991–1993: Norwich City
- 1993–1996: Peterborough United

Senior career*
Years	Team	Apps	(Gls)
1996–2000	Peterborough United	29	(3)
1999	→ Grantham Town (loan)	10	(3)
2000	→ King's Lynn (loan)		
2000	→ Cambridge City (loan)		
2000–2001	TP-Seinäjoki	53	(17)
2002–2003	FF Jaro	56	(16)
2004–2005	AC Allianssi	43	(4)
2006	GIF Sundsvall		
2007–2010	Turun Palloseura	66	(3)
2011–2013	SJK	71	(11)
- * Club domestic league appearances and goals as of 4 February 2016

Christopher William Cleaver (born 24 March 1979 in Hitchin) is an English former football midfielder who last played for Finnish Veikkausliiga side SJK.

He was a schoolboy at Norwich City, but started his senior career at Peterborough United. Following loan-spells at Grantham Town, King's Lynn and Cambridge City, he moved to Finland to play for TP-Seinäjoki. He then played for FF Jaro, AC Allianssi and Swedish side GIF Sundsvall, before returning to Finland to play for TPS and SJK until 2013. After his football career Cleaver has worked as a football agent.
