= Neil Le Bihan =

English footballer (1976–2023)

Personal information
- Full name: Neil Ernest Le Bihan
- Date of birth: 14 March 1976
- Place of birth: Croydon, England
- Date of death: 12 October 2023 (aged 47)
- Place of death: South London, England
- Position: Midfielder

Youth career
- Tottenham Hotspur

Senior career*
Years	Team	Apps	(Gls)
1994–1997	Peterborough United	31	(0)
1997–2002	Dover Athletic		
2002–2003	Crawley Town		
- * Club domestic league appearances and goals

Neil Le Bihan (14 March 1976 – 12 October 2023) was an English footballer who played as a midfielder.

== Career ==
Le Bihan was an apprentice at Tottenham Hotspur before signing for Peterborough United in 1994. He made 44 appearances in all competitions for the club in three seasons, scoring three goals. In league competition he appeared in 31 games without scoring.

In 1997, Le Bihan signed for Dover Athletic, where he spent five seasons, before finishing his career at Crawley Town. After retiring from football in 2003, he went on to become a successful barista.

== Death ==
Le Bihan died in his South London home from a suspected suicide on 12 October 2023. He was 47.
