= Lee Charles =

English footballer

Personal information
- Full name: Lee Mercury Charles
- Date of birth: 20 August 1971 (age 55)
- Place of birth: Hillingdon, England
- Height: 5 ft 11 in (1.80 m)
- Position: Forward

Senior career*
Years	Team	Apps	(Gls)
–1995	Chertsey Town		
1995–1998	Queens Park Rangers	16	(1)
1995	→ Barnet (loan)	5	(0)
1998	→ Cambridge United (loan)	7	(1)
1998–2000	Hayes	42	(26)
2000–2002	Nuneaton Borough	70	(15)
2002–2004	Aldershot Town	33	(7)
- * Club domestic league appearances and goals

Lee Mercury Charles (born 20 August 1971) is an English former football forward.
