= Miguel de Souza =

English footballer

Personal information
- Date of birth: 11 February 1970 (age 56)
- Place of birth: Newham, England
- Height: 6 ft 1 in (1.85 m)
- Positions: Right back; right midfielder; forward
- Brighton & Hove Albion

Senior career*
| Years | Team | Apps | (Gls) |
| 1988–1989 | Clapton | | |
| 1989–1990 | Charlton Athletic | 0 | (0) |
| 1990 | Bristol City | 0 | (0) |
| 1990–1991 | Yeovil Town | 22 | (0) |
| 1993–1994 | Dagenham & Redbridge | 21 | (15) |
| 1994–1995 | Birmingham City | 15 | (0) |
| 1994–1995 | → Bury (loan) | 3 | (0) |
| 1995–1997 | Wycombe Wanderers | 83 | (29) |
| 1997–1998 | Peterborough United | 35 | (5) |
| 1998 | → Southend United (loan) | 2 | (0) |
| 1998 | → Rochdale (loan) | 5 | (0) |
| 1998–2000 | Rushden & Diamonds | 54 | (14) |
| 2000–2001 | Boston United | 9 | (1) |
| 2002–2004 | St Albans City | 86 | (19) |
- * Club domestic league appearances and goals

Miguel Juan I. de Souza (born 11 February 1970) is an English footballer.

== Career ==
He began his career as a youth player with West Ham United as a 14 year old, where he remained for a year before signing schoolboy forms with Brighton & Hove Albion. He was not offered a scholarship and consequently left football for a couple of years before joining Clapton. He progressed through the ranks at The Old Spotted Dog Ground before moving to Charlton Athletic in the first division signing professional forms for one year. He played as a right back and right midfielder. Failing to secure a first team place he joined Bristol City, where he remained on a monthly contract for several months before signing for Conference side Yeovil Town. After 18 months he returned to London and joined Dagenham & Redbridge, where reserve-team manager Ted Hardy converted him to a striker. A year season later de Souza broke into the first team scoring 15 goals before being signed by Barry Fry for then First Division (second-tier) club Birmingham City. He played as a right-sided midfielder, occasionally playing as a striker in the first team.

He had successful spells at both Wycombe Wanderers and Peterborough United. De Souza appeared in the 1997 documentary, There's Only One Barry Fry. The documentary shows how Fry signed De Souza to Peterborough from Wycombe, and shouted "Sold to the fat bastard in the blue blazer!" when Fry and De Souza reached an agreement.

He also played for two other Conference outfits Rushden & Diamonds and Boston United.

He was appointed player/coach of St Albans City in May 2004.

He joined Leyton Orient's youth setup in 2009, coaching the under-16s for four years and then taking on the role of academy head of recruitment. He now works at Charlton Athletic as academy recruitment manager.
