= Gary Martindale =

English footballer (born 1971)

Personal information
- Date of birth: 24 June 1971 (age 55)
- Place of birth: Liverpool, England
- Position: Striker

Senior career*
Years	Team	Apps	(Gls)
1993–1994	Burscough		
1994–1995	Bolton Wanderers	0	(0)
1995–1996	Peterborough United	31	(15)
1996–1998	Notts County	65	(13)
1997	→ Mansfield Town (loan)	5	(2)
1998–2000	Rotherham United	28	(6)
2000	→ Telford United (loan)	6	(4)
2000–2002	Telford United	52	(12)
2002–2003	Burscough		
2005	Chorley	23	(5)
2005–2006	Vauxhall Motors	13	(3)
2010–2011	Formby	9	(3)
2011–2014	Vauxhall Motors	4	(0)
Total		236	(63)

Managerial career
- 2010–2011: Formby
- 2011–2014: Vauxhall Motors (Assistant Manager)
- 2014–2015: Marine (Assistant Manager)
- 2015–: Witton Albion (Assistant Manager)
- * Club domestic league appearances and goals

Gary Martindale (born 24 June 1971) is an English former professional footballer who played as a striker. He has since moved into management, serving as manager and assistant manager at four non-league football clubs in the North West of England.

== Playing career ==
Born in Liverpool, Martindale began his senior career in non-League football with Burscough. He later played in the Football League for Bolton Wanderers, Peterborough United, Notts County, Mansfield Town and Rotherham United, before returning to non-League football with Telford United and Burscough.

Despite having played in the Second Division (now League One) with Notts County, his most outstanding moment came after he returned to Burscough. In May 2003 they reached the final of the FA Trophy against Tamworth. Having started the competition as 400–1 outsiders, they had narrowed the odds but were still far from favourites. They pulled off a shock 2–1 win, with Martindale scoring both their goals.

== Coaching career ==
=== Formby ===
Martindale was appointed manager of Formby in July 2010. Without time to rebuild the severely depleted squad before the season began, Formby had a disastrous first few games. Lacking a striker, Martindale reluctantly picked himself for the team. He scored in four out of his first five matches.

Despite turning Formby's fortunes around, including signing notable players like John Paul Kissock, Adam Farley and John Lawless, he felt unsupported by the club and after internal restructuring of the club he resigned in January 2011. He expressed an immediate desire to continue his management career elsewhere.

=== Vauxhall Motors ===
Two months later he took up a backroom coaching role at Prescot Cables, before being hired in June 2011 as Assistant Manager of Vauxhall Motors F.C. by their new manager Anthony Wright.

During the 2011–12 season, he was once more registered as a player for Vauxhall Motors.

=== Marine ===
In 2014 he was appointed by Marine as Assistant Manager, again alongside Carl Macauley who was appointed as manager. They left the club in February 2015.

=== Witton Albion ===
In October 2015 he was appointed, again as assistant manager, alongside Carl Macauley as manager at Witton Albion.

== Honours ==
Notts County

- Football League Third Division: 1997–98
