= Gary Jones (footballer, born 1969) =

English footballer

Personal information
- Date of birth: 6 April 1969 (age 57)
- Place of birth: Huddersfield, England
- Position: Centre forward

Senior career*
Years	Team	Apps	(Gls)
- Rossington Main
1988–1990	Doncaster Rovers	20	(2)
- Grantham Town
- Kettering Town
1991–1993	Boston United	75	(2)
1993–1996	Southend United	70	(16)
1993–1994	→ Lincoln City (loan)	4	(2)
1995–1999	Notts County	117	(38)
1996–1997	→ Scunthorpe United (loan)	11	(5)
1998–2000	Hartlepool United	45	(7)
1999–2000	→ Halifax Town (loan)	8	(1)
2000–2002	Halifax Town	68	(9)
2002–2003	Nuneaton Borough		
2002–2003	Hucknall Town		
2002–2003	Gainsborough Trinity		
2003–2007	Armthorpe Welfare		
2006–2008	Selby Town		
2007–2009	Armthorpe Welfare		
2009–2010	Winterton Rangers		
2016–2017	cask		
- * Club domestic league appearances and goals

Gary Jones (born 6 April 1969) is an English former footballer who played over three hundred times in the Football League principally for Southend United, Notts County and Halifax Town.

== Career ==
=== Return to non-league ===
Jones joined Nuneaton Borough ahead of the 2002–03 season before moving on to Hucknall Town and Gainsborough Trinity. In the summer of 2003 he linked up with Armthorpe Welfare. In November 2006 he joined Selby Town before returning to Armthorpe Welfare the following season. In July 2009 he joined Winterton Rangers, scoring twice on his Northern Counties East League debut for the club in the 4–0 victory at Rainworth Miners Welfare on 8 August 2009.

Jones retired from playing in November 2009.

== Honours ==
Notts County

- Football League Third Division: 1997–98
