= Sean Farrell (footballer) =

English footballer

Personal information
- Full name: Sean Paul Farrell
- Date of birth: 28 February 1969 (age 57)
- Place of birth: Watford, England
- Height: 6 ft 1 in (1.85 m)
- Position: Forward

Youth career
- 1985–1987: Luton Town

Senior career*
Years	Team	Apps	(Gls)
1987–1991	Luton Town	25	(1)
1988	→ Colchester United (loan)	9	(1)
1991	→ Northampton Town (loan)	4	(1)
1991–1994	Fulham	94	(31)
1994–1997	Peterborough United	66	(20)
1997–2001	Notts County	89	(22)
2001–2003	Burton Albion	12	(1)
Total		299	(77)
- * Club domestic league appearances and goals

Sean Paul Farrell (born 28 February 1969 in Watford) is an English former professional footballer.

== Early life and youth career ==
Farrell was born and raised in Watford, Hertfordshire, and grew up supporting his local team, Watford. He was invited to try out for Luton Town – Watford's traditional rivals – in 1985, when he was 15 years old. After impressing during his initial trial, he was invited back to play for the club's youth team in a match against Reading, during which he scored two goals in a 4–2 Luton victory. The team offered him an apprenticeship soon after, and he signed before his 16th birthday; he turned professional two years later.

== Senior career ==
Farrell caused a stir among sections of the Luton support with his open support of the club's rivals. He went out on loan to Colchester United in 1988, and broke into the Luton side during the 1990–91 season, when he made twenty appearances. However, the return of David Pleat to Luton heralded a loan move to Northampton Town in 1991 before a permanent £100,000 move to Fulham. At Fulham he scored 31 goals in 94 games before moving to Peterborough United in 1994. In 1997, he joined Notts County, and played there for four years before joining Burton Albion, where he ended his career due to injury in 2003.

== After football ==
Farrell now lives in Hertfordshire and works in the area.

== Honours ==
Notts County

- Football League Third Division: 1997–98
