= Derek Payne =

English footballer

Personal information
- Full name: Derek Richard Payne
- Date of birth: 26 April 1967 (age 59)
- Place of birth: Edgware, England
- Position: Midfielder

Senior career*
Years	Team	Apps	(Gls)
- Kingsbury Town
- Burnham
1988	Hayes		
1988–1993	Barnet	51	(6)
- Cheltenham Town
- Fisher Athletic
1993–1994	Southend United	35	(0)
1994–1996	Watford	36	(1)
1996–1999	Peterborough United	82	(4)
- Dagenham & Redbridge
- Harrow Borough
- St Albans City
- Egham Town
- Flackwell Heath
Total		204	(11)
- * Club domestic league appearances and goals

Derek Richard Payne (born 26 April 1967) is an English former professional footballer who played as a midfielder, making over 200 appearances in the Football League.

== Career ==
Born in Edgware, Payne played for Kingsbury Town, Burnham, Hayes, Barnet, Cheltenham Town, Fisher Athletic, Southend United, Watford, Peterborough United, Dagenham & Redbridge, Harrow Borough, St Albans City, Egham Town and Flackwell Heath.

Since the mid-2000s, he has worked as a match-day summariser on BBC Three Counties Radio commentaries of Watford games.

== Honours ==
Individual

- PFA Team of the Year: 1992–93 Third Division
