= Dave Morrison (footballer) =

English footballer

Personal information
- Full name: David Morrison
- Date of birth: 30 November 1974 (age 51)
- Place of birth: Waltham Forest, England
- Height: 5 ft 11 in (1.80 m)
- Position: Midfielder

Senior career*
Years	Team	Apps	(Gls)
–1992	Aveley		
1992–1994	Chelmsford City	35	(10)
1994–1997	Peterborough United	77	(12)
1996	→ Rushden & Diamonds (loan)	5	(0)
1997–2000	Leyton Orient	46	(3)
2000	→ Dover Athletic (loan)	11	(3)
2000–2004	Bohemians	151	(25)
2004–2005	Kidderminster Harriers	0	(0)
2005	Tamworth	6	(0)
2005–2007	Moor Green	10	(0)
2007–2008	Solihull Moors	10	(0)
Total		351	(53)
- * Club domestic league appearances and goals

Dave Morrison (born 30 November 1974) is an English former professional footballer.

== Career ==
Morrison began his career at Aveley, before joining Chelmsford City in 1992. Morrison played for Chelmsford's reserves for a year, before making the step-up to the first team in 1993. Morrison was sold to Peterborough United in May 1994 for a fee of £50,000. During his time with The Posh, Morrison made 77 appearances and scored 12 goals. He was also sent out to Rushden & Diamonds on loan in October 1996.

March 1997 saw Morrison move to Leyton Orient for a fee of £25,000. Morrison played a total of 46 games and scored three goals during his time with The O's. He was also loaned out to Dover Athletic in January 2000.

Morrison then moved to Bohemians in the summer of 2000 where he played in European wins against Aberdeen and FC Kaiserslautern. He also played a big part as Bohemians won the League and Cup Double in May 2001. He left Bohemians in December 2004, joining Kidderminster Harriers, but was released in January 2005.

Morrison then returned to the English game with Tamworth in March 2005, where he played with the Conference National side until the end of the 2005/06 season when he was released and joined Moor Green in July 2005.

In the 2007 close season Moor Green merged with local rivals Solihull Borough and like many of his Moor Green teammates Morrison joined the newly formed Solihull Moors.

Morrison was appointed Head Fitness coach at Swindon Tow n FC in 2009 until 28 June 2011 when he was appointed fitness coach at Sheffield United. In 2014 he joined Wolverhampton Wanderers as a Sports Scientist.
