= Greg Heald =

English footballer

Personal information
- Full name: Gregory Heald
- Date of birth: 26 September 1971 (age 55)
- Place of birth: Enfield, London, England
- Position: Central defender

Senior career*
Years	Team	Apps	(Gls)
1993–1994	Enfield		
1994–1997	Peterborough United	105	(6)
1997–2003	Barnet	202	(20)
2003–2004	Leyton Orient	9	(1)
2004–2005	Rochdale	39	(3)
2005	Burton Albion	0	(0)
2005	Ashton United	5	(0)
2005–2006	Aldershot Town	28	(2)
2006–2007	Thurrock	31	(0)
2008	Enfield Town		
Total		419	(32)
- * Club domestic league appearances and goals

Gregory Heald (born 26 September 1971) is an English retired professional footballer. He was born in the London Borough of Enfield, and played as a defender for various teams in the Football League. He started his career aged 11 at Leyton Orient and represented England Schoolboys before joining Norwich City as an apprentice in 1988 featuring in their youth side.

== Playing career ==
=== Enfield ===
Heald joined Enfield in 1993 and spent a season at Southbury Road helping the E's to narrowly miss out on promotion to the Football Conference from the Isthmian League.

=== Peterborough United ===
John Still, then manager of Peterborough United, snapped up his signature for £35,000. He featured in over 100 games, scoring 6 goals.

=== Barnet ===
In August 1997, with Still now in charge of Barnet, Heald put pen to paper to sign for the club; the transfer fee of £130,000 is still a club record. He made his Bees debut at his former club Norwich City in the League Cup on 12 August 1997. Barnet lost the game 2-1 but won the return at Underhill winning 3–1 on the night (4-3 on aggregate) coming from a goal down at half time.

Heald made 50 appearances and scored five goals helping the team to a seventh-place finish in Division Three. The club also reached the play-offs, losing to Colchester United.

Missing the first half of the following season due to an ankle and then a back injury making only 19 first team appearances (2 goals), Heald returned to the side in early 1999 at home to Shrewsbury Town. The Bees finished 16th in the league but found their feet again the following season with another play-off semi final against his old club Peterborough United, but lost on aggregate 5–1. Heald had featured in 46 games scoring five times.

The 2000–01 season saw Barnet relegated back to the Football Conference. Heald made 45 appearances that season again scoring five times. In 2001-2 Barnet finished 5th in their first season back in the Conference, Heald featuring 44 times scoring twice. In April 2002, he was selected for the England non-league international side to play the Netherlands.

In his final season at Underhill the club finished 11th in the Conference. On 27 March 2003, after making a further 18 appearances scoring 4 times Barnet sold Heald and teammate Wayne Purser to Leyton Orient for a joint fee of £18,000.

=== Leyton Orient, Rochdale, York City & Burton Albion ===
Heald was unable to secure a regular first team place at Orient, and in March 2004 he was released from his contract to join Rochdale. After a year at Spotland he briefly joined York City, then Burton Albion but soon moved on again to Ashton United in the Northern Premier League.

=== Aldershot Town ===
Moving back south Heald joined Aldershot Town for a season before he started to study for a degree in sports science and prepare for life after football as a teacher. To support this he had a spell as a fire officer while turning out part-time for Thurrock before a year later accepting the position of youth team coach at Wycombe Wanderers. Entering full-time teaching at The Latymer School in Enfield he briefly joined Enfield Town at the age of 37.
