= 1997–98 Football League =

99th season of the Football League

The Football League
- Season: 1997–98
- Champions: Nottingham Forest
- Promoted: Nottingham Forest; Middlesbrough; Charlton Athletic
- Relegated: Doncaster Rovers
- New Team in League: Macclesfield Town

The 1997–98 Football League (known as the Nationwide Football League for sponsorship reasons) was the 99th completed season of The Football League.

Champions Nottingham Forest and runners-up Middlesbrough won promotion back to the Premiership at the first time of asking. Charlton Athletic won the play-offs to end an eight-year absence from the top flight.

Reading were relegated in bottom place. They were joined on the last day of the season by Manchester City and Stoke City. The blue half of Manchester endured relegation to the third tier of the English league for the first time in its history, despite beating also doomed Stoke 5–2 away on the last day of the season, but neither fans took lightly to relegation, as mass football violence outside outshone the match. Bury, Portsmouth and Port Vale all won their games to avoid the drop.

Graham Taylor's second spell as manager brought instant success as Watford won the Division Two championship. They were joined by runners-up Bristol City and playoff winners Grimsby Town.

Going down to Division Three were Brentford, Plymouth Argyle, Carlisle United and Southend United. Brentford had been losing playoff finalists just 12 months earlier, Plymouth had been promoted to Division Two just two seasons earlier, Carlisle were newly promoted and Southend had endured their second successive relegation.

Macclesfield Town finished runners-up in Division Three to gain their second successive promotion, a year after winning the Conference. They were joined by champions Notts County, who won the title by 17 points and became the first team since World War II to secure promotion in March, third-placed Lincoln City and playoff winners Colchester United.

Doncaster Rovers suffered an English league record of 34 defeats and won just four games to lose their league status. They were replaced by Conference champions Halifax Town, who regained their league status five years after losing it.

== First Division ==
First Division
- Season: 1997–98
- Champions: Nottingham Forest
- Promoted: Nottingham Forest; Middlesbrough; Charlton Athletic
- Relegated: Manchester City; Stoke City; Reading
- Matches: 552
- Goals: 1,411 (2.56 per match)
- Top goalscorer: Kevin Phillips; Pierre van Hooijdonk (29 goals each)

One season after being relegated from the Premier League, Nottingham Forest achieved an instant comeback as Division One champions, meaning that manager Dave Bassett had now taken charge of promotion-winning teams eight times in 18 seasons. They were joined on the final day of the season by Middlesbrough, who had only been relegated the previous season due to a points deduction. Charlton Athletic clinched the final promotion place in dramatic fashion, beating Sunderland on penalties after a thrilling match which ended 4-4 after extra time and restored the South London club to the top flight for the first time since 1990. Ipswich Town and Sheffield United were the beaten semi-finalists, while Birmingham City missed out on the playoffs on goals scored. Stockport County, in the league's second tier for the first time in decades, finished an impressive eighth. FA Cup semi-finalists Wolves finished ninth, missing out on the playoffs.

Reading's final season at Elm Park ended in relegation in bottom place, meaning that they would begin life at their impressive new Madejski Stadium as a Division Two rather than Division One side. A dramatic final day of the season saw Stoke City host Manchester City at their new Britannia Stadium, with both teams knowing that victory was their only chance of survival. In the end, the visitors triumphed 5-2 but both sides were relegated due to Portsmouth, Port Vale and QPR all winning and securing survival.

The season saw numerous managerial changes in Division One. Despite being on a run to the semi-finals of the FA Cup and being in the hunt for promotion to the Premier League, Nigel Spackman stood down in March after less than a year in charge of Sheffield United, with his assistant Steve Thompson taking charge for the crucial final weeks of the season. Steve Bruce, the Birmingham City captain, was then appointed player-manager at Bramall Lane. At the other end of the table, Terry Bullivant was sacked by Reading in March having only been appointed the previous summer, with the former Celtic manager Tommy Burns being appointed as his successor. Stoke City began the season with Chic Bates as manager, but a mid-season downturn in form saw his dismissal in January and the appointment of Chris Kamara, who won just one of his 14 games in charge and was dismissed with five games left to play and Stoke deep in the relegation battle. Alan Durban took charge for the final five games, but was unable to save the Potters from relegation. Manchester City sacked manager Frank Clark in February after just over a year in charge, and replaced him with the former Everton manager Joe Royle. QPR's dismal form saw manager Bruce Rioch replaced by West Bromwich Albion's Ray Harford in early December, with Harford's successor at The Hawthorns being Denis Smith, recruited from debt-ridden Oxford United. The new manager at the Manor Ground was Malcolm Shotton, who managed to guide the Thames Valley side to a secure mid table finish in spite of the club's rising debts, which resulted in construction of the club's new stadium being halted. Portsmouth sacked Terry Fenwick in February after three years in charge and replaced him with Alan Ball, the manager of their most recent promotion-winning side in 1987. Huddersfield Town's dismal start to the campaign saw Brian Horton sacked in September and replaced by Peter Jackson, who guided the Terriers to a secure mid table finish. Mike Walker, whose first spell in charge of Norwich City had seen a Premier League title challenge and a memorable UEFA Cup run, stood down at Carrow Road with several games still to play as Norwich headed for another disappointing mid table finish. After the season was over, the Carrow Road board of directors appointed Bruce Rioch as their sixth manager in as many years.

=== Table ===
Pos	Team	Pld	W	D	L	GF	GA	GD	Pts	Qualification or relegation
1	Nottingham Forest (C, P)	46	28	10	8	82	42	+40	94	Promotion to the Premier League
2	Middlesbrough (P)	46	27	10	9	77	41	+36	91	Promotion to the Premier League
3	Sunderland	46	26	12	8	86	50	+36	90	Qualification for the First Division play-offs
4	Charlton Athletic (O, P)	46	26	10	10	80	49	+31	88	Qualification for the First Division play-offs
5	Ipswich Town	46	23	14	9	77	43	+34	83	Qualification for the First Division play-offs
6	Sheffield United	46	19	17	10	69	54	+15	74	Qualification for the First Division play-offs
7	Birmingham City	46	19	17	10	60	35	+25	74	
8	Stockport County	46	19	8	19	71	69	+2	65	
9	Wolverhampton Wanderers	46	18	11	17	57	53	+4	65	
10	West Bromwich Albion	46	16	13	17	50	56	−6	61	
11	Crewe Alexandra	46	18	5	23	58	65	−7	59	
12	Oxford United	46	16	10	20	60	64	−4	58	
13	Bradford City	46	14	15	17	46	59	−13	57	
14	Tranmere Rovers	46	14	14	18	54	57	−3	56	
15	Norwich City	46	14	13	19	52	69	−17	55	
16	Huddersfield Town	46	14	11	21	50	72	−22	53	
17	Bury	46	11	19	16	42	58	−16	52	
18	Swindon Town	46	14	10	22	42	73	−31	52	
19	Port Vale	46	13	10	23	56	66	−10	49	
20	Portsmouth	46	13	10	23	51	63	−12	49	
21	Queens Park Rangers	46	10	19	17	51	63	−12	49	
22	Manchester City (R)	46	12	12	22	56	57	−1	48	Relegation to the Second Division
23	Stoke City (R)	46	11	13	22	44	74	−30	46	Relegation to the Second Division
24	Reading (R)	46	11	9	26	39	78	−39	42	Relegation to the Second Division

Source: Statto.com
Rules for classification: 1) Points; 2) Goals scored; 3) Goal difference
(C) Champions; (O) Play-off winners; (P) Promoted; (R) Relegated

=== Play-offs ===
Semifinals; 1st leg – 10 May; 2nd leg – 13 May 1998
3rd	Sunderland	1	2	3
6th	Sheffield United	2	0	2
4th	Charlton Athletic	1	1	2
5th	Ipswich Town	0	0	0

Final at Wembley; 25 May 1998
3rd	Sunderland	4 (6)
4th	Charlton Athletic (pen.)	4 (7)

=== Results ===
Home \ Away	BIR	BRA	BRY	CHA	CRE	HUD	IPS	MCI	MID	NWC	NOT	OXF	PTV	POR	QPR	REA	SHU	STP	STK	SUN	SWI	TRA	WBA	WOL
Birmingham City		0–0	1–3	0–0	0–1	0–0	1–1	2–1	1–1	1–2	1–2	0–0	1–1	2–1	1–0	3–0	2–0	4–1	2–0	0–1	3–0	0–0	1–0	1–0
Bradford City	0–0		1–0	1–0	1–0	1–1	2–1	2–1	2–2	2–1	0–3	0–0	2–1	1–3	1–1	4–1	1–1	2–1	0–0	0–4	1–1	0–1	0–0	2–0
Bury	2–1	2–0		0–0	1–1	2–2	0–1	1–1	0–1	1–0	2–0	1–0	2–2	0–2	1–1	1–1	1–1	0–1	0–0	1–1	1–0	1–0	1–3	1–3
Charlton Athletic	1–1	4–1	0–0		3–2	1–0	3–0	2–1	3–0	2–1	4–2	3–2	1–0	1–0	1–1	3–0	2–1	1–3	1–1	1–1	3–0	2–0	5–0	1–0
Crewe Alexandra	0–2	5–0	1–2	0–3		2–5	0–0	1–0	1–1	1–0	1–4	2–1	0–1	3–1	2–3	1–0	2–1	0–1	2–0	0–3	2–0	2–1	2–3	0–2
Huddersfield Town	0–1	1–2	2–0	0–3	2–0		2–2	1–3	0–1	1–3	0–2	5–1	0–4	1–1	1–1	1–0	0–0	1–0	3–1	2–3	0–0	3–0	1–0	1–0
Ipswich Town	0–1	2–1	2–0	3–1	3–2	5–1		1–0	1–1	5–0	0–1	5–2	5–1	2–0	0–0	1–0	2–2	0–2	2–3	2–0	2–1	0–0	1–1	3–0
Manchester City	0–1	1–0	0–1	2–2	1–0	0–1	1–2		2–0	1–2	2–3	0–2	2–3	2–2	2–2	0–0	0–0	4–1	0–1	0–1	6–0	1–1	1–0	0–1
Middlesbrough	3–1	1–0	4–0	2–1	1–0	3–0	1–1	1–0		3–0	0–0	4–1	2–1	1–1	3–0	4–0	1–2	3–1	0–1	3–1	6–0	3–0	1–0	1–1
Norwich City	3–3	2–3	2–2	0–4	0–2	5–0	2–1	0–0	1–3		1–0	2–1	1–0	2–0	0–0	0–0	2–1	1–1	0–0	2–1	5–0	0–2	1–1	0–2
Nottingham Forest	1–0	2–2	3–0	5–2	3–1	3–0	2–1	1–3	4–0	2–3		1–3	2–1	1–0	4–0	1–0	3–0	2–1	1–0	0–3	3–0	2–2	1–0	3–0
Oxford United	0–2	0–0	1–1	1–2	0–0	2–0	1–0	0–0	1–4	2–0	0–1		2–0	1–0	3–1	3–0	2–4	3–0	5–1	1–1	2–1	1–1	2–1	3–0
Port Vale	0–1	0–0	1–1	0–1	2–3	4–1	1–3	2–1	0–1	2–2	0–1	3–0		2–1	2–0	0–0	0–0	2–1	0–0	3–1	0–1	0–1	1–2	0–2
Portsmouth	1–1	1–1	1–1	0–2	2–3	3–0	0–1	0–3	0–0	1–1	0–1	2–1	3–1		3–1	0–2	1–1	1–0	2–0	1–4	0–1	1–0	2–3	3–2
Queens Park Rangers	1–1	1–0	0–1	2–4	3–2	2–1	0–0	2–0	5–0	1–1	0–1	1–1	0–1	1–0		1–1	2–2	2–1	1–1	0–1	1–2	0–0	2–0	0–0
Reading	2–0	0–3	1–1	2–0	3–3	0–2	0–4	3–0	0–1	0–1	3–3	2–1	0–3	0–1	1–2		0–1	1–0	2–0	4–0	0–1	1–3	2–1	0–0
Sheffield United	0–0	2–1	3–0	4–1	1–0	1–1	0–1	1–1	1–0	2–2	1–0	1–0	2–1	2–1	2–2	4–0		5–1	3–2	2–0	2–1	2–1	2–4	1–0
Stockport County	2–2	1–2	0–0	3–0	0–1	3–0	0–1	3–1	1–1	2–2	2–2	3–2	3–0	3–1	2–0	5–1	1–0		1–0	1–1	4–2	3–1	2–1	1–0
Stoke City	0–7	2–1	3–2	1–2	0–2	1–2	1–1	2–5	1–2	2–0	1–1	0–0	2–1	2–1	2–1	1–2	2–2	2–1		1–2	1–2	0–3	0–0	3–0
Sunderland	1–1	2–0	2–1	0–0	2–1	3–1	2–2	3–1	1–2	0–1	1–1	3–1	4–2	2–1	2–2	4–1	4–2	4–1	3–0		0–0	3–0	2–0	1–1
Swindon Town	1–1	1–0	3–1	0–1	2–0	1–1	0–2	1–3	1–2	1–0	0–0	4–1	4–2	0–1	3–1	0–2	1–1	1–1	1–0	1–2		2–1	0–2	0–0
Tranmere Rovers	0–3	3–1	0–0	2–2	0–3	1–0	1–1	0–0	0–2	2–0	0–0	0–2	1–2	2–2	2–1	6–0	3–3	3–0	3–1	0–2	3–0		0–0	2–1
West Bromwich Albion	1–0	1–1	1–1	1–0	0–1	0–2	2–3	0–1	2–1	1–0	1–1	1–2	2–2	0–3	1–1	1–0	2–0	3–2	1–1	3–3	0–0	2–1		1–0
Wolverhampton Wanderers	1–3	2–1	4–2	3–1	1–0	1–1	1–1	2–2	1–0	5–0	2–1	1–0	1–1	2–0	3–2	3–1	0–0	3–4	1–1	0–1	3–1	2–1	0–1	

Legend: Blue = home team win; Yellow = draw; Red = away team win.

=== Top scorers ===
Rank	Player	Club	Goals
1	(England) Kevin Phillips	Sunderland	29
=	(Netherlands) Pierre Van Hooijdonk	Nottingham Forest	29
3	(England) Kevin Campbell	Nottingham Forest	23
=	(England) Clive Mendonca	Charlton Athletic	23
5	(Jamaica) David Johnson	Ipswich Town	20
6	(England) Brett Angell	Stockport County	18
7	(England) Paul Furlong	Birmingham City	15
=	(England) Marcus Stewart	Huddersfield Town	15

=== Maps ===
Locations of the Football League First Division London teams 1997–1998
Locations of the Football League First Division 1997–1998 teams

=== Attendances ===
#	Club	Average
1	Sunderland	33,492
2	Middlesbrough	29,994
3	Manchester City	28,196
4	Wolverhampton Wanderers	23,281
5	Nottingham Forest	20,584
6	Birmingham City	18,708
7	Sheffield United	17,942
8	West Bromwich Albion	16,662
9	Bradford City	15,564
10	Stoke City	15,025
11	Ipswich Town	14,973
12	Norwich City	14,444
13	Charlton Athletic	13,275
14	Queens Park Rangers	13,083
15	Huddersfield Town	12,145
16	Portsmouth	11,149
17	Swindon Town	10,298
18	Reading	9,676
19	Port Vale	8,432
20	Stockport County	8,322
21	Tranmere Rovers	7,999
22	Oxford United	7,512
23	Bury	6,177
24	Crewe Alexandra	5,243

== Second Division ==
Having returned to the manager's seat at Watford following a disappointing 1996–97 season under Kenny Jackett, Graham Taylor guided Watford to the Division Two title to add to the three promotions he had won in his first spell at Vicarage Road between 1978 and 1982. John Ward, who had been dismissed by Bristol Rovers in 1996 after failing to deliver promotion, delivered the goods for their local rivals Bristol City, comfortably securing them promotion from Division Two as runners-up. The final promotion place was won by Grimsby Town, who in their first Wembley final victory defeated a Northampton Town side in hunt of a second successive promotion.

Grimsby had already defeated favourites Fulham in the semi-finals, meaning that Mohammed Al Fayed's revolution at Craven Cottage was on hold for a season. Since buying the club for £30million the previous summer, Al Fayed had appointed Kevin Keegan as director of football and Ray Wilkins as head coach, as well as providing transfer funds which meant that Fulham were able to compete with the leading Division One clubs and even some Premier League sides in the transfer market, the biggest fee being the £2.25million they paid Blackburn Rovers for defender Chris Coleman.

At the bottom end of the table, Alvin Martin endured a nightmare start to his managerial career as his Southend United side finished bottom of Division Two and suffered a second successive relegation. Carlisle United's dream of rising to the top of the English leagues under the ownership of Michael Knighton was becoming a nightmare as they suffered an instant relegation back to Division Three, despite the club's ambitious chairman taking charge of the first team for most of the season after axing Mervyn Day in the autumn. Plymouth Argyle were relegated to Division Three for the second time in four seasons. Brentford, beaten playoff finalists the previous season, went down on the final day of the season, with fallen giants Burnley being the lucky side who escaped relegation in the process. Surviving in Division Two was not enough to save the job of Burnley manager Chris Waddle, who was replaced soon afterwards by Bury manager Stan Ternent.

Football League, Second Division
- Season: 1997–98
- Champions: Watford (2nd third tier title)
- Direct promotion: Watford, Bristol City
- Promoted through play-offs: Grimsby Town
- Relegated: Brentford, Carlisle United, Plymouth Argyle, Southend United
- Matches: 552
- Goals: 1,337 (2.42 per match)
- Top goalscorer: Barry Hayles (Bristol Rovers), 23

=== Table ===
Pos	Team	Pld	W	D	L	GF	GA	GD	Pts	Promotion or relegation
1	Watford (C, P)	46	24	16	6	67	41	+26	88	Promotion to the First Division
2	Bristol City (P)	46	25	10	11	69	39	+30	85	Promotion to the First Division
3	Grimsby Town (O, P)	46	19	15	12	55	37	+18	72	Qualification for the Second Division play-offs
4	Northampton Town	46	18	17	11	52	37	+15	71	Qualification for the Second Division play-offs
5	Bristol Rovers	46	20	10	16	70	64	+6	70	Qualification for the Second Division play-offs
6	Fulham	46	20	10	16	60	43	+17	70	Qualification for the Second Division play-offs
7	Wrexham	46	18	16	12	55	51	+4	70	
8	Gillingham	46	19	13	14	52	47	+5	70	
9	Bournemouth	46	18	12	16	57	52	+5	66	
10	Chesterfield	46	16	17	13	46	44	+2	65	
11	Wigan Athletic	46	17	11	18	64	66	−2	62	
12	Blackpool	46	17	11	18	59	67	−8	62	
13	Oldham Athletic	46	15	16	15	62	54	+8	61	
14	Wycombe Wanderers	46	14	18	14	51	53	−2	60	
15	Preston North End	46	15	14	17	56	56	0	59	
16	York City	46	14	17	15	52	58	−6	59	
17	Luton Town	46	14	15	17	60	64	−4	57	
18	Millwall	46	14	13	19	43	54	−11	55	
19	Walsall	46	14	12	20	43	52	−9	54	
20	Burnley	46	13	13	20	55	65	−10	52	
21	Brentford (R)	46	11	17	18	50	71	−21	50	Relegation to the Third Division
22	Plymouth Argyle (R)	46	12	13	21	55	70	−15	49	Relegation to the Third Division
23	Carlisle United (R)	46	12	8	26	57	73	−16	44	Relegation to the Third Division
24	Southend United (R)	46	11	10	25	47	79	−32	43	Relegation to the Third Division

Rules for classification: In the Football League goals scored (GF) takes precedence over goal difference (GD).
(C) Champions; (O) Play-off winners; (P) Promoted; (R) Relegated

=== Play-offs ===
Semifinals; 1st leg – 9/10 May; 2nd leg – 13 May 1998
3rd	Grimsby Town	1	1	2
6th	Fulham	1	0	1
4th	Northampton	1	3	4
5th	Bristol Rovers	3	0	3

Final at Wembley Stadium; 24 May 1998
3rd	Grimsby Town	1
4th	Northampton	0

=== Top scorers ===
Rank	Player	Club	Goals
1	(Jamaica) Barry Hayles	Bristol Rovers	23
2	(Nigeria) Ade Akinbiyi	Gillingham	21
3	(Canada) Carlo Corazzin	Plymouth Argyle	17
=	(England) Kevin Donovan	Grimsby Town	17
=	(England) Mark Stallard	Wycombe Wanderers	17
=	(Malta) Ian Stevens	Carlisle United	17
7	(England) Andy Cooke	Burnley	16
=	(England) David Lowe	Wigan Athletic	16
9	(England) Peter Beadle	Bristol Rovers	15
=	(England) Paul Moody	Fulham	15
11	(England) Lee Ashcroft	Preston North End	14
=	(Netherlands) Jeroen Boere	Southend United	14

=== Maps ===
Locations of the Football League Second Division London teams 1997–1998
Locations of the Football League Second Division 1997–1998 teams

=== Results ===
Home \ Away	BLP	BOU	BRE	BRC	BRR	BUR	CRL	CHF	FUL	GIL	GRI	LUT	MIL	NOR	OLD	PLY	PNE	STD	WAL	WAT	WIG	WRE	WYC	YOR
Blackpool		1–0	1–2	2–2	1–0	2–1	2–1	2–1	2–1	2–1	2–2	1–0	3–0	1–1	2–2	0–0	2–1	3–0	1–0	1–1	0–2	1–2	2–4	1–0
Bournemouth	2–0		0–0	1–0	1–1	2–1	3–2	2–0	2–1	4–0	0–1	1–1	0–0	3–0	0–0	3–3	0–2	2–1	1–0	0–1	1–0	0–1	0–0	0–0
Brentford	3–1	3–2		1–4	2–3	2–1	0–1	0–0	0–2	2–0	3–1	2–2	2–1	0–0	2–1	3–1	0–0	1–1	3–0	1–2	0–2	1–1	1–1	1–2
Bristol City	2–0	1–1	2–2		2–0	3–1	1–0	1–0	0–2	0–2	4–1	3–0	4–1	0–0	1–0	2–1	2–1	1–0	2–1	1–1	3–0	1–1	3–1	2–1
Bristol Rovers	0–3	5–3	2–1	1–2		1–0	3–1	3–1	2–3	1–2	0–4	2–1	2–1	0–2	3–1	1–1	2–2	2–0	2–0	1–2	5–0	1–0	3–1	1–2
Burnley	1–2	2–2	1–1	1–0	0–0		3–1	0–0	2–1	0–0	2–1	1–1	1–2	2–1	0–0	2–1	1–0	1–0	2–1	2–0	0–2	1–2	2–2	7–2
Carlisle United	1–1	0–1	1–2	0–3	3–1	2–1		0–2	2–0	2–1	0–1	0–1	1–0	0–2	3–1	2–2	0–2	5–0	1–1	0–2	1–0	2–2	0–0	1–2
Chesterfield	1–1	1–1	0–0	1–0	0–0	1–0	2–1		0–2	1–1	1–0	0–0	3–1	2–1	2–1	2–1	3–2	1–0	3–1	0–1	2–3	3–1	1–0	1–1
Fulham	1–0	0–1	1–0	1–0	1–0	1–0	5–0	1–1		3–0	0–2	0–0	1–2	1–1	3–1	2–0	2–1	2–0	1–1	1–2	2–0	1–0	0–0	1–1
Gillingham	1–1	2–1	3–1	2–0	1–1	2–0	1–0	1–0	2–0		0–2	2–1	1–3	1–0	2–1	2–1	0–0	1–2	2–1	2–2	0–0	1–1	1–0	0–0
Grimsby Town	1–1	2–1	3–1	2–0	1–1	2–0	1–0	1–0	2–0	0–2		2–1	1–3	1–0	2–1	2–1	0–0	1–2	2–1	2–2	0–0	1–1	1–0	0–0
Luton Town	3–0	1–2	2–0	0–0	2–4	2–3	3–2	3–0	1–4	2–2	2–2		0–2	2–2	1–1	3–0	1–3	1–0	0–1	0–4	1–1	2–4	0–0	3–0
Millwall	2–1	1–2	3–0	0–2	1–1	1–0	1–1	1–1	1–1	1–0	0–1	0–2		0–0	2–1	1–1	0–1	3–1	0–1	1–1	1–1	0–1	1–0	2–3
Northampton Town	2–0	0–2	4–0	2–1	1–1	0–1	2–1	0–0	1–0	2–1	2–1	1–0	2–0		0–0	2–1	2–2	3–1	3–2	0–1	1–0	0–1	2–0	1–1
Oldham Athletic	0–1	2–1	1–1	1–2	4–4	3–3	3–1	2–0	1–0	3–1	2–0	2–1	1–1	2–2		2–0	1–0	2–0	0–0	2–2	3–1	3–0	0–1	3–1
Plymouth Argyle	3–1	3–0	0–0	2–0	1–2	2–3	2–1	1–1	1–4	0–1	2–2	0–2	3–0	1–3	0–2		2–0	2–3	2–1	0–1	3–2	2–0	4–2	0–0
Preston North End	3–3	0–1	2–1	2–1	1–2	2–3	0–3	0–0	3–1	1–3	2–0	1–0	2–1	1–0	1–1	0–1		1–0	0–0	2–0	1–1	0–1	1–1	3–2
Southend United	2–1	5–3	3–1	0–2	1–1	1–0	1–1	0–2	1–0	0–0	0–1	1–2	0–0	0–0	1–1	3–0	3–2		0–1	0–3	1–0	1–3	1–2	4–4
Walsall	2–1	2–1	0–0	0–0	0–1	0–0	3–1	3–2	1–1	1–0	0–0	2–3	2–0	0–2	0–0	0–1	1–1	3–1		0–0	1–0	3–0	0–1	2–0
Watford	4–1	2–1	3–1	1–1	3–2	1–0	2–1	2–1	2–0	0–0	0–2	1–1	0–1	1–1	2–1	1–1	3–1	1–1	1–2		2–1	1–0	2–1	1–1
Wigan Athletic	3–0	1–0	4–0	0–3	3–0	5–1	0–2	2–1	2–1	1–4	0–2	1–1	0–0	1–1	1–0	1–1	1–4	1–3	2–0	3–2		3–2	5–2	1–1
Wrexham	3–4	2–1	2–2	2–1	1–0	0–0	2–2	0–0	0–3	0–0	0–0	2–1	1–0	1–0	3–1	1–1	0–0	3–1	2–1	1–1	2–2		2–0	1–2
Wycombe Wanderers	2–1	1–1	0–0	1–2	1–0	2–1	1–4	1–1	2–0	1–0	1–1	2–2	0–0	0–0	2–1	5–1	0–0	4–1	4–2	0–0	1–2	0–0		1–0
York City	1–1	0–1	3–1	0–1	0–1	3–1	4–3	0–1	0–1	2–1	0–0	1–2	2–2	0–0	0–0	1–0	1–0	1–1	1–0	1–1	2–2	1–0	2–0	

Updated to match(es) played on 16 September 2021. Source:
Legend: Blue = home team win; Yellow = draw; Red = away team win.

== Third Division ==
In his first full season as Notts County manager, Sam Allardyce took Notts County to the Division Three title with 99 points and made them the first Football League team to win promotion before the end of March, giving the Meadow Lane supporters some much needed cause for celebration after the previous six seasons had brought three relegations and a playoff defeat. Macclesfield Town finished runners-up to seal promotion in their first season as a Football League side, and were joined in the automatic promotion places by a Lincoln City side who reached the third tier for the first time in more than a decade. Colchester United clinched the final promotion place, beating Torquay United 1–0 in the Wembley promotion decider with a David Gregory goal.

Doncaster Rovers were relegated from the Football League after a catastrophic season which saw them win just four league games and suffer a league record of 34 defeats. The club's future was then secured when chairman Ken Richardson, who stood accused of trying to set fire to the club's dilapidated Belle Vue stadium as part of an alleged insurance scam, stood down and was succeeded by new owner John Ryan, who set about rebuilding the club on and off the field and ensuring a swift return to the Football League. Brighton finished 23rd for the second successive season, but were never in any real danger of relegation this time due to Doncaster's dismal form throughout the season. Hull City endured one of the worst seasons in their history, finishing third from bottom and with team-strengthening prospects for new player-manager Mark Hateley being restricted by rising debts. It was a similarly low ebb for Cardiff City, whose 21st-place finish was the second worst of their history, while Swansea City's 20th-place finish was their lowest since 1975.

Doncaster's place in the Football League was taken by Conference champions Halifax Town, who regained the league status which they had lost five years earlier.

Football League, Third Division
- Season: 1997–98
- Champions: Notts County (2nd fourth tier title)
- Direct promotion: Notts County, Lincoln City, Macclesfield Town
- Promoted through play-offs: Colchester United
- Relegated to Conference: Doncaster Rovers
- New team in League: Macclesfield Town
- Matches: 552
- Goals: 1,431 (2.59 per match)
- Top goalscorer: Gary Jones (Notts County), 28

=== Table ===
Pos	Team	Pld	W	D	L	GF	GA	GD	Pts	Promotion or relegation
1	Notts County (C, P)	46	29	12	5	82	43	+39	99	Promotion to the Second Division
2	Macclesfield Town (P)	46	23	13	10	63	44	+19	82	Promotion to the Second Division
3	Lincoln City (P)	46	20	15	11	60	51	+9	75	Promotion to the Second Division
4	Colchester United (O, P)	46	21	11	14	72	60	+12	74	Qualification for the Third Division play-offs
5	Torquay United	46	21	11	14	68	59	+9	74	Qualification for the Third Division play-offs
6	Scarborough	46	19	15	12	67	58	+9	72	Qualification for the Third Division play-offs
7	Barnet	46	19	13	14	61	51	+10	70	Qualification for the Third Division play-offs
8	Scunthorpe United	46	19	12	15	56	52	+4	69	
9	Rotherham United	46	16	19	11	67	61	+6	67	
10	Peterborough United	46	18	13	15	63	51	+12	67	
11	Leyton Orient	46	19	12	15	62	47	+15	66 (Note: Leyton Orient had 3 points deducted.)	
12	Mansfield Town	46	16	17	13	64	55	+9	65	
13	Shrewsbury Town	46	16	13	17	61	62	−1	61	
14	Chester City	46	17	10	19	60	61	−1	61	
15	Exeter City	46	15	15	16	68	63	+5	60	
16	Cambridge United	46	14	18	14	63	57	+6	60	
17	Hartlepool United	46	12	23	11	61	53	+8	59	
18	Rochdale	46	17	7	22	56	55	+1	58	
19	Darlington	46	14	12	20	56	72	−16	54	
20	Swansea City	46	13	11	22	49	62	−13	50	
21	Cardiff City	46	9	23	14	48	52	−4	50	
22	Hull City	46	11	8	27	56	83	−27	41	
23	Brighton & Hove Albion	46	6	17	23	38	66	−28	35	
24	Doncaster Rovers (R)	46	4	8	34	30	113	−83	20	Relegation to Football Conference

Rules for classification: In the Football League goals scored (GF) takes precedence over goal difference (GD).
(C) Champions; (O) Play-off winners; (P) Promoted; (R) Relegated

=== Play-offs ===
Semifinals; 1st leg – 10 May; 2nd leg – 13 May 1998
4th	Colchester United	0	3	3
7th	Barnet	1	1	2
5th	Torquay United	3	4	7
6th	Scarborough	1	1	2

Final at Wembley Stadium; 22 May 1998
4th	Colchester United	1
5th	Torquay United	0

=== Top scorers ===
Rank	Player	Club	Goals
1	(England) Gary Jones	Notts County	28
2	(England) Steve Whitehall	Mansfield Town	24
3	(Wales) Darran Rowbotham	Exeter City	21
4	(Northern Ireland) Jimmy Quinn	Peterborough United	20
5	(Wales) Carl Griffiths	Leyton Orient	18

=== Maps ===
Locations of the Football League Third Division London teams 1997–1998
Locations of the Football League Third Division teams 1997–1998

== See also ==
- 1997–98 in English football
