= 2000–01 Birmingham City F.C. season =

Birmingham City F.C.
2000–01 season
- Chairman: David Gold
- Manager: Trevor Francis
- Stadium: St Andrew's
- First Division: 5th
- Play-offs: Semi-finals
- FA Cup: Third round
- League Cup: Runners-up
- Top goalscorer: League: Geoff Horsfield; Marcelo (7); All: Geoff Horsfield (12)
- Highest home attendance: 29,150 (14 March 2001 vs Blackburn Rovers, First Division)
- Lowest home attendance: 8,960 (26 September 2000 vs Wycombe Wanderers, League Cup)
- Average home league attendance: 21,283
Home colours

The 2000–01 season was Birmingham City Football Club's 98th season in the English football league system. It ran from 1 July 2000 to 30 June 2001.

Led by manager Trevor Francis, the team repeated the previous season's fifth-place finish in the Football League First Division to qualify for the play-offs for a second consecutive season, but suffered another semi-final defeat, this time to Preston North End, losing 4–2 on penalties after drawing 2–2 over two legs. They were eliminated in the third round of the FA Cup, and reached the Football League Cup final for the first time since 1963, facing Liverpool. Liverpool took the lead in the 30th minute through Robbie Fowler, but Birmingham equalised in the last minute of normal time with a Darren Purse penalty. No further goals were scored in extra time, so the match was settled in a penalty shoot-out; Martin Grainger's and Andrew Johnson's penalties were saved, and Liverpool won 5–4 on penalties.

The top scorer for the season was Geoff Horsfield, with twelve goals in all competitions, of which seven were in the League; Marcelo also scored seven league goals.

== Kit ==
French apparel manufacturers Le Coq Sportif remained Birmingham's kit suppliers for the third season in a row, and introduced a new kit for the season. Auto Windscreens remained the kit sponsors, also for the third consecutive season.

== Football League First Division ==
=== Match details ===
General sources: Match content not verifiable from these sources is referenced individually.

Date	League position	Opponents	Venue	Result	Score F–A	Scorers	Attendance	Refs
12 August 2000	11th	Queens Park Rangers	A	D	0–0		13,926	
18 August 2000	16th	Fulham	H	L	1–3	Sonner 36'	21,659	
26 August 2000	14th	Nottingham Forest	A	W	2–1	Marcelo 16', Eaden 45'	18,820	
28 August 2000	5th	Barnsley	H	W	4–1	Ndlovu 9', Grainger 35' pen., Holdsworth 51', Hughes 90'	17,160	
9 September 2000	6th	Sheffield United	H	W	1–0	O'Connor 9' pen.	21,493	
12 September 2000	4th	Preston North End	H	W	3–1	Ndlovu 58', A. Johnson 65', O'Connor 78' pen.	16,484	
17 September 2000	4th	West Bromwich Albion	A	D	1–1	Horsfield 61'	19,858	
23 September 2000	4th	Tranmere Rovers	H	W	2–0	Grainger 73', Horsfield 90'	17,640	
1 October 2000	5th	Watford	A	L	0–2		12,355	
8 October 2000	4th	Crewe Alexandra	A	W	2–0	Hughes 54', Marcelo 81'	6,829	
14 October 2000	4th	Crystal Palace	H	W	2–1	Burchill 72', Adebola 85'	17,191	
17 October 2000	3rd	Stockport County	H	W	4–0	Horsfield 13', Grainger 70' pen., Burchill (2) 80', 87'	15,579	
22 October 2000	3rd	Sheffield Wednesday	A	L	0–1		14,695	
25 October 2000	3rd	Gillingham	H	W	1–0	Marcelo 90'	26,044	
28 October 2000	3rd	Portsmouth	A	D	1–1	Eaden 48'	15,218	
4 November 2000	3rd	Bolton Wanderers	H	D	1–1	Grainger 50' pen.	20,043	
7 November 2000	3rd	Norwich City	A	L	0–1		13,900	
18 November 2000	4th	Burnley	H	W	3–2	Adebola 48', O'Connor 50', Burchill 86'	19,641	
25 November 2000	3rd	Huddersfield Town	H	W	2–1	Lazaridis 26', Horsfield 45'	22,120	
2 December 2000	2nd	Gillingham	A	W	2–1	M. Johnson 78', Horsfield 90'	9,247	
9 December 2000	3rd	Wimbledon	H	L	0–3		16,778	
17 December 2000	3rd	Wolverhampton Wanderers	A	W	1–0	Adebola 32'	19,938	
23 December 2000	3rd	Queens Park Rangers	H	D	0–0		24,311	
26 December 2000	4th	Blackburn Rovers	A	L	1–2	Purse 88'	24,899	
1 January 2001	6th	Nottingham Forest	H	L	0–2		20,034	
13 January 2001	6th	Barnsley	A	W	3–2	Marcelo 16', M. Johnson 40', Lazaridis 48'	13,631	
27 January 2001	5th	Fulham	A	W	1–0	Grainger 47'	15,482	
3 February 2001	5th	Norwich City	H	W	2–1	Hughes 9', Purse 62' pen.	18,551	
10 February 2001	6th	Sheffield United	A	L	1–3	Horsfield 89'	19,313	
17 February 2001	4th	West Bromwich Albion	H	W	2–1	Adebola 36', O'Connor 57'	25,025	
20 February 2001	4th	Preston North End	A	W	2–0	Grainger 11', A. Johnson 71'	14,864	
2 March 2001	4th	Watford	H	W	2–0	Eaden 45', Hughes 79'	20,724	
6 March 2001	4th	Crystal Palace	A	W	2–1	Upson 48' o.g., Adebola 59'	13,987	
10 March 2001	3rd	Crewe Alexandra	H	W	2–0	Purse 61' pen., A. Johnson 77'	28,042	
14 March 2001	4th	Blackburn Rovers	H	L	0–2		29,150	
17 March 2001	4th	Stockport County	A	L	0–2		7,176	
20 March 2001	4th	Grimsby Town	A	D	1–1	A. Johnson 10'	4,843	
24 March 2001	4th	Sheffield Wednesday	H	L	1–2	Horsfield 60'	19,733	
1 April 2001	4th	Wolverhampton Wanderers	H	L	0–1		24,003	
7 April 2001	4th	Wimbledon	A	L	1–3	Marcelo 86'	6,619	
10 April 2001	5th	Tranmere Rovers	A	L	0–1		8,004	
13 April 2001	4th	Bolton Wanderers	A	D	2–2	O'Connor 14', Marcelo 57'	15,025	
16 April 2001	4th	Portsmouth	H	D	0–0		23,304	
21 April 2001	5th	Burnley	A	D	0–0		17,057	
28 April 2001	5th	Grimsby Town	H	W	1–0	Marcelo 64'	24,822	
6 May 2001	5th	Huddersfield Town	A	W	2–1	Woodhouse (2) 21', 45'	19,290	

=== League table ===
Pos	Team	Pld	W	D	L	GF	GA	GD	Pts	Qualification or relegation
3	Bolton Wanderers (O, P)	46	24	15	7	76	45	+31	87	Qualification for the First Division play-offs
4	Preston North End	46	23	9	14	64	52	+12	78	Qualification for the First Division play-offs
5	Birmingham City	46	23	9	14	59	48	+11	78	Qualification for the First Division play-offs
6	West Bromwich Albion	46	21	11	14	60	52	+8	74	Qualification for the First Division play-offs
7	Burnley	46	21	9	16	50	54	−4	72	

Rules for classification: 1) Points; 2) Goal difference; 3) Goals scored
(O) Play-off winners; (P) Promoted

=== Results summary ===
Overall								Home						Away					
Pld	W	D	L	GF	GA	GD	Pts	W	D	L	GF	GA	GD	W	D	L	GF	GA	GD
46	23	9	14	59	48	+11	78	14	3	6	34	22	+12	9	6	8	25	26	−1

=== Play-offs ===
Round	Date	Opponents	Venue	Result	Score F–A	Scorers	Attendance	Refs
Semifinal 1st leg	13 May 2001	Preston North End	H	W	1–0	Eaden 54'	29,072	
Semifinal 2nd leg	17 May 2001	Preston North End	A	L	1–2 a.e.t. 2–4 pens.	Horsfield 58'	16,928	

== FA Cup ==
FA Cup match details
Round	Date	Opponents	Venue	Result	Score F–A	Scorers	Attendance	Refs
Third round	6 January 2001	Manchester City	A	L	2–3	Grainger 57', Adebola 61'	19,380	

== League Cup ==
General sources: Match content not verifiable from these sources is referenced individually.

League Cup match details
Round	Date	Opponents	Venue	Result	Score F–A	Scorers	Attendance	Refs
First round first leg	22 August 2000	Southend United	A	W	5–0	Eaden 5', Marcelo 10', M. Johnson 28', Adebola 74', Hughes 85'	3,694	
First round second leg	5 September 2000	Southend United	H	D	0–0; 5–0 agg.		9,507	
Second round first leg	19 September 2000	Wycombe Wanderers	A	W	4–3	Horsfield (2) 3', 22', A. Johnson (2) 24', 87'	2,537	
Second round second leg	26 September 2000	Wycombe Wanderers	H	W	1–0; 5–3 agg.	Ndlovu 66'	8,960	
Third round	31 October 2000	Tottenham Hotspur	A	W	3–1	Adebola (2) 15', 28', Burchill 45'	27,096	
Fourth round	29 November 2000	Newcastle United	H	W	2–1	Adebola 31', M. Johnson 90'	18,520	
Quarter-final	12 December 2000	Sheffield Wednesday	H	W	2–0	Sonner 28', Adebola 57'	22,911	
Semi-final first leg	9 January 2001	Ipswich Town	A	L	0–1		21,684	
Semi-final second leg	31 January 2001	Ipswich Town	H	W	4–1 a.e.t 4–2 agg.	Grainger 43', Horsfield (2) 56', 103', A. Johnson 117'	28,624	

=== Final ===
25 February 2001 Final	Liverpool	1–1 (a.e.t.) (5–4 p)	Birmingham City	Millennium Stadium, Cardiff
15:00	Fowler 30'		Purse 90' (pen.)	Attendance: 73,500; Referee: David Elleray
	Penalties
	McAllister (penalty scored); Barmby (penalty scored); Ziege (penalty scored); Hamann (penalty missed); Fowler (penalty scored); Carragher (penalty scored)		(penalty missed) Grainger; (penalty scored) Purse; (penalty scored) Marcelo; (penalty scored) Lazaridis; (penalty scored) Hughes; (penalty missed) A. Johnson

== Transfers ==
=== In ===
Date	Player	Club†	Fee	Ref
1 July 2000	David Burrows	(Coventry City)	Free	
5 July 2000	Nicky Eaden	(Barnsley)	Free	
10 July 2000	Geoff Horsfield	Fulham	£2.25m	
3 August 2000	Danny Sonner	(Sheffield Wednesday)	Free	
2 February 2001	Curtis Woodhouse	Sheffield United	£1m	

† Brackets round club names indicate the player's contract with that club had expired before he joined Birmingham.

=== Out ===
Date	Player	Fee	Joined†	Ref
28 June 2000	Gary Rowett	£3m	Leicester City	
January 2001	Jimmy Haarhoff	Free	Chester City	
2 February 2001	Peter Ndlovu	Released	(Sheffield United)	
9 February 2001	Steve Robinson	Undisclosed	Swindon Town	
10 April 2001	Simon Marsh	Released	(Tamworth)	
30 June 2001	Jon Bass	Released	(Hartlepool United)	
30 June 2001	James Dyson	Released	(Hednesford Town)	
30 June 2001	Kevin Poole	Released	(Birmingham City)	

† Brackets round a club denote the player joined that club after his Birmingham City contract expired.

=== Loan in ===
Date	Player	Club	Return	Ref
15 September 2000	Gary Charles	West Ham United	One month	
22 September 2000	Mark Burchill	Celtic	Three months	
13 November 2000	Richard Edghill	Manchester City	One month	
14 December 2000	Steve Jenkins	Huddersfield Town	One month	
9 February 2001	Carl Tiler	Charlton Athletic	21 February 2001	
13 February 2001	Peter Atherton	Bradford City	Three months	
16 March 2001	Jamie Pollock	Crystal Palace	17 May 2001	

=== Loan out ===
Date	Player	Club	Return	Ref
7 August 2000	Paul Furlong	Queens Park Rangers	Two months	

== Appearances and goals ==
Numbers in parentheses denote appearances made as a substitute.
Players marked † left the club during the playing season.
Players with names in italics and marked * were on loan from another club for the whole of their season with Birmingham.
Players listed with no appearances have been in the matchday squad but only as unused substitutes.
Key to positions: GK – Goalkeeper; DF – Defender; MF – Midfielder; FW – Forward

Players' appearances and goals by competition
No.	Pos.	Nat.	Name	League		FA Cup		League Cup		Play-offs		Total		Discipline	
No.	Pos.	Nat.	Name	Apps	Goals	Apps	Goals	Apps	Goals	Apps	Goals	Apps	Goals	A yellow rectangle, denoting the yellow penalty card shown to a player being cautioned	A red rectangle, denoting the red penalty card shown to a player being sent off
1	GK	ENG	Ian Bennett	45	0	1	0	10	0	2	0	58	0	2	0
2	DF	ENG	Nicky Eaden	44 (1)	3	1	0	10	1	1 (1)	1	56 (2)	5	4	0
3	DF	ENG	Martin Grainger	35	6	1	1	10	1	1	0	47	8	4	1
4	DF	ENG	David Burrows	8 (5)	0	0	0	0 (2)	0	0	0	8 (7)	0	1	0
5	DF	ENG	Darren Purse	34 (3)	3	1	0	8 (1)	1	2	0	45 (4)	4	9	1
6	DF	ENG	David Holdsworth	24 (5)	1	0	0	4	0	0 (1)	0	28 (6)	1	8	1
7	MF	NIR	Jon McCarthy	7 (8)	0	0	0	1	0	1 (1)	0	9 (9)	0	1	0
8	FW	BRA	Marcelo	16 (15)	7	0 (1)	0	2 (3)	1	2	0	20 (19)	8	3	0
9	FW	ENG	Geoff Horsfield	25 (9)	7	0 (1)	0	5 (1)	4	2	1	32 (11)	12	8	0
10	MF	ENG	Bryan Hughes	38 (7)	4	0 (1)	0	6 (3)	1	0 (2)	0	44 (13)	5	4	0
11	MF	AUS	Stan Lazaridis	26 (5)	2	1	0	5 (2)	0	1 (1)	0	33 (8)	2	3	0
12	MF	CAY	Martin O'Connor	28 (2)	5	1	0	9	0	2	0	40 (2)	5	8	0
13	GK	ENG	Kevin Poole	1	0	0	0	0	0	0	0	1	0	1	0
14	MF	ENG	Graham Hyde	1 (2)	0	0	0	0 (1)	0	0	0	1 (3)	0	1	0
15	DF	ENG	Jerry Gill	21 (8)	0	1	0	7	0	0	0	29 (8)	0	4	0
17	DF	JAM	Michael Johnson	39	2	1	0	8	2	2	0	50	4	4	0
18	MF	ENG	Steve Robinson †	0 (4)	0	0	0	0 (2)	0	0	0	0 (6)	0	0	0
18	MF	ENG	Jamie Pollock * †	4 (1)	0	0	0	0	0	0	0	4 (1)	0	1	0
19	FW	ENG	Andrew Johnson	20 (14)	4	0	0	1 (6)	3	0	0	21 (20)	7	4	0
19	DF	ENG	Gary Charles * †	3	0	0	0	0	0	0	0	3	0	0	0
20	MF	ENG	Jacques Williams	1 (2)	0	0	0	0 (1)	0	0	0	1 (3)	0	0	0
21	MF	COD	Trésor Luntala	0	0	0	0	0	0	0	0	0	0	0	0
22	DF	WAL	Steve Jenkins * †	3	0	0	0	1	0	0	0	4	0	2	0
23	DF	ENG	Jon Bass	0 (1)	0	0	0	0	0	0	0	0 (1)	0	0	0
24	FW	NGA	Dele Adebola	16 (15)	5	1	1	6 (2)	5	0	0	23 (17)	11	1	0
25	FW	ENG	Paul Furlong	0 (4)	0	0	0	0	0	0	0	0 (4)	0	0	0
26	FW	ZIM	Peter Ndlovu †	10 (2)	2	1	0	5 (1)	1	0	0	16 (3)	3	1	0
27	DF	NIR	Tony Capaldi	0	0	0	0	0	0	0	0	0	0	0	0
29	DF	ENG	Carl Tiler * †	1	0	0	0	0	0	0	0	1	0	0	0
29	DF	ENG	Peter Atherton *	10	0	0	0	0	0	2	0	12	0	0	0
29	DF	ENG	Richard Edghill * †	3	0	0	0	0	0	0	0	3	0	0	0
30	MF	ENG	Curtis Woodhouse	17	2	0	0	0	0	2	0	19	2	4	0
30	FW	SCO	Mark Burchill * †	4 (9)	4	0	0	0	0	3 (1)	1	7 (10)	5	0	0
32	MF	NIR	Danny Sonner	22 (4)	1	1	0	9	1	2	0	34 (4)	2	6	0
33	GK	ENG	Neil Barnes	0	0	0	0	0	0	0	0	0	0	0	0

Players not included in matchday squads
No.	Pos.	Nat.	Name
16	DF	ENG	James Dyson
22	DF	ENG	Simon Marsh
28	MF	NIR	Jimmy Haarhoff †
28	DF	ENG	Joey Hutchinson
31	GK	ENG	Darren Horrigan †
31	MF	FRA	Mickael Sabathier
