= 1999–2000 Birmingham City F.C. season =

Birmingham City F.C.
1999–2000 season
- Chairman: David Gold
- Manager: Trevor Francis
- Ground: St Andrew's
- Football League First Division: 5th
- Play-offs: Semi-final (eliminated by Barnsley)
- FA Cup: Fourth round (eliminated by Everton)
- League Cup: Fourth round (eliminated by West Ham United)
- Top goalscorer: League: Paul Furlong (11); All: Paul Furlong (11)
- Highest home attendance: 29,050 vs Wolverhampton Wanderers, 1 April 2000
- Lowest home attendance: 17,150 vs Stockport County, 29 January 2000
- Average home league attendance: 21,895
Home colours

The 1999–2000 season was Birmingham City Football Club's 97th in the Football League. They finished in fifth place in the Football League First Division, qualifying for the promotion play-offs, but lost the first leg of the semifinal 4–0 at home to Barnsley. Although they won the away leg, they were eliminated 5–2 on aggregate. Birmingham entered the 1999–2000 FA Cup at the third round and lost to Everton in the fourth, and after entering the League Cup in the first round and defeating Newcastle United in the third, lost to West Ham United in the fourth round.

Paul Furlong was top scorer with 11 goals, all scored in league competition.

== Football League First Division ==
=== Match details ===
| Date | League position | Opponents | Venue | Result | Score F–A | Scorers | Attendance | Report |
|---|---|---|---|---|---|---|---|---|
| 7 August 1999 | 6th | Fulham | H | D | 2–2 | Hughes 62', Lazaridis 85' | 24,042 | |
| 14 August 1999 | 4th | Norwich City | A | W | 1–0 | McCarthy 11' | 15,261 | |
| 21 August 1999 | 3rd | Port Vale | H | W | 4–2 | Hughes (2) 8', 51', Furlong (2) 18', 34' | 18,089 | |
| 27 August 1999 | 4th | Stockport County | A | L | 0–2 | | 6,115 | |
| 30 August 1999 | 3rd | Crewe Alexandra | H | W | 5–1 | M. Johnson 12', McCarthy 20', Furlong 30', Holdsworth 52', Ndlovu 77' | 24,085 | |
| 5 September 1999 | 2nd | Bolton Wanderers | A | D | 3–3 | Holdsworth 26', Furlong (2) 37', 45' | 11,668 | |
| 11 September 1999 | 3rd | West Bromwich Albion | H | D | 1–1 | A. Johnson 43' | 25,945 | |
| 18 September 1999 | 2nd | Ipswich Town | A | W | 1–0 | Furlong 10' pen. | 19,758 | |
| 25 September 1999 | 1st | Queens Park Rangers | H | W | 2–0 | Furlong (2) 44' pen., 64' pen. | 18,748 | |
| 2 October 1999 | 4th | Charlton Athletic | A | L | 0–1 | | 19,753 | |
| 8 October 1999 | 4th | Walsall | A | L | 0–1 | | 7,164 | |
| 16 October 1999 | 3rd | Crystal Palace | H | W | 2–0 | Purse 10', McCarthy 48' | 21,582 | |
| 19 October 1999 | 4th | Manchester City | H | L | 0–1 | | 22,126 | |
| 23 October 1999 | 5th | Grimsby Town | A | D | 1–1 | Wreh 37' | 6,266 | |
| 27 October 1999 | 5th | Queens Park Rangers | A | D | 2–2 | Marcelo (2) 74', 76' | 11,196 | |
| 30 October 1999 | 4th | Charlton Athletic | H | W | 1–0 | Hughes 25' | 19,172 | |
| 6 November 1999 | 6th | Portsmouth | A | D | 2–2 | Lazaridis 59', M. Johnson 62' | 12,756 | |
| 20 November 1999 | 10th | Barnsley | A | L | 1–2 | McCarthy 70' | 14,520 | |
| 23 November 1999 | 5th | Tranmere Rovers | H | W | 3–1 | Grainger 2' pen., Marcelo 27', Hyde 45' | 21,132 | |
| 27 November 1999 | 7th | Swindon Town | H | D | 1–1 | Grainger 26' | 22,620 | |
| 4 December 1999 | 7th | Fulham | A | D | 0–0 | | 12,290 | |
| 17 December 1999 | 8th | Wolverhampton Wanderers | A | L | 1–2 | Hughes 15' | 19,724 | |
| 26 December 1999 | 11th | Sheffield United | H | L | 0–2 | | 22,874 | |
| 28 December 1999 | 13th | Nottingham Forest | A | L | 0–1 | | 20,821 | |
| 3 January 2000 | 12th | Huddersfield Town | H | W | 1–0 | Hughes 1' | 19,558 | |
| 15 January 2000 | 11th | Norwich City | H | W | 2–0 | Grainger 16', 30' | 21,007 | |
| 22 January 2000 | 11th | Port Vale | A | L | 1–3 | Hughes 48' | 7,702 | |
| 29 January 2000 | 8th | Stockport County | H | W | 2–1 | Holdsworth 62', Hughes 72' | 17,150 | |
| 5 February 2000 | 7th | Crewe Alexandra | A | W | 3–2 | O'Connor 45' pen., Hughes 54', Adebola 70' | 6,289 | |
| 12 February 2000 | 6th | Bolton Wanderers | H | W | 2–1 | Rankin 50', Adebola 66' | 18,426 | |
| 15 February 2000 | 6th | Blackburn Rovers | H | W | 1–0 | O'Connor 33' | 20,719 | |
| 19 February 2000 | 5th | Swindon Town | A | W | 4–1 | Purse 11', Rankin 21', Adebola 26', Grainger 74' | 7,591 | |
| 27 February 2000 | 5th | Ipswich Town | H | D | 1–1 | Mowbray 17' o.g. | 20,493 | |
| 4 March 2000 | 5th | West Bromwich Albion | A | W | 3–0 | Adebola 6', 8', Marcelo 86' | 17,029 | |
| 7 March 2000 | 5th | Portsmouth | H | W | 1–0 | Marcelo 49' | 19,573 | |
| 11 March 2000 | 5th | Tranmere Rovers | A | L | 1–2 | Rowett 45' | 9,232 | |
| 18 March 2000 | 5th | Barnsley | H | W | 3–1 | Rankin 25', 63', Holdsworth 45' | 25,108 | |
| 22 March 2000 | 5th | Blackburn Rovers | A | L | 0–1 | | 18,096 | |
| 25 March 2000 | 6th | Sheffield United | A | W | 2–1 | Kozluk 52' o.g., Hughes 54' | 15,486 | |
| 1 April 2000 | 5th | Wolverhampton Wanderers | H | W | 1–0 | Holdsworth 53' | 29,050 | |
| 8 April 2000 | 5th | Huddersfield Town | A | D | 0–0 | | 16,961 | |
| 15 April 2000 | 6th | Nottingham Forest | H | L | 0–1 | | 23,006 | |
| 22 April 2000 | 5th | Crystal Palace | A | W | 2–0 | Austin 45' o.g., Furlong 61' | 17,144 | |
| 24 April 2000 | 5th | Walsall | H | W | 2–0 | Furlong (2) 70', 90' pen. | 24,268 | |
| 28 April 2000 | 5th | Manchester City | A | L | 0–1 | | 32,062 | |
| 7 May 2000 | 5th | Grimsby Town | H | D | 0–0 | | 25,263 | |

=== League table ===
| Pos | Team | Pld | W | D | L | GF | GA | GD | Pts | Qualification or relegation |
|---|---|---|---|---|---|---|---|---|---|---|
| 3 | Ipswich Town (O, P) | 46 | 25 | 12 | 9 | 71 | 42 | +29 | 87 | Qualification for the First Division play-offs |
| 4 | Barnsley | 46 | 24 | 10 | 12 | 88 | 67 | +21 | 82 | Qualification for the First Division play-offs |
| 5 | Birmingham City | 46 | 22 | 11 | 13 | 65 | 44 | +21 | 77 | Qualification for the First Division play-offs |
| 6 | Bolton Wanderers | 46 | 21 | 13 | 12 | 69 | 50 | +19 | 76 | Qualification for the First Division play-offs |
| 7 | Wolverhampton Wanderers | 46 | 21 | 11 | 14 | 64 | 48 | +16 | 74 | |

Rules for classification: 1) Points; 2) Goal difference; 3) Goals scored
(O) Play-off winners; (P) Promoted

=== Results summary ===
| Overall | | | | | | | | Home | | | | | | Away | | | | | |
| Pld | W | D | L | GF | GA | GD | Pts | W | D | L | GF | GA | GD | W | D | L | GF | GA | GD |
|---|---|---|---|---|---|---|---|---|---|---|---|---|---|---|---|---|---|---|---|
| 46 | 22 | 11 | 13 | 65 | 44 | +21 | 77 | 15 | 5 | 3 | 37 | 16 | +21 | 7 | 6 | 10 | 28 | 28 | 0 |

=== Play-offs ===
| Round | Date | Opponents | Venue | Result | Score F–A | Scorers | Attendance | Report |
|---|---|---|---|---|---|---|---|---|
| Semifinal 1st leg | 13 May 2000 | Barnsley | H | L | 0–4 | | 26,492 | |
| Semifinal 2nd leg | 18 May 2000 | Barnsley | A | W | 2–1; 2–5 agg. | Rowett 33', Marcelo 75' | 19,050 | |

== FA Cup ==
| Round | Date | Opponents | Venue | Result | Score F–A | Scorers | Attendance | Report |
|---|---|---|---|---|---|---|---|---|
| Third round | 11 December 1999 | Watford | A | W | 1–0 | Rowett 66' | 8,144 | |
| Fourth round | 8 January 2000 | Everton | A | L | 0–2 | | 25,405 | |

== League Cup ==
| Round | Date | Opponents | Venue | Result | Score F–A | Scorers | Attendance | Report |
|---|---|---|---|---|---|---|---|---|
| First round 1st leg | 10 August 1999 | Exeter City | H | W | 3–0 | A. Johnson 17', Richardson 42' o.g., Adebola 75' | 18,976 | |
| First round 2nd leg | 24 August 1999 | Exeter City | A | W | 2–1; 5–1 agg. | Richardson 22' o.g., O'Connor 50' | 2,338 | |
| Second round 1st leg | 14 September 1999 | Bristol Rovers | H | W | 2–0 | O'Connor 51' pen., Holdsworth 67' | 17,457 | |
| Second round 2nd leg | 21 September 1999 | Bristol Rovers | A | W | 1–0; 3–0 agg. | Rowett 48' | 5,456 | |
| Third round | 12 October 1999 | Newcastle United | H | W | 2–0 | O'Connor 45' pen., Purse 60' | 19,795 | |
| Fourth round | 30 November 1999 | West Ham United | H | L | 2–3 | Hyde 8', Grainger 44' | 17,728 | |

== Transfers ==
=== In ===
| Date | Player | Club† | Fee | Ref |
|---|---|---|---|---|
| 6 July 1999 | Eddie Newton | (Chelsea) | Free | |
| 16 July 1999 | Trésor Luntala | Rennes | Free | |
| 16 July 1999 | Jacques Williams | Bordeaux | Free | |
| 28 July 1999 | Stan Lazaridis | West Ham United | £2m | |
| 25 October 1999 | Marcelo | Sheffield United | £500,000 | |

† Brackets round club names indicate the player's contract with that club had expired before he joined Birmingham.

=== Out ===
| Date | Player | Fee | Joined† | Ref |
|---|---|---|---|---|
| 7 July 1999 | Tony Hey | Free | Peterborough United | |
| 23 September 1999 | Howard Forinton | £250,000 | Peterborough United | |
| 2 November 1999 | Simon Rea | Free | Peterborough United | |
| 31 December 1999 | Gary Ablett | Released | (Blackpool) | |
| 3 February 2000 | Chris Holland | £100,000 | Huddersfield Town | |
| 22 March 2000 | Eddie Newton | Released | (Oxford United) | |
| 30 June 2000 | Simon Charlton | Released | (Bolton Wanderers) | |
| 30 June 2000 | Darren Wassall | Released | (Burton Albion) | |

† Brackets round a club denote the player joined that club after his Birmingham City contract expired.

=== Loan in ===
| Date | Player | Club | Return | Ref |
|---|---|---|---|---|
| 4 August 1999 | Richard Knight | Derby County | Two months | |
| 7 October 1999 | John Beresford | Southampton | One month | |
| 15 October 1999 | Allan Johnston | Sunderland | Two months | |
| 21 October 1999 | Christopher Wreh | Arsenal | 14 December 1999 | |
| 19 January 2000 | Isaiah Rankin | Bradford City | 7 April 2000 | |
| 23 February 2000 | Michael Carrick | West Ham United | 14 March 2000 | |
| 23 March 2000 | Stuart Campbell | Leicester City | 28 April 2000 | |
| 31 March 2000 | Thomas Myhre | Everton | End of season | |

=== Loan out ===
| Date | Player | Club | Return | Ref |
|---|---|---|---|---|
| 24 August 1999 | Simon Rea | Peterborough United | Made permanent | |
| 2 December 1999 | Gary Ablett | Wycombe Wanderers | One month | |
| 23 March 2000 | Jon Bass | Gillingham | 12 May 2000 | |

== Appearances and goals ==
Numbers in parentheses denote appearances made as a substitute.
Players marked † left the club during the playing season.
Players with names in italics and marked * were on loan from another club for the whole of their season with Birmingham.
Players listed with no appearances have been in the matchday squad but only as unused substitutes.
Key to positions: GK – Goalkeeper; DF – Defender; MF – Midfielder; FW – Forward

Players' appearances and goals by competition
| No. | Pos. | Nat. | Name | League | | FA Cup | | League Cup | | Play-offs | | Total | | Discipline | |
| No. | Pos. | Nat. | Name | Apps | Goals | Apps | Goals | Apps | Goals | Apps | Goals | Apps | Goals | A yellow rectangle, denoting the yellow penalty card shown to a player being cautioned | A red rectangle, denoting the red penalty card shown to a player being sent off |
|---|---|---|---|---|---|---|---|---|---|---|---|---|---|---|---|
| 1 | GK | ENG | Kevin Poole | 18 | 0 | 1 | 0 | 5 | 0 | 0 | 0 | 24 | 0 | 0 | 0 |
| 2 | DF | ENG | Gary Rowett | 45 | 1 | 2 | 1 | 5 | 1 | 2 | 1 | 54 | 4 | 4 | 0 |
| 3 | DF | ENG | Martin Grainger | 34 | 5 | 2 | 0 | 2 | 1 | 1 | 0 | 39 | 6 | 6 | 0 |
| 4 | MF | ENG | Bryan Hughes | 41 (4) | 10 | 2 | 0 | 3 (1) | 0 | 2 | 0 | 48 (5) | 10 | 4 | 1 |
| 5 | DF | ENG | Graham Hyde | 20 (10) | 1 | 2 | 0 | 2 (1) | 1 | 0 | 0 | 24 (11) | 2 | 4 | 1 |
| 6 | DF | ENG | David Holdsworth | 43 (1) | 5 | 1 | 0 | 5 | 1 | 2 | 0 | 51 (1) | 6 | 8 | 0 |
| 7 | MF | NIR | Jon McCarthy | 21 | 4 | 0 | 0 | 3 (1) | 0 | 0 | 0 | 27 (1) | 4 | 4 | 0 |
| 8 | MF | CAY | Martyn O'Connor | 38 (1) | 2 | 1 | 0 | 6 | 3 | 2 | 0 | 47 (1) | 5 | 7 | 1 |
| 9 | FW | ENG | Paul Furlong | 17 (2) | 11 | 0 | 0 | 2 | 0 | 2 | 0 | 21 (2) | 11 | 6 | 0 |
| 10 | FW | NGA | Dele Adebola | 21 (21) | 5 | 0 (1) | 0 | 3 (2) | 1 | 0 (1) | 0 | 24 (25) | 6 | 1 | 0 |
| 11 | FW | ZIM | Peter Ndlovu | 2 (11) | 1 | 0 | 0 | 3 (1) | 0 | 1 (1) | 0 | 6 (13) | 1 | 0 | 0 |
| 12 | DF | ENG | Simon Charlton | 19 (1) | 0 | 2 | 0 | 0 | 0 | 0 | 0 | 21 (1) | 0 | 1 | 0 |
| 13 | GK | ENG | Ian Bennett | 21 | 0 | 1 | 0 | 1 | 0 | 0 | 0 | 23 | 0 | 0 | 0 |
| 14 | MF | ENG | Eddie Newton † | 2 (2) | 0 | 0 (1) | 0 | 2 (2) | 0 | 0 | 0 | 4 (5) | 0 | 1 | 0 |
| 15 | DF | ENG | Darren Purse | 33 (5) | 2 | 1 | 0 | 5 | 1 | 2 | 0 | 41 (5) | 3 | 6 | 1 |
| 16 | FW | ENG | Isaiah Rankin * † | 11 (2) | 4 | 0 | 0 | 0 | 0 | 0 | 0 | 11 (2) | 4 | 6 | 1 |
| 17 | DF | JAM | Michael Johnson | 29 (5) | 2 | 2 | 0 | 3 | 0 | 2 | 0 | 36 (5) | 2 | 7 | 0 |
| 18 | MF | ENG | Steve Robinson | 5 (1) | 0 | 1 (1) | 0 | 0 | 0 | 0 | 0 | 6 (2) | 0 | 1 | 0 |
| 19 | DF | ENG | Darren Wassall | 0 | 0 | 0 | 0 | 1 | 0 | 0 | 0 | 1 | 0 | 0 | 0 |
| 20 | DF | ENG | Jon Bass | 5 (3) | 0 | 1 | 0 | 2 | 0 | 0 | 0 | 8 (3) | 0 | 1 | 0 |
| 21 | DF | ENG | Simon Marsh | 0 | 0 | 0 | 0 | 0 | 0 | 0 | 0 | 0 | 0 | 0 | 0 |
| 22 | MF | ENG | Chris Holland † | 2 (12) | 0 | 1 | 0 | 3 (1) | 0 | 0 | 0 | 6 (13) | 0 | 0 | 0 |
| 22 | MF | ENG | Michael Carrick * † | 1 (1) | 0 | 0 | 0 | 0 | 0 | 0 | 0 | 1 (1) | 0 | 0 | 0 |
| 23 | DF | ENG | Jerry Gill | 2 (9) | 0 | 1 | 0 | 1 (1) | 0 | 1 | 0 | 5 (10) | 0 | 1 | 0 |
| 24 | FW | ENG | Howard Forinton † | 0 (1) | 0 | 0 | 0 | 1 (2) | 0 | 0 | 0 | 1 (3) | 0 | 0 | 0 |
| 24 | MF | SCO | Stuart Campbell * | 0 (2) | 0 | 0 | 0 | 0 | 0 | 0 | 0 | 0 (2) | 0 | 0 | 0 |
| 25 | DF | ENG | James Dyson | 0 (2) | 0 | 0 | 0 | 0 (1) | 0 | 0 | 0 | 0 (3) | 0 | 1 | 0 |
| 26 | FW | ENG | Andrew Johnson | 15 (8) | 1 | 0 | 0 | 4 (1) | 1 | 1 (1) | 0 | 20 (10) | 2 | 2 | 0 |
| 28 | MF | AUS | Stan Lazaridis | 26 (5) | 2 | 1 | 0 | 5 (2) | 0 | 1 (1) | 0 | 33 (8) | 2 | 0 | 0 |
| 29 | GK | ENG | Richard Knight * † | 0 | 0 | 0 | 0 | 0 (1) | 0 | 0 | 0 | 0 (1) | 0 | 0 | 0 |
| 29 | DF | ENG | John Beresford * † | 1 | 0 | 0 | 0 | 0 | 0 | 0 | 0 | 1 | 0 | 0 | 0 |
| 29 | GK | NOR | Thomas Myhre * | 7 | 0 | 0 | 0 | 0 | 0 | 2 | 0 | 9 | 0 | 0 | 0 |
| 30 | MF | SCO | Allan Johnston * † | 7 (1) | 0 | 0 | 0 | 1 | 0 | 0 | 0 | 8 (1) | 0 | 1 | 0 |
| 31 | MF | NIR | Jimmy Haarhoff | 0 (1) | 0 | 0 | 0 | 0 | 0 | 0 | 0 | 0 (1) | 0 | 0 | 0 |
| 32 | MF | LBR | Christopher Wreh * † | 6 (1) | 1 | 0 | 0 | 0 | 0 | 0 | 0 | 6 (1) | 1 | 2 | 0 |
| 33 | FW | BRA | Marcelo | 14 (10) | 5 | 1 | 0 | 0 | 0 | 1 (1) | 1 | 16 (11) | 6 | 3 | 0 |
| 34 | MF | COD | Trésor Luntala | 0 | 0 | 0 | 0 | 0 | 0 | 0 | 0 | 0 | 0 | 0 | 0 |

Players not included in matchday squads
| No. | Pos. | Nat. | Name |
|---|---|---|---|
| 16 | DF | ENG | Gary Ablett † |
| 27 | DF | ENG | Simon Rea † |
| 35 | MF | ENG | Jacques Williams |

== See also ==
- List of Birmingham City F.C. seasons
