= Bryan Hughes =

British footballer (born 1976)

Personal information
- Full name: Bryan Hughes
- Date of birth: 19 June 1976 (age 50)
- Place of birth: Liverpool, England
- Height: 5 ft 9 in (1.75 m)
- Position: Attacking midfielder

Youth career
- –1994: Wrexham

Senior career*
Years	Team	Apps	(Gls)
1994–1997	Wrexham	94	(12)
1997–2004	Birmingham City	248	(34)
2004–2007	Charlton Athletic	74	(5)
2007–2010	Hull City	41	(1)
2009	→ Derby County (loan)	3	(0)
2010–2011	Burton Albion	1	(0)
2011	Grimsby Town	3	(0)
2011	ÍBV Vestmannaeyjar	5	(0)
2011–2012	Accrington Stanley	21	(3)
2013–2015	Scarborough Athletic	32	(7)
Total		522	(62)

International career
1997	Football League Under-21 XI	1	(0)

Managerial career
- 2014–2015: Scarborough Athletic (joint manager)
- 2019: Wrexham
- * Club domestic league appearances and goals

Bryan Hughes (born 19 June 1976) is an English football manager and former professional footballer.

He played as a midfielder from 1994 to 2015, notably Premier League for Birmingham City, Charlton Athletic and Hull City as well as featuring in the Football League for Wrexham, Derby County, Burton Albion and Accrington Stanley, in the Conference for Grimsby Town, and for Icelandic club ÍBV Vestmannaeyjar. He finished his career at non-league club Scarborough Athletic.

Hughes went into coaching, first as player-coach and joint manager of Scarborough Athletic, then at a York-based academy, and most recently as manager of Wrexham.

== Playing career ==
=== Wrexham ===
Born in Liverpool, Merseyside, Hughes initially made his name at Wrexham, guiding them to the FA Cup quarter finals in 1996–97 with the goals he scored on that cup run. It was his performances in the FA Cup for Wrexham that caught the attention of Birmingham City. Hughes scored against Colwyn Bay, Scunthorpe United, West Ham United and Birmingham before the Welsh outfit bowed out to Chesterfield. In March 1997, Trevor Francis paid £1,000,000 to take him to St Andrew's.

=== Birmingham City ===
Hughes made a total of 293 appearances for the Blues, scoring 42 goals, and was an essential part of Steve Bruce's side's playoff-winning season in 2002, and their first and second seasons in the Premier League, before his switch to south-east London. While at Birmingham he played in the 2001 Football League Cup Final as a substitute; although he scored his penalty, Birmingham lost the shootout 5–4. Having rejected a new deal with Birmingham, in July 2004 he moved to Charlton Athletic, signing a three-year contract.

=== Charlton Athletic ===
Hughes made his debut for Charlton against Bolton Wanderers on 14 August 2004, when he came on as a substitute for Matt Holland who was injured after twelve minutes. He bagged a brace in a 4–1 FA Cup win over Rochdale at The Valley in January 2005 – his first goals for the club – and scored for the Addicks in a victory over Yeovil Town in the fourth round. Hughes made 22 appearances for Charlton during the season, and scored his fourth and final goal of the season in the last game against Crystal Palace.

In 2005–06, he became the man who caused José Mourinho to lose his first match at Stamford Bridge as Chelsea manager. Included in the side for the third round of the League Cup, Hughes scored the winning penalty in the penalty shootout. He made 40 appearances in total for Charlton, and scored five goals.

On 30 December 2006, Hughes scored a last-minute winning goal against Aston Villa, providing new Charlton manager Alan Pardew with his first win for the club. However, he played less often for Charlton during the 2006–07 season, making 27 appearances and only scoring once as they were relegated from the Premier League.

=== Hull City ===
Hughes joined Championship club Hull City on a free transfer from Charlton Athletic on a three-year deal on 29 June 2007, He made his Hull debut in a 3–2 defeat against Plymouth Argyle on 11 August, and scored his first league goal for the Tigers in a 5–0 win against Southampton on 15 March 2008. He made 39 appearances that season, including all three playoff matches, as Hull were promoted to the Premier League for the first time in their history. He did not play as often in the next season in the Premier League, making only eight appearances.

Hughes signed for Derby County on a month's loan on 22 October 2009, and made three appearances before returning to Hull. His contract with Hull was mutually terminated before the close of the January 2010 transfer window.

=== Burton Albion ===
After trials with Championship club Cardiff City, Huddersfield Town, and Walsall, Hughes signed a one-month deal with Football League Two club Burton Albion on 14 December 2010. He made his debut on 1 January 2011 in a 1–1 home draw with Shrewsbury Town in which he was substituted in the 56th minute by Aaron Webster. That was his only appearance for the club, and he left when his contract expired.

=== Grimsby Town ===
After a trial with Conference National team Grimsby Town, in which he played in a behind-closed-doors friendly with Lincoln City, Hughes signed for the club on 31 January 2011 until the end of the season. He made his debut the next day in a 2–2 away draw with Southport. He only played three times for the club, and was among a number of players released at the end of the season by the club's new managerial duo Rob Scott and Paul Hurst.

=== ÍBV Vestmannaeyjar ===
In 2011, Hughes joined Icelandic club ÍBV Vestmannaeyjar, who were playing in the UEFA Europa League that season.

=== Accrington Stanley ===
On 27 October 2011, Hughes joined League Two club Accrington Stanley on non-contract terms. Assigned squad number 27, he made his Stanley debut in a 2–1 win over Bristol Rovers on 5 November. On 10 December, Hughes set up Pádraig Amond's opening goal as Stanley beat AFC Wimbledon 2–0. He scored his first goal for the club in a 3–1 victory over Torquay United on 17 December – his first goal in English football since 2008 – and scored the winner against Morecambe on Boxing Day. His contribution to the club's 10 points from a possible 12 in December earned him the League Two Player of the Month award. He made 22 appearances for Accrington, scoring three times, and left the club at the end of the season after contract negotiations broke down.

=== Scarborough Athletic ===
In March 2013, Hughes joined Scarborough Athletic of the Northern Counties East League Premier Division until the end of the season. He started his first game on 9 March against Pickering Town, and scored his first goal a week later in a 4–2 victory at Parkgate. In April 2014 he was appointed as one of manager Rudy Funk's joint assistant managers. Following Funk's resignation in November 2014, he was appointed joint manager alongside Paul Foot.

In October 2015, alongside his role with Scarborough, Hughes took up the post of head of coaching at the i2i International Soccer Academy, a facility associated with York St John University. Two months later, Hughes and Foot left Scarborough by mutual consent after a series of poor results.

== Managerial career ==
On 6 February 2019, Hughes was appointed as manager of National League club Wrexham on a three-and-a-half-year deal. His team finished the season in fourth place but lost in the play-off quarter-final. After the team went eight games without a win and dropped into the relegation places, Hughes was sacked on 25 September 2019.

== International career ==
He made one appearance for a Football League under-21 representative team in a friendly against an Italian Serie B under-21 team.

== Personal life ==
In 2014, Hughes was appointed as head of the UK footgolf academy scheme.

He now works as the head of football coaching at York St. John University.

== Career statistics ==
Appearances and goals by club, season and competition
Club	Season	League			National Cup		League Cup		Other		Total	
Club	Season	Division	Apps	Goals	Apps	Goals	Apps	Goals	Apps	Goals	Apps	Goals
Wrexham	1993–94	Second Division	11	0	0	0	0	0	0	0	11	0
Wrexham	1994–95	Second Division	38	9	4	1	1	0	4 (Note: Appearance(s) in Football League Trophy)	0	47	10
Wrexham	1995–96	Second Division	22	0	3	0	1	0	2	1	28	1
Wrexham	1996–97	Second Division	23	3	9	6	0	0	1	0	33	9
Wrexham	Total		94	12	16	7	2	0	7	1	119	20
Birmingham City	1996–97	First Division	11	0	—		—		—		11	0
Birmingham City	1997–98 (Note: Soccerbase omits Hughes' appearance on 15 November 1997 against Nottingham Forest.)	First Division	40	5	3	2	4	1	—		47	8
Birmingham City	1998–99	First Division	28	3	1	0	2	0	1 (Note: Appearance(s) in First Division play-offs)	0	32	3
Birmingham City	1999–2000	First Division	45	10	2	0	4	0	2	0	53	10
Birmingham City	2000–01	First Division	45	4	1	0	9	1	2	0	57	5
Birmingham City	2001–02	First Division	31	7	1	0	2	1	3	1	37	9
Birmingham City	2002–03	Premier League	22	2	1	0	1	0	—		24	2
Birmingham City	2003–04	Premier League	26	3	4	2	0	0	—		30	5
Birmingham City	Total		248	34	13	4	22	3	8	1	291	42
Charlton Athletic	2004–05	Premier League	17	1	3	3	2	0	—		22	4
Charlton Athletic	2005–06	Premier League	33	3	5	2	2	0	—		40	5
Charlton Athletic	2006–07	Premier League	24	1	0	0	3	0	—		27	1
Charlton Athletic	Total		74	5	8	5	7	0	—		89	10
Hull City	2007–08	Championship	35	1	0	0	1	0	3 (Note: Appearance(s) in Football League Championship play-offs)	0	39	1
Hull City	2008–09	Premier League	6	0	1	0	1	0	—		8	0
Hull City	2009–10	Premier League	0	0	0	0	0	0	—		0	0
Hull City	Total		41	1	1	0	2	0	3	0	47	1
Derby County (loan)	2009–10	Championship	3	0	—		—		—		3	0
Burton Albion	2010–11	League Two	1	0	0	0	—		—		1	0
Grimsby Town	2010–11	Conference Premier	3	0	—		—		—		3	0
ÍBV	2011	Úrvalsdeild	5	0	2	1	—		2 (Note: Appearances in UEFA Europa League)	0	9	1
Accrington Stanley	2011–12	League Two	21	3	1	0	—		—		22	3
Career total			490	55	41	17	33	3	20	2	584	77

== Honours ==
Birmingham City

- Football League First Division play-offs: 2002
- Football League Cup runner-up: 2000–01

Hull City

- Football League Championship play-offs: 2008

Individual

- PFA Team of the Year: 1996–97 Second Division
