= Horrigan =

Horrigan is a surname. Notable people with the surname include:

- Alfred F. Horrigan (1914–2005), American academic and university founder
- Bryan Horrigan (born 1962), Australian legal academic
- Darren Horrigan (born 1983), English footballer
- Jack Horrigan (sportswriter) (1925–1973), American sportswriter
- Jack Horrigan (rugby league)
- Liam Horrigan, Irish rugby league player

== See also ==
- 6176 Horrigan, a main-belt asteroid
