= Haarhoff =

Haarhoff is a surname. Notable people with the surname include:

- Dorian Haarhoff (born 1944), South African-Namibian writer and poet
- Jimmy Haarhoff (born 1981), Zambian footballer
- Pierre Haarhoff (1932–2024), French athlete
