= Jerry Gill =

British footballer (born 1970)

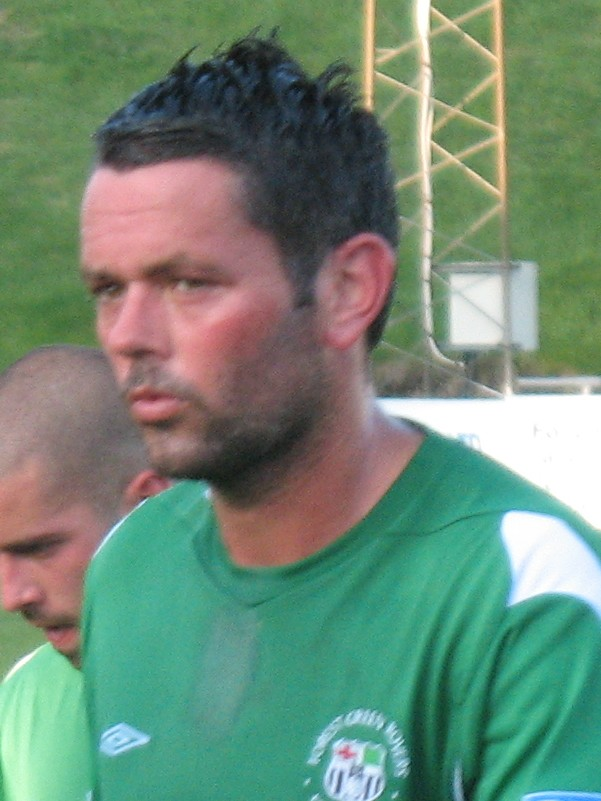
- Gill playing for Forest Green Rovers in 2008

Personal information
- Full name: Jeremy Morley Gill
- Date of birth: 8 September 1970 (age 56)
- Place of birth: Clevedon, England
- Height: 5 ft 8 in (1.73 m)
- Position: Defender

Youth career
- Parkway YC
- Backwell United

Senior career*
Years	Team	Apps	(Gls)
1987–1988	Trowbridge Town		
1988–1990	Leyton Orient	0	(0)
1990	Weston-super-Mare		
1990–1996	Bath City	164	(9)
1996–1997	Yeovil Town	41	(10)
1997–2002	Birmingham City	60	(0)
2002	→ Northampton Town (loan)	16	(0)
2002–2004	Northampton Town	25	(0)
2004–2009	Cheltenham Town	180	(0)
2008–2009	→ Forest Green Rovers (loan)	20	(0)
2009–2010	Redditch United		

International career
1997	England National Game XI	1	(0)

Managerial career
- 2010: Weymouth
- 2017–2024: Bath City
- * Club domestic league appearances and goals

Jeremy Morley Gill (born 8 September 1970) is an English former professional footballer who was most recently assistant manager of National League club Yeovil Town. Despite his late entry into the professional game – he made his debut in the Football League at the age of 27 – and a career-threatening injury sustained five years later, Gill played more than 250 Football League matches, for Birmingham City, Northampton Town and Cheltenham Town, and was still playing in Football League One, the third tier of English football, three weeks after his 38th birthday. He usually played at right-back, but could play elsewhere in defence or in midfield. His various managers viewed his strengths to be his professional approach to the game and the enthusiasm and whole-hearted determination he shows on the field.

Gill began his football career with non-league club Trowbridge Town. After an unsuccessful 18 months in London with Leyton Orient, he returned to the semi-professional game with Weston-super-Mare followed by six seasons with Bath City. A season at Yeovil Town, where his goals from midfield helped the club to promotion to the Conference, earned Gill selection for the England National Game XI – England's representative side for semi-professional players – and a transfer to the Football League with First Division club Birmingham City.

Though Gill struggled to establish himself with Birmingham, and was never an undisputed member of the starting eleven, he played a big part in the club's 2001 League Cup run, and was controversially omitted from the squad for the final. After Birmingham's promotion to the Premier League, he moved to Northampton Town, where he suffered knee ligament damage which ended his career with the club. He went on to spend four seasons with Cheltenham Town, helping them to promotion to League One via the play-offs. He spent most of the 2008–09 season as player-coach of Conference National club Forest Green Rovers. After two unsuccessful applications for managerial posts, and a spell playing for Conference North club Redditch United, Gill was appointed manager of Conference South club Weymouth in January 2010, only to resign 44 days later. He worked as youth team coach at Bristol Rovers, spent 18 months as academy director at Kidderminster Harriers, before being employed at Norwich City, initially as a scout then as an academy coach. He parted company with the Canaries in July 2015 and soon took up the role of U18 head coach at Wolverhampton Wanderers.

== Playing career ==
=== Early days ===
Gill was born in Clevedon, Somerset, and attended Backwell School. As a schoolboy he played football for Parkway Youth Club, alongside fellow future professional player Marcus Stewart, and for Backwell United, and was invited to join the Bristol Rovers youth team for a tournament in Germany. After losing in the final, Gill and his Rovers teammates indulged in the local beer to the extent that they were arrested and kept in police cells overnight. At the age of 16 he joined Trowbridge Town, then playing in the regional divisions of the Southern League (level 7 of the English football league system) under the management of Ken Knighton. The young Gill was spotted by Frank Clark, who had worked with Knighton at Sunderland and succeeded him as Leyton Orient manager, and Clark signed Gill on an 18-month contract in 1988. However, he found it difficult to settle – "moving to the east end of London from a small village was a real culture shock for me" – and returned to the West Country at the end of his contract without featuring for the Orient first team.

=== Bath City ===
In December 1990, after a brief stint with Weston-super-Mare, Gill joined Bath City, newly promoted to the Conference. In his first 18 months with the club he appeared only infrequently for the first team, but in the 1992–93 season he established himself as a first-team player and remained so for the duration of his Bath City career. In all he spent six seasons with the club on a semi-professional basis, playing part-time while working as a representative for a supplier of pitch care products, and made 218 appearances for the club in all competitions, scoring 14 goals. He helped the club reach the third round of the 1993–94 FA Cup, in which they held First Division club Stoke City to a goalless draw at Stoke before losing the replay 4–1.

Since 1986, Bath City had drawn a significant amount of income from allowing Football League club Bristol Rovers to share their Twerton Park ground; Rovers' return to Bristol at the end of the 1995–96 season meant that savings needed to be made, including cuts in the playing budget. Together with teammate Rob Cousins, Gill joined local rivals Yeovil Town for the 1996–97 season for a fee of £9,500.

=== Yeovil Town ===
Though Yeovil were at the time in the Isthmian League Premier Division, the level below the Conference, under player-manager Graham Roberts they were playing good football and were expected to challenge for promotion. Gill scored 16 goals in all competitions playing in central midfield, and was capped for the England National Game XI, England's representative team for semi-professional footballers, against an Ireland B team in Dublin. In 2002, the Football Association selected an "all-time" team of players capped at semi-professional level, "representing the very best of this level over the years". Gill occupied the right-back spot in this team, which had previously featured players such as Alan Smith and Steve Guppy who had gone on to represent England at full international level.

International selection attracted scouts from Football League clubs, and Gill was invited to Birmingham City to take part in trial matches. Halfway through the season, Roberts had brought striker Howard Forinton to Yeovil from Oxford City; his 23 goals in 21 games did much to secure the Isthmian League title and promotion to the Conference, and also caught the eye of Birmingham manager Trevor Francis. A deal was struck which saw Gill and Forinton join the First Division side in August 1997 for a combined fee of £100,000, with Gill valued at £30,000 plus an additional £10,000 payable when he played ten first-team matches.

=== Birmingham City ===
Gill spent nearly a full season at St Andrew's before he finally made his Football League debut, at the age of 27, on 18 April 1998 in a 3–0 defeat of Swindon Town. His second game for the club, away to Oxford United, was particularly eventful. With the score goalless, the referee first failed to award a penalty kick when Gill handled the ball in the penalty area, then disallowed the goal scored when the player deflected an opponent's cross into his own net; a few minutes later Gill was substituted, though he kept his place in the starting eleven for the next game. Then in the summer of 1998, Birmingham paid £1 million for Derby County's Gary Rowett. Installed as first-choice right back, in two seasons at the club Rowett missed only five league games. During this period Gill captained the reserve team to victories in the Birmingham Senior Cup in 1999 and 2000.

After Rowett made a £3 million move to Premier League club Leicester City, Gill faced competition from Nicky Eaden, newly arrived from Barnsley, Northern Ireland international winger Jon McCarthy, often used at right wing-back, and a variety of loan signings. Manager Francis said:

Jerry knows what the situation is. I think he's done very well for us, considering we plucked him out of non-league football at Yeovil. But he is aware that I have been looking for a right-back and I will continue looking for one. That doesn't mean I don't appreciate what Jerry has done for me since I signed him three-and-a-half years ago. There isn't a more reliable player at the club than Jerry Gill. He captains my reserve team, his fitness is of a very high standard and he has endless enthusiasm. When I put him in the first team, he never lets me down. I value Jerry's professionalism and for as long as I remain manager of Birmingham, there will always be a place for him here.

Gill signed a two-and-a-half-year contract in January 2001. Having taken part in most of the games in Birmingham's League Cup run, he was omitted from the first leg of the semi-final at Ipswich Town in favour of loan player Steve Jenkins. When Jenkins returned to his owning club, Gary Rowett said that Gill should be given a run of games in the Birmingham first team, suggesting that "if anything, he's too nice. He doesn't complain a lot and it's easy for people not to take notice of you. Perhaps if he moaned a bit more he'd get a start!" Recalled for the second leg, he produced an excellent performance, making a goal-line clearance from a header which would have left Birmingham two goals adrift had it crossed the line. Yet when it came to the final, manager Francis was unable to find a place for Gill even among the substitutes, preferring Eaden and McCarthy, making only his second start after recovering from a broken leg, in the starting eleven and David Holdsworth, a defender unavailable since the previous November due to serious illness, on the bench. Gill was devastated by this decision, describing it as "the biggest disappointment of [his] whole life".

Gill played in almost every game after the League Cup Final until Francis left the club the following October, but lost his place soon afterwards through injury. Though he did then receive a League Cup runners-up medal: club secretary Alan Jones had kept a spare one back, which he presented to Gill after Francis left. Under new manager Steve Bruce he played only one game, a 3–0 FA Cup defeat at Liverpool for which Jeff Kenna was cup-tied, and when the team won promotion to the Premier League that season, it became clear that his future lay elsewhere.

=== Northampton Town ===
At the start of the 2002–03 season Gill joined Second Division club Northampton Town on a month's loan. Northampton's manager, the former Birmingham player Kevan Broadhurst, praised his qualities of leadership and determination:

Jerry will lead at the back by example. He does not pull out of anything and if there is a tackle to be won he will win it.

The loan was twice extended for a further month, and on 11 November 2002 Gill left Birmingham permanently, signing for Northampton until the end of the season. His season proceeded successfully – a new two-year contract had been discussed, and he finished as runner-up for the club's Player of the Year award – until with two games remaining he damaged his anterior cruciate ligament and was expected to be out for several months. Northampton were prepared to give him a six-month contract, albeit on reduced wages, to allow him time to recover and prove his fitness. Birmingham City allowed him to use their facilities for his rehabilitation, and he recovered sufficiently to play a couple of reserve games for Northampton, but by that time new manager Colin Calderwood had other players in Gill's position and he was not offered another contract.

=== Cheltenham Town ===
Following a trial at the club, Gill signed for Cheltenham Town on 25 February 2004 on a non-contract basis until the end of the season. He was given a one-year contract for the 2004–05 season and, at the age of 34, played in all 46 league games; he believed that all the fitness work he did during rehabilitation from his knee injury had given him a new lease of life. Gill acted as regular deputy when club captain John Finnigan was unavailable through injury. For the following season, he was given another one-year contract, with an option for 2006–07 if he managed to play 20 games during the season. Not only did he start twice that number, he contributed to the club reaching the final of the League Two play-offs at the Millennium Stadium. His starting place and winners' medal, achieved with the help of his "excellent last-ditch defending", went some way to alleviate the disappointment of missing the 2001 League Cup final. In addition, his sales experience enabled the players to look smart for the occasion; expecting to be wearing tracksuits for their big day because the club was unable to afford a set of new suits, Gill persuaded a local outfitters to supply a set of suits at reasonable cost. While at Cheltenham Town he became a fan favourite and even had a song created by the fans who jokingly sung about his less than impressive goal scoring abilities, "If Jerry scores, We're on the pitch, if Jerry scores, We're on the pitch!" to the tune of Tom Hark.

By Christmas 2006, while the team worked towards maintaining their place in League One, Gill had already reached his target of 25 games for the whole season which triggered the offer of another year's contract; he chose to take up the offer. Gill missed only three games in all competitions in the 2007–08 season, and then signed a contract for yet another year with the club. Manager Keith Downing said:

Jerry's form has been impressively consistent over the past few seasons, he has maintained excellent fitness levels and will once again be a very valuable player for us next season. He is a very good professional who is always on the training field. That is why his career has lasted as long as it has. Jerry is a very good influence on the dressing room as well and I'm delighted that he will be staying with us.

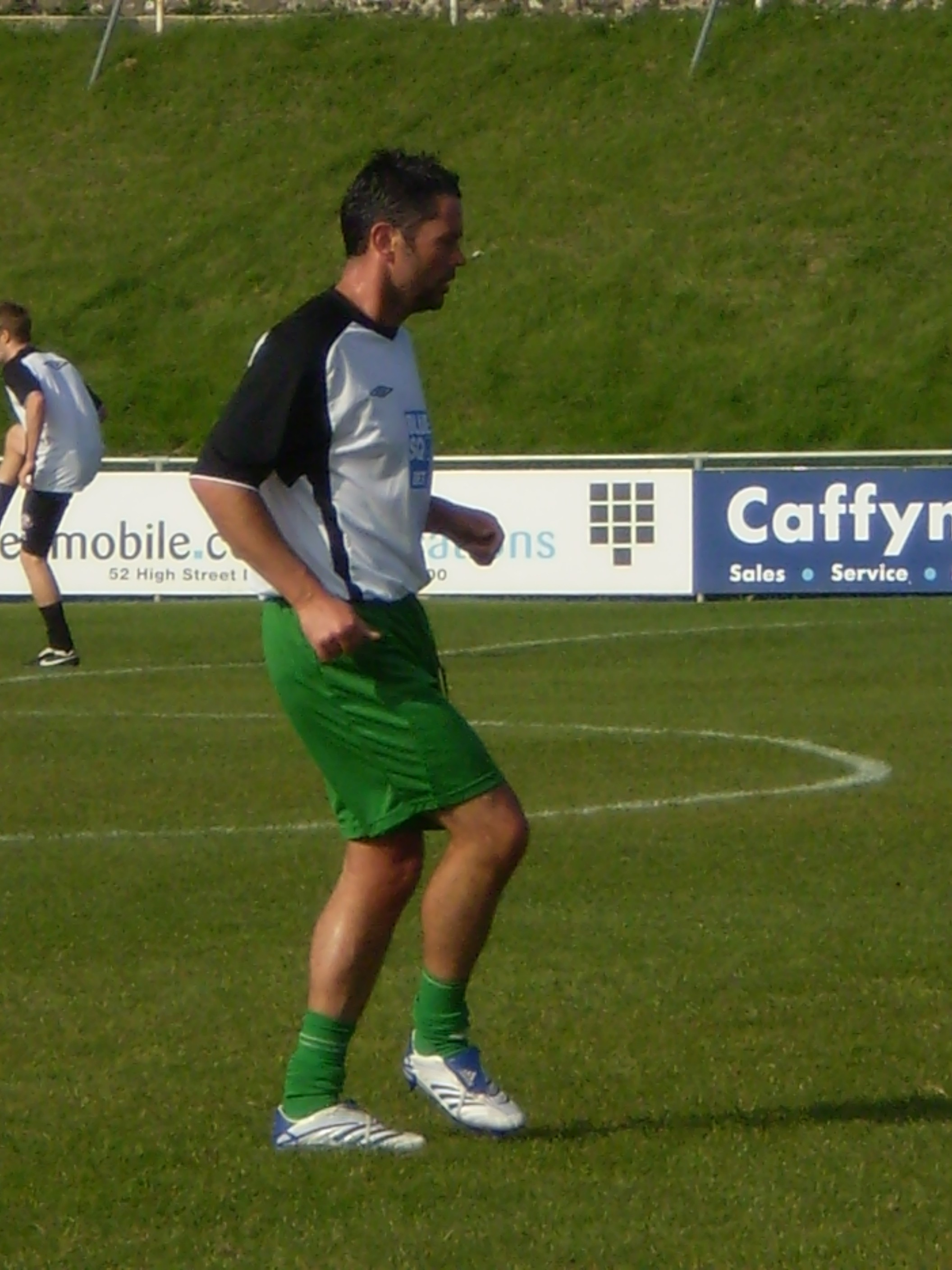
Gill warming up before a Forest Green match in October 2008

He made his 200th start for the club in August 2008, but was transfer-listed, together with five teammates, when Martin Allen replaced Downing as manager in September 2008. He had become involved with coaching at Cheltenham, but still felt capable of a playing role, albeit at a lower level, so saw Forest Green Rovers' offer of a role as player-coach as "too good an opportunity to miss".

=== Later career ===
Gill joined Forest Green Rovers as player-coach on 1 October 2008, initially on loan, expecting to make the move permanent when the transfer window opened in January 2009. He made his playing debut three days later, in the starting eleven in a 3–2 defeat at home to Wrexham. When January arrived, the loan was not made permanent, instead being extended until the end of the 2008–09 season. During a match against Oxford United in March 2009, Gill suffered a triple fracture to his cheekbone and eye socket when a "nudge" from opponent Chris Carruthers, a former teammate at Northampton Town, propelled him into the advertising boards surrounding the pitch with such force that he was unable to prevent his head taking the full impact of a collision with a steel bar. Surgery to insert a titanium plate into Gill's face was performed two days later, and he was restricted to a coaching role for the remainder of the season. He contributed to Forest Green avoiding relegation, and developed his skills by attending a fast-track coaching course at the end of which he received the UEFA "B" licence. In June 2009, the club made the financial decision that player David Brown would take over as assistant to manager Jim Harvey, and that Gill would leave the club.

During the summer of 2009 Gill worked as a coach in Birmingham City's youth system. He was shortlisted for the post of manager at Conference club Cambridge United, but lost out to the more experienced Martin Ling, and was a favourite to replace Harvey, dismissed by Forest Green, but was again unsuccessful. Gill signed for Conference North club Redditch United in September 2009, where he became a regular in the first team.

== Coaching career ==
In January 2010, Gill was appointed manager of Weymouth, then bottom of the Conference South. With the club already in financial difficulty, many first-team players left. Budgetary constraints meant Gill was unable to bring in replacements, and after 44 days in post, he resigned, feeling the job had become untenable. Weymouth's chairman claimed the cost of travelling from his Midlands home was a factor in his departure, a suggestion that Gill refuted. In mid-2010, he joined Bristol Rovers as youth team coach. He led the team to the third round of the FA Youth Cup, in which they lost narrowly to Aston Villa's youth team, before a management restructure at the club resulted in his departure.

In June 2011, Gill was appointed director of Kidderminster Harriers' new football academy. According to the director of sport at Stourbridge College, Harriers' academy partner, he "was instrumental in setting up the Football Academy and has laid down some very solid foundations in relation to shaping the discipline and attitude of our young players". He left Harriers in February 2013 to concentrate on scouting for Premier League club Norwich City, a role he had been involved with for some months on a part-time basis. He replaced Gary Holt, who departed to manage Falkirk, as Professional Development Phase Coach at Norwich City's academy, and was subsequently appointed as the U18s Academy Team Manager. He parted company with the club in July 2015 and soon took up the post of Academy U18 head coach at Wolverhampton Wanderers. He left his post with Wolves in March 2017.

On 5 October 2017, Gill was appointed first team manager of his former side Bath City.

On 18 November 2024, Gill left his role as first team manager of Bath City after he mutually agreed to part company with immediate effect.

On 5 April 2025, Gill was appointed Interim Assistant Head Coach of National League side Solihull Moors.

In June 2025, Gill was appointed assistant manager of recently relegated National League South side Dagenham & Redbridge. He stepped down from this role in September 2025.

On 24 September 2025, Gill was appointed assistant manager of his former side Yeovil Town until the end of the 2025–26 season.

== On and off the field ==
Gill has been popular wherever he has played. At Birmingham the fans used to greet him with a Jerry Springer-style chant of "Jerry! Jerry!", support which the player greatly appreciated. At the end of the 2000–01 season, he was chosen Birmingham's Clubman of the Year. Cheltenham manager John Ward told the Western Daily Press:

We played Birmingham City in pre-season and he got a lovely ovation from their supporters and it was the same at Yeovil last year. He got a lovely clap at Northampton a few weeks ago when he was taken off. I don't think that happened by coincidence. And I've got a feeling that if he leaves Cheltenham he will get a similar reception if he comes back with another club. Supporters recognise him and they see the whole-heartedness and the commitment and the ability that he has got.

When Gill did leave Cheltenham, chairman Paul Baker confirmed Ward's feeling:

Jerry has been a fantastic ambassador for the club following his arrival from Northampton some four years ago. He quickly established himself in the first team and became one of the fans' favourites with his consistent performances, cheery smile and friendly manner. Without question he has played a very important part in the club's success in achieving promotion and subsequently retaining our Coca-Cola League One status.

His enthusiasm for the game remained undaunted. Asked at the age of 37 what part of training he enjoyed, he replied "All of it. There's no better feeling than coming in, even on a cold day, and feeling fit and on top of your game."

Gill is married to Victoria and has a son. After the knee injury which threatened his career, he became involved with a company which helps sportspeople prepare themselves for life and work after their sporting career comes to an end. As of 2008, he was director of the sports marketing and retail company, Protech Sport, which managed the club shop at Cheltenham Town F.C. In his spare time he is a keen golfer.

== Career statistics ==
Appearances and goals by club, season and competition
Club	Season	League			FA Cup		League Cup		Other		Total	
Club	Season	Division	Apps	Goals	Apps	Goals	Apps	Goals	Apps	Goals	Apps	Goals
Bath City	1990–91	Conference	5	0	0	0	—		0	0	5	0
Bath City	1991–92	Conference	18	1		1	—			0	23	2
Bath City	1992–93	Conference	39	6	8	2	—		7	0	54	8
Bath City	1993–94	Conference	37	2		0	—			1	52	3
Bath City	1994–95	Conference	40	0		0	—			1	52	1
Bath City	1995–96	Conference	25	0		0	—			0	32	0
Bath City	Total		164	9		3	—			2	218	14
Yeovil Town	1996–97	Isthmian League; Premier Division	41	10	5	3	—		10 (Note: Four appearances in FA Trophy, four appearances and two goals in Isthmian League Cup, two appearances and one goal in Somerset Premier Cup)	3	56	16
Birmingham City	1997–98	First Division	3	0	0	0	0	0	—		3	0
Birmingham City	1998–99	First Division	3	0	0	0	1	0	0	0	4	0
Birmingham City	1999–2000	First Division	11	0	1	0	2	0	1 (Note: Appearance in First Division play-offs)	0	15	0
Birmingham City	2000–01	First Division	29	0	1	0	7	0	0	0	37	0
Birmingham City	2001–02	First Division	14	0	1	0	2	0	0	0	17	0
Birmingham City	2002–03	Premier League	0	0	0	0	0	0	—		0	0
Birmingham City	Total		60	0	3	0	12	0	1	0	76	0
Northampton Town (loan)	2002–03	Second Division	16	0	0	0	1	0	1 (Note: Appearance(s) in Football League Trophy)	0	18	0
Northampton Town	2002–03	Second Division	25	0	2	0	0	0	1	0	28	0
Northampton Town	2003–04	Third Division	0	0	0	0	0	0	0	0	0	0
Northampton Town	Total		41	0	2	0	1	0	2	0	46	0
Cheltenham Town	2003–04	Third Division	7	0	0	0	0	0	0	0	7	0
Cheltenham Town	2004–05	League Two	44	0	1	0	1	0	1	0	47	0
Cheltenham Town	2005–06	League Two	42	0	6	0	2	0	7 (Note: Four appearances in Football League Trophy, three appearances in League Two play-offs)	0	57	0
Cheltenham Town	2006–07	League One	39	0	2	0	2	0	1	0	44	0
Cheltenham Town	2007–08	League One	42	0	2	0	1	0	1	0	46	0
Cheltenham Town	2008–09	League One	6	0	0	0	2	0	0	0	8	0
Cheltenham Town	Total		180	0	11	0	8	0	10	0	209	0
Forest Green Rovers (loan)	2008–09	Conference Premier	20	0	3	0	—		3 (Note: Two appearances in FA Trophy, one appearance in Conference League Cup)	0	26	0
Career total			506	19		6	21	0		5	631	30

== Managerial statistics ==
As of 18 November 2024

Managerial record by team and tenure
Team	From	To	Record					Ref.
Team	From	To	P	W	D	L	Win %	Ref.
Weymouth	28 January 2010	11 March 2010	9	1	1	7	11.11	
Bath City	5 October 2017	18 November 2024	335	144	76	115	42.99	
Total			344	145	77	122	42.15	—

== Honours ==
Bath City

- Somerset Premier Cup: 1993–94, 1994–95

Yeovil Town

- Isthmian League Premier Division: 1996–97

Birmingham City

- Football League First Division promotion: 2001–02
- Football League Cup runner-up: 2000–01
- Birmingham Senior Cup: 1998–99, 1999–2000

Cheltenham Town

- Football League Two play-offs: 2006

Individual

- Birmingham City Clubman of the Year: 2000–01
