= Jon Bass (footballer) =

English footballer

Personal information
- Full name: Jonathan David Bass
- Date of birth: 1 July 1976 (age 50)
- Place of birth: Weston-super-Mare, England
- Height: 6 ft 0 in (1.83 m)
- Position: Full back

Youth career
- Birmingham City

Senior career*
Years	Team	Apps	(Gls)
1994–2001	Birmingham City	68	(0)
1996	→ Carlisle United (loan)	3	(0)
2000	→ Gillingham (loan)	7	(0)
2001–2005	Hartlepool United	24	(1)
2005	Pahang FA	28	(4)
2005–2006	Bristol Rovers	12	(0)
2006–2009	Salisbury City	68	(0)
Total		210	(5)
- * Club domestic league appearances and goals

Jonathan David Bass (born 1 July 1976) is an English former professional footballer.

He started his career with Birmingham City as a trainee in 1994. He played in the Blues' League Cup semi-final against Leeds United in 1996. Bass was Birmingham's first-choice right-back for the 1997–98 season, but lost his place to Jerry Gill towards the end of the season. The subsequent signing of Gary Rowett from Derby County in August 1998, pushed Bass further down the pecking order.

During the next three years Bass only made sporadic appearance for Birmingham, and had a loan spell at Gillingham in 2000. He was released from his contract at the end of the 2000–01 season, having made 68 league appearances for Birmingham.

Bass then had spells at Hartlepool United, Pahang FA in Malaysia and Bristol Rovers. After being released by Bristol Rovers at the end of the 2005–06 season, he left the professional game to become a quantity surveyor in the family business, before joining Salisbury City in July 2006 on a part-time basis. He retired from playing in 2009.
