= 2001 Football League Cup final =

- Match programme cover
- Event: 2000–01 Football League Cup
Birmingham City	Liverpool
1	1
- After extra time Liverpool won 5–4 on penalties
- Date: 25 February 2001
- Venue: Millennium Stadium, Cardiff
- Man of the Match: Robbie Fowler (Liverpool)
- Referee: David Elleray (Harrow)
- Attendance: 73,500

The 2001 Football League Cup final was a football match played between Birmingham City and Liverpool on 25 February 2001 at the Millennium Stadium, Cardiff. It was the final match of the 2000–01 Football League Cup, the 41st season of the Football League Cup, a football competition for the 92 teams in the Premier League and the English Football League. Liverpool were appearing in their eighth final; they had previously won six and lost two, while Birmingham were there for the second time. During their last appearance, they had previously beaten local rivals Aston Villa in the 1963 final.

As Birmingham were in the Football League and outside of the top-flight Premier League, they played two more rounds than Liverpool, who received a bye in the first and second rounds. Therefore, Birmingham progressed through six rounds to reach the final, whereas Liverpool progressed through four. The majority of Liverpool's matches were comfortable victories. They won all their ties by at least three goals except for their third round match with Chelsea, which they won 2–1. Birmingham matches ranged from comfortable victories to close affairs. They won their first round tie with Southend United 5–0, while their fourth round victory over Newcastle United was 2–1.

Liverpool won the match 5–4 on penalties after 90 minutes of normal time and 30 minutes of extra time could not split the two sides. Liverpool opened the scoring with a 25-yard long-range shot from Robbie Fowler in the 30th minute and appeared to be heading for a win in normal time until Birmingham equalised in injury-time with a penalty from Darren Purse, after Martin O'Connor was brought down by Stéphane Henchoz. Birmingham thought they had a valid claim for a second penalty in extra time, only for referee David Elleray to turn it down, taking the game to a penalty shoot-out. It was the first such penalty shoot-out in a major English domestic cup final (excluding Charity Shield matches).

The victory was Liverpool's first major trophy in six years since they won the same competition back in 1995. The club would also go on to win the FA Cup and the UEFA Cup in a unique treble of trophies in 2001.

== Route to the final ==
=== Birmingham City ===
Round	Opponents	Score
1st	Southend United (a)	5–0
1st	Southend United (h)	0–0
2nd	Wycombe Wanderers (a)	4–3
2nd	Wycombe Wanderers (h)	1–0
3rd	Tottenham Hotspur (a)	3–1
4th	Newcastle United (h)	2–1
QF	Sheffield Wednesday (h)	2–0
SF	Ipswich Town (a)	0–1
SF	Ipswich Town (h)	4–1

As Birmingham were in the First Division, they entered the competition in the first round. They were drawn against Southend United. Birmingham won the first leg at Southend's home ground Roots Hall 5–0, courtesy of goals from Nicky Eaden, Marcelo, Michael Johnson, Dele Adebola and Bryan Hughes. The second leg at Birmingham's home ground, St Andrew's finished 0–0, with Birmingham progressing to the second round with a 5–0 aggregate victory. Second Division team Wycombe Wanderers were the opposition in the second round. Birmingham established a three-goal lead by the 24th minute, courtesy of an own goal by Paul McCarthy, with goals from Johnson and striker Geoff Horsfield. However, by the 86th minute Wycombe had levelled the match with goals from Andy Rammell, Andy Baird and Jamie Bates. Parity was short-lived, as Birmingham scored a minute later through striker Andrew Johnson to win the first leg 4–3. Birmingham won the second leg at St Andrew's 1–0, courtesy of a Peter Ndlovu goal to win the tie 5–3 on aggregate.

Premier League team Tottenham Hotspur were the opposition in the third round. Birmingham took the lead in the match held at Tottenham's home ground, White Hart Lane, in the 15th minute when Adebola scored. He scored again in the 28th minute and a goal from Mark Burchill in the 45th minute gave Birmingham a 3–0 lead at half-time. Tottenham pulled a goal back through a penalty kick scored by Darren Anderton, but they were unable to level the match and Birmingham won 3–1. They faced Premier League team Newcastle United in the fourth round, with the match held at St Andrew's. Newcastle took the lead in the 14th minute when Kieron Dyer scored, but Birmingham equalised in the 31st minute when Adebola scored. The match remained level until the final minute when Michael Johnson scored to give Birmingham a 2–1 victory. Fellow First Division team Sheffield Wednesday were the opposition in the quarter-finals. Birmingham won the match 2–0, courtesy of goals from Danny Sonner and Adebola.

Birmingham were drawn against Premier League team Ipswich Town in the semi-finals. The first leg held at Ipswich's home ground, Portman Road, was won by the home side. A Marcus Stewart penalty secured a 1–0 victory. Birmingham took the lead in the second leg at St Andrew's when Horsfield scored in the 43rd minute. He scored again in the 55th minute, but Ipswich striker James Scowcroft scored a minute later. No further goals were scored up to full-time with the score at 2–1, but with the tie level at 2–2, it went to extra-time. Goals from Martin Grainger and Andrew Johnson secured a 4–1 victory and a 4–2 aggregate win to send Birmingham into the final.

=== Liverpool ===
Round	Opponents	Score
3rd	Chelsea (h)	2–1 (a.e.t.)
4th	Stoke City (a)	8–0
QF	Fulham (h)	3–0
SF	Crystal Palace (a)	1–2
SF	Crystal Palace (h)	5–0

As Liverpool were competing in the Premier League, they entered the competition in the third round and were drawn against fellow Premier League team Chelsea. Liverpool took the lead in the match held at their home ground, Anfield when midfielder Danny Murphy scored. Chelsea striker Gianfranco Zola equalised soon afterwards. Neither side was able to score a winning goal before full-time and the match went to extra time. Despite striker Emile Heskey being sent off for a clash with Winston Bogarde, striker Robbie Fowler scored to give Liverpool a 2–1 victory.

Liverpool were drawn against Second Division side Stoke City in the fourth round. The match held at Stoke's home ground, the Britannia Stadium resulted in an eight-goal victory for Liverpool. Fowler scored a hat-trick, with Murphy, Christian Ziege, Vladimír Šmicer, Nick Barmby and Sami Hyypiä scoring in the victory. Liverpool's opponents in the quarter-finals were First Division team Fulham. The match remained goalless throughout 90 minutes, with no goals scored until extra-time when Michael Owen, Šmicer and Barmby scored to secure a 3–0 victory.

First Division team Crystal Palace were Liverpool's opposition in the semi-finals. The first leg at Palace's home ground, Selhurst Park, was won 2–1 by the home side. Goals from Andrejs Rubins and Clinton Morrison, despite a late goal by Šmicer secured the victory. Liverpool recovered in the second leg, winning 5–0. Two goals from Murphy, with goals for Šmicer, Biscan and Fowler secured a 5–0 victory, which meant they won the tie 6–2 on aggregate to progress to the final.

== Match ==
=== Background ===
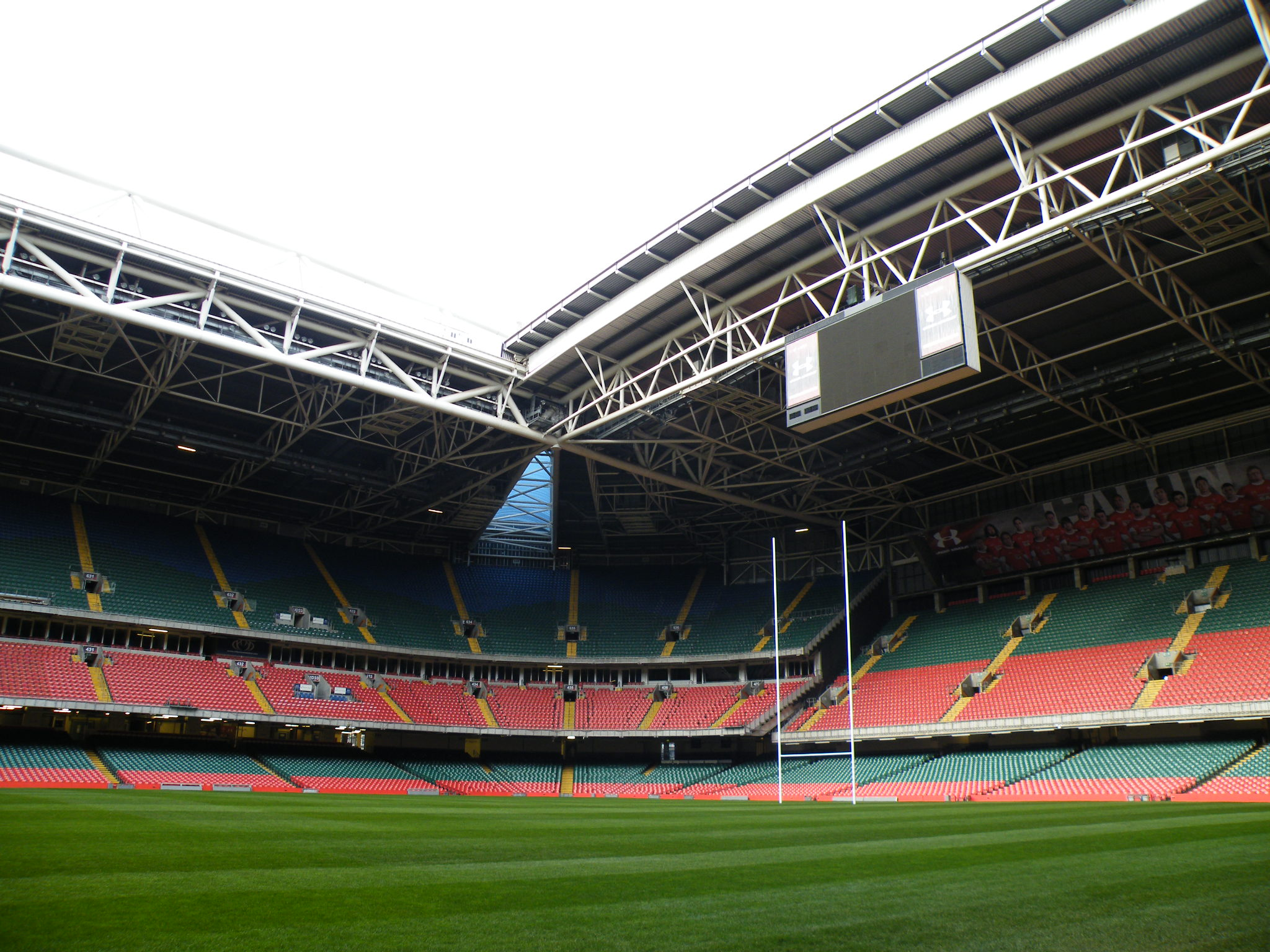
The Millennium Stadium in Cardiff was chosen to host the final due to the redevelopment of the traditional venue, Wembley Stadium.

In October 2000, Wembley Stadium, the final's traditional venue, was closed in anticipation of major redevelopment. The decision was made to stage the final at the Millennium Stadium in Cardiff. The chief executive of the Football League, David Burns, stated: "The stadium was always our first choice. I am absolutely certain it will provide a first-class venue for our games."

Liverpool were appearing in their eighth final they had won five (1981, 1982, 1983, 1984, 1995) and lost two (1978, 1987). This was Birmingham's second appearance in the final. They beat local rivals Aston Villa 3–1 over two legs in the 1963 final. The sides had previously met three times in the competition, Liverpool won the first match in the 1980–81 Football League Cup 3–1, while their fourth round tie in the 1983–84 Football League Cup, resulted in a 3–0 victory for Liverpool in a replay after the original match finished 1–1. Both occasions resulted in Liverpool going on to win the competition. Cardiff's Millennium Stadium was hosting the final for the first time; it took over as the venue for the event while the new Wembley Stadium underwent a six-year renovation between 2001 and 2006.

Liverpool's last match before the final was the second leg tie in the fourth round of the 2000–01 UEFA Cup against Italian team Roma. Liverpool lost the match 1–0, but progressed to the quarter-finals, as a result of their 2–0 victory in the first leg. Birmingham faced Preston North End in the First Division before the final. They won the match 2–0 courtesy of goals from Grainger and Andrew Johnson. After the victory, Birmingham manager Trevor Francis stated that his main aim for the season was to win promotion to the Premier League: "By five o'clock on Sunday we will have either won or lost the final, but there will still be 45 points to play for in the Nationwide First Division."

Liverpool manager Gérard Houllier was eager to win his first trophy at the club: "We always take each competition seriously, we have a duty to ourselves and to our supporters. I have made it clear throughout this run that when there is a place in Europe on offer it is important to try and get it. I have always stressed that we want to get into the Champions League this season. But I believe our chances of doing that will improve if we win the Worthington Cup. If that were to happen, we would be able to concentrate on our remaining league games under less pressure, which would be a huge help." Striker Fowler was delighted to be in the final, despite not being held at Wembley: "It doesn't matter that it's not at Wembley, it could be in my mate's back garden. It's a long time since we qualified for a final, we're just pleased to have one after all this time. The result will be so important, hopefully it will be a starting point for us."

Francis was pleasantly surprised that Birmingham had reached the final: "It has always been my ambition to take this club to the Premiership, getting to a cup final is not something I ever thought would happen. When you enter a competition as a First Division team, you hope for a good run but you don't realistically think you can get to the final. So to actually succeed in getting this far, becoming only the second Birmingham manager to do so, has given me unbelievable pleasure, it really has." Defender Grainger was delighted to have reached the final: "Some players never get through to a major final in their careers and you could see that a few of our lads were choked up immediately after the semi-final when they realised what we had achieved. For most of us the final will probably be the biggest game we will ever face. We've got a chance of winning a trophy and will give it our best shot."

=== Details ===
25 February 2001
15:00 GMT

Birmingham City	1–1 (a.e.t.)	Liverpool
Purse 90' (pen.)	Report	Fowler 30'
Penalties
Grainger (penalty missed); Purse (penalty scored); Marcelo (penalty scored); Lazaridis (penalty scored); Hughes (penalty scored); A. Johnson (penalty missed)	4–5	(penalty scored) McAllister; (penalty scored) Barmby; (penalty scored) Ziege; (penalty missed) Hamann; (penalty scored) Fowler; (penalty scored) Carragher

Millennium Stadium, Cardiff
Attendance: 73,500
Referee: David Elleray (London)

Birmingham City	Liverpool

GK	1	(England) Ian Bennett
RB	2	(England) Nicky Eaden
CB	5	(England) Darren Purse
CB	17	(Jamaica) Michael Johnson
LB	3	(England) Martin Grainger
RM	7	(Northern Ireland) Jon McCarthy
CM	12	(Cayman Islands) Martin O'Connor (c)
CM	32	(Northern Ireland) Danny Sonner	(substituted off) 71'
LM	11	(Australia) Stan Lazaridis
CF	24	(Nigeria) Dele Adebola	(substituted off) 45'
CF	9	(England) Geoff Horsfield	(substituted off) 80'
Substitutes:
GK	13	(England) Kevin Poole
DF	6	(England) David Holdsworth
MF	10	(England) Bryan Hughes	(substituted on) 71'
FW	8	(Brazil) Marcelo	(substituted on) 80'
FW	19	(England) Andrew Johnson	(substituted on) 45'
Manager:
(England) Trevor Francis

GK	1	(Netherlands) Sander Westerveld
RB	6	(Germany) Markus Babbel
CB	2	(Switzerland) Stéphane Henchoz	(yellow card) 109'
CB	12	(Finland) Sami Hyypiä
LB	23	(England) Jamie Carragher
RM	17	(England) Steven Gerrard		(substituted off) 78'
CM	16	(Germany) Dietmar Hamann	(yellow card) 108'
CM	25	(Croatia) Igor Bišćan		(substituted off) 96'
LM	7	(Czech Republic) Vladimír Šmicer		(substituted off) 83'
CF	8	(England) Emile Heskey
CF	9	(England) Robbie Fowler (c)
Substitutes:
GK	19	(France) Pegguy Arphexad
DF	3	(Germany) Christian Ziege		(substituted on) 96'
MF	20	(England) Nick Barmby		(substituted on) 83'
MF	21	(Scotland) Gary McAllister		(substituted on) 78'
FW	10	(England) Michael Owen
Manager:
(France) Gérard Houllier

Man of the match
Robbie Fowler (Liverpool)

Match officials

- Assistant referees:
  - K. Pike (Dorset)
  - P. R. Sharp (Hertfordshire)
- Fourth official: Paul Danson (Leicestershire and Rutland)

Match rules

- 90 minutes
- 30 minutes of extra-time if necessary
- Penalty shoot-out if scores still level
- Five named substitutes, of which up to three may be used

== Footnotes ==
- Haylett, Trevor (2001). Worthington Cup Final: Official Matchday Programme. Preston: The Football League. ISBN 1-903381-09-6.
