= Martin O'Connor (footballer) =

English footballer (born 1967)

Personal information
- Full name: Martin John O'Connor
- Date of birth: 10 December 1967 (age 58)
- Place of birth: Walsall, England
- Height: 5 ft 9 in (1.75 m)
- Position: Midfielder

Senior career*
Years	Team	Apps	(Gls)
19??–1992	Bromsgrove Rovers		
1992–1994	Crystal Palace	2	(0)
1993	→ Walsall (loan)	10	(1)
1994–1996	Walsall	94	(21)
1996	Peterborough United	18	(3)
1996–2002	Birmingham City	187	(16)
2002–2003	Walsall	48	(2)
2003–2005	Shrewsbury Town	56	(2)
2005–2006	Kidderminster Harriers	12	(0)
Total		427	(45)

International career
2000	Cayman Islands	2	(0)

Managerial career
- 2006–2007: Halesowen Town
- 2009–2011: Walsall (assistant manager)
- 2019: Walsall (caretaker)
- * Club domestic league appearances and goals

Martin John O'Connor (born 10 December 1967) is a football coach and former professional player. Born in England, he represented the Cayman Islands at international level.

== Club career ==
O'Connor was a late entrant to senior football. He joined Southern League Premier Division club Bromsgrove Rovers in his early 20s, and played his part in their winning the 1991–92 title. He signed for Crystal Palace for a £25,000 fee ahead of the inaugural Premier League season, but never appeared in that league. Instead, he made his Football League debut at the age of 25 during the first of three spells at Walsall, joining on loan in March 1993 before signing permanently the following year. He played a key role in the Saddlers winning promotion to Division Two in 1994–95.

He then joined Peterborough United, followed by Birmingham City, whom O'Connor represented in the 2001 Football League Cup Final against Liverpool, which Birmingham lost in a penalty shootout.

O'Connor re-joined Walsall in 2002, but his contract was not renewed at the end of the 2002–03 season. He then signed for Shrewsbury Town in July 2003, before ending his playing career with Kidderminster Harriers.

He was player-manager of Halesowen Town from November 2006 until October 2007. On 20 January 2009, he was named assistant manager to Chris Hutchings at Walsall, but the pair were sacked on 3 January 2011 after a series of poor results left Walsall bottom of Football League One.

After Dean Keates was sacked as Walsall manager in April 2019 with the team in the relegation places, O'Connor was appointed for the remaining five matches of the season. Despite overseeing a stunning 3–0 victory against Peterborough United on 27 April 2019 taking the fight for survival to the last game of the season, O'Connor ultimately could not stop the Saddlers' relegation to League Two. O'Connor was succeeded as Walsall manager by Darrell Clarke who signed a three-year contract on 10 May 2019.

== International career ==
O'Connor was called up to the Cayman Islands national team in 2000; his father was born in that country. He played twice before FIFA ruled that neither he nor many others who had been invited were eligible. The Cayman Islands had been attempting to exploit their status as a British Overseas Territory by picking British passport holders who would not ordinarily be eligible to play for them.

== Managerial statistics ==
As of match played 4 May 2019

Managerial record by team and tenure
Team	From	To	Record								Ref
Team	From	To	G	W	D	L	GF	GA	GD	Win %	Ref
Halesowen Town	23 November 2006	15 October 2007	42	19	13	10	63	48	+15	45.24	
Walsall (caretaker)	8 April 2019	10 May 2019	5	1	2	2	5	4	+1	20.00	
Career total			47	20	15	12	68	52	+16	42.55	—

== Honours ==
Walsall

- Football League Third Division runner-up: 1994–95

Birmingham City

- Football League Cup runner-up: 2000–01

Individual

- PFA Team of the Year: 1994–95 Third Division, 1995–96 Second Division
