= Dele Adebola =

English footballer (born 1975)

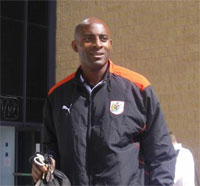
- Adebola pictured in 2008 while at Bristol City

Personal information
- Full name: Bamberdele Olusegun Adebola
- Date of birth: 23 June 1975 (age 51)
- Place of birth: Lagos, Nigeria
- Height: 6 ft 3 in (1.91 m)
- Position: Striker

Youth career
- ?–1992: Crewe Alexandra

Senior career*
Years	Team	Apps	(Gls)
1992–1998	Crewe Alexandra	123	(39)
1993–1994	→ Bangor City (loan)	4	(2)
1994	→ Northwich Victoria (loan)	16	(7)
1998–2002	Birmingham City	129	(31)
2002	→ Oldham Athletic (loan)	5	(0)
2002–2003	Crystal Palace	39	(5)
2003–2008	Coventry City	163	(31)
2004	→ Burnley (loan)	3	(1)
2004	→ Bradford City (loan)	15	(3)
2008–2009	Bristol City	56	(16)
2009–2011	Nottingham Forest	62	(5)
2011–2012	Hull City	10	(0)
2012	→ Notts County (loan)	6	(1)
2012–2013	Rochdale	26	(6)
2013	→ Wrexham (loan)	13	(2)
2013	Rushall Olympic		
- * Club domestic league appearances and goals

Bamberdele Olusegun Adebola (born 23 June 1975) is a Nigerian retired footballer. Including loans, he has played for 16 clubs in his career, with his longest spells at Crewe Alexandra, Birmingham City and Coventry City.

== Early life ==
Born in Lagos, Lagos State, Adebola was brought up in Liverpool after arriving in England as a baby with his family; as a schoolboy, he played in the same representative sides as Robbie Fowler. When offered a YTS place by Liverpool, the team he supported, he believed that trying to progress as a fellow left-footed striker at the club at the same time as Fowler would not be a good idea. Consequently, he accepted a similar offer from Crewe Alexandra.

== Club career ==
=== Crewe Alexandra ===
He made his first team debut in the 1992–93 season in the Third Division at the age of 17, and in the following season gained experience by playing on loan at Bangor City in the Welsh Premier League and Conference side Northwich Victoria. He made a significant impact for Crewe in 1996–97, his 16 goals proving crucial in the club's promotion to the First Division.

He soon proved himself capable of scoring goals at that level, and attracted interest from several bigger clubs. Disappointed when Crewe rejected an offer for him from West Ham United, he made it clear to the club that he wanted to leave, and reluctantly the club made him available for transfer. In February 1998, Adebola was signed by manager Trevor Francis for fellow First Division club Birmingham City for a fee of £1 million.

=== Birmingham City ===
With seven goals in the remainder of that season, and scoring in each of his first five matches (in all competitions) in 1998–99, his future at Birmingham looked bright. In his first full season he scored 13 goals, but in 1999–2000 he was less productive, fell out of favour, and at the end of the season was put on the transfer list. Las Palmas, newly promoted to La Liga, announced that they had signed him, only for the move to fall through on medical grounds.

Though remaining on the transfer list, he was restored to the first team, and his goals helped Birmingham to reach the 2001 Football League Cup Final. The manager said he kept him on the transfer list in order to provoke him into the sort of performance commensurate with his power, pace and technical ability but which his "laid-back" character might otherwise inhibit.

A serious knee injury, sustained later that season when the player slid into a goalpost, effectively marked the end of his Birmingham career. A spell on loan at Oldham Athletic towards the end of the 2001–02 season helped him back to fitness, but new manager Steve Bruce chose not to renew his contract.

=== Crystal Palace ===
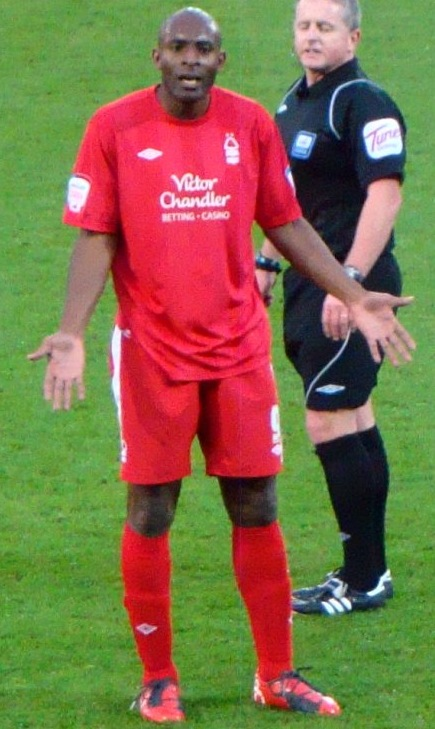
Adebola playing for Nottingham Forest in November 2010

In August 2002, Adebola signed a one-year contract with Crystal Palace, after impressing former manager Trevor Francis in a trial. He played one season at the club, where he proved his fitness, making 48 appearances in all competitions.

=== Coventry City ===
Again released at the end of that season, Gary McAllister took him to Coventry City, where he initially failed to find any form, finishing the season out on loan to Burnley, ironically a club that had been keen to buy him before his injury. At Burnley he scored once in three appearances, his goal coming against Watford.

Another loan spell followed, this time at Bradford City for whom he scored three goals. It was only when recalled to the Coventry side on a regular basis in 2004–05, first under Peter Reid and particularly under Micky Adams, playing with the likes of Stern John and Gary McSheffrey, that his form picked up.

=== Bristol City ===
On 30 January 2008, Adebola signed an 18-month contract with Bristol City, moving for an undisclosed fee, despite Coventry wanting to renew his deal, which was due to end in the summer. Adebola made his debut on 2 February in a 3–0 defeat away to Queens Park Rangers, and scored in just seven minutes on his home debut to help City defeat Sheffield Wednesday 2–1. His performances in the 2008–09 season, during which he scored 10 goals from 42 appearances, earned him the club's Player of the Year award. The player rejected the club's offer of a year's extension to his contract, claiming he had been offered a two-year deal elsewhere.

=== Nottingham Forest ===
It was announced on 30 June 2009 that Adebola had signed a two-year contract with Nottingham Forest. He joined them on a free transfer after rejecting a one-year deal at Bristol City. Adebola struggled to hold down a regular place in the Forest side in the 2009–10 season. He was mainly restricted to substitute appearances, finding himself below Dexter Blackstock and Robert Earnshaw in the pecking order, but he did manage to force his way into the Forest team, particularly away from home, towards the end of the season. He scored a late consolation goal for Forest in the play-off semi-final second leg against Blackpool.

=== Hull City ===
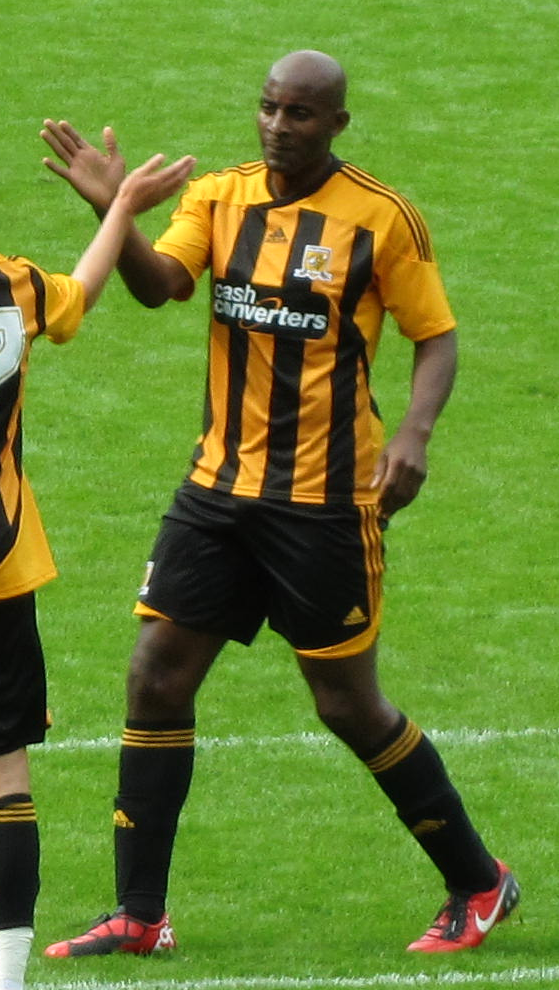
Adebola playing for Hull City in 2011

He entered contract negotiations with Hull City at the end of the 2010–11 season. On 29 June it was confirmed that Adebola signed a one-year contract. He made his debut in the first game of the season on 5 August 2011 at the KC Stadium in the 1–0 defeat to Blackpool. On 20 March 2012, Adebola joined League One club Notts County on loan for the remainder of the season. He made six league appearances and scored once, an 89th-minute equaliser in a 4–3 win away at Wycombe Wanderers.

=== Rochdale ===
On 7 August 2012, Adebola signed a one-year deal with League Two club Rochdale. Under manager John Coleman, Adebola made 26 league appearances for Rochdale, but when Keith Hill took over as manager after the sacking of Coleman, Hill made it clear he wanted to let Adebola leave the club.

=== Wrexham (loan) ===
In February 2013, Adebola signed on loan for Conference leaders Wrexham, subject to international clearance. On 2 March, he made his debut in a 1–1 draw in a Conference match at The Racecourse against Alfreton Town. Adebola made 13 appearances for Wrexham, scoring twice, against Lincoln City and Ebbsfleet United. His last appearance for Wrexham was as an 88th-minute substitute, replacing Jay Harris, at Wembley Stadium in the Conference play-off final against Newport County. Wrexham lost 2–0, condemning them to a sixth season in non-league football. On his return to Rochdale, he was released.

=== Rushall Olympic ===
Adebola signed for non-league Rushall Olympic in August 2013.

=== Leamington Veterans ===
As of 2024, Adebola plays for local side Leamington Veterans, alongside his fellow former Coventry player David Busst.

== International career ==
In March 1998 new Northern Ireland manager Lawrie McMenemy, on discovering Adebola to be a British citizen born abroad and therefore eligible to play for any of the home countries, selected him for his first match in charge, a friendly against Slovakia. Adebola had to withdraw due to injury, but did express an interest in playing for the country. He was also selected in Nigeria's provisional squad for the 1998 World Cup, but failed to make the cut.

Both Northern Ireland and Nigeria continued their pursuit of the player; in October 1998 McMenemy reported that Adebola was unwilling to play for Nigeria, and did not want to commit to Northern Ireland because he had his sights set on playing for England. In March 1999, McMenemy made a final abortive attempt to persuade him to play for Northern Ireland. Despite his lack of form at club level, he was still sufficiently highly rated by the Nigerian selectors to be included in the preliminary squad for the 2000 African Cup of Nations and, following talks with coach Jo Bonfrere, in the squad for a World Cup qualifier in July 2000. However, he did not accept any of these invitations.

== Career statistics ==
As of match played 29 November 2011.

Club performance			League		Cup		League Cup		Total	
Season	Club	League	Apps	Goals	Apps	Goals	Apps	Goals	Apps	Goals
England			League		FA Cup		League Cup		Total	
1994–95	Crewe Alexandra	Second Division	30	8	0	0	0	0	30	8
1995–96	Crewe Alexandra	Second Division	30	8	5	2	1	1	36	11
1996–97	Crewe Alexandra	Second Division	35	16	3	1	1	1	39	18
1997–98	Crewe Alexandra	First Division	27	7	1	0	1	0	29	7
1997–98	Birmingham City	First Division	17	7	0	0	0	0	17	7
1998–99	Birmingham City	First Division	41	14	1	1	4	2	46	17
1999–2000	Birmingham City	First Division	43	5	1	0	5	1	49	6
2000–01	Birmingham City	First Division	31	6	1	1	8	5	40	12
2001–02	Oldham Athletic (loan)	Second Division	5	0	0	0	0	0	5	0
2002–03	Crystal Palace	First Division	39	5	4	0	5	2	48	7
2003–04	Coventry City	First Division	28	2	3	0	2	1	33	3
2003–04	Burnley (loan)	First Division	3	1	0	0	0	0	3	1
2004–05	Bradford City (loan)	Championship	15	3	0	0	0	0	15	3
2004–05	Coventry City	Championship	25	5	1	1	0	0	26	6
2005–06	Coventry City	Championship	44	12	3	0	2	0	49	12
2006–07	Coventry City	Championship	40	8	2	0	1	1	43	9
2007–08	Coventry City	Championship	26	4	2	1	3	1	31	6
2007–08	Bristol City	Championship	20	6	0	0	0	0	20	6
2008–09	Bristol City	Championship	39	10	2	0	1	0	42	10
2009–10	Nottingham Forest	Championship	34	4	2	0	2	0	38	4
2010–11	Nottingham Forest	Championship	29	2	2	1	1	0	32	3
2011–12	Hull City	Championship	10	0	0	0	0	0	10	0
Total	England		611	133	33	8	37	15	681	156
Career total			611	133	33	8	37	15	681	156

== Honours ==
Crewe Alexandra

- Football League Second Division play-offs: 1997

Birmingham City

- Football League Cup runner-up: 2000–01
