= James Dyson (footballer) =

English footballer

Personal information
- Full name: James Gareth Dyson
- Date of birth: 20 April 1979 (age 47)
- Place of birth: Wordsley, England
- Height: 6 ft 2 in (1.88 m)
- Position: Midfielder

Youth career
- Birmingham City

Senior career*
Years	Team	Apps	(Gls)
1997–2001	Birmingham City	2	(0)
2001–2002	Hednesford Town		
2002–2003	Bromsgrove Rovers		
2006–	Stourbridge		
- * Club domestic league appearances and goals

James Gareth Dyson (born 20 April 1979) is an English former professional footballer who played for Birmingham City in the Football League. He played as a midfielder.

== Football career ==
Born in Wordsley, Staffordshire, Dyson began his football career in the youth system at Birmingham City. In August 1999 he made his first-team debut in the League Cup away at Exeter City, and on 17 December he made his Football League debut, as a half-time substitute, replacing Darren Purse in the Division One match against Wolverhampton Wanderers which Birmingham lost 2–1. A few days later he made another appearance off the bench. Dyson broke his leg in a training-ground collision with Purse in 1999, a setback which eventually led to his release at the end of the 2000–01 season.

Dyson had a trial at AFC Bournemouth in July 2001, which proved unsuccessful. He joined Hednesford Town of the Southern League Premier Division in November 2001, and scored from the penalty spot on his debut, but was released in February 2002 after failing to achieve regular first-team football.

He joined Bromsgrove of the Southern League Western Division in August 2002, and again scored on debut, but after 16 months with the club, he suffered a broken left tibia and fibula as the result of a 50–50 tackle. His manager described him as "a very popular boy and a very important player for us. He's an exceptional footballer and brings a thoughtfulness with everything he tries to do", but suggested that after twice breaking his leg he might be wise to consider his future in the game.

Dyson resumed his competitive football career nearly three years later, when he joined Stourbridge of the Southern League Midlands Division in October 2006. He played 14 games in all competitions in his first season with the club, and appeared in the playoff final against Leamington through which they won promotion to the Premier Division. In 2009, Dyson was part of the Stourbridge team that lost to former club Hednesford in the final of the Birmingham Senior Cup, and helped the club defeat Football League club Plymouth Argyle to reach the second round proper of the 2011–12 FA Cup.
