= Steve Robinson (English footballer) =

English footballer

Personal information
- Full name: Steven Eli Robinson
- Date of birth: 17 January 1975 (age 51)
- Place of birth: Nottingham, England
- Height: 5 ft 8 in (1.73 m)
- Position: Midfielder

Senior career*
| Years | Team | Apps | (Gls) |
| 1993–2001 | Birmingham City | 81 | (0) |
| 1995 | → Kidderminster Harriers (loan) | | |
| 1996 | → Peterborough United (loan) | 5 | (0) |
| 2001–2005 | Swindon Town | 161 | (5) |
| 2005–2006 | Lincoln City | 12 | (0) |
| 2005–2006 | → Worksop Town (loan) | | |
| 2006–2009 | Worksop Town | | |
| 2008–2009 | → Grantham Town (loan) | 4 | (0) |
- * Club domestic league appearances and goals

Steven Eli Robinson (born 17 January 1975) is an English professional footballer who plays as a defensive midfielder or right wing back. He spent most of his career at Birmingham City and Swindon Town.

== Career ==
Robinson began his career as a trainee at Birmingham City in 1991, and turned professional two years later. He made his debut on 4 March 1995, as a substitute in a goalless draw at Hull City in the Second Division. He remained with Birmingham until February 2001, in which time he made 95 appearances in all competitions, and also had loan spells with Kidderminster Harriers and Peterborough United in the 1995–96 season. After appearing in only four league matches in the 2000–01 season, he joined Swindon Town for a fee in the region of £50,000.

His arrival at Swindon coincided with a run of just one defeat in nine games, which ultimately helped save the club from relegation. Robinson made himself a hit almost immediately with the Swindon supporters, by scoring two spectacular volleys in a local derby against bitter rivals Oxford United which Swindon won 2–0. Robinson did not score again for another 22 months: his next goal came in a 5–2 win at Stockport County in January 2003. A broken fibula sustained in a 2–2 draw at Blackpool in late January 2004 ruled him out of the remainder of the 2003–04 season. At the end of the season, Robinson was offered and signed a new one-year contract with Swindon. However, he started only 11 more league games for the club, and he was not offered a new contract when the 2004–05 season ended.

Robinson joined League Two side Lincoln City on a one-year contract in July 2005, but a foot injury sustained in pre-season meant he did not appear in the first team until late September, and he made no further appearances before joining Worksop Town on loan in November 2005. Robinson returned to make another 11 appearances for Lincoln before being released in May 2006, and rejoining Worksop Town.

In November 2008, he joined Grantham Town on a three-month loan deal. However, injuries restricted him to just four appearances for the club, before he returned to Worksop at the end of the loan spell and was released at the end of the 2008–09 season.
