= Trésor Luntala =

Congolese footballer

Personal information
- Full name: Trésor Luntala
- Date of birth: 31 May 1982 (age 44)
- Place of birth: Kinshasa, Zaire
- Height: 1.75 m (5 ft 9 in)
- Position: Midfielder

Youth career
- 1998–1999: Rennes
- 1999–2001: Birmingham City

Senior career*
Years	Team	Apps	(Gls)
2001–2002	Birmingham City	15	(0)
2002–2003	Guingamp		
2003–2004	Grasshoppers		
2004–2005	Visé	10	(0)
2005–2006	La Louvière	22	(0)
2006–2007	Asteras Tripolis	5	(0)
2007–2009	Ethnikos Asteras	70	(0)
2012–2021	Alençon		

International career
2003–2008	DR Congo	6	(0)
- * Club domestic league appearances and goals

Trésor Luntala (born 31 May 1982) is a Congolese former professional footballer who played as a midfielder. From 2003 to 2008, he played for the DR Congo national team.

== Club career ==
Clubs in Luntala's early career included Rennes, Birmingham City, Grasshoppers and Visé. In January 2007, he signed a contract with Ethnikos Asteras in Greece.

In December 2021, Luntala announced his retirement from his playing career following a job offer in the youth academy of his former club Rennes.

== International career ==
He was part of the Congolese 2004 African Cup of Nations team, who finished bottom of their group in the first round of competition, thus failing to secure qualification for the quarter-finals.
