= Martin Grainger =

English footballer

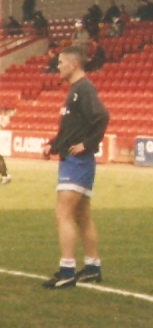
- Grainger warming up at the Bescot Stadium in 1996

Personal information
- Full name: Martin Robert Grainger
- Date of birth: 23 August 1972 (age 54)
- Place of birth: Enfield, England
- Height: 5 ft 10 in (1.78 m)
- Position: Defender

Youth career
- –1989: Colchester United

Senior career*
Years	Team	Apps	(Gls)
1992	Wivenhoe Town - loan	6	(0)
1989–1993	Colchester United	62	(7)
1993–1996	Brentford	101	(12)
1996–2005	Birmingham City	226	(25)
2004	→ Coventry City (loan)	7	(0)
Total		396	(44)

Managerial career
- 2008: Cheshunt
- * Club domestic league appearances and goals

Martin Grainger (born 23 August 1972) is an English former professional footballer who played as a defender. He made 380 appearances and scored 44 goals in the Football League and Premier League. He was an attacking left back who could also play further up the field or even as a winger and was a dead ball specialist.

== Playing career ==
An experienced player, his career started in 1989 at Colchester United, where he made 37 league starts between July 1992 and October 1993, before moving on to Brentford on 21 October for a fee of £60,000. He was a first-team regular throughout his time at the club, making 100 league starts and scoring 12 goals. He joined Birmingham City on 25 March 1996, and quickly became an inspirational player due to his continued consistency and ability from set-pieces.

He picked up the Player of the Season award for 1999–2000, and played for Birmingham in the 2001 Football League Cup Final loss to Liverpool, missing one of the spot kicks in the shootout. As Birmingham continued to improve in the First Division, and eventually earned promotion into the Premiership, Grainger's playing time became limited. He failed to appear for Birmingham due to injury during the first half of the 2003–04 season, and in February he was loaned to Coventry City, for whom he made seven league appearances. On 18 March 2004, he was recalled to Birmingham's team due to an injury crisis, and got on the scoresheet in a 2–1 defeat to Manchester United, but was himself injured and failed to appear in any matches for the rest of the season.

Grainger retired from football on 1 January 2005, having spent 13 years as a player. His goal-scoring appearance against Manchester United, on 10 April 2004, proved to be his final professional fixture. In the years following his retirement, Grainger has continued to be a popular figure amongst supporters of Birmingham City.

== Managerial career ==
In January 2008, Grainger was appointed manager of Southern League Premier Division club Cheshunt, but left the post after less than a week. In their only game during his tenure, Cheshunt lost 4–0 to Hemel Hempstead Town.

== Personal life ==
After leaving professional football, Grainger worked in many jobs, and in 2015 was training to be a train driver.

In 1995, Martin married Nicola in Forty Hill, Enfield. They had two sons, Charlie and Sonnie. Charlie became a professional footballer, playing as a goalkeeper. He joined Leyton Orient in 2009, turned professional in 2014, and has represented England at under-18 level.

== Honours ==
Colchester United

- Football Conference: 1991–92

Birmingham City

- Football League First Division play-offs: 2002
- Football League Cup runner-up: 2000–01
- Birmingham Senior Cup: 1995–96

Individual

- PFA Team of the Year: 2000–01 First Division
