= Darren Horrigan =

English footballer (born 1983)

Personal information
- Full name: Darren Horrigan
- Date of birth: 2 June 1983 (age 43)
- Place of birth: Middlesbrough, England
- Height: 6 ft 3 in (1.91 m)
- Position: Goalkeeper

Youth career
- Birmingham City

Senior career*
Years	Team	Apps	(Gls)
–2001	Birmingham City	0	(0)
2001–2004	Lincoln City	1	(0)
2002	→ Stamford Town (loan)		
2003	→ Cambridge City (loan)	1	(0)
2003	→ Ilkeston Town (loan)		
2004	Spennymoor United		
2004	Scarborough	1	(0)
2004–2005	Spennymoor United		
2005	Gateshead	7	(0)
2005	Bishop Auckland	11	(0)
2005–200?	Tow Law Town		
- * Club domestic league appearances and goals as of January 2006

Darren Horrigan (born 2 June 1983) is an English footballer who played in the Football League for Lincoln City. A goalkeeper born in Middlesbrough, Horrigan began his career with Birmingham City, and went on to play non-League football for clubs including Stamford Town, Cambridge City, Ilkeston Town, Spennymoor United, Scarborough, Gateshead, Bishop Auckland and Tow Law Town.
