= Jimmy Haarhoff =

Zambian footballer (born 1981)

Personal information
- Full name: James Phiri Haarhoff
- Date of birth: 27 May 1981 (age 45)
- Place of birth: Lusaka, Zambia
- Positions: Midfielder; forward

Youth career
- Maypole Juniors
- 19??–1997: Birmingham City

Senior career*
Years	Team	Apps	(Gls)
1997–2001	Birmingham City	1	(0)
2001–2002	Chester City	33	(2)
2002	→ Droylsden (loan)		
2002–2003	Droylsden		
2003–2004	Moor Green		
2004–200?	Halesowen Town		

International career
2000	Northern Ireland U18	2	(0)
- * Club domestic league appearances and goals

James Phiri Haarhoff (born 27 May 1981) is a retired professional footballer who played in the Football League for Birmingham City. He played international football for Northern Ireland at under-18 level.

== Career ==
Haarhoff was born in Lusaka, Zambia. As a youngster, he played football for Maypole Juniors in the Yardley Wood district of Birmingham, England, before joining the youth system of professional club Birmingham City. He made his first-team debut – and his only first-team appearance – as a last-minute substitute in the Division One (second tier) match at home to Crystal Palace on 16 October 1999.

As the holder of a British passport born outside the United Kingdom, Haarhoff was eligible to play international football for any of the Home Nations. He made his debut for Northern Ireland at under-18 level as a half-time substitute in a 3–1 defeat of their Denmark counterparts in a friendly international in February 2000. According to manager Roy Millar, "He has quick feet and is very pacey. He goes past players and is exciting to watch", and his debut performance earned him a place in the starting eleven, also against Denmark, a couple of days later.

After trials with Doncaster Rovers and Chester City in December 2000, Haarhoff signed a short-term deal with the latter club in January 2001 after Birmingham released him from his contract. He began well, but failed to make the starting eleven in the latter part of the season. With his contract due to expire, Haarhoff was one of several players called in by the chairman for two weeks' fitness training; those who failed to attend, Haarhoff included, were threatened with dismissal, but a few days later he was offered and accepted a two-year contract. In October 2001, after a change of ownership and management at the club, Haarhoff was offered a loan move to Droylsden of the Northern Premier League, which he turned down. In February 2002 he had been playing for the reserve team, but returned to the first team as a substitute to score a last-minute winner to knock Hereford United out and reach the quarter-final of the FA Trophy. He was given a squad number prior to the 2002–03 season, but in August 2002 he joined Droylsden on a three-month loan, a move which was made permanent five weeks later.

Haarhoff signed for Southern League Premier side Moor Green in the 2003 close season, but failed to settle, and dropped down a division to fellow Halesowen Town in March 2004. He played eight games in what remained of the 2003–04 season, contributing to the club's promotion to the Premier Division, and 44 games in all competitions in 2004–05, of which 31 were in the league. At the end of the season he was not offered a new contract, and opted to give up the pursuit of a career as a footballer in favour of his religion. In June 2005 he was baptised into the Seventh-day Adventist Church, in which his father Jim was an elder.

Since his retirement as a player, Haarhoff has worked with Halesowen Town's and Birmingham City's community programmes, and as a skills coach in the Birmingham area under the Football Association's Skills Coaches programme. He went on to set up his own coaching company.
