= 2000–01 Football League Cup =

Worthington Cup, League Cup

Tournament details
- Country: England; Wales
- Teams: 92

Final positions
- Champions: Liverpool (6th title)
- Runners-up: Birmingham City

Tournament statistics
- Top goal scorer(s): Robbie Fowler (6 goals)

The 2000–01 Football League Cup (known as the Worthington Cup for sponsorship reasons) was the 41st staging of the Football League Cup, a knockout competition for England's top 92 football clubs.

The competition began on 22 August 2000, and ended with the final on 25 February 2001 at the Millennium Stadium in Cardiff as Wembley Stadium had been closed for a rebuild.

The tournament was won by Liverpool, who beat Birmingham City 5–4 on penalties after a 1–1 draw after extra-time. Robbie Fowler put Liverpool in front after half an hour but a Darren Purse penalty salvaged the game for Birmingham in the final minute of normal time.

This edition was the last with two-legged ties in the first two rounds.

== First round ==
The 70 First, Second and Third Division clubs compete from the first round. Each section is divided equally into a pot of seeded clubs and a pot of unseeded clubs. Clubs' rankings depend upon their finishing position in the 1999–2000 season. Therefore, the 20th place from the Premier League in 2000, Watford was the top seed, and the club newly promoted to the Third Division, Kidderminster Harriers, were bottom seeds. The first legs took place on 22 and 23 August and the second legs on 5 and 6 September.

Tie no	Home team	(1st Leg) (2nd Leg) Aggregate	Away team
1	Crystal Palace	(2–1) (0–0); 2–1	Cardiff City
2	Colchester United	(0–1) (4–1); 4–2	Q.P.R.
3	Plymouth Argyle	(1–2) (1–1); 2–3	Bristol Rovers
4	Barnet	(2–1) (1–3); 3–4	Wycombe Wanderers
5	Bolton Wanderers	(1–0) (1–3); 2–3	Macclesfield Town
6	Brighton	(1–2) (1–1); 2–3	Millwall
7	Bristol City	(2–2) (1–2); 3–4	Brentford
8	Burnley	(4–1) (2–3); 6–4	Hartlepool United
9	Cambridge United	(0–0) (0–1); 0–1	Portsmouth
10	Crewe Alexandra	(2–2) (2–1); 4–3	Bury
11	Darlington	(2–2) (2–1); 4–3	Nottingham Forest
12	Gillingham	(2–0) (2–3); 4–3	Torquay United
13	Grimsby Town	(2–0) (1–1); 3–1	Carlisle United
14	Hull City	(1–0) (0–2); 1–2	Notts County
15	Leyton Orient	(1–1) (2–0); 3–1	Reading
16	Luton Town	(0–0) (2–2); 2–2	Peterborough United
Luton Town win on away goals
17	Mansfield Town	(0–1) (3–0); 3–1	Wrexham
18	Northampton Town	(1–0) (1–4); 2–4	Fulham
19	Norwich City	(0–0) (2–1); 2–1	A.F.C. Bournemouth
20	Oldham Athletic	(1–0) (2–0); 3–0	Huddersfield Town
21	Port Vale	(1–2) (2–2); 3–4	Chesterfield
22	Rochdale	(1–1) (1–6); 2–7	Blackburn Rovers
23	Rotherham United	(0–1) (2–3); 2–4	Barnsley
24	Sheffield United	(6–1) (0–1); 6–2	Lincoln City
25	Shrewsbury Town	(1–0) (1–4); 2–4	Preston North End
26	Southend United	(0–5) (0–0); 0–5	Birmingham City
27	Stockport County	(0–1) (2–3); 2–4	Blackpool
28	Swansea City	(0–0) (1–2); 1–2	West Bromwich Albion
29	Swindon Town	(1–1) (2–1); 3–2	Exeter City
30	Tranmere Rovers	(3–0) (2–1); 5–1	Halifax Town
31	Walsall	(1–1) (1–0); 2–1	Kidderminster Harriers
32	Watford	(0–0) (3–0); 3–0	Cheltenham Town
33	Wigan Athletic	(1–0) (4–1); 5–1	Scunthorpe United
34	Wolverhampton Wanderers	(0–1) (3–1); 3–2	Oxford United
35	York City	(1–5) (0–0); 1–5	Stoke City

== Second round ==
The 35 winners from the first round joined the Premier League clubs not participating in European competition along with Wimbledon and Sheffield Wednesday, the top two relegated teams from Premier League the last season. The ties were played over two legs, with the first legs from 19 to 20 September and the second legs on 26 and 27 September. Two second leg matches were played on 2 October.

Tie no	Home team	(1st Leg) (2nd Leg) Aggregate	Away team
1	Grimsby Town	(3–2) (0–2); 3–4	Wolverhampton Wanderers
2	Everton	(1–1) (1–1); 2–2	Bristol Rovers
After extra time – Bristol Rovers win 4 – 2 on penalties
3	Manchester City	(1–1) (4–2); 5–3	Gillingham
4	Newcastle United	(2–0) (1–1); 3–1	Leyton Orient
5	Southampton	(2–1) (3–1); 5–2	Mansfield Town
6	Stoke City	(2–1) (3–4); 5–5	Charlton Athletic
Stoke City win on away goals
7	Barnsley	(4–0) (3–0); 7–0	Crewe Alexandra
8	Blackburn Rovers	(4–0) (1–1); 5–1	Portsmouth
9	Brentford	(0–0) (0–2); 0–2	Tottenham Hotspur
10	Burnley	(2–2) (1–1); 3–3	Crystal Palace
Crystal Palace win on away goals
11	Chesterfield	(1–0) (0–4); 1–4	Fulham
12	Darlington	(0–1) (2–7); 2–8	Bradford City
13	Derby County	(1–2) (4–2); 5–4	West Bromwich Albion
14	Wimbledon	(0–0) (2–1); 2–1	Wigan Athletic
15	Middlesbrough	(2–1) (3–1); 5–2	Macclesfield Town
16	Millwall	(2–0) (0–5); 2–5	Ipswich Town
17	Norwich City	(3–3) (5–0); 8–3	Blackpool
18	Notts County	(1–3) (2–0); 3–3	Watford
Watford win on away goals
19	Oldham Athletic	(1–3) (1–5); 2–8	Sheffield Wednesday
20	Preston North End	(1–3) (1–4); 2–7	Coventry City
21	Sheffield United	(3–0) (1–0); 4–0	Colchester United
22	Sunderland	(3–0) (2–1); 5–1	Luton Town
23	Tranmere Rovers	(1–1) (1–0); 2–1	Swindon Town
24	Walsall	(0–1) (1–1); 1–2	West Ham United
25	Wycombe Wanderers	(3–4) (0–1); 3–5	Birmingham City

== Third round ==
The 25 winners from the second round joined the Premier League clubs participating in European competition in round three. Matches were played on 31 October and 1 November.

Tie no	Home team	Score	Away team	Date
1	Arsenal	1–2	Ipswich Town	1 November 2000
2	Aston Villa	0–1	Manchester City	1 November 2000
3	Derby County	3–0	Norwich City	1 November 2000
4	Fulham	3–2	Wolverhampton Wanderers	1 November 2000
5	Leicester City	0–3	Crystal Palace	1 November 2000
6	Liverpool	1–1	Chelsea	1 November 2000
Liverpool win 2–1 after extra time
7	Newcastle United	4–3	Bradford City	1 November 2000
8	Sheffield Wednesday	1–1	Sheffield United	1 November 2000
Sheffield Wednesday win 2–1 after extra time
9	Southampton	0–1	Coventry City	1 November 2000
10	Stoke City	3–2	Barnsley	1 November 2000
11	Bristol Rovers	1–2	Sunderland	31 October 2000
12	Wimbledon	1–0	Middlesbrough	31 October 2000
13	Tottenham Hotspur	1–3	Birmingham City	31 October 2000
14	Tranmere Rovers	3–2	Leeds United	31 October 2000
15	Watford	0–3	Manchester United	31 October 2000
16	West Ham United	2–0	Blackburn Rovers	31 October 2000

== Fourth round ==
The eight matches were played on 28 and 29 November.

29 November 2000

Birmingham City	2–1	Newcastle United
Adebola 31'; Johnson 90'		Dyer 14'

St Andrew's, Birmingham
Attendance: 18,520
Referee: Steve Bennett
29 November 2000

Fulham	3–2	Derby County
Saha 28', 90'; Lewis 39'		Christie 13'; Powell 45'

Craven Cottage, London
Attendance: 11,761
Referee: Peter Jones
29 November 2000

Manchester City	2–1	Wimbledon
Wanchope 26'; Goater 81'		Roberts 11'

Maine Road, Manchester
Attendance: 19,513
Referee: Bill Jordan
29 November 2000

Stoke City	0–8	Liverpool
		Ziege 6'; Šmicer 26'; Babbel 28'; Fowler 26', 82', 85' (pen.); Hyypiä 59'; Murphy 65'

Britannia Stadium, Stoke
Attendance: 27,109
Referee: Andy D'Urso
29 November 2000

West Ham United	1–2	Sheffield Wednesday
Lampard 72'		Morrison 30'; Westwood 49'

Boleyn Ground, London
Attendance: 20,853
Referee: Paul Danson
28 November 2000

Crystal Palace	0–0 (a.e.t.)	Tranmere Rovers
Penalties
	6–5

Selhurst Park, London
Attendance: 10,271
Referee: David Laws
28 November 2000

Ipswich Town	2–1	Coventry City
Bramble 5'; Johnson 65'		Bellamy 54' (pen.)

Portman Road, Ipswich
Attendance: 19,563
Referee: Paul Durkin
28 November 2000

Sunderland	2–1 (a.e.t.)	Manchester United
Arca 75'; Phillips 101' (pen.)		Yorke 31'

Stadium of Light, Sunderland
Attendance: 47,543
Referee: Mark Halsey

== Quarter-finals ==
The four matches were played on 12, 13 and 19 December.

19 December 2000

Crystal Palace	2–1	Sunderland
Forssell 48'; Morrison 82'		Rae 49'

Selhurst Park, London
Attendance: 15,945
Referee: Alan Wiley
19 December 2000

Manchester City	1–2 (a.e.t.)	Ipswich Town
Goater 10'		Holland 60'; Venus 109'

Maine Road, Manchester
Attendance: 31,252
Referee: Graham Poll
13 December 2000

Liverpool	3–0 (a.e.t.)	Fulham
Owen 105'; Šmicer 114'; Barmby 120'

Anfield, Liverpool
Attendance: 20,144
Referee: Dermot Gallagher
12 December 2000

Birmingham City	2–0	Sheffield Wednesday
Sonner 28'; Adebola 57'

St Andrew's, Birmingham
Attendance: 22,911
Referee: Jeff Winter

== Semi-finals ==
The semi-final draw was made in December 2000 after the conclusion of the quarter finals. Unlike the other rounds, the semi-final ties were played over two legs, with each team playing one leg at home. The first legs were played on 9 and 10 January and the second legs on 24 and 31 January 2001.

=== First leg ===
9 January 2001
19:45

Ipswich Town	1–0	Birmingham City
Stewart 45' (pen.)

Portman Road, Ipswich
Attendance: 21,684
Referee: Clive Wilkes (Gloucester)
10 January 2001
20:00

Crystal Palace	2–1	Liverpool
Rubins 56'; Morrison 77'	Report	Šmicer 78'

Selhurst Park, London
Attendance: 25,933
Referee: Uriah Rennie (Sheffield)

=== Second leg ===
24 January 2001
20:00

Liverpool	5–0	Crystal Palace
Šmicer 13'; Murphy 15', 51'; Bišćan 18'; Fowler 89'	Report

Anfield, Liverpool
Attendance: 41,854
Referee: Paul Durkin

Liverpool win 6–2 on aggregate.

31 January 2001
19:45

Birmingham City	4–1 (a.e.t.)	Ipswich Town
Horsfield 43', 55'; Grainger 103'; A. Johnson 116'		Scowcroft 56'

St Andrew's, Birmingham
Attendance: 28,624
Referee: Jeff Winter

Birmingham City win 4–2 on aggregate

== Final ==
The 2001 Worthington Cup Final was played on 25 February 2001 and was contested between First Division side Birmingham City and Premier League team Liverpool at the Millennium Stadium, Cardiff. Liverpool won the game 5–4 on penalties following a 1–1 draw after extra time.

25 February 2001
15:00

Birmingham City	1–1	Liverpool
Purse 90' (pen.)	Report	Fowler 30'

Millennium Stadium, Cardiff
Attendance: 73,500
Referee: David Elleray

Liverpool win 5–4 penalties
