= 1999–2000 Peterborough United F.C. season =

Peterborough United
1999–2000 season
- Football League Third Division (promoted via play-offs): 5th
- FA Cup: First round
- League Cup: First round
- Football League Trophy: Second Round
- Top goalscorer: Andy Clarke (18)
Home colours

During the 1999–2000 English football season, Peterborough United Football Club competed in the Football League Third Division where they finished in 5th position on 78 points and gained promotion to the Football League Second Division via the play-offs.

== Final league table ==
Pos	Team	Pld	W	D	L	GF	GA	GD	Pts	Promotion or relegation
3	Northampton Town (P)	46	25	7	14	63	45	+18	82	Promotion to the Second Division
4	Darlington	46	21	16	9	66	36	+30	79	Qualification for the Third Division play-offs
5	Peterborough United (O, P)	46	22	12	12	63	54	+9	78	Qualification for the Third Division play-offs
6	Barnet	46	21	12	13	59	53	+6	75	Qualification for the Third Division play-offs
7	Hartlepool United	46	21	9	16	60	49	+11	72	Qualification for the Third Division play-offs

Rules for classification: 1) Points; 2) Goal difference; 3) Goals scored
(O) Play-off winners; (P) Promoted

== Results ==
Peterborough United's score comes first

=== Legend ===
Win	Draw	Loss

=== Division Three ===
Match	Date	Opponent	Venue	Result	Attendance	Scorers
1	7 August 1999	Hartlepool United	H	2–1	5,886	Castle 34', Green 83'
2	14 August 1999	Northampton Town	A	1–0	6,253	Davies 66'
3	21 August 1999	Leyton Orient	H	2–1	6,448	Etherington 19', Castle 15'
4	28 August 1999	Plymouth Argyle	A	1–2	4,189	Farrell 90'
5	30 August 1999	Darlington	H	4–2	6,044	Shields 5', Martin 9', Farrell 17', Etherington 55'
6	3 September 1999	Mansfield Town	A	1–3	3,338	Castle 78' (pen)
7	11 September 1999	York City	A	0–0	2,832	
8	18 September 1999	Cheltenham Town	H	1–0	5,242	Castle 68'
9	25 September 1999	Southend United	A	1–0	6,187	Davies 37'
10	2 October 1999	Brighton & Hove Albion	H	0–0	7,823	
11	9 October 1999	Chester City	H	2–1	4,965	Forinton 9', 43'
12	16 October 1999	Halifax Town	A	1–2	3,292	Broughton 90'
13	19 October 1999	Torquay United	A	1–2	2,000	Etherington 19'
14	23 October 1999	Southend United	H	1–0	5,860	Chapple 85'
15	2 November 1999	Lincoln City	A	2–1	5,032	Forinton 38', 43'
16	6 November 1999	Shrewsbury Town	H	4–1	5,264	Clarke 7', 29', Castle 19', Forinton 24'
17	12 November 1999	Carlisle United	A	1–1	2,515	Forinton 34'
18	20 November 1999	Macclesfield Town	H	2–2	5,083	Clarke 19', Edwards 48'
19	27 November 1999	Barnet	H	1–2	8,631	Forinton 9'
20	4 December 1999	Hartlepool United	A	0–1	2,404	
21	26 December 1999	Rotherham United	H	0–5	10,793	
22	28 December 1999	Exeter City	A	2–2	2,695	Clarke 9', 81'
23	3 January 2000	Swansea City	H	2–3	6,439	Gill 2', Castle 45'
24	8 January 2000	Hull City	A	3–2	5,898	Clarke 68', 90', Scott 75'
25	15 January 2000	Northampton Town	H	1–0	9,104	Lee 72'
26	22 January 2000	Leyton Orient	A	1–1	4,795	Lee 19'
27	29 January 2000	Plymouth Argyle	H	2–0	5,694	Castle 82', Clarke 88'
28	6 February 2000	Darlington	A	0–2	4,688	
29	12 February 2000	Mansfield Town	H	1–0	5,472	Lee 42'
30	19 February 2000	Barnet	A	2–0	3,753	Castle 21', Lee 45'
31	22 February 2000	Hull City	H	2–1	6,668	Drury 54', Scott 88'
32	26 February 2000	Cheltenham Town	A	1–2	4,250	Clarke 72'
33	4 March 2000	York City	H	2–0	5,578	Clarke 40', Lee 80'
34	7 March 2000	Shrewsbury Town	A	1–0	2,018	Clarke 18'
35	11 March 2000	Lincoln City	H	2–2	7,882	Farrell 11', Clarke 14'
36	18 March 2000	Macclesfield Town	A	1–1	2,309	Scott 18'
37	21 March 2000	Carlisle United	H	0–2	5,178	
38	25 March 2000	Rotherham United	A	1–1	5,319	Cullen 42'
39	1 April 2000	Rochdale	H	3–3	5,587	Clarke 17', Rea 68', Lee 82'
40	8 April 2000	Swansea City	A	0–0	6,574	
41	15 April 2000	Exeter City	H	3–1	5,276	Clarke 2', Cullen 26', Edwards 32'
42	18 April 2000	Rochdale	A	2–1	2,816	Castle 8', 40'
43	22 April 2000	Halifax Town	H	2–1	7,194	Cullen 67', Clarke 70'
44	26 April 2000	Brighton & Hove Albion	A	0–0	5,813	
45	29 April 2000	Torquay United	A	0–2	8,242	
46	6 May 2000	Chester City	A	1–0	4,905	Hanlon 64'

=== Division Three play-offs ===
Round	Date	Opponent	Venue	Result	Attendance	Scorers
Semi final 1st Leg	13 May 2000	Barnet	A	2–1	4,535	Lee 5', Clarke 68'
Semi final 2nd Leg	17 May 2000	Barnet	H	3–0	10,515	Farrell 28', 70', 89'
Final	26 May 2000	Darlington	N	1–0	33,383	Clarke 74'

=== League Cup ===
Round	Date	Opponent	Venue	Result	Attendance	Scorers
R1 1st Leg	11 August 1999	Reading	A	0–0	4,651	
R1 2nd Leg	24 August 1999	Reading	H	1–2	4,109	Shields 20'

=== FA Cup ===
Round	Date	Opponent	Venue	Result	Attendance	Scorers
R1	30 October 1999	Brighton & Hove Albion	H	1–1	7,260	Clarke 24'
R1 Replay	9 November 1999	Brighton & Hove Albion	A	0–3	5,612	

=== Football League Trophy ===
Round	Date	Opponent	Venue	Result	Attendance	Scorers
R2	11 January 2000	Brentford	H	0–1	2,430	

== Squad ==
Note: Flags indicate national team as defined under FIFA eligibility rules; some limited exceptions apply. Players may hold more than one non-FIFA nationality.

No.	Pos.	Nation	Player
1	GK	(England) ENG	Mark Tyler
2	DF	(England) ENG	Dean Hooper
3	DF	(England) ENG	Adam Drury
4	DF	(England) ENG	Richard Scott
5	DF	(England) ENG	Matt Wicks
6	DF	(England) ENG	Andy Edwards
7	MF	(England) ENG	David Farrell
8	MF	(Wales) WAL	Simon Davies (sold to Tottenham)
8	DF	(England) ENG	Zat Knight (on loan from Fulham)
9	FW	(England) ENG	Andy Clarke
10	FW	(England) ENG	Drewe Broughton
11	MF	(England) ENG	Matthew Etherington (sold to Tottenham)
11	MF	(England) ENG	Jon Cullen
12	MF	(England) ENG	Matthew Gill
13	GK	(Netherlands) NED	Bart Griemink
14	FW	(England) ENG	Francis Green
15	DF	(England) ENG	Phil Chapple (club captain)
16	FW	(England) ENG	Matthew Hann
17	MF	(Republic of Ireland) IRL	Niall Inman
18	MF	(England) ENG	Ritchie Hanlon

No.	Pos.	Nation	Player
19	DF	(England) ENG	Gareth Jelleyman
20	MF	(Republic of Ireland) IRL	Tony Shields
22	MF	(England) ENG	Grant Haley
23	MF	(Iceland) ISL	Helgi Danielsson
24	MF	(England) ENG	Chris Cleaver
25	GK	(England) ENG	Andy Woodman (on loan from Brentford)
26	MF	(England) ENG	Daniel French
27	MF	(Denmark) DEN	Anders Koogi
28	DF	(Northern Ireland) NIR	Gerard Lyttle
29	FW	(England) ENG	Jae Martin
30	MF	(England) ENG	Steve Castle
31	GK	(Republic of Ireland) IRL	Dan Connor
32	FW	(Wales) WAL	Aaron Cable
34	DF	(England) ENG	Simon Rea
35	FW	(England) ENG	Howard Forinton
36	FW	(Cayman Islands) CAY	Jason Lee
37	GK	(England) ENG	Luke Steele
38	DF	(England) ENG	Dan Murray
39	MF	(England) ENG	Adam Tanner
40	MF	(Australia) AUS	David Oldfield

Appearances for competitive matches only

Pos.	Name	League		FA Cup		League Cup		Other		Total	
Pos.	Name	Apps	Goals	Apps	Goals	Apps	Goals	Apps	Goals	Apps	Goals
FW	(England) Drewe Broughton	5(5)	1	0	0	2	0	0	0	7(5)	1
MF	(England) Steve Castle	36(3)	10	1	0	2	0	3	0	42(3)	10
DF	(England) Phil Chapple	15(1)	1	1	0	0	0	1	0	17(1)	1
FW	(England) Andy Clarke	33(4)	15	2	1	0	0	4	2	40(4)	18
GK	(Republic of Ireland) Dan Connor	0(1)	0	0	0	0	0	0	0	0(1)	0
MF	(England) Jon Cullen	12	3	0	0	0	0	1	0	13(3)	3
MF	(Wales) Simon Davies	16	2	2	0	2	0	0	0	20	2
DF	(England) Adam Drury	41(1)	1	2	0	2	0	4	0	49(1)	1
DF	(England) Andy Edwards	44	2	2	0	2	0	4	0	52	2
MF	(England) Matthew Etherington	19	3	2	0	1	0	0	0	22	3
MF	(England) David Farrell	33(2)	3	0	0	2	0	3	3	38(2)	6
FW	(England) Howard Forinton	19(6)	7	2	0	0	0	0	0	21(6)	7
MF	(England) Daniel French	0(6)	0	0(1)	0	0	0	0	0	0(7)	0
MF	(England) Matthew Gill	7(13)	1	0	0	0	0	1(2)	0	8(15)	1
FW	(England) Francis Green	8(12)	1	1	0	0(1)	0	1(2)	0	10(14)	1
GK	(Netherlands) Bart Griemink	14(1)	0	0	0	0	0	0	0	14(1)	0
DF	(England) Grant Haley	1	0	0	0	0	0	0	0	1	0
MF	(England) Ritchie Hanlon	9(7)	1	0	0	0	0	1(2)	0	10(9)	1
DF	(England) Dean Hooper	28(1)	0	2	0	2	0	1(1)	0	33(2)	0
MF	(Republic of Ireland) Niall Inman	0(1)	0	0	0	0	0	0(1)	0	0(2)	0
MF	(Wales) Gareth Jelleyman	14(6)	0	0	0	0	0	3(1)	0	17(7)	0
DF	(England) Zat Knight	8	0	0	0	0	0	0	0	8	0
DF	(Denmark) Anders Koogi	0(1)	0	0	0	0	0	0	0	0(1)	0
FW	(England) Jason Lee	23	6	0	0	0	0	2	1	25	6
FW	(England) Jae Martin	7(7)	1	0	0	1(1)	0	1	0	9(8)	1
DF	(England) Dan Murray	2	0	0	0	0	0	0	0	2	0
MF	(Australia) David Oldfield	9	0	0	0	0	0	3	0	12	0
DF	(England) Simon Rea	11(3)	1	0	0	0(1)	0	2(1)	0	13(4)	1
DF	(England) Richard Scott	28(6)	3	0	0	0	0	4	0	32(6)	3
MF	(Republic of Ireland) Tony Shields	15(9)	1	1	0	2	1	0(1)	0	18(10)	1
GK	(England) Mark Tyler	32	0	2	0	2	0	4	0	40	0
DF	(England) Matthew Wicks	17(3)	0	1	0	2	0	1	0	21(3)	0

== See also ==
- 1999–2000 in English football
