= 2000 Football League Third Division play-off final =

Association football match

- The final took place at Wembley Stadium.
| Peterborough United | Darlington |
| 1 | 0 |
- Date: 26 May 2000
- Venue: Wembley Stadium, London
- Referee: Mike Dean
- Attendance: 33,383
- Weather: Wet

The 2000 Football League Third Division play-off final was an association football match which was played on 26 May 2000 at Wembley Stadium, London, between Peterborough United and Darlington. It was to determine the fourth and final team to gain promotion from the Football League Third Division to the Second Division. The top three teams of the 1999–2000 Football League Third Division, Swansea City, Rotherham United and Northampton Town, gained automatic promotion to the Second Division, while those placed from fourth to seventh place in the table took part in play-offs. The winners of the play-off semi-finals competed for the final place for the 2000–01 season in the Second Division. The losing semi-finalists were Hartlepool United and Barnet who had been defeated by Darlington and Peterborough United respectively.

The match had been moved forward by one day and was played on a Friday evening to accommodate a friendly between England and Brazil. The referee for the final was Mike Dean and the game was played in front of 33,383 spectators on a very wet surface after persistent rain throughout the day. Darlington dominated the first half but in the 72nd minute, the ball fell to Andy Clarke from a header inside the Darlington penalty area and he scored on the rebound to make it 1–0 to Peterborough United, who were promoted to the Second Division.

Peterborough United's next season saw them finish in twelfth place in the Second Division, eight points above the relegation zone but sixteen below the play-offs. Darlington ended their following season in twentieth position in the Third Division, four places and four points above bottom-placed Barnet who were relegated.

== Route to the final ==
Football League Third Division final table, leading positions
| Pos | Team | Pld | W | D | L | GF | GA | GD | Pts |
|---|---|---|---|---|---|---|---|---|---|
| 1 | Swansea City | 46 | 24 | 13 | 9 | 51 | 30 | +21 | 85 |
| 2 | Rotherham United | 46 | 24 | 12 | 10 | 72 | 36 | +36 | 84 |
| 3 | Northampton Town | 46 | 25 | 7 | 14 | 63 | 45 | +18 | 82 |
| 4 | Darlington | 46 | 21 | 16 | 9 | 66 | 36 | +30 | 79 |
| 5 | Peterborough United | 46 | 22 | 12 | 12 | 63 | 54 | +9 | 78 |
| 6 | Barnet | 46 | 21 | 12 | 13 | 59 | 53 | +6 | 75 |
| 7 | Hartlepool United | 46 | 21 | 9 | 16 | 60 | 49 | +11 | 72 |

Darlington finished the regular 1999–2000 season in fourth position in the Third Division, the fourth tier of the English football league system, one place and one point ahead of Peterborough United. Both therefore missed out on the three automatic places for promotion to the Second Division and instead took part in the play-offs to determine the fourth promoted team. Darlington finished three points behind Northampton Town (who were promoted in third place), five behind Rotherham United (who were promoted in second place) and six behind league winners Swansea City.

Peterborough United's opposition for their play-off semi-final were Barnet with the first match of the two-legged tie being played at Underhill Stadium in Chipping Barnet on 13 May 2000. Jason Lee gave the visitors the lead in the fifth minute with a header and missed two other chances to score before being stretchered off the pitch with a knee injury. Mark Arber equalised for Barnet midway through the first half before Peterborough United had a goal disallowed: Andy Clarke's shot was goalbound but Dave Farrell applied the last touch from an offside position. In the 68th minute, Clarke won the ball from Barnet defender Mike Basham and scored with a low left-footed strike, and the match ended 2–1 to Peterborough United. The second leg took place four days later at London Road in Peterborough United. Farrell gave the home side the lead in the 28th minute when he received the ball from Richard Scott and struck it into the Barnet net from around 25 yards (23 m). He scored his and Peterborough United's second goal in the 70th minute in similar circumstances, shooting from distance past the Barnet goalkeeper Lee Harrison. Farrell completed his hat-trick a minute from the end of the game with a chip from around 30 yards (27 m). Peterborough United won the match 3–0 and progressed to the final with a 5–1 aggregate victory.

Darlington faced Hartlepool United in the other semi-final and the first leg was played at Victoria Park in Hartlepool on 13 May. Darlington's Craig Liddle brought James Coppinger down with a professional foul in the fifth minute but was only shown a yellow card. Half an hour later Liddle put his side ahead with a volley. Hartlepool United's Craig Midgley went close after taking the ball round Darlington's goalkeeper Andy Collett but his shot was wide. With a quarter of an hour to go, second-half substitute Glenn Naylor was brought down by Hartlepool's goalkeeper Martin Hollund who was sent off. Marco Gabbiadini converted the subsequent penalty past Andy Dibble, and the match ended 2–0. The second leg of the semi-final was held four days later at Feethams in Darlington. In front of their largest crowd for nine years, the home side took the lead in the ninth minute when Hartlepool defender Gary Strodder headed a cross from Darlington's Phil Brumwell into his own net for an own goal. Peter Duffield hit the Hartlepool crossbar five minutes later and Chris Freestone's headed goal in the 71st minute for the visitors was disallowed. The match ended 1–0 and Darlington progressed with a 3–0 aggregate win.

== Match ==
=== Background ===
Darlington were making their second appearance in the play-offs, having lost 1–0 to Plymouth Argyle at Wembley Stadium in the 1996 Football League Third Division play-off final. They had played in the fourth tier of English football since being relegated in the 1991–92 season. Peterborough United had also participated in the play-offs on one previous occasion, when they defeated Stockport County 2–1 in the 1992 Football League Third Division play-off final at Wembley. They had played in the Third Division since suffering relegation in the 1996–97 season. Gabbiadini was Darlington's leading scorer with a total of 27 goals during the regular season, followed by Duffield on 13. Peterborough United's top scorer was Clarke on 16 goals (15 in the league and 1 in the FA Cup) followed by Steve Castle on 10 (all in the league).

Both matches between the sides during the regular season ended in home victories: Peterborough United won 4–2 at London Road in August 1999 while Darlington were 2–0 winners at Feethams the following February. The referee for the match, which had been moved to a Friday night to accommodate a friendly between England and Brazil, was Mike Dean. Both sides adopted a 4–4–2 formation. The Wembley pitch was saturated as a result of heavy rain prior to the match. The game was broadcast live in the United Kingdom on Sky Sports. Lee was unavailable for Peterborough United having suffered a dislocated knee during the first leg of the play-off semi-final. Jesper Hjorth was a doubt for Darlington after sustaining a hamstring injury in the second leg of their semi-final.

=== Summary ===
The match kicked off around 7:45 p.m. on 26 May 2000 at a rain-soaked Wembley Stadium in front of 33,383 spectators. Gabbiadini headed a cross from Michael Oliver wide of the Peterborough goal before dragging a shot to the outside of the post in the ninth minute. He then saw a 12th-minute strike deflected over the Darlington crossbar after having cut inside from the left wing to shoot from the edge of the penalty area. In the 27th minute, Duffield's shot from 10 yards (9.1 m) under pressure from Peterborough United defender Simon Rea hit the outside of the post. Duffield then played a one-two with Oliver before striking wide and the half ended 0–0. Four minutes after the interval, a slip from Neil Aspin allowed Clarke to shoot but the ball passed narrowly wide of the Darlington goalpost. Gabbiadini then saw his shot saved by Peterborough United goalkeeper Mark Tyler in the 71st minute and then Liddle made a goal-saving tackle on Clarke who had taken the ball round Collett in the Darlington goal. A minute later, the ball fell to Clarke from a header inside the Darlington penalty area and he scored on the rebound to make it 1–0 to Peterborough United. The match ended without further scoring and Peterborough United were promoted to the Second Division with a single-goal victory.

=== Details ===
26 May 2000
19:45 BST

| Peterborough United | 1–0 | Darlington |
|---|---|---|
| Clarke 74' | Report |

Wembley Stadium, London
Attendance: 33,383
Referee: Mike Dean

| Peterborough United | Darlington |

| GK | 1 | Mark Tyler |
| DF | 3 | Adam Drury | (substituted off) 44' |
| DF | 4 | Richard Scott |
| DF | 6 | Andy Edwards |
| DF | 19 | Gareth Jelleyman |
| MF | 34 | Simon Rea |
| MF | 7 | David Farrell (yellow card) |
| MF | 11 | Jon Cullen |
| MF | 30 | Steve Castle |
| MF | 40 | David Oldfield |
| FW | 9 | Andy Clarke | (substituted off) 89' |
Substitutes:
| DF | 5 | Matt Wicks |
| GK | 7 | Bart Griemink |
| MF | 18 | Ritchie Hanlon | (substituted in) 44' |
| MF | 12 | Matthew Gill |
| FW | 14 | Francis Green | (substituted in) 89' |
Manager:
Barry Fry

| GK | 1 | Andy Collett |
| DF | 4 | Craig Liddle |
| DF | 5 | Steve Tutill |
| DF | 6 | Neil Aspin |
| DF | 15 | Paul Heckingbottom | (substituted off) 68' |
| MF | 8 | Martin Gray |
| MF | 12 | Michael Oliver |
| MF | 11 | Brian Atkinson | (substituted off) 86' |
| MF | 24 | Neil Heaney |
| FW | 10 | Marco Gabbiadini |
| FW | 9 | Peter Duffield | (substituted off) 84' |
Substitutes:
| GK | 22 | Mark Samways |
| DF | 4 | Phil Brumwell |
| MF | 34 | Paul Holsgrove | (substituted in) 86' |
| FW | 16 | Glenn Naylor | (substituted in) 68' |
| FW | 28 | Lee Nogan | (substituted in) 84' |
Manager:
David Hodgson

== Post-match ==
Peterborough United manager Barry Fry suggested Darlington made the better start and that "their experience told and they passed it around." The winning goalscorer Clarke described it as "the best moment of my life." George Reynolds, the Darlington chairman, was defiant in defeat, saying "I'm going to take this team into the Premiership as sure as night follows day".

Peterborough United's next season saw them finish in twelfth place in the Second Division, eight points above the relegation zone but sixteen below the play-offs. Darlington ended their following season in twentieth position in the Third Division, four places and four points above bottom-placed Barnet who were relegated.
