= 2000–01 Peterborough United F.C. season =

Peterborough United
2000–01 season
- Football League Second Division: 12th
- FA Cup: Third round
- League Cup: First round
- League Trophy: Second round
Home colours

The 2000–01 season saw Peterborough United compete in the Football League Second Division where they finished in 12th position with 59 points.

== Final league table ==
Pos	Team	Pld	W	D	L	GF	GA	GD	Pts
10	Wrexham	46	17	12	17	65	71	−6	63
11	Port Vale	46	16	14	16	55	49	+6	62
12	Peterborough United	46	15	14	17	61	66	−5	59
13	Wycombe Wanderers	46	15	14	17	46	53	−7	59
14	Brentford	46	14	17	15	56	70	−14	59

Rules for classification: 1) Points; 2) Goal difference; 3) Goals scored

== Results ==
Peterborough United's score comes first

=== Legend ===
Win	Draw	Loss

=== Football League Second Division ===
Match	Date	Opponent	Venue	Result	Attendance	Scorers
1	12 August 2000	Oxford United	A	1–0	5,870	Farrell
2	20 August 2000	Bristol Rovers	H	2–2	6,997	Clarke, Green
3	26 August 2000	Oldham Athletic	A	4–1	4,967	Clarke, Green, Whittingham, Jones (o.g.)
4	28 August 2000	Swansea City	H	0–2	6,428	
5	2 September 2000	Bury	H	1–1	5,286	Green
6	9 September 2000	Stoke City	A	0–3	13,011	
7	12 September 2000	Wigan Athletic	A	0–1	4,798	
8	16 September 2000	Reading	H	1–0	5,767	Cullen
9	23 September 2000	Wycombe Wanderers	A	0–2	4,980	
10	30 September 2000	Millwall	H	1–4	7,126	Shields
11	8 October 2000	Port Vale	H	2–0	4,752	Clarke, Lee
12	14 October 2000	Brentford	A	0–1	4,479	
13	17 October 2000	Walsall	A	1–1	4,716	Oldfield
14	21 October 2000	Notts County	H	1–0	5,889	Clarke
15	24 October 2000	Bristol City	A	1–2	9,219	Farrell
16	28 October 2000	Colchester United	H	3–1	5,469	McKenzie, Lee, Clarke
17	4 November 2000	Bournemouth	A	1–2	3,936	Farrell
18	11 November 2000	Swindon Town	H	4–0	5,700	Farrell, McKenzie (2), Forsyth
19	25 November 2000	Rotherham United	A	0–3	5,519	
20	2 December 2000	Wrexham	H	1–0	5,381	McKenzie
21	15 December 2000	Cambridge United	A	0–0	7,505	
22	23 December 2000	Northampton Town	H	1–2	9,868	McKenzie
23	26 December 2000	Luton Town	A	2–3	7,374	McKenzie, Farrell
24	1 January 2001	Oldham Athletic	H	0–0	5,039	
25	13 January 2001	Swansea City	A	2–2	5,288	McKenzie, Clarke
26	27 January 2001	Northampton Town	A	0–0	7,079	
27	30 January 2001	Oxford United	H	4–2	4,004	Oldfield, McKenzie, Clarke, Gill
28	3 February 2001	Bury	A	1–2	2,725	Forinton
29	10 February 2001	Stoke City	H	0–4	7,568	
30	17 February 2001	Reading	A	1–1	10,342	Lee
31	20 February 2001	Wigan Athletic	H	2–0	4,111	Rea, M. Williams
32	24 February 2001	Wycombe Wanderers	H	3–2	4,731	Lee, McKenzie
33	3 March 2001	Millwall	A	0–0	11,658	
34	6 March 2001	Brentford	H	1–1	4,479	M. Williams
35	10 March 2001	Port Vale	A	0–5	4,787	
36	23 March 2001	Notts County	A	3–3	6,510	McKenzie, Farrell, Green
37	27 March 2001	Luton Town	H	1–1	5,425	Clarke
38	31 March 2001	Cambridge United	H	4–1	10,086	Farrell, Green, Lee, Forsyth
39	7 April 2001	Wrexham	A	1–2	2,678	Edwards
40	11 April 2001	Bristol Rovers	A	2–1	6,540	Hanlon, Jones (o.g.)
41	14 April 2001	Bristol City	H	2–1	6,560	McKenzie, Green
42	17 April 2001	Colchester United	A	2–2	4,336	Lee, Oldfield
43	21 April 2001	Bournemouth	H	1–2	6,381	Clarke
44	24 April 2001	Walsall	H	2–0	5,549	Lee, Rea
45	28 April 2001	Swindon Town	A	1–2	8,145	Reeves (o.g.)
46	5 May 2001	Rotherham United	H	1–1	11,274	McKenzie

=== FA Cup ===
Match	Date	Opponent	Venue	Result	Attendance	Scorers
R1	18 November 2000	Mansfield Town	A	1–1	3,257	Farrell
R1 Replay	28 November 2000	Mansfield Town	H	4–0	4,540	Oldfield, Edwards, Clarke, Shields
R2	10 December 2000	Oldham Athletic	H	1–1	5,662	Lee
R2 Replay	19 December 2000	Oldham Athletic	A	1–0	3,404	Forsyth
R3	6 January 2001	Chelsea	A	0–5	31,932	

=== Football League Cup ===
Match	Date	Opponent	Venue	Result	Attendance	Scorers
R1 1st leg	22 August 2000	Luton Town	A	0–0	3,175	
R1 2nd leg	5 September 2000	Luton Town	H	2–2	4,286	Farrell, Clarke

Peterborough United eliminated on away goal rule

=== Football League Trophy ===
Match	Date	Opponent	Venue	Result	Attendance	Scorers
R1	5 December 2000	Luton Town	H	1–0	2,075	Green
R2	9 January 2001	Barnet	H	1–3	1,891	Cullen

== Squad statistics ==
No.	Pos.	Name	League		FA Cup		League Cup		Other		Total	
No.	Pos.	Name	Apps	Goals	Apps	Goals	Apps	Goals	Apps	Goals	Apps	Goals
1	GK	(England) Mark Tyler	40	0	5	0	2	0	0	0	47	0
2	DF	(England) Dean Hooper	28(4)	0	3(1)	0	2	0	2	0	35(5)	0
3	DF	(Northern Ireland) Steve Morrow	11	0	0	0	0	0	0	0	11	0
3	DF	(England) Adam Drury	29	0	5	0	2	0	0(1)	0	36(1)	0
4	MF	(England) Richard Scott	18(2)	0	0	0	0(2)	0	1	0	19(4)	0
5	DF	(England) Simon Rea	35(1)	2	3	0	2	0	1	0	41(1)	2
6	DF	(England) Andy Edwards	43	1	5	1	2	0	0	0	50	2
7	MF	(England) David Farrell	39(5)	7	5	1	1(1)	1	0	0	45(6)	9
8	MF	(Australia) David Oldfield	32(7)	3	5	1	2	0	0	0	39(7)	4
9	FW	(England) Andy Clarke	36(6)	9	4	1	1	1	1	0	42(6)	11
10	FW	(England) Jason Lee	14(16)	7	4	1	0	0	0(1)	0	18(17)	8
11	MF	(England) Jon Cullen	12(6)	1	1	0	0(1)	0	2	1	15(7)	2
12	MF	(England) Matthew Gill	11(5)	1	3	0	0	0	1	0	15(5)	1
13	GK	(Republic of Ireland) Dan Connor	0	0	0	0	0	0	2	0	2	0
14	FW	(England) Francis Green	18(14)	6	2	0	2	0	2	1	24(14)	7
15	DF	(England) Dan Murray	1(2)	0	0	0	0	0	2	0	3(2)	0
16	FW	(England) Martin Williams	13(2)	2	0	0	0	0	0	0	13(2)	2
16	MF	(England) Matthew Hann	0	0	0	0	0	0	0	0	0	0
17	FW	(England) Leon McKenzie	30	13	3(1)	0	0	0	0	0	33(1)	13
18	MF	(England) Ritchie Hanlon	21(5)	1	0(1)	0	1(1)	0	2	0	24(7)	1
19	DF	(Wales) Gareth Jelleyman	6(2)	0	1(1)	0	0	0	2	0	9(3)	0
20	MF	(Northern Ireland) Tony Shields	28(5)	1	1(3)	1	1(1)	0	0	0	30(9)	2
21	FW	(England) Howard Forinton	2(6)	1	0(2)	0	2	0	1	0	4(6)	1
22	MF	(Cyprus) Tom Williams	1(1)	0	0	0	0	0	0	0	1(1)	0
22	FW	(England) Drewe Broughton	0	0	0	0	0	0	0	0	0	0
22	DF	(England) Dave Rogers	1(2)	0	0	0	0	0	1	0	2(2)	0
22	GK	(England) Stuart Taylor	6	0	0	0	0	0	0	0	6	0
23	MF	(Iceland) Helgi Daníelsson	3(3)	0	0	0	0	0	0	0	3(3)	0
24	MF	(England) Daniel French	1(1)	0	0	0	0	0	1(1)	0	2(2)	0
25	MF	(England) Richard Forsyth	25(5)	2	5	1	2	0	(1)	0	32(6)	3
26	DF	(England) Gary McDonald	1	0	0	0	0	0	0	0	1	0
26	DF	(England) Matt Wicks	0	0	0	0	0	0	0	0	0	0
27	FW	(England) Guy Whittingham	1(4)	1	0	0	1	0	0	0	2(4)	1
