= 1997–98 Birmingham City F.C. season =

Birmingham City F.C.
1997–98 season
- Chairman: David Gold
- Manager: Trevor Francis
- Ground: St Andrew's
- Division One: 7th
- FA Cup: Fifth round (eliminated by Leeds United)
- League Cup: Third round (eliminated by Arsenal)
- Top goalscorer: League: Paul Furlong (15); All: Paul Furlong (19)
- Highest home attendance: 24,663 vs Nottingham Forest, 21 March 1998
- Lowest home attendance: 4,900 vs Stockport County, League Cup 2nd round 1st leg, 17 September 1997
- Average home league attendance: 18,751
Home colours

The 1997–98 season was Birmingham City Football Club's 95th in the Football League. They finished in seventh position in the 24-team Division One, the second tier of the English football league system, missing out on the playoff places on goals scored. Needing to win their last game, at home to Charlton Athletic, and hope that Sheffield United failed to win theirs, Birmingham "were repeatedly foiled in this emotionally-charged game by a brilliant display from Charlton's goalkeeper" Saša Ilić; the game finished goalless. They entered the 1997–98 FA Cup at the third round, losing to Leeds United in the fifth, and entered the League Cup in the first round and lost to Arsenal in the third.

In August 1997, co-owner David Gold took up the post of chairman after Jack Wiseman's retirement.

== Football League First Division ==
=== Match details ===
Date	League position	Opponents	Venue	Result	Score F–A	Scorers	Attendance	Report
9 August 1997	1st	Stoke City	H	W	2–0	Devlin 33', Ndlovu 87'	20,608	
23 August 1997	5th	Reading	H	W	3–0	Devlin 38', Bruce 81', Ndlovu 88'	16,495	
29 August 1997	3rd	Stockport County	A	D	2–2	Devlin 68', Francis 72'	6,260	
2 September 1997	3rd	Tranmere Rovers	A	W	3–0	Hughes 11', Ndlovu 44', Furlong 65'	6,620	
9 September 1997	2nd	Huddersfield Town	A	W	1–0	Furlong 70'	9,477	
14 September 1997	4th	Sunderland	H	L	0–1		17,478	
20 September 1997	7th	Middlesbrough	A	L	1–3	Furlong 51'	30,125	
27 September 1997	7th	Sheffield United	A	D	0–0		20,553	
4 October 1997	9th	Crewe Alexandra	H	L	0–1		16,548	
12 October 1997	6th	Wolverhampton Wanderers	H	W	1–0	Marsden 8'	17,822	
18 October 1997	8th	Bury	A	L	1–2	Grainger 90'	5,700	
22 October 1997	12th	Charlton Athletic	A	D	1–1	Devlin 83'	10,070	
25 October 1997	12th	Oxford United	H	D	0–0		16,352	
28 October 1997	11th	Ipswich Town	H	D	1–1	Bruce 81'	16,778	
1 November 1997	11th	Queens Park Rangers	A	D	1–1	Furlong 42'	12,715	
4 November 1997	13th	Bradford City	H	D	0–0		14,554	
8 November 1997	14th	Norwich City	H	L	1–2	Devlin 27' pen.	16,464	
15 November 1997	14th	Nottingham Forest	A	L	0–1		19,610	
23 November 1997	14th	West Bromwich Albion	A	L	0–1		18,444	
29 November 1997	14th	Portsmouth	H	W	2–1	Furlong (2) 36', 73'	17,738	
6 December 1997	11th	Port Vale	A	W	1–0	Cottee 18'	7,509	
13 December 1997	11th	Manchester City	H	W	2–1	Forster 90', O'Connor 90'	21,014	
20 December 1997	11th	Swindon Town	A	D	1–1	Forster 22'	10,900	
26 December 1997	10th	Ipswich Town	A	W	1–0	McCarthy 83'	17,459	
28 December 1997	10th	Tranmere Rovers	H	D	0–0		19,533	
10 January 1998	8th	Stoke City	A	W	7–0	Hughes (2) 4', 9', Forster 26, Furlong (3) 50', 69', 87', McCarthy 56'	14,940	
17 January 1998	8th	Huddersfield Town	H	D	0–0		17,850	
27 January 1998	7th	Stockport County	H	W	4–1	Furlong (3) 7', 31', 90', McCarthy 16'	17,118	
31 January 1998	9th	Reading	A	L	0–2		10,315	
7 February 1998	9th	Middlesbrough	H	D	1–1	McCarthy 3'	20,639	
17 February 1998	9th	Crewe Alexandra	A	W	2–0	Adebola 42', Hughes 45'	5,559	
22 February 1998	8th	Sheffield United	H	W	2–0	Grainger 31', Johnson 66'	17,965	
25 February 1998	9th	Bury	H	L	1–3	Johnson 90'	20,021	
28 February 1998	6th	Wolverhampton Wanderers	A	W	3–1	Ndlovu (2) 35', 77' pen., Adebola 71'	25,591	
4 March 1998	8th	Norwich City	A	D	3–3	Ndlovu (2) 13', 88', Adebola 44'	9,819	
7 March 1998	7th	Queens Park Rangers	H	W	1–0	Adebola 68'	18,298	
10 March 1998	6th	Sunderland	A	D	1–1	Adebola 50'	37,602	
14 March 1998	7th	Bradford City	A	D	0–0		16,392	
21 March 1998	7th	Nottingham Forest	H	L	1–2	Ndlovu 61' pen.	24,663	
28 March 1998	7th	West Bromwich Albion	H	W	1–0	Johnson 90'	23,260	
4 April 1998	7th	Portsmouth	A	D	1–1	Adebola 84'	14,591	
11 April 1998	7th	Port Vale	H	D	1–1	Ndlovu 87'	17,193	
13 April 1998	7th	Manchester City	A	W	1–0	Adebola 90'	29,569	
18 April 1998	7th	Swindon Town	H	W	3–0	Furlong (2) 9', 34' pen., Hughes 82'	17,016	
25 April 1998	7th	Oxford United	A	W	2–0	Ford 73' o.g., Furlong 85'	8,818	
3 May 1998	7th	Charlton Athletic	H	D	0–0		25,877	

=== League table ===
Pos	Team	Pld	W	D	L	GF	GA	GD	Pts	Qualification or relegation
5	Ipswich Town	46	23	14	9	77	43	+34	83	Qualification for the First Division play-offs
6	Sheffield United	46	19	17	10	69	54	+15	74	Qualification for the First Division play-offs
7	Birmingham City	46	19	17	10	60	35	+25	74	
8	Stockport County	46	19	8	19	71	69	+2	65	
9	Wolverhampton Wanderers	46	18	11	17	57	53	+4	65	

Rules for classification: 1) Points; 2) Goals scored; 3) Goal difference

=== Results summary ===
Overall								Home						Away					
Pld	W	D	L	GF	GA	GD	Pts	W	D	L	GF	GA	GD	W	D	L	GF	GA	GD
46	19	17	10	60	35	+25	74	10	8	5	27	15	+12	9	9	5	33	20	+13

== FA Cup ==
Round	Date	Opponents	Venue	Result	Score F–A	Scorers	Attendance	Report
Third round	4 January 1998	Crewe Alexandra	A	W	2–1	Furlong 22' pen., 55'	4,607	
Fourth round	24 January 1998	Stockport County	H	W	2–1	Hughes 32', 84'	15,882	
Fifth round	14 February 1998	Leeds United	A	L	2–3	Ablett 63', Ndlovu 81'	35,463	

== League Cup ==
Round	Date	Opponents	Venue	Result	Score F–A	Scorers	Attendance	Report
First round 1st leg	12 August 1997	Gillingham	A	W	1–0	Francis 85'	5,246	
First round 2nd leg	26 August 1997	Gillingham	H	W	3–0; 4–0 agg.	Devlin 68', Ndlovu 75', Furlong 78'	7,921	
Second round 1st leg	17 September 1997	Stockport County	H	W	4–1	Hughes 41', Robinson 51', Devlin 77' pen., 87'	4,900	
Second round 2nd leg	23 September 1997	Stockport County	A	L	1–2; 5–3 agg.	Furlong 70' pen.	2,074	
Third round	14 October 1997	Arsenal	A	L	1–4	Hey 20'	27,097	

== Transfers ==
=== In ===
Date	Player	Club†	Fee	Ref
July 1997	Peter Ndlovu	Coventry City	£1.6m	
August 1997	Jerry Gill	Yeovil Town	£30,000	
August 1997	Howard Forinton	Yeovil Town	£70,000	
August 1997	Tony Hey	SC Fortuna Köln	£300,000	
September 1997	Jon McCarthy	Port Vale	£1.5m	
October 1997	Chris Marsden	Stockport County	£500,000	
January 1998	Simon Charlton	Southampton	£200,000	
February 1998	Dele Adebola	Crewe Alexandra	£1m	
February 1998	Darren Purse	Oxford United	£700,000^{a}	

a. Purse joined from Oxford United in exchange for £600,000 and Kevin Francis, with Francis valued at £100,000.

=== Out ===
Date	Player	Fee	Joined†	Ref
July 1997	Dave Barnett	Free	(Dunfermline Athletic)	
July 1997	Mike Newell	£160,000	Aberdeen	
August 1997	Kenny Brown	£40,000	Millwall	
October 1997	Barry Horne	Free	Huddersfield Town	
December 1997	Jason Bowen	£200,000	Reading	
February 1998	Kevin Francis	£100,000^{a}	Oxford United	
February 1998	Andy Legg	£75,000	Reading	
March 1998	Paul Devlin	£200,000	Sheffield United	

† Brackets round a club denote the player joined that club after his Birmingham City contract expired.
a. Valued at £100,000 in the deal in which Darren Purse joined Birmingham from Oxford United in exchange for £600,000 plus Francis.

=== Loan in ===
Date	Player	Club	Return	Ref
November 1997	Tony Cottee	Leicester City	One month	
December 1997	Simon Charlton	Southampton	One month	

=== Loan out ===
Date	Player	Club	Return	Ref
September 1997	Ricky Otto	Notts County	One month	
December 1997	Paul Tait	Northampton Town	One month	

== Appearances and goals ==
Numbers in parentheses denote appearances made as a substitute.
Players with name in italics and marked * were on loan from another club for the whole of their season with Birmingham.
Players marked † left the club during the playing season.
Players listed with no appearances have been in the matchday squad but only as unused substitutes.
Key to positions: GK – Goalkeeper; DF – Defender; MF – Midfielder; FW – Forward

Players' appearances and goals by competition
Pos.	Nat.	Name	League		FA Cup		League Cup		Total		Discipline	
Pos.	Nat.	Name	Apps	Goals	Apps	Goals	Apps	Goals	Apps	Goals	A yellow rectangle, denoting the yellow penalty card shown to a player being cautioned	A red rectangle, denoting the red penalty card shown to a player being sent off
GK	ENG	Ian Bennett	45	0	3	0	5	0	53	0	0	0
GK	ENG	Kevin Poole	1	0	0	0	0	0	1	0	0	0
DF	ENG	Gary Ablett	34 (2)	0	3	1	5	0	42 (2)	1	4	0
DF	ENG	Jon Bass	30	0	3	0	3 (1)	0	36 (1)	0	1	0
DF	ENG	Steve Bruce	40	2	3	0	2	0	45	2	8	0
DF	ENG	Simon Charlton	23 (1)	0	1	0	0	0	24 (1)	0	4	0
DF	ENG	Jerry Gill	3	0	0	0	0	0	3	0	0	0
DF	ENG	Martin Grainger	27 (6)	2	3	0	4 (1)	0	34 (7)	2	7	0
DF	JAM	Michael Johnson	22 (16)	3	0 (2)	0	1 (4)	0	23 (22)	3	3	1
DF	ENG	Darren Purse	2 (6)	0	0	0	0	0	2 (6)	0	1	0
DF	ENG	Simon Rea	0	0	0	0	0	0	0	0	0	0
DF	ENG	Darren Wassall	14	0	0	0	5	0	19	0	4	2
MF	SCO	Paul Devlin †	13 (9)	5	0 (1)	0	5	3	18 (10)	8	2	0
MF	GER	Tony Hey	8 (1)	0	0	0	2	1	10 (1)	1	0	0
MF	ENG	Chris Holland	2 (8)	0	0	0	3	0	5 (8)	0	1	0
MF	ENG	Bryan Hughes	34 (6)	5	3	2	4	1	41 (6)	8	1	0
MF	ENG	Chris Marsden	31 (1)	1	2	0	0	0	33 (1)	1	6	1
MF	NIR	Jon McCarthy	41	4	3	0	0	0	44	4	4	0
MF	ENG	Martyn O'Connor	32 (1)	1	3	0	3	0	38 (1)	1	3	0
MF	ENG	Steve Robinson	17 (8)	0	0 (1)	0	4	1	21 (9)	1	2	0
FW	NGA	Dele Adebola	16 (1)	7	0	0	0	0	16 (1)	7	1	0
FW	ENG	Tony Cottee *	4 (1)	1	0	0	0	0	4 (1)	1	0	0
FW	ENG	Howard Forinton	0 (1)	0	0	0	0	0	0 (1)	0	0	0
FW	ENG	Nicky Forster	12 (16)	3	3	0	0	0	15 (16)	3	1	0
FW	SKN	Kevin Francis †	2 (18)	1	0 (2)	0	0 (5)	1	2 (25)	2	3	0
FW	ENG	Paul Furlong	24 (1)	15	2	2	4	2	30 (1)	19	8	1
FW	ZIM	Peter Ndlovu	29 (10)	9	1 (1)	1	5	1	35 (11)	11	5	0

Players not included in matchday squads
Pos.	Nat.	Name
MF	WAL	Jason Bowen †
MF	WAL	Barry Horne †
MF	WAL	Andy Legg †
MF	ENG	Ricky Otto
MF	ENG	Paul Tait

== See also ==
- List of Birmingham City F.C. seasons

== Sources ==
- Matthews, Tony (1995). Birmingham City: A Complete Record. Derby: Breedon Books. ISBN 978-1-85983-010-9.
- Matthews, Tony (2010). Birmingham City: The Complete Record. Derby: DB Publishing. ISBN 978-1-85983-853-2.
- For match dates, league positions and results: "Birmingham City 1997–1998: Results". Statto Organisation. Archived from the original on 27 June 2013.
- For lineups, appearances, goalscorers and attendances: Matthews (2010), Complete Record, pp. 430–431.
- For goal times: "Birmingham Results 1997/98". Soccerbase. Centurycomm.
- For transfers: "Birmingham Transfers 1997/98". Soccerbase. Centurycomm.
- For discipline: individual player pages linked from "Birmingham Squad details 1997/98". Soccerbase. Centurycomm. Soccerbase omits details of the visit to Nottingham Forest, so cards received in that game are sourced from Rodgers, Ian (15 November 1997). "Nottingham Forest 1 Birmingham 0". sportinglife.com. British Sky Broadcasting. PA Sport. Archived from the original on 6 March 2016.
