= Grant Haley =

Grant Haley may refer to:

- Grant Haley (footballer)
- Grant Haley (American football)
