= Simon Rea =

Simon Rea may refer to:

- Simon Rea (footballer)
- Simon Rea (tennis)
