= Jon Cullen =

English footballer (born 1973)

Personal information
- Full name: David Jonathan Cullen
- Date of birth: 10 January 1973 (age 53)
- Place of birth: Bishop Auckland, England
- Height: 6 ft 0 in (1.83 m)
- Position: Midfielder

Youth career
- 19??–1991: Doncaster Rovers

Senior career*
Years	Team	Apps	(Gls)
1991–1993	Doncaster Rovers	9	(0)
1992–199?	→ Bishop Auckland (loan)		
1993–1996	Spennymoor United		
1996–1997	Morpeth Town		
1997–1998	Hartlepool United	34	(12)
1998–2000	Sheffield United	4	(0)
1999	→ Shrewsbury Town (loan)	10	(1)
1999	→ Hartlepool United (loan)	0	(0)
1999–2000	→ Halifax Town (loan)	11	(5)
2000–2002	Peterborough United	44	(5)
2001	→ Carlisle United (loan)	11	(0)
2002	Darlington	3	(0)
2002–2003	Spennymoor United		
2003	Morpeth Town		
2003	Halifax Town	7	(0)
2003–2004	Spennymoor United		
2004–2005	Washington Nissan		
2005–2006	Newcastle Blue Star		
2006–2008	Sunderland Nissan		
2008	Morpeth Town		
2008–2009	Horden Colliery Welfare		
- * Club domestic league appearances and goals

David Jonathan Cullen (born 10 January 1973) is an English former professional footballer who made 126 appearances in the Football League in the 1990s and 2000s. A midfielder, he played League football for Doncaster Rovers, Hartlepool United, Sheffield United, Shrewsbury Town, Halifax Town, Peterborough United, Carlisle United and Darlington, and non-League football for a number of clubs in the north of England.

== Life and career ==
Cullen was born in Bishop Auckland, County Durham, in 1973. He came through the youth system at Doncaster Rovers and made his senior debut on 11 May 1991, in the starting eleven for the last Fourth Division match of the 1990–91 season, away to Gillingham. Doncaster lost 2–0. Cullen turned professional in September 1991, and made a handful of first-team appearances in the first half of that season, but dropped out of contention. In 1992–93, he spent time on loan at Northern Premier League Premier Division club Bishop Auckland. After one more substitute appearance in August 1993, Doncaster released him and he joined another Northern Premier League club, Spennymoor United, where he spent three seasons before moving on to Morpeth Town of the Northern League.

In March 1997, Cullen returned to the Football League when Hartlepool United manager Mick Tait signed him from Morpeth for a fee of £1,000 and a significant sell-on clause. Under Tait's management, he emerged as what the Northern Echo called a cultured playmaker, and his developing goalscoring form in the 1997–98 season – 12 goals from 28 Third Division (fourth-tier) matches – earned him a move to First Division club Sheffield United. The club could not risk rejecting the £250,000 fee, of which £75,000 had to go to Morpeth, because he would have been able to leave at the end of the season for free under the Bosman ruling. Despite leaving both club and division in January, Cullen remained Hartlepool's top scorer for the season and was named in the Third Division Team of the Year.

Cullen did not reproduce his Hartlepool form at the higher level. He made just four substitute appearances in 18 months, and in the 1999–2000 season spent spells on loan to Shrewsbury Town and Halifax Town, both Third Division clubs, before joining Peterborough United for a £35,000 fee in March 2000. He played regularly for what remained of the season, helped his team reach the play-offs, and played well in the final as Peterborough beat Darlington 1–0 to gain promotion to the Second Division. He continued in the first team until injuries intervened, and after a cartilage operation he finished the season on loan at Carlisle United. Cullen was released at the end of the 2001–02 season, during which he made 17 appearances, and he signed a one-month contract with Third Division Darlington. After four matches, his deal was extended, but he was let go two weeks later, and he returned to his former club of Spennymoor.

A trial with Malaysian club Selangor in February yielded nothing, and Cullen made a brief return to another former club, Morpeth Town, before trying his luck equally fruitlessly in the United States with the Chicago Fire and the Long Island Rough Riders in March and April. He finished the season back at Morpeth, played seven Conference matches for Halifax Town at the start of the 2003–04 season, before another spell with Spennymoor, during which he scored a hat-trick of penalties. He then played Northern League football for Washington Nissan, Newcastle Blue Star, further spells with the renamed Sunderland Nissan and with Morpeth Town, and Horden Colliery Welfare.

== Career statistics ==
Appearances and goals by club, season and competition
Club	Season	League			FA Cup		League Cup		Other		Total	
Club	Season	Division	Apps	Goals	Apps	Goals	Apps	Goals	Apps	Goals	Apps	Goals
Doncaster Rovers	1991–92	Fourth Division	1	0	0	0	0	0	0	0	1	0
Doncaster Rovers	1992–93	Fourth Division	8	0	1	0	2	1	1 (Note: Appearance(s) in Football League Trophy)	0	12	1
Doncaster Rovers	1993–94	Third Division	0	0	0	0	0	0	0	0	0	0
Doncaster Rovers	1994–95	Third Division	0	0	0	0	1	0	0	0	1	0
Doncaster Rovers	Total		9	0	1	0	3	1	1	0	14	1
Hartlepool United	1996–97	Third Division	6	0	—		—		—		6	0
Hartlepool United	1997–98	Third Division	28	12	1	0	2	0	2	0	33	12
Hartlepool United	Total		34	12	1	0	2	0	2	0	39	12
Sheffield United	1997–98	First Division	2	0	—		—		—		2	0
Sheffield United	1998–99	First Division	2	0	0	0	0	0	—		2	0
Sheffield United	1999–2000	First Division	0	0	0	0	0	0	—		0	0
Sheffield United	Total		4	0	0	0	0	0	—		4	0
Shrewsbury Town (loan)	1999–2000	Third Division	10	1	—		—		—		10	1
Halifax Town (loan)	1999–2000	Third Division	11	5	—		—		—		11	5
Peterborough United	1999–2000	Third Division	13	3	—		—		1 (Note: Appearance in Football League play-offs)	0	14	3
Peterborough United	2000–01	Second Division	18	1	1	0	1	0	2	1	22	2
Peterborough United	2001–02	Second Division	13	1	2	0	1	0	1	0	17	1
Peterborough United	Total		44	5	3	0	2	0	4	1	53	6
Carlisle United (loan)	2000–01	Third Division	11	0	—		—		—		11	0
Darlington	2002–03	Third Division	3	0	—		1	0	—		4	0
Halifax Town	2003–04	Conference	7	0	—		—		—		7	0
Total			133	23	5	0	8	1	7	1	153	25

== Honours ==
Peterborough United

- Football League Third Division play-offs: 2000

Individual

- PFA Team of the Year: 1997–98 Third Division
