= Mark Tyler (footballer) =

English footballer

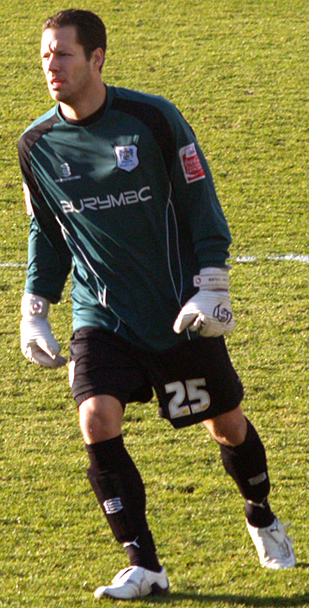
- Tyler playing for Bury in 2009

Personal information
- Full name: Mark Richard Tyler
- Date of birth: 2 April 1977 (age 49)
- Place of birth: Norwich, England
- Height: 6 ft 0 in (1.83 m)
- Position: Goalkeeper

Youth career
- 1988–1992: Norwich City
- 1992–1994: Peterborough United

Senior career*
Years	Team	Apps	(Gls)
1994–2009	Peterborough United	413	(0)
1995	→ Billericay Town (loan)		
1996	→ Yeovil Town (loan)	4	(0)
2008	→ Hull City (loan)	0	(0)
2008	→ Watford (loan)	0	(0)
2009	→ Bury (loan)	11	(0)
2009–2016	Luton Town	257	(0)
2016	→ Peterborough United (loan)	3	(0)
2016–2021	Peterborough United	3	(0)
Total		691	(0)

International career
- England U17
- England U20
- * Club domestic league appearances and goals

Mark Richard Tyler (born 2 April 1977) is an English former professional footballer who played as a goalkeeper. He was last the goalkeeping coach at EFL League One club Peterborough United. He played for the England national under-17 team and the England national under-20 team.

== Career ==
=== Peterborough United ===
Born in Norwich, Norfolk, Tyler started his career as a trainee at hometown club Norwich City during the 1988–89 season. He then had trials for the Ipswich Town and Cambridge United youth teams during the 1992–93 season, before signing for the Peterborough United youth team, from which he progressed before the start of the 1994–95 season.

His first senior game for Peterborough came on 18 September 1994 in a 4–0 defeat away to Birmingham City. The game marked the beginning of three consecutive first-team appearances for Tyler, as he featured in a 2–2 draw with Rotherham United on 24 September 1994, followed by another defeat to Birmingham City which finished 5–3 in the Football League Trophy first round on 27 September 1994. Tyler was recalled to the first-team for the second-round game on 29 November 1994, a 2–0 away defeat to Hereford United. He featured twice in league games during January 1995, replacing loanee Fred Barber as a 17th-minute substitute in a 0–0 draw with Bradford City on 14 January 1995, before making a starting appearance in a 1–1 draw away at Chester City on 28 January 1995. Tyler failed to make a further appearance until 22 April 1995 in a 1–0 win over Blackpool, his final game of the season. All in all, he made seven appearances in all competitions during the 1994–95 season at the age of 17.

During the 1995–96 season, Tyler failed to make an appearance for Peterborough, spending time out on loan with Isthmian League First Division club Billericay Town. In the 1996–97 season, he made three league appearances for Peterborough, firstly playing in a 1–1 draw away at Plymouth Argyle on 1 October 1996, secondly a 4–3 away win over Preston North End on 5 October 1996, lastly a 4–0 away defeat to Walsall on 9 November 1996. He was later loaned out to Isthmian League Premier Division club Yeovil Town, where he made four appearances. After returning to Peterborough, he made his fourth and final appearance of the season in their Football League Trophy southern section final first leg match against Colchester United, resulting in a 2–0 win.

In the 1997–98 season, with Peterborough now in the Third Division, Tyler established himself as the club's first-choice goalkeeper at the age of 20, playing in every league game and making 57 appearances in all competitions. He went on to make 31 appearances in all competitions during the 1998–99 season.

Peterborough won promotion to the Second Division via the play-offs in a successful 1999–2000 season, with Tyler keeping a clean sheet in a 1–0 win over Darlington in the 2000 Football League Third Division play-off final at Wembley Stadium. He made 40 appearances in all competitions during the season.

By now an ever-present in the Peterborough first-team, Tyler regularly played in over 40 games per season, and was named in the 2001–02 PFA Second Division Team of the Year. His career was not without injuries: a punctured lung sustained in 1999 kept him out of the team for a month, while a recurring wrist and hand fracture led to spells on the sidelines, particularly in early 2003.

When Irish businessman Darragh MacAnthony became chairman and owner of Peterborough in August 2007, bringing money and ambition to the club, Tyler lost his first-team place to £400,000 record signing Joe Lewis, eventually being demoted to third choice goalkeeper behind youngster James McKeown and placed on the transfer list. Tyler played 21 times in all competitions, all before the signing of Lewis, as Peterborough won promotion as runners-up from League Two in the 2007–08 season. In January 2008, he was signed on loan by Hull City for two months as cover for Hull's Matt Duke, who underwent an operation to remove a testicular tumour.

Peterborough won a second consecutive promotion the following season, though Tyler would play no part, as he was rarely even on the substitutes bench. He signed an emergency loan deal with Watford in September 2008 to aid in their goalkeeping injury crisis, though he never played a game. Tyler signed a one-month loan deal with League Two club Bury on 9 January 2009. His loan was later extended for a further month on 5 February 2009, after keeping three clean sheets in five appearances. He made a total of 11 appearances, of which seven resulted in wins.

Over the course of 15 years at London Road, Tyler made 486 appearances in all competitions. His loyal service to Peterborough resulted in a testimonial match organised by the club against Liverpool on 21 July 2007, in a game watched by a crowd of 9,339 fans.

On 15 June 2009, with the realisation that the opportunity for first-team football at Peterborough was becoming increasingly rare, Tyler had his contract cancelled by mutual consent.

=== Luton Town ===
Three days after his contract was cancelled, Tyler signed a two-year deal with Conference Premier club Luton Town. Many players from his time at Peterborough were now in the Luton dressing room, including Shane Blackett, Claude Gnakpa, Liam Hatch, Adam Newton and Alan White, with Tyler admitting he would have no problems settling into his new club. Tyler became an instant fan favourite at Kenilworth Road, saving two penalties in his first few months at the club. A broken finger kept Tyler out of action for a portion of the season, though he still made 40 appearances in all competitions in the 2009–10 season, as Luton finished second in the table. However, Luton missed out on promotion, losing 2–0 to York City on aggregate in the play-off semi-finals.

The 2010–11 season saw Tyler win the Player of the Season award for his performances, helping Luton to reach third position in the table, thus securing a second consecutive play-off place. However, the team lost in a penalty shoot-out to AFC Wimbledon in the 2011 Conference Premier play-off final, with Tyler saving one penalty. At the end of the campaign, he signed a one-year contract extension to stay at Luton until June 2012.

The 2011–12 season saw him dropped at times for second-choice goalkeeper Kevin Pilkington though, in December 2011, Tyler signed a further contract extension to keep him at the club until the summer of 2013. Following Pilkington's decision to join Notts County as goalkeeping coach in February 2012, Tyler played in all games, including the 2–1 defeat to York City in the 2012 Conference Premier play-off final. He was named in the 2011–12 Conference Premier Team of the Year in recognition of his performances, alongside Luton teammate János Kovács.

Tyler made 46 appearances for Luton in all competitions during the 2012–13 season, as the club finished in seventh place in the league. He made six FA Cup appearances as Luton reached the fifth round, missing out on the chance to become the first non-league club to reach the sixth round in 99 years after losing 3–0 at home to Millwall. However, Tyler kept clean sheets in both of Luton's 1–0 wins over Championship club Wolverhampton Wanderers in the third round, followed by his boyhood Premier League club Norwich City in the fourth round. He made one appearance in the FA Trophy, a 2–2 draw with Dorchester Town in the first round. Luton were eventually knocked out in a 3–0 defeat to Grimsby Town in the quarter-finals. Tyler signed a one-year extension to his contract in May 2013.

Tyler played in every minute of every league game during the 2013–14 season, keeping a club-record 23 clean sheets, as Luton won the Conference Premier title and promotion to League Two. Tyler triggered a contract extension during the season, keeping him at Luton until 2015.

Tyler continued as first-choice goalkeeper for the 2014–15 season, making 31 league appearances, keeping 14 clean sheets and triggering a one-year contract extension in the process. However, a knee injury resulted in him being ruled out for the final third of the campaign and was replaced by Elliot Justham. Luton finished the season eighth, just outside the play-off places.

In the 2015–16 season, Tyler sustained a back injury eight minutes into the first game under the tenure of new Luton manager Nathan Jones, a 0–0 draw with Cambridge United on 16 January 2016. On transfer deadline day during the January transfer window, it was reported Tyler had been approached by Peterborough about a return to the club as cover for Ben Alnwick. However, a transfer failed to materialise, with Tyler claiming Luton had "pulled the plug" on the move, a claim manager Nathan Jones denied, stating no official deadline day approach was made. However, Peterborough chairman Darragh MacAnthony later clarified the situation, claiming that Jones was "misinformed" and in fact an approach was made for Tyler's services, but was turned down by Luton. Tyler was recalled to the first-team in a 2–1 win over Hartlepool United on 20 February 2016. He made two further appearances in a 3–2 win over York City on 27 February 2016, followed by a 1–0 win over Morecambe on 1 March 2016. However, Tyler's situation changed once more when it was revealed a re-occurrence of his back injury would keep him out for the rest of the season, as talks with Peterborough resumed about a potential return. This led to Derby County goalkeeper Jonathan Mitchell being brought in on loan until the end of the season as Tyler's replacement. Tyler made a total of 31 appearances for Luton during the season in all competitions.

=== Return to Peterborough United ===
On 8 March 2016, Tyler's return to former club Peterborough United was confirmed as a player-coach on a three-month loan deal with a view to a permanent move. He made his first appearance since his return to the club in a 2–0 home defeat to Scunthorpe United on 23 April 2016.

Tyler agreed a one-year permanent playing contract alongside his role as goalkeeping coach following the appointment of Grant McCann as Peterborough United manager on 16 May 2016. His permanent contract officially began on 8 June 2016, following the expiration of his loan spell. Tyler made five appearances for Peterborough in 2016–17, and signed a two-year contract to become the club's full-time goalkeeping coach at the end of the season, after he was not offered a new playing contract.

On 10 May 2021, Tyler formally announced his retirement from professional football aged 44 after making nearly 800 appearances in his career which lasted 27 years. Tyler will continue to work at Peterborough United as goalkeeping coach.

== International career ==
Tyler played for the England U17 and England U20 teams. He was included in the England U20 squad for the 1997 FIFA World Youth Championship. Tyler was an unused substitute behind first team goalkeeper David Lucas for all of their Group F games, which included a 2–1 win over Ivory Coast U20, a 5–0 win over United Arab Emirates U20, and a 1–0 win over Mexico U20. He was also an unused substitute in a 2–1 quarter-final defeat to Argentina U20.

== Career statistics ==
Appearances and goals by club, season and competition
Club	Season	League			FA Cup		League Cup		Other		Total	
Club	Season	Division	Apps	Goals	Apps	Goals	Apps	Goals	Apps	Goals	Apps	Goals
Peterborough United	1994–95	Second Division	5	0	0	0	0	0	2 (Note: Appearance(s) in Football League Trophy)	0	7	0
Peterborough United	1995–96	Second Division	0	0	0	0	0	0	0	0	0	0
Peterborough United	1996–97	Second Division	3	0	0	0	0	0	1	0	4	0
Peterborough United	1997–98	Third Division	46	0	3	0	4	0	4	0	57	0
Peterborough United	1998–99	Third Division	27	0	1	0	1	0	2	0	31	0
Peterborough United	1999–2000	Third Division	32	0	2	0	2	0	4 (Note: One appearance in Football League Trophy, three in Third Division play-offs)	0	40	0
Peterborough United	2000–01	Second Division	40	0	5	0	2	0	0	0	47	0
Peterborough United	2001–02	Second Division	44	0	6	0	1	0	2	0	53	0
Peterborough United	2002–03	Second Division	29	0	1	0	1	0	1	0	32	0
Peterborough United	2003–04	Second Division	43	0	3	0	1	0	3	0	50	0
Peterborough United	2004–05	League One	46	0	3	0	1	0	1	0	51	0
Peterborough United	2005–06	League Two	40	0	2	0	1	0	1	0	44	0
Peterborough United	2006–07	League Two	41	0	4	0	2	0	2	0	49	0
Peterborough United	2007–08	League Two	17	0	3	0	0	0	1	0	21	0
Peterborough United	2008–09	League One	0	0	0	0	0	0	0	0	0	0
Peterborough United	Total		413	0	33	0	16	0	24	0	486	0
Yeovil Town (loan)	1996–97	Isthmian League Premier Division	4	0	0	0	—		0	0	4	0
Hull City (loan)	2007–08	Championship	0	0	—		—		—		0	0
Watford (loan)	2008–09	Championship	0	0	—		—		—		0	0
Bury (loan)	2008–09	League Two	11	0	—		—		—		11	0
Luton Town	2009–10	Conference Premier	37	0	1	0	—		2 (Note: Appearances in Conference Premier play-offs)	0	40	0
Luton Town	2010–11	Conference Premier	43	0	5	0	—		6 (Note: Three appearances in FA Trophy, three in Conference Premier play-offs)	0	54	0
Luton Town	2011–12	Conference Premier	34	0	0	0	—		10 (Note: Seven appearances in FA Trophy, three in Conference Premier play-offs)	0	44	0
Luton Town	2012–13	Conference Premier	39	0	6	0	—		1 (Note: Appearance in FA Trophy)	0	46	0
Luton Town	2013–14	Conference Premier	46	0	0	0	—		0	0	46	0
Luton Town	2014–15	League Two	31	0	4	0	1	0	0	0	36	0
Luton Town	2015–16	League Two	27	0	1	0	1	0	2	0	31	0
Luton Town	Total		257	0	17	0	2	0	21	0	297	0
Peterborough United (loan)	2015–16	League One	3	0	—		—		—		3	0
Peterborough United	2016–17	League One	3	0	0	0	1	0	1	0	5	0
Peterborough United	2017–18	League One	0	0	0	0	0	0	0	0	0	0
Peterborough United	2018–19	League One	0	0	0	0	0	0	0	0	0	0
Peterborough United	2019–20	League One	0	0	0	0	0	0	0	0	0	0
Peterborough United	2020–21	League One	0	0	0	0	0	0	0	0	0	0
Peterborough United	Total		6	0	0	0	1	0	1	0	8	0
Career total			691	0	50	0	19	0	46	0	806	0

== Honours ==
Peterborough United

- Football League Third Division play-offs: 2000
- Football League Two second-place promotion: 2007–08

Luton Town

- Conference Premier: 2013–14

Individual

- PFA Team of the Year: 2001–02 Second Division
- Luton Town Player of the Season: 2010–11
- Conference Premier Team of the Year: 2011–12, 2013–14
