= Daniel French =

Daniel French may refer to:

- Daniel French (inventor) (1770–1853), American inventor and steamboat pioneer
- Daniel Chester French (1850–1931), American sculptor
- Daniel French (footballer) (born 1979), English footballer
- Dan French (born 1981), American politician
