= Andy Collett =

English footballer

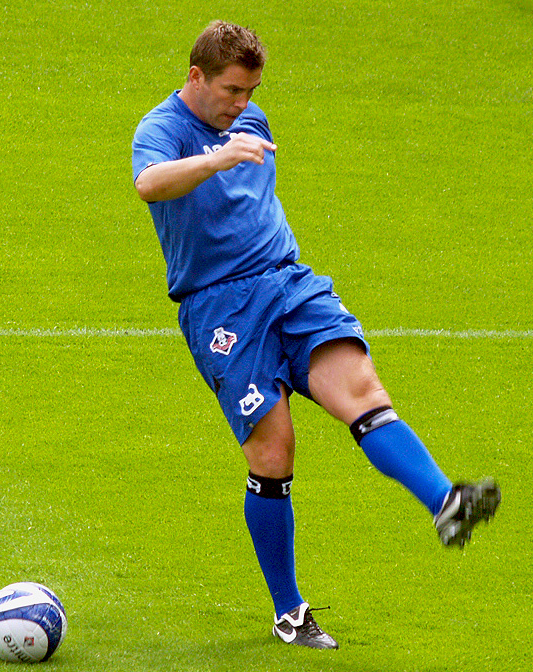
- Collett as a coach at Oldham Athletic in 2009

Personal information
- Full name: Andrew Alfred Collett
- Date of birth: 28 October 1973 (age 53)
- Place of birth: Stockton-on-Tees, England
- Height: 6 ft 0 in (1.83 m)
- Position: Goalkeeper

Youth career
- –1992: Middlesbrough

Senior career*
Years	Team	Apps	(Gls)
1992–1994	Middlesbrough	2	(0)
1994–1999	Bristol Rovers	107	(0)
1999–2004	Darlington	126	(0)
Total		235	(0)
- * Club domestic league appearances and goals

Andrew Alfred Collett (born 28 October 1973) is an English former professional footballer who played as a goalkeeper.

== Career ==
Collett was born in Stockton-on-Tees, County Durham. He began his career at Middlesbrough, for whom he made his first-team debut. He then moved south to Bristol Rovers, where he remained for five years before moving on to Darlington. He stayed at Darlington for five years, before his career was cut short because of a shoulder injury. Collett played a vital role in helping Darlington reach the 2000 Third Division play-off final, where they lost to Peterborough United.

Collett was appointed Darlington's goalkeeping coach after he retired as a player in 2004. On 26 May 2009, he was appointed goalkeeper coach of Oldham Athletic. He rejoined Dave Penney and Martin Gray, who were also amongst the coaching staff of Darlington. Collett joined League One club Hartlepool United as goalkeeping coach on 15 December 2011, but left in June 2013 when his contract was not renewed upon the club's relegation. He soon took up the same position at League Two club York City, before he left in May 2015. Collett returned to York City in 2017 as goalkeeper coach, as well as running a coaching academy in Teesside It was announced that he had left the club on 4 April 2022.
