= Dean Hooper =

English footballer

Personal information
- Full name: Dean Raymond Hooper
- Date of birth: 13 April 1971 (age 55)
- Place of birth: Harefield, England
- Height: 1.80 m (5 ft 11 in)
- Position: Right back

Youth career
- –1991: Brentford

Senior career*
Years	Team	Apps	(Gls)
1991–1992	Marlow		
1992–1993	Yeading		
1993–1994	Chalfont St Peter		
1994–1995	Hayes		
1995–1996	Swindon Town	4	(0)
1995–1996	→ Peterborough United (loan)	4	(0)
1996	Hayes		
1996–1997	Stevenage Borough	29	(2)
1997–1998	Kingstonian	48	(5)
1998–2002	Peterborough United	113	(2)
2002	→ Dagenham & Redbridge (loan)	14	(0)
2002–2004	Aldershot Town	67	(1)
2004–2005	St Albans City	32	(1)
2005–2008	Lewes	34	(0)
2007	→ Cambridge United (loan)	3	(0)

International career
	England National Game XI	1	(0)
- * Club domestic league appearances and goals

Dean Raymond Hooper (born 13 April 1971) is an English retired professional footballer who played as a full back for Swindon Town and Peterborough United in the Football League.

== Career statistics ==
Appearances and goals by club, season and competition
Club	Season	League			FA Cup		League Cup		Other		Total	
Club	Season	Division	Apps	Goals	Apps	Goals	Apps	Goals	Apps	Goals	Apps	Goals
Swindon Town	1994–95	First Division	4	0	0	0	1	0	0	0	5	0
Swindon Town	1995–96	Second Division	0	0	0	0	1	0	2 (Note: Appearances in Football League Trophy)	0	3	0
Swindon Town	Total		4	0	0	0	2	0	2	0	8	0
Peterborough United (loan)	1995–96	Second Division	4	0	0	0	—		—		4	0
Stevenage Borough	1996–97	Conference	21	1	0	0	—		8 (Note: Appearances in FA Trophy)	0	29	1
Kingstonian	1997–98	Isthmian League Premier Division	37	2	4	3	—		7 (Note: 4 appearances in Surrey Senior Cup, 1 appearance in FA Trophy, 1 appearance in Isthmian League Cup, 1 appearance in Isthmian League Full Members' Cup)	0	48	5
Peterborough United	1998–99	Third Division	37	2	1	0	2	0	2 (Note: 1 appearance in Football League Third Division play-offs, 1 appearance in Football League Trophy)	0	42	2
Peterborough United	1999-00	Third Division	30	0	2	0	2	0	1	0	35	0
Peterborough United	2000–01	Second Division	32	0	4	0	2	0	2	0	40	0
Peterborough United	2001–02	Second Division	13	0	4	0	0	0	1	0	18	0
Peterborough United	Total		116	2	11	0	6	0	6	0	139	2
Dagenham & Redbridge (loan)	2001–02	Conference	14	0	—		—		—		14	0
Aldershot Town	2002–03	Isthmian League Premier Division	38	1	0	0	—		0	0	38	1
Aldershot Town	2003–04	Conference	29	0	0	0	—		1 (Note: Appearance in Football Conference play-offs)	0	30	0
Aldershot Town	Total		67	1	0	0	—		1	0	68	1
St Albans City	2004–05	Conference South	32	1	0	0	—		4 (Note: 2 appearances in FA Trophy, 1 appearance in Isthmian League Cup, 1 appearance in Herts Senior Cup)	0	36	1
Lewes	2005–06	Conference South	28	0	0	0	—		0	0	28	0
Lewes	2006–07	Conference South	6	0	1	0	—		0	0	7	0
Lewes	Total		34	0	1	0	—		0	0	35	0
Cambridge United (loan)	2006–07	Conference Premier	3	0	—		—		—		3	0
Career total			328	7	16	3	8	0	28	0	380	10

== Honours ==
Kingstonian

- Isthmian League Premier Division: 1997–98
- Surrey Senior Cup: 1997–98

Aldershot Town

- Isthmian League Premier Division: 2002–03
