= Matt Gill =

English footballer (born 1980)

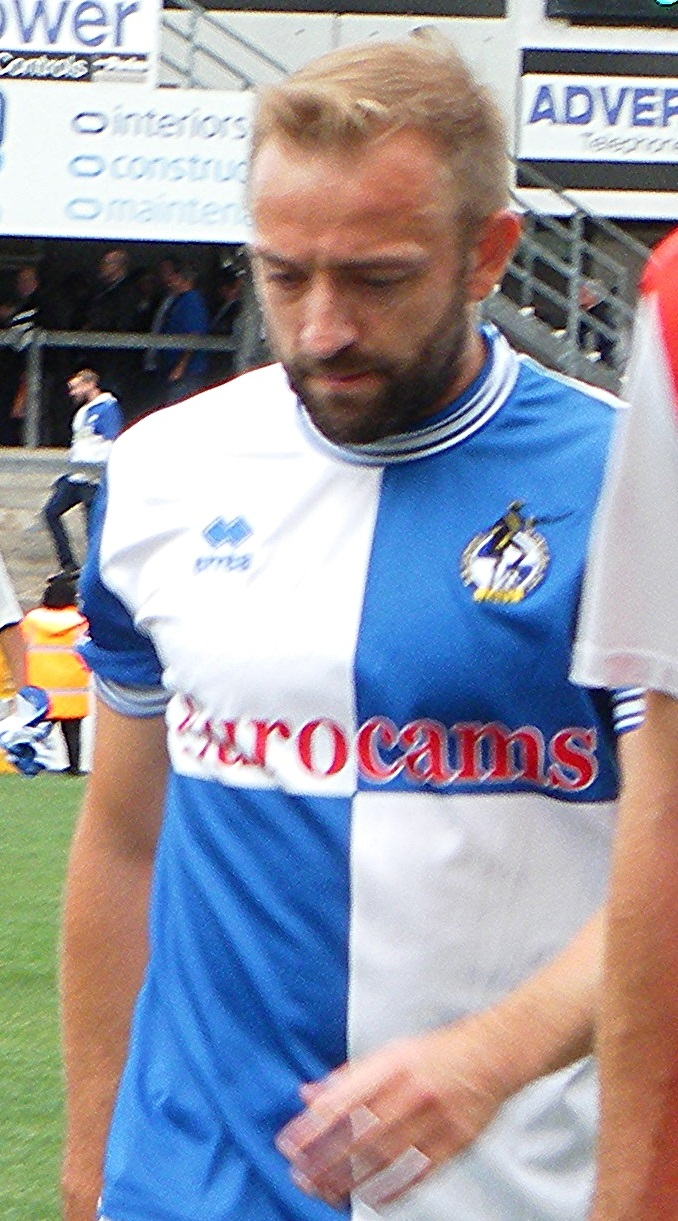
- Gill playing for Bristol Rovers in 2013

Personal information
- Full name: Matthew James Gill
- Date of birth: 8 November 1980 (age 46)
- Place of birth: Chatham, England
- Height: 5 ft 10 in (1.78 m)
- Position: Midfielder

Team information
- Current team: West Bromwich Albion (assistant head coach)

Youth career
- Peterborough United

Senior career*
Years	Team	Apps	(Gls)
1997–2004	Peterborough United	149	(5)
2004–2006	Notts County	57	(0)
2006–2009	Exeter City	148	(14)
2009–2011	Norwich City	12	(0)
2010	→ Peterborough United (loan)	4	(0)
2011	→ Walsall (loan)	8	(2)
2011–2014	Bristol Rovers	45	(0)
2013–2014	→ Exeter City (loan)	24	(0)
2014	Tranmere Rovers	8	(0)
Total		455	(21)

Managerial career
- 2021: Ipswich Town (caretaker)
- * Club domestic league appearances and goals

Matthew James Gill (born 8 November 1980) is an English professional football coach and former player. He is currently assistant head coach of West Bromwich Albion.

He began his career in 1997, notably representing Peterborough United, Exeter City and Bristol Rovers.

Following his retirement in 2014, he moved into coaching, first becoming assistant manager at Tranmere Rovers before taking a post at the Norwich City academy. He left Norwich in October 2018, joining local rivals Ipswich Town as first-team coach to new manager Paul Lambert. Following Lambert's departure in February 2021, Gill was appointed as caretaker manager before Lambert's successor, Paul Cook, was appointed. Gill left the club in May 2021. He briefly joined Russell Martin at Milton Keynes Dons, before the pair moved to Swansea City in August 2021. He followed Martin to Southampton in June 2023 before leaving the club in December 2024.

== Playing career ==
=== Peterborough United ===
Born in Chatham, Kent, Gill began his career as a trainee with Third Division side Peterborough United. On 25 April 1998, during the 1997–98 season, Gill broke through into Peterborough's first team during a 3–1 loss to Torquay United. In over seven years at Peterborough, Gill made 149 first team appearances, scoring five goals.

=== Notts County ===
On 3 May 2004, Gill moved to League Two side Notts County for the 2004–05 season. After a tough start at Meadow Lane, Gill was placed on the transfer list by struggling manager Gary Mills. In November 2004 Mills was replaced by Ian Richardson who immediately removed him from the list. Gill went on to make 57 appearances for the club before being transferred to Conference National side Exeter City on 16 January 2006 during the 2005–06 season, on a free transfer.

=== Exeter City ===
After 18 appearances for the club during the latter half of the 2005–06 season, he signed a new one-year deal in May 2006, and he agreed a new two-year contract in December 2006.

He was sent off in the 2007 Conference National playoff final for a headbutt, becoming the first player to receive the red card at the new Wembley Stadium. He did hold the position of club captain whilst with Exeter, but stepped down from this role in January 2008.

In September 2008, he was voted League Two Player of the Month, after scoring four goals in four games.

=== Norwich City ===
Gill agreed to sign for Norwich City on 9 June 2009 on a free transfer, which came into effect on 1 July. He made his debut in the opening day 7–1 defeat to Colchester United at Carrow Road. Injury blighted Gill's first season at Carrow Road, and he only managed 10 appearances in all competitions. Gill particularly impressed in the 3–0 win over Bristol Rovers on 1 May 2010. He continued his role of a substitute during the 2010–2011 Championship season, making some appearances off the bench, showcasing his long throw-ins to the fans. Gill was released by Norwich on 1 June 2011.

Gill returned to his first club, Peterborough United, on 23 September 2010 on a one-month loan and made his second debut for the Posh at home to MK Dons.

On 21 January 2011, he joined Walsall on a month-long loan. He returned to Norwich at the end of this loan spell, having scored twice in 8 appearances for Walsall, but was released by Norwich at the end of the season.

=== Bristol Rovers ===
Bristol Rovers agreed to sign Gill on 6 June 2011, subject to a medical. On 1 August 2011 it was announced that Gill would be the club captain for Bristol Rovers for the 2011–12 season.

Gill returned to his former club Exeter City on 18 October 2013 on loan until the end of the year.

=== Tranmere Rovers ===
Gill signed for League Two outfit Tranmere Rovers on 29 May 2014 on a one-year contract. He signed as a player-coach as Tranmere's second signing by new manager, Rob Edwards. He became assistant manager in September, after assistant manager John McMahon left the club. Manager Edwards was sacked in October, and though Micky Adams was quickly appointed as manager, Gill took caretaker charge of the club for one game. Gill left his role at the club on 3 November, claiming that "[myself and Adams] both feel that it's in my best interests for me to have a fresh start". He made 10 appearances in all competitions whilst with Tranmere.

== Coaching career ==
=== Norwich City ===
After leaving Tranmere, he began scouting for Norwich City during the 2014–15 season. From the 2015–16 season he worked with Norwich's Academy as a coach. He took on the interim role of Norwich's Under-23 manager for the remainder of the 2016–17 season following the exit of Dmitri Halajko, who left to become head of technical coaching at Leicester City's academy in February. Gill's role was confirmed as being permanent on 4 July 2017.

=== Ipswich Town ===
On 27 October 2018, Gill left his role at Norwich to join local rivals Ipswich Town as first team coach as part of Paul Lambert's new backroom staff. Following Lambert's departure by mutual consent in February 2021, Gill was appointed as caretaker manager with fellow club coach Bryan Klug as his assistant. Gill oversaw one game while in caretaker charge, a 2–1 away win at Accrington Stanley, before new boss Paul Cook was appointed. It was confirmed that Gill would remain as a first team coach under Cook, alongside fellow coach Gary Roberts. However, on 7 May 2021, Gill left the club after Cook outlined his intentions of appointing a new backroom ahead of forthcoming season.

=== MK Dons ===
Gill joined up with Russell Martin at Milton Keynes Dons on 29 June 2021. He was handed the role of technical development coach at Stadium MK.

=== Swansea City ===
Russell Martin and his MK Dons coaching staff, including Gill, left to join Swansea City in August 2021 with Gill serving as technical development coach. He held this role until February 2022, where following the departure of Luke Williams, Gill became the interim assistant head coach at the swans. During pre season preparations ahead of the 2022–23 season, Gill was promoted to assistant head coach permanently.

=== Southampton ===
On 27 June 2023, it was confirmed that Gill had joined Martin's backroom staff at Southampton as an assistant head coach. Gill left the club on 15 December 2024 following the sacking of Martin.

=== Rangers ===
On 5 June 2025, Gill joined Martin at Scottish Premiership club Rangers as assistant head coach. The duo departed the club in October 2025 after seventeen matches.

=== West Bromwich Albion ===
In March 2026, Gill joined the coaching staff of West Bromwich Albion as technical coach, assisting interim manager James Morrison. Following Morrison's permanent appointment at the end of the 2025–26 season, Gill was confirmed to be remaining with the club as assistant head coach.

== Career statistics ==
Appearances and goals by club, season and competition
Club	Season	League			FA Cup		League Cup		Other (Note: Football League Trophy matches except marked.)		Total	
Club	Season	Division	Apps	Goals	Apps	Goals	Apps	Goals	Apps	Goals	Apps	Goals
Peterborough United	1997–98	Third Division	2	0	—		—		—		2	0
Peterborough United	1998–99	Third Division	26	0	—		2	0	1	0	29	0
Peterborough United	1999–2000	Third Division	20	1	1	0	—		3 (Note: Appearances in Football League Trophy and Third Division play-offs)	0	24	1
Peterborough United	2000–01	Second Division	16	1	3	0	—		1	0	20	1
Peterborough United	2001–02	Second Division	12	2	—		—		—		12	2
Peterborough United	2002–03	Second Division	41	1	1	0	1	0	—		43	1
Peterborough United	2003–04	Second Division	32	0	2	0	1	0	2	0	37	0
Peterborough United	Total		149	5	7	0	4	0	7	0	167	5
Notts County	2004–05	League Two	43	0	4	0	2	0	1	0	50	0
Notts County	2004–05	League Two	14	0	1	0	1	0	—		16	0
Notts County	Total		57	0	5	0	3	0	1	0	66	0
Exeter City	2005–06	Conference	16	1	—		—		2	0	18	1
Exeter City	2006–07	Conference	46	1	1	0	—		3 (Note: Appearances in Conference National play-offs)	0	50	1
Exeter City	2007–08	Conference	42	3	2	0	—		5 (Note: Appearances in FA Trophy)	0	50	3
Exeter City	2008–09	League Two	43	9	1	0	1	0	1	0	46	9
Exeter City	Total		148	14	4	0	1	0	11	0	164	14
Norwich City	2009–10	League One	8	0	—		1	0	1	0	10	0
Norwich City	2010–11	Championship	4	0	—		2	0	—		6	0
Norwich City	Total		12	0	0	0	3	0	1	0	16	0
Peterborough United (loan)	2010–11	League One	4	0	—		—		—		4	0
Walsall (loan)	2010–11	League One	8	2	—		—		—		8	2
Bristol Rovers	2011–12	League Two	33	0	—		2	0	1	0	36	0
Bristol Rovers	2012–13	League Two	11	0	—		1	0	1	0	13	0
Bristol Rovers	2013–14	League Two	1	0	—		—		—		1	0
Bristol Rovers	Total		45	0	0	0	3	0	2	0	50	0
Exeter City (loan)	2013–14	League Two	24	0	1	0	—		—		25	0
Tranmere Rovers	2014–15	League Two	8	0	—		1	0	1	0	10	0
Career total			455	21	17	0	15	0	23	0	510	21

== Managerial statistics ==
As of match played 2 March 2021

Managerial record by team and tenure
Team	From	To	Record					
Team	From	To	G	W	D	L	Win %	Ref.
Ipswich Town	28 February 2021	2 March 2021	1	1	0	0	100.00	
Total			1	1	0	0	100.00	—

== Honours ==
Peterborough United

- Football League Third Division play-offs: 2000

Exeter City

- Conference Premier play-offs: 2008

Norwich City

- Football League One: 2009–10

Individual

- Football League Two Player of the Month: September 2008
