= Steve Castle =

English footballer and manager

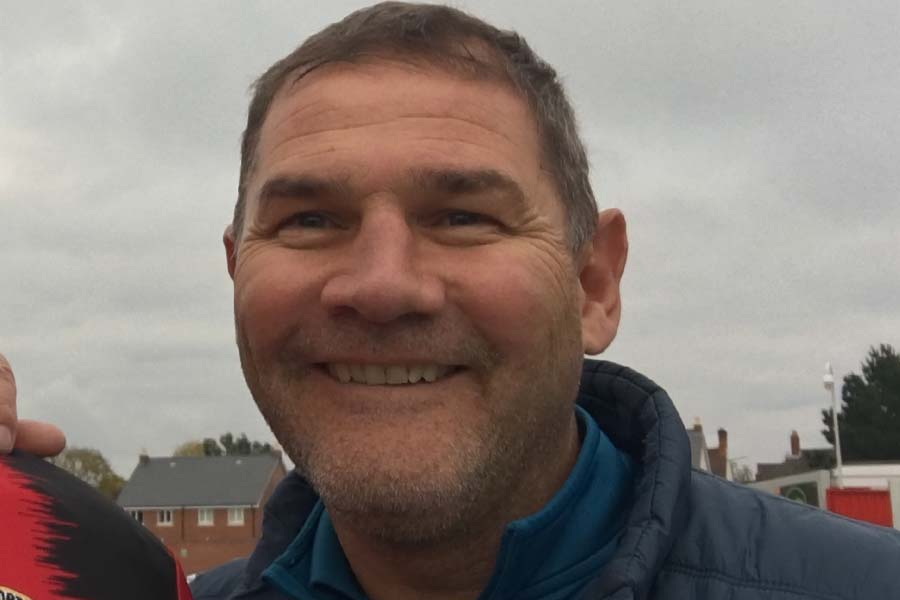
- Castle in October 2020

Personal information
- Full name: Stephen Charles Castle
- Date of birth: 17 May 1966 (age 60)
- Place of birth: Barkingside, England
- Height: 5 ft 11 in (1.80 m)
- Position: Midfielder

Team information
- Current team: Bishop's Stortford (manager)

Youth career
- Tottenham Hotspur
- 1982–1984: Leyton Orient

Senior career*
Years	Team	Apps	(Gls)
1984–1992	Leyton Orient	243	(55)
1992–1995	Plymouth Argyle	101	(35)
1995–1997	Birmingham City	23	(1)
1996	→ Gillingham (loan)	6	(1)
1997	→ Leyton Orient (loan)	4	(1)
1997–2000	Peterborough United	105	(20)
2000–2001	Leyton Orient	13	(0)
2001–2002	Stevenage Borough	6	(0)
2002–2004	St Albans City	49	(3)
Total		550	(117)

Managerial career
- 2008–2011: St Albans City
- 2011–2013: Takeley
- 2013–2023: Royston Town
- 2024–: Bishop's Stortford
- * Club domestic league appearances and goals

Steven Castle (born 17 May 1966) is an English football manager and former player who is currently the manager of Bishop's Stortford. From 2013 to 2023, he was the manager of Royston Town. As a player, he spent most of his career playing as a midfielder.

== Playing career ==
Castle played in the Football League between 1984 and 2001. He played for Leyton Orient in three separate spells, amassing a total of 322 appearances for them. Castle's combative style attracted the attention of Liverpool boss Kenny Dalglish and Wimbledon manager Bobby Gould. Castle explains the Wimbledon approach and discusses his early career in detail in an interview recorded early in 2020. Castle was named in the PFA Third division team of the year for the 1990/91 season. A Twitter poll in 2014 saw Castle voted as Orient's greatest ever captain.

He also played League football with Plymouth Argyle, Birmingham City, Gillingham and Peterborough United.

Plymouth Argyle boss Peter Shilton was seeking a midfield general to rally his new-look squad following relegation from the second tier in 1992. On the advice of a scout, he took in a game at Brisbane Road and left at half-time, instructing Argyle director Denis Angilley to start negotiations as he had "seen enough" of his target. A£225,000 transfer fee duly paid, Castle headed to Home Park and was promptly injured in a pre-season friendly. Argyle fans would have to wait until late October to see their new midfield marvel in meaningful action, but it turned out to be well worth the wait. He scored on his debut in a 2–0 victory against Wigan Athletic, and by season's end had notched up 12 more. He continued in a similar vein the following season as Argyle marched to the playoffs, bagging 16 goals by Christmas and eventually ending the campaign with 22. The undisputed highlight of his Argyle career (and one of his own personal highlights, incidentally) was a record-breaking hat-trick in a fine 3–2 win at Stockport County in December 1993. His three goals in six second-half minutes were an astonishing feat and one that confirmed his place as a firm favourite of the fans. Indeed, 'Super Stevie Castle' became Home Park's undisputed golden boy thanks to his barnstorming, all-action style and a left foot that developed an intimate relationship with the back of the net. Castle was named alongside his midfield partner Steve McCall in the all-time Argyle XI in a poll taken on the club's website in 2011. He was named in the PFA Second division team of the year for the 1993/94 season before transferring to Birmingham City in 1995.

Castle joined Peterborough United on a free transfer as player-coach for the 1997–98 season, and over the next three seasons he played 122 senior matches and scored 20 goals winning the play-off final at Wembley in his final game. He moved to Leyton Orient on a free for 2000/01. In his final season at Orient Castle gained his UEFA 'A' coaching licence. Castle retired due to a persistent knee injury.

== Managerial career ==
In September 2006 he became assistant manager to Jimmy Quinn at Cambridge United.

=== Royston Town ===
On 13 December 2013 he became Royston Town manager with his first game in charge being the Boxing Day home fixture against top of the table Dunstable Town. After over 10 years in charge, Castle departed on 19 December 2023.

== Honours ==
Leyton Orient

- Football League Fourth Division play-offs: 1989

Peterborough United

- Football League Third Division play-offs: 2000

Individual

- PFA Team of the Year: 1990–91 Third Division, 1993–94 Second Division
