= Anders Koogi =

Danish footballer (born 1979)

Personal information
- Full name: Anders Koogi
- Date of birth: 8 September 1979 (age 47)
- Place of birth: Roskilde, Denmark
- Position: Midfielder

Senior career*
Years	Team	Apps	(Gls)
1996–1997	Norwich City	0	(0)
1997–2002	Peterborough United	2	(0)
2002	Cambridge City		
- * Club domestic league appearances and goals

Anders Koogi (born 8 September 1979) is a Danish footballer who played in The Football League for Peterborough United.
