= Bart Griemink =

Dutch footballer

Personal information
- Date of birth: 29 March 1972 (age 54)
- Place of birth: Oss, Netherlands
- Height: 1.93 m (6 ft 4 in)
- Position: Goalkeeper

Senior career*
Years	Team	Apps	(Gls)
1990–1992	Emmen	37	(0)
1992–1994	Willem II	4	(0)
1994–1995	WKE		
1995–1996	Birmingham City	20	(0)
1996	→ Barnsley (loan)	0	(0)
1996–2000	Peterborough United	60	(0)
2000	→ Swindon Town (loan)	4	(0)
2000–2004	Swindon Town	120	(0)
2004–2006	Southend United	22	(0)
2006–2008	Boston Town	38	(0)
Total		305	(0)
- * Club domestic league appearances and goals

Bart Griemink (born 29 March 1972) is a Dutch former professional football goalkeeper.

He played in the Football League with Birmingham City, Barnsley, Peterborough United, Swindon Town and Southend United. He then played for Boston Town in the United Counties League for two seasons.

== Honours ==
Peterborough United

- Football League Third Division play-offs: 2000

Southend United

- Football League Two play-offs: 2005
