= Matthew Hann =

English footballer

Personal information
- Full name: Matthew John Hann
- Date of birth: 6 September 1980 (age 46)
- Place of birth: Saffron Walden, England
- Position: Midfielder

Senior career*
Years	Team	Apps	(Gls)
1997–1998	Cambridge United	0	(0)
1998–2001	Peterborough United	4	(0)
2000	→ Stamford (loan)		
2001	→ Bishop's Stortford (loan)		
2001	→ Cambridge City (loan)		
2001–2002	Cambridge City		
2002–2004	Dorchester Town		
2004–	St Albans City	88	(19)
2008–2010	Sutton United	95	(8)
- * Club domestic league appearances and goals as of 28 December 2006

Matthew John Hann (born 6 September 1980) is an English former footballer who played as a midfielder. He played for Cambridge United, Peterborough United, Cambridge City, Eastleigh, Dorchester Town and St Albans City as well as having loan spells with Stamford and Bishop's Stortford. He plays mainly on the right side of midfield, but can also play as a striker. He was sold to Eastleigh in 2007 when new St Albans City boss Ritchie Hanlon was unimpressed by him.

In 2008, Hann was one of the first signings of Paul Doswell at Sutton United. Doswell was Hann's Manager at Eastleigh. Hann played for 2 seasons, and scored the winning goal to send Sutton United into the first round of the FA Cup in 2008 for the first time since 1995. His second season for Sutton was blighted by injury and he announced his retirement at the end of the 2009–10 season. His last game for Sutton United was as an unused substitute in the Isthmian League match at home to Hendon on 27 March 2010.

Hann attended Bournemouth University, where he graduated with a BA Business Studies.
