= Andy Edwards (footballer, born 1971) =

English footballer (born 1971)

Personal information
- Full name: Andrew David Edwards
- Date of birth: 17 September 1971 (age 55)
- Place of birth: Epping, Essex, England
- Height: 6 ft 3 in (1.91 m)
- Position: Central defender

Youth career
- –: West Ham United

Senior career*
Years	Team	Apps	(Gls)
1989–1995	Southend United	147	(5)
1995–1996	Birmingham City	40	(1)
1996–2003	Peterborough United	267	(10)
2003–2004	Rushden & Diamonds	41	(4)
2004–2006	Southend United	32	(1)
2006	→ Grays Athletic (loan)	5	(0)
2006–2007	Aldershot Town	17	(0)
Total		549	(21)

Managerial career
- 2016: Leyton Orient (caretaker)
- 2016–2017: Leyton Orient
- 2021–2022: England U20
- * Club domestic league appearances and goals

Andrew David Edwards (born 17 September 1971) is an English former professional footballer and manager, currently working as an assistant coach at Notts County.

During his playing career he achieved six promotions and played for a number of clubs, including Southend United, Birmingham City, Peterborough United, Rushden & Diamonds, Grays Athletic and Aldershot Town. He was manager of Leyton Orient before joining the FA in 2017.

== Playing career ==
Edwards started his career as a schoolboy at West Ham United before signing scholarship forms at Southend United in 1988. He made his debut as a 17-year-old against Wigan Athletic in the same year.

After signing as a professional with the "Shrimpers" in 1989, Edwards enjoyed successive promotions to the second tier of English football and enjoyed five years at that level before being transferred to Birmingham City in July 1995 for a fee of £450,000.

At Birmingham, Edwards was part of the side that reached a League Cup semi-final before being transferred in November 1996 to Peterborough United. Edwards went on to captain the side to promotion at Wembley in 2000.

He joined Rushden & Diamonds in March 2003 and played a part in their promotion to the Second Division as champions. Edwards scored the goal against Carlisle United that saw the club seal promotion.

After leaving Nene Park in the summer of 2004, Edwards re-joined Southend United and again enjoyed successive promotions as the club went from League Two to the Championship. After a loan spell with Conference club Grays Athletic, where he was on the bench as they won the 2005–06 FA Trophy, he left Roots Hall in 2006 and joined Aldershot Town, but injury ended his career in January 2007.

== Coaching career ==
Following his retirement, Edwards moved into coaching, with spells as assistant manager at St Albans City and as a coach within the Arsenal Academy. He joined Leyton Orient as youth team manager in 2009, which "evolved into the role of academy director" in 2011. He and Kevin Dearden assisted Kevin Nugent during Nugent's brief tenure as manager. Edwards was appointed permanent manager on 23 November 2016 following the departure of Alberto Cavasin.

Edwards left Orient for a role with the Football Association on 29 January 2017 as an out-of-possession coach working with England's development teams. He was a staff member with the England under-20 team that won the 2017 FIFA U-20 World Cup in South Korea, and went on to work with the U19s in preparation for the 2018 European Championships.

On 26 August 2021, Edwards was appointed as head coach of England U20s for the forthcoming autumn internationals. He was succeeded by Ian Foster on 16 August 2022.

On 22 June 2025, Edwards was appointed as assistant head coach at Notts County, joining the staff of newly appointed head coach Martin Paterson and becoming a member of the club's newly-formed Technical Board.

== Managerial statistics ==
As of match played 28 January 2017

Managerial record by team and tenure
Team	From	To	Record							
Team	From	To	G	W	D	L	GF	GA	GD	Win %
Leyton Orient (caretaker)	26 September 2016	2 October 2016	2	0	1	1	0	2	−2	0.00
Leyton Orient	23 November 2016	29 January 2017	9	2	1	6	8	18	−10	22.22
Total			11	2	2	7	8	20	−12	18.18

== Honours ==
Peterborough United

- Football League Third Division play-offs: 2000

Rushden & Diamonds

- Football League Third Division: 2002–03

Southend United

- Football League One: 2005–06
- Football League Two play-offs: 2005
- Football League Trophy runner-up: 2004–05
