= Gareth Jelleyman =

Welsh footballer

Personal information
- Full name: Gareth Anthony Jelleyman
- Date of birth: 14 November 1980 (age 45)
- Place of birth: Holywell, Wales
- Height: 5 ft 10 in (1.78 m)
- Position: Defender

Senior career*
Years	Team	Apps	(Gls)
1998–2005	Peterborough United	104	(0)
1998	→ Boston United (loan)	2	(0)
2004	→ Boston United (loan)	3	(0)
2005	→ Mansfield Town (loan)	1	(0)
2005–2008	Mansfield Town	126	(1)
2008–2009	Rushden & Diamonds	17	(0)
2009	→ Barrow (loan)	9	(0)
2009	AFC Telford United	6	(0)
2009–2010	Barrow	26	(0)
2010–2013	Boston United	70	(0)
2013–2014	Corby Town	11	(0)
2014–2015	Stamford		

International career
	Wales U21	2	(2)
- * Club domestic league appearances and goals

Gareth Jelleyman (born 14 November 1980) is a Welsh former footballer who played as a defender.

He has previously played for Peterborough United, Boston United, Mansfield Town, Rushden & Diamonds and Barrow. Jelleyman is a left-sided player who usually plays at left-back, however he has also occasionally been used in midfield.

== Career ==
Born in Holywell, Jelleyman began his career as a trainee with Peterborough United in 1998. He had a short spell on loan at Boston United in 1998, before breaking into the first team at age 19 during the 1999–00 season, and was called up to the Welsh Under-21 squad for the match against Belarus in September 2000. In August 2004, Jelleyman joined Boston United on a one-month loan with a view to a permanent deal, but returned to Peterborough before being released on a free transfer and joining Mansfield Town in January 2005. In six seasons at Peterborough United, he made 122 appearances in all competitions. Including the 2000 play off final against Darlington on a very wet evening. it's fair to say the young man got both heads wet that night. Jelleyman signed a new one-year contract at Mansfield Town in June 2007 with manager Billy Dearden describing him as having "...probably been one of my top three players since I came to the club...". By the end of the 2007–08 season, Jelleyman had made over 140 appearances in all competitions for Mansfield. After Mansfield Town were relegated to the Football Conference at the end of the 2007–08 season, he was out of contract but was offered new terms by the club.

In July 2008, Jelleyman signed for Conference National outfit Rushden & Diamonds until the end of the 2008–09 season. After a loan spell in 2009 at Barrow Jelleyman signed for Conference North team AFC Telford United in July. He made his debut in Telford's Shropshire Senior Cup final victory against Shrewsbury Town, but returned to Barrow in the Conference National on 28 August. He spent the full season with Barrow, but was released in May 2010. In July, he re-joined Boston United for a third spell at York Street. On 22 February 2013 Jelleyman was released by United, signing for Corby Town.

== In popular culture ==
Jelleyman's name is homophonic with jelly. The subject of numerous jokes, this most notably appeared on Sky Sports' Soccer Saturday, in which presenter Jeff Stelling said: "Oh no! Gareth Jelleyman's been sent off at Oxford. Let's hope he hasn't thrown a wobbly.", a vernacular expression for losing your temper which also relates to the consistency of jelly. Stelling's April 2009 book discussing his time on Soccer Saturday was entitled Jelleyman's thrown a wobbly.

== Honours ==
Peterborough United

- Football League Third Division play-offs: 2000
