= Richard Scott (footballer) =

English footballer

Personal information
- Full name: Richard Paul Scott
- Date of birth: 29 September 1974 (age 52)
- Place of birth: Kingswinford, England
- Positions: Defender; midfielder

Youth career
- 1991–1993: Birmingham City

Senior career*
Years	Team	Apps	(Gls)
1993–1995	Birmingham City	12	(0)
1995–1998	Shrewsbury Town	105	(18)
1998–2001	Peterborough United	81	(7)
2001–2002	Telford United	29	(1)
2002	Stevenage Borough	5	(0)
2002–2004	Peterborough United	16	(1)
2004	→ Stevenage Borough (loan)		
2004	Stevenage Borough		
2004–2005	Cambridge City	50	(5)
2005	→ Moor Green (loan)		
2005–2007	Moor Green		
2006	→ Bromsgrove Rovers (loan)	2	(1)
2007–2008	Corby Town		
2008	Rugby Town	22	(0)
2009–	Spalding United		

Managerial career
- 2009–: Spalding United (player-manager)
- * Club domestic league appearances and goals

Richard Paul Scott (born 29 September 1974) is an English professional footballer who made more than 200 appearances in the Football League playing for Birmingham City, Shrewsbury Town and Peterborough United. He played as a defender or midfielder.

== Career ==
Scott joined Birmingham City as a YTS trainee in 1991, and turned professional in May 1993. He made his debut in the Second Division (third tier) on 6 April 1993 in a 1–1 draw at home to Derby County. He played six league games during the 1993–94 season, five the season after, plus seven in cup competitions, but was released in March 1995 and joined Shrewsbury Town. He spent three full seasons with the club, playing 105 league games in Divisions Two and Three, then signed for Peterborough United. In the 1999–2000 season, he helped the club to promotion from the Third Division via the play-offs. At the end of the next season, Scott rejected the offer of a new contract and left the club on a free transfer under the Bosman ruling. After 18 months in non-League football with Telford United and Stevenage Borough, Scott rejoined Peterborough for another 18 months before returning to non-league football for good. He spent a second spell at Stevenage, then played for Cambridge City, Moor Green (initially on loan), Bromsgrove Rovers, Corby Town, Rugby Town, where he acted as player-assistant manager, and Spalding United.

Scott was appointed player-manager of Spalding United in November 2009.

Scott is a UEFA B-licensed coach; in 2009, he was running a soccer school for children.

== Honours ==
Shrewsbury Town

- Football League Trophy runner-up: 1995–96

Peterborough United

- Football League Third Division play-offs: 2000
