= Francis Green (footballer) =

English footballer (born 1980)

Personal information
- Full name: Francis James Green
- Date of birth: 25 April 1980 (age 46)
- Place of birth: Nottingham, England
- Height: 5 ft 9 in (1.75 m)
- Position: Striker

Youth career
- 1997–1998: Ilkeston Town

Senior career*
Years	Team	Apps	(Gls)
1998–2003	Peterborough United	108	(14)
2003	→ Lincoln City (loan)	1	(0)
2003–2006	Lincoln City	99	(18)
2005–2006	→ Boston United (loan)	6	(1)
2006–2007	Boston United	39	(4)
2007–2009	Macclesfield Town	65	(14)
2009–2010	Kettering Town	20	(4)
2009	→ Oxford United (loan)	4	(0)
2010	Oxford United	10	(3)
2010	Brackley Town	0	(0)
2011–2012	→ Hucknall Town (loan)		
2012	Eastwood Town	10	(5)
2012	Ilkeston	5	(1)
2012–2013	Spalding United		
2012–2013	Hucknall Town		
2012–2013	Corby Town	3	(1)
2013	Basford United		
- * Club domestic league appearances and goals as of 01:09, 5 October 2016 (UTC)

Francis James Green (born 25 April 1980) is an English former professional footballer and former sports co-commentator for BBC Radio Cambridgeshire. Green is now a full time financial trader and founder of Ten Wealth Group.

As a player he was a striker who played from 1998 to 2013 notably in the Football League for Peterborough United and Lincoln City. He also played professionally for Boston United, Macclesfield Town and Oxford United. He played in Non-League for Kettering Town, Brackley Town, Hucknall Town, Eastwood Town, Ilkeston, Spalding United, Corby Town and Basford United.

== Career ==
Born in Nottingham, Green began his career at Ilkeston Town under the management of Keith Alexander, before going to Peterborough United. He made over 100 appearances for the Posh, before linking up with his former Ilkeston boss, Alexander, at Lincoln City in 2003. He left Lincoln in August 2006 to join Boston United (who he had joined on loan during the previous season). However, he could not prevent the Pilgrims suffering relegation from League Two at the end of the 2006–07 season. Green then left York Street in June 2007 to join Macclesfield Town on a two-year contract, where he again linked up with Alexander for the third time.

In July 2009, Green joined Conference National side Kettering Town, only to join Oxford United on loan in November 2009. This move was then made permanent in January 2010, though he was released shortly after the club secured promotion to the Football League in May of the same year.

In November 2011 he joined Hucknall Town on loan, with a view to making the transfer permanent when the transfer window opened in January 2012. However, in January, he instead joined Eastwood Town. At the end of March, with Eastwood facing financial problems, he opted to join Ilkeston on non-contract terms. He made seven appearances for the Robins in all competitions, helping the team achieve promotion from the Northern Premier League Division One South via the playoffs.

In June 2012, Green joined Spalding United and would score twice on his debut, a 4–2 home United Counties League Premier Division victory over A.F.C. Kempston Rovers on 18 August, but in early November was released from his contract. He moved on to join Hucknall Town but marked his debut by fracturing his fibula in the club's 5–0 Northern Premier League Division One South home defeat to Kidsgrove Athletic on 17 November 2012. Returning to fitness, Green joined Corby Town on 25 January 2013 and, having come on as a substitute, made a goalscoring debut for the club in their 6–1 Conference North defeat at Harrogate Town four days later.

On 28 October 2013, Basford United announced that Green had signed for the club.

== Media career ==
Green now works as a co-commentator for BBC Radio Cambridgeshire on Peterborough United games.

== Honours ==
Peterborough United

- Football League Third Division play-offs: 2000
