= Matt Wicks =

English footballer

Personal information
- Full name: Matthew Jonathan Wicks
- Date of birth: 8 September 1978 (age 48)
- Place of birth: Reading, England
- Height: 6 ft 2 in (1.88 m)
- Position: Central defender

Youth career
- 1994–1995: Arsenal
- 1995–1996: Manchester United
- 1996–1998: Arsenal

Senior career*
Years	Team	Apps	(Gls)
1998–1999	Crewe Alexandra	7	(0)
1999–2000	Peterborough United	31	(0)
2000	→ Brighton & Hove Albion (loan)	7	(3)
2000–2002	Brighton & Hove Albion	19	(1)
2002–2003	Hull City	14	(0)
2003	Newcastle United Jets	0	(0)
Total		78	(4)

International career
- England U17
- * Club domestic league appearances and goals

Matthew Jonathan Wicks (born 8 September 1978) is an English former professional footballer who played as a central defender.

Wicks was viewed as "one of the most promising players of his generation" but never lived up to the label.

== Club career ==
Born in Reading, Wicks began his career with youth contracts at both Arsenal and Manchester United, but failed to make a league appearance for either team. After being released by Arsenal in 1998, Wicks signed for Crewe Alexandra, where he made six league appearances. Wicks later signed for Peterborough United, making a total of 31 league appearances. While at Peterborough, Wicks spent a loan spell with Brighton & Hove Albion, and later signed for Brighton on a permanent deal. In his two spells at Brighton, he made 26 league appearances. After leaving Brighton, Wicks signed for Hull City, where he made 14 league appearances. After leaving Hull in July 2002, Wicks moved to Australia to play with the Newcastle United Jets, under the management of former Norwich City player Ian Crook, but never appeared for the club. He was released from his contract in August 2003 on compassionate grounds because of the illness of a relative, and retired from football soon afterwards.

== International career ==
Wicks was captain of the England national under-17 football team.

== Personal life ==
Wicks is the son of fellow footballer Steve Wicks and grandson of former Chelsea F.C. chairman Brian Mears.

== Honours ==
Peterborough United

- Football League Third Division play-offs: 2000

Brighton & Hove Albion

- Football League Third Division: 2000–01
