= Dan Connor (footballer) =

Irish footballer & coach (born 1981)

Personal information
- Full name: Daniel Brian Connor
- Date of birth: 31 January 1981 (age 45)
- Place of birth: Dublin, Ireland
- Height: 1.88 m (6 ft 2 in)
- Position: Goalkeeper

Senior career*
Years	Team	Apps	(Gls)
1998–2003	Peterborough United	8	(0)
2003–2005	Waterford United	64	(1)
2005–2008	Drogheda United	57	(0)
2009	Cork City	31	(0)
2010	St Patrick's Athletic	5	(0)
2010–2013	Hereford United	2	(0)
Total		167	(1)

International career
2003	Republic of Ireland U21	7	(0)
2007	Republic of Ireland B	1	(0)

Managerial career
- 2024: Forest Green Rovers (caretaker manager)
- * Club domestic league appearances and goals

Daniel Connor (born 31 January 1981) is an Irish retired football goalkeeper who is an assistant coach at Forest Green Rovers and Republic of Ireland U21.

Connor was one of the more experienced goalkeepers in the league, having previously played for Peterborough United, Waterford United and Drogheda United. He also represented the Republic of Ireland at both U21 and B level, making his U21 debut in Buckley Park in June 2003 against Georgia.

While with Waterford United he scored the winning goal in the FAI Cup semi-final in 2004.

Following his release from Drogheda United at the end of the 2008 season, it was confirmed on 23 January 2009 that Connor had signed for Cork City, where he linked up with former Drogheda manager Paul Doolin.

Connor signed for St Patrick's Athletic at the start of the 2010 League of Ireland season, but on 1 July 2010 it was announced that he had signed for Hereford United on a two-year deal. His first season with the Bulls was, however, ruined by a hip injury that ruled him out of the majority of the season. Despite battling long and hard to overcome this injury Connor was forced to retire from playing in August 2011. Following the departure of Russell Hoult, Connor was announced as Hereford's new goalkeeping coach on 12 June 2012.

He left his role as goalkeeping coach with Hereford on 6 June 2013.

The following month he joined the coaching staff at Midland Alliance side Westfields before coming out of retirement to register as a player in November 2013.

Connor combined his work at Westfields with the role of Head of Academy Goalkeeping at Shrewsbury Town.

He was announced as joining Wigan Athletic as an under-8 to under-21 goalkeeping coach on 6 February 2014.

In January 2017 he was promoted by Wigan manager Warren Joyce to the role of senior goalkeeping coach.

In 2019, Connor joined Forest Green Rovers as goalkeeping coach working with manager Mark Cooper. During the 2023–24 season, he stepped up to the role of assistant coach under Steve Cotterill. He has been retained as an assistant coach for the 2025–26 season by the club's manager Robbie Savage.

== Honours ==
Waterford United

- League of Ireland First Division: 2002–03

Drogheda United

- League of Ireland Premier Division: 2007
- FAI Cup: 2005
- Setanta Sports Cup: 2006, 2007
