= Grant Haley (footballer) =

English footballer

Personal information
- Date of birth: 20 September 1979 (age 47)
- Place of birth: Bristol, England
- Height: 1.73 m (5 ft 8 in)
- Position: Right back

Youth career
- Norwich City
- –1997: Peterborough United

Senior career*
Years	Team	Apps	(Gls)
1997–2001	Peterborough United	1	(0)
2000	→ Bedford Town (loan)		
2001–2002	Bedford Town	0	(0)
2014–2015	Ross Handling	10	(9)
- * Club domestic league appearances and goals

Grant Haley (born 20 September 1979) in Bristol, England, is an English retired professional footballer who played as a defender for Peterborough United in the Football League.

== Playing career ==
Haley joined Norwich City aged 11, before transferring to Peterborough's youth academy at the age of 14.

He made his Peterborough debut against Southend United on 23 October 1999, and was man-of-the-match. However, he failed to make another first team appearance for the club, and joined non-League club Bedford Town on loan in 2000, before joining them permanently in 2001, also working in accounts.
