= Tony Shields =

Northern Ireland footballer

Personal information
- Full name: Anthony Shields
- Date of birth: 4 June 1980 (age 46)
- Place of birth: Strabane, Northern Ireland
- Height: 5 ft 8 in (1.73 m)
- Position: Midfielder

Team information
- Current team: Finn Harps

Youth career
- Omagh Town
- Norwich City

Senior career*
Years	Team	Apps	(Gls)
1997–2004	Peterborough United	123	(3)
2002	→ Stevenage Borough (loan)	2	(0)
2003	→ Aldershot Town (loan)	7	(0)
2004	Aldershot Town	6	(0)
2004–2005	Omagh Town	26	(4)
2005–2007	Limavady United	36	(2)
2007–2008	Finn Harps	43	(1)
2008–2009	Coleraine	14	(1)
2009–2010	Institute	10	(1)
2010–2011	Finn Harps	6	(0)

International career
- Republic of Ireland U21
- * Club domestic league appearances and goals

Anthony Shields (born 4 June 1980) in Strabane, Northern Ireland is an Irish professional footballer who played as a midfielder for Finn Harps. He played for Peterborough United in the Football League.
