= Howard Forinton =

English footballer (born 1975)

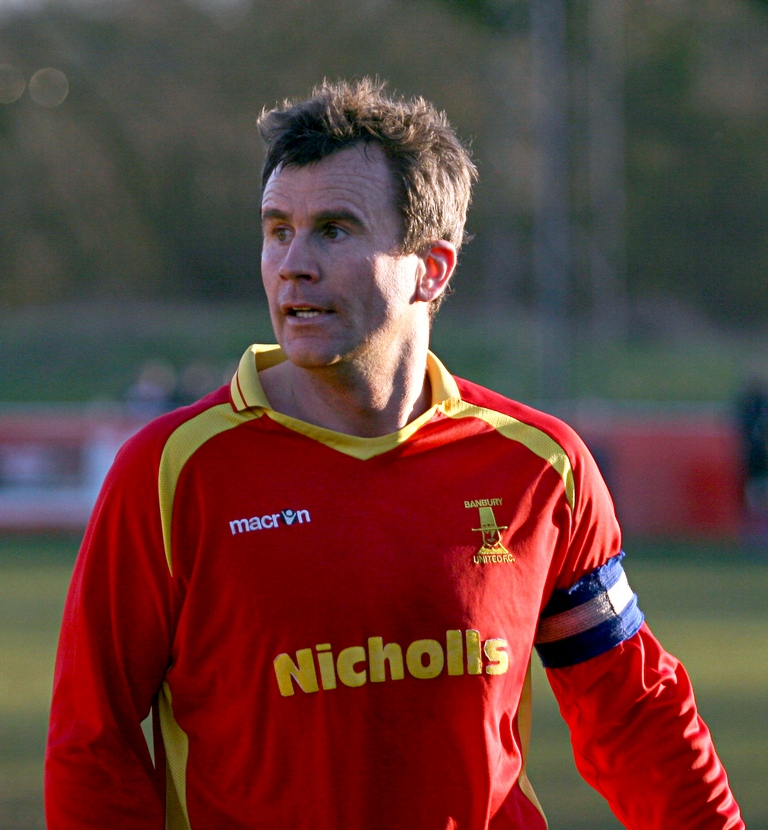

Personal information
- Full name: Howard Lee Forinton
- Date of birth: 18 September 1975 (age 51)
- Place of birth: Boston, England
- Height: 5 ft 11 in (1.80 m)
- Position: Striker

Youth career
- 1992–1994: Oxford United

Senior career*
Years	Team	Apps	(Gls)
1995	Abingdon Town		
1996	Oxford City		
1996–1997	Yeovil Town	21	(23)
1997–1999	Birmingham City	5	(1)
1998–1999	→ Plymouth Argyle (loan)	9	(3)
1999	→ Blackpool (loan)	0	(0)
1999–2002	Peterborough United	50	(10)
2001	→ Yeovil Town (loan)	2	(1)
2002	Torquay United	1	(0)
2002	Yeovil Town	14	(4)
2002–2003	Oxford City		
2003	Stevenage Borough	0	(0)
2003	Oxford City		
2003–2004	Farnborough Town	23	(3)
2004–2005	Banbury United	38	(22)
2005–2006	Halesowen Town	37	(9)
2006–2007	Banbury United	36	(13)
2007–2008	Redditch United		
2008–2009	Banbury United	65	(9)
2009–2010	Woodford United		
2010–2011	Daventry Town		
2012	Banbury United		
2012–13	Southam United 2 caps 1 goal		

Managerial career
- 2012: Woodford United
- * Club domestic league appearances and goals

Howard Lee Forinton (born 18 September 1975) is a former professional footballer who played as a striker.

Forinton made 65 appearances and scored 14 goals in the Football League playing for Birmingham City, Plymouth Argyle, Peterborough United and Torquay United. Forinton also managed at Southern Football League side Woodford United having been appointed in September 2012 though he departed in November 2012 with the club rooted to the bottom of the table.

== Career ==
Forinton was born in Boston, Lincolnshire. He began his football career as an apprentice at Oxford United, but was released at the end of his apprenticeship. He joined Abingdon Town and, after a short spell at Oxford City, he joined Yeovil Town where he scored 23 goals in just 25 matches. His prolific scoring soon caught the eye of Birmingham City boss Trevor Francis, who paid £75,000 for him. He made very few first-team appearances but finished as top scorer for Birmingham's reserve team in both of his seasons at the club. While at Birmingham City he went on loan to both Plymouth Argyle and Blackpool.

In November 1999, he signed for Peterborough United for £250,000. However, after a number of injuries he failed to impress. He looked set to join Plymouth Argyle in July 2000, but remained with Peterborough and joined Yeovil Town on loan in 2001.

Forinton moved to Torquay United on a free transfer in August 2002, signing on a non-contract basis, and made just one appearance, in which he set up a goal, before the club decided not to offer him a further deal. He returned to Yeovil on a monthly contract later the same month, but was released in November 2002 while awaiting operations on both ankles. He joined Oxford City the following month, and then moved to Stevenage Borough in June 2003, but was released in September 2003 and returned to Oxford City the following month.

In November 2003 Forinton moved to Farnborough Town. He then moved to Banbury United in June 2004, leaving to join Halesowen Town in May 2005. After one season at Halesowen he re-signed for Banbury in May 2006. In October 2006 he rejected a move to Bath City, opting to stay at Banbury to take on a player/coach role in the club.

Forinton left Banbury United after the departure of manager Kevin Brock to join Redditch United in June 2007, but rejoined Banbury United in October 2008.

At the end of 2009, Forinton left Banbury United for Woodford United in the Southern League Midlands Division, to pursue a player/coach role. After a spell with Daventry Town, Forinton returned to Banbury United for the 2012–13 season in a player/coach capacity before departing just two months later after the playing budget was cut. Forinton returned to Woodford United having taken up his first managerial post, in 2012. However, he resigned in November 2012 after only two months in the job, and was one of many Woodford managers during the 2012–13 season which culminated in their relegation from the Southern Football League in 2013 with the unwanted record of having lost all 42 matches.
