= David Farrell (footballer, born 1971) =

English footballer

Personal information
- Full name: David William Farrell
- Date of birth: 11 November 1971 (age 54)
- Place of birth: Birmingham, England
- Height: 5 ft 11 in (1.80 m)

Senior career*
Years	Team	Apps	(Gls)
1991–1992	Redditch United		
1992–1995	Aston Villa	6	(0)
1993	→ Scunthorpe United (loan)	0	(0)
1995–1997	Wycombe Wanderers	60	(6)
1997–2006	Peterborough United	337	(42)
2006–2007	Boston United	40	(1)
2007–2008	Burton Albion	21	(0)
2008–2009	Boston United	31	(1)
2009–2010	Stamford		
- * Club domestic league appearances and goals

David William Farrell (born 11 November 1971) is an English former footballer. Farrell made over 400 appearances in the Football League for Wycombe Wanderers, Peterborough United and Boston United between 1995 and 2007.

== Career ==
Farrell began his career at non-league club Redditch United in 1991 before joining Aston Villa in 1992 for a fee of £45,000. He made eight league and cup appearances for Aston Villa in three seasons and then joined Wycombe Wanderers for a fee of £100,000, where he made over 70 appearances in all competitions in two seasons. He moved on to Peterborough United in June 1997, where he spent nine seasons, making almost 400 appearances and scored 52 goals, and became a London Road legend. He was not offered a new contract at the end of the 2005–06 season, due to the manager wanting someone younger, and left the club, joining Boston United in June 2006, where he made 43 appearances during the 2006–07 season as Boston were ultimately relegated from the Football League in May 2007.

After one season at Boston, Farrell joined Conference National side Burton Albion in July 2007. He was released by Burton after his one-year contract expired at the end of the 2007–08 season and re-joined Boston United, now in the Northern Premier League Premier Division, in June 2008.

== Career statistics ==
This table is incomplete.

Club	Season	League		FA Cup		League Cup		Other^{[A]}		Total	
Club	Season	Apps	Goals	Apps	Goals	Apps	Goals	Apps	Goals	Apps	Goals
Aston Villa	1992–93	2	0	0	0	0	0	–		2	0
Aston Villa	1993–94	4	0	0	0	0	0	0	0	4	0
Aston Villa	1994–95	0	0	0	0	2	0	0	0	2	0
Aston Villa	1995–96	0	0	–		–		–		0	0
Aston Villa	Total	6	0	0	0	2	0	0	0	8	0
Scunthorpe United (loan)	1992–93	5	1	–	–	–	–	2	0	7	1
Wycombe Wanderers	1995–96	33	7	2	0	2	0	2	0	39	7
Wycombe Wanderers	1996–97	?	0	0	0	0	0	0	0	?	0
Wycombe Wanderers	Total	60	6	0	0	?	0	?	?	?	?
Peterborough United	1997–98	42	6	3	0	4	1	4	1	53	8
Peterborough United	1998–99	37	4	1	0	1	0	1	0	40	4
Peterborough United	1999–00	35	3	0	0	2	0	3	3	40	6
Peterborough United	2000–01	44	7	5	1	2	1	0	0	51	9
Peterborough United	2001–02^{[B]}	38	6	5	2	2	0	1	0	46	8
Peterborough United	2002–03	37	3	1	0	0	0	1	0	39	3
Peterborough United	2003–04	44	5	3	0	1	0	3	1	51	6
Peterborough United	2004–05	31	2	4	0	1	0	0	0	36	2
Peterborough United	2005–06	29	6	1	0	1	0	1	0	32	6
Peterborough United	Total	337	42	23	3	14	2	14	5	388	52
Boston United	2006–07	?	0	0	0	0	0	0	0	?	0
Burton Albion	2007–08	?	0	0	0	0	0	0	0	?	0
Career totals		468	52	27	3	23	2	20	5	538	62

=== Notes ===
A. The "Other" column constitutes appearances and goals in the Football League Trophy unless stated. In 1999/00 the data relates to the Football League play-offs.
B. The season summary source wrongly lists Farrell as scoring two goals in 'Other competitions'. This is proved to be incorrect by analysis of Peterborough's games/scorers for that season

== Honours ==
Peterborough United

- Football League Third Division play-offs: 2000

Individual

- PFA Team of the Year: 1997–98 Third Division
