= Daniel French (footballer) =

English footballer

Personal information
- Date of birth: 25 November 1979 (age 46)
- Place of birth: Peterborough, England
- Position: Midfielder

Senior career*
Years	Team	Apps	(Gls)
1997–2002	Peterborough United	18	(1)
2000	→ Boston United (loan)	6	(0)
2002	Cambridge City		
- * Club domestic league appearances and goals

Daniel French (born 25 November 1979) is an English footballer who played in The Football League for Peterborough United.
