= Ritchie Hanlon =

English footballer (born 1978)

Personal information
- Full name: Richard Kenneth Hanlon
- Date of birth: 26 May 1978 (age 48)
- Place of birth: Wembley, England
- Position: Midfielder

Team information
- Current team: Hayes & Yeading United (assistant manager)

Youth career
- 1994–1996: Chelsea

Senior career*
Years	Team	Apps	(Gls)
1996–1997	Southend United	2	(0)
1997–1998	Welling United	30	(15)
1998	Rushden & Diamonds		
1998–2001	Peterborough United	47	(3)
1999	→ Welling United (loan)		
1999	→ Welling United (loan)	19	(11)
2001–2004	Rushden & Diamonds	62	(7)
2004	Stevenage Borough	18	(2)
2004	→ Lincoln City (loan)	1	(0)
2004–2005	Lincoln City	11	(1)
2005	Weymouth	4	(0)
2005–2007	Cambridge United	37	(3)

Managerial career
- 2007: St Albans City
- 2012–2016: Kings Langley (joint manager)
- 2016–2017: Hayes & Yeading United (joint manager)
- 2023: Hayes & Yeading United
- * Club domestic league appearances and goals

Richard Kenneth Hanlon (born 26 May 1978) is an English former footballer who played as a midfielder. He is currently assistant manager of Hayes & Yeading United.

He played in the Football League with Southend United, Peterborough United, Rushden & Diamonds and Lincoln City. Hanlon also played non-League football with Welling United, Stevenage Borough, Weymouth and Cambridge United. He was forced to retire aged 28 with a knee injury.

Hanlon had a stint in 2007 managing St Albans City in the Conference South. He also had a couple of seasons managing his sons Abbots Langley Youth U7's-U8's. In July 2012, he was appointed as joint manager alongside Paul Hughes at Kings Langley in the Spartan South Midlands Football League Division One.

== Playing career ==
Hanlon made his debut for Southend United in the First Division on 18 January 1997, away to Sheffield United in the 3–0 defeat. After just two League appearances for Southend, he then dropped down into the Conference National with Welling United in 1997. In 1998, Hanlon joined Rushden & Diamonds and then Peterborough United in December. He made his debut for Peterborough in the 3–1 home win against Scarborough in Division Three, replacing Matthew Etherington as a substitute in the 87th minute. Whilst on the books with Peterborough, Hanlon had two spells on loan with non-League club Welling United. He then joined Rushden & Diamonds in 2001, where he made 62 appearances scoring seven goals in three-years. Hanlon joined Stevenage Borough in June 2004 along with Dannie Bulman from Wycombe Wanderers. He played 18 games in the Conference National for Stevenage, scoring twice. In December 2004, Lincoln City signed Hanlon on a one-month loan deal, after being transfer listed by Stevenage manager, Graham Westley. His move was made permanent days later. After his time at Lincoln, he moved to Conference South club Weymouth where he made four appearances before joining Cambridge United in September 2005. Hanlon made 37 appearances, scoring three goals for Cambridge in two seasons in the Conference National. He was forced to retire in January 2007 due to a persistent knee injury.

== Managerial career ==
At age 29, Hanlon was appointed manager of Conference South outfit St Albans City in May 2007, but lasted only ten games before being released in September. In July 2012, he was appointed as joint manager of Kings Langley of the Spartan South Midlands League Division One, alongside Paul Hughes, helping the club to three consecutive promotions - reaching the Southern League Premier Division in 2016.

In November 2016, Hanlon moved with Hughes to Hayes & Yeading. He departed for personal reasons soon after, leaving Hughes in sole charge.

In May 2023, following Hughes' resignation as manager, Hanlon was appointed manager of Hayes & Yeading United. In October, he stepped down as manager to become assistant to Mark Molesley.

== Honours ==
Peterborough United

- Football League Third Division play-offs: 2000
