= Simon Rea (footballer) =

English footballer

Personal information
- Full name: Simon Rea
- Date of birth: 20 September 1976 (age 50)
- Place of birth: Kenilworth, England
- Height: 6 ft 1 in (1.85 m)
- Position: Defender

Senior career*
Years	Team	Apps	(Gls)
1995–1999	Birmingham City	1	(0)
1995–1996	→ Kettering Town (loan)		
1999–2005	Peterborough United	159	(8)
2005	→ Cambridge United (loan)	4	(0)
2005–2006	Nuneaton Borough		
2006	→ Redditch United (loan)		
2006	→ Kidderminster Harriers (loan)	7	(0)
2006–20??	Redditch United		
- Corby Town
- Leamington
- * Club domestic league appearances and goals

Simon Rea (born 20 September 1976) is an English former professional footballer who played as a defender in the Football League with Birmingham City, Peterborough United and Cambridge United. He also played for non-league clubs Kettering Town, Nuneaton Borough, Redditch United, Kidderminster Harriers, Corby Town and Leamington.

Rea made 159 league appearances and played in another 22 national cup matches for Peterborough between 1999 and 2005.

== Honours ==
Peterborough United

- Football League Third Division play-offs: 2000
