= 2000 Football League play-offs =

Football League play-offs
- Season: 1999–2000
- Champions: Ipswich Town (First Division); Gillingham (Second Division); Peterborough United (Third Division)
- Matches played: 15
- Goals scored: 49 (3.27 per match)
- Biggest home win: Peterborough 3–0 Barnet (Third Division)
- Biggest away win: Birmingham 0–4 Barnsley (First Division)
- Highest scoring: Ipswich 5–3 Bolton (8 goals)
- Highest attendance: 73,427 – Barnsley v Ipswich (First Division final)
- Lowest attendance: 4,535 – Barnet v Peterborough (Third Division semi-final)
- Average attendance: 22,266

The Football League play-offs for the 1999–2000 season were held in May 2000, with the finals taking place at the old Wembley Stadium in London for the final time. The play-off semi-finals will be played over two legs and will be contested by the teams who finish in 3rd, 4th, 5th and 6th place in the Football League First Division and Football League Second Division and the 4th, 5th, 6th and 7th placed teams in the Football League Third Division table. The winners of the semi-finals will go through to the finals, with the winner of the matches gaining promotion for the following season.

== Background ==
The Football League play-offs have been held every year since 1987. They take place for each division following the conclusion of the regular season and are contested by the four clubs finishing below the automatic promotion places.

In the First Division, Ipswich Town, who are aiming to return to the top flight after 5 years outside the top flight, finished 2 points behind second placed Manchester City, who in turn finished 2 points behind champions Charlton Athletic, who returned to the top flight after being relegated last season. Barnsley who are aiming to return to the top flight after 2 seasons outside the top division, finished in fourth place in the table. Birmingham City, who are aiming to return to the top flight after 14 years outside the top division, finished in fifth place. Bolton Wanderers, who as well as Barnsley are aiming to return to the top flight after relegation 2 seasons ago, finished 1 point behind Birmingham City in sixth place.

== First Division ==
Pos	Team	Pld	W	D	L	GF	GA	GD	Pts
3	Ipswich Town	46	25	12	9	71	42	+29	87
4	Barnsley	46	24	10	12	88	67	+21	82
5	Birmingham City	46	22	11	13	65	44	+21	77
6	Bolton Wanderers	46	21	13	12	69	50	+19	76

=== Semi-finals ===
First leg

13 May 2000
15:00

Birmingham City	0–4	Barnsley
	Report	Shipperley 12'; Dyer 48', 60'; Hignett 84'

St Andrew's, Birmingham
Attendance: 26,492
Referee: Mark Halsey

14 May 2000
13:00

Bolton Wanderers	2–2	Ipswich Town
Holdsworth 5'; Guðjohnsen 26'	Report	Stewart 36', 65'

Reebok Stadium, Bolton
Attendance: 18,814
Referee: Rob Styles

Second leg

17 May 2000
19:45

Ipswich Town	5–3 (a.e.t.)	Bolton Wanderers
Magilton 18' (pen.), 49', 90'; Clapham 94' (pen.); Reuser 110'	Report	Holdsworth 6', 39'; Johnston 50'

Portman Road, Ipswich
Attendance: 21,543
Referee: Barry Knight

Ipswich Town won 7–5 on aggregate.

18 May 2000
19:45

Barnsley	1–2	Birmingham City
Dyer 54'	Report	Rowett 33'; Marcelo 75'

Oakwell, Barnsley
Attendance: 19,050
Referee: Mike Dean

Barnsley won 5–2 on aggregate.

=== Final ===
29 May 2000
15:00

Barnsley	2–4	Ipswich Town
Wright 6' (o.g.); Hignett 78' (pen.)	Report	Mowbray 28'; Naylor 52'; Stewart 58'; Reuser 90'

Wembley Stadium, London
Attendance: 73,427
Referee: Terry Heilbron

== Second Division ==
Pos	Team	Pld	W	D	L	GF	GA	GD	Pts
3	Gillingham	46	25	10	11	79	48	+31	85
4	Wigan Athletic	46	22	17	7	72	38	+34	83
5	Millwall	46	23	13	10	76	50	+26	82
6	Stoke City	46	23	13	10	68	42	+26	82

=== Semi-finals ===
First leg

13 May 2000
15:00

Millwall	0–0	Wigan Athletic
	Report

The New Den, London
Attendance: 14,091
Referee: Terry Heilbron

13 May 2000
15:00

Stoke City	3–2	Gillingham
Gunnlaugsson 1'; Lightbourne 8'; Thorne 67'	Report	Gooden 18'; Hassenthaler 90'

Britannia Stadium, Stoke-on-Trent
Attendance: 22,124
Referee: Mike Dean

Second leg

17 May 2000
19:45

Gillingham	3–0 (a.e.t.)	Stoke City
Ashby 55'; Onuora 102'; Smith 118'	Report

Priestfield Stadium, Gillingham
Attendance: 10,386
Referee: Rob Styles

Gillingham won 5–3 on aggregate.

17 May 2000
19:45

Wigan Athletic	1–0	Millwall
Sheridan 61'

JJB Stadium, Wigan
Attendance: 10,642
Referee: David Laws

Wigan Athletic won 1–0 on aggregate.

=== Final ===
28 May 2000
15:00

Wigan Athletic	2–3 (a.e.t.)	Gillingham
Haworth 59'; Barlow 99' (pen.)	Report	McGibbon 35' (o.g.); Butler 114'; Thomson 118'

Wembley Stadium, London
Attendance: 53,764
Referee: Rob Styles

== Third Division ==
Pos	Team	Pld	W	D	L	GF	GA	GD	Pts
4	Darlington	46	21	16	9	66	36	+30	79
5	Peterborough United	46	22	12	12	63	54	+9	78
6	Barnet	46	21	12	13	59	53	+6	75
7	Hartlepool United	46	21	9	16	60	49	+11	72

=== Semi-finals ===
First leg

13 May 2000
15:00

Barnet	1–2	Peterborough United
Arber 22'		Lee 5'; Clarke 68'

Underhill, London
Attendance: 4,535
Referee: David Laws

13 May 2000
15:00

Hartlepool United	0–2	Darlington
		Liddle 35'; Gabbiadini 76' (pen.)

Victoria Park, Hartlepool
Attendance: 6,995
Referee: Barry Knight

Second leg

17 May 2000
19:45

Darlington	1–0	Hartlepool United
Strodder 9' (o.g.)

Feethams, Darlington
Attendance: 8,238
Referee: Mark Halsey

Darlington won 3–0 on aggregate.

17 May 2000
19:45

Peterborough United	3–0	Barnet
Farrell 28', 70', 89'

London Road, Peterborough
Attendance: 10,515
Referee: Terry Heilbron

Peterborough United won 5–1 on aggregate.

=== Final ===
26 May 2000
19:45

Peterborough United	1–0	Darlington
Clarke 74'	Report

Wembley Stadium, London
Attendance: 33,383
Referee: Mike Dean
