= 1992–93 Wolverhampton Wanderers F.C. season =

English football club season

Wolverhampton Wanderers
1992–93 season
- Chairman: Jonathan Hayward
- Manager: Graham Turner
- First Division: 11th
- FA Cup: 4th round
- League Cup: 2nd round
- Anglo-Italian Cup: Preliminary round
- Top goalscorer: League: Steve Bull (16); All: Steve Bull (19)
- Highest home attendance: 19,120 (vs Bolton, 24 January 1993)
- Lowest home attendance: 3,091 (vs Peterborough, 30 September 1992)
- Average home league attendance: 13,052 (league only)

The 1992–93 season was the 94th season of competitive league football in the history of English football club Wolverhampton Wanderers. They played the season in the second tier of the English football system, which was now titled Football League First Division after the reorganisation of the leagues following the introduction of the Premier League.

The team remained unbeaten until its thirteenth game, making it their best start to a campaign since 1949–50, but were unable to maintain this level of consistency and ended in 11th place for a second consecutive season.

This season saw the North Bank of Molineux occupied for the first time since the mid-1980s, with the new Stan Cullis Stand being officially opened during pre-season.

== Results ==
=== Football League First Division ===
A total of 24 teams competed in the Football League First Division in the 1992–93 season. Each team played every other team twice: once at their stadium, and once at the opposition's. Three points were awarded to teams for each win, one point per draw, and none for defeats. For the first time, teams finishing level on points were firstly divided by the number of goals scored rather than goal difference.

==== League table ====
Pos	Team	Pld	W	D	L	GF	GA	GD	Pts
9	Grimsby Town	46	19	7	20	58	57	+1	64
10	Peterborough United	46	16	14	16	55	63	−8	62
11	Wolverhampton Wanderers	46	16	13	17	57	56	+1	61
12	Charlton Athletic	46	16	13	17	49	46	+3	61
13	Barnsley	46	17	9	20	56	60	−4	60

Source: rsssf.com
Rules for classification: 1) Points; 2) Goals scored; 3) Goal difference

==== Results summary ====
Overall								Home						Away					
Pld	W	D	L	GF	GA	GD	Pts	W	D	L	GF	GA	GD	W	D	L	GF	GA	GD
46	16	13	17	57	56	+1	61	11	6	6	37	26	+11	5	7	11	20	30	−10

Source: Statto.com

==== Results by round ====
Round	1	2	3	4	5	6	7	8	9	10	11	12	13	14	15	16	17	18	19	20	21	22	23	24	25	26	27	28	29	30	31	32	33	34	35	36	37	38	39	40	41	42	43	44	45	46
Result	W	W	D	D	W	W	D	D	W	D	D	D	L	L	L	W	D	W	W	D	L	L	L	D	L	W	W	L	L	W	L	D	L	W	D	L	W	W	L	D	W	L	L	L	W	L
Position	4	1	2	5	3	3	3	3	3	3	3	3	4	6	7	7	5	6	5	5	6	6	9	7	9	8	7	10	10	7	8	9	11	9	11	12	10	8	9	9	9	9	10	11	9	11

Source: Statto.com
W = Win; D = Draw; L = Loss

==== Matches ====
15 August 1992 1	Brentford	0–2	Wolverhampton Wanderers	London
15:00 BST			Dennison 47'; Bull 53'	Stadium: Griffin Park; Attendance: 9,069

18 August 1992 2	Wolverhampton Wanderers	3–0	Leicester City	Wolverhampton
19:30 BST	Bull 19'; Mutch 38'; Birch 89' (pen.)			Stadium: Molineux; Attendance: 15,821

22 August 1992 3	Wolverhampton Wanderers	2–2	Swindon Town	Wolverhampton
15:00 BST	Mutch 44'; Downing 88'		Maskell 15'; Taylor 82'	Stadium: Molineux; Attendance: 15,493

29 August 1992 4	Oxford United	0–0	Wolverhampton Wanderers	Oxford
15:00 BST				Stadium: Manor Ground; Attendance: 7,592

1 September 1992 5	Barnsley	0–1	Wolverhampton Wanderers	Barnsley
19:45 BST			Birch 41'	Stadium: Oakwell; Attendance: 6,906

5 September 1992 6	Wolverhampton Wanderers	4–3	Peterborough United	Wolverhampton
15:00 BST	Bull 6'; Mutch 48', 50'; Burke 45'		Halsall 31'; Charlery 61'; Sterling 87'	Stadium: Molineux; Attendance: 14,532

13 September 1992 7	Leicester City	0–0	Wolverhampton Wanderers	Leicester
14:55 BST				Stadium: Filbert Street; Attendance: 12,965

19 September 1992 8	Wolverhampton Wanderers	2–2	Watford	Wolverhampton
15:00 BST	Bull 37', 87'		Furlong 14'; Nogan 56'	Stadium: Molineux; Attendance: 13,497

27 September 1992 9	Birmingham City	0–4	Wolverhampton Wanderers	Birmingham
14:55 BST			Roberts 13', 39', 45'; Downing 41'	Stadium: St Andrew's; Attendance: 14,319

4 October 1992 10	Wolverhampton Wanderers	0–0	West Ham United	Wolverhampton
14:55 BST				Stadium: Molineux; Attendance: 14,391

10 October 1992 11	Southend United	1–1	Wolverhampton Wanderers	Southend-on-Sea
15:00 BST	Benjamin 44' (pen.)		Mutch 40'	Stadium: Roots Hall; Attendance: 5,498

17 October 1992 12	Wolverhampton Wanderers	1–1	Portsmouth	Wolverhampton
15:00 BST	Birch 67'		Whittingham 34'	Stadium: Molineux; Attendance: 14,750

25 October 1992 13	Millwall	2–0	Wolverhampton Wanderers	London
14:55 GMT	Cooper 58'; Moralee 78'			Stadium: The Den; Attendance: 6,814

31 October 1992 14	Wolverhampton Wanderers	0–2	Derby County	Wolverhampton
15:00 GMT			Kitson 10'; Short 47'	Stadium: Molineux; Attendance: 17,270

3 November 1992 15	Sunderland	2–0	Wolverhampton Wanderers	Sunderland
19:45 GMT	Cunnington 27'; Goodman 87'			Stadium: Roker Park; Attendance: 15,144

7 November 1992 16	Wolverhampton Wanderers	5–1	Bristol Rovers	Wolverhampton
15:00 GMT	Dennison 7'; Bull 28', 61'; Burke 48', 55'		Saunders 21'	Stadium: Molineux; Attendance: 12,163

14 November 1992 17	Notts County	2–2	Wolverhampton Wanderers	Nottingham
15:00 GMT	Bartlett 80', 89'		Dennison 18'; Bull 47'	Stadium: Meadow Lane; Attendance: 8,494

22 November 1992 18	Wolverhampton Wanderers	2–1	Charlton Athletic	Wolverhampton
14:55 GMT	Burke 28'; Roberts 47'		Bumstead 40'	Stadium: Molineux; Attendance: 10,593

28 November 1992 19	Wolverhampton Wanderers	2–1	Grimsby Town	Wolverhampton
15:00 GMT	Mountfield 24'; Burke 36'		Lever 48'	Stadium: Molineux; Attendance: 14,240

5 December 1992 20	Cambridge United	1–1	Wolverhampton Wanderers	Cambridge
15:00 GMT	White 58'		Bull 79'	Stadium: Abbey Stadium; Attendance: 6,429

12 December 1992 21	Wolverhampton Wanderers	1–2	Luton Town	Wolverhampton
15:00 GMT	Blades 17'		Gray 21', 85'	Stadium: Molineux; Attendance: 13,932

19 December 1992 22	Tranmere Rovers	3–0	Wolverhampton Wanderers	Birkenhead
15:00 GMT	Aldridge 3', 66', 86'			Stadium: Prenton Park; Attendance: 9,758

26 December 1992 23	Newcastle United	2–1	Wolverhampton Wanderers	Newcastle upon Tyne
15:00 GMT	Kelly 43', 65'		Cook 33'	Stadium: St James' Park; Attendance: 30,137

28 December 1992 24	Wolverhampton Wanderers	0–0	Bristol City	Wolverhampton
15:00 GMT				Stadium: Molineux; Attendance: 16,419

9 January 1993 25	Watford	3–1	Wolverhampton Wanderers	Watford
15:00 GMT	Furlong 33', 75'; Nogan 89'		Mountfield 85'	Stadium: Vicarage Road; Attendance: 6,845

17 January 1993 26	Wolverhampton Wanderers	2–1	Birmingham City	Wolverhampton
14:55 GMT	Burke 83'; Mutch 87'		Tait 31'	Stadium: Molineux; Attendance: 13,560

27 January 1993 27	Wolverhampton Wanderers	1–0	Barnsley	Wolverhampton
19:30 GMT	Mutch 69'			Stadium: Molineux; Attendance: 11,342

30 January 1993 28	Swindon Town	1–0	Wolverhampton Wanderers	Swindon
15:00 GMT	Bodin 69'			Stadium: County Ground; Attendance: 10,812

6 February 1993 29	Wolverhampton Wanderers	1–2	Brentford	Wolverhampton
15:00 GMT	Mutch 49'		Allon 68' (pen.), 70'	Stadium: Molineux; Attendance: 12,361

13 February 1993 30	Peterborough United	2–3	Wolverhampton Wanderers	Peterborough
15:00 GMT	Halsall 4'; Adcock 47'		Burke 31'; Philliskirk 59' (o.g.); Roberts 73'	Stadium: London Road; Attendance: 9,195

20 February 1993 31	Wolverhampton Wanderers	0–1	Oxford United	Wolverhampton
15:00 GMT			Beauchamp 18'	Stadium: Molineux; Attendance: 12,791

27 February 1993 32	Wolverhampton Wanderers	1–1	Southend United	Wolverhampton
15:00 GMT	Bull 50'		Ansah 51'	Stadium: Molineux; Attendance: 11,563

6 March 1993 33	West Ham United	3–1	Wolverhampton Wanderers	London
15:00 GMT	Morley 58'; Dicks 61' (pen.); Mountfield 88' (o.g.)		Bull 58'	Stadium: Upton Park; Attendance: 24,679

9 March 1993 34	Wolverhampton Wanderers	3–0	Notts County	Wolverhampton
19:30 GMT	Bull 66', 89'; Johnson 78' (o.g.)			Stadium: Molineux; Attendance: 11,482

13 March 1993 35	Bristol Rovers	1–1	Wolverhampton Wanderers	Bath
15:00 GMT	Mehew 52'		Bull 8'	Stadium: Twerton Park; Attendance: 5,982

20 March 1993 36	Wolverhampton Wanderers	1–2	Cambridge United	Wolverhampton
15:00 GMT	Bull 65'		Butler 18'; Leadbitter 88'	Stadium: Molineux; Attendance: 11,473

23 March 1993 37	Charlton Athletic	0–1	Wolverhampton Wanderers	London
19:45 GMT			Dennison 87'	Stadium: The Valley; Attendance: 7,852

27 March 1993 38	Wolverhampton Wanderers	2–1	Sunderland	Wolverhampton
15:00 GMT	Dennison 2'; Sampson 70' (o.g.)		Harford 43'	Stadium: Molineux; Attendance: 12,731

3 April 1993 39	Grimsby Town	1–0	Wolverhampton Wanderers	Cleethorpes
15:00 BST	Dobbin 86'			Stadium: Blundell Park; Attendance: 5,080

7 April 1993 40	Luton Town	1–1	Wolverhampton Wanderers	Luton
19:45 BST	Gray 50'		Bull 81'	Stadium: Kenilworth Road; Attendance: 7,948

10 April 1993 41	Wolverhampton Wanderers	1–0	Newcastle United	Wolverhampton
15:00 BST	Mutch 55'			Stadium: Molineux; Attendance: 17,244

12 April 1993 42	Bristol City	1–0	Wolverhampton Wanderers	Bristol
15:00 BST	Bent 81'			Stadium: Ashton Gate; Attendance: 11,756

17 April 1993 43	Wolverhampton Wanderers	0–2	Tranmere Rovers	Wolverhampton
15:00 BST			Higgins 19'; Proctor 26'	Stadium: Molineux; Attendance: 13,060

24 April 1993 44	Portsmouth	2–0	Wolverhampton Wanderers	Portsmouth
15:00 BST	Daniel 62'; Walsh 86'			Stadium: Fratton Park; Attendance: 23,074

1 May 1993 45	Wolverhampton Wanderers	3–1	Millwall	Wolverhampton
15:00 BST	Burke 19'; Bradbury 20', 28'		Allen 67'	Stadium: Molineux; Attendance: 12,054

8 May 1993 46	Derby County	2–0	Wolverhampton Wanderers	Derby
15:00 BST	Gabbiadini 61'; Hayward 80'			Stadium: Baseball Ground; Attendance: 15,083

=== FA Cup ===
2 January 1993 R3	Watford	1–4	Wolverhampton Wanderers	Watford
15:00 GMT	Nogan 37'		Holdsworth 13' (o.g.); Downing 68'; Mutch 74'; Bull 85'	Stadium: Vicarage Road; Attendance: 12,363

24 January 1993 R4	Wolverhampton Wanderers	0–2	Bolton Wanderers	Wolverhampton
14:00 GMT			Green 11'; McGinlay 24'	Stadium: Molineux; Attendance: 19,120

=== League Cup ===
22 September 1992 R2.1	Notts County	3–2	Wolverhampton Wanderers	Nottingham
19:45 BST	Lund 20', 42'; Robinson 29'		Bull 11'; Cook 89' (pen.)	Stadium: Meadow Lane; Attendance: 4,197

7 October 1992 R2.2	Wolverhampton Wanderers	0–1 (2–4 agg.)	Notts County	Wolverhampton
19:30 BST			O'Riordan 76'	Stadium: Molineux; Attendance: 11,146

=== Anglo-Italian Cup ===
Wolves played in Group 4 of the preliminary round alongside two other domestic First Division clubs. The winner of the group would advance to the main group stage to play both English and Italian opposition. However, Wolves finished in second place in this initial round and so were eliminated.

15 September 1992	Tranmere Rovers	2–1	Wolverhampton Wanderers	Birkenhead
19:30 BST	Aldridge 69' (pen.), 88'		Birch 28' (pen.)	Stadium: Prenton Park; Attendance: 3,361

30 September 1992	Wolverhampton Wanderers	2–0	Peterborough United	Wolverhampton
19:30 BST	Taylor 4'; Bull 46'			Stadium: Molineux; Attendance: 3,091

== Players ==
Key:
‡ On loan from another club * First appearance(s) for the club

- # = Squad number
- Pos = Playing position
- P = Number of games played 10
- G = Number of goals scored
- GK = Goalkeeper
- DF = Defender
- MF = Midfielder
- FW = Forward
- = Yellow cards
- = Red cards
- † Permanent player left club during the season
- ¤ Loaned to another club for part or all of season

Correct as of end of season. Starting appearances are listed first, followed by substitute appearances in parentheses where applicable.

Pos	Name	P	G	P	G	P	G	P	G	P	G	A yellow card	A red card	Notes
Pos	Name	League		FA Cup		League Cup		Other		Total		Discipline		Notes
GK	(England) Dave Beasant ‡	4	0	1	0	0	0	0	0	5	0	0	0	
GK	(Wales) Paul Jones	16	0	1	0	0	0	1	0	18	0	0	0	
GK	(England) Mike Stowell	26	0	0	0	2	0	1	0	29	0	0	0	
DF	(England) Kevin Ashley	28	0	0	0	2	0	2	0	32	0	0	0	
DF	(England) Gary Bellamy †	0	0	0	0	0	0	0	0	0	0	0	0	
DF	(England) Paul Blades ‡	38(2)	1	1	0	1	0	0	0	40(2)	1	0	0	
DF	(England) Paul Edwards ‡	33(2)	0	2	0	2	0	1	0	38(2)	0	0	0	
DF	(England) Rob Hindmarch	0	0	0	0	0	0	0	0	0	0	0	0	
DF	(England) Lawrie Madden	19(5)	0	2	0	1	0	1	0	23(5)	0	0	0	
DF	(England) Derek Mountfield	34(2)	2	2	0	2	0	2	0	40(2)	2	0	0	
DF	(England) Darren Simkin	7	0	0	0	0	0	0	0	7	0	0	0	
DF	(England) Andy Thompson	15(5)	0	0	0	0	0	1	0	16(5)	0	0	0	
DF	(England) Mark Venus	12	0	1	0	0	0	0	0	13	0	0	0	
DF	(England) Shane Westley †	6(2)	0	0	0	0	0	1	0	7(2)	0	0	0	
MF	(Scotland) Tom Bennett	0(1)	0	0	0	0	0	0	0	0(1)	0	0	0	
MF	(England) Paul Birch	27(1)	3	0(1)	0	2	0	2	1	31(2)	4	0	1	
MF	(England) Mark Burke	27(5)	8	1	0	0	0	0(1)	0	28(6)	8	0	0	
MF	(England) Paul Cook	44	1	2	0	2	1	2	0	50	2	0	0	
MF	(Northern Ireland) Robbie Dennison	31(6)	5	1	0	0(2)	0	1(1)	0	33(9)	5	0	0	
MF	(England) Keith Downing	30(1)	2	2	1	2	0	2	0	36(1)	3	0	0	
MF	(England) Jimmy Kelly ¤	0	0	0	0	0	0	0	0	0	0	0	0	
MF	(England) Mark Rankine	23(4)	0	2	0	2	0	1	0	28(4)	0	0	0	
MF	(England) Tim Steele	1(3)	0	0	0	0	0	0	0	1(3)	0	0	0	
MF	(England) Mark Turner	1	0	0	0	0	0	0	0	1	0	0	0	
FW	(England) Shaun Bradbury	2	2	0	0	0	0	0	0	2	2	0	0	
FW	(England) Steve Bull	36	16	2	1	2	1	2	1	42	19	0	0	
FW	(England) Lee Mills	0	0	0	0	0	0	0	0	0	0	0	0	
FW	(England) Andy Mutch	34(5)	9	2	1	2	0	0	0	38(5)	10	0	0	
FW	(England) Darren Roberts	12(9)	5	0	0	0(1)	0	1(1)	0	13(11)	5	0	0	
FW	(England) Colin Taylor ¤	0(1)	0	0	0	0	0	1	1	1(1)	1	0	0	

Source: Wolverhampton Wanderers: The Complete Record

== Transfers ==
=== In ===
Date	Player	From	Fee
October 1992	(England) Paul Blades	Norwich City	£325,000
October 1992	(England) Paul Edwards	Coventry City	£100,000
November 1992	(England) Darren Simkin	Blakenhall Town	£10,000
9 December 1992	(England) Lee Mills	Stocksbridge Park Steels	£20,000

=== Out ===
Date	Player	To	Fee
June 1992	(England) Brian Roberts	Retired	Free
12 August 1992	(England) Tony Lange	West Bromwich Albion	Free
10 September 1992	(England) Gary Bellamy	Leyton Orient	£30,000
30 October 1992	(England) Shane Westley	Brentford	£100,000

=== Loans in ===
Start date	Player	From	End date
13 August 1992	(England) Paul Edwards	Coventry City	October 1992
14 August 1992	(England) Paul Blades	Norwich City	October 1992
12 January 1993	(England) Dave Beasant	Chelsea	End of season

=== Loans out ===
Start date	Player	From	End date
October 1992	(England) Colin Taylor	Preston North End	?
February 1993	(England) Colin Taylor	Doncaster Rovers	?
March 1993	(England) Jimmy Kelly	Walsall	End of season

== Management and coaching staff ==
Position	Name
Manager	Graham Turner
First team coach	Garry Pendrey
Director of Youth School of Excellence	Rob Kelly
Youth Team Coach	Chris Evans
Club doctors	Dr Tweddell and Dr Peter Bekenn
Club Physio	Paul Darby

== Kit ==
The season brought two new kits, with the home kit featuring an unpopular gold shirt decorated with black smears that even drew a protest reaction some fans. The away kit was a bright blue shirt with black bands and gold trim on the upper arms. Both were manufactured by the club's own "Molineux" label and sponsored by Goodyear.
