= 1991–92 Wolverhampton Wanderers F.C. season =

English football club season

Wolverhampton Wanderers
1991–92 season
- Chairman: Jack Harris
- Manager: Graham Turner
- Stadium: Molineux Stadium
- Second Division: 11th
- FA Cup: 3rd Round
- League Cup: 3rd Round
- Full Members Cup: 1st round
- Top goalscorer: League: Steve Bull (20); All: Steve Bull (23)
- Highest home attendance: 19,123 (vs Middlesbrough, 2 May 1992)
- Lowest home attendance: 8,536 (vs Bristol Rovers, 5 November 1991)
- Average home league attendance: 13,730 (league only)
Home colours

The 1991–92 season was the 93rd season of competitive league football in the history of English football club Wolverhampton Wanderers. They played in the second tier of the English football system, the Football League Second Division, in the final season before the introduction of the Premier League.

The team finished in 11th place, having occupied a mid-table position for the majority of the campaign. During the season Steve Bull became the club's all-time leading goalscorer when he surpassed John Richards' total of 194 goals.

== Results ==
=== Football League Second Division ===
A total of 24 teams competed in the Football League Second Division in the 1991–92 season. Each team played every other team twice: once at their stadium, and once at the opposition's. Three points were awarded to teams for each win, one point per draw, and none for defeats.

==== Final table ====
Pos	Team	Pld	W	D	L	GF	GA	GD	Pts	Qualification or relegation
9	Portsmouth	46	19	12	15	65	51	+14	69	Qualification for the First Division (Note: From the 1992–93 season, the first tier became the Premier League, the second tier - then known as the Second Division - was renamed to the First Division, and the third tier - then known as the Third Division - was renamed to the Second Division.)
10	Watford	46	18	11	17	51	48	+3	65	Qualification for the First Division
11	Wolverhampton Wanderers	46	18	10	18	61	54	+7	64	Qualification for the First Division
12	Southend United	46	17	11	18	63	63	0	62	Qualification for the First Division
13	Bristol Rovers	46	16	14	16	60	63	−3	62	Qualification for the First Division

Rules for classification: 1) Points; 2) Goal difference; 3) Goals scored

==== Results summary ====
Overall								Home						Away					
Pld	W	D	L	GF	GA	GD	Pts	W	D	L	GF	GA	GD	W	D	L	GF	GA	GD
46	18	10	18	61	54	+7	64	11	6	6	36	24	+12	7	4	12	25	30	−5

Source: Statto.com

==== Results by round ====
Round	1	2	3	4	5	6	7	8	9	10	11	12	13	14	15	16	17	18	19	20	21	22	23	24	25	26	27	28	29	30	31	32	33	34	35	36	37	38	39	40	41	42	43	44	45	46
Result	W	D	D	L	W	W	L	W	W	L	D	L	D	L	L	L	L	L	W	L	W	D	D	W	W	W	W	W	L	D	L	D	D	W	L	W	D	W	L	L	W	W	L	W	L	L
Position	1	5	8	14	9	8	9	6	4	6	7	10	10	16	17	18	20	21	18	20	15	17	18	15	11	11	10	10	10	11	12	12	12	11	11	11	11	11	11	11	11	10	10	10	10	11

Source: Statto.com
W = Win; D = Draw; L = Loss

==== Matches ====
17 August 1991 1	Watford	0–2	Wolverhampton Wanderers	Watford
15:00 BST			Mutch 61'; Bull 71'	Stadium: Vicarage Road; Attendance: 13,547

24 August 1991 2	Wolverhampton Wanderers	1–1	Charlton Athletic	Wolverhampton
15:00 BST	Bull 33'		Lee 6'	Stadium: Molineux; Attendance: 16,309

31 August 1991 3	Brighton & Hove Albion	3–3	Wolverhampton Wanderers	Hove
15:00 BST	O'Reilly 26'; Barham 31'; Robinson 79'		Mutch 24', 74'; Bull 33'	Stadium: Goldstone Ground; Attendance: 10,621

3 September 1991 4	Wolverhampton Wanderers	0–2	Port Vale	Wolverhampton
19:30 BST			Houchen 60'; Madden 77' (o.g.)	Stadium: Molineux; Attendance: 16,115

7 September 1991 5	Wolverhampton Wanderers	3–1	Oxford United	Wolverhampton
15:00 BST	Dennison 3'; Bull 8'; Steele 43'		Nogan 80'	Stadium: Molineux; Attendance: 12,549

14 September 1991 6	Newcastle United	1–2	Wolverhampton Wanderers	Newcastle upon Tyne
15:00 BST	Madden 83' (o.g.)		Scott 49' (o.g.); Bull 74'	Stadium: St James' Park; Attendance: 20,195

17 September 1991 7	Cambridge United	2–1	Wolverhampton Wanderers	Cambridge
19:30 BST	Taylor 25'; Wilkins 34'		Bull 78'	Stadium: Abbey Stadium; Attendance: 6,552

21 September 1991 8	Wolverhampton Wanderers	2–1	Swindon Town	Wolverhampton
15:00 BST	Steele 8'; Bull 78'		White 87'	Stadium: Molineux; Attendance: 15,219

28 September 1991 9	Southend United	0–2	Wolverhampton Wanderers	Southend-on-Sea
15:00 BST			Birch 61'; Ashley 89'	Stadium: Roots Hall; Attendance: 8,368

5 October 1991 10	Wolverhampton Wanderers	1–2	Barnsley	Wolverhampton
15:00 BST	Cook 30'		Saville 56'; O'Connell 81'	Stadium: Molineux; Attendance: 14,082

12 October 1991 11	Middlesbrough	0–0	Wolverhampton Wanderers	Middlesbrough
15:00 BST				Stadium: Ayresome Park; Attendance: 15,253

19 October 1991 12	Leicester City	3–0	Wolverhampton Wanderers	Leicester
15:00 BST	Gordon 5', 48'; Wright 39'			Stadium: Filbert Street; Attendance: 14,428

26 October 1991 13	Wolverhampton Wanderers	1–1	Tranmere Rovers	Wolverhampton
15:00 BST	Birch 44'		Steel 76'	Stadium: Molineux; Attendance: 12,266

2 November 1991 14	Plymouth Argyle	1–0	Wolverhampton Wanderers	Plymouth
15:00 GMT	Marshall 35'			Stadium: Home Park; Attendance: 4,198

5 November 1991 15	Wolverhampton Wanderers	2–3	Bristol Rovers	Wolverhampton
19:30 GMT	Bull 40', 77'		Reece 5'; Pounder 67'; Saunders 75'	Stadium: Molineux; Attendance: 8,536

9 November 1991 16	Wolverhampton Wanderers	2–3	Derby County	Wolverhampton
15:00 GMT	Coleman 21' (o.g.); Cook 68' (pen.)		Davison 11', 90'; Ormondroyd 85'	Stadium: Molineux; Attendance: 15,672

16 November 1991 17	Millwall	2–1	Wolverhampton Wanderers	London
15:00 GMT	Barber 31'; McGinley 34'		Cook 42' (pen.)	Stadium: The Den; Attendance: 9,469

23 November 1991 18	Wolverhampton Wanderers	1–2	Ipswich Town	Wolverhampton
15:00 GMT	Birch 7'		Linighan 55'; Dozzell 61'	Stadium: Molineux; Attendance: 11,915

26 November 1991 19	Wolverhampton Wanderers	2–1	Grimsby Town	Wolverhampton
19:30 GMT	Madden 26'; Birch 82'		Dobbin 76'	Stadium: Molineux; Attendance: 9,378

30 November 1991 20	Portsmouth	1–0	Wolverhampton Wanderers	Portsmouth
15:00 GMT	Burns 13'			Stadium: Fratton Park; Attendance: 11,101

7 December 1991 21	Wolverhampton Wanderers	1–0	Sunderland	Wolverhampton
15:00 GMT	Cook 83'			Stadium: Molineux; Attendance: 11,922

21 December 1991 22	Port Vale	1–1	Wolverhampton Wanderers	Burslem
15:00 GMT	van der Laan 87'		Bull 13'	Stadium: Vale Park; Attendance: 8,480

26 December 1991 23	Wolverhampton Wanderers	0–0	Blackburn Rovers	Wolverhampton
15:00 GMT				Stadium: Molineux; Attendance: 18,277

28 December 1991 24	Wolverhampton Wanderers	2–0	Brighton & Hove Albion	Wolverhampton
15:00 GMT	Burke 2'; Mutch 26'			Stadium: Molineux; Attendance: 13,606

1 January 1992 25	Grimsby Town	0–2	Wolverhampton Wanderers	Cleethorpes
19:30 GMT			Birch 16'; Cook 80'	Stadium: Blundell Park; Attendance: 9,158

15 January 1992 26	Charlton Athletic	0–2	Wolverhampton Wanderers	London
19:30 GMT			Bull 43'; Bennett 84'	Stadium: The Valley; Attendance: 5,703

18 January 1992 27	Wolverhampton Wanderers	3–0	Watford	Wolverhampton
15:00 GMT	Cook 62'; Bull 75'; Holdsworth 80' (o.g.)			Stadium: Molineux; Attendance: 14,175

1 February 1992 28	Wolverhampton Wanderers	1–0	Leicester City	Wolverhampton
15:00 GMT	Bull 36'			Stadium: Molineux; Attendance: 18,574

8 February 1992 29	Tranmere Rovers	4–3	Wolverhampton Wanderers	Birkenhead
15:00 GMT	Aldridge 3' (pen.); Malkin 6'; Morrissey 63', 90'		Cook 8'; Bull 12'; Burke 55'	Stadium: Prenton Park; Attendance: 11,371

22 February 1992 30	Wolverhampton Wanderers	0–0	Portsmouth	Wolverhampton
15:00 GMT				Stadium: Molineux; Attendance: 15,707

29 February 1992 31	Sunderland	1–0	Wolverhampton Wanderers	Sunderland
15:00 GMT	Byrne 30' (pen.)			Stadium: Roker Park; Attendance: 20,106

7 March 1992 32	Wolverhampton Wanderers	1–1	Bristol City	Wolverhampton
15:00 GMT	Bull 45'		Osman 41'	Stadium: Molineux; Attendance: 12,542

11 March 1992 33	Bristol Rovers	1–1	Wolverhampton Wanderers	Bath
19:30 GMT	White 53'		Bull 77'	Stadium: Twerton Park; Attendance: 6,968

14 March 1992 34	Wolverhampton Wanderers	1–0	Plymouth Argyle	Wolverhampton
15:00 GMT	Venus 70'			Stadium: Molineux; Attendance: 11,556

17 March 1992 35	Bristol City	2–0	Wolverhampton Wanderers	Bristol
19:30 GMT	Dziekanowski 85', 87'			Stadium: Ashton Gate; Attendance: 11,623

21 March 1992 36	Derby County	1–2	Wolverhampton Wanderers	Derby
15:00 GMT	Kitson 44'		Birch 73' (pen.); Bull 74'	Stadium: Baseball Ground; Attendance: 21,024

28 March 1992 37	Wolverhampton Wanderers	0–0	Millwall	Wolverhampton
15:00 GMT				Stadium: Molineux; Attendance: 11,880

31 March 1992 38	Wolverhampton Wanderers	6–2	Newcastle United	Wolverhampton
19:30 BST	Mutch 5', 10', 84'; Bennett 25'; Cook 48'; Bull 87'		Quinn 12'; Peacock 72'	Stadium: Molineux; Attendance: 14,880

4 April 1992 39	Oxford United	1–0	Wolverhampton Wanderers	Oxford
15:00 BST	Penney 87'			Stadium: Manor Ground; Attendance: 7,165

7 April 1992 40	Ipswich Town	2–1	Wolverhampton Wanderers	Ipswich
19:30 BST	Whelan 58'; Whitton 90' (pen.)		Mutch 84'	Stadium: Portman Road; Attendance: 17,379

11 April 1992 41	Wolverhampton Wanderers	2–1	Cambridge United	Wolverhampton
15:00 BST	Rankine 73'; Mutch 82'		Norbury 64'	Stadium: Molineux; Attendance: 11,188

14 April 1992 42	Blackburn Rovers	1–2	Wolverhampton Wanderers	Blackburn
19:30 BST	Sellars 23'		Bull 54'; Birch 90'	Stadium: Ewood Park; Attendance: 14,144

18 April 1992 43	Swindon Town	1–0	Wolverhampton Wanderers	Swindon
15:00 BST	Ling 10'			Stadium: County Ground; Attendance: 10,863

20 April 1992 44	Wolverhampton Wanderers	3–1	Southend United	Wolverhampton
15:00 BST	Bull 37'; Mountfield 52'; Birch 60'		Benjamin 39'	Stadium: Molineux; Attendance: 10,953

25 April 1992 45	Barnsley	2–0	Wolverhampton Wanderers	Barnsley
15:00 BST	Bullimore 29'; Rammell 87'			Stadium: Oakwell; Attendance: 7,244

2 May 1992 46	Wolverhampton Wanderers	1–2	Middlesbrough	Wolverhampton
15:00 BST	Mutch 66'		Slaven 72'; Wilkinson 77'	Stadium: Molineux; Attendance: 19,123

=== FA Cup ===
4 January 1992 R3	Nottingham Forest	1–0	Wolverhampton Wanderers	Nottingham
15:00 GMT	Clough 82'			Stadium: City Ground; Attendance: 27,068

=== League Cup ===
24 September 1991 R2.1	Wolverhampton Wanderers	6–1	Shrewsbury Town	Wolverhampton
19:30 BST	Birch 13', 36'; Burke 33'; Bull 44', 49'; Steele 65'		Summerfield 22'	Stadium: Molineux; Attendance: 12,229

8 October 1991 R2.2	Shrewsbury Town	3–1 (4–7 agg.)	Wolverhampton Wanderers	Shrewsbury
19:30 BST	Summerfield 2'; Lyne 51', 90'		Steele 7'	Stadium: Gay Meadow; Attendance: 5,784

30 October 1991 R3	Everton	4–1	Wolverhampton Wanderers	Liverpool
19:30 GMT	Beagrie 17', 23'; Cottee 61'; Beardsley 88'		Bull 22'	Stadium: Goodison Park; Attendance: 19,065

=== Full Members Cup ===
1 October 1991 R1	Grimsby Town	1–0	Wolverhampton Wanderers	Cleethorpes
19:30 BST	Rees 29'			Stadium: Blundell Park; Attendance: 1,593

== Players ==
Key:
‡ On loan from another club * First appearance(s) for the club

- # = Squad number
- Pos = Playing position
- P = Number of games played
- G = Number of goals scored
- GK = Goalkeeper
- DF = Defender
- MF = Midfielder
- FW = Forward
- = Yellow cards
- = Red cards
- † Permanent player left club during the season
- ¤ Loaned to another club for part or all of season

Correct as of end of season. Starting appearances are listed first, followed by substitute appearances in parentheses where applicable.

Pos	Name	P	G	P	G	P	G	P	G	P	G	A yellow card	A red card	Notes
Pos	Name	League		FA Cup		League Cup		Other		Total		Discipline		Notes
GK	(England) Tony Lange ¤	0	0	0	0	0	0	0	0	0	0	0	0	
GK	(Wales) Paul Jones	0	0	0	0	0	0	0	0	0	0	0	0	
GK	(England) Mike Stowell	46	0	1	0	3	0	1	0	51	0	0	0	
DF	(England) Kevin Ashley	44	1	1	0	3	0	1	0	49	1	0	0	
DF	(England) Gary Bellamy ¤	1(3)	0	0	0	1	0	1	0	3(3)	0	0	0	
DF	(England) Nicky Clarke †	1	0	0	0	0	0	0	0	1	0	0	0	
DF	(England) Rob Hindmarch	0	0	0	0	0	0	0	0	0	0	0	0	
DF	(England) Lawrie Madden	37(1)	2	1	0	3	0	1	0	42(1)	2	0	1	
DF	(England) Derek Mountfield ‡	28	1	0	0	0	0	0	0	28	1	0	1	
DF	(England) Brian Roberts	0	0	0	0	0	0	0	0	0	0	0	0	
DF	(England) Darren Simkin	0	0	0	0	0	0	0	0	0	0	0	0	
DF	(England) Andy Thompson	15(2)	0	1	0	1	0	0	0	17(2)	0	0	0	
DF	(England) Mark Venus	46	1	1	0	3	0	1	0	51	1	0	0	
DF	(England) Shane Westley	0	0	0	0	0	0	0	0	0	0	0	0	
MF	(Scotland) Tom Bennett	37(1)	2	1	0	3	0	1	0	42(1)	2	0	0	
MF	(England) Paul Birch	43(2)	8	1	0	3	2	1	0	48(2)	10	0	0	
MF	(England) Mark Burke	13(5)	2	1	0	1	1	0(1)	0	15(6)	3	0	0	
MF	(England) Paul Cook	43	8	1	0	2	0	1	0	47	8	0	0	
MF	(Northern Ireland) Robbie Dennison	12(10)	1	0(1)	0	1	0	1	0	14(11)	1	0	0	
MF	(England) Keith Downing	30(2)	0	0	0	2	0	1	0	33(2)	0	0	0	
MF	(England) Jimmy Kelly	0(3)	0	0	0	0	0	0	0	0(3)	0	0	0	
MF	(England) Mark Rankine	10(5)	1	0	0	0	0	0	0	10(5)	1	0	0	
MF	(England) Tim Steele ¤	10(7)	3	0	0	3	2	0	0	13(7)	5	0	0	
MF	(England) Mark Turner	0	0	0	0	0	0	0	0	0	0	0	0	
FW	(England) Shaun Bradbury	0	0	0	0	1	0	0	0	1	0	0	0	
FW	(England) Steve Bull	43	20	1	0	2	3	1	0	47	23	0	0	
FW	(England) Wayne Clarke ‡	1	0	0	0	0	0	0	0	1	0	0	0	
FW	(England) Paul McLoughlin ¤†	3	0	0	0	0	0	0	0	3	0	0	0	
FW	(England) Andy Mutch	35(2)	10	1	0	1	0	0	0	37(2)	10	0	0	
FW	(South Africa) John Paskin ¤†	1(1)	0	0	0	0	0	0	0	1(1)	0	0	0	
FW	(England) Darren Roberts	0	0	0	0	0	0	0	0	0	0	0	0	
FW	(England) Colin Taylor ¤	1(2)	0	0	0	0	0	0	0	1(2)	0	0	0	

Source: Wolverhampton Wanderers: The Complete Record

== Transfers ==
=== In ===
Date	Player	From	Fee
23 July 1991	(Wales) Paul Jones	Kidderminster Harriers	£40,000
15 August 1991	(England) Lawrie Madden	Sheffield Wednesday	Free
24 January 1992	(England) Derek Mountfield	Aston Villa	£150,000
31 January 1992	(England) Mark Rankine	Doncaster Rovers	£70,000
21 February 1992	(England) Jimmy Kelly	(Wales) Wrexham	Part exchange
23 April 1992	(England) Darren Roberts	Burton Albion	£20,000

=== Out ===
Date	Player	To	Fee
June 1991	(England) Paul Jones	Released	Free
24 July 1991	(England) Vince Bartram	Bournemouth	£70,000
December 1991	(England) Nicky Clarke	Mansfield Town	£25,000
January 1992	(England) Paul McLoughlin	Mansfield Town	£35,000
21 February 1992	(South Africa) John Paskin	(Wales) Wrexham	Part exchange

=== Loans in ===
Start date	Player	From	End date
26 September 1991	(England) Wayne Clarke	Manchester City	October 1991
7 November 1991	(England) Derek Mountfield	Aston Villa	24 January 1992

=== Loans out ===
Start date	Player	From	End date
11 September 1991	(South Africa) John Paskin	Stockport County	20 November 1991
12 September 1991	(England) Tony Lange	Torquay United	End of season
September 1991	(England) Paul McLoughlin	Walsall	October 1991
1991	(England) Paul McLoughlin	York City	?
21 November 1991	(South Africa) John Paskin	Birmingham City	12 February 1992
January 1992	(England) Colin Taylor	Wigan Athletic	?
13 February 1992	(South Africa) John Paskin	Shrewsbury Town	20 February 1992
20 February 1992	(England) Tim Steele	Stoke City	End of season
18 March 1992	(England) Gary Bellamy	(Wales) Cardiff City	End of season

== Management and coaching staff ==
Position	Name
Manager	Graham Turner
Coach	Garry Pendrey
Youth Team Coach	Chris Evans
Club doctors	Dr Tweddell and Dr Peter Bekenn
Club Physio	Paul Darby
