= 1993–94 Wolverhampton Wanderers F.C. season =

English football club season

Wolverhampton Wanderers
1993–94 season
- Chairman: Jonathan Hayward
- Manager: Graham Turner (until 16 March); Graham Taylor (from 29 March)
- First Division: 8th
- FA Cup: Quarter-finals
- League Cup: 2nd Round
- Anglo-Italian Cup: Preliminary round
- Top goalscorer: League: Steve Bull (14); All: Steve Bull (15)
- Highest home attendance: 28,234 (vs Ipswich, 19 February 1994)
- Lowest home attendance: 9,092 (vs Stoke, 31 August 1993)
- Average home league attendance: 21,996 (league only)

The 1993–94 season was the 95th season of competitive league football in the history of English football club Wolverhampton Wanderers. They played the season in the second tier of the English football system, the Football League First Division.

This season saw the completion of the redevelopment of Molineux which was officially opened on 7 December 1993 to bring the club's highest crowds since the early 1980s. With the expense of the stadium completed by owner Sir Jack Hayward, manager Graham Turner was afforded the biggest budget he had been granted during his tenure but he resigned in March 1994 to end his 7½-year reign with the team in 13th place.

Former England manager Graham Taylor was appointed as Turner's replacement but the team were unable to improve enough to reach the promotion play-offs, ending in 8th place.

== Results ==
=== Football League First Division ===
A total of 24 teams competed in the Football League First Division in the 1993–94 season. Each team played every other team twice: once at their stadium, and once at the opposition's. Three points were awarded to teams for each win, one point per draw, and none for defeats. Teams finishing level on points were firstly divided by the number of goals scored rather than goal difference.

14 August 1993 1	Wolverhampton Wanderers	3–1	Bristol City	Wolverhampton
15:00 BST	Bull 9', 87'; Mountfield 67'		Scott 58'	Stadium: Molineux; Attendance: 21,052

22 August 1993 2	Birmingham City	2–2	Wolverhampton Wanderers	Birmingham
14:55 BST	Peschisolido 50'; Saville 52'		Venus 35'; Thomas 36'	Stadium: St Andrew's; Attendance: 15,117

25 August 1993 3	Wolverhampton Wanderers	2–0	Millwall	Wolverhampton
19:30 BST	Bull 32'; Kelly 52'			Stadium: Molineux; Attendance: 19,570

28 August 1993 4	Wolverhampton Wanderers	2–3	Middlesbrough	Wolverhampton
15:00 BST	Kelly 5'; Thomas 9'		Hendrie 3', 73'; Pollock 85'	Stadium: Molineux; Attendance: 21,061

5 September 1993 5	West Bromwich Albion	3–2	Wolverhampton Wanderers	West Bromwich
14:55 BST	Raven 16'; Bradley 51'; Donovan 58'		Bull 12'; Thomas 62'	Stadium: The Hawthorns; Attendance: 25,615

7 September 1993 6	Watford	1–0	Wolverhampton Wanderers	Watford
19:45 BST	Venus 10' (o.g.)			Stadium: Vicarage Road; Attendance: 7,870

11 September 1993 7	Wolverhampton Wanderers	1–1	Portsmouth	Wolverhampton
15:00 BST	Kelly 47'		Durnin 64'	Stadium: Molineux; Attendance: 19,019

18 September 1993 8	Sunderland	0–2	Wolverhampton Wanderers	Sunderland
15:00 BST			Small 15'; Thomas 88'	Stadium: Roker Park; Attendance: 18,292

25 September 1993 9	Grimsby Town	2–0	Wolverhampton Wanderers	Cleethorpes
15:00 BST	Childs 35'; Mendonca 80'			Stadium: Blundell Park; Attendance: 6,310

2 October 1993 10	Wolverhampton Wanderers	1–1	Charlton Athletic	Wolverhampton
15:00 BST	Keen 60'		Chapple 88'	Stadium: Molineux; Attendance: 16,907

17 October 1993 11	Crystal Palace	1–1	Wolverhampton Wanderers	London
14:55 BST	Humphrey 44'		Kelly 7'	Stadium: Selhurst Park; Attendance: 13,056

23 October 1993 12	Wolverhampton Wanderers	1–1	Stoke City	Wolverhampton
15:00 BST	Kelly 24'		Stein 33'	Stadium: Molineux; Attendance: 20,421

30 October 1993 13	Southend United	1–1	Wolverhampton Wanderers	Southend-on-Sea
15:00 GMT	Jones 73'		Cook 80' (pen.)	Stadium: Roots Hall; Attendance: 8,071

2 November 1993 14	Wolverhampton Wanderers	3–0	Notts County	Wolverhampton
15:00 GMT	Birch 9'; Keen 67'; Bull 86'			Stadium: Molineux; Attendance: 15,989

7 November 1993 15	Derby County	0–4	Wolverhampton Wanderers	Derby
14:55 GMT			Bull 19', 60', 68'; Keen 90'	Stadium: Baseball Ground; Attendance: 14,310

10 November 1993 16	Wolverhampton Wanderers	1–1	Nottingham Forest	Wolverhampton
19:30 GMT	Kelly 12'		Collymore 50'	Stadium: Molineux; Attendance: 21,621

13 November 1993 17	Wolverhampton Wanderers	1–1	Barnsley	Wolverhampton
15:00 GMT	Kelly 60'		Biggins 18'	Stadium: Molineux; Attendance: 18,355

27 November 1993 18	Leicester City	2–2	Wolverhampton Wanderers	Leicester
15:00 GMT	Roberts 56', 62'		Bull 29', 33'	Stadium: Filbert Street; Attendance: 18,395

5 December 1993 19	Wolverhampton Wanderers	2–2	Derby County	Wolverhampton
14:55 GMT	Bull 45'; Kelly 90'		Gabbiadini 40', 62'	Stadium: Molineux; Attendance: 16,900

11 December 1993 20	Wolverhampton Wanderers	2–0	Watford	Wolverhampton
15:00 GMT	Bull 25'; Dennison 33'			Stadium: Molineux; Attendance: 17,460

18 December 1993 21	Bristol City	2–1	Wolverhampton Wanderers	Bristol
15:00 GMT	Allison 29'; Brown 72'		Kelly 89'	Stadium: Ashton Gate; Attendance: 15,151

27 December 1993 22	Tranmere Rovers	1–1	Wolverhampton Wanderers	Birkenhead
15:00 GMT	Irons 1'		Bull 61'	Stadium: Prenton Park; Attendance: 15,603

28 December 1993 23	Wolverhampton Wanderers	2–1	Oxford United	Wolverhampton
15:00 GMT	Cook 85' (pen.); Keen 86'		Elliott 80'	Stadium: Molineux; Attendance: 25,908

1 January 1994 24	Peterborough United	0–1	Wolverhampton Wanderers	Peterborough
15:00 GMT			Regis 89'	Stadium: London Road; Attendance: 10,298

3 January 1994 25	Wolverhampton Wanderers	1–0	Bolton Wanderers	Wolverhampton
15:00 GMT	Dennison 21'			Stadium: Molineux; Attendance: 24,053

15 January 1994 26	Wolverhampton Wanderers	2–0	Crystal Palace	Wolverhampton
15:00 GMT	Thompson 42' (pen.); Keen 78'			Stadium: Molineux; Attendance: 23,851

23 January 1994 27	Nottingham Forest	0–0	Wolverhampton Wanderers	Nottingham
14:55 GMT				Stadium: City Ground; Attendance: 23,008

5 February 1994 28	Stoke City	1–1	Wolverhampton Wanderers	Stoke-on-Trent
15:00 GMT	Overson 53'		Blades 37'	Stadium: Victoria Ground; Attendance: 22,579

12 February 1994 29	Wolverhampton Wanderers	0–1	Southend United	Wolverhampton
15:00 GMT			Jones 56'	Stadium: Molineux; Attendance: 22,774

22 February 1994 30	Wolverhampton Wanderers	3–0	Birmingham City	Wolverhampton
19:30 GMT	Regis 45'; Kelly 47'; Keen 90'			Stadium: Molineux; Attendance: 24,931

26 February 1994 31	Wolverhampton Wanderers	1–2	West Bromwich Albion	Wolverhampton
15:00 GMT	Keen 18'		Taylor 35'; Mardon 39'	Stadium: Molineux; Attendance: 28,039

5 March 1994 32	Middlesbrough	1–0	Wolverhampton Wanderers	Middlesbrough
15:00 GMT	Wilkinson 87'			Stadium: Ayresome Park; Attendance: 12,092

15 March 1994 33	Portsmouth	3–0	Wolverhampton Wanderers	Portsmouth
19:45 GMT	Chamberlain 35'; Creaney 61', 82'			Stadium: Fratton Park; Attendance: 7,840

19 March 1994 34	Wolverhampton Wanderers	0–0	Grimsby Town	Wolverhampton
15:00 GMT				Stadium: Molineux; Attendance: 20,224

26 March 1994 35	Charlton Athletic	0–1	Wolverhampton Wanderers	London
15:00 GMT			Whittingham 10'	Stadium: The Valley; Attendance: 8,416

29 March 1994 36	Bolton Wanderers	1–3	Wolverhampton Wanderers	Bolton
19:30 BST	McGinlay 50'		Whittingham 25', 76'; Thompson 56'	Stadium: Burnden Park; Attendance: 12,405

2 April 1994 37	Wolverhampton Wanderers	2–1	Tranmere Rovers	Wolverhampton
15:00 BST	Whittingham 20'; Mills 83'		Aldridge 73'	Stadium: Molineux; Attendance: 26,592

4 April 1994 38	Oxford United	4–0	Wolverhampton Wanderers	Oxford
15:00 BST	Byrne 25'; Venus 36' (o.g.); Moody 42'; Elliott 62'			Stadium: Manor Ground; Attendance: 10,423

9 April 1994 39	Wolverhampton Wanderers	1–1	Peterborough United	Wolverhampton
15:00 BST	Whittingham 26'		McGlashan 16'	Stadium: Molineux; Attendance: 23,676

12 April 1994 40	Luton Town	0–2	Wolverhampton Wanderers	Luton
19:45 BST			Burke 23'; Whittingham 47'	Stadium: Kenilworth Road; Attendance: 8,545

16 April 1994 41	Notts County	0–2	Wolverhampton Wanderers	Nottingham
15:00 BST			Thompson 54' (pen.); Whittingham 89'	Stadium: Meadow Lane; Attendance: 13,438

20 April 1994 42	Millwall	1–0	Wolverhampton Wanderers	London
19:45 BST	Mitchell 84'			Stadium: The New Den; Attendance: 11,883

23 April 1994 43	Wolverhampton Wanderers	1–0	Luton Town	Wolverhampton
15:00 BST	Whittingham 42'			Stadium: Molineux; Attendance: 25,479

30 April 1994 44	Barnsley	2–0	Wolverhampton Wanderers	Barnsley
15:00 BST	O'Connell 55'; Payton 65'			Stadium: Oakwell; Attendance: 11,329

3 May 1994 45	Wolverhampton Wanderers	1–1	Sunderland	Wolverhampton
19:30 BST	Bull 30'		Goodman 36'	Stadium: Molineux; Attendance: 25,079

8 May 1994 46	Wolverhampton Wanderers	1–1	Leicester City	Wolverhampton
15:00 BST	Kelly 75'		Coatsworth 26'	Stadium: Molineux; Attendance: 27,229

Final table

Pos	Team	Pld	W	D	L	GF	GA	GD	Pts
5	Tranmere Rovers	46	21	9	16	69	53	+16	72
6	Derby County	46	20	11	15	73	68	+5	71
7	Notts County	46	20	8	18	65	69	–4	68
8	Wolverhampton Wanderers	46	17	17	12	60	47	+13	68
9	Middlesbrough	46	18	13	15	66	54	+12	67
10	Stoke City	46	18	13	15	57	59	–2	67

Source: Statto.com

Results summary

Overall								Home						Away					
Pld	W	D	L	GF	GA	GD	Pts	W	D	L	GF	GA	GD	W	D	L	GF	GA	GD
46	17	17	12	60	47	+13	68	10	10	3	34	19	+15	7	7	9	26	28	−2

Source: Statto.com

Results by round

Round	1	2	3	4	5	6	7	8	9	10	11	12	13	14	15	16	17	18	19	20	21	22	23	24	25	26	27	28	29	30	31	32	33	34	35	36	37	38	39	40	41	42	43	44	45	46
Result	W	D	W	L	L	L	D	W	L	D	D	D	D	W	W	D	D	D	D	W	L	D	W	W	W	W	D	D	L	W	L	L	L	D	W	W	W	L	D	W	W	L	W	L	D	D
Position	2	7	3	4	8	8	7	6	8	8	16	17	18	12	12	12	11	12	13	12	12	12	12	12	10	7	8	8	9	9	9	10	13	15	13	10	8	10	11	8	9	9	8	8	8	8

Source: Statto.com
W = Win; D = Draw; L = Loss

=== FA Cup ===
8 January 1994 R3	Wolverhampton Wanderers	1–0	Crystal Palace	Wolverhampton
15:00 GMT	Kelly 74'			Stadium: Molineux; Attendance: 25,047

29 January 1994 R4	Port Vale	0–2	Wolverhampton Wanderers	Burslem
15:00 GMT			Blades 25'; Keen 89'	Stadium: Vale Park; Attendance: 21,996

19 February 1994 R5	Wolverhampton Wanderers	1–1	Ipswich Town	Wolverhampton
15:00 GMT	Kelly 81'		Wark 28'	Stadium: Molineux; Attendance: 28,234

2 March 1994 R5 rep.	Ipswich Town	1–2	Wolverhampton Wanderers	Ipswich
19:45 GMT	Palmer 46'		Mills 8'; Thompson 38'	Stadium: Portman Road; Attendance: 19,385

13 March 1994 QF	Chelsea	1–0	Wolverhampton Wanderers	London
15:05 GMT	Peacock 58'			Stadium: Stamford Bridge; Attendance: 29,340

=== League Cup ===
22 September 1993 R2.1	Swindon Town	2–0	Wolverhampton Wanderers	Swindon
19:45 BST	Summerbee 20'; Mutch 67'			Stadium: County Ground; Attendance: 8,649

5 October 1993 R2.2	Wolverhampton Wanderers	2–1 (2–3 agg.)	Swindon Town	Wolverhampton
19:30 BST	Mountfield 81'; Burke 88'		Summerbee 59'	Stadium: Molineux; Attendance: 11,756

=== Anglo-Italian Cup ===
Wolves played in Group 5 of the preliminary round alongside two other domestic First Division clubs. The winner of the group would advance to the main group stage to play both English and Italian opposition. However, Wolves finished in second place in this initial round and so were eliminated.

31 August 1993	Wolverhampton Wanderers	3–3	Stoke City	Wolverhampton
19:30 BST	Kelly 42'; Bull 79'; Keen 90'		Carruthers 23', 38'; Gleghorn 68'	Stadium: Molineux; Attendance: 9,092

14 September 1993	Birmingham City	2–2	Wolverhampton Wanderers	Birmingham
19:45 BST	Wratten 68', 76'		Burke 65'; Mills 85'	Stadium: St Andrew's; Attendance: 2,710

== Players ==
Key:
‡ On loan from another club * First appearance(s) for the club

- # = Squad number
- Pos = Playing position
- P = Number of games played 10
- G = Number of goals scored
- GK = Goalkeeper
- DF = Defender
- MF = Midfielder
- FW = Forward
- = Yellow cards
- = Red cards
- † Permanent player left club during the season
- ¤ Loaned to another club for part or all of season

Correct as of end of season. Starting appearances are listed first, followed by substitute appearances in parentheses where applicable.

Pos	Name	P	G	P	G	P	G	P	G	P	G	A yellow card	A red card	Notes
Pos	Name	League		FA Cup		League Cup		Other		Total		Discipline		Notes
GK	(Wales) David Felgate †	0	0	0	0	0	0	0	0	0	0	0	0	
GK	(Wales) Paul Jones	0	0	0	0	0	0	0	0	0	0	0	0	
GK	(England) Mike Stowell	46	0	5	0	2	0	2	0	55	0	0	0	
DF	(England) Kevin Ashley	0	0	0	0	0	0	1	0	1	0	0	0	
DF	(England) Paul Blades	35	1	5	1	1	0	2	0	43	2	0	0	
DF	(England) Paul Edwards †	10(1)	0	0	0	0	0	0	0	10(1)	0	0	0	
DF	(England) Lawrie Madden †	0	0	0	0	0	0	0	0	0	0	0	0	
DF	(Northern Ireland) Neil Masters	4	0	0	0	0	0	0	0	4	0	0	0	
DF	(England) Derek Mountfield	17(2)	1	0	0	2	1	0	0	19(2)	2	0	0	
DF	(England) Peter Shirtliff (c)	39	0	5	0	2	0	1	0	47	0	0	0	
DF	(England) Darren Simkin	7(1)	0	0	0	1	0	0	0	8(1)	0	0	0	
DF	(England) Andy Thompson	36(1)	3	5	1	0	0	1	0	42(1)	4	0	0	
DF	(England) Mark Venus	38(1)	1	5	0	2	0	2	0	47(1)	1	0	0	
MF	(Scotland) Tom Bennett	8(2)	0	0	0	0	0	0	0	8(2)	0	0	0	
MF	(England) Paul Birch	25(7)	1	0	0	1	0	2	0	28(7)	1	0	0	
MF	(England) Mark Burke ¤	10(2)	1	0	0	2	1	2	1	14(2)	3	0	0	
MF	(England) Paul Cook	34(2)	2	1(2)	0	1	0	0(1)	0	36(5)	2	0	0	
MF	(Northern Ireland) Robbie Dennison	10(4)	2	2(1)	0	0	0	0	0	12(5)	2	0	0	
MF	(Scotland) Darren Ferguson	12(2)	0	4	0	0	0	0	0	16(2)	0	0	0	
MF	(England) Kevin Keen	36(5)	7	5	1	2	0	2	1	45(5)	9	0	0	
MF	(England) Jimmy Kelly ¤	4	0	0	0	1	0	0	0	5	0	0	0	
MF	(England) Chris Marsden	8	0	3	0	0	0	0	0	11	0	0	0	
MF	(England) Mark Rankine	28(3)	0	5	0	1	0	2	0	36(3)	0	0	0	
MF	(England) Geoff Thomas	8	4	0	0	0	0	2	0	10	4	0	0	
MF	(England) Mark Turner	0	0	0	0	0	0	0	0	0	0	0	0	
FW	(England) Shaun Bradbury ¤	0	0	0	0	0	0	0	0	0	0	0	0	
FW	(England) Steve Bull	27	14	2	0	0	0	0(1)	1	29(1)	15	0	0	
FW	(Republic of Ireland) David Kelly	35(1)	11	5	2	2	0	1	1	43(1)	14	0	0	
FW	(England) Lee Mills	6(8)	1	1	1	1	0	1	1	9(8)	3	0	0	
FW	(England) Andy Mutch †	0	0	0	0	0	0	0	0	0	0	0	0	
FW	(England) Cyrille Regis	8(11)	2	1(2)	0	0	0	1	0	10(13)	2	0	0	
FW	(England) Darren Roberts ¤	0	0	0	0	0	0	0	0	0	0	0	0	
FW	(England) Mike Small ‡	2(1)	1	0	0	1	0	0	0	3(1)	1	0	0	
FW	(England) Guy Whittingham ‡	13	8	1	0	0	0	0	0	14	8	0	0	

Source: Wolverhampton Wanderers: The Complete Record

== Transfers ==
=== In ===
Date	Player	From	Fee
18 June 1993	(England) Geoff Thomas	Crystal Palace	£800,000
23 June 1993	(Republic of Ireland) David Kelly	Newcastle United	£750,000
7 July 1993	(England) Kevin Keen	West Ham United	£600,000
3 August 1993	(England) Cyrille Regis	Aston Villa	£600,000
12 August 1993	(Wales) David Felgate	Bolton Wanderers	Free
18 August 1993	(England) Peter Shirtliff	Sheffield Wednesday	£250,000
22 December 1993	(Northern Ireland) Neil Masters	Bournemouth	£300,000
7 January 1994	(England) Chris Marsden	Huddersfield Town	£250,000
12 January 1994	(Scotland) Darren Ferguson	Manchester United	£250,000

=== Out ===
Date	Player	To	Fee
July 1993	(England) Rob Hindmarch	Telford United	Free
July 1993	(England) Colin Taylor	Telford United	Free
16 July 1993	(England) Tim Steele	Bradford City	Free
22 July 1993	(England) Keith Downing	Birmingham City	Free
16 August 1993	(England) Andy Mutch	Swindon Town	£250,000
3 September 1993	(England) Lawrie Madden	Darlington	Free
1 October 1993	(Wales) David Felgate	Chester City	Free
19 January 1994	(England) Paul Edwards	West Bromwich Albion	£55,000

=== Loans in ===
Start date	Player	From	End date
15 September 1993	(England) Mike Small	West Ham United	October 1993
11 March 1994	(England) Guy Whittingham	Aston Villa	End of season

=== Loans out ===
Start date	Player	From	End date
January 1994	(England) Jimmy Kelly	(Wales) Wrexham	End of season
4 March 1994	(England) Mark Burke	Luton Town	March 1994
18 March 1994	(England) Darren Roberts	Hereford United	End of season

== Management and coaching staff ==
Position	Name
Manager	Graham Turner (until 16 March), then Peter Shirtliff as caretaker manager, then Graham Taylor (from 29 March onward)
First team coach	Garry Pendrey (until 16 March)
Director of Youth School of Excellence	Rob Kelly
Youth Team Coach	Chris Evans
Club doctors	Dr Tweddell and Dr Peter Bekenn
Club Physio	Paul Darby

== Kit ==
The season brought a new home kit as the design returned to a plain gold shirt with black collar. The away kit, a bright blue shirt with black bands and gold trim on the upper arms, was retained from the previous season. Both were manufactured by the club's own "Molineux" label and sponsored by Goodyear.
