= 1990–91 Wolverhampton Wanderers F.C. season =

English football club season

Wolverhampton Wanderers
1990–91 season
- Chairman: Jack Harris
- Manager: Graham Turner
- Stadium: Molineux Stadium
- Second Division: 12th
- FA Cup: 3rd Round
- League Cup: 2nd Round
- Full Members Cup: 2nd round
- Top goalscorer: League: Steve Bull (26); All: Steve Bull (27)
- Highest home attendance: 22,982 (vs West Brom, 6 April 1991)
- Lowest home attendance: 9,313 (vs Hull, 20 April 1991)
- Average home league attendance: 15,834 (league only)

The 1990–91 season was the 92nd season of competitive league football in the history of English football club Wolverhampton Wanderers. They played in the second tier of the English football system, the Football League Second Division. The team finished in 12th place after a poor run of form at the end of the season brought only two victories from the final fifteen matches.

This was the first season – of an eventual seventeen – for the club under the ownership of Sir Jack Hayward, who had purchased it in May 1990 for £2.1 million.

== Results ==
=== Football League Second Division ===
A total of 24 teams competed in the Football League Second Division in the 1990–91 season. Each team played every other team twice: once at their stadium, and once at the opposition's. Three points were awarded to teams for each win, one point per draw, and none for defeats.

==== League table ====
Pos	Team	Pld	W	D	L	GF	GA	GD	Pts
10	Oxford United	46	14	19	13	69	66	+3	61
11	Newcastle United	46	14	17	15	49	56	−7	59
12	Wolverhampton Wanderers	46	13	19	14	63	63	0	58
13	Bristol Rovers	46	15	13	18	56	59	−3	58
14	Ipswich Town	46	13	18	15	60	68	−8	57

Rules for classification: 1) Points; 2) Goal difference; 3) Goals scored

==== Results summary ====
Overall								Home						Away					
Pld	W	D	L	GF	GA	GD	Pts	W	D	L	GF	GA	GD	W	D	L	GF	GA	GD
46	13	19	14	63	63	0	58	11	6	6	45	35	+10	2	13	8	18	28	−10

Source: Statto.com

==== Results by round ====
Round	1	2	3	4	5	6	7	8	9	10	11	12	13	14	15	16	17	18	19	20	21	22	23	24	25	26	27	28	29	30	31	32	33	34	35	36	37	38	39	40	41	42	43	44	45	46
Result	L	W	D	D	D	L	W	D	W	W	D	W	W	L	D	W	L	D	D	L	W	D	D	D	L	D	W	D	W	D	W	L	L	D	L	D	W	L	D	L	L	L	D	L	D	W
Position	15	10	8	12	13	17	13	12	8	6	7	5	4	5	6	5	5	5	5	6	6	6	6	7	8	8	8	9	8	8	5	7	8	9	10	10	10	10	10	10	12	12	13	14	15	12

Source: Statto.com
W = Win; D = Draw; L = Loss

==== Matches ====
25 August 1990 1	Wolverhampton Wanderers	2–3	Oldham Athletic	Wolverhampton
15:00 BST	Bull 6', 48'		Marshall 11', 81', 82'	Stadium: Molineux; Attendance: 20,864

28 August 1990 2	Port Vale	1–2	Wolverhampton Wanderers	Burslem
19:30 BST	Beckford 7' (pen.)		Bellamy 23'; Bull 43'	Stadium: Vale Park; Attendance: 12,349

1 September 1990 3	Brighton & Hove Albion	1–1	Wolverhampton Wanderers	Hove
15:00 BST	Small 65' (pen.)		Cook 23'	Stadium: Goldstone Ground; Attendance: 9,820

8 September 1990 4	Wolverhampton Wanderers	1–1	Bristol Rovers	Wolverhampton
15:00 BST	Dennison 5'		Holloway 37'	Stadium: Molineux; Attendance: 17,912

15 September 1990 5	West Ham United	1–1	Wolverhampton Wanderers	London
15:00 BST	Martin 2'		Bull 72'	Stadium: Upton Park; Attendance: 23,241

18 September 1990 6	Swindon Town	1–0	Wolverhampton Wanderers	Swindon
19:30 BST	Simpson 61'			Stadium: County Ground; Attendance: 12,228

22 September 1990 7	Wolverhampton Wanderers	3–1	Plymouth Argyle	Wolverhampton
15:00 BST	Bull 35', 43'; Mutch 44'		Turner 25'	Stadium: Molineux; Attendance: 15,137

29 September 1990 8	Oxford United	1–1	Wolverhampton Wanderers	Oxford
15:00 BST	Simpson 3'		Dennison 10'	Stadium: Manor Ground; Attendance: 7,418

2 October 1990 9	Wolverhampton Wanderers	3–0	Charlton Athletic	Wolverhampton
19:30 BST	Bull 12', 89'; Thompson 58'			Stadium: Molineux; Attendance: 14,363

6 October 1990 10	Wolverhampton Wanderers	4–0	Bristol City	Wolverhampton
15:00 BST	Thompson 3'; Bull 16', 67', 80'			Stadium: Molineux; Attendance: 17,891

13 October 1990 11	Notts County	1–1	Wolverhampton Wanderers	Nottingham
15:00 BST	Thomas 89'		Westley 31'	Stadium: Meadow Lane; Attendance: 12,872

20 October 1990 12	Hull City	1–2	Wolverhampton Wanderers	Kingston upon Hull
15:00 BST	Payton 63'		Bull 7'; Dennison 56'	Stadium: Boothferry Park; Attendance: 7,144

23 October 1990 13	Wolverhampton Wanderers	1–0	Middlesbrough	Wolverhampton
19:30 BST	Bull 61'			Stadium: Molineux; Attendance: 17,285

27 October 1990 14	Wolverhampton Wanderers	2–3	Blackburn Rovers	Wolverhampton
15:00 BST	Cook 58'; Steele 71'		Stapleton 5', 13', 77'	Stadium: Molineux; Attendance: 17,776

3 November 1990 15	Portsmouth	0–0	Wolverhampton Wanderers	Portsmouth
15:00 GMT				Stadium: Fratton Park; Attendance: 14,574

10 November 1990 16	Wolverhampton Wanderers	2–1	Newcastle United	Wolverhampton
15:00 GMT	Steele 2'; Bellamy 53'		Clark 27'	Stadium: Molineux; Attendance: 18,721

17 November 1990 17	Leicester City	1–0	Wolverhampton Wanderers	Leicester
15:00 GMT	Kelly 38'			Stadium: Filbert Street; Attendance: 16,574

24 November 1990 18	Barnsley	1–1	Wolverhampton Wanderers	Barnsley
15:00 GMT	Saville 31'		Cook 36'	Stadium: Oakwell; Attendance: 9,267

1 December 1990 19	Wolverhampton Wanderers	2–2	Ipswich Town	Wolverhampton
15:00 GMT	Bull 4', 78'		Dozzell 41'; Redford 44'	Stadium: Molineux; Attendance: 15,803

15 December 1990 20	Oldham Athletic	4–1	Wolverhampton Wanderers	Oldham
15:00 GMT	Barrett 44'; Ritchie 59'; Palmer 64', 87'		Thompson 16'	Stadium: Boundary Park; Attendance: 11,587

22 December 1990 21	Wolverhampton Wanderers	4–1	Millwall	Wolverhampton
15:00 GMT	Bellamy 4'; Bull 43'; Taylor 74', 83'		Sheringham 22'	Stadium: Molineux; Attendance: 14,504

26 December 1990 22	Sheffield Wednesday	2–2	Wolverhampton Wanderers	Sheffield
15:00 GMT	McCall 6'; Palmer 25'		Cook 72'; Bull 84'	Stadium: Hillsborough; Attendance: 29,686

29 December 1990 23	West Bromwich Albion	1–1	Wolverhampton Wanderers	West Bromwich
15:00 GMT	Bannister 57'		Hindmarch 90'	Stadium: The Hawthorns; Attendance: 28,497

1 January 1991 24	Wolverhampton Wanderers	0–0	Watford	Wolverhampton
15:00 GMT				Stadium: Molineux; Attendance: 18,159

12 January 1991 25	Wolverhampton Wanderers	2–3	Brighton & Hove Albion	Wolverhampton
15:00 GMT	Bull 18'; Mutch 76'		Wade 17'; Codner 33'; Barham 81'	Stadium: Molineux; Attendance: 12,688

19 January 1991 26	Bristol Rovers	1–1	Wolverhampton Wanderers	Bath
15:00 GMT	Saunders 25'		Twentyman 21' (o.g.)	Stadium: Twerton Park; Attendance: 6,042

2 February 1991 27	Wolverhampton Wanderers	2–1	West Ham United	Wolverhampton
15:00 GMT	Birch 44'; Bull 48'		McAvennie 57'	Stadium: Molineux; Attendance: 19,454

23 February 1991 28	Newcastle United	0–0	Wolverhampton Wanderers	Newcastle upon Tyne
15:00 GMT				Stadium: St James' Park; Attendance: 18,612

26 February 1991 29	Wolverhampton Wanderers	3–1	Port Vale	Wolverhampton
19:30 GMT	Bull 30', 42'; Mutch 70'		Earle 20'	Stadium: Molineux; Attendance: 15,919

2 March 1991 30	Ipswich Town	0–0	Wolverhampton Wanderers	Ipswich
15:00 GMT				Stadium: Portman Road; Attendance: 13,350

5 March 1991 31	Wolverhampton Wanderers	2–1	Leicester City	Wolverhampton
19:30 GMT	Bull 5'; Mutch 61'		Gibson 17'	Stadium: Molineux; Attendance: 15,707

9 March 1991 32	Wolverhampton Wanderers	0–5	Barnsley	Wolverhampton
15:00 GMT			Saville 5'; Rammell 19'; Stancliffe 25' (o.g.); Agnew 49'; Robinson 86'	Stadium: Molineux; Attendance: 15,671

12 March 1991 33	Charlton Athletic	1–0	Wolverhampton Wanderers	London
19:30 GMT	Grant 75'			Stadium: The Valley; Attendance: 6,853

16 March 1991 34	Wolverhampton Wanderers	3–3	Oxford United	Wolverhampton
15:00 GMT	Bull 10', 15', 23'		Melville 52'; Stein 88'; Simpson 89'	Stadium: Molineux; Attendance: 11,357

19 March 1991 35	Wolverhampton Wanderers	0–2	Notts County	Wolverhampton
19:30 GMT			Johnson 35'; Bartlett 40'	Stadium: Molineux; Attendance: 12,375

23 March 1991 36	Bristol City	1–1	Wolverhampton Wanderers	Bristol
15:00 GMT	Bryant 54'		Dennison 62'	Stadium: Ashton Gate; Attendance: 15,499

30 March 1991 37	Wolverhampton Wanderers	3–2	Sheffield Wednesday	Wolverhampton
15:00 GMT	Mutch 1', 12'; Bull 71'		Pearson 54', 86'	Stadium: Molineux; Attendance: 18,011

3 April 1991 38	Millwall	2–1	Wolverhampton Wanderers	London
19:30 BST	Stevens 28'; Sheringham 72'		Cook 13'	Stadium: The Den; Attendance: 13,708

6 April 1991 39	Wolverhampton Wanderers	2–2	West Bromwich Albion	Wolverhampton
15:00 BST	Dennison 15'; Mutch 75'		Goodman 35'; Ford 65'	Stadium: Molineux; Attendance: 22,982

9 April 1991 40	Plymouth Argyle	1–0	Wolverhampton Wanderers	Plymouth
19:30 BST	Hodges 64'			Stadium: Home Park; Attendance: 7,618

13 April 1991 41	Watford	3–1	Wolverhampton Wanderers	Watford
15:00 BST	Wilkinson 19', 66', 89'		Cook 77' (pen.)	Stadium: Vicarage Road; Attendance: 12,014

16 April 1991 42	Wolverhampton Wanderers	1–2	Swindon Town	Wolverhampton
19:30 BST	Hindmarch 15'		Shearer 38'; Hazard 79'	Stadium: Molineux; Attendance: 9,799

20 April 1991 43	Wolverhampton Wanderers	0–0	Hull City	Wolverhampton
15:00 BST				Stadium: Molineux; Attendance: 9,313

27 April 1991 44	Middlesbrough	2–0	Wolverhampton Wanderers	Middlesbrough
15:00 BST	Ripley 11'; Hendrie 82'			Stadium: Ayresome Park; Attendance: 16,447

4 May 1991 45	Blackburn Rovers	1–1	Wolverhampton Wanderers	Blackburn
15:00 BST	Livingstone 30'		Paskin 42'	Stadium: Ewood Park; Attendance: 9,560

11 May 1991 46	Wolverhampton Wanderers	3–1	Portsmouth	Wolverhampton
15:00 BST	Birch 37'; Mutch 68'; Downing 89'		Clarke 75'	Stadium: Molineux; Attendance: 12,570

=== FA Cup ===
5 January 1991 R3	Wolverhampton Wanderers	0–1	Cambridge United	Wolverhampton
15:00 GMT			Leadbitter 76'	Stadium: Molineux; Attendance: 15,100

=== League Cup ===
25 September 1990 R2.1	Hull City	0–0	Wolverhampton Wanderers	Kingston upon Hull
19:30 BST				Stadium: Boothferry Park; Attendance: 5,283

9 October 1990 R2.2	Wolverhampton Wanderers	1–1 (a.e.t.) (1–1 agg.)	Hull City	Wolverhampton
19:30 BST	Steele 12'		Swan 30'	Stadium: Molineux; Attendance: 14,954

Hull City won on away goals.

=== Full Members Cup ===
27 November 1990 R1	Leicester City	0–1	Wolverhampton Wanderers	Leicester
19:35 GMT			Bull 9'	Stadium: Filbert Street; Attendance: 4,705

19 December 1990 R2	Wolverhampton Wanderers	1–2	Leeds United	Wolverhampton
19:30 GMT	Cook 60'		Varadi 21'; McAllister 74'	Stadium: Molineux; Attendance: 11,080

== Players ==
Key:
‡ On loan from another club * First appearance(s) for the club

- # = Squad number
- Pos = Playing position
- P = Number of games played 10
- G = Number of goals scored
- GK = Goalkeeper
- DF = Defender
- MF = Midfielder
- FW = Forward
- = Yellow cards
- = Red cards
- † Permanent player left club during the season
- ¤ Loaned to another club for part or all of season

Correct as of end of season. Starting appearances are listed first, followed by substitute appearances in parentheses where applicable.

Pos	Name	P	G	P	G	P	G	P	G	P	G	A yellow card	A red card	Notes
Pos	Name	League		FA Cup		League Cup		Other		Total		Discipline		Notes
GK	(England) Vince Bartram ¤	4	0	0	0	0	0	0	0	4	0	0	0	
GK	(England) Tony Lange ¤	3	0	0	0	0	0	0	0	3	0	0	0	
GK	(England) Mike Stowell	39	0	1	0	2	0	2	0	44	0	0	0	
DF	(England) Kevin Ashley	15(1)	0	0(1)	0	0	0	0	0	15(2)	0	0	1	
DF	(England) Gary Bellamy	26	3	1	0	2	0	2	0	31	3	0	0	
DF	(England) Nicky Clarke	10(4)	0	0	0	0	0	0	0	10(4)	0	0	0	
DF	(England) Rob Hindmarch	40	2	1	0	2	0	0(1)	0	43(1)	2	0	0	
DF	(England) Brian Roberts	17(4)	0	1	0	0	0	2	0	20(4)	0	0	0	
DF	(England) Paul Stancliffe ‡	17	0	1	0	0	0	2	0	20	0	0	0	
DF	(England) Andy Thompson	43(1)	3	1	0	2	0	2	0	48(1)	3	0	0	
DF	(England) Mark Venus	6	0	0	0	0	0	0	0	6	0	0	0	
DF	(England) Shane Westley	5	1	0	0	2	0	0	0	7	1	0	0	
MF	(Scotland) Tom Bennett	24(2)	0	1	0	2	0	0(1)	0	27(3)	0	0	0	
MF	(England) Paul Birch	20	2	0	0	0	0	0	0	20	2	0	0	
MF	(England) Mark Blake ‡	2	0	0	0	0	0	0	0	2	0	0	0	
MF	(England) Mark Burke	3(3)	0	0	0	0	0	0	0	3(3)	0	0	0	
MF	(England) Paul Cook	42	6	0	0	2	0	2	1	46	7	0	1	
MF	(Northern Ireland) Robbie Dennison	41(1)	5	1	0	1(1)	0	2	0	45(2)	5	0	0	
MF	(England) Keith Downing	31	1	0	0	2	0	2	0	35	1	0	0	
MF	(England) Paul Jones	0(1)	0	0	0	0	0	0	0	0(1)	0	0	0	
MF	(England) Tim Steele	22(6)	2	1	0	2	1	2	0	27(6)	3	0	0	
MF	(Northern Ireland) Mark Todd ‡	6(1)	0	0	0	0	0	0	0	6(1)	0	0	0	
FW	(England) Steve Bull	43	26	1	0	2	0	2	1	48	27	0	0	
FW	(England) Paul McLoughlin	2(4)	0	0	0	0(1)	0	0	0	2(5)	0	0	0	
FW	(England) Andy Mutch	29	8	0(1)	0	0	0	0	0	29(1)	8	0	0	
FW	(South Africa) John Paskin	10(5)	1	1	0	1	0	0	0	12(5)	1	0	0	
FW	(England) Colin Taylor	6(9)	2	0	0	0(2)	0	2	0	8(11)	2	0	0	

Source: Wolverhampton Wanderers: The Complete Record

== Transfers ==
=== In ===
Date	Player	From	Fee
June 1990	(England) Brian Roberts	Birmingham City	Free
19 June 1990	(England) Rob Hindmarch	Derby County	£325,000
28 June 1990	(England) Mike Stowell	Everton	£250,000
13 September 1990	(England) Kevin Ashley	Birmingham City	£500,000
December 1990	(England) Paul Stancliffe	Sheffield United	Free
1 February 1991	(England) Paul Birch	Aston Villa	£400,000
14 March 1991	(England) Mark Burke	Middlesbrough	£25,000

=== Out ===
Date	Player	To	Fee
May 1990	(Wales) Mark Kendall	Swansea City	Free
May 1990	(Jamaica) Floyd Streete	Reading	Free
June 1990	(Scotland) Ally Robertson	Released	Free
July 1990	(Wales) Nigel Vaughan	Hereford United	Free

=== Loans in ===
Start date	Player	From	End date
November 1990	(England) Paul Stancliffe	Sheffield United	December 1990
17 January 1991	(England) Mark Blake	Aston Villa	
March 1991	(Northern Ireland) Mark Todd	Sheffield United	

=== Loans out ===
Start date	Player	To	End date
?	(England) Tony Lange	Aldershot	
20 February 1991	(England) Vince Bartram	West Bromwich Albion	8 April 1991

== Management and coaching staff ==
Position	Name
Manager	Graham Turner
Coach	Garry Pendrey, Barry Powell
Club doctors	Dr Tweddell and Dr Peter Bekenn
Club Physio	Paul Darby
