= Mike Stowell =

English footballer

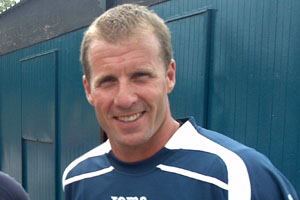
- Stowell pictured in July 2009.

Personal information
- Full name: Michael Stowell
- Date of birth: 19 April 1965 (age 61)
- Place of birth: Preston, Lancashire, England
- Height: 6 ft 2 in (1.88 m)
- Position: Goalkeeper

Team information
- Current team: Plymouth Argyle (goalkeeping coach)

Youth career
- 1984–1985: Leyland Motors

Senior career*
Years	Team	Apps	(Gls)
1985	Preston North End	0	(0)
1985–1990	Everton	0	(0)
1987	→ Chester City (loan)	14	(0)
1987	→ York City (loan)	6	(0)
1988	→ Manchester City (loan)	14	(0)
1988	→ Port Vale (loan)	7	(0)
1989	→ Wolverhampton Wanderers (loan)	7	(0)
1990	→ Preston North End (loan)	2	(0)
1990–2001	Wolverhampton Wanderers	378	(0)
2001–2005	Bristol City	25	(0)
Total		453	(0)

Managerial career
- 2007: Leicester City (caretaker)
- 2010: Leicester City (caretaker)
- 2011: Leicester City (caretaker)
- 2017: Leicester City (joint-caretaker)
- 2019: Leicester City (joint-caretaker)
- 2023: Leicester City (joint-caretaker)
- * Club domestic league appearances and goals

Michael Stowell (born 19 April 1965) is an English football coach and former professional player who is the goalkeeping coach at EFL League One club Plymouth Argyle. As a player, he spent 20 years as a professional goalkeeper, 11 of which were with Wolverhampton Wanderers. He is married to former England women's international footballer Rachel Stowell.

Gaining his chance in the professional game at Preston North End in 1985, he impressed enough to receive a contract with top-flight Everton later in the year. In his five years at the club, he was loaned out to Chester City, York City, Manchester City, Port Vale, Wolverhampton Wanderers, and Preston North End. He signed permanently with Wolves in 1990 and was their goalkeeper of choice throughout the decade, making 441 league and cup appearances. He was named as the club's Player of the Year in 1991. In July 2001, he signed with Bristol City before retiring in May 2005. He then became a coach at Leicester City and has had six separate spells as caretaker manager in 2007, 2010, 2011, 2017, 2019 and 2023.

== Playing career ==
=== Preston and Everton ===
Having played junior football for Kirkham Juniors as a centre-half, Stowell gained his first experience of professional football with a trial for Preston North End, where he played in their reserve team and was offered a one-year contract. He turned this down, though, as the club sat bottom of the Third Division. He was entering his final year's apprenticeship with BT in Preston, the town in which he was raised.

While playing for North West Counties League side Leyland Motors, he was offered a trial at First Division side Everton. Subsequently, he was offered a two-and-a-half-year contract by manager Howard Kendall. He signed in December 1985 for what turned out to be a five-year stay at Goodison Park. However, he could not force his way past Neville Southall into the first team and never made a league appearance, instead playing in the Central Reserve League. His sole outing for the "Toffees" came under the stewardship of Colin Harvey in a Full Members Cup tie against Millwall on 20 December 1988, in which he kept a clean sheet in a 2–0 victory.

The lack of first-team opportunities at Everton saw Stowell experiencing a string of loan moves to lower-league sides. In September 1987, he was loaned to Third Division Chester City, making his league debut in a 4–1 win over Aldershot on 5 September 1987. He made 15 further appearances for Harry McNally's "Seals" before joining Third Division rivals York City for a brief loan spell in December 1987. He played six league games under manager Bobby Saxton at Bootham Crescent. In February 1988, he joined Second Division club Manchester City on loan, playing 14 league and one FA Cup game for the club during the latter half of the 1988–89 season. "Citizens" manager Mel Machin allowed goalkeeper Eric Nixon to leave Maine Road on loan after securing Stowell's services for the rest of the campaign.

He joined Port Vale in a two-month loan deal in October 1988 as John Rudge needed cover for the injured Mark Grew. The "Valiants" struggled without their regular custodian, conceding eight goals in Stowell's first three appearances before he settled into his time at Vale Park and went unbeaten in the remainder of his league appearances. Wolverhampton Wanderers required his services from March 1989 to the end of the 1988–89 season. He kept goal in seven league games as Wolves ended up as Third Division champions. His final loan spell was with Preston North End in February 1990, and he played just the two Third Division games at Deepdale.

=== Wolverhampton Wanderers ===
Stowell's two-month loan spell at Wolverhampton in the spring of 1989 made a good impression on manager Graham Turner, who took him to Molineux permanently in July 1990 for a fee of £275,000. He was named Player of the Year for the 1990–91 season, ahead of fan favourite Steve Bull, after making a total of 44 appearances in his debut season. He featured 51 times in the 1991–92 campaign, though was limited to 29 appearances in the 1992–93 season, with back-up goalkeeper Paul Jones and loanee Dave Beasant filling in for the remainder. He became an ever-present throughout 1993–94, however, playing 55 matches as Wolves posted a fifth-successive mid-table finish in the Second Division. They improved to a fourth-place finish under new manager Graham Taylor in 1994–95, Stowell featuring 45 times, before being eliminated from the play-offs after losing the semi-finals 3–2 on aggregate to Bolton Wanderers. He played 46 games as Wolves declined in the 1995–96 season, causing Taylor to leave the club and be replaced by Mark McGhee. Stowell then featured 51 times in the 1996–97 campaign, with Wolves reaching third but again failing at the play-off semi-finals with a 4–3 aggregate defeat to Crystal Palace.

Though they only finished ninth in 1997–98, they did reach the semi-finals of the FA Cup; Stowell was on the bench in the semi-final, Dutchman Hans Segers was between the posts as Wolves lost 1–0 to Arsenal at Villa Park. Stowell made 52 appearances in the 1998–99 campaign as Wolves posted a seventh-place finish under new boss Colin Lee. However, he eventually lost his first-team place to Michael Oakes, who joined the club in October 1999, limiting Stowell to 20 appearances in the 1999–2000 season. He was given a testimonial match against Aston Villa in July 2000, and the following summer was released by the Midlanders. He was given a farewell appearance by Dave Jones as a substitute on the last day of the 2000–01 season, against Queens Park Rangers. He made a total of 441 league and cup appearances in his 11-year stay at Wolves and for the final three years he also worked as a goalkeeping coach at the club's youth academy.

=== Bristol City ===
Stowell joined Second Division side Bristol City on a free transfer in July 2001, having chosen them over Wrexham. He made 28 appearances for Danny Wilson's "Robins" throughout the 2001–02 campaign. Thereafter he was a reserve and part-time goalkeeping coach at Ashton Gate, and was an unused substitute at the Millennium Stadium in both the 2003 Football League Trophy final victory over Carlisle United and the 2004 play-off final defeat to Brighton & Hove Albion. He retired in May 2005, and turned down the offer of becoming an official goalkeeping coach at the club, having already found employment at Leicester City.

== Coaching career ==
Stowell spent the early part of his coaching career as, firstly, a goalkeeping coach, and then assistant manager at Leicester City, before being sacked alongside manager Rob Kelly on 11 April 2007. In July 2007, he was re-appointed goalkeeping coach at Leicester City by Kelly's replacement, Martin Allen. In August 2007, he took over (joint) managerial responsibility at Leicester, following Allen's sacking. He returned to his goalkeeping coaching role when the club appointed Allen's successor, Gary Megson, the following month. He resumed joint managerial duties at Leicester in October 2010, after the sacking of manager Paulo Sousa after less than three months in charge. He then resumed his role as goalkeeping coach. He was appointed caretaker manager for a second time in twelve months when Sven-Göran Eriksson was sacked in October 2011. After a win and two defeats, Nigel Pearson was re-appointed as Leicester manager and Stowell was made goalkeeping and first-team coach. He was at the King Power Stadium when the "Foxes" won the Premier League title in the 2015–16 season.

He took charge of the first-team for a fourth time on 23 February 2017, as joint caretaker manager with assistant manager Craig Shakespeare, following the sacking of Claudio Ranieri. He reverted to his position as goalkeeping and first-team coach after Shakespeare was confirmed as the club's new manager on 12 March. He once again was appointed caretaker manager, alongside Adam Sadler, following the departure of Claude Puel on 24 February 2019. Brendan Rodgers was named as Puel's successor three days later, taking charge shortly after Leicester beat Brighton & Hove Albion 2–1 in the Premier League. Stowell and Sadler again stood in as joint-caretaker managers after Rodgers was sacked on 2 April 2023. He left Leicester City on 30 June 2023 after the arrival of new manager Enzo Maresca.

In July 2023, Stowell joined Israeli Premier League side Maccabi Tel Aviv as a goalkeeping coach. He returned to the UK in June 2024 after Maccabi won the league title and reached the last 16 of the UEFA Europa Conference League. In October 2024, he was appointed goalkeeping coach at Bristol City Women on a short-term basis.

In October 2025, Stowell joined League One club Plymouth Argyle as goalkeeping coach.

== Personal life ==
He married Rachel McArthur in June 2009, who had given birth to his daughter the previous April.

== Career statistics ==
=== Playing statistics ===
Appearances and goals by club, season and competition
Club	Season	League			FA Cup		Other		Total	
Club	Season	Division	Apps	Goals	Apps	Goals	Apps	Goals	Apps	Goals
Preston North End	1984–85	Third Division	0	0	0	0	0	0	0	0
Everton	1985–86	First Division	0	0	0	0	0	0	0	0
Everton	1986–87	First Division	0	0	0	0	0	0	0	0
Everton	1987–88	First Division	0	0	0	0	0	0	0	0
Everton	1988–89	First Division	0	0	0	0	1	0	1	0
Everton	Total		0	0	0	0	1	0	1	0
Chester City (loan)	1987–88	Third Division	14	0	0	0	2	0	16	0
York City (loan)	1987–88	Third Division	6	0	0	0	0	0	6	0
Manchester City (loan)	1987–88	Second Division	14	0	1	0	0	0	15	0
Port Vale (loan)	1988–89	Third Division	7	0	0	0	1	0	8	0
Wolverhampton Wanderers (loan)	1988–89	Third Division	7	0	0	0	0	0	7	0
Preston North End (loan)	1989–90	Third Division	2	0	0	0	0	0	2	0
Wolverhampton Wanderers	1990–91	Second Division	39	0	1	0	4	0	44	0
Wolverhampton Wanderers	1991–92	Second Division	46	0	1	0	4	0	51	0
Wolverhampton Wanderers	1992–93	First Division	26	0	0	0	3	0	29	0
Wolverhampton Wanderers	1993–94	First Division	46	0	5	0	4	0	55	0
Wolverhampton Wanderers	1994–95	First Division	37	0	2	0	6	0	45	0
Wolverhampton Wanderers	1995–96	First Division	38	0	4	0	4	0	46	0
Wolverhampton Wanderers	1996–97	First Division	46	0	1	0	4	0	51	0
Wolverhampton Wanderers	1997–98	First Division	35	0	5	0	5	0	45	0
Wolverhampton Wanderers	1998–99	First Division	46	0	2	0	4	0	52	0
Wolverhampton Wanderers	1999–2000	First Division	18	0	0	0	2	0	20	0
Wolverhampton Wanderers	2000–01	First Division	1	0	1	0	1	0	3	0
Wolverhampton Wanderers	Total		378	0	22	0	41	0	441	0
Bristol City	2001–02	Second Division	25	0	1	0	2	0	28	0
Bristol City	2002–03	Second Division	0	0	0	0	0	0	0	0
Bristol City	2003–04	Second Division	0	0	0	0	1	0	1	0
Bristol City	Total		25	0	1	0	3	0	29	0
Career total			453	0	24	0	48	0	525	0

=== Managerial statistics ===
Managerial record by team and tenure
Team	From	To	Record				
Team	From	To	P	W	D	L	Win %
Leicester City (caretaker)	30 August 2007	13 September 2007	1	0	1	0	0.0
Leicester City (caretaker)	1 October 2010	4 October 2010	1	1	0	0	100.0
Leicester City (caretaker)	24 October 2011	15 November 2011	3	1	0	2	33.3
Leicester City (caretaker)	23 February 2017	12 March 2017	2	2	0	0	100.0
Leicester City (caretaker)	24 February 2019	26 February 2019	1	1	0	0	100.0
Leicester City (caretaker)	2 April 2023	10 April 2023	2	0	0	2	0.0
Total			10	5	1	4	50.0

== Honours ==
Wolverhampton Wanderers

- Football League Third Division: 1988–89

Bristol City

- Football League Trophy: 2002–03

Individual

- Wolverhampton Wanderers Player of the Year: 1990–91
