= Darren Roberts =

Darren Roberts is the name of:

- Darren Roberts (footballer) (born 1969), English footballer
- Darren Roberts (EastEnders), a fictional character in the BBC soap opera
