= 1997–98 Wolverhampton Wanderers F.C. season =

English football club season

Wolverhampton Wanderers
1997–98 season
- Chairman: Jonathan Hayward, then Sir Jack Hayward (from 7 September)
- Manager: Mark McGhee
- Football League First Division: 9th
- FA Cup: Semi-finals
- League Cup: 3rd round
- Top goalscorer: League: Robbie Keane (11); All: Dougie Freedman (13)
- Highest home attendance: 28,244 (vs West Brom, 31 January 1998)
- Lowest home attendance: 17,862 (vs Fulham, 24 September 1997)
- Average home league attendance: 23,277 (league only)

The 1997–98 season was the 99th season of competitive league football in the history of English football club Wolverhampton Wanderers. They played the season in the second tier of the English football system, the Football League First Division.

The team finished in ninth position in the league, failing to mount a serious promotion challenge after having finished third in the previous campaign. They did, however, reach the semi-finals of the FA Cup for the first time in nineteen years, where they lost to eventual double winners Arsenal.

== Results ==
=== Football League First Division ===
A total of 24 teams competed in the Football League First Division in the 1997–98 season. Each team played every other team twice: once at their stadium, and once at the opposition's. Three points were awarded to teams for each win, one point per draw, and none for defeats. Teams finishing level on points were firstly divided by the number of goals scored rather than goal difference.

The provisional fixture list was released on 16 June 1997, but was subject to change in the event of matches being selected for television coverage or police concerns.

9 August 1997 1	Norwich City	0–2	Wolverhampton Wanderers	Norwich
15:00 GMT		Report	Keane 34', 64'	Stadium: Carrow Road; Attendance: 17,230 (1,676 away); Referee: Mike Bailey

16 August 1997 2	Wolverhampton Wanderers	0–0	Sheffield United	Wolverhampton
15:00 BST		Report		Stadium: Molineux; Attendance: 23,102 (1,160 away); Referee: Paul Danson

24 August 1997 3	West Bromwich Albion	1–0	Wolverhampton Wanderers	West Bromwich
13:00 BST	Curle 16' (o.g.)	Report		Stadium: The Hawthorns; Attendance: 21,511 (5,030 away); Referee: Terry Heilbron

30 August 1997 4	Wolverhampton Wanderers	4–2	Bury	Wolverhampton
15:00 BST	Keane 5', 86'; Bull 42', 51'	Report	Battersby 19'; Johnson 61'	Stadium: Molineux; Attendance: 21,141 (803 away); Referee: George Cain

3 September 1997 5	Wolverhampton Wanderers	1–1	Port Vale	Wolverhampton
19:45 BST	Bull 74'	Report	Foyle 82'	Stadium: Molineux; Attendance: 21,524 (983 away); Referee: Andy Butler

7 September 1997 6	Oxford United	3–0	Wolverhampton Wanderers	Oxford
13:00 BST	Beauchamp 17', 71'; Ford 23'	Report		Stadium: Manor Ground; Attendance: 6,921 (1,900 away); Referee: Clive Wilkes

13 September 1997 7	Wolverhampton Wanderers	3–1	Charlton Athletic	Wolverhampton
15:00 BST	Bull 9', 35'; Froggatt 26'	Report	Chapple 72'	Stadium: Molineux; Attendance: 22,683 (1,179 away); Referee: Kevin Lynch

20 September 1997 8	Sunderland	1–1	Wolverhampton Wanderers	Sunderland
15:00 BST	Smith 17'	Report	Melville 34' (o.g.)	Stadium: Stadium of Light; Attendance: 30,682 (3,398 away); Referee: William Burns

27 September 1997 9	Wolverhampton Wanderers	1–1	Huddersfield Town	Wolverhampton
15:00 BST	Bull 1'	Report	Stewart 32'	Stadium: Molineux; Attendance: 21,723 (773 away); Referee: Rob Harris

4 October 1997 10	Bradford City	2–0	Wolverhampton Wanderers	Bradford
15:00 BST	Steiner 34'; Kulcsar 40'	Report		Stadium: Valley Parade; Attendance: 15,236 (1,800 away); Referee: Graham Laws

12 October 1997 11	Birmingham City	1–0	Wolverhampton Wanderers	Birmingham
16:00 BST	Marsden 8'	Report		Stadium: St Andrew's; Attendance: 17,822 (1,736 away); Referee: Mike Brandwood

18 October 1997 12	Wolverhampton Wanderers	3–1	Swindon Town	Wolverhampton
15:00 BST	Freedman 12'; Curle 78'; Simpson 80'	Report	Hay 24' (pen.)	Stadium: Molineux; Attendance: 21,794 (1,146 away); Referee: Chris Foy

22 October 1997 13	Wolverhampton Wanderers	2–1	Tranmere Rovers	Wolverhampton
19:45 BST	Robinson 15'; Freedman 16'	Report	Jones 65'	Stadium: Molineux; Attendance: 20,841 (690 away); Referee: Eddie Lomas

25 October 1997 14	Stockport County	1–0	Wolverhampton Wanderers	Stockport
15:00 BST	Cook 20'	Report		Stadium: Edgeley Park; Attendance: 9,804 (1,999 away); Referee: Roy Pearson

1 November 1997 15	Wolverhampton Wanderers	1–0	Middlesbrough	Wolverhampton
15:00 GMT	Keane 82'	Report		Stadium: Molineux; Attendance: 26,896 (2,922 away); Referee: Mike Pierce

4 November 1997 16	Crewe Alexandra	0–2	Wolverhampton Wanderers	Crewe
19:45 GMT		Report	Freedman 14'; Muscat 63'	Stadium: Gresty Road; Attendance: 5,743 (950 away); Referee: Andy D'Urso

8 November 1997 17	Stoke City	3–0	Wolverhampton Wanderers	Stoke-on-Trent
15:00 GMT	Kavanagh 8', 23' (pen.); Forsyth 60'	Report		Stadium: Britannia Stadium; Attendance: 18,490 (5,000 away); Referee: Eddie Wolstenholme

15 November 1997 18	Wolverhampton Wanderers	1–1	Ipswich Town	Wolverhampton
15:00 GMT	Keane 27'	Report	Tanner (penalty missed) 36'; Johnson 44'	Stadium: Molineux; Attendance: 21,937 (862 away); Referee: John Kirkby

29 November 1997 19	Wolverhampton Wanderers	3–2	Queens Park Rangers	Wolverhampton
15:00 GMT	Osborn 44'; Goodman 67', 77'	Report	Sheron 61'; Peacock 85'	Stadium: Molineux; Attendance: 23,645 (1,338 away); Referee: Brian Coddington

6 December 1997 20	Manchester City	0–1	Wolverhampton Wanderers	Manchester
15:00 GMT		Report	Symons 42' (o.g.)	Stadium: Maine Road; Attendance: 28,999 (2,024 away); Referee: Clive Wilkes

9 December 1997 21	Portsmouth	3–2	Wolverhampton Wanderers	Portsmouth
19:45 GMT	Durnin 14', 47'; Hillier 74'	Report	Curle (penalty missed) 42'; Westwood 76'; Froggatt 87'	Stadium: Fratton Park; Attendance: 8,042 (788 away); Referee: Steve Dorr

14 December 1997 22	Wolverhampton Wanderers	2–1	Nottingham Forest	Wolverhampton
13:00 GMT	Freedman 20'; Robinson 66'	Report	Johnson 84'	Stadium: Molineux; Attendance: 24,635 (3,018 away); Referee: Mike Bailey

20 December 1997 23	Reading	0–0	Wolverhampton Wanderers	Reading
15:00 GMT		Report		Stadium: Elm Park; Attendance: 11,715 (1,459 away); Referee: Steve Bennett

26 December 1997 24	Wolverhampton Wanderers	1–0	Oxford United	Wolverhampton
15:00 GMT	Goodman 19'	Report		Stadium: Molineux; Attendance: 26,238 (1,024 away); Referee: Phil Richards

28 December 1997 25	Port Vale	0–2	Wolverhampton Wanderers	Burslem
15:00 GMT		Report	Muscat 45'; Freedman 87'	Stadium: Vale Park; Attendance: 10,898 (2,177 away); Referee: Paul Taylor

10 January 1998 26	Wolverhampton Wanderers	5–0	Norwich City	Wolverhampton
15:00 GMT	Keane 22'; Goodman 24'; Freedman 43', 45', 77'	Report		Stadium: Molineux; Attendance: 23,703 (1,163 away); Referee: David Pugh

17 January 1998 27	Sheffield United	1–0	Wolverhampton Wanderers	Sheffield
15:00 GMT	Marcelo 39'	Report		Stadium: Bramall Lane; Attendance: 22,144 (1,933 away); Referee: William Burns

27 January 1998 28	Bury	1–3	Wolverhampton Wanderers	Bury
19:45 GMT	Battersby 43'	Report	Keane 22'; Simpson 55', 62'	Stadium: Gigg Lane; Attendance: 6,134 (1,326 away); Referee: Kevin Lynch

31 January 1998 29	Wolverhampton Wanderers	0–1	West Bromwich Albion	Wolverhampton
15:00 GMT		Report	Hunt 72'	Stadium: Molineux; Attendance: 28,244 (3,200 away); Referee: Scott Mathieson

7 February 1998 30	Wolverhampton Wanderers	0–1	Sunderland	Wolverhampton
15:00 GMT		Report	Ball 88'	Stadium: Molineux; Attendance: 27,502 (3,178 away); Referee: Rob Harris

18 February 1998 31	Wolverhampton Wanderers	2–1	Bradford City	Wolverhampton
19:45 GMT	Robinson 43'; Bull 89'	Report	Blake 58'	Stadium: Molineux; Attendance: 21,510 (821 away); Referee: Andy D'Urso

21 February 1998 32	Huddersfield Town	1–0	Wolverhampton Wanderers	Huddersfield
15:00 GMT	Dyson 90'	Report		Stadium: McAlpine Stadium; Attendance: 12,663 (2,323 away); Referee: Roy Pearson

28 February 1998 33	Wolverhampton Wanderers	1–3	Birmingham City	Wolverhampton
13:00 GMT	Freedman 13'	Report	Ndlovu 35' (pen.), 77'; Adebola 71'	Stadium: Molineux; Attendance: 25,591 (3,195 away); Referee: George Cain

4 March 1998 34	Wolverhampton Wanderers	1–1	Stoke City	Wolverhampton
19:45 GMT	Freedman 22'	Report	Crowe 89'	Stadium: Molineux; Attendance: 21,058 (918 away); Referee: Eddie Wolstenholme

14 March 1998 35	Wolverhampton Wanderers	1–0	Crewe Alexandra	Wolverhampton
15:00 GMT	Keane 35'	Report	Smith (penalty missed) 67'	Stadium: Molineux; Attendance: 24,272 (1,423 away); Referee: Graham Frankland

18 March 1998 36	Swindon Town	0–0	Wolverhampton Wanderers	Swindon
19:45 GMT		Report		Stadium: County Ground; Attendance: 7,770 (1,380 away); Referee: Anthony Leake

21 March 1998 37	Ipswich Town	3–0	Wolverhampton Wanderers	Ipswich
15:00 GMT	Johnson 3'; Holland 57'; Scowcroft 74'	Report		Stadium: Portman Road; Attendance: 21,510 (1,039 away); Referee: Barry Knight

29 March 1998 38	Wolverhampton Wanderers	2–0	Portsmouth	Wolverhampton
12:05 BST	Goodman 44'; Osborn 90+2'	Report		Stadium: Molineux; Attendance: 20,718 (982 away); Referee: Trevor Jones

1 April 1998 39	Queens Park Rangers	0–0	Wolverhampton Wanderers	London
19:45 BST		Report		Stadium: Loftus Road; Attendance: 12,337 (1,168 away); Referee: John Kirkby

7 April 1998 40	Charlton Athletic	1–0	Wolverhampton Wanderers	London
19:45 BST	Mendonca 8'	Report		Stadium: The Valley; Attendance: 13,743 (1,283 away); Referee: Frazier Stretton

11 April 1998 41	Wolverhampton Wanderers	2–2	Manchester City	Wolverhampton
15:00 BST	Margetson 34' (o.g.); Simpson 85'	Report	Pollock 13'; Horlock 63'	Stadium: Molineux; Attendance: 24,458 (3,194 away); Referee: Mark Halsey

13 April 1998 42	Nottingham Forest	3–0	Wolverhampton Wanderers	Nottingham
12:05 BST	Johnson 32' van Hooijdonk 39'; Campbell 90+1'	Report		Stadium: City Ground; Attendance: 22,863 (1,483 away); Referee: Phil Richards

18 April 1998 43	Wolverhampton Wanderers	3–1	Reading	Wolverhampton
15:00 BST	Muscat 9'; Goodman 69', 90'	Report	Brayson 44'	Stadium: Molineux; Attendance: 19,785 (1,415 away); Referee: Terry Heilbron

25 April 1998 44	Wolverhampton Wanderers	3–4	Stockport County	Wolverhampton
15:00 BST	Keane 5', 59' (penalty missed) 73'; Atkins 45'	Report	Cooper 40' (pen.), 83' (pen.); Byrne 57', 86'	Stadium: Molineux; Attendance: 22,452 (702 away); Referee: Roger Furnandiz

29 April 1998 45	Middlesbrough	1–1	Wolverhampton Wanderers	Middlesbrough
19:45 BST	Ricard 12'	Report	Atkins 10'	Stadium: Riverside Stadium; Attendance: 29,878 (1,569 away); Referee: Mike Bailey

3 May 1998 46	Tranmere Rovers	2–1	Wolverhampton Wanderers	Birkenhead
13:30 BST	Aldridge 34' (pen.), 75'	Report	Goodman 51'	Stadium: Prenton Park; Attendance: 11,144 (976 away); Referee: Kevin Lynch

Final table

Pos	Team	Pld	W	D	L	GF	GA	GD	Pts
6	Sheffield United	46	19	17	10	69	54	+15	74
7	Birmingham City	46	19	17	10	60	35	+25	74
8	Stockport County	46	19	8	19	71	69	+2	65
9	Wolverhampton Wanderers	46	18	11	17	57	53	+4	65
10	West Bromwich Albion	46	16	13	17	50	56	−6	61

Source: Statto.com

Results summary

Overall								Home						Away					
Pld	W	D	L	GF	GA	GD	Pts	W	D	L	GF	GA	GD	W	D	L	GF	GA	GD
46	18	11	17	57	53	+4	65	13	6	4	42	25	+17	5	5	13	15	28	−13

Source: Statto.com

Results by round

Round	1	2	3	4	5	6	7	8	9	10	11	12	13	14	15	16	17	18	19	20	21	22	23	24	25	26	27	28	29	30	31	32	33	34	35	36	37	38	39	40	41	42	43	44	45	46
Result	W	D	L	W	D	L	W	D	D	L	L	W	W	L	W	W	L	D	W	W	L	W	D	W	W	W	L	W	L	L	W	L	L	D	W	D	L	W	D	L	D	L	W	L	D	L
Position	1	5	11	8	7	9	6	9	11	13	15	12	8	11	9	6	8	9	9	9	9	9	8	7	6	6	6	6	6	6	6	6	9	9	8	8	8	8	8	8	8	8	8	8	8	9

Source: Statto.com
W = Win; D = Draw; L = Loss

=== FA Cup ===
14 January 1998 R3	Darlington	0–4	Wolverhampton Wanderers	Darlington
19:45 GMT		Report	Freedman 18'; Paatelainen 66', 90'; Ferguson 90'	Stadium: Feethams; Attendance: 5,018 (833 away); Referee: George Cain

24 January 1998 R4	Charlton Athletic	1–1	Wolverhampton Wanderers	London
15:00 GMT	Jones 64'	Report	Richards 47'	Stadium: The Valley; Attendance: 15,540 (2,346 away); Referee: Graham Poll

3 February 1998 R4 rep.	Wolverhampton Wanderers	3–0	Charlton Athletic	Wolverhampton
19:45 GMT	Curle 29' (pen.); Naylor 48'; Paatelainen 65'	Report		Stadium: Molineux; Attendance: 20,429 (818 away); Referee: Graham Poll

14 February 1998 R5	Wimbledon	1–1	Wolverhampton Wanderers	London
15:00 GMT	Euell 14'	Report	Paatelainen 67'	Stadium: Selhurst Park; Attendance: 15,322 (2,765 away); Referee: Uriah Rennie

25 February 1998 R5 rep.	Wolverhampton Wanderers	2–1	Wimbledon	Wolverhampton
19:45 GMT	Robinson 63'; Freedman 85'	Report	Jones 48'	Stadium: Molineux; Attendance: 25,112 (961 away); Referee: Uriah Rennie

7 March 1998 QF	Leeds United	0–1	Wolverhampton Wanderers	Leeds
15:00 GMT	Hasselbaink (penalty missed) 88'	Report	Goodman 82'	Stadium: Elland Road; Attendance: 39,902 (3,300 away); Referee: Paul Durkin

5 April 1998 SF	Wolverhampton Wanderers	0–1	Arsenal	Birmingham
12:00 BST		Report	Wreh 12'	Stadium: Villa Park; Attendance: 39,372 (20,465 Wolves); Referee: Stephen Lodge

=== League Cup ===
12 August 1997 R1.1	Queens Park Rangers	0–2	Wolverhampton Wanderers	London
19:45 BST		Report	Froggatt 13'; Paatelainen 86'	Stadium: Loftus Road; Attendance: 8,355 (1,272 away); Referee: Andy D'Urso

27 August 1997 R1.2	Wolverhampton Wanderers	1–2 (3–2 agg.)	Queens Park Rangers	Wolverhampton
19:45 BST	Ferguson 62' (pen.)	Report	Peacock 36'; Murray 66'	Stadium: Molineux; Attendance: 18,398 (624 away); Referee: John Kirkby

16 September 1997 R2.1	Fulham	0–1	Wolverhampton Wanderers	London
19:45 BST			Sanjuán 34'	Stadium: Craven Cottage; Attendance: 5,933 (943 away)

24 September 1997 R2.2	Wolverhampton Wanderers	1–0 (2–0 agg.)	Fulham	Wolverhampton
19:45 BST	Goodman 89'	Report		Stadium: Molineux; Attendance: 17,862 (582 away); Referee: Scott Mathieson

14 October 1997 R3	Reading	4–2	Wolverhampton Wanderers	Reading
19:45 BST	Williams 33' (o.g.); Parkinson 34'; Meaker 46'; McPherson 54'	Report	Bull 44', 57'	Stadium: Elm Park; Attendance: 11,080 (1,368 away); Referee: Clive Wilkes

== Players ==
Key:
‡ On loan from another club * First appearance(s) for the club

- # = Squad number
- Pos = Playing position
- P = Number of games played
- G = Number of goals scored
- GK = Goalkeeper
- DF = Defender
- MF = Midfielder
- FW = Forward
- = Yellow cards
- = Red cards
- † Permanent player left club during the season
- ¤ Loaned to another club for part or all of season

Correct as of end of season. Starting appearances are listed first, followed by substitute appearances in parentheses where applicable.

Pos	Name	P	G	P	G	P	G	P	G	A yellow card	A red card	Notes
Pos	Name	League		FA Cup		League Cup		Total		Discipline		Notes
GK	(England) Justin Bray	0	0	0	0	0	0	0	0	0	0	
GK	(England) Matt Murray	0	0	0	0	0	0	0	0	0	0	
GK	(Netherlands) Hans Segers	11	0	2	0	0	0	13	0	0	0	
GK	(England) Mike Stowell	35	0	5	0	5	0	45	0	0	0	
DF	(England) Simon Coleman ‡	3(1)	0	0	0	0	0	3(1)	0	0	0	
DF	(England) Keith Curle (c)	40	1	7	1	0	0	47	2	0	0	
DF	(Wales) Ryan Green	0	0	0	0	0	0	0	0	0	0	
DF	(Poland) Dariusz Kubicki ¤	12	0	0	0	4	0	16	0	2	0	
DF	(Australia) Kevin Muscat	22(2)	3	5	0	0	0	27(2)	3	9	0	
DF	(England) Lee Naylor	14(2)	0	4	1	1	0	19(2)	1	1	0	
DF	(England) Dean Richards	13	0	7	1	0	0	20	1	1	0	
DF	(England) Jamie Smith †	11	0	0	0	5	0	16	0	0	0	
DF	(England) Chris Westwood	3(1)	1	0	0	1(1)	0	4(2)	1	1	0	
DF	(Wales) Ady Williams	20	0	2(2)	0	2	0	24(2)	0	3	0	
DF	(Scotland) Stephen Wright ‡	3	0	0	0	0	0	3	0	0	0	
MF	(England) Mark Atkins	30(4)	2	4(1)	0	5	0	39(5)	2	3	0	
MF	(Australia) Steve Corica	0(1)	0	0	0	0	0	0(1)	0	0	0	
MF	(England) Tony Daley	0(2)	0	0(1)	0	0	0	0(3)	0	0	0	
MF	(Spain) Isidro Díaz †	1	0	0	0	0	0	1	0	0	0	
MF	(England) Neil Emblen †	6(1)	0	0	0	0	0	6(1)	0	1	0	
MF	(Scotland) Darren Ferguson	22(4)	0	2	1	5	1	29(4)	2	8	0	
MF	(England) Steve Froggatt	31(2)	2	3	0	3	1	37(2)	3	4	0	
MF	(Barbados) Michael Gilkes	3	0	0	0	0	0	3	0	1	0	
MF	(England) Simon Osborn	23(1)	2	3	0	0	0	26(1)	2	3	1	
MF	(Wales) Carl Robinson	27(5)	3	7	1	4	0	38(5)	4	7	0	
MF	(England) Steve Sedgley	18(1)	0	6	0	2	0	26(1)	0	4	2	
MF	(Spain) Jesús García Sanjuán ‡	4	0	0	0	2(1)	1	6(1)	1	1	0	
MF	(England) Paul Simpson	23(5)	4	2(2)	0	0	0	25(7)	4	0	1	
MF	(Australia) Robbie Slater	4(2)	0	0(1)	0	0	0	4(3)	0	0	0	
MF	(England) Jermaine Wright †	0(4)	0	0	0	0	0	0(4)	0	0	0	
FW	(England) Steve Bull	24(7)	7	1(2)	0	5	2	30(9)	9	2	1	
FW	(England) Steve Claridge	4(1)	0	1	0	0	0	5(1)	0	0	0	
FW	(Republic of Ireland) Glen Crowe ¤	0(2)	0	0	0	0	0	0(2)	0	0	0	
FW	(Republic of Ireland) Dominic Foley ¤	1(4)	0	0	0	0(2)	0	1(6)	0	0	0	
FW	(Scotland) Dougie Freedman	25(4)	10	5(1)	2	0	0	30(5)	12	8	0	
FW	(England) Don Goodman	29(1)	8	6	1	2(1)	1	37(2)	10	4	0	
FW	(England) Mark Jones	0	0	0	0	0	0	0	0	0	0	
FW	(Republic of Ireland) Robbie Keane	34(4)	11	1(2)	0	3(1)	0	38(7)	11	2	0	
FW	(England) Richard Leadbeater	0	0	0	0	0	0	0	0	0	0	
FW	(Finland) Mixu Paatelainen	10(13)	0	4(1)	4	4(1)	1	18(15)	5	6	0	
FW	(Grenada) Jason Roberts ¤	0	0	0	0	0	0	0	0	0	0	

== Transfers ==
=== In ===
Date	Player	From	Fee
11 July 1997	(England) Steve Sedgley	Ipswich Town	£350,000
6 August 1997	(Poland) Dariusz Kubicki	Sunderland	Free
6 August 1997	(Finland) Mixu Paatelainen	Bolton Wanderers	£250,000
1 September 1997	(Spain) Isidro Díaz	Unattached	Free
5 September 1997	(Netherlands) Hans Segers	Unattached	Free
12 September 1997	(Grenada) Jason Roberts	Hayes	£250,000
21 October 1997	(Scotland) Dougie Freedman	Crystal Palace	£800,000
21 October 1997	(Australia) Kevin Muscat	Crystal Palace	£200,000
11 November 1997	(England) Paul Simpson	Derby County	£75,000
25 March 1998	(England) Neil Emblen	Crystal Palace	Undisclosed
25 March 1998	(Australia) Robbie Slater	Southampton	£50,000
26 March 1998	(England) Steve Claridge	Leicester City	£350,000

=== Out ===
Date	Player	To	Fee
June 1997	(Northern Ireland) Robbie Dennison	Released	Free
June 1997	(Wales) Brian Law	Released	Free
June 1997	(England) Dennis Pearce	Released	Free
June 1997	(France) Serge Romano	Released	Free
June 1997	(England) Geoff Thomas	Released	Free
June 1997	(England) Andy Thompson	Released	Free
June 1997	(Wales) Eric Young	Released	Free
7 July 1997	(Wales) Iwan Roberts	Norwich City	£850,000
11 July 1997	(England) Mark Venus	Ipswich Town	£150,000
13 August 1997	(England) Neil Emblen	Crystal Palace	£1.8 million
30 September 1997	(Spain) Isidro Díaz	Released	Free
21 October 1997	(England) Jamie Smith	Crystal Palace	£1 million
19 February 1998	(England) Jermaine Wright	Crewe Alexandra	£25,000

=== Loans in ===
Start date	Player	From	End date
2 September 1997	(England) Simon Coleman	Bolton Wanderers	2 October 1997
15 September 1997	(Spain) Jesús García Sanjuán	(Spain) Real Zaragoza	15 December 1997
10 October 1997	(England) Paul Simpson	Derby County	10 November 1997
17 October 1997	(Scotland) Dougie Freedman	Crystal Palace	20 October 1997
19 March 1998	(Scotland) Stephen Wright	(Scotland) Rangers	End of season

=== Loans out ===
Start date	Player	To	End date
24 October 1997	(Republic of Ireland) Glen Crowe	Cardiff City	9 December 1997
December 1997	(Grenada) Jason Roberts	Torquay United	5 March 1998
24 February 1998	(Republic of Ireland) Dominic Foley	Watford	End of season
4 March 1998	(Poland) Dariusz Kubicki	Tranmere Rovers	End of season
25 March 1998	(Grenada) Jason Roberts	Bristol City	End of season

== Kit ==
The season retained the home kit of the previous year: a "wolf head" design created using their traditional gold and black colours. A new away kit comprising a white away shirt with a dark green collar and dark green shorts was introduced. Both were manufactured by Puma and sponsored by Goodyear.
