= Colin Taylor (footballer, born 1971) =

English footballer

Personal information
- Full name: Colin David Taylor
- Date of birth: 25 December 1971 (age 54)
- Place of birth: Liverpool, England
- Position: Striker

Youth career
- 19xx–1987: Everton
- 1987–1990: Wolverhampton Wanderers

Senior career*
Years	Team	Apps	(Gls)
1990–1993	Wolverhampton Wanderers	19	(2)
1992	→ Wigan Athletic (loan)	7	(2)
1992	→ Preston North End (loan)	4	(0)
1993	→ Doncaster Rovers (loan)	2	(0)
1993–1995	Telford United		
1995–1996	Runcorn		

International career
	England U18	4	(2)
- * Club domestic league appearances and goals

Colin David Taylor (born 25 December 1971) is an English former footballer who played as a striker in the Football League for Wolverhampton Wanderers.

== Career ==
Taylor joined Wolverhampton Wanderers in 1987 as a YTS apprentice, before signing professional forms in March 1990. He made his senior debut on 25 September 1990 as a substitute in a goalless League Cup tie at Hull. His only league goals for Wolves came on 22 December 1990 when he scored twice against Millwall in a Second Division fixture.

Although the striker had a prolific record at youth and reserve team level, first team opportunities at Molineux were at the time limited due to the goalscoring duo of Steve Bull and Andy Mutch. Taylor instead had several loan spells at lower league teams to gain playing time, representing Wigan Athletic in the 1991–92 season (scoring twice), and both Preston and Doncaster in 1992–93.

After a total of 24 appearances (scoring 3 times) for Wolves he was freed to join non-league Telford United in July 1993. He remained with Telford for two seasons before moving to fellow Conference National side Runcorn. In his later career he played for numerous clubs at non-league level.
