= Paul Jones (footballer, born 1965) =

English footballer

Personal information
- Full name: Paul Anthony Jones
- Date of birth: 9 September 1965 (age 61)
- Place of birth: Walsall, England
- Height: 5 ft 9 in (1.75 m)
- Position: Midfielder

Youth career
- 1981–1983: Walsall

Senior career*
| Years | Team | Apps | (Gls) |
| 1983–1989 | Walsall | 143 | (15) |
| 1989 | → Wrexham (loan) | 5 | (0) |
| 1989–1991 | Wolverhampton Wanderers | 14 | (0) |
| 1991–19xx | Kettering Town | | |
- * Club domestic league appearances and goals

Paul Anthony Jones (born 9 September 1965) is an English former footballer who played as a midfielder in the Football League for Walsall and Wolverhampton Wanderers.

== Career ==
Jones joined Walsall in 1981 as an apprentice, before signing professional forms in September 1983. He played 143 games in the league for the club before leaving in November 1989 to join Second Division side Wolverhampton Wanderers.

The midfielder made fifteen appearances in total for Wolves before being released in 1991, after which he entered non-league football, initially with Kettering Town.
