= Paul Edwards (footballer, born 1963) =

English footballer

Personal information
- Full name: Paul Edwards
- Date of birth: 25 December 1963 (age 62)
- Place of birth: Birkenhead, England
- Position: Left back

Senior career*
Years	Team	Apps	(Gls)
1987–1988	Altrincham	?	(?)
1988–1990	Crewe Alexandra	86	(6)
1990–1992	Coventry City	36	(0)
1992–1994	Wolverhampton Wanderers	46	(0)
1994–1996	West Bromwich Albion	51	(0)
1996	→ Bury (loan)	4	(0)
1996	Hednesford Town	?	(?)
Total		223	(6)
- * Club domestic league appearances and goals

Paul Edwards (born 25 December 1963) is an English former professional footballer who played as a left back. Active in the Football League between 1988 and 1996 for five different clubs, Edwards made over 200 career appearances.

== Career ==
Born in Birkenhead, Edwards began his career in non-League football with Altrincham, before playing in the Football League with Crewe Alexandra, Coventry City, Wolverhampton Wanderers, West Bromwich Albion and Bury. Edwards then returned to non-League football with Hednesford Town.

Following his time at Crewe—where he played 108 games, scoring seven goals—he was named in the 1989-1990 Third Division PFA Team of the Year, the first Crewe player to feature in the awards. In March 1990, he was sold to Coventry City for £350,000.

== Honours ==
Individual

- PFA Team of the Year: 1989–90 Third Division
