= Darren Simkin =

English footballer

Personal information
- Full name: Darren Spencer Simkin
- Date of birth: 24 March 1970 (age 56)
- Place of birth: Walsall, England
- Position: Defender

Senior career*
Years	Team	Apps	(Gls)
19xx–1992	Blakenhall Town		
1992–1994	Wolverhampton Wanderers	15	(0)
1994–1996	Shrewsbury Town	12	(0)
1995	→ Telford United (loan)		
1996–1997	Telford United		
1997–2000	Blakenhall Town		
2000–2002	Stafford Rangers		
2002–2004	Hednesford Town		
- * Club domestic league appearances and goals

Darren Spencer Simkin (born 24 March 1970) is an English former footballer who played as a defender. He played in the Football League for both Wolverhampton Wanderers and Shrewsbury Town. His daughter Lily Simkin is a footballer who plays For Wolves Women.

== Career ==
Simkin joined Second Division club Wolverhampton Wanderers in November 1992 for £10,000 from non-league Blakenhall Town. He made his senior debut on 7 April 1993 in a 1–1 draw against Luton Town, the first of seven consecutive first team appearances.

He made only sixteen appearances in total for Wolves before he was sold to Shrewsbury Town in December 1994 for £36,000. He remained with Shrewsbury for eighteen months before he dropped back into non-league by joining Telford United, whom he had also spent a loan spell with.

The defender spent the remaining years of his football career in West Midlands non-league football, before ending his pro career in 2004 shortly after winning the FA Trophy with Hednesford Town.

Since leaving football Simkin has entered Walsall fire service.

Simkin is married with two children..
