= Shaun Bradbury =

English footballer

Personal information
- Full name: Shaun Bradbury
- Date of birth: 11 February 1974 (age 52)
- Place of birth: Birmingham, England
- Position: Striker

Youth career
- 1990–1992: Wolverhampton Wanderers

Senior career*
Years	Team	Apps	(Gls)
1992–1994	Wolverhampton Wanderers	2	(2)
1994	→ Telford United (loan)	5	(0)
1994–1995	Hereford United	0	(0)
1995–1996	Shifnal Town		
1996–1997	Blakenall Town		
1997–2003	Chasetown	238	(105)
2003–2004	Bridgnorth Town		
- * Club domestic league appearances and goals

Shaun Bradbury (born 11 February 1974) is an English former footballer who played as a striker in the Football League for Wolverhampton Wanderers.

== Career ==
Bradbury joined Wolverhampton Wanderers in 1990 as an apprentice, before signing professional forms in July 1992. He made his senior debut on 8 October 1991 in a League Cup tie at Shrewsbury, but did not feature again until the end of the 1992–93 season, when he scored twice on his league debut in a 3–1 win against Millwall on 1 May 1993. He started the following match, away at Derby, but never played another first team game for Wolves.

In July 1994 he moved to Third Division side Hereford United, but did not make a first team appearance for them before dropping into non-league football, initially with Shifnal Town. His later career included a six-year spell with Chasetown.
