= Jimmy Kelly (footballer, born 1973) =

English footballer

Personal information
- Full name: James Kelly
- Date of birth: 14 February 1973 (age 53)
- Place of birth: Liverpool, England
- Height: 5 ft 7 in (1.70 m)
- Position: Midfielder

Senior career*
Years	Team	Apps	(Gls)
1990–1992	Wrexham	21	(0)
1992–1996	Wolverhampton Wanderers	7	(0)
1993	→ Walsall (loan)	10	(2)
1994	→ Wrexham (loan)	9	(0)
1998–2000	Hednesford Town	30	(0)
2000–2002	Doncaster Rovers	62	(4)
2002–2003	Chester City	32	(1)
2003–2004	Scarborough	30	(2)
2004–2005	Morecambe	29	(1)
- * Club domestic league appearances and goals

James Kelly (born 14 February 1973) is an English former professional footballer who played as a midfielder for several clubs in The Football League until 1996. He then played for a succession of non-league and Welsh Premier League teams.

== Playing career ==
Kelly began his career as an apprentice with Wrexham, making his Football League debut during the 1990–91 season. After 17 league appearances for the Welsh side, Kelly moved to Wolverhampton Wanderers in February 1992 as part of an exchange deal involving John Paskin.

His spell at Molineux included loan spells with Walsall and back at Wrexham, but his career was thrown into jeopardy on 5 September 1994 when he and two other men were charged with the murder of 26-year-old Peter Dunphy, who died from injuries suffered in a brawl outside a hotel in Liverpool. The case came to court more than a year later and on 6 February 1996 Kelly was found guilty of manslaughter and sentenced to five years in prison.

He returned to playing on his release from prison in 1998 when, after a short spell at Bury, he joined Nationwide Conference side Hednesford Town and became a popular player in his two years at Keys Park. In 2000, he moved to Doncaster Rovers for an undisclosed fee, where he remained until being released at the end of the 2001–02 season and joined fellow Conference side Chester City. He helped the club reach the play–offs in his one season at the club before a loan deal at Scarborough was made permanent in October 2003. He became club captain, leading the side to an FA Cup fourth round tie with Chelsea the following January.

Spells with Morecambe and Lancaster City followed before Kelly moved to Droylsden in December 2006 and helped the Bloods win the Conference North title. He then moved to Rhyl, although he missed much of his first season at the club due to a knee injury. He signed for Conference North club Fleetwood Town on 31 December 2008, before playing at Colwyn Bay during the 2009–10 season, where he helped his team win promotion to the Premier Division of the Northern Premier League. Just days before the 2010–11 season started Kelly joined another Northern Premier League side, Ashton United, making his full debut away at Colwyn Bay.

In July 2011 he joined Nantwich Town.

In September 2011 he joined Congleton Town. In June 2012 he joined Welsh club Conwy United as player/ coach.
