= Steve Bull =

English footballer

Steve Bull MBE
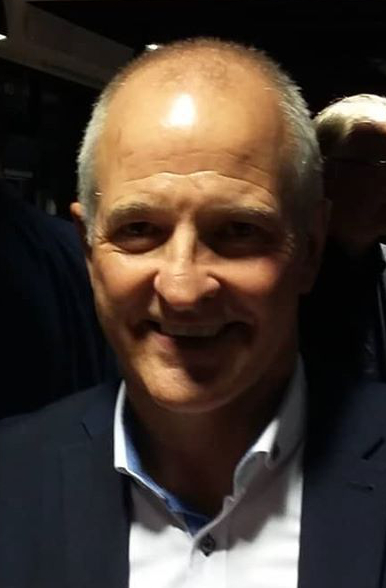
- Bull in 2019

Personal information
- Full name: Stephen George Bull
- Date of birth: 28 March 1965 (age 61)
- Place of birth: Tipton, Staffordshire, England
- Height: 1.75 m (5 ft 9 in)
- Position: Striker

Youth career
- 1981–1984: Tipton Town
- 1984–1985: West Bromwich Albion

Senior career*
Years	Team	Apps	(Gls)
1984–1985	Tipton Town	20	(17)
1985–1986	West Bromwich Albion	4	(2)
1986–1999	Wolverhampton Wanderers	474	(250)
2000–2001	Hereford United	6	(2)
Total		504	(271)

International career
1989	England U21	5	(3)
1989–1991	England B	5	(2)
1989–1990	England	13	(4)

Managerial career
- 2008: Stafford Rangers
- * Club domestic league appearances and goals

Stephen George Bull MBE (born 28 March 1965) is an English former professional footballer who is best remembered for his 13-year spell at Wolverhampton Wanderers. He played there from 1986 until his retirement from playing in 1999, and holds the club's goalscoring record with 306 goals, which included 18 hat-tricks for the club.

He was capped 13 times for the England team between 1989 and 1990, scoring four goals.

== Playing career ==
=== Early years ===
Bull was born in Tipton and started school in September 1969 at Wednesbury Oak Primary School and moved up to Willingsworth High School in September 1976, by which time he was excelling in school football teams. The junior teams he played for included Ocker Hill infants, Red Lion and Newey Goodman. He left school in 1981 to join non-league Tipton Town. During this time he also held down a succession of factory jobs in addition to playing local league games.

He began his professional career, aged 19, after being recommended to West Bromwich Albion in 1984 by his Tipton Town manager Sid Day, who also worked as a scout for the Baggies. After initially having to train with the club's youth ranks, he was quickly offered a pro contract and moved into first team contention. He made his senior debut on 23 October 1985, replacing Garth Crooks in a 2–1 Full Members Cup win against Crystal Palace. He made his league debut as a substitute against QPR, away, on 12 April 1986 (lost 1–0), and his full debut at home to Sheffield Wednesday on 22 April (drew 1-1); they were his only league appearances that season and only appearances in top flight football.

Bull played three Second Division games for Albion after they were relegated in 1986, scoring twice, and also scored one goal in two League Cup appearances for the club. Bull knew it would be difficult to break the Crooks/Varadi partnership, so was prepared to drop to the bottom tier in search of first team football. In November 1986, he was sold to local rivals Wolverhampton Wanderers, along with Andy Thompson, for £65,000 where he remained until the end of his professional career in 1999, becoming one of Wolves' most loyal players.

=== Wolverhampton Wanderers ===
Bull's debut for Wolves, then languishing in the Fourth Division, was against Wrexham on 22 November 1986. His first goal for the club came on 2 December 1986 in the Associate Members' Cup as Wolves beat Cardiff City 1–0 at Ninian Park.

In over 13 years at Wolves, Bull broke four of the club's goalscoring records. He became their all-time leading goalscorer with 306 goals in competitive games (250 of them in the Football League, also a club record) and became their highest goalscorer in a single season when he scored 52 goals in competitive games during the 1987–88 season. Bull also scored a club record of 18 hat-tricks - the first of them against Hartlepool United in a 4-1 Fourth Division home win on 9 May 1987, the last on 17 August 1996 in a 3-1 Division One away win over Grimsby Town.

Bull's first season at the club saw him score a total of 19 goals for Wolves - 15 of them in the Fourth Division, in which they finished fourth - although they lost out on promotion after being beaten by Aldershot in the playoffs.

In the 1987–88 season, Wolves won the Fourth Division championship and became the first of only five teams (later matched by Burnley, Preston North End, Portsmouth and Sheffield United) to have been champions of all four divisions in the English league. Bull's impressive total of 52 goals in all competitions during the season included 34 goals in the league, with league hat-tricks against Exeter City and Darlington. He also scored hat-tricks in cup competitions against Cheltenham Town and Brentford. His 50th goal came just 15 months after signing for Wolves, when he found the net twice in a 4–0 home win against Peterborough United on 9 February 1988.

On 24 January 1989, after just over two years at the club, he took his Wolves goal tally to over 100 with a hat-trick in a Third Division game against Bristol City at Molineux, which Wolves won 3–0.

In the 1988–89 season, Bull inspired Wolves to a second successive promotion, this time as Third Division champions, with 50 goals - marking a tally of 102 goals in two seasons. While still playing in the Third Division, he was selected for the England team and scored on his debut against Scotland at Hampden Park. Thirty-seven of his goals that season came in the league for Wolves. He achieved his first four-goal haul on 26 November 1988 in a 6–0 home win over Preston North End, scoring a hat-trick the following month in a 6–2 home victory over Mansfield Town. He managed a third league hat-trick that season in a 5–2 February home win over Fulham. He also scored freely in the cups, scoring four against Port Vale in the Associate Members' Cup and then against Bristol City in the same competition.

In 1989–90, he finally played Second Division football for Wolves, his first goal at this level coming on 26 August 1989 in a 1–1 home draw with Bradford City. On Boxing Day, he scored his 10th Second Division goal of the season, before impressively grabbing all four goals for Wolves in their 4–1 win at promotion-chasing Newcastle United on New Year's Day 1990. On 20 March, in the Black Country derby at Molineux (the first to be played there for six years), as Wolves beat struggling Albion 2–1 to boost their promotion hopes, Bull scored his 20th league goal of the campaign. A hat-trick against Leicester City followed a month later, and he finished that campaign with 24 league goals and 26 in all competitions, although Wolves missed out on the playoffs and the chance of a third successive promotion.

He started the 1990–91 season in style with both goals at home to promotion favourites Oldham Athletic, who came away from the Molineux with a 3–2 victory. These goals took his tally in all competitions to 150 goals in just under four years with Wolves. A hat-trick in a 4–0 home win over Bristol City took him to 11 Second Division goals by 6 October, and he reached the 20-goal margin (for the fourth season running) on 26 February as they beat Port Vale 3–1 at home. A hat-trick at home to Oxford United in a thrilling 3–3 draw came the following month, and Bull finished the season with 25 goals in the league and 26 in all competitions, although once again Wolves missed out on the playoffs and the chance of promotion.

Late in the 1991-92 season, he scored his 195th competitive goal for Wolves after just over five years at the club, breaking the club's decade-old goalscoring record set by John Richards. Early in the following season he became the first player to score 200 goals for Wolves, less than six years after signing. It came on 18 August 1992 in a 3–0 home win over Leicester City in the new Division One, as the Second Division was renamed that year with the creation of the new FA Premier League as the top division of English football.

At the end of the 1994-95 season, when Wolves finished fourth in Division One but lost in the playoff semi-finals, Bull came close to making a £1.5 million transfer to Premier League club Coventry City, then managed by Ron Atkinson, but ultimately turned it down. Bull revealed in a 2012 interview that Torino, Celtic and Newcastle United also showed an interest in signing him while he was at Wolves. Media reports at different stages of his career also linked him with moves to numerous other top division clubs. During the 1991-92 season, press reports suggested he was a transfer target for Leeds United, who went on to win the league title that season.

He scored his 250th goal for Wolves in a 1–1 league draw with Tranmere Rovers at Prenton Park on 3 May 1995.

Bull played only one game in the English top flight — coming on as a substitute, ironically replacing Andy Thompson (who would follow him to Wolves the following season), for West Bromwich Albion in 1986 — the rest of his career was spent in the lower divisions. He came close to achieving his ambition of reaching the Premier League in 1995 and 1997, but Wolves lost in the play-offs both times.

During his final two seasons at Molineux, his chances of first-team football were reduced by a series of knee injuries. He reached the 300-goal milestone on 18 February 1998, scoring in a 2–0 home win over Bradford City in the league. It was the last of nine goals he would score for Wolves that season, as he missed many games due to injuries.

He scored his last hat-trick in all competitions, two years after his final league hat-trick, on 18 August 1998 in a 5–0 home win over Barnet in the Football League Cup first round first leg.

Bull's final goal for the club came against Bury on 26 September 1998 and his final competitive appearance for the club came on the last day of the 1998–99 season against Bradford City. By January 1999, however, reports were circulating that Bull would soon be retiring as a player due to an ongoing knee problem.

On 13 July 1999, at the age of 34, Bull finally admitted defeat in his battle to fully regain fitness and announced his retirement after 13 years with Wolves.

However, he soon returned to playing as player-coach of Hereford United for a season in the Conference, working with Graham Turner, the manager who had signed him for Wolves.

Known by his fans as 'Bully' for his club loyalty, rapport with supporters and passion for the game and also known as the "Tipton Skin" for his trademark closely cropped haircut, he received an MBE for services to Association Football in December 1999, shortly after retiring as a first class player.

Bull is regarded as a legend at Wolves and one of the main stands at their home ground, Molineux, is named after him. This commemoration was made in June 2003, with the stand having previously been known as the John Ireland Stand.

On 29 July 2006, Bull made one final appearance for Wolves in his 20th anniversary testimonial game against Aston Villa at Molineux, playing the first seven minutes of the match.

== International career ==
Bull was capped 13 times by England, and scored 4 goals, all coming in the buildup to the 1990 FIFA World Cup. He scored his first goal on his debut after replacing an injured John Fashanu against Scotland on 27 May 1989, with a low right-footed shot to the net. Two more goals came in a friendly against Czechoslovakia on 25 April 1990. His final England goal came against Tunisia, which earned him a place in Bobby Robson's World Cup squad.

Despite starting his international career well, he did not score another goal for England after this. He played four times during Italia 90 – three times as a substitute against Republic of Ireland, the Netherlands and Belgium and once as a starter against Egypt. His final match for England was on 17 October 1990 against Poland, but he was not picked again by his future Wolves manager, Graham Taylor.

Bull was still technically a Third Division player when he won his first cap, at the end of the 1988–89 season, as Wolves had not yet played in Division Two after their promotion that season. He remains the last player to be capped by England from outside the top two tiers, and one of only five post-war players so honoured.

In total, he scored nine goals in 23 appearances for his country at full, U-21 and "B" team levels.

== Management career ==
On 21 February 2008, Bull entered management with Conference National side Stafford Rangers. He had previously worked as a coach at this level with Hereford United in the 2000–01 season and had completed his UEFA Pro B coaching licence in the years in between. The team was in the relegation zone at the time of his appointment and he was unable to prevent relegation. He parted company with the club on 12 December 2008.

== Personal life ==
He is the cousin of West Bromwich born former footballer Gary Bull, who played for clubs including Barnet, Nottingham Forest and Birmingham City. In November 2022, Bull launched his own clothing line entitled 'SB9' using the famous gold and black; it comprises t-shirts, hoodies, caps, beanies, polos, gilets, track suit trousers and shorts.

== Career statistics ==
Club	Season	League			FA Cup		League Cup		Other		Total	
Club	Season	Division	Apps	Goals	Apps	Goals	Apps	Goals	Apps	Goals	Apps	Goals
West Bromwich Albion	1985–86	First Division	1	0	0	0	0	0	2	0	3	0
West Bromwich Albion	1986–87	Second Division	3	2	0	0	2	1	1	0	6	3
West Bromwich Albion	Total		4	2	0	0	2	1	3	0	9	3
Wolverhampton Wanderers	1986–87	Fourth Division	30	15	0	0	0	0	7	4	37	19
Wolverhampton Wanderers	1987–88	Fourth Division	44	34	2	3	4	3	8	12	58	52
Wolverhampton Wanderers	1988–89	Third Division	45	37	1	0	2	2	7	11	55	50
Wolverhampton Wanderers	1989–90	Second Division	42	24	1	1	4	2	1	0	48	27
Wolverhampton Wanderers	1990–91	Second Division	43	26	1	0	2	0	2	1	48	27
Wolverhampton Wanderers	1991–92	Second Division	43	20	1	0	2	3	1	0	47	23
Wolverhampton Wanderers	1992–93	First Division	36	16	2	1	2	1	2	1	42	19
Wolverhampton Wanderers	1993–94	First Division	27	14	2	0	0	0	1	1	30	15
Wolverhampton Wanderers	1994–95	First Division	31	16	2	0	3	2	3	1	39	19
Wolverhampton Wanderers	1995–96	First Division	44	15	4	2	5	0	0	0	53	17
Wolverhampton Wanderers	1996–97	First Division	43	23	1	0	2	0	2	0	48	23
Wolverhampton Wanderers	1997–98	First Division	31	7	3	0	5	2	0	0	39	9
Wolverhampton Wanderers	1998–99	First Division	15	3	0	0	2	3	0	0	17	6
Wolverhampton Wanderers	Total		474	250	20	7	33	18	34	31	561	306
Hereford United	2000–01	Conference	6	2	0	0	0	0	1	0	7	2
Career total			484	254	20	7	35	19	38	31	577	311

== Honours ==
Wolverhampton Wanderers

- Football League Third Division: 1988–89
- Football League Fourth Division: 1987–88
- Associate Members' Cup: 1987–88

Individual

- PFA Team of the Year: 1987–88 Fourth Division, 1988–89 Third Division, 1989–90 Second Division, 1990–91 Second Division
- Member of the Order of the British Empire (MBE): December 1999
- Freeman of the City of Wolverhampton: September 2018
