= Brian Roberts (English footballer) =

English footballer

Personal information
- Full name: Brian Leslie Ford Roberts
- Date of birth: 6 November 1955 (age 70)
- Place of birth: Manchester, England
- Height: 5 ft 8 in (1.73 m)
- Position: Defender

Youth career
- 1972–1974: Coventry City

Senior career*
Years	Team	Apps	(Gls)
1974–1984	Coventry City	215	(1)
1975	→ Hereford United (loan)	8	(0)
1984–1990	Birmingham City	187	(0)
1990–1992	Wolverhampton Wanderers	21	(0)
Total		431	(1)
- * Club domestic league appearances and goals

Brian Leslie Ford Roberts (born 6 November 1955), commonly known by his nickname Harry Roberts, is an English former professional footballer who played as a defender. He made more than 400 appearances in the Football League for Coventry City, Hereford United, Birmingham City and Wolverhampton Wanderers.

After ten years as a professional at Coventry City he joined Birmingham City for a fee of £10,000 raised through a supporters' "Buy a Player Fund". He won the club's Player of the Year award for 1989. Nicknamed "Harry" after the 1960s police-killer Harry Roberts, he published an autobiography entitled Harry's Game.

He went on to coach at Coventry City before becoming head of sport at a Bablake School in Leamington Spa.

== Honours ==
Birmingham City

- Football League Second Division runners-up: 1984–85
