= Mark Turner (footballer, born 1972) =

English footballer (born 1972)

Personal information
- Date of birth: 4 October 1972 (age 54)
- Place of birth: Bebington, Cheshire, England
- Positions: Defender; midfielder

Youth career
- 1990–1991: Paget Rangers

Senior career*
Years	Team	Apps	(Gls)
1991–1994	Wolverhampton Wanderers	1	(0)
1994–1995	Northampton Town	4	(0)
1995–1997	Telford United	57	(6)
1997	→ Hereford United (loan)	6	(0)
1997–1998	Telford United	54	(7)
1998–2000	King's Lynn	?	(?)
2000–2005	Tamworth	92	(11)
2005–2007	Alfreton Town	55	(4)
2007	Solihull Borough		
2007–2008	Tamworth	1	(0)
Total		159	(15)
- * Club domestic league appearances and goals

Mark Turner (born 4 October 1972) is an English former footballer who played in the Football League for Wolverhampton Wanderers, Northampton Town and Hereford United. He played as a defender or midfielder. He joined Conference North side Tamworth for the second time in 2007.

He started his career with Paget Rangers in the West Midlands Regional League. He then joined Wolverhampton Wanderers in 1991 where he played under his father, Graham Turner, making a single league appearance in three seasons. A season at Northampton Town followed before he joined Conference side Telford United. In 1996, he played six league matches for Hereford United after his father Graham signed him on transfer deadline day, to bolster his relegation-threatened side. Hereford were ultimately relegated to the Conference and Mark returned to Telford for a second season.

After a two-season spell with King's Lynn he joined Tamworth for the first time, playing under Gary Mills, whom he would also play under at Alfreton Town and on his return to Tamworth for the 2007–08 season.
