= Darren Roberts (footballer) =

English footballer

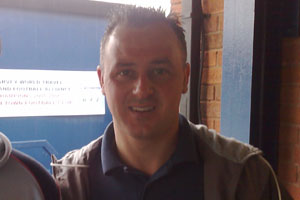

Personal information
- Full name: Darren Anthony Roberts
- Date of birth: 12 October 1969 (age 57)
- Place of birth: Birmingham, England
- Height: 6 ft 0 in (1.83 m)
- Position: Striker

Senior career*
| Years | Team | Apps | (Gls) |
| 1991–1992 | Burton Albion | | |
| 1992–1994 | Wolverhampton Wanderers | 21 | (5) |
| 1994 | → Hereford United (loan) | 6 | (5) |
| 1994 | Doncaster Rovers | 0 | (0) |
| 1994–1996 | Chesterfield | 25 | (1) |
| 1996–1999 | Darlington | 79 | (21) |
| 1998 | → Peterborough United (loan) | 3 | (0) |
| 1999–2000 | Scarborough | 51 | (10) |
| 2000–2001 | Exeter City | 8 | (1) |
| 2000 | → Barrow (loan) | | |
| 2001 | Barrow | | |
| 2001–2002 | Tamworth | 39 | (16) |
| 2002–2004 | Worksop Town | 33 | (13) |
| 2004 | → Belper Town (loan) | | |
| 2004 | → Kidsgrove Athletic (loan) | | |
| 2004 | → Farsley Celtic (loan) | | |
| 2004–2006 | Glapwell | | |
| 2006–???? | Sutton Coldfield Town | | |
- Skye United
| 2013–???? | Seaford United | | |
- * Club domestic league appearances and goals

Darren Anthony Roberts (born 12 October 1969) is an English former football striker.

He scored a first-half hat-trick in his Football League debut for Wolverhampton Wanderers in the 4–0 victory over Birmingham City in a live televised match in 1992.

Roberts finished his playing career in September 2013, playing his part in helping Seaford United secure the Victorian State League Division 4 South championship, the club's first senior men's title in 27 years.
