= Tom Bennett (footballer) =

Scottish footballer (born 1969)

Personal information
- Full name: Thomas McNeill Bennett
- Date of birth: 12 December 1969 (age 56)
- Place of birth: Bo'ness, Falkirk, Scotland
- Position: Midfielder

Youth career
- Gaerdoch United
- 1984–1987: Aston Villa

Senior career*
Years	Team	Apps	(Gls)
1987–1988	Aston Villa	0	(0)
1988–1995	Wolverhampton Wanderers	115	(2)
1995–2000	Stockport County	110	(5)
1999–2000	→ Walsall (loan)	4	(1)
2000	→ Walsall (loan)	7	(2)
2000–2002	Walsall	78	(5)
2002–2004	Boston United	79	(1)
2004–2005	Kidderminster Harriers	24	(0)
2005	Hamilton Academical	1	(0)
- * Club domestic league appearances and goals

Thomas McNeill Bennett (born 12 December 1969) is a Scottish former footballer.

== Honours ==
Walsall

- Football League Second Division play-offs: 2001
