= Andy Mutch =

English footballer (born 1963)

Personal information
- Full name: Andrew Todd Mutch
- Date of birth: 28 December 1963 (age 62)
- Place of birth: Liverpool, England
- Height: 5 ft 10 in (1.78 m)
- Position: Striker

Youth career
- Liverpool
- Everton

Senior career*
Years	Team	Apps	(Gls)
1984–1986	Southport	75	(29)
1986–1993	Wolverhampton Wanderers	289	(96)
1993–1996	Swindon Town	50	(6)
1995	→ Wigan Athletic (loan)	7	(1)
1996–1998	Stockport County	64	(10)
1998–1999	Barrow	22	(8)
1999	Southport	1	(0)
1999–2000	Telford United	5	(0)
Total		513	(150)

International career
1989	England B	3	(0)
1989	England U21	1	(0)

Managerial career
- 2007–2008: Vauxhall Motors
- 2008–2009: Burscough
- 2012: Northwich Victoria
- 2013–2014: Stafford Rangers
- * Club domestic league appearances and goals

Andrew Todd Mutch (born 28 December 1963) is an English former professional footballer who played as a striker. During his playing career, he was widely known for his partnership with Steve Bull at Wolverhampton Wanderers.

== Playing career ==
Mutch was a trainee at Liverpool and Everton but was not taken on as a professional footballer. He was playing for non-league Southport when then-Third Division Wolverhampton Wanderers signed him in February 1986. He made his Wolves debut on 8 March 1986 in a goalless draw with Rotherham United, but despite scoring 7 goals in 15 games could not halt relegation to the bottom tier.

The following season saw the start of his prolific goalscoring partnership with Steve Bull, who arrived in the November. The partnership propelled the team to the play-offs, where they narrowly missed out. In the 1987-88 season, Mutch and Bull scored 53 league goals between them and helped Wolves win Fourth Division Championship. The following season the duo scored a further 58 (83 in all competitions), to fire Wolves to the Third Division Championship and a second successive promotion. He would remain at Wolves for five more seasons, but despite his efforts and those of his colleagues he was unable to take them into the top flight.

Mutch also scored in Wolves' 2–0 victory over Burnley in the Associate Members' Cup at Wembley in May 1988.

Mutch's goal-scoring prowess was recognised by a call-up to the England B squad in 1989 – making three appearances against Switzerland, Norway and Iceland. He also represented his country at under-21 level.

In August 1993, Mutch left Molineux for Premier League new boys Swindon Town in a £250,000 deal. His total record at Wolves was 106 goals in 288 appearances (13 as substitute). His first game for the Wiltshire side came against Liverpool in a 5–0 league defeat, but in his fifth game he made it onto the scoresheet for the first time with an equaliser in a 2–2 draw against also promoted Newcastle United. He also scored a consolation goal later in September in a 4–2 defeat to Manchester United at Old Trafford, and would score a total of six league goals that season (eight in all competitions), but it wasn't enough to stop Swindon from going down with a mere five wins from 42 games and 100 goals conceded.

After two seasons at Swindon – including his one and only season in the top flight – Mutch was loaned to Wigan Athletic but the move was not made permanent, and he instead moved to Stockport County in early 1996. He spent two seasons at Edgeley Park, which saw the club win promotion to the second tier and reach the semi-finals of the League Cup under Dave Jones.

He left Stockport at the end of the 1997-98 season, signing for non-league Barrow, and later returning to play a game for his former club Southport. He ended his playing career while working as a coach at Telford United in 2000.

In the 1994/95 Premier League season his Merlin sticker was the most common amongst collectors. In 2013 Mutch was inducted into the Wolverhampton Wanderers Hall of Fame.

== Managerial career ==
As his playing career had ended, Mutch transitioned into coaching, with spells as assistant manager of both Telford United (while still playing) and Morecambe (2001–2004). He joined Vauxhall Motors in July 2007 as assistant manager, but soon stepped up to become manager in October 2007 after the resignation of Carl Macauley. He left the club after their 6–0 defeat at home to Kettering Town in March 2008, as Macauley returned to the club. In October 2008, he was appointed manager of Burscough of the Conference North. By early 2009 he had left the club.

On 8 May 2012, Mutch was announced as manager of Northwich Victoria. He left the club having resigned, along with player-coach Adriano Rigoglioso on 3 November, with the club eighth in the table, and 21 points behind leaders Coalville Town On 1 October 2013 Mutch was appointed as manager of Evo Stik Premier Club Stafford Rangers after a successful interim period, but left by mutual consent on 2 January after a run of very poor results.

== Honours ==
Wolverhampton Wanderers

- Football League Third Division: 1988–89
- Football League Fourth Division: 1987–88
- Associate Members' Cup: 1987–88

Individual

- PFA Team of the Year: 1987–88 Fourth Division, 1988–89 Third Division
