= 1995–96 Birmingham City F.C. season =

Birmingham City F.C.
1995–96 season
- Chairman: Jack Wiseman
- Manager: Barry Fry (until May 1996); Trevor Francis
- Stadium: St Andrew's
- Football League First Division: 15th
- FA Cup: Third round (eliminated by Wolverhampton Wanderers)
- League Cup: Semi-final (eliminated by Leeds United)
- Anglo-Italian Cup: Quarter-final (eliminated by West Bromwich Albion)
- Top goalscorer: League: Jonathan Hunt (11); All: Jonathan Hunt (15)
- Highest home attendance: 24,781 vs Leeds United, League Cup semi-final 1st leg, 11 February 1996
- Lowest home attendance: 7,446 vs Grimsby Town, League Cup 2nd round 1st leg, 20 September 1995
- Average home league attendance: 18,098
Home colours

The 1995–96 Football League season was Birmingham City Football Club's 93rd in the English football league system. They finished in 15th place in the 24-team Football League First Division, to which they were promoted as Division Two champions in 1994–95. They entered the 1995–96 FA Cup at the third round, losing in that round to Wolverhampton Wanderers after a replay, and entered the League Cup in the first round and progressed to the semi-final, in which they lost on aggregate score to Leeds United. They also took part in the last season of the Anglo-Italian Cup, losing in the quarter-final after a penalty shootout.

At the end of the season, club owner David Sullivan dismissed Barry Fry as manager and replaced him with playing legend Trevor Francis.

The season covers the period from 1 July 1995 to 30 June 1996.

== Football League First Division ==
Date	League position	Opponents	Venue	Result	Score F–A	Scorers	Attendance
12 August 1995	4th	Ipswich Town	H	W	3–1	Tait, Otto, Bowen	18,910
19 August 1995	9th	Charlton Athletic	A	L	1–3	Bowen	9,710
26 August 1995	4th	Norwich City	H	W	3–1	Hunt 3 (1 pen.)	19,267
30 August 1995	9th	Huddersfield Town	A	L	2–4	Ward 2	12,305
2 September 1995	6th	Barnsley	A	W	5–0	Hunt pen., Claridge, Forsyth, Doherty, Charlery	11,121
9 September 1995	5th	Crystal Palace	H	D	0–0		19,403
12 September 1995	6th	Stoke City	H	D	1–1	Hunt	19,005
17 September 1995	11th	West Bromwich Albion	A	L	0–1		17,854
23 September 1995	13th	Watford	A	D	1–1	Finnan	9,422
30 September 1995	12th	Oldham Athletic	H	D	0–0		17,289
8 October 1995	6th	Southend United	H	W	2–0	Claridge 2	17,491
14 October 1995	5th	Portsmouth	A	W	1–0	Claridge	10,009
21 October 1995	3rd	Grimsby Town	H	W	3–1	Claridge 2, Charlery	16,445
29 October 1995	2nd	Port Vale	A	W	2–1	Claridge, Tait	8,875
4 November 1995	2nd	Millwall	H	D	2–2	Castle, Charlery	23,016
11 November 1995	3rd	Reading	A	W	1–0	Charlery	10,203
18 November 1995	3rd	Luton Town	A	D	0–0		7,920
21 November 1995	3rd	Derby County	H	L	1–4	Ward pen.	19,417
26 November 1995	5th	Leicester City	H	D	2–2	Hunt 2 (1 pen.)	17,350
2 December 1995	5th	Southend United	A	L	1–3	Claridge	7,770
9 December 1995	4th	Watford	H	W	1–0	Francis	16,790
16 December 1995	8th	Oldham Athletic	A	L	0–4		6,602
23 December 1995	4th	Tranmere Rovers	H	W	1–0	Hunt	18,439
26 December 1995	3rd	Sheffield United	A	D	1–1	Francis	17,668
14 January 1996	7th	Charlton Athletic	H	L	3–4	Edwards, Hunt pen., Forsyth	18,539
20 January 1996	9th	Ipswich Town	A	L	0–2		12,388
4 February 1996	11th	Norwich City	A	D	1–1	Otto	12,612
17 February 1996	13th	Stoke City	A	L	0–1		15,709
20 February 1996	13th	Barnsley	H	D	0–0		14,168
27 February 1996	13th	Crystal Palace	A	L	2–3	Bowen 2	13,415
2 March 1996	15th	Sheffield United	H	L	0–1		16,799
5 March 1996	13th	Wolverhampton Wanderers	H	W	2–0	Devlin 2 (1 pen.)	22,051
9 March 1996	12th	Tranmere Rovers	A	D	2–2	Hunt, Legg	8,696
12 March 1996	11th	Huddersfield Town	H	W	2–0	Devlin, P. Barnes	15,296
17 March 1996	11th	Sunderland	H	L	0–2		23,251
20 March 1996	11th	West Bromwich Albion	H	D	1–1	Hunt	19,147
23 March 1996	12th	Wolverhampton Wanderers	A	L	2–3	Devlin 2 (1 pen.)	26,256
30 March 1996	13th	Grimsby Town	A	L	1–2	P. Barnes	5,773
2 April 1996	13th	Portsmouth	H	W	2–0	Devlin pen., P. Barnes	14,886
6 April 1996	9th	Port Vale	H	W	3–1	Tait, P. Barnes, Peschisolido	17,469
10 April 1996	10th	Millwall	A	L	0–2		9,271
13 April 1996	9th	Luton Town	H	W	4–0	Francis, Devlin, P. Barnes 2	15,426
16 April 1996	9th	Sunderland	A	L	0–3		19,831
20 April 1996	9th	Derby County	A	D	1–1	Breen	16,757
27 April 1996	12th	Leicester City	A	L	0–3		19,702
5 May 1996	15th	Reading	H	L	1–2	P. Barnes	16,223

=== League table (part) ===
Final First Division table (part)
Pos	Team	Pld	W	D	L	GF	GA	GD	Pts
13th	Tranmere Rovers	46	14	17	15	64	60	+4	59
14th	Southend United	46	15	14	17	52	61	-9	59
15th	Birmingham City	46	15	13	18	61	64	-3	58
16th	Norwich City	46	14	15	17	59	55	+4	57
17th	Grimsby Town	46	14	14	18	55	69	-14	56

Note that goals scored took precedence over goal difference as a tiebreaker in the Football League.

=== Results summary ===
Overall								Home						Away					
Pld	W	D	L	GF	GA	GD	Pts	W	D	L	GF	GA	GD	W	D	L	GF	GA	GD
46	15	13	18	61	64	−3	58	11	7	5	37	23	+14	4	6	13	24	41	−17

== FA Cup ==
Round	Date	Opponents	Venue	Result	Score F–A	Scorers	Attendance
Third round	6 January 1996	Wolverhampton Wanderers	H	D	1–1	Poole	21,349
Third round replay	17 January 1996	Wolverhampton Wanderers	A	L	1–2	Hunt	28,088

== League Cup ==
Round	Date	Opponents	Venue	Result	Score F–A	Scorers	Attendance
First round 1st leg	15 August 1995	Plymouth Argyle	H	W	1–0	Cooper	7,964
First round 2nd leg	22 August 1995	Plymouth Argyle	A	W	2–1; 3–1 agg.	Edwards, Hunt	6,529
Second round 1st leg	20 September 1995	Grimsby Town	H	W	3–1	Daish, Hunt, Claridge	7,446
Second round 2nd leg	3 October 1995	Grimsby Town	A	D	1–1; 4–2 agg.	Bowen	3,280
Third round	24 October 1995	Tranmere Rovers	H	D	1–1	McGreal o.g.	13,752
Third round replay	8 November 1995	Tranmere Rovers	A	W	3–1 a.e.t.	Charlery 2, Rushfeldt	9,151
Fourth round	29 November 1995	Middlesbrough	A	D	0–0		28,031
Fourth round replay	20 December 1995	Middlesbrough	H	W	2–0	Francis 2	19,878
Fifth round	10 January 1996	Norwich City	A	D	1–1	Francis	13,028
Fifth round replay	24 January 1996	Norwich City	H	W	2–1	Daish, Bowen	21,097
Semi-final 1st leg	11 February 1996	Leeds United	H	L	1–2	Francis	24,781
Semi-final 2nd leg	25 February 1996	Leeds United	A	L	0–3; 1–5 agg.		35,435

== Anglo-Italian Cup ==
Round	Date	Opponents	Venue	Result	Score F–A	Scorers	Attendance
Group stage	5 September 1995	Genoa	H	L	2–3	Bowen 2	20,430
Group stage	11 October 1995	Perugia	A	W	1–0	Castle	1,200
Group stage	15 November 1995	Ancona	A	W	2–1	Edwards, Tentoni o.g.	1,500
Group stage	12 December 1995	Cesena	H	W	3–1	Hunt, Claridge, Donowa*	7,813
Quarter-final	30 January 1996	West Bromwich Albion	H	D	2–2; 1–4 pens.	Poole, Bull	9,113

- some sources give Tamburini o.g.

== Transfers ==
=== In ===
Date	Player	Club	Fee	Ref
July 1995	Ken Charlery	Peterborough United	£400,000	
July 1995	Richard Forsyth	Kidderminster Harriers	£50,000	
July 1995	Andy Edwards	Southend United	£450,000	
July 1995	Jae Martin	Southend United	Free	
July 1995	Jason Bowen	Swansea City	£275,000	
July 1995	Steve Castle	Plymouth Argyle	£225,000	
August 1995	Ian Richardson	Dagenham & Redbridge	£60,000	
September 1995	Michael Johnson	Notts County	£225,000	
September 1995	Steve Barnes	Welling United	£30,000	
October 1995	Bart Griemink	WK Emmen	Free	
December 1995	Gary Bull	Nottingham Forest	Free	
January 1996	Fred Barber	Luton Town	Free	
February 1996	Gary Breen	Peterborough United	£250,000	
February 1996	Paul Devlin	Notts County	£250,000	
February 1996	Andy Legg	Notts County	£250,000	
March 1996	Paul Barnes	York City	£350,000	
March 1996	Martin Grainger	Brentford	£400,000	
May 1996	Steve Bruce	Manchester United	Free	
June 1996	Barry Horne	Everton	£250,000	
June 1996	Gary Ablett	Everton	£390,000	

=== Out ===
Date	Player	Fee	Joined†	Ref
July 1995	Andy Saville	£100,000	Preston North End	
September 1995	Ryan Price	£20,000	Macclesfield Town	
January 1996	Ben Sedgemore	Free	Peterborough United	
December 1995	Kenny Lowe	Free	(Gateshead)	
February 1996	Ken Charlery	*	Peterborough United	
February 1996	Liam Daish	£1.5m	Coventry City	
March 1996	Steve Claridge	£1.2m	Leicester City	
March 1996	Gary Bull	§	York City	
March 1996	Chris Whyte	Free	One month	
March 1996	Ian Richardson	£150,000	Notts County	
March 1996	Mark Ward	Free	Huddersfield Town	
March 1996	Scott Hiley	£200,000	Manchester City	
June 1996	Peter Shearer	Released	(Peterborough United)	
June 1996	Gary Cooper	Released		
June 1996	Neil Doherty	Released	(Kidderminster Harriers)	

† Brackets round a club denote the player joined that club after his Birmingham City contract expired.
* Part of the deal in which Gary Breen joined Birmingham from Peterborough United for £250,000.
§ Part of the deal in which Paul Barnes joined Birmingham from York City for £350,000.

=== Loan in ===
Date	Player	Club	Return	Ref
October 1995	Sigurd Rushfeldt	Tromsø IL	Three months	
November 1995	Dan Sahlin	Hammarby IF	One month	
November 1995	Danny Hill	Tottenham Hotspur	One month	
November 1995	David Preece	Derby County	One month	
January 1996	Paul Sansome	Southend United	One month	
February 1996	Vinny Samways	Everton	End of season	
February 1996	John Sheridan	Sheffield Wednesday	One month	

=== Loan out ===
Date	Player	Club	Return	Ref
September 1995	Ian Muir	Darlington	One month	
December 1995	Chris Whyte	Coventry City	One month	
January 1996	Ian Richardson	Notts County	Two months	
January 1996	Ken Charlery	Southend United	One month	
February 1996	Scott Hiley	Manchester City	One month	
February 1996	Neil Doherty	Northampton Town	End of season	
February 1996	Steve Castle	Gillingham	End of season	
March 1996	Steve Finnan	Notts County	End of season	

== Appearances and goals ==
Numbers in parentheses denote appearances made as a substitute.
Players with name in italics and marked * were on loan from another club for the whole of their season with Birmingham.
Players marked † left the club during the playing season.
Key to positions: GK – Goalkeeper; DF – Defender; MF – Midfielder; FW – Forward

Players' appearances and goals by competition
Pos.	Nat.	Name	League		FA Cup		League Cup		Anglo-Italian Cup		Total	
Pos.	Nat.	Name	Apps	Goals	Apps	Goals	Apps	Goals	Apps	Goals	Apps	Goals
GK	ENG	Fred Barber	1	0	0	0	0	0	0	0	1	0
GK	ENG	Ian Bennett	24	0	1	0	8	0	4	0	37	0
GK	NED	Bart Griemink	20	0	1	0	3	0	1 (1)	0	25 (1)	0
GK	ENG	Paul Sansome * †	1	0	0	0	1	0	0	0	2	0
DF	ENG	Jon Bass	5	0	0	0	1	0	0	0	6	0
DF	IRE	Gary Breen	17 (1)	1	0	0	0	0	0	0	17 (1)	1
DF	ENG	Gary Cooper	16 (2)	0	0	0	6 (1)	1	2 (1)	0	24 (4)	1
DF	IRE	Liam Daish †	16 (1)	0	2	0	7	2	1	0	26 (1)	2
DF	ENG	Andy Edwards	36 (1)	1	2	0	11	1	5	1	54 (1)	3
DF	ENG	John Frain	22 (1)	0	2	0	6	0	1	0	29 (1)	0
DF	ENG	Martin Grainger	8	0	0	0	0	0	0	0	8	0
DF	ENG	Scott Hiley †	5	0	0	0	1	0	1	0	7	0
DF	JAM	Michael Johnson	31 (2)	0	1	0	5	0	4	0	41 (2)	0
DF	ENG	Gary Poole	27 (1)	0	2	1	10	0	3	1	42 (1)	2
DF	ENG	Simon Rea	0 (1)	0	0	0	0	0	1 (1)	0	1 (2)	0
DF	ENG	Chris Whyte †	4	0	0	0	4	0	1	0	9	0
MF	ENG	Steve Barnes	0 (3)	0	0	0	0 (1)	0	0 (1)	0	0 (5)	0
MF	WAL	Jason Bowen	16 (7)	4	0 (2)	0	3 (5)	2	2	2	21 (14)	8
MF	ENG	Steve Castle	12 (3)	1	1	0	7	0	3	1	23 (3)	2
MF	WAL	John Cornforth	8	0	0	0	0	0	0	0	8	0
MF	ENG	Louie Donowa	5 (8)	0	1	0	3 (5)	0	1	1	10 (14)	0
MF	IRE	Steve Finnan	6 (6)	1	0	0	2 (2)	0	2 (1)	0	10 (9)	1
MF	ENG	Richard Forsyth	12 (14)	2	2	0	7	2	3 (1)	0	24 (15)	4
MF	ENG	Danny Hill * †	5	0	0	0	2	0	0	0	7	0
MF	ENG	Jonathan Hunt	43 (2)	11	1 (1)	1	8 (3)	2	5	1	52 (6)	15
MF	WAL	Andy Legg	9 (3)	1	0	0	0	0	0	0	9 (3)	1
MF	ENG	Kenny Lowe	0 (2)	0	0	0	0	0	0	0	0 (2)	0
MF	ENG	Ricky Otto	6 (12)	2	0	0	3 (3)	0	3	0	12 (15)	2
MF	ENG	David Preece * †	6	0	0	0	0	0	1	0	7	0
MF	ENG	Ian Richardson †	3 (4)	0	2	0	3 (1)	0	1 (2)	0	9 (7)	0
MF	SWE	Dan Sahlin * †	0 (1)	0	0	0	0	0	0	0	0 (1)	0
MF	ENG	Vinny Samways *	12	0	0	0	0	0	0	0	12	0
MF	IRE	John Sheridan * †	1 (1)	0	0	0	2	0	0	0	3 (1)	0
MF	ENG	Paul Tait	23 (4)	3	0	0	4 (1)	0	2 (1)	0	29 (6)	3
MF	ENG	Mark Ward	13	3	0	0	3 (1)	0	1	0	17 (1)	3
FW	ENG	Paul Barnes	15	7	0	0	0	0	0	0	15	7
FW	ENG	Gary Bull †	3 (3)	0	0 (2)	0	0 (1)	0	0 (1)	0	3 (7)	0
FW	LCA	Ken Charlery †	8 (9)	4	0	0	3 (1)	2	2 (1)	0	13 (11)	6
FW	ENG	Steve Claridge †	28	8	2	0	11 (1)	1	2 (1)	1	43 (2)	10
FW	SCO	Paul Devlin	16	7	0	0	0	0	0	0	16	7
FW	ENG	Neil Doherty	0 (2)	1	0	0	1 (1)	0	0 (1)	0	1 (4)	1
FW	SKN	Kevin Francis	11 (8)	3	2	0	6	4	1	0	20 (8)	7
FW	ENG	Jae Martin	1 (6)	0	0	0	0	0	0 (2)	0	1 (8)	0
FW	ENG	Ian Muir	1	0	0	0	0 (1)	0	0	0	1 (1)	0
FW	CAN	Paul Peschisolido	7 (2)	1	0	0	0	0	0	0	7 (2)	1
FW	NOR	Sigurd Rushfeldt * †	3 (4)	0	0	0	1	1	1	0	5 (4)	1

Players not included in matchday squads
Pos.	Nat.	Name
GK	ENG	Ryan Price †
MF	ENG	Peter Shearer

== See also ==
- Birmingham City F.C. seasons

== Sources ==
- Matthews, Tony (1995). Birmingham City: A Complete Record. Derby: Breedon Books. ISBN 978-1-85983-010-9.
- Matthews, Tony (2010). Birmingham City: The Complete Record. Derby: DB Publishing. ISBN 978-1-85983-853-2.
- For match dates, league positions and results: "Birmingham City 1995–1996: Results". Statto Organisation. Archived from the original on 4 March 2016.
- For lineups, appearances, goalscorers and attendances: Matthews (2010), Complete Record, pp. 426–27, 477–78.
- For transfers: "Birmingham Transfers 1995/96". Soccerbase. Centurycomm.
