= 1993–94 Birmingham City F.C. season =

Birmingham City F.C.
1993–94 season
- Chairman: Jack Wiseman
- Manager: Terry Cooper until December 1993; Barry Fry
- Ground: St Andrew's
- Football League First Division: 22nd (relegated)
- FA Cup: Third round (eliminated by Kidderminster Harriers)
- League Cup: Second round (eliminated by Aston Villa)
- Anglo-Italian Cup: Preliminary round
- Top goalscorer: League: Andy Saville (10); All: Andy Saville (10)
- Highest home attendance: 28,288 vs West Bromwich Albion, 28 December 1993
- Lowest home attendance: 2,710 vs Wolverhampton Wanderers, Anglo-Italian Cup prelim round, 14 September 1993
- Average home league attendance: 14,378
Home colours

The 1993–94 Football League season was Birmingham City Football Club's 91st in the Football League. They finished in 22nd position in the 24-team Division One, so were relegated to the third tier for 1994–95. They entered the 1993–94 FA Cup at the third-round stage, and lost their opening match to non-League club Kidderminster Harriers, and entered the League Cup in the first round, losing in the second to fellow Birmingham-based club Aston Villa. They were eliminated in the preliminary group of the Anglo-Italian Cup.

After a poor start to the season, manager Terry Cooper resigned, believing that new owner David Sullivan wanted to bring in his own man. He was replaced by Southend United manager Barry Fry, at the cost of a record Football League fine of £130,000 after being found guilty of poaching Fry and his staff. At the end of the season, the Kop and Tilton Road terraces of the St Andrew's ground were demolished, to be re-opened the following season as all-seater stands.

The club's top scorer in league matches was Andy Saville with ten goals. Paul Peschisolido was joint top scorer for the club with 10 goals in all competitions alongside Saville.

== Football League First Division ==
=== Match details ===
Date	League position	Opponents	Venue	Result	Score F–A	Scorers	Attendance
14 August 1993	23rd	Charlton Athletic	A	L	0–1		7,788
22 August 1993	21st	Wolverhampton Wanderers	H	D	2–2	Peschisolido, Saville	15,117
28 August 1993	13th	Barnsley	A	W	3–2	Smith 2, Shutt	7,241
31 August 1993	11th	Crystal Palace	H	L	2–4	Peschisolido 2	13,856
4 September 1993	7th	Derby County	H	W	3–0	Saville 2, Frain	15,992
12 September 1993	8th	Leicester City	A	D	1–1	Peschisolido	10,366
18 September 1993	11th	Grimsby Town	H	D	1–1	Donowa	12,108
25 September 1993	12th	Luton Town	H	D	1–1	Shutt	11,801
2 October 1993	11th	Middlesbrough	A	D	2–2	Peschisolido 2	13,801
9 October 1993	15th	Sunderland	A	L	0–1		19,265
16 October 1993	12th	Watford	H	W	1–0	Wallace	12,823
19 October 1993	8th	Bolton Wanderers	H	W	2–1	Shutt, Phillips og	12,071
23 October 1993	10th	Peterborough United	A	L	0–1		7,575
31 October 1993	8th	Millwall	H	W	1–0	Shutt	9,377
2 November 1993	10th	Bristol City	A	L	0–3		9,192
6 November 1993	12th	Nottingham Forest	H	L	0–3		16,996
20 November 1993	16th	Portsmouth	H	L	0–1		11,896
27 November 1993	18th	Tranmere Rovers	H	L	0–3		9,915
4 December 1993	18th	Nottingham Forest	A	L	0–1		22,061
11 December 1993	20th	Crystal Palace	A	L	1–2	Saville	11,935
18 December 1993	17th	Charlton Athletic	H	W	1–0	Lowe	13,714
26 December 1993	17th	Stoke City	A	L	1–2	Peschisolido	16,563
28 December 1993	17th	West Bromwich Albion	H	W	2–0	Saville pen, Peschisolido	28,228
1 January 1994	19th	Southend United	A	L	1–3	Peschisolido	10,731
3 January 1994	17th	Oxford United	H	D	1–1	Donowa	15,142
11 January 1994	17th	Notts County	A	L	1–2	Cooper	7,212
15 January 1994	20th	Watford	A	L	2–5	Willis, McGavin	7,636
22 January 1994	20th	Sunderland	H	D	0–0		15,884
5 February 1994	21st	Peterborough United	H	D	0–0		15,140
12 February 1994	22nd	Millwall	A	L	1–2	Saville	9,538
19 February 1994	22nd	Notts County	H	L	2–3	Frain pen., Saville	12,913
22 February 1994	22nd	Wolverhampton Wanderers	A	L	0–3		24,931
25 February 1994	22nd	Derby County	A	D	1–1	Claridge	16,624
5 March 1994	23rd	Barnsley	H	L	0–2		15,382
12 March 1994	23rd	Grimsby Town	A	L	0–1		5,405
15 March 1994	24th	Leicester City	H	L	0–3		14,681
19 March 1994	24th	Luton Town	A	D	1–1	Claridge	7,690
26 March 1994	24th	Middlesbrough	H	W	1–0	Saville	12,409
29 March 1994	24th	Oxford United	A	L	0–2		8,393
2 April 1994	23rd	Stoke City	H	W	3–1	Claridge, Ward, Willis	13,568
9 April 1994	23rd	Southend United	H	W	3–1	Doherty, Saville, Willis	14,307
16 April 1994	23rd	Bristol City	H	D	2–2	Claridge pen, Donowa	20,316
23 April 1994	22nd	Portsmouth	A	W	2–0	Willis, Claridge pen.	11,101
27 April 1994	21st	West Bromwich Albion	A	W	4–2	Claridge 2, Donowa, Saville	20,316
30 April 1994	22nd	Bolton Wanderers	A	D	1–1	Willis	13,602
8 May 1994	22nd	Tranmere Rovers	A	W	2–1	Donowa, Garnett o.g.	15,210

=== League table (part) ===
Final Division One table (part)
Pos	Team	Pld	W	D	L	GF	GA	GD	Pts
20th	Luton Town	46	14	11	21	56	60	−4	53
21st	West Bromwich Albion	46	13	12	21	60	69	−9	51
22nd	Birmingham City	46	13	12	21	52	69	−17	51
23rd	Oxford United	46	13	10	23	54	75	−21	49
24th	Peterborough United	46	8	13	25	48	76	−28	37

Note that goals scored took precedence over goal difference as a tiebreaker in the Football League.

=== Results summary ===
Overall								Home						Away					
Pld	W	D	L	GF	GA	GD	Pts	W	D	L	GF	GA	GD	W	D	L	GF	GA	GD
46	13	12	21	52	69	−17	51	9	7	7	28	29	−1	4	5	14	24	40	−16

== FA Cup ==
Round	Date	Opponents	Venue	Result	Score F–A	Scorers	Attendance
Third round	8 January 1994	Kidderminster Harriers	H	L	1–2	Harding	19,668

== League Cup ==
Round	Date	Opponents	Venue	Result	Score F–A	Scorers	Attendance
First round 1st leg	17 August 1993	Plymouth Argyle	H	W	3–0	Parris, Frain, Peschisolido	9,304
First round 2nd leg	24 August 1993	Plymouth Argyle	A	L	0–2; 3–2 agg.		3,659
Second round 1st leg	21 September 1993	Aston Villa	H	L	0–1		27,815
Second round 2nd leg	6 October 1993	Aston Villa	A	L	0–1; 0–2 agg.		35,856

== Anglo-Italian Cup ==
Round	Date	Opponents	Venue	Result	Score F–A	Scorers	Attendance
Preliminary round	15 September 1993	Stoke City	A	L	0–2		8,633
Preliminary round	29 September 1993	Wolverhampton Wanderers	H	D	2–2	Wratten 2	2,710

== Appearances and goals ==
Numbers in parentheses denote appearances made as a substitute.
Players with name in italics and marked * were on loan from another club for the whole of their season with Birmingham.
Players marked † left the club during the playing season.
Key to positions: GK – Goalkeeper; DF – Defender; MF – Midfielder; FW – Forward

Players' appearances and goals by competition
Pos.	Nat.	Name	League		FA Cup		League Cup		Anglo-Italian Cup		Total	
Pos.	Nat.	Name	Apps	Goals	Apps	Goals	Apps	Goals	Apps	Goals	Apps	Goals
GK	ENG	Ian Bennett	22	0	1	0	4	0	0	0	28	0
GK	ENG	Kevin Miller	24	0	0	0	4	0	2	0	30	0
DF	ENG	Dave Barnett	8 (1)	0	0	0	0	0	0	0	8 (1)	0
DF	ENG	Ian Clarkson †	0	0	0	0	0	0	1	0	1	0
DF	ENG	Gary Cooper	16 (2)	1	1	0	0	0	0	0	17 (2)	1
DF	IRE	Liam Daish	19	0	0	0	0	0	0	0	19	0
DF	ENG	Richard Dryden	34	0	1	0	4	0	0	0	39	0
DF	CAN	Paul Fenwick	6 (3)	0	0	0	1 (1)	0	2	0	9 (4)	0
DF	ENG	John Frain	26	2	0	0	4	1	0	0	30	3
DF	ENG	Martin Hicks †	0	0	0	0	0	0	1	0	1	0
DF	ENG	Scott Hiley	28	0	1	0	4	0	0	0	33	0
DF	ENG	Richard Huxford *	5	0	0	0	0	0	0	0	5	0
DF	ENG	George Parris	22 (2)	0	1	0	2	1	0	0	25 (2)	1
DF	ENG	Graham Potter †	7	0	0	0	0	0	2	0	9	0
DF	ENG	Darren Rogers	1	0	0	0	0	0	1	0	2	0
DF	ENG	Richard Scott	5 (1)	0	0	0	0 (1)	0	1	0	6 (2)	0
DF	ENG	Chris Whyte	33	0	1	0	4	0	1	0	39	0
DF	ENG	Adam Wratten	0	0	0	0	0	0	0 (1)	2	0 (1)	2
MF	ENG	Neil Doherty	12 (1)	1	0	0	0	0	0	0	12 (1)	1
MF	POR	José Dominguez	3 (2)	0	0	0	0	0	0	0	3 (2)	0
MF	ENG	Louie Donowa	14 (7)	5	1	0	2 (1)	0	1	0	18 (8)	5
MF	ENG	Keith Downing	1	0	0	0	1	0	0	0	2	0
MF	ENG	Paul Harding	14 (2)	0	1	1	0	0	0	0	15 (2)	1
MF	CAN	Lyndon Hooper	1 (4)	0	0	0	1	0	0	0	2 (4)	0
MF	WAL	Leigh Jenkinson *	2 (1)	0	0	0	0	0	0	0	2 (1)	0
MF	ENG	Kenny Lowe	10 (2)	1	1	0	0	0	0	0	11 (2)	1
MF	ENG	Paul Mardon †	5 (3)	0	0	0	2 (1)	0	2	0	9 (4)	0
MF	SCO	Ted McMinn †	19 (3)	0	1	0	1 (1)	0	1	0	22 (4)	0
MF	ENG	Dean Peer †	0	0	0	0	0	0	1	0	1	0
MF	ENG	Steve Robinson	0	0	0	0	0	0	0 (1)	0	0 (1)	0
MF	ENG	Peter Shearer	2	0	0	0	0	0	0	0	2	0
MF	ENG	Carl Shutt	18 (8)	4	0	0	3	0	0	0	21 (8)	4
MF	ENG	Paul Tait	9 (1)	0	0	0	1	0	2	0	12 (1)	0
MF	ENG	Danny Wallace	8 (2)	1	0	0	0	0	0	0	8 (2)	1
MF	ENG	Mark Ward	9	1	0	0	0	0	0	0	9	1
FW	ENG	Simon Black	2	0	0	0	0	0	1 (1)	0	3 (1)	0
FW	ENG	Steve Claridge	17 (1)	7	0	0	0	0	0	0	17 (1)	7
FW	ENG	Miguel de Souza	1 (6)	0	0	0	0	0	0	0	1 (6)	0
FW	ENG	Steve McGavin	6 (2)	1	0	0	0	0	0	0	6 (2)	1
FW	ENG	Trevor Morgan †	0 (1)	0	0	0	0	0	1	0	1 (1)	0
FW	ENG	Paul Moulden	5 (2)	0	0	0	1	0	1	0	7 (2)	0
FW	CAN	Paul Peschisolido	21 (3)	9	0	0	2	1	0	0	23 (3)	10
FW	ENG	Andy Saville	38 (1)	10	1	0	3	0	0	0	42 (1)	10
FW	ENG	David Smith †	22 (3)	2	0 (1)	0	4	0	1	0	27 (4)	2
FW	ENG	Roger Willis	11 (5)	5	0 (1)	0	0	0	0	0	11 (6)	5

== See also ==
- Birmingham City F.C. seasons

== Sources ==
- Matthews, Tony (1995). Birmingham City: A Complete Record. Derby: Breedon Books. ISBN 978-1-85983-010-9.
- Matthews, Tony (2010). Birmingham City: The Complete Record. Derby: DB Publishing. ISBN 978-1-85983-853-2.
- For match dates, league positions and results: "Birmingham City 1993–1994: Results". Statto Organisation. Archived from the original on 4 March 2016.
- For lineups, appearances, goalscorers and attendances: Matthews (2010), Complete Record, pp. 422–23, 477.
