= 1996–97 Birmingham City F.C. season =

Birmingham City F.C.
1996–97 season
- Chairman: Jack Wiseman
- Manager: Trevor Francis
- Ground: St Andrew's
- Football League Division One: 10th
- FA Cup: Fifth round (eliminated by Wrexham)
- League Cup: Second round (eliminated by Coventry City)
- Top goalscorer: League: Paul Devlin (16); All: Paul Devlin (19)
- Highest home attendance: 25,157 vs Bradford City, 12 October 1996
- Lowest home attendance: 13,189 vs Southend United, 8 March 1997
- Average home league attendance: 17,732
Home colours

The 1996–97 season was Birmingham City Football Club's 94th in the Football League. They finished in tenth position in the 24-team Division One, the second tier of the English football league system. They entered the 1996–97 FA Cup at the third round, losing to Wrexham in the fifth, and entered the League Cup in the first round and lost to Coventry City in the second.

== Season summary ==
This was the first season under the managership of playing legend Trevor Francis, appointed in May 1996 after the dismissal of previous incumbent Barry Fry. Francis introduced players with top-level experience such as Manchester United captain Steve Bruce. There were a significant number of transfers and loans with Peterborough United, Fry's new team.

== Football League First Division ==
=== Match details ===
Date	League position	Opponents	Venue	Result	Score F–A	Scorers	Attendance	Report
18 August 1996	8th	Crystal Palace	H	W	1–0	Devlin 25'	18,765	
24 August 1996	5th	Sheffield United	A	D	4–4	Furlong 9', Newell 37', Devlin 75' pen., Hunt 83'	16,332	
7 September 1996	20th	Tranmere Rovers	A	L	0–1		8,548	
10 September 1996	19th	Oldham Athletic	H	D	0–0		17,228	
14 September 1996	14th	Stoke City	H	W	3–1	Furlong (2) 2', 65', Legg 32	18,612	
21 September 1996	17th	Manchester City	A	L	0–1		26,757	
28 September 1996	18th	Queens Park Rangers	H	D	0–0		17,430	
8 October 1996	23rd	Huddersfield Town	A	L	0–3		10,904	
12 October 1996	18th	Bradford City	H	W	3–0	Devlin (2) 1', 50', Hunt 88'	25,157	
15 October 1996	11th	Ipswich Town	H	W	1–0	Bowen 50'	15,664	
18 October 1996	13th	Oxford United	A	D	0–0		7,594	
26 October 1996	15th	Norwich City	H	L	2–3	Devlin (2) 40', 86'	18,869	
29 October 1996	16th	Portsmouth	A	D	1–1	Furlong 22'	6,334	
2 November 1996	20th	Port Vale	A	L	0–3		8,388	
13 November 1996	16th	Bolton Wanderers	H	W	3–1	Furlong 55', Bowen 56', Todd 81' o.g.	17,033	
17 November 1996	14th	Wolverhampton Wanderers	A	W	2–1	Breen 8', Legg 58'	22,627	
20 November 1996	14th	Charlton Athletic	A	L	1–2	Legg 13'	8,574	
23 November 1996	10th	Swindon Town	H	W	1–0	Furlong 29'	16,559	
26 November 1996	9th	Reading	A	D	0–0		8,407	
30 November 1996	7th	Norwich City	A	W	1–0	O'Connor 62'	12,764	
3 December 1996	8th	Barnsley	H	D	0–0		24,004	
7 December 1996	8th	Grimsby Town	H	D	0–0		17,001	
20 December 1996	9th	Southend United	A	D	1–1	Devlin 88'	5,100	
10 January 1997	18th	Stoke City	A	L	0–1		10,049	
18 January 1997	15th	Reading	H	W	4–1	Furlong 33', Devlin (2) 56' pen., 75, Gilkes 89' o.g.	15,363	
29 January 1997	15th	Queens Park Rangers	A	D	1–1	Devlin 36'	12,138	
1 February 1997	16th	Bolton Wanderers	A	L	1–2	Devlin 56'	16,737	
4 February 1997	17th	West Bromwich Albion	H	L	2–3	O'Connor 14', Devlin 55' pen.	21,600	
8 February 1997	19th	Portsmouth	H	L	0–3		15,897	
23 February 1997	20th	Port Vale	H	L	1–2	Devlin 8' pen.	13,192	
26 February 1997	20th	Swindon Town	A	L	1–3	Ablett 22'	7,428	
1 March 1997	20th	Grimsby Town	A	W	2–1	O'Connor 60', Forster 61'	17,609	
4 March 1997	20th	Wolverhampton Wanderers	H	L	1–2	Forster 70'	19,838	
8 March 1997	20th	Southend United	H	W	2–1	Forster 6', O'Connor 37' pen.	13,189	
13 March 1997	16th	Manchester City	H	W	2–0	Furlong 51' pen., Francis 69'	20,084	
16 March 1997	19th	West Bromwich Albion	A	L	0–2		16,125	
22 March 1997	19th	Sheffield United	H	D	1–1	Legg 53'	14,969	
29 March 1997	18th	Crystal Palace	A	W	1–0	Grainger 41'	16,331	
31 March 1997	16th	Charlton Athletic	H	D	0–0		14,525	
5 April 1997	13th	Barnsley	A	W	1–0	Grainger 12'	13,092	
8 April 1997	13th	Oldham Athletic	A	D	2–2	Furlong 17', Grainger 30'	5,942	
12 April 1997	12th	Huddersfield Town	H	W	1–0	Jenkins 90' o.g.	14,394	
15 April 1997	12th	Tranmere Rovers	H	D	0–0		22,364	
19 April 1997	12th	Bradford City	A	W	2–0	Devlin 22', Furlong 86'	15,824	
26 April 1997	10th	Oxford United	H	W	2–0	Devlin 54', Bowen 87'	16,109	
4 May 1997	10th	Ipswich Town	A	D	1–1	Devlin 81'	20,570	

=== League table ===
Pos	Team	Pld	W	D	L	GF	GA	GD	Pts
8	Port Vale	46	17	16	13	58	55	+3	67
9	Queens Park Rangers	46	18	12	16	64	60	+4	66
10	Birmingham City	46	17	15	14	52	48	+4	66
11	Tranmere Rovers	46	17	14	15	63	56	+7	65
12	Stoke City	46	18	10	18	51	57	−6	64

Rules for classification: 1) Points; 2) Goals scored; 3) Goal difference

=== Results summary ===
Overall								Home						Away					
Pld	W	D	L	GF	GA	GD	Pts	W	D	L	GF	GA	GD	W	D	L	GF	GA	GD
46	17	15	14	52	48	+4	66	11	7	5	30	18	+12	6	8	9	22	30	−8

== FA Cup ==
Round	Date	Opponents	Venue	Result	Score F–A	Scorers	Attendance	Report
Third round	4 January 1997	Stevenage Borough	H^{a}	W	2–0	Francis 27', Devlin 64' pen.	15,365	
Fourth round	25 January 1997	Stockport County	H	W	3–1	Furlong 29', Devlin 48', Francis 69'	18,487	
Fifth round	25 January 1997	Wrexham	H	L	1–3	Bruce 37'	21,511	

a. The match was drawn to be played at Stevenage Borough's Broadhall Way ground, but the venue was switched on police advice.

== League Cup ==
Round	Date	Opponents	Venue	Result	Score F–A	Scorers	Attendance	Report
First round 1st leg	21 August 1996	Brighton & Hove Albion	A	W	1–0	Devlin 49' pen.	5,132	
First round 2nd leg	4 September 1996	Brighton & Hove Albion	H	W	2–0; 3–0 agg.	Newell (2) 40', 86'	20,050	
Second round 1st leg	18 September 1996	Coventry City	A	D	1–1	Daish 88'	11,828	
Second round 2nd leg	24 September 1996	Coventry City	H	L	0–1; 1–2 agg.		15,281	

== Transfers ==
=== In ===
Date	Player	Club†	Fee	Ref
August 1996	Steve Sutton	Derby County	Free	
28 October 1996	Chris Holland	Newcastle United	£600,000	
November 1996	Martyn O'Connor	Peterborough United	£500,000^{a}	
20 January 1997	Anders Limpar	Everton	£100,000	
27 January 1997	Kenny Brown	West Ham United	£75,000	
January 1997	Nicky Forster	Brentford	£700,000	
March 1997	Bryan Hughes	Wrexham	£800,000	
May 1997	Darren Wassall	Derby County	Undisclosed^{b}	

a. The deal also included Andy Edwards moving in the other direction.
b. The move was part of the deal in which Jonathan Hunt moved in the other direction for a £500,000 fee.

=== Out ===
Date	Player	Fee	Joined†	Ref
September 1996	Paul Barnes	£350,000	Burnley	
October 1996	Bart Griemink	£25,000	Peterborough United	
October 1996	Steve Finnan	£300,000	Notts County	
October 1996	Gary Poole	£250,000	Charlton Athletic	
November 1996	Jae Martin	£25,000	Lincoln City	
November 1996	Andy Edwards	Undisclosed^{a}	Peterborough United	
December 1996	John Cornforth	£25,000	Wycombe Wanderers	
January 1997	Gary Breen	£2.5m	Coventry City	
10 February 1997	Louie Donowa	Free	Peterborough United	
27 March 1997	John Frain	Free	Northampton Town	
15 April 1997	Anders Limpar	Contract cancelled	(AIK)	
May 1997	Jonathan Hunt	£500,000^{b}	Derby County	
June 1997	Wayne Dyer	Released		
June 1997	Steve Castle	Released		
June 1997	Steve Sutton	Released		

† Brackets round a club denote the player joined that club after his Birmingham City contract expired.
a. The move was part of the deal in which Martyn O'Connor moved in the other direction for a £500,000 fee.
b. The deal also included Darren Wassall moving in the other direction.

=== Loan in ===
Date	Player	Club	Return	Ref
3 September 1996	Chris Holland	Newcastle United	28 October 1996	
October 1996	Marco Gabbiadini	Derby County	One month	
31 October 1996	Matt Jackson	Everton	20 December 1996	
28 November 1996	Terry Cooke	Manchester United	One month	
23 December 1996	Birkir Kristinsson	SK Brann	1 February 1997	
28 December 1996	Kenny Brown	West Ham United	One month	
26 March 1997	Darren Wassall	Derby County	End of season	

=== Loan out ===
Date	Player	Club	Return	Ref
21 August 1996	Jae Martin	Lincoln City	Three months	
9 September 1996	Bart Griemink	Barnsley	One months	
19 September 1996	Ricky Otto	Charlton Athletic	Two months	
1 October 1996	Jon Bass	Carlisle United	One month	
19 December 1996	Mike Newell	West Ham United	February 1997	
24 January 1997	John Frain	Northampton Town	27 March 1997	
3 February 1997	Steve Castle	Leyton Orient	One month	
6 February 1997	Louie Donowa	Walsall	End of season	
13 December 1996	Louie Donowa	Peterborough United	Two months	
6 February 1997	Ricky Otto	Peterborough United	End of season	
17 March 1997	Mike Newell	Bradford City	End of season	

== Appearances and goals ==
Numbers in parentheses denote appearances made as a substitute.
Players with name in italics and marked * were on loan from another club for the whole of their season with Birmingham.
Players marked † left the club during the playing season.
Players listed with no appearances have been in the matchday squad but only as unused substitutes.
Key to positions: GK – Goalkeeper; DF – Defender; MF – Midfielder; FW – Forward

Players' appearances and goals by competition
Pos.	Nat.	Name	League		FA Cup		League Cup		Total		Discipline	
Pos.	Nat.	Name	Apps	Goals	Apps	Goals	Apps	Goals	Apps	Goals	A yellow rectangle, denoting the yellow penalty card shown to a player being cautioned	A red rectangle, denoting the red penalty card shown to a player being sent off
GK	ENG	Ian Bennett	40	0	3	0	4	0	47	0	0	0
GK	NED	Bart Griemink †	0	0	0	0	0	0	0	0	0	0
GK	ISL	Birkir Kristinsson * †	0	0	0	0	0	0	0	0	0	0
GK	ENG	Steve Sutton	6	0	0	0	0	0	6	0	0	0
DF	ENG	Gary Ablett	39 (3)	1	3	0	4	0	46 (3)	1	6	0
DF	ENG	Dave Barnett	6	0	0	0	0	0	6	0	0	0
DF	ENG	Jon Bass	11 (2)	0	1	0	0	0	11 (2)	0	1	0
DF	IRE	Gary Breen †	20 (2)	1	1	0	4	0	25 (2)	1	0	0
DF	ENG	Kenny Brown	11	0	1	0	0	0	12	0	0	0
DF	ENG	Steve Bruce	30 (2)	0	3	1	4	0	37 (2)	1	9	0
DF	ENG	Andy Edwards †	1 (2)	0	0	0	1	0	2 (2)	0	0	0
DF	IRE	Steve Finnan	3	0	0	0	0	0	3	0	0	0
DF	ENG	John Frain †	1	0	0	0	0	0	1	0	0	0
DF	ENG	Martin Grainger	21 (2)	3	2	0	0	0	23 (2)	3	6	1
DF	ENG	Matt Jackson * †	10	0	0	0	0	0	10	0	1	0
DF	JAM	Michael Johnson	28 (7)	0	1 (2)	0	0 (2)	0	29 (11)	0	5	0
DF	ENG	Gary Poole †	9 (1)	0	0	0	3	0	12 (1)	0	4	1
DF	ENG	Darren Wassall *	8	0	0	0	0	0	8	0	3	0
MF	WAL	Jason Bowen	19 (6)	3	1 (2)	0	1 (1)	0	21 (9)	3	1	0
MF	ENG	Steve Castle	4 (4)	0	0	0	4	0	8 (4)	0	2	0
MF	ENG	Terry Cooke * †	1 (3)	0	0	0	0	0	1 (3)	0	0	0
MF	SCO	Paul Devlin	32 (6)	16	3	2	3 (1)	1	38 (7)	19	6	2
MF	ENG	Louie Donowa †	0 (4)	0	0	0	1	0	1 (4)	0	1	0
MF	ENG	Chris Holland	28 (4)	0	3	0	0	0	31 (4)	0	1	0
MF	WAL	Barry Horne	33	0	3	0	4	0	40	0	4	0
MF	ENG	Bryan Hughes	10 (1)	0	0	0	0	0	10 (1)	0	0	0
MF	ENG	Jonathan Hunt	6 (6)	2	1	0	0 (2)	0	7 (8)	2	0	0
MF	WAL	Andy Legg	22 (11)	4	2 (1)	0	3 (1)	0	27 (13)	4	6	0
MF	SWE	Anders Limpar †	3 (1)	0	1	0	0	0	4 (1)	0	1	0
MF	ENG	Martin O'Connor	24 (4)	4	0	0	0	0	24 (4)	4	1	1
MF	ENG	Ricky Otto	1 (3)	0	0	0	0	0	1 (3)	0	0	0
MF	ENG	Steve Robinson	6 (3)	0	0	0	0	0	6 (3)	0	0	0
MF	ENG	Paul Tait	17 (9)	0	1	0	0 (1)	0	18 (10)	0	4	0
FW	ENG	Nicky Forster	4 (3)	3	0	0	0	0	4 (3)	3	0	0
FW	SKN	Kevin Francis	4 (15)	1	1 (1)	2	0	0	5 (16)	3	3	0
FW	ENG	Paul Furlong	37 (6)	10	2	1	4	1	43 (6)	12	5	1
FW	ENG	Marco Gabbiadini * †	0 (2)	0	0	0	0	0	0 (2)	0	0	0
FW	ENG	Mike Newell	11 (4)	1	0 (1)	0	4	2	15 (5)	3	3	0

Players not included in matchday squads
Pos.	Nat.	Name
FW	ENG	Paul Barnes †
MF	WAL	John Cornforth †
MF	ENG	Wayne Dyer
FW	ENG	Jae Martin †

== See also ==
- List of Birmingham City F.C. seasons

== Sources ==
- Matthews, Tony (1995). Birmingham City: A Complete Record. Derby: Breedon Books. ISBN 978-1-85983-010-9.
- Matthews, Tony (2010). Birmingham City: The Complete Record. Derby: DB Publishing. ISBN 978-1-85983-853-2.
- For match dates, league positions and results: "Birmingham City 1996–1997: Results". Statto Organisation. Archived from the original on 4 March 2016.
- For lineups, appearances, goalscorers and attendances: Matthews (2010), Complete Record, pp. 428–29.
- For goal times: "Birmingham Results 1996/97". Soccerbase. Centurycomm.
- For transfers: "Birmingham Transfers 1996/97". Soccerbase. Centurycomm.
- For discipline: individual player pages linked from "Birmingham Squad details 1996/97". Soccerbase. Centurycomm. Note that the Soccerbase figures omit appearances in the away game at Norwich City, so the figures above omit any disciplinary cards received in that game.
