= 1992–93 Birmingham City F.C. season =

Birmingham City F.C.
1992–93 season
- Chairman: Samesh Kumar; (until November 1992); Jack Wiseman
- Manager: Terry Cooper
- Ground: St Andrew's
- Football League First Division: 19th
- FA Cup: First round (eliminated by Reading)
- League Cup: First round (eliminated by Exeter City)
- Anglo-Italian Cup: International group stage
- Top goalscorer: League: Paul Peschisolido, Andy Saville (7); All: John Frain (8)
- Highest home attendance: 22,234 vs Charlton Athletic, 8 May 1993
- Lowest home attendance: 3,102 vs Cambridge United, Anglo-Italian Cup prelim round, 29 September 1992
- Average home league attendance: 12,328
Home colours

The 1992–93 Football League season was Birmingham City Football Club's 90th in the Football League. They competed in the second tier of English football, renamed Football League First Division following the Premier League's split from the Football League. They were promoted to Division One in 1991–92, and finished in 19th position in the 24-team division, avoiding relegation back to the third tier on the final day of the season. They lost in their opening first-round matches in both the 1992–93 FA Cup and the League Cup, and were eliminated at the group stage of the Anglo-Italian Cup.

The club's top league scorers were Paul Peschisolido and Andy Saville with seven goals. If goals in all competitions are counted, the top scorer was John Frain with eight.

Off the field, the collapse of the Bank of Credit and Commerce International (BCCI) put the club owners' business into receivership; in November 1992 BCCI's liquidator put up for sale their 84% holding in the football club. The club continued in administration for four months, until Sport Newspapers proprietor David Sullivan bought it for £700,000. He installed the 23-year-old Karren Brady as managing director and Jack Wiseman remained as chairman. Manager Terry Cooper was given money for signings, and on the last day of the season, the team avoided relegation back to the third tier.

== Football League First Division ==
=== Match details ===
Date	League position	Opponents	Venue	Result	Score F–A	Scorers	Attendance
16 August 1992	8th	Notts County	H	W	1–0	Donowa	10,614
22 August 1992	5th	Cambridge United	A	W	3–0	Rennie 2, Donowa	4,832
30 August 1992	5th	Grimsby Town	H	W	2–1	Gleghorn, Rowbotham	6,807
1 September 1992	2nd	Southend United	H	W	2–0	Tait, Beckford	8,324
5 September 1992	4th	Portsmouth	A	L	0–4		12,152
12 September 1992	4th	Millwall	A	D	0–0		8,581
19 September 1992	4th	Luton Town	A	D	1–1	Rowbotham	8,481
27 September 1992	6th	Wolverhampton Wanderers	H	L	0–4		14,391
3 October 1992	8th	Oxford United	A	D	0–0		7,094
10 October 1992	8th	Leicester City	H	L	0–2		14,443
17 October 1992	10th	Tranmere Rovers	A	L	0–4		7,901
24 October 1992	10th	Bristol Rovers	H	W	2–1	Matthewson, Frain pen	9,874
1 November 1992	10th	Charlton Athletic	A	D	0–0		4,429
4 November 1992	14th	Newcastle United	H	L	2–3	Speedie, Potter	14,376
7 November 1992	17th	Bristol City	A	L	0–3		10,019
21 November 1992	18th	Barnsley	A	L	0–1		5,603
28 November 1992	19th	West Ham United	A	L	1–3	Rodgerson	15,004
5 December 1992	20th	Brentford	H	L	1–3	Frain	8,583
12 December 1992	21st	Derby County	A	L	1–3	Speedie	16,662
19 December 1992	21st	Watford	H	D	2–2	Peschisolido, Frain	7,182
9 January 1993	19th	Luton Town	H	W	2–1	Frain pen, Gayle	9,601
12 January 1993	19th	Swindon Town	A	D	0–0		13,457
17 January 1993	20th	Wolverhampton Wanderers	A	L	1–2	Tait	13,560
22 January 1993	19th	Peterborough United	H	W	2–0	Gayle, Frain pen	10,277
27 January 1993	19th	Southend United	A	L	0–4		4,065
30 January 1993	20th	Cambridge United	H	L	0–2		9,425
6 February 1993	22nd	Notts County	A	L	1–3	Potter	8,550
9 February 1993	22nd	Millwall	H	D	0–0		8,504
13 February 1993	22nd	Portsmouth	H	L	2–3	Sturridge, Peschisolido	10,935
20 February 1993	22nd	Grimsby Town	A	D	1–1	Gayle	5,237
28 February 1993	24th	Leicester City	A	L	1–2	Matthewson	10,284
6 March 1993	22nd	Oxford United	H	W	1–0	Peschisolido	11,104
9 March 1993	22nd	Peterborough United	A	L	1–2	Peschisolido	7,600
13 March 1993	23rd	Bristol City	H	L	0–1		15,611
16 March 1993	23rd	Sunderland	H	W	1–0	Peschisolido	10,934
20 March 1993	21st	Brentford	A	W	2–0	Peschisolido 2	7,532
23 March 1993	18th	Barnsley	H	W	3–0	Saville 2, Moulden	12,664
28 March 1993	20th	Newcastle United	A	D	2–2	Saville, Rodgerson	27,138
3 April 1993	21st	West Ham United	H	L	1–2	Saville	19,053
6 April 1993	22nd	Derby County	H	D	1–1	Moulden	15,424
10 April 1993	19th	Sunderland	A	W	2–1	Moulden, Saville	16,382
12 April 1993	19th	Swindon Town	H	L	4–6	Peer, Frain, Moulden, Saville	17,903
17 April 1993	22nd	Watford	A	L	0–1		9,186
24 April 1993	20th	Tranmere Rovers	H	D	0–0		15,288
1 May 1993	23rd	Bristol Rovers	A	D	3–3	Saville, Mardon, Smith	5,146
8 May 1993	19th	Charlton Athletic	H	W	1–0	Moulden	22,234

=== League table (part) ===
Final Division One table (part)
Pos	Team	Pld	W	D	L	GF	GA	GD	Pts
17th	Notts County	46	12	16	18	55	70	−15	52
18th	Southend United	46	13	13	20	54	64	−10	52
19th	Birmingham City	46	13	12	21	50	72	−22	51
20th	Luton Town	46	10	21	15	48	62	−14	51
21st	Sunderland	46	13	11	22	50	64	−14	50

=== Results summary ===
Overall								Home						Away					
Pld	W	D	L	GF	GA	GD	Pts	W	D	L	GF	GA	GD	W	D	L	GF	GA	GD
46	13	12	21	50	72	−22	51	10	4	9	30	32	−2	3	8	12	20	40	−20

== FA Cup ==
Round	Date	Opponents	Venue	Result	Score F–A	Scorers	Attendance
First round	15 November 1992	Reading	A	L	0–1		7,667

== League Cup ==
Round	Date	Opponents	Venue	Result	Score F–A	Scorers	Attendance
First round 1st leg	18 August 1992	Exeter City	A	D	0–0		3,030
First round 2nd leg	25 August 1992	Exeter City	H	L	1–4	Sale	5,715

== Anglo-Italian Cup ==
Round	Date	Opponents	Venue	Result	Score F–A	Scorers	Attendance
Preliminary round group 2	15 September 1992	Sunderland	A	W	1–0	Sale	5,871
Preliminary round group 2	29 September 1992	Cambridge United	H	D	3–3	Gleghorn, Frain, Sale	3,102
First round group 1	11 November 1992	Bari	H	W	1–0	Cooper	4,970
First round group 1	2 December 1992	Cesena	A	W	2–1	Frain pen, Sturridge	2,090
First round group 1	8 December 1992	Ascoli	H	D	1–1	Sturridge	3,963
First round group 1	16 December 1992	Lucchese	A	L	0–3		139

== Appearances and goals ==
Numbers in parentheses denote appearances made as a substitute.
Players with name in italics and marked * were on loan from another club for the whole of their season with Birmingham.
Players marked † left the club during the playing season.
Key to positions: GK – Goalkeeper; DF – Defender; MF – Midfielder; FW – Forward

Players' appearances and goals by competition
Pos.	Nat.	Name	League		FA Cup		League Cup		Anglo-Italian Cup		Total	
Pos.	Nat.	Name	Apps	Goals	Apps	Goals	Apps	Goals	Apps	Goals	Apps	Goals
GK	AUS	Bob Catlin *	8	0	0	0	0	0	0	0	8	0
GK	ENG	Andy Gosney	21	0	0	0	2	0	1	0	24	0
GK	ENG	Les Sealey *	12	0	0	0	0	0	3	0	15	0
GK	WAL	Martin Thomas	5	0	1	0	0	0	2	0	8	0
DF	ENG	Ian Clarkson	25 (3)	0	0	0	2	0	5	0	32 (3)	0
DF	ENG	Richard Dryden	11	0	0	0	0	0	0	0	11	0
DF	CAN	Paul Fenwick	3 (7)	0	0	0	0	0	1	0	4 (7)	0
DF	ENG	Paul Fitzpatrick	7	0	0	0	0	0	0	0	7	0
DF	ENG	John Frain	45	6	1	0	2	0	5	2	53	8
DF	ENG	Martin Hicks	16 (2)	0	1	0	0	0	3	0	20 (2)	0
DF	ENG	Scott Hiley	7	0	0	0	0	0	0	0	7	0
DF	ENG	Paul Holmes †	12	0	1	0	0	0	0	0	13	0
DF	WAL	Paul Mardon	18 (3)	1	0	0	2	0	0	0	20 (3)	1
DF	ENG	Trevor Matthewson	40	2	1	0	0	0	5	0	46	2
DF	ENG	George Parris	13	0	0	0	0	0	0	0	13	0
DF	ENG	Graham Potter	16 (2)	2	1	0	0	0	4	0	21 (2)	2
DF	ENG	Darren Rogers	14 (3)	0	0 (1)	0	2	0	4	0	20 (4)	0
DF	ENG	Richard Scott	1	0	0	0	0	0	0	0	1	0
MF	ENG	Mark Cooper †	3 (3)	0	1	0	0	0	1	0	5 (3)	0
MF	ENG	Louie Donowa	18 (3)	2	0	0	2	0	2 (2)	0	21 (5)	2
MF	ENG	David Foy †	3	0	0	0	0	0	0	0	3	0
MF	ENG	Dean Peer	13	1	0	0	1	0	0 (1)	0	14 (1)	1
MF	SCO	David Rennie †	15 (3)	2	0	0	1	0	1	0	17 (3)	2
MF	ENG	Ian Rodgerson	24 (7)	2	1	0	1 (1)	0	5	0	31 (8)	2
MF	ENG	David Smith	13	1	0	0	0	0	0	0	13	1
MF	ENG	Paul Tait	28	2	1	0	2	0	6	0	37	2
FW	ENG	Jason Beckford	3	1	0	0	0	0	0	0	3	1
FW	ENG	John Gayle	17 (2)	3	1	0	0	0	3	0	21 (2)	3
FW	ENG	Nigel Gleghorn †	11	1	0	0	2	0	2	1	15	2
FW	ENG	Paul Moulden	13	5	0	0	0	0	0	0	13	5
FW	CAN	Paul Peschisolido	16 (3)	7	0 (1)	0	0	0	1 (1)	0	17 (3)	7
FW	NIR	James Quinn	1 (3)	0	0	0	0	0	0	0	1 (3)	0
FW	WAL	Darran Rowbotham	10 (4)	2	0	0	0 (1)	0	3 (1)	0	13 (6)	2
FW	ENG	Mark Sale †	9 (6)	0	0	0	2	1	3 (1)	2	14 (7)	3
FW	ENG	Andy Saville	10	7	0	0	0	0	0	0	10	7
FW	SCO	David Speedie *	10	2	0	0	0	0	2	0	12	2
FW	ENG	Simon Sturridge	15 (5)	1	1	0	1	0	4	2	21 (5)	3

== See also ==
- Birmingham City F.C. seasons

== Sources ==
- Matthews, Tony (1995). Birmingham City: A Complete Record. Derby: Breedon Books. ISBN 978-1-85983-010-9.
- Matthews, Tony (2010). Birmingham City: The Complete Record. Derby: DB Publishing. ISBN 978-1-85983-853-2.
- For match dates, league positions and results: "Birmingham City football club match record: 1993". 11v11.com. AFS Enterprises.
- For league positions: select date required via dropdown menu: "Birmingham City league performance history: League Division 1 table at close of 1992–93 season". 11v11.com. AFS Enterprises.
- For lineups, appearances, goalscorers and attendances: Matthews (2010), Complete Record, pp. 420–21, 477.
