= Capaldo =

Capaldo may refer to:

- Capaldo, Kansas
- Capaldo (surname)
