= 1998–99 Birmingham City F.C. season =

Birmingham City F.C.
1998–99 season
- Chairman: David Gold
- Manager: Trevor Francis
- Ground: St Andrew's
- Division One: 4th
- Play-offs: Semi-final (eliminated by Watford)
- FA Cup: Third round (eliminated by Leicester City)
- League Cup: Third round (eliminated by Wimbledon)
- Top goalscorer: League: Dele Adebola, Paul Furlong (13); All: Dele Adebola (17)
- Highest home attendance: 29,100 vs Watford, play-off semi-final, 20 May 1999
- Lowest home attendance: 3,443 vs Macclesfield Town, League Cup 2nd round, 22 September 1998
- Average home league attendance: 20,794
Home colours

The 1998–99 season was Birmingham City Football Club's 96th in the Football League. They finished in fourth place in the Football League First Division, qualifying for the promotion play-offs, in which they were eliminated in the semi-final by Watford in a penalty shootout. Birmingham lost to Leicester City in the third round of the FA Cup and to Wimbledon in the third round of the Football League Cup.

== Football League First Division ==
=== Match details ===
Date	League position	Opponents	Venue	Result	Score F–A	Scorers	Attendance	Report
8 August 1998	1st	Port Vale	A	W	2–0	Furlong 21', Adebola 68'	10,465	
16 August 1998	1st	Crystal Palace	H	W	3–1	Adebola 12', O'Connor 29' pen., Forster 90'	16,699	
22 August 1998	2nd	Sheffield United	A	W	2–0	Adebola 55', Forster 81'	17,528	
29 August 1998	4th	Barnsley	H	D	0–0		19,825	
31 August 1998	5th	Bradford City	A	L	1–2	Ndlovu 56'	13,910	
8 September 1998	3rd	Bury	H	W	1–0	Adebola 20'	15,935	
5 September 1998	1st	Stockport County	H	W	2–0	Marsden 15', Hughes 67'	16,429	
12 September 1998	2nd	Bolton Wanderers	A	L	1–3	Rowett 40'	19,637	
19 September 1998	3rd	Grimsby Town	H	L	0–1		17,563	
26 September 1998	7th	Norwich City	A	L	0–2		16,584	
29 September 1998	5th	Portsmouth	A	W	1–0	O'Connor 59 pen.	11,843	
3 October 1998	4th	Tranmere Rovers	H	D	2–2	M. Johnson 40', Ndlovu 72'	17,189	
10 October 1998	3rd	Watford	A	D	1–1	Adebola 22'	10,096	
17 October 1998	2nd	Crewe Alexandra	H	W	3–1	Ndlovu 8', O'Connor 43' pen., Furlong 53'	20,087	
20 October 1998	2nd	Swindon Town	H	D	1–1	Marsden 58'	19,485	
25 October 1998	2nd	Queens Park Rangers	A	W	1–0	Adebola 6'	10,272	
31 October 1998	1st	Huddersfield Town	H	D	1–1	Ndlovu 53'	19,170	
7 November 1998	3rd	West Bromwich Albion	A	W	3–1	Ndlovu 5', 34', Adebola 12'	19,472	
14 November 1998	4th	Oxford United	H	L	0–1		18,216	
22 November 1998	8th	Wolverhampton Wanderers	A	L	1–3	Furlong 21'	23,037	
28 November 1998	4th	Bristol City	H	W	4–2	M. Johnson 5', Ndlovu 11', Forster (2) 42', 72'	17,577	
5 December 1998	7th	Ipswich Town	A	L	0–1		15,901	
12 December 1998	4th	Oxford United	A	W	7–1	Rowett (2) 16', 31', Furlong (2) 17', 43', Grainger 55', Ndlovu 72', Hughes 89'	7,189	
19 December 1998	7th	Sunderland	H	D	0–0		22,095	
26 December 1998	4th	Sheffield United	H	W	1–0	Furlong 20' pen.	22,005	
28 December 1998	3rd	Bury	A	W	4–2	Furlong (2) 32', 56', O'Connor 35', Adebola 74'	7,024	
9 January 1999	2nd	Port Vale	H	W	1–0	Furlong 25'	18,632	
16 January 1999	4th	Barnsley	A	D	0–0		17,114	
31 January 1999	4th	Bradford City	H	W	2–1	Furlong (2) 45', 90' pen.	19,291	
6 February 1999	5th	Crystal Palace	A	D	1–1	Furlong 50' pen.	15,996	
13 February 1999	5th	Stockport County	A	L	0–1		9,056	
21 February 1999	5th	Bolton Wanderers	H	D	0–0		26,051	
27 February 1999	5th	Grimsby Town	A	W	3–0	Ndlovu 36', Adebola 85', Rowett 90'	7,807	
2 March 1999	5th	Norwich City	H	D	0–0		20,749	
6 March 1999	4th	Portsmouth	H	W	4–1	Adebola (2) 26', 60', Forster 50', Hughes 84'	20,617	
9 March 1999	4th	Tranmere Rovers	A	W	1–0	M. Johnson 46'	7,184	
13 March 1999	4th	West Bromwich Albion	H	W	4–0	Adebola (2) 24', 62', Ndlovu 50', Grainger 88'	29,060	
20 March 1999	4th	Huddersfield Town	A	D	1–1	M. Johnson 47'	14,667	
2 April 1999	4th	Crewe Alexandra	A	D	0–0		5,582	
5 April 1999	4th	Watford	H	L	1–2	Holdsworth 87'	24,877	
10 April 1999	4th	Swindon Town	A	W	1–0	Rowett 83'	8,896	
17 April 1999	4th	Wolverhampton Wanderers	H	L	0–1		28,143	
20 April 1999	4th	Queens Park Rangers	H	W	1–0	Forinton 85'	20,888	
24 April 1999	4th	Bristol City	A	W	2–1	Grainger 48' pen., Ndlovu 70'	15,845	
2 May 1999	4th	Ipswich Town	H	W	1–0	Furlong 60'	27,685	
9 May 1999	4th	Sunderland	A	L	1–2	Grainger 38'	41,634	

=== League table ===
Pos	Team	Pld	W	D	L	GF	GA	GD	Pts	Qualification or relegation
2	Bradford City (P)	46	26	9	11	82	47	+35	87	Promotion to the Premier League
3	Ipswich Town	46	26	8	12	69	32	+37	86	Qualification for the First Division play-offs
4	Birmingham City	46	23	12	11	66	37	+29	81	Qualification for the First Division play-offs
5	Watford (O, P)	46	21	14	11	65	56	+9	77	Qualification for the First Division play-offs
6	Bolton Wanderers	46	20	16	10	78	59	+19	76	Qualification for the First Division play-offs

Rules for classification: 1) Points; 2) Goals scored; 3) Goal difference
(O) Play-off winners; (P) Promoted

=== Results summary ===
Overall								Home						Away					
Pld	W	D	L	GF	GA	GD	Pts	W	D	L	GF	GA	GD	W	D	L	GF	GA	GD
46	23	12	11	66	37	+29	81	12	7	4	32	15	+17	11	5	7	34	22	+12

=== Play-offs ===
Round	Date	Opponents	Venue	Result	Score F–A	Scorers	Attendance	Report
Semifinal 1st leg	16 May 1999	Watford	A	L	0–1		18,535	
Semifinal 2nd leg	20 May 1999	Watford	H	W	1–0; 1–1 agg.	Adebola 2'	29,100	
Watford won 7–6 on penalties. Birmingham scorers: Grainger, Rowett, Bradbury, Hughes, Purse, Poole.

== FA Cup ==
Round	Date	Opponents	Venue	Result	Score F–A	Scorers	Attendance	Report
Third round	2 January 1999	Leicester City	A	L	2–4	Robinson 35', Adebola 89'	19,846	

== League Cup ==
Round	Date	Opponents	Venue	Result	Score F–A	Scorers	Attendance	Report
First round 1st leg	11 August 1998	Millwall	H	W	2–0	Adebola 70', M. Johnson 87'	14,133	
First round 2nd leg	19 August 1998	Millwall	A	D	1–1; 3–1 agg.	Adebola 45'	4,478	
Second round 1st leg	15 September 1998	Macclesfield Town	A	W	3–0	Forster 66', Marsden 70', Rowett 89'	2,275	
Second round 2nd leg	22 September 1998	Macclesfield Town	H	W	6–0; 9–0 agg.	Ndlovu (2) 7', 19', Askey 37' o.g., Marsden 57', Rowett 66', M. Johnson 89'	3,443	
Third round	28 October 1998	Wimbledon	H	L	1–2	Marsden 34'	11,845	

== Transfers ==
=== In ===
Date	Player	Club	Fee	Ref
13 August 1998	Gary Rowett	Derby County	£1m	
10 December 1998	Simon Marsh	Oxford United	£250,000	
4 February 1999	Graham Hyde	Sheffield Wednesday	Free	
23 March 1999	David Holdsworth	Sheffield United	£1.25m	

=== Out ===
Date	Player	Fee	Joined	Ref
2 July 1998	Steve Bruce	c. £200,000	Sheffield United	
23 October 1998	Steve Barnes	Free	Barnet	
13 January 1999	Paul Tait	Free	Oxford United	
1 February 1999	Chris Marsden	£800,000	Southampton	
22 June 1999	Nicky Forster	£650,000	Reading	

=== Loan in ===
Date	Player	Club	Return	Ref
19 December 1998	Fumaça	Catuense	27 January 1999	
25 March 1999	Lee Bradbury	Crystal Palace	End of season	

== Appearances and goals ==
Numbers in parentheses denote appearances made as a substitute.
Players with name in italics and marked * were on loan from another club for the whole of their season with Birmingham.
Players marked † left the club during the playing season.
Players listed with no appearances have been in the matchday squad but only as unused substitutes.
Key to positions: GK – Goalkeeper; DF – Defender; MF – Midfielder; FW – Forward

Players' appearances and goals by competition
Pos.	Nat.	Name	League		FA Cup		League Cup		Play-offs		Total		Discipline	
Pos.	Nat.	Name	Apps	Goals	Apps	Goals	Apps	Goals	Apps	Goals	Apps	Goals	A yellow rectangle, denoting the yellow penalty card shown to a player being cautioned	A red rectangle, denoting the red penalty card shown to a player being sent off
GK	ENG	Ian Bennett	10	0	0	0	4	0	0	0	14	0	0	0
GK	ENG	Kevin Poole	36	0	1	0	1	0	2	0	40	0	0	0
DF	ENG	Gary Ablett	23 (3)	0	1	0	4	0	0	0	28 (3)	0	1	0
DF	ENG	Jon Bass	9 (2)	0	0	0	0	0	0	0	9 (2)	0	2	0
DF	ENG	Simon Charlton	27 (1)	0	0	0	3	0	0	0	30 (1)	0	4	1
DF	ENG	Jerry Gill	3	0	0	0	1	0	0	0	4	0	1	0
DF	ENG	Martin Grainger	30 (10)	4	0 (1)	0	2 (1)	0	2	0	34 (12)	4	11	0
DF	ENG	David Holdsworth	8 (1)	0	0	0	0	0	2	0	10 (1)	0	4	1
DF	JAM	Michael Johnson	43 (3)	4	1	0	4	2	2	0	50 (3)	6	6	0
DF	ENG	Simon Marsh	6 (1)	0	1	0	0	0	0	0	7 (1)	0	0	0
DF	ENG	Darren Purse	11 (9)	0	0	0	2 (1)	0	0 (1)	0	13 (11)	0	2	0
DF	ENG	Simon Rea	0	0	0	0	0	0	0	0	0	0	0	0
DF	ENG	Gary Rowett	42	5	1	0	4	2	2	0	49	7	5	0
DF	ENG	Darren Wassall	0 (3)	0	0	0	0	0	0	0	0 (3)	0	0	0
MF	GER	Tony Hey	0	0	0	0	0	0	0	0	0	0	0	0
MF	ENG	Chris Holland	7 (6)	0	0	0	1 (4)	0	1 (1)	0	9 (11)	0	0	0
MF	ENG	Bryan Hughes	20 (8)	3	0 (1)	0	1 (1)	0	1	0	22 (10)	3	2	0
DF	ENG	Graham Hyde	13	0	0	0	0	0	0	0	13	0	4	1
MF	ENG	Chris Marsden †	20	2	0	0	5	3	0	0	25	5	4	0
MF	NIR	Jon McCarthy	35 (8)	0	1	0	5	0	2	0	43 (8)	0	6	0
MF	CAY	Martyn O'Connor	35 (2)	4	1	0	4	0	2	0	42 (2)	4	7	0
MF	ENG	Steve Robinson	20 (11)	0	1	1	2	0	1	0	24 (11)	1	1	0
FW	NGA	Dele Adebola	33 (6)	13	1	1	4	2	1 (1)	1	39 (7)	17	3	0
FW	ENG	Lee Bradbury *	6 (1)	0	0	0	0	0	1 (1)	0	7 (2)	0	1	0
FW	ENG	Howard Forinton	0 (3)	1	0	0	1 (1)	0	0	0	1 (4)	1	0	0
FW	ENG	Nicky Forster	8 (24)	5	0 (1)	0	2 (2)	1	0	0	10 (27)	6	0	0
FW	ENG	Paul Furlong	24 (5)	13	1	0	1	0	2	0	28 (5)	13	4	0
FW	ENG	Andrew Johnson	0 (3)	0	0	0	0 (2)	0	0	0	0 (5)	0	2	0
FW	ZIM	Peter Ndlovu	37 (6)	11	1	0	4	2	1 (1)	0	43 (7)	13	3	1

Players not included in matchday squads
Pos.	Nat.	Name
MF	ENG	Steve Barnes †
MF	ENG	Paul Tait †
MF	BRA	Fumaça *

== See also ==
- List of Birmingham City F.C. seasons
