= Paul Peschisolido =

Canadian soccer player and coach (born 1971)

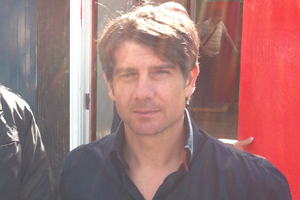
- Peschisolido in 2011

Personal information
- Full name: Paolo Pasquale Peschisolido
- Date of birth: 25 May 1971 (age 55)
- Place of birth: Scarborough, Ontario, Canada
- Height: 5 ft 7 in (1.70 m)
- Position: Striker

Senior career*
Years	Team	Apps	(Gls)
1989–1992	Toronto Blizzard	72	(32)
1990–1991	Kansas City Comets (indoor)	43	(24)
1992–1994	Birmingham City	43	(16)
1994–1996	Stoke City	66	(19)
1996	Birmingham City	9	(1)
1996–1997	West Bromwich Albion	45	(18)
1997–2001	Fulham	95	(24)
2000	→ Queens Park Rangers (loan)	5	(1)
2001	→ Sheffield United (loan)	5	(2)
2001	→ Norwich City (loan)	5	(0)
2001–2004	Sheffield United	79	(17)
2004–2007	Derby County^{[A]}	91	(20)
2007–2008	Luton Town	4	(0)
2009	St Patrick's Athletic	0	(0)
Total		562	(174)

International career
1986–1987	Canada U-17	7	(0)
1988	Canada U-20	6	(2)
1990–1992	Canada U-23	12	(5)
1992–2004	Canada	53	(10)

Managerial career
- 2009–2012: Burton Albion
Medal record
Representing Canada
Men's soccer
CONCACAF Gold Cup
Winner	2000 United States
- * Club domestic league appearances and goals

Paolo Pasquale Peschisolido (born 25 May 1971) is a Canadian former soccer player and coach. Peschisolido was coach of English League Two club Burton Albion from May 2009 until March 2012.

A forward, Peschisolido began his career in the Canadian Soccer League with the Toronto Blizzard and played in the Major Indoor Soccer League with the Kansas City Comets before moving to England.

Over 16 seasons he scored 118 goals from 447 appearances in the Football League, playing for nine different clubs: Birmingham City, Stoke City, West Bromwich Albion, Fulham, Queens Park Rangers, Sheffield United, Norwich City, Derby County and Luton Town.

Peschisolido represented his country from U-16 level upwards to the senior level spanning from 1986 to 2004, making his senior debut for the Canadian national team in 1992. He went on to play 53 times for Canada, scoring 10 goals, in a 12-year senior international career. On 1 June 2013, he was inducted into the Canadian Soccer Hall of Fame.

== Club career ==
=== Early years ===
Peschisolido was born in Scarborough, now part of Toronto, Ontario. He began his professional playing career when still a high-schooler with Archbishop Denis O'Connor Catholic High School in Ajax. Peschisolido led the team to OFSAA finals in his last year then moved on as a trainee with the Toronto Blizzard of the Canadian Soccer League, where he was named the "Rookie of the Year" in 1989. He also played the 1990–91 Major Indoor Soccer League season with the Kansas City Comets, being named the league's 'Newcomer of the Year'.

=== Birmingham City ===
After spending a year with the Juventus academy, returning homesick saw him offered the opportunity from his former national youth team coach Tony Taylor to join Birmingham City for £25,000 in November 1992. He was joint top scorer in each of his two seasons with the club.

=== Stoke City ===
In August 1994, he moved on to Stoke City in a £400,000 plus player exchange deal involving Dave Regis. He was top scorer with 15 goals for the 1994–95 season, and remained at Stoke until March 1996, when he returned to Birmingham until the end of the 1995–96 season, scoring once in nine appearances.

=== West Bromwich Albion ===
Peschisolido signed for West Bromwich Albion in a £600,000 deal in July 1996. He made his first appearance for the club in the 3–1 home League Cup defeat to Colchester United on 3 September 1996. Four days later, Peschisolido scored just nine minutes into his Albion league debut, as the Midlands side ran out 2–0 winners at Queens Park Rangers. He was joint top League scorer that season for the club.

=== Fulham ===
After 51 appearances and 21 goals for West Brom, he dropped down a division to join Fulham in October 1997, for a £1.1 million transfer fee. He appeared 37 times for 'the Cottagers' in the 1997–98 season, scoring 13 goals, before helping the team win promotion as Division Two champions the following year. In the next two seasons, he produced 10 goals from 40 appearances and 7 from 36 appearances in all competitions.

After appearing in two League Cup matches for Fulham in the 2000–01 season, Peschisolido was loaned to Queens Park Rangers in November 2000. He scored on his QPR debut, playing alongside the much taller Peter Crouch in a 1–1 draw against Portsmouth. In January 2001, he went on loan again, this time to Sheffield United, also scoring on his debut for "the Blades", before spending a further loan period at Norwich City.

=== Sheffield United ===
He later re-joined Sheffield United in a permanent deal for £250,000, after agreeing to a wage cut. He was a key player in the 2002–03 season, helping the club reach the semi-finals of the 2003 FA Cup and League Cup and the Division One play-off final. In the play-off semi-final against Nottingham Forest, Sheffield United came back from a two-goal deficit to take the game into extra time. Peschisolido came off the substitutes' bench at the midpoint of added time to score the goal that took the lead, which is remembered not just for its impact on the game but also for the player's frantic celebrations afterwards. In the 2003 FA Cup semi-final against Arsenal, he was denied an equalising goal by goalkeeper David Seaman, who made a one-handed "claw-back" save from Peschisolido's header which three-time Best European Goalkeeper Peter Schmeichel later described as "the best stop I've ever seen in the flesh".

=== Derby County ===
In March 2004, Peschisolido joined Derby County in a swap deal, with Izale McLeod moving to United on loan for the rest of the season. Once again he scored on debut, contributing four goals in his first three appearances, including two against local rivals Nottingham Forest, one of which was gifted to him by goalkeeper Barry Roche, who sliced an attempted clearance after the ball deflected off a plastic coffee cup on the pitch. After Derby avoided relegation in 2004, Peschisolido's "knack for scoring vital goals from the substitutes' bench" helped them reach the playoffs in 2005 and 2007, though he started in the playoff final against West Bromwich Albion at Wembley Stadium, which Derby won 1–0 to earn promotion to the Premier League. Peschisolido was released by the club at the end of that season.

=== Luton Town ===
On 16 July 2007 Peschisolido signed for Luton Town on a one-year deal. He played just four league matches and one cup match for Luton, scoring once in the Football League Trophy against Northampton Town, before an ankle problem kept him out of action from September onwards. After the injury failed to respond to injections it was confirmed in December that he would require an operation, ruling him out for the rest of the season. Luton released Peschisolido at the end of the 2007–08 season, following their relegation to League Two. Failing to fully recover from injury, he would subsequently retire and not seek a new club. By this time, he had accumulated 447 Football League appearances and 118 goals over 16 years, predominantly in the second tier of English professional soccer. He also made 76 cup appearances, scoring 22 goals.

== International career ==
Peschisolido played in all of Canada's three games at the 1987 FIFA U-16 World Championship which were held in Canada. He earned seven caps at the U-17 level, six caps at the U-20 level scoring two goals, and 12 caps at the U-23 level scoring five goals.

He made his senior national team debut for Canada on 13 June 1992 in a match against Hong Kong at Varsity Stadium where he scored his first international goal. Peschisolido formed effective striker partnerships for Canada with Alex Bunbury and Carlo Corazzin over their years with the national team. Peschisolido scored the majority of his international goals between 1995 and 1996 at Commonwealth Stadium that included a number of World Cup qualification matches which led to the venue becoming lovingly nicknamed St. Paul's Cathedral amongst the Canadian fans and press. He scored his last international goal on his 50th cap on 13 June 2004 in a World Cup qualification match against Belize, exactly 12 years to the day from his first international goal and first cap. He earned a total of 53 caps from 1992 to 2004, and scored 10 goals making him tied 9th with Tomasz Radzinski in all-time scoring for Canada. He represented Canada in four FIFA World Cup qualification campaigns (1994, 1998, 2002, and 2006) in 26 FIFA World Cup qualification matches He played in the Canadian squad that won the 2000 CONCACAF Gold Cup and played in all of Canada's three games at the 2001 FIFA Confederations Cup. His final international cap was on 4 September 2004 at Commonwealth Stadium in a World Cup qualification match against Honduras.

== Coaching career ==
On 15 January 2009, he was appointed as Jeff Kenna's assistant coach at League of Ireland club St Patrick's Athletic. Both Kenna and Peschisolido registered as players for the 2009 season in case of emergency. On 15 May 2009, he resigned from this post for "personal reasons" with immediate effect.

Three days later, on 18 May 2009, he was appointed head coach of Burton Albion taking over from caretaker coach Roy McFarland, who had taken the club to promotion to League Two after the departure of Nigel Clough. Peschisolido was in charge of Burton for almost three years but was dismissed on 17 March 2012, following a winless run of 14 games.

== Personal life ==
In 1995, Peschisolido married Karren Brady, who was at the time managing director of Birmingham City F.C. The couple have two children, daughter Sophia and son Paolo. Peschisolido is a cousin of former National Hockey League (NHL) player Mike Ricci.

== Career statistics ==
=== Club ===
Club	Season	League			FA Cup		League Cup		Other		Total	
Club	Season	Division	Apps	Goals	Apps	Goals	Apps	Goals	Apps	Goals	Apps	Goals
Toronto Blizzard	1989	Canadian Soccer League	26	10	—		—		2 (Note: Appearances in the Canadian Soccer League playoffs)	0	28	10
Toronto Blizzard	1990	Canadian Soccer League	21	13	—		—		2	1	23	14
Toronto Blizzard	1991	Canadian Soccer League	12	5	—		—		3	1	15	6
Toronto Blizzard	1992	Canadian Soccer League	13	4	—		—		—		13	4
Toronto Blizzard	Total		72	32	0	0	0	0	7	2	79	34
Kansas City Comets (indoor)	1990–91	Major Indoor Soccer League	43	24	—		—		5 (Note: Appearances in the Major Indoor Soccer League playoffs)	1	48	25
Birmingham City	1992–93	First Division	19	7	1	0	0	0	2 (Note: Appearances in Anglo-Italian Cup)	0	22	7
Birmingham City	1993–94	First Division	24	9	0	0	2	1	0	0	26	10
Birmingham City	Total		43	16	1	0	2	1	2	0	48	17
Stoke City	1994–95	First Division	40	13	2	0	3	2	4	0	49	15
Stoke City	1995–96	First Division	26	6	1	0	3	1	2	2	32	9
Stoke City	Total		66	19	3	0	6	3	6	2	81	24
Birmingham City	1995–96	First Division	9	1	0	0	0	0	0	0	9	1
West Bromwich Albion	1996–97	First Division	37	15	1	0	1	0	0	0	39	15
West Bromwich Albion	1997–98	First Division	8	3	0	0	4	3	0	0	12	6
West Bromwich Albion	Total		45	18	1	0	5	3	0	0	51	21
Fulham	1997–98	Second Division	32	13	3	0	0	0	2 (Note: Appearances in Second Division play-offs)	0	37	13
Fulham	1998–99	Second Division	33	7	5	2	2	1	0	0	40	10
Fulham	1999–2000	First Division	30	4	2	0	4	3	0	0	36	7
Fulham	2000–01	First Division	0	0	0	0	2	0	0	0	2	0
Fulham	Total		95	24	10	2	8	4	2	0	115	30
Queens Park Rangers (loan)	2000–01	First Division	5	1	0	0	0	0	0	0	5	1
Sheffield United (loan)	2000–01	First Division	5	2	0	0	0	0	0	0	5	2
Norwich City (loan)	2000–01	First Division	5	0	0	0	0	0	0	0	5	0
Sheffield United	2001–02	First Division	29	6	0	0	2	0	0	0	31	6
Sheffield United	2002–03	First Division	23	3	4	1	5	2	2 (Note: Appearances in First Division play-offs)	1	34	7
Sheffield United	2003–04	First Division	27	8	4	1	1	0	0	0	32	9
Sheffield United	Total		79	17	8	2	8	2	2	1	97	22
Derby County	2003–04	First Division	11	4	0	0	0	0	0	0	11	4
Derby County	2004–05	Championship	32	8	1	1	1	0	2 (Note: Appearances in Championship play-offs)	0	36	9
Derby County	2005–06	Championship	34	5	2	2	1	0	0	0	37	7
Derby County	2006–07	Championship	14	3	2	1	2	0	1	0	19	4
Derby County	Total		91	20	5	4	4	0	3	0	103	24
Luton Town	2007–08	League One	4	0	0	0	0	0	1 (Note: Appearances in Football League Trophy)	1	5	1
Career Total			562	174	28	8	33	13	28	7	651	202

=== International ===
National team	Year	Apps	Goals
Canada	1992	4	1
Canada	1993	7	0
Canada	1995	6	4
Canada	1996	5	3
Canada	1997	5	0
Canada	1999	1	0
Canada	2000	12	1
Canada	2001	5	0
Canada	2003	3	0
Canada	2004	5	1
Total		53	10

=== International goals ===
Scores and results list Canada's goal tally first.

#	Date	Venue	Opponent	Score	Result	Competition
1	13 June 1992	Varsity Stadium, Toronto, Canada	Hong Kong	1–0	3–1	Columbus 500 Cup
2	22 May 1995	Commonwealth Stadium, Edmonton, Canada	Northern Ireland	1–0	2–0	Canada Cup
3	22 May 1995	Commonwealth Stadium, Edmonton, Canada	Northern Ireland	2–0	2–0	Canada Cup
4	28 May 1995	Commonwealth Stadium, Edmonton, Canada	Chile	1–0	1–2	Canada Cup
5	3 August 1995	Varsity Stadium, Toronto, Canada	Trinidad and Tobago	3–0	3–1	Caribana Cup
6	30 August 1996	Commonwealth Stadium, Edmonton, Canada	Panama	2–0	3–1	1998 FIFA World Cup qualification
7	10 October 1996	Commonwealth Stadium, Edmonton, Canada	Cuba	2–0	2–0	1998 FIFA World Cup qualification
8	13 October 1996	Commonwealth Stadium, Edmonton, Canada	Cuba	1–0	2–0	1998 FIFA World Cup qualification
9	30 May 2000	Winnipeg Soccer Complex, Winnipeg, Canada	Honduras	1–0	2–1	Friendly
10	13 June 2004	Richardson Memorial Stadium, Kingston, Canada	Belize	1–0	4–0	2006 FIFA World Cup Qualification

== Managerial statistics ==
As of 17 March 2012.

Team	Nat	From	To	Record				
Team	Nat	From	To	G	W	D	L	Win %
Burton Albion	England	18 May 2009	17 March 2012	141	44	36	61	31.21

== Honours ==
=== Player ===
Fulham

- Football League Second Division: 1998–99

Derby County

- Football League Championship play-offs: 2007

Canada

- CONCACAF Gold Cup: 2000

Individual

- Canadian Soccer League Rookie of the Year: 1989
- Canadian Soccer League All-Star Team: 1990
- Canadian Soccer League All-Star team: 1992
- Major Indoor Soccer League Newcomer of the Year: 1991
- Canadian Player of the Year: 1996
- Canadian Soccer Hall of Fame: 2013

== Notes ==
A. Soccerbase's stats for the match between Derby County and Birmingham City on 9 March 2007 fail to include appearances by substitutes for either side, one of whom was Peschisolido. Therefore, until and unless they correct it, he should have one more appearance for Derby than given on his Soccerbase page.
