= Bolehall Swifts F.C. =

Association football club in England

Bolehall Swifts
- Full name: Bolehall Swifts Football Club
- Nickname: The Swifts
- Founded: 1953
- Ground: Rene Road Ground, Tamworth
- Chairman: Craig Hayward
- Manager: Paul Hathaway
- League: Midland League Division Two
- 2024–25: Midland League Division Two, 9th of 15
- Website: bolehallswiftsfc.co.uk
Home colours	Away colours

Bolehall Swifts Football Club is a football club based in Bolehall, a suburb of Tamworth, Staffordshire, England. They are currently members of the Midland League Division Two and play at the Rene Road Ground.

== History ==
The club was established in 1953. They joined the Tamworth & Trent Valley League, winning the League Shield and Agnes Durham Cup in their first season. The club later won the Coleshill Charity Cup in 1955–56 and the Fazeley Charity Cup in 1975–76.

After transferring to the Sutton District League, they moved on to the City & Suburban League, the Mercian League and then the Staffordshire County League (South). In 1980 the club moved up to Division Three of the Midland Combination. Division Three was renamed Division Two in 1983, and Bolehall were Division Two champions in 1984–85, also winning the Challenge Vase and the Fazeley Charity Cup. Following promotion to Division One, they finished fifth in Division One the following season and were promoted to the Premier Division.

In 1994 Bolehall were founder members of the Midland Alliance. However, after finishing second-from-bottom of the league in its inaugural season, they finished last in 1995–96 and were relegated back to the Premier Division of the Midland Combination. The club remained in the Premier Division until 2014, winning the Challenge Cup in 1997–98, the Walsall Senior Cup in 2001–02 and the Birmingham Midweek Floodlit Cup in 2013–14. In 2014 the Midland Combination and Midland Alliance merged to form the Midland League, with Bolehall placed in Division One. The club won the Fazeley Charity Cup again in 2014–15.

In 2017–18 Bolehall finished second-from-bottom of Division One and were relegated to Division Two. They finished second-from-bottom of Division Two the following season and bottom in 2021–22.

== Ground ==
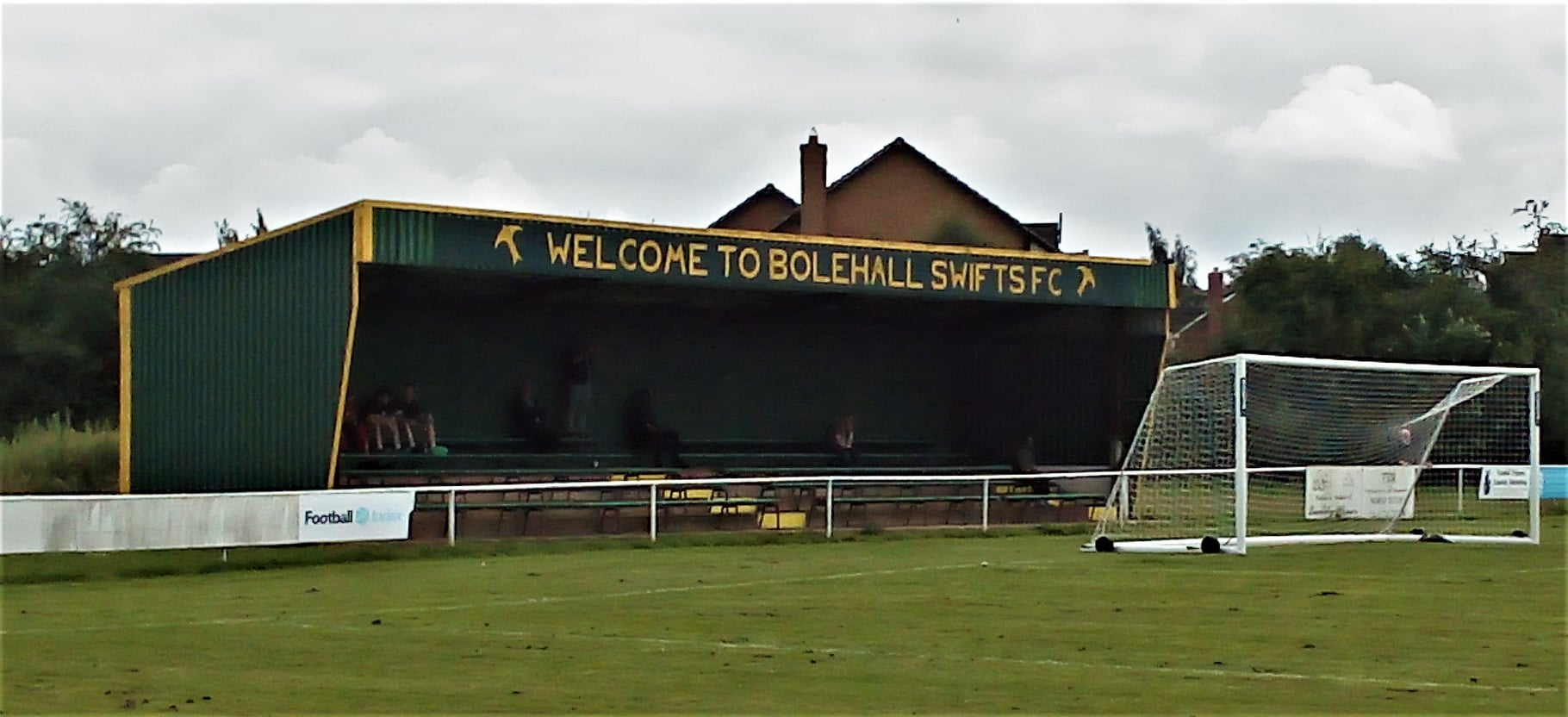
The main stand

The club initially played behind the Jolly Sailor pub near the Castle Grounds in Tamworth, using an old double decker bus as changing rooms. They later moved to Morrows' Field, located to the rear of the Gate Inn in Amington, before purchasing some allotments on Rene Road from a local farmer in 1959 for £350.

The new Rene Road ground was opened in August 1961 with a friendly against Tamworth WMC. A 150-seat stand known as the "Welcome to Bolehall Swifts Stand" was built behind one goal, with the standing only "Founded 1953 Stand" on one side of the pitch.

== Managerial history ==
Period	Manager
	(England) Mick Hill
1993–1994	(England) Roger Brown
1996–2002	(England) Ron Tranter
2002–2003	(Scotland) John Capaldi
2003–2004	(England) Ron Tranter
2004–2007	(England) Rob Masefield
2007–2008	(England) Paul Barnes
2009–2010	(England) Gary Walker
2010	(England) Peter Frain
2010–2013	(England) Daren Fulford
2013–2015	(England) Dave Haywood
2015	(England) Mark Taylor
2015–2016	(England) Craig Haywood
2016–2017	(England) Joe Obi
2017–2018	(England) Steve Johnson
2018–2019	(England) Jon Huckfield
2019	(England) Brad Roberts
2019–2021	(England) Gareth Hathaway
2021–2024	(England) Matt Minton
2024- 2025	(England) Jon Huckfield
2025–	Paul Hathaway

== Honours ==
- Midland Combination
  - Division Two champions 1984–85
  - Challenge Cup winners 1997–98
  - Challenge Vase winners 1984–85
- Tamworth & Trent Valley League
  - League Shield winners 1953–54
  - Agnes Durham Cup winners 1953–54
- Walsall Senior Cup
  - Winners 2001–02
- Coleshill Charity Cup
  - Winners 1955–56
- Fazeley Charity Cup
  - Winners 1975–76, 1984–85, 2014–15
- Birmingham Midweek Floodlit Cup
  - Winners 2013–14

== Records ==
- Best FA Cup performance: First qualifying round, 1994–95, 1995–96
- Best FA Vase performance: Third round, 2013–14, 2014–15

== See also ==
- Bolehall Swifts F.C. players
- Bolehall Swifts F.C. managers
