= Louie Donowa =

English footballer

Personal information
- Full name: Brian Louie Donowa
- Date of birth: 24 September 1964 (age 62)
- Place of birth: Ipswich, England
- Height: 5 ft 9 in (1.75 m)
- Position: Midfielder

Youth career
- 1980–1982: Norwich City

Senior career*
Years	Team	Apps	(Gls)
1982–1986	Norwich City	62	(11)
1985	→ Stoke City (loan)	4	(1)
1986–1989	Deportivo La Coruña	85	(20)
1989	Willem II	13	(4)
1989–1990	Ipswich Town	23	(1)
1990–1991	Bristol City	24	(3)
1991–1997	Birmingham City	116	(18)
1993	→ Burnley (loan)	4	(0)
1993	→ Crystal Palace (loan)	0	(0)
1994	→ Shrewsbury Town (loan)	4	(0)
1996	→ Walsall (loan)	6	(1)
1996–1997	→ Peterborough United (loan)	6	(1)
1997	Peterborough United	17	(0)
1997	Walsall	6	(0)
1997–1998	Ayr United	9	(0)
1998	Inter Turku	4	(1)
1999–2000	Boston United	1	(0)
2000	Tamworth		

International career
1985	England U21	4	(0)
- * Club domestic league appearances and goals

Brian Louie Donowa (born 24 September 1964) is an English former professional footballer who played as a winger. He made nearly 400 appearances for a variety of clubs in the Football League and also played in several other European countries.

== Playing career ==
Born in Ipswich, Suffolk, Donowa began his career with Norwich City. He was a member of the Norwich youth team that won the FA Youth Cup in 1983 and the side that won the League Cup in 1985. He was capped by England under-21s during his time at Carrow Road. In 1985–86 Donowa spent time out on loan at Stoke City where he played five times scoring once which came in a 3–2 win away at Millwall. In March 1986 he signed for Spanish club Deportivo de La Coruña for a fee of £50,000. After four years at the Estadio Riazor he played for a short time at Dutch side Willem II.

In 1989, he returned to England and played for Ipswich Town, Bristol City, Birmingham City, Burnley, Crystal Palace, Shrewsbury Town, Walsall and Peterborough United. He then played in Scotland for Ayr United and Finland with Inter Turku.

== Career statistics ==
Appearances and goals by club, season and competition
Club	Season	League			FA Cup		League Cup		Other		Total	
Club	Season	Division	Apps	Goals	Apps	Goals	Apps	Goals	Apps	Goals	Apps	Goals
Norwich City	1982–83	First Division	1	0	0	0	1	0	1 (Note: Appearances in Football League Group Cup)	0	3	0
Norwich City	1983–84	First Division	25	4	1	0	6	0	0	0	32	4
Norwich City	1984–85	First Division	34	7	2	1	8	3	0	0	44	11
Norwich City	1985–86	Second Division	2	0	0	0	0	0	0	0	2	0
Norwich City	Total		62	11	3	1	15	3	1	0	81	15
Stoke City (loan)	1985–86	Second Division	4	1	1	0	0	0	0	0	5	1
Deportivo La Coruña	1985–86	Segunda División	11	2	0	0	0	0	0	0	11	2
Deportivo La Coruña	1986–87	Segunda División	36	9	0	0	0	0	0	0	36	9
Deportivo La Coruña	1987–88	Segunda División	31	9	0	0	0	0	0	0	31	9
Deportivo La Coruña	1988–89	Segunda División	9	0	0	0	0	0	0	0	9	0
Deportivo La Coruña	Total		87	20	0	0	0	0	0	0	87	20
Willem II	1988–89	Eredivisie	13	4	0	0	0	0	0	0	13	4
Ipswich Town	1989–90	Second Division	23	1	2	0	2	0	3 (Note: Appearances in Full Members' Cup)	1	30	2
Bristol City	1990–91	Second Division	24	3	1	0	1	0	0	0	26	3
Birmingham City	1991–92	Third Division	26	2	1	0	5	0	0	0	32	2
Birmingham City	1992–93	First Division	21	2	0	0	2	0	4 (Note: Appearances in Anglo-Italian Cup)	0	27	2
Birmingham City	1993–94	First Division	21	5	1	0	4	0	1	0	27	5
Birmingham City	1994–95	Second Division	31	9	5	0	3	0	6 (Note: Appearances in Football League Trophy)	1	45	10
Birmingham City	1995–96	First Division	13	0	1	0	8	0	2	1	24	1
Birmingham City	1996–97	First Division	4	0	0	0	1	0	0	0	5	0
Birmingham City	Total		116	18	8	0	23	0	13	2	160	20
Burnley (loan)	1992–93	Second Division	4	0	0	0	0	0	2	0	6	0
Shrewsbury Town (loan)	1993–94	Third Division	4	0	0	0	0	0	0	0	4	0
Walsall (loan)	1996–97	Second Division	6	1	0	0	0	0	0	0	6	1
Peterborough United	1996–97	Second Division	22	1	0	0	0	0	5	0	27	1
Walsall	1997–98	Second Division	6	0	0	1	0	0	0	0	7	0
Career total			371	60	15	2	41	3	24	3	451	68

== Honours ==
Norwich City Youth

- FA Youth Cup: 1983

Norwich City

- Football League Cup: 1984–85

Birmingham City

- Football League Second Division: 1994–95
- Football League Trophy: 1994–95
