= Capaldi =

Capaldi (variant Capaldo) is an Italian surname. The name is of Southern Italian origin. It may mean stubborn or headstrong, derived from caput "head". The Capaldo family originates in Bisaccia, Irpinia, Campania. Capaldi may be a patronymic or pluralisation derived from Capaldo.

Notable people with the surname include:

Capaldi

- Francesca Capaldi (born 2004), American actress
- Gianni Capaldi, Scottish actor and film and television producer
- Jim Capaldi (1944–2005), English rock musician, co-founder of the band Traffic
- John Capaldi (born 1959), Scottish former footballer
- Lewis Capaldi (born 1996), Scottish singer
- Peter Capaldi (born 1958), Scottish actor, writer and director
- Tony Capaldi (born 1981), Norwegian-Northern Irish footballer

Capaldo

- Franco Capaldo (1901–1978), Neapolitan singer
- Giuseppe Capaldo (1874–1919), Neapolitan poet
- Luigi Capaldo (1855–1947), Italian politician
- Nicolás Capaldo (b. 1997), Argentine footballer
- Pellegrino Capaldo (b. 1939), Italian politician
- Pietro Capaldo (1845–1925), Italian politician
