= Graham Potter =

English footballer and manager (born 1975)

- Potter in 2026

Personal information
- Full name: Graham Stephen Potter
- Date of birth: 20 May 1975 (age 51)
- Place of birth: Solihull, England
- Height: 6 ft 1 in (1.85 m)
- Position: Left-back

Team information
- Current team: Sweden (head coach)

Senior career*
Years	Team	Apps	(Gls)
1992–1993	Birmingham City	25	(2)
1993	→ Wycombe Wanderers (loan)	3	(0)
1993–1996	Stoke City	45	(1)
1996–1997	Southampton	8	(0)
1997–2000	West Bromwich Albion	43	(0)
1997	→ Northampton Town (loan)	3	(0)
1997–1998	→ Northampton Town (loan)	1	(0)
1999	→ Reading (loan)	4	(0)
2000–2003	York City	114	(5)
2003–2004	Boston United	12	(0)
2003	→ Shrewsbury Town (loan)	5	(0)
2004–2005	Macclesfield Town	57	(8)
Total		320	(16)

International career
1996	England U21	1	(0)

Managerial career
- 2008–2011: Leeds Carnegie
- 2011–2018: Östersund
- 2018–2019: Swansea City
- 2019–2022: Brighton & Hove Albion
- 2022–2023: Chelsea
- 2025: West Ham United
- 2025–: Sweden
- * Club domestic league appearances and goals

Graham Stephen Potter (born 20 May 1975) is an English professional football manager and former player who is the head coach of the Sweden national team.

In a 13-year playing career, Potter, who played as a left-back, made 307 appearances in the Football League. He also played in the Premier League for Southampton, and the Football Conference for Shrewsbury Town. At international level, he was capped once for England at under-21 level.

Potter started his professional managerial career in January 2011 with Swedish club Östersund. He won three promotions and the Svenska Cupen with Östersund, leading them to the 2017–18 UEFA Europa League knockout stage. He was appointed manager of Championship club Swansea City in June 2018, and moved on to Brighton & Hove Albion of the Premier League a year later. After a successful spell at Brighton, he was hired by Chelsea in 2022, but was dismissed in April 2023, following a steep drop in form. From January to September 2025, Potter managed West Ham United.

In October 2025, Potter took over as manager of Sweden, winning the UEFA play-offs to take the team to the 2026 FIFA World Cup.

== Playing career ==
Born in Solihull, West Midlands, Potter began his footballing career at the age of 17 as a trainee at Birmingham City. After a loan spell at Wycombe Wanderers, the young left-back then moved on to Stoke City, then to Southampton in the Premier League, where he played in the famous 6–3 win over Manchester United in 1996. While a Southampton player, he was capped for England U21s in a European Championships qualifier against Moldova.

Potter joined West Bromwich Albion in 1997, and after three and a half years, which also included loan spells at Northampton Town and Reading, he signed for York City. Potter moved from York City to Boston United in the summer of 2003. Potter would go on to make over 100 appearances for York City, before joining Shrewsbury Town on loan in November 2003. In the closing chapter of his playing career, in 2004, he moved on a free transfer to Macclesfield Town, where he finished his senior playing career.

== Coaching and managerial career ==
=== Early career ===
With support from the Professional Footballers' Association, Potter graduated from the Open University in December 2005 with a degree in Social Sciences. He worked as a football development manager for the University of Hull and as technical director for the Ghana women's team at the 2007 FIFA Women's World Cup. He became assistant coach for the England Universities squad, before joining Leeds Metropolitan University (now Leeds Beckett University) in a similar role; while at Leeds, he completed an MSc Leadership: Personal & Professional Development, which focused on using emotional intelligence.

=== Leeds Carnegie ===
In 2008, Potter was appointed manager of Northern Counties East League Division One side Leeds Carnegie. During his time at the club, Potter led the team to the third round of the FA Vase and third place in the 2009–10 Northern Counties East League season, before departing Leeds Carnegie on 12 January 2011.

=== Östersund ===
"Quite often there's no perfect situation that emerges. My situation, and my opportunity, was the fourth tier in Swedish football and a place that nobody really wanted to go to."

— Potter, speaking in September 2022, on his decision to join Östersund.

In December 2010, Potter signed a three-year contract as coach of Östersund, who were then playing in the fourth tier of Swedish football, starting on 24 January 2011. Potter was offered the job after Graeme Jones, his friend and assistant to Roberto Martínez at Swansea City, recommended him to chairman Daniel Kindberg after Östersund's pre-season friendly with Swansea.

In 2013, after two successive promotions, Potter extended his contract with the club for another three years. On 27 October 2015, Östersund secured promotion to the Swedish top flight, Allsvenskan, for the first time in their history following a second-place finish in the 2015 Superettan. Östersund finished their debut season in eighth place, winning plaudits for their "slick passing game" and competing on a limited budget.

On 13 April 2017, Potter's Östersund team won the Svenska Cupen, beating Norrköping 4–1 in the final. This granted the team a place in the second qualifying round of the 2017–18 UEFA Europa League where they defeated Galatasaray 3–1 on aggregate. In the third round they defeated Fola Esch 3–1 on aggregate and in the play-offs they knocked out PAOK (3–3 on aggregate with more away goals), thus securing a historic entry into the Europa League group stage. They finished second in their group, level on points with Athletic Bilbao. Despite beating Arsenal 2–1 at the Emirates Stadium, they were eliminated from the competition after losing 4–2 on aggregate. Östersund finished their domestic league season in fifth place.

=== Swansea City ===
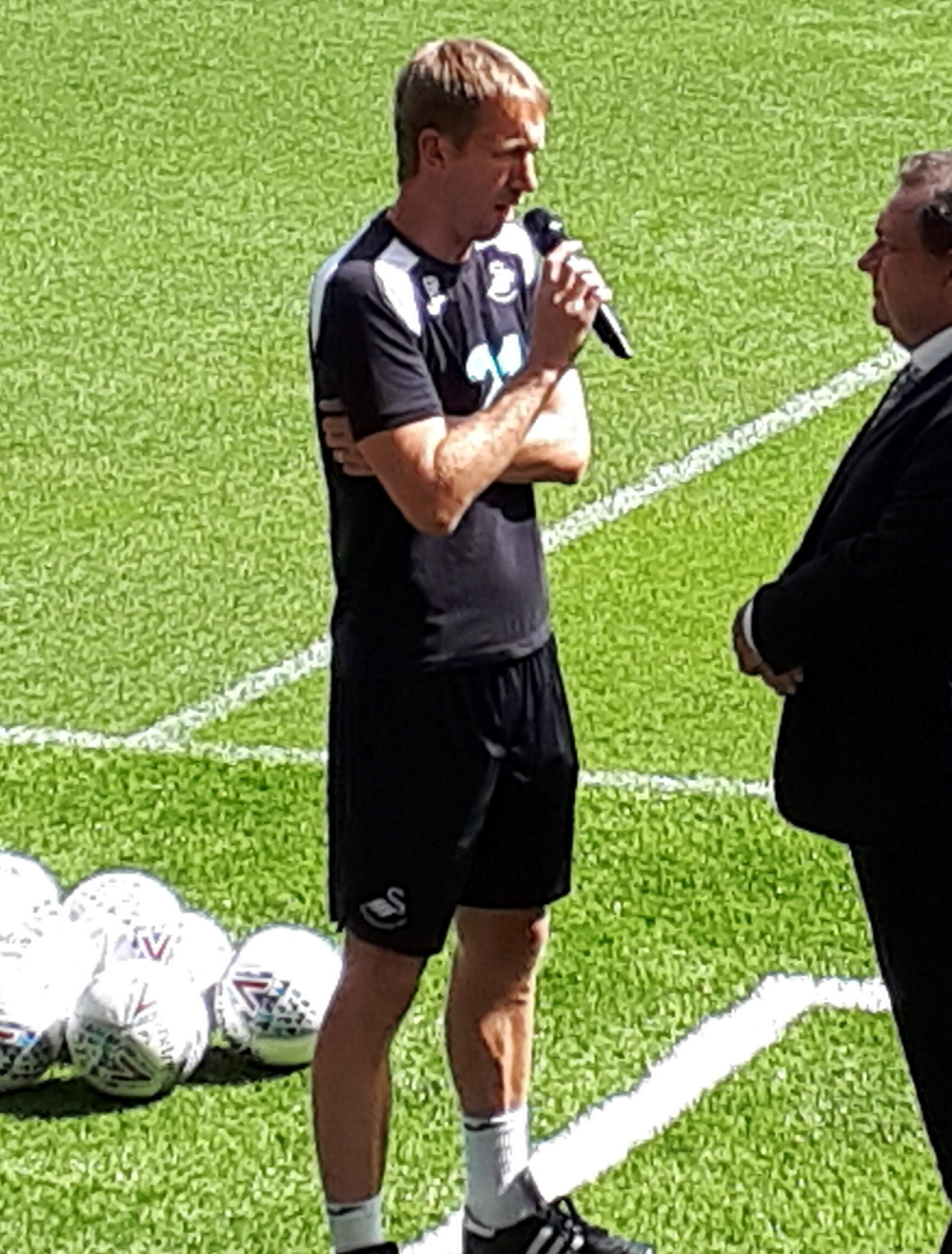
Potter as manager of Swansea City in 2018

Potter was appointed manager of newly relegated Championship club Swansea City on 11 June 2018 on a three-year contract. He was joined by assistant manager Billy Reid and recruitment analyst Kyle Macaulay. On his appointment, Potter said "This is a Premier League club from the last seven years and it wants to try to get back, but get back in a way that there is an identity and an understanding of what they want to be on the pitch. That was the interesting thing for me – the chance to build something".

Potter won his first match as Swansea boss with a 2–1 victory over Sheffield United, with goals from striker Oli McBurnie and former Liverpool youngster Yan Dhanda. His first game at Swansea's Liberty Stadium was a 1–0 win against Preston North End. In his first season at the club, Swansea reached the quarter-finals of the 2018–19 FA Cup, where they hosted Manchester City. They led the Premier League champions 2–0 after 30 minutes, but three goals in the last 20 minutes, one from Bernardo Silva, an own goal from Kristoffer Nordfeldt and a late winner from Sergio Agüero defeated Potter's side. They finished 10th in the league, after a strong end-of-season run gave Swansea a slim chance of making the play-offs going into the last three matches of the season.

After Chris Hughton was dismissed as Brighton & Hove Albion manager at the end of the 2018–19 season, Brighton made an approach for Potter to become their new manager, which Swansea initially rejected. Swansea offered Potter a new contract to remain at the club, which would have made him one of the Championship's highest earning managers. The club however, eventually granted permission for Potter to begin talks with Brighton, who would reportedly pay Swansea about £3m in compensation for Potter and his backroom staff.

=== Brighton & Hove Albion ===
Potter was appointed head coach of Premier League club Brighton & Hove Albion on 20 May 2019, signing a four-year contract. He won his first match 3–0 away to Watford, in what was also his Premier League debut. His first home game on 17 August was a 1–1 draw with West Ham United. Potter's first defeat in the league was a week later at Falmer Stadium, 2–0 to south coast neighbours Southampton.

In the first game back after the COVID-19 league suspension, Brighton achieved their first league double over Arsenal following a 2–1 home victory on 20 June, having also won 2–1 in the reverse fixture earlier in the season. His first season saw the club recording their highest points and goals in the Premier League, collecting 41 points and scoring 39, while finishing in 15th (their joint highest finish with the 2017–18 season) after a 2–1 win over Burnley in the last game of the season.

Brighton lost 3–1 at home to Chelsea in their opening game of the 2020–21 season. They won their first league match of the season in their second game, beating Newcastle away 3–0. Brighton lost 3–2 at home to Manchester United on 26 September; this was Potter's 100th defeat as a manager.

On 31 January 2021, Brighton beat Tottenham 1–0, their first league win at home since the victory over Arsenal on 20 June 2020. Three days later, Potter led Brighton to beat defending champions Liverpool 1–0 at Anfield, Brighton's first league win at Liverpool since 1982. On 18 May, Brighton came from 2–0 down to defeat champions Manchester City 3–2, their first league victory over City since 1989.

Potter's second year in charge of Brighton finished with a record-equalling points tally of 41 points, which they also achieved the season before. However, they finished in 16th, a place below the previous season. Brighton scored 40 goals in the Premier League, conceding 46, with a minus six goal difference and keeping 12 clean sheets, all being new club record statistics for Brighton in the Premier League.

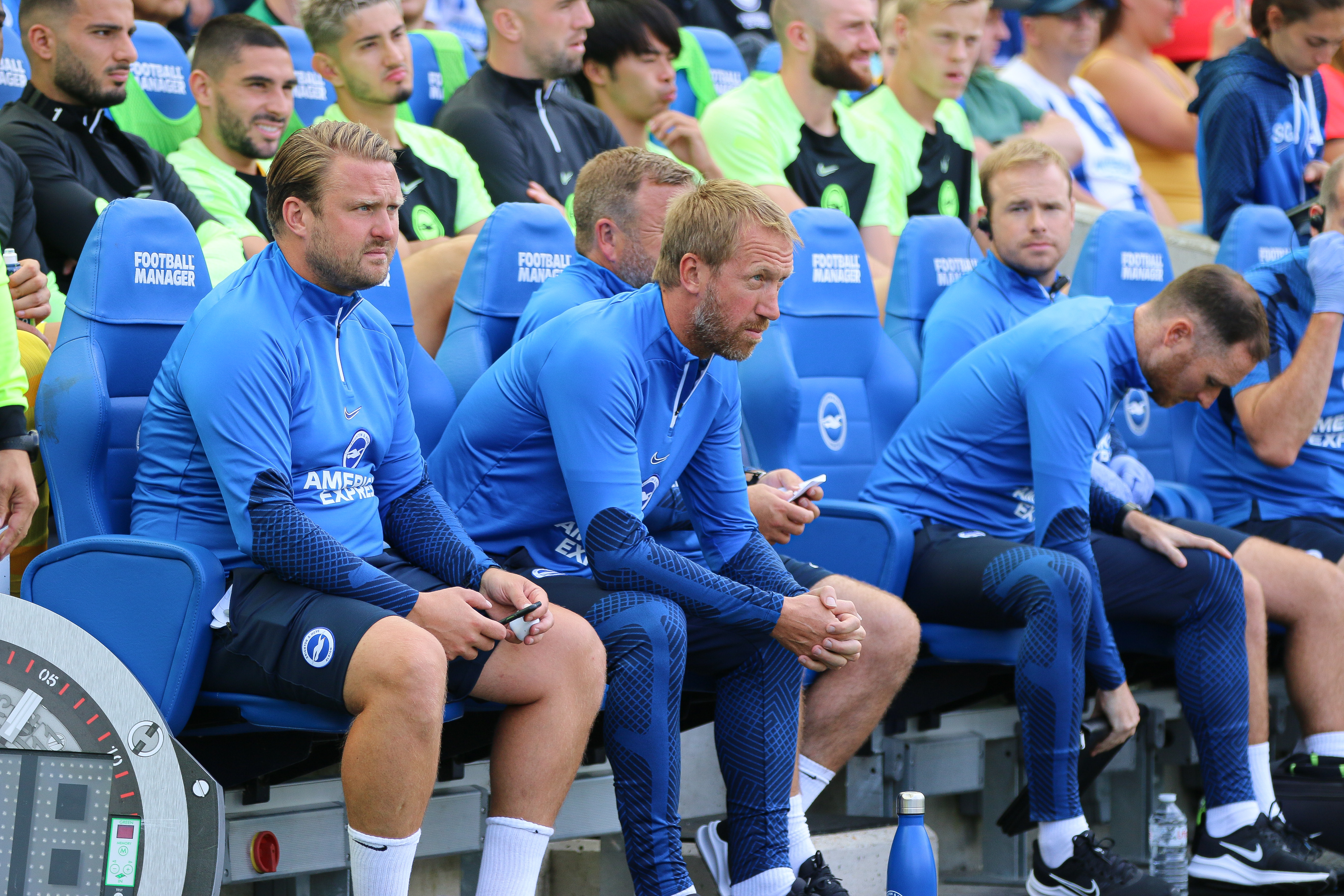
Potter (centre) as manager of Brighton & Hove Albion in 2022

In Potter's third season, Brighton came from behind to beat Burnley 2–1 at Turf Moor in the opening game of the season on 14 August. Potter's 100th game as Brighton manager – and 400th overall – came on 20 November, a 2–0 away defeat at Aston Villa. On 21 January 2022, it was announced that Potter had tested positive for COVID-19; first team coach Björn Hamberg instead took charge of Brighton's game against Leicester City, a 1–1 away draw.

Potter's 100th Premier League match came on 15 February, a 2–0 away loss at Manchester United, ending Brighton's record-breaking unbeaten league run of seven games. He guided Brighton to their best ever points tally after a 3–0 away victory over Wolverhampton Wanderers on 30 April, with Brighton up to 44 points and sitting ninth in the league. A week later, Potter's Brighton beat Manchester United at the Amex 4–0; the victory became Brighton's biggest top flight result.

Brighton achieved their highest top flight finish after beating West Ham United 3–1 on the last game of the season, ending the campaign in ninth place with their highest Premier League goal tally of 42 and reaching 51 points, 10 points higher than their previous record of 41.

Potter became the first Brighton manager to win at Old Trafford, after Brighton beat Manchester United 2–1 in the opening game of the 2022–23 season. On 4 September, Brighton beat Leicester City 5–2 at Falmer Stadium, the first time Brighton have scored five goals in a Premier League fixture.

On 8 September 2022, Brighton announced that Potter and five members of his backroom staff would depart the club for Chelsea. Chelsea reportedly paid Brighton around £16m for Potter and an additional £5.5m to £6.5m in compensation for his backroom staff. He was succeeded at Brighton by Roberto De Zerbi.

=== Chelsea ===
I want a tactically flexible, attacking, possession-based team. Players that are brave, that aren't afraid to make mistakes. That can get on the ball and show courage and really try to enjoy their football. If the players are enjoying their football, there's a chance that the supporters will enjoy it as well. That's how you grow and develop as a club. Styles of play don't make you win games. The challenge is having players believe in it and how it works.

— Potter, on the philosophy he sought to establish at Chelsea.

On 8 September 2022, Potter was appointed the new head coach of Premier League club Chelsea on a five-year deal, replacing Thomas Tuchel. On his debut six days later, the team drew 1–1 at home to Red Bull Salzburg in the Champions League group stage. On 1 October, Potter won his first Chelsea match in his second game in charge, coming from behind to beat Crystal Palace 2–1 away from home. Pierre-Emerick Aubameyang and Chelsea graduate Conor Gallagher – who scored the 90th minute winner – scored their first goals for the club. His first loss came on 29 October in his 10th game, a heavy 4–1 away defeat on his first return to his previous club Brighton.

After Chelsea's exit in the third round of the FA Cup for the first time since 1998 following a 4–0 defeat to Manchester City, Potter came under intense scrutiny from the fans and media due to the side's poor results and performances. On 18 February 2023, after a home defeat to bottom of the table Southampton, a section of Chelsea fans called for Potter's resignation. According to Sky Sports, Chelsea co-owner Todd Boehly, who hired Potter, was among the few board members backing him. On 7 March, Chelsea reached the quarter-finals of the Champions League, overturning a first-leg round of 16 defeat at Borussia Dortmund by beating them 2–0 at home.

On 2 April, following a 2–0 loss to Aston Villa at Stamford Bridge, Potter was dismissed from his post, with Bruno Saltor taking over as interim. During the January 2023 transfer window, Potter oversaw a £323 million outlay on new players. He managed 31 games, losing 11, and left Chelsea in 11th place in the Premier League at the time of his dismissal.

=== West Ham United ===
Potter was appointed head coach of Premier League club West Ham United on 9 January 2025, signing a two-and-a-half year contract. He replaced Julen Lopetegui who had been dismissed the previous day. The following day, in his first game in charge, West Ham were defeated 2–1 by Aston Villa in the 3rd round of the FA Cup. On 14 January, Potter won his first West Ham match in his second game in charge, beating Fulham 3–2 at home. West Ham managed one win in Potter's first six games in charge and went eight games without a win before rallying towards the end of the 2024–25 season to finish 14th in the 2024–25 Premier League table.

On 27 September 2025, Potter was dismissed by West Ham United following poor results and performances over the course of the second half of the 2024–25 season and the start of the 2025–26 season. At the time, West Ham were 19th in the league having won one of their opening five league games.

=== Sweden ===
On 20 October 2025, the Swedish Football Association announced the appointment of Potter as the new head coach of the Sweden national football team. He was appointed on a short-term contract with the aim of managing Sweden to qualify for the 2026 World Cup. His first game in charge, on 15 November, resulted in a 4–1 defeat to Switzerland in a 2026 World Cup qualifying game. On 12 March 2026, Potter's contract was extended to 2030. On 26 March 2026, Potter achieved his first win as Sweden manager in a 2026 FIFA World Cup play-off as they defeated Ukraine 3–1, with Viktor Gyökeres scoring a hat-trick. They then defeated Poland 3–2 in the play-off final, securing qualification for the 2026 FIFA World Cup.

== Managerial style ==
=== Tactics ===
He's English, he's a modern coach, he has new ideas, he brings new ideas. [Swansea is] a team that takes care of how they move the ball... in their style, the goalkeeper and defenders build from the back. And for me it's the feature that you could underline from Swansea [under Potter].

— Argentinian coach Marcelo Bielsa on facing Potter's Swansea City team, 20 August 2018.

Potter has been recognised for his "progressive" and "unconventional" coaching methods. At Östersund, he encouraged his players and staff to engage in community activities, such as performing in theatre and music productions designed to take them out of their comfort zone.

Potter describes his teams as "tactically flexible, attacking, [and] possession-based". At Östersund, he deployed a flexible 3–5–2, 4–4–2, 4–3–3 formation centered on ball possession. At Swansea, Potter used ten different formations and his team completed the most passes per 90 minutes in the Championship.

As a young coach, Potter studied the training methods of Roberto Martínez at Swansea and became inspired by his possession-based approach, along with the "holistic" training principles he observed during his travels to Spain. Potter also cites the philosophy of Pep Guardiola and Raymond Verheijen's periodisation model among his influences.

=== Reception ===
Former Celtic and Barcelona player Henrik Larsson commented on Potter's pattern of play, stating he "played all different kinds of systems, starting off a match one way, and then halfway through they started playing a different system, and then they ended up with a third system. And all the players knew exactly what they were doing." Guardiola admitted that he was a "big fan" of Potter, saying that Potter's "Brighton are a joy to watch, a joy to analyse" and that his "players move with freedom and everyone knows what they have to do. They have the courage to play everywhere."

In October 2021, BBC Sport published a feature on Potter's rise and regarded him as a possible England manager in the making.

In September 2025, before he was dismissed by West Ham, Potter became the subject of viral face swap memes on social media, portraying him as various celebrities. The trend began from frustrated West Ham fans ridiculing Potter over the team's results, whilst Potter himself responded by saying that the memes "made his son laugh".

== Personal life ==
Potter is married to Rachel Potter. They have three sons.

== Career statistics ==
Appearances and goals by club, season and competition
Club	Season	League			FA Cup		League Cup		Other		Total	
Club	Season	Division	Apps	Goals	Apps	Goals	Apps	Goals	Apps	Goals	Apps	Goals
Birmingham City	1992–93	First Division	18	2	1	0	0	0	4 (Note: Appearances in Anglo-Italian Cup)	0	23	2
Birmingham City	1993–94	First Division	7	0	0	0	0	0	2	0	9	0
Birmingham City	Total		25	2	1	0	0	0	6	0	32	2
Wycombe Wanderers (loan)	1993–94	Third Division	3	0	0	0	1	0	1 (Note: Appearances in Football League Trophy)	0	5	0
Stoke City	1993–94	First Division	3	0	2	0	0	0	0	0	5	0
Stoke City	1994–95	First Division	1	0	0	0	1	0	0	0	2	0
Stoke City	1995–96	First Division	41	1	2	0	3	0	5	0	51	1
Stoke City	Total		45	1	2	0	4	0	5	0	58	1
Southampton	1996–97	Premier League	8	0	0	0	2	0	—		10	0
West Bromwich Albion	1996–97	First Division	6	0	0	0	0	0	—		6	0
West Bromwich Albion	1997–98	First Division	5	0	0	0	0	0	—		5	0
West Bromwich Albion	1998–99	First Division	22	0	1	0	1	0	—		24	0
West Bromwich Albion	1999–2000	First Division	10	0	0	0	2	0	—		12	0
West Bromwich Albion	Total		43	0	1	0	3	0	0	0	47	0
Northampton Town (loan)	1997–98	Second Division	4	0	0	0	0	0	1	0	5	0
Reading (loan)	1999–2000	Second Division	4	0	0	0	0	0	1	0	5	0
York City	2000–01	Third Division	38	2	4	1	2	0	0	0	44	3
York City	2001–02	Third Division	37	2	6	2	1	0	0	0	44	4
York City	2002–03	Third Division	39	1	2	0	1	0	1	0	43	1
York City	Total		114	5	12	3	4	0	1	0	131	8
Boston United	2003–04	Third Division	12	0	1	0	1	0	1	0	15	0
Shrewsbury Town (loan)	2003–04	Football Conference	5	0	—		—		—		5	0
Macclesfield Town	2003–04	Third Division	16	2	0	0	0	0	0	0	16	2
Macclesfield Town	2004–05	League Two	41	6	3	0	1	0	3	0	48	6
Macclesfield Town	Total		57	8	3	0	1	0	3	0	64	8
Career total			320	16	22	3	16	0	19	0	377	19

== Managerial statistics ==
As of match played 17 November 2026

Managerial record by team and tenure
Team	Nat.	From	To	Record					Ref.
Team	Nat.	From	To	G	W	D	L	Win %	Ref.
Östersund	(Sweden)	24 January 2011	11 June 2018	249	127	60	62	51.00	
Swansea City	(Wales)	11 June 2018	20 May 2019	51	21	11	19	41.18	
Brighton & Hove Albion	(England)	20 May 2019	8 September 2022	135	42	46	47	31.11	
Chelsea	(England)	8 September 2022	2 April 2023	31	12	8	11	38.71	
West Ham United	(England)	9 January 2025	27 September 2025	25	6	5	14	24.00	
Sweden	(Sweden)	20 October 2025	Present	16	7	5	4	43.75	
Career Total				507	215	135	157	42.41	

== Honours ==
=== Manager ===
Östersund

- Svenska Cupen: 2016–17
- Superettan runner-up: 2015
- Division 1 Norra: 2012
- Division 2 Norrland: 2011

Individual

- Swedish Football Awards Manager of the Year: 2016, 2017
- Swedish Sports Awards Coach of the Year: 2017
