= Peter Frain =

English footballer and manager

Personal information
- Full name: Peter John Andrew Frain
- Date of birth: 18 March 1965 (age 61)
- Place of birth: Birmingham, England
- Position: Striker

Senior career*
Years	Team	Apps	(Gls)
	West Bromwich Albion	0	(0)
1983–1984	→ Mansfield Town (loan)	2	(0)
1987	NSÍ (Faroe Islands)	13	(7)

International career
1982	England U17	3	(0)
	England U18	4	

Managerial career
- Knowle
- 2004–2005: Alvechurch
- 2006–2008: Highgate United
- 2008–2009: Highgate United
- 2010: Bolehall Swifts
- * Club domestic league appearances and goals

Peter John Andrew Frain (born 18 March 1965) is an English former professional footballer who played as a striker in the Football League for Mansfield Town. After retiring as a player he took up management, most recently as manager of Midland Football Combination Premier Division side Bolehall Swifts.

== Playing career ==
Frain spent five years with West Bromwich Albion, during which time he played four times for the England under-18 team. He played twice in the Third Division of the Football League while on loan to Mansfield Town, but never appeared for his owning club. He went on to play in the Faroe Islands and in English non-League football.

== Management career ==
After retiring as a player Frain became a manager, first with Knowle, and then in joint charge of Alvechurch alongside Paul Busst until the pair left the club in September 2009. The next month Frain was appointed manager of Midland Football Combination Premier Division club Highgate United. In his second season with the club they finished third, going one place better in 2007–08 and earning promotion to the Midland Football Alliance. Frain left the club in late 2008 for work-related reasons, but returned only two weeks later. After a mid-table finish preceded a poor start to the 2009–10 season, Frain was sacked in September 2009. In January 2010, Frain returned to the Midland Combination as manager of Premier Division side Bolehall Swifts. After helping the club to an 18th-place finish in the Midland Football Combination Premier Division, Frain was replaced as manager in July 2010.

== Personal life ==
In 2008, Frain was working as a logistics manager. He is the brother of former Birmingham City and Northampton Town footballer John Frain.
