= Simon Black (English footballer) =

English footballer

Personal information
- Full name: Simon Anthony Black
- Date of birth: 9 November 1975 (age 50)
- Place of birth: Marston Green, Solihull, England
- Position: Forward

Youth career
- 1991–1993: Birmingham City

Senior career*
Years	Team	Apps	(Gls)
1993–199x	Birmingham City	2	(0)
–	Doncaster Rovers	0	(0)
1995	Yeovil Town	13	(4)
1996	Ilkeston Town	1	
1996	Gloucester City	7	(3)
1998	Brierley Hill Town		
1998–199?	Halesowen Town		
199?–2000	Bedworth United		
2000–2001	Stourbridge		
2002–200?	Paget Rangers		
- Bridlington Town
- Hall Road Rangers
- * Club domestic league appearances and goals

Simon Anthony Black (born 9 November 1975) is an English former professional footballer who played as a forward in the Football League for Birmingham City.

Black was born in Marston Green, Solihull. When he left school in 1991, he joined Birmingham City as a YTS trainee, and made his debut in Division One (second tier) on the opening day of the 1993–94 season in a 1–0 defeat at Charlton Athletic. He played once more in the league and twice in the Anglo-Italian Cup, before leaving the club. He was later on the books of Doncaster Rovers, without playing for the first team.

He joined Yeovil Town, making his debut for them on 4 March and going on to make 13 appearances during the remainder of the 1994–95 season and score four goals. He subsequently played one match for Ilkeston Town on 24 February 1996 before joining Gloucester City, where he scored three goals in seven appearances by the end of the 1995–96 season.

In early 1998 he signed for Brierley Hill Town, but joined Halesowen Town later in the year. He subsequently played for Bedworth United in 1999, Stourbridge from 2000 to 2001, Paget Rangers in 2002, Bridlington Town and Hall Road Rangers.
