= John Capaldi =

Scottish footballer

Personal information
- Date of birth: 16 November 1959 (age 66)
- Place of birth: Newarthill, Scotland
- Position: Striker

Senior career*
Years	Team	Apps	(Gls)
1975–1978	Aston Villa	0	(0)
1978–1980	Motherwell	11	(0)
1980–1983	Pors Grenland	63	(46)
- Bolehall Swifts

Managerial career
- 2002–2003: Bolehall Swifts
- * Club domestic league appearances and goals as of 22:00, 17 March 2013 (UTC)

John Capaldi (born 16 November 1959) is a Scottish former footballer who played for Aston Villa, Motherwell and Pors Grenland, and also had a spell managing Bolehall Swifts. During his career, he played as a striker.
