= Jae Martin =

English footballer

Personal information
- Full name: Jae Andrew Martin
- Date of birth: 5 February 1976 (age 50)
- Place of birth: Hampstead, England
- Height: 5 ft 9 in (1.75 m)
- Position: Forward

Youth career
- 1992–1994: Southend United

Senior career*
Years	Team	Apps	(Gls)
1993–1995	Southend United	8	(0)
1994	→ Leyton Orient (loan)	4	(0)
1995–1996	Birmingham City	7	(0)
1996	→ Lincoln City (loan)	13	(2)
1996–1998	Lincoln City	26	(3)
1998–2000	Peterborough United	18	(1)
1999	→ Grantham Town (loan)		
2000	→ Welling United (loan)		
2000–2001	Woking		
2000–2005	Moor Green		
2004–2005	→ Bromsgrove Rovers (loan)		
2005–2006	Evesham United		
2005–2006	Solihull Borough		
2005–2006	Barnt Green Spartak		
2005–2006	Stourport Swifts		
2006–2007	Bedworth United		
2007–2008	Stratford Town		
2007–2008	Woodford United		
2007–2008	Evesham United		
2007–2008	Atherstone Town		
2008–2009	Sutton Coldfield Town		
2008–2009	Coleshill Town		
2008–20??	Woodford United		
- Northfield Town
- * Club domestic league appearances and goals

Jae Andrew Martin (born 5 February 1976) is an English former professional footballer who played as a midfielder. He played in the Football League for Southend United, Leyton Orient, Birmingham City, Lincoln City and Peterborough United, before playing non-league football for a large number of clubs, mostly in the Midlands.

== Non-league career ==
Martin linked up with Barnt Green Spartak making a goalscoring debut in the 3–2 Midland Combination Premier Division clash with Feckenham on 29 October 2005.

In July 2007, Martin joined Stratford Town, making his final appearance for the club in a 2–1 defeat at Alvechurch on 3 November 2007 before moving on to Woodford United. Having scored with a penalty on his home debut for the club in a 3–0 Southern Football League Division One Midlands victory over Berkhamsted Town on 12 November 2007, he was quickly on the move again joining Evesham United and making his debut in a 4–2 Errea Cup home defeat to Gloucester City eight days later. It proved to be his only appearance in his second spell for the club and he moved on to Atherstone Town.

Martin began the season with Sutton Coldfield Town. He joined Coleshill Town, making his debut in the 2–0 Midland Football Alliance victory at Shifnal Town on 24 January 2009.
