= Neil Doherty (footballer) =

English footballer

Personal information
- Date of birth: 21 February 1969 (age 57)
- Place of birth: Barrow-in-Furness, England
- Position: Winger

Youth career
- Watford

Senior career*
Years	Team	Apps	(Gls)
1990–1994	Barrow		
1994–1996	Birmingham City	23	(2)
1996	→ Northampton Town (loan)	9	(1)
1996–1999	Kidderminster Harriers		
1998–1999	→ Barrow (loan)		
1999–2002	Barrow		
- * Club domestic league appearances and goals

Neil Doherty (born 21 February 1969) is an English former professional footballer. Doherty played as a winger. As well as having two spells at Barrow, his home-town club, Doherty played with Watford, Birmingham City, Northampton Town and Kidderminster Harriers.

Doherty began his career with Watford, though never played a professional game for the club. He signed for Barrow in 1990 under Ray Wilkie and became part of the FA Trophy winning squad. After Barrow were relegated from the Conference National in 1992, Doherty initially remained with the team. However, promotion was not forthcoming and he was sold to Birmingham for £40 000 in 1994, having made over 300 appearances for the club. He was with the Birmingham team for two seasons, winning Division Two and the Football League Trophy in 1995. During this period, however, Doherty was never a first choice player, and he left having made 23 league appearances for the club.

After a spell on loan to Northampton Town at the end of his time with Birmingham, Doherty joined Kidderminster Harriers of the Conference for the start of the 1996/97 season. Doherty's time with the club was initially successful, with his 14 goals earning him an England Semi-Professional cap in 1997. Doherty fell out of favour, however, and in 1998 played on loan with Barrow, who were briefly back in the Football Conference. He left Kidderminster at the end of the 1998/99 season, and moved to Barrow permanently in August 1999. He played his last few seasons with the club but had noticeable lost pace, and he retired at the end of the 2001/02 season, having made a total of 446 appearances for Barrow.

Since retiring, Doherty has coached at and represented Barrow within the local community. He now runs the InsideOut Soccer Schools for children in Barrow.

== Honours ==
With Barrow:

- FA Trophy - 1990

With Birmingham City

- Football League Division Two - 1994/95
- Football League Trophy - 1995
