= Darren Rogers =

English footballer (born 1970)

Personal information
- Full name: Darren John Rogers
- Date of birth: 9 April 1970 (age 56)
- Place of birth: Birmingham, England
- Position: Defender

Youth career
- 1986–1988: West Bromwich Albion

Senior career*
Years	Team	Apps	(Gls)
1988–1992	West Bromwich Albion	14	(1)
1992–1994	Birmingham City	18	(1)
1993	→ Kidderminster Harriers (loan)	1	(0)
1993	→ Wycombe Wanderers (loan)	1	(0)
1994–1997	Walsall	58	(0)
1997–199?	Stevenage Borough	12	(0)
2001–2002	Evesham United		
- * Club domestic league appearances and goals

Darren John Rogers (born 9 April 1970) is an English former professional footballer who played 91 games in the Football League representing West Bromwich Albion, Birmingham City, Wycombe Wanderers and Walsall. He also played in non-League football for Kidderminster Harriers, Stevenage Borough and Evesham United. He played as a defender.

== Career ==
Rogers was born in Birmingham. When he left school in 1986 he joined West Bromwich Albion as a YTS trainee, and signed professional forms two years later. Rogers played 14 Second Division games for the club before joining local rivals Birmingham City, newly promoted to that level, on a free transfer in July 1992. Described as "fast and mobile with a good, strong tackle", Rogers went straight into the starting eleven and played in the first 11 games of the 1992–93 season before dropping out of regular first-team football. Either side of an unsuccessful trial at Lincoln City, he had loan spells at Kidderminster Harriers of the Conference and Wycombe Wanderers of Division Three, for whom he made only one substitute appearance, before joining Walsall in July 1994. He played 26 games in all competitions for Birmingham.

Rogers contributed to Walsall's promotion to Division Two in his first season with the club, but a cruciate ligament injury restricted his league appearances to 58 in three-and-a-bit seasons. An October 1997 move to the Conference with Stevenage Borough ended in his early release after he suffered another injury soon after joining. He went on play for Evesham United.
