= Steve Barnes (footballer) =

English footballer

Personal information
- Full name: Steven Leslie Barnes
- Date of birth: 5 January 1976 (age 50)
- Place of birth: Harrow, England
- Height: 5 ft 4 in (1.63 m)
- Position: Winger

Senior career*
Years	Team	Apps	(Gls)
199x–1995	Welling United	58	(8)
1995–1998	Birmingham City	3	(0)
1998	→ Brighton & Hove Albion (loan)	12	(0)
1998–2000	Barnet	15	(0)
2000	→ Welling United (loan)	8	(2)
2000	Hayes	19	(1)
2000	St Albans City	3	(0)
2001	Harrow Borough		
2001	Welling United		
2001	Chesham United		
2001–2003	Welling United		
2009–2010	Maidenhead United	6	(0)
- * Club domestic league appearances and goals

Steven Leslie Barnes (born 5 January 1976) is an English former professional footballer who played in the Football League for Birmingham City, Brighton & Hove Albion and Barnet.

== Playing career ==
Barnes was born in the London Borough of Harrow. He began his football career with Welling United of the Conference National before Birmingham City paid £75,000 for his services in October 1995. He made his first-team debut as a substitute in a League Cup match against Middlesbrough in December 1995, and first played in the Football League on 4 February 1996, coming on to replace Jason Bowen in a Division One match away to Norwich City which finished as a 1–1 draw.

Barnes spent three months on loan to Brighton & Hove Albion of Division Three in 1998, starting 12 games, and in October 1998 joined Barnet, also of Division Three, on a free transfer. He played intermittently for Barnet in his first season, rarely in his second, and in March 2000 he rejoined his former club Welling United on loan, where he scored twice in eight appearances. His second goal, which secured a 1–0 defeat of Hednesford Town on the last day of the season, was not enough to prevent Welling's relegation from the Conference.

In the summer of 2000, Barnes joined Hayes, where he made 22 appearances in all competitions, and scored only once: the goal, either "a mis-hit shot or an intentional lob from 25 yards", won the game against Kettering Town which played a significant role in deciding which of the two were relegated. He went on to play for St Albans City, Harrow Borough, Welling United (two more spells) and Chesham United. In March 2009, having spent time out of the game, Barnes joined Maidenhead United of the Conference South.
