= Gary Breen =

Ireland international footballer (born 1973)

Personal information
- Date of birth: 12 December 1973 (age 52)
- Place of birth: Hendon, Greater London, England
- Height: 6 ft 2 in (1.88 m)
- Position: Centre back

Youth career
- Charlton Athletic

Senior career*
Years	Team	Apps	(Gls)
1990–1991	Charlton Athletic	0	(0)
1991–1992	Maidstone United	19	(0)
1992–1994	Gillingham	51	(0)
1994–1996	Peterborough United	69	(1)
1996–1997	Birmingham City	40	(2)
1997–2002	Coventry City	146	(2)
2002–2003	West Ham United	14	(0)
2003–2006	Sunderland	107	(7)
2006–2008	Wolverhampton Wanderers	59	(1)
2008–2010	Barnet	47	(0)
Total		552	(13)

International career
1992–1995	Republic of Ireland U21	9	(0)
1996–2006	Republic of Ireland	63	(7)
- * Club domestic league appearances and goals

Gary Breen (born 12 December 1973) is a former footballer who made more than 500 appearances in the Football League and Premier League. A centre back, Breen played for numerous clubs over a 20-year career, including more than 100 appearances each for Coventry City and Sunderland. Born in England, he won 63 caps for the Republic of Ireland. He played in the 2002 FIFA World Cup, scoring in Ireland's 3–0 victory over Saudi Arabia.

== Club career ==
Breen was born in Hendon, London, and began his professional career as a youth player at Charlton Athletic, but never made a first-team appearance for the club. Instead, he moved to Maidstone United where he played his first league game at age 17. After one full season with the club he joined Gillingham where he eventually became a first-team regular, prompting a £70,000 bid from Peterborough United.

He only had one full season at Peterborough United, but did well enough to draw attention from First Division Birmingham City, who paid £250,000 for him in February 1996. Less than 12 months after arriving at Birmingham, he was on the move again, to Premier League Coventry City in a £2.5 million deal. He played for five full seasons at Highfield Road, four in the top flight.

Following the 2002 World Cup, Breen was signed on a free transfer by West Ham United by manager Glenn Roeder, but left the club after relegation from the top flight and only 18 appearances in all competitions. He was signed on a free transfer by his old Ireland manager Mick McCarthy for Sunderland.

Breen was subsequently signed by Wolverhampton Wanderers in a two-year deal, reuniting him again with McCarthy. He played almost all the club's games as they reached the play-offs in his first season at Molineux, scoring once, against Luton Town.

He was made Wolves' club captain for the 2007–08 season, but ended up missing several months through injury. He was involved in an after-match confrontation with his manager in March 2008.

In December 2008, he joined Barnet as a player-coach. In July 2009 Breen signed a new contract to become player/assistant manager at the club.

On the Goals on Sunday programme on 6 September 2009, Breen revealed that he had agreed to move to Inter Milan after the 2002 World Cup, but failed a medical. Breen had also been linked with a move to Barcelona. Breen left Barnet in June 2010.

Breen was appointed first-team coach of Peterborough United in June 2013.

== International career ==
Breen's form at Birmingham won him a call-up to the Republic of Ireland national team. On 29 May 1996, he made his debut when he replaced Alan Kernaghan in the 88th minute of the 1–0 friendly defeat against Portugal at Lansdowne Road. Three days later, Breen made his first start in the 2–2 friendly draw with Croatia, he played 74 minutes before being replaced by Tony Cascarino. He scored his first goal for his country two days later, he opened the scoring in the 3–1 defeat to the Netherlands at De Kuip in Rotterdam.

Breen's form at Coventry cemented his place in his national side and he played at the 2002 FIFA World Cup as Ireland made the second round under Mick McCarthy. He scored in Ireland's 3–0 group win against Saudi Arabia.

== Honours ==
Sunderland

- Football League Championship: 2004–05

Individual

- PFA Team of the Year: 2004–05 Football League Championship

== See also ==
- List of Republic of Ireland international footballers born outside the Republic of Ireland
