= Andy Saville =

English footballer

Personal information
- Full name: Andrew Victor Saville
- Date of birth: 12 December 1964 (age 61)
- Place of birth: Hull, England
- Height: 6 ft 0 in (1.83 m)
- Position: Striker

Youth career
- 1979–1983: Hull City

Senior career*
Years	Team	Apps	(Gls)
1983–1989	Hull City	101	(18)
1989–1990	Walsall	38	(5)
1990–1992	Barnsley	82	(21)
1992–1993	Hartlepool United	37	(14)
1993–1995	Birmingham City	59	(17)
1994–1995	→ Burnley (loan)	4	(1)
1995–1996	Preston North End	56	(30)
1996–1997	Wigan Athletic	25	(4)
1997–1999	Cardiff City	35	(12)
1998	→ Hull City (loan)	3	(0)
1999	Scarborough	9	(0)
1999–2000	Gainsborough Trinity		
2000–2001	Goole		
Total		449	(132)
- * Club domestic league appearances and goals

Andrew Victor Saville (born 12 December 1964) is an English former professional footballer who played as a striker. His professional career lasted sixteen years, spent at a total of ten lower-division clubs in the Football League.

== Career ==
Saville was born in Hull. He made more than 100 appearances for his home-town club, Hull City, whom he joined from school. He was his club's leading scorer on several occasions, at Hull City in 1986–87, at Birmingham City in 1993–94, and again in 1995–96 for Preston North End, where he scored 30 goals in all competitions, his 29 League goals making him overall top scorer in the Third Division.

In 1992–93 he had the rare distinction of becoming top scorer for two clubs in the same season, scoring 20 goals in all competitions for Hartlepool United before moving to Birmingham in March 1993, where his ten games produced seven goals, a total which no other Birmingham player bettered over the whole season.

== Personal life ==
Saville works as a host for the hospitality boxes at Hull City.

== Honours ==
Preston North End

- Football League Third Division: 1995–96

Wigan Athletic

- Football League Third Division: 1996–97

Individual

- PFA Team of the Year: 1995–96 Third Division
- Football League Third Division Golden Boot: 1995–96
