= John Frain =

English footballer (born 1968)

Personal information
- Full name: John William Frain
- Date of birth: 8 October 1968 (age 58)
- Place of birth: Birmingham, England
- Height: 5 ft 9 in (1.75 m)
- Positions: Midfielder; left back

Youth career
- 1984–1986: Birmingham City

Senior career*
Years	Team	Apps	(Gls)
1986–1997	Birmingham City	274	(25)
1997	→ Northampton Town (loan)	14	(1)
1997–2003	Northampton Town	205	(4)
2003–2005	Moor Green		

Managerial career
- 2003–2007: Moor Green (assistant manager)
- 2007–2008: Solihull Moors (assistant manager)
- * Club domestic league appearances and goals

John William Frain (born 8 October 1968) is an English former professional footballer who played for Birmingham City and Northampton Town. He played in all four divisions of the Football League, making nearly 500 league appearances for his two clubs.

== Life and career ==
Frain was born in Yardley, Birmingham. He joined Birmingham City from school, made his debut in the First Division in April 1986 aged 17, and signed full professional forms in October of that year. He was originally a left back, but good passing ability and a lack of pace saw him moved into midfield, towards the end of his Birmingham career returning to left-back. He was the club's free kick and penalty specialist. He was part of the team that won the Associate Members' Cup in 1990-91 and gained promotion from the Third Division in 1991–92. He was the club's Player of the Year for 1994. He also appeared in the club's 1994–95 Third Division championship-winning season and in the early rounds of that year's Football League Trophy. In 1996, he was awarded a testimonial match against Aston Villa in recognition of ten years' service. He made 336 appearances for the club in all competitions, scoring 28 goals.

In January 1997 Frain joined Northampton Town on loan, writing himself into the club's history by scoring a stoppage-time winner from a free kick in that season's Third Division play-off final. His free-transfer move to the club was made permanent at the end of that season. He later played his part in the club winning automatic promotion back to the Second Division in 1999–2000. He made 248 appearances for the club in all competitions, scoring 8 goals.

In July 2003 Frain was appointed player/assistant manager of Moor Green. In his first season, he helped the club reach the final of the Southern League Cup and win the Birmingham Senior Cup, beating Wolverhampton Wanderers in the final. Frain retired as a player at the end of the 2004–05 season due to a persistent knee injury, but retained his assistant manager's post following the merger of Moor Green and Solihull Borough to form Solihull Moors, until he resigned in August 2008.

Frain combined his football duties with working as a mortgage underwriter. His brother Peter played as a forward for West Bromwich Albion and Mansfield Town.

Whenever Birmingham City play against Northampton Town, the game is dubbed 'The John Frain Derby'

== Honours ==
Birmingham City

- Associate Members' Cup: 1990–91
- Football League Third Division promotion: 1991–92

Northampton Town

- Football League Third Division play-offs: 1997
- Football League Third Division promotion: 1999–2000

Moor Green

- Southern League Cup: 2004
- Birmingham Senior Cup: 2004
