= Jack Wiseman =

Chairman of Birmingham City Football Club

Jack Wiseman was the chairman of the Birmingham City Football Club. He had been involved with the club for over 50 years, leading the organization during a time when the club's owner's bankruptcy threatened its continued existence. He died in August 2009.
