= 1994–95 Birmingham City F.C. season =

Birmingham City F.C.
1994–95 season
- Chairman: Jack Wiseman
- Manager: Barry Fry
- Stadium: St Andrew's
- Football League Second Division: 1st (promoted)
- FA Cup: Third round (eliminated by Liverpool)
- League Cup: Second round (eliminated by Blackburn Rovers)
- Football League Trophy: Winners
- Top goalscorer: League: Steve Claridge (20); All: Steve Claridge (25)
- Highest home attendance: 25,581 vs Brentford, Division Two, 26 April 1995
- Lowest home attendance: 9,847 vs Shrewsbury Town, League Cup 1st round replay, 23 August 1994
- Average home league attendance: 16,941
Home colours

The 1994–95 Football League season was Birmingham City Football Club's 92nd in the Football League and their fourth in the third tier of English football, the Football League Second Division, to which they were relegated in 1993–94. They finished in first position in the 24-team division, so were promoted straight back to Division One for 1995–96. They entered the 1994–95 FA Cup in the first round, losing in the third round to Premier League club Liverpool in a penalty shootout in which they failed to convert a single penalty. They entered the League Cup in the first round and lost to Blackburn Rovers in the second. They won the Football League Trophy for the second time in four attempts, defeating Carlisle United at Wembley in front of a crowd of 76,663 with the first golden goal to determine a major English competition.

The club's top scorer was Steve Claridge with 20 league goals and 25 in all competitions. Goalkeeper Ian Bennett missed only one match of the 63 played in all competitions, the first round of the Football League Trophy, in which his replacement Ryan Price made his only competitive first-team appearance for Birmingham.

== Football League Second Division ==
=== Match details ===
Date	League position	Opponents	Venue	Result	Score F–A	Scorers	Attendance
13 August 1994	15th	Leyton Orient	A	L	1–2	Claridge	7,578
20 August 1994	14th	Chester City	H	W	1–0	Donowa	12,188
27 August 1994	10th	Swansea City	A	W	2–0	Claridge 2	5,807
30 August 1994	11th	Wycombe Wanderers	H	L	0–1		14,305
3 September 1994	8th	Plymouth Argyle	H	W	4–2	Regis 2, Wallace, Tait	13,202
10 September 1994	11th	Oxford United	A	D	1–1	Claridge	8,072
13 September 1994	11th	Rotherham United	A	D	1–1	Bull	3,574
18 September 1994	6th	Peterborough United	H	W	4–0	Bull 2, Tait, Dominguez	10,800
24 September 1994	9th	Hull City	H	D	2–2	Claridge pen, Dominguez	12,192
1 October 1994	9th	Wrexham	A	D	1–1	Claridge	6,012
8 October 1994	9th	Huddersfield Town	H	D	1–1	Bull	15,265
15 October 1994	9th	Brighton & Hove Albion	A	W	1–0	Donowa	11,004
22 October 1994	9th	Brentford	A	W	2–1	Shearer, Ward	7,779
29 October 1994	6th	Bristol Rovers	H	W	2–0	Bull, Claridge	15,886
1 November 1994	4th	Crewe Alexandra	H	W	5–0	Hunt 3, Donowa, Claridge	14,212
5 November 1994	3rd	Shrewsbury Town	A	W	2–0	Bull, Hunt	5,949
19 November 1994	3rd	AFC Bournemouth	H	D	0–0		15,477
26 November 1994	3rd	Stockport County	A	W	1–0	Hunt	5,577
10 December 1994	2nd	Chester City	A	W	4–0	Daish, Claridge, McGavin, Lowe	3,946
17 December 1994	2nd	Leyton Orient	H	W	2–0	Donowa 2	20,022
26 December 1994	2nd	Cambridge United	H	D	1–1	Otto	20,743
28 December 1994	2nd	Cardiff City	A	W	1–0	Otto	7,420
31 December 1994	1st	Blackpool	H	W	7–1	Claridge 2, Donowa 2, Lowe, Parris, Bradshaw og	18,025
2 January 1995	1st	Bradford City	A	D	1–1	Cooper	10,539
14 January 1995	1st	York City	A	L	0–2		6,828
4 February 1995	1st	Stockport County	H	W	1–0	Dinning og	17,160
11 February 1995	3rd	Crewe Alexandra	A	L	1–2	Donowa	6,359
18 February 1995	3rd	York City	H	W	4–2	Francis 2, Otto, Shearer	14,846
21 February 1995	3rd	AFC Bournemouth	A	L	1–2	Francis	6,024
25 February 1995	2nd	Wrexham	H	W	5–2	Francis 2, Shearer, Otto, Donowa	18,884
4 March 1995	3rd	Hull City	A	D	0–0		9,854
11 March 1995	4th	Swansea City	H	L	0–1		16,191
18 March 1995	4th	Wycombe Wanderers	A	W	3–0	Shearer, Claridge, Poole	7,289
21 March 1995	3rd	Oxford United	H	W	3–0	Francis, Claridge, Daish	19,781
25 March 1995	3rd	Peterborough United	A	D	1–1	Shearer	8,796
29 March 1995	3rd	Bristol Rovers	A	D	1–1	Claridge	7,851
1 April 1995	3rd	Rotherham United	H	W	2–1	Francis, Shearer	16,077
4 April 1995	3rd	Blackpool	A	D	1–1	Claridge	4,944
11 April 1995	3rd	Shrewsbury Town	H	W	2–0	Claridge 2	18,366
15 April 1995	2nd	Cardiff City	H	W	2–1	Tait, Ward pen	17,455
17 April 1995	3rd	Cambridge United	A	L	0–1		5,317
19 April 1995	1st	Plymouth Argyle	A	W	3–1	Claridge 2, Whyte	8,550
26 April 1995	1st	Brentford	H	W	2–0	Francis, Daish	25,581
29 April 1995	1st	Brighton & Hove Albion	H	D	3–3	Dominguez, Shearer, Ward	19,006
2 May 1995	1st	Bradford City	H	D	0–0		25,139
6 May 1995	1st	Huddersfield Town	A	W	2–1	Claridge, Tait	18,775

=== League table (part) ===
Final Second Division table (part)
Pos	Team	Pld	W	D	L	GF	GA	GD	Pts
1st	Birmingham City	46	25	14	7	84	37	+47	89
2nd	Brentford	46	25	10	11	81	39	+42	85
3rd	Crewe Alexandra	46	25	8	13	80	68	+12	83
4th	Bristol Rovers	46	22	16	8	70	40	+30	82
5th	Huddersfield Town	46	22	15	9	79	49	+30	81

=== Results summary ===
Overall								Home						Away					
Pld	W	D	L	GF	GA	GD	Pts	W	D	L	GF	GA	GD	W	D	L	GF	GA	GD
46	25	14	7	84	37	+47	89	15	6	2	53	18	+35	10	8	5	31	19	+12

== FA Cup ==
Round	Date	Opponents	Venue	Result	Score F–A	Scorers	Attendance
First round	12 November 1994	Slough Town	A*	W	4–0	Shearer 2, McGavin 2	13,394
Second round	12 December 1994	Scunthorpe United	H	D	0–0		13,832
Second round replay	14 December 1994	Scunthorpe United	A	W	2–1	McGavin, Cooper	6,280
Third round	7 January 1995	Liverpool	H	D	0–0		25,326
Third round replay	18 January 1995	Liverpool	A	D	1–1 aet 0–2 pens	Otto 69'	36,275

- Played at St Andrew's, Birmingham

== League Cup ==
Round	Date	Opponents	Venue	Result	Score F–A	Scorers	Attendance
First round 1st leg	16 August 1994	Shrewsbury Town	A	L	1–2	Daish	5,049
First round 2nd leg	23 August 1994	Shrewsbury Town	H	W	2–0; 2–1 agg.	Saville, Claridge pen	9,847
Second round 1st leg	20 September 1994	Blackburn Rovers	A	L	0–2		14,517
Second round 2nd leg	4 October	Blackburn Rovers	H	D	1–1; 1–2 agg.	McGavin	16,275

== Football League Trophy ==
Round	Date	Opponents	Venue	Result	Score F–A	Scorers	Attendance
First round	27 September 1994	Peterborough United	A	W	5–3	Bull, Dominguez, Hunt 3	2,044
Second round	18 October 1994	Walsall	H	W	3–0	Shearer 2, Donowa	10,089
Third round	29 November 1994	Gillingham	H	W	3–0	McGavin, Poole, Tait	17,028
Fourth round	10 January 1995	Hereford United	H	W	3–1	Claridge, Ward pen, Otto	22,351
Southern area semi-final	31 January 1995	Swansea City	H	W	3–2; Golden goal	Claridge, Francis, Tait	20,326
Southern area final 1st leg	28 February 1995	Leyton Orient	H	W	1–0	Shearer	24,002
Southern area final 2nd leg	14 March 1995	Leyton Orient	A	W	3–2; 4–2 agg.	Claridge 2, Williams	10,830
Final	23 April 1995	Carlisle United	Wembley	W	1–0; Golden goal	Tait	76,663

== Appearances and goals ==
Numbers in parentheses denote appearances made as a substitute.
Players with name in italics and marked * were on loan from another club for the whole of their season with Birmingham.
Players marked † left the club during the playing season.
Key to positions: GK – Goalkeeper; DF – Defender; MF – Midfielder; FW – Forward

Players' appearances and goals by competition
Pos.	Nat.	Name	League		FA Cup		League Cup		Football League Trophy		Total	
Pos.	Nat.	Name	Apps	Goals	Apps	Goals	Apps	Goals	Apps	Goals	Apps	Goals
GK	ENG	Ian Bennett	46	0	5	0	4	0	7	0	62	0
GK	ENG	Ryan Price	0	0	0	0	0	0	1	0	1	0
DF	ENG	Dave Barnett	31	0	5	0	1	0	8	0	45	0
DF	ENG	Jon Bass	0	0	0	0	0 (1)	0	0	0	0 (1)	0
DF	ENG	Mick Bodley *	3	0	0	0	0	0	0	0	3	0
DF	ENG	Gary Cooper	26	1	3 (1)	1	1	0	4 (1)	0	34 (2)	2
DF	IRE	Liam Daish	37	3	5	0	3	1	7	0	52	4
DF	ENG	Richard Dryden †	3	0	0	0	1	0	0	0	4	0
DF	ENG	John Frain	6	0	1	0	2	0	1	0	10	0
DF	ENG	Ian Hendon *	4	0	0	0	0	0	0	0	4	0
DF	ENG	Scott Hiley	9	0	0	0	2	0	0	0	11	0
DF	ENG	David Howell	2	0	0	0	0	0	0	0	2	0
DF	ENG	George Parris	1 (1)	1	0	0	0	0	0	0	1 (1)	1
DF	ENG	Gary Poole	34	1	5	0	0	0	7	1	46	2
DF	ENG	Richard Scott †	5	0	0	0	3	0	2	0	10	0
DF	ENG	Bryan Small *	3	0	0	0	0	0	0	0	3	0
DF	ENG	Chris Whyte	31	1	3	0	3	0	2 (1)	0	39 (1)	1
MF	ENG	Neil Doherty	3 (5)	0	0 (1)	0	1	0	0 (2)	0	4 (8)	0
MF	POR	José Dominguez	12 (18)	3	2 (1)	0	1 (2)	0	2 (2)	1	17 (23)	4
MF	ENG	Louie Donowa	21 (10)	9	5	0	3	0	5 (1)	1	34 (11)	10
MF	POR	Rui Esteves *	0	0	0	0	0	0	1	0	1	0
MF	ENG	Paul Harding	5 (1)	0	0	0	3	0	0	0	8 (1)	0
MF	ENG	Jonathan Hunt	18 (2)	5	1	0	0	0	3	3	22 (2)	8
MF	ENG	Kenny Lowe	4 (3)	2	2 (1)	0	0 (1)	0	2 (1)	0	8 (6)	2
MF	ENG	Ricky Otto	18 (6)	4	2	1	0	0	5	1	25 (6)	6
MF	ENG	Steve Robinson	5 (1)	0	0	0	0	0	1	0	6 (1)	0
MF	ENG	Peter Shearer	20 (3)	7	2	2	2	0	4	3	28 (3)	12
MF	ENG	Paul Tait	18 (6)	4	2 (1)	0	1	0	2 (3)	3	23 (10)	7
MF	ENG	Danny Wallace †	4 (2)	1	0	0	1 (1)	0	0 (1)	0	5 (4)	1
MF	ENG	Mark Ward	41	3	4	0	3	0	7	1	55	4
MF	ENG	Matthew Webb	0 (1)	0	0	0	0	0	0	0	0 (1)	0
FW	ENG	Gary Bull *	10	6	0	0	0	0	2	1	12	7
FW	ENG	Steve Claridge	41 (1)	20	5	0	3	1	7	4	56 (1)	25
FW	ENG	Miguel de Souza †	4 (4)	0	0 (1)	0	2	0	1	0	7 (5)	0
FW	SKN	Kevin Francis	15	8	0	0	0	0	3	1	18	9
FW	ENG	Steve McGavin †	10 (5)	1	3 (1)	3	1 (1)	1	1 (3)	1	15 (10)	6
FW	ENG	Paul Moulden †	0	0	0	0	0 (1)	0	0	0	0 (1)	0
FW	ENG	Dave Regis †	4 (2)	2	0	0	1	0	0	0	5 (2)	2
FW	ENG	Andy Saville	3 (7)	0	0	0	1	1	1	0	5 (8)	0
FW	ENG	Paul Williams *	8 (3)	0	0	0	0	0	1	0	9 (3)	0
FW	ENG	Roger Willis †	1 (2)	0	0	0	0	0	0	0	1 (2)	0

== See also ==
- Birmingham City F.C. seasons

== Sources ==
- Matthews, Tony (1995). Birmingham City: A Complete Record. Derby: Breedon Books. ISBN 978-1-85983-010-9.
- Matthews, Tony (2010). Birmingham City: The Complete Record. Derby: DB Publishing. ISBN 978-1-85983-853-2.
- For match dates, league positions and results: "Birmingham City 1994–1995: Results". Statto Organisation. Archived from the original on 6 April 2016.
- For lineups, appearances, goalscorers and attendances: Matthews (2010), Complete Record, pp. 424–25, 481.
