= 1995 Football League Trophy final =

- Event: 1994–95 Football League Trophy
Birmingham City	Carlisle United
1	0
- Date: 23 April 1995
- Venue: Wembley, London
- Referee: Peter Foakes (Clacton-on-Sea)
- Attendance: 76,663

The 1995 Football League Trophy final (known as the Auto Windscreens Shields Trophy for sponsorship reasons) was the 12th final of the domestic football cup competition for teams from the Second and Third Division of the Football League. The match was played at Wembley on 23 April 1995, and was contested by Birmingham City and Carlisle United. Birmingham City won the match 1–0, with Paul Tait scoring the winning goal in extra time. The match was the first at Wembley to be decided by the golden goal rule.

== Match details ==
23 April 1995

Birmingham City	1–0 (a.e.t.)	Carlisle United
Tait 103'	(Report)

Wembley, London
Attendance: 76,663
Referee: Peter Foakes (Clacton-on-Sea)

Birmingham City	Carlisle United

GK	Ian Bennett
DF	Gary Poole
DF	Dave Barnett
DF	Liam Daish
DF	Gary Cooper
MF	Jonathan Hunt
MF	Mark Ward
MF	Peter Shearer	(substituted off) 63'
MF	Ricky Otto
FW	Steve Claridge
FW	Kevin Francis	(substituted off) 77'
Substitutes:
GK	Ryan Price
MF	Paul Tait	(substituted on) 63'
MF	Louie Donowa	(substituted on) 77'
Manager:
Barry Fry

GK	Tony Caig
DF	Darren Edmondson
DF	Dean Walling
DF	Derek Mountfield	(substituted off) 100'
DF	Tony Gallimore
MF	Rod Thomas
MF	Paul Conway
MF	Steve Hayward
MF	Richard Prokas	(substituted off) 91'
FW	David Currie
FW	Dave Reeves
Substitute:
GK	Tony Elliott
DF	Jamie Robinson	(substituted on) 100'
MF	Jeff Thorpe	(substituted on) 91'
Manager:
Mick Wadsworth

MATCH RULES

- 90 minutes.
- 30 minutes of extra-time if necessary.
- Penalty shoot-out if scores still level.
- Maximum of 3 substitutions.
