= Jonathan Hunt (footballer) =

English footballer (born 1971)

Personal information
- Full name: Jonathan Richard Hunt
- Date of birth: 2 November 1971 (age 55)
- Place of birth: Camden, England
- Height: 5 ft 10 in (1.78 m)
- Position: Midfielder

Senior career*
Years	Team	Apps	(Gls)
1990–1993	Barnet	33	(0)
1990	→ St Albans City (loan)	1	(0)
1990–1991	→ Hendon (loan)	8	(1)
1991	→ Woking (loan)		
1991	→ Basingstoke Town (loan)		
1993–1994	Southend United	49	(6)
1994–1997	Birmingham City	77	(18)
1997–1999	Derby County	25	(2)
1998	→ Sheffield United (loan)	5	(1)
1998	→ Ipswich Town (loan)	6	(0)
1999–2000	Sheffield United	22	(1)
2000	→ Cambridge United (loan)	7	(1)
2000–2001	Wimbledon	12	(0)
2002–2003	Peterborough United	0	(0)
2008–2009	St Albans City	49	(7)
2009	Harrow Borough	4	(0)
2009–2012	AFC Hornchurch	81	(18)
2012–2013	Enfield Town	30	(2)
Total		409	(57)
- * Club domestic league appearances and goals

Jonathan Richard Hunt (born 2 November 1971) is an English former footballer who made more than 200 appearances in the Football League for a variety of clubs and played in the Premier League for Derby County.

== Football career ==
Born in Camden, London, Hunt was a striker in youth football before converting to midfield, and developed into a skilful right-sided midfielder. He came through the ranks at Barnet, and had loan spells in the Isthmian League with St Albans City, Hendon, Woking and Basingstoke Town. Under Barry Fry's management, he made 33 Football League appearances and won promotion to Division Two in 1992–93, before following Fry first to Southend United, and then to Birmingham City in September 1994 in a part-exchange deal that took Dave Regis, Roger Willis and £100,000 to Southend in return for Hunt and Gary Poole.

The most successful time of Hunt's career was spent at Birmingham where he played over a hundred games. His first season was disrupted by injury, but he was still able to contribute to Birmingham becoming Division Two champions, and he played in the final of the 1994–95 Football League Trophy at Wembley, the game won by Paul Tait's golden goal. While at the club he scored 18 league goals, and was leading scorer in the 1995–96 season with 15 goals in all competitions, a performance that earned him the club's Player of the Year award.

Hunt moved on to Premier League Derby County for £500,000. Although he did play (and score) in the top flight, he only made seven first-team starts, and his career started to go downhill from there. He made loan moves to Sheffield United and Ipswich Town, both of the First Division, before joining Sheffield United on a permanent basis in a swap deal for Vasilios Borbokis. He played regularly until Neil Warnock took over as manager, and was then made available for transfer. A trial at Norwich City proving unsuccessful, Hunt made yet another loan move, this time to Cambridge United of Division Two. At the end of the 1999–2000 season Sheffield United cut their losses, paid up the remaining two years of his contract and released him.

He joined Wimbledon of the First Division in September 2000 but appeared only intermittently. The highlight of his Wimbledon career came when he scored the extra-time goal to seal a 3–1 victory over Premier League Middlesbrough in the FA Cup fifth round. With the transfer window about to close, he agreed to link up yet again with former manager Barry Fry, now at Peterborough United, but changed his mind at the last minute. He played no more first team games for Wimbledon and was released at the end of the season.

He eventually joined Fry at Second Division Peterborough in September 2002 on non-contract terms. Although Fry reportedly said he would have "no hesitation" about giving him his debut in the weekend's game, Hunt made no first team appearances for Peterborough and was released at the end of the season.

Having been out of the game for five years, in February 2008 Hunt signed a short-term contract until the end of the season for St Albans City of the Conference South, managed by former Birmingham and Peterborough colleague Steve Castle. In August 1990, as an 18-year-old, he had made one previous appearance for the club. He remained with the club until the end of the 2008–09 season, scoring 9 goals from 57 appearances in all competitions. After five Isthmian Premier matches and a goal for Harrow Borough, Hunt joined divisional rivals AFC Hornchurch in September 2009 – his friend and Harrow manager, Dave Howell, thought he should be playing at a higher level, but understood why he left: "If you were offered three times the amount of money to play at a club much nearer to your home, what would you do?" He scored 27 goals from 109 appearances in all competitions over the next three seasons, – 18 from 80 in the league to help Hornchurch gain promotion to the Conference South in 2012, and one match in the 2012–13 Conference South. In September 2012 he joined Enfield Town, and finished the season with two goals from 30 Isthmian Premier matches.

== Honours ==
Barnet

- Football League Third Division promotion: 1992–93

Birmingham City

- Football League Second Division: 1994–95
- Football League Trophy: 1994–95

== Sources ==
- Matthews, Tony (1995). Birmingham City: A Complete Record. Derby: Breedon Books. ISBN 978-1-85983-010-9.
- Matthews, Tony (2010). Birmingham City: The Complete Record. Derby: Derby Books. ISBN 978-1-85983-853-2.
- Wilson, Mike, ed. (2010). The Statistical Review of the Ryman Football League (2009/2010 ed.).
- Wilson, Mike, ed. (2011). The Statistical Review of the Ryman Football League (2010/2011 ed.).
- Wilson, Mike, ed. (2012). The Statistical Review of the Ryman Football League (2011/2012 ed.).
- Wilson, Mike, ed. (2013). The Statistical Review of the Ryman Football League (2012/2013 ed.).
