= Ricky Otto =

English footballer

Personal information
- Full name: Ricky Junior Otto
- Date of birth: 9 November 1967 (age 58)
- Place of birth: Hackney, England
- Height: 5 ft 10 in (1.78 m)
- Position: Winger

Senior career*
Years	Team	Apps	(Gls)
–1990	Haringey Borough		
1990–1993	Leyton Orient	56	(13)
1993–1994	Southend United	64	(17)
1994–1998	Birmingham City	45	(6)
1996	→ Charlton Athletic (loan)	7	(0)
1997	→ Peterborough United (loan)	16	(4)
1997	→ Notts County (loan)	4	(0)
2001	Halesowen Town		
2001	Bloxwich United		
2001	Romulus		
2002	Rhyl	2	(0)
- * Club domestic league appearances and goals

Ricky Junior Otto (born 9 November 1967) is an English former footballer.

Born in the London Borough of Hackney, he began his career with amateur side Haringey Borough, where his performances in midfield caught the eye of Leyton Orient. They signed him in 1990. His subsequent performances there alerted Southend United manager Barry Fry, who paid £100,000 to bring him to Roots Hall in 1993.

Otto followed Fry to Birmingham City for £800,000 in 1994 but never really settled at the club, having spells on loan at Charlton Athletic, a third spell with Fry at Peterborough United and Notts County. He was however part of the side that won the 1995 Football League Trophy Final and set up the winning goal for Paul Tait. He has the conspicuous record of having scored both goals in a 1–1 draw on his debut against Cambridge United. Released in 1998, he had a spell in non-League football before signing for Rhyl in 2002.

After retiring from football, Otto trained and worked as a probation officer, and went on to found a consultancy working with offenders and those at risk of offending. He became a Christian, and took a degree in theology.

== Honours ==
Birmingham City

- Football League Second Division: 1994–95
- Football League Trophy: 1994–95
