= Jeff Thorpe =

English footballer

Personal information
- Full name: Jeffrey Thorpe
- Date of birth: 17 November 1972 (age 53)
- Place of birth: Cockermouth, England
- Position: Midfielder

Youth career
- Carlisle United

Senior career*
Years	Team	Apps	(Gls)
1989–2000	Carlisle United	224	(6)
Total		224	(6)
- * Club domestic league appearances and goals

Jeffrey "Jeff" Thorpe (born 17 November 1972, in Cockermouth, Cumbria) is an English retired professional footballer who played as a midfielder.

He spent his entire career at Carlisle United before retiring in 2000 due to injury.

He played in the Championship winning 1994–95 season, scoring 4 goals, and made a substitute appearance at Wembley Stadium against Birmingham City in the 1995 Football League Trophy final.

Persistent back injuries bought a premature end to his career aged just 27 after 11 years with Carlisle. Thorpe spent several years as Radio Cumbria match day summariser on Carlisle games. He lectured in Sport Performance at the University of Cumbria for 11 years and still resides in the county where he also runs a coaching and fitness business.

Jeff now plays bowls at Croft Bowling Club in Cockermouth, where he recently won the Bob Gibb Trophy for Newbies.

== Honours ==
Carlisle United

- Football League Third Division: 1994–95
- Football League Trophy runner-up: 1994–95
