= PFA Team of the Year (1990s) =

Annual award

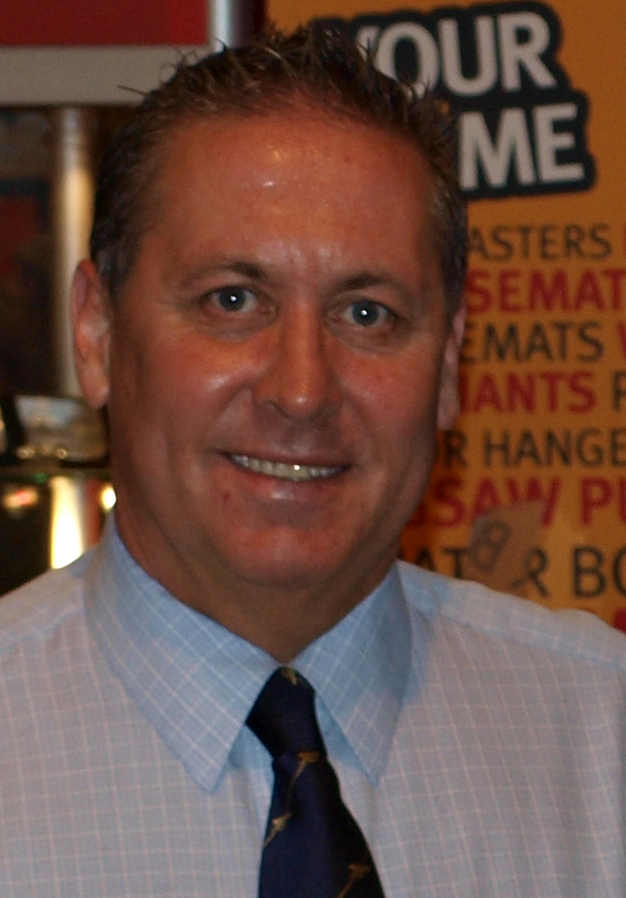
Kenny Sansom appeared in a PFA Team of the Year on 11 occasions, which is more than any other player.

The Professional Footballers' Association Team of the Year (often called the PFA Team of the Year, or simply the Team of the Year) is an annual award given to a set of 55 footballers across the top four tiers of men's English football; the Premier League, the Championship, League One and League Two, as well as the women's FA WSL, who are seen to be deserving of being named in a "Team of the Year". Peter Shilton currently holds the most appearances in the PFA Team of the Year in the top division with 10 appearances. Steven Gerrard currently holds the most appearances in the PFA Team of the Year in the Premier League era with eight appearances.

The award has been presented since the 1973–74 season and the shortlist is compiled by the members of the players' trade union, the Professional Footballers' Association (PFA), in January of every year, with the winners then being voted for by the other players in their respective divisions. The award is regarded by players in the Football League as the highest accolade available to them, due to it being picked by their fellow professionals. Oxford United's Damian Batt, who was named in the Team of the Year for League Two in 2011, said he was "very pleased to be given such a prestigious award. It is something that I am very proud of". In 2014, a team for female players competing in the FA WSL was selected for the first time.

== Key ==
- Heading key: Pos. – Position; App. – Number of appearances in a PFA Team of the Year.
- Position key: GK – Goalkeeper; DF – Defender; MF – Midfielder; FW – Forward.
- Players marked † appeared in a first tier PFA Team of the Year more than once.
- Players marked ‡ appeared in a second tier PFA Team of the Year more than once.
- Players marked * appeared in a third tier PFA Team of the Year more than once.
- Players marked ¤ appeared in a fourth tier PFA Team of the Year more than once.

== Winners ==
=== 1989–90 ===
==== First Division ====
Pos.	Player	Club	App.
GK	Neville Southall †	Everton	4
DF	Lee Dixon	Arsenal	2
DF	Des Walker †	Nottingham Forest	2
DF	Alan Hansen †	Liverpool	6
DF	Stuart Pearce †	Nottingham Forest	3
MF	David Platt	Aston Villa	1
MF	Steve Hodge	Nottingham Forest	1
MF	Steve McMahon †	Liverpool	2
MF	John Barnes †	Liverpool	2
FW	Peter Beardsley †	Liverpool	3
FW	Gary Lineker †	Tottenham Hotspur	2

==== Second Division ====
Pos.	Player	Club	App.
GK	Tony Coton ‡	Watford	2
DF	Denis Irwin	Oldham Athletic	1
DF	Chris Fairclough	Leeds United	1
DF	Earl Barrett	Oldham Athletic	1
DF	Julian Dicks ‡	West Ham United	2
MF	Gordon Strachan	Leeds United	1
MF	Gary McAllister ‡	Leicester City	2
MF	Scott Sellars	Blackburn Rovers	1
FW	Andy Ritchie	Oldham Athletic	1
FW	Micky Quinn ‡	Newcastle United	2
FW	Steve Bull	Wolverhampton Wanderers	3

==== Third Division ====
Pos.	Player	Club	App.
GK	Eric Nixon	Tranmere Rovers	2
DF	Phil Brown *	Bolton Wanderers	3
DF	Rob Newman *	Bristol City	2
DF	Dean Yates *	Notts County	2
DF	Paul Edwards	Crewe Alexandra	1
MF	Jim Harvey	Tranmere Rovers	6
MF	Shaun Goodwin	Rotherham United	1
MF	Steve Thompson	Bolton Wanderers	1
FW	Bobby Williamson	Rotherham United	1
FW	Ian Muir	Tranmere Rovers	2
FW	David Lee	Bury	1

==== Fourth Division ====
Pos.	Player	Club	App.
GK	Chris Marples	York City	1
DF	Scott Hiley	Exeter City	1
DF	Shaun Taylor ¤	Exeter City	2
DF	Paul Fitzpatrick	Carlisle United	1
DF	Rob McKinnon	Hartlepool United	1
MF	Mick Halsall	Peterborough United	1
MF	Steve Spooner	York City	1
MF	Danny Bailey	Exeter City	1
FW	Darran Rowbotham	Exeter City	1
FW	David Crown	Southend United	1
FW	Steve Neville	Exeter City	1

=== 1990–91 ===
==== First Division ====
Pos.	Player	Club	App.
GK	David Seaman	Arsenal	1
DF	Lee Dixon †	Arsenal	3
DF	Des Walker †	Nottingham Forest	3
DF	Mark Wright	Derby County	1
DF	Stuart Pearce †	Nottingham Forest	4
MF	Gordon Strachan	Leeds United	2
MF	Paul Gascoigne †	Tottenham Hotspur	2
MF	Andy Townsend †	Chelsea	2
MF	John Barnes †	Liverpool	3
FW	Mark Hughes †	Manchester United	3
FW	Ian Rush †	Liverpool	5

==== Second Division ====
Pos.	Player	Club	App.
GK	Luděk Mikloško	West Ham United	1
DF	David Kerslake	Swindon Town	1
DF	Earl Barrett ‡	Oldham Athletic	2
DF	Nigel Pearson	Sheffield Wednesday	1
DF	Paul Bodin	Swindon Town	1
MF	Ian Bishop	West Ham United	1
MF	John Sheridan ‡	Sheffield Wednesday	4
MF	Carlton Palmer	Sheffield Wednesday	1
FW	David Hirst	Sheffield Wednesday	1
FW	Steve Bull ‡	Wolverhampton Wanderers	4
FW	Trevor Morley	West Ham United	2

==== Third Division ====
Pos.	Player	Club	App.
GK	Eric Nixon *	Tranmere Rovers	3
DF	Phil Brown *	Bolton Wanderers	4
DF	Lee Sinnott	Bradford City	1
DF	Peter Atherton	Wigan Athletic	1
DF	Chris Coleman *	Swansea City	2
MF	Neil McNab	Tranmere Rovers	2
MF	Steve Castle	Leyton Orient	1
MF	Keith Jones	Brentford	1
FW	Brett Angell	Southend United	1
FW	Tony Philliskirk	Bolton Wanderers	1
FW	Wayne Biggins	Stoke City	1

==== Fourth Division ====
Pos.	Player	Club	App.
GK	Keith Welch	Rochdale	1
DF	Malcolm Brown ¤	Stockport County	5
DF	Steve Davis	Burnley	1
DF	Brendan Ormsby	Doncaster Rovers	1
DF	Rufus Brevett	Doncaster Rovers	1
MF	Gary Gill	Darlington	1
MF	David Frain	Stockport County	1
MF	Mick Halsall ¤	Peterborough United	2
FW	Stuart Rimmer ¤	Walsall	2
FW	Joe Allon	Hartlepool United	1
FW	Steve Butler	Maidstone United	1

=== 1991–92 ===
==== First Division ====
Pos.	Player	Club	App.
GK	Tony Coton	Manchester City	3
DF	Rob Jones	Liverpool	1
DF	Gary Pallister	Manchester United	3
DF	Des Walker †	Nottingham Forest	4
DF	Stuart Pearce †	Nottingham Forest	5
MF	Ray Houghton	Liverpool	2
MF	Gary McAllister	Leeds United	3
MF	Andy Townsend †	Chelsea	3
FW	Gary Lineker †	Tottenham Hotspur	3
FW	Alan Shearer	Southampton	1
FW	Mark Hughes †	Manchester United	4

==== Second Division ====
Pos.	Player	Club	App.
GK	David James	Watford	1
DF	David Kerslake ‡	Swindon Town	2
DF	David Linighan	Ipswich Town	1
DF	Colin Calderwood	Swindon Town	1
DF	John Beresford	Portsmouth	1
MF	Micky Hazard	Swindon Town	1
MF	Gordon Cowans	Blackburn Rovers	1
MF	Scott Sellars ‡	Blackburn Rovers	2
FW	Duncan Shearer	Swindon Town	1
FW	John Aldridge	Tranmere Rovers	2
FW	David Speedie	Blackburn Rovers	1

==== Third Division ====
Pos.	Player	Club	App.
GK	Chris Turner *	Leyton Orient	2
DF	Scott Hiley	Exeter City	2
DF	Terry Evans	Brentford	1
DF	Vince Overson	Stoke City	1
DF	Simon Charlton	Huddersfield Town	1
MF	Chris Marsden	Huddersfield Town	1
MF	Tony Kelly	Bolton Wanderers	1
MF	Nigel Gleghorn	Birmingham City	1
FW	Wayne Biggins	Stoke City	1
FW	Dean Holdsworth	Brentford	1
FW	Iwan Roberts	Huddersfield Town	1

==== Fourth Division ====
Pos.	Player	Club	App.
GK	Kelham O'Hanlon	Carlisle United	1
DF	Paul Fleming	Mansfield Town	1
DF	Steve Davis	Burnley	1
DF	Alan Walker	Gillingham	1
DF	Phil Hardy	Wrexham	1
MF	Shaun Goodwin	Rotherham United	2
MF	Paul Groves	Blackpool	1
MF	Kenny Lowe	Barnet	1
FW	Gary Bull	Barnet	1
FW	Dave Bamber	Blackpool	1
FW	Phil Stant ¤	Mansfield Town	2

=== 1992–93 ===
==== FA Premier League ====
Pos.	Player	Club	App.
GK	Peter Schmeichel	Manchester United	1
DF	David Bardsley	Queens Park Rangers	2
DF	Paul McGrath †	Aston Villa	2
DF	Gary Pallister †	Manchester United	4
DF	Tony Dorigo	Leeds United	2
MF	Roy Keane	Nottingham Forest	1
MF	Gary Speed	Leeds United	1
MF	Paul Ince	Manchester United	1
MF	Ryan Giggs	Manchester United	1
FW	Alan Shearer	Blackburn Rovers	2
FW	Ian Wright	Arsenal	2

==== First Division ====
Pos.	Player	Club	App.
GK	Luděk Mikloško ‡	West Ham United	2
DF	David Kerslake ‡	Swindon Town	3
DF	Craig Short	Derby County	1
DF	Colin Cooper	Millwall	1
DF	John Beresford ‡	Newcastle United	2
MF	Lee Clark	Newcastle United	1
MF	Micky Hazard ‡	Swindon Town	2
MF	Martin Allen	West Ham United	1
FW	John Aldridge ‡	Tranmere Rovers	3
FW	Guy Whittingham	Portsmouth	1
FW	Gavin Peacock	Newcastle United	1

==== Second Division ====
Pos.	Player	Club	App.
GK	Marlon Beresford	Burnley	1
DF	Scott Hiley *	Exeter City	3
DF	Vince Overson *	Stoke City	2
DF	Peter Swan	Port Vale	1
DF	Simon Charlton *	Huddersfield Town	2
MF	Ray Walker *	Port Vale	3
MF	Ian Taylor	Port Vale	1
MF	Darren Bradley	West Bromwich Albion	1
FW	Mark Stein	Stoke City	1
FW	Andy Walker	Bolton Wanderers	1
FW	Bob Taylor	West Bromwich Albion	1

==== Third Division ====
Pos.	Player	Club	App.
GK	Mark Prudhoe	Darlington	1
DF	Andy McMillan	York City	1
DF	Paul Stancliffe	York City	1
DF	Matt Elliott	Scunthorpe United	1
DF	Damon Searle	Cardiff City	1
MF	Kenny Lowe	Barnet	1
MF	Derek Payne	Barnet	1
MF	Gareth Owen	Wrexham	1
FW	Gary Bull ¤	Barnet	2
FW	Darren Foreman	Scarborough	1
FW	Carl Griffiths	Shrewsbury Town	1

=== 1993–94 ===
==== FA Premier League ====
Pos.	Player	Club	App.
GK	Tim Flowers	Blackburn Rovers	1
DF	Gary Kelly	Leeds United	1
DF	Gary Pallister †	Manchester United	5
DF	Tony Adams †	Arsenal	2
DF	Denis Irwin	Manchester United	2
MF	Paul Ince †	Manchester United	2
MF	Gary McAllister †	Leeds United	4
MF	David Batty	Blackburn Rovers	1
FW	Alan Shearer †	Blackburn Rovers	3
FW	Eric Cantona	Manchester United	1
FW	Peter Beardsley †	Newcastle United	4

==== First Division ====
Pos.	Player	Club	App.
GK	Nigel Martyn	Crystal Palace	2
DF	Gary Charles	Derby County	1
DF	Colin Cooper ‡	Nottingham Forest	2
DF	Eric Young	Crystal Palace	1
DF	Scott Minto	Charlton Athletic	1
MF	Jason McAteer	Bolton Wanderers	1
MF	Mark Draper	Notts County	1
MF	Scot Gemmill	Nottingham Forest	1
FW	Stan Collymore	Nottingham Forest	1
FW	Paul Walsh	Portsmouth	3
FW	Chris Armstrong	Crystal Palace	1

==== Second Division ====
Pos.	Player	Club	App.
GK	Marlon Beresford *	Burnley	2
DF	Neil Aspin	Port Vale	1
DF	Ady Williams	Reading	1
DF	Dean Glover	Port Vale	1
DF	Dylan Kerr	Reading	1
MF	Steve Castle	Plymouth Argyle	1
MF	Ian Taylor *	Port Vale	2
MF	Ian Bogie	Leyton Orient	1
FW	Jimmy Quinn	Reading	1
FW	Andy Preece	Stockport County	1
FW	Dean Windass	Hull City	1

==== Third Division ====
Pos.	Player	Club	App.
GK	Martin Hodge	Rochdale	1
DF	Jason Cousins	Wycombe Wanderers	1
DF	Terry Evans	Wycombe Wanderers	1
DF	Alan Reeves	Rochdale	1
DF	Roger Stanislaus	Bury	1
MF	Steve Guppy	Wycombe Wanderers	1
MF	Tony Rigby	Bury	1
MF	Neil Lennon	Crewe Alexandra	1
FW	Tony Ellis	Preston North End	1
FW	Dean Spink	Shrewsbury Town	1
FW	Dave Reeves	Carlisle United	1

=== 1994–95 ===
==== FA Premier League ====
Pos.	Player	Club	App.
GK	Tim Flowers †	Blackburn Rovers	2
DF	Rob Jones †	Liverpool	2
DF	Gary Pallister †	Manchester United	6
DF	Colin Hendry	Blackburn Rovers	2
DF	Graeme Le Saux	Blackburn Rovers	1
MF	Tim Sherwood	Blackburn Rovers	1
MF	Matt Le Tissier	Southampton	1
MF	Paul Ince †	Manchester United	3
FW	Jürgen Klinsmann	Tottenham Hotspur	1
FW	Chris Sutton	Blackburn Rovers	1
FW	Alan Shearer †	Blackburn Rovers	4

==== First Division ====
Pos.	Player	Club	App.
GK	Shaka Hislop	Reading	1
DF	Neil Cox	Middlesbrough	1
DF	Alan Stubbs	Bolton Wanderers	1
DF	Craig Short ‡	Derby County	2
DF	Ben Thatcher	Millwall	1
MF	Jason McAteer ‡	Bolton Wanderers	2
MF	Alex Rae	Millwall	1
MF	Jamie Pollock	Middlesbrough	1
FW	Jan Åge Fjørtoft	Middlesbrough (Note: Fjørtoft played for Swindon Town until March 1995.)	1
FW	John Hendrie ‡	Middlesbrough	3
FW	John Aldridge ‡	Tranmere Rovers	4

==== Second Division ====
Pos.	Player	Club	App.
GK	Ian Bennett	Birmingham City	1
DF	Gary Poole	Birmingham City	1
DF	Liam Daish	Birmingham City	1
DF	Dean Richards	Bradford City	1
DF	Tom Cowan	Huddersfield Town	1
MF	John Cornforth	Swansea City	1
MF	Mark Ward	Birmingham City	1
MF	Neil Lennon	Crewe Alexandra	2
FW	Gary Bennett	Wrexham	1
FW	Andy Booth	Huddersfield Town	1
FW	Nicky Forster	Brentford	1

==== Third Division ====
Pos.	Player	Club	App.
GK	Gary Kelly	Bury	1
DF	Duncan Jupp	Fulham	1
DF	Dean Walling	Carlisle United	1
DF	Russ Wilcox	Doncaster Rovers	1
DF	Tony Gallimore	Carlisle United	1
MF	Martin O'Connor	Walsall	1
MF	Paul Holland	Mansfield Town	1
MF	Wayne Bullimore	Scunthorpe United	1
FW	Dave Reeves ¤	Carlisle United	2
FW	Dougie Freedman	Barnet	1
FW	Kyle Lightbourne	Walsall	1

=== 1995–96 ===
==== FA Premier League ====
Pos.	Player	Club	App.
GK	David James	Liverpool	2
DF	Gary Neville	Manchester United	1
DF	Tony Adams †	Arsenal	3
DF	Ugo Ehiogu	Aston Villa	1
DF	Alan Wright	Aston Villa	1
MF	Steve Stone	Nottingham Forest	1
MF	Rob Lee	Newcastle United	1
MF	Ruud Gullit	Chelsea	1
MF	David Ginola	Newcastle United	1
FW	Les Ferdinand	Newcastle United	1
FW	Alan Shearer †	Blackburn Rovers	5

==== First Division ====
Pos.	Player	Club	App.
GK	Alan Kelly	Sheffield United	1
DF	Dariusz Kubicki	Sunderland	1
DF	Dean Richards	Wolverhampton Wanderers	2
DF	Richard Rufus	Charlton Athletic	1
DF	Dean Gordon	Crystal Palace	1
MF	Lee Bowyer	Charlton Athletic	1
MF	Alex Rae ‡	Millwall	2
MF	Garry Parker	Leicester City	1
MF	Michael Gray	Sunderland	1
FW	Dean Sturridge	Derby County	1
FW	Steve Claridge	Leicester City	1

==== Second Division ====
Pos.	Player	Club	App.
GK	Darren Ward	Notts County	1
DF	Chris Wilder	Notts County	1
DF	Shaun Taylor	Swindon Town	3
DF	Ian Culverhouse	Swindon Town	1
DF	Paul Bodin	Swindon Town	2
MF	Martin O'Connor	Walsall	2
MF	Neil Lennon *	Crewe Alexandra	3
MF	Micky Mellon	Blackpool	1
MF	Karl Connolly	Wrexham	1
FW	Marcus Stewart	Bristol Rovers	1
FW	Kurt Nogan	Burnley	1

==== Third Division ====
Pos.	Player	Club	App.
GK	Jim Stannard ¤	Gillingham	2
DF	Duncan Jupp ¤	Fulham	2
DF	Mick Heathcote	Plymouth Argyle	1
DF	Russ Wilcox ¤	Preston North End	2
DF	Paul Williams	Plymouth Argyle	1
MF	Simon Davey	Preston North End	1
MF	Mark Kinsella	Colchester United	1
MF	Roberto Martínez	Wigan Athletic	1
MF	Ian Bryson	Preston North End	1
FW	Andy Saville	Preston North End	1
FW	Carl Dale	Cardiff City	1

=== 1996–97 ===
==== FA Premier League ====
Pos.	Player	Club	App.
GK	David Seaman †	Arsenal	2
DF	Gary Neville †	Manchester United	2
DF	Tony Adams †	Arsenal	4
DF	Mark Wright †	Liverpool	2
DF	Stig Inge Bjørnebye	Liverpool	1
MF	David Beckham	Manchester United	1
MF	Roy Keane †	Manchester United	2
MF	David Batty †	Newcastle United	2
MF	Steve McManaman	Liverpool	1
FW	Alan Shearer †	Newcastle United	6
FW	Ian Wright †	Arsenal	3

==== First Division ====
Pos.	Player	Club	App.
GK	Alan Kelly ‡	Sheffield United	2
DF	Nicky Eaden	Barnsley	1
DF	Gerry Taggart	Bolton Wanderers	1
DF	Dean Richards ‡	Wolverhampton Wanderers	3
DF	Steve Froggatt	Wolverhampton Wanderers	1
MF	Trevor Sinclair	Queens Park Rangers	1
MF	Alan Thompson	Bolton Wanderers	1
MF	Darren Eadie	Norwich City	1
MF	Georgi Kinkladze	Manchester City	1
FW	Mike Sheron	Stoke City	1
FW	John McGinlay	Bolton Wanderers	1

==== Second Division ====
Pos.	Player	Club	App.
GK	Kevin Miller	Watford	1
DF	Gary Parkinson	Burnley	1
DF	Mike Flynn	Stockport County	1
DF	Steve Davis	Luton Town	2
DF	David Eyres	Burnley	1
MF	Gareth Whalley	Crewe Alexandra	1
MF	Danny Murphy	Crewe Alexandra	1
MF	Bryan Hughes	Wrexham	1
MF	Chris Marsden *	Stockport County	2
FW	Tony Thorpe	Luton Town	1
FW	Carl Asaba	Brentford	1

==== Third Division ====
Pos.	Player	Club	App.
GK	Tony Caig	Carlisle United	1
DF	Ian Hendon	Leyton Orient	1
DF	Dean Walling ¤	Carlisle United	2
DF	Jody Craddock	Cambridge United	1
DF	Owen Archdeacon	Carlisle United	1
MF	Gareth Ainsworth	Lincoln City	1
MF	Roberto Martínez ¤	Wigan Athletic	2
MF	Jan Mølby	Swansea City	1
MF	Warren Aspinall	Carlisle United	1
FW	Graeme Jones	Wigan Athletic	1
FW	Mike Conroy	Fulham	1

=== 1997–98 ===
==== FA Premier League ====
Pos.	Player	Club	App.
GK	Nigel Martyn	Leeds United	3
DF	Gary Neville †	Manchester United	3
DF	Gary Pallister †	Manchester United	7
DF	Colin Hendry †	Blackburn Rovers	3
DF	Graeme Le Saux †	Chelsea	2
MF	David Beckham †	Manchester United	2
MF	Nicky Butt	Manchester United	1
MF	David Batty †	Newcastle United	3
MF	Ryan Giggs †	Manchester United	2
FW	Michael Owen	Liverpool	1
FW	Dennis Bergkamp	Arsenal	1

==== First Division ====
Pos.	Player	Club	App.
GK	Alan Miller	West Bromwich Albion	1
DF	Kieron Dyer	Ipswich Town	1
DF	Nigel Pearson	Middlesbrough	2
DF	Colin Cooper ‡	Nottingham Forest	3
DF	Mauricio Taricco	Ipswich Town	1
MF	John Robinson	Charlton Athletic	1
MF	Lee Clark	Sunderland	1
MF	Robbie Keane	Wolverhampton Wanderers	1
MF	Georgi Kinkladze ‡	Manchester City	2
FW	Pierre van Hooijdonk	Nottingham Forest	1
FW	Paul Merson	Middlesbrough	1

==== Second Division ====
Pos.	Player	Club	App.
GK	Alec Chamberlain	Watford	1
DF	Gary Parkinson	Preston North End	2
DF	Shaun Taylor *	Bristol City	4
DF	Chris Coleman *	Fulham	3
DF	Peter Kennedy	Watford	1
MF	Kevin Donovan	Grimsby Town	1
MF	Paul Bracewell	Fulham	1
MF	Paul Groves	Grimsby Town	2
MF	John Hodge	Walsall	1
FW	Roger Boli	Walsall	1
FW	Shaun Goater	Bristol City	1

==== Third Division ====
Pos.	Player	Club	App.
GK	Darren Ward	Notts County	2
DF	Ian Hendon ¤	Notts County	2
DF	Gary Strodder	Notts County	1
DF	Dean Walling ¤	Lincoln City	3
DF	Dennis Pearce	Notts County	1
MF	David Farrell	Peterborough United	1
MF	Jon Cullen	Hartlepool United	1
MF	Martin Ling	Leyton Orient	1
MF	Scott Houghton	Peterborough United	1
FW	Jimmy Quinn	Peterborough United	2
FW	Rodney Jack	Torquay United	1

=== 1998–99 ===
==== FA Premier League ====
Pos.	Player	Club	App.
GK	Nigel Martyn †	Leeds United	4
DF	Gary Neville †	Manchester United	4
DF	Sol Campbell	Tottenham Hotspur	1
DF	Jaap Stam	Manchester United	1
DF	Denis Irwin †	Manchester United	3
MF	David Beckham †	Manchester United	3
MF	Emmanuel Petit	Arsenal	1
MF	Patrick Vieira	Arsenal	1
MF	David Ginola †	Tottenham Hotspur	2
FW	Dwight Yorke	Manchester United	1
FW	Nicolas Anelka	Arsenal	1

==== First Division ====
Pos.	Player	Club	App.
GK	Richard Wright	Ipswich Town	1
DF	Gary Rowett	Birmingham City	1
DF	Michael Gray ‡	Sunderland	2
DF	Darren Moore	Bradford City	1
DF	Paul Butler (Note: Players tied for position.)	Sunderland	1
DF	Mark Venus	Ipswich Town	1
MF	Kieron Dyer ‡	Ipswich Town	2
MF	Per Frandsen	Bolton Wanderers	1
MF	Lee Clark ‡	Sunderland	2
MF	Allan Johnston	Sunderland	1
FW	Lee Hughes	West Bromwich Albion	1
FW	Niall Quinn	Sunderland	1

==== Second Division ====
Pos.	Player	Club	App.
GK	Maik Taylor	Fulham	1
DF	Steve Finnan	Fulham	1
DF	Chris Coleman *	Fulham	4
DF	Steve Davis *	Burnley	3
DF	Rufus Brevett	Fulham	1
DF	Jamie Vincent	Bournemouth	1
MF	Darren Wrack	Walsall	1
MF	Sean Gregan	Preston North End	1
MF	Graham Kavanagh	Stoke City	1
MF	Stephen Robinson	Bournemouth	1
FW	Mark Stein *	Bournemouth	2
FW	Geoff Horsfield	Fulham	1

==== Third Division ====
Pos.	Player	Club	App.
GK	Jon Hallworth	Cardiff City	1
DF	Mark Delaney	Cardiff City	1
DF	Chris Hope	Scunthorpe United	1
DF	Hermann Hreiðarsson	Brentford	1
DF	Paul Gibbs	Plymouth Argyle	1
MF	Jeff Minton	Brighton & Hove Albion	1
MF	Jason Fowler	Cardiff City	1
MF	Paul Evans	Shrewsbury Town	1
MF	Simon Davies	Peterborough United	1
MF	Matthew Etherington	Peterborough United	1
FW	Jamie Forrester	Scunthorpe United	1
FW	Martin Butler	Cambridge United	1

== See also ==
- PFA Team of the Year (1970s)
- PFA Team of the Year (1980s)
- PFA Team of the Year (2000s)
- PFA Team of the Year (2010s)
- PFA Team of the Year (2020s)
