= Liam Daish =

Irish international footballer and manager (born 1968)

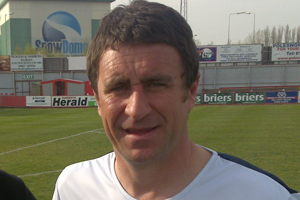
- Daish in 2010

Personal information
- Full name: Liam Sean Daish
- Date of birth: 23 September 1968 (age 58)
- Place of birth: Portsmouth, England
- Height: 6 ft 2 in (1.88 m)
- Position: Centre-half

Team information
- Current team: Birmingham City (academy manager)

Youth career
- 1984–1986: Portsmouth

Senior career*
Years	Team	Apps	(Gls)
1986–1988	Portsmouth	1	(0)
1988–1994	Cambridge United	139	(4)
1988	→ Barnet (loan)	12	(0)
1994–1996	Birmingham City	73	(3)
1996–1999	Coventry City	31	(2)
1999–2003	Havant & Waterlooville	120	(10)
Total		374	(12)

International career
1992–1996	Republic of Ireland	5	(0)
1994	Republic of Ireland B	1	(0)

Managerial career
- 2000–2004: Havant & Waterlooville (joint)
- 2004–2005: Welling United (caretaker)
- 2005–2013: Ebbsfleet United
- 2014–2015: Nuneaton Town
- * Club domestic league appearances and goals

Liam Sean Daish (born 23 September 1968) is a football coach, manager and former professional player who was appointed academy manager at Birmingham City in 2022.

Daish was a centre-half who played in the Football League for Portsmouth, Cambridge United and Birmingham City, in the Premier League for Coventry City, and in non-league football for Barnet and Havant & Waterlooville. Born in England, he was capped five times at senior level by the Republic of Ireland, for which he qualified by descent.

After his playing career was shortened by a knee injury in 2002, he continued his football career as a manager and coach. He had spells as manager of Havant & Waterlooville, Welling United (on a caretaker basis), Ebbsfleet United and Nuneaton Town, and coached for five years in Portsmouth's academy before joining Birmingham City as academy manager.

== Playing career ==
Daish was born in Portsmouth, Hampshire, and began his career with his hometown club Portsmouth However, he only made one appearance for the club's first team before he was released in 1988. He went in search of first-team football, which he found at Cambridge United. While at Cambridge, Daish helped the club to successive promotions from the Fourth to the Second Division. He also made his international debut for the Republic of Ireland, on 19 February 1992 at home to Wales, while Cambridge were pushing for a third successive promotion. However, they fell in the playoffs and were relegated a year later.

The quality of his performances for Cambridge United inspired Barry Fry to sign him for Birmingham City for a fee of £50,000 in January 1994. Daish spent just over two years at St Andrew's, making nearly 100 appearances in all competitions. He captained the side to the Division Two championship in 1994–95 and to victory in the 1995 Football League Trophy Final at Wembley. Fry, who managed him throughout his spell at Birmingham, once said of Daish that if a squadron of F-111s attacked the Birmingham penalty area he would attempt to head them away. On 10 December 1994, Daish – then Birmingham City captain under Fry – scored a goal against Chester to make it 0–4. In the ensuing celebrations, some Blues fan threw a toy trumpet onto the pitch, which Daish proceeded to play. Although he was not sent off, the referee booked him, taking his season's points tally to 41 which resulted in a three-match ban. Fry was not amused: "I know the referee has directives to adhere to, but to get banned through being booked for that seems a bit harsh."

In February 1996, Daish joined Coventry City for a fee of £1.5 million. He made an immediate impact, bolstering Coventry's shaky defence and improving their form overall. However, in the four seasons that he spent at Coventry, Daish was never a regular in the first team (he played in only 34 games for the Sky Blues). This was the result of a severe knee ligament injury which eventually forced his retirement from the professional game after two years on the sidelines.

Daish joined non-league Havant & Waterlooville in 1999, going on to make 157 appearances (1 as substitute) in league and cup competitions, scoring 15 goals, before his playing career was finally ended by a knee injury sustained in October 2002.

== Managerial career ==
In April 2000, Daish took on a joint-manager role alongside Mick Jenkins at Havant & Waterlooville after Billy Gilbert stood down. He spent three and a half years in this role, during which time he took the club to the semi-final of the FA Trophy in 2003, before being sacked in January 2004 following a string of bad results.

Following this, he joined Welling United as a coach. For a time, following the dismissal of Paul Parker, Daish served as caretaker-manager of Welling but did not get the job full-time, despite leading the side to three wins and a draw in his four games in charge.

Daish left Welling in February 2005 to become manager of Gravesend & Northfleet, which in May 2007 was renamed Ebbsfleet United, and he oversaw the club's move to a full-time playing squad. Daish led Ebbsfleet United to a 1–0 victory in the 2008 FA Trophy Final, and for two seasons running made the Fleet a contender for the Conference National play-offs. His profile was raised by the takeover of Ebbsfleet by MyFootballClub, although the website's initial boasts that its members – and not Daish – would pick the team had as of 22 May 2010 yet to come to fruition. Daish left Ebbsfleet by mutual consent after discussions with new owners and eight years in charge on 17 May 2013.

Daish joined Conference Premier club Nuneaton Town on 22 September 2014 as first-team manager, and left at the end of the season following the team's relegation.

He worked for Portsmouth's football academy from 2017 to 2022. In November 2022, he was appointed manager of Birmingham City's academy.

== Career statistics ==
Appearances and goals by national team and year
National team	Year	Apps	Goals
Republic of Ireland	1992	2	0
Republic of Ireland	1993	0	0
Republic of Ireland	1994	0	0
Republic of Ireland	1995	0	0
Republic of Ireland	1996	3	0
Total		5	0

== Honours ==
Cambridge United

- Football League Third Division: 1990–91

Birmingham City

- Football League Second Division: 1994–95
- Football League Trophy: 1994–95

Ebbsfleet United

- FA Trophy: 2007–08

Individual

- PFA Team of the Year: 1994–95 Second Division

== See also ==
- List of Republic of Ireland international footballers born outside the Republic of Ireland
