= Peter Shearer =

English footballer (born 1967)

Personal information
- Full name: Peter Andrew Shearer
- Date of birth: 4 February 1967 (age 59)
- Place of birth: Birmingham, England
- Positions: Forward; midfielder

Youth career
- Coventry City
- 1983–1985: Birmingham City

Senior career*
Years	Team	Apps	(Gls)
1985–1986	Birmingham City	4	(0)
1986	Rochdale	1	(0)
1986–1988	Nuneaton Borough		
1988–1989	Cheltenham Town		
1989–1994	AFC Bournemouth	85	(10)
1994–1996	Birmingham City	25	(7)
1997–1998	Peterborough United	0	(0)

International career
	England National Game	1	(0)
- * Club domestic league appearances and goals

Peter Andrew Shearer (born 4 February 1967) is an English former professional footballer who played as a forward or midfielder for a number of teams in the lower divisions of the Football League in the 1980s and 1990s.

== Club career ==
Shearer was born in Birmingham, and began his football career as a schoolboy with Coventry City. When he left school in 1983 he joined Birmingham City as an apprentice, and signed professional forms two years later. He made his first-team debut as a 17-year-old, on 3 November 1984, as a substitute in a goalless draw at home to Shrewsbury Town in the Football League Second Division. He played four more first-team games that season, at the end of which Birmingham were promoted to the top flight, but made no further appearances, and in April 1986, he was one of several players released with the club in financial difficulties.

Moving on to Rochdale of the Third Division, Shearer played only one league game before dropping into non-league football six months later with Nuneaton Borough. A year with Nuneaton and a successful spell with Cheltenham Town, during which he was capped for the England's semi-professional representative side, brought him an £18,000 move back to the Second Division with Harry Redknapp's AFC Bournemouth.

Shearer's form at Bournemouth impressed sufficiently for a £500,000 move to First Division club Wimbledon to be projected, but a knee injury spoilt his plans. In December 1992, after the player's return to fitness, Cheltenham manager Lindsay Parsons predicted that Shearer would "be a Premier League player in a month"; Cheltenham Town would receive a third of any fee paid to Bournemouth for such a sale.

After trials with Coventry City and Dundee, Barry Fry brought Shearer back to Birmingham in January 1994 for a fee of £50,000. Initially he failed to settle, and was soon made available for transfer, but in the 1994–95 season he came into his own. He made a major contribution to the club's winning the Second Division title and the Football League Trophy both with his tenacity and his goalscoring – ten years later, the Birmingham Evening Mail, discussing the young Darren Carter, suggested that "Blues have not had a player capable of scoring goals in that manner from central midfield since Peter Shearer". An operation on his Achilles tendon prevented him playing in the last two games of the season, when the club clinched the title, and he never played for the club's first team again.

Shearer had a trial with Notts County in 1997 before joining Peterborough United as player-coach. He played for Peterborough's reserve team, but his only appearances for the first team were three outings as an unused substitute.

== Honours ==
Birmingham City

- Football League Second Division: 1994–95
- Football League Trophy: 1994–95
