= Kenny Lowe =

English footballer and manager (born 1961)

Personal information
- Full name: Kenneth Lowe
- Date of birth: 6 November 1961 (age 64)
- Place of birth: Billingham, England
- Height: 6 ft 1 in (1.85 m)
- Position: Midfielder

Senior career*
Years	Team	Apps	(Gls)
1981–1984	Hartlepool United	54	(3)
1984–1985	Billingham Town		
1986	Spearwood Dalmatinacs		
1986–1987	Gateshead	26	(2)
1987–1990	Barrow		
1987–1988	→ Scarborough (loan)	4	(0)
1990–1993	Barnet	72	(5)
1993	Stoke City	9	(0)
1993–1996	Birmingham City	21	(3)
1994–1995	→ Carlisle United (loan)	2	(0)
1995–1996	→ Hartlepool United (loan)	13	(3)
1996	Darlington	14	(0)
1996–1998	Gateshead	91	(6)

International career
	England semi-professional	2	(0)

Managerial career
- 1997–1998: Gateshead
- 1999–2003: Barrow
- 2007–2011: Perth Glory (asst. coach)
- 2013–2018: Perth Glory
- 2018–2020: Australia (asst. coach)
- 2020–2022: Perth RedStar
- 2023: Perth Glory (interim)
- 2024–present: Perth Azzurri
- * Club domestic league appearances and goals

Kenny Lowe (born 6 November 1961) is an English football coach and former player who is the manager of Australian side Perth Azzurri.

Kenny played for ten clubs in England, and had a stint in Australia also. He later managed Gateshead and Barrow before returning to Perth to work in football, where he would undertake a five-year tenure as the manager of A-League side Perth Glory.

== Playing career ==
Lowe played for ten clubs during his career, which started on a part-time basis in 1981 with Hartlepool United, while he served an apprenticeship as a pipe-fitter and welder with ICI. He moved to Australia in 1986 to play for Spearwood Dalmatinacs in the Western Australia Premier League before returning to England. He was twice signed by manager Barry Fry, first for £40,000 for Barnet in 1991 and secondly at Birmingham City for £75,000, when at the age of 31 he turned professional. He finally ended his career at the age of 39. He also won two caps with the England semi-professional team.

== Managerial career ==
Lowe started his managerial career with Gateshead as joint manager with Matty Pearson. He returned to Barrow in 1999 when the club had just four players. He stayed at Barrow for four seasons during which time they remained in administration.

He left Barrow to move to Australia where he was appointed assistant manager at Perth Glory. He also coaches at the Football West national training centre, taking charge of the team in inter-state matches.

Following the sacking of Alistair Edwards as Perth Glory's head coach, Lowe was appointed as the caretaker coach.

On 22 April 2014 Lowe was appointed as full-time coach of Perth Glory, after winning just 4 of 17 games as caretaker coach. In his first full season in charge of the Glory he led them to the final of the 2014 FFA Cup. On 20 April 2018 Lowe was sacked as the head coach of Perth and was appointed technical director of the club's academy. Lowe departed as the Glory's longest serving A-League manager.

On 13 November 2018, Lowe was appointed as an assistant coach of the Socceroos for their friendlies in November. He continued in this role for the Socceroos' Asian Cup defence in January.

In July 2023, following the departure of Ruben Zadkovich as head coach, Lowe became interim coach of Perth Glory once again for a post-season game against West Ham United and the Australia Cup play-off against Macarthur.

== Personal life ==
He was born in Sedgefield, County Durham, and now lives in Perth, Western Australia. His sister, Kendra Slawinski, is a former England netball international.

== Career statistics ==
Club	Season	League			FA Cup		League Cup		Other		Total	
Club	Season	Division	Apps	Goals	Apps	Goals	Apps	Goals	Apps	Goals	Apps	Goals
Hartlepool United	1981–82	Fourth Division	4	0	0	0	0	0	0	0	4	0
Hartlepool United	1982–83	Fourth Division	22	1	0	0	0	0	2 (Note: Appearances in Football League Group Cup)	0	24	1
Hartlepool United	1983–84	Fourth Division	28	2	2	0	2	0	1 (Note: Appearances in Football League Trophy)	0	33	2
Hartlepool United	Total		54	3	2	0	2	0	3	0	61	3
Scarborough	1987–88	Fourth Division	4	0	0	0	0	0	0	0	4	0
Barnet	1991–92	Fourth Division	36	3	3	0	1	0	3	0	43	3
Barnet	1992–93	Third Division	36	2	2	0	1	0	1	0	40	2
Barnet	Total		72	5	5	0	2	0	4	0	83	5
Stoke City	1993–94	First Division	9	0	0	0	2	0	2 (Note: Appearances in Anglo-Italian Cup)	0	13	0
Birmingham City	1993–94	First Division	12	1	1	0	0	0	0	0	13	1
Birmingham City	1994–95	Second Division	7	2	3	0	1	0	3	0	14	2
Birmingham City	1995–96	First Division	2	0	0	0	0	0	0	0	2	0
Birmingham City	Total		21	3	4	0	1	0	3	0	29	3
Carlisle United (loan)	1994–95	Third Division	2	0	0	0	0	0	0	0	2	0
Hartlepool United (loan)	1995–96	Third Division	13	3	0	0	2	0	0	0	15	3
Darlington	1996–97	Third Division	7	0	0	0	0	0	0	0	7	0
Darlington	1997–98	Third Division	7	0	0	0	2	0	0	0	9	0
Darlington	Total		14	0	0	0	2	0	0	0	16	0
Career Total			189	14	11	0	11	0	12	0	223	14

== Managerial statistics ==
As of 21 April 2018

Team	Nat	From	To	Record				
Team	Nat	From	To	G	W	D	L	Win %
Barrow	England	August 1999	May 2003	176	78	46	52	44.32
Perth Glory	Australia	20 December 2013	20 April 2018	141	61	27	53	43.26
Total				317	139	73	105	43.85

== Honours ==
Individual

- PFA Team of the Year: 1991–92 Fourth Division, 1992–93 Third Division
