= Gary Poole =

English footballer

Personal information
- Full name: Gary John Poole
- Date of birth: 11 September 1967 (age 59)
- Place of birth: Stratford, London, England
- Height: 6 ft 0 in (1.83 m)
- Position: Right back

Youth career
- 1983–1985: Tottenham Hotspur

Senior career*
Years	Team	Apps	(Gls)
1985–1987	Tottenham Hotspur	0	(0)
1987–1989	Cambridge United	43	(0)
1989–1992	Barnet	116	(8)
1992–1993	Plymouth Argyle	39	(6)
1993–1994	Southend United	44	(2)
1994–1996	Birmingham City	72	(0)
1996–1999	Charlton Athletic	16	(1)
Total		330	(17)
- * Club domestic league appearances and goals

Gary John Poole (born 11 September 1967) is an English former professional footballer who played as a right-back. He made more than 250 appearances in the Football League, and a further 76 in the Conference.

== Life and career ==
Poole was born in Stratford, London. He came through the juniors at Tottenham Hotspur and was given a professional contract, but made no appearances for the first team and was released after two years. He signed for Fourth Division club Cambridge United, and after 18 months was sold for £3,000 to Conference side Barnet, managed by Barry Fry. In his first full season Barnet were promoted as champions to Division Four, and reached the play-offs in 1991–92.

He was then allowed to leave on a free transfer to Plymouth Argyle in the newly designated Second Division (third tier), where he captained the side. While at Plymouth he was involved in an incident which ended Rotherham United winger John Buckley's Football League career. Buckley was knocked unconscious in a clash of heads with Poole, required emergency surgery to remove a blood clot from the brain, and remained in a coma on life support for four days.

Poole spent just one season at Plymouth before Fry brought him to Southend United of Division One for a club record fee of £350,000. Another year later he joined up with Fry again, this time at Birmingham City, newly relegated to the third tier of English football, for a fee of £50,000. Success followed in 1994–95 with the Second Division championship and victory in the Football League Trophy at Wembley. The next season Poole took over the captaincy after Liam Daish was sold to Coventry City, captaining the side in the League Cup semi-final against Leeds United.

In the match against Manchester City at Maine Road in September 1996, referee Richard Poulain awarded a penalty late on; Poole, who had conceded the free kick which led to the penalty, lost control and pushed the referee from behind such that he needed treatment for whiplash after the game. The Football Association imposed an instant suspension on the player; after a hearing, the length of the ban was set at four matches. A month later manager Trevor Francis sold him to fellow First Division club Charlton Athletic for a fee of £250,000.

He played 16 games for Charlton that season, but a knee injury sustained in a reserve team match put an end to his first-team career. Still contracted to the club when they gained promotion to the Premier League the following season, he attempted a comeback in the reserves after more than a year out, but never appeared in the top flight and retired in August 1999.

A qualified coach, he became a director of a company providing investment opportunities for sportspeople.

== Honours ==
Barnet

- Conference National: 1990–91

Birmingham City

- Football League Second Division: 1994–95
- Football League Trophy: 1994–95

Individual

- PFA Team of the Year: 1994–95 Second Division
