= Ryan Price (English footballer) =

English footballer (born 1970)

Personal information
- Date of birth: 13 March 1970 (age 56)
- Place of birth: Coven, Staffordshire, England
- Position: Goalkeeper

Youth career
- Bolton Wanderers

Senior career*
Years	Team	Apps	(Gls)
1988–1994	Stafford Rangers	246	(0)
1994–1996	Birmingham City	0	(0)
1996–1999	Macclesfield Town	159	(0)
1999–2001	Telford United	58	(0)
2001–2004	Stafford Rangers		
2004–2005	Tamworth	42	(0)
2005–2006	Hinckley United	15	(0)
- * Club domestic league appearances and goals

Ryan Price (born 13 March 1970) is an English former professional footballer who played as a goalkeeper in the Football League for Macclesfield Town. He was on the books of Birmingham City, but without playing in the League, and played non-League football for Stafford Rangers, Macclesfield Town, Telford United, Tamworth and Hinckley United.

== Career ==
Price was born in Coven, near Wolverhampton, and began his football career as a trainee with Bolton Wanderers. He then joined Stafford Rangers, where he made 294 consecutive appearances beginning with his debut game in August 1988. After six seasons and 325 appearances, he joined Second Division club Birmingham City in 1994 for an initial fee of £20,000.

Price's time at Birmingham City was mostly spent as an understudy to first-choice goalkeeper Ian Bennett; his only first-team appearance came in the Associate Members' Cup in September 1994, but he received a winners' medal in that competition as an unused substitute in the final. Desire for regular football prompted a move to Macclesfield Town, where he was first choice for most of his four-year spell. Price won the 1995–96 FA Trophy with Macclesfield, and went on to change division in three consecutive seasons, winning consecutive promotions from the Football Conference and Third Division in 1996–97 and 1997–98 followed by relegation in 1998–99.

Price joined Conference club Telford United in December 1999, where he spent nearly two years before moving back to Stafford Rangers in November 2001 as player and community officer. He left Stafford for the second time in March 2004 to return to Conference football with Tamworth.

Released by Tamworth at the end of the 2004–05 season, Price signed for their local rivals Hinckley United, and made 18 appearances in all competitions before being released in September 2006.

Price was capped six times for the England semi-professional representative team.

== Honours ==
Birmingham City

- Football League Trophy: 1994–95

== Sources ==
Infobox stats

- Stafford Rangers (Conference):
- Birmingham City, Telford United:
- Macclesfield Town:
- Tamworth:
- Hinckley United:
