= Scott Hiley =

English footballer (born 1968)

Personal information
- Full name: Scott Patrick Hiley
- Date of birth: 27 September 1968 (age 58)
- Place of birth: Plymouth, England
- Height: 5 ft 9 in (1.75 m)
- Position: Right-back

Youth career
- Exeter City

Senior career*
Years	Team	Apps	(Gls)
1986–1993	Exeter City	210	(12)
1993–1996	Birmingham City	49	(0)
1996	→ Manchester City (loan)	6	(0)
1996–1998	Manchester City	3	(0)
1998	→ Southampton (loan)	1	(0)
1998–1999	Southampton	31	(0)
1999–2002	Portsmouth	75	(0)
2002	→ Exeter City (loan)	9	(0)
2002–2006	Exeter City	126	(1)
2006–2007	Crawley Town	44	(0)
2008	Tiverton Town		
2008–2009	Cullompton Rangers	8	(0)
Total		562	(13)
- * Club domestic league appearances and goals

Scott Patrick Hiley (born 27 September 1968) is an English former professional footballer who played as a defender.

He notably had brief spells in the Premier League playing for both Manchester City and Southampton, but spent the majority of his career in the Football League with Exeter City where he played over 330 times in the league over two separate spells. He also played professionally for Birmingham City, Portsmouth and later moved into non-league football with Crawley Town, Tiverton Town and Cullompton Rangers.

== Career ==
A defender, mainly at right-back, Hiley first came through the Exeter City youth system in 1986. He was a key part of Exeter's Fourth Division-winning side of 1989–90, and in 1993 he followed manager Terry Cooper to Birmingham City.

Hiley spent three injury-hit years with Birmingham, and in February 1996 was a surprise loan signing for Premier League side Manchester City. Two months later the move was made permanent, but he found first-team opportunities limited and sat in the reserves for two years as City slid down the leagues.

In August 1998 he returned to the Premiership with Southampton (where Terry Cooper was working in a scouting role), and spent 18 months there, before joining rival club Portsmouth in December 1999. He was a popular player at Portsmouth, captaining the side and winning the Player of the Year award in his first full season, but the team was not successful.

When Harry Redknapp was appointed manager in 2002, he cleared out most of the old squad and built a new team. While Portsmouth won the First Division title, Hiley returned to Exeter in November for his second spell. He was one of the club's better players in the 2002–03 season, but he could not stop the side being relegated from the Football League. He remained with Exeter after relegation and, in 2003, joined the coaching staff. He continued to be a first-team regular until October 2005. During his second spell at Exeter, Hiley played for them in the FA Cup against Manchester United and notably nutmegged Cristiano Ronaldo. In August 2004 he scored his first goal in more than 10 years as Exeter beat Northwich Victoria 2–1. Hiley left the club in February 2006 when his contract was terminated by mutual consent; he had spent over 10 years at St James Park in his two spells with the Grecians and had started almost 400 games for the club.

In August 2006, he was signed by Crawley Town after a successful pre-season trial period. He left the club after a year. In September 2008, he signed for Tiverton Town after being brought to Ladysmead by manager Martyn Rogers as cover for what had proven over the 2007 season to be an injury-jinxed right-back spot. He also featured a few times for Cullompton Rangers during the 2008–09 season.

== Personal life ==
After his professional football career ended, Hiley ran a bed and breakfast in Clyst St Mary, Devon.

== Honours ==
Exeter City

- Football League Fourth Division: 1989–90

Individual

- PFA Team of the Year: 1989–90 Fourth Division, 1991–92 Third Division, 1992–93 Second Division
