= Matthew Webb (footballer) =

English footballer

Personal information
- Full name: Matthew Leslie Webb
- Date of birth: 24 September 1976 (age 50)
- Place of birth: Bristol, England
- Height: 5 ft 8 in (1.73 m)
- Position: Winger

Youth career
- 1993–1995: Birmingham City

Senior career*
Years	Team	Apps	(Gls)
1995–1996	Birmingham City	1	(0)
- * Club domestic league appearances and goals

Matthew Leslie Webb (born 24 September 1976) is an English former professional footballer born in Bristol who played in the Football League for Birmingham City. Webb, a pacy winger, joined Birmingham City as a YTS trainee in 1993 and turned professional two years later. After playing only once for the reserve team, he made his debut in Division Two on 11 March 1995, coming on as substitute for Steve McGavin in a 1–0 defeat at home to Swansea City. He remained with the club for the 1995–96 season, but played no more first-team football before being released from his contract in 1996.
