= Gary Bull =

English footballer

Personal information
- Full name: Gary William Bull
- Date of birth: 12 June 1966 (age 60)
- Place of birth: West Bromwich, England
- Height: 5 ft 9 in (1.75 m)
- Position: Striker

Senior career*
Years	Team	Apps	(Gls)
1986–1988	Southampton	0	(0)
1988–1989	Cambridge United	19	(4)
1989–1993	Barnet	165	(91)
1993–1995	Nottingham Forest	12	(1)
1994	→ Birmingham City (loan)	10	(6)
1995	→ Brighton & Hove Albion (loan)	10	(3)
1995–1996	Birmingham City	6	(0)
1996–1998	York City	84	(11)
1998–2000	Scunthorpe United	31	(1)
2000–2003	Grantham Town	125	(68)
2003–2005	Lincoln United	?	(?)
2005–2012	Boston Town	?	(?)
- * Club domestic league appearances and goals

Gary William Bull (born 12 June 1966) is an English retired footballer. He played for many clubs, most notably Nottingham Forest, typically as a centre forward.

== Playing career ==
Having been a trainee at Southampton, Bull joined Cambridge United in March 1988.

During the 2006–07 season at Boston Town, he scored 57 goals, a club record. He later went on to become their all-time top scorer with over 200 goals, despite joining the club at the age of 39, before finally retiring from playing aged 45 in 2012.

== Personal life ==
He is the cousin of Steve Bull, the record goalscorer for Wolverhampton Wanderers.

== Honours ==
Scunthorpe United

- Football League Third Division play-offs: 1999

Individual

- PFA Team of the Year: 1991–92 Fourth Division, 1992–93 Third Division
