= Golden goal =

Tie-breaking method used in sports

The golden goal is a tie-breaking method used in association football, Australian rules football, bandy, field hockey, ice hockey, lacrosse, and rugby league to decide the winner of a match (typically a knock-out match) in which scores are tied at the end of regular time. It is a type of sudden death. Under this rule, the game ends when a goal is scored; the team that scores that goal during extra time is the winner. Formally introduced in 1993, though with some history before that, the rule ceased to apply to most FIFA-authorized football games in 2004. The similar silver goal supplemented the golden goal between 2002 and 2004.

The golden goal was played in NCAA soccer matches up to 2021, eliminated in 2022, and reinstated for post-season play in 2024. It is still used in FIH sanctioned field hockey games. A related concept, the golden point, is used in National Rugby League games. A similar golden goal rule is also used in all National Hockey League (NHL) overtime games (followed by a shootout if needed, in the regular season and preseason); however, the term "golden goal" is not used. A rule similar to the golden goal also applies in National Football League regular season games (only if a safety is scored in the first possession, or any score following the first two possessions if the game is still tied), although again the term itself is not used.

== Association football ==
=== Historical context ===
The rules of the first known organized inter-club tournament in any code of football, the English Youdan Cup (1867), featured a sudden-death rule. If scores were tied after 90 minutes, up to an hour of extra time was played, with the first team to score a goal or rouge being declared the winner. This rule came into effect in the second round tie between Norfolk FC and Broomhall FC played on 23 February 1867, when Norfolk scored a goal after two minutes of extra time to win the match, 1–0.

A similar rule was used the following year in the Cromwell Cup, which like the Youdan Cup was played under Sheffield Rules. In the final of this competition, played at Bramall Lane, Sheffield in 1868, the deciding goal was scored by the then newly formed team called The Wednesday, now known as Sheffield Wednesday.

The golden goal was introduced due to perceived failings of other means of resolving a draw (tie) in round-robin or knock-out tournaments where a winner is required. In particular, extra time periods can be tense and unentertaining as sides are too tired and nervous to attack, preferring to defend and play for penalties; whilst penalty shootouts are often described as based upon luck, and unrepresentative of football. FIFA introduced the golden goal rule in 1993. It was hoped that the golden goal would produce more attacking play during extra time, and would reduce the number of penalty shootouts.

=== FIFA competitions ===
The term golden goal was introduced by FIFA in 1993 along with the rule change because the alternative term, "sudden death", was perceived to have negative connotations. In a knockout competition, following a draw, two fifteen-minute periods of extra time are played. If either team scores a goal during extra time, the game ends immediately and the scoring team becomes the winner. The winning goal is known as the "golden goal". If there have been no goals scored after both periods of extra time, a penalty shoot-out decides the game. The golden goal was not compulsory, and individual competitions using extra time could choose whether to apply it during extra time. The first European Championship played with the rule was in 1996, as was the first MLS Cup that year; the first World Cup played with the rule was in 1998.

The first golden goal recorded was on 13 March 1993 by Australia against Uruguay in a quarter-final match of the World Youth Championship. The first major tournament final to be decided by such a goal was the 1995 Football League Trophy, where Birmingham City beat Carlisle United 1–0, with a goal from Paul Tait, followed by the 1996 European Championship final, won by Germany over the Czech Republic. The golden goal in this final was scored by Oliver Bierhoff. In MLS Cup 1996, Eddie Pope scored 3:25 into extra time as D.C. United beat the LA Galaxy 3–2. The first golden goal in World Cup history took place in 1998, as Laurent Blanc scored to enable France to defeat Paraguay in the round of 16.

In a qualification game for the 1994 Caribbean Cup, Barbados deliberately scored a late own goal in a successful attempt to qualify for the finals by forcing golden-goal extra time against Grenada, as an unusual tournament rule stated that golden goals counted double in calculating goal difference. Needing a two-goal victory to qualify, Barbados found themselves 2–1 up with three minutes left of normal time. After the Barbadians scored an own goal to bring the scoreline level at 2–2, Grenada tried to score in either net while Barbados defended both goals for the final three minutes of normal time. Barbados won the game in extra time and advanced to the next round.

In 2000, France defeated Italy in extra time in the 2000 European Championship final when David Trezeguet scored a golden goal. France thus became the first holder of both the FIFA World Cup and UEFA European Championship since West Germany in 1974.

Also in 2000, Galatasaray had a 2–1 victory over Real Madrid in the 2000 UEFA Super Cup in Stade Louis II. The 90 minutes had produced a 1–1 draw and in extra time the Brazilian player Mário Jardel scored the golden goal and won the first ever UEFA Super Cup in club history.

The following year, Liverpool overcame Deportivo Alavés in the UEFA Cup final with a golden own goal by Delfí Geli to make the score 5–4 to Liverpool.

The UEFA Champions League is one of few tournaments not to have been settled by a 'golden goal'.

The golden goal was used in the FIFA World Cup for the last time in 2002, when Turkey defeated Senegal in the quarter-finals when İlhan Mansız scored what would be the final golden goal in male tournaments. However, the 2003 Women's World Cup final was decided by a golden goal as Germany defeated Sweden 2–1 with a header by Nia Künzer in the 98th minute. It was the last golden goal in FIFA Women's World Cup history.

FIFA Men's World Cup golden goals

№	Scorer	Time	Representing	Score	Opponent	Tournament	Round	Date
1	Laurent Blanc	114'	France	1–0	Paraguay	1998	Round of 16	28 June 1998
2	Henri Camara	104'	Senegal	2–1	Sweden	2002	Round of 16	16 June 2002
3	Ahn Jung-hwan	117'	South Korea	2–1	Italy	2002	Round of 16	18 June 2002
4	İlhan Mansız	94'	Turkey	1–0	Senegal	2002	Quarter-finals	22 June 2002

FIFA Confederations Cup golden goals

№	Scorer	Time	Representing	Score	Opponent	Tournament	Round	Date
1	Harry Kewell	92'	Australia	1–0	Uruguay	1997	Semi-finals	19 December 1997
2	Cuauhtémoc Blanco	97'	Mexico	1–0	United States	1999	Semi-finals	1 August 1999
3	Thierry Henry	97'	France	1–0	Cameroon	2003	Final	29 June 2003

==== Silver goal ====
For the 2002–03 season, UEFA introduced a new rule, the silver goal, to decide a competitive match. If a team leads after the first fifteen-minute half of extra time, it is the winner, but the game no longer ends the instant a team scores like it did under golden goal. Competitions that operated extra time would be able to decide whether to use the golden goal, the silver goal, or neither procedure. The silver goal was seen as a means to "reduce the odds of a penalty shoot-out without the immediate jeopardy (and perceived unfairness) of Golden Goal" as it gave the losing team the remainder of the first fifteen-minute period of extra time to make a comeback.

On 27 August 2003, Dutch club Ajax qualified for the group stage of the 2003–04 UEFA Champions League by virtue of the silver goal against Austrian club GAK after the two legs finished 1–1 each after 90 minutes. In extra time, Ajax was able to take advantage of GAK having two players sent off when Tomáš Galásek scored from a penalty in the 103rd minute.

Less than a year later on 1 July 2004, Galásek was on the field when the silver goal was featured in the only major competitive match to be decided by a silver goal: that of the semi-final match at Euro 2004 between Greece and the Czech Republic. However, the silver goal would eliminate the Czech Republic as Traianos Dellas scored for Greece after a corner kick in the last two seconds of the first period of extra time. The Czech team had been known for their come-from-behind wins earlier in the tournament against Latvia, Netherlands, and Germany, but the extremely late Greek score left the Czechs no chance to equalize. On the other hand if the Greeks had scored at the start of either period of extra time, the Czechs would have had a decent opportunity to come back in the match. As well as being the only silver goal ever seen in an international match, it was also the only goal Dellas ever scored in his international career.

=== Abolition ===
Although both the golden goal and silver goal had their fans, both were also widely perceived as failed experiments. The golden goal in particular had not brought about more active and attacking play as originally intended and instead led to more cautious play along with furious angry reactions from a lot of players on the losing side. The silver goal, while in theory giving the remainder of the first fifteen-minute period of extra time to make a comeback, nonetheless could still effectively end the game if scored near the end of that period. Furthermore, there was also confusion about when events could choose among several different extra time rules.

In February 2004, the IFAB announced that, after Euro 2004, both the golden goal and silver goal methods would be removed from the Laws of the Game. Since the 2006 FIFA World Cup in Germany, the golden goal has never been used in the event of a drawn match during the knockout stage, as FIFA restored the previous rules: in the event of a drawn game after the regular 90 minutes, two straight 15-minute periods of extra time are played. If scores remain level, the winner is decided by a penalty shoot-out.

The golden goal rule was abolished in NCAA soccer in 2022, which then used the FIFA overtime procedure as above, but was reinstated for post-season play in 2024. The championship games of the 1995, 1996, 2002, and 2013 women's tournaments were decided by a golden goal; this situation also happened in the men's tournament in 2017, 2020, and 2025.

=== The Soccer Tournament ===
The Soccer Tournament uses a similar rule, the Elam Ending, based on their The Basketball Tournament where each match ends on a made basket, known as Target Score Time. At the start of the third period in single-gender matches (2 x 20 minute periods), or in mixed-team matches, the fifth period (4 x 9 minute periods, alternating between men and women), the leading team, or if the match is tied, both teams, enter a golden goal situation, with the number of players being reduced by one every three minutes from seven players a side to a minimum of two (with genders alternating in mixed team matches). The trailing team is not in a golden goal situation, and must tie the match before the leading team scores a goal. If they can tie the match, they enter a golden goal situation. When a team enters a golden goal situation, their next goal wins, and the match can only end on a goal.

== Other sports ==
=== Australian rules football ===
Prior to a rule change in 2016, the Australian Football League (AFL) replayed the entire AFL Grand Final if the game was tied at the end of regular time. This was known as a grand final replay and occurred three times in the AFL (1948, 1977, 2010). Because of the inconvenience of this, from the 2016 AFL season onwards drawn grand finals were then to be resolved with two five-minute periods of extra time; if the scores are still tied at the end of the extra time period, play would continues until the next score. This was removed after the 2019 season, with level scores after an initial two three-minute extra time periods to be determined instead by further periods of extra time. Golden goal was never used in the four years it was part of the rules.

=== Bandy ===
At the 2022 Women's Bandy World Championship, the final of Pool B (second division) was decided by a golden goal.

=== Field hockey ===
International field hockey tournaments such as the Hockey World Cup and Champions Trophy had used golden goals to decide the winners of elimination matches. During these matches, two extra periods of 7 1/2 minutes each were played, and if no golden goals were scored after both periods of extra time, a penalty stroke competition decided the game. FIH, the sport's governing body, did away with the overtime procedure in 2013, and now teams go directly to the shootout.

=== Ice hockey ===
The golden goal rule comes into use at the end of regulation of every National Hockey League game where the score is tied. In the regular season, five minutes of three-on-three sudden-death overtime are played, with the first goal winning the game. If, however, neither team scores after this period, a shootout determines the winner. In playoff games, shootouts are not used; 20-minute periods of five-on-five hockey are played until a goal is scored to end the game. This has resulted in extremely long contests, such as the "Easter Epic", a playoff series-deciding game which ended in the fourth overtime. The term "golden goal" is not a commonly used term in hockey; rather, the winning goal is known as an "overtime winner" or "overtime goal," while the format is known as "sudden death" in the NHL and "sudden victory" in college.

The Winter Olympics ice hockey tournament used the golden goal rule only in the gold medal game, with a 20-minute period of 5-on-5. The game ended if a goal is scored; otherwise, a penalty shootout determined the winner. This method was used to determine the 2010 men's final, where Sidney Crosby scored the game-winning goal 7:40 into overtime. As that goal won Canada the gold medal, it has become known as "The Golden Goal". Another happened at the 2014 women's final, as Marie-Philip Poulin scored at 8:10 of overtime for Canada. In both instances, the team they beat was the United States. The two teams met in the rematch four years later, and lasted the whole 20-minute overtime without a goal before the United States prevailed in a shootout for their first gold in 20 years. Jocelyne Lamoureux scored in the sixth round of the shootout while Meghan Agosta failed. Kirill Kaprizov scored at 9:40 of overtime as the Russian Olympic Committee beat Germany in the 2018 men's final. Since 2022, the overtime procedure changed to multiple 20-minute periods of 3-on-3, until one team scores, and applies to both sexes.

=== Rugby league ===
A "Golden point" system, whereby a rugby league game whose 80 minutes have ended in a draw is decided by whichever team scores the first point (by whatever means) during a period of extra time is the winner. It was first used in 1997's Super League Tri-series.

== See also ==
- Overtime (sports)
