= Peter Foakes =

English football referee

- Born: 11 September 1946
- Died: 18 September 2006 (aged 60)
- Other occupation: Teacher

Domestic
| Years | League | Role |
| 1984–1987 | English Football League | Linesman |
| 1987–1994 | English Football League | Referee |
| 1992–1994 | Premier League | Referee |
| 1994–1995 | English Football League | Referee |

Peter Foakes (11 September 1946 – 18 September 2006) was an English football referee in the Football League and Premier League. During his time on the List he was based in Clacton-on-Sea in Essex and was by profession a teacher. He is the father of England and Surrey Cricketer Ben Foakes.

== Career ==
Foakes did not become a Football League linesman until the age of thirty seven in 1984. However, it then took him just three more years to graduate to the full Referees List.

His first few years of officiating culminated in taking charge of an FA Cup quarter final at White Hart Lane between Tottenham (the eventual Cup winners) and Notts County. He officiated regularly in the former League Division One and was therefore an unsurprising choice for the new Premier League in 1992–93.

Over the next two years he handled a number of matches at Premier level. However, he was approaching retirement age and was not included on the reduced Premier League list of referees for season 1994–95. He reverted exclusively to the Football League . In April he handled the Associate Members' Cup Final between Birmingham City and Carlisle United.

He was back at Wembley at the end of May to finish his career with a significant game, as Bolton took on Reading in the Division One play-off Final for a place in the Premier League. In this match, Bolton won 4-3 after extra-time. Reading had been leading 2-0 and then missed a penalty before Bolton's comeback.

After retiring from the List he continued teaching and became one of the Football League's regional coordinators of refereeing. He died suddenly from a heart attack in September 2006.

In September 2017, Peter's son cricketer Ben Foakes was named in England's Test squad for the 2017–18 Ashes series.
