= Paul Tait (footballer, born 1971) =

English footballer

Personal information
- Full name: Paul Ronald Tait
- Date of birth: 31 July 1971 (age 55)
- Place of birth: Sutton Coldfield, England
- Height: 6 ft 1 in (1.85 m)
- Position: Midfielder

Youth career
- 1987–1988: Birmingham City

Senior career*
| Years | Team | Apps | (Gls) |
| 1988–1999 | Birmingham City | 170 | (14) |
| 1994 | → Millwall (loan) | 0 | (0) |
| 1997–1998 | → Northampton Town (loan) | 3 | (0) |
| 1999–2002 | Oxford United | 91 | (3) |
| 2002–2003 | Nea Salamis | 7 | (0) |
| Total | | 271 | (17) |
- * Club domestic league appearances and goals

Paul Ronald Tait (born 31 July 1971) is an English former professional footballer who made more than 250 appearances in the Football League.

== Club career ==
Tait was born in Sutton Coldfield, which was then part of Warwickshire. As a youth he played as a striker, but he spent most of his playing career as a midfielder. He made his first-team debut for Birmingham City as a 16-year-old substitute against Leeds United in the last match of the 1987–88 season, and turned professional a few months later.

He received media coverage during the 1995 Football League Trophy Final when, after scoring the winner, he revealed a T-shirt reading "Shit on the Villa", aimed at City's rivals Aston Villa. He was fined two weeks' wages for the incident, which was echoed in the same fixture eleven years later by Swansea City players.

Tait had loan spells with Millwall and, towards the end of his time at Birmingham, with Northampton Town. He moved on to Oxford United in January 1999, where he spent two-and-a-half years. He also played for the Cypriot team Nea Salamis.

== Honours ==
Birmingham City

- Football League Second Division: 1994–95
- Football League Trophy: 1994–95
