= 1994–95 Football League =

96th season of the Football League

The Football League
- Season: 1994–95
- Champions: Middlesbrough
- Promoted: Middlesbrough; Bolton Wanderers

The 1994–95 Football League season was the 96th completed season of The Football League. It was the third season of The Football League since the formation of the Premier League. For sponsorship reasons, the league was known as the Endsleigh League.

== Overview ==
The reduction of the Premier League from 22 teams to 20, to take effect from the 1995–96 season, meant that just two teams would be promoted from the First Division in 1995: the champions and the play-off winners. Middlesbrough were the champions, in their first season under Bryan Robson. Reading finished second but had to settle for the play-offs, losing in the final to Bolton Wanderers – who achieved their second promotion in three years under Bruce Rioch, as well as finishing runners-up to Liverpool in the League Cup.

1995 also saw four teams relegated from the First Division, with Burnley, Bristol City and Notts County being joined by Swindon Town, who suffered a second straight relegation. Sunderland narrowly avoided the drop following the arrival of enthusiastic new manager Peter Reid, who over the next few years would bring dramatic improvements to the fortunes of the Wearsiders.

The Second Division would also see only the champions and the play-off winners promoted, while five teams would be relegated. Birmingham City were the champions, returning to the First Division at the first time of asking; they also won the Football League Trophy to complete a "lower-league Double". Huddersfield Town were the play-off winners, defeating second-placed Brentford on penalties before beating Bristol Rovers in the final. The five teams relegated were Cambridge United, Plymouth Argyle, Cardiff City, Chester City and Leyton Orient.

In the Third Division, three teams would be promoted instead of the usual four: the champions, the runners-up and the play-off winners. Carlisle United were the champions and Walsall the runners-up, while Chesterfield won the play-offs, defeating Bury in the final. Exeter City, in severe financial trouble, finished bottom, but held on to their league status as Conference champions Macclesfield Town were unable to meet the league's stadium capacity requirements.

== Final league tables and results ==
The tables and results below are reproduced here in the exact form that they can be found at The Rec.Sport.Soccer Statistics Foundation website. Play-off results are from the same website.

== First Division ==
First Division
- Season: 1994–95
- Champions: Middlesbrough
- Promoted: Middlesbrough; Bolton Wanderers
- Relegated: Swindon Town; Burnley; Bristol City; Notts County
- Matches: 552
- Goals: 1,389 (2.52 per match)
- Top goalscorer: John Aldridge (24 goals)

With the reduction of the Premier League from 22 to 20 clubs for the 1995–96 season, there would be just two promotion places from Division One in the 1994–95 season, as well as a fourth relegation place instead of the usual three.

Middlesbrough clinched the division's only automatic promotion place by finishing champions in their first season under player-manager Bryan Robson, with promotion being clinched in the final game at Ayresome Park at the end of April. After 92 years at their historic home, the club would be relocated to the new 30,000-seater Riverside Stadium over the summer of 1995.

Runners-up Reading, another club planning to build a new stadium in the near future, would normally have won automatic promotion, but the latest restructuring of the league meant that they had to navigate a play-off semi-final with fifth-placed Tranmere Rovers. They easily overcame the Wirral side, whose veteran striker John Aldridge topped the Division One goal charts with 24 league strikes, but then had to take on Bolton Wanderers in a Wembley clash. The Royals were still 2–0 ahead and looking set to reach the top flight for the first time ever with more than hour left on the clock, but then Bolton pulled a goal back in the 75th minute and followed this with an equaliser to force extra time, and the Burnden Park side ended up winning a dramatic match 4–3 and ending their 15-year absence from the top flight. However, they were faced with having to fight for Premier League survival in 1995–96 without their manager Bruce Rioch, who left to manage Arsenal over the summer and was succeeded by joint managers Roy McFarland and Colin Todd.

A number of Division One sides enjoyed memorable runs in the FA Cup and League Cup. Weeks before their dramatic playoff triumph, Bolton Wanderers had travelled to Wembley for their first major cup final in 37 years, to take on Liverpool in the final of the League Cup, but lost 2–1 to the Merseysiders. Wolves, who went on to lose to Bolton in the playoff semi-finals, had held Crystal Palace to a 1–1 draw in their FA Cup quarter-final at Selhurst Park and had high hopes of a semi-final tie with Manchester United, only to lose the replay 4–1 at home to the South London side.

At the other end of the table, Swindon Town quickly found themselves battling against a second successive relegation, having been relegated from the Premier League in 1993–94. Their manager John Gorman was sacked in November and replaced by 33-year-old Manchester City midfielder Steve McMahon as player-manager. The Wiltshire club's new manager was able to guide Swindon to the semi-finals of the League Cup, but he was unable to guide them to Division One survival, as they went down in the fourth and final relegation place along with Burnley, Bristol City, and Notts County.

During this season, a number of Division One clubs had a new stadium in the pipeline. Middlesbrough were preparing for their move from Ayresome Park to the new Riverside Stadium, while their local rivals Sunderland had identified a former colliery site on the banks of the River Wear as their preferred site for a new all-seater stadium after nearly 100 years at Roker Park. Bolton Wanderers, who went up alongside Middlesbrough, were aiming for a new 25,000-seater stadium at Lostock to replace Burnden Park. Beaten playoff finalists Reading had lined up a site on the southern side of the town as the site of a replacement for antiquated Elm Park, while Luton Town's new owner Simon Kohler unveiled ambitious plans to build a new 20,000-seater indoor stadium, the latest in a string of proposals which had emerged over the last 40 years as possible replacements for the cramped stadium at Kenilworth Road.

Derby County, who missed out on the playoffs, were planning to rebuild the Baseball Ground as a 26,000-seater stadium, after considering relocating to a new site at Pride Park.

Pos	Team	Pld	W	D	L	GF	GA	GD	Pts	Qualification or relegation
1	Middlesbrough (C, P)	46	23	13	10	67	40	+27	82	Promotion to the Premier League
2	Reading	46	23	10	13	58	44	+14	79	Qualification for the First Division play-offs
3	Bolton Wanderers (O, P)	46	21	14	11	67	45	+22	77	Qualification for the First Division play-offs
4	Wolverhampton Wanderers	46	21	13	12	77	61	+16	76	Qualification for the First Division play-offs
5	Tranmere Rovers	46	22	10	14	67	58	+9	76	Qualification for the First Division play-offs
6	Barnsley	46	20	12	14	63	52	+11	72	
7	Watford	46	19	13	14	52	46	+6	70	
8	Sheffield United	46	17	17	12	74	55	+19	68	
9	Derby County	46	18	12	16	66	51	+15	66	
10	Grimsby Town	46	17	14	15	62	56	+6	65	
11	Stoke City	46	16	15	15	50	53	−3	63	
12	Millwall	46	16	14	16	60	60	0	62	
13	Southend United	46	18	8	20	54	73	−19	62	
14	Oldham Athletic	46	16	13	17	60	60	0	61	
15	Charlton Athletic	46	16	11	19	58	66	−8	59	
16	Luton Town	46	15	13	18	61	64	−3	58	
17	Port Vale	46	15	13	18	58	64	−6	58	
18	Portsmouth	46	15	13	18	53	63	−10	58	
19	West Bromwich Albion	46	16	10	20	51	57	−6	58	
20	Sunderland	46	12	18	16	41	45	−4	54	
21	Swindon Town (R)	46	12	12	22	54	73	−19	48	Relegation to the Second Division
22	Burnley (R)	46	11	13	22	49	74	−25	46	Relegation to the Second Division
23	Bristol City (R)	46	11	12	23	42	63	−21	45	Relegation to the Second Division
24	Notts County (R)	46	9	13	24	45	66	−21	40	Relegation to the Second Division

Rules for classification: 1) Points; 2) Goals scored; 3) Goal difference
(C) Champions; (O) Play-off winners; (P) Promoted; (R) Relegated

=== Play-offs ===
Semi-finals; 1st leg – 14 May; 2nd leg – 17 May 1995
2	Reading	3	0	3
5	Tranmere Rovers	1	0	1
3	Bolton Wanderers	1	2	3
4	Wolverhampton Wanderers	2	0	2

Final at Wembley; 29 May 1995
2	Reading	3
3	Bolton Wanderers (a.e.t.)	4

=== Results ===
Home \ Away	BAR	BOL	BRI	BUR	CHA	DER	GRI	LUT	MID	MIL	NTC	OLD	POR	PTV	REA	SHU	STD	STK	SUN	SWI	TRA	WAT	WBA	WOL
Barnsley		3–0	2–1	2–0	2–1	2–1	4–1	3–1	1–1	4–1	1–1	1–1	1–0	3–1	0–2	2–1	0–0	2–0	2–0	2–1	2–2	0–0	2–0	1–3
Bolton Wanderers	2–1		0–2	1–1	5–1	1–0	3–3	0–0	1–0	1–0	2–0	2–2	1–1	1–0	1–0	1–1	3–0	4–0	1–0	3–0	1–0	3–0	1–0	5–1
Bristol City	3–2	0–1		1–1	2–1	0–2	1–2	2–2	0–1	1–0	2–1	2–2	1–1	0–0	1–2	2–1	0–0	3–1	0–0	3–2	0–1	0–0	1–0	1–5
Burnley	0–1	2–2	1–1		2–0	3–1	0–2	2–1	0–3	1–2	2–1	2–1	1–2	4–3	1–2	4–2	5–1	1–1	1–1	1–2	1–1	1–1	1–1	0–1
Charlton Athletic	2–2	1–2	3–2	1–2		3–4	2–1	1–0	0–2	1–1	1–0	2–0	1–0	1–1	1–2	1–1	3–1	0–0	1–0	1–0	0–1	3–0	1–1	3–2
Derby County	1–0	2–1	3–1	4–0	2–2		2–1	0–0	0–1	3–2	0–0	2–1	3–0	2–0	1–2	2–3	1–2	3–0	0–1	3–1	5–0	1–1	1–1	3–3
Grimsby Town	1–0	3–3	1–0	2–2	0–1	0–1		5–0	2–1	1–0	2–1	1–3	2–0	4–1	1–0	0–0	4–1	0–0	3–1	1–1	3–1	0–0	0–2	0–0
Luton Town	0–1	0–3	0–1	0–1	0–1	0–0	1–2		5–1	1–1	2–0	2–1	2–0	2–1	0–1	3–6	2–2	2–3	3–0	3–0	2–0	1–1	1–1	3–3
Middlesbrough	1–1	1–0	3–0	2–0	1–0	2–4	1–1	2–1		3–0	2–1	2–1	4–0	3–0	0–1	1–1	1–2	2–1	2–2	3–1	0–1	2–0	2–1	1–0
Millwall	0–1	0–1	1–1	2–3	3–1	4–1	2–0	0–0	0–0		0–0	1–1	2–2	1–3	2–0	2–1	3–1	1–1	2–0	3–1	2–1	2–1	2–2	1–0
Notts County	1–3	1–1	1–1	3–0	3–3	0–0	0–2	0–1	1–1	0–1		1–3	0–1	2–2	1–0	2–1	2–2	0–2	3–2	0–1	1–0	1–0	2–0	1–1
Oldham Athletic	1–0	3–1	2–0	3–0	5–2	1–0	1–0	0–0	1–0	0–1	1–1		3–2	3–2	1–3	3–3	0–2	0–0	0–0	1–1	0–0	0–2	1–0	4–1
Portsmouth	3–0	1–1	0–0	2–0	1–1	0–1	2–1	3–2	0–0	3–2	2–1	1–1		0–2	1–1	1–0	1–1	0–1	1–4	4–3	1–1	2–1	1–2	1–2
Port Vale	2–1	1–1	2–1	1–0	0–2	1–0	1–2	0–1	2–1	2–1	1–1	3–1	1–0		0–2	0–2	5–0	1–1	0–0	2–2	2–0	0–1	1–0	2–4
Reading	0–3	2–1	1–0	0–0	2–1	1–0	1–1	0–0	1–1	0–0	2–0	2–1	0–0	3–3		1–0	2–0	4–0	0–2	3–0	1–3	4–1	0–2	4–2
Sheffield United	0–0	3–1	3–0	2–0	2–1	2–1	3–1	1–3	1–1	1–1	1–3	2–0	3–1	1–1	1–1		2–0	1–1	0–0	2–2	2–0	3–0	2–0	3–3
Southend United	3–1	2–1	2–1	3–1	2–1	1–0	0–0	3–0	0–2	0–1	1–0	1–0	1–2	1–2	4–1	1–3		4–2	0–1	2–0	0–0	0–4	2–1	0–1
Stoke City	0–0	1–1	2–1	2–0	3–2	0–0	3–0	1–2	1–1	4–3	2–1	0–1	0–2	0–1	0–1	1–1	4–1		0–1	0–0	1–0	1–0	4–1	1–1
Sunderland	2–0	1–1	2–0	0–0	1–1	1–1	2–2	1–1	0–1	1–1	1–2	0–0	2–2	1–1	0–1	1–0	0–1	1–0		1–0	0–1	1–3	2–2	1–1
Swindon Town	0–0	0–1	0–3	1–1	0–1	1–1	3–2	1–2	2–1	1–2	3–0	3–1	0–2	2–0	1–0	1–3	2–2	0–1	1–0		2–2	1–0	0–0	3–2
Tranmere Rovers	6–1	1–0	2–0	4–1	1–1	3–1	2–0	4–2	1–1	3–1	3–2	3–1	4–2	1–1	1–0	2–1	0–2	0–1	1–0	3–2		2–1	3–1	1–1
Watford	3–2	0–0	1–0	2–0	2–0	2–1	0–0	2–4	1–1	1–0	3–1	1–2	2–0	3–2	2–2	0–0	1–0	0–0	0–1	2–0	2–0		1–0	2–1
West Bromwich Albion	2–1	1–0	1–0	1–0	0–1	0–0	1–1	1–0	1–3	3–0	3–2	3–1	0–2	0–0	2–0	1–0	2–0	1–3	1–3	2–5	5–1	0–1		2–0
Wolverhampton Wanderers	0–0	3–1	2–0	2–0	2–0	0–2	2–1	2–3	0–2	3–3	1–0	2–1	1–0	2–1	1–0	2–2	5–0	2–0	1–0	1–1	2–0	1–1	2–0	

Legend: Blue = home team win; Yellow = draw; Red = away team win.

=== Top scorers ===
Rank	Player	Club	Goals
1	(Republic of Ireland) John Aldridge	Tranmere Rovers	24
2	(Norway) Jan Aage Fjortoft	Swindon Town	19
3	(Scotland) Gerry Creaney	Portsmouth	18
=	(Wales) Sean McCarthy	Oldham Athletic	18
=	(England) David Whyte	Charlton Athletic	18
6	(Wales) Nathan Blake	Sheffield United	17
7	(England) Martin Foyle	Port Vale	16
=	(England) Chris Malkin	Tranmere Rovers	16
=	(Scotland) John McGinlay	Bolton Wanderers	16
=	(England) Steve Bull	Wolverhampton Wanderers	16
11	(Scotland) John Hendrie	Middlesbrough	15
=	(Republic of Ireland) David Kelly	Wolverhampton Wanderers	15

=== Locations ===
Locations of the First Division teams
Locations of the London-based First Division teams

=== Attendances ===
#	Club	Average
1	Wolverhampton Wanderers	25,940
2	Middlesbrough	18,702
3	Sunderland	15,344
4	West Bromwich Albion	15,200
5	Sheffield United	14,462
6	Derby County	13,589
7	Bolton Wanderers	13,029
8	Stoke City	12,910
9	Burnley	12,063
10	Charlton Athletic	10,211
11	Swindon Town	9,744
12	Reading	9,350
13	Port Vale	9,174
14	Tranmere Rovers	8,906
15	Oldham Athletic	8,444
16	Portsmouth	8,269
17	Watford	8,125
18	Bristol City	8,005
19	Millwall	7,685
20	Luton Town	7,350
21	Notts County	7,195
22	Barnsley	6,509
23	Grimsby Town	5,921
24	Southend United	5,146

== Second Division ==
Following relegation from Division One at the end of the 1993–94 season, Birmingham City earned an instant return as Second Division champions, also lifting the Auto Windscreens Shield. The latest restructuring of the league meant that runners-up Brentford missed out on automatic promotion and had to contest the play-offs, where they were beaten on penalties by Huddersfield Town after drawing both legs of their semi-final 1-1. The other semi-final saw Bristol Rovers overcome Crewe Alexandra, ending the Cheshire club's chances of a second successive promotion. The Wembley showdown saw Huddersfield Town beat the West Country side 2–1 to clinch a return to the second tier after seven seasons of trying, rounding off a fine first season at Huddersfield's impressive new all-seater McAlpine Stadium.

Wycombe Wanderers finished sixth in Division Two and missed out on the play-offs – and the chance of a third successive promotion – but this didn't deter Norwich City (just relegated from the Premier League) from recruiting Martin O'Neill as their new manager.

At the bottom of the table, Leyton Orient were relegated after six seasons in the third tier, having not won an away game in the league since before Christmas 1993. Just before the end of the season, the Brisbane Road club was taken over by Barry Hearn, who was swift to sack joint managers John Sitton and Chris Turner, appointing Pat Holland in their place. Chester City suffered an instant return to Division Three as they finished second from bottom. Cardiff City went down to Division Three just two seasons after winning promotion. Plymouth Argyle, promotion contenders a season earlier, went down in 21st place. The fifth and final relegation place went to a Cambridge United side who had been on the brink of a place in the new Premier League just three years earlier.

As Huddersfield were settling into their new home after more than 80 years at Leeds Road, a number of other Division Two clubs were planning to follow the growing trend of moving to a completely new stadium. Just before Christmas, Bristol Rovers announced plans to build a new 20,000-seater stadium at Avonmouth as part of their ambitious plan to end their long search for a permanent new home which had started when they moved out of their home at Eastville in 1986. Blackpool were also looking at possible sites to build a new all-seater stadium to replace Bloomfield Road. Shortly after the end of the season, Oxford United announced plans to build a new 16,000-seater stadium near Blackbird Leys to replace the dilapidated Manor Ground.

Football League, Second Division
- Season: 1994–95
- Champions: Birmingham City (1st third tier title)
- Direct promotion: Birmingham City
- Promoted through play-offs: Huddersfield Town
- Relegated: Cambridge United, Cardiff City, Chester, Leyton Orient, Plymouth Argyle
- Matches: 552
- Goals: 1,441 (2.61 per match)
- Top goalscorer: Gary Bennett (Wrexham), 29

Pos	Team	Pld	W	D	L	GF	GA	GD	Pts	Promotion or relegation
1	Birmingham City (C, P)	46	25	14	7	84	37	+47	89	Promotion to the First Division
2	Brentford	46	25	10	11	81	39	+42	85	Qualification for the Second Division play-offs
3	Crewe Alexandra	46	25	8	13	80	68	+12	83	Qualification for the Second Division play-offs
4	Bristol Rovers	46	22	16	8	70	40	+30	82	Qualification for the Second Division play-offs
5	Huddersfield Town (O, P)	46	22	15	9	79	49	+30	81	Qualification for the Second Division play-offs
6	Wycombe Wanderers	46	21	15	10	60	46	+14	78	
7	Oxford United	46	21	12	13	66	52	+14	75	
8	Hull City	46	21	11	14	70	57	+13	74	
9	York City	46	21	9	16	67	51	+16	72	
10	Swansea City	46	19	14	13	57	45	+12	71	
11	Stockport County	46	19	8	19	63	60	+3	65	
12	Blackpool	46	18	10	18	64	70	−6	64	
13	Wrexham	46	16	15	15	65	64	+1	63	Qualification for the Cup Winners' Cup qualifying round
14	Bradford City	46	16	12	18	57	64	−7	60	
15	Peterborough United	46	14	18	14	54	69	−15	60	
16	Brighton & Hove Albion	46	14	17	15	54	53	+1	59	
17	Rotherham United	46	14	14	18	57	61	−4	56	
18	Shrewsbury Town	46	13	14	19	54	62	−8	53	
19	Bournemouth	46	13	11	22	49	69	−20	50	
20	Cambridge United (R)	46	11	15	20	52	69	−17	48	Relegation to the Third Division
21	Plymouth Argyle (R)	46	12	10	24	45	83	−38	46	Relegation to the Third Division
22	Cardiff City (R)	46	9	11	26	46	74	−28	38	Relegation to the Third Division
23	Chester City (R)	46	6	11	29	37	84	−47	29	Relegation to the Third Division
24	Leyton Orient (R)	46	6	8	32	30	75	−45	26	Relegation to the Third Division

(C) Champions; (O) Play-off winners; (P) Promoted; (R) Relegated

=== Play-offs ===
Semi-finals; 1st leg – 14 May; 2nd leg – 17 May 1995
2nd	Brentford	1	1	2 (3)
5th	Huddersfield Town (pen.)	1	1	2 (4)
3rd	Crewe Alexandra	0	1	1
4th	Bristol Rovers (away goals)	0	1	1

Final at Wembley; 28 May 1995
4th	Bristol Rovers	1
5th	Huddersfield Town	2

=== Results ===
Home \ Away	BOU	BIR	BLP	BRA	BRE	B&HA	BRR	CAM	CAR	CHR	CRE	HUD	HUL	LEY	OXF	PET	PLY	ROT	SHR	STP	SWA	WRE	WYC	YOR
AFC Bournemouth		2–1	1–2	2–3	0–1	0–3	2–0	1–0	3–2	1–1	1–1	0–2	2–3	2–0	0–2	0–3	0–0	1–1	3–0	2–0	3–2	1–3	2–0	1–4
Birmingham City	0–0		7–1	0–0	2–0	3–3	2–0	1–1	2–1	1–0	5–0	1–1	2–2	2–0	3–0	4–0	4–2	2–1	2–0	1–0	0–1	5–2	0–1	4–2
Blackpool	3–1	1–1		2–0	1–2	2–2	0–2	2–3	2–1	3–1	0–0	1–4	1–2	2–1	2–1	4–0	5–2	2–2	2–1	1–2	2–1	2–1	0–1	0–5
Bradford City	1–2	1–1	0–1		1–0	2–1	2–1	1–1	2–3	1–1	0–2	3–4	1–0	2–0	0–2	4–2	2–0	0–3	1–1	1–2	1–3	1–1	2–1	0–0
Brentford	1–2	1–2	3–2	4–3		2–1	3–0	6–0	2–0	1–1	2–0	0–0	0–1	3–0	2–0	0–1	7–0	2–0	1–0	1–0	0–0	0–2	0–0	3–0
Brighton & Hove Albion	0–0	0–1	2–2	1–0	1–1		1–2	2–0	0–0	1–0	0–1	0–0	1–0	1–0	1–1	1–2	1–1	1–1	2–1	2–0	1–1	4–0	1–1	1–0
Bristol Rovers	2–1	1–1	0–0	4–0	2–2	3–0		2–1	2–2	3–0	2–2	1–1	0–2	1–0	3–2	3–1	2–0	2–0	4–0	2–2	1–0	4–2	1–0	3–1
Cambridge United	2–2	1–0	0–0	4–1	0–0	0–2	1–1		2–0	2–1	1–2	1–1	2–2	0–0	1–2	2–0	1–1	2–1	3–1	3–4	1–3	1–2	2–2	1–0
Cardiff City	1–1	0–1	0–1	2–4	2–3	3–0	0–1	3–1		2–1	1–2	0–0	0–2	2–1	1–3	1–2	0–1	1–1	1–2	1–1	1–1	0–0	2–0	1–2
Chester	1–1	0–4	2–0	1–4	1–4	1–2	0–0	1–3	0–2		0–1	1–2	1–2	1–0	2–0	1–1	1–0	4–4	1–3	1–0	2–2	1–1	0–2	0–4
Crewe Alexandra	2–0	2–1	4–3	0–1	0–2	4–0	2–1	4–2	0–0	2–1		3–3	3–2	3–0	3–2	1–3	2–2	3–1	1–0	2–1	1–2	1–3	1–2	2–1
Huddersfield Town	3–1	1–2	1–1	0–0	1–0	3–0	1–1	3–1	5–1	5–1	1–2		1–1	2–1	3–3	1–2	2–0	1–0	2–1	2–1	2–0	2–1	0–1	3–0
Hull City	3–1	0–0	1–0	2–0	1–2	2–2	0–2	1–0	4–0	2–0	7–1	1–0		2–0	3–1	1–1	2–0	0–2	2–2	0–0	0–2	3–2	0–0	3–0
Leyton Orient	3–2	2–1	0–1	0–0	0–2	0–3	1–2	1–1	2–0	2–0	1–4	0–2	1–1		1–1	4–1	0–2	0–0	2–1	0–1	0–1	1–1	0–1	0–1
Oxford United	0–3	1–1	3–2	1–0	1–1	0–0	0–0	1–0	1–0	1–0	2–1	3–1	4–0	3–2		1–0	1–0	2–1	0–0	4–0	1–2	0–0	0–2	0–2
Peterborough United	0–0	1–1	1–0	0–0	2–2	2–1	0–0	2–2	2–1	2–0	1–5	2–2	2–1	0–0	1–4		1–2	2–2	1–1	0–1	1–0	1–0	1–3	1–1
Plymouth Argyle	0–1	1–3	0–2	1–5	1–5	0–3	1–1	0–0	0–0	1–0	3–2	0–3	2–1	1–0	1–1	0–1		0–0	1–0	0–2	2–1	4–1	2–2	1–2
Rotherham United	4–0	1–1	0–2	3–1	0–2	4–3	0–3	1–0	2–0	2–0	2–2	1–1	2–0	2–0	1–1	0–0	3–1		0–4	1–0	3–3	0–1	2–0	2–1
Shrewsbury Town	3–0	0–2	0–0	1–2	2–1	1–1	1–0	1–1	0–1	1–0	1–2	2–1	2–3	3–0	1–1	2–2	3–2	1–0		1–1	3–3	2–2	2–2	1–0
Stockport County	1–0	0–1	3–2	1–2	0–1	2–0	2–1	2–1	4–1	2–2	3–1	1–2	4–0	2–1	0–2	1–1	2–4	1–0	2–1		0–1	1–1	4–1	2–3
Swansea City	1–0	0–2	1–0	0–0	0–2	1–1	0–0	1–0	4–1	0–1	0–1	1–1	2–0	2–0	1–3	2–0	3–0	1–0	0–0	2–0		0–0	1–1	0–0
Wrexham	2–0	1–1	0–1	0–1	0–0	2–1	1–1	0–1	0–3	2–2	1–0	1–2	2–2	4–1	3–2	3–3	3–1	3–1	0–1	1–0	4–1		4–1	1–1
Wycombe Wanderers	1–1	0–3	1–1	3–1	4–3	0–0	0–0	3–0	3–1	3–1	0–0	2–1	1–2	2–1	1–0	3–1	1–2	2–0	1–0	1–1	1–0	3–0		0–0
York City	1–0	2–0	4–0	0–0	2–1	1–0	0–3	2–0	1–1	2–0	1–2	3–0	3–1	4–1	0–2	1–1	1–0	2–0	3–0	2–4	2–4	0–1	0–0	

Legend: Blue = home team win; Yellow = draw; Red = away team win.

=== Top scorers ===
Rank	Player	Club	Goals
1	(England) Gary Bennett	Wrexham	29
2	(England) Andy Booth	Huddersfield Town	28
3	(England) Nicky Forster	Brentford	25
4	(England) Robert Taylor	Brentford	23
5	(England) Steve Claridge	Birmingham City	20
=	(England) Paul Moody	Oxford United	20

=== Locations ===
Locations of the Second Division teams
Locations of the London-based Second Division teams

== Third Division ==
Under the ambitious ownership of Michael Knighton, the man who had unsuccessfully tried to take over Manchester United in 1989, Carlisle United clinched the Division Three title by a comfortable margin, ending their eight-year tenure in the league's basement division. Walsall, under new manager Chris Nicholl, achieved promotion as runners-up after five seasons at this level. Chesterfield ended their six-year spell in the fourth tier by triumphing over Bury in the playoff final, while the previous season's finalists Preston North End were beaten by the Greater Manchester club in the semi-final, and Mansfield lost to their East Midlands rivals Chesterfield in the other semi-final.

At the bottom end of the table, Exeter City not only found their league status under threat, but also their very existence. The Devon club, relegated from Division Two the previous season, went into liquidation in November and were only saved from going under when a takeover deal was approved. They still finished bottom of the league, level on points with Scarborough, but were saved from dropping into the Conference by the fact that Macclesfield Town's Moss Rose ground did not meet Football League requirements.

Northampton Town, whose league status had been saved in similar fashion the previous season, were on the move to a new stadium in October when they bade farewell to the County Ground and moved into the new Sixfields Stadium.

As the season ended, three Division Three clubs had their future secured by takeover deals. Preston North End were taken over by local heating firm Baxi, who were quick to replace John Beck with Gary Peters as manager. Debt-ridden Gillingham were saved from the threat of closure by new owner Paul Scally, who appointed Tony Pulis as manager of Kent's only current Football League club. Wigan Athletic were taken over by JJB tycoon Dave Whelan, a former Blackburn Rovers player, who appointed John Deehan as the club's new manager and had plans to build a new all-seater stadium to replace Wigan's current home at Springfield Park.

Football League, Third Division
- Season: 1994–95
- Champions: Carlisle United (1st fourth tier title)
- Direct promotion: Carlisle United, Walsall
- Promoted through play-offs: Chesterfield
- Relegated to Conference: None
- Matches: 462
- Goals: 1,229 (2.66 per match)
- Top goalscorer: Dougie Freedman (Barnet), 24

Pos	Team	Pld	W	D	L	GF	GA	GD	Pts	Promotion or relegation
1	Carlisle United (C, P)	42	27	10	5	67	31	+36	91	Promotion to the Second Division
2	Walsall (P)	42	24	11	7	75	40	+35	83	Promotion to the Second Division
3	Chesterfield (O, P)	42	23	12	7	62	37	+25	81	Qualification for the Third Division play-offs
4	Bury	42	23	11	8	73	36	+37	80	Qualification for the Third Division play-offs
5	Preston North End	42	19	10	13	58	41	+17	67	Qualification for the Third Division play-offs
6	Mansfield Town	42	18	11	13	84	59	+25	65	Qualification for the Third Division play-offs
7	Scunthorpe United	42	18	8	16	68	63	+5	62	
8	Fulham	42	16	14	12	60	54	+6	62	
9	Doncaster Rovers	42	17	10	15	58	43	+15	61	
10	Colchester United	42	16	10	16	56	64	−8	58	
11	Barnet	42	15	11	16	56	63	−7	56	
12	Lincoln City	42	15	11	16	54	55	−1	56	
13	Torquay United	42	14	13	15	54	57	−3	55	
14	Wigan Athletic	42	14	10	18	53	60	−7	52	
15	Rochdale	42	12	14	16	44	67	−23	50	
16	Hereford United	42	12	13	17	45	62	−17	49	
17	Northampton Town	42	10	14	18	45	67	−22	44	
18	Hartlepool United	42	11	10	21	43	69	−26	43	
19	Gillingham	42	10	11	21	46	64	−18	41	
20	Darlington	42	11	8	23	43	57	−14	41	
21	Scarborough	42	8	10	24	49	70	−21	34	
22	Exeter City	42	8	10	24	36	70	−34	34	Reprieved from relegation (Note: Financially troubled Exeter City retained their league status due to Conference champions Macclesfield Town lacking a stadium adequate for Football League capacity standards.)

(C) Champions; (O) Play-off winners; (P) Promoted

=== Play-offs ===
Semi-finals; 1st leg – 14 May; 2nd leg – 17 May 1995
3rd	Chesterfield (a.e.t.)	1	5	6
6th	Mansfield Town	1	2	3
4th	Bury	1	1	2
5th	Preston North End	0	0	0

Final at Wembley; 27 May 1995
3rd	Chesterfield	2
4th	Bury	0

=== Results ===
Home \ Away	BAR	BRY	CRL	CHF	COL	DAR	DON	EXE	FUL	GIL	HAR	HER	LIN	MAN	NOR	PNE	ROC	SCA	SCU	TOR	WAL	WIG
Barnet		1–1	0–2	4–1	0–1	2–3	0–0	1–1	0–0	1–0	4–0	2–2	2–1	2–2	2–3	2–1	6–2	3–1	1–2	2–0	1–3	1–1
Bury	3–0		2–0	2–1	4–1	2–1	2–0	0–0	0–0	3–2	2–0	1–1	2–0	2–2	5–0	0–0	0–1	1–0	2–0	3–1	0–0	3–3
Carlisle United	4–0	3–0		1–1	0–0	2–1	1–1	1–0	1–1	2–0	0–1	1–0	1–3	2–1	2–1	0–0	4–1	2–0	2–1	1–0	2–1	2–1
Chesterfield	2–0	0–0	1–2		2–2	0–0	2–0	2–0	1–1	2–0	2–0	1–0	1–0	0–1	3–0	1–0	2–2	0–1	3–1	1–0	0–0	0–0
Colchester United	1–1	1–0	0–1	0–3		1–0	0–3	3–1	5–2	2–2	1–0	2–2	1–2	1–1	0–1	3–1	0–0	0–2	4–2	1–3	3–2	0–1
Darlington	0–1	0–2	0–2	0–1	2–3		0–2	2–0	0–0	2–0	1–2	3–1	0–0	0–0	4–1	0–0	4–0	1–0	1–3	2–1	2–2	1–3
Doncaster Rovers	1–1	1–2	0–0	1–3	1–2	0–0		1–0	0–0	1–2	3–0	3–0	3–0	0–2	1–0	2–1	0–1	1–0	1–1	3–0	0–2	5–3
Exeter City	1–2	0–4	1–1	1–2	1–0	0–2	1–5		0–1	3–0	2–1	1–1	1–0	2–3	0–0	0–1	0–0	5–2	2–2	1–2	1–3	2–4
Fulham	4–0	1–0	1–3	1–1	1–2	3–1	0–2	4–0		1–0	1–0	1–1	1–1	4–2	4–4	0–1	5–0	1–2	1–0	2–1	1–1	2–0
Gillingham	2–1	1–1	0–1	1–1	1–3	2–1	4–2	3–0	4–1		0–0	0–0	0–0	0–2	3–1	2–3	1–1	3–1	2–2	1–0	1–3	0–1
Hartlepool United	0–1	3–1	1–5	0–2	3–1	1–0	2–1	2–2	1–2	2–0		4–0	0–3	3–2	1–1	3–1	1–0	3–3	1–4	1–1	1–1	0–1
Hereford United	3–2	1–0	0–1	0–2	3–0	0–0	0–1	3–0	1–1	2–1	1–0		0–3	0–0	2–1	0–2	0–0	2–1	2–1	1–1	0–0	1–2
Lincoln City	1–2	0–3	1–1	0–1	2–0	3–1	1–0	2–0	2–0	1–1	3–0	2–0		3–2	2–2	1–1	2–2	2–0	3–3	1–2	1–1	1–0
Mansfield Town	3–0	0–2	1–2	4–2	2–0	0–1	0–1	1–1	1–1	4–0	2–0	7–1	6–2		1–1	1–2	1–1	3–2	1–0	2–2	1–3	4–3
Northampton Town	1–1	0–5	2–1	2–3	1–1	2–1	0–0	2–1	0–1	2–0	1–1	1–3	3–1	0–1		2–1	1–2	0–3	0–1	2–0	2–2	1–0
Preston North End	1–0	5–0	1–0	0–0	2–1	1–3	2–2	0–1	3–2	1–1	2–0	4–2	4–0	2–1	2–0		3–0	1–0	1–0	0–1	1–2	1–0
Rochdale	2–2	0–3	1–1	4–1	0–0	2–0	2–0	0–1	1–2	2–1	1–0	1–3	1–0	3–3	0–0	0–1		1–1	1–2	2–0	0–2	1–0
Scarborough	0–1	1–2	1–2	0–1	0–1	3–1	2–2	0–2	3–1	0–0	2–2	3–1	1–1	2–5	0–0	1–1	2–4		3–0	1–1	1–2	0–1
Scunthorpe United	1–0	3–2	2–3	0–1	3–4	2–1	0–5	3–0	1–2	3–0	0–0	1–0	2–0	3–4	1–1	2–1	4–1	3–1		3–2	0–1	3–1
Torquay United	1–2	2–2	1–1	3–3	3–3	1–0	0–1	0–0	2–1	3–1	2–2	0–1	2–1	2–1	2–1	1–0	4–1	2–1	1–1		3–2	0–0
Walsall	4–0	0–1	1–2	1–3	2–0	2–0	1–0	1–0	5–1	2–1	4–1	4–3	2–1	1–0	1–1	2–2	0–0	4–1	2–1	1–0		2–0
Wigan Athletic	1–2	0–3	0–2	2–3	1–2	4–1	3–2	3–1	1–1	0–3	2–0	1–1	0–1	0–4	2–1	1–1	4–0	1–1	0–0	1–1	1–0	

Legend: Blue = home team win; Yellow = draw; Red = away team win.

=== Top scorers ===
Rank	Player	Club	Goals
1	(Scotland) Dougie Freedman	Barnet	24
2	(Bermuda) Kyle Lightbourne	Walsall	23
=	(England) Steve Wilkinson	Mansfield Town	23
4	(England) Dave Reeves	Carlisle United	20
5	(England) David Pugh	Bury	17
6	(Northern Ireland) Kevin Wilson	Walsall	16

=== Locations ===
Locations of the Third Division teams
Locations of the London-based Third Division teams

== See also ==
- 1994–95 in English football
