= 1994–95 Football League Trophy =

Auto Windscreens Shield

Tournament details
- Country: England; Wales

Final positions
- Champions: Birmingham City
- Runners-up: Carlisle United

The 1994–95 Football League Trophy, known for sponsorship reasons as the 1994–95 Auto Windscreens Shield, was the 14th staging of the Football League Trophy, a knock-out competition for English football clubs in the Second Division and the Third Division. The winners were Birmingham City and the runners-up were Carlisle United. This was the first trophy in Birmingham's "lower-league Double" of the Football League Second Division and Football League Trophy.

The competition began on 27 September 1994 and ended with the final on 23 April 1995 at Wembley Stadium.

In the first round, there were two sections split into seven groups: North and South. In the following rounds each section gradually eliminates teams in knock-out fashion until each has a winning finalist. At this point, the two winning finalists face each other in the combined final for the honour of the trophy.

== First round ==
=== Northern Section ===
Stockport County and Scarborough given byes to the second round

Group 1
Team	Pld	W	D	L	GF	GA	GD	Pts
Carlisle United	2	2	0	0	5	2	+3	6
Darlington	2	1	0	1	4	3	+1	3
Hartlepool United	2	0	0	2	0	4	−4	0

Date	Team 1	Score	Team 2
27 Sep	Darlington	2–3	Carlisle United
18 Oct	Carlisle United	2–0	Hartlepool United
8 Nov	Hartlepool United	0–2	Darlington

Group 2
Team	Pld	W	D	L	GF	GA	GD	Pts
Doncaster Rovers	2	2	0	0	3	0	+3	6
Lincoln City	2	1	0	1	1	1	0	3
Hull City	2	0	0	2	0	3	−3	0

Date	Team 1	Score	Team 2
27 Sep	Hull City	0–2	Doncaster Rovers
17 Oct	Doncaster Rovers	1–0	Lincoln City
8 Nov	Lincoln City	1–0	Hull City

Group 3
Team	Pld	W	D	L	GF	GA	GD	Pts
Huddersfield Town	2	2	0	0	5	1	+4	6
Bradford City	2	0	1	1	3	4	−1	1
York City	2	0	1	1	2	5	−3	1

Date	Team 1	Score	Team 2
11 Oct	Bradford City	1–2	Huddersfield Town
18 Oct	Huddersfield Town	3–0	York City
8 Nov	York City	2–2	Bradford City

Group 4
Team	Pld	W	D	L	GF	GA	GD	Pts
Rotherham United	2	1	1	0	4	2	+2	4
Chesterfield	2	0	2	0	2	2	0	2
Scunthorpe United	2	0	1	1	2	4	−2	1

Date	Team 1	Score	Team 2
27 Sep	Scunthorpe United	1–3	Rotherham United
18 Oct	Rotherham United	1–1	Chesterfield
8 Nov	Chesterfield	1–1	Scunthorpe United

Group 5
Team	Pld	W	D	L	GF	GA	GD	Pts
Wrexham	2	1	1	0	2	0	+2	4
Crewe Alexandra	2	0	2	0	2	2	0	2
Mansfield Town	2	0	1	1	2	4	−2	1

Date	Team 1	Score	Team 2
27 Sep	Crewe Alexandra	0–0	Wrexham
18 Oct	Wrexham	2–0	Mansfield Town
8 Nov	Mansfield Town	2–2	Crewe Alexandra

Group 6
Team	Pld	W	D	L	GF	GA	GD	Pts
Rochdale	2	2	0	0	3	1	+2	6
Wigan Athletic	2	1	0	1	1	1	0	3
Blackpool	2	0	0	2	1	3	−2	0

Date	Team 1	Score	Team 2
27 Sep	Blackpool	1–2	Rochdale
18 Oct	Rochdale	1–0	Wigan Athletic
8 Nov	Wigan Athletic	1–0	Blackpool

Group 7
Team	Pld	W	D	L	GF	GA	GD	Pts
Chester City	2	1	1	0	4	2	+2	4
Bury	2	1	0	1	2	3	−1	3
Preston North End	2	0	1	1	1	2	−1	1

Date	Team 1	Score	Team 2
28 Sep	Preston North End	1–1	Chester City
19 Oct	Chester City	3–1	Bury
9 Nov	Bury	1–0	Preston North End

=== Southern Section ===
Shrewsbury Town and Wycombe Wanderers given byes to the second round.

Group 1
Team	Pld	W	D	L	GF	GA	GD	Pts
Birmingham City	2	2	0	0	8	3	+5	6
Peterborough United	2	1	0	1	6	7	−1	3
Walsall	2	0	0	2	2	6	−4	0

Date	Team 1	Score	Team 2
27 Sep	Peterborough United	3–5	Birmingham City
18 Oct	Birmingham City	3–0	Walsall
8 Nov	Walsall	2–3	Peterborough United

Group 2
Team	Pld	W	D	L	GF	GA	GD	Pts
Exeter City	2	1	1	0	4	2	+2	4
Cardiff City	2	1	1	0	3	1	+2	4
Plymouth Argyle	2	0	0	2	1	5	−4	0

Date	Team 1	Score	Team 2
27 Sep	Cardiff City	2–0	Plymouth Argyle
18 Oct	Plymouth Argyle	1–3	Exeter City
15 Nov	Exeter City	1–1	Cardiff City

Group 3
Team	Pld	W	D	L	GF	GA	GD	Pts
Hereford United	2	1	1	0	5	3	+2	4
Swansea City	2	1	1	0	4	2	+2	4
Torquay United	2	0	0	2	3	7	−4	0

Date	Team 1	Score	Team 2
27 Sep	Hereford United	4–2	Torquay United
18 Oct	Torquay United	1–3	Swansea City
9 Nov	Swansea City	1–1	Hereford United

Group 4
Team	Pld	W	D	L	GF	GA	GD	Pts
Bristol Rovers	2	0	2	0	3	3	0	2
Oxford United	2	0	2	0	2	2	0	2
Bournemouth	2	0	2	0	1	1	0	2

Date	Team 1	Score	Team 2
27 Sep	Oxford United	2–2	Bristol Rovers
19 Oct	Bristol Rovers	1–1	Bournemouth
8 Nov	Bournemouth	0–0	Oxford United

Group 5
Team	Pld	W	D	L	GF	GA	GD	Pts
Brentford	2	2	0	0	4	1	+3	6
Gillingham	2	0	1	1	2	4	−2	1
Brighton & Hove Albion	2	0	1	1	1	2	−1	1

Date	Team 1	Score	Team 2
27 Sep	Gillingham	1–1	Brighton & Hove Albion
19 Oct	Brighton & Hove Albion	0–1	Brentford
8 Nov	Brentford	3–1	Gillingham

Group 6
Team	Pld	W	D	L	GF	GA	GD	Pts
Leyton Orient	2	1	0	1	5	3	+2	3
Fulham	2	1	0	1	5	7	−2	3
Colchester United	2	1	0	1	3	3	0	3

Date	Team 1	Score	Team 2
28 Sep	Colchester United	1–0	Leyton Orient
19 Oct	Leyton Orient	5–2	Fulham
9 Nov	Fulham	3–2	Colchester United

Group 7
Team	Pld	W	D	L	GF	GA	GD	Pts
Northampton Town	2	2	0	0	6	2	+4	6
Cambridge United	2	1	0	1	3	3	0	3
Barnet	2	0	0	2	1	5	−4	0

Date	Team 1	Score	Team 2
27 Sep	Barnet	0–2	Cambridge United
18 Oct	Cambridge United	1–3	Northampton Town
1 Nov	Northampton Town	3–1	Barnet

== Second round ==
=== Northern Section ===
Date	Home team	Score	Away team
28 November	Doncaster Rovers	0 – 1	Bury
29 November	Carlisle United	1 – 0	Chesterfield
29 November	Chester City	0 – 6	Crewe Alexandra
29 November	Rochdale	2 – 2	Darlington
Rochdale won 4-3 on penalties
29 November	Rotherham United	1 – 3	Wigan Athletic
29 November	Stockport County	3 – 1	Scarborough
29 November	Wrexham	6 – 1	Bradford City
30 November	Huddersfield Town	3 – 2	Lincoln City

=== Southern Section ===
Date	Home team	Score	Away team
29 November	Birmingham City	3 – 0	Gillingham
29 November	Bristol Rovers	4 – 2	Cambridge United
29 November	Exeter City	1 – 0	Cardiff City
29 November	Hereford United	2 – 0	Peterborough United
29 November	Leyton Orient	1 – 0	Fulham
29 November	Northampton Town	0 – 1	Swansea City
29 November	Shrewsbury Town	2 – 0	Wycombe Wanderers
3 December	Brentford	1 – 2	Oxford United

== Quarter-finals ==
=== Northern Section ===
Date	Home team	Score	Away team
10 January	Carlisle United	2 – 1	Wrexham
11 January	Rochdale	2 – 1	Stockport County
24 January	Bury	2 – 1	Huddersfield Town
7 February	Wigan Athletic	1 – 3	Crewe Alexandra

=== Southern Section ===
Date	Home team	Score	Away team
10 January	Birmingham City	3 – 1	Hereford United
10 January	Leyton Orient	0 – 0	Bristol Rovers
Leyton Orient won 4-3 on penalties
10 January	Oxford United	1 – 2	Swansea City
10 January	Shrewsbury Town	3 – 1	Exeter City

== Area semi-finals ==
=== Northern Section ===
Date	Home team	Score	Away team
7 February	Bury	1 – 2	Rochdale
14 February	Crewe Alexandra	0 – 1	Carlisle United

=== Southern Section ===
Date	Home team	Score	Away team
31 January	Birmingham City	3 – 2	Swansea City
31 January	Leyton Orient	2 – 1	Shrewsbury Town

== Area finals ==
=== Northern Area final ===
28 February 1995

Carlisle United	4 – 1	Rochdale
	Report

Brunton Park, Carlisle
Attendance: 8,647
14 March 1995

Rochdale	(3) 2 –1 (5)	Carlisle United
	Report

Spotland Stadium, Rochdale
Attendance: 4,082

=== Southern Area final ===
28 February 1995

Birmingham City	1 – 0	Leyton Orient
	Report

St. Andrew's, Birmingham
Attendance: 24,002
14 March 1995

Leyton Orient	(2) 2 – 3 (4)	Birmingham City
	Report

Brisbane Road, Leyton
Attendance: 10,830

== Final ==
23 April 1995

Birmingham City	1–0 (a.e.t.)	Carlisle United
Tait 103'	Report

Wembley, London
Attendance: 76,663
Referee: P.Foakes

== Notes ==
General

- statto.com

Specific
