= 1992–93 in English football =

Football in England
- Season: 1992–93

Men's football
- FA Premier League: Manchester United
- First Division: Newcastle United
- Second Division: Stoke City
- Third Division: Cardiff City
- FA Cup: Arsenal
- League Cup: Arsenal
- Charity Shield: Leeds United

Women's football
- National League Premier Division: Arsenal
- National League Division One North: Leasowe Pacific
- National League Division One South: London Bees
- WFA Cup: Arsenal
- National League Cup: Arsenal

The 1992–93 season was the 113th season of competitive football in England. The season saw the Premier League in its first season, replacing Division One of the Football League as the top league in England. Every team in the Premier League played each other twice within the season, one game away and one at home, and were awarded three points for a win and one for a draw.

== Overview ==
This season saw the birth of the FA Premier League. This meant a break-up of the 104-year-old Football League that had operated until then with four divisions.

In 1992 all of the First Division Clubs resigned from the Football League and, on 27 May, the FA Premier League was formed as a limited company, which worked out of an office at the Football Association's then headquarters, Lancaster Gate.

The three divisions which remained in the Football League were renamed. The old Division Two was now called 1st Division. The old Division Three was now called 2nd Division , and the old Division Four was now 3rd Division.

== Individual achievements ==
=== Players ===
Manchester United winger Ryan Giggs, 19, was voted PFA Young Player of the Year for the second year running after helping his employers win their first league title for 26 years.

Teddy Sheringham was the new Premier League's top scorer with 22 goals. He scored once for Nottingham Forest and was then transferred to Tottenham Hotspur, opening his goalscoring account with the club by scoring 21 league goals.

Chris Waddle was voted FWA Footballer of the Year after helping Sheffield Wednesday reach both domestic cup finals.

Guy Whittingham scores a club record 42 league goals during the season for Portsmouth. He was on target 46 times in all competitions.

The PFA Players' Player of the Year award went to experienced Aston Villa centre-back Paul McGrath.

Gary Pallister played every minute of Manchester United's title-winning Premier League campaign. No other player matched that feat until the 2014–15 season, more than two decades later.

Coventry signed Newcastle striker Micky Quinn for a nominal fee in November, and he responded by scoring 17 Premier League goals (the first ten in six games) to keep the Sky Blues clear of relegation.

Striker Les Ferdinand established himself as one of the country's top marksmen with more than 20 goals in all competitions for Queens Park Rangers.

Alan Shearer scored 16 goals in his first 21 Premier League games for Blackburn Rovers before a serious knee injury ended his season.

David Kelly scored 25 Division One goals as Newcastle United secured promotion to the Premier League. Following the season, he joined Wolverhampton Wanderers, where he formed a strike partnership with Steve Bull.

Andy Cole scored 12 goals in his first 12 games for Division One champions Newcastle.

=== Managers ===
Alex Ferguson took Manchester United to title success in the new Premier League, ending their 26-year wait for the league title.

George Graham guided Arsenal to a unique double of winning both domestic cups in the same season.

Mike Walker pulled off one of the surprises of the season by taking Norwich City to a club best finish of third in the Premier League and helping them achieve European qualification for the first time in their history.

Gerry Francis helped Queens Park Rangers finish highest out of all the London-based clubs in the new Premier League as they finished fifth.

Kevin Keegan restored success to Newcastle United by guiding them to the Division One title.

Glenn Hoddle guided Swindon Town to success in the Division One playoffs to achieve promotion to the Premier League – and top-flight football for a club who had never played at that level before.

Lou Macari won the Division Two title with Stoke City.

Bruce Rioch continued the revival at Bolton Wanderers by gaining automatic promotion to Division One.

Alan Little had a dream start in management by winning the Division Three playoff with York City, just two months after he had taken over from John Ward.

Martin O'Neill took Wycombe Wanderers into the Football League as Conference champions.

== Events ==
=== Top division's first season as Premier League ===
The FA launched its new Premier League of 22 elite clubs, which broke away from the Football League. The new league was backed up by a £305million exclusive TV rights deal with BSkyB. This paved the way for the Premier League's members to spend heavily on new players and also to convert their stadia into an all-seater format, which was necessary as a result of the Taylor Report's requirement that top division stadia should be all seater from the start of the 1994–95 season.

=== Manchester United win title after 26 years ===
Manchester United won the first Premier League championship to end their 26-year wait for the league title. They fought off stiff competition from runners-up Aston Villa, third-placed Norwich City and fourth-placed Blackburn Rovers to finish top of the league. Brilliant young winger Ryan Giggs was PFA Young Player of the Year for the second year running, while Alex Ferguson received the Manager of the Year award. Other significant players in the title winning side were top goalscorer Mark Hughes, temperamental but brilliant French striker Eric Cantona (bought from Leeds United in mid-season), reliable centre back Gary Pallister and confident midfielder Paul Ince. Manchester United would go on further to dominate the Premier League for the next 20 years, with challenges coming from Arsenal, Newcastle United, Leeds United, Aston Villa, Blackburn Rovers, Liverpool, Manchester City and Chelsea for the title. The top three of Manchester United, Aston Villa and Norwich City mirrors that of the final Second Division table of 1974–75, the last season Manchester United played outside the top flight. Blackburn Rovers won the Third Division the same season.

=== Arsenal win cup double ===
Arsenal became the first team to win the FA Cup and League Cup in the same season, beating Sheffield Wednesday 2–1 in both finals. Steve Morrow scored the winning goal in the League Cup final, but was accidentally dropped by captain Tony Adams during the post-match celebrations, broke his arm and missed the FA Cup triumph. Arsenal's double gave them two places in UEFA competitions, meaning that Norwich City were awarded a UEFA Cup place for finishing third in the League. Norwich had never qualified for Europe before, due to the ban on English clubs following the Heysel stadium disaster.

=== Nottingham Forest relegated ===
Brian Clough retired after 18 years as manager of Nottingham Forest. In his final season as manager they were relegated from the Premier League, but earlier in his reign he had brought league championship and European Cup glory to the previously unfashionable club. There had even been some success in the final few years of his reign, as Forest were League Cup winners in 1989 and 1990. They were losing finalists in the 1991 FA Cup and 1992 League Cup, but finally bowed out of the top flight after the sale of key players like Des Walker and Teddy Sheringham who proved impossible to replace.

=== Swindon reach top division ===
Swindon Town finally reached the top flight of English football by beating Leicester City 4–3 in the Division One playoff final. They had been denied promotion three years earlier because of financial irregularities.

Manager of the Swindon side was 36-year-old Glenn Hoddle, the former Tottenham and England midfielder, who had built a formidable squad, containing players like Shaun Taylor, Micky Hazard, and Craig Maskell. Shortly after achieving promotion glory with Swindon, Hoddle agreed to become the manager of Chelsea, and was replaced at the County Ground by his assistant, John Gorman.

=== Wycombe get in the League ===
Martin O'Neill, who played in the great Nottingham Forest team of the late 1970s and early 1980s, achieved his first success in management by getting Wycombe Wanderers promoted to the Football League as well as completing the double by winning the FA Trophy. They replaced Halifax Town, who finished bottom of Division Three. Wycombe's fortunes had been looking good since they moved into their new Adams Park ground in 1990, and the Conference and FA Trophy double all but erased memories of the previous year when they went through the agony of missing out on promotion on goal difference to their bitter rivals Colchester United.

=== Maidstone lose place in the League ===
Maidstone United, struggling in the league's basement division with huge debts, no registered stadium and just two registered players, had their first game of the 1992–93 season cancelled and were given two days to guarantee that they would be able to fulfill their fixtures. Unable to comply with these requirements, the club resigned from the league on 17 August 1992. The club was soon reformed and applied to join the Kent County League for the following season. The League decided that Maidstone would not be replaced by another club, so the top four tiers of the English league pyramid would revert to the 92-club format which it had adopted until 1991.

=== Barnet win promotion ===
Controversial chairman Stan Flashman quit Barnet after a season of turmoil in which he regularly sacked and reinstated manager Barry Fry, but the club still managed to win promotion from Division Three despite spending months on the verge of oblivion due to a mounting financial crisis. They had been banned from the transfer market for most of the season because they were unable to afford their player's wages.

=== League changes sponsor ===
Barclays bank ended their six-year sponsorship of the Football League. They were replaced by Endsleigh Insurance, who put pen to paper in a three-year sponsorship deal.

== Notable debuts ==
5 September 1992: Andy Turner, midfielder aged 17 years and 166 days, becomes the youngest Premier League scorer when he scores on his competitive debut for Tottenham Hotspur against Everton.

16 September 1992: Gary Neville, 17-year-old defender, makes his debut for Manchester United against Torpedo Moscow in the UEFA Cup first round first leg tie at Old Trafford, which ends in a goalless draw.

23 September 1992: David Beckham, 17-year-old midfielder, comes on as a substitute for Manchester United as they draw 1–1 at Brighton in the Football League Cup second round first leg.

27 September 1992: Nick Barmby, 18-year-old attacking midfielder, makes his debut for Tottenham Hotspur in a 2–0 Premier League defeat at Sheffield Wednesday.

21 November 1992: Nicky Butt, 17-year-old midfielder, comes on a substitute for Manchester United in their 3–0 home win over Oldham Athletic in the Premier League.

5 December 1992: Sol Campbell, 18-year-old defender, scores on his debut for Tottenham Hotspur as they lose 2–1 at home to Chelsea in the Premier League.

== Notable retirements ==
- Tommy Caton, Charlton Athletic defender formerly with Manchester City and Arsenal, retired in March after two years out of action with injury, and died the following month from a heart attack at the age of 30.
- Brian Clough, Legendary manager of Hartlepool United, Derby County, Brighton, Leeds United, and Nottingham Forest retired after 28 years in club management. His last meaningful game on 6 May 1993 against Sheffield United confirmed Nottingham Forest relegation following a 2–0 defeat at The City Ground.
- Chris Hughton, former Tottenham Hotspur and Republic of Ireland defender, retired at the end of season when playing for Brentford.
- Darren Salton, retired after being badly injured in a car crash in November. He had played 18 times in the league for Luton Town and was capped six times by the Scotland under-21 side. His teammate Paul Telfer was also in the car but suffered only minor injuries.
- Gary A. Stevens, Portsmouth defender, retired after failing to recover from a knee injury suffered in the 1988–89 season when tackled by Vinnie Jones.

== Top goalscorers ==
=== Premier League ===
- Teddy Sheringham (Nottingham Forest/Tottenham Hotspur) – 22 goals

=== Division One ===
- Guy Whittingham (Portsmouth) – 42 goals

=== Division Two ===
- Bob Taylor (West Bromwich Albion) – 30 goals

=== Division Three ===
- Darren Foreman (Scarborough)/Carl Griffiths (Shrewsbury Town) – 27 goals

English League Leading Goalscorers

== Honours ==
Competition	Winner
FA Cup	Arsenal (6)
League Cup	Arsenal (2)
FA Premier League	Manchester United (8/1)
Football League First Division	Newcastle United
Football League Second Division	Stoke City
Football League Third Division	Cardiff City
Autoglass Trophy	Port Vale
Charity Shield	Leeds United

Notes = Number in parentheses is the times that club has won that honour (First Division & Premier League). Number after slash is Premier League only. * indicates new record for competition

== England national team ==
Date	Opposition	Venue	Competition	Result	Score
9 September 1992	Spain	El Sardinero, Santander	Friendly	Lost	0–1
14 October 1992	Norway	Wembley Stadium	World Cup Qualifier	Drew	1–1
18 November 1992	Turkey	Wembley Stadium	World Cup Qualifier	Won	4–0
17 February 1993	San Marino	Wembley Stadium	World Cup Qualifier	Won	6–0
31 March 1993	Turkey	Atatürk Stadyumu, Izmir, Turkey	World Cup Qualifier	Won	2–0
28 April 1993	Netherlands	Wembley Stadium	World Cup Qualifier	Drew	2–2
29 May 1993	Poland	Stadion Slaski, Chorzów, Poland	World Cup Qualifier	Drew	1–1
2 June 1993	Norway	Ullevaal Stadion, Oslo, Norway	World Cup Qualifier	Lost	0–2
9 June 1993	U.S.A.	Foxboro Stadium, Foxboro, Massachusetts, USA	US Cup	Lost	0–2
13 June 1993	Brazil	RFK Stadium, Washington, D.C., USA	US Cup	Drew	1–1
19 June 1993	Germany	Silverdome, Pontiac, Michigan, USA	US Cup	Lost	1–2

== League tables ==
=== FA Premier League ===
The first champions of the new Premier League were Manchester United, who ended their 26-year wait for a top division title in dramatic style. After some disappointing results in the opening months of the season, the arrival of French striker Eric Cantona from Leeds United in late November signalled a turnaround for Alex Ferguson's men, who only lost two more league games all season and finished as champions by a 10-point margin above their nearest contenders Aston Villa, managed by Ferguson's predecessor as United manager Ron Atkinson. Finishing in third place were a Norwich City side who had been among the pre-season favourites for relegation, but had instead spent the season chasing the title and actually leading the league more than once. Newly promoted Blackburn Rovers, in the top flight for the first time since the 1960s, finished fourth, their title challenge having slowed down after top scorer Alan Shearer was ruled out for the second half of the season with injury. Fifth placed QPR were the highest place of the London sides, although 10th placed Arsenal did manage to win a unique double of the FA Cup and League Cup, defeating Sheffield Wednesday in both finals.

Liverpool endured another relatively disappointing season in the league, finishing sixth for the second season running, although they had entered March in 15th place before a strong finish to the season, in which Ian Rush found the net 11 times, saw them climb up the table. Defending champions Leeds United had an even more disappointing campaign, finishing 17th and failing to win a single away game in the league.

The first team to go down from the Premier League were Nottingham Forest, whose iconic manager Brian Clough retired after 18 years at the helm. Newly promoted Middlesbrough, who had fallen from mid table after a disastrous run of late winter form, went down on the final day, as did Crystal Palace on goal difference – while Oldham Athletic survived on goal difference after winning their final three games of the season.

Pos	Team	Pld	W	D	L	GF	GA	GD	Pts	Qualification or relegation
1	Manchester United (C)	42	24	12	6	67	31	+36	84	Qualification for the Champions League first round
2	Aston Villa	42	21	11	10	57	40	+17	74	Qualification for the UEFA Cup first round (Note: Since League Cup winners Arsenal had qualified for the UEFA Cup Winners Cup by also winning the FA Cup, the UEFA Cup berth for the League Cup reverted to the league and was awarded to Norwich City. England was considered for an extra slot for the UEFA Cup after the 1993 Polish football scandal, but another one was given to Scotland, and it was thought excessive to give both two slots to Great Britain, and the extra place was awarded to Hungary.)
3	Norwich City	42	21	9	12	61	65	−4	72	Qualification for the UEFA Cup first round
4	Blackburn Rovers	42	20	11	11	68	46	+22	71	
5	Queens Park Rangers	42	17	12	13	63	55	+8	63	
6	Liverpool	42	16	11	15	62	55	+7	59	
7	Sheffield Wednesday	42	15	14	13	55	51	+4	59	
8	Tottenham Hotspur	42	16	11	15	60	66	−6	59	
9	Manchester City	42	15	12	15	56	51	+5	57	
10	Arsenal	42	15	11	16	40	38	+2	56	Qualification for the Cup Winners' Cup first round (Note: Arsenal qualified by winning the FA Cup and therefore did not take up their UEFA Cup spot for winning the League Cup, which reverted to the league.)
11	Chelsea	42	14	14	14	51	54	−3	56	
12	Wimbledon	42	14	12	16	56	55	+1	54	
13	Everton	42	15	8	19	53	55	−2	53	
14	Sheffield United	42	14	10	18	54	53	+1	52	
15	Coventry City	42	13	13	16	52	57	−5	52	
16	Ipswich Town	42	12	16	14	50	55	−5	52	
17	Leeds United	42	12	15	15	57	62	−5	51	
18	Southampton	42	13	11	18	54	61	−7	50	
19	Oldham Athletic	42	13	10	19	63	74	−11	49	
20	Crystal Palace (R)	42	11	16	15	48	61	−13	49	Relegation to Football League First Division
21	Middlesbrough (R)	42	11	11	20	54	75	−21	44	Relegation to Football League First Division
22	Nottingham Forest (R)	42	10	10	22	41	62	−21	40	Relegation to Football League First Division

Source: Premier League
Rules for classification: 1) points; 2) goal difference; 3) number of goals scored.
(C) Champions; (R) Relegated
Notes:

Leading goalscorer: Teddy Sheringham (Tottenham Hotspur) – 22

=== League Division One ===
Newcastle United's first full season under the management of Kevin Keegan ended in Division One championship glory and promotion to the Premier League. Following the Geordies into football's big-money league were West Ham United and Swindon Town. West Ham had suffered relegation just one season earlier, and had been many people's favourites for an automatic return to the elite. Swindon, meanwhile, had finally reached the top flight after 73 years of trying – they had actually won promotion via the playoffs three years earlier, but promotion had been denied a few weeks later due to financial irregularities.

Third-placed Portsmouth had opened up a 9-point gap over fourth-placed Tranmere Rovers, but lost to Leicester City in the playoff semi-finals and this ended any promotion hopes for a club who had begun the season as favourites for promotion, and ended it with 88 points. Despite a semi-final loss in the playoffs, the fourth-place finish for the Rovers was their highest-ever finish in the football pyramid. Similar to Pompey, Derby County was another team that failed to reach their preseason expectations, as they could only muster eighth-place at season's end. Surprising Grimsby Town, who was battling relegation a season ago, finished ninth, just above a Peterborough United squad spending their first season in the second level.

In a tight relegation battle, Brentford, Cambridge United (who had just missed out on promotion a year earlier), and Bristol Rovers were the unlucky ones to move down to the Second Division. The Bees, newly promoted a season earlier, had stood in 10th place at the turn of 1993, but a sharp decline in form during the final few months of the season saw them relegated on the final day of the season. Five teams finished within three points of relegation, including Luton Town and Notts County, who both avoided a second successive drop.

Pos	Team	Pld	W	D	L	GF	GA	GD	Pts	Qualification or relegation
1	Newcastle United (C, P)	46	29	9	8	92	38	+54	96	Promotion to the Premier League
2	West Ham United (P)	46	26	10	10	81	41	+40	88	Promotion to the Premier League
3	Portsmouth	46	26	10	10	80	46	+34	88	Qualification for the First Division play-offs
4	Tranmere Rovers	46	23	10	13	72	56	+16	79	Qualification for the First Division play-offs
5	Swindon Town (O, P)	46	21	13	12	74	59	+15	76	Qualification for the First Division play-offs
6	Leicester City	46	22	10	14	71	64	+7	76	Qualification for the First Division play-offs
7	Millwall	46	18	16	12	65	53	+12	70	
8	Derby County	46	19	9	18	68	57	+11	66	
9	Grimsby Town	46	19	7	20	58	57	+1	64	
10	Peterborough United	46	16	14	16	55	63	−8	62	
11	Wolverhampton Wanderers	46	16	13	17	57	56	+1	61	
12	Charlton Athletic	46	16	13	17	49	46	+3	61	
13	Barnsley	46	17	9	20	56	60	−4	60	
14	Oxford United	46	14	14	18	53	56	−3	56	
15	Bristol City	46	14	14	18	49	67	−18	56	
16	Watford	46	14	13	19	57	71	−14	55	
17	Notts County	46	12	16	18	55	70	−15	52	
18	Southend United	46	13	13	20	54	64	−10	52	
19	Birmingham City	46	13	12	21	50	72	−22	51	
20	Luton Town	46	10	21	15	48	62	−14	51	
21	Sunderland	46	13	11	22	50	64	−14	50	
22	Brentford (R)	46	13	10	23	52	71	−19	49	Relegation to the Second Division
23	Cambridge United (R)	46	11	16	19	48	69	−21	49	Relegation to the Second Division
24	Bristol Rovers (R)	46	10	11	25	55	87	−32	41	Relegation to the Second Division

Source: rsssf.com
Rules for classification: 1) Points; 2) Goals scored; 3) Goal difference
(C) Champions; (O) Play-off winners; (P) Promoted; (R) Relegated

Leading goalscorer: Guy Whittingham (Portsmouth) – 42

=== League Division Two ===
Lou Macari guided Stoke City to their first successful season in years as they were crowned Division Two champions. Bruce Rioch brought some long-awaited success to Bolton Wanderers as they occupied the division's second promotion place. Osvaldo Ardiles guided West Bromwich Albion to promotion via the playoffs, bringing some long-awaited success to another club who had once enjoyed better times.

Preston North End, Wigan Athletic, Mansfield Town and Chester City occupied Division Two's four relegation places. Mansfield were newly promoted, while the other three teams had been established at this level for no less than six years.

Hartlepool United equalled an English football record by playing eleven consecutive matches without scoring a single goal, in a terrible mid-season run which saw them fall from the promotion chase to the relegation battle, although some decent results in the final stages of the season kept them up. Brighton finished ninth in the table despite rising debts, the constant need to sell players, and doubts regarding the future of the club.

Pos	Team	Pld	W	D	L	GF	GA	GD	Pts	Qualification or relegation
1	Stoke City (C, P)	46	27	12	7	73	34	+39	93	Promotion to the First Division
2	Bolton Wanderers (P)	46	27	9	10	80	41	+39	90	Promotion to the First Division
3	Port Vale	46	26	11	9	79	44	+35	89	Qualification for the Second Division play-offs
4	West Bromwich Albion (O, P)	46	25	10	11	88	54	+34	85	Qualification for the Second Division play-offs
5	Swansea City	46	20	13	13	65	47	+18	73	Qualification for the Second Division play-offs
6	Stockport County	46	19	15	12	81	57	+24	72	Qualification for the Second Division play-offs
7	Leyton Orient	46	21	9	16	69	53	+16	72	
8	Reading	46	18	15	13	66	51	+15	69	
9	Brighton & Hove Albion	46	20	9	17	63	59	+4	69	
10	Bradford City	46	18	14	14	69	67	+2	68	
11	Rotherham United	46	17	14	15	60	60	0	65	
12	Fulham	46	16	17	13	57	55	+2	65	
13	Burnley	46	15	16	15	57	59	−2	61	
14	Plymouth Argyle	46	16	12	18	59	64	−5	60	
15	Huddersfield Town	46	17	9	20	54	61	−7	60	
16	Hartlepool United	46	14	12	20	42	60	−18	54	
17	Bournemouth	46	12	17	17	45	52	−7	53	
18	Blackpool	46	12	15	19	63	75	−12	51	
19	Exeter City	46	11	17	18	54	69	−15	50	
20	Hull City	46	13	11	22	46	69	−23	50	
21	Preston North End (R)	46	13	8	25	65	94	−29	47	Relegation to the Third Division
22	Mansfield Town (R)	46	11	11	24	52	80	−28	44	Relegation to the Third Division
23	Wigan Athletic (R)	46	10	11	25	43	72	−29	41	Relegation to the Third Division
24	Chester City (R)	46	8	5	33	49	102	−53	29	Relegation to the Third Division

Rules for classification: 1) Points; 2) Goals scored; 3) Goal difference
(C) Champions; (O) Play-off winners; (P) Promoted; (R) Relegated

Leading goalscorer: Bob Taylor (West Bromwich Albion) – 30

=== League Division Three ===
Cardiff City and Wrexham continued their good progress by occupying Division Three's top two places. They were joined in third place by Barnet, who had spent most of the season on the brink of expulsion from the league due to financial problems. The final promotion place went to York City, who won the playoffs just weeks after Alan Little was appointed manager.

For a consecutive season, one of the fourth tier's members was forced to resign from the Football League (and consequently folded), when Maidstone United resigned after only three years in the League, as financial problems caused by their having to play their home matches 70 miles away in Dartford ultimately proved fatal. Rather than reprieving the team who finished bottom this season in order to make up for Maidstone's departure, the League abandoned its expansion plans and confirmed that relegation and promotion between Division Three and the Football Conference would continue as normal.

As a result of this, Halifax Town, after 72 years of league membership, finished bottom of the league and were replaced by Conference champions Wycombe Wanderers. They went down following an escape act by Gillingham, whose player-manager Glenn Roeder then moved up two divisions to take charge of Watford.

Halifax's place in the league was taken by GM Vauxhall Conference champions Wycombe Wanderers, managed by the former Nottingham Forest player Martin O'Neill.

Pos	Team	Pld	W	D	L	GF	GA	GD	Pts	Promotion or relegation
1	Cardiff City (C, P)	42	25	8	9	77	47	+30	83	Cup Winners' Cup first round and promotion to the Second Division
2	Wrexham (P)	42	23	11	8	75	52	+23	80	Promotion to the Second Division
3	Barnet (P)	42	23	10	9	66	48	+18	79	Promotion to the Second Division
4	York City (O, P)	42	21	12	9	72	45	+27	75	Qualification for the Third Division play-offs
5	Walsall	42	22	7	13	76	61	+15	73	Qualification for the Third Division play-offs
6	Crewe Alexandra	42	21	7	14	75	56	+19	70	Qualification for the Third Division play-offs
7	Bury	42	18	9	15	63	55	+8	63	Qualification for the Third Division play-offs
8	Lincoln City	42	18	9	15	57	53	+4	63	
9	Shrewsbury Town	42	17	11	14	57	52	+5	62	
10	Colchester United	42	18	5	19	67	76	−9	59	
11	Rochdale	42	16	10	16	70	70	0	58	
12	Chesterfield	42	15	11	16	59	62	−3	56	
13	Scarborough	42	15	9	18	66	71	−5	54	
14	Scunthorpe United	42	14	12	16	57	54	+3	54	
15	Darlington	42	12	14	16	48	53	−5	50	
16	Doncaster Rovers	42	11	14	17	42	57	−15	47	
17	Hereford United	42	10	15	17	47	60	−13	45	
18	Carlisle United	42	11	11	20	51	65	−14	44	
19	Torquay United	42	12	7	23	45	67	−22	43	
20	Northampton Town	42	11	8	23	48	74	−26	41	
21	Gillingham	42	9	13	20	48	64	−16	40	
22	Halifax Town (R)	42	9	9	24	45	68	−23	36	Relegation to Football Conference
23	Maidstone United	0	0	0	0	0	0	0	0 (Note: Maidstone United resigned from the Football League on 17 August 1992, and subsequently folded. At the time of their resignation, they had played no matches.)	Club folded

(C) Champions; (O) Play-off winners; (P) Promoted; (R) Relegated
Notes:

Leading goalscorers: Darren Foreman (Scarborough), and Carl Griffiths (Shrewsbury Town) – 27

== Women's football ==
=== Women's National League ===
==== National Division ====
Pos	Team	Pld	W	D	L	GF	GA	GD	Pts	Qualification or relegation
1	Arsenal (C)	18	17	0	1	66	8	+58	34	
2	Doncaster Belles	18	16	0	2	80	10	+70	32	
3	Knowsley United	18	11	1	6	37	33	+4	23	
4	Wimbledon	18	9	3	6	36	37	−1	21	
5	Red Star Southampton	18	7	3	8	37	41	−4	17	
6	Ipswich Town	18	7	3	8	31	49	−18	17	
7	Stanton Rangers	18	6	1	11	24	45	−21	13	
8	Millwall Lionesses	18	3	2	13	16	41	−25	8	
9	Maidstone Tigresses (R)	18	2	4	12	8	43	−35	8	Relegation to the Division One South
10	Bronte (R)	18	2	3	13	16	44	−28	7	Relegation to the Division One North

Source: WFA NL
(C) Champions; (R) Relegated

==== Division One North ====
Pos	Team	Pld	W	D	L	GF	GA	GD	Pts	Promotion or relegation
1	Leasowe Pacific (C, P)	18	16	1	1	100	21	+79	33	Promotion to the Premier Division
2	Nottingham Argyle	18	14	1	3	73	23	+50	29	
3	Abbeydale Alvechurch	18	11	3	4	62	20	+42	25	
4	Sheffield Wednesday	18	9	2	7	68	29	+39	20	
5	St Helens	18	9	1	8	67	49	+18	19	
6	Wolverhampton	18	7	3	8	52	37	+15	17	
7	Villa Aztecs	18	8	1	9	47	45	+2	17	
8	Cowgate Kestrels	18	6	3	9	32	51	−19	15	
9	Sunderland	18	2	0	16	19	103	−84	4	Resigned from the league after the end of the season
10	Milton Keynes (R)	18	0	1	17	8	150	−142	1	Qualification for the relegation playoffs

Source: WFA NL
(C) Champions; (P) Promoted; (R) Relegated

==== Division One South ====
Pos	Team	Pld	W	D	L	GF	GA	GD	Pts	Promotion or relegation
1	District Line (C, P)	18	15	1	2	93	31	+62	31	Promotion to the Premier Division
2	Hassocks	18	12	2	4	53	38	+15	26	
3	Town & County	18	9	2	7	51	39	+12	20	
4	Hemel Hempstead	18	8	4	6	38	37	+1	20	
5	Brighton & Hove Albion	18	8	2	8	41	42	−1	18	
6	Horsham	18	6	5	7	34	42	−8	17	
7	Oxford United	18	5	5	8	20	34	−14	15	
8	Epsom & Ewell	18	6	2	10	44	52	−8	14	
9	Bristol Backwell	18	4	3	11	31	50	−19	11	
10	Saltdean (R)	18	3	2	13	30	70	−40	8	Qualification for the relegation playoffs

Source: WFA NL
(C) Champions; (P) Promoted; (R) Relegated

=== WFA Cup ===
==== Final ====
24 April 1993
14:30 BST

Arsenal	3–0	Doncaster Belles
Curley 45'; Ball 45+8'; Bampton 80'	Report

Manor Ground, Oxford
Attendance: 3,547
Referee: Mike Cairns (Coventry)

== Transfer deals ==
For subsequent transfer deals see 1993–94 in English football.

== Diary of the season ==
3 July 1992 – Ron Atkinson appoints Dave Sexton, the man he succeeded as Manchester United manager eleven years ago, to his coaching staff at Aston Villa.

6 July 1992 – Liverpool sign 21-year-old goalkeeper David James from Watford for £1 million.

8 July 1992 – Blackburn Rovers sign Middlesbrough winger Stuart Ripley for £1.3 million.

10 July 1992 – Oldham Athletic pay a club record £600,000 for Manchester City defender Neil Pointon.

11 July 1992 – Ted Fenton, manager of West Ham United from 1950 to 1961, dies aged 77 after being injured in a car crash in Leicester.

14 July 1992 – Arsenal sign John Jensen, midfielder in Denmark's European Championship winning team, from Brøndby in a £1.1 million deal.

17 July 1992 – Chris Waddle returns to England after three years in France with Marseille, joining Sheffield Wednesday for £1 million.

19 July 1992 – Striker Kerry Dixon ends nine years at Chelsea to sign for Southampton in a £575,000 deal.

21 July 1992 – Tottenham Hotspur sign defender Neil Ruddock from Southampton for £750,000.

23 July 1992 – David Rocastle ends nine years at Arsenal by joining Leeds United in a £2 million deal.

25 July 1992 – Everton are reported to be £3.6 million in debt.

27 July 1992 – The new Premier League rejects sponsorship deals offered by Bass Breweries and Ford Motor Company, meaning it will be without a sponsor in its first season.

28 July 1992 – Alan Shearer signs for newly promoted Blackburn Rovers for an English record fee of £3.5 million, with David Speedie moving in the opposite direction in part exchange. Aston Villa add Ray Houghton, from Liverpool for £900,000, to their ranks.

29 July 1992 – Lou Macari, the former Swindon Town manager now at Stoke City, is cleared of tax fraud offences at Winchester Crown Court. Swindon's former chairman Brian Hillier is found guilty and given a one-year prison sentence. Club accountant Vince Farrar is also found guilty and receives a six-month suspended sentence.

31 July 1992 – Coca-Cola become sponsors of the Football League Cup in a two-year deal worth £2.25 million.

1 August 1992 – Nottingham Forest sell defender Des Walker to Sampdoria for £1.5million.

3 August 1992 – Bass Brewery's reported US$17.1 million proposal to sponsor the Premier League for the first three seasons fails after three – Arsenal, Liverpool and Nottingham Forest – of the top-flight's 22 clubs object.

5 August 1992 – Manchester City sign winger Rick Holden from Oldham Athletic for £900,000.

7 August 1992 – Manchester United sign 23-year-old Cambridge United striker Dion Dublin for £1million.

8 August 1992 – Eric Cantona scores a hat-trick for Leeds United in a 4–3 victory over Liverpool at Wembley Stadium in the 1992 FA Charity Shield.

12 August 1992 – Chelsea pay a club record £2.1million for Norwich City's Scottish striker Robert Fleck.

14 August 1992 – Norwich City sign Mark Robins from Manchester United for £800,000, while Everton boost their attack with a £500,000 move for Paul Rideout. West Ham United winger Stuart Slater joins Celtic for £1.5million.

15 August 1992 – The new FA Premier League begins. The first goal is scored by Sheffield United striker Brian Deane in the fifth minute of a 2–1 home win over Manchester United. Alan Shearer begins his Blackburn Rovers career with two goals against Crystal Palace in a 3–3 draw at Selhurst Park.Arsenal surrender a two-goal lead to lose 4–2 at home to Norwich, with Mark Robins scoring twice on his debut for the visitors. In Division One, Bristol City and Portsmouth draw 3–3 in a thrilling match at Ashton Gate. Peterborough United, in the second tier for the first time, achieve a surprise 1–0 home win over promotion favourites Derby County. In the new Division Three, debt ridden Maidstone United have their first game of the season cancelled and are given 48 hours to guarantee that they will be able to fulfill their fixtures for this season.

16 August 1992 – Sky Sports broadcast their first live Premier League game. Teddy Sheringham scores the only goal as Nottingham Forest beat Liverpool at the City Ground. West Ham United begin their Division One promotion push with a 1–0 win at Barnsley. Notts County, who went down with West Ham last season, lose 1–0 at newly promoted Birmingham City.

17 August 1992 – Maidstone United resign from the Football League after being unable to guarantee that they can fulfil their fixtures for this season.

18 August 1992 – The second round of Premier League matches are played. Norwich and Coventry are the only two teams to begin the new league season with back-to-back victories, with Norwich defeating Chelsea 2–1 at Carrow Road and Coventry winning 2–0 away to a Tottenham side who have yet to secure a successor to last season's top scorer Gary Lineker in attack. Manchester United suffer another disappointing result, losing 3–0 at home to Everton. In Division One, Swindon Town achieve a dramatic 4–3 away win over Bristol Rovers.

22 August 1992 – Newly promoted Middlesbrough win 4–1 home over defending champions Leeds United at Ayresome Park. A match at Boundary Park sees Oldham beat Nottingham Forest 5–3. Sheffield Wednesday and Chelsea draw 3–3 at Hillsborough, and Manchester United pick up their first point of the season in a 1–1 draw with Ipswich at Old Trafford. Landlords West Ham United host tenants Charlton Athletic at Upton Park, and Charlton win 1–0 to make it three consecutive league wins and top the table.

24 August 1992 – Manchester United record their first Premier League win at the fourth time of asking when a late goal by Dion Dublin gives them a 1–0 win at Southampton.

25 August 1992 – Chester City lose 2–1 to Stockport County in the first match at their new Deva Stadium home in the League Cup. Manchester City equal the British national record for a defender (which they set last year when signing Keith Curle) by paying £2.5 million for Wimbledon's Terry Phelan. In Leeds United's 5–0 home win over Tottenham Hotspur, Eric Cantona becomes the first player to score a hat-trick in the Premier League. Newly promoted Ipswich take more points off a more favoured team, holding Liverpool to a 2–2 draw at Portman Road. Charlton take their winning start in Division One to four matches with a 4–1 win over Bristol Rovers at Upton Park.

26 August 1992 – QPR knock Coventry City off the top of the table with a 1–0 win at Highfield Road, to occupy top spot for the first time since October 1987. An East Midlands derby in Division One sees Leicester City beat Derby County 3–2 at Filbert Street.

27 August 1992 – Tottenham Hotspur pay £2.1 million for Nottingham Forest's 26-year-old striker Teddy Sheringham to fill the gap left in attack by Gary Lineker's departure in the close season.

29 August 1992 – Blackburn Rovers go top of the Premier League with a 2–0 away win over Coventry. QPR surrender their lead with a 1–0 defeat at Chelsea. A thrilling match at Maine Road ends in a 3–3 draw between Manchester City and Oldham Athletic. Manchester United's recovery continues with a 2–0 win at Nottingham Forest. Division One leaders Charlton drop points for the first time this season with a goalless draw at home to Luton. Cambridge United, who qualified for the playoff last season, suffer a fourth successive defeat when they crash 4–1 to Swindon Town at the County Ground.

30 August 1992 – Exeter City manager Alan Ball and former Bolton Wanderers manager Phil Neal join the England national team coaching staff.

31 August 1992 – Norwich go top of the Premier League with a 3–1 win over Nottingham Forest at Carrow Road.

1 September 1992 – Crystal Palace sign 21-year-old striker Chris Armstrong from Millwall for £1 million.

2 September 1992 – Aston Villa pay a club record £2.5 million for Liverpool striker Dean Saunders. Dion Dublin breaks his leg in Manchester United's 1–0 home win over Crystal Palace, and is expected to be out of action until early spring. Chelsea travel to Villa Park and beat Aston Villa 3–1.

5 September 1992 – An exciting set of Premier League fixtures includes a 1–0 home win for Norwich over Southampton, which maintains their lead of the table. Nottingham Forest are bottom of the table after a 4–1 defeat to Blackburn at Ewood Park. Manchester City beat Sheffield Wednesday 3–0 at Hillsborough. Wimbledon record their first win of the season with a 3–2 victory over Arsenal at Selhurst Park. Charlton remain top of Division One with a 2–0 win over Sunderland at Roker Park. Newcastle United take their winning start to the season to five successive victories with a 2–1 away win over Bristol Rovers. Wolverhampton Wanderers are third after a 4–3 win over Peterborough.

6 September 1992 – Hereford United have a Football League record four players sent off in a 1–1 Division Three draw with Northampton Town at the County Ground. Manchester United make it four consecutive Premier League victories by beating Leeds 2–0 at Old Trafford. Division One promotion favourites Derby County are currently bottom of the table with one point from their first five games, having lost 4–3 at home to Bristol City.

9 September 1992 – Vinnie Jones returns to Wimbledon after three years away in a £700,000 move from Chelsea.

11 September 1992 – Dean Saunders signs for Aston Villa from Liverpool, for a transfer fee of £2.3 million.

12 September 1992 – Norwich maintain their lead of the Premier League with a 3–2 win over Chelsea at Stamford Bridge. Manchester United have climbed to third after beating Everton 2–0 at Goodison Park to make it five league wins in succession. Crystal Palace are still looking for a first Premier League after being held to a 2–2 draw at home to Oldham, although Nottingham Forest are still bottom after losing 2–1 at home to Sheffield Wednesday. Newcastle go top of Division One with a sixth successive victory, beating Portsmouth 3–1 on Tyneside.

15 September 1992 – All 22 Division Three clubs receive £10,000 compensation each from the Football League to cover the loss of gate revenue brought upon by the recent demise of Aldershot and Maidstone United. Blackburn miss the chance to go top of the Premier League by losing 3–2 at home to Everton. West Ham boost their chances of an immediate return to the top flight by beating Bristol City 5–1 at Ashton Gate.

16 September 1992 – Derby County pay the record fee for a club outside the top division – and a national record for a defender – when they sign Notts County centre-back Craig Short in a £2.5 million deal. In the Premier League, Blackburn Rovers' unbeaten start comes to an end when Everton beat them 3–2 at Ewood Park, with Tony Cottee scoring twice.

19 September 1992 – At Villa Park, home debutant Dean Saunders sinks his former club, bagging two in a 4–2 win over a depleted Liverpool side. Meanwhile, Wimbledon's 1–1 draw with Blackburn Rovers ends with three players sent off: Tony Dobson and Mike Newell for Rovers and Vinnie Jones on his second debut for the Dons. Elsewhere in London, QPR and Middlesbrough drew 3–3 after a late Rangers penalty converted by Andy Sinton. Post-match, Boro boss Lennie Lawrence announces the cancellation of a move to sign Robert Lee, owing to the player's unwillingness to commit to a move away from the capital and the involvement of another club. Norwich are still top of the Premier League thanks to a 1–0 home win over Sheffield Wednesday. Newcastle extend their winning start to the Division One campaign to seven games, beating Bristol City 5–0. Millwall break into the playoff zone with a 6–0 home win over Notts County.

20 September 1992 – Division One leaders Newcastle United sign Charlton Athletic midfielder Robert Lee for £700,000.

26 September 1992 – Alan Shearer scored his tenth Premier League goal for Blackburn Rovers in his tenth appearance in a 2–0 defeat of Oldham Athletic at Ewood Park, although Norwich are still top of the table after a 1–1 draw at Coventry, who occupy third place. Division One leaders Newcastle have now won eight successive games, their latest triumph being by a single goal over Peterborough at London Road. Charlton are still second with a 2–0 home win over Swindon, while Derby finally win a league game at the eighth attempt, beating Southend United 2–0 at the Baseball Ground.

27 September 1992 – Wolves, third in Division One, strengthen their promotion push with a 4–0 away win over local rivals Birmingham City, with striker Darren Roberts scoring a hat-trick on his league debut following his recent move from non-league Burton Albion. Birmingham are sixth in the league the season after their promotion, although they have picked up just one point from their last four games after starting with four successive victories.

28 September 1992 – Preston North End's Les Chapman and Carlisle United's Aidan McCaffrey become the first managerial casualties of the season.

29 September 1992 – Manchester United are eliminated from the UEFA Cup on penalties after two goalless draws in their first round contest with Torpedo Moscow.

30 September 1992 – The month ends with Norwich City topping the Premier League, with Blackburn Rovers in second place, Coventry City third and Manchester United fourth. Brian Clough's Nottingham Forest prop up the top flight with just one win from their opening nine games. Crystal Palace, who finished third in the league two seasons ago, lie in second from bottom place. Newcastle United lead Division One with a 100% record in the league stretching eight games, with Charlton Athletic occupying second place without any defeats from their opening nine games. Wolverhampton Wanderers, Leicester City, Birmingham City (in the hunt for a second successive promotion) and Millwall occupy the playoff zone. Derby County, who began the season as most people's favourites for the Division One title, are third from bottom in the table, only a point ahead of Bristol Rovers and Barnsley.

3 October 1992 – Blackburn Rovers go top of the Premier League, displacing Norwich in dramatic fashion with a 7–1 win at Ewood Park. Strikers Alan Shearer and Roy Wegerle both find the net twice. Coventry hold onto third place with a 2–2 home draw against Crystal Palace. Defending champions Leeds crash to a 4–2 defeat at Ipswich. QPR are fourth after a 4–1 home win over their London rivals Tottenham, who are on the brink of the relegation zone.

4 October 1992 – Newcastle extend their 100% start to the Division One season to nine games with a 2–1 win over Brentford at Griffin Park. Wolves miss out on the chance to go second when West Ham hold them to a goalless draw at home.

9 October 1992 – Leeds United defeat VfB Stuttgart 2–0 in a play-off in the first round of the 1992–93 UEFA Champions League in the Nou Camp. Based on the results in the first two matches, Leeds would have been eliminated on the away goals rule. However, near the end of the second leg at Elland Road, Stuttgart had fielded four foreign players rather than the maximum permitted three. The result was declared void and Leeds were awarded the match 3–0 meaning a play-off was needed, which was staged in Barcelona.

10 October 1992 – The following week's international fixtures mean that there is no Premier League action this weekend. However, Football League fixtures are played, with Newcastle now having won 10 successive fixtures, beating Tranmere 1–0 at home. Second-placed Charlton lose 2–1 to Bristol City at Ashton Gate, but Wolves miss another chance to leapfrog them when they are held to a 1–1 draw by Southend at Roots Hall. Watford climb into the top half of the table with a 4–2 home win over Bristol Rovers, who fall into bottom place.

11 October 1992 – West Ham boost their Division One promotion push with another big victory, this time defeating Sunderland 6–0 at Upton Park.

14 October 1992 – England draw 1–1 with Norway in their disappointing opener to the World Cup qualifying series.

16 October 1992 – Tottenham Hotspur striker Gordon Durie is banned for three games after feigning an injury in order to win his team a free kick.

17 October 1992 – Norwich go back on top of the Premier League with a 2–1 home win over QPR, although victory for Blackburn on Monday will send Kenny Dalglish's team back to the summit of the league. West Ham move into second place in Division with a 4–0 away win of Bristol Rovers. Fifth-placed Swindon beat Notts County 5–1 at home.

18 October 1992 – Cardiff City chairman Rick Wright announces he is considering withdrawing the club from the Football League in order to transfer to the League of Wales next season. Ian Rush breaks Roger Hunt's 23-year goalscoring for Liverpool, and scores his 287th goal for the club in their 2–2 league draw with Manchester United at Old Trafford, although the Reds surrender their 2–0 lead when Mark Hughes scores twice during the final 10 minutes. Newcastle make it 11 successive victories with a 2–1 win over local rivals Sunderland at Roker Park, and are now 10 points ahead of second-placed West Ham and 11 points ahead of third-placed Wolves.

19 October 1992 – Blackburn miss the chance to regain their lead of the Premier League when they are held to a goalless draw at Aston Villa.

20 October 1992 – Chester City part company with manager Harry McNally after seven years in charge, following a poor start to the season.

21 October 1992 – Nottingham Forest are still bottom of the Premier League despite recording their second win of the season, a 1–0 home victory over Middlesbrough.

22 October 1992 – Cambridge United sack John Beck, who had guided them to successive promotions in the first two of his three seasons as manager.

23 October 1992 – Barclays Bank announce that they will not be renewing their sponsorship of the Football League after the end of the season. Barclays have been the league's sponsors since the start of the 1987–88 season.

24 October 1992 – Newcastle United's 11-match winning start to the Division One campaign ends with a 1–0 defeat at home to Grimsby Town. Blackburn go top of the Premier League on goal difference with a goalless draw at home to Manchester United, who have now gone 10 league games without a defeat but have drawn their last five following a five-match winning run, pushing them down to seventh place. The recent shortage of goals has led to calls for Alex Ferguson to sign another striker, and a recent £3.5million bid for Sheffield Wednesday striker David Hirst has been rejected.

25 October 1992 – Norwich miss the chance to go back on top of the Premier League with a 4–1 defeat to Liverpool at Anfield.

26 October 1992 – Former Queens Park Rangers captain Glenn Roeder is appointed player-manager of Gillingham in place of Damien Richardson.

31 October 1992 – October ends with Blackburn ahead of Norwich at the top of the Premier League with a vastly superior goal difference, after both teams were held to draws today. QPR, Arsenal and Coventry are all three points behind them, with QPR and Arsenal both having a game in hand. Manchester United suffer their first defeat in 11 games when a Lawrie Sanchez goal gives Wimbledon a 1–0 at Old Trafford and lifts the visitors out of the relegation zone. Everton have now fallen into the relegation zone after some promising performances early in the season, having lost 3–1 at home to Manchester City today.

1 November 1992 – Aston Villa moved into third place and are three points short of the top of the Premier League after a 2–0 home win over QPR.

2 November 1992 – Goals from Paul Merson and Ian Wright give Arsenal a 2–1 win over Crystal Palace at Selhurst Park, and send the Gunners into third place, just one point behind Blackburn and Norwich. Victory for Palace would have lifted the hosts out of the relegation zone on goal difference.

3 November 1992 – Midweek fixtures in Division One produce a series of dramatic results. Barnsley win 5–1 away to Bristol Rovers. Cambridge and Luton draw 3–3 at the Abbey Stadium. Oxford United and Portsmouth draw 5–5 at the Manor Ground. Peterborough climb to the brink of the playoff places with a 2–1 win over Watford at Vicarage Road. Derby County's recovery continues with a 2–0 win over local rivals Notts County at Meadow Lane.

4 November 1992 – Leeds United play Rangers at Elland Road in the second leg of their second round UEFA Champions League tie. Trailing 2–1 from the first leg in Glasgow, Leeds went into the return match strongly favoured to turn the tie around. However, Rangers defied expectations and won 2–1 again on the night to progress to the first ever group stages of the Champions League.

7 November 1992 – Arsenal go top of the Premier League with a 3–0 home win over Coventry City. Aston Villa boost their challenge with a 1–0 home win over Manchester United, who are now 10th in the table and have won none of their last seven league games, their worst run the league for three years. Their local rivals Manchester City beat Leeds United 4–0 at Maine Road – the same result which occurred in the clash between the two teams there last season. Liverpool beat Middlesbrough 4–1 at Anfield. Peterborough continue their surprise push for a playoff place in Division One by beating Sunderland 5–2 at London Road. Wolves beat Bristol Rovers 5–1 at the Molineux to keep their promotion challenge strong.

9 November 1992 – Mark Robins scores a hat-trick for Norwich City in their 3–2 away win over Oldham Athletic, which takes the Canaries back to the top of the Premier League.

10 November 1992 – Dennis Rofe resigns as manager of Division One strugglers Bristol Rovers, and is succeeded by 65-year-old Malcolm Allison on an interim basis.

13 November 1992 – Graham Barrow is given the Chester City manager's job on a permanent basis.

14 November 1992 – The forthcoming international fixtures mean that there is no Premier League action this weekend, but it is business as usual in the Football League. Luton remain the drop zone and in danger of a second successive relegation following a 4–0 defeat Oxford. Newcastle remain in pole position with a 3–1 win at Charlton, who have dropped to seventh following a recent downturn in form.

15 November 1992 – Transfer-listed Newcastle United striker Micky Quinn joins Coventry City on a month's loan.

18 November 1992 – England achieve a comfortable 4–0 win over Turkey in the second World Cup qualifying game. Wimbledon midfielder Vinnie Jones is fined £20,000 for his appearance in the video Soccer's Hard Men.

19 November 1992 – The High Court rules that Liverpool fan Tony Bland, 22, who suffered brain damage in the Hillsborough disaster in April 1989 and has been in a persistent vegetative state ever since, can have treatment withdrawn and be allowed to die.

21 November 1992 – Manchester United's seven-match winless Premier League run ends with a 3–0 home victory over Oldham Athletic, with two goals from Mark Hughes and another from Brian McClair. 17-year-old midfielder Nicky Butt makes his debut for United as a substitute. Midfielder Neil Webb leaves Old Trafford after three years and returns to Nottingham Forest for £800,000. Norwich now have a four-point lead at the top of the Premier League, having beaten Sheffield United 2–1 at Carrow Road. The bottom two clubs, Crystal Palace and Nottingham Forest, draw 1–1 at Selhurst Park. The main action in Division sees West Ham beat Oxford 5–3 at Upton Park and Tranmere squander the chance to go second with a 4–0 defeat at Fratton Park to a Portsmouth side who are closing in on the playoff places.

26 November 1992 – Manchester United sign Leeds United and France striker Eric Cantona in a £1.2 million deal.

27 November 1992 – 65-year-old former Manchester City manager Malcolm Allison is appointed team manager by Bristol Rovers.

28 November 1992 – Aston Villa's 12-match unbeaten run is ended when they lose 3–2 at home to Norwich, who now have a five-point lead over their nearest challengers Blackburn. Elsewhere in the Premier League, Mark Hughes scores the only goal as Manchester United win at the Arsenal, and at Ewood Park, Alan Shearer's goal helps the Rovers overcome the Rangers 1–0. Crystal Palace remain second from bottom with just one victory to their name after being beaten 5–0 by Liverpool at Anfield. Oldham move two more places clear of the relegation zone with a 4–1 win over Middlesbrough at Boundary Park. Newcastle maintain their runaway lead at the top of Division One with a 4–1 home win over Cambridge United.

29 November 1992 – Chelsea move into fifth place in the Premier League with a 1–0 win over Leeds at Stamford Bridge.

30 November 1992 – Norwich City finish November as Premier League leaders, leading Blackburn Rovers by five points. Crystal Palace and Nottingham Forest continue to prop up the top flight, while Everton have climbed out of the relegation zone at the expense of Wimbledon. In Division One, leaders Newcastle United now have a 12-point lead over their nearest contenders, Tranmere Rovers (in the hunt for top-flight football for the first time in their history, which would give them three promotions in just five seasons). The playoff zone is occupied by West Ham United, Swindon Town, Wolverhampton Wanderers and Millwall. A surprise promotion challenge is coming from Grimsby Town (who were playing in the old Fourth Division three years ago) who now occupy eighth place in Division One. The relegation zone is unchanged from the end of October, except for Luton Town having climbed a point above another team fighting two successive relegations, Notts County. UEFA announces that UEFA Euro 1996, held in England, will be contested by 16 teams, doubling the number of entrants from the traditional eight.

1 December 1992 – Barnet sack manager Barry Fry, despite being second-top of Division Three.

4 December 1992 – Birmingham City coach Ian Atkins is appointed manager of Cambridge United. At the top end of the Division table, John Aldridge scores a hat-trick as Tranmere strengthen their hold on second place with a 5–2 win over West Ham at Prenton Park.

5 December 1992 – Nottingham Forest win for only the third time in the league this season, beating Leeds 4–1 at Elland Road, but are still bottom of the table due to second-from-bottom Crystal Palace winning 2–0 at home to Sheffield United. Norwich now have an eight-point lead at the top of the Premier League after beating Wimbledon 2–1 at Carrow Road, while their nearest rivals Blackburn find themselves on the receiving end of a John Hendrie hat-trick and a 3–2 defeat to Middlesbrough at Ayresome Park. Newcastle maintain their wide lead at the top of Division One with a 2–0 away win over Notts County.

6 December 1992 – Eric Cantona makes his debut for Manchester United as a substitute in a 2–1 win for his new club in the Manchester derby at Old Trafford. United are now fifth in the Premier League after three successive victories.

7 December 1992 – Birmingham City are put up for sale with offers in the region of £750,000 invited for the 84% shareholding of former owner Samesh Kumar, who was recently declared bankrupt. Everton beat Liverpool 2–1 in the Merseyside derby at Goodison Park, with Everton's Peter Beardsley becoming only the second player who have scored for both clubs in Merseyside derbies. The result lifts Everton two places into 17th, while slip one place to 10th on goal difference.

8 December 1992 – John McGrath resigns as manager of Halifax Town, who are 17th in Division Three. Due to the club's desperate financial situation, they make the unorthodox move of appointing physiotherapist Mick Rathbone as manager for the remainder of the season.

11 December 1992 – Ipswich Town sign Bulgarian striker Bontcho Guentchev from Sporting CP for £250,000. Barnet reinstate manager Barry Fry ten days after sacking him. Chelsea climb into second place in the Premier League with a goalless draw at Middlesbrough.

12 December 1992 – Manchester United record a fourth successive Premier League victory, beating Norwich 1–0 at Old Trafford with Mark Hughes scoring the only goal of the game. They are now third in the table and six points behind the leaders. Aston Villa beat Nottingham Forest 2–1 at Villa Park to cut Norwich's lead of the table to five points. Oldham fall into the relegation zone with a 5–2 defeat against Wimbledon at Selhurst Park, which lifts Joe Kinnear's men out of the drop zone. Crystal Palace are level on points with both teams after defeating QPR 3–1 at Loftus Road.

13 December 1992 – Blackburn drop three more points when they lose 2–1 to Liverpool at Anfield. Newcastle suffer a rare defeat in Division One, losing 1–0 to Barnsley at Oakwell. Bristol Rovers climb out of the drop zone with an impressive 4–0 win over neighbours Bristol City at Twerton Park.

15 December 1992 – Micky Quinn signs for Coventry City on a permanent basis for £250,000, having scored six goals in four matches on loan.

18 December 1992 – Liverpool sign Norway defender Stig Inge Bjørnebye from Rosenborg for £600,000. A takeover of Peterborough United sees manager Chris Turner installed as chairman, with Lil Fuccillo being appointed manager.

19 December 1992 – Coventry City thrash Liverpool 5–1 at Highfield Road, inflicting Liverpool's heaviest league defeat for 16 years. Micky Quinn scores twice, taking his tally to eight goals in five matches, as does defender Brian Borrows. Aston Villa drop two points in their title, being held to a 1–1 draw with Manchester City at Maine Road. Tranmere strengthen their hold on second place in Division One with a 3–0 home win over sixth-placed Wolves.

20 December 1992 – Eric Cantona scores his first goal for Manchester United in a 1–1 league draw with Chelsea at Stamford Bridge. Crystal Palace beat Leeds 1–0 at Selhurst Park to make a third consecutive league title, lifting them out of the relegation zone.

21 December 1992 – Norwich are still four points ahead at the top of the Premier League despite a 2–0 home defeat to their East Anglian rivals Ipswich Town, who are now sixth in the table.

22 December 1992 – Chelsea sign Russian goalkeeper Dmitri Kharin from CSKA Moscow for £200,000.

26 December 1992 – Manchester United draw 3–3 at Sheffield Wednesday after being 3–0 down at half time, and are now second in the table behind Norwich City. Micky Quinn's good form for Coventry City continues as he scores twice in their 3–0 home win over title-chasing Aston Villa, making it 10 goals in his first six games for the club. Alan Shearer scores in a 3–1 home win for Blackburn over Leeds United to take his goals tally to 16 in the league and 22 in all competitions, but suffers a serious knee injury and is expected to be ruled out until next season. Crystal Palace win for the fourth game in succession, beating their tenants Wimbledon 2–0 to climb up to 17th place and push them deeper into relegation trouble. In the Division One promotion race, Newcastle maintain a wide lead at the top of the table by beating Wolves 2–1 at home, West Ham's hopes of automatic promotion are dented when they are held to a 1–1 draw by Charlton at the recently reopened Valley, and Brentford and Grimsby both win their Boxing Day fixtures to close in the playoff places.

28 December 1992 – Andy Sinton scores a hat-trick in Queens Park Rangers' 4–2 win over Everton. Norwich are held to a goalless draw by Leeds at Elland Road, and Manchester United move into second place and cut their lead to three points by beating Coventry 5–0 at Old Trafford. Crystal Palace resume their upturn in form with a 1–0 win over Middlesbrough at Ayresome Park. Newcastle suffer only their fourth Division One defeat of the season when Oxford beat them 4–2 at the Manor Ground. More drama in the promotion race sees Portsmouth beat Derby 4–2 at the Baseball Ground.

29 December 1992 – Chelsea climb four places up to fifth in the Premier League with a 1–0 win over Leeds at Stamford Bridge.

31 December 1992 – The year ends with Norwich City still leading the table, with a three-point lead over Manchester United. Nottingham Forest remain bottom, Wimbledon remain in the relegation zone and Crystal Palace have moved clear of the bottom three at the expense of Sheffield United. Newcastle United enter the new year with their 12-point lead over Tranmere Rovers still intact. West Ham United, Millwall, Portsmouth and Leicester City occupy the playoff zone. Newly promoted Brentford occupy tenth position and are just two points short of the playoff zone which would give them a chance of reclaiming the top division place they lost in 1947. However, Birmingham City's early promotion challenge has given way to a drastic loss of form that has pushed them to the bottom of Division One. Also facing the threat of relegation are Luton Town, who only slipped out of the top flight last season, and are only one point clear of the relegation zone, as well as Southend United and Cambridge United, who were both in last season's promotion hunt.

1 January 1993 – 35-year-old midfielder Gordon Strachan is awarded an OBE.

2 January 1993 – Crystal Palace, the 1990 FA Cup finalists, suffer a shock third round exit from the competition when they lose 1–0 at Hartlepool United.

4 January 1993 – Scunthorpe United manager Bill Green becomes the first Football League managerial casualty of 1993 when he is sacked in favour of Richard Money.

6 January 1993 – Eighteen months after leaving Manchester United for Aston Villa, Les Sealey returns to Old Trafford on a free transfer.

7 January 1993 – Blackburn Rovers sign Swedish midfielder Patrik Andersson from Malmö FF for £800,000.

9 January 1993 – The first Premier League games of 1993 see Manchester United go top of the Premier League on goal difference with a 4–1 home win over Tottenham, although they are still level on points with Aston Villa, who beat Liverpool 2–1 at Anfield, and a Norwich side who play tomorrow. Division One leaders Newcastle United beat Bristol City 2–1 at Ashton Gate.

10 January 1993 – Norwich miss the chance to regain their lead of the Premier League, losing 1–0 to Sheffield Wednesday at Hillsborough.

13 January 1993 – Liverpool suffer a shock FA Cup exit in the third round replay, losing 2–0 at home to Division Two side Bolton Wanderers.

14 January 1993 – Notts County, bottom of Division One and in danger of a second successive relegation, sack manager Neil Warnock.

16 January 1993 – Norwich draw 1–1 at home to Coventry and go back to the top of the Premier League. Nottingham Forest's survival hopes are boosted with a 3–0 home win over Chelsea. Blackburn get their title bid back on track with a 1–0 at Oldham.

17 January 1993 – Aston Villa go top of the Premier League with a 5–1 home win over Middlesbrough.

18 January 1993 – The lead of the Premier League changes for the third day running when Manchester United triumph 3–1 over QPR at Loftus Road to top the table on goal difference.

21 January 1993 – Denis Smith is sacked after less than ten months as manager of Bristol City.

26 January 1993 – Blackburn Rovers sign Norway defender Henning Berg from Lillestrøm in a £400,000 deal. There is midweek drama in the Premier League as Berg's new club lose 5–2 at home to a Coventry side who are now fifth in the table just five points off the top. Middlesbrough jump clear of the relegation zone with a 2–1 home win over Southampton. Oldham's survival bid is dented by a 1–0 home defeat to Manchester City, who climb four places to sixth. Wimbledon miss the chance to climb out of the drop zone, losing 3–1 at home to Everton.

27 January 1993 – The top three sides in the Premier League all achieve home wins. Manchester United beat Nottingham Forest 2–0, Aston Villa beat Sheffield United 3–1 and Norwich battle it out to beat Crystal Palace 4–2. A West London derby at Loftus Road sees Chelsea and QPR draw 1–1. Ipswich beat Tottenham 2–0 at White Hart Lane.

30 January 1993 – Norwich return to the top of the Premier League with a 1–0 win over Everton at Goodsion Park, thanks to their local rivals Ipswich beating Manchester United 2–1 at Portman Road and Aston Villa losing 2–0 at Southampton. Ipswich are now fourth in the table, six points off the top and surprisingly emerging as title contenders for the first time in 11 years. Blackburn continue to feel the absence of Alan Shearer as they lose 3–2 to Manchester City at Maine Road. Oldham fall to the bottom of the table after Nottingham Forest overhaul them with a 2–0 victory at the City Ground. Wimbledon climb out of the relegation zone with a 2–0 win at Coventry. Liverpool, who didn't play today, are now a lowly 17th in the table, but have games in hand over everyone else in the Premier League.

31 January 1993 – January ends with Norwich City still top of the Premiership, but with their lead over Manchester United now down to a single point. Aston Villa and Ipswich Town are continuing to keep up the pressure, but Blackburn Rovers have slumped to fifth place. Nottingham Forest and Oldham Athletic hold the bottom two places, with Sheffield United still occupying the final relegation position. The Division One promotion chase is still led by runaway leaders Newcastle United, whose nearest challenge is from a West Ham United side who are 11 points behind them with a game in hand. Millwall, Tranmere Rovers, Portsmouth and Leicester City occupy the playoff zone. The division's bottom two clubs, Luton Town and Notts County, are under serious threat of a second successive relegation, joined in the bottom three by a Southend United side who spent much of last season challenging for promotion to the Premier League. The only league action of the day sees Liverpool win 1–0 at Arsenal to climb five places up to 12th in the Premier League. Arsenal are now 10th in the league after briefly topping the table in November, but are still in contention for the FA Cup and League Cup.

1 February 1993 – Sunderland, struggling in Division One, sack Malcolm Crosby as manager, nine months after he led them to the FA Cup final.

2 February 1993 – Blackburn's title challenge continues to fade with a 2–1 home defeat to Crystal Palace, with the result boosting the visiting side's survival bid.

4 February 1993 – Nearly seven years after selling him to Aston Villa, Arsenal buy Martin Keown from Everton for £2 million.

5 February 1993 – Terry Butcher is named as the new manager of Sunderland, one year after being sacked by Coventry City.

6 February 1993 – Manchester United regain their lead of the Premier League on goal difference, beating Sheffield United 2–1 at Old Trafford after coming from a goal behind. Second-placed Aston Villa beat Ipswich 2–0 at home. Oldham boost their survival hopes but remain in the bottom three with a 3–1 win over Chelsea at Boundary Park. The biggest drama in Division One sees Millwall move one point short of the top two with a 5–2 home win over Watford, while Derby have slid into the bottom half of the table with a 3–2 defeat at home to Peterborough.

8 February 1993 – Manchester United remain top of the Premier League despite being held to a goalless draw by Leeds at Elland Road.

9 February 1993 – Ipswich and QPR draw 1–1 at Portman Road. Sheffield United climb off the bottom of the Premier League table with a 2–0 win over Middlesbrough, who are now just one place outside the relegation zone following a run of bad results. Among the midweek action in Division One is Newcastle United's fifth defeat of the season, a 2–0 reverse at Portsmouth, but they remain firmly in the lead at the top of the table.

10 February 1993 – Wimbledon continue their climb up the table with a 1–0 win over Arsenal at Highbury. Aston Villa miss the chance to go top, losing 1–0 to Crystal Palace at Selhurst Park, with the result helping the hosts move further clear of the relegation zone. Norwich's title hopes are hit by a 3–0 defeat at Southampton.

12 February 1993 – Newcastle United sign 21-year-old striker Andy Cole from Bristol City for a club record £1.75 million.

13 February 1993 – Manchester United's double hopes are ended when they lose 2–1 to Sheffield United at Bramall Lane in the FA Cup fifth round. Steve Bruce misses a penalty.

14 February 1993 – Paul Compton resigns as Torquay United manager hours after a defeat by Division Three leaders Cardiff City, which leaves Torquay bottom of the entire Football League and in serious danger of relegation to the Conference. Neil Warnock, who joined the club only days beforehand as a "footballing consultant", replaces Compton as manager.

15 February 1993 – Ian Porterfield is sacked after less than two years as manager of Chelsea. David Webb, who left the Southend United job last summer, is appointed as Chelsea's new manager on a trial contract until the end of the season. Alan Shearer will miss the rest of the season following surgery on his knee injury.

17 February 1993 – England achieve a third successive win in their World Cup qualifying series, triumphing 6–0 over San Marino at Wembley.

20 February 1993 – Aston Villa return to the top of the Premier League with a 2–1 home win over Everton, but Manchester United keep the pressure on them when two late goals from Ryan Giggs give them a 2–1 home win over Southampton after a goal from substitute Nicky Banger put the Saints in the lead. Norwich keep their title bid going with a 2–1 home win over Manchester City. Nottingham Forest boost their survival bid with a 2–1 away win over Middlesbrough. QPR move up to fourth win a 2–0 home win over Coventry, who drop two places to seventh. Tottenham's upturn continues with a 4–0 home win over Leeds, in which Teddy Sheringham scores the club's first Premier League hat-trick.

21 February 1993 – Blackburn win 2–0 at home to Chelsea, although they are still 12 points off the top they have two games in hand. The top two clubs in Division One, West Ham and Newcastle, grind out a goalless draw at Upton Park.

22 February 1993 – Sheffield United climb out of the relegation zone with a 2–0 home win over Oldham, who are now bottom of the table and four points adrift of safety.

23 February 1993 – Sheffield Wednesday climb into fourth place with a 2–1 win over Manchester City at Maine Road, sparking talk of a possible late run for the Premier League title.

24 February 1993 – Nottingham Forest climb out of the relegation zone with a 1–0 win over QPR at the City Ground.

27 February 1993 – Aston Villa remain top of the Premier League with a 1–0 home win over Wimbledon, although Manchester United are still just two points of them with a game in hand after a 3–0 win over Middlesbrough at Old Trafford.

28 February 1993 – February ends with Aston Villa top of the Premier League, two points ahead of Manchester United, who have a match in hand. Norwich City, Sheffield Wednesday and Blackburn Rovers complete the top five. Oldham Athletic prop up the table, with Middlesbrough and Sheffield United joining them in the bottom three. Division One leaders Newcastle United have a seven-point margin over their nearest rivals West Ham United, and the playoff zone is occupied by Millwall, Swindon Town, Portsmouth and Tranmere Rovers. Grimsby Town's unlikely promotion challenge continues as they are just three goals away from a place in the top six. An improvement in form has seen Notts County and Luton Town climb out of the bottom three and ease their fears of a second successive relegation; the relegation zone now consists of Southend, Bristol Rovers and Birmingham. The only league action of the day is a goalless draw between Norwich and Blackburn at Carrow Road, a result which does no favours to the Premier League title ambitions of either team.

1 March 1993 – A mid-table London derby in the Premier League is the only league action of the day, with Chelsea beating Arsenal 1–0 at Stamford Bridge.

2 March 1993 – Middlesbrough halt their slump in Premier League form but remain in the relegation zone on goal difference, beating Ipswich 1–0 at Portman Road. Sheffield United climb out of the relegation zone with a remarkable 6–0 win over Tottenham at Bramall Lane.

3 March 1993 – Tony Bland dies in hospital after treatment was withdrawn, making him the Hillsborough disaster's 96th victim after nearly four years in a coma.

6 March 1993 – Manchester United beat struggling Liverpool 2–1 at Anfield in the Premier League.

7 March 1993 – With Bristol Rovers having fallen back to the foot of Division One after a brief improvement in results, Malcolm Allison announces his intention to resign as soon as a successor can be appointed.

8 March 1993 – Birmingham City are taken over by newspaper publisher David Sullivan, who appoints 24-year-old Karren Brady as the first female managing director of a professional football club.

9 March 1993 – Manchester United remain top of the Premier League despite a 1–0 defeat to Oldham at Boundary Park, with Neil Adams scoring the only goal of the game.

10 March 1993 – Aston Villa miss the chance to go back on top of the Premier League, they goalless draw at home to Tottenham meaning that Manchester United still lead the way on goal difference. Norwich keep their title challenge on track with a 1–0 away win over Sheffield United.

12 March 1993 – Russell Osman becomes the Bristol City's new manager. John Ward leaves York City to take over at Bristol Rovers, and is succeeded at Bootham Crescent by Alan Little.

14 March 1993 – Manchester United and Aston Villa remained locked together on points at the top of the Premier League after a 1–1 draw at Old Trafford.

20 March 1993 – Aston Villa return to the top of the Premier League with a 2–0 home win over Sheffield Wednesday, as the Manchester derby ends in a 1–1 draw at Maine Road. Norwich's 3–0 defeat away to Wimbledon keeps them in third place and is a major step towards survival for their hosts. An entertaining clash at Highbury sees Arsenal beat Southampton 4–3.

21 March 1993 – Nottingham Forest miss the chance to climb back out of the relegation zone after Leeds hold them to a 1–1 draw at the City Ground.

22 March 1993 – Oldham climb out of the bottom three with a 3–2 win over Middlesbrough at Ayresome Park, which pushes their hosts deeper into relegation trouble.

24 March 1993 – Bryan Hamilton resigns as Wigan Athletic manager in the wake of a defeat to Division Two's basement side Chester City, with Wigan in serious danger of their first-ever relegation. Dave Philpotts is appointed as caretaker manager for the remainder of the season. Midweek drama in the Premier League sees Sheffield United climb out of the relegation zone with a 3–1 win over Coventry at Highfield Road. Ipswich are now 16th in the table just two months after being fourth, following a 3–0 defeat to Everton at Goodison Park. Following a 3–0 win over QPR at Loftus Road, Blackburn are 15 points off the top with three games in hand over a Norwich side who have resumed their lead with a 1–0 win over the previous leaders Aston Villa. Manchester United miss the chance to regain the lead of the table when Arsenal hold them to a goalless draw at Old Trafford. Nottingham Forest maintain their survival bid with a 2–1 win at Southampton.

25 March 1993 – Blackburn Rovers sign Chelsea defender Graeme Le Saux for £700,000. Norwich City sign 25-year-old AFC Bournemouth striker Efan Ekoku for £500,000. Blackburn Rovers pay Coventry City £2.5 million for striker Kevin Gallacher, with £1 million-rated Roy Wegerle moving in the opposite direction.

28 March 1993 – Aston Villa's Paul McGrath is voted PFA Players' Player of the Year. The PFA Young Player of the Year award goes to Manchester United's Ryan Giggs for the second year running.

31 March 1993 – England make it four wins from their first five World Cup qualifying matches after defeating Turkey 2–0 away in İzmir. The month ends with Norwich City back on top of the Premier League, though Aston Villa are just a point behind with a match in hand. Manchester United are still close behind, while Blackburn Rovers have three matches in hand on the leaders. Nottingham Forest have slipped back into the relegation zone behind Sheffield United, while Oldham Athletic are still in the relegation zone and Middlesbrough now occupy bottom place. In Division One, Newcastle United still lead the way, though West Ham United have cut their lead down to five points. Portsmouth, Swindon Town, Millwall and Leicester City occupy the playoff zone. A dismal run of form for Tranmere Rovers has taken them from second to seventh place in just three months, and they are now six points outside the playoff zone. A dismal month for Grimsby Town has seen their promotion challenge virtually ended; in fact, they are actually closer to the relegation zone than to sixth place (albeit only by goal difference). Bristol Rovers are six points away from safety and look certain for relegation, but fellow strugglers Southend and Cambridge end March still optimistic of avoiding the drop. In Division Two, Stoke City are ten points clear of second-placed Port Vale and looking all but assured of promotion. Controversial chairman Stan Flashman leaves Division Three leaders Barnet, and as a parting shot sacks and reinstates manager Barry Fry on the same day.

1 April 1993 – Within 24 hours of his latest dismissal and reinstatement at Barnet, Barry Fry finally leaves the troubled North London club to succeed Colin Murphy as manager of Southend United. Fry's assistant Edwin Stein agrees to take charge of the club for the remainder of the season, but makes it clear that he will not continue as manager beyond that.

3 April 1993 – Sheffield Wednesday reach their first FA Cup final in 27 years as they defeat Sheffield United 2–1 at Wembley with goals from Mark Bright and Chris Waddle. United's consolation goal came from Alan Cork. The two teams are led out by Sheffield United's cancer-stricken goalkeeper Mel Rees. Oldham climb out of the relegation zone with a 6–2 home win over Wimbledon, while Middlesbrough remain bottom of the table after crashing to a 4–0 defeat at Chelsea. Blackburn keep their faint title hopes alive with a 4–1 home win over Liverpool.

4 April 1993 – Arsenal and Tottenham Hotspur meet in the FA Cup semi-finals for the second time in three seasons. Arsenal win 1–0, with captain Tony Adams scoring the only goal of the match. Aston Villa return to the top of the Premier League with a 1–0 away win over Nottingham Forest, who miss the chance to climb out of the relegation zone.

5 April 1993 – In a crucial match in the title run-in, Manchester United win 3–1 against Norwich at Carrow Road with goals from Eric Cantona, Ryan Giggs and Andrei Kanchelskis in the first half, with former United striker Mark Robins later reducing Norwich's deficit. United are now one point behind leaders Aston Villa with six games left to play.

6 April 1993 – Middlesbrough boost their survival hopes with a 1–0 home win over Arsenal, as do Sheffield United with a 2–1 home win over Leeds.

7 April 1993 – Blackburn's recent surge continues with a 3–1 away win over Nottingham Forest, as the hosts drop another three points in their bid to avoid relegation.

9 April 1993 – Norwich City's Premier League title hopes are further damaged by a 5–1 defeat at Tottenham Hotspur.

10 April 1993 – Centre-back Steve Bruce scores two late goals to give Manchester United a 2–1 home win over Sheffield Wednesday, putting them top of the table by a point with five games remaining as Aston Villa are held to a goalless draw at home by Coventry. A 4–3 defeat to QPR at Loftus Road pushes Nottingham Forest closer to relegation.

12 April 1993 – Trailing Birmingham City 1–4 after 60 minutes, Swindon Town score five goals in 30 minutes to win 6–4. The Premier League title race sees the top four teams all win. Middlesbrough slide closer to relegation with a 4–1 defeat at Crystal Palace, while a 2–1 home win over Tottenham keeps Nottingham Forest's survival hopes alive. Ian Rush continues his return to form with his seventh league goal in eight matches as Liverpool draw 1–1 with Manchester City at Maine Road.

14 April 1993 – 20-year-old striker Chris Sutton scores a hat-trick for Norwich as a 4–2 home win over Leeds keeps their title hopes alive.

17 April 1993 – Midfielder Mark Walters scores a hat-trick as Liverpool beat Coventry City 4–0 in the Premier League at Anfield. Manchester United remain in pole position with a 3–0 home win over Chelsea, which puts the title mathematically beyond Blackburn's reach despite a 3–1 win at Sheffield United. Liverpool's improvement in form continues with a 4–0 home win over Coventry.

18 April 1993 – Arsenal beat Sheffield Wednesday 2–1 in the League Cup final. Steve Morrow, the scorer of Arsenal's winning goal, breaks his arm in a freak accident during the on-pitch celebrations and would likely miss next month's FA Cup final between the same two teams.

19 April 1993 – Norwich City's 3–1 defeat at Ipswich Town ends their title hopes.

20 April 1993 – Middlesbrough pick up another three valuable points in their bid for Premier League survival, beating Tottenham 3–0 at Ayresome Park.

21 April 1993 – More midweek drama in the Premier League sees Manchester United go four points clear with two games remaining by beating Crystal Palace 2–0 at Selhurst Park, as Aston Villa lose 3–0 to Blackburn at Ewood Park. Liverpool climb to fifth place with a 2–0 home win over Leeds.

24 April 1993 – Newcastle drop off the top of Division One for the first time since September, as new leaders Portsmouth beat Wolves 2–0 at Fratton Park. However, Newcastle are still just one point behind with two games in hand.

25 April 1993 – Newcastle make a quick return to the top of Division One with a 1–0 home win over Sunderland, and now need just two points from their final three games to be sure of promotion.

26 April 1993 – Brian Clough announces that he will retire as Nottingham Forest manager at the end of the season after 18 years in charge.

28 April 1993 – England and the Netherlands draw 2–2 at Wembley in their World Cup qualifier. Stoke City clinch the Division Two title.

30 April 1993 – Former Charlton Athletic defender Tommy Caton dies at his home in Oxfordshire at age 30 after suffering a heart attack, just weeks after retiring from playing following a two-year absence due to injury. As April draws to a close, Manchester United are four points ahead of Aston Villa in the league with two matches remaining. The Division One promotion race is still wide open, with Newcastle United still top and needing just two points from their final three matches to seal promotion. Portsmouth occupy second place and need four points from their final two matches to get promoted, but West Ham United could still overtake them if they managed at least one win and a draw from their next two games. West Ham United, Swindon Town, Leicester City and Tranmere Rovers complete the top six. Millwall are now the only team who can prevent the Wirral side from finishing in the play-off zone and maintaining their challenge to get into the Premier League. Bristol Rovers are mathematically relegated, needing a minimum of ten points as well as a 21-goal swing between them and 21st-placed Sunderland from the remaining two matches, but Cambridge and Brentford are more optimistic of avoiding the drop.

1 May 1993 – Nottingham Forest are relegated from the Premier League after a 2–0 defeat to Sheffield United at the City Ground. Oldham, who also have 40 points but have played fewer games, still have a mathematical chance of survival but need at least six points from their final three games to avoid relegation. Norwich beat Liverpool 1–0 at Carrow Road to move closer to securing third place – which will mean a place in the UEFA Cup if Arsenal win the FA Cup final later this month.

2 May 1993 – Manchester United are confirmed as league champions of England for the first time in 26 years after Aston Villa lose 1–0 at home to Oldham Athletic, which is a big boost for the visiting side's survival hopes.

3 May 1993 – The day after clinching the Premier League title without kicking a ball, Manchester United defeat Blackburn Rovers 3–1 at Old Trafford.

4 May 1993 – Newcastle United seal the Division One title and promotion to the Premier League with a 2–0 win at Grimsby Town. Their local rivals Middlesbrough are relegated from the Premier League due to Sheffield United's 2–0 win at Everton.

5 May 1993 – Oldham Athletic remain in with a slim chance of Premier League survival by achieving a surprise 3–2 home win over Liverpool at Boundary Park.

8 May 1993 – Liverpool's 6–2 home win over Tottenham Hotspur sees them finish sixth. Oldham beat the drop in dramatic fashion with a 4–3 win over Southampton, while Crystal Palace go down in the last relegation place with a 3–0 defeat Arsenal. West Ham seal promotion to the Premier League as Division One runners-up with a 2–0 home win over Cambridge United, who are relegated along with Brentford and Bristol Rovers, having been in the playoffs and on the brink of the Premier League just 12 months ago. Portsmouth miss out on automatic promotion, and go into the playoffs along with Swindon Town, Leicester City and Tranmere Rovers. Millwall lose 3–0 at home to Bristol Rovers in Division One in their last game at The Den; they will move into a new 20,000-seat stadium at the start of next season. Halifax Town, who are bottom of Division Three after a disastrous second half of the season, are relegated from the Football League due to Northampton Town, the only team they could have caught, winning their final game of the season.

9 May 1993 – The last action of the season in Division One sees Newcastle beat Leicester 7–1 at home, with both Andy Cole and David Kelly scoring hat-tricks for the division's champions. Kelly is Newcastle's top scorer with 25 league goals this season, while Cole has scored 12 times in as many games (including two hat-tricks) since his transfer from Bristol City. Meanwhile, some of the last Premier League games see QPR beat runners-up Aston Villa 2–1 at Loftus Road, and champions Manchester United beat Wimbledon 2–1 at Selhurst Park in a game where 36-year-old captain Bryan Robson scores his first league goal in 18 months.

11 May 1993 – The first Premier League season draws to a close with Tottenham winning the North London derby 3–1 at Highbury, and QPR beating Sheffield Wednesday by the same scoreline at Loftus Road.

12 May 1993 – Leyton Orient managing director Frank Clark, a former Nottingham Forest player, returns to the City Ground as the club's new manager.

13 May 1993 – Chris Waddle is voted FWA Footballer of the Year.

14 May 1993 – Tottenham Hotspur chairman Alan Sugar sacks chief executive and former team manager Terry Venables, who helped him take control of the club two years ago. However, Venables is reinstated within hours by a High Court injunction.

15 May 1993 – Arsenal and Sheffield Wednesday draw 1–1 in the FA Cup final. Ian Wright opens the scoring for the North Londoners in the 20th minute, but David Hirst equalises for Trevor Francis's men after 61 minutes.

17 May 1993 – Six days after leaving Chelsea, David Webb is named as the new manager of Brentford, in place of Phil Holder after the West London club's relegation from Division One.

20 May 1993 – Arsenal beat Sheffield Wednesday 2–1 in the FA Cup final replay. Once again, Ian Wright opens the scoring, with a goal in the 34th minute. Chris Waddle equalises in the 68th minute, but with just one minute of extra time remaining, Andy Linighan wins the match with a goal for Arsenal. Steve Coppell resigns after nine years manager of Crystal Palace.

21 May 1993 – Keith Alexander becomes the first permanent black manager of an English league side when he is named as Steve Thompson's successor at Lincoln City.

27 May 1993 – Striker Nigel Clough agrees to join Liverpool from Nottingham Forest in a £2.75 million deal.

28 May 1993 – Wigan Athletic announce Kenny Swain as their new manager following relegation to Division Three.

29 May 1993 – England draw 1–1 with Poland in Katowice, extending their unbeaten run in the World Cup qualifiers to seven games. York City win the Division Three play-off final on penalties over Crewe Alexandra after a 1–1 draw.

30 May 1993 – West Bromwich Albion win the Division Two play-off final and secure promotion to Division One with a 3–0 win over Port Vale. Sheffield United goalkeeper Mel Rees dies of cancer aged 26.

31 May 1993 – Swindon Town are promoted to the top division of English football after 73 years of trying thanks to a 4–3 win over Leicester City in the Division One play-off final.

2 June 1993 – England suffer their first defeat of this World Cup qualifying series, losing 2–0 to Norway in Oslo.

3 June 1993 – Former assistant manager Alan Smith is promoted to role of manager at Crystal Palace. Barnsley recruit 36-year-old defender Viv Anderson from Sheffield Wednesday to become their new player-manager. Neil Warnock ends his tenure at Torquay United, and is replaced by player-assistant manager Don O'Riordan.

4 June 1993 – Glenn Hoddle is named as Chelsea's new manager. Hoddle, 36, will also be registered as a player with the club.

9 June 1993 – Paul Ince becomes England's first black captain in their 2–0 defeat against the United States in Foxborough, Massachusetts.

10 June 1993 – David Kelly, whose 25 Division One goals helped Newcastle United reach the Premier League this season, completes a £750,000 transfer to Wolverhampton Wanderers.

14 June 1993 – Arsenal pay Crystal Palace £1 million for Ireland winger Eddie McGoldrick.

17 June 1993 – Manchester United break the national transfer record by paying Nottingham Forest £3.75 million for Roy Keane.

18 June 1993 – David O'Leary, who has spent his whole career playing for Arsenal, moves to Leeds United on a free transfer.

19 June 1993 – Ossie Ardiles, who won promotion from Division Two as manager of West Bromwich Albion this year, is unveiled as manager of Tottenham Hotspur. His assistant at West Brom, former Spurs boss Keith Burkinshaw, succeeds him.

23 June 1993 – Peter Beardsley signs for Newcastle United in a £1.5 million deal from Everton, six years after he left Tyneside. Nottingham Forest prepare for their promotion push by paying £2.5 million for Southend United striker Stan Collymore.

29 June 1993 – Merthyr Tydfil decide against joining the League of Wales and opt to remain in the GM Vauxhall Conference.

30 June 1993 – Edwin Stein resigns as Barnet manager and follows his predecessor Barry Fry to Southend United, where he becomes assistant manager. Goalkeeper and club captain Gary Phillips is provisionally announced as manager for the following season, though it remains to be seen whether Barnet will even start the next season due to their financial problems.

== Deaths ==
- 11 July 1992 – Ted Fenton, 77, who died from injuries sustained in a Leicestershire car crash, was manager of West Ham United from 1950 to 1961 and had served them as a player from 1932 to 1946.
- 11 December 1992 – Billy Cook, 83, was the last surviving player from Everton's FA Cup winning side of 1933. He was also capped 15 times for Northern Ireland at centre-half.
- 25 December 1992 – Ted Croker, 68, was Secretary of The Football Association from 1973 to 1989. He was the younger brother of footballer Peter Croker, who won the FA Cup with Charlton Athletic in 1947.
- 11 January 1993 – Tommy Walker, 77, played 97 league games at inside-forward for Chelsea in the immediate post World War II years after his transfer from Hearts, where he had been prolific with 192 goals in 170 Scottish league games. He was less prolific south of the border, but after retiring as a player enjoyed huge success back at Hearts as manager, winning no less than seven major trophies between 1951 and 1966.
- 17 February 1993 – Jack Froggatt, 70, forward who won the league with Portsmouth in 1949 and 1950, and was capped 13 times by England.
- 24 February 1993 – Bobby Moore, 51, who captained England to World Cup glory in 1966 as well as winning an FA Cup and Cup Winners' Cup with West Ham, died after a two-year battle against bowel cancer. Just over a week before his death, Moore had given radio commentary on an England game. More than 1,800 people attended a memorial service to Moore at Westminster Abbey on 28 June 1993.
- 3 March 1993 – Tony Bland, 22, who had been in a coma for nearly four years due to injuries suffered in the Hillsborough disaster, became the tragedy's 96th victim when he died following a landmark High Court ruling which allowed treatment to be withdrawn.
- April 1993 – Roy Bailey, 60, former Crystal Palace and Ipswich goalkeeper. Kept goal for Ipswich when they won the league in 1962. Father of Manchester United and England goalkeeper Gary Bailey.
- 30 April 1993 – Tommy Caton, 30, who played for Manchester City, Arsenal, Oxford United and Charlton Athletic. Was on the losing side for Manchester City in the 1981 F.A Cup final. Died following a heart attack in April 1993.
- 30 May 1993 – Mel Rees, 26, Sheffield United goalkeeper, died of cancer. Had previously played for Cardiff City and West Bromwich Albion.
- 8 June 1993 – John Atyeo, 61, who played for Bristol City during the postwar years, scored a club record total of 350 goals in nearly 600 games between 1951 and 1966. He was capped six times at senior level by England during the 1950s, scoring five goals.
