= 1992–93 Football League =

94th season of the Football League

The Football League
- Season: 1992–93
- Champions: Newcastle United
- Promoted: Newcastle United; West Ham United; Swindon Town
- Relegated: Halifax Town
- Folded: Maidstone United
- New club in League: Colchester United

The 1992–93 season was the 94th completed season of the Football League.

This season saw the birth of the Premier League. In 1992, all of the First Division clubs resigned from the Football League and, on 27 May 1992, the FA Premier League was formed as a limited company, which worked out of an office at the Football Association’s then headquarters, Lancaster Gate. Hence, the 104-year-old Football League was reduced from four divisions to three, with the old Second, Third and Fourth Divisions becoming the new First, Second and Third Divisions respectively.

The league was sponsored this season by Barclays.

== Final league tables and results ==
The tables and results below are reproduced here in the exact form that they can be found at The Rec.Sport.Soccer Statistics Foundation website. Play-off results are from the same website.

== First Division ==
First Division
- Season: 1992–93
- Champions: Newcastle United
- Promoted: Newcastle United; West Ham United; Swindon Town
- Relegated: Brentford; Cambridge United; Bristol Rovers
- Matches: 552
- Goals: 1,449 (2.63 per match)
- Top goalscorer: Guy Whittingham (42 goals)

Newcastle United, who won their first 10 league games, clinched the Division One title with an impressive 96 points to end a four-year exile from the top flight of English football. West Ham United sealed an instant return to the top flight a year after relegation, edging ahead of Portsmouth on 'Goals Scored' to finished second. Portsmouth's promotion bid, dominated by the form of 42-goal striker Guy Whittingham, ended in the playoff semi-finals when they were beaten by Leicester City, who prevailed thanks to goals by Ian Ormondroyd and Steve Thompson, the Ormondroyd goal having been offside but missed by the officials. Leicester then went on to lose the final 4–3 to Swindon Town after clawing back from 3–0 down before a late penalty from Paul Bodin saw Swindon clinch victory and a place in the top flight for the first time ever. The other losing semi-finalists in the playoffs were Tranmere Rovers, playing only their second season at this level in the postwar era.

Millwall finished one place outside the playoff zone in the first season in management for Mick McCarthy, while pre-season promotion favourites Derby County could only manage an eighth-place finish despite having spent millions on new players over the previous two years. Unfancied Grimsby Town and Peterborough United finished in the top half of the table, comfortably above bigger clubs like Wolverhampton Wanderers and Birmingham City.

Luton Town and Notts County, newly relegated from the top flight, spent the season battling at the wrong end of the division but managed to avoid a second successive relegation, as did a Sunderland side who had been FA Cup finalists one season earlier and members of the top flight two seasons earlier.

Bristol Rovers went down in bottom place after a dismal season. Cambridge United, playoff semi-finalists the previous season, struggled after the sale of Dion Dublin and went down on the last day of the season, as did a Brentford side who had been on the fringe of the playoff places at Christmas before a slump in form during the second half of the season cost the Bees their Division One status and manager Phil Holder his job.

Pos	Team	Pld	W	D	L	GF	GA	GD	Pts	Qualification or relegation
1	Newcastle United (C, P)	46	29	9	8	92	38	+54	96	Promotion to the Premier League
2	West Ham United (P)	46	26	10	10	81	41	+40	88	Promotion to the Premier League
3	Portsmouth	46	26	10	10	80	46	+34	88	Qualification for the First Division play-offs
4	Tranmere Rovers	46	23	10	13	72	56	+16	79	Qualification for the First Division play-offs
5	Swindon Town (O, P)	46	21	13	12	74	59	+15	76	Qualification for the First Division play-offs
6	Leicester City	46	22	10	14	71	64	+7	76	Qualification for the First Division play-offs
7	Millwall	46	18	16	12	65	53	+12	70	
8	Derby County	46	19	9	18	68	57	+11	66	
9	Grimsby Town	46	19	7	20	58	57	+1	64	
10	Peterborough United	46	16	14	16	55	63	−8	62	
11	Wolverhampton Wanderers	46	16	13	17	57	56	+1	61	
12	Charlton Athletic	46	16	13	17	49	46	+3	61	
13	Barnsley	46	17	9	20	56	60	−4	60	
14	Oxford United	46	14	14	18	53	56	−3	56	
15	Bristol City	46	14	14	18	49	67	−18	56	
16	Watford	46	14	13	19	57	71	−14	55	
17	Notts County	46	12	16	18	55	70	−15	52	
18	Southend United	46	13	13	20	54	64	−10	52	
19	Birmingham City	46	13	12	21	50	72	−22	51	
20	Luton Town	46	10	21	15	48	62	−14	51	
21	Sunderland	46	13	11	22	50	64	−14	50	
22	Brentford (R)	46	13	10	23	52	71	−19	49	Relegation to the Second Division
23	Cambridge United (R)	46	11	16	19	48	69	−21	49	Relegation to the Second Division
24	Bristol Rovers (R)	46	10	11	25	55	87	−32	41	Relegation to the Second Division

Source: rsssf.com
Rules for classification: 1) Points; 2) Goals scored; 3) Goal difference
(C) Champions; (O) Play-off winners; (P) Promoted; (R) Relegated

=== Results ===
Home \ Away	BAR	BIR	BRE	BRI	BRR	CAM	CHA	DER	GRI	LEI	LUT	MIL	NEW	NTC	OXF	PET	POR	STD	SUN	SWI	TRA	WAT	WHU	WOL
Barnsley		1–0	3–2	2–1	2–1	2–0	1–0	1–1	0–2	2–3	3–0	0–0	1–0	0–0	0–1	1–2	1–1	3–1	2–0	1–0	3–1	0–1	0–1	0–1
Birmingham City	3–0		1–3	0–1	2–1	0–2	1–0	1–1	2–1	0–2	2–1	0–0	2–3	1–0	1–0	2–0	2–3	2–0	1–0	4–6	0–0	2–2	1–2	0–4
Brentford	3–1	0–2		5–1	0–3	0–1	2–0	2–1	1–3	1–3	1–2	1–1	1–2	2–2	1–0	0–1	4–1	2–1	1–1	0–0	0–1	1–1	0–0	0–2
Bristol City	2–1	3–0	4–1		2–1	0–0	2–1	0–0	1–0	2–1	0–0	0–1	1–2	1–0	1–1	0–1	3–3	0–1	0–0	2–2	1–3	2–1	1–5	1–0
Bristol Rovers	1–5	3–3	2–1	4–0		1–1	0–2	1–2	0–3	0–0	2–0	1–0	1–2	3–3	0–1	3–1	1–2	0–2	2–2	3–4	1–0	0–3	0–4	1–1
Cambridge United	1–2	0–3	1–0	2–1	0–1		0–1	1–3	2–0	1–3	3–3	1–1	0–3	3–0	2–2	2–2	0–1	3–1	2–1	1–0	0–1	1–1	2–1	1–1
Charlton Athletic	0–0	0–0	1–0	2–1	4–1	0–0		2–1	3–1	2–0	0–0	0–2	1–3	2–1	1–1	0–1	1–0	1–1	0–1	2–0	2–2	3–1	1–1	0–1
Derby County	3–0	3–1	3–2	3–4	3–1	0–0	4–3		2–1	2–0	1–1	1–2	1–2	2–0	0–1	2–3	2–4	2–0	0–1	2–1	1–2	1–2	0–2	2–0
Grimsby Town	4–2	1–1	0–1	2–1	2–0	1–1	1–0	0–2		1–3	3–1	1–0	0–2	3–3	1–1	1–3	3–0	1–0	1–0	2–1	0–0	3–2	1–1	1–0
Leicester City	2–1	2–1	0–0	0–0	0–1	2–2	3–1	3–2	3–0		2–1	3–0	2–1	1–1	2–1	0–2	1–0	4–1	3–2	4–2	0–1	5–2	1–2	0–0
Luton Town	2–2	1–1	0–0	0–3	1–1	2–0	1–0	1–3	1–4	2–0		1–1	0–0	0–0	3–1	0–0	1–4	2–2	0–0	0–0	3–3	2–0	2–0	1–1
Millwall	0–4	0–0	6–1	4–1	0–3	2–2	1–0	1–0	2–1	2–0	1–0		1–2	6–0	3–1	4–0	1–1	1–1	0–0	2–1	0–0	5–2	2–1	2–0
Newcastle United	6–0	2–2	5–1	5–0	0–0	4–1	2–2	1–1	0–1	7–1	2–0	1–1		4–0	2–1	3–0	3–1	3–2	1–0	0–0	1–0	2–0	2–0	2–1
Notts County	1–3	3–1	1–1	0–0	3–0	1–0	2–0	0–2	1–0	1–1	0–0	1–2	0–2		1–1	1–0	0–1	4–0	3–1	1–1	5–1	1–2	1–0	2–2
Oxford United	0–0	0–0	0–2	2–0	2–1	3–0	0–1	0–1	0–1	0–0	4–0	3–0	4–2	1–1		2–1	5–5	0–1	0–1	0–1	1–2	1–1	1–0	0–0
Peterborough United	1–1	2–1	0–0	1–1	1–1	1–0	1–1	1–0	1–0	3–0	2–3	0–0	0–1	1–3	1–1		1–1	1–0	5–2	3–3	1–1	0–0	1–3	2–3
Portsmouth	1–0	4–0	1–0	2–3	4–1	3–0	1–0	3–0	2–1	1–1	2–1	1–0	2–0	0–0	3–0	4–0		2–0	2–0	3–1	4–0	1–0	0–1	2–0
Southend United	3–0	4–0	3–0	1–1	3–0	1–1	0–2	0–0	1–0	3–1	2–1	3–3	1–1	3–1	0–3	0–1	0–0		0–1	1–1	1–2	1–2	1–0	1–1
Sunderland	2–1	1–2	1–3	0–0	1–1	3–3	0–2	1–0	2–0	1–2	2–2	2–0	1–2	2–2	2–0	3–0	4–1	2–4		0–1	1–0	1–2	0–0	2–0
Swindon Town	1–0	0–0	0–2	2–1	2–2	4–1	2–2	2–4	1–0	1–1	1–0	3–0	2–1	5–1	2–2	1–0	1–0	3–2	1–0		2–0	3–1	1–3	1–0
Tranmere Rovers	2–1	4–0	3–2	3–0	2–1	2–0	0–0	2–1	1–1	2–3	0–2	1–1	0–3	3–1	4–0	1–1	0–2	3–0	2–1	3–1		2–1	5–2	3–0
Watford	1–2	1–0	1–0	0–0	4–2	2–2	1–1	0–0	2–3	0–3	0–0	3–1	1–0	1–3	0–1	1–2	0–0	0–0	2–1	0–4	3–2		1–2	3–1
West Ham United	1–1	3–1	4–0	2–0	2–1	2–0	0–1	1–1	2–1	3–0	2–2	2–2	0–0	2–0	5–3	2–1	2–0	2–0	6–0	0–1	2–0	2–1		3–1
Wolverhampton Wanderers	1–0	2–1	1–2	0–0	5–1	1–2	2–1	0–2	2–1	3–0	1–2	3–1	1–0	3–0	0–1	4–3	1–1	1–1	2–1	2–2	0–2	2–2	0–0	

Legend: Blue = home team win; Yellow = draw; Red = away team win.

=== Play-offs ===
Semi-finals; 1st leg – 16 May; 2nd leg – 19 May 1993
3rd	Portsmouth	0	2	2
6th	Leicester City	1	2	3
4th	Tranmere Rovers	1	3	4
5th	Swindon Town	3	2	5

Final at Wembley; 31 May 1993
5th	Swindon Town	4
6th	Leicester City	3

=== Maps ===
Locations of the First Division teams
Locations of the London-based First Division teams

=== Attendances ===
#	Football club	Home games	Average attendance
1	Newcastle United	23	29,018
2	Sunderland	23	17,258
3	West Ham United	23	16,001
4	Leicester City	23	15,362
5	Derby County	23	15,020
6	Portsmouth	23	13,706
7	Wolverhampton Wanderers	23	13,598
8	Birmingham City	23	12,328
9	Bristol City	23	11,004
10	Swindon Town	23	10,716
11	Millwall FC	23	9,188
12	Brentford FC	23	8,476
13	Watford FC	23	8,275
14	Luton Town	23	8,212
15	Notts County	23	8,151
16	Tranmere Rovers	23	8,071
17	Peterborough United	23	8,064
18	Charlton Athletic	23	7,029
19	Barnsley FC	23	6,415
20	Oxford United	23	6,356
21	Grimsby Town	23	6,088
22	Bristol Rovers	23	5,745
23	Cambridge United	23	5,545
24	Southend United	23	5,396

== Second Division ==
Second Division
- Season: 1992–93
- Champions: Stoke City
- Promoted: Stoke City; Bolton Wanderers; West Bromwich Albion
- Relegated: Preston North End; Mansfield Town; Wigan Athletic; Chester City
- Matches: 463
- Goals: 1,479 (3.19 per match)
- Top goalscorer: Bob Taylor (30 goals)

Stoke City sealed promotion as Division Two champions in Lou Macari's second season as manager, having topped the table for most of the season, as did Bolton Wanderers under their new manager Bruce Rioch. The third promotion place went to playoff winners West Bromwich Albion, who beat Port Vale 3–0 in the Wembley promotion decider to secure their first promotion for 17 years and end their two-year spell in the league's third tier, as well as recording a first Wembley victory for 25 years.

Swansea City and Stockport County were the losing semi-finalists.

Leyton Orient missed out on the playoff places as they had scored fewer goals than Stockport. Managing director and former manager Frank Clark then left the club after accepting the offer to return to Nottingham Forest as manager as successor to Brian Clough.

Chester City's first season at the new Deva Stadium saw them relegated in bottom place and also spelled the end of Harry McNally's seven-year reign as manager in October, with his successor Mike Pejic being unable to steer the club to safety. Wigan Athletic finished second from bottom and suffered their first relegation as a Football League side. Mansfield Town finished third from bottom and suffered an immediate return to the league's fourth tier. The final relegation place went to Preston North End, who had replaced Les Chapman with John Beck as manager in October, but not even the man who was fresh from a successful spell in charge of Cambridge United could save the Lancashire side from relegation. Hull City narrowly avoided a second relegation in three seasons, while once again England World Cup winner Alan Ball was able to guide Exeter City to safety.

Pos	Team	Pld	W	D	L	GF	GA	GD	Pts	Qualification or relegation
1	Stoke City (C, P)	46	27	12	7	73	34	+39	93	Promotion to the First Division
2	Bolton Wanderers (P)	46	27	9	10	80	41	+39	90	Promotion to the First Division
3	Port Vale	46	26	11	9	79	44	+35	89	Qualification for the Second Division play-offs
4	West Bromwich Albion (O, P)	46	25	10	11	88	54	+34	85	Qualification for the Second Division play-offs
5	Swansea City	46	20	13	13	65	47	+18	73	Qualification for the Second Division play-offs
6	Stockport County	46	19	15	12	81	57	+24	72	Qualification for the Second Division play-offs
7	Leyton Orient	46	21	9	16	69	53	+16	72	
8	Reading	46	18	15	13	66	51	+15	69	
9	Brighton & Hove Albion	46	20	9	17	63	59	+4	69	
10	Bradford City	46	18	14	14	69	67	+2	68	
11	Rotherham United	46	17	14	15	60	60	0	65	
12	Fulham	46	16	17	13	57	55	+2	65	
13	Burnley	46	15	16	15	57	59	−2	61	
14	Plymouth Argyle	46	16	12	18	59	64	−5	60	
15	Huddersfield Town	46	17	9	20	54	61	−7	60	
16	Hartlepool United	46	14	12	20	42	60	−18	54	
17	Bournemouth	46	12	17	17	45	52	−7	53	
18	Blackpool	46	12	15	19	63	75	−12	51	
19	Exeter City	46	11	17	18	54	69	−15	50	
20	Hull City	46	13	11	22	46	69	−23	50	
21	Preston North End (R)	46	13	8	25	65	94	−29	47	Relegation to the Third Division
22	Mansfield Town (R)	46	11	11	24	52	80	−28	44	Relegation to the Third Division
23	Wigan Athletic (R)	46	10	11	25	43	72	−29	41	Relegation to the Third Division
24	Chester City (R)	46	8	5	33	49	102	−53	29	Relegation to the Third Division

Rules for classification: 1) Points; 2) Goals scored; 3) Goal difference
(C) Champions; (O) Play-off winners; (P) Promoted; (R) Relegated

=== Results ===
Home \ Away	BOU	BLP	BOL	BRA	B&HA	BUR	CHE	EXE	FUL	HAR	HUD	HUL	LEY	MAN	PLY	PTV	PNE	REA	ROT	STP	STK	SWA	WBA	WIG
AFC Bournemouth		5–1	1–2	1–1	1–1	1–1	0–0	1–3	2–1	0–2	1–1	0–0	3–0	4–1	1–3	2–1	2–1	1–1	0–0	1–0	1–1	0–2	0–1	0–0
Blackpool	2–0		1–1	3–3	2–2	1–3	2–0	2–0	1–1	1–1	2–2	5–1	3–1	1–1	1–1	2–4	2–3	0–1	2–0	2–0	1–3	0–0	2–1	2–1
Bolton Wanderers	1–1	3–0		5–0	0–1	4–0	5–0	4–1	1–0	1–2	2–0	2–0	1–0	2–1	3–1	1–1	1–0	2–1	2–0	2–1	1–0	3–1	0–2	2–1
Bradford City	0–1	2–0	2–1		1–1	1–0	3–1	3–1	3–2	0–2	0–1	1–2	1–0	0–0	0–0	3–2	4–0	3–0	0–3	2–3	3–1	0–0	2–2	2–1
Brighton & Hove Albion	1–0	1–1	2–1	1–1		3–0	3–2	3–0	0–2	1–1	2–1	2–0	1–3	3–1	2–1	0–2	2–0	0–1	1–2	2–0	2–2	0–2	3–1	1–0
Burnley	1–1	2–2	0–1	2–2	1–3		5–0	3–1	5–2	3–0	2–1	2–0	2–0	1–0	0–0	1–1	2–0	1–1	1–1	1–1	0–2	1–0	2–1	0–1
Chester City	1–0	1–2	2–2	2–5	2–1	3–0		0–3	2–3	1–0	0–2	3–0	1–3	1–2	1–2	1–2	2–4	0–3	1–2	0–3	1–1	3–2	1–3	1–2
Exeter City	1–1	0–1	1–3	0–1	2–3	2–2	2–0		1–2	3–1	1–2	1–1	1–0	2–0	2–0	1–1	0–1	0–0	0–2	2–2	2–2	0–2	2–3	0–0
Fulham	1–1	1–0	1–4	1–1	2–0	4–0	1–0	1–1		1–3	0–1	3–3	1–0	0–0	3–1	1–2	2–1	0–0	0–1	2–1	0–0	1–1	1–1	1–0
Hartlepool United	0–1	1–0	0–2	2–0	2–0	0–0	2–0	1–3	0–3		1–0	1–0	0–2	0–1	1–0	1–1	0–0	1–1	0–2	3–2	1–2	0–1	2–2	0–0
Huddersfield Town	0–1	5–2	1–1	1–2	1–2	1–1	0–2	0–0	1–0	3–0		3–0	1–1	2–1	2–1	1–2	1–0	0–0	1–1	2–1	1–0	1–2	0–1	2–1
Hull City	3–0	3–2	1–2	0–2	1–0	0–2	1–1	4–0	1–1	3–2	2–3		0–0	1–0	2–0	0–1	2–4	1–1	0–1	0–2	1–0	1–0	1–2	0–0
Leyton Orient	1–0	1–0	1–0	4–2	3–2	3–2	4–3	5–0	0–0	0–0	4–1	0–0		5–1	2–0	0–1	3–1	1–2	1–1	3–0	1–0	4–2	2–0	1–2
Mansfield Town	0–2	2–2	1–1	5–2	1–3	1–1	2–0	0–0	2–3	2–0	1–2	3–1	3–0		0–0	0–1	2–2	1–1	1–3	2–0	0–4	3–3	0–3	2–0
Plymouth Argyle	2–1	2–1	2–1	3–0	3–2	1–2	2–0	0–3	1–1	2–2	1–3	0–0	2–0	3–2		0–1	4–0	2–2	2–1	3–4	1–1	0–1	0–0	2–0
Port Vale	3–0	2–1	0–0	1–2	3–1	3–0	2–0	2–2	0–0	2–0	1–0	1–1	2–0	3–0	4–0		2–2	3–1	4–2	0–0	0–2	2–0	2–1	2–2
Preston North End	1–1	3–3	2–2	3–2	1–0	2–0	4–3	2–2	1–2	0–2	2–1	1–2	1–4	1–5	1–2	2–5		2–0	5–2	2–3	1–2	1–3	1–1	2–0
Reading	3–2	0–0	1–2	1–1	3–0	1–0	1–0	2–3	3–0	2–0	2–1	1–2	1–1	3–1	3–0	1–0	4–0		3–1	2–4	0–1	2–0	1–1	4–0
Rotherham United	1–2	3–2	2–1	2–0	1–0	0–1	3–3	1–1	1–1	0–0	1–0	0–1	1–1	2–0	2–2	4–1	1–0	3–2		0–2	0–2	0–0	0–2	2–3
Stockport County	0–0	0–0	2–0	2–2	0–0	2–1	2–0	2–2	0–0	4–1	5–0	5–3	1–1	0–1	3–0	2–0	3–0	2–2	2–2		1–1	1–1	5–1	3–0
Stoke City	2–0	0–1	0–0	1–0	1–1	1–1	4–0	1–1	1–0	0–1	3–0	3–0	2–1	4–0	1–0	2–1	1–0	2–0	2–0	2–1		2–1	4–3	2–1
Swansea City	2–1	3–0	1–2	1–1	0–1	1–1	4–2	0–0	2–2	3–0	3–0	1–0	0–1	4–0	0–0	2–0	2–0	2–1	2–0	2–2	1–2		0–0	2–1
West Bromwich Albion	2–1	3–1	3–1	1–1	3–1	2–0	2–0	2–0	4–0	3–1	2–2	3–1	2–0	2–0	2–5	0–1	3–2	3–0	2–2	3–0	1–2	3–0		5–1
Wigan Athletic	0–0	2–1	0–2	1–2	1–2	1–1	1–2	0–1	1–3	2–2	1–0	2–0	3–1	2–0	0–2	0–4	2–3	1–1	1–1	1–2	1–1	2–3	1–0	

Legend: Blue = home team win; Yellow = draw; Red = away team win.

=== Play-offs ===
Semi-finals; 1st leg – 16 May; 2nd leg – 19 May 1993
3rd	Port Vale	1	1	2
6th	Stockport County	1	0	1
4th	West Bromwich Albion	1	2	3
5th	Swansea City	2	0	2

Final at Wembley; 30 May 1993
3rd	Port Vale	0
4th	West Bromwich Albion	3

=== Maps ===
Locations of the Second Division teams
Locations of the London-based Second Division teams

== Third Division ==
Third Division
- Season: 1992–93
- Champions: Cardiff City (1st fourth tier title)
- Promoted: Barnet; Cardiff City; Wrexham
- Promoted through play-offs: York City
- Relegated: Halifax Town
- Folded: Maidstone United
- New club in League: Colchester United
- Matches: 462
- Goals: 1,311 (2.84 per match)
- Top goalscorer: Darren Foreman (Scarborough), 27; Carl Griffiths (Shrewsbury Town), 27

The season began with the demise of Maidstone United, who had only reached the Football League three years earlier and were hundreds of thousands of pounds in debt, having been tenants at Dartford since 1988 and having been refused planning permission to build a new stadium on land in Maidstone which had since been purchased. A move to relocate the club to the North-East and merge the with non-league Newcastle Blue Star was vetoed by the Football League, and as the season dawned the club had just two players still registered. Their first league game of the new Division Three season was cancelled and they were given until the following Monday to guarantee that they would be able to fulfill their fixtures. Unable to come up with the necessary backing, they resigned from the league and went into liquidation on 17 August.

As the Division Three campaign got underway, the two Welsh based sides in the division emerged as the pace-setters, with Cardiff City finishing as champions and Wrexham as runners-up. Barnet, who had spent much of the season under threat of going the same way as Maidstone due to mounting debts, being banned from the transfer market for failing to pay staff wages, and being threatened with expulsion from the Football League over an unpaid fine, clinched the final automatic promotion place in only their second season in the Football League. The season also brought the end of Stan Flashman's eight-year ownership of the club, when he resigned as chairman of the club he had paid £50,000 to save from receivership in 1985. Just before promotion was clinched, manager Barry Fry left to take charge of Southend United, with his assistant Edwin Stein overseeing the final few games of the season before goalkeeper Gary Phillips took over as player-manager for the 1993–94 season.

Halifax Town, after 72 years of league membership, finished bottom of the league and were replaced by Conference champions Wycombe Wanderers. Maidstone United went out of business on 17 August after their first game was postponed, and were not replaced.

Pos	Team	Pld	W	D	L	GF	GA	GD	Pts	Promotion or relegation
1	Cardiff City (C, P)	42	25	8	9	77	47	+30	83	Cup Winners' Cup first round and promotion to the Second Division
2	Wrexham (P)	42	23	11	8	75	52	+23	80	Promotion to the Second Division
3	Barnet (P)	42	23	10	9	66	48	+18	79	Promotion to the Second Division
4	York City (O, P)	42	21	12	9	72	45	+27	75	Qualification for the Third Division play-offs
5	Walsall	42	22	7	13	76	61	+15	73	Qualification for the Third Division play-offs
6	Crewe Alexandra	42	21	7	14	75	56	+19	70	Qualification for the Third Division play-offs
7	Bury	42	18	9	15	63	55	+8	63	Qualification for the Third Division play-offs
8	Lincoln City	42	18	9	15	57	53	+4	63	
9	Shrewsbury Town	42	17	11	14	57	52	+5	62	
10	Colchester United	42	18	5	19	67	76	−9	59	
11	Rochdale	42	16	10	16	70	70	0	58	
12	Chesterfield	42	15	11	16	59	63	−4	56	
13	Scarborough	42	15	9	18	66	71	−5	54	
14	Scunthorpe United	42	14	12	16	57	54	+3	54	
15	Darlington	42	12	14	16	48	53	−5	50	
16	Doncaster Rovers	42	11	14	17	42	57	−15	47	
17	Hereford United	42	10	15	17	47	60	−13	45	
18	Carlisle United	42	11	11	20	51	65	−14	44	
19	Torquay United	42	12	7	23	45	67	−22	43	
20	Northampton Town	42	11	8	23	48	74	−26	41	
21	Gillingham	42	9	13	20	48	64	−16	40	
22	Halifax Town (R)	42	9	9	24	45	68	−23	36	Relegation to Football Conference
23	Maidstone United	0	0	0	0	0	0	0	0 (Note: Maidstone United resigned from the Football League on 17 August 1992, and subsequently folded. At the time of their resignation, they had played no matches.)	Club folded

(C) Champions; (O) Play-off winners; (P) Promoted; (R) Relegated

=== Results ===
Home \ Away	BAR	BRY	CAR	CRL	CHF	COL	CRE	DAR	DON	GIL	HAL	HER	LIN	NOR	ROC	SCA	SCU	SHR	TOR	WAL	WRE	YOR
Barnet		1–0	2–1	2–0	2–1	3–1	3–2	0–0	2–0	2–0	0–0	2–0	1–1	3–0	2–0	3–1	3–0	2–2	5–4	3–0	3–1	1–5
Bury	0–0		1–0	6–0	3–0	3–2	1–2	1–1	3–0	1–0	1–2	2–0	1–2	3–3	2–2	0–2	0–0	0–0	2–0	2–1	3–1	1–1
Cardiff City	1–1	3–0		2–2	2–1	3–1	1–1	0–0	1–1	3–1	2–1	2–1	3–1	2–1	1–1	1–0	3–0	2–1	4–0	2–1	1–2	3–3
Carlisle United	0–1	5–1	1–2		3–1	0–2	1–3	2–2	1–1	1–0	1–1	0–0	2–0	2–0	3–0	2–2	0–2	1–0	0–1	3–4	0–2	1–2
Chesterfield	1–2	2–1	2–1	1–0		4–0	2–1	2–0	0–0	1–1	2–1	1–0	2–1	1–3	2–3	0–3	1–2	2–4	1–0	2–1	2–3	1–1
Colchester United	1–2	0–0	2–4	2–1	3–0		3–2	0–3	2–0	3–0	2–1	3–1	2–1	2–0	4–4	1–0	1–0	0–2	2–0	3–1	2–4	0–0
Crewe Alexandra	4–1	2–1	2–0	4–0	0–2	7–1		1–0	4–0	3–1	2–1	1–1	1–2	3–2	1–1	2–3	1–0	2–2	4–2	0–1	0–1	3–1
Darlington	1–0	0–0	0–2	1–1	1–1	1–0	3–0		1–2	1–1	0–3	0–1	1–3	3–1	0–4	2–3	2–2	0–2	4–1	1–2	1–1	0–1
Doncaster Rovers	2–1	2–3	0–1	1–2	2–1	1–0	1–1	0–1		1–0	0–1	2–1	0–0	2–2	1–1	4–3	0–1	0–1	2–3	0–3	1–1	0–1
Gillingham	1–1	1–4	0–1	1–0	0–0	0–1	1–2	3–1	1–1		2–0	3–1	3–1	2–3	4–2	3–1	1–1	1–0	0–2	0–1	4–1	1–4
Halifax Town	1–2	0–1	0–1	0–2	1–1	2–4	1–2	1–0	2–2	2–0		0–1	2–1	2–2	2–3	3–4	0–0	1–1	0–2	0–4	0–1	0–1
Hereford United	1–1	3–1	1–1	1–0	1–3	3–1	0–1	1–1	0–2	3–1	3–0		0–2	3–2	1–1	1–1	2–2	1–1	3–1	1–3	1–1	1–1
Lincoln City	4–1	1–2	3–2	2–1	1–1	1–1	1–1	2–0	2–1	1–1	2–1	2–0		2–0	1–2	3–0	1–0	0–1	2–2	0–2	0–0	0–1
Northampton Town	1–1	1–0	1–2	2–0	0–1	1–0	0–2	1–2	0–1	2–2	2–5	1–1	0–2		1–0	1–3	1–0	0–0	0–1	0–0	0–2	4–3
Rochdale	0–1	1–2	1–2	2–2	2–1	5–2	0–1	3–1	1–1	1–1	2–3	1–3	5–1	0–3		3–0	2–0	2–0	1–0	4–3	1–2	1–0
Scarborough	2–2	1–3	1–3	2–2	2–2	0–1	1–0	0–3	1–1	1–1	2–0	2–0	0–1	4–2	1–1		1–2	1–2	1–0	4–1	1–1	4–2
Scunthorpe United	2–0	2–0	0–3	0–0	0–1	3–1	3–3	1–3	0–1	2–2	4–1	3–1	1–1	5–0	5–1	1–2		1–1	2–2	2–0	0–0	1–2
Shrewsbury Town	1–0	2–0	3–2	2–3	2–2	4–3	4–1	1–2	2–1	2–1	1–0	1–1	3–2	2–3	1–2	2–0	2–1		0–1	0–3	0–1	1–1
Torquay United	0–1	0–1	2–1	0–2	2–2	2–2	1–2	0–2	1–2	2–1	2–0	0–0	1–2	1–0	0–2	1–3	0–1	1–0		0–1	1–1	1–0
Walsall	2–0	4–3	2–3	2–1	3–2	1–3	1–0	2–2	3–1	1–1	1–2	1–1	1–2	2–0	3–1	3–2	3–2	1–1	2–2		1–1	3–1
Wrexham	2–3	4–2	0–2	3–1	5–4	4–3	2–0	1–1	1–1	2–0	1–1	2–0	2–0	0–1	3–1	4–1	0–2	2–0	4–2	3–1		3–0
York City	2–0	1–2	3–1	2–2	0–0	2–0	3–1	0–0	1–1	1–1	1–1	4–2	2–0	2–1	3–0	1–0	5–1	2–0	2–1	0–1	4–0	

Legend: Blue = home team win; Yellow = draw; Red = away team win.

=== Play-offs ===
Semi-finals; 1st leg – 16 May; 2nd leg – 19 May 1993
4th	York City	0	1	1
7th	Bury	0	0	0
5th	Walsall	1	2	3
6th	Crewe Alexandra	5	4	9

Final at Wembley; 29 May 1993
4th	York City (pens.)	1 (5)
6th	Crewe Alexandra	1 (3)

=== Maps ===
Locations of the Third Division teams
Locations of the London-based Third Division teams

== See also ==
- 1992–93 in English football
