= Ed Stein =

Ed Stein may refer to:

- Ed Stein (baseball) (1869–1928), Major League Baseball player
- Ed Stein (footballer), South African-born English former football player and coach
- Ed Stein (cartoonist) (born 1946), American cartoonist and former editorial cartoonist
