= Darren Foreman (footballer) =

English footballer

Personal information
- Full name: Darren Foreman
- Date of birth: 12 February 1968 (age 58)
- Place of birth: Southampton, England
- Height: 5 ft 10 in (1.78 m)
- Position: Striker

Youth career
- Fareham Town

Senior career*
Years	Team	Apps	(Gls)
1986–1990	Barnsley	47	(8)
1990–1991	Crewe Alexandra	23	(4)
1991–1995	Scarborough	97	(35)
1995	IK Sirius	22	(12)
1996	Gateshead	9	(2)
- Guiseley
- Barrow
Total		198	(61)
- * Club domestic league appearances and goals

Darren Foreman (born 12 February 1968) is an English former footballer.

== Career ==
He played for Fareham Town, Barnsley, Crewe Alexandra and Scarborough.

Foreman is Scarborough's all-time top goalscorer in the Football League with 35 goals (they were a Football League team from 1987 to 1999), 27 of which were scored in the 1992–93 season. However, he suffered a career-ending injury soon afterwards, although he did continue playing at non-league level. After the end of his professional career, he played for several non-league clubs, including Gateshead, Guiseley, and Barrow, before rejoining Scarborough to serve in a number of non-playing roles. He also played 22 games (12 goals) for IK Sirius, Uppsala in Sweden in 1995.

== Honours ==
Individual

- PFA Team of the Year: 1992–93 Third Division
