= Endsleigh Insurance =

UK based insurance company

Endsleigh Insurance Services Limited
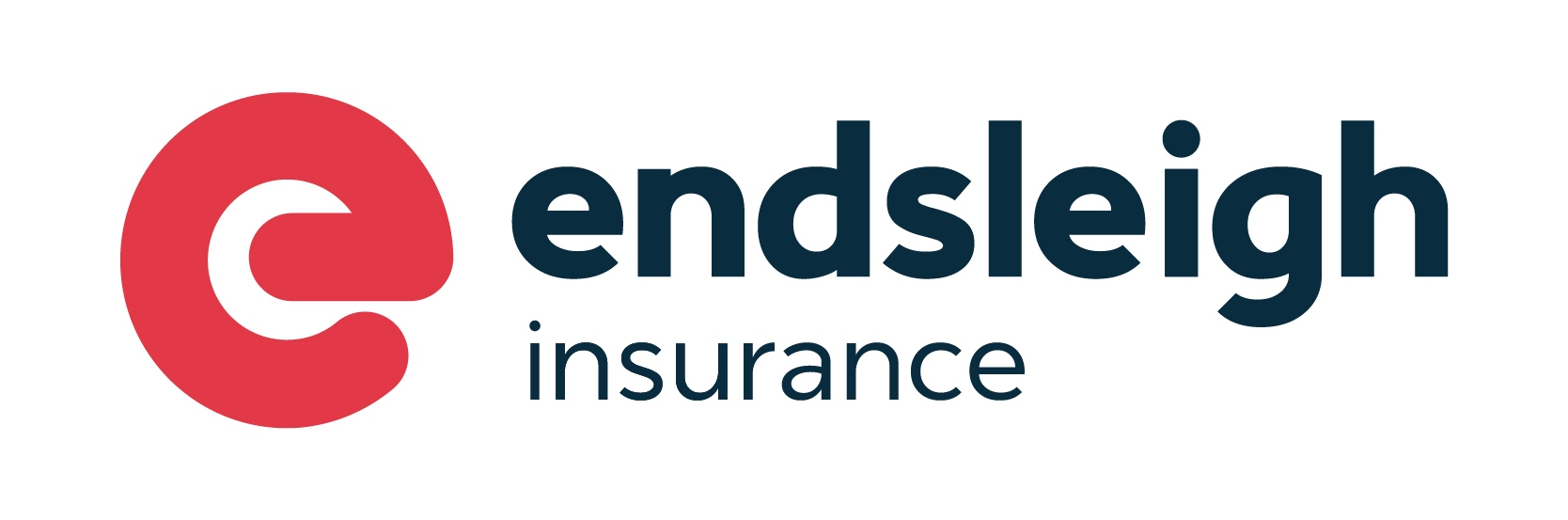
- Industry: Insurance
- Founded: 1965
- Headquarters: Cheltenham, United Kingdom
- Products: Student insurance, Car Insurance, Home insurance, Landlord insurance, Travel insurance, Business insurance, Charity insurance, Student Union Insurance
- Parent: HOWDEN
- Website: www.endsleigh.co.uk

Endsleigh Insurance was a British insurance intermediary based in Cheltenham, specialising in the student, education, graduate and sport markets. It is the preferred insurer for several unions and professional associations.

It was bought by HOWDEN in 2021 and completed its merge on the 15th of October 2024, with all staff transferred to HOWDEN to continue offering the same expertise and level of care.

Endsleigh was established in 1965 by National Union of Students (NUS).

In March 2018, Endsleigh was acquired by A-Plan Holdings, and is the only official and approved insurer of National Union of Students.

== History ==
Conceived by the former University of Nottingham student Michael Jeremy Naylor, Endsleigh was founded by National Union of Students (NUS) in 1965 to provide tailored insurance services to university and college students. It was named after Endsleigh Street in Bloomsbury, on the Duke of Bedford's Bedford Estate where the NUS had its headquarters at the time. With Mike Naylor as its managing director, it then expanded into the graduate and professionals markets. Since its founding it has been the only insurer recommended by the NUS and is now the preferred insurance supplier for many professional associations, including the National Association of Schoolmasters Union of Women Teachers (NASUWT) and the University and College Union (UCU).

In 1970 Endsleigh moved from its London headquarters to Cheltenham.

In 1976 the NUS sold 100% of the company to Gouda Insurance International, as it was felt a stronger financial base was needed to fully exploit market opportunities. The NUS retained two seats on the board and in 1982 bought back a 14% shareholding. In July 1995, Endsleigh's founder and still driving influence, Mike Naylor, was killed in a car crash in Southern France at the age of 59.

From 1993 to 1996, Endsleigh sponsored the English Football League. From 1988 to 1999 Endsleigh was the main shirt sponsor for Burnley F.C., with its logo appearing on the players' shirts, and it did the same for Cheltenham Town F.C. from 1997 to 1999. In the late 1990s to early 2000s, a club called Endsleigh, later known as EFC Cheltenham, played in the Hellenic Football League.

=== Zurich ===
In April 2002, a management buyout, led by the managing director, Mike Alcock, bought out Gouda and formed a partnership with Zurich Financial Services.

The company moved into the business market in 2000, and this combined with a 25% increase in customer base helped profits leap from £2.5m in 2000 to £8.6m in 2003. In February 2005 the 'Sunday Times PricewaterhouseCoopers Profit Track 100' rated Endsleigh as the 76th fastest growing company in the UK, at 52% a year.

In January 2007, Zurich acquired 100% shareholding. As of 1 September 2008, Endsleigh discontinued operating its local branch service (which was made up of 119 UK Branches). This was followed in early 2011 by the closure of the operations centre in Belfast, and the firm is now operated from its Cheltenham Head Office. The Cheltenham location also manages all non-sales related areas of the business, such as Marketing, Finance, IT, and the company's subsidiary businesses dealing with financial advice and business insurance, among other interests.

A-Plan Holdings

In March 2018, Endsleigh was acquired by A-Plan Holdings.
