= Ed Stein (footballer) =

English football player and manager (born 1955)

Personal information
- Full name: Edwin Stein
- Date of birth: 28 September 1955 (age 71)
- Place of birth: Cape Town, South Africa
- Position: Right winger

Senior career*
Years	Team	Apps	(Gls)
- Edgware Town
1977–1978	Luton Town		
- Dagenham
1982–1992	Barnet		

Managerial career
- 1992–1993: Barnet
- 2000–2003: Harrow Borough
- 2012–2014: Banbury United
- * Club domestic league appearances and goals

Edwin Stein (born 28 September 1955) is an English former professional football player and coach.

== Playing career ==
Stein, who played as a midfielder, started his career at Edgware Town alongside his brother Brian, before the pair were signed to Luton Town in November 1977. Ed stayed at Luton for seven months before leaving due to a lack of playing time, returning to non-league football alongside working for the Liberal Party. He played non-league football for Dagenham, before making one appearance in the Football League for Barnet during the 1991–1992 season.

Stein made over 500 appearances for Barnet between 1982 and 1993, making his debut on 14 August 1982 in a 1–0 defeat at Bangor City in the Alliance Premier League in the following line up; Gary Lewin, Tony Bennett, Pat Kruse, Alan Garner, Mike Pittaway, Edwin Stein, Ronnie Howell, Gary Sargent, Steve Ragan, Stuart Atkins and Colin Barnes. Sub Peter Robinson.

Stein was voted Player of the Season at Underhill in 1988–89 by the BFC Supporters Association

== Coaching career ==
Stein retired from professional footballer in 1992 to become manager at Barnet; at the time he was just one of two black managers in the country, alongside Keith Alexander. Stein resigned from Barnet in July 1993 in order to become Assistant Manager at Southend United, under former colleague Barry Fry. He later became manager of non-league side Harrow Borough, leaving that position in November 2003 after three-and-a-half years.

Stein took over as manager of Southern Premier Division side Banbury United in September 2012. He resigned in August 2014.

== Personal life ==
His brothers Brian and Mark were also professional footballers. The Stein brothers were born in South Africa, and arrived in the United Kingdom in 1968 when their father Isaiah Stein, an activist with the African National Congress and former boxer, fled the country to escape police persecution and torture for his political activities. Isaiah continued his activism in Britain, serving as a member of the South African Non-Racial Olympic Committee.

== Managerial statistics ==
As of 19 November 2010

Team	From	To	Matches	Won	Drawn	Lost	Win %
Barnet	1 April 1992	30 June 1993	54	27	13	14	50.00
