= Stan Flashman =

British ticket tout and football club chairman

Stanley Flashman (3 December 1936 – 21 December 1999) was a British ticket tout and football team chairman. He claimed he could obtain tickets for almost anything, from sports events to the Queen's Garden Parties at Buckingham Palace.

He claimed he sold his first ticket for a game featuring Tottenham Hotspur in 1960. He was known as Fat Stan due to being overweight all his life and, by 1975, weighed over 19 stone. He became Britain's number one ticket tout.

== Chairmanship of Barnet ==
In 1985, he took over as chairman of struggling Barnet Football Club who were heading towards receivership. Buying the club cost him just £50,000. Almost immediately the team improved and, with Barry Fry as manager, Barnet won the Conference and promotion to the Football League in 1991. Despite Fry's success as manager, he and Flashman had their differences and Fry was regularly sacked and then reinstated by Flashman.

He resigned as chairman in 1993 after they had narrowly avoided bankruptcy and expulsion from the Football League.

In 1995, Barnet goalkeeper, coach and manager Gary Phillips said of Flashman, "A lot of people knock Stan and I had my run ins with him as much as anyone but at the end of the day he did save the place once. When he was good he was very, very, generous, and most of the time he looked after the lads well. Unfortunately when it went sour he, maybe, could have handled things a lot better".

== Death ==
Flashman died in 1999 after a long period of suffering from Alzheimer's disease.
