= Barry Fry =

English football player and manager (born 1945)

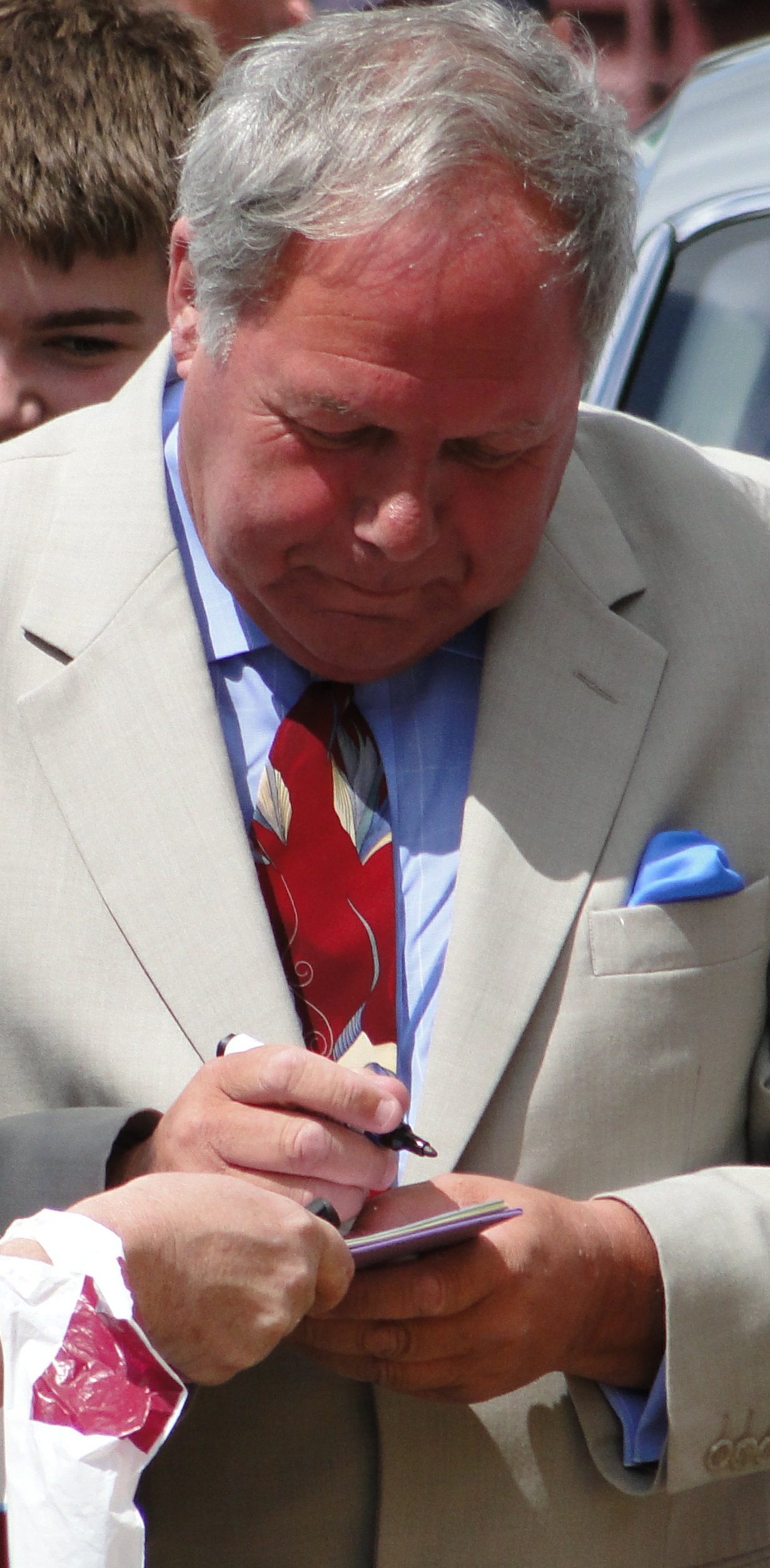
- Fry at Upton Park in 2011

Personal information
- Full name: Barry Francis Fry
- Date of birth: 7 April 1945 (age 81)
- Place of birth: Bedford, England
- Position: Inside forward

Team information
- Current team: Peterborough United (director of football)

Youth career
- 1960–1962: Manchester United

Senior career*
Years	Team	Apps	(Gls)
1962–1964	Manchester United	0	(0)
1964–1965	Bolton Wanderers	3	(1)
1965–1966	Luton Town	6	(0)
1966–1967	Leyton Orient	13	(0)
1967–1968	Gravesend & Northfleet		
1968	Leyton Orient		
1967–1969	Romford	50	(8)
1969–1972	Bedford Town		
1972	Stevenage Town	7	(1)
1972–1973	Dunstable Town		
1973–1974	St Albans City	23	(1)

Managerial career
- 1974–1976: Dunstable Town
- 1976–1977: Hillingdon Borough
- 1977–1978: Bedford Town
- 1978–1985: Barnet
- 1985–1986: Maidstone United
- 1986–1993: Barnet
- 1993: Southend United
- 1993–1996: Birmingham City
- 1996–2005: Peterborough United
- 2006: Peterborough United (joint caretaker)
- * Club domestic league appearances and goals

Barry Francis Fry (born 7 April 1945) is an English former football player and manager. An inside forward, Fry scored a goal for England Schoolboys in front of nearly 100,000 supporters at Wembley and was seen as the best player in the team. He went on to sign for Manchester United as an apprentice but never played for the first team and then had brief spells with Bolton Wanderers, Luton Town and Leyton Orient, before he retired prematurely due to injury.

Fry has managed Dunstable Town, Bedford Town, Maidstone United, Southend United, Barnet, Birmingham City and, Peterborough United. Fry is currently director of football at Peterborough United.

== Playing career ==
After progressing through the youth team at Manchester United, Fry starred briefly for Football League sides Bolton Wanders, Luton Town and Leyton Orient in the 1960s, before embarking on a non-league career that took in clubs including Gravesend & Northfleet, Romford, Bedford Town, Dunstable Town, Stevenage Town and St Albans City.

== Managerial career ==
In 1974, Dunstable Town received the financial backing of Keith Cheesman. He hired Barry Fry as manager, and gave him money to build a strong team; indeed in his autobiography, Fry claims that he was often given blank, signed cheques. Jeff Astle and George Best were brought in to play, with Best playing two pre-season games to promote interest in the club. Dunstable was promoted under Fry, but he was dismissed by Cheesman's successor, Billy Kitt, after poor performance in the Southern League.

After spells at Hillingdon Borough and hometown club Bedford Town, in 1979 Fry became Barnet manager for the first of two management spells covering thirteen seasons. In his first spell, Barnet maintained a mid-table position in the Alliance League for six seasons before Fry left in December 1985 to manage Maidstone United. He returned to Barnet in August 1986 for a further seven seasons. Three times runners-up in the GM Vauxhall Conference, Fry achieved his first managerial success as Champions in 1990–91. Two years later he guided them towards the new Division Two (leaving two months before the end of the season to manage Southend United) despite being sacked eight times and reinstated each time by controversial chairman Stan Flashman, as well as being in charge of a club in a precarious financial state and under threat of expulsion from the Football League.

Fry moved to Southend United in 1993 with the club bottom of Division One. Fry kept Southend up, but moved to Birmingham City. Though Birmingham were relegated in his first season, he won the Division Two championship and the Football League Trophy in 1994–95. During the 1995–96 season, Fry guided the Blues to the semi-finals of the League Cup but was sacked after the club finished 15th in Division One.

Just after leaving Birmingham, Fry became chairman-manager of Peterborough United. They were relegated to Division Three in his first season, but regained their Division Two status three years later. Fry's nine-year reign as manager came to an end in May 2005 after they were relegated again, after which time he took up a role as director of football. Fry remained as chairman until 2006 when Darragh MacAnthony succeeded him.

=== In popular culture ===
Fry starred in a documentary called There's Only One Barry Fry. The programme included some of Fry's dressing room antics, including a row with Mick Bodley and his promise to get the Posh out of Division Two. The documentary shows how Fry signed Miguel de Souza to Peterborough from Wycombe Wanderers, and shouted "Sold to the fat bastard in the blue blazer!" when Fry and De Souza reached an agreement.

=== Betting controversy ===
In December 2018, Fry was charged by the Football Association for alleged misconduct in relation to betting after claims he placed bets on matches or competitions during the 2017–18 season, in breach of FA rules. He accepted the charges, and on 31 January 2019 he was suspended from all footballing activity for four months, with three months of those suspended for a two-year period.

== Managerial statistics ==
Managerial record by team and tenure
Team	From	To	Record					Ref
Team	From	To	G	W	D	L	Win %	Ref
Dunstable Town	1 July 1974	1 July 1976	94	47	18	29	50.00	
Hillingdon Borough	1 July 1976	1 July 1977	51	19	12	20	37.25	
Bedford Town	1 July 1977	1 July 1978	51	11	17	23	21.57	
Barnet	8 December 1978 (Note: Billy Meadows resigned on 7 December 1978, but no successor is mentioned in that day's report. Fry was in charge by the game against Weymouth on 9 December.)	3 January 1985	415	152	102	161	36.63	
Maidstone United	1 August 1985	1 August 1986	44	11	16	17	25.00	
Barnet	1 August 1986	31 March 1993	375	209	72	94	55.73	
Southend United	1 April 1993	10 December 1993	35	17	7	11	48.57	
Birmingham City	10 December 1993	7 May 1996	156	68	44	44	43.59	
Peterborough United	1 August 1996	31 May 2005	488	167	133	188	34.22	
Peterborough United (caretaker)	22 April 2006	30 May 2006	3	1	0	2	33.33	
Total			1,712	702	421	589	41.00	

== Honours ==
Barnet

- Football Conference: 1990–91
- Conference League Cup: 1988–89

Birmingham City

- Football League Second Division: 1994–95
- Football League Trophy: 1994–95

Peterborough United

- Football League Third Division play-offs: 2000

Individual

- Football Conference Manager of the Month: September 1986, January 1987

== See also ==
- List of football managers with the most matches
