= 1994–95 West Bromwich Albion F.C. season =

West Bromwich Albion
1994–95 season
- Chairman: Tony Hale
- Manager: Keith Burkinshaw (until 17 October); Alan Buckley (from 20 October)
- Stadium: The Hawthorns
- First Division: 19th
- FA Cup: Third round
- League Cup: First round
- Top goalscorer: Hunt (13)
- Average home league attendance: 15,217

During the 1994–95 English football season, West Bromwich Albion F.C. competed in the Football League First Division.

== Season summary ==
In the 1994–95 season, West Brom started the campaign very poorly with the Baggies winning just one in their first 11 league matches, leaving them bottom of the league and resulting in Burkinshaw being sacked as manager. Grimsby manager Alan Buckley took over the managerial vacancy and managed to keep them away from relegation.

== Final league table ==
| Pos | Team | Pld | W | D | L | GF | GA | GD | Pts | Qualification or relegation |
|---|---|---|---|---|---|---|---|---|---|---|
| 17 | Port Vale | 46 | 15 | 13 | 18 | 58 | 64 | −6 | 58 | |
| 18 | Portsmouth | 46 | 15 | 13 | 18 | 53 | 63 | −10 | 58 | |
| 19 | West Bromwich Albion | 46 | 16 | 10 | 20 | 51 | 57 | −6 | 58 | |
| 20 | Sunderland | 46 | 12 | 18 | 16 | 41 | 45 | −4 | 54 | |
| 21 | Swindon Town (R) | 46 | 12 | 12 | 22 | 54 | 73 | −19 | 48 | Relegation to the Second Division |

Rules for classification: 1) Points; 2) Goals scored; 3) Goal difference
(R) Relegated

== Results ==
West Bromwich Albion's score comes first

=== Legend ===
| Win | Draw | Loss |

=== Football League First Division ===
| Date | Opponent | Venue | Result | Attendance | Scorers |
|---|---|---|---|---|---|
| 13 August 1994 | Luton Town | A | 1–1 | 8,640 | Taylor |
| 28 August 1994 | Wolverhampton Wanderers | A | 0–2 | 27,764 | |
| 31 August 1994 | Swindon Town | A | 0–0 | 10,964 | |
| 10 September 1994 | Millwall | A | 2–2 | 8,407 | Taylor (2) |
| 14 September 1994 | Middlesbrough | A | 1–2 | 14,878 | Ashcroft |
| 17 September 1994 | Grimsby Town | H | 1–1 | 14,496 | Ashcroft |
| 24 September 1994 | Burnley | H | 1–0 | 13,539 | Taylor |
| 28 September 1994 | Portsmouth | H | 0–2 | 13,545 | |
| 2 October 1994 | Stoke City | A | 1–4 | 14,183 | Taylor |
| 8 October 1994 | Sunderland | H | 1–3 | 13,717 | Ashcroft |
| 15 October 1994 | Tranmere Rovers | A | 1–3 | 7,397 | Hunt |
| 18 October 1994 | Sheffield United | H | 1–0 | 12,713 | Mellon |
| 22 October 1994 | Barnsley | A | 0–2 | 5,082 | |
| 29 October 1994 | Reading | H | 2–0 | 14,313 | Hunt, Ashcroft |
| 2 November 1994 | Port Vale | H | 0–0 | 14,513 | |
| 5 November 1994 | Watford | A | 0–1 | 8,419 | |
| 13 November 1994 | Charlton Athletic | A | 1–1 | 10,921 | Taylor |
| 19 November 1994 | Oldham Athletic | H | 3–1 | 14,616 | Donovan, Ashcroft, Taylor |
| 26 November 1994 | Notts County | A | 0–2 | 10,088 | |
| 3 December 1994 | Barnsley | H | 2–1 | 13,921 | Heggs, Hamilton |
| 10 December 1994 | Sheffield United | A | 0–2 | 13,891 | |
| 18 December 1994 | Luton Town | H | 1–0 | 14,392 | Donovan |
| 26 December 1994 | Bristol City | H | 1–0 | 21,071 | Munro (own goal) |
| 27 December 1994 | Southend United | A | 1–2 | 6,847 | Ashcroft |
| 31 December 1994 | Bolton Wanderers | H | 1–0 | 18,134 | Hunt |
| 2 January 1995 | Derby County | A | 1–1 | 16,035 | Hamilton |
| 14 January 1995 | Reading | A | 2–0 | 9,390 | Hunt, Donovan |
| 1 February 1995 | Watford | H | 0–1 | 15,455 | |
| 5 February 1995 | Charlton Athletic | H | 0–1 | 12,084 | |
| 11 February 1995 | Port Vale | A | 0–1 | 10,751 | |
| 18 February 1995 | Notts County | H | 3–2 | 13,748 | Hunt (2), Mardon |
| 21 February 1995 | Oldham Athletic | A | 0–1 | 7,750 | |
| 25 February 1995 | Stoke City | H | 1–3 | 16,591 | Hamilton |
| 4 March 1995 | Burnley | A | 1–1 | 11,885 | Hunt |
| 8 March 1995 | Portsmouth | A | 2–1 | 7,160 | Taylor (2) |
| 15 March 1995 | Wolverhampton Wanderers | H | 2–0 | 20,661 | Taylor, Ashcroft |
| 19 March 1995 | Swindon Town | H | 2–5 | 12,960 | Rees, Hunt |
| 22 March 1995 | Millwall | H | 3–0 | 11,782 | Hunt (3, 1 pen) |
| 25 March 1995 | Grimsby Town | A | 2–0 | 7,393 | Donovan, Hunt |
| 1 April 1995 | Middlesbrough | H | 1–3 | 20,256 | Rees |
| 8 April 1995 | Bolton Wanderers | A | 0–1 | 16,207 | |
| 15 April 1995 | Southend United | H | 2–0 | 14,635 | Hamilton, Strodder |
| 17 April 1995 | Bristol City | A | 0–1 | 8,777 | |
| 22 April 1995 | Derby County | H | 0–0 | 15,365 | |
| 30 April 1995 | Tranmere Rovers | H | 5–1 | 17,484 | Taylor, Ashcroft (3, 1 pen), Donovan |
| 7 May 1995 | Sunderland | A | 2–2 | 18,232 | Agnew, Hunt |

=== FA Cup ===
| Round | Date | Opponent | Venue | Result | Attendance | Goalscorers |
|---|---|---|---|---|---|---|
| R3 | 7 January 1995 | Coventry City | A | 1–1 | 16,555 | Ashcroft (pen) |
| R3R | 18 January 1995 | Coventry City | H | 1–2 | 23,230 | Raven |

=== League Cup ===
| Round | Date | Opponent | Venue | Result | Attendance | Goalscorers |
|---|---|---|---|---|---|---|
| R1 1st Leg | 16 August 1994 | Hereford United | A | 0–0 | 5,425 | |
| R1 2nd Leg | 7 September 1994 | Hereford United | H | 0–1 (lost 0–1 on agg) | 10,604 | |

== First-team squad ==
Squad at end of season

Note: Flags indicate national team as defined under FIFA eligibility rules; some limited exceptions apply. Players may hold more than one non-FIFA nationality.

| No. | Pos. | Nation | Player |
|---|---|---|---|
| — | GK | (England) ENG | Gary Germaine (Note: Germaine was born in Birmingham, England, but also qualified to represent Scotland internationally and would represent them at U-21 level.) |
| — | GK | (England) ENG | Tony Lange |
| — | GK | (England) ENG | Stuart Naylor |
| — | DF | (Northern Ireland) NIR | Paul Agnew |
| — | DF | (England) ENG | Daryl Burgess |
| — | DF | (England) ENG | Scott Darton |
| — | DF | (England) ENG | Paul Edwards |
| — | DF | (England) ENG | Craig Herbert |
| — | DF | (England) ENG | Paul Mardon (Note: Mardon was born in Bristol, England, but also qualified to represent Wales internationally and would make his international debut for Wales in October 1995.) |
| — | DF | (England) ENG | Neil Parsley |
| — | DF | (England) ENG | Paul Raven |
| — | DF | (England) ENG | Gary Strodder |
| — | MF | (England) ENG | Darren Bradley |
| — | MF | (England) ENG | Stacy Coldicott |
| — | MF | (England) ENG | Kevin Donovan |

| No. | Pos. | Nation | Player |
|---|---|---|---|
| — | MF | (England) ENG | Ian Hamilton |
| — | MF | (England) ENG | Roy Hunter |
| — | MF | (Northern Ireland) NIR | Bernard McNally (Note: McNally was born in Shrewsbury, England, but also qualified to represent Northern Ireland internationally and made his international debut for Northern Ireland in 1986.) |
| — | MF | (Scotland) SCO | Micky Mellon |
| — | MF | (Republic of Ireland) IRL | Kieran O'Regan |
| — | MF | (England) ENG | Mike Phelan |
| — | MF | (England) ENG | David Smith |
| — | FW | (England) ENG | Lee Ashcroft |
| — | FW | (Netherlands) NED | Jeroen Boere (on loan from West Ham United) |
| — | FW | (England) ENG | Graham Fenton (on loan from Aston Villa) |
| — | FW | (England) ENG | Carl Heggs |
| — | FW | (England) ENG | Andy Hunt |
| — | FW | (Wales) WAL | Tony Rees |
| — | FW | (England) ENG | Bob Taylor |
