= 1993–94 West Bromwich Albion F.C. season =

West Bromwich Albion
1993–94 season
- Chairman: Trevor Summers
- Manager: Keith Burkinshaw
- Stadium: The Hawthorns
- First Division: 21st
- FA Cup: First round
- League Cup: Second round
- Top goalscorer: Taylor (18)
- Average home league attendance: 16,840

During the 1993–94 English football season, West Bromwich Albion F.C. competed in the Football League First Division.

== Season summary ==
Following Ardiles' surprise departure, West Brom appointed his assistant Keith Burkinshaw to the manager's seat. The Baggies survived relegation back to Division Two at the end of the 1993–94 season, but only because they had scored more goals than rivals, Birmingham City. Safety was assured on the final day thanks to a 1–0 win over Portsmouth - Lee Ashcroft's goal sending the 10,000 strong army of fans in raptures.

== Final league table ==
Pos	Team	Pld	W	D	L	GF	GA	GD	Pts	Qualification or relegation
19	Watford	46	15	9	22	66	80	−14	54	
20	Luton Town	46	14	11	21	56	60	−4	53	
21	West Bromwich Albion	46	13	12	21	60	69	−9	51	
22	Birmingham City (R)	46	13	12	21	52	69	−17	51	Relegation to the Second Division
23	Oxford United (R)	46	13	10	23	54	75	−21	49	Relegation to the Second Division

Source: rsssf.com
Rules for classification: 1) Points; 2) Goals scored; 3) Goal difference
(R) Relegated

== Results ==
West Bromwich Albion's score comes first

=== Legend ===
Win	Draw	Loss

=== Football League First Division ===
Date	Opponent	Venue	Result	Attendance	Scorers
14 August 1993	Barnsley	A	1–1	12,940	Donovan
21 August 1993	Oxford United	H	3–1	17,227	Hunt, Donovan, O'Regan
28 August 1993	Stoke City	A	0–1	17,948	
1 September 1993	Southend United	H	2–2	14,482	Taylor (2)
5 September 1993	Wolverhampton Wanderers	H	3–2	25,615	Raven, Bradley, Donovan
11 September 1993	Notts County	A	0–1	9,870	
18 September 1993	Crystal Palace	H	1–4	17,873	Taylor
25 September 1993	Middlesbrough	H	1–1	15,766	Taylor
3 October 1993	Derby County	A	3–5	13,370	Taylor, Hunt (2)
9 October 1993	Millwall	A	1–2	11,010	Bradley
16 October 1993	Peterborough United	H	3–0	15,134	Taylor (2), Strodder
23 October 1993	Sunderland	A	0–1	19,505	
30 October 1993	Watford	H	4–1	15,299	Hunt (2), Hamilton, Taylor
2 November 1993	Tranmere Rovers	A	0–3	7,882	
6 November 1993	Bolton Wanderers	H	2–2	15,709	Hunt, Taylor (pen)
21 November 1993	Nottingham Forest	H	0–2	15,581	
27 November 1993	Portsmouth	H	4–1	13,867	Taylor, O'Regan, Hunt (2)
7 December 1993	Bolton Wanderers	A	1–1	9,277	Hunt
11 December 1993	Southend United	A	3–0	6,807	Hamilton, Taylor, Hunt
19 December 1993	Barnsley	H	1–1	16,062	Ashcroft
27 December 1993	Bristol City	H	0–1	22,888	
28 December 1993	Birmingham City	A	0–2	28,228	
1 January 1994	Luton Town	H	1–1	16,138	Mellon
3 January 1994	Charlton Athletic	A	1–2	8,316	Hamilton
12 January 1994	Leicester City	A	2–4	15,640	Strodder, Mellon
15 January 1994	Peterborough United	A	0–2	7,757	
22 January 1994	Millwall	H	0–0	15,172	
1 February 1994	Grimsby Town	A	2–2	4,740	Taylor, Fenton
5 February 1994	Sunderland	H	2–1	17,089	Donovan, Fenton
12 February 1994	Watford	A	1–0	10,087	Burgess
19 February 1994	Leicester City	H	1–2	18,153	Fenton
26 February 1994	Wolverhampton Wanderers	A	2–1	28,039	Taylor, Mardon
5 March 1994	Stoke City	H	0–0	16,060	
12 March 1994	Crystal Palace	A	0–1	16,576	
16 March 1994	Notts County	H	3–0	14,594	Taylor (2), Hunt
19 March 1994	Middlesbrough	A	0–3	10,516	
26 March 1994	Derby County	H	1–2	17,437	Donovan
30 March 1994	Charlton Athletic	H	2–0	14,091	Donovan, Hunt
2 April 1994	Bristol City	A	0–0	8,624	
12 April 1994	Oxford United	A	1–1	9,028	Taylor
16 April 1994	Tranmere Rovers	H	1–3	15,835	Nixon (own goal)
24 April 1994	Nottingham Forest	A	1–2	24,018	Taylor
27 April 1994	Birmingham City	H	2–4	20,316	Donovan, Burgess
30 April 1994	Grimsby Town	H	1–0	16,870	Donovan
3 May 1994	Luton Town	A	2–3	10,053	Taylor, Ashcroft
8 May 1994	Portsmouth	A	1–0	17,629 (9,500 away)	Ashcroft

=== FA Cup ===
Round	Date	Opponent	Venue	Result	Attendance	Goalscorers
R1	14 November 1993	Halifax Town	A	1–2	4,250	Hunt

=== League Cup ===
Round	Date	Opponent	Venue	Result	Attendance	Goalscorers
R1 First Leg	18 August 1993	Bristol Rovers	A	4–1	4,562	Burgess, Hunt, Donovan (2)
R1 Second Leg	25 August 1993	Bristol Rovers	H	0–0 (won 4–1 on agg)	9,123	
R2 First Leg	22 September 1993	Chelsea	H	1–1	14,919	Donovan
R2 Second Leg	6 October 1993	Chelsea	A	1–2 (lost 2–3 on agg)	11,959	Taylor

=== Anglo-Italian Cup ===
Round	Date	Opponent	Venue	Result	Attendance	Goalscorers
PR Group 4	8 September 1993	Leicester City	A	0–0	3,588	
PR Group 4	15 September 1993	Peterborough United	H	3–1	4,168	McNally, Mellon, Darton
Group B	12 October 1993	Pescara	H	1–2	5,458	Taylor
Group B	9 November 1993	Padova	H	3–4	2,745	Hamilton, Ottoni (own goal), Garner
Group B	16 November 1993	Fiorentina	A	0–2	7,808	Banchelli, Antonaccio
Group B	22 December 1993	Cosenza	A	1–2	139	Taylor

== First-team squad ==
Squad at end of season

Note: Flags indicate national team as defined under FIFA eligibility rules; some limited exceptions apply. Players may hold more than one non-FIFA nationality.

No.	Pos.	Nation	Player
—	GK	ENG	Stuart Naylor
—	DF	ENG	Paul Raven
—	DF	ENG	Daryl Burgess
—	DF	ENG	Gary Strodder
—	DF	ENG	Paul Mardon (Note: Mardon was born in Bristol, England, but also qualified to represent Wales internationally and would make his international debut for Wales in October 1995.)
—	MF	ENG	Darren Bradley
—	MF	ENG	Ian Hamilton
—	MF	NIR	Bernard McNally (Note: McNally was born in Shrewsbury, England, but also qualified to represent Northern Ireland internationally and made his international debut for Northern Ireland in 1986.)
—	MF	ENG	Kevin Donovan
—	FW	ENG	Bob Taylor
—	FW	ENG	Andy Hunt
—	FW	ENG	Lee Ashcroft
—	MF	IRL	Kieran O'Regan
—	MF	SCO	Micky Mellon
—	GK	ENG	Tony Lange
—	MF	ENG	Stacy Coldicott

No.	Pos.	Nation	Player
—	MF	ENG	David Smith
—	FW	ENG	Simon Garner
—	MF	IRL	Kwame Ampadu (Note: Ampadu was born in Bradford, England, but also qualified to represent the Republic of Ireland and Ghana internationally through his mother and father respectively, and was raised in the Republic of Ireland, and represented them at U-21 level.)
—	FW	ENG	Carl Heggs
—	DF	ENG	Neil Parsley
—	DF	ENG	Nicky Reid
—	DF	ENG	Paul Williams (on loan from Coventry City)
—	MF	ENG	Graham Fenton (on loan from Aston Villa)
—	MF	ENG	Wayne Fereday
—	DF	ENG	Scott Darton
—	DF	ENG	Paul Edwards
—	MF	ENG	Roy Hunter
—	DF	ENG	Craig Herbert
—	GK	ENG	Neil Cutler
—	DF	ENG	Steve Lilwall
