= 1993 Football League Second Division play-off final =

Association football match

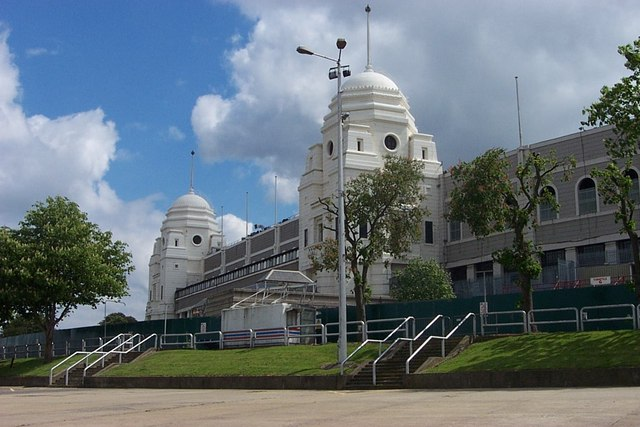
- The Twin Towers of Wembley Stadium
- Event: 1992–93 Football League Second Division
Port Vale	West Bromwich Albion
0	3
- Date: 30 May 1993
- Venue: Wembley Stadium, London
- Referee: Roger Milford (Gloucestershire)
- Attendance: 53,471

The 1993 Football League Second Division play-off final was a football match played on 30 May 1993 at Wembley Stadium, London, between Port Vale and West Bromwich Albion to determine the third and final team to gain promotion from the Second Division to the First Division. The top two teams of the 1992–93 Football League Second Division season gained automatic promotion to the First Division, while those placed from third to sixth place in the table took part in play-offs; the winners of the play-off semi-finals competed for the final place for the 1993–94 season in the First Division.

West Bromwich Albion had no experience of the play-offs before 1993, while Port Vale had won promotion through the third tier play-offs after winning the 1989 play-off final. In the semi-finals, Port Vale defeated Stockport County, and West Bromwich Albion beat Swansea City. A Wembley Stadium crowd of more than 53,000 people watched the final, which was refereed by Roger Milford. The match finished with a comprehensive 3–0 victory for West Bromwich Albion, all three goals coming in the second half. Port Vale defender Peter Swan was sent off on the hour mark for bringing down Bob Taylor, who had been through on goal. Andy Hunt, Nicky Reid and Kevin Donovan went on to score for West Bromwich Albion to take their team into the second tier of the Football League.

West Bromwich Albion ended the following season in 21st place in the First Division, above the relegation zone on goal difference. Port Vale's next season saw them secure promotion in second place in the Second Division, three points above the play-offs and one point behind the league champions.

== Route to the final ==
Football League Second Division final table, leading positions
Pos	Team	Pld	W	D	L	GF	GA	GD	Pts
1	Stoke City	46	27	12	7	73	34	+39	93
2	Bolton Wanderers	46	27	9	10	80	41	+39	90
3	Port Vale	46	26	11	9	79	44	+35	89
4	West Bromwich Albion	46	25	10	11	88	54	+34	85
5	Swansea City	46	20	13	13	65	47	+18	73
6	Stockport County	46	19	15	12	81	57	+24	72
7	Leyton Orient	46	21	9	16	69	53	+16	72
8	Reading	46	18	15	13	66	51	+15	69

Port Vale had finished the regular 1992–93 season in third place in the Second Division, the third tier of the English football league system, one place ahead of West Bromwich Albion. Both, therefore, missed out on the two automatic promotion places to the First Division and instead took part in the play-offs to determine the third promoted team. Port Vale had finished one point behind Bolton Wanderers (who were promoted in second place) and four points behind league winners (and Potteries derby rivals) Stoke City; they had drawn both their games with Bolton and lost both their games with Stoke. West Bromwich Albion finished four points behind Port Vale.

Port Vale's opponents for the play-off semi-final were Stockport County, and the first match of the two-legged tie was played at Edgeley Park in Stockport. Jim Gannon converted a fifth-minute penalty, only for Dean Glover to level the scores at 1–1 on 24 minutes, with the game ending in a draw. The return leg was held at Vale Park three days later and Martin Foyle's 84th-minute strike went unanswered to give Port Vale a 2–1 aggregate victory. On 22 May, Port Vale would also beat Stockport 2–1 in the 1993 Football League Trophy final at Wembley Stadium. Paul Kerr put Port Vale ahead, before Bernie Slaven made it two before half-time. Striker Kevin Francis pulled one back for Stockport, but Port Vale held on for another 2–1 victory.

West Bromwich Albion faced Swansea City in their semi-final play-off, and the first match of the two-legged tie was played at Vetch Field, Swansea. West Bromwich Albion lost the match 2–1 after Andy McFarlane and Martin Hayes scored twice in the 20 minutes after the second half kick-off, only for McFarlane to give the visitors a lifeline with an own goal on 72 minutes. The second leg was played three days later at The Hawthorns, West Brom's home ground. Andy Hunt and Ian Hamilton put the home side in control of the tie with goals on 10 and 20 minutes. No further goals ensured West Bromwich Albion of a 3–2 aggregate victory.

Port Vale			Round	West Bromwich Albion
Opponent	Result	Legs	Semi-finals	Opponent	Result	Legs
Stockport County	2–1	1–1 away; 1–0 home		Swansea City	3–2	1–2 away; 2–0 home

== Match ==
=== Background ===
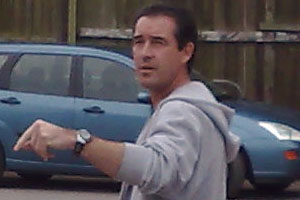
Bob Taylor in September 2007

This was West Bromwich Albion's first attempt to be promoted via the play-offs. Port Vale won promotion through the third-tier play-offs after winning the 1989 play-off final. West Bromwich Albion had scored 88 goals in the 1992–93 season, more than any other team in the Second Division; 30 of these goals came from the division's top scorer Bob Taylor. West Bromwich Albion had dropped into the third tier of the English Football League for the first time in their history in 1991 and recorded their lowest ever finish of seventh in the third tier in the 1991–92 season. Port Vale had been relegated out of the second tier in 1992 and were looking for an immediate return. In the two league matches played between the clubs during the regular season, Port Vale won 1–0 away in October 1992 and 2–1 at home the following February. The referee for the match was Roger Milford, representing the Gloucestershire County Football Association, who was described as "the players' friend" as he was yet to send a player off in the 1992–93 season. Port Vale team coach driver David Durber sat on the squad bench for the match as manager John Rudge had run out of his allocated tickets. Port Vale took 11,000 supporters to Wembley, who were heavily outnumbered by the 42,300 West Bromwich Albion supporters.

=== Summary ===
The first half finished goalless, with Port Vale showing patience and possession according to The Independent reporter Phil Shaw. West Bromwich Albion were starting to apply pressure early in the second half and Kevin Donovan came close to opening the scoring with a bicycle kick. Port Vale also had a 53rd-minute cross-cum-shot by Ian Taylor tipped over the bar by Tony Lange. Paul Musselwhite denied Donovan and Paul Raven after Bob Taylor exploited Port Vale defender Peter Swan's lack of pace. Swan fouled Taylor on 60 minutes and his subsequent dismissal proved to be the turning point in the match; it also meant that he became the third Englishman to be sent off at Wembley, after Kevin Keegan and Lee Dixon. Andy Hunt scored the game's opening goal on 66 minutes, and would make his loan spell from Newcastle United into a permanent transfer for a fee of £100,000 later in the week. Hunt had capitalised with a header from a goalmouth scramble when Gary Strodder's header was blocked by a combination of Musselwhite and the crossbar, and Taylor's cross was knocked on to Hunt by Nicky Reid. Reid scored his first goal for West Bromwich Albion with an 18-yard (16 m) strike on 82 minutes after being assisted by Donovan, who countered a Port Vale attack by running past the halfway line. Reid repaid Donovan by setting him up for West Bromwich Albion's final goal from 6 yards (5.5 m) on 90 minutes, with the game ending 3–0 to West Bromwich Albion.

=== Details ===
30 May 1993
15:00 BST

West Bromwich Albion	3–0	Port Vale
Hunt 66'; Reid 82'; Donovan 90'	Report

Wembley Stadium, London
Attendance: 53,471
Referee: Roger Milford (Gloucestershire)

West Bromwich Albion	Port Vale

GK	1	Tony Lange
RB	2	Nicky Reid
LB	3	Steve Lilwall
CM	4	Darren Bradley
CB	5	Paul Raven
CB	6	Gary Strodder
CF	7	Andy Hunt	(substituted off) 89'
CM	8	Ian Hamilton
CF	9	Bob Taylor
LM	10	Bernard McNally
RM	11	Kevin Donovan
Substitutes:
CF		Simon Garner	(substituted in) 89'
CM		Gary Robson
Manager:
Osvaldo Ardiles

GK	1	Paul Musselwhite
RB	2	Neil Aspin
LB	3	Kevin Kent	(substituted off) 63'
CM	4	Andy Porter
CB	5	Peter Swan	(red card) 60'
CB	6	Dean Glover
CF	7	Bernie Slaven
CM	8	Robin van der Laan	(substituted off) 82'
CF	9	Martin Foyle
CM	10	Paul Kerr
RM	11	Ian Taylor
Substitutes:
CF	12	Nicky Cross	(substituted in) 82'
CB	14	Peter Billing	(substituted in) 63'
Manager:
John Rudge

== Post-match ==
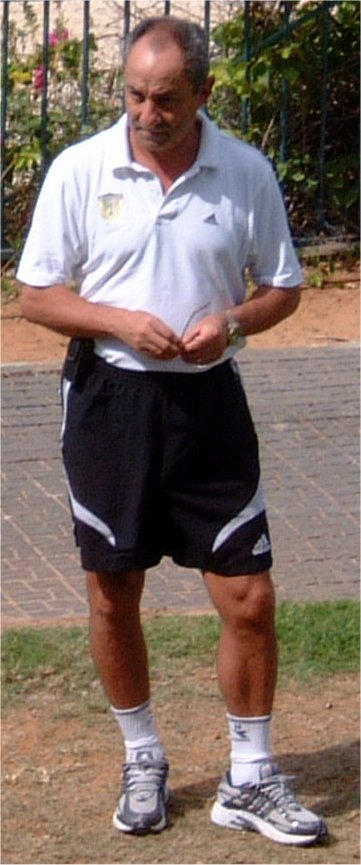
Osvaldo Ardiles in 2006

West Bromwich Albion manager Osvaldo Ardiles had secured his fourth success at Wembley as a player and manager and said: "This is the best place in the world to win, but when you lose, it looks empty and dirty. Here, the winner takes all." The victory was estimated to win his club £2 million from season-ticket sales and TV rights. Port Vale manager John Rudge said: "You can't ask much more of a team than to get 89 points, which would have won us the Championship last year. It's a cruel game." Speaking in 2018, Bob Taylor described the feeling of "massive relief" and how "the parties ensued afterwards ... my memory's a bit fuzzy, but we stopped off halfway through at some hotel, had a few drinks there, and then carried on back. It went on into the daylight hours."

West Bromwich Albion spent nine more seasons outside the top division but avoided a return to the third tier. Instead, after narrowly avoiding relegation the next season, they steadily improved until achieving promotion to the Premier League by finishing second in the 2001–02 season. Port Vale won promotion as runners-up in the following season, and spent the next six seasons in the second tier. But after a high of eighth in 1996–97 they returned to the third tier for the new millennium after relegation at the end of the 1999–2000 season.

Ardiles left West Bromwich Albion to return to manage Tottenham Hotspur in 1993, before heading abroad in 1995; he ended up coaching in places as varied as Croatia, Japan, Saudi Arabia and Argentina. Rudge was controversially sacked in 1999 and decided 16 years as a manager was enough, instead choosing to become Director of Football at local rivals Stoke City. Bob Taylor had continued success at West Bromwich Albion before spending 1998 to 2000 with Bolton Wanderers, only to return to The Hawthorns to help the club to reach the Premier League in 2002. Andy Hunt stayed with West Bromwich Albion until 1998 when he signed for Charlton Athletic, retiring in April 2000 at age 30 due to illness; he later emigrated to Belize. Nicky Reid left the club in 1997 to become player-manager of Sligo Rovers, but things did not go well for him and he returned to England to become a physiotherapist at various clubs. Kevin Donovan also left in 1997 and moved to Grimsby Town, also scoring for them in the 1998 Second Division play-off final; he continued to maintain links to Grimsby Town after retiring.
