= 1996–97 West Bromwich Albion F.C. season =

West Bromwich Albion
1996–97 season
- Chairman: Tony Hale
- Manager: Alan Buckley (until January); Ray Harford (from February)
- Stadium: The Hawthorns
- First Division: 16th
- FA Cup: Third round
- League Cup: First round
- Top goalscorer: League: Andy Hunt and Paul Peschisolido (15); All: Andy Hunt (16)
- Highest home attendance: 20,711 (vs. Wolverhampton Wanderers, 15 September)
- Lowest home attendance: 11,792 (vs. Southend United, 5 March)
- Average home league attendance: 15,064

During the 1996–97 English football season, West Bromwich Albion F.C. competed in the Football League First Division.

== Season summary ==
In February 1997, Ray Harford was named as West Bromwich's new manager in place of Alan Buckley, who was sacked with the Baggies hovering just above the relegation zone in Division One (which had been a familiar pattern since their promotion in 1993) and Harford did much to keep the club clear of relegation.

== Final league table ==
Pos	Team	Pld	W	D	L	GF	GA	GD	Pts
14	Manchester City	46	17	10	19	59	60	−1	61
15	Charlton Athletic	46	16	11	19	52	66	−14	59
16	West Bromwich Albion	46	14	15	17	68	72	−4	57
17	Oxford United	46	16	9	21	64	68	−4	57
18	Reading	46	15	12	19	58	67	−9	57

Rules for classification: 1) Points; 2) Goals scored; 3) Goal difference

== Results ==
West Bromwich Albion's score comes first

=== Legend ===
Win	Draw	Loss

=== Football League First Division ===
Date	Opponent	Venue	Result	Attendance	Scorers
17 August 1996	Barnsley	H	1–2	18,561	Hunt (pen)
24 August 1996	Charlton Athletic	A	1–1	9,642	Taylor
27 August 1996	Crystal Palace	A	0–0	13,849	
7 September 1996	Queens Park Rangers	A	2–0	12,886	Peschisolido, Taylor
10 September 1996	Reading	H	3–2	13,096	Hunt (3)
15 September 1996	Wolverhampton Wanderers	H	2–4	20,711	Hamilton, Taylor
21 September 1996	Tranmere Rovers	A	3–2	7,848	Gilbert, Peschisolido, Groves
28 September 1996	Ipswich Town	H	0–0	15,606	
1 October 1996	Oldham Athletic	A	1–1	5,817	Groves
12 October 1996	Huddersfield Town	H	1–1	14,960	Hunt
16 October 1996	Stoke City	H	0–2	16,501	
19 October 1996	Grimsby Town	A	1–1	7,187	Sneekes
26 October 1996	Bradford City	H	0–0	14,249	
30 October 1996	Swindon Town	A	3–2	8,909	Holmes, Peschisolido, Sneekes
2 November 1996	Portsmouth	A	0–4	7,354	
9 November 1996	Port Vale	H	1–1	13,975	Taylor
13 November 1996	Sheffield United	H	1–2	12,167	Coldicott
16 November 1996	Southend United	A	3–2	5,120	Peschisolido, Smith, Hunt
27 November 1996	Manchester City	A	2–3	24,200	Peschisolido, Hamilton
30 November 1996	Bradford City	A	1–1	12,003	Groves
8 December 1996	Bolton Wanderers	H	2–2	13,082	Peschisolido, Taylor
18 December 1996	Norwich City	H	5–1	12,620	Hamilton (2), Hunt (2), Peschisolido
21 December 1996	Oxford United	H	3–3	13,782	Sneekes, Hunt (pen), Taylor
26 December 1996	Reading	A	2–2	10,583	Peschisolido, Groves
28 December 1996	Queens Park Rangers	H	4–1	19,061	Sneekes, Smith, Hunt, Peschisolido
1 January 1997	Tranmere Rovers	H	1–2	14,770	Burgess
12 January 1997	Wolverhampton Wanderers	A	0–2	27,336	
18 January 1997	Oldham Athletic	H	1–1	12,103	Taylor
25 January 1997	Ipswich Town	A	0–5	9,381	
1 February 1997	Port Vale	A	2–2	8,093	Peschisolido (2)
4 February 1997	Birmingham City	A	3–2	21,600	Taylor (2), Sneekes
8 February 1997	Swindon Town	H	1–2	16,219	Hunt (pen)
15 February 1997	Norwich City	A	4–2	14,845	Peschisolido (3), Sneekes
22 February 1997	Portsmouth	H	0–2	15,800	
2 March 1997	Bolton Wanderers	A	0–1	13,258	
5 March 1997	Southend United	H	4–0	11,792	Sneekes, Murphy, Hunt, Raven
8 March 1997	Oxford United	A	0–1	8,502	
16 March 1997	Birmingham City	H	2–0	16,125	Sneekes, Hamilton
22 March 1997	Charlton Athletic	H	1–2	14,312	Hunt
28 March 1997	Barnsley	A	0–2	12,087	
5 April 1997	Sheffield United	A	2–1	15,004	Coldicott, Taylor
9 April 1997	Crystal Palace	H	1–0	12,866	Peschisolido
12 April 1997	Manchester City	H	1–3	20,087	Murphy
19 April 1997	Huddersfield Town	A	0–0	12,748	
26 April 1997	Grimsby Town	H	2–0	15,574	Hunt, Coldicott
4 May 1997	Stoke City	A	1–2	22,500	Hunt (pen)

=== FA Cup ===
Round	Date	Opponent	Venue	Result	Attendance	Goalscorers
R3	4 January 1997	Chelsea	A	0–3	27,446	

=== League Cup ===
Round	Date	Opponent	Venue	Result	Attendance	Goalscorers
R1 First Leg	20 August 1996	Colchester United	A	3–2	3,521	Hunt, Hamilton, Donovan
R1 Second Leg	3 September 1996	Colchester United	H	1–3 (lost 4–5 on agg)	9,809	Groves

== First-team squad ==
Squad at end of season

Note: Flags indicate national team as defined under FIFA eligibility rules; some limited exceptions apply. Players may hold more than one non-FIFA nationality.

No.	Pos.	Nation	Player
—	GK	(England) ENG	Paul Crichton
—	GK	(England) ENG	Alan Miller
—	GK	(England) ENG	Nigel Spink
—	GK	(Scotland) SCO	Gary Germaine (Note: Germaine was born in Birmingham, England, but also qualified to represent Scotland internationally and represented them at U-21 level.)
—	DF	(England) ENG	Paul Agnew
—	DF	(England) ENG	Daryl Burgess
—	DF	(England) ENG	Craig Herbert
—	DF	(England) ENG	Paul Holmes
—	DF	(England) ENG	Roger Joseph
—	DF	(England) ENG	Shane Nicholson
—	DF	(England) ENG	Graham Potter
—	DF	(England) ENG	Paul Raven
—	DF	(Wales) WAL	Paul Mardon (Note: Mardon was born in Bristol, England, but also qualified to represent Wales internationally and made his international debut for Wales in October 1995.)
—	DF	(Australia) AUS	Andy McDermott
—	DF	(Australia) AUS	Shaun Murphy
—	MF	(England) ENG	Dean Bennett

No.	Pos.	Nation	Player
—	MF	(England) ENG	Peter Butler
—	MF	(England) ENG	Stacy Coldicott
—	MF	(England) ENG	Shaun Cunnington
—	MF	(England) ENG	Julian Darby
—	MF	(England) ENG	Kevin Donovan
—	MF	(England) ENG	Dave Gilbert
—	MF	(England) ENG	Paul Groves
—	MF	(England) ENG	Ian Hamilton
—	MF	(England) ENG	David Smith
—	MF	(Netherlands) NED	Richard Sneekes
—	FW	(England) ENG	Lee Ashcroft
—	FW	(England) ENG	Andy Hunt
—	FW	(England) ENG	Michael Rodosthenous
—	FW	(England) ENG	Bob Taylor
—	FW	(Canada) CAN	Paul Peschisolido

=== Reserve squad ===
Note: Flags indicate national team as defined under FIFA eligibility rules; some limited exceptions apply. Players may hold more than one non-FIFA nationality.

No. / Pos. / Nation / Player; — / GK / (England) ENG / Chris Adamson	No. / Pos. / Nation / Player; — / DF / (England) ENG / Gareth Hanmer
