= 1995–96 West Bromwich Albion F.C. season =

West Bromwich Albion
1995–96 season
- Chairman: Tony Hale
- Manager: Alan Buckley
- Stadium: The Hawthorns
- First Division: 11th
- FA Cup: Third round
- League Cup: Second round
- Top goalscorer: League: Bob Taylor (17); All: Bob Taylor (20)
- Average home league attendance: 15,061

During the 1995–96 English football season, West Bromwich Albion competed in the Football League First Division.

== Season summary ==
The 1995–96 season was a highly inconsistent one for the club. In October 1995, they were second and hopeful of automatic promotion, but then came a drastic loss of form which, in a fourteen match run, saw them lose 13 games, draw one and win none. They looked set to be relegated to Division Two, but a marked improvement in form during the final four months of the season saw them climb to mid table. Later during the season, the club signed Richard Sneekes from Bolton Wanderers. He would prove an instant hit, scoring ten league goals in less than half a season, and a cult figure with the fans.

== Final league table ==
Pos	Team	Pld	W	D	L	GF	GA	GD	Pts
9	Sheffield United	46	16	14	16	57	54	+3	62
10	Barnsley	46	14	18	14	60	66	−6	60
11	West Bromwich Albion	46	16	12	18	60	68	−8	60
12	Port Vale	46	15	15	16	59	66	−7	60
13	Tranmere Rovers	46	14	17	15	64	60	+4	59

Rules for classification: 1) Points; 2) Goals scored; 3) Goal difference

== Results ==
West Bromwich Albion's score comes first

=== Legend ===
Win	Draw	Loss

=== Football League First Division ===
Date	Opponent	Venue	Result	Attendance	Scorers
12 August 1995	Charlton Athletic	H	1–0	18,593	Gilbert
20 August 1995	Wolverhampton Wanderers	A	1–1	26,329	Taylor
26 August 1995	Ipswich Town	H	0–0	14,470	
30 August 1995	Southend United	A	1–2	4,621	Raven
2 September 1995	Sheffield United	H	3–1	14,377	Burgess, Hamilton, Hunt
9 September 1995	Oldham Athletic	A	2–1	8,397	Taylor, Gilbert
12 September 1995	Tranmere Rovers	A	2–2	7,196	Ashcroft (pen), Hunt
17 September 1995	Birmingham City	H	1–0	18,854	Hunt
24 September 1995	Stoke City	A	1–2	9,612	Hunt
30 September 1995	Huddersfield Town	H	1–2	15,945	Taylor
7 October 1995	Reading	H	2–0	12,907	Gilbert, Taylor
14 October 1995	Luton Town	A	2–1	8,042	Ashcroft, Hunt
21 October 1995	Portsmouth	H	2–1	16,257	Ashcroft, Hunt
28 October 1995	Millwall	A	1–2	9,717	Hunt
5 November 1995	Leicester City	H	2–3	16,071	Raven, Hamilton
11 November 1995	Derby County	A	0–3	13,765	
18 November 1995	Grimsby Town	A	0–1	8,155	
21 November 1995	Norwich City	H	1–4	13,680	Hunt
25 November 1995	Sunderland	H	0–1	17,980	
2 December 1995	Reading	A	1–3	7,910	Ashcroft
9 December 1995	Stoke City	H	0–1	16,872	
16 December 1995	Huddersfield Town	A	1–4	12,664	Hamilton
23 December 1995	Crystal Palace	H	2–3	13,103	Darby, Hunt
26 December 1995	Port Vale	A	1–3	10,807	Gilbert
13 January 1996	Wolverhampton Wanderers	H	0–0	21,658	
20 January 1996	Charlton Athletic	A	1–4	11,864	Hunt
3 February 1996	Ipswich Town	A	1–2	10,798	Taylor
10 February 1996	Southend United	H	3–1	12,906	Hunt, Taylor (2)
17 February 1996	Tranmere Rovers	H	1–1	15,014	Hunt
20 February 1996	Sheffield United	A	2–1	10,944	Burgess, Hunt
27 February 1996	Oldham Athletic	H	1–0	11,956	Taylor
2 March 1996	Port Vale	H	1–1	13,707	Taylor
9 March 1996	Crystal Palace	A	0–1	18,336	
12 March 1996	Watford	H	4–4	11,836	Taylor (3), Sneekes
16 March 1996	Barnsley	H	2–1	12,701	Raven, Sneekes
20 March 1996	Birmingham City	A	1–1	19,147	Sneekes
23 March 1996	Watford	A	1–1	10,334	Taylor
30 March 1996	Portsmouth	A	2–0	8,126	Sneekes (2)
2 April 1996	Luton Town	H	0–2	15,131	
6 April 1996	Millwall	H	1–0	13,793	Sneekes
9 April 1996	Leicester City	A	2–1	17,889	Sneekes, Raven
13 April 1996	Grimsby Town	H	3–1	16,116	Taylor (2), Sneekes
20 April 1996	Norwich City	A	2–2	14,667	Sneekes, Taylor
27 April 1996	Sunderland	A	0–0	22,027	
30 April 1996	Barnsley	A	1–1	6,981	Gilbert
5 May 1996	Derby County	H	3–2	23,858	Sneekes, Hunt, Taylor

=== FA Cup ===
Round	Date	Opponent	Venue	Result	Attendance	Goalscorers
R3	6 January 1996	Crewe Alexandra	A	3–4	5,750	Coldicott, Hunt, Raven

=== League Cup ===
Round	Date	Opponent	Venue	Result	Attendance	Goalscorers
R1 First Leg	15 August 1995	Northampton Town	H	1–1	6,489	Taylor
R1 Second Leg	22 August 1995	Northampton Town	A	4–2	7,083	Taylor (2), Hunt, Donovan
R2 First Leg	20 September 1995	Reading	A	1–1	6,948	Burgess
R2 Second Leg	3 October 1995	Reading	H	2–4	8,163	Donovan, Burgess

== First-team squad ==
Squad at end of season

Note: Flags indicate national team as defined under FIFA eligibility rules; some limited exceptions apply. Players may hold more than one non-FIFA nationality.

No.	Pos.	Nation	Player
—	GK	(England) ENG	Gary Germaine (Note: Germaine was born in Birmingham, England, but also qualified to represent Scotland internationally and would represent them at U-21 level.)
—	GK	(England) ENG	Stuart Naylor
—	GK	(England) ENG	Paul Reece
—	GK	(England) ENG	Nigel Spink
—	DF	(England) ENG	Daryl Burgess
—	DF	(England) ENG	Andy Comyn
—	DF	(England) ENG	Paul Edwards
—	DF	(England) ENG	Shane Nicholson
—	DF	(England) ENG	Paul Raven
—	DF	(Wales) WAL	Paul Mardon (Note: Mardon was born in Bristol, England, but also qualified to represent Wales internationally and made his international debut for Wales in October 1995.)
—	DF	(Northern Ireland) NIR	Paul Agnew
—	DF	(Republic of Ireland) IRL	Tony Brien
—	MF	(England) ENG	Shaun Cunnington
—	MF	(England) ENG	Julian Darby

No.	Pos.	Nation	Player
—	MF	(England) ENG	Kevin Donovan
—	MF	(England) ENG	Stacy Coldicott
—	MF	(England) ENG	Dave Gilbert
—	MF	(England) ENG	Ian Hamilton
—	MF	(England) ENG	Paul Holmes
—	MF	(England) ENG	Mike Phelan
—	MF	(England) ENG	David Smith
—	MF	(Netherlands) NED	Richard Sneekes
—	FW	(England) ENG	Lee Ashcroft
—	FW	(England) ENG	Chris Hargreaves
—	FW	(England) ENG	Andy Hunt
—	FW	(England) ENG	Bob Taylor
—	FW	(Wales) WAL	Tony Rees

=== Left club during season ===
Note: Flags indicate national team as defined under FIFA eligibility rules; some limited exceptions apply. Players may hold more than one non-FIFA nationality.

No.	Pos.	Nation	Player
—	GK	(Northern Ireland) NIR	Alan Fettis (on loan from Hull City)
—	DF	(England) ENG	Phil King (on loan from Aston Villa)

No.	Pos.	Nation	Player
—	MF	(England) ENG	Peter Butler (on loan from Notts County)
—	FW	(England) ENG	Brett Angell (on loan from Sunderland)
