= Lee Ashcroft (English footballer) =

English footballer (born 1972)

Personal information
- Full name: Lee Ashcroft
- Date of birth: 7 September 1972 (age 54)
- Place of birth: Preston, England
- Height: 5 ft 9 in (1.75 m)
- Positions: Winger; striker

Team information
- Current team: Longridge Town (manager)

Senior career*
Years	Team	Apps	(Gls)
1987–1993	Preston North End	91	(13)
1993–1996	West Bromwich Albion	90	(17)
1995	→ Notts County (loan)	6	(0)
1996	→ Preston North End (loan)	7	(3)
1996–1998	Preston North End	50	(16)
1998–2000	Grimsby Town	61	(15)
2000–2002	Wigan Athletic	46	(8)
2002	→ Port Vale (loan)	3	(0)
2002	→ Huddersfield Town (loan)	4	(0)
2003–2004	Southport	36	(13)
2004	→ Chorley (loan)	11	(3)
2004–2010	Kendal Town		
Total		405	(88)

International career
1992	England U21	1	(0)

Managerial career
- 2006–2012: Kendal Town
- 2012–2013: Northwich Victoria
- 2014–: Longridge Town
- * Club domestic league appearances and goals

Lee Ashcroft (born 7 September 1972) is an English former footballer and football manager who manages North West Counties Premier Division club Longridge Town.

An England under-21 international, the striker began his playing career at Preston North End in 1987. Six years later, he was sold to West Bromwich Albion for £250,000. Loaned out to Notts County in 1995, he returned to Preston North End for £150,000 in September 1996. He transferred to Grimsby Town £500,000 in August 1998, before being sold to Wigan Athletic in August 2000 for £350,000. Loaned out to Port Vale and Huddersfield Town, he was released in 2003 and joined Conference club Southport, before ending his career with six years with Kendal Town.

He managed Kendal Town from 2006 until 2012 before taking the management job at Northwich Victoria in November 2012. He lost his job in December 2013 due to a confrontation with an opposition coach. He later became Longridge Town manager. He led the club to the West Lancashire league title in 2017–18 and the North West Counties League Division One North title in 2018–19.

== Playing career ==
Ashcroft made it through the youth ranks at Preston North End, coached by Walter Joyce. He turned professional at the Fourth Division club under John McGrath. Preston won promotion in 1986–87 after finishing as the division's runners-up. After retaining their Third Division status in 1987–88, the "Lilywhites" qualified for the play-offs in 1988–89, but lost out to Port Vale at the semi-final stage. Following this disappointment, they dropped down to just two places outside the relegation zone in 1989–90. Preston finished 17th in 1990–91 and 1991–92 under Les Chapman, before suffering relegation in 1992–93 under the management of John Beck. He later admitted that "I had to get away when John Beck was manager".

In August 1993, Ashcroft moved on to West Bromwich Albion after manager Keith Burkinshaw splashed out £250,000. Ashcroft scored a vital headed goal on the final day of the 1993–94 season, in a 1–0 win at Portsmouth, to keep Albion in the First Division. The club again flirted with relegation in 1994–95 under the stewardship of Alan Buckley, finishing two places above the relegation zone. Ashcroft scored four goals for Albion in 1995–96.

In March 1996, Ashcroft was loaned out to Notts County, playing six games for the club. Colin Murphy's team went on to reach the Second Division play-off final in 1995–96, losing out 2–0 to Bradford City. Still out of the first-team picture at West Brom in 1996–97, he was loaned out to former club Preston North End in September 1996 before Gary Peters made the deal permanent two months later for £150,000. He finished the campaign with eight Second Division goals for Preston, also scoring three goals in cup competitions. He finished as the club's top scorer with 16 goals in 46 games in 1997–98, bagging a hat-trick against Fulham at Deepdale on 29 November.

Ashcroft moved to First Division club Grimsby Town for a club-record £500,000 in August 1998, reuniting him with former manager Alan Buckley. He failed to meet to expectations, scoring just four goals in 29 appearances in 1998–99, spending much of the season out with injury. He found his form though in 1999–2000, scoring 13 goals in 40 games to help the "Mariners" finish five points above the relegation zone.

In August 2000, he moved to Wigan Athletic after manager Bruce Rioch bought the striker for £350,000. He was a replacement for the departed Stuart Barlow. He scored six goals in 36 appearances in 2000–01, helping the "Latics" into the Second Division play-offs, where they were beaten by Reading at the semi-final stage after losing 2–1 at the Madejski Stadium. He scored just three goals in 17 games in 2001–02 whilst picking up seven yellow cards and one sending off. Wigan won promotion at the end of the 2002–03 season under Paul Jewell's stewardship. However, Ashcroft did not feature in any league games at the JJB Stadium. He instead joined Port Vale on loan in October 2002. After four appearances for Brian Horton's "Valiants", he moved on to Huddersfield Town in December of the same year, again on loan. Huddersfield were so short of funds at the time that the loan could only go through when a wealthy supporter agreed to pay Ashcroft's wages. He appeared four times in the Second Division under Mick Wadsworth, before returning to Wigan, where he was released in February 2003. Later in the month he moved down to non-League Southport, taking up the role of player-coach at the age of 30. He scored twice in eleven Conference games, as the "Sandgrounders" were relegated at the end of the 2002–03 season. In March 2004, Ashcroft signed for Chorley on loan, where he scored three goals in eleven appearances in the Northern Premier League First Division. He later moved on to Kendal Town, where he scored 23 goals in the 2004–05 season.

== International career ==
On 12 May 1992 in Budapest, Ashcroft came on as a substitute for his only England under-21 cap against Hungary in a 2–2 draw. He played alongside several future full internationals including Ian Walker and Andy Cole.

== Managerial career ==
=== Kendal Town ===
In November 2006, Ashcroft was promoted from Kendal Town club captain to the position of manager. He led the "Field" to a 19th-place finish in 2006–07 in the Northern Premier League, one place but 12 points above the relegation zone. Following an eleventh-place finish in 2007–08, Kendal qualified for the play-offs in 2008–09, but lost out to Ilkeston Town at the semi-final stage. On 3 October 2009, he was sent off for using "abusive and/or indecently insulting words towards match officials" and was subsequently banned for three months from all football activity (including training sessions). Despite this, he managed the "Town" to another fifth-place finish in 2009–10, though again they lost at the play-off semi-final stage, after defeat to Bradford Park Avenue. Kendal finished seventh in 2010–11, finishing five points outside the play-offs. They finished eleventh in 2011–12, and reached the semi-finals of the Challenge Cup.

=== Northwich Victoria ===
In November 2012, Ashcroft became manager of Northwich Victoria, becoming their fifth permanent manager of the calendar year. They went on to finish eighth in the Northern Premier League Division One South in 2012–13. In the match against Gresley on 12 January, Ashcroft used abusive words towards Gresley coach Hannah Dingley, allegedly concerning her gender. The FA handed Ashcroft a ten-match touchline ban and £1,200 fine – he denied the charge and appealed. Despite the incident, he was still named as the division's manager of the month for January. The suspension was postponed until December 2013. At this point, Ashcroft changed roles at Northwich to director of football as Jim Gannon took over as manager.

=== Longridge Town ===
He went on to manage West Lancashire League side Longridge Town. He led his side to the West Lancashire league Premier Division title in the 2017–18 campaign. He followed that up the following season by gaining a second-successive promotion as Longridge won the North West Counties League Division One North title after scoring 144 goals in 38 games in the 2018–19 season. As a result of the COVID-19 pandemic in England, the 2019–20 season was formally abandoned on 26 March, with all results from the season being expunged, and no promotion or relegation taking place to, from, or within the competition. Longridge were sixth in the North West Counties Premier Division table at the time, with games in hand on the promotion places.

== Personal life ==
His sons, George and Ben Ashcroft, played football with Kendal Town, and Ben also played for Northwich Victoria during his father's reign as manager.

== Career statistics ==
Appearances and goals by club, season and competition
Club	Season	League			FA Cup		Other		Total	
Club	Season	Division	Apps	Goals	Apps	Goals	Apps	Goals	Apps	Goals
Preston North End	1990–91	Third Division	14	1	0	0	3	1	17	2
Preston North End	1991–92	Third Division	38	5	3	0	4	0	45	5
Preston North End	1992–93	Second Division	39	7	2	0	4	0	45	7
Preston North End	Total		91	13	5	0	11	1	107	14
West Bromwich Albion	1993–94	First Division	21	3	1	0	8	0	30	3
West Bromwich Albion	1994–95	First Division	38	10	2	1	1	0	41	11
West Bromwich Albion	1995–96	First Division	26	4	1	0	7	0	34	4
West Bromwich Albion	1996–97	First Division	5	0	0	0	1	0	6	0
West Bromwich Albion	Total		90	17	4	1	17	0	111	18
Notts County (loan)	1995–96	Second Division	6	0	0	0	0	0	6	0
Preston North End	1996–97	Second Division	20	5	2	3	1	0	23	8
Preston North End	1997–98	Second Division	37	14	3	2	6	0	46	16
Preston North End	Total		57	19	5	5	7	0	69	24
Grimsby Town	1998–99	First Division	27	3	0	0	2	1	29	4
Grimsby Town	1999–2000	First Division	34	12	1	0	5	1	40	13
Grimsby Town	Total		61	15	1	0	7	2	69	17
Wigan Athletic	2000–01	Second Division	30	5	3	1	3	0	36	6
Wigan Athletic	2001–02	Second Division	16	3	1	0	0	0	17	3
Wigan Athletic	2002–03	Second Division	0	0	0	0	1	0	1	0
Wigan Athletic	Total		46	8	4	1	4	0	54	9
Port Vale (loan)	2002–03	Second Division	3	0	0	0	1	0	4	0
Huddersfield Town (loan)	2002–03	Second Division	4	0	0	0	0	0	4	0
Southport	2002–03	Conference	11	2	0	0	1	0	12	2
Southport	2003–04	Northern Premier League; Premier Division	25	11	1	1	5	1	31	13
Southport	2004–05	Conference North	0	0	0	0	0	0	0	0
Southport	Total		36	13	1	1	6	1	43	15
Chorley (loan)	2003–04	Northern Premier League; First Division	11	3	0	0	0	0	11	3
Career total			405	88	20	8	53	4	478	100

== Honours ==
=== as a Player ===
Preston North End

- Football League Fourth Division second-place promotion: 1986–87

Individual

- Northern Premier League Division One South Manager of the Month: January 2013

=== as a Manager ===
Longridge Town

- West Lancashire league: 2017–18
- North West Counties League Division One North: 2018–19
