= Steve Lilwall =

English footballer

Personal information
- Date of birth: 15 February 1970 (Note: Club-based sources including those of West Bromwich Albion Former Players Association and Rushden & Diamonds F.C., a contemporary match programme, and Barry Hugman's PFA Premier & Football League Players' Records 1946–1998 all state 15 February 1970 as Lilwall's date of birth. It would appear that the date of 5 February, as given by Hugman's website and Neil Brown's UK A–Z Transfers, stems from a typographical error.)
- Place of birth: Solihull, England
- Height: 5 ft 10 in (1.78 m)
- Position: Left back

Youth career
- Silhill

Senior career*
Years	Team	Apps	(Gls)
198?–1987	Moor Green		
1987–1992	Kidderminster Harriers	65	(4)
1992–1995	West Bromwich Albion	73	(0)
1995–1997	Rushden & Diamonds	11	(0)
1997–????	Kidderminster Harriers	7	(0)
- Moor Green
- * Club domestic league appearances and goals

Stephen Lilwall (born 15 February 1970) is an English former professional footballer who made 73 appearances in the Football League for West Bromwich Albion. He also played non-league football for Moor Green, Kidderminster Harriers and Rushden & Diamonds. He played as a left back.

== Life and career ==
Lilwall was born in Solihull. His uncle, Denis Thwaites, played professional football for Birmingham City in the 1960s. Lilwall played youth football for Silhill before joining Moor Green during the 1985–66 season. In 1987, he moved on to Kidderminster Harriers. Lilwall made his Conference debut in the 1989–90 season, and became a first-team regular during the following campaign. He helped Kidderminster reach the final of the 1990–91 FA Trophy, in which he created two chances for team-mates – both missed – and drew a good save from Wycombe Wanderers' goalkeeper as Kidderminster lost 2–1. Lilwall remained with Kidderminster for a further season, taking his Conference appearance total to 65, and then became Osvaldo Ardiles' first signing as manager of Second Division (third-tier) club West Bromwich Albion for a fee of around £70,000.

He went straight into the Albion first team, and by September 1992 Premier League club Liverpool were reported to be "monitoring [his] progress". He was ever-present during his first season, and was a member of the team that gained promotion to the First Division via the play-offs, beating Port Vale 3–0 in the final after Vale had a man sent off. After Alan Buckley became manager and Lilwall fell victim to a succession of injuries, he drifted out of first-team consideration. He left Albion at the end of the 1994–95 season, having made 73 appearances in Football League competition, and signed for Rushden & Diamonds of the Southern League.

Injury also disrupted his time with Rushden & Diamonds. He contributed only seven Southern League games as his team won the 1995–96 Southern League title, and the following season played just four times in the 1996–97 Conference. In 1997, he rejoined Kidderminster Harriers, but appeared only infrequently for the first team, and ended his senior career back at Moor Green.

Lilwall took a degree in Physical Education and Social Psychology at Coventry University, and also earned a diploma in Sports Psychology and the UEFA A Licence football coaching qualification. He trained as a teacher, and taught physical education at Ninestiles School in Acocks Green, Birmingham, as well as running a soccer school in the Solihull area.

== Honours ==
West Bromwich Albion

- Football League Second Division play-offs: 1993
