= 1992–93 West Bromwich Albion F.C. season =

West Bromwich Albion
1992–93 season
- Manager: Osvaldo Ardiles
- Stadium: The Hawthorns
- Second Division: 4th (promoted via play-offs)
- FA Cup: Third round (eliminated by West Ham United)
- League Cup: First round (eliminated by Plymouth Argyle)
- FL Trophy: Third round (eliminated by Stoke City)

The 1992–93 season was West Bromwich Albion's 115th season in existence and second consecutive season in the third tier of English football, now known as the Football League Second Division because of the creation of the Premier League. West Brom finished 4th in the Second Division, qualifying them for the play-offs, through which they were promoted after beating Port Vale 3–0 in the final. The club also competed in the FA Cup, (eliminated in the third round), the League Cup (eliminated in the first round) and the Football League Trophy (eliminated in the third round).

== Competitions ==
=== Second Division ===
==== League table ====
Pos	Team	Pld	W	D	L	GF	GA	GD	Pts	Qualification or relegation
2	Bolton Wanderers (P)	46	27	9	10	80	41	+39	90	Promotion to the First Division
3	Port Vale	46	26	11	9	79	44	+35	89	Qualification for the Second Division play-offs
4	West Bromwich Albion (O, P)	46	25	10	11	88	54	+34	85	Qualification for the Second Division play-offs
5	Swansea City	46	20	13	13	65	47	+18	73	Qualification for the Second Division play-offs
6	Stockport County	46	19	15	12	81	57	+24	72	Qualification for the Second Division play-offs

Rules for classification: 1) Points; 2) Goals scored; 3) Goal difference
(O) Play-off winners; (P) Promoted

==== Matches ====
Second Division match results
Date	Opponent	Venue	Result F–A	Scorers	Attendance
15 August 1992	Blackpool	H	3–1	Taylor (2), McNally	16,527
22 August 1992	Huddersfield Town	A	1–0	Garner	7,947
29 August 1992	Bournemouth	H	2–1	Taylor, Shakespeare (pen.)	12,563
2 September 1992	Stockport County	H	3–0	Garner (2), Hamilton	12,305
5 September 1992	Fulham	A	1–1	Taylor	9,143
9 September 1992	Reading	H	3–0	Garner, Taylor, Shakespeare	13,164
15 September 1992	Bolton Wanderers	A	2–0	Taylor (2)	8,531
19 September 1992	Stoke City	A	3–4	Taylor (2), Garner	18,764
26 September 1992	Exeter City	H	2–0	Hamilton, McNally	14,676
3 October 1992	Burnley	A	1–2	Garner	14,816
10 October 1992	Port Vale	H	0–1		17,512
17 October 1992	Wigan Athletic	A	0–1		4,408
24 October 1992	Rotherham United	H	2–2	Taylor, Donovan	13,170
31 October 1992	Hull City	A	2–1	Garner, Bradley	5,443
3 November 1992	Hartlepool United	H	3–1	Taylor, Blissett, Robson	13,046
7 November 1992	Leyton Orient	A	0–2		8,640
21 November 1992	Bradford City	H	1–1	Raven	15,416
28 November 1992	Preston North End	A	1–1	Robson	6,306
12 December 1992	Swansea City	A	0–0		5,610
20 December 1992	Mansfield Town	H	2–0	McNally, Darton	13,134
26 December 1992	Chester City	H	2–0	Raven (2)	15,209
28 December 1992	Plymouth Argyle	A	0–0		11,370
9 January 1993	Bolton Wanderers	H	3–1	Hamilton, Strodder, Taylor	14,581
16 January 1993	Exeter City	A	3–2	Heggs, Hackett, Hamilton (pen.)	5,437
23 January 1993	Stoke City	H	1–2	Taylor	29,341
26 January 1993	Bournemouth	A	1–0	Speedie	5,867
30 January 1993	Huddersfield Town	H	2–2	Donovan, Speedie	13,667
6 February 1993	Blackpool	A	1–2	Taylor	9,386
13 February 1993	Fulham	H	4–0	Taylor (pen.), Hamilton, Mellon, Fereday	12,859
20 February 1993	Stockport County	A	1–5	Taylor	7,181
27 February 1993	Port Vale	A	1–2	Hamilton	13,291
6 March 1993	Burnley	H	2–0	Garner, Taylor	15,722
10 March 1993	Brighton & Hove Albion	A	1–3	Taylor (pen.)	7,440
13 March 1993	Leyton Orient	H	2–0	Burgess, Donovan	15,023
20 March 1993	Hartlepool United	A	2–2	Hamilton, Raven	4,174
24 March 1993	Preston North End	H	3–2	Taylor (2), Mellon	13,270
28 March 1993	Bradford City	A	2–2	Taylor (pen.), Hunt	6,627
3 April 1993	Brighton & Hove Albion	H	3–1	Hunt (3)	13,002
7 April 1993	Swansea City	H	3–0	Taylor (2), Hunt	13,401
10 April 1993	Chester City	A	3–1	Hunt, Raven, Donovan	4,812
12 April 1993	Plymouth Argyle	H	2–5	Taylor, Donovan	16,130
17 April 1993	Mansfield Town	A	3–0	Hunt, Taylor, Heggs	6,659
21 April 1993	Reading	A	1–1	Taylor	8,026
24 April 1993	Wigan Athletic	H	5–1	Taylor (2), Mellon, Donovan, Raven	14,867
1 May 1993	Rotherham United	A	2–0	Raven, Taylor	8,059
8 May 1993	Hull City	H	3–1	Taylor, Hunt (2)	20,122

==== Play-offs ====
Second Division play-off match results
Round	Date	Opponent	Venue	Result F–A	Scorers	Attendance
Semi-final first leg	16 May 1993	Swansea City	A	1–2	McFarland (o.g.)	13,917
Semi-final second leg	19 May 1993	Swansea City	H	2–0	Hunt, Hamilton	26,045
Final	30 May 1993	Port Vale	N	3–0	Hunt, Reid, Donovan	53,471

=== FA Cup ===
FA Cup match results
Round	Date	Opponent	Venue	Result F–A	Scorers	Attendance
First round	14 November 1992	Aylesbury United	H	8–0	McNally, Robson, Donovan (3), Raven, Taylor, Hamilton	12,337
Second round	6 December 1992	Wycombe Wanderers	A	2–2	Taylor, Bradley	6,904
Second round replay	15 December 1992	Wycombe Wanderers	H	1–0	Taylor	17,640
Third round	2 January 1993	West Ham United	H	0–2		25,896

=== Football League Cup ===
Football League Cup match results
Round	Date	Opponent	Venue	Result F–A	Scorers	Attendance
First round, first leg	19 August 1992	Plymouth Argyle	H	1–0	Taylor	8,264
First round, second leg	25 August 1992	Plymouth Argyle	A	0–2		7,880

=== Football League Trophy ===
Group 6
Team	Pld	W	D	L	GF	GA	GD	Pts
West Brom	2	2	0	0	5	0	+5	6
Walsall	2	1	0	1	2	4	−2	3
Mansfield Town	2	0	0	2	0	3	−3	0

Football League Trophy match results
Round	Date	Opponent	Venue	Result F–A	Scorers	Attendance
Group stage	5 January 1993	Walsall	H	4–0	Heggs, Taylor, Donovan, Hamilton	6,702
Group stage	12 January 1993	Mansfield Town	A	1–0	Taylor	2,356
Second round	9 February 1993	Torquay United	H	2–1	Donovan (2)	5,219
Third round	16 February 1993	Stoke City	A	1–2	Taylor	17,568
