= Simon Garner =

English footballer (born 1959)

Personal information
- Date of birth: 23 November 1959 (age 66)
- Place of birth: Boston, Lincolnshire, England
- Height: 5 ft 8 in (1.73 m)
- Position: Striker

Youth career
- 1976-1978: Blackburn Rovers

Senior career*
Years	Team	Apps	(Gls)
1978–1992	Blackburn Rovers	484	(169)
1992–1994	West Bromwich Albion	33	(8)
1994–1996	Wycombe Wanderers	66	(15)
1996	→ Torquay United (loan)	20	(1)
1996	Woking	0	(0)
1996	→ Walton & Hersham (loan)	1	(1)
1997-1998	Wealdstone	54	(18)
1997	Dagenham & Redbridge	1	
1998-1999	Windsor & Eton	43	(13)
1999-2000	Flackwell Heath		
Total		603	(193)
- * Club domestic league appearances and goals

Simon Garner (born 23 November 1959) is an English former professional footballer who spent the majority of his career playing for Blackburn Rovers, where he is the record holder for most goals scored: 194 in all competitions and 168 in the Football League. He also played for West Bromwich Albion, Wycombe Wanderers and Torquay United before spending time playing non-league football.

== Career ==
Born in Boston, Lincolnshire, Garner was educated in his hometown at Boston Grammar School. He played for local club Boston United before joining Blackburn Rovers as an apprentice, turning professional in July 1978. His debut came the following season at Newcastle United in the Second Division, the first of 474 league games for Rovers, in which he scored a club-record 168 league goals. Rovers were relegated in Garner's first season as a senior player, but he helped them win promotion at the first attempt, and they only narrowly missed out on a second successive promotion in 1981.

By 1982–83, Garner was established as one of the Second Division's leading marksmen, when he scored 22 league goals.

Garner scored 14 league goals in the 1987–88 season, when they qualified for the recently introduced playoffs, but defeat in the semi-finals denied them promotion. They reached the playoff final a year later and looked to have secured First Division football after beating Crystal Palace, but were heavily beaten by Palace in the return leg and missed out on promotion again. In 1990, Rovers suffered a third successive playoff defeat. Garner found the net 20 times in the league that season, in a successful partnership up front with Howard Gayle.

In his final season at Ewood Park, he helped fulfil chairman Jack Walker's dream as Blackburn were promoted in time for the inaugural Premier League season, although he played fewer games that campaign following the arrival of new signings including David Speedie and Mike Newell, and then came the summer signing of Alan Shearer. Garner had scored a total of 168 goals in the league and a total of 192 in all competitions – which remains a club record more than quarter of a century later. In February 2019 he was one of the first seven players to be inducted into the club's Hall of Fame.

After his long spell at Rovers, he moved to West Bromwich Albion for £30,000 in August 1992 and made 33 league appearances for the Baggies, scoring eight league goals and helping them win promotion from Division Two before moving to Wycombe Wanderers.

He first played a league match for Wycombe in the 1993–94 season and helped the club to promotion from the Third Division, scoring a goal in the play-off final at Wembley against Preston North End. Following Martin O'Neill's departure as manager, he fell out of favour with new boss Alan Smith and went on loan at Torquay United, playing 11 league games for the Gulls. He had a brief stint with Woking in 1996, before spending a couple of years with non-league Wealdstone, where he helped the side to win the Isthmian League Third Division – the only league title of his career. He would go on to turn out for Dagenham & Redbridge, Windsor & Eton and Flackwell Heath before finally retiring from football in 2000.

== Personal life ==
In 1996, Garner served a brief sentence in prison for contempt of court during his divorce proceedings. He was released after a successful appeal.

After working in mortgage sales and as a postman, Garner became a painter and decorator based in Berkshire.

== Honours ==
Blackburn Rovers

- Full Members' Cup: 1986–87

West Bromwich Albion

- Football League Second Division play-offs: 1993

Wycombe Wanderers

- Football League Third Division play-offs: 1994
