= Scott Darton =

English footballer

Personal information
- Full name: Scott Richard Darton
- Date of birth: 27 March 1975 (age 51)
- Place of birth: Ipswich, England
- Position: Defender

Youth career
- West Bromwich Albion

Senior career*
Years	Team	Apps	(Gls)
1992–1995	West Bromwich Albion	15	(0)
1995–1997	Blackpool	29	(1)
1997–1998	King's Lynn	?	(?)
1998–????	Ipswich Wanderers	?	(?)
- Cambridge City
- Heybridge Swifts
- St Albans City
- Chelmsford City
- Ipswich Wanderers
Total		44	(1)
- * Club domestic league appearances and goals

Scott Richard Darton (born 27 March 1975) is an English former professional footballer. He played at left-back.

Darton began his career as a trainee with West Bromwich Albion, turning professional in October 1992. He remained at The Hawthorns, making fifteen league appearances, until January 1995 when he joined Sam Allardyce's Blackpool. In two years with the Seasiders he made 29 appearances and scored one goal, his only goal in the Football League.

He joined Torquay United on trial on 3 October 1996 with a view to signing on loan. He played for Torquay's reserve side against Taunton Town, but was not signed.

Darton moved into non-league football with King's Lynn in 1997. He subsequently played for Ipswich Wanderers, Cambridge City, Heybridge Swifts, St Albans City and Chelmsford City, from where he returned to Ipswich Wanderers in July 2001.
