= Richard Sneekes =

Dutch footballer

Personal information
- Full name: Richard Sneekes
- Date of birth: 30 October 1968 (age 57)
- Place of birth: Amsterdam, Netherlands
- Height: 5 ft 11 in (1.80 m)
- Position: Midfielder

Youth career
- -1982: DWS
- 1982–1984: Ajax

Senior career*
Years	Team	Apps	(Gls)
1984–1989	Ajax	3	(0)
1989–1990	Volendam	31	(7)
1990–1994	Fortuna Sittard	126	(20)
1994	FC Locarno	26	(13)
1994–1996	Bolton Wanderers	71	(11)
1996–2001	West Bromwich Albion	227	(30)
2001	Stockport County	9	(0)
2001–2002	Hull City	22	(0)
2002–2003	Herfølge BK		
2007	Hinckley United	3	(0)
2010	Dudley Town	5	(0)
Total		546	(85)

International career
1982–1984	Netherlands Schoolboys	22	(0)
1988–1989	Netherlands U21	2	(0)

Managerial career
- 2010–2011: Tamworth (academy coach)
- 2011: Hereford United (First Team Coach)
- 2014–2016: Rushall Olympic
- 2016–2018: Sutton Coldfield Town
- 2018: Halesowen Town (First Team Coach)
- 2024: Rushall Olympic (First Team Coach)
- 2024–2025: Rushall Olympic
- * Club domestic league appearances and goals

Richard Sneekes (born 30 October 1968) is a Dutch football manager and former professional footballer. He is currently technical advisor of Rushall Olympic.

As a player, he was a midfielder who notably played in the Premier League with Bolton Wanderers and in the Eredivisie with Ajax and Fortuna Sittard. He also played in the Football League with West Bromwich Albion, Stockport County and Hull City, in Switzerland with FC Locarno, in Norway with Herfølge BK and in his native country with Volendam. Initially retiring in 2003, he later came out of retirement and had two spells with non-league sides Hinckley United and Dudley Town. He was capped twice at Netherlands U21 level.

Since retirement, Sneekes has remained in England and has coached at non-league level for Tamworth and Hereford United. He has also had spells as manager of Rushall Olympic and Sutton Coldfield Town.

== Playing career ==
=== Ajax and Fortuna Sittard ===
Sneekes started as a Youth player at amateur club DWS and went to Ajax Amsterdam at the age of 14, he made 22 appearances for Netherlands National Schoolboys. He made his debut for Ajax at the age of 16, and broke through into the Netherlands U21 team, but never quite fulfilled his potential for the club and was transferred out at the age of 21.

After a short spell at Volendam Sneekes signed for Fortuna Sittard and spent four years at the club after which he moved to FC Locarno in Switzerland before being transferred to England.

=== Bolton Wanderers ===
Sneekes first came to prominence in England when he signed for Bolton Wanderers in August 1994 for £200,000. He was part of their team that won promotion to the Premier League that season. Bolton struggled in the Premier League and he was transferred shortly before the end of the season. Whilst at Bolton he played in the 1995 Football League Cup Final.

=== West Bromwich Albion ===
Alan Buckley signed the Dutchman for West Bromwich Albion in March 1996 for £400,000. Despite Buckley claiming it would be a while before he made any difference, Sneekes almost immediately became a cult hero at The Hawthorns. Sneekes was an overnight sensation, and many of the Baggies crowd took to wearing long blond wigs - even the club shop was selling them. Sneekes finished his first season with ten goals from thirteen games, arguably for some Albion fans saving them from relegation. Sneekes spent seven seasons at West Brom before finally being transferred at the start of the 2001–02 season. After Sneekes' retirement in 2007, he went on to captain West Bromwich Albion in the Midlands 'Masters' and has done so ever since. He scored in the 2008 and 2011 tournaments.

=== Stockport, Hull and Herfølge ===
He moved to Stockport County on a free transfer in September 2001, but stayed just two months before a move to Hull City. That move also didn't work out and he left the latter club in May 2002. A further year was spent with Danish club Herfølge BK, before retiring from the professional game at the age of 34.

=== Hinckley United ===
Sneekes was convinced to come out of retirement following a chance meeting with Hinckley United manager Dean Thomas, at the Hong Kong Sixes tournament in July 2007. Sneekes initially trained with the Conference North club, but then decided to sign for them. However his debut was put on hold as his International Clearance was sought after last playing in Denmark. He eventually made his debut in Hinckley's 4-2 FA Cup win over Grantham Town in September 2007. However, a disastrous start for Hinckley United in the league meant that Sneekes was released, after playing only three games for the club, in October 2007. Sneekes immediately went back into retirement, saying "The fact that I was not really enjoying it meant that it became too much of a chore to do it".

=== Dudley Town ===
On Monday 27 September 2010, it was revealed in local newspapers that Richard Sneekes had signed for Dudley Town, who play in the West Midlands (Regional) League Premier Division. Richard Sneekes' son, Giorgio also signed for the club in the 2010/2011 season. Richard made his debut in Dudley's 2–2 draw at Shifnal Town on 5 October 2010.

== Coaching career ==
On 29 May 2010, Sneekes was announced as an assistant Academy Coach to Dale Belford where he will be developing Tamworth youth talent.

At 11:15am, 4 July 2011, Sneekes was announced as a First Team Coach at League Two Hereford United, in order to fill the gap left by Dave Kevan who left for Stoke City. It is said that he will look encourage "nice attractive football". He left the club once his contract expired at the end of June.

On 15 May 2014, Sneekes was unveiled as the new manager of Rushall Olympic. This is Sneekes first solo role as manager of a senior club. He will be assisted by Steve Hinks, with CB radio support from Daryl Burgess.

In November 2016 he was named as the new manager of Sutton Coldfield Town, replacing Neil Tooth.

In December 2024, having been appointed interim manager following the sacking of Adam Stevens, Sneekes was appointed permanent manager of National League North bottom side Rushall Olympic for a second spell. Having been unable to prevent the club from relegation, he stepped down from his role as manager and became technical advisor.

== Honours ==
Bolton Wanderers

- Football League Cup runner-up: 1994–95
