= Paul Agnew (footballer) =

Northern Irish footballer

Personal information
- Date of birth: 15 August 1965 (age 61)
- Place of birth: Lisburn, Northern Ireland
- Height: 5 ft 9 in (1.75 m)
- Position: Defender

Senior career*
Years	Team	Apps	(Gls)
1982–1984	Cliftonville		
1984–1995	Grimsby Town	243	(3)
1995–1997	West Bromwich Albion	39	(1)
1997	Swansea City	7	(0)
1997–1999	Wisbech Town		
- * Club domestic league appearances and goals

Paul Agnew (born 15 August 1965) is a Northern Irish football coach and former footballer who played as a defender.

Agnew played competitive football between the years of 1982 and 1999, notably in the Football League for Grimsby Town, West Bromwich Albion and Swansea City. He also had spells with Cliftonville and Wisbech Town.

== Club career ==
Agnew was born in Lisburn in 1965, and joined Cliftonville in 1982. Two years later he joined Grimsby Town, where he remained for the next 11 years of his career. Whilst at Blundell Park he helped the club to two back to back promotions under manager Alan Buckley. In 1995 Agnew followed Buckley to West Bromwich Albion, and was one of many players that transferred to and from Albion and Grimsby in the years surrounding Buckley's departure to Albion, and eventually re-appointment at Grimsby.

In 1997, he joined Swansea City on non-contract terms, and played seven times before being released. He then switched to Non League club Wisbech Town to play under his former Grimsby teammate Gary Childs, who at the time was the new Wisbech player-manager. Agnew left Wisbech and retired from competitive football at the end of the 1998–1999 season.

== Coaching career ==
Agnew became qualified in coaching in 2000, and after working for Birmingham FA, he moved on to coach youngsters of Whittington F.C.
