= Gary Germaine =

English footballer

Personal information
- Date of birth: 2 August 1976 (age 50)
- Place of birth: Birmingham, England
- Position: Goalkeeper

Senior career*
Years	Team	Apps	(Gls)
1994–1998	West Bromwich Albion	88	(0)
1995–1996	→ Telford United (loan)	26	
1996	→ Scunthorpe United (loan)	18	(0)
1998	→ Shrewsbury Town (loan)	6	(0)
	43 Grantham Town Nashville Metros Wichita Wings	43	

International career
1997	Scotland U21	12	(0)
- * Club domestic league appearances and goals

Gary Germaine (born 2 August 1976) is a former professional footballer, who played for Scunthorpe United and Shrewsbury Town in the Football League. He also played in the US for Wichita Wings, Major Indoor Soccer League, Kansas City Wizards, Major League Soccer and Nashville Metros - USL1. After retiring from Soccer, Germaine spent a brief time trying his hand at becoming an NFL field goal kicker with the Tennessee Titans.
