= Craig Herbert =

English footballer (born 1975)

Personal information
- Full name: Craig Justin Herbert
- Date of birth: 9 November 1975 (age 50)
- Place of birth: Coventry, England
- Height: 5 ft 11 in (1.80 m)
- Position: Defender

Team information
- Current team: Barwell

Youth career
- 1993–1994: Torquay United

Senior career*
Years	Team	Apps	(Gls)
1994–1997	West Bromwich Albion	8	(0)
1997–2000	Shrewsbury Town	35	(0)
2001	Rugby United		
2001	Hayes	1	(0)
2001–2002	Rugby United		
2002	Moor Green	0	(0)
2002–2005	Rugby United		
2005	Solihull Borough		
2005–200	Rugby Town		
2009–	Barwell		
- * Club domestic league appearances and goals

Craig Justin Herbert (born 9 November 1975) is an English footballer who plays as a defender for Barwell.

== Career ==
Herbert began his career as an apprentice with Torquay United, but was one of five trainees who left Plainmoor under a cloud on 23 February 1994. The following month he signed for West Bromwich Albion, the Baggies paying Torquay a fee of £10,000 with another £6,000 due after 20 first team appearances and 15% of any future sell-on fee, even though he had never appeared in the Gulls first team. However, the additional fees never transpired as he played just eight league games for West Brom and was released on a free transfer at the end of the 1996–97 season.

In July 1997 he joined Shrewsbury Town, but, due to injury, played just 41 times in total before being released in May 2000. He had a trial with Boston United in July 2000.

In October 2000 he had a trial with York City and in January 2001 joined Rugby United. He had a trial with Kidderminster Harriers in March 2001 before joining Hayes later the same month, despite being linked with Bromsgrove Rovers. He played for Hayes against Yeovil in the first-ever live televised Conference game. However, he was released by Hayes the following month and rejoined Rugby United where he was appointed club captain for the following season.

He remained with Rugby until August 2002 when he joined Moor Green. He then rejoined Rugby and stayed until the end of 2004–05 when he followed manager Tony Dobson to Solihull Borough. However, in October 2005 he returned again to Rugby Town.

Herbert was appointed Rugby's caretaker manager in December 2007 following Billy Jeffrey's resignation and secured two wins and a draw before Rod Brown took over in January 2008. He was again appointed as caretaker manager in September 2008 after Brown left.
