= Stuart Naylor =

English footballer (born 1962)

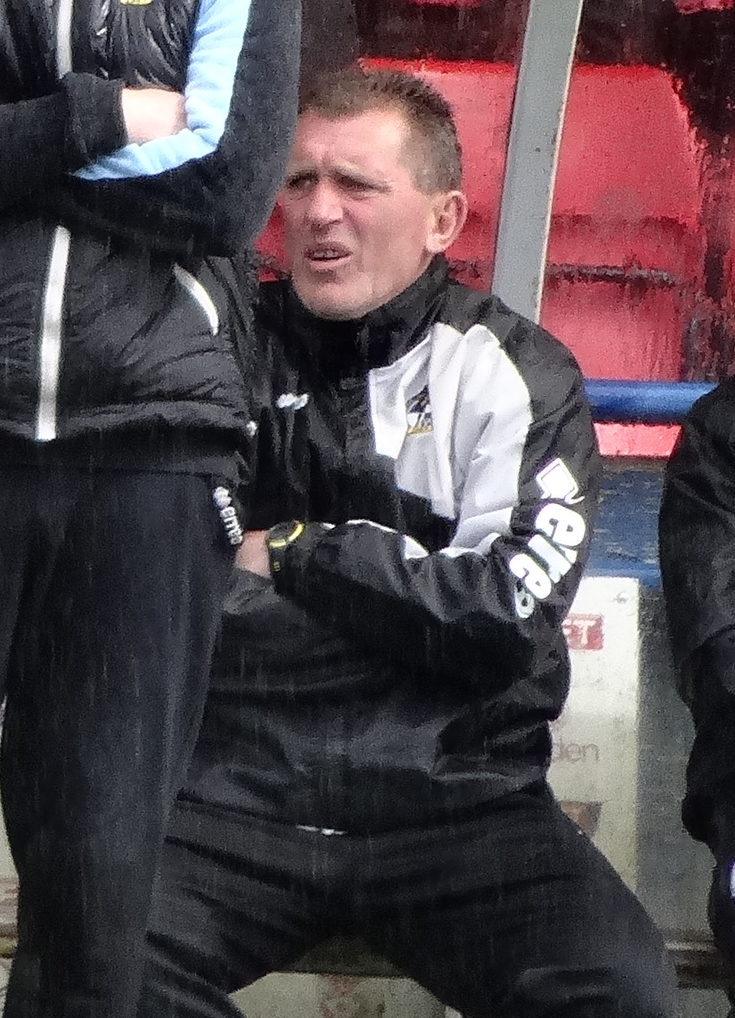
- Naylor with Bristol Rovers in 2016

Personal information
- Full name: Stuart William Naylor
- Date of birth: 6 December 1962 (age 63)
- Place of birth: Wetherby, England
- Height: 6 ft 4 in (1.93 m)
- Position: Goalkeeper

Team information
- Current team: Bristol Rovers (goalkeeping coach)

Youth career
- 1978–1979: Yorkshire Amateur
- 1979–1980: Lincoln City

Senior career*
Years	Team	Apps	(Gls)
1980–1986	Lincoln City	49	(0)
1983	→ Peterborough United (loan)	8	(0)
1983–1984	→ Crewe Alexandra (loan)	38	(0)
1984–1985	→ Crewe Alexandra (loan)	17	(0)
1986–1996	West Bromwich Albion	355	(0)
1996–1999	Bristol City	37	(0)
1998–1999	→ Mansfield Town (loan)	6	(0)
1999–2000	Exeter City	30	(0)
2000	→ Rushden & Diamonds (loan)	2	(0)
2000–2002	Rushden & Diamonds	1	(0)
Total		543	(0)

International career
1980	England Youth	1	(0)
1989	England B	3	(0)
- * Club domestic league appearances and goals

Stuart William Naylor (born 6 December 1962) is an English professional football coach and former player.

== Early life ==
Naylor was born in Wetherby, West Riding of Yorkshire.

== Playing career ==
Naylor had a trial with Leeds United in 1977, but did not sign for the club and the following year joined Yorkshire Amateur. He signed schoolboy forms with Lincoln City in February 1979 before turning professional in June 1980. During his time at Lincoln he spent time on loan at Kettering Town, Peterborough United and Crewe Alexandra. In February 1986 he moved to West Bromwich Albion for a £110,000 transfer fee. He also played for Bristol City, Mansfield Town (on loan), Exeter City and Rushden & Diamonds, as well as winning three caps for the England B team. In May 1985 he was to witness a nightmare when 56 spectators were killed in a horrendous stand fire while playing for Lincoln against Bradford City.

== Coaching career ==
At the end of his playing career, Naylor moved into coaching, joining Rushden & Diamonds permanently as a goalkeeping coach and back-up goalkeeper on 14 June 2000. Naylor would make a final Football Conference appearance as a substitute, following the sending-off of Billy Turley, in the 3–2 away defeat to Doncaster Rovers on 11 November 2000 with his final first team game being a 2–0 Football League Trophy defeat away to Barnet on 28 November 2000. In March 2004 Rushden's manager Brian Talbot departed for Oldham Athletic and Naylor swiftly followed him, becoming goalkeeping coach for the Boundary Park based club. In July 2005 he moved as goalkeeping coach to Bristol City. In March 2013, Naylor moved to Bristol Rovers as a full-time goalkeeper coach up until the end of the 2012–13 season. His contract was extended in May 2013.
