= Tony Lange =

English footballer

Personal information
- Full name: Anthony Stephen Lange
- Date of birth: 10 December 1964 (age 61)
- Place of birth: West Ham, England
- Height: 6 ft 0 in (1.83 m)
- Position: Goalkeeper

Youth career
- Bromley District
- Charlton Athletic

Senior career*
| Years | Team | Apps | (Gls) |
| 1983–1986 | Charlton Athletic | 12 | (0) |
| 1985 | → Aldershot (loan) | 7 | (0) |
| 1986–1988 | Aldershot | 125 | (0) |
| 1988–1992 | Wolverhampton Wanderers | 8 | (0) |
| 1990 | → Aldershot (loan) | 2 | (0) |
| 1991 | → Torquay United (loan) | 1 | (0) |
| 1992 | → Portsmouth (loan) | 0 | (0) |
| 1992–1995 | West Bromwich Albion | 48 | (0) |
| 1995–1997 | Fulham | 59 | (0) |
- St. Leonards Stamcroft
| Total | | 262 | (0) |
- * Club domestic league appearances and goals

Anthony Stephen Lange (born 10 December 1964) is an English retired professional footballer who played as a goalkeeper. Lange made over 250 appearances in the Football League between 1983 and 1997.

== Career ==
Born in West Ham, Lange was playing for the Bromley District side when he signed for Charlton Athletic, turning professional in 1983. He later played for Aldershot, Wolverhampton Wanderers, Torquay United, Portsmouth, West Bromwich Albion, Fulham and St. Leonards Stamcroft.

At Aldershot, Lange was the club's Player of the Year in both the 1986–87 and 1987–88 seasons. He also won promotion to the Third Division with the club in the 1986–87 season. He moved to Wolverhampton Wanderers in 1988 for a fee of £150,000, which was Aldershot's record transfer fee.

While at West Bromwich Albion, Lange won promotion via the play-offs in the 1992–93 season, with Lange appearing in the final. While at the club he was nicknamed "Freddie" due to his appearance being similar to Freddie Mercury.

Lange was a member of the Fulham team which was runner-up in Division Three in the 1996–97 season.

== Later life ==
After retiring as a player, Lange worked as a landscape gardener and for Southern Railway. Lange also played for the West Bromwich Albion Masters side.

== Honours ==
Aldershot

- Football League Fourth Division play-offs: 1987

West Bromwich Albion

- Football League Second Division play-offs: 1993
