= Darren Bradley =

English footballer

Personal information
- Full name: Darren Michael Bradley
- Date of birth: 24 November 1965 (age 60)
- Place of birth: Kings Norton, England
- Height: 5 ft 10 in (1.78 m)
- Position: Midfielder

Youth career
- 1983–1984: Aston Villa

Senior career*
Years	Team	Apps	(Gls)
1984–1986	Aston Villa	20	(0)
1986–1995	West Bromwich Albion	254	(9)
1995–1997	Walsall	71	(1)

International career
1984	England Youth	3	(2)
1985	England U19	3	(0)
- * Club domestic league appearances and goals

Darren Michael Bradley (born 24 November 1965) is an English former professional footballer, who played as a midfielder for Aston Villa, West Bromwich Albion and Walsall. He also represented England at youth level.

== Aston Villa ==
Darren first came to notice to Villa scouts while at secondary school in Kings Norton, before signing for the Villans as an apprentice in 1983. Darren went on to break into the first team under Graham Turner, making 20 appearances.

== West Bromwich Albion ==
Darren moved to The Hawthorns on 14 March 1986, in a deal that saw Stephen Hunt move in the opposite direction. He went on to spend the majority of his career at West Brom, becoming the captain of the club. Though not a prolific goalscorer, Darren is best remembered amongst West Brom fans for a spectacular 30-yard goal against archrivals Wolverhampton Wanderers, helping them to a 3–2 victory in the Black Country derby in August 1993. For his efforts in the 1992–1993 season, Darren was voted into the PFA team of the year.

== Walsall ==
After being released by manager Alan Buckley in 1995, Darren spent two years at Walsall before retiring in 1997.

== After retirement ==
Since retirement, Darren has played for Aston Villa Old Stars, a charity fund-raising football team.

== Honours ==
West Bromwich Albion

- Football League Second Division play-offs: 1993

Individual

- PFA Team of the Year: 1992–93 Second Division
