= Paul Mardon =

Wales international footballer

Personal information
- Full name: Paul Jonathan Mardon
- Date of birth: 14 September 1969 (age 57)
- Place of birth: Bristol, England
- Height: 6 ft 0 in (1.83 m)
- Position: Central defender

Youth career
- Bristol City

Senior career*
Years	Team	Apps	(Gls)
1987–1991	Bristol City	42	(0)
1990	→ Doncaster Rovers (loan)	3	(0)
1991–1993	Birmingham City	64	(1)
1993–2001	West Bromwich Albion	139	(3)
1999	→ Oldham Athletic (loan)	12	(3)
2000	→ Plymouth Argyle (loan)	3	(1)
2000	→ Wrexham (loan)	7	(0)
Total		270	(8)

International career
1995	Wales	1	(0)
- * Club domestic league appearances and goals

Paul Jonathan Mardon (born 14 September 1969) is a former professional footballer who made 270 appearances in the Football League playing as a central defender. He was capped once for the Wales national team, against Germany in October 1995.

== Career ==
Mardon was born in Bristol, and started his professional career in 1987 with hometown club Bristol City. He scored once for the club, at the age of 19, away to Nottingham Forest in the semi-final of the League Cup on 15 February 1989. He also played for Doncaster Rovers, Birmingham City, West Bromwich Albion, Oldham Athletic, Plymouth Argyle and Wrexham, before retiring due to injury in 2001.
