= Bob Taylor (footballer, born 1967) =

English footballer

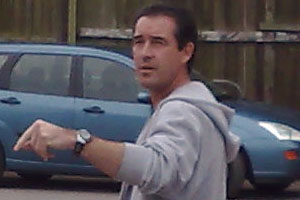
- Taylor in 2007

Personal information
- Full name: Robert Taylor
- Date of birth: 3 February 1967 (age 59)
- Place of birth: Easington, County Durham, England
- Height: 5 ft 10 in (1.78 m)
- Position: Striker

Youth career
- Horden Colliery Welfare

Senior career*
Years	Team	Apps	(Gls)
1986–1989	Leeds United	42	(9)
1989–1992	Bristol City	106	(50)
1992–1998	West Bromwich Albion	238	(96)
1998	→ Bolton Wanderers (loan)	4	(1)
1998	→ Bolton Wanderers (loan)	8	(2)
1998–2000	Bolton Wanderers	65	(18)
2000–2003	West Bromwich Albion	86	(17)
2003–2004	Cheltenham Town	28	(7)
2004–2006	Tamworth	60	(19)
2006–2007	Kidderminster Harriers	2	(0)
Total		639	(219)
- * Club domestic league appearances and goals

Robert Taylor (born 3 February 1967) is an English former footballer who played as a centre forward. Known by supporters as "Super Bobby Taylor", "Super Bob" or simply "Super", Taylor scored more than 250 goals in a professional career that comprised almost 750 games in 20 years. He is West Bromwich Albion's eighth highest goalscorer of all time.

He began his professional career at Leeds United, making his debut in 1986 at the age of 19. In 1989, he moved to Bristol City, before joining West Bromwich Albion in 1992. Taylor signed for Bolton Wanderers in 1998 following two successful loans spells at the club, but in 2000 returned to West Bromwich Albion, where he remained for a further three seasons. He then moved to Cheltenham Town before ending his career at non-league sides Tamworth and Kidderminster Harriers.

== Career ==
=== Early career ===
Taylor, the son of a miner, was born in Littlethorpe Hospital in Easington, and brought up in the small mining community of nearby Horden. He attended Dene House School in Peterlee, where he proved to be a useful cricketer. He was also a successful schoolboy footballer and captained his school team; he played initially at full-back, but later became a striker, the position he would go on to play for his entire professional career. Taylor had unsuccessful trials at both Hartlepool United and Newcastle United. At the age of 17 he joined his local non-league club, Horden Colliery Welfare. In March 1986, after only a few months there, Taylor turned professional by signing for Leeds United, at that time managed by Billy Bremner.

He gradually worked his way into the Leeds first team, making his professional debut against Millwall in the Second Division on 12 April 1986, and was part of the Leeds squad that lost the 1986–87 Division One playoff final, losing to Charlton Athletic in a replay, also reaching the FA Cup semi-finals that season. By the 1987–88 season he had become a regular in the side. However, when Howard Wilkinson succeeded Bremner as Leeds manager in 1988, the young centre-forward was no longer considered a regular player, as the new manager looked to make new signings to build a promotion-winning team. Taylor believed that this was because Wilkinson wanted immediate success, and needed to bring in established, experienced players in order to achieve this. Thus in March 1989 Taylor moved to Bristol City, with Carl Shutt moving to Leeds as part of the deal.

=== Bristol City ===
The signing of Taylor was an important one for Bristol City and its fans. Between 1980 and 1982 the club had three consecutive relegations, the first club ever to experience this feat. With Terry Cooper as manager the team regained some stability following promotion from the Fourth Division, but by 1989 the fans were frustrated after several years of austerity and a failure to make the next step into the Second Division. The signing of Taylor provided them with a long sought-after goal-scoring player.

Taylor made an instant impact at his new club, scoring eight goals in 12 games during the remainder of the season. His immediate importance earned him the deferential nickname of 'God' a significance that was noted by the club's influential fanzine The Bountyhunter. The front cover of its April 1989 issue conveying supporter sentiment by contrasting the signing of Taylor ('Hope') with the club's board members ('Hopeless').

In 1989–90, his first full season at City, he helped the club achieve promotion to Division Two. Taylor finished as Division Three leading goalscorer with 27 league goals (34 in total) and was also named Bristol City Player of the Year.

Although the following season proved to be less prolific for Taylor, it was nevertheless a major surprise when Bristol City agreed to sell Taylor to West Bromwich Albion – who were in the Third Division, while City were in the Second Division. Such was the backlash against manager Jimmy Lumsden following the sale that he was dismissed by the club shortly after, to be replaced by Denis Smith.

Taylor is one of six Bristol City strikers to be featured on a mural in the city; it was unveiled in 2024.

=== West Bromwich Albion ===
It was Albion manager Bobby Gould who brought him to The Hawthorns for a £300,000 fee in January 1992 to boost Albion's Third Division promotion challenge. Taylor was seen as a replacement for Don Goodman, who had been sold to Sunderland earlier in the season. Taylor scored on his debut against Brentford in a 2–0 Hawthorns win, and added another two on his away debut as Albion beat local rivals Birmingham City 3–0 at St Andrew's. Initially nicknamed "Trigger" (due to a perceived resemblance to the character in the television comedy Only Fools and Horses), Taylor soon became known as "Super Bob", a moniker he was first given by fans of Bristol City during his spell there, and scored eight times in 19 games during the second half of 1991–92, although Albion missed out on the playoffs. Gould then left the club and was replaced by Ossie Ardiles.

During the 1992–93 season, Taylor capitalised fully on the attacking football Albion played under new manager Ossie Ardiles, finishing as Division Two's top goalscorer with 30 league goals, and scoring 37 in all competitions. This was despite having a succession of different strike partners throughout the season, including Simon Garner, Luther Blissett, David Speedie and even midfielder Gary Robson. However, when Andy Hunt arrived at Albion in March 1993, he and Taylor quickly forged a successful striking partnership that would last for several seasons. Hunt and Taylor were part of the Baggies team that beat Port Vale at Wembley in the Division Two playoff final, to secure promotion to Division One. In the second half, with the game still goalless, Taylor was through on goal when he was brought down by former Leeds teammate Peter Swan. Swan's subsequent dismissal proved to be the turning point in the game, with Hunt scoring the first goal in a 3–0 victory.

Taylor was the club's top league goalscorer once again in 1993–94, scoring 18 goals. Albion however struggled in Division One and only avoided relegation on the last day of the season. Taylor scored several goals in local derbies during his time at Albion, including a diving header against Wolves to seal a 2–0 win in March 1995; he later described it as the best goal of his career. His only hat-trick for Albion, in a 4–4 draw against Watford on 12 March 1996, helped him to finish as Albion's top league goalscorer for the third time, finding the net on 17 occasions in 1995–96. He captained the side for the second half of that season and scored his 100th goal for the club in the final league game of the campaign, against Derby County. In early 1998, following the appointment of Denis Smith in place of Ray Harford as manager, Taylor was sent out on loan to Premiership club Bolton Wanderers.

=== Bolton Wanderers ===
Taylor made his Bolton debut on 10 January 1998 in a 0–0 draw with Southampton. He played four times for the club during his initial month-long spell on loan, scoring once. The goal came in the fourth and final game – against Manchester United at Old Trafford – as Taylor helped to earn Bolton a 1–1 draw. The goal against United instantly gave Taylor cult hero status amongst the Bolton faithful. He then returned to West Bromwich Albion, playing in a further nine games and scoring twice, before re-joining Bolton Wanderers for a second loan spell, this time for the remainder of the 1997–98 season. During this period he scored two goals in eight games for Bolton, who were relegated from the Premier League on goal difference.

When Albion were only prepared to offer him a one-year contract, Taylor moved to Bolton permanently in July 1998 for a £90,000 fee. He was the Wanderers' top scorer in the 1998–99 season, partnering Eiður Guðjohnsen as Bolton reached the First Division promotion play-offs. Taylor scored twice in the playoff semi-final second leg against Ipswich Town, to help earn his team a 4–4 draw on aggregate and qualification for the final via the away goals rule. Bolton just missed out on a return to the Premiership by losing 2–0 to Watford in the final at Wembley Stadium. However, when Sam Allardyce arrived as Bolton manager in 1999–2000, Taylor found his chances limited.

Aside from his affinity with Albion, he remains a favourite amongst the Bolton support, he returned to the Reebok for teammate and former roommate Jussi Jääskeläinen's testimonial in August 2009.

=== Second spell at Albion ===
With West Bromwich Albion struggling near the foot of Division One, manager Gary Megson signed Taylor in a £90,000 deal, making the striker one of four deadline-day signings by the club. Taylor's return to the Hawthorns paid off as he scored five goals in eight games, including one in a last day 2–0 victory over Charlton Athletic, to keep Albion in Division 1. His goal against former club Bolton – an overhead kick in a 4–4 draw – was voted as Albion's goal of the season for 1999–2000. The following season (2000–01) then saw Albion exceed all expectations, reaching the Division 1 playoffs, where they lost in the semi-final to Bolton.

"I've got my beloved Baggies to the promised land."

— Bob Taylor

Taylor became the 100th Albion player to be sent off in a first team match when he received a red card against Barnsley on 28 October 2001. After scoring vital goals in the final few games of the 2001–02 season against Nottingham Forest, Coventry and Rotherham, he helped seal Albion's promotion to the Premiership with the second goal in a final-day 2–0 win over Crystal Palace. Albion struggled in their first season in the Premiership however, with Taylor starting only one game. In March 2003, he expressed his unhappiness at his lack of first team action, saying that he was forced to train with the Albion youth team, and that he hadn't spoken to manager Gary Megson for four months. Albion were already relegated by the time Bob Taylor made his 377th and final appearance for them, in a 2–2 draw against Newcastle United on 11 May 2003. In what was only his second start of the season, Taylor was substituted due to injury after half an hour, but left the field to a standing ovation.

=== Later career and retirement ===
Bob Taylor's testimonial match was played at The Hawthorns on 13 May 2003, in front of 12,000 fans. It marked the end of his second and final spell at West Bromwich Albion, who had released him the day before. Taylor then spent a season at Cheltenham Town. He made his Cheltenham debut on 23 August 2003, coming on as a substitute in 3–3 draw away at Hull City. He marked his first start for Cheltenham with two goals in a 4–1 away win at Leyton Orient a week later. He then joined Tamworth in 2004. A highlight of his time at the latter club was a 10-minute 2nd-half hat-trick in a 3–2 win at Leigh RMI on 6 November 2004. In 2005 Taylor signed for Tamworth for a further 12 months. During 2005–06, Taylor received a conviction for drink-driving; Tamworth gave him two weeks leave "to deal with personal matters". Following his release from Tamworth in May 2006, Taylor linked up with Kidderminster Harriers for pre-season training and signed a non-contract deal with the club in September 2006. He left Kidderminster in January 2007 having made three appearances as a substitute. He subsequently retired from professional football, playing for Turnpike FC in Lichfield Pub League, and has since set up his own promotions company, Super Bob Events.

== Style of play ==
Bob Taylor was primarily a goal poacher. His goals were often unspectacular, and he lacked the pace necessary to chase long balls. Instead he relied heavily on his sense of timing; of being in the right place at the right time. He was also adept at holding the ball up to bring other players into the game. Taylor was "all effort" and did not shy away from the physical side of football. He has been described by West Bromwich Albion club historian Tony Matthews as "Strong and powerful both on the ground and in the air and a perpetual hard worker".

== Career statistics ==
Appearances and goals by club, season and competition
Club	Season	League		FA Cup		League Cup		Other (Note: Includes Full Members Cup, Football League play-offs, Anglo-Italian Cup, Football League Trophy and FA Trophy. Friendlies and testimonials not included.)		Total	
Club	Season	App	Goals	App	Goals	App	Goals	App	Goals	App	Goals
Leeds United	1985–86	2	0	0	0	0	0	0	0	2	0
Leeds United	1986–87	2	0	0	0	2	1	2	0	6	1
Leeds United	1987–88	32	9	1	0	4	2	2	1	39	12
Leeds United	1988–89	6	0	0	0	0	0	1	0	7	0
Leeds United	Total	42	9	1	0	6	3	5	1	54	13
Bristol City	1988–89	12	8	0	0	0	0	0	0	12	8
Bristol City	1989–90	37	27	7	5	2	2	1	0	47	34
Bristol City	1990–91	39	11	1	0	4	0	1	0	45	11
Bristol City	1991–92	18	4	2	0	1	0	1	1	22	5
Bristol City	Total	106	50	10	5	7	2	3	1	126	58
West Bromwich Albion	1991–92	19	8	0	0	0	0	0	0	19	8
West Bromwich Albion	1992–93	46	30	4	3	2	1	7	3	59	37
West Bromwich Albion	1993–94	42	18	1	0	4	1	5	2	52	21
West Bromwich Albion	1994–95	42	11	1	0	1	0	0	0	44	11
West Bromwich Albion	1995–96	42	17	1	0	4	3	7	3	54	23
West Bromwich Albion	1996–97	32	10	1	0	2	0	0	0	35	10
West Bromwich Albion	1997–98	15	2	0	0	3	1	0	0	18	3
West Bromwich Albion	Total	238	96	8	3	16	6	19	8	281	113
Bolton Wanderers	1997–98	12	3	0	0	0	0	0	0	12	3
Bolton Wanderers	1998–99	38	15	1	0	6	1	3	2	48	18
Bolton Wanderers	1999–00	27	3	4	2	5	1	0	0	36	6
Bolton Wanderers	Total	77	21	5	2	11	2	3	2	96	27
West Bromwich Albion	1999–00	8	5	0	0	0	0	0	0	8	5
West Bromwich Albion	2000–01	40	5	1	1	3	0	2	0	46	6
West Bromwich Albion	2001–02	34	7	1	0	3	0	0	0	38	7
West Bromwich Albion	2002–03	4	0	0	0	0	0	0	0	4	0
West Bromwich Albion	Total	86	17	2	1	6	0	2	0	96	18
Cheltenham Town	2003–04	28	7	2	1	0	0	1	0	31	8
Tamworth	2004–05	35	19	1	0	0	0	1	0	37	19
Tamworth	2005–06	25	0	0	0	0	0	0	0	25	0
Tamworth	Total	60	19	1	0	0	0	1	0	62	19
Kidderminster Harriers	2006–07	2	0	1	0	0	0	0	0	3	0
Total		639	219	30	12	46	13	34	12	749	256

== Honours ==
Bristol City

- Football League Third Division runner-up: 1989–90

West Bromwich Albion

- Football League Second Division play-offs: 1993
- Football League First Division runner-up: 2001–02

Individual

- PFA Team of the Year: 1992–93 Second Division
- Football League Third Division Golden Boot: 1989–90
- Football League Second Division Golden Boot: 1992–93
