= 1993–94 Football League =

95th season of the Football League

The Football League
- Season: 1993–94
- Champions: Crystal Palace
- Promoted: Crystal Palace; Nottingham Forest; Leicester City
- New club in the league: Wycombe Wanderers

The 1993–94 Football League season was the 95th completed season of The Football League. From 1993 to 1996 the league was sponsored by Endsleigh.

Alan Smith kicked off his management career by guiding Crystal Palace to the Division One title and back to the Premier League at the first time of asking. Nottingham Forest, now managed by Frank Clark following Brian Clough's retirement, also made a swift return to the Premier League by finishing runners-up to Palace. They were joined by play-off winners Leicester City, who finally reached the top flight after two successive play-off final defeats.

Oxford United's decline since losing their top-flight status in 1988 continued as they slid into Division Two, along with Peterborough United and Birmingham City.

Mark McGhee won the Division Two title for Reading, with John Rudge's Port Vale taking the other automatic promotion place. Burnley triumphed in the play-offs, thus moving to within one division of the top flight just seven years after they had almost been relegated to the Conference. Fulham, Hartlepool United, Exeter City and Barnet were the teams relegated to Division Three.

Shrewsbury Town, Chester City and Crewe Alexandra claimed the three automatic promotion places in Division Three, while Martin O'Neill's Wycombe Wanderers won the play-offs in their first season of league football. Northampton Town finished bottom of the league, but were saved from demotion as Conference champions Kidderminster Harriers did not meet the league's stadium capacity requirements.

== Final league tables and results ==
The tables and results below are reproduced here in the exact form that they can be found at The Rec.Sport.Soccer Statistics Foundation website, with home and away statistics separated. Play-off results are from the same website.

== First Division ==
First Division
- Season: 1993–94
- Champions: Crystal Palace
- Promoted: Crystal Palace; Nottingham Forest; Leicester City
- Relegated: Birmingham City; Oxford United; Peterborough United
- Matches: 552
- Goals: 1,450 (2.63 per match)
- Top goalscorer: John McGinlay (25 goals)

Following relegation from the Premier League at the end of the 1992–93 season, Crystal Palace earned an immediate return to the top flight by finishing champions of Division One with 90 points in their first season under manager Alan Smith. Their nearest rivals, Nottingham Forest, newly relegated and also with a new manager in Frank Clark, finished runners-up on 83 points.

After losing in the previous two playoff finals and on all of their six previous visits to Wembley, Leicester City finally won a Wembley final at the seventh attempt by beating local rivals Derby County in the Division One playoff final to end their seven-year absence from the top flight. Leicester's semi-final opponents Tranmere lost at this stage of the playoffs for a second successive season, also suffering defeat in the League Cup semi-finals. Third placed Millwall were defeated by Derby in the other semi-finals.

Four months after resigning as England manager, Graham Taylor succeeded long-serving Graham Turner as manager of a Wolves side who just fell short of the playoffs. Middlesbrough, another side who missed out on the playoffs, prepared for a promotion push in 1994–95 by appointing former Manchester United and England captain Bryan Robson as player-manager following the resignation of Lennie Lawrence at the end of the season.

At the other end of the table, Peterborough United's second season in Division One ended in relegation when they finished bottom of the table. Oxford United, who lost manager Brian Horton to Manchester City a few games into the season, were unable to avoid relegation under new manager Denis Smith, while the last relegation place went to Birmingham City, who were edged into the bottom three by local rivals West Bromwich Albion.

Pos	Team	Pld	W	D	L	GF	GA	GD	Pts	Qualification or relegation
1	Crystal Palace (C, P)	46	27	9	10	73	46	+27	90	Promotion to the Premier League
2	Nottingham Forest (P)	46	23	14	9	74	49	+25	83	Promotion to the Premier League
3	Millwall	46	19	17	10	58	49	+9	74	Qualification for the First Division play-offs
4	Leicester City (O, P)	46	19	16	11	72	59	+13	73	Qualification for the First Division play-offs
5	Tranmere Rovers	46	21	9	16	69	53	+16	72	Qualification for the First Division play-offs
6	Derby County	46	20	11	15	73	68	+5	71	Qualification for the First Division play-offs
7	Notts County	46	20	8	18	65	69	−4	68	
8	Wolverhampton Wanderers	46	17	17	12	60	47	+13	68	
9	Middlesbrough	46	18	13	15	66	54	+12	67	
10	Stoke City	46	18	13	15	57	59	−2	67	
11	Charlton Athletic	46	19	8	19	61	58	+3	65	
12	Sunderland	46	19	8	19	54	57	−3	65	
13	Bristol City	46	16	16	14	47	50	−3	64	
14	Bolton Wanderers	46	15	14	17	63	64	−1	59	
15	Southend United	46	17	8	21	63	67	−4	59	
16	Grimsby Town	46	13	20	13	52	47	+5	59	
17	Portsmouth	46	15	13	18	52	58	−6	58	
18	Barnsley	46	16	7	23	55	67	−12	55	
19	Watford	46	15	9	22	66	80	−14	54	
20	Luton Town	46	14	11	21	56	60	−4	53	
21	West Bromwich Albion	46	13	12	21	60	69	−9	51	
22	Birmingham City (R)	46	13	12	21	52	69	−17	51	Relegation to the Second Division
23	Oxford United (R)	46	13	10	23	54	75	−21	49	Relegation to the Second Division
24	Peterborough United (R)	46	8	13	25	48	76	−28	37	Relegation to the Second Division

Source: rsssf.com
Rules for classification: 1) Points; 2) Goals scored; 3) Goal difference
(C) Champions; (O) Play-off winners; (P) Promoted; (R) Relegated

=== Play-offs ===
Semi-finals; 1st leg – 15 May; 2nd leg – 18 May 1994
3rd	Millwall	0	1	1
6th	Derby County	2	3	5
4th	Leicester City	0	2	2
5th	Tranmere Rovers	0	1	1

Final at Wembley; 30 May 1994
4th	Leicester City	2
6th	Derby County	1

=== Results ===
Home \ Away	BAR	BIR	BOL	BRI	CHA	CRY	DER	GRI	LEI	LUT	MID	MIL	NOT	NTC	OXF	PET	POR	STD	STK	SUN	TRA	WAT	WBA	WOL
Barnsley		2–3	1–1	1–1	0–1	1–3	0–1	1–2	0–1	1–0	1–4	0–1	1–0	0–3	1–0	1–0	2–0	1–3	3–0	4–0	1–0	0–1	1–1	2–0
Birmingham City	0–2		2–1	2–2	1–0	2–4	3–0	1–1	0–3	1–1	1–0	1–0	0–3	2–3	1–1	0–0	0–1	3–1	3–1	0–0	0–3	1–0	2–0	2–2
Bolton Wanderers	2–3	1–1		2–2	3–2	1–0	0–2	1–1	1–2	2–1	4–1	4–0	4–3	4–2	1–0	1–1	1–1	0–2	1–1	0–0	2–1	3–1	1–1	1–3
Bristol City	0–2	3–0	2–0		0–0	2–0	0–0	1–0	1–3	1–0	0–0	2–2	1–4	0–2	0–1	4–1	1–0	2–1	0–0	2–0	2–0	1–1	0–0	2–1
Charlton Athletic	2–1	1–0	3–0	3–1		0–0	1–2	0–1	2–1	1–0	2–5	0–0	0–1	5–1	1–0	5–1	0–1	4–3	2–0	0–0	3–1	2–1	2–1	0–1
Crystal Palace	1–0	2–1	1–1	4–1	2–0		1–1	1–0	2–1	3–2	0–1	1–0	2–0	1–2	2–1	3–2	5–1	1–0	4–1	1–0	0–0	0–2	1–0	1–1
Derby County	2–0	1–1	2–0	1–0	2–0	3–1		2–1	3–2	2–1	0–1	0–0	0–2	1–1	2–1	2–0	1–0	1–3	4–2	5–0	4–0	1–2	5–3	0–4
Grimsby Town	2–2	1–0	0–0	1–0	0–1	1–1	1–1		0–0	2–0	1–1	0–0	0–0	2–2	1–0	3–2	1–1	4–0	0–0	0–1	0–0	2–2	2–2	2–0
Leicester City	0–1	1–1	1–1	3–0	2–1	1–1	3–3	1–1		2–1	2–0	4–0	1–0	3–2	2–3	2–1	0–3	3–0	1–1	2–1	1–1	4–4	4–2	2–2
Luton Town	5–0	1–1	0–2	0–2	1–0	0–1	2–1	2–1	0–2		1–1	1–1	1–2	1–0	3–0	2–0	4–1	1–1	6–2	2–1	0–1	2–1	3–2	0–2
Middlesbrough	5–0	2–2	0–1	0–1	2–0	2–3	3–0	1–0	2–0	0–0		4–2	2–2	3–0	2–1	1–1	0–2	1–0	1–2	4–1	0–0	1–1	3–0	1–0
Millwall	2–0	2–1	1–0	0–0	2–1	3–0	0–0	1–0	0–0	2–2	1–1		2–2	2–0	2–2	1–0	0–0	1–4	2–0	2–1	3–1	4–1	2–1	1–0
Nottingham Forest	2–1	1–0	3–2	0–0	1–1	1–1	1–1	5–3	4–0	2–0	1–1	1–3		1–0	0–0	2–0	1–1	2–0	2–3	2–2	2–1	2–1	2–1	0–0
Notts County	3–1	2–1	2–1	2–0	3–3	3–2	4–1	2–1	4–1	1–2	2–3	1–3	2–1		2–1	2–1	1–1	2–1	2–0	1–0	0–0	1–0	1–0	0–2
Oxford United	1–1	2–0	0–2	4–2	0–4	1–3	2–0	2–2	2–2	0–1	1–1	0–2	1–0	2–1		1–2	3–2	2–1	1–0	0–3	1–0	2–3	1–1	4–0
Peterborough United	4–1	1–0	2–3	0–2	0–1	1–1	2–2	1–2	1–1	0–0	1–0	0–0	2–3	1–1	3–1		2–2	3–1	1–1	1–3	0–0	3–4	2–0	0–1
Portsmouth	2–1	0–2	0–0	0–0	1–2	0–1	3–2	3–1	0–1	1–0	2–0	2–2	2–1	0–0	1–1	0–2		2–1	3–3	0–1	2–0	2–0	0–1	3–0
Southend United	0–3	3–1	0–2	0–1	4–2	1–2	4–3	1–2	0–0	2–1	1–0	1–1	1–1	1–0	6–1	3–0	2–1		0–0	0–1	1–2	2–0	0–3	1–1
Stoke City	5–4	2–1	2–0	3–0	1–0	0–2	2–1	1–0	1–0	2–2	3–1	1–2	0–1	0–0	1–1	3–0	2–0	0–1		1–0	1–2	2–0	1–0	1–1
Sunderland	1–0	1–0	2–0	0–0	4–0	1–0	1–0	2–2	2–3	2–0	2–1	2–1	2–3	2–0	2–3	2–0	1–2	0–2	0–1		3–2	2–0	1–0	0–2
Tranmere Rovers	0–3	1–2	2–1	2–2	2–0	0–1	4–0	1–2	1–0	4–1	4–0	3–2	1–2	3–1	2–0	2–1	3–1	1–1	2–0	4–1		2–1	3–0	1–1
Watford	0–2	5–2	4–3	1–1	2–2	1–3	3–4	0–3	1–1	2–2	2–0	2–0	1–2	3–1	2–1	2–1	1–0	3–0	1–3	1–1	1–2		0–1	1–0
West Bromwich Albion	1–1	2–4	2–2	0–1	2–0	1–4	1–2	1–0	1–2	1–1	1–1	0–0	0–2	3–0	3–1	3–0	4–1	2–2	0–0	2–1	1–3	4–1		3–2
Wolverhampton Wanderers	1–1	3–0	1–0	3–1	1–1	2–0	2–2	0–0	1–1	1–0	2–3	2–0	1–1	3–0	2–1	1–1	1–1	0–1	1–1	1–1	2–1	2–0	1–2	

Legend: Blue = home team win; Yellow = draw; Red = away team win.

=== Locations ===
Locations of the London-based First Division teams
Locations of the First Division teams

=== Attendances ===
#	Club	Average
1	Nottingham Forest	23,051
2	Wolverhampton Wanderers	22,008
3	Sunderland	16,934
4	West Bromwich Albion	16,840
5	Leicester City	16,009
6	Derby County	15,937
7	Stoke City	15,931
8	Crystal Palace	15,365
9	Birmingham City	14,506
10	Portsmouth	11,692
11	Bolton Wanderers	10,498
12	Middlesbrough	10,400
13	Millwall	9,821
14	Bristol City	8,852
15	Notts County	8,314
16	Tranmere Rovers	8,099
17	Charlton Athletic	8,056
18	Watford	7,907
19	Luton Town	7,878
20	Barnsley	7,610
21	Peterborough United	7,412
22	Oxford United	6,877
23	Southend United	6,105
24	Grimsby Town	6,075

== Second Division ==
In a tight promotion race contested between the sides who finished in Division Two's top four places, Reading won the title and clinched promotion in their third season under the management of Mark McGhee, with veteran striker Jimmy Quinn being the highest scorer in all four divisions with 35 goals. Port Vale, the previous season's losing playoff finalists, went up as runners-up - their third promotion under the management of long-serving John Rudge. Plymouth Argyle and Stockport County missed out on automatic promotion and had to contest the playoffs with York City and Burnley. The semi-final between Burnley and Plymouth Argyle saw the Turf Moor side emerge as victors, while York City squandered their chances of a second successive promotion (and second-tier football for the first time since the mid-1970s) by losing to Stockport County in the other semi-final. Burnley won the Wembley final 2–1, ending their 11-year spell in the lower two divisions of the league and consigning Stockport to a fourth Wembley defeat in three seasons.

At the other end of the table, Barnet's first season in the third tier ended in relegation with a bottom place finish. Hartlepool United went down after three seasons. Exeter City had lost manager Alan Ball to Southampton halfway through the season and appointed Terry Cooper, manager of their 1990 promotion winning side, as Ball's successor, but were unable to avoid relegation. The final relegation place went to Fulham, who dropped into the fourth tier for the first time in their history. Blackpool, another fallen giant, managed to avoid relegation but survival was not enough for chairman Owen Oyston, who dismissed manager Billy Ayre after four seasons in charge and replaced him with Sam Allardyce.

Football LeagueSecond Division
- Season: 1993–94
- Champions: Reading (2nd third tier title)
- Direct promotion: Reading; Port Vale
- Promoted through play-offs: Burnley
- Relegated: Barnet; Exeter City; Fulham; Hartlepool United
- Matches: 552
- Goals: 1,508 (2.73 per match)
- Top goalscorer: Jimmy Quinn (Reading), 35

Pos	Team	Pld	W	D	L	GF	GA	GD	Pts	Promotion or relegation
1	Reading (C, P)	46	26	11	9	81	44	+37	89	Promotion to the First Division
2	Port Vale (P)	46	26	10	10	79	46	+33	88	Promotion to the First Division
3	Plymouth Argyle	46	25	10	11	88	56	+32	85	Qualification for the Second Division play-offs
4	Stockport County	46	24	13	9	74	44	+30	85	Qualification for the Second Division play-offs
5	York City	46	21	12	13	64	40	+24	75	Qualification for the Second Division play-offs
6	Burnley (O, P)	46	21	10	15	79	58	+21	73	Qualification for the Second Division play-offs
7	Bradford City	46	19	13	14	61	53	+8	70	
8	Bristol Rovers	46	20	10	16	60	59	+1	70	
9	Hull City	46	18	14	14	62	54	+8	68	
10	Cambridge United	46	19	9	18	79	73	+6	66	
11	Huddersfield Town	46	17	14	15	58	61	−3	65	
12	Wrexham	46	17	11	18	66	77	−11	62	
13	Swansea City	46	16	12	18	56	58	−2	60	
14	Brighton & Hove Albion	46	15	14	17	60	67	−7	59	
15	Rotherham United	46	15	13	18	63	60	+3	58	
16	Brentford	46	13	19	14	57	55	+2	58	
17	Bournemouth	46	14	15	17	51	59	−8	57	
18	Leyton Orient	46	14	14	18	57	71	−14	56	
19	Cardiff City	46	13	15	18	66	79	−13	54	
20	Blackpool	46	16	5	25	63	75	−12	53	
21	Fulham (R)	46	14	10	22	50	63	−13	52	Relegation to the Third Division
22	Exeter City (R)	46	11	12	23	52	83	−31	45	Relegation to the Third Division
23	Hartlepool United (R)	46	9	9	28	41	87	−46	36	Relegation to the Third Division
24	Barnet (R)	46	5	13	28	41	86	−45	28	Relegation to the Third Division

(C) Champions; (O) Play-off winners; (P) Promoted; (R) Relegated

=== Play-offs ===
Semi-finals; 1st leg – 15 May; 2nd leg – 18 May 1994
3rd	Plymouth Argyle	0	1	1
6th	Burnley	0	3	3
4th	Stockport County	0	1	1
5th	York City	0	0	0

Final at Wembley; 29 May 1994
4th	Stockport County	1
6th	Burnley	2

=== Results ===
Home \ Away	BAR	BLP	BOU	BRA	BRE	B&HA	BRR	BUR	CAM	CAR	EXE	FUL	HAR	HUD	HUL	LEY	PLY	PTV	REA	ROT	STP	SWA	WRE	YOR
Barnet		0–1	1–2	1–2	0–0	1–1	1–2	1–1	2–3	0–0	2–1	0–2	3–2	0–1	1–2	3–1	0–0	2–3	0–1	2–1	0–0	0–1	1–2	1–3
Blackpool	3–1		2–1	1–3	1–1	2–0	0–1	1–2	2–3	1–0	1–0	2–3	2–1	2–1	6–2	4–1	2–1	1–3	0–4	1–2	2–0	1–1	4–1	0–5
Bournemouth	1–1	1–0		1–1	0–3	2–1	3–0	1–0	1–2	3–2	1–1	1–3	0–0	1–2	0–2	1–1	0–1	2–1	2–1	0–0	1–1	0–1	1–2	3–1
Bradford City	2–1	2–1	0–0		1–0	2–0	0–1	0–1	2–0	2–0	6–0	0–0	2–1	3–0	1–1	0–0	1–5	2–1	2–4	2–1	1–2	2–1	1–0	0–0
Brentford	1–0	3–0	1–1	2–0		1–1	3–4	0–0	3–3	1–1	2–1	1–2	1–0	1–2	0–3	0–1	1–1	1–2	1–0	2–2	1–1	1–1	2–1	1–1
Brighton & Hove Albion	1–0	3–2	3–3	0–1	2–1		0–2	1–1	4–1	3–5	0–0	2–0	1–1	2–2	3–0	2–0	2–1	1–3	0–1	0–2	1–1	4–1	1–1	2–0
Bristol Rovers	5–2	1–0	0–1	4–3	1–4	1–0		3–1	2–1	2–1	1–1	2–1	1–1	0–0	1–1	1–1	0–0	2–0	1–1	0–2	1–1	1–2	3–1	0–1
Burnley	5–0	3–1	4–0	0–1	4–1	3–0	3–1		3–0	2–0	3–2	3–1	2–0	1–1	3–1	4–1	4–2	2–1	0–1	0–0	1–1	1–1	2–1	2–1
Cambridge United	1–1	3–2	3–2	2–1	1–1	2–1	1–3	0–1		1–1	3–0	3–0	1–0	4–5	3–4	3–1	2–0	1–0	0–1	0–1	0–0	2–0	2–2	0–2
Cardiff City	0–0	0–2	2–1	1–1	1–1	2–2	1–2	2–1	2–7		2–0	1–0	2–2	2–2	3–4	2–0	2–3	1–3	3–0	1–0	3–1	1–0	5–1	0–0
Exeter City	0–0	1–0	0–2	0–0	2–2	1–1	1–0	4–1	0–5	2–2		6–4	2–1	2–3	0–1	1–0	2–3	1–1	4–6	1–1	1–2	1–0	5–0	1–2
Fulham	3–0	1–0	0–2	1–1	0–0	0–1	0–1	3–2	0–2	1–3	0–2		2–0	1–1	0–1	2–3	1–1	0–0	1–0	1–0	0–1	3–1	0–0	0–1
Hartlepool United	2–1	2–0	1–1	1–2	0–1	2–2	2–1	4–1	0–2	3–0	1–2	0–1		1–4	0–1	1–1	1–8	1–4	1–4	2–0	1–0	1–0	1–2	0–2
Huddersfield Town	1–2	2–1	1–1	1–1	1–3	1–3	1–0	1–1	1–1	2–0	0–1	1–0	1–1		0–2	1–0	1–0	1–1	0–3	2–1	1–1	1–1	3–0	3–2
Hull City	4–4	0–0	1–1	3–1	1–0	0–0	3–0	1–2	2–0	1–0	5–1	1–1	1–0	2–1		0–1	2–2	0–0	1–2	4–1	0–1	0–1	0–0	1–1
Leyton Orient	4–2	2–0	0–0	2–1	1–1	1–3	1–0	3–1	2–1	2–2	1–1	2–2	1–2	1–0	3–1		2–1	2–3	1–1	1–1	0–0	2–1	2–2	2–0
Plymouth Argyle	1–0	2–1	2–0	3–1	1–1	1–1	3–3	3–2	0–3	1–2	1–0	3–1	2–0	2–0	2–1	3–1		2–0	3–1	4–2	2–3	2–1	1–1	2–1
Port Vale	6–0	2–0	2–1	0–0	1–0	4–0	2–0	1–1	2–2	2–2	3–0	2–2	1–0	1–0	2–1	2–1	2–1		0–4	2–1	1–1	3–0	3–0	2–1
Reading	4–1	1–1	3–0	1–1	2–1	2–0	2–0	2–1	3–1	1–1	1–0	1–0	4–0	0–0	1–1	2–1	3–2	1–2		0–0	2–0	2–1	0–1	2–1
Rotherham United	1–1	0–2	1–2	2–1	2–0	0–1	1–1	3–2	3–0	5–2	3–0	1–2	7–0	2–3	1–0	2–1	0–3	0–2	2–2		1–2	1–1	2–1	2–1
Stockport County	2–1	1–0	0–2	4–1	3–1	3–0	0–2	2–1	3–1	2–2	4–0	2–4	5–0	3–0	0–0	3–0	2–3	2–1	1–1	2–0		4–0	1–0	1–2
Swansea City	2–0	4–4	1–1	2–0	1–1	3–0	2–0	3–1	4–2	1–0	2–0	2–1	1–1	1–0	1–0	1–1	0–1	0–1	1–1	0–0	1–2		3–1	1–2
Wrexham	4–0	2–3	2–1	0–3	1–2	1–3	3–2	1–0	1–1	3–1	1–1	2–0	2–0	3–1	3–0	4–2	0–3	2–1	3–2	3–3	0–1	3–2		1–1
York City	1–1	2–1	2–0	1–1	0–2	3–1	0–1	0–0	2–0	5–0	3–0	2–0	3–0	0–2	0–0	3–0	0–0	1–0	1–0	0–0	1–2	2–1	1–1	

Legend: Blue = home team win; Yellow = draw; Red = away team win.

=== Locations ===
Locations of the Second Division teams
Locations of the London-based Second Division teams

== Third Division ==
Shrewsbury Town's two-year spell back in the league's bottom tier ended in Division Three title glory and promotion under new manager Fred Davies, while Chester City earned an instant return to Division Two as runners-up of Division Three, only their third promotion in more than 60 years as a Football League side. The final automatic promotion place went to Crewe Alexandra, who had been beaten in the playoffs during the previous two seasons following their relegation in 1991. The final promotion place went to playoff winners Wycombe Wanderers, who triumphed 4–2 over Preston North End in the Wembley final at the end of their first season as a Football League side. Torquay United and Carlisle United were the losing semi-finalists in the playoffs, reflecting major progress as the two sides had battled against relegation to the Conference one season earlier.

There was no relegation from the Football League this season - for the first time since automatic relegation and promotion between the league's basement division and the Football Conference was introduced in 1987. This was due to stadium requirements introduced by the Football League for potential Conference champions, emerging from the stadium crisis and ensuing financial problems which had helped bring about the collapse of Maidstone United just three years after gaining league status by this route. Kidderminster Harriers, the Conference champions, did not meet the league requirements and were denied a place in Division Three for the 1994–95 season, which saved the league's bottom placed club Northampton Town from being relegated into non-league football.

Football LeagueThird Division
- Season: 1993–94
- Champions: Shrewsbury Town (1st fourth tier title)
- Direct promotion: Shrewsbury Town; Chester City; Crewe Alexandra
- Promoted through play-offs: Wycombe Wanderers
- Relegated to Conference: None
- New club in the league: Wycombe Wanderers
- Matches: 462
- Goals: 1,265 (2.74 per match)
- Top goalscorer: Tony Ellis (Preston North End), 26

Pos	Team	Pld	W	D	L	GF	GA	GD	Pts	Promotion or relegation
1	Shrewsbury Town (C, P)	42	22	13	7	63	39	+24	79	Promotion to the Second Division
2	Chester City (P)	42	21	11	10	69	46	+23	74	Promotion to the Second Division
3	Crewe Alexandra (P)	42	21	10	11	80	61	+19	73	Promotion to the Second Division
4	Wycombe Wanderers (O, P)	42	19	13	10	67	53	+14	70	Qualification for the Third Division play-offs
5	Preston North End	42	18	13	11	79	60	+19	67	Qualification for the Third Division play-offs
6	Torquay United	42	17	16	9	64	56	+8	67	Qualification for the Third Division play-offs
7	Carlisle United	42	18	10	14	57	42	+15	64	Qualification for the Third Division play-offs
8	Chesterfield	42	16	14	12	55	48	+7	62	
9	Rochdale	42	16	12	14	63	51	+12	60	
10	Walsall	42	17	9	16	48	53	−5	60	
11	Scunthorpe United	42	15	14	13	64	56	+8	59	
12	Mansfield Town	42	15	10	17	53	62	−9	55	
13	Bury	42	14	11	17	55	56	−1	53	
14	Scarborough	42	15	8	19	55	61	−6	53	
15	Doncaster Rovers	42	14	10	18	44	57	−13	52	
16	Gillingham	42	12	15	15	44	51	−7	51	
17	Colchester United	42	13	10	19	56	71	−15	49	
18	Lincoln City	42	12	11	19	52	63	−11	47	
19	Wigan Athletic	42	11	12	19	51	70	−19	45	
20	Hereford United	42	12	6	24	60	79	−19	42	
21	Darlington	42	10	11	21	42	64	−22	41	
22	Northampton Town	42	9	11	22	44	66	−22	38	Reprieved from relegation

(C) Champions; (O) Play-off winners; (P) Promoted

=== Play-offs ===
Semi-finals; 1st leg – 15 May; 2nd leg – 18 May 1994
4th	Wycombe Wanderers	2	2	4
7th	Carlisle United	0	1	1
5th	Preston North End	0	4	4
6th	Torquay United	2	1	3

Final at Wembley; 28 May 1994
4th	Wycombe Wanderers	4
5th	Preston North End	2

=== Results ===
Home \ Away	BRY	CRL	CHR	CHF	COL	CRE	DAR	DON	GIL	HER	LIN	MAN	NOR	PNE	ROC	SCA	SCU	SHR	TOR	WAL	WIG	WYC
Bury		2–1	1–1	2–1	0–1	1–0	5–1	4–0	0–0	5–3	1–0	2–2	0–0	1–1	0–1	0–2	1–0	2–3	1–1	1–2	3–0	1–2
Carlisle United	1–2		1–0	3–0	2–0	1–2	2–0	4–2	1–2	1–2	3–3	1–1	0–1	0–1	0–1	2–0	3–1	2–1	1–1	2–1	3–0	2–2
Chester City	3–0	0–0		3–1	2–1	1–2	0–0	0–1	1–0	3–1	1–1	1–1	1–0	3–2	3–1	4–1	0–2	1–0	1–1	2–1	2–1	3–1
Chesterfield	1–1	3–0	1–2		0–0	2–0	1–1	1–1	3–2	3–1	2–2	0–2	4–0	1–1	1–1	1–0	1–1	1–2	3–1	0–1	1–0	2–3
Colchester United	4–1	2–1	0–0	0–2		2–4	1–2	3–1	1–2	1–0	1–0	0–0	3–2	1–1	2–5	1–2	2–1	3–3	1–2	0–1	3–1	0–2
Crewe Alexandra	2–4	2–3	2–1	0–1	2–1		2–1	2–0	1–0	6–0	2–2	2–1	3–1	4–3	2–1	1–1	3–3	0–0	2–3	1–2	4–1	2–1
Darlington	1–0	1–3	1–2	0–0	7–3	1–0		1–3	2–1	1–3	3–2	2–0	0–1	0–2	1–1	0–2	2–1	0–2	1–2	0–0	0–0	0–0
Doncaster Rovers	1–3	0–0	3–4	0–0	2–1	0–0	1–3		0–0	1–0	1–0	0–1	2–1	1–1	2–1	0–4	3–1	0–0	0–2	4–0	3–1	0–3
Gillingham	1–0	2–0	2–2	0–2	3–0	1–3	2–1	0–0		2–0	1–1	1–0	1–0	2–2	1–2	2–2	1–0	0–2	2–2	1–1	2–2	0–1
Hereford United	3–0	0–0	0–5	0–3	5–0	1–2	1–1	2–1	2–0		1–2	2–3	1–1	2–3	5–1	0–1	1–2	0–1	2–2	0–1	3–0	3–4
Lincoln City	2–2	0–0	0–3	1–2	2–0	1–2	1–1	2–1	3–1	3–1		1–2	4–3	0–2	1–1	0–1	2–0	0–1	1–0	1–2	0–1	1–3
Mansfield Town	2–2	0–1	0–4	1–2	1–1	1–2	0–3	2–1	2–1	2–1	1–0		1–0	2–2	0–1	4–2	0–1	1–0	2–1	1–2	2–3	3–0
Northampton Town	0–1	1–1	1–0	2–2	1–1	2–2	1–0	0–0	1–2	0–1	0–0	5–1		2–0	1–2	3–2	4–0	0–3	0–1	0–1	0–2	1–1
Preston North End	3–1	0–3	1–1	4–1	1–0	0–2	3–2	3–1	0–0	3–0	2–0	3–1	1–1		2–1	2–2	2–2	6–1	3–1	2–0	3–0	2–3
Rochdale	2–1	0–1	2–0	5–1	1–1	2–1	0–0	0–1	3–0	2–0	0–1	1–1	6–2	2–1		2–1	2–3	1–2	4–1	0–0	1–2	2–2
Scarborough	1–0	0–3	0–1	1–1	0–2	1–2	3–0	2–0	1–1	0–1	2–2	1–1	2–1	3–4	2–1		0–1	1–3	1–2	1–0	4–1	3–1
Scunthorpe United	1–1	2–1	1–1	2–2	1–1	2–1	3–0	1–3	1–1	1–2	2–0	2–3	7–0	3–1	2–1	1–1		1–4	1–3	5–0	1–0	0–0
Shrewsbury Town	1–0	1–0	3–0	0–0	2–1	2–2	1–1	0–1	2–2	2–0	1–2	2–2	2–1	1–0	1–1	2–0	0–0		3–2	1–2	0–0	1–0
Torquay United	0–0	1–1	1–3	1–0	3–3	3–3	2–1	2–1	0–1	1–1	3–2	1–0	2–0	4–3	1–1	2–0	1–1	0–0		0–1	1–1	1–1
Walsall	0–1	0–1	1–1	0–1	1–2	2–2	3–0	1–2	1–0	3–3	5–2	0–2	1–3	2–0	1–0	1–0	0–0	0–1	1–2		1–1	4–2
Wigan Athletic	3–1	0–2	6–3	1–0	0–1	2–2	2–0	0–0	2–0	3–4	0–1	4–1	1–1	2–2	0–0	1–2	0–2	2–5	1–3	2–2		1–1
Wycombe Wanderers	2–1	2–0	1–0	0–1	2–5	3–1	2–0	1–0	1–1	3–2	2–3	1–0	1–0	1–1	1–1	4–0	2–2	1–1	1–1	3–0	0–1	

Legend: Blue = home team win; Yellow = draw; Red = away team win.

=== Locations ===
Locations of the Third Division teams

== See also ==
- 1993–94 in English football
