= Ian Hamilton (footballer, born 1967) =

English footballer (1967–2023)

Personal information
- Full name: Ian Richard Hamilton
- Date of birth: 14 December 1967
- Place of birth: Stevenage, England
- Date of death: 6 September 2023 (aged 55)
- Height: 5 ft 9 in (1.75 m)
- Position: Midfielder

Youth career
- 1982–1985: Southampton

Senior career*
Years	Team	Apps	(Gls)
1985–1988	Southampton	0	(0)
1988	Cambridge United	24	(1)
1988–1992	Scunthorpe United	145	(18)
1992–1998	West Bromwich Albion	240	(23)
1998–2000	Sheffield United	45	(3)
1999	→ Grimsby Town (loan)	6	(1)
2000–2001	Notts County	34	(0)
2001–2002	Lincoln City	26	(0)
2002–2003	Woking	19	(0)
Total		539	(46)
- * Club domestic league appearances and goals

Ian Richard Hamilton (14 December 1967 – 6 September 2023) was an English professional footballer who played in the Football League as a midfielder between 1988 and 2002. Hamilton spent four years with Scunthorpe United and six with West Bromwich Albion as well as having shorter spells with Southampton, Cambridge United, Sheffield United, Grimsby Town, Notts County, Lincoln City and Woking.

== Career ==
Stevenage-born Hamilton started his career off with Southampton, joining "The Saints" as an associate schoolboy in January 1982. He signed as an apprentice in July 1984, before signing his first professional contract on his 18th birthday in December 1985. He remained at The Dell for a further two years, playing in the reserves but failing to break into the first team, before a free transfer to Cambridge United in March 1988. He remained with the club until December of that year when he made a move to Scunthorpe United on a free transfer.

Hamilton spent the next four years playing for "The Iron", and eventually his performances earned him a move to West Bromwich Albion in 1992 for £160,000. While with "The Baggies", Hamilton played under manager Alan Buckley.

In 1998, Albion sold Hamilton to Sheffield United for £325,000 and he would remain at Bramall Lane for the next two seasons. While at United, he was re-signed by Alan Buckley at fellow First Division side Grimsby Town. Hamilton played six times for "The Mariners", scoring once in his one-month loan spell.

At the end of the 1999–2000 campaign, following his release from United, Hamilton signed for Notts County on a two-year deal. However, in November 2001 he was signed by Buckley for a third time, this time at Lincoln City. He scored his first and only goal for Lincoln against Leyton Orient in the FA Cup. He was part of the squad that was nearly relegated out of the Football League. With the club in financial difficulties, and Hamilton not being part of new manager Keith Alexander's plans, he agreed a severance package in October 2002, and played out the 2002–03 campaign for Conference side Woking before retiring at the end of the season.

== Personal life ==
After retirement as a footballer he worked as an IT business development manager.

His death was announced on the West Bromwich Albion website on 6 September 2023, aged 55.

== Honours ==
West Bromwich Albion

- Football League Second Division play-offs: 1993
