= Andy Hunt (footballer) =

English footballer

Personal information
- Full name: Andrew Hunt
- Date of birth: 9 June 1970 (age 56)
- Place of birth: West Thurrock, Essex, England
- Position: Striker

Senior career*
Years	Team	Apps	(Gls)
1990–1991	Kettering Town	0	(0)
1991–1993	Newcastle United	43	(11)
1993	→ West Bromwich Albion (loan)	9	(9)
1993–1998	West Bromwich Albion	202	(67)
1998–2000	Charlton Athletic	86	(35)
Total		341	(124)
- * Club domestic league appearances and goals

Andrew Hunt (born 9 June 1970) is an English former professional footballer who played as a striker.

== Career ==
Born in West Thurrock, Essex, Hunt started his career in non-league football, whilst training in business and tourism management, with King's Lynn and Kettering Town before being signed by then manager Jim Smith for Newcastle United in early 1991. Smith departed soon after, and Hunt continued to play under his successor Ossie Ardiles.

However, this was not a successful time for the Magpies, who had fallen into the Second Division in 1989 and failed to make even the playoffs in the 1990-91 season. Ardiles reshaped the side for the 1991–92 season by drafting in more young players and adopting a very attacking style of football, but things failed to improve and by the end of October in 1991 the Magpies were bottom of the Second Division.

Ardiles was sacked on 5 February 1992 and replaced by Kevin Keegan, who chose David Kelly and Micky Quinn as his first choice attacking force. Hunt was on the sidelines for much of the next 12 months before departing to West Bromwich Albion, where Ardiles was now the manager. Hunt scored a hat-trick on his home debut for Albion in March 1993 against Brighton. He scored the first goal in the Second Division play-off final in 1993 at Wembley as West Brom beat Port Vale 3–0 to gain promotion.

Hunt was a regular over the next five seasons, creating an effective partnership with Bob Taylor, but West Brom failed to gain another promotion. In 1998, he joined Charlton Athletic, who had just been promoted to the Premier League, on a free transfer. A highlight in his first season at Charlton was scoring twice as they drew 2-2 away at Tottenham Hotspur, however Charlton were relegated at the end of the season. In his second season Hunt scored twenty four goals as Charlton won Division One to win promotion back to the Premiership, scoring three hat-tricks in the process against Norwich City and Stockport County (twice). However, after scoring in what turned out to be his final game for Charlton against Coventry City he retired early from football during the 2000–01 season due to chronic fatigue syndrome. Hunt returned to Charlton briefly in 2003 to try to earn another contract, and played in three reserve games, but was not offered a contract.

Hunt now runs the Belize Jungle Dome and Green Dragon Adventure Travel, a pair of adventure travel companies in Belize, with his wife, former MTV presenter Simone Angel.

== Honours ==
West Bromwich Albion

- Football League Second Division play-offs: 1993

Charlton Athletic

- Football League First Division: 1999–2000

Individual

- PFA Team of the Year: 1999–2000 First Division
- Football League First Division Top Scorer: 1999–2000
