= Paul Raven (footballer) =

English footballer

Personal information
- Full name: Paul Duncan Raven
- Date of birth: 28 July 1970 (age 56)
- Place of birth: Salisbury, England
- Position: Defender

Senior career*
Years	Team	Apps	(Gls)
1987–1989	Doncaster Rovers	52	(4)
1989–2000	West Bromwich Albion	259	(15)
1991–1992	→ Doncaster Rovers (loan)	7	(0)
1998–1999	→ Rotherham United (loan)	11	(3)
2000–2003	Grimsby Town	31	(0)
2003–2004	Carlisle United	24	(1)
2004–2006	Barrow		
Total		426	(22)
- * Club domestic league appearances and goals

Paul Duncan Raven (born 28 July 1970) is a former professional footballer who played as a defender between 1987 and 2006. He notably played for West Bromwich Albion and Grimsby Town.

== Playing career ==
Raven was born in Salisbury, England. He added to the first-team squad at Doncaster Rovers in 1987. After his first season with Rovers, he moved to West Bromwich Albion. Raven played for Albion for the next eleven years, while also spending time on loan with former club Doncaster and Rotherham United.

In July 2000, Raven joined Grimsby Town on a free transfer. Grimsby were managed by Alan Buckley for whom he had previously played at West Brom. Although Buckley was sacked eight weeks later, Raven played for three years at Blundell Park.

In the summer of 2003, he joined Carlisle United along with fellow Grimsby player Steve Livingstone. During his time at Carlisle he scored once against York. After Carlisle, he played out the last two years of his career at Barrow.

== Coaching career ==
Raven is employed as the Head of Personal Development for the Professional Footballers' Association.

== Honours ==
West Bromwich Albion

- Football League Second Division play-offs: 1993

Carlisle United

- Football League Trophy runner-up: 2002–03
