= 1999–2000 West Bromwich Albion F.C. season =

West Bromwich Albion
1999–2000 season
- Chairman: Paul Thompson
- Manager: Brian Little (until 6 March); Cyrille Regis and Allan Evans (caretakers); Gary Megson (from 9 March)
- Stadium: The Hawthorns
- Football League First Division: 21st
- FA Cup: Third round
- League Cup: Third round
- Top goalscorer: Lee Hughes (13)
- Average home league attendance: 14,584

During the 1999–2000 English football season, West Bromwich Albion F.C. competed in the Football League First Division.

== Season summary ==
West Bromwich Albion struggled under the new management of Brian Little and he was sacked in March after just one win from the last 16 league games (between 27 November – 4 March), picking up 9 points from the possible 48 and leaving the club in deep relegation peril. He was replaced by former Stoke City manager Gary Megson, who guided Albion to safety in 21st place.

== Kit ==
West Bromwich Albion retained the previous season's kit, manufactured by Belgian company Patrick and sponsored by the West Bromwich Building Society.

== Final league table ==
Pos	Team	Pld	W	D	L	GF	GA	GD	Pts	Qualification or relegation
19	Crewe Alexandra	46	14	9	23	46	67	−21	51	
20	Grimsby Town	46	13	12	21	41	67	−26	51	
21	West Bromwich Albion	46	10	19	17	43	60	−17	49	
22	Walsall (R)	46	11	13	22	52	77	−25	46	Relegation to the Second Division
23	Port Vale (R)	46	7	15	24	48	69	−21	36	Relegation to the Second Division

Rules for classification: 1) Points; 2) Goal difference; 3) Goals scored
(R) Relegated

== Results ==
West Bromwich Albion's score comes first

=== Legend ===
Win	Draw	Loss

=== Football League First Division ===
Date	Opponent	Venue	Result	Attendance	Scorers
11 August 1999	Norwich City	H	1–1	16,196	Raven
14 August 1999	Port Vale	A	2–1	7,891	Hughes, Kilbane
20 August 1999	Nottingham Forest	H	1–1	13,202	Hughes
28 August 1999	Swindon Town	A	2–1	6,565	Kilbane, Evans
30 August 1999	Fulham	H	0–0	17,120	
11 September 1999	Birmingham City	A	1–1	25,495	Hughes
18 September 1999	Blackburn Rovers	H	2–2	16,902	Kilbane (2)
25 September 1999	Crystal Palace	H	0–0	13,219	
3 October 1999	Wolverhampton Wanderers	A	1–1	25,500	Carbon
16 October 1999	Walsall	H	0–1	19,562	
19 October 1999	Queens Park Rangers	H	0–1	9,874	
23 October 1999	Charlton Athletic	A	0–0	19,346	
26 October 1999	Crystal Palace	A	2–0	12,203	Hughes, Maresca
31 October 1999	Wolverhampton Wanderers	H	1–1	21,097	McDermott
6 November 1999	Tranmere Rovers	A	0–3	6,623	
14 November 1999	Portsmouth	H	3–2	11,483	Maresca, van Blerk, Evans
20 November 1999	Huddersfield Town	A	0–1	14,244	
23 November 1999	Stockport County	H	2–0	9,201	Hughes (2)
27 November 1999	Sheffield United	H	2–2	12,278	Maresca, Evans
4 December 1999	Norwich City	A	1–2	15,183	Kilbane
7 December 1999	Crewe Alexandra	A	0–2	5,419	
14 December 1999	Grimsby Town	A	1–1	4,036	Hughes
18 December 1999	Ipswich Town	A	1–3	14,712	de Freitas
26 December 1999	Manchester City	H	0–2	19,589	
28 December 1999	Bolton Wanderers	A	1–1	16,269	Burgess
3 January 2000	Barnsley	H	0–2	13,411	
15 January 2000	Port Vale	H	0–0	10,831	
22 January 2000	Nottingham Forest	A	0–0	19,863	
29 January 2000	Swindon Town	H	1–1	11,856	Hughes (pen)
5 February 2000	Fulham	A	0–1	12,044	
12 February 2000	Crewe Alexandra	H	1–0	12,406	Hughes
19 February 2000	Sheffield United	A	0–6	14,519	
26 February 2000	Blackburn Rovers	A	1–2	18,184	Carbon
4 March 2000	Birmingham City	H	0–3	17,029	
7 March 2000	Tranmere Rovers	H	2–0	11,958	Flynn, Hughes
11 March 2000	Stockport County	A	1–0	8,238	Hughes
18 March 2000	Huddersfield Town	H	0–1	15,484	
21 March 2000	Portsmouth	A	0–2	14,760	
25 March 2000	Manchester City	A	1–2	32,072	Hughes
4 April 2000	Ipswich Town	H	1–1	12,536	Hughes
8 April 2000	Barnsley	A	2–2	16,329	Sneekes (pen), Taylor
14 April 2000	Bolton Wanderers	H	4–4	12,802	Sneekes (pen), Flynn, Taylor, Oliver
22 April 2000	Walsall	A	1–2	9,161	Flynn
24 April 2000	Grimsby Town	H	2–1	15,291	Taylor (2)
29 April 2000	Queens Park Rangers	A	0–0	15,244	
7 May 2000	Charlton Athletic	H	2–0	22,101	Sneekes, Taylor

=== FA Cup ===
Round	Date	Opponent	Venue	Result	Attendance	Goalscorers
R3	11 December 1999	Blackburn Rovers	H	2–2	10,609	Hughes, Evans
R3R	22 December 1999	Blackburn Rovers	A	0–2	11,766	

=== League Cup ===
Round	Date	Opponent	Venue	Result	Attendance	Goalscorers
R1 1st Leg	10 August 1999	Halifax Town	A	0–0	2,451	
R1 2nd Leg	24 August 1999	Halifax Town	H	5–1	8,316	Kilbane, Hughes, de Freitas, Evans
R2 1st Leg	14 September 1999	Wycombe Wanderers	H	1–1	9,383	Flynn
R2 2nd Leg	21 September 1999	Wycombe Wanderers	A	4–3	5,047	Raven, de Freitas, Quinn, Hughes
R3	12 October 1999	Fulham	H	1–2	10,556	Hughes

== First-team squad ==
Squad at end of season

Note: Flags indicate national team as defined under FIFA eligibility rules; some limited exceptions apply. Players may hold more than one non-FIFA nationality.

No.	Pos.	Nation	Player
1	GK	DEN	Brian Jensen
2	DF	AUS	Andy McDermott
3	DF	AUS	Jason Van Blerk
4	MF	ENG	Sean Flynn
5	DF	ENG	Daryl Burgess
6	DF	ENG	Matt Carbon
7	FW	NIR	James Quinn (Note: Quinn was born in Coventry, England, but also qualified to represent Northern Ireland internationally and made his international debut for Northern Ireland in 1996.)
8	MF	NED	Richard Sneekes
9	FW	IRL	Mickey Evans (Note: Evans was born in Plymouth, England, but also qualified to represent the Republic of Ireland internationally and made his international debut for the Republic of Ireland in October 1997.)
10	FW	ENG	Lee Hughes
11	DF	ENG	Neil Clement (on loan from Chelsea)
12	FW	SUR	Fabian de Freitas
14	DF	ENG	Des Lyttle (on loan from Watford)
15	MF	ENG	Mark Angel
16	DF	ENG	Paul Raven
17	DF	WAL	Paul Mardon (Note: Mardon was born in Bristol, England, but also qualified to represent Wales internationally and made his international debut for Wales in October 1995.)

No.	Pos.	Nation	Player
18	FW	ENG	Bob Taylor
19	MF	ENG	Adam Oliver
20	GK	ENG	Chris Adamson
21	DF	ENG	Graham Potter
22	DF	WAL	Danny Gabbidon
23	DF	ENG	Tony Butler
24	DF	ENG	James Chambers
25	DF	ENG	Adam Chambers
26	FW	ENG	Justin Richards
27	MF	ENG	Michael Garrity
28	MF	ITA	Massimilano Iezzi
29	MF	IRL	Andy Townsend (Note: Townsend was born in Maidstone, England, but also qualified to represent the Republic of Ireland internationally and made his international debut for the Republic of Ireland in February 1989.)
30	DF	ISL	Lárus Sigurðsson
31	GK	NIR	Elliot Morris
32	DF	FRA	Georges Santos (Note: Santos was born in Marseille, France, but also qualified to represent Cape Verde internationally through his parents and would make his international debut for Cape Verde in September 2002.)

=== Left club during season ===
Note: Flags indicate national team as defined under FIFA eligibility rules; some limited exceptions apply. Players may hold more than one non-FIFA nationality.

No.	Pos.	Nation	Player
1	GK	ENG	Phil Whitehead (to Reading)
11	MF	IRL	Kevin Kilbane (Note: Kilbane was born in Preston, England, but also qualified to represent the Republic of Ireland internationally through his parents and represented them at U-21 level before making his international debut for Republic of Ireland in September 1997.) (to Sunderland)
11	MF	DEN	Carsten Fredgaard (on loan from Sunderland)
13	GK	ENG	Alan Miller (to Blackburn Rovers)

No.	Pos.	Nation	Player
14	MF	ITA	Enzo Maresca (to Juventus)
14	MF	JAM	Paul Hall (Note: Hall was born in Manchester, England, but also qualified to represent Jamaica internationally and made his international debut for Jamaica in 1997.) (on loan from Coventry City)
18	DF	ENG	Paul Holmes (to Torquay United)
23	FW	ENG	Brian Quailey (Note: Quailey was born in Leicester, England, but also qualified to represent Saint Kitts and Nevis internationally and represented them at U-23 level.) (to Scunthorpe United)
