= 2000–01 West Bromwich Albion F.C. season =

West Bromwich Albion
2000–01 season
- Chairman: Paul Thompson
- Manager: Gary Megson
- Stadium: The Hawthorns
- Football League First Division: 6th (play-offs)
- Play-offs: Semi-finals
- FA Cup: Third round
- League Cup: Second round
- Top goalscorer: League: Lee Hughes (21); All: Lee Hughes (23)
- Average home league attendance: 17,657

During the 2000–01 English football season, West Bromwich Albion F.C. competed in the Football League First Division.

== Season summary ==
Megson's rejuvenation of the side continued in 2000–01, as Albion finished sixth, their highest league finish since relegation in 1986. They qualified for the Division One promotion playoffs, where they faced Bolton Wanderers in the semi-finals. The first leg finished 2–2 after Albion had led 2–0. Bolton won the second leg 3–0 to reach the final 5–2 on aggregate.

Albion's home match against Barnsley on 1 January 2001 was the last to be played in front of the Rainbow Stand, which was subsequently demolished before construction began on the new East Stand.

== Final league table ==
Pos	Team	Pld	W	D	L	GF	GA	GD	Pts	Qualification or relegation
4	Preston North End	46	23	9	14	64	52	+12	78	Qualification for the First Division play-offs
5	Birmingham City	46	23	9	14	59	48	+11	78	Qualification for the First Division play-offs
6	West Bromwich Albion	46	21	11	14	60	52	+8	74	Qualification for the First Division play-offs
7	Burnley	46	21	9	16	50	54	−4	72	
8	Wimbledon	46	17	18	11	71	50	+21	69	

Rules for classification: 1) Points; 2) Goal difference; 3) Goals scored

== Results ==
West Bromwich Albion's score comes first

=== Legend ===
Win	Draw	Loss

=== Football League First Division ===
Date	Opponent	Venue	Result	Attendance	Scorers
12 August 2000	Nottingham Forest	A	0–1	21,209	
19 August 2000	Bolton Wanderers	H	0–2	17,316 (1,477)	
26 August 2000	Barnsley	A	1–4	19,542	Hughes
28 August 2000	Queens Park Rangers	H	2–1	14,831 (925)	van Blerk, Hughes
3 September 2000	Crystal Palace	H	1–0	13,980 (706)	McInnes
9 September 2000	Stockport County	A	0–0	6,632	
12 September 2000	Crewe Alexandra	A	1–0	6,222	Hughes
17 September 2000	Birmingham City	H	1–1	19,858 (4,923)	Taylor
23 September 2000	Portsmouth	A	1–0	11,937 (1,698)	Roberts
30 September 2000	Blackburn Rovers	H	1–0	16,794 (1,413)	Hughes
8 October 2000	Sheffield Wednesday	A	2–1	15,338 (1,968)	Roberts (2)
14 October 2000	Norwich City	H	2–3	16,511 (967)	Clement, Hughes (pen)
17 October 2000	Wolverhampton Wanderers	H	1–0	21,492 (5,162)	Hughes (pen)
21 October 2000	Tranmere Rovers	A	2–2	8,931 (1,893)	Hughes, Roberts
24 October 2000	Wimbledon	H	3–1	15,570 (137)	Roberts, van Blerk, Sneekes
29 October 2000	Grimsby Town	A	0–2	5,429 (856)	
4 November 2000	Burnley	H	1–1	17,828 (2,458)	Roberts
11 November 2000	Huddersfield Town	A	2–0	11,801	Jordão, Hughes
18 November 2000	Gillingham	H	3–1	16,410 (1,263)	Hughes (3)
25 November 2000	Preston North End	H	3–1	20,043 (2,700)	Hughes (3)
2 December 2000	Wimbledon	A	1–0	8,608 (1,563)	Williams (own goal)
9 December 2000	Fulham	H	1–3	22,301 (1,881)	Lyttle
16 December 2000	Watford	A	3–3	14,601 (2,164)	Hughes, Baardsen (own goal), Roberts
23 December 2000	Nottingham Forest	H	3–0	20,350 (1,802)	Roberts (2), Olsen (own goal)
26 December 2000	Sheffield United	A	0–2	22,281 (2,225)	
30 December 2000	Bolton Wanderers	A	1–0	18,985 (2,138)	Roberts
1 January 2001	Barnsley	H	1–0	19,423	Morgan (own goal)
13 January 2001	Queens Park Rangers	A	0–2	11,881 (2,600)	
20 January 2001	Sheffield United	H	2–1	16,778 (1,673)	Fox, Hughes
3 February 2001	Crystal Palace	A	2–2	16,692 (2,318)	Sneekes, Hughes
10 February 2001	Stockport County	H	1–1	16,385	Roberts
17 February 2001	Birmingham City	A	1–2	25,025 (3,300)	Butler
20 February 2001	Crewe Alexandra	H	2–2	15,476 (585)	Taylor, Roberts
24 February 2001	Portsmouth	H	2–0	17,645 (1,696)	Roberts, Chambers
3 March 2001	Blackburn Rovers	A	0–1	23,926	
6 March 2001	Norwich City	A	1–0	16,372	Hughes (pen)
10 March 2001	Sheffield Wednesday	H	1–2	18,662 (1,326)	Hughes
18 March 2001	Wolverhampton Wanderers	A	1–3	25,069 (3,198)	Clement
25 March 2001	Tranmere Rovers	H	2–1	17,151 (681)	Taylor (2)
31 March 2001	Watford	H	3–0	17,261	Quinn, Hughes, Clement
7 April 2001	Fulham	A	0–0	17,795 (2,846)	
14 April 2001	Burnley	A	1–1	18,199 (2,739)	Taylor
16 April 2001	Grimsby Town	H	0–1	16,504	
21 April 2001	Gillingham	A	2–1	9,920 (1,600)	Hughes, Clement
28 April 2001	Huddersfield Town	H	1–1	17,542 (1,287)	Roberts
6 May 2001	Preston North End	A	1–2	16,226 (2,750)	Clement

=== First Division play-offs ===
Round	Date	Opponent	Venue	Result	Attendance	Goalscorers
SF 1st Leg	13 May 2001	Bolton Wanderers	H	2–2	18,167 (1,980)	Roberts, Hughes (pen)
SF 2nd Leg	17 May 2001	Bolton Wanderers	A	0–3 (lost 2–5 on agg)	23,515 (3,800)	

=== FA Cup ===
Round	Date	Opponent	Venue	Result	Attendance	Goalscorers
R3	6 January 2001	Derby County	A	2–3	19,232	Taylor, Hughes

=== League Cup ===
Round	Date	Opponent	Venue	Result	Attendance	Goalscorers
R1 1st Leg	22 August 2000	Swansea City	A	0–0	4,758	
R1 2nd Leg	6 September 2000	Swansea City	H	2–1 (won 2–1 on agg)	7,328	Roberts (2)
R2 1st Leg	19 September 2000	Derby County	A	2–1	12,183	Clement, Sneekes
R2 2nd Leg	26 September 2000	Derby County	H	2–4 (lost 4–5 on agg)	19,112	Jordão, Clement

== First-team squad ==
Squad at end of season

Note: Flags indicate national team as defined under FIFA eligibility rules; some limited exceptions apply. Players may hold more than one non-FIFA nationality.

No.	Pos.	Nation	Player
1	GK	DEN	Brian Jensen
2	DF	ENG	Des Lyttle
3	DF	ENG	Neil Clement
4	MF	SCO	Derek McInnes
5	DF	ENG	Tony Butler
6	DF	ENG	Matt Carbon
7	MF	ENG	Ruel Fox (Note: Fox was born in Norwich, England, and played for the England B team, but also qualified to represent Montserrat internationally and would make his international debut for Montserrat in 2004.)
8	MF	NED	Richard Sneekes
9	FW	ENG	Bob Taylor
10	FW	ENG	Lee Hughes
11	FW	GRN	Jason Roberts (Note: Roberts was born in Park Royal, England, but also qualified to represent Grenada internationally through his father and made his international debut for Grenada in 1998.)
12	MF	NIR	James Quinn (Note: Quinn was born in Coventry, England, but also qualified to represent Northern Ireland internationally and made his international debut for Northern Ireland in 1996.)
14	DF	AUS	Jason van Blerk

No.	Pos.	Nation	Player
15	DF	ENG	Daryl Burgess
16	DF	SCO	Warren Cummings (on loan from Chelsea)
17	DF	ISL	Lárus Sigurðsson
18	DF	SVK	Igor Bališ
20	MF	POR	Jordão (Note: Jordão was born in Malanje, Portuguese Angola (now Angola), but also qualified to represent Portugal internationally and represented them at U-21 level.)
21	GK	ENG	Russell Hoult
22	DF	ENG	James Chambers
23	DF	ENG	Adam Chambers
24	FW	ENG	Adam Oliver
25	MF	ENG	Michael Appleton
27	DF	ENG	Phil Gilchrist
30	GK	ENG	Chris Adamson

=== Left club during season ===
Note: Flags indicate national team as defined under FIFA eligibility rules; some limited exceptions apply. Players may hold more than one non-FIFA nationality.

No.	Pos.	Nation	Player
16	FW	IRL	Mickey Evans (Note: Evans was born in Plymouth, England, but also qualified to represent the Republic of Ireland internationally and made his international debut for the Republic of Ireland in October 1997.) (to Bristol Rovers)
16	MF	ENG	Tony Grant (on loan from Manchester City)
18	FW	SUR	Fabian de Freitas (released)
19	DF	WAL	Paul Mardon (Note: Mardon was born in Bristol, England, but also qualified to represent Wales internationally and made his international debut for Wales in October 1995.) (released)

No.	Pos.	Nation	Player
25	DF	WAL	Danny Gabbidon (to Cardiff City)
27	FW	ENG	Justin Richards (to Bristol Rovers)
27	DF	NED	Fernando Derveld (on loan from Norwich City)

== Reserve squad ==
Note: Flags indicate national team as defined under FIFA eligibility rules; some limited exceptions apply. Players may hold more than one non-FIFA nationality.

No.	Pos.	Nation	Player
26	MF	ITA	Massimiliano Iezzi
28	FW	ENG	Matthew Turner

No.	Pos.	Nation	Player
29	MF	ENG	Mark Briggs
31	GK	NIR	Elliot Morris
