= 2002–03 West Bromwich Albion F.C. season =

West Bromwich Albion
2002–03 season
- Chairman: Jeremy Peace
- Manager: Gary Megson
- Stadium: The Hawthorns
- Premier League: 19th (relegated)
- FA Cup: Fourth round
- League Cup: Third round
- Top goalscorer: League: Daniele Dichio and Scott Dobie (5); All: Daniele Dichio (8)
- Average home league attendance: 26,776

The 2002–03 season was West Bromwich Albion's first season in the Premier League, and their first season in the top division of English football since 1985–86.

== Season summary ==
West Brom finished the season in 19th position in the Premier League table, meaning that they were relegated back to the First Division. In other competitions, West Brom reached the fourth round of the FA Cup and the third round of the League Cup.

Danny Dichio was the top scorer for Albion with 8 goals in all competitions, while his five league goals saw him finish as joint top league scorer along with Scott Dobie.

== Final league table ==
Pos	Team	Pld	W	D	L	GF	GA	GD	Pts	Qualification or relegation
16	Aston Villa	38	12	9	17	42	47	−5	45	
17	Bolton Wanderers	38	10	14	14	41	51	−10	44	
18	West Ham United (R)	38	10	12	16	42	59	−17	42	Relegation to Football League First Division
19	West Bromwich Albion (R)	38	6	8	24	29	65	−36	26	Relegation to Football League First Division
20	Sunderland (R)	38	4	7	27	21	65	−44	19	Relegation to Football League First Division

Source: Premier League
Rules for classification: 1) points; 2) goal difference; 3) number of goals scored.
(R) Relegated

== Premier League ==
17 August 2002 1	Manchester United	1–0	West Bromwich Albion	Manchester
	Solskjær 78'		McInnes (red card) 63'	Stadium: Old Trafford; Attendance: 67,645 (3,100 away)

24 August 2002 2	West Bromwich Albion	1–3	Leeds United	West Bromwich
	Marshall 90'		Kewell 39'; Bowyer 53'; Viduka 71'	Stadium: The Hawthorns; Attendance: 26,618 (2,594 away)

27 August 2002 3	Arsenal	5–2	West Bromwich Albion	London
	Cole 3'; Lauren 21'; Wiltord 24', 77'; Aliadière 90'		Dobie 51'; Roberts 87'	Stadium: Highbury; Attendance: 37,920 (2,900 away)

31 August 2002 4	West Bromwich Albion	1–0	Fulham	West Bromwich
	Moore 49'			Stadium: The Hawthorns; Attendance: 25,461 (1,757 away fans)

11 September 2002 5	West Ham United	0–1	West Bromwich Albion	London
			Roberts 28'	Stadium: Boleyn Ground; Attendance: 34,957 (3,000 away fans)

14 September 2002 6	West Bromwich Albion	1–0	Southampton	West Bromwich
	Gregan 79'		Williams (red card) 74'	Stadium: The Hawthorns; Attendance: 26,383

21 September 2002 7	Liverpool	2–0	West Bromwich Albion	Liverpool
	Baroš 56'; Riise 90'		Hoult (red card) 33'	Stadium: Anfield; Attendance: 43,830 (3,000 away)

30 September 2002 8	West Bromwich Albion	0–2	Blackburn Rovers	West Bromwich
			Yorke 72' (pen.); Duff 76'	Stadium: The Hawthorns; Attendance: 25,170 (1,452 away)

5 October 2002 9	Newcastle United	2–1	West Bromwich Albion	Newcastle upon Tyne
	Shearer 45', 69'		Bališ 27'	Stadium: St James' Park; Attendance: 52,142 (3,000 away)

19 October 2002 10	West Bromwich Albion	1–1	Birmingham City	West Bromwich
	Roberts 87'		Tébily (red card) 81'; Moore 86' (o.g.)	Stadium: The Hawthorns; Attendance: 27,021 (2,600 away)

26 October 2002 11	Chelsea	2–0	West Bromwich Albion	London
	Hasselbaink 30'; Le Saux 55'			Stadium: Stamford Bridge; Attendance: 40,893 (2,650 away)

2 November 2002 12	West Bromwich Albion	1–2	Manchester City	West Bromwich
	Clement 62'		Anelka 51'; Goater 71'	Stadium: The Hawthorns; Attendance: 27,044

9 November 2002 13	Bolton Wanderers	1–1	West Bromwich Albion	Bolton
	N'Gotty (red card) 19'; Frandsen 89'		Dobie 17'	Stadium: Reebok Stadium; Attendance: 23,630 (2,300 away)

16 November 2002 14	West Bromwich Albion	0–0	Aston Villa	West Bromwich
				Stadium: The Hawthorns; Attendance: 27,091 (2,600 away)

23 November 2002 15	Everton	1–0	West Bromwich Albion	Liverpool
	Radzinski 55'			Stadium: Goodison Park; Attendance: 40,113 (3,000 away)

30 November 2002 16	West Bromwich Albion	1–0	Middlesbrough	West Bromwich
	Dichio 72'			Stadium: The Hawthorns; Attendance: 27,029

8 December 2002 17	Tottenham Hotspur	3–1	West Bromwich Albion	London
	Ziege 3'; Keane 29'; Poyet 80'		Dobie 73'	Stadium: White Hart Lane; Attendance: 35,958 (2,900 away)

14 December 2002 18	Aston Villa	2–1	West Bromwich Albion	Birmingham
	Vassell 16'; Staunton (red card) 67'; Hitzlsperger 90'		Koumas 29'	Stadium: Villa Park; Attendance: 40,391 (3,400 away)

21 December 2002 19	West Bromwich Albion	2–2	Sunderland	West Bromwich
	Dichio 26'; Koumas 32'		Phillips 56', 64'	Stadium: The Hawthorns; Attendance: 26,703

26 December 2002 20	West Bromwich Albion	1–2	Arsenal	West Bromwich
	Dichio 3'		Jeffers 48'; Henry 85'	Stadium: The Hawthorns; Attendance: 27,025 (2,588 away)

28 December 2002 21	Charlton Athletic	1–0	West Bromwich Albion	London
	Lisbie 6'			Stadium: The Valley; Attendance: 26,196

11 January 2003 22	West Bromwich Albion	1–3	Manchester United	West Bromwich
	Koumas 6'		van Nistelrooy 7'; Scholes 22'; Solskjær 55'	Stadium: The Hawthorns; Attendance: 27,129 (2,600 away)

18 January 2003 23	Leeds United	0–0	West Bromwich Albion	Leeds
			Johnson (red card) 72'	Stadium: Elland Road; Attendance: 39,708 (3,050 away)

29 January 2003 24	West Bromwich Albion	0–1	Charlton Athletic	West Bromwich
			Bartlett 60'	Stadium: The Hawthorns; Attendance: 26,113 (953 away)

1 February 2003 25	Manchester City	1–2	West Bromwich Albion	Manchester
	Gilchrist 22' (o.g.)		Clement 17'; Moore 71'; Roberts (red card) 80'	Stadium: Maine Road; Attendance: 34,765 (2,800 away)

8 February 2003 26	West Bromwich Albion	1–1	Bolton Wanderers	West Bromwich
	Johnson 90'		Pedersen 18'	Stadium: The Hawthorns; Attendance: 26,933

19 February 2003 27	Fulham	3–0	West Bromwich Albion	London
	Saha 72'; Wome 74'; Malbranque 77' (pen.)			Stadium: Loftus Road; Attendance: 15,799

23 February 2003 28	West Bromwich Albion	1–2	West Ham United	West Bromwich
	Dichio 50'		Sinclair 45', 67'	Stadium: The Hawthorns; Attendance: 27,042 (2,595 away)

1 March 2003 29	Southampton	1–0	West Bromwich Albion	Southampton
	Beattie 7'			Stadium: St Mary's Stadium; Attendance: 31,915 (3,200 away)

16 March 2003 30	West Bromwich Albion	0–2	Chelsea	West Bromwich
			Stanic 38'; Zola 55'	Stadium: The Hawthorns; Attendance: 27,024

22 March 2003 31	Birmingham City	1–0	West Bromwich Albion	Birmingham
	Horsfield 90'			Stadium: St Andrews; Attendance: 29,449 (2,700 away)

5 April 2003 32	Middlesbrough	3–0	West Bromwich Albion	Middlesbrough
	Christie 36'; Greening 76'; Németh 87'			Stadium: Riverside Stadium; Attendance: 30,187 (2,077 away)

12 April 2003 33	West Bromwich Albion	1–2	Everton	West Bromwich
	Bališ 18' (pen.)		Hoult 23' (o.g.); Campbell 45'	Stadium: The Hawthorns; Attendance: 27,039 (2,594 away)

19 April 2003 34	Sunderland	1–2	West Bromwich Albion	Sunderland
	Stewart 70'		McInnes 39', 42'	Stadium: Stadium of Light; Attendance: 36,025 (2,798 away)

21 April 2003 35	West Bromwich Albion	2–3	Tottenham Hotspur	West Bromwich
	Dichio 24' (pen.); Clement 61'		Keane 45', 84'; Sheringham 62'	Stadium: The Hawthorns; Attendance: 26,899 (2,593 away)

26 April 2003 36	West Bromwich Albion	0–6	Liverpool	West Bromwich
			Owen 15', 49', 61', 67'; Baroš 47', 84'	Stadium: The Hawthorns; Attendance: 27,128 (2,597 away)

3 May 2003 37	Blackburn Rovers	1–1	West Bromwich Albion	Blackburn
	Duff 12'		Koumas 54'	Stadium: Ewood Park; Attendance: 27,470 (3,000 away)

11 May 2003 38	West Bromwich Albion	2–2	Newcastle United	West Bromwich
	Dobie 57', 72'		Jenas 44'; Viana 80'	Stadium: The Hawthorns; Attendance: 27,036 (2,596 away)

== FA Cup ==
4 January 2003 Round 3	West Bromwich Albion	3–1	Bradford City	West Bromwich
	Dichio 4', 11', 19'		Danks 79'	Stadium: The Hawthorns; Attendance: 19,909

25 January 2003 Round 4	Watford	1–0	West Bromwich Albion	Watford
	Helguson 80'			Stadium: Vicarage Road; Attendance: 16,975

== League Cup ==
2 October 2002 Round 2	Wigan Athletic	3–1	West Bromwich Albion	Wigan
	Ellington 31', 61', 80'		Hughes 89'	Stadium: JJB Stadium; Attendance: 6,558

== Players ==
=== First-team squad ===
Note: Flags indicate national team as defined under FIFA eligibility rules; some limited exceptions apply. Players may hold more than one non-FIFA nationality.

No.	Pos.	Nation	Player
1	GK	ENG	Russell Hoult
2	DF	SVK	Igor Bališ
3	DF	ENG	Neil Clement
4	MF	SCO	Derek McInnes
5	DF	JAM	Darren Moore (Note: Moore was born in Birmingham, England, but also qualified to represent Jamaica internationally and made his international debut for Jamaica in 1999.)
6	DF	ENG	Phil Gilchrist
7	MF	ENG	Ronnie Wallwork
9	FW	ENG	Daniele Dichio
10	MF	WAL	Andy Johnson (Note: Johnson was born in Bristol, England, but also qualified to represent Wales internationally and made his international debut for Wales in 1998.)
11	FW	GRN	Jason Roberts (Note: Roberts was born in Park Royal, England, but also qualified to represent Grenada internationally through his father and made his international debut for Grenada in 1998.)
12	FW	SCO	Scott Dobie (Note: Dobie was born in Workington, England, but also qualified to represent Scotland internationally and made his international debut for Scotland in May 2002.)
14	MF	ENG	Sean Gregan
15	FW	ENG	Bob Taylor

No.	Pos.	Nation	Player
16	MF	ENG	Lee Marshall
17	DF	ISL	Lárus Sigurðsson
18	MF	WAL	Jason Koumas
19	FW	ENG	Lee Hughes
20	MF	POR	Jordão (Note: Jordão was born in Malanje, Portuguese Angola (now Angola), but also qualified to represent Portugal internationally and represented them at U-21 level.)
21	GK	DEN	Brian Jensen
22	DF	ENG	James Chambers
23	DF	ENG	Adam Chambers
24	DF	NGR	Ifeanyi Udeze (on loan from PAOK Thessaloniki)
25	DF	ENG	Des Lyttle
31	GK	IRL	Joe Murphy
34	MF	ENG	Lloyd Dyer

==== Left club during season ====
Note: Flags indicate national team as defined under FIFA eligibility rules; some limited exceptions apply. Players may hold more than one non-FIFA nationality.

No. / Pos. / Nation / Player; 24 / DF / ENG / Tony Butler (to Bristol City)	No. / Pos. / Nation / Player; 30 / GK / ENG / Chris Adamson (to St. Patrick's Athletic)

=== Reserve squad ===
Note: Flags indicate national team as defined under FIFA eligibility rules; some limited exceptions apply. Players may hold more than one non-FIFA nationality.

No.	Pos.	Nation	Player
8	MF	ENG	Michael Appleton
27	DF	ENG	Ross Adams
28	FW	ENG	Matthew Turner
29	MF	ENG	Mark Briggs

No.	Pos.	Nation	Player
32	DF	ENG	Matt Collins
33	FW	ENG	Mark Scott
35	MF	ENG	Tamika Mkandawire (Note: Mkandawire was born in Mzuzu, Malawi, but held United Kingdom citizenship and was ineligible to represent Malawi internationally.)

== Transfers ==
=== Transfers in ===
Date	Pos.	Name	From	Fee	Ref.
1 July 2002	GK	Joe Murphy	Tranmere Rovers	£250,000	
1 July 2002	MF	Ronnie Wallwork	Manchester United	Free	
3 August 2002	MF	Sean Gregan	Preston North End	£2,000,000	
14 August 2002	MF	Lee Marshall	Leicester City	£700,000	
29 August 2002	FW	Lee Hughes	Coventry City	£2,500,000	
29 August 2002	MF	Jason Koumas	Tranmere Rovers	£2,250,000	

=== Loans in ===
Date from	Pos.	Name	From	Date until	Ref.
12 January 2003	DF	Ifeanyi Udeze	PAOK	End of season	

=== Transfers out ===
Date	Pos.	Name	To	Fee	Ref.
24 April 2002	MF	Ruel Fox	None	Released	
30 April 2002	FW	James Quinn	Willem II	Free	
1 July 2002	MF	Adam Oliver	Released	N/A	
1 July 2002	GK	Elliot Morris	Glentoran	Free	

== Statistics ==
=== Overview ===
Competition	Record							
Competition	P	W	D	L	GF	GA	GD	Win %
Premier League	38	6	8	24	29	65	−36	15.79
FA Cup	2	1	0	1	3	2	+1	50.00
League Cup	1	0	0	1	1	3	−2	0.00
Total	41	7	8	26	33	70	−37	17.07

=== Appearances and goals ===
No.	Pos	Nat	Player	Total		Premier League		FA Cup		League Cup	
No.	Pos	Nat	Player	Apps	Goals	Apps	Goals	Apps	Goals	Apps	Goals
Goalkeepers
1	GK	(England) ENG	Russell Hoult	39	0	37	0	2	0	0	0
31	GK	(Republic of Ireland) IRL	Joe Murphy	3	0	1+1	0	0	0	1	0
Defenders
2	DF	(Slovakia) SVK	Igor Bališ	29	2	27+1	2	0+1	0	0	0
3	DF	(England) ENG	Neil Clement	39	3	34+2	3	2	0	0+1	0
5	DF	(England) ENG	Darren Moore	31	2	29	2	2	0	0	0
6	DF	(England) ENG	Phil Gilchrist	24	0	22	0	1+1	0	0	0
17	DF	(Iceland) ISL	Lárus Sigurðsson	32	0	23+6	0	1+1	0	1	0
22	DF	(England) ENG	James Chambers	9	0	2+6	0	0	0	1	0
24	DF	(Nigeria) NGR	Ifeanyi Udeze	11	0	7+4	0	0	0	0	0
25	DF	(England) ENG	Des Lyttle	5	0	2+2	0	0	0	1	0
Midfielders
4	MF	(Scotland) SCO	Derek McInnes	30	2	28+1	2	1	0	0	0
7	MF	(England) ENG	Ronnie Wallwork	30	0	23+4	0	2	0	1	0
10	MF	(Wales) WAL	Andy Johnson	34	1	30+2	1	2	0	0	0
14	MF	(England) ENG	Sean Gregan	38	1	36	1	2	0	0	0
16	MF	(England) ENG	Lee Marshall	10	1	4+5	1	0	0	1	0
18	MF	(Wales) WAL	Jason Koumas	35	4	27+5	4	2	0	1	0
20	MF	(Portugal) POR	Jordão	4	0	0+3	0	0	0	1	0
23	MF	(England) ENG	Adam Chambers	15	0	10+3	0	1+1	0	0	0
34	MF	(England) ENG	Lloyd Dyer	1	0	0	0	0	0	1	0
Forwards
9	FW	(England) ENG	Danny Dichio	31	8	19+9	5	2	3	1	0
11	FW	(Grenada) GRN	Jason Roberts	34	3	31+1	3	2	0	0	0
12	FW	(Scotland) SCO	Scott Dobie	34	5	10+21	5	0+2	0	0+1	0
15	FW	(England) ENG	Bob Taylor	4	0	2+2	0	0	0	0	0
19	FW	(England) ENG	Lee Hughes	24	1	14+9	0	0	0	1	1

== See also ==
- West Bromwich Albion F.C. seasons
