= 1997–98 West Bromwich Albion F.C. season =

West Bromwich Albion
1997–98 season
- Chairman: Tony Hale
- Manager: Ray Harford (until 4 December); Richie Barker and John Trewick (caretaker managers until 24 December); Denis Smith (from 24 December)
- Stadium: The Hawthorns
- First Division: 10th
- FA Cup: Fourth round
- League Cup: Third round
- Top goalscorer: League: Hughes (14); All: Hunt/Hughes (14)
- Highest home attendance: 23,013 v Nottingham Forest
- Lowest home attendance: 7,227 v Luton Town
- Average home league attendance: 17,004 (16,635 all competitions)

During the 1997–98 English football season, West Bromwich Albion F.C. competed in the Football League First Division.

In the first few months of the 1997–98 season, West Brom established themselves in the top six. Harford then stunned Albion supporters by moving to QPR after less than a year in charge, making way for Denis Smith, who struggled to maintain the momentum created by Harford, and the Baggies could only finish 10th.

Nigel Spink (24) became the oldest goalkeeper to appear for the club when, at the age of 39 years and 19 days, he kept goal in a League Cup tie against Cambridge United on 27 August 1997, a record since broken by Dean Kiely at 39 years, 189 days.

== Final league table ==
| Pos | Team | Pld | W | D | L | GF | GA | GD | Pts |
|---|---|---|---|---|---|---|---|---|---|
| 8 | Stockport County | 46 | 19 | 8 | 19 | 71 | 69 | +2 | 65 |
| 9 | Wolverhampton Wanderers | 46 | 18 | 11 | 17 | 57 | 53 | +4 | 65 |
| 10 | West Bromwich Albion | 46 | 16 | 13 | 17 | 50 | 56 | −6 | 61 |
| 11 | Crewe Alexandra | 46 | 18 | 5 | 23 | 58 | 65 | −7 | 59 |
| 12 | Oxford United | 46 | 16 | 10 | 20 | 60 | 64 | −4 | 58 |

Source: Statto.com
Rules for classification: 1) Points; 2) Goals scored; 3) Goal difference

== Results ==
West Bromwich Albion's score comes first

=== Legend ===
| Win | Draw | Loss |

=== Football League First Division ===
| Date | Opponent | Venue | Result | Attendance | Scorers |
|---|---|---|---|---|---|
| 9 August 1997 | Tranmere Rovers | H | 2–1 | 16,727 | Kilbane, Hunt |
| 16 August 1997 | Crewe Alexandra | A | 3–2 | 5,234 | Hunt (pen), Hughes (2) |
| 24 August 1997 | Wolverhampton Wanderers | H | 1–0 | 22,511 | Curle (own goal) |
| 30 August 1997 | Ipswich Town | A | 1–1 | 13,508 | Sneekes |
| 3 September 1997 | Stoke City | A | 0–0 | 17,500 | |
| 7 September 1997 | Reading | H | 1–0 | 15,966 | Hunt |
| 13 September 1997 | Queens Park Rangers | A | 0–2 | 14,399 | |
| 20 September 1997 | Swindon Town | H | 0–0 | 16,237 | |
| 27 September 1997 | Bury | A | 3–1 | 6,439 | Peschisolido (3) |
| 4 October 1997 | Oxford United | H | 1–2 | 15,889 | Hunt |
| 18 October 1997 | Portsmouth | A | 3–2 | 9,158 | Mardon, Hunt (2) |
| 21 October 1997 | Nottingham Forest | A | 0–1 | 19,243 | |
| 25 October 1997 | Sheffield United | H | 2–0 | 17,311 | Hunt, Hughes |
| 1 November 1997 | Bradford City | A | 0–0 | 16,212 | |
| 4 November 1997 | Norwich City | H | 1–0 | 13,949 | Hughes |
| 8 November 1997 | Charlton Athletic | H | 1–0 | 16,124 | Hunt |
| 15 November 1997 | Port Vale | A | 2–1 | 11,124 | Hunt, Hamilton |
| 23 November 1997 | Birmingham City | H | 1–0 | 18,444 | Sneekes |
| 29 November 1997 | Middlesbrough | A | 0–1 | 30,164 | |
| 2 December 1997 | Manchester City | H | 0–1 | 17,904 | |
| 6 December 1997 | Stockport County | H | 3–2 | 14,957 | Sneekes, Hughes, Hunt |
| 13 December 1997 | Sunderland | A | 0–2 | 29,231 | |
| 20 December 1997 | Huddersfield Town | H | 0–2 | 14,619 | |
| 26 December 1997 | Reading | A | 1–2 | 10,154 | Kilbane |
| 28 December 1997 | Stoke City | H | 1–1 | 19,690 | Hunt |
| 9 January 1998 | Tranmere Rovers | A | 0–0 | 8,058 | |
| 17 January 1998 | Crewe Alexandra | H | 0–1 | 15,257 | |
| 27 January 1998 | Ipswich Town | H | 2–3 | 12,403 | Murphy, Flynn |
| 31 January 1998 | Wolverhampton Wanderers | A | 1–0 | 28,244 | Hunt |
| 7 February 1998 | Swindon Town | A | 2–0 | 9,861 | Carbon, Evans |
| 14 February 1998 | Queens Park Rangers | H | 1–1 | 20,143 | Hughes |
| 17 February 1998 | Oxford United | A | 1–2 | 9,412 | Taylor |
| 21 February 1998 | Bury | H | 1–1 | 15,840 | Hughes |
| 24 February 1998 | Portsmouth | H | 0–3 | 12,757 | |
| 28 February 1998 | Manchester City | A | 0–1 | 28,460 | |
| 3 March 1998 | Charlton Athletic | A | 0–5 | 10,893 | |
| 7 March 1998 | Bradford City | H | 1–1 | 13,281 | Burgess |
| 14 March 1998 | Norwich City | A | 1–1 | 16,663 | Hughes |
| 21 March 1998 | Port Vale | H | 2–2 | 14,242 | Flynn, Taylor |
| 28 March 1998 | Birmingham City | A | 0–1 | 23,260 | |
| 4 April 1998 | Middlesbrough | H | 2–1 | 21,620 | Quinn (2, 1 pen) |
| 11 April 1998 | Stockport County | A | 1–2 | 7,943 | Hughes |
| 13 April 1998 | Sunderland | H | 3–3 | 22,181 | Hughes (2), Kilbane |
| 18 April 1998 | Huddersfield Town | A | 0–1 | 11,704 | |
| 25 April 1998 | Sheffield United | A | 4–2 | 21,248 | Hunt, Hughes (2), Kilbane |
| 3 May 1998 | Nottingham Forest | H | 1–1 | 23,013 | Hughes (pen) |

=== FA Cup ===
| Round | Date | Opponent | Venue | Result | Attendance | Goalscorers |
|---|---|---|---|---|---|---|
| R3 | 13 January 1998 | Stoke City | H | 3–1 | 17,598 | Sneekes (2), Kilbane |
| R4 | 24 January 1998 | Aston Villa | A | 0–4 | 39,372 | |

=== League Cup ===
| Round | Date | Opponent | Venue | Result | Attendance | Goalscorers |
|---|---|---|---|---|---|---|
| R1 First Leg | 12 August 1997 | Cambridge United | A | 1–1 | 3,520 | Peschisolido |
| R1 Second Leg | 27 August 1997 | Cambridge United | H | 2–1 (won 3–2 on agg) | 10,264 | Hunt, Sneekes (pen) |
| R2 First Leg | 16 September 1997 | Luton Town | A | 1–1 | 3,437 | Taylor |
| R2 Second Leg | 23 September 1997 | Luton Town | H | 4–2 (won 5–3 on agg) | 7,227 | Raven, McDermott, Peschisolido (2) |
| R3 | 15 October 1997 | Liverpool | H | 0–2 | 22,986 | |

== First-team squad ==
Squad at end of season

Note: Flags indicate national team as defined under FIFA eligibility rules; some limited exceptions apply. Players may hold more than one non-FIFA nationality.

| No. | Pos. | Nation | Player |
|---|---|---|---|
| — | GK | (England) ENG | Alan Miller |
| — | GK | (England) ENG | Chris Adamson |
| — | GK | (England) ENG | Paul Crichton |
| — | GK | (England) ENG | Nigel Spink |
| — | GK | (Scotland) SCO | Gary Germaine (Note: Germaine was born in Birmingham, England, but also qualified to represent Scotland internationally and represented them at U-21 level.) |
| — | DF | (England) ENG | Paul Holmes |
| — | DF | (Wales) WAL | Paul Mardon (Note: Mardon was born in Bristol, England, but also qualified to represent Wales internationally and made his international debut for Wales in October 1995.) |
| — | DF | (England) ENG | Matt Carbon |
| — | DF | (England) ENG | Daryl Burgess |
| — | DF | (England) ENG | Shane Nicholson |
| — | MF | (Republic of Ireland) IRL | Kevin Kilbane (Note: Kilbane was born in Preston, England, but also qualified to represent the Republic of Ireland internationally through his parents and represented them at U-21 level before making his international debut for Republic of Ireland in September 1997.) |
| — | MF | (Netherlands) NED | Richard Sneekes |
| — | MF | (England) ENG | Peter Butler |
| — | MF | (England) ENG | Ian Hamilton |
| — | MF | (England) ENG | Sean Flynn |
| — | FW | (England) ENG | Andy Hunt |
| — | FW | (England) ENG | Lee Hughes |
| — | MF | (England) ENG | David Smith |
| — | DF | (Australia) AUS | Shaun Murphy |

| No. | Pos. | Nation | Player |
|---|---|---|---|
| — | DF | (Australia) AUS | Andy McDermott |
| — | FW | (Northern Ireland) NIR | James Quinn (Note: Quinn was born in Coventry, England, but also qualified to represent Northern Ireland internationally and made his international debut for Northern Ireland in 1996.) |
| — | FW | (England) ENG | Bob Taylor |
| — | DF | (Scotland) SCO | Steve Nicol |
| — | DF | (England) ENG | Paul Raven |
| — | DF | (Australia) AUS | Jason van Blerk |
| — | DF | (England) ENG | Paul Beesley (on loan from Manchester City) |
| — | MF | (England) ENG | Stacy Coldicott |
| — | DF | (England) ENG | Tony Dobson |
| — | FW | (Canada) CAN | Paul Peschisolido |
| — | DF | (England) ENG | Graham Potter |
| — | FW | (Republic of Ireland) IRL | Mickey Evans (Note: Evans was born in Plymouth, England, but also qualified to represent the Republic of Ireland internationally and made his international debut for the Republic of Ireland in October 1997.) |
| — | FW | (England) ENG | Franz Carr |
| — | FW | (Wales) WAL | James Thomas (on loan from Blackburn Rovers) |
| — | FW | (Saint Kitts and Nevis) SKN | Brian Quailey (Note: Quailey was born in Leicester, England, but also qualified to represent Saint Kitts and Nevis internationally and represented them at U-23 level.) |
| — | MF | (England) ENG | Dave Gilbert |
| — | MF | (England) ENG | Dean Bennett |
| — | FW | (England) ENG | Michael Rodosthenous |
| — | GK | (England) ENG | Neil Wypior |
