= 1998–99 West Bromwich Albion F.C. season =

West Bromwich Albion
1998–99 season
- Chairman: Tony Hale
- Manager: Denis Smith
- Stadium: The Hawthorns
- First Division: 12th
- FA Cup: Third round
- League Cup: First round
- Top goalscorer: League: Lee Hughes (31); All: Lee Hughes (32)
- Average home league attendance: 14,585

During the 1998–99 English football season, West Bromwich Albion competed in the Football League First Division.

== Season summary ==
In the 1998–99 season, local lad and lifetime fan Lee Hughes scored 31 times in the league to finish as top goalscorer across all four English divisions, but the Baggies finished only 12th and Smith was sacked in the summer of 1999.

== Final league table ==
Pos	Team	Pld	W	D	L	GF	GA	GD	Pts
10	Huddersfield Town	46	15	16	15	62	71	−9	61
11	Grimsby Town	46	17	10	19	40	52	−12	61
12	West Bromwich Albion	46	16	11	19	69	76	−7	59
13	Barnsley	46	14	17	15	59	56	+3	59
14	Crystal Palace	46	14	16	16	58	71	−13	58

Rules for classification: 1) Points; 2) Goals scored; 3) Goal difference

== Results ==
West Bromwich Albion's score comes first

=== Legend ===
Win	Draw	Loss

=== Football League First Division ===
Date	Opponent	Venue	Result	Attendance	Scorers
8 August 1998	Barnsley	A	2–2	18,114	Sneekes, Quinn
15 August 1998	Sheffield United	H	4–1	16,901	Carbon, Kilbane, Hughes (2)
22 August 1998	Port Vale	A	3–0	8,146	Hughes (3)
29 August 1998	Norwich City	H	2–0	17,401	de Freitas (2)
31 August 1998	Grimsby Town	A	1–5	7,931	Sneekes
8 September 1998	Bolton Wanderers	H	2–3	15,789	Flynn, Kilbane
13 September 1998	Bristol City	A	3–1	13,761	Hughes (2), Quinn
20 September 1998	Bradford City	H	0–2	12,426	
26 September 1998	Stockport County	A	2–2	8,804	Hughes (2)
29 September 1998	Oxford United	A	0–3	7,437	
4 October 1998	Watford	H	4–1	11,840	Kilbane, Hughes (2), de Freitas
18 October 1998	Sunderland	H	2–3	14,746	Hughes (2)
21 October 1998	Queens Park Rangers	H	2–0	11,842	Evans, Murphy
24 October 1998	Swindon Town	A	2–2	8,967	Hughes, Flynn
31 October 1998	Ipswich Town	A	0–2	15,568	
3 November 1998	Crystal Palace	H	3–2	11,606	Hughes (3, 1 pen)
7 November 1998	Birmingham City	H	1–3	19,472	Carbon
14 November 1998	Huddersfield Town	H	3–1	13,626	Hughes (3, 1 pen)
21 November 1998	Portsmouth	A	1–2	11,144	Hughes
29 November 1998	Wolverhampton Wanderers	H	2–0	22,682	Kilbane, Murphy
5 December 1998	Bury	A	0–2	5,007	
8 December 1998	Crewe Alexandra	A	1–1	5,007	Hughes (pen)
12 December 1998	Huddersfield Town	A	3–0	11,947	Quinn (2), Hughes
19 December 1998	Tranmere Rovers	H	0–2	13,966	
26 December 1998	Port Vale	H	3–2	14,929	Murphy, Bortolazzi, Hughes (pen)
28 December 1998	Crystal Palace	A	1–1	19,137	Hughes
9 January 1999	Barnsley	H	2–0	15,029	Murphy, Hughes
16 January 1999	Norwich City	A	1–1	15,411	Bortolazzi
23 January 1999	Watford	A	2–0	11,664	Sneekes, Angel
30 January 1999	Grimsby Town	H	1–1	17,843	Hughes
6 February 1999	Sheffield United	A	0–3	16,566	
13 February 1999	Bolton Wanderers	A	1–2	20,657	de Freitas
20 February 1999	Bristol City	H	2–2	16,490	Hughes (2)
27 February 1999	Bradford City	A	0–1	14,278	
2 March 1999	Stockport County	H	3–1	11,801	Kilbane, de Freitas, Hughes
6 March 1999	Oxford United	H	2–0	13,875	Quinn, Maresca
13 March 1999	Birmingham City	A	0–4	29,060	
20 March 1999	Ipswich Town	H	0–1	15,552	
3 April 1999	Sunderland	A	0–3	41,135	
5 April 1999	Crewe Alexandra	H	1–5	12,308	Sneekes
10 April 1999	Queens Park Rangers	A	1–2	11,158	Kilbane
13 April 1999	Swindon Town	H	1–1	9,601	Hughes
17 April 1999	Portsmouth	H	2–2	12,750	Maresca, Quinn
25 April 1999	Wolverhampton Wanderers	H	1–1	27,038	Evans
1 May 1999	Bury	H	1–0	12,918	de Freitas
9 May 1999	Tranmere Rovers	A	1–3	10,540	de Freitas

=== FA Cup ===
Round	Date	Opponent	Venue	Result	Attendance	Goalscorers
R3	2 January 1999	Bournemouth	A	0–1	10,881	

=== League Cup ===
Round	Date	Opponent	Venue	Result	Attendance	Goalscorers
R1 1st Leg	11 August 1998	Brentford	H	2–1	8,460	Evans, Hughes
R1 2nd Leg	18 August 1998	Brentford	A	0–3 (lost 2–4 on agg)	4,664	

== First-team squad ==
Squad at end of season

Note: Flags indicate national team as defined under FIFA eligibility rules; some limited exceptions apply. Players may hold more than one non-FIFA nationality.

No.	Pos.	Nation	Player
—	GK	ENG	Chris Adamson
—	GK	ENG	Alan Miller
—	GK	ENG	Phil Whitehead
—	GK	ENG	Neil Wypior
—	GK	ENG	Paul Brown
—	DF	ENG	Daryl Burgess
—	DF	ENG	Matt Carbon
—	DF	ENG	Paul Holmes
—	DF	ENG	Graham Potter
—	DF	ENG	Paul Raven
—	DF	WAL	Danny Gabbidon
—	DF	WAL	Paul Mardon (Note: Mardon was born in Bristol, England, but also qualified to represent Wales internationally and made his international debut for Wales in October 1995.)
—	DF	AUS	Andy McDermott
—	DF	AUS	Shaun Murphy
—	DF	AUS	Jason van Blerk

No.	Pos.	Nation	Player
—	MF	ENG	Sean Flynn
—	MF	IRL	Kevin Kilbane (Note: Kilbane was born in Preston, England, but also qualified to represent the Republic of Ireland internationally through his parents and represented them at U-21 level before making his international debut for Republic of Ireland in September 1997.)
—	MF	ITA	Mario Bortolazzi
—	MF	ITA	Enzo Maresca
—	MF	NED	Richard Sneekes
—	FW	ENG	Mark Angel
—	FW	ENG	Lee Hughes
—	FW	ENG	Adam Oliver
—	FW	ENG	Brian Quailey (Note: Quailey was born in Leicester, England, but also qualified to represent Saint Kitts and Nevis internationally and represented them at U-23 level.)
—	FW	ENG	Justin Richards
—	FW	NIR	James Quinn (Note: Quinn was born in Coventry, England, but also qualified to represent Northern Ireland internationally and made his international debut for Northern Ireland in 1996.)
—	FW	IRL	Mickey Evans (Note: Evans was born in Plymouth, England, but also qualified to represent the Republic of Ireland internationally and made his international debut for the Republic of Ireland in October 1997.)
—	FW	SUR	Fabian de Freitas
