= Mark Angel =

Mark Angel may refer to:

- Mark Angel (footballer) (born 1975), English footballer
- Mark Angel (comedian) (born 1991), Nigerian comedian, scriptwriter, and video producer
