= Daryl Burgess =

English footballer

Personal information
- Full name: Daryl Burgess
- Date of birth: 24 January 1971 (age 55)
- Place of birth: Birmingham, England
- Position: Defender

Youth career
- 1987–1989: West Bromwich Albion

Senior career*
Years	Team	Apps	(Gls)
1989–2001	West Bromwich Albion	332	(10)
2001–2003	Northampton Town	61	(2)
2003–2005	Rochdale	56	(0)
2005–2006	Kidderminster Harriers	34	(0)
2006–2008	Nuneaton Borough	29	(0)
2008	Bromsgrove Rovers	13	(0)
Total		525	(12)
- * Club domestic league appearances and goals

Daryl Burgess (born 24 January 1971 in Birmingham) is an English footballer who played for West Bromwich Albion, Northampton Town, AFC Rochdale, Kidderminster Harriers, Nuneaton Borough and Bromsgrove Rovers F.C., where he was also assistant manager.

== Career ==
Burgess began his career at West Bromwich Albion, where he made his debut during the 1989–90 season. He spent 14 years at WBA, and played nearly 400 first-team games for the Baggies, mostly as central defender or right-back. He was released by West Bromwich in 2001, and then joined Northampton Town.

In 2003, Burgess joined Rochdale on a free transfer. After two seasons at Rochdale, he moved back to the West Midlands to join Kidderminster Harriers of the Conference. He left Kidderminster at the end of the 2005–06 season and signed for Nuneaton Borough, and later joined Bromsgrove in January 2008.

In a 21-year playing career (1987–2008) Burgess amassed a grand total of 507 senior appearances for his 3 football league clubs plus another 50 for Kidderminster and he also played in 120 reserve and intermediate games for WBA.

== Coaching career ==
In 2008, Burgess started his own soccer school 'Total Football Premier Coaching' with his ex WBA teammate Richard Sneekes and also DJs at various venues around the country.

== Personal life ==
He is still living in Birmingham with his wife Catrina, daughters Olivia and Alannah.

== Career statistics ==
Appearances and goals by club, season and competition
Club	Season	League			FA Cup		League Cup		Other		Total	
Club	Season	Division	Apps	Goals	Apps	Goals	Apps	Goals	Apps	Goals	Apps	Goals
West Bromwich Albion	1996–97	First Division	33	1	0	0	1	0	—		34	1
West Bromwich Albion	1997–98	First Division	26	1	0	0	1	0	—		27	1
West Bromwich Albion	1998–99	First Division	20	0	0	0	1	0	—		21	0
West Bromwich Albion	1999–2000	First Division	26	1	1	0	3	0	—		30	1
West Bromwich Albion	2000–01	First Division	3	0	0	0	0	0	—		3	0
West Bromwich Albion	Total		108	3	1	0	6	0	0	0	115	3
Northampton Town	2001–02	Second Division	36	1	2	0	0	0	2 (Note: Appearances in Football League Trophy)	0	40	1
Northampton Town	2002–03	Second Division	25	1	2	0	1	0	1	0	29	1
Northampton Town	Total		61	2	4	0	1	0	3	0	69	2
Rochdale	2003–04	Third Division	35	0	2	0	1	0	0	0	38	0
Rochdale	2004–05	League Two	21	0	1	0	1	0	2	0	25	0
Rochdale	Total		56	0	3	0	2	0	2	0	63	0
Kidderminster Harriers	2005–06	Conference	34	0	1	0	—		3	0	38	0
Career total			259	5	9	0	9	0	8	0	285	5
