= Justin Richards (footballer) =

English footballer (born 1980)

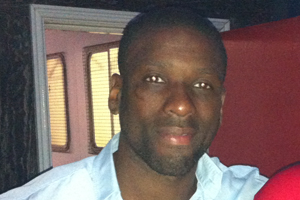
- Richards in 2013

Personal information
- Full name: Justin Donovan Richards
- Date of birth: 16 October 1980 (age 46)
- Place of birth: Sandwell, England
- Height: 1.83 m (6 ft 0 in)
- Position: Striker

Youth career
- 1997–1999: West Bromwich Albion

Senior career*
Years	Team	Apps	(Gls)
1999–2001	West Bromwich Albion	1	(0)
2001–2003	Bristol Rovers	16	(0)
2002	→ Colchester United (loan)	2	(0)
2002–2003	→ Stevenage Borough (loan)	13	(6)
2003–2004	Stevenage Borough	29	(3)
2004–2006	Woking	79	(35)
2006–2007	Peterborough United	13	(1)
2006	→ Grays Athletic (loan)	5	(0)
2007	→ Boston United (loan)	3	(0)
2007–2009	Kidderminster Harriers	65	(22)
2008	→ Oxford United (loan)	15	(1)
2009–2010	Cheltenham Town	44	(15)
2010–2011	Port Vale	42	(9)
2011–2013	Burton Albion	48	(12)
2013	→ Oxford United (loan)	2	(0)
2013	Oxford United	2	(0)
2013–2014	Tamworth	18	(1)
2014–2015	Sutton Coldfield Town		
2015–2017	Stourbridge		
2017–2018	Sutton Coldfield Town		
2018	Hednesford Town	0	(0)
2018	Rushall Olympic	8	(1)

International career
2006	England C	1	(1)
- * Club domestic league appearances and goals

Justin Donovan Richards (born 16 October 1980) is an English former footballer who played as a striker. He has a tally of around one goal every four games and has played mostly in the Conference and lower reaches of the English Football League. Something of a journeyman player, he has tended to play for teams in his local area around the Midlands and Southern England.

Richards started his career at West Bromwich Albion in 1997 but failed to establish himself at the club in four years. After two years with Bristol Rovers, he switched to Stevenage Borough. In 2004, he signed with Woking, and after a highly successful two years, he was snapped up by Peterborough United. In 2007, he joined Kidderminster Harriers, where he stayed for two years before he signed with Cheltenham Town. In the summer of 2010, he was signed to Port Vale before moving on to Burton Albion the following year and to Oxford United and then Tamworth in 2013. He signed with Sutton Coldfield Town in July 2014 and Stourbridge in September 2015, before returning to Sutton Coldfield Town in December 2017. The following summer, he joined Rushall Olympic via Hednesford Town. In addition to this, he has enjoyed six loan spells at Colchester United, Stevenage Borough, Grays Athletic, Boston United and Oxford United.

== Club career ==
Richards began his career at West Bromwich Albion, becoming an apprentice in July 1997 and becoming professional in 1999. He made his Albion debut as a substitute against Ipswich Town in March 1999, and made one further substitute appearance the following season before moving on to Ian Holloway's Bristol Rovers for £75,000 in January 2001. A week after signing him, Holloway left the club. Richards joined Colchester United on loan on 22 October 2002. He spent six weeks at Layer Road, making three substitute appearances for Steve Whitton's "U's". In three seasons with the "Pirates" he started just three games and could do little to prevent the club's relegation from the second to third tier in 2000–01. At the end of 2002 he joined non-League Stevenage Borough on loan, scoring six goals in 13 games, including a hat-trick against Farnborough Town.

Richards signed a permanent deal with Borough in March 2003. His high-scoring loan spell was not matched by a ratio of three goals in thirty games during his year-long injury-affected spell as a full-time Stevenage player. In May 2004 he moved on to Woking. His first season at the club was a moderate success with 14 goals. During the 2005–06 season, Richards was the second top scorer in the Conference with 22 goals in all competitions. This goalscoring record attracted the attention of League Two club Peterborough United.

Richards moved to Peterborough in June 2006 on a free transfer, signing a two-year deal. This came despite interest from Burton Albion manager Nigel Clough. He scored just one goal for Peterborough before being loaned out to Conference club Grays Athletic in November 2006, as part of a deal which saw Peterborough sign Gray's striker Aaron McLean. He was recalled by the "Posh" the next month. Despite continued interest from Nigel Clough, in January 2007 Richards joined Boston United, then in League Two, on a one-month loan.

At the end of the 2006–07 season, unwanted at 'Boro by Darren Ferguson, Richards dropped back out of the Football League, signing for Kidderminster Harriers on a free transfer. He was considered a big signing for the club. He scored six goals in 22 appearances in his opening season with the "Harriers". In January 2008, he joined Oxford United on loan until the end of the season. He managed just one goal in 15 appearances for the Oxfordshire club.

Richards returned to Kidderminster and decided to stay on at the club for the 2008–09 season. He enjoyed his second-most prolific season in the Conference, hitting 17 goals in all competitions. His shooting partner, and good friend, Matthew Barnes-Homer managed to top this tally with 19 goals.

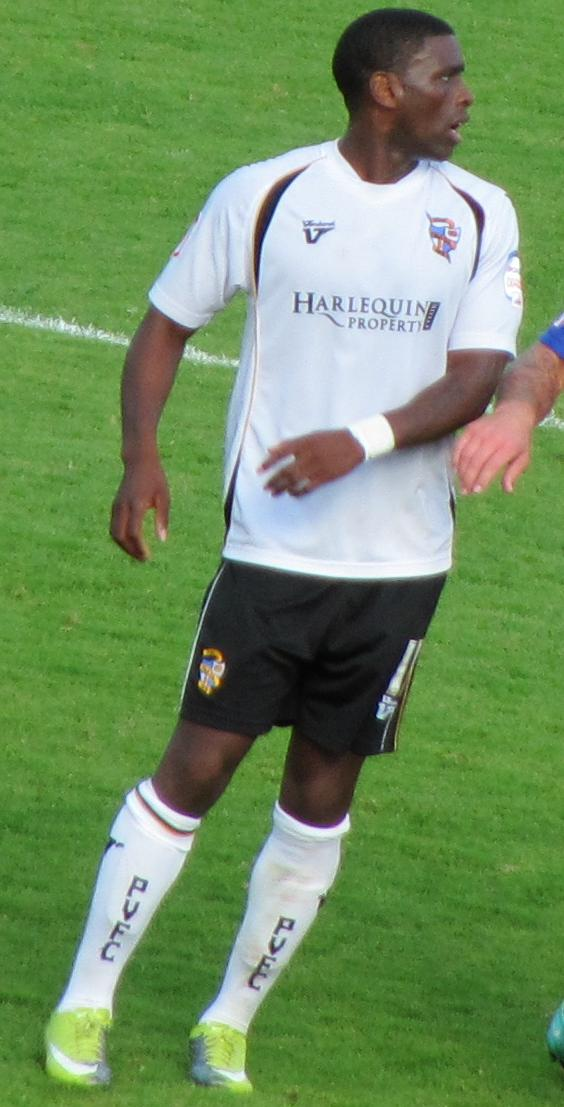
Richards in a September 2010 1–0 victory over Aldershot Town for Port Vale.

In June 2009, Richards signed a one-year contract with Cheltenham Town, making his second return to league football. He enjoyed a successful season in which he was the club's top scorer with 15 goals in 44 games. In summer 2010 Richards was offered a fresh contract at Cheltenham, but was also approached by League Two rivals Port Vale. In June 2010 Richards agreed terms with Port Vale.

"Even at 29, there's things I can improve him on, I've had a decent record working with centre-forwards. The way we play will suit him and he knows he's got to work hard."

— Micky Adams speaking to BBC Radio Stoke.

He settled in quickly at the club, building a partnership with his namesake Marc Richards in the 2010–11 pre-season, which continued into the league campaign. He quickly endeared himself to "Valiants" fans, scoring a brace in their 3–1 win at Championship side Queens Park Rangers in the League Cup first round. This was followed by a 13-game barren spell, which was ended by three goals in four games, including a strike that took the club into the third round of the FA Cup. The Richards duo's partnership was ended in January when Marc suffered a thigh injury; upon his recovery Justin was dropped to make way for loan striker Tom Pope. Richards scored his first hat-trick in the English Football League on 30 April, along with Louis Dodds, in a 7–2 win over Morecambe. In all he helped himself to 14 goals in fifty appearances that season, whilst his strike partner and namesake hit twenty goals in 46 games.

In July 2011, Richards signed a two-year contract with Vale's nearby League Two rivals Burton Albion after moving on a free transfer. Though the move came as a surprise to outside observers, Burton manager Paul Peschisolido said that "Justin is a player I admire and...I'm sure he'll bring us goals." Richards scored twice on his league debut, helping Burton earn a 2–2 draw at Torquay United on 6 August. After four games without a goal, he then went on a streak of six goals in five games, including a brace against Oxford United at the Kassam Stadium. Richards finished the 2011–12 campaign with 12 goals in 37 appearances.

Under the stewardship of Gary Rowett, Richards slipped behind Calvin Zola, Matt Paterson, and Billy Kee in a largely single-striker system in 2012–13. He returned to Chris Wilder's Oxford United on loan for a second time in January 2013; he was signed to provide cover for the suspended James Constable. He played three games for Oxford. Rowett released him from his contract at the Pirelli Stadium at the end of the month. He signed for Oxford on a deal until the end of the 2012–13 season on deadline day, 1 February 2013. However, after less than two weeks he was ruled out of action for the rest of the season after picking up a knee injury. He was one of 12 players released by manager Chris Wilder in May 2013.

In June 2013, Richards signed a contract with Tamworth to play for them in the Conference Premier for the forthcoming season; manager Dale Belford stated that securing his services was a "massive coup" for the "Lambs". He scored only one goal in 18 league appearances throughout the 2013–14 season, as the "Lambs" suffered relegation.

Neil Tooth, manager of Northern Premier League Division One South side Sutton Coldfield Town, signed Richards in July 2014. He finished as the "Royals" top-scorer in the 2014–15 season with 23 goals, helping the club to win promotion after beating Leek Town in the play-off final.

He moved on to Northern Premier League Premier Division rivals Stourbridge in September 2015. The club finished in sixth place in 2015–16, and qualified for the play-offs with a third-place finish in 2016–17 before losing 1–0 to Spennymoor Town in the play-off final. He rejoined Sutton Coldfield Town in December 2017. Town were relegated after they finished bottom of the Northern Premier League Premier Division at the end of the 2017–18 season. He went on to join Hednesford Town but left the club less than a month after it was confirmed they would not be placed in the Southern League Premier Division Central the following season. On 20 July 2018, he joined Rushall Olympic in the Southern League Premier Division Central. The "Pics" finished the 2018–19 season in eighth-place, with Richards scoring one goal in 12 games.

== International career ==
His success at Woking earned him a call-up to the England C team in May 2006. He scored in his only game, a 1–1 draw with Wales in the Four Nations Tournament at Priory Lane. His career as a semi-international was quickly ended once he joined Football League club Peterborough United later that year.

== Personal life ==
On 19 December 2010, Richards and four friends took part in a drunken brawl with another man during a night out in Leeds. The following year, he pleaded guilty to affray, and was fined £2,000 and given a community order with 100 hours unpaid work. Two of his friends were suspended prison sentences, while the other two were fined and given unpaid work. Judge James Spencer QC accepted that the men behaved out of character and were ashamed of their behaviour.

In June 2011 he was studying to complete a degree in Professional Sports Writing and Broadcasting at Staffordshire University, alongside former teammates Gareth Owen, Adam Yates, and Ritchie Sutton.

== Career statistics ==
Appearances and goals by club, season and competition
Club	Season	League			FA Cup		League Cup		Other		Total	
Club	Season	Division	Apps	Goals	Apps	Goals	Apps	Goals	Apps	Goals	Apps	Goals
West Bromwich Albion	1998–99	First Division	1	0	0	0	0	0	0	0	1	0
West Bromwich Albion	1999–2000	First Division	0	0	1	0	0	0	0	0	1	0
West Bromwich Albion	2000–01	First Division	0	0	0	0	0	0	0	0	0	0
West Bromwich Albion	Total		1	0	1	0	0	0	0	0	2	0
Bristol Rovers	2000–01	Second Division	7	0	0	0	0	0	1 (Note: Appearance(s) in the EFL Trophy.)	0	8	0
Bristol Rovers	2001–02	Third Division	1	0	0	0	0	0	0	0	1	0
Bristol Rovers	2002–03	Third Division	8	0	0	0	0	0	0	0	8	0
Bristol Rovers	Total		16	0	0	0	0	0	1	0	17	0
Colchester United (loan)	2002–03	Second Division	2	0	0	0	—		1	0	3	0
Stevenage Borough	2002–03	Conference	19	6	0	0	—		0	0	19	6
Stevenage Borough	2003–04	Conference	23	3	0	0	—		1	0	24	3
Stevenage Borough	Total		42	9	0	0	0	0	1	0	43	9
Woking	2004–05	Conference	41	14	1	0	0	0	2 (Note: 1 appearance in the Football League Trophy and 1 appearance in the FA Trophy.)	0	44	14
Woking	2005–06	Conference	38	21	4	0	0	0	3 (Note: 2 appearances in the Football League Trophy and 1 appearance in the FA Trophy.)	1	45	22
Woking	Total		79	35	5	0	0	0	5	1	89	36
Peterborough United	2006–07	League Two	13	1	0	0	2	0	1	0	16	1
Grays Athletic (loan)	2006–07	Conference	5	0	0	0	—		0	0	5	0
Boston United (loan)	2006–07	League Two	3	0	—		—		—		3	0
Kidderminster Harriers	2007–08	Conference	26	6	2	0	—		0	0	28	6
Kidderminster Harriers	2008–09	Conference	39	16	2	1	—		1 (Note: Appearance(s) in the FA Trophy.)	0	42	17
Kidderminster Harriers	Total		65	22	4	1	0	0	1	0	70	23
Oxford United (loan)	2007–08	Conference	15	1	—		—		—		15	1
Cheltenham Town	2009–10	League Two	44	15	1	0	1	0	1	0	47	15
Port Vale	2010–11	League Two	42	9	4	2	2	2	2	1	50	14
Burton Albion	2011–12	League Two	35	11	0	0	1	0	1	1	37	12
Burton Albion	2012–13	League Two	13	1	0	0	1	0	1	0	15	1
Burton Albion	Total		48	12	0	0	2	0	2	1	52	13
Oxford United	2012–13	League Two	4	0	1	0	—		0	0	5	0
Tamworth	2013–14	Conference Premier	18	1	2	0	—		0	0	20	1
Rushall Olympic	2018–19	Southern League; Premier Division Central	8	1	0	0	—		4	0	12	1
Career total (Note: Statistics for Sutton Coldfield Town and Stourbridge not recorded.)			405	106	18	3	7	2	19	3	449	114

== Honours ==
Woking

- Football League Trophy runner-up: 2005–06

Sutton Coldfield Town

- Northern Premier League Division One South play-offs: 2014–15
