= Lee Hughes =

English footballer (born 1976)

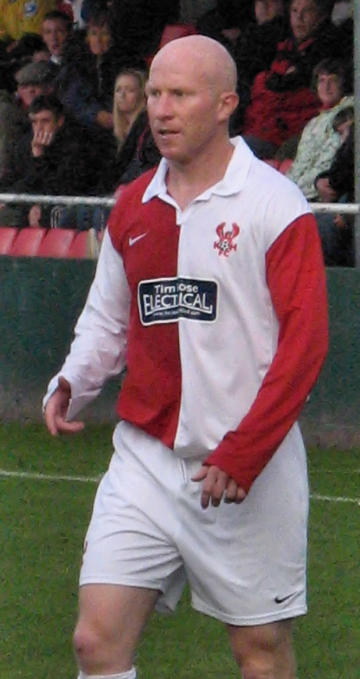
- Hughes playing for Kidderminster Harriers in 2009

Personal information
- Full name: Lee Hughes
- Date of birth: 22 May 1976 (age 50)
- Place of birth: Smethwick, England
- Height: 6 ft 0 in (1.83 m)
- Position: Striker

Youth career
- 1987–1991: West Bromwich Albion
- 1991–1994: Kidderminster Harriers

Senior career*
Years	Team	Apps	(Gls)
1994–1997	Kidderminster Harriers	139	(70)
1997–2001	West Bromwich Albion	156	(80)
2001–2002	Coventry City	42	(15)
2002–2004	West Bromwich Albion	55	(11)
2007–2009	Oldham Athletic	55	(25)
2009	→ Blackpool (loan)	3	(1)
2009–2013	Notts County	128	(59)
2013–2014	Port Vale	31	(13)
2014–2015	Forest Green Rovers	42	(15)
2015	Kidderminster Harriers	13	(3)
2015	Ilkeston		
2015–2017	Worcester City	48	(28)
2017	AFC Telford United	13	(4)
2017–2018	Worcester City	13	(10)
2018–2019	Halesowen Town		
2019–2020	Mickleover Sports	19	(6)
2020	Grantham Town	6	(1)
2020	Nuneaton Borough	0	(0)
2021	Cradley Town	1	(1)
2021–2022	Stourport Swifts	19	(4)
Total		781	(344)

International career
1996	England Semi-Pro	1	(0)

Managerial career
- 2017–2018: Worcester City
- 2019: Halesowen Town (caretaker)
- * Club domestic league appearances and goals

Lee Hughes (born 22 May 1976) is an English former professional footballer. A strong striker with excellent finishing abilities, Hughes represented the England semi-professional team once in 1996. After being released as a youth team footballer, Hughes worked as a roofer alongside his father. He started his career in the Conference with Kidderminster Harriers before winning a £380,000 move to boyhood club West Bromwich Albion in August 1997. He finished as the club's top-scorer for four seasons running, earning a place on the PFA Team of the Year in 1998–99 after finishing as the highest scorer in the top four divisions of English football. He was sold to Coventry City for £5 million in August 2001 before returning to West Brom for half of that figure twelve months later. He failed to impress in the Premier League as Albion suffered relegation but helped the club to make an immediate return to the top flight as runners-up in the First Division in 2003–04.

In August 2004, he was sentenced to six years' imprisonment for causing death by dangerous driving following a fatal crash on 23 November 2003. Following his release from prison in 2007, he returned to the professional game with Oldham Athletic of League One. He signed for Notts County in July 2009 and was named on the PFA Team of the Year after scoring 30 league goals as the club won the League Two title in 2009–10. He left Notts County to sign for Port Vale in January 2013 and helped the club to secure promotion out of League Two in 2012–13. In January 2014, he signed for Forest Green Rovers on an 18-month deal. In January 2015, he returned to Kidderminster Harriers and moved on to Ilkeston and then Worcester City in the summer. He became a prolific goalscorer into his 40s and signed with AFC Telford United in February 2017. He began his management career as joint-manager of Worcester City, alongside John Snape, in May 2017. In March 2018, he joined Halesowen Town as a player, where he remained until moving on to Mickleover Sports in August 2019. He later played for Grantham Town, Nuneaton Borough, Cradley Town and Stourport Swifts.

== Club career ==
=== Kidderminster Harriers ===
Hughes spent four years at West Bromwich Albion as a schoolboy from ages 11 to 15, though he was not offered a youth team contract. He then had unsuccessful trials at numerous clubs, though came close to being offered a contract by Swansea City. He instead started his career playing semi-professionally for Conference club Kidderminster Harriers, whilst holding down a part-time job as a roofer. Although Hughes scored 34 goals in the 1996–97 season, Kidderminster failed to gain promotion to the Football League after finishing five points behind champions Macclesfield Town. At this point in his career Hughes was regarded as one of England's finest semi-professionals and was called up to the England national football C team. In total, Hughes scored 70 goals in 139 games for Kidderminster in all competitions. He also played for amateur touring side Middlesex Wanderers during their tour of Vietnam whilst he was aged 19.

=== West Bromwich Albion ===
Hughes was sold to West Bromwich Albion for an initial £200,000 – incentives later took the final sum up to £380,000 – in August 1997. He said "It was a dream to join the team I have supported all my life". The Daily Mirror printed that "Hughes has red hair, tattoos of a Tasmanian devil and a British bulldog on his forearms, dynamite in his boots and Albion in his blood." Fans affectionately nicknamed him the "Ginger Ninja".

He made his debut at The Hawthorns as a substitute in a 2–1 win over Tranmere Rovers on 9 August 1997. Seven days later he scored two goals from the bench in a 3–2 win over Crewe Alexandra at Gresty Road. Though signed by Ray Harford, he came to the fore under new boss Denis Smith. Smith handed Hughes his first start on 28 December, in a 1–1 home draw with Stoke City. He finished his debut season as the club's top-scorer with 14 goals in 41 appearances and was rewarded with a new four-year contract.

He started the 1998–99 season in fine form, and claimed his first ever hat-trick in a 3–0 win over Port Vale at Vale Park on 22 August. Despite having recently signed a long-term contract, his form and goal record led to constant rumours of a big money move to a host of Premier League clubs. West Brom eventually issued a "hands-off" warning to other clubs. He claimed further hat-tricks against Crystal Palace and Huddersfield Town, and finished the season with 32 goals in 45 games. This tally left him as the country's top-scorer. He was named on the PFA Team of the Year for the First Division. He then submitted a written transfer request, and his spokesman told the press that there have "been a number of things going on behind the scenes which have unsettled him recently". In particular, his £1,400 a week salary was compared with the £5,000 a week salary of under-performing teammate Fabian de Freitas.

He remained at the club for the 1999–2000 season and scored 17 goals in 43 appearances. Albion struggled in the First Division under new manager Brian Little, though improved after Gary Megson replaced Little as manager in March and avoided relegation despite Hughes missing the final five matches of the season due to a knee injury.

He was partnered with Jason Roberts for the 2000–01 season; the pair went on to score 40 goals between them to help secure the "Baggies" a play-off place. With 23 goals to his name, he again attracted interest from other clubs. He claimed two hat-tricks in seven days against Gillingham and Preston North End. Hughes converted a penalty in a 2–2 draw with Bolton Wanderers in the first leg of the play-off semi-final before a 3–0 defeat at the Reebok Stadium ended Albion's play-off hopes. He refused to sign a new contract in July 2001, and was placed on the transfer list.

=== Coventry City ===
Hughes was sold to Gordon Strachan's Coventry City for a club record transfer fee of £5,000,001 (the unusual figure was because any offer exceeding £5 million would trigger an escape clause in his West Brom contract) in August 2001. His wages at Highfield Road were reported to be £15,000 a week. Hughes scored 14 goals in 40 games, including a hat-trick in a 6–1 win at Crewe Alexandra, and finished the 2001–02 season as the club's top-scorer. Coventry rejected a loan offer from West Bromwich Albion in March 2002, and ended the season outside the play-offs.

=== Return to West Bromwich Albion ===
In August 2002, Hughes returned to West Bromwich Albion for a club record £2.5 million – half the fee Albion had received for him a year earlier – and signed a four-year deal with the club. Despite being a regular in the first-team, Hughes failed to score a single Premier League goal in the 2002–03 season and Albion were relegated in 19th place with just six wins and 26 points from 38 matches. Hughes was criticised by several teammates following the club's 1–0 defeat by Everton at Goodison Park, though was publicly backed by manager Gary Megson. He told the press that "I want to establish myself in the Premiership and any accusations of me not pulling my weight should be made to my face." He put his poor form down to him missing pre-season training with injury problems. He rediscovered his form back in the First Division, scoring 12 goals in 36 games in 2003–04 as West Brom secured promotion with a second-place finish. His contract at West Bromwich Albion was immediately terminated in August 2004, following his conviction for causing death by dangerous driving. He spent the next three years in prison, serving half his six-year sentence.

=== Oldham Athletic ===
Upon his release from prison on 20 August 2007, Hughes signed a two-year contract with League One club Oldham Athletic; the club asked supporters "not to pass moral judgement". His reported salary of £1,800-a-week at Boundary Park was less than a tenth of what he earned at the peak of his career with West Bromwich Albion. Hughes made his debut for Oldham in a 4–1 defeat by Hartlepool United at Victoria Park on 1 September 2007. He failed to find the net in his first seven games, and underwent an operation to correct a hernia problem. He recovered quickly from the procedure and registered his first two goals for the Latics in a 3–0 win over AFC Bournemouth at Dean Court on 25 November, before being named in the "League One Team of the Week". He scored his first hat-trick for the club against Millwall in a 3–2 victory at The Den on 15 December, and again made the "League One Team of the Week". He picked up a groin injury in March 2008, and was sidelined for the rest of the season. Hughes had scored eight goals by the end of the 2007–08 season, making him the club's second-highest goalscorer behind Craig Davies.

He opened his account for the 2008–09 season with a hat-trick in a 4–0 win over Cheltenham Town on 23 August. Stating his future ambitions as playing Championship football with Oldham, he was offered a new deal at the club on 30 December 2008. He was linked with a move to Doncaster Rovers in January 2009, but stayed put after talks with manager John Sheridan, who insisted Hughes was "very happy" at Oldham. In March 2009, it was widely reported that Hughes had been involved in a drunken brawl with Sheridan where Hughes was reported to have had him "in a headlock". Sheridan later downplayed the incident as "jovial", saying, "people have made things up". Sheridan was sacked, but insisted that the two incidents were not related, as "it was results that cost me the job".

On 26 March 2009, Hughes joined Championship club Blackpool on loan until the end of the season. He made his debut in a 1–0 defeat to Plymouth Argyle at Bloomfield Road on 4 April. His first goal for the club came on 18 April against Charlton Athletic at the Valley, when after coming on as an 89th-minute substitute, and with Blackpool 2–1 down, he scored four minutes later to make the score 2–2. Hughes ended the campaign as Oldham's highest scorer with 18 goals in 40 appearances. However, he was one of several players released by the club's new manager Dave Penney in May 2009, and returned to Kidderminster Harriers for training to keep up his fitness levels whilst searching for a new club.

=== Notts County ===
Hughes signed for League Two team Notts County on a two-year contract on 22 July 2009, on the same day that Sven-Göran Eriksson arrived at the club as director of football. He scored a hat-trick on his debut in a 5–0 victory over Bradford City on the opening day of the season. He then got his second hat-trick against Northampton Town in a 5–2 home win on 12 September. He claimed his third hat-trick of the campaign on 28 December during a 4–1 win over Burton Albion at the Pirelli Stadium. However, the club endured a turbulent time, with manager Ian McParland sacked and replaced by Hans Backe, who himself resigned after Qadbak Investments proved unable to fund Backe's wages. New owner Ray Trew appointed Steve Cotterill as manager. County entered April ten points behind league leaders Rochdale, though Hughes remained confident they could reduce the deficit and win the league. On 17 April, Hughes scored two goals in a 4–1 victory over Morecambe as County won promotion to League One. He was named as League Two's Player of the Month in April. On 1 May, Hughes added another two goals in County's final home game of the season, making him the first Notts player to score 30 league goals since Tommy Lawton in the 1949–50 season. He finished as the division's top-scorer in 2009–10 with 30 league goals in 39 games, and was named on the PFA Team of the Year alongside teammates Kasper Schmeichel and Ben Davies. County won the league by a ten-point margin. In July 2010, Hughes signed a one-year extension to his contract that would see him at Meadow Lane until the summer of 2012.

On 23 September 2010, Hughes revealed a 'Boing, Boing' t-shirt in a League Cup tie with Wolverhampton Wanderers at Molineux – the slogan of Wolves' rivals West Bromwich Albion – and was quizzed by police after angry Wolves fans retaliated to the message by attacking Notts County supporters' coaches. He was reported to be "angry" at being named as a substitute in a league game against Milton Keynes Dons on 11 December, though boss Paul Ince stated that "Hughesy is 34 and cannot play week in week out. But he's never come and said, 'I should be starting'. He's been different class." On 8 January 2011, he was on the scoresheet as County beat Premier League side Sunderland 2–1 in the FA Cup. Two weeks later he was confirmed to be a target of Sheffield Wednesday. He remained with the "Magpies", and ended the 2010–11 season as the club's top-scorer with 16 goals in 37 appearances. The club again went through a succession of managers – Craig Short, Paul Ince and then Martin Allen – and ended the season three points above the relegation zone.

On 8 September 2011, he played against Italian club Juventus in the inaugural game of the Juventus Stadium, and scored County's goal in a 1–1 draw; after the game he had a signed shirt from Andrea Pirlo. The next month he accepted a pay cut to sign a new 18-month contract, and was quoted as saying he never planned to leave the club as "the fans have taken me in and I love it here". He ended the 2011–12 campaign on 11 goals in 44 games. In summer 2012, the club rejected offers for Hughes from Cheltenham Town and former club Oldham Athletic.

At the beginning of the 2012–13 season, new manager Keith Curle stated that "we know he is of an age where he won't be playing for 46 games, so he needs to be managed". New signing Yoann Arquin became the county's first choice striker, and Hughes announced his intention to leave the club to find first-team football. He was reported to have joined Port Vale on loan, with a view to a permanent move, on 22 November 2012; though the deal had yet to be ratified by the English Football League. However, the next day it was revealed that the loan move would not go through as the relevant paperwork had not been sent in on time. Three weeks later Hughes provided the club with a sick note, saying that he was unavailable until January. His contract was terminated by mutual consent on 7 January 2013.

=== Port Vale ===
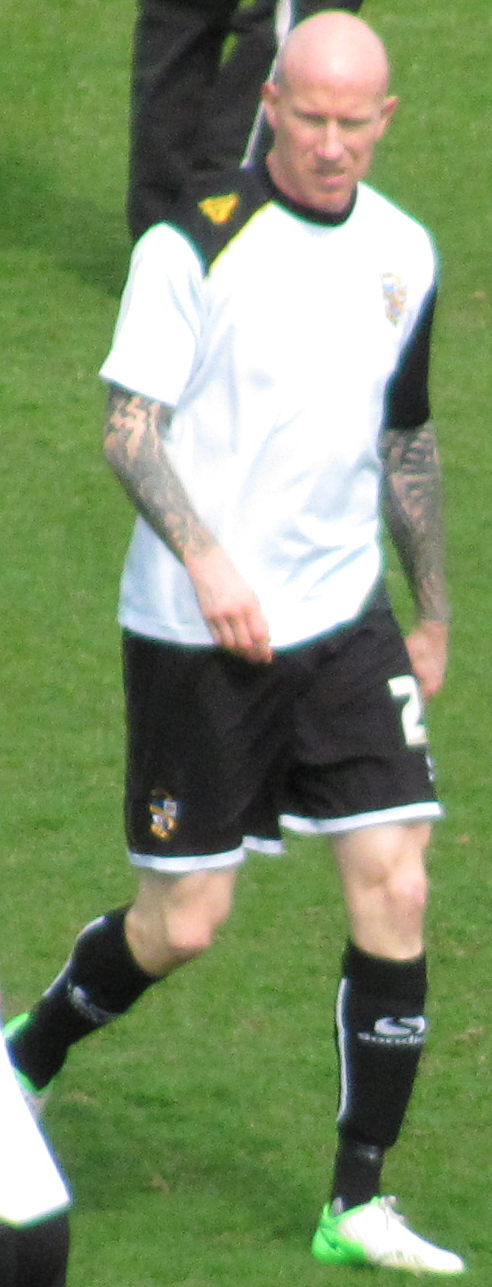
Hughes pictured during the 2–2 draw between Port Vale and Northampton Town on 20 April 2013

Hughes joined Port Vale the day after securing his exit from Notts County, as the BBC reported that "promotion-chasing boss Micky Adams wants to bring him in to add impetus to a Vale attack who have occasionally misfired this term". He signed a contract to keep him at Vale Park until the end of the 2012–13 season, at which point his contract would be extended by 12 months if the "Valiants" were promoted. However, Hughes later revealed that Adams was against the transfer but had been overruled by chairman Norman Smurthwaite. He marked his debut against the "Gills" with the winning goal that sent Vale to the top of the table. Being partnered with the country's leading goalscorer Tom Pope allowed Hughes space in front of goal vacated by opposition defenders attempting to double up on Pope. Hughes scored his first hat-trick for the "Valiants" in a 7–1 home victory over Burton Albion on 5 April, with two of his goals coming from the penalty spot as he took over from Jennison Myrie-Williams as the club's penalty taker. This performance won him a place on the League Two team of the week. Vale were promoted at the end of the season, with Hughes scoring ten goals in his 18 games, ensuring his contract was extended until summer 2014.

He was not a regular starter in the 2013–14 season, especially as Jordan Hugill began to impress from the youth development squad. So he decided to leave the club in the January transfer window.

=== Later career ===
On 3 January 2014, he joined Conference Premier side Forest Green Rovers on an 18-month contract. Manager Adrian Pennock stated that "He's come to play football, he's not come for money and I'm chuffed to have him on board. He has the experience we need and I believe he'll score goals." He made his debut six days later in a 1–1 draw with Hereford United at The New Lawn. On 25 January, he scored his first goals for the club, securing a brace in a 3–0 home win over Chester. He ended the 2013–14 season with eight goals in 21 appearances for Rovers.

On the opening day of the 2014–15 season, Hughes scored Forest Green's winning goal in a 1–0 away victory at Southport. He then scored his 300th career goal with his second strike of the season in a 2–0 win over Alfreton Town at The New Lawn on 16 August 2014.

On 30 January 2015, Hughes returned to Conference Premier club Kidderminster Harriers on a deal till the end of the season after having his contract with Forest Green Rovers mutually terminated. On his 'second debut' for Kidderminster, he put his side ahead in a Worcestershire Senior Cup tie against Stourbridge. He also scored on his league return against Woking at Aggborough, scoring in the 39th minute in a 1–1 draw. He was released at the end of the season as manager Gary Whild's playing budget was reduced by half for the 2015–16 campaign.

After impressing in pre season, Hughes signed for Northern Premier League Premier Division side Ilkeston, and was sent off on his debut against Skelmersdale United on 15 August 2015.

In September 2015, Hughes signed for Worcester City on non-contract terms, who played at Aggborough, the home of Kidderminster Harriers, where he started his career. He scored 19 goals in 29 appearances in the 2015–16 campaign. In February 2017, he applied to succeed Carl Heeley as manager. However, he instead left the financially troubled club and moved on to National League North rivals AFC Telford United.

In March 2018, Hughes signed as a player for Northern Premier League Premier Division side Halesowen Town. The "Yeltz" ended the 2017–18 season in 23rd-place, before being relegated out of the Southern League Premier Division Central at the end of the 2018–19 campaign. He left Halesowen in August 2019, after losing his place in the starting eleven. Later that month he joined league rivals Mickleover Sports, where he made 19 league appearances and scored six goals, and then Grantham Town in January 2020, where he scored once in six league appearances.

He was reported to have been a target for Nuneaton Borough just before the 2019–20 season was formally abandoned on 26 March, with all results from the season being expunged, due to the COVID-19 pandemic in England. Hughes also ended up signing with Nuneaton in March 2020, before he announced his retirement a month later, at the age of 43. In October 2021, having made one scoring appearance for Cradley Town, Hughes appeared on the team-list for Stourport Swifts. He remained with the club until the end of the 2021–22 season, scoring four goals in 19 league appearances.

== Managerial career ==
Hughes rejoined Worcester City as both a player and as joint-manager, alongside John Snape, on 4 May 2017; Worcester had just been relegated out of the National League North. He resigned on 6 March 2018. In March 2019, he was appointed caretaker player-manager of Halesowen Town, remaining in the role until May.

== Style of play ==
Describing Hughes's attributes in January 2013, former Notts County coach Dave Kevan said that he was a "fantastic finisher... a clever player whose movement is good, whose intelligence is good, who uses his body well and who uses his strength well... he plays with his brain and he's adapted his game as he has got older... he's also clever enough to create opportunities for others". He maintained a "natural goalscoring instinct" throughout his career, and has said "I always fancy myself to stick the ball in the back of the net if I get a chance". His dancing goal celebration originated as a mocking tribute of a friend's bad dancing.

== Personal life ==
The son of Bill and Gail Hughes, older brother to Clint and Brett, Hughes worked with his father as a roofer in his home-town of Smethwick before turning professional. In 1999, Sharlene Gillies claimed that she and Hughes had a child together. DNA tests later proved that he was not the father, though by this time his engagement to lap dancer Donna Nisbet was called off. Hughes stated that "I don't think Donna was particularly happy with all the limelight that comes with football", though insisted that barracking from opposition fans only made him more determined to put in a good performance on the pitch. Hughes and Jason Roberts were questioned by police over allegations that they assaulted a man outside a pub in Brierley Hill; the case was dropped in September 2000. It was reported that he had converted to Islam during his time in prison, due in part to his friendship with Muslim prisoners and the fact that abuse of alcohol had helped to bring about his downfall – his father said that "this story is not true." In 2005 Hughes was reported to be on suicide watch after learning that his wife had reportedly been seeing a younger man.

He married air hostess Anna Kuzmanic in June 2000 in the Croatian town of Trogir. The couple had two children together but split up in 2008; the split was described as "very amicable". His eldest, Mia, was born in November 2000. Hughes was declared bankrupt in March 2018.

=== Causing death by dangerous driving conviction ===
On 23 November 2003, near his home in the Warwickshire village of Meriden, West Midlands, Hughes lost control of his Mercedes CL55 AMG and went onto the wrong side of the road before colliding with a Renault Scénic. A passenger in the Renault, Douglas Graham, was killed in the incident, whilst Douglas Graham's wife Maureen and the driver Albert Frisby were severely injured. Hughes and passenger Adrian Smith left the scene before turning themselves into the police 36 hours later. He was arrested on suspicion of causing death by dangerous driving. He denied the charge, though later pleaded guilty to charges of failing to stop and failing to report an accident.

During his trial at Coventry Crown Court, Hughes was accused of driving too fast in wet conditions and was described as driving "like a madman". He claimed the brakes on his car had locked, though tests showed that the brakes were in perfect working order and had technology installed to prevent the driver from losing control. When asked where he had been in the 36 hours after leaving the scene of the incident Hughes said that "I would rather not say, really", though later admitted he had travelled 20 miles (32 km) to Smethwick. Prosecutor Melbourne Inman QC told the court Hughes had fled the scene to dodge a breath test. On 9 August 2004, Hughes was found guilty of causing death by dangerous driving, and was sentenced to six years imprisonment. Frisby said that the sentence was not long enough. Hughes lodged an appeal against the sentence, but not the conviction. In January 2005, his appeal for his sentence to be reduced was refused.

He served in Category C prisons. During his time in HM Prison Featherstone he played in the Staffordshire County Senior League for the prison football team. He also helped to organise a charity football match which raised £5,000 for a children's hospice. He was released in August 2007, three years into his six-year sentence.

"After today I do not intend to discuss or make comment about the events which led to my imprisonment. I have made this decision, not out of protection for myself, but with regard to the privacy and respect for the families involved. I made dreadful mistakes and decisions that will live with me for the rest of my life. It also greatly affected my immediate family, including my wife and children, and I will never forgive myself for this."

— Hughes issued a public apology upon his release from prison, though Albert Frisby stated that "He has no remorse. To me, he is very arrogant and ignorant. I've just got no time for the fellow."

=== Assault conviction ===
On 3 December 2011, Hughes was arrested and bailed on charges of sexual assault after an incident in Croydon. He was then charged with the offence on 30 January 2012. In May 2012, Hughes was found guilty of common assault and fined £500, but the charge of sexual assault was dropped.

== Career statistics ==
Appearances and goals by club, season and competition
Club	Season	League			FA Cup		League Cup		Other		Total	
Club	Season	Division	Apps	Goals	Apps	Goals	Apps	Goals	Apps	Goals	Apps	Goals
Kidderminster Harriers total			139	70	0	0	0	0	0	0	139	70
West Bromwich Albion	1997–98	First Division	37	14	2	0	2	0	—		41	14
West Bromwich Albion	1998–99	First Division	42	31	1	0	2	1	—		45	32
West Bromwich Albion	1999–2000	First Division	36	13	2	1	5	3	—		43	17
West Bromwich Albion	2000–01	First Division	41	22	1	1	4	0	2 (Note: Appearance(s) in the play-offs.)	1	48	23
West Bromwich Albion	Total		156	80	6	2	13	4	2	1	177	87
Coventry City	2001–02	First Division	38	14	0	0	2	0	—		40	14
Coventry City	2002–03	First Division	4	1	0	0	0	0	—		4	1
Coventry City	Total		42	15	0	0	2	0	0	0	44	15
West Bromwich Albion	2002–03	Premier League	23	0	0	0	1	1	—		24	1
West Bromwich Albion	2003–04	First Division	32	11	0	0	4	1	—		36	12
West Bromwich Albion	Total		55	11	0	0	5	2	0	0	60	13
Oldham Athletic	2007–08	League One	18	7	3	1	0	0	0	0	21	8
Oldham Athletic	2008–09	League One	37	18	0	0	2	0	1 (Note: Appearance(s) in the EFL Trophy.)	0	40	18
Oldham Athletic	Total		55	25	3	1	2	0	1	0	61	26
Blackpool (loan)	2008–09	Championship	3	1	—		—		—		3	1
Notts County	2009–10	League Two	39	30	5	3	1	0	0	0	45	33
Notts County	2010–11	League One	31	13	5	2	1	1	0	0	37	16
Notts County	2011–12	League One	40	10	2	0	1	1	1	0	44	11
Notts County	2012–13	League One	18	6	0	0	1	0	1	0	20	6
Notts County	Total		128	59	12	5	4	2	2	0	146	66
Port Vale	2012–13	League Two	18	10	—		—		—		18	10
Port Vale	2013–14	League One	13	3	1	0	1	0	1	0	16	3
Port Vale	Total		31	13	1	0	1	0	1	0	34	13
Forest Green Rovers	2013–14	Conference Premier	21	8	—		—		—		21	8
Forest Green Rovers	2014–15	Conference Premier	19	5	1	0	—		0	0	20	5
Forest Green Rovers	Total		40	13	1	0	0	0	0	0	41	13
Kidderminster Harriers	2014–15	Conference Premier	13	3	—		—		—		13	3
Worcester City	2015–16	National League North	28	15	0	0	—		1 (Note: Appearance(s) in the FA Trophy.)	1	29	16
Worcester City	2016–17	National League North	20	13	0	0	—		0	0	20	13
Worcester City	Total		48	28	0	0	0	0	1	1	49	29
AFC Telford United	2016–17	National League North	13	4	—		—		—		13	4
Worcester City	2017–18	Midland League; Premier Division	13	10	1	0	—		2	1	16	11
Mickleover Sports	2019–20	Northern Premier League; Premier Division	19	6	0	0	—		3 (Note: 1 appearance in the FA Trophy and 2 appearances in the Northern Premier League Challenge Cup.)	0	22	6
Grantham Town	2019–20	Northern Premier League; Premier Division	6	1	0	0	—		0	0	6	1
Nuneaton Borough	2019–20	Southern League; Premier Division Central	0	0	0	0	—		0	0	0	0
Cradley Town	2021–22	Midland League; Division One	1	1	0	0	—		0	0	1	1
Stourport Swifts	2021–22	Midland League; Premier Division	19	4	0	0	—		0	0	19	4
Career total (Note: Statistics for Ilkeston and Halesowen Town not recorded.)			781	344	24	8	27	8	12	3	844	363

== Honours ==
Notts County

- Football League Two: 2009–10

Individual

- PFA Team of the Year: 1998–99 First Division, 2009–10 League Two
- West Bromwich Albion Player of the Year: 1998–99
- Football League Two Player of the Month: April 2010
