= Neil Clement =

English footballer

Personal information
- Full name: Neil Clement
- Date of birth: 3 October 1978 (age 48)
- Place of birth: Reading, England
- Height: 6 ft 0 in (1.83 m)
- Position: Defender

Youth career
- ?–1996: Chelsea

Senior career*
Years	Team	Apps	(Gls)
1996–2000	Chelsea	1	(0)
1998–1999	→ Reading (loan)	11	(1)
1999	→ Preston North End (loan)	4	(0)
1999–2000	→ Brentford (loan)	8	(0)
2000	→ West Bromwich Albion (loan)	8	(0)
2000–2010	West Bromwich Albion	256	(21)
2008	→ Hull City (loan)	5	(0)
Total		293	(22)

International career
1994–1995	England U16	8	(0)
1996	England U18	3	(0)
- * Club domestic league appearances and goals

Neil Clement (born 3 October 1978) is an English former professional footballer who spent the majority of his career playing for West Bromwich Albion.

He participated in a club record three promotions. His customary position was in defence, but he was also a versatile player who occupied several different positions for Albion. He was also known as a set piece specialist, having scored several goals from free-kicks and penalties. Later in his career, Clement was affected by knee injuries and was forced to retire in January 2010.

== Football career ==
=== Early career ===
The younger son of Dave Clement, the former QPR and England full-back of the 1970s, Neil Clement was born in Reading, Berkshire but later attended Dorridge Junior School and Arden School in the West Midlands. His brother is football coach Paul Clement. As a teenager, Clement obtained a place at The Football Association's School of Excellence at Lilleshall. He had played as a centre-forward up until the age of 14, and only switched to left-back to improve his chances of getting into Lilleshall. He started his career at Chelsea, making his professional début in a 3–1 Premier League win over West Ham on 21 December 1996. This was to be his only league appearance and only start for Chelsea. He failed to make a single appearance during 1997–98, and the following season his contribution to Chelsea was restricted to just two substitute appearances in the League Cup. To gain first team experience, Clement was loaned out to Reading in November 1998, making his début in a 1–0 win at Northampton on 21 November 1998. A week later, on 28 November, he scored his first goal in professional football as Reading beat Lincoln 2–1. He remained with Reading until February 1999, but the following month started another loan spell, this time at Preston North End. He was sent off on his North End début in a 1–0 defeat to Colchester on 2 April 1999.

In 1999–2000, Clement continued to struggle in his attempt to break into the Chelsea first team. In November 1999 he was loaned out to Brentford, making his début in a 4–1 defeat to AFC Bournemouth on 23 November. He returned to Chelsea in January 2000, making one further substitute appearance as the Blues beat Gillingham 5–0 in an FA Cup quarter-final in February.

=== West Bromwich Albion ===
On transfer deadline day in March 2000, Clement joined West Bromwich Albion on loan for the rest of the season, making his Albion début in a 2–1 defeat to Manchester City at Maine Road on 25 March. His performances in Albion's successful attempt to avoid relegation from Division One earned him a permanent transfer in July, in a move costing £150,000.

Clement scored his first goal for his new club in a 2–1 first leg win in the League Cup away at Derby County on 19 September 2000. He also scored in the second leg a week later, but Albion lost the tie 5–4 on aggregate. His first league goal for the Baggies came in a 3–2 Hawthorns defeat to Norwich City on 14 October 2000. In all, Clement appeared 52 times for Albion in 2000–01, missing just one game in all competitions and winning the club's Player of the Season award. Albion reached the promotion play-offs, losing in the semi-final to Bolton Wanderers. Clement was again a key player for Albion during 2001–02. As well as converting penalties in Albion's FA Cup victories against Premiership sides Sunderland and Leicester, Clement scored a stunning free kick to equalise in a 1-1 draw against Black Country rivals Wolves, and he missed only one league game as Albion won promotion to the top flight. His efforts were recognised when he was named in the PFA Division One team of the year.

Clement featured heavily once more in 2002–03, missing only two games all season, and although Albion were relegated, he played his part in a second promotion in 2003–04. He scored in successive games at the start of the 2004–05 Premiership season, netting against both Blackburn and Aston Villa. In January 2005 Clement signed a new five-and-a-half-year contract, which would keep him at The Hawthorns until 2010. His teammate Darren Moore credited him with playing a key role in Albion's revival during that season, as the team successfully avoided relegation, and Clement also won the West Bromwich Albion Disabled Supporters Club Player of the Year award. Clement's goal in a 4–0 win against Everton on 19 November 2005 gave him the distinction of being the only Albion player to score in each of the club's first three Premiership seasons, although Albion's 2005–06 campaign ended in relegation. In 2006–07 he played in less than half of West Brom's fixtures and was sent off twice. He came on as an 81st-minute substitute in that season's Championship play-off final at Wembley Stadium, as Albion lost 1–0 to Derby County.

At the end of February 2008, Clement joined Hull City on loan, and made his debut for the Tigers in a 2–1 defeat away at Bristol City. The loan was scheduled to last for the remainder of the season, but Albion exercised an option to recall him to the Hawthorns after 28 days to help their push for promotion. Clement returned to the Albion first team, playing in the final nine games of the season and making his 300th appearance for the club against Queens Park Rangers on the final day of the season. Albion won the match 2–0 and were promoted as champions; Clement thus became the first player to win three promotions with Albion.

Clement was ruled out for the entire 2008–09 season following a new knee injury sustained in Albion's final pre-season match, against Real Mallorca. The injury forced him to announce his retirement from playing football on 6 January 2010.

== Horse racing ban ==
In December 2012 Clement, a racehorse owner, and five other men were charged with serious breaches of the rules of racing by the British Horseracing Authority. The charges related to using inside information to place bets, breaching the rules by backing against his own horse Hindu Kush, and failing to provide requested details to the BHA.

On 22 May 2013, Clement was found guilty of conspiring to commit a corrupt or fraudulent practice, placing a lay bet on a horse which he then owned and failure to provide phone records to the inquiry. He received a BHA ban of fifteen years.

== Personal life ==
Clement is married to Rebecca and they have two daughters together, His father was the late England player and QPR legend Dave Clement.

== Career statistics ==
Appearances and goals by club, season and competition
Club	Season	League			FA Cup		League Cup		Other		Total	
Club	Season	Division	Apps	Goals	Apps	Goals	Apps	Goals	Apps	Goals	Apps	Goals
Chelsea	1996–97	Premier League	1	0	0	0	0	0	0	0	1	0
Chelsea	1997–98	Premier League	0	0	0	0	0	0	0	0	0	0
Chelsea	1998–99	Premier League	0	0	0	0	2	0	0	0	2	0
Chelsea	1999–2000	Premier League	0	0	1	0	0	0	0	0	1	0
Chelsea	Total		1	0	1	0	2	0	0	0	4	0
Reading (loan)	1998–99	Second Division	11	1	0	0	0	0	1 (Note: Appearances in Football League Trophy)	0	12	1
Preston North End (loan)	1998–99	Second Division	4	0	0	0	0	0	0	0	4	0
Brentford (loan)	1999–2000	Second Division	8	0	0	0	0	0	—		8	0
West Bromwich Albion (loan)	1999–2000	First Division	8	0	0	0	0	0	—		8	0
West Bromwich Albion	2000–01	First Division	45	5	1	0	4	2	2 (Note: Appearances in Championship / First Division play-offs)	0	52	7
West Bromwich Albion	2001–02	First Division	45	6	4	2	3	0	—		52	8
West Bromwich Albion	2002–03	Premier League	36	3	2	0	1	0	—		39	3
West Bromwich Albion	2003–04	First Division	35	2	1	0	5	1	—		41	3
West Bromwich Albion	2004–05	Premier League	35	3	3	0	0	0	—		38	3
West Bromwich Albion	2005–06	Premier League	31	1	0	0	3	0	—		34	1
West Bromwich Albion	2006–07	Championship	20	1	4	0	0	0	1	0	25	1
West Bromwich Albion	2007–08	Championship	9	0	1	0	1	0	—		11	0
West Bromwich Albion	2008–09	Premier League	0	0	0	0	0	0	—		0	0
West Bromwich Albion	2009–10	Championship	0	0	0	0	0	0	—		0	0
West Bromwich Albion	Total		256	21	16	2	17	3	3	0	292	26
Hull City (loan)	2007–08	Championship	5	0	0	0	0	0	—		5	0
Career total			293	22	17	2	19	3	4	0	333	27

== Honours ==
Individual

- PFA Team of the Year: 2001–02 First Division
