= Adam Oliver (footballer) =

English footballer

Personal information
- Date of birth: 25 October 1980 (age 45)
- Place of birth: West Bromwich, England
- Height: 1.75 m (5 ft 9 in)
- Position: Midfielder

Youth career
- West Bromwich Albion

Senior career*
Years	Team	Apps	(Gls)
1998–2001	West Bromwich Albion	23	(1)

International career
1999	England U20	1	(0)
- * Club domestic league appearances and goals

Adam Oliver (born 25 October 1980) is an English former professional footballer who played as a midfielder.

== Career ==
Born in West Bromwich, Oliver made 23 appearances in the Football League for West Bromwich Albion, scoring one goal, his strike coming in a dramatic 4–4 draw with Bolton Wanderers in April 2000. He made a further four appearances in Cup competitions. After recovering from life-threatening kidney disease, Oliver retired at the age of 21 following recurring knee injuries.

Oliver made one appearance at the 1999 FIFA World Youth Championship.

== Career statistics ==
Appearances and goals by club, season and competition
Club	Season	League			FA Cup		League Cup		Other		Total	
Club	Season	Division	Apps	Goals	Apps	Goals	Apps	Goals	Apps	Goals	Apps	Goals
West Bromwich Albion	1998–99	First Division	1	0	0	0	1	0	0	0	2	0
West Bromwich Albion	1999–00	First Division	15	1	1	0	0	0	0	0	16	1
West Bromwich Albion	2000–01	First Division	7	0	0	0	2	0	0	0	9	0
Career total			23	1	1	0	3	0	0	0	27	1
