= Alan Miller (footballer) =

English footballer (1970–2021)

Personal information
- Full name: Alan John Miller
- Date of birth: 29 March 1970
- Place of birth: Epping, England
- Date of death: 3 June 2021 (aged 51)
- Place of death: Holkham, England
- Height: 6 ft 3 in (1.91 m)
- Position: Goalkeeper

Youth career
- 1984–1988: Arsenal

Senior career*
Years	Team	Apps	(Gls)
1988–1994	Arsenal	8	(0)
1988–1989	→ Plymouth Argyle (loan)	13	(0)
1991	→ West Bromwich Albion (loan)	3	(0)
1991–1992	→ Birmingham City (loan)	15	(0)
1994–1997	Middlesbrough	57	(0)
1997	→ Huddersfield Town (loan)	0	(0)
1997	→ Grimsby Town (loan)	3	(0)
1997	→ West Bromwich Albion (loan)	5	(0)
1997–2000	West Bromwich Albion	93	(0)
2000–2003	Blackburn Rovers	1	(0)
2000	→ Bristol City (loan)	4	(0)
2000	→ Coventry City (loan)	1	(0)
2001–2002	→ St Johnstone (loan)	18	(0)
Total		221	(0)

International career
1985	England schoolboys	2	(0)
1985–1986	England U16	9	(0)
1988–1990	England U21	4	(0)
- * Club domestic league appearances and goals

Alan John Miller (29 March 1970 – 3 June 2021) was an English professional footballer who played as a goalkeeper.

He played in the Premier League for Arsenal, Middlesbrough and Coventry City, but made most appearances for West Bromwich Albion, with 108 First Division appearances over two spells. He also played in the Football League for Plymouth Argyle, Birmingham City, Grimsby Town, Bristol City and Blackburn Rovers, as well as in the Scottish Premier League for St Johnstone. He represented England at schoolboy, under-16 and under-21 levels.

== Life and career ==
Alan John Miller was born on 29 March 1970 in Epping, Essex, and attended Epping Forest High School at nearby Loughton. He was selected for the Football Association's School of Excellence at Lilleshall as an Arsenal-associated schoolboy in 1984, and was capped by England at schoolboy and under-16 level. He signed for Arsenal as a trainee ahead of the 1986–87 season, and was a member of their FA Youth Cup-winning team of 1988. He made four appearances for the England under-21 team.

He turned professional in 1988, but with John Lukic and then David Seaman on the staff, first-team opportunities were rare. He had loan spells with Plymouth Argyle, West Bromwich Albion and Birmingham City, whom he helped gain promotion from the Third Division in 1991–92. He finally made his Arsenal debut on 21 November 1992 away to Leeds United, replacing the injured Seaman to become the first Arsenal goalkeeper to come on as a substitute, and made another seven appearances over the next two seasons. He won FA Cup and League Cup winners' medals in 1992–93 and a European Cup Winners' Cup medal in 1993–94, each time as an unused substitute.

In August 1994, wanting first-team football, Miller signed for Middlesbrough; a Football League tribunal set the fee at an initial £325,000, plus £100,000 in the event of his 50th appearance. winning a First Division winners' medal in his first season. However, he lost his place to Gary Walsh through injury in September 1995 and played only three more Premiership matches that season. After beginning the 1996–97 season as first choice, Miller was one of several players made available for transfer in October to raise funds to strengthen the struggling Middlesbrough defence.

After spells on loan at Huddersfield Town and Grimsby Town, and following the arrival of goalkeeper Mark Schwarzer at Middlesbrough, Miller joined West Bromwich Albion in February 1997, initially on loan. The move was made permanent for a £500,000 fee just before the transfer deadline. He was undisputed first choice for his first full season, and his performances earned him the club's Player of the Year award and inclusion in the First Division PFA Team of the Year.

Despite complications from a hernia operation that meant he missed pre-season, Miller was a regular in the side until a succession of minor injuries combined with the performances of stand-in Phil Whitehead kept him out for the second half of the 1998–99 season, and was transfer-listed ahead of the 1999–2000 season. Nevertheless, he began the season as first choice, and played until the end of the year, but contract talks came to nothing, and in February 2000, he moved on.

Miller joined First Division rivals Blackburn Rovers on a three-and-a-half-year contract; the initial £50,000 fee could rise to £70,000 depending on appearances. He made only two, against Sheffield United in the league and Portsmouth in the League Cup. He went on loan to Bristol City and Coventry City during 2000–01. His only appearance for Coventry was as a substitute against Chelsea after Chris Kirkland was sent off with the score goalless; Coventry lost 6–1. In October 2001, he was loaned to Scottish Premiership club St Johnstone, where he played regularly until being recalled as back-up to Brad Friedel because of injury to the regular second-choice goalkeeper Alan Kelly ahead of the 2002 Football League Cup final, which Blackburn won. Miller retired from football in 2003 after failing to overcome a back injury.

Miller later lived in Holkham, Norfolk, where he worked as business development manager at Holkham Hall. He died at Holkham on 3 June 2021, aged 51.

== Career statistics ==
Appearances and goals by club, season and competition
Club	Season	League			National cup (Note: Includes FA Cup and Scottish Cup)		League cup (Note: Includes Football League Cup and Scottish League Cup)		Other		Total	
Club	Season	Division	Apps	Goals	Apps	Goals	Apps	Goals	Apps	Goals	Apps	Goals
Arsenal	1988–89	First Division	0	0	0	0	0	0	—		0	0
Arsenal	1989–90	First Division	0	0	0	0	0	0	0	0	0	0
Arsenal	1990–91	First Division	0	0	0	0	0	0	—		0	0
Arsenal	1991–92	First Division	0	0	0	0	0	0	0	0	0	0
Arsenal	1992–93	Premier League	4	0	0	0	0	0	—		4	0
Arsenal	1993–94	Premier League	4	0	0	0	0	0	0	0	4	0
Arsenal	Total		8	0	0	0	0	0	0	0	8	0
Plymouth Argyle (loan)	1988–89	Second Division	13	0	2	0	—		—		15	0
West Bromwich Albion (loan)	1991–92	Third Division	3	0	—		0	0	—		3	0
Birmingham City (loan)	1991–92	Third Division	15	0	0	0	0	0	1 (Note: Appearance in Associate Members' Cup)	0	16	0
Middlesbrough	1994–95	First Division	41	0	2	0	1	0	2 (Note: Appearance in Anglo-Italian Cup)	0	46	0
Middlesbrough	1995–96	Premier League	6	0	0	0	0	0	—		6	0
Middlesbrough	1996–97	Premier League	10	0	0	0	2	0	—		12	0
Middlesbrough	Total		57	0	2	0	3	0	2	0	64	0
Huddersfield Town	1996–97	First Division	0	0	—		—		—		0	0
Grimsby Town	1996–97	First Division	3	0	—		—		—		3	0
West Bromwich Albion	1996–97	First Division (Note: The first five appearances were made while on loan from Middlesbrough.)	12	0	—		—		—		12	0
West Bromwich Albion	1997–98	First Division	41	0	2	0	4	0	—		47	0
West Bromwich Albion	1998–99	First Division	20	0	0	0	1	0	—		21	0
West Bromwich Albion	1999–2000	First Division	25	0	1	0	4	0	—		30	0
West Bromwich Albion	Total		98	0	3	0	9	0	—		110	0
Blackburn Rovers	1999–2000	First Division	1	0	—		—		—		1	0
Blackburn Rovers	2000–01	First Division	0	0	0	0	1	0	—		1	0
Blackburn Rovers	2001–02	Premier League	0	0	0	0	0	0	—		0	0
Blackburn Rovers	2001–02	Premier League	0	0	0	0	0	0	—		0	0
Blackburn Rovers	Total		1	0	0	0	1	0	—		2	0
Bristol City (loan)	2000–01	Second Division	4	0	—		0	0	—		4	0
Coventry City (loan)	2000–01	Premier League	1	0	—		0	0	—		1	0
St Johnstone (loan)	2001–02	Scottish Premier League	18	0	1	0	—		—		19	0
Career total			221	0	8	0	13	0	3	0	245	0

== Honours ==
Arsenal Youth

- FA Youth Cup: 1987–88

Arsenal

- FA Cup: 1992–93
- Football League Cup: 1992–93
- FA Charity Shield: 1991 (shared)
- European Cup Winners' Cup: 1993–94

Middlesbrough

- Football League First Division: 1994–95

Blackburn Rovers

- Football League Cup: 2001–02

Individual

- PFA Team of the Year: 1997–98 First Division

== Sources ==
- Matthews, Tony (2010). Birmingham City: The Complete Record. Derby: DB Publishing. ISBN 978-1-85983-853-2.
