= Jordão (footballer, born 1971) =

Portuguese footballer

Personal information
- Full name: Adelino José Martins Batista
- Date of birth: 30 August 1971 (age 55)
- Place of birth: Malanje, Angola
- Height: 1.90 m (6 ft 3 in)
- Position: Midfielder

Youth career
- 1985–1987: Real Massamá
- 1987–1990: Estrela Amadora

Senior career*
Years	Team	Apps	(Gls)
1990–1997	Estrela Amadora	81	(7)
1993–1994	→ Campomaiorense (loan)	9	(0)
1994–1995	→ Leça (loan)	26	(3)
1997	Benfica	6	(0)
1998–2000	Braga	66	(2)
2000–2003	West Bromwich Albion	63	(6)
2004–2007	Estrela Amadora	38	(0)
Total		289	(18)

International career
1992	Portugal U21	1	(0)
- * Club domestic league appearances and goals

Adelino José Martins Batista (born 30 August 1971), known as Jordão, is a Portuguese former footballer who played as a defensive midfielder.

== Club career ==
Born in Malanje, Portuguese Angola, Jordão made his professional debut in 1990 for Lisbon-based Estrela Amadora, but it took several years for him to become an important first-team member, also being loaned twice, to Campomaiorense and Leça, both in the second division (he also did not manage to appear regularly for the former).

After two solid seasons at Estrela, Jordão joined Primeira Liga club Benfica, but was soon deemed surplus to requirements following the arrival of Graeme Souness as manager, and moved to fellow league team Braga in January 1998, where he would spend an additional two campaigns.

In August 2000, having already played one league match for Braga, Jordão joined English side West Bromwich Albion for a transfer fee of £350,000, and made his debut in the same month against Barnsley. In 2001–02, he scored one of his five league goals (a career-best) in the Black Country derby win against Wolverhampton Wanderers at Molineux, helping Albion to achieve automatic promotion to the Premier League.

After 71 appearances across all competitions – only three in the top flight – and eight goals for WBA, Jordão was released in the summer of 2003, re-joining Estrela da Amadora in January of the following year and playing sparingly until his retirement three years later.
