= Matthew Turner (footballer, born 1981) =

English footballer

Personal information
- Date of birth: 29 December 1981 (age 44)
- Place of birth: Nottingham, England
- Positions: Winger; forward

Youth career
- 1999–2001: Nottingham Forest

Senior career*
Years	Team	Apps	(Gls)
2001–2003	West Bromwich Albion	0	(0)
2003–2004	Herfølge	?	(?)
2004–2005	Hednesford Town	28	(1)
2005	Eastwood Town	5	(2)
2005	Ilkeston Town	3	(0)
2006	Gedling Town	?	(?)
2006	Carlton Town	?	(?)

International career
	England U16	?	(?)
	England U18	?	(?)
- * Club domestic league appearances and goals

Matthew Turner (born 29 December 1981) is an English former football striker and wide midfielder. He retired from his footballing career in 2006, and now works as a Mental Performance Coach.

Born in Nottingham, Turner started his career at Nottingham Forest as a youngster. He earned promising reviews in the youth team at Forest, and West Bromwich Albion signed him in 2000. At West Brom he was unable to break into the first team, so he was initially loaned out to Danish club Herfølge in April 2002; he impressed during his time at the club, and the move was made permanent. In 2004, he returned to England, joining Hednesford Town, but left the club towards the end of the 2004–05 season and joined Eastwood Town. He moved on to Ilkeston Town and Gedling Town, before signing for Carlton Town in October 2006.

Turner represented England at under-16 and under-18 level.
