= Brian Quailey =

Footballer (born 1978)

Personal information
- Date of birth: 21 March 1978 (age 48)
- Place of birth: Leicester, England
- Height: 1.83 m (6 ft 0 in)
- Position: Striker

Senior career*
Years	Team	Apps	(Gls)
- Nuneaton Borough
1997–2000	West Bromwich Albion	7	(0)
1998–1999	→ Exeter City (loan)	12	(2)
1999–2000	→ Blackpool (loan)	1	(0)
2000–2002	Scunthorpe United	70	(16)
2002	Doncaster Rovers	2	(0)
2002–2003	Halifax Town	33	(4)
2003	Nuneaton Borough		
2003–2004	Tamworth	17	(0)
2004–2005	Stevenage Borough	10	(2)
2005	→ Nuneaton Borough (loan)		
2005–2006	Nuneaton Borough		
2006–2007	Stafford Rangers	11	(0)
2008	Nuneaton Town		
Total		163	(24)

International career
- Saint Kitts and Nevis U23
- * Club domestic league appearances and goals

Brian Quailey (born 21 March 1978) is a retired professional footballer who played as a striker. Born in England, he represented the Saint Kitts and Nevis U23 national team internationally.

== Club career ==
Born in Leicester, Quailey played for Nuneaton Borough, West Bromwich Albion, Exeter City, Blackpool, Scunthorpe United, Doncaster Rovers, Halifax Town, Tamworth, Stevenage Borough and Stafford Rangers.

At the end of the 2001–02 season he was offered a new contract by Scunthorpe United in April 2002, but was released by the club in July 2002. He had an unsuccessful trial at Rushden & Diamonds later that month, before signing for Doncaster Rovers on non-contract terms in August 2002. He signed for Halifax Town on non-contract terms in September 2002, leaving them in May 2003 after signing a two-year contract with Nuneaton Borough. He then moved to Tamworth in November 2003, before signing for Stevenage Borough in April 2004. After spending a loan spell at Nuneaton Borough, he signed permanently for the club in March 2005. He moved to Stafford Rangers in July 2006. After another spell at Nuneaton in October 2008, he was linked with a transfer to Atherstone Town in December 2008.

== International career ==
Quailey played for Saint Kitts and Nevis at under-23 level.
