= Mark Angel (footballer) =

English footballer

Personal information
- Date of birth: 23 August 1975 (age 51)
- Place of birth: Newcastle-upon-Tyne, England
- Height: 5 ft 10 in (1.78 m)
- Position: Left winger

Senior career*
Years	Team	Apps	(Gls)
?–1993	Walker Central		
1993–1995	Sunderland	0	(0)
1995–1998	Oxford United	85	(6)
1998–2000	West Bromwich Albion	25	(1)
2000–2001	Darlington	5	
2001	Queen of the South	5	(1)
2001–2004	Boston United	54	(6)
2004–2005	King's Lynn	39	(5)
2005	→ Cambridge United (loan)	8	(1)
2005–2006	→ Stamford (loan)		
2006	→ Wisbech Town (loan)		
2006–2007	Diss Town		
2007–2008	Mildenhall Town		
2008	Newmarket Town		
2008	Bourne Town		
2008–2009	Spalding United		

International career
2002	England C	3	(0)

Managerial career
- 2015–2016: Boston Town
- * Club domestic league appearances and goals

Mark Angel (born 23 August 1975) is an English former professional footballer who played in the Football League for Boston United, Darlington, Oxford United, Sunderland and West Bromwich Albion. He also played for Scottish side as the Queen of the South. He later played non-League football for King's Lynn, Cambridge United, Stamford, Wisbech Town, Diss Town, Mildenhall Town, Newmarket Town, Bourne Town and Spalding United.

On 20 May 2015 he was appointed as manager of United Counties League side Boston Town, but left the club in February 2016.
