= Elliott Morris (footballer) =

Irish footballer

Personal information
- Full name: Elliott John Morris
- Date of birth: 4 May 1981 (age 45)
- Place of birth: Belfast, Northern Ireland
- Position: Goalkeeper

Youth career
- –1999: Crusaders

Senior career*
Years	Team	Apps	(Gls)
1999–2002	West Bromwich Albion	0	(0)
2000	→ Doncaster Rovers (loan)	0	(0)
2002–2022	Glentoran	618	(1)

International career
2003	Northern Ireland U21	1	(0)
- * Club domestic league appearances and goals

Elliott Morris (born 4 May 1981) is a Northern Irish former goalkeeper.

Elliott played for Glentoran for twenty years, making his debut in 2002. Elliott Morris also represented Northern Ireland at "B" level and Under 21 level.

== Early life ==
Growing up, Morris was a Crusaders fan who lived on the Shore Road, North Belfast, near Seaview with his parents Isobel and Gareth and his three brothers Reece, Bowden and Gareth.

== Club career ==
=== Before Glentoran ===
Before joining Glentoran, Elliott had spells with Crusaders, West Brom and Doncaster Rovers, failing to make a senior appearance at all 3 clubs. He did however make 1 appearance for West Brom academy in a 0–0 FA Youth Cup final v Scunthorpe in April 2000, saving 2 penalties and scoring 1 in a shootout which was the last goal ever scored for West Brom at Wembley Stadium before Salomon Rondon scored for West Brom in a Premier League game against Tottenham in November 2017.

=== Glentoran ===
He started his Glentoran career in 2002, after signing from West Brom and has won several trophies in the process, he became the most capped Glentoran goalkeeper in a 3–0 win over Warrenpoint at the Oval on 7 November 2013. On 12 January 2019 Morris scored against Institute from inside his own half on his 723rd appearance for Glentoran.

== International career ==
Morris has represented Northern Ireland at "B" level and Under 21 level.
