= Chris Adamson =

British footballer

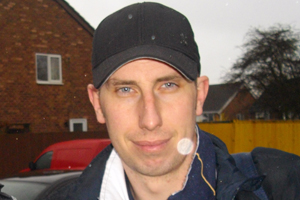

Personal information
- Full name: Christopher Adamson
- Date of birth: 4 November 1978 (age 47)
- Place of birth: Ashington, England
- Position: Goalkeeper

Team information
- Current team: Mansfield Town (goalkeeping coach)

Youth career
- 1995–1997: West Bromwich Albion

Senior career*
Years	Team	Apps	(Gls)
1997–2003	West Bromwich Albion	12	(0)
1999	→ IK Brage (loan)	?	(0)
1999	→ Mansfield Town (loan)	2	(0)
1999	→ Halifax Town (loan)	8	(0)
2002	→ Plymouth Argyle (loan)	1	(0)
2002–2003	→ Halesowen Town (loan)	1	(0)
2003–2005	St Patrick's Athletic	66	(0)
2005	Solihull Borough	0	(0)
2005–2007	Sheffield Wednesday	12	(0)
2007–2008	Stockport County	0	(0)
2008	→ Northwich Victoria (loan)	0	(0)
2008–2009	Ilkeston Town	32	(0)
2009–2010	Hereford United	1	(0)
2022-	Lane Head	62	(1)
Total		135	(0)

Managerial career
- 2010–: Mansfield Town (goalkeeping coach)
- 2014–: Bustleholme (coach)
- * Club domestic league appearances and goals

Christopher Adamson (born 4 November 1978) is an English former football goalkeeper who played for 13 clubs in a 13-year career. Adamson is currently goalkeeping coach at Mansfield Town, and plays for Midland Football League Division Two side Lane Head.

== Career ==
=== Early career ===
Adamson joined West Bromwich Albion as an apprentice in April 1995, turning professional in July 1997; he made his Albion début away at Stockport County on 11 April 1998. He generally found it difficult to break into the Albion first team, and remained an understudy to more experienced keepers such as Alan Miller, Brian Jensen and Russell Hoult. Adamson spent time on loan at various clubs, including IK Brage in Sweden, Mansfield Town, Halifax Town, Plymouth Argyle and Halesowen Town. Adamson then signed for League of Ireland side St Patrick's Athletic. In 2003, he was nominated for the League of Ireland 'Goalkeeper of the Year'.

=== Sheffield Wednesday ===
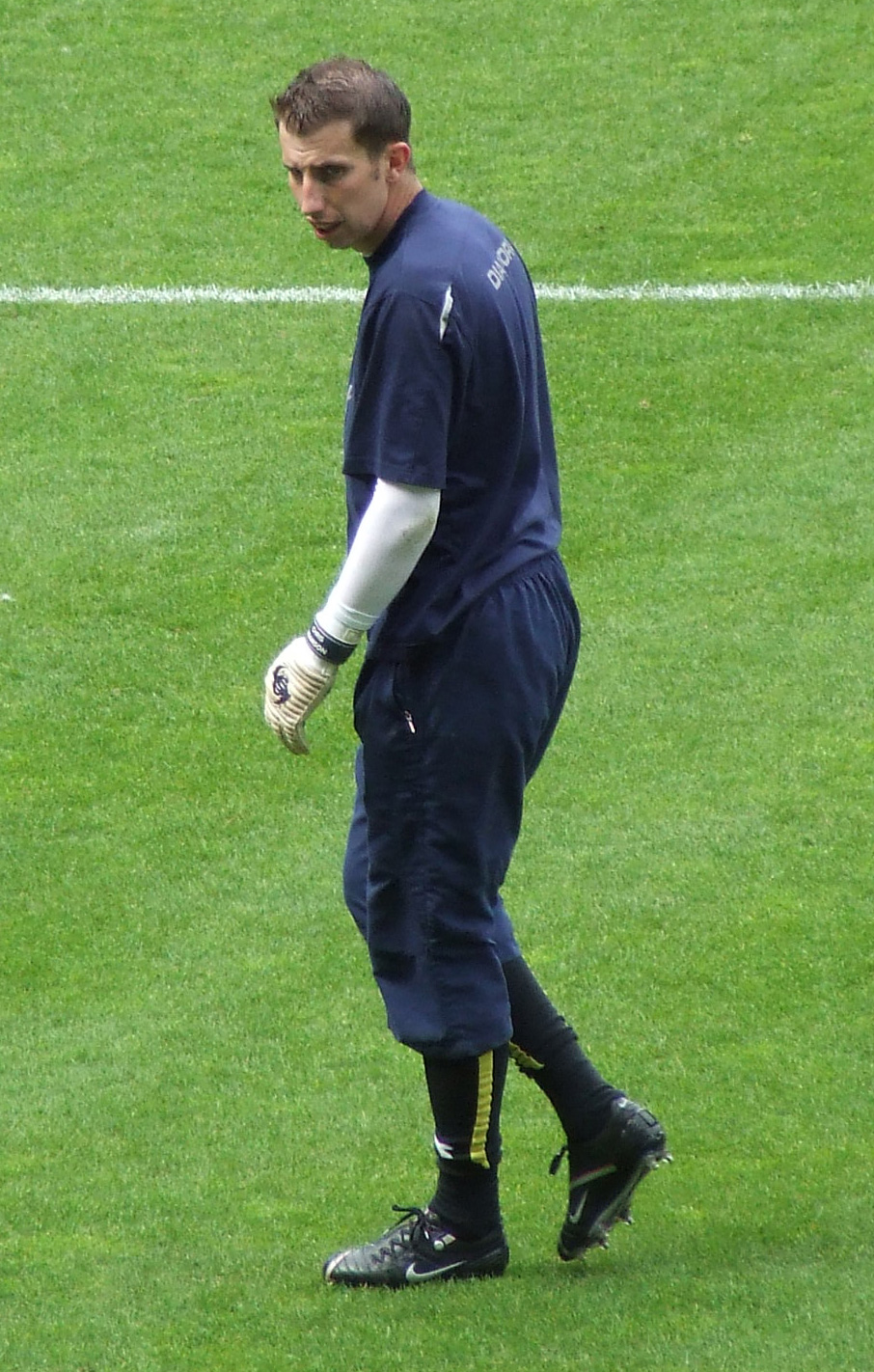
Adamson at Sheffield Wednesday

On his return from Ireland, Adamson had a brief spell at Southern League Premier Division club Solihull Borough, before joining Sheffield Wednesday in January 2005. It was the second time that he had been signed by Wednesday manager Paul Sturrock, having played under him during his loan spell at Plymouth. Adamson made his Sheffield Wednesday debut as an 8th-minute substitute on 12 March 2005 at home versus Blackpool in Football League One, helping to secure a 3–2 win. He was released on a free transfer following the Owls' promotion to the Championship at the end of the season. However, Sturrock was unsuccessful in finding a replacement back-up goalkeeper to then first choice David Lucas and Adamson re-signed for Wednesday on 11 July 2005.

Adamson made five appearances for the Owls in the 2005–06 season, keeping a clean sheet versus Crystal Palace at Hillsborough as well as keeping goal in the Steel City derby after the long-term injury to David Lucas. He lost his place in the side following the arrival of England U21 keeper Scott Carson on loan from Liverpool. Chris did however captain the Sheffield Wednesday reserve team to the title in the Pontins Central Reserve League.

Adamson warmed the Wednesday bench for sometime longer after former Owls boss Paul Sturrock secured the services of Australian Brad Jones from Middlesbrough on a three-month loan deal at the beginning of the 2006–07 season. Chris made his first appearance of the season in the League Cup first round at Hillsborough versus League Two side Wrexham, the Owls lost 4–1. He was unlucky to concede a goal without even having a touch of the ball in the following match against Leeds United; he came on as a substitute when Jones was given a straight red card and immediately faced a penalty which was scored by David Healy. Adamson would have to wait until the final two games of the season before finding himself in the team again. Playing his part after the end of Iain Turner's loan spell from Everton. Adamson was released by Wednesday in May 2007 for the second time, after playing 12 first team games in 2 1/2 years.

=== Stockport County & Ilkeston Town ===
On 20 June 2007, Adamson signed a one-year deal with Stockport County. He made just two appearances for the club, both of which were in the FA Cup against Staines Town. He joined Northwich Victoria on an emergency week-long loan, though did not make an appearance. Stockport released Adamson in June 2008. Adamson joined Northern Premier League Premier Division club Ilkeston Town in August 2008.

=== Hereford United ===
After playing a major part in Ilkeston's promotion to the Conference North, Adamson joined Hereford United in July 2009 on a 12-month contract as a player-goalkeeper coach.

He spent the majority of the season as back-up to first choice stopper Adam Bartlett. Adamson only made one appearance for The Bulls and this was on 27 February 2010 in the League Two game against Notts County, where he started the game ahead of Bartlett. This game however would not be a successful game for Adamson as after conceding two goals from Craig Westcarr, he then brought down Westcarr in the penalty box and he was subsequently sent off in the 71st minute of the game. Bartlett, who was the substitute keeper, came on for Leon Constantine conceded the subsequent penalty and two further goals, both scored by Luke Rodgers. Notts County won the game 5–0.

On 9 April 2010 Adamson was involved in a car crash on the M5 motorway between Worcester and Droitwich Spa, he was taken to hospital for minor injuries. but he later discharged. A motorcyclist was airlifted to hospital with chest and shoulder injuries whilst two other people were treated for minor injuries. After the accident, he rested at home to recover from the injuries and he was not involved in any other match day XIII for the remainder of the season.

In May 2010, Adamson was released by Hereford United after making only one appearance.

=== Coaching ===
After he left Hereford, Adamson trained Boston United and played 80 minutes of their 3–1 friendly win over Belper on 31 July 2010. However, he moved Mansfield Town to become the club's goalkeeping coach later that summer.

== Honours ==
Sheffield Wednesday

- Football League One play-offs: 2005
