= Matt Carbon =

English footballer

Personal information
- Full name: Matthew Phillip Carbon
- Date of birth: 8 June 1975 (age 51)
- Place of birth: Nottingham, England
- Height: 6 ft 2 in (1.88 m)
- Position: Centre-back

Youth career
- ?–1993: Lincoln City

Senior career*
Years	Team	Apps	(Gls)
1993–1996	Lincoln City	69	(10)
1996–1998	Derby County	20	(0)
1998–2001	West Bromwich Albion	113	(5)
2001–2004	Walsall	55	(2)
2003	→ Lincoln City (loan)	1	(0)
2004–2006	Barnsley	50	(1)
2006–2007	New Zealand Knights	0	(0)
2007–2008	Milton Keynes Dons	3	(0)
Total		311	(18)

International career
1996–1997	England U21	4	(0)
- * Club domestic league appearances and goals

Matthew Phillip Carbon (born 8 June 1975) is an English footballer who played as a centre-back.

== Biography ==
Matt Carbon is Head of Football at Sports Gateway after retiring from professional football in 2007-08.

Carbon was born in Nottingham. Until the end of the 2007–08 season, he played for Milton Keynes Dons. Prior to that, he played for the New Zealand Knights in the A-League in Australia. He has previously played in the English Premiership for Derby County and the English First Division for West Bromwich Albion and Walsall, alongside spells in lower divisions.

Carbon started his career with Lincoln City in the lower English league, before signing for Derby County in 1996 in a £385,000 deal. Carbon helped Derby win promotion to the Premier League and contributed to Derby's impressive mid-table finish in 1996–97, playing twelve times. Carbon made a further four appearances in 1997–98, before sealing an £800,000 move to First Division side West Brom. Carbon became a regular during his time at The Hawthorns, making over 100 league appearances before his free transfer move to Walsall in 2001. Over fifty league appearances were made for the Saddlers, with a free transfer to Barnsley also bringing 50 games and a goal against Port Vale. In 2006, Carbon moved to the A-League to play for New Zealand Knights but never featured, spending only one game on the bench before being released. He signed for Milton Keynes on an initial two-month deal on 4 December 2007 before retiring.

Carbon played four times for the England under-21 side.
