= James Quinn (footballer, born 1974) =

Northern Ireland footballer (born 1974)

Personal information
- Full name: James Stephen Quinn
- Date of birth: 15 December 1974 (age 51)
- Place of birth: Coventry, England
- Height: 6 ft 1 in (1.85 m)
- Position: Striker

Team information
- Current team: Solihull Moors (caretaker)

Senior career*
Years	Team	Apps	(Gls)
1992–1993	Birmingham City	4	(0)
1993–1998	Blackpool	151	(36)
1994	→ Stockport County (loan)	1	(0)
1998–2002	West Bromwich Albion	114	(9)
2001–2002	→ Notts County (loan)	6	(3)
2002	→ Bristol Rovers (loan)	6	(1)
2002–2005	Willem II	62	(15)
2005	Sheffield Wednesday	15	(2)
2005–2006	Peterborough United	24	(7)
2005	→ Bristol City (loan)	3	(1)
2006–2007	Northampton Town	18	(1)
2007	→ Scunthorpe United (loan)	0	(0)
Total		404	(75)

International career
1994	Northern Ireland U21	1	(0)
1994–1996	Northern Ireland B	2	(2)
1996–2007	Northern Ireland	50	(4)

Managerial career
- 2013: Central Jersey Spartans
- 2025–: Solihull Moors (caretaker)
- * Club domestic league appearances and goals

James Stephen Quinn (born 15 December 1974) is a former professional footballer. A forward, his final club was Northampton Town. He played for numerous clubs in his career, and was also a Northern Ireland international.

== Club career ==
After four league games with Birmingham City, Coventry-born Quinn was sold to Second Division Blackpool for £25,000. He scored a total of 47 goals and made 150 first-team starts over five years. Two of those goals were scored against Chelsea in the League Cup second round. On 12 August 1995, he opened the scoring in Blackpool's game at Bristol City after eleven seconds, equalling the club's fastest-ever goal by Bill Slater at Stoke City 46 years earlier.

These exploits led West Bromwich Albion to sign Quinn for £500,000. He made his Albion debut in a 1–1 home draw against Bury on 21 February 1998. He scored twice in a 2–1 win over Middlesbrough on 4 April 1998, his first goals for the club; however, he found goals hard to come by during his Baggies career, scoring just ten times in 123 appearances in all competitions.

During 2001–02, Quinn was loaned out to Notts County, but returned to the Hawthorns when a permanent deal could not be agreed. He was then loaned out again, to Bristol Rovers, where he scored once against Kidderminster Harriers. In the days following Albion's promotion to the Premier League in April 2002, Quinn found himself surplus to requirements and was released. A few days later he moved to Dutch side Willem II.

Quinn was released by Willem II in January 2005. He had been unhappy with his life in the Netherlands, and set about finding a new club in England whilst training with the MK Dons. He quickly became Paul Sturrock's first permanent signing for Sheffield Wednesday, joining on a short-term contract until the end of the season. After scoring two goals in fifteen appearances during four months at Hillsborough, Quinn signed for Peterborough United in August 2005. In October of the same year he went on a month's loan to Bristol City, scoring on his debut against Oldham Athletic.

He signed for Northampton Town in August 2006, scoring his first and what turned out to be only goal for the club against Brighton on 21 October 2006. On 21 December 2006, a poor start to the season saw him placed on the transfer list alongside Andy Kirk and Scott McGleish. In March 2007 Quinn joined Scunthorpe United on loan for the remainder of the season. He was an unused substitute for the Iron on several occasions, but did not experience any first-team action.

Quinn retired from playing football on 11 September 2007, due to his failure to break back into the Northern Ireland team.

== International career ==
Quinn collected fifty caps for Northern Ireland, and scored goals against Belgium, Luxembourg, Malta and Serbia & Montenegro. He also represented the B team, and played at youth level from U16 to U21.

=== International career ===
Scores and results list Northern Ireland's goal tally first

Goal	Date	Venue	Opponent	Score	Result	Competition
1	11 February 1997	Belfast, Northern Ireland	Belgium	1–0	3–0	Friendly match
2	23 February 2000	Luxembourg City, Luxembourg	Luxembourg	3–1	3–1	Friendly match
3	28 March 2000	Valletta, Malta	Malta	2–0	3–0	Friendly match
4	28 April 2004	Belfast, Northern Ireland	Serbia and Montenegro	1–0	1–1	Friendly match

== Coaching career ==
Quinn took up coaching after the end of his playing days and passed part 1 of the UEFA 'A' Licence in 2009, and in 2010 was coaching youth football in Princeton, New Jersey. In 2012 Quinn returned to England to become a scout with Luton Town FC, before coming back to Princeton NJ in January 2013 to become the Director of U15-U18 College Showcasing for Princeton Soccer Association.

He obtained the UEFA Pro Licence in 2012 and in 2013 was appointed Head Coach of USL Premier Development League side Central Jersey Spartans, shortly before their dissolution.

In the summer of 2015, he joined National League team, Tranmere Rovers, as first-team coach under new manager Gary Brabin. Following a short spell coaching in America he returned to England and in August 2018 he was appointed as the first-team coach at National League club Solihull Moors, working alongside Tim Flowers. He held this role until his departure from the Moors was announced in December 2023.

== Honours ==
Sheffield Wednesday

- Football League One play-offs: 2005
