= 2004–05 West Bromwich Albion F.C. season =

West Bromwich Albion
2004–05 season
- Chairman: Jeremy Peace
- Manager: Gary Megson (until 26 October); Frank Burrows (caretaker); Bryan Robson (from 9 November)
- Stadium: The Hawthorns
- FA Premier League: 17th
- FA Cup: Fourth round
- League Cup: Second round
- Top goalscorer: League: Robert Earnshaw (11); All: Robert Earnshaw (14)
- Highest home attendance: 27,751 (vs. Portsmouth, 15 May 2005)
- Lowest home attendance: 23,849 (vs. Bolton, 2 October 2004)
- Average home league attendance: 25,986
Home colours	Away colours	Third colours

During the 2004–05 English football season, West Bromwich Albion competed in the FA Premier League.

== Season summary ==
West Bromwich Albion managed to retain their Premiership status despite being at the bottom of the table on Christmas Day. This marked the first time in the history of the Premiership that a club has done so. Since then, three other teams have matched this feat: Sunderland in 2013–14, Leicester City in 2014–15, and Wolverhampton Wanderers in 2022–23, although they secured survival before the final day.

=== Final day ===
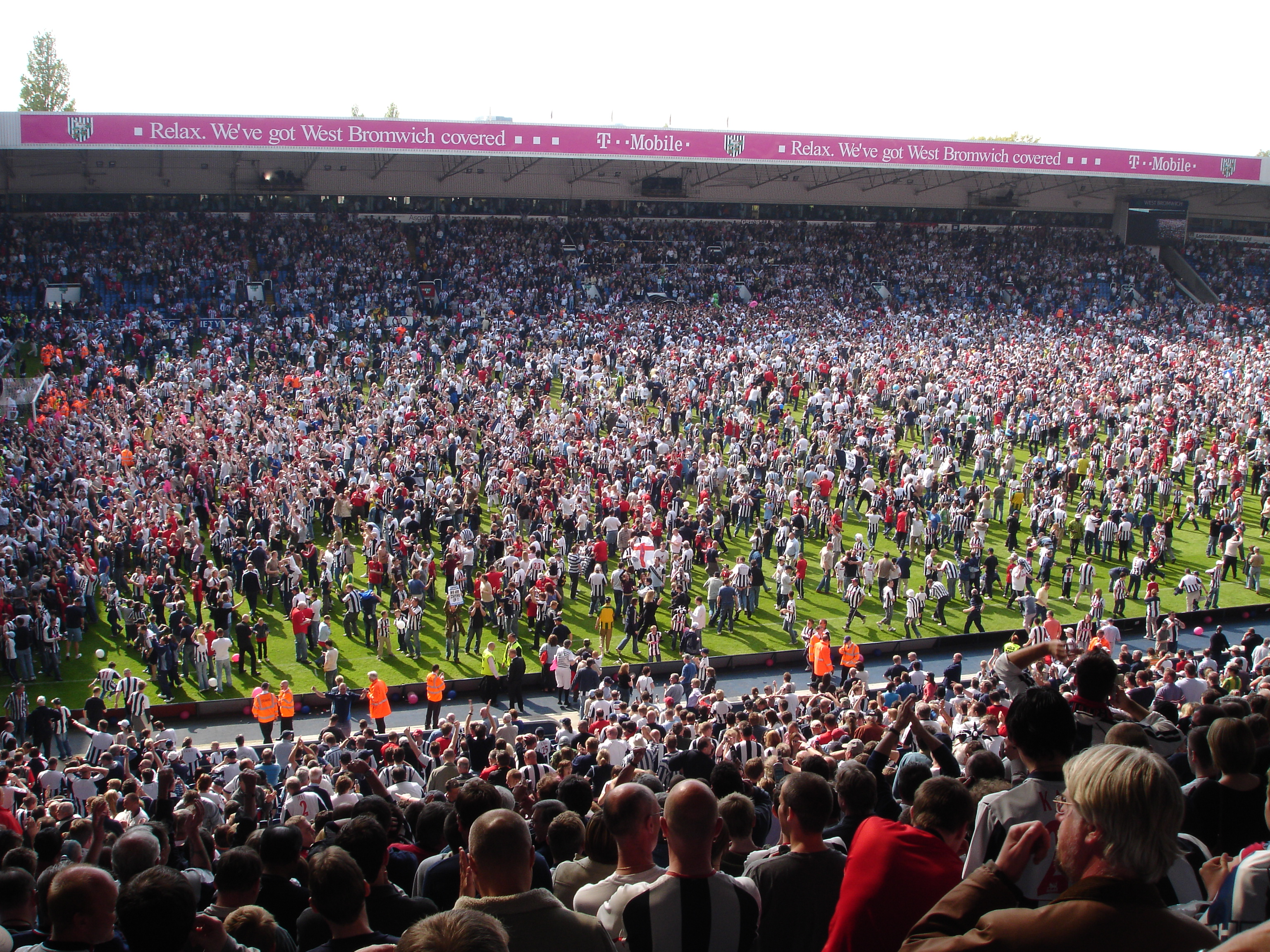
Albion fans invade the Hawthorns pitch following their team's escape from relegation.

For the first time since the inaugural Premiership season in 1992–93, no team was assured of relegation going into the final round of matches. In each of the last three weekends of the season, the team that was bottom of the table at the start of the weekend finished it outside the drop zone. The final round of the season on 15 May started with West Bromwich at the bottom, Southampton and Crystal Palace one point clear and Norwich City in the last safe spot and two points from the bottom. Even worse, only one would survive the drop. The final matchday was publicized by Sky Sports as "Survival Sunday", with accompanying promotional material advertising the last matchday like a title fight or epic movie blockbuster.

West Brom, who had been bottom of the table and eight points from safety at Christmas, did their part by beating Portsmouth at home 2–0. Norwich, the only side to have their fate completely in their own hands, needed a first away victory of the season at Craven Cottage against Fulham to secure their top-flight status and relegate everyone else irrespective of their results. Instead, they were thrashed 6–0 and went down. Southampton, despite leading early on, lost 2–1 at home to Manchester United and were relegated. At The Valley, Crystal Palace led Charlton Athletic 2–1 in the 71st minute, but Jonathan Fortune equalised for Charlton with eight minutes left to send them down. As a result, West Brom stayed up, and made history by becoming the first club in Premiership history to avoid relegation after being bottom of the table at Christmas.

After all four matches ended, cameras focused on the Hawthorns, as confirmation of other results began to filter through. Once the realisation dawned on the players and fans that survival had been achieved, a mass pitch invasion was sparked, with huge celebrations. The Portsmouth fans in the away end of the ground also celebrated despite their defeat as, through losing, they had "helped" relegate arch-rivals Southampton. The defeat itself mattered little to Portsmouth, as they would be unable to improve on their 16th position due to 15th-placed Blackburn Rovers' greater goal difference.

== Final league table ==
Pos	Team	Pld	W	D	L	GF	GA	GD	Pts	Qualification or relegation
15	Blackburn Rovers	38	9	15	14	32	43	−11	42	
16	Portsmouth	38	10	9	19	43	59	−16	39	
17	West Bromwich Albion	38	6	16	16	36	61	−25	34	
18	Crystal Palace (R)	38	7	12	19	41	62	−21	33	Relegation to the Football League Championship
19	Norwich City (R)	38	7	12	19	42	77	−35	33	Relegation to the Football League Championship

Rules for classification: 1) points; 2) goal difference; 3) number of goals scored.
(R) Relegated

== Players ==
=== First-team squad ===
Squad at end of season

Note: Flags indicate national team as defined under FIFA eligibility rules; some limited exceptions apply. Players may hold more than one non-FIFA nationality.

No.	Pos.	Nation	Player
1	GK	ENG	Russell Hoult
2	DF	ENG	Riccardo Scimeca
3	DF	ENG	Paul Robinson
4	DF	DEN	Thomas Gaardsøe
5	DF	JAM	Darren Moore (Note: Moore was born in Birmingham, England, but also qualified to represent Jamaica internationally and made his international debut for Jamaica in 1999.)
6	DF	ENG	Darren Purse
7	MF	WAL	Jason Koumas
8	MF	ENG	Jonathan Greening
9	FW	ENG	Geoff Horsfield
10	MF	WAL	Andy Johnson (Note: Johnson was born in Bristol, England, but also qualified to represent Wales internationally and made his international debut for Wales in 1998.)
11	MF	HUN	Zoltán Gera
12	MF	ENG	Richard Chaplow
14	DF	DEN	Martin Albrechtsen

No.	Pos.	Nation	Player
15	MF	ENG	Kieran Richardson (on loan from Manchester United)
17	FW	ENG	Rob Hulse
18	MF	ENG	Lloyd Dyer
19	DF	ENG	Neil Clement
20	MF	MKD	Artim Šakiri
21	FW	ENG	Kevin Campbell
24	DF	ENG	Ronnie Wallwork
25	FW	NGA	Nwankwo Kanu
28	GK	IRL	Joe Murphy
29	GK	POL	Tomasz Kuszczak
33	MF	JPN	Junichi Inamoto
34	FW	WAL	Robert Earnshaw (Note: Earnshaw was born in Mufulira, Zambia, but was raised in Wales and made his international debut for Wales in May 2002.)

=== Left club during season ===
Note: Flags indicate national team as defined under FIFA eligibility rules; some limited exceptions apply. Players may hold more than one non-FIFA nationality.

No.	Pos.	Nation	Player
12	FW	SCO	Scott Dobie (Note: Dobie was born in Workington, England, but also qualified to represent Scotland internationally and made his international debut for Scotland in May 2002.) (to Millwall)
15	DF	ENG	Sean Gregan (to Leeds United)
16	DF	Romania	Cosmin Contra (on loan from Atlético Madrid)
18	MF	ENG	Lloyd Dyer (on loan to Coventry City)
21	DF	ISL	Lárus Sigurðsson (retired)
22	DF	SUI	Bernt Haas (Note: Haas was born in Vienna, Austria, but also qualified to represent Switzerland internationally and made his international debut for Switzerland in 1996.) (to SC Bastia)
23	MF	IRL	James O'Connor (to Burnley)

No.	Pos.	Nation	Player
26	DF	MLI	Sékou Berthé (released)
27	DF	ENG	James Chambers (to Watford)
30	GK	AUS	Simon Miotto (released)
31	DF	ENG	Phillip Midworth (to Burton Albion)
32	DF	ENG	Adam Chambers (to Kidderminster Harriers)
—	MF	ENG	Simon Brown (to Mansfield Town)
—	DF	ENG	Lee Marshall (retired)

== Statistics ==
=== Appearances and goals ===
As of end of season

No.	Pos	Nat	Player	Total		Premiership		FA Cup		League Cup	
No.	Pos	Nat	Player	Apps	Goals	Apps	Goals	Apps	Goals	Apps	Goals
Goalkeepers
1	GK	(England) ENG	Russell Hoult	39	0	36	0	3	0	0	0
29	GK	(Poland) POL	Tomasz Kuszczak	4	0	2+1	0	0	0	1	0
Defenders
3	DF	(England) ENG	Paul Robinson	33	1	28+2	1	3	0	0	0
4	DF	(Denmark) DEN	Thomas Gaardsøe	31	0	25+4	0	1	0	1	0
5	DF	(England) ENG	Darren Moore	17	0	10+6	0	0	0	1	0
6	DF	(England) ENG	Darren Purse	24	0	22	0	2	0	0	0
14	DF	(Denmark) DEN	Martin Albrechtsen	28	0	20+4	0	3	0	1	0
19	DF	(England) ENG	Neil Clement	38	3	35	3	3	0	0	0
Midfielders
2	MF	(England) ENG	Riccardo Scimeca	36	0	27+6	0	2	0	1	0
7	MF	(Wales) WAL	Jason Koumas	13	0	5+5	0	1+1	0	1	0
8	MF	(England) ENG	Jonathan Greening	37	0	32+2	0	2	0	0+1	0
10	MF	(Wales) WAL	Andy Johnson	23	0	22	0	1	0	0	0
11	MF	(Hungary) HUN	Zoltán Gera	42	6	31+7	6	3	0	1	0
12	MF	(England) ENG	Richard Chaplow	4	0	3+1	0	0	0	0	0
15	MF	(England) ENG	Kieran Richardson	12	3	11+1	3	0	0	0	0
18	MF	(England) ENG	Lloyd Dyer	5	0	0+4	0	0	0	1	0
20	MF	(North Macedonia) MKD	Artim Šakiri	3	0	2+1	0	0	0	0	0
24	MF	(England) ENG	Ronnie Wallwork	23	1	19+1	1	3	0	0	0
33	MF	(Japan) JPN	Junichi Inamoto	3	0	0+3	0	0	0	0	0
Forwards
9	FW	(England) ENG	Geoff Horsfield	32	4	18+11	3	1+1	0	1	1
17	FW	(England) ENG	Rob Hulse	7	0	0+5	0	0+1	0	0+1	0
21	FW	(England) ENG	Kevin Campbell	18	3	16	3	1+1	0	0	0
25	FW	(Nigeria) NGA	Nwankwo Kanu	30	3	21+7	2	2	1	0	0
34	FW	(Wales) WAL	Robert Earnshaw	34	14	18+13	11	2+1	3	0	0
Players transferred or loaned out during the season
12	FW	(Scotland) SCO	Scott Dobie	6	1	1+4	1	0	0	1	0
16	DF	(Romania) ROU	Cosmin Contra	6	0	5	0	0	0	1	0
22	DF	(Switzerland) SUI	Bernt Haas	10	0	9+1	0	0	0	0	0
23	MF	(Republic of Ireland) IRL	James O'Connor	1	0	0	0	0	0	0+1	0

Last updated: 31 June 2005
Source: Competitions

=== Starting 11 ===
Considering starts in all competitions

No.	Pos.	Nat.	Name	MS	Notes
1	GK	(England)	Russell Hoult	39	
5	RB	(England)	Darren Purse	24	
14	CB	(Denmark)	Martin Albrechtsen	24	
4	CB	(Denmark)	Thomas Gaardsoe	27	
19	LB	(England)	Neil Clement	38	
11	RM	(Hungary)	Zoltán Gera	35	
8	CM	(England)	Jonathan Greening	34	Ronnie Wallwork has 22 starts
2	CM	(England)	Riccardo Scimeca	30	Andy Johnson has 23 starts
3	LM	(England)	Paul Robinson	31	
25	CF	(Nigeria)	Nwankwo Kanu	23	
34	CF	(Wales)	Robert Earnshaw	20	Geoff Horsfield has 20 starts

== Transfers ==
=== Transfers in ===
Date	Name	From	Fee	Ref.
18 May 2004	Riccardo Scimeca (ENG)	Leicester City	undisclosed	
3 June 2004	Martin Albrechtsen (DEN)	København	£2,700,000	
18 June 2004	Darren Purse (ENG)	Birmingham City	£750,000	
14 July 2004	Tomasz Kuszczak (POL)	Hertha BSC	free	
29 July 2004	Jonathan Greening (ENG)	Middlesbrough	£1,250,000	
30 July 2004	Zoltán Gera (HUN)	Ferencváros	£1,500,000	
30 July 2004	Nwankwo Kanu (NGA)	Arsenal	free	
30 August 2004	Robert Earnshaw (WAL)	Cardiff City	£3,000,000 (rising to £3,620,000 depending on contractual incentives)	
31 August 2004	Junichi Inamoto (JPN)	Gamba Osaka	£200,000	
10 January 2005	Kevin Campbell (ENG)	Everton	free	
31 January 2005	Richard Chaplow (ENG)	Burnley	£1,500,000	

=== Loans in ===
Date from	Name	From	Duration	Ref.
31 August 2004	Cosmin Contra (ROM)	Atlético Madrid	season-long loan	
29 January 2005	Kieran Richardson (ENG)	Manchester United	season-long loan	

=== Transfers out ===
Date	Name	To	Fee	Ref.
30 June 2004	Phil Gilchrist (ENG)	Rotherham United	released	
30 June 2004	Daniel Crane (ENG)	Burton Albion	released	
30 June 2004	Joost Volmer (NED)	FC Den Bosch	released	
30 June 2004	Delroy Facey (GRN)	Hull City	released	
30 June 2004	Tamika Mkandawire (MAW)	Hereford United	released	
30 June 2004	Mark Kinsella (IRL)	Walsall	released	
9 August 2004	Lee Hughes (ENG)		contract terminated	
16 September 2004	Sean Gregan (ENG)	Leeds United	£500,000 (rising to £750,000 dependent on appearances)	
25 September 2004	James Chambers (ENG)	Watford	£250,000	
8 November 2004	Scott Dobie (SCO)	Millwall	£750,000	
2 December 2004	Larus Sigurdsson (ISL)		retired	
6 December 2004	Simon Brown (ENG)	Mansfield Town	£50,000	
21 January 2005	Bernt Haas (SUI)	Bastia	released	
9 February 2005	Sékou Berthé (MLI)		released	
9 February 2005	Simon Miotto (AUS)		released	
9 February 2005	Adam Chambers (ENG)	Kidderminster Harriers	released	
24 March 2005	James O'Connor (IRL)	Burnley	£175,000	
22 April 2005	Lee Marshall (ENG)		retired	
	Phillip Midworth (ENG)	Burton Albion	released	

=== Loans out ===
Date from	Name	To	Date until	Ref.
9 February 2005	Rob Hulse (ENG)	Leeds United	season-long loan	
22 March 2005	Lloyd Dyer (ENG)	Coventry City	three-month loan	

Transfers in: ▼£10,800,000
Transfers out: ▲£1,675,000
Total spending: ▼£9,125,000

== Results ==
West Bromwich Albion's result comes first

Win	Draw	Loss

=== Premier League ===
==== Results per matchday ====
Matchday	1	2	3	4	5	6	7	8	9	10	11	12	13	14	15	16	17	18	19	20	21	22	23	24	25	26	27	28	29	30	31	32	33	34	35	36	37	38
Ground	A	H	H	A	A	H	A	H	H	A	H	A	H	A	H	A	H	A	H	A	A	H	A	H	H	A	H	H	A	A	H	A	A	A	H	H	A	H
Result	D	D	D	L	L	D	L	W	D	L	L	D	L	D	L	L	L	L	L	D	D	D	L	W	D	L	D	W	L	W	W	D	D	L	D	L	D	W
Position	14	12	11	14	17	19	18	15	15	16	17	17	18	19	20	20	20	20	20	20	20	20	20	20	20	20	20	19	19	19	18	17	17	19	18	19	20	17

Updated to match(es) played on 15 May 2005. Source: Statto.com
A = Away; H = Home; W = Win; D = Draw; L = Loss

Round	Date	Opponent	Venue	Result	Scorers	Attendance	Ref.
1	14 August 2004	Blackburn Rovers	Away	1–1	Clement 33'	23,475 (2,424)	
2	22 August 2004	Aston Villa	Home	1–1	Clement 38'	26,601 (2,600)	
3	25 August 2004	Tottenham Hotspur	Home	1–1	Gera 3'	27,191 (2,589)	
4	28 August 2004	Everton	Away	1–2	Dobie 7'	34,510	
5	11 September 2004	Liverpool	Away	0–3	—	42,947	
6	18 September 2004	Fulham	Home	1–1	Kanu 88'	24,128 (983)	
7	25 September 2004	Newcastle United	Away	1–3	Horsfield 87'	52,308	
8	2 October 2004	Bolton Wanderers	Home	2–1	Kanu 57', Gera 65'	23,849 (1,285)	
9	16 October 2004	Norwich City	Home	0–0	—	26,257	
10	23 October 2004	Crystal Palace	Away	0–3	—	22,922	
11	30 October 2004	Chelsea	Home	1–4	Gera 56'	27,399 (2,600)	
12	6 November 2004	Southampton	Away	2–2	Earnshaw 29', 37'	31,057 (3,188)	
13	14 November 2004	Middlesbrough	Home	1–2	Earnshaw 37'	24,008 (1,329)	
14	20 November 2004	Arsenal	Away	1–1	Earnshaw 79'	38,109 (2,900)	
15	27 November 2004	Manchester United	Home	0–3	—	27,709 (2,600)	
16	4 December 2004	Portsmouth	Away	2–3	Stefanović 14' (o.g.), Earnshaw 45'	20,110	
17	11 December 2004	Charlton Athletic	Home	0–1	—	24,697 (1,344)	
18	18 December 2004	Birmingham City	Away	0–4	—	28,880	
19	26 December 2004	Liverpool	Home	0–5	—	27,533 (2,599)	
20	28 December 2004	Manchester City	Away	1–1	Dunne 85' (o.g.)	47,177	
21	1 January 2005	Bolton Wanderers	Away	1–1	Gera 13'	25,205 (2,300)	
22	3 January 2005	Newcastle United	Home	0–0	—	25,259	
23	16 January 2005	Fulham	Away	0–1	—	16,180	
24	22 January 2005	Manchester City	Home	2–0	Campbell 5', Wallwork 81'	25,348 (2,590)	
25	1 February 2005	Crystal Palace	Home	2–2	Campbell 82', Earnshaw 90'	25,092 (1,583)	
26	5 February 2005	Norwich City	Away	2–3	Earnshaw 41', Richardson 49'	24,292	
27	22 February 2005	Southampton	Home	0–0	—	25,865	
28	6 March 2005	Birmingham City	Home	2–0	Clement 53', Campbell 64'	25,749 (2,600)	
29	15 March 2005	Chelsea	Away	0–1	—	41,713	
30	19 March 2005	Charlton Athletic	Away	4–1	Horsfield 9', Earnshaw 73', 84', 90' (pen.)	27,104 (2,996)	
31	3 April 2005	Everton	Home	1–0	Gera 63'	26,805 (2,596)	
32	10 April 2005	Aston Villa	Away	1–1	Robinson 90'	39,402 (3,400)	
33	20 April 2005	Tottenham Hotspur	Away	1–1	Gera 24'	35,885	
34	23 April 2005	Middlesbrough	Away	0–4	—	32,951 (2,394)	
35	26 April 2005	Blackburn Rovers	Home	1–1	Richardson 32'	25,154 (856)	
36	2 May 2005	Arsenal	Home	0–2	—	27,351 (2,599)	
37	7 May 2005	Manchester United	Away	1–1	Earnshaw 60' (pen.)	67,827 (2,500)	
38	15 May 2005	Portsmouth	Home	2–0	Horsfield 58', Richardson 75'	27,751 (2,600)	

=== FA Cup ===
Round	Date	Opponent	Venue	Result	Scorers	Attendance
Third round	8 January 2005	Preston North End	Deepdale	2–0	Earnshaw 76', 83'	13,005
Fourth round	29 January 2005	Tottenham Hotspur	The Hawthorns	1–1	Earnshaw 17'	22,441
Fourth round replay	12 February 2005	Tottenham Hotspur	White Hart Lane	1–3	Kanu 12'	27,860

=== Football League Cup ===
Round	Date	Opponent	Venue	Result	Scorers	Attendance
Second round	21 September 2004	Colchester United	Layer Road	1–2 (a.e.t.)	Horsfield 50'	4,591
