= 2003–04 West Bromwich Albion F.C. season =

West Bromwich Albion
2003–04 season
- Chairman: Jeremy Peace
- Manager: Gary Megson
- Stadium: The Hawthorns
- First Division: 2nd (promoted)
- FA Cup: Third round
- League Cup: Fifth round
- Top goalscorer: League: Hughes (11); All: Hulse (13)
- Average home league attendance: 24,764
| Home colours | Away colours |

During the 2003–04 English football season, West Bromwich Albion F.C. competed in the First Division.

== Season summary ==
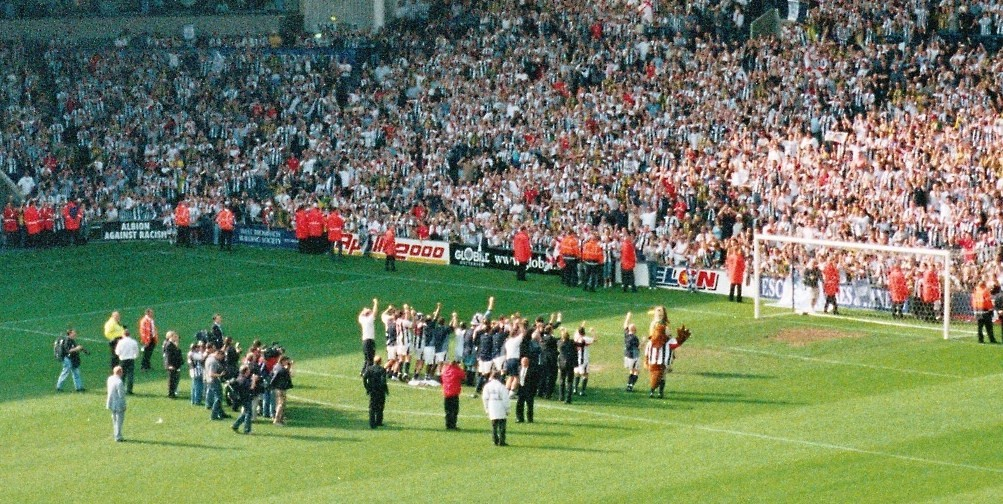
The Albion team celebrate winning promotion to the Premier League.

The club had been managed by Gary Megson since March 2000, who oversaw promotion to the Premier League in 2002 and subsequent relegation back to the First Division in the 2002–03 season. The club spent £1.5 million in the summer transfer window, including the £750,000 of Rob Hulse from Crewe Alexandra.

In the 2003–04 season, Albion had their best League Cup run for 22 years, beating Newcastle United and Manchester United before losing to Arsenal in the quarter-finals. The team also enjoyed good form in the league, remaining in the top two from mid-October until the end of the season, winning promotion back to the Premiership, again as runners-up, at the first attempt.

Albion unveiled the Astle Gates outside their home ground, The Hawthorns, in July 2003. The gates are a tribute to the club's former striker, Jeff Astle, who died in January 2002.

== Final league table ==
| Pos | Team | Pld | W | D | L | GF | GA | GD | Pts | Promotion, qualification or relegation |
|---|---|---|---|---|---|---|---|---|---|---|
| 1 | Norwich City (C, P) | 46 | 28 | 10 | 8 | 79 | 39 | +40 | 94 | Promotion to the FA Premier League |
| 2 | West Bromwich Albion (P) | 46 | 25 | 11 | 10 | 64 | 42 | +22 | 86 | Promotion to the FA Premier League |
| 3 | Sunderland | 46 | 22 | 13 | 11 | 62 | 45 | +17 | 79 | Qualification for the First Division play-offs |
| 4 | West Ham United | 46 | 19 | 17 | 10 | 67 | 45 | +22 | 74 | Qualification for the First Division play-offs |
| 5 | Ipswich Town | 46 | 21 | 10 | 15 | 84 | 72 | +12 | 73 | Qualification for the First Division play-offs |

Source: Soccerway
Rules for classification: 1) points; 2) goal difference; 3) number of goals scored.
(C) Champions; (P) Promoted

== Results ==
West Bromwich Albion's score comes first

=== Legend ===
| Win | Draw | Loss |

=== Football League First Division ===
| Date | Opponent | Venue | Result | Attendance | Scorers |
|---|---|---|---|---|---|
| 9 August 2003 | Walsall | A | 1–4 | 11,030 (2,400) | Koumas |
| 16 August 2003 | Burnley | H | 4–1 | 22,489 (945) | Šakiri, Hulse, Hughes (2) |
| 23 August 2003 | Watford | A | 1–0 | 15,023 | Hughes |
| 25 August 2003 | Preston North End | H | 1–0 | 24,402 | Hughes (pen) |
| 30 August 2003 | Derby County | A | 1–0 | 21,499 | Hulse |
| 13 September 2003 | Ipswich Town | H | 4–1 | 24,954 (1,407) | Gaardsøe, Hulse (2), Diallo (own goal) |
| 16 September 2003 | Wigan Athletic | A | 0–1 | 12,874 | |
| 20 September 2003 | Crystal Palace | A | 2–2 | 17,477 (1,843) | Hulse, Koumas |
| 27 September 2003 | Stoke City | H | 1–0 | 24,297 (1,479) | Dobie |
| 30 September 2003 | Millwall | H | 2–1 | 22,909 (768) | Koumas, Dobie |
| 4 October 2003 | Gillingham | A | 2–0 | 8,883 (1,600) | Dobie, Clement |
| 14 October 2003 | Sheffield United | H | 0–2 | 27,195 | |
| 18 October 2003 | Norwich City | H | 1–0 | 24,966 (2,001) | Koumas |
| 21 October 2003 | Wimbledon | H | 0–1 | 22,048 (24) | |
| 25 October 2003 | Rotherham United | A | 3–0 | 7,815 (2,324) | Barker (own goal), Hulse (2) |
| 1 November 2003 | Sunderland | H | 0–0 | 26,135 | |
| 8 November 2003 | West Ham United | A | 4–3 | 30,359 (2,993) | Hulse (2), Deane (own goal), Hughes |
| 22 November 2003 | Reading | H | 0–0 | 22,839 | |
| 25 November 2003 | Cardiff City | A | 1–1 | 17,678 (1,600) | Koumas |
| 29 November 2003 | Nottingham Forest | A | 3–0 | 27,331 (4,834) | Koumas (2), Louis-Jean (own goal) |
| 6 December 2003 | West Ham United | H | 1–1 | 26,194 | Mullins (own goal) |
| 9 December 2003 | Bradford City | A | 1–0 | 11,198 | Dobie |
| 13 December 2003 | Crewe Alexandra | H | 2–2 | 22,825 | Haas, Gregan |
| 20 December 2003 | Coventry City | A | 0–1 | 17,616 | |
| 26 December 2003 | Derby County | H | 1–1 | 26,412 (1,887) | Gaardsøe |
| 28 December 2003 | Wimbledon | A | 0–0 | 6,376 | |
| 9 January 2004 | Walsall | H | 2–0 | 24,558 (2,178) | Koumas, Horsfield |
| 17 January 2004 | Burnley | A | 1–1 | 13,106 | Horsfield |
| 31 January 2004 | Watford | H | 3–1 | 23,958 (828) | Horsfield (2), Hughes |
| 7 February 2004 | Preston North End | A | 0–3 | 16,569 (2,800) | |
| 14 February 2004 | Cardiff City | H | 2–1 | 25,196 (2,312) | Clement, Hughes |
| 21 February 2004 | Sheffield United | A | 2–1 | 24,805 | Moore, Gaardsøe |
| 28 February 2004 | Rotherham United | H | 0–1 | 24,104 | |
| 2 March 2004 | Norwich City | A | 0–0 | 23,223 (1,077) | |
| 6 March 2004 | Coventry City | H | 3–0 | 25,414 (2,190) | Horsfield, Hulse, Kinsella |
| 13 March 2004 | Crewe Alexandra | A | 2–1 | 8,335 | Johnson, Hughes |
| 16 March 2004 | Wigan Athletic | H | 2–1 | 26,215 | Hughes (pen), Gaardsøe |
| 27 March 2004 | Crystal Palace | H | 2–0 | 24,990 (907) | Moore, Dyer |
| 4 April 2004 | Ipswich Town | A | 3–2 | 24,608 (1,723) | Koumas, Dyer, Horsfield |
| 10 April 2004 | Gillingham | H | 1–0 | 24,524 (684) | Hughes |
| 12 April 2004 | Millwall | A | 1–1 | 13,304 (2,123) | Johnson |
| 18 April 2004 | Sunderland | A | 1–0 | 32,201 (2,721) | Koumas |
| 24 April 2004 | Bradford City | H | 2–0 | 26,143 (565) | Horsfield, Hughes |
| 1 May 2004 | Reading | A | 0–1 | 20,619 | |
| 4 May 2004 | Stoke City | A | 1–4 | 18,352 | Dobie |
| 9 May 2004 | Nottingham Forest | H | 0–2 | 26,821 | |

=== FA Cup ===
| Round | Date | Opponent | Venue | Result | Attendance | Goalscorers |
|---|---|---|---|---|---|---|
| R3 | 3 January 2004 | Nottingham Forest | A | 0–1 | 11,843 | |

=== League Cup ===
| Round | Date | Opponent | Venue | Result | Attendance | Goalscorers |
|---|---|---|---|---|---|---|
| R1 | 12 August 2003 | Brentford | H | 4–0 | 10,490 | Hulse (2), Haas, Dobie |
| R2 | 23 September 2003 | Hartlepool United | A | 2–1 | 5,265 | Clement, Hulse |
| R3 | 29 October 2003 | Newcastle United | A | 2–1 | 46,932 | Ameobi (own goal), Hughes |
| R4 | 3 December 2003 | Manchester United | H | 2–0 | 25,282 (2,593) | Haas, Dobie |
| R5 | 16 December 2003 | Arsenal | H | 0–2 | 20,369 (1,688) | |

== Players ==
=== First-team squad ===
Note: Flags indicate national team as defined under FIFA eligibility rules; some limited exceptions apply. Players may hold more than one non-FIFA nationality.

| No. | Pos. | Nation | Player |
|---|---|---|---|
| 1 | GK | (England) ENG | Russell Hoult |
| 2 | DF | (Switzerland) SUI | Bernt Haas (Note: Haas was born in Vienna, Austria, but also qualified to represent Switzerland internationally and made his international debut for Switzerland in 1996.) |
| 3 | DF | (England) ENG | Neil Clement |
| 4 | MF | (Republic of Ireland) IRL | James O'Connor |
| 5 | DF | (Jamaica) JAM | Darren Moore (Note: Moore was born in Birmingham, England, but also qualified to represent Jamaica internationally and made his international debut for Jamaica in 1999.) |
| 6 | DF | (England) ENG | Phil Gilchrist |
| 7 | DF | (England) ENG | Ronnie Wallwork |
| 10 | MF | (Wales) WAL | Andy Johnson (Note: Johnson was born in Bristol, England, but also qualified to represent Wales internationally and made his international debut for Wales in 1998.) |
| 11 | MF | (Republic of Ireland) IRL | Mark Kinsella |
| 12 | FW | (Scotland) SCO | Scott Dobie (Note: Dobie was born in Workington, England, but also qualified to represent Scotland internationally and made his international debut for Scotland in May 2002.) |
| 14 | MF | (England) ENG | Sean Gregan |
| 15 | FW | (England) ENG | Rob Hulse |
| 16 | MF | (England) ENG | Lee Marshall |
| 17 | DF | (Iceland) ISL | Lárus Sigurðsson |
| 18 | MF | (Wales) WAL | Jason Koumas |
| 19 | FW | (England) ENG | Lee Hughes |
| 20 | MF | (North Macedonia) MKD | Artim Šakiri |

| No. | Pos. | Nation | Player |
|---|---|---|---|
| 21 | GK | (Republic of Ireland) IRL | Joe Murphy |
| 22 | DF | (England) ENG | James Chambers |
| 23 | DF | (England) ENG | Adam Chambers |
| 24 | MF | (Denmark) DEN | Thomas Gaardsøe |
| 25 | DF | (Netherlands) NED | Joost Volmer |
| 26 | DF | (Mali) MLI | Sékou Berthé |
| 28 | MF | (England) ENG | Simon Brown |
| 29 | MF | (England) ENG | Lloyd Dyer |
| 30 | MF | (England) ENG | Tamika Mkandawire (Note: Mkandawire was born in Mzuzu, Malawi, but held United Kingdom citizenship and was ineligible to represent Malawi internationally.) |
| 31 | GK | (England) ENG | Daniel Crane |
| 32 | DF | (Senegal) SEN | Alassane N'Dour (on loan from AS Saint-Etienne) |
| 33 | DF | (England) ENG | Paul Robinson |
| 34 | FW | (England) ENG | Geoff Horsfield |
| 35 | FW | (England) ENG | Delroy Facey (Note: Facey was born in Huddersfield, England, but also qualified to represent Grenada internationally through his mother and would make his international debut for Grenada in July 2009.) |
| 36 | FW | (Denmark) DEN | Morten Skoubo (on loan from Borussia Mönchengladbach) |
| 37 | GK | (Australia) AUS | Simon Miotto |

=== Left club during season ===
Note: Flags indicate national team as defined under FIFA eligibility rules; some limited exceptions apply. Players may hold more than one non-FIFA nationality.

| No. | Pos. | Nation | Player |
|---|---|---|---|
| 8 | MF | (England) ENG | Michael Appleton (retired) |
| 9 | FW | (England) ENG | Danny Dichio (to Millwall) |
| 11 | FW | (Grenada) GRN | Jason Roberts (Note: Roberts was born in Park Royal, England, but also qualified to represent Grenada internationally through his father and made his international debut for Grenada in 1998.) (to Wigan Athletic) |

| No. | Pos. | Nation | Player |
|---|---|---|---|
| 27 | DF | (England) ENG | Ross Adams (to Hednesford Town) |
| 37 | GK | (England) ENG | Kevin Pressman (on loan from Sheffield Wednesday) |

=== Transfers ===
==== In ====
| Date | Position | Name | Club From | Transfer Fee | Reference |
|---|---|---|---|---|---|
| 11 July 2003 | FW | Rob Hulse | Crewe Alexandra | £750,000 | |
| 11 July 2003 | MF | James O'Connor | Stoke City | £250,000 | |
| 14 July 2003 | DF | Bernt Haas | Sunderland | £500,000 | |
| 31 July 2003 | DF | Thomas Gaardsøe | Ipswich Town | £500,000 | |
| 31 July 2003 | MF | Artim Šakiri | CSKA Sofia | Nominal | |
| 7 August 2003 | DF | Joost Volmer | AZ Alkmaar | Free | |
| 18 December 2003 | FW | Geoff Horsfield | Wigan Athletic | £1,000,000 | |
| 15 January 2004 | MF | Mark Kinsella | Aston Villa | Free | |
| | DF | Sékou Berthé | Troyes | | |

==== Out ====
| Date | Position | Name | Club To | Transfer Fee | Reference |
|---|---|---|---|---|---|
| 30 June 2003 | DF | Des Lyttle | Free Agency | Released | |
| 30 June 2003 | MF | Jordão | Free Agency | Released | |
| 30 June 2003 | GK | Brian Jensen | Burnley | Free | |
| 9 July 2003 | DF | Igor Bališ | Free Agency | Mutual Consent | |
| 11 July 2003 | MF | Derek McInnes | Dundee United | Free | |
| 19 August 2003 | FW | Bob Taylor | Cheltenham Town | Free | |
| | FW | Jason Roberts | Wigan Athletic | | |
