= Geoff Horsfield =

English footballer

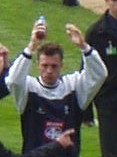
- Horsfield in 2003

Personal information
- Full name: Geoffrey Malcolm Horsfield
- Date of birth: 1 November 1973 (age 52)
- Place of birth: Barnsley, West Riding of Yorkshire, England
- Height: 5 ft 10 in (1.78 m)
- Position: Striker

Senior career*
Years	Team	Apps	(Gls)
–	Athersley Recreation		
–	Worsbrough Bridge MW		
1992–1994	Scarborough	12	(1)
1994	Halifax Town	9	(0)
1994–1995	Guiseley	58	(24)
1995–1996	Witton Albion		
1996–1998	Halifax Town	74	(46)
1998–2000	Fulham	59	(22)
2000–2003	Birmingham City	108	(23)
2003	Wigan Athletic	16	(7)
2003–2006	West Bromwich Albion	67	(14)
2006	→ Sheffield United (loan)	3	(0)
2006–2008	Sheffield United	0	(0)
2006–2007	→ Leeds United (loan)	14	(2)
2007	→ Leicester City (loan)	13	(2)
2008	→ Scunthorpe United (loan)	12	(0)
2009	Lincoln City	17	(1)
2009–2010	Port Vale	9	(0)
2013	Alvechurch		
Total		471+	(142+)

Managerial career
- 2010–2011: Port Vale (caretaker)
- * Club domestic league appearances and goals

Geoffrey Malcolm Horsfield (born 1 November 1973) is an English former professional footballer and football coach. He made more than 300 appearances in the Football League playing as a striker.

He was a "strong and forceful" player, able to hold the ball up to bring other players into the game. Horsfield made his Football League debut with Scarborough as a teenager. Released by the club, he returned to part-time football with Halifax Town, Guiseley and Witton Albion, before a second spell at Halifax saw him help the club regain their Football League status. He moved on to Fulham, with whom he achieved promotion to the First Division, before joining Birmingham City for a club record fee. He played in the final of the 2001 League Cup with Birmingham, and the following season helped them reach the Premier League.

After a short period at Wigan Athletic in 2003, he joined West Bromwich Albion, with whom he again won promotion to the Premier League. In 2006, he moved to Sheffield United, but much of his time there was spent on loan to other clubs, namely Leeds United, Leicester City and Scunthorpe United. Horsfield announced his retirement from football in 2008 after being diagnosed with testicular cancer, but after successful treatment, he resumed his career, signing a six-month contract for Lincoln City in January 2009. In July of that year, he was appointed player-assistant manager at Port Vale under Micky Adams, and the following summer, he took up coaching full-time before leaving the game completely in May 2012. In March 2013, he returned to playing football for Alvechurch.

== Playing career ==
=== Early career ===
Horsfield was born in Barnsley, West Riding of Yorkshire. His father, Terry, was a coal miner, as was his grandfather. While still a schoolboy he started playing football for a men's team, Athersley Recreation, in the Barnsley Sunday League, and had an unsuccessful trial with home-town club Barnsley F.C. On leaving school, Horsfield took a college course in bricklaying. He continued playing football part-time, with Athersley, with Worsbrough Bridge in the Northern Counties East League, and with Football League club Scarborough, where he turned professional in July 1992. Given his league debut in March 1993 by manager Ray McHale, he was released after playing 12 league matches and returned to bricklaying and part-time football. After a nine-game spell with Halifax Town in 1994, he rejoined manager McHale at Guiseley, where his goals helped the club to reach third place in the Northern Premier League Premier Division in the 1994–95 season. During the following season he moved on to Witton Albion, where he scored 6 goals in 26 appearances in all competitions. However, he also sustained a potentially career-threatening knee injury; after making a full recovery he returned to Halifax for a fee reported as £4,000.

Horsfield made his second debut for Halifax in October 1996. On the last day of the 1996–97 season, needing to beat Stevenage Borough to avoid relegation from the Conference, Horsfield scored the goal that clinched a 4–2 victory. The following season, Halifax won the Conference title by a nine-point margin, thus regaining their Football League status. Horsfield's 30 goals in 40 league games, including hat-tricks against Yeovil Town, Telford United and Hereford United, made him that season's Conference top scorer. Together with teammate Mark Bradshaw, Horsfield was selected for England's semi-professional representative team for a match against their Dutch counterparts, but injury prevented him from playing. In the Conference, Horsfield had still been working in the building trade while playing football part-time, but promotion to the Football League meant he had to give up his job to become a full-time footballer. Seven goals in his first ten games in the Third Division attracted a bid from Fulham, then in the Second Division and managed by Kevin Keegan.

=== Fulham ===
An initial fee of £300,000 was agreed, plus an additional £50,000 depending on appearances, and in October 1998 Horsfield joined Fulham. A clause was also included in the contract which would allow Halifax a share of the profits from any future sale. The remainder of his 1998–99 season produced 15 goals from 28 games as Fulham won the Second Division title by 14 clear points. He was also named in the PFA's Second Division Team of the Year. Though less prolific in the First Division, seven league goals and another seven in the cups still made him the club's top scorer for the 1999–2000 season. After new manager Jean Tigana made it clear that Horsfield's aggressive style and perceived lack of pace and mobility would not fit the way he wanted his new team to play, and brought in Louis Saha as his main striker, the player agreed to join Fulham's First Division rivals Birmingham City.

=== Birmingham City ===
In July 2000, Horsfield signed a five-year contract with Birmingham, who paid a club record fee of £2.25 million, £350,000 of which went to Halifax Town under the sell-on clause. He was their top scorer in his first season, finding the net on twelve occasions, and his two goals in the second leg of the League Cup semi-final helped the club reach their first major final for nearly 40 years. In the starting eleven for the final against his boyhood heroes Liverpool, Horsfield had been substituted by the time Birmingham lost in a penalty shoot-out.

In the 2001–02 season, Horsfield was chosen Player of the Year both by Birmingham's fans and by his teammates. His strike partnership with Stern John proved crucial in the unbeaten run which helped Birmingham reach the First Division play-offs, and he scored the equaliser against Norwich City in the play-off final, which the club went on to win on penalties to earn promotion to the Premier League. Horsfield had promised a donation to his first club, Athersley Rec, if he ever reached the Premiership; a few days after the play-off victory he gave them £25,000 towards improving their facilities.

Horsfield's first Premier League goal came in the September 2002 local derby defeat of Aston Villa. He also scored in the return fixture at Villa Park, an eventful game in which he ended up keeping goal when Nico Vaesen was injured after Birmingham had used all their substitutes. Horsfield missed games through suspension and surgery, and was frustrated by manager Steve Bruce preferring to use him as a specialist substitute; after he came on to score a late winner against local rivals West Bromwich Albion, Bruce described him as "a manager's dream", saying that "when you're tiring, the last thing you need is Big Horse rampaging at you". Starting alongside World Cup-winner Christophe Dugarry late in the season, the pair formed "an unlikely combination, brilliance from Bordeaux alongside a brickie from Barnsley, but Horsfield's robust approach has complemented Dugarry's more delicate touches"; their partnership produced four wins and a draw from the last six games.

=== Wigan Athletic ===
Horsfield played in three Premier League matches for Birmingham City at the start of the 2003–04 season. When Bruce could not guarantee him a regular place in the team, Horsfield moved on to Wigan Athletic, signing a three-year contract in September 2003. A transfer fee of £500,000 was agreed, though this could have risen to £1 million if the player had gone on to make enough appearances for Wigan. Horsfield said of the move, "I could easily have sat out the last two years of my contract at Birmingham, but that's not my style – I just want to play football." He scored on his debut for Wigan, in a 4–2 win against Wimbledon on 13 September 2003. He continued to live in the West Midlands even after his transfer from Birmingham City, and after just three months at Wigan moved to West Bromwich Albion for £1 million.

=== West Bromwich Albion ===
"I actually went out on a bit of a limb by saying to the chairman that I think [Horsfield] would get us promoted ... I think he just gave us that little something that was missing in getting hold of the ball, a little bit of cuteness up the front that enabled us to bring other people into the game."

— Albion manager Gary Megson, reflecting on his reasons for signing Horsfield in 2003

Horsfield made his Albion debut in a 1–0 defeat away to Coventry City on 20 December 2003. The following month, he scored his first goal for the club in a 2–0 win against Albion's local rivals Walsall. It was the first of three goals he scored during January 2004, earning him the PFA First Division Player-of-the-Month award. In all he scored seven goals for Albion during 2003–04, including a vital winner in a 3-2 win against fellow promotion chasers Ipswich in April, helping the club to achieve promotion to the Premier League.

The team struggled in their first season back in the top division, while Horsfield scored just three goals in 29 league appearances. His contribution on the final day of the season against Portsmouth however, proved vital to the club's survival. Coming on as a second-half substitute, he scored with his first touch, before setting up a goal for teammate Kieran Richardson. Combined with results from other matches, the 2–0 win ensured Albion's escape from relegation as the first club to survive in the Premier League after being bottom at Christmas. Horsfield said of the achievement, "Even though I have been promoted with every club I have been at this is the best moment of my career."

Horsfield enjoyed a good start to 2005–06, signing a new two-year contract and scoring twice in each of Albion's first two home games, but these proved to be the last goals he would score for the club. He made a total of 20 appearances in league and cup during his final season at West Bromwich Albion.

=== Sheffield United and loans ===
Horsfield signed for Sheffield United on loan in February 2006, but appeared in just three games under manager Neil Warnock in the four months. Horsfield and Warnock wanted to terminate the loan prematurely, but West Bromwich Albion had already agreed to sell the player to United at the end of the season and refused to return on the deal. The permanent transfer went through in May 2006 for a fee of £1.2 million, with Horsfield commenting that he and Warnock had resolved their differences.

On 3 August 2006, Horsfield signed for Championship club Leeds United on loan until Christmas with a view to a permanent move. He made his debut on the opening day of the season, against Norwich at Elland Road, and scored his first goal in a 2–2 draw away at Queens Park Rangers three days later. When Dennis Wise took over as Leeds manager, Horsfield was in and out of the side, and his loan was terminated in January 2007. At the end of the January 2007 transfer window, Leicester City took Horsfield on loan for the rest of the season. He made his debut for the club in their 1–1 draw with Luton Town on 3 February and scored his first goals for them in their 3–0 victory over local rivals Coventry City two weeks later.

Horsfield's former West Bromwich Albion manager Bryan Robson became manager at Sheffield United at the start of the 2007–08 season, but Horsfield remained out of the side. His only appearances came in the League Cup, playing against Chesterfield in the first round and scoring against Milton Keynes Dons in the second. On 31 January 2008 he moved to Championship club Scunthorpe United on loan for the remainder of the season. He went straight into the Scunthorpe squad and made his debut against Charlton Athletic at Glanford Park; the team won 1–0 and Horsfield won the sponsors' "man of the match" award. He played twelve games while on loan and was released by Sheffield United at the end of the season.

Horsfield had a trial at Chesterfield during the summer of 2008 but rejected a move to Saltergate because he wanted to join a club closer to his home in Leicester. He then had a trial with Kettering Town and in September began training with Walsall.

=== Lincoln City ===
On 10 October 2008, Horsfield revealed that he had been diagnosed with testicular cancer, and was advised that his playing career was finished. By December, after receiving successful treatment, he was reported to be considering a return to football, either as a player or in a coaching role. He linked up with Lincoln City, managed by former Halifax Town teammate Peter Jackson, for a week's training to assess his fitness levels, and after an extended trial period, signed a short-term playing contract to run from 2 January 2009 until the end of the season. He would also be involved with coaching the reserve team. Horsfield made his debut on 12 January against Brentford, setting up the equaliser for fellow debutant Anthony Elding in a 2–2 draw. After the game, he declared he was "glad to be back playing". He scored his first goal for the club on 27 January 2009, in a 2–1 win against Gillingham, describing the long-range shot "one of my sweetest strikes". Horsfield played regularly during his time with Lincoln, but scored only that one goal, and at the end of the season the club decided not to renew his contract.

=== Port Vale ===
In July 2009, Port Vale's Micky Adams appointed Horsfield as player-assistant manager. He aimed to play a majority of Vale's games in the 2009–10 season while learning the ropes of management. He played in the opening four games of the season despite needing painkillers for a cracked rib and a cracked bone in his hand, the first broken bones he had ever suffered. The club reached the third round of the League Cup, but after three consecutive defeats, Adams placed the entire squad on the transfer list. He suffered from niggling injuries, in addition to a tore hamstring, which limited his appearances. This caused him to consider his retirement in the summer of 2010. Port Vale did not offer him a new playing contract, but did retain him on the coaching staff.

=== Alvechurch ===
In March 2013, he joined Midland Football Alliance side Alvechurch after agreeing to an offer from the Alvechurch chairman to play until the end of the season.

== Coaching career ==
Twelve months after he joined Port Vale as player-assistant manager in July 2009, Horsfield was offered a contract at the club as full-time assistant manager. Adams said that Horsfield would have a heavier workload over the 2010–11 season, which would include many hours of scouting to "formulate a catalogue of players [and] get to know all the leagues at all levels", and he would retain his playing registration for emergencies.

In December 2010, he was made joint caretaker manager at Vale, along with Mark Grew, following the departure of Adams. Vale were beaten 5–0 by Rotherham United in his first game in charge, but rallied to beat Burton Albion 2–1, before Jim Gannon was appointed manager. Gannon retained Horsfield as his assistant. On the way to a match at Aldershot on 25 February, Gannon left the team bus after an apparent bust-up with Horsfield. The national media reported that Gannon granted Horsfield's request for a day off for family reasons but then wrote to the board complaining about his conduct. Having been shown the letter by a director, Horsfield confronted Gannon over the issue. After an internal inquiry, during which Horsfield stayed away from the club, no disciplinary action was taken against either party. Gannon was sacked on 21 March, and Grew was appointed as caretaker manager with Horsfield as his assistant.

"I have got a couple of business propositions I can go into at the moment and at this stage of my life I feel it is time for a change. I have absolutely loved my time here at Port Vale. I have got on with everybody apart from the previous manager, which is well-documented, but that happens in football and I have just got to look at the future now and look at my family."

— Horsfield speaking on his decision to quit the game.

In July 2011, Horsfield stepped down as assistant manager to concentrate on his coaching qualifications, remaining at Port Vale as a coach. Later in the month he scored in a friendly against Stone Dominoes, but dismissed speculation that he would make a return to the playing side of the game. In December 2011, loan striker Guy Madjo celebrated his first goal for the club by running over to Horsfield on the touchline, "to say thank you for all the finishing (practice) that we have been doing. He has shown me a lot of things that I haven't done in the past. In seven years, I have been so many places, to so many clubs and I haven't done that with anyone else, so I just feel it was a good dedication for him." Horsfield retired completely from football in May 2012 to pursue business interests.

== Personal life ==
He is married to Tina and has four children: Chris, Chloe, Leah and Lexie-Brooke.

In October 2008, Horsfield was diagnosed with testicular cancer, and advised that his playing career was over. As the disease was discovered in its early stages, no chemotherapy or radiotherapy was needed, surgery proved successful and less than two months later he was given the all-clear. Horsfield decided to make his illness public to help spread awareness of the disease and lent his support to a Premier League-backed project launched in 2009 to promote men's health issues. He said: "Getting cancer was something I had to get over. I got it, wanted to beat it and I did. Now I am just glad that I've got another chance in football."

Shortly before he joined Port Vale, Horsfield fell victim to the swine flu pandemic. In January 2013, he received emergency treatment for blood clots on both lungs.

After retiring from football, he began his own building business. He also established the Geoff Horsfield Foundation, a charity which offers accommodation to homeless people.

== Career statistics ==
=== As a player ===
Appearances and goals by club, season and competition
Club	Season	League			FA Cup		League Cup		Other		Total	
Club	Season	Division	Apps	Goals	Apps	Goals	Apps	Goals	Apps	Goals	Apps	Goals
Scarborough	1992–93	Third Division	6	1	0	0	0	0	1 (Note: Appearance in Football League Trophy)	0	7	1
Scarborough	1993–94	Third Division	6	0	1	0	0	0	1	0	8	0
Scarborough	Total		12	1	1	0	0	0	2	0	15	1
Halifax Town	1993–94	Football Conference	9	0	—		—		—		9	0
Guiseley	1994–95	NPL Premier Division	40	22	6	6	—		11 (Note: Four appearances three goals in FA Trophy; three appearances in Yorkshire Electricity Cup; two appearances in Northern Premier League Chairman's Cup; two appearances in West Riding County Cup)	3	57	31
Guiseley	1995–96	NPL Premier Division	18	2	3	3	—		3 (Note: Appearances in West Riding County Cup)	2	24	7
Guiseley	Total		58	24	9	9	—		14	5	81	38
Halifax Town	1996–97	Football Conference	24	9	0	0	—		4 (Note: Two appearances in FA Trophy, one in West Riding County Cup, one in West Riding Senior Cup)	0	28	9
Halifax Town	1997–98	Football Conference	40	30	4	4	—		3 (Note: Appearances in FA Trophy)	0	47	34
Halifax Town	1998–99	Third Division	10	7	—		4	1	0	0	14	8
Halifax Town	Total		74	46	4	4	4	1	7	0	89	51
Fulham	1998–99	Second Division	28	15	6	2	—		0	0	34	17
Fulham	1999–2000	First Division	31	7	3	1	6	6	—		40	14
Fulham	Total		59	22	9	3	6	6	0	0	74	31
Birmingham City	2000–01	First Division	34	7	1	0	6	4	2 (Note: Appearances in Football League play-offs)	1	43	12
Birmingham City	2001–02	First Division	40	11	1	0	3	0	3	1	47	12
Birmingham City	2002–03	Premier League	31	5	0	0	2	0	—		33	5
Birmingham City	2003–04	Premier League	3	0	—		—		—		3	0
Birmingham City	Total		108	23	2	0	11	4	5	2	126	29
Wigan Athletic	2003–04	First Division	16	7	—		1	0	—		17	7
West Bromwich Albion	2003–04	First Division	20	7	1	0	—		—		21	7
West Bromwich Albion	2004–05	Premier League	29	3	2	0	1	1	—		32	4
West Bromwich Albion	2005–06	Premier League	18	4	1	0	1	0	—		20	4
West Bromwich Albion	Total		67	14	4	0	2	1	—		73	15
Sheffield United (loan)	2005–06	Championship	3	0	—		—		—		3	0
Sheffield United	2006–07	Premier League	0	0	0	0	—		—		0	0
Sheffield United	2007–08	Championship	0	0	0	0	2	1	—		2	1
Sheffield United	Total		3	0	0	0	2	1	—		5	1
Leeds United (loan)	2006–07	Championship	14	2	—		1	0	—		15	2
Leicester City (loan)	2006–07	Championship	13	2	—		—		—		13	2
Scunthorpe United (loan)	2007–08	Championship	12	0	—		—		—		12	0
Lincoln City	2008–09	League Two	17	1	—		—		—		17	1
Port Vale	2009–10	League Two	9	0	1	0	2	0	0	0	12	0
Career total			471	142	30	16	29	13	28	7	558	178

=== As a manager ===
Managerial record by team and tenure
Team	From	To	Record					Ref
Team	From	To	P	W	D	L	Win %	Ref
Port Vale (caretaker)	30 December 2010	6 January 2011	2	1	0	1	50.0	
Total			2	1	0	1	50.0	—

== Honours ==
Halifax Town

- Football Conference: 1997–98

Fulham

- Football League Second Division: 1998–99

Birmingham City

- Football League First Division play-offs: 2002
- Football League Cup runner-up: 2000–01

West Bromwich Albion

- Football League First Division second-place promotion: 2003–04

Individual

- Football Conference top scorer: 1997–98
- PFA Team of the Year: 1998–99 Second Division
