= Ronnie Wallwork =

English association football player (born 1977)

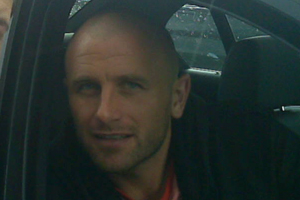
- Wallwork in 2007

Personal information
- Full name: Ronald Wallwork
- Date of birth: 10 September 1977 (age 49)
- Place of birth: Manchester, England
- Height: 5 ft 10 in (1.78 m)
- Position: Midfielder

Youth career
- 1993–1995: Manchester United

Senior career*
Years	Team	Apps	(Gls)
1995–2002	Manchester United	19	(0)
1997–1998	→ Carlisle United (loan)	10	(1)
1998	→ Stockport County (loan)	7	(0)
1999	→ Royal Antwerp (loan)	17	(2)
2002–2008	West Bromwich Albion	93	(2)
2004	→ Bradford City (loan)	5	(2)
2004	→ Bradford City (loan)	2	(2)
2006	→ Barnsley (loan)	2	(0)
2007	→ Huddersfield Town (loan)	16	(3)
2008	Sheffield Wednesday	7	(0)
2014–2018	Ashton United		
Total		178	(12)

International career
1997	England U20	4	(0)
- * Club domestic league appearances and goals

Ronald Wallwork (born 10 September 1977) is an English former professional footballer who played as a midfielder.

An England under-20 international, he began his career at Manchester United, where he made his professional debut in 1997. He never fully established himself in the United first-team however, and was loaned out to Carlisle United and Stockport County. During a further loan spell at Royal Antwerp, he was banned from football for life for attacking a Belgian referee, although the ban was later substantially reduced.

In 2002, Wallwork moved to West Bromwich Albion, where he was the Player of the Year for 2004–05. He was not always a regular in the side however, and spent time on loan at Bradford City, Barnsley and Huddersfield Town. His spell at Barnsley was cut short when he was stabbed several times in a nightclub, suffering wounds to his hand, stomach and back, which caused him to miss more than two months of the 2006–07 season. Wallwork was transferred to Sheffield Wednesday in January 2008, but was released just four months later.

In December 2011, he was sentenced to 15 months in prison after he pleaded guilty to three counts of handling stolen cars. He returned to football in 2014 signing for Ashton United. In March 2021, he received an 18-month suspended sentence and was ordered to complete 200 hours of unpaid work after pleading guilty to inflicting grievous bodily harm.

== Career ==
=== Manchester United ===
Born in Manchester, Wallwork attended The Football Association's School of Excellence at Lilleshall as a teenager. A lifelong Manchester United supporter, he joined the club as an apprentice in April 1993, following a spell playing Sunday league football. Wallwork signed his first trainee contract in July 1994, before turning professional in March 1995. He became a regular in the Manchester United junior sides, making 77 appearances for the club's various youth teams from 1994 to 1997. Wallwork helped United to win the FA Youth Cup in 1995 and was named as the club's Young Player of the Year in 1996. In the summer of 1997, he represented the England under-20 team at the 1997 FIFA World Youth Championship in Malaysia, where he played in all four of his country's matches. England won all three group games to progress to the knockout stages but lost to Argentina in the round of 16.

"I've been a Red all my life and I used to stand on the Stretford End, so to get picked to play for the team you love is an honour. I'd been playing Sunday league football when United came in for me."

— Ronnie Wallwork

By the start of the 1997–98 season, he had become a regular in the Manchester United reserve team and made his senior debut on 25 October 1997, when he came on as a 64th-minute substitute for Gary Pallister in the 7–0 home win against Barnsley. Later that season, Wallwork was loaned out twice: firstly to Carlisle United, where he scored his first goal in professional football, and then to Stockport County. He joined Royal Antwerp on loan during the following season and helped them to reach the play-offs, but their hopes of promotion to the First Division were ended by a defeat to La Louvière. After the match, Wallwork grabbed referee Amand Ancion by the throat, for which he was banned from football for life. Another Manchester United loanee, Danny Higginbotham, was banned for a year for his part in the attack. A Belgian court reduced Wallwork's sentence to a three-year suspension, of which two years were probational, while Higginbotham's ban was reduced to four months. Ancion maintained that Wallwork had grabbed him by the throat and that Higginbotham had headbutted him. Higginbotham always maintained his innocence, stating that he had tried to intervene peacefully after Wallwork had aggressively confronted Ancion. Alex Ferguson believed the player's innocence and handed both players four-year contracts. The remaining twelve months of Wallwork's ban applied only in Belgium, rather than the worldwide ban given under the initial ruling.

The 1999–2000 season saw Wallwork make further progress at Manchester United as he made seven appearances for the first-team, mostly as a defensive midfielder. Then, in 2000–01, he amassed enough league appearances to qualify for a Premier League winner's medal. However, his spell in the United first-team was short-lived, as the signings of centre-back Laurent Blanc and central midfielder Juan Sebastián Verón made Wallwork surplus to requirements. He made his final appearance for United on 26 January 2002, playing 61 minutes of the FA Cup Fourth Round match against Middlesbrough before being replaced by Ryan Giggs. In his seven years at United, Wallwork played just 28 times, and in the summer of 2002 his contract was not renewed.

=== West Bromwich Albion ===
"Ronnie is the best Bosman transfer of the summer [of 2002]. He was a marvellous player at Old Trafford but he was unfortunate that he never had a set position. He came here as a promising young centre-half, we farmed him out to get him some experience, and ended up playing him in a variety of positions, all of which he did well in."

— Alex Ferguson

In July 2002, Wallwork moved on to West Bromwich Albion on a Bosman free transfer, becoming the first player signed by Albion following their promotion to the Premier League. Manchester United manager Sir Alex Ferguson called him the "best Bosman of the summer". Before the season started, Wallwork and his Albion teammates were involved in a dispute over bonuses with the club's new board of directors. According to his agent, the player was said to be "shocked and disturbed" at the prospect of an 80% reduction in bonuses compared with that offered by the outgoing board. Wallwork made his Albion debut as a substitute in a 3–1 home defeat to Leeds United on 24 August, and he went on to play in 27 of Albion's 38 Premier League games in 2002–03. Following the death of his mother in February 2003, he and his teammates each wore a black armband for the match against Bolton Wanderers. The club was eventually relegated at the end of the campaign and Wallwork fell out of favour during 2003–04, taking part in just five league matches during the first half of the season.

In January 2004, he joined Bradford City on an initial month-long loan, during which time he scored in his first and last games. Albion initially refused an extension to the loan, citing concerns over the financial situation at Bradford, who were on the verge of administration. A second loan deal for a further two months at Bradford was agreed shortly afterwards, and Wallwork scored a further two goals, taking his total with Bradford to four in seven games. He attributed his new-found goalscoring form to tactical instructions from manager Bryan Robson, who told him to get forward more often, in contrast to his deeper-lying role at West Bromwich Albion. A broken toe sustained in a match against Rotherham United meant that he returned earlier than scheduled, however. While Wallwork was sidelined for six weeks, his West Bromwich Albion teammates secured promotion back to the Premier League at the first attempt.

Back in the top division, Wallwork was still unable to force his way back into Albion manager Gary Megson's matchday squad. However, when Bryan Robson – who had been Wallwork's manager at Bradford – replaced Megson in November 2004, Wallwork became an integral part of the team. Robson referred to Wallwork as "an intelligent footballer" who could "sit, pass the ball and change the direction of a game" from central midfield. Wallwork returned to the team the following month and was ever-present throughout the second half of the season, scoring his first Albion goal in a 2–0 home win over Manchester City on 22 January 2005. The club successfully avoided relegation, retaining their top-flight status on the final day of the season, when they beat Portsmouth. Albion became the first Premier League club to avoid relegation having been bottom of the table at Christmas. For his efforts, Wallwork was named as Albion's Player of the Year for 2004–05. In May 2005, he signed a new contract, to keep him at Albion until June 2007.

"I was Player of the Year one minute at West Brom, the next I was out of the team and then out of the club. Things can change very quickly in football, it comes with the territory."

— Ronnie Wallwork

The following season Wallwork played in 31 out of 38 Premier League games, but was unable to prevent Albion's relegation to the Championship. He nevertheless signed a new two-year deal with the club in August 2006. He remained a regular in the side during the early part of the 2006–07 season, but following the appointment of Bryan Robson's successor Tony Mowbray in October, Wallwork played just once more for the club. Mowbray described Wallwork as "a very good professional", but preferred a number of other midfielders ahead of him when selecting the team, moving Jonathan Greening from a wide position into the central midfield holding role previously occupied by Wallwork. In order to continue playing first-team football, Wallwork joined Barnsley on loan on 22 November 2006; the loan spell was due to last until 1 January 2007, though West Bromwich Albion had a recall option after 28 days.

On 30 November 2006, Wallwork was attacked while on a night out with his girlfriend Amy Broadbent at the Sugar Lounge night club in Manchester. He was approached by a former boyfriend of Broadbent, Robert Rimmer, who asked him to leave. When Wallwork refused to do so, Rimmer used a fish knife to stab the footballer seven times in the hand, back and stomach. After being rushed to hospital, Wallwork's condition was said to be stable and his injuries were not thought to be life-threatening. Police investigating the stabbing described the attack as "not random". They later named 20-year-old Rimmer as the suspect and appealed for him to contact them. Rimmer handed himself into a police station in Manchester and was arrested on 7 December. In December 2007, Rimmer, from Gorton, Manchester, was jailed for 5 1/2 years for stabbing Wallwork after admitting wounding with intent at Manchester Crown Court. Rimmer's friend, Charles Ebbrell, a 27-year-old from Denton, Greater Manchester, was given a suspended jail sentence after he admitted punching Wallwork during the attack. Wallwork was released from hospital on 10 December 2006, the same day that Barnsley and West Bromwich Albion faced each other in a league game; Barnsley supporters displayed a "Get well soon Ronnie" banner during the match. After returning to light training in late January, Wallwork made his comeback from the stabbing on 21 February 2007, playing the full 90 minutes in a West Bromwich Albion reserve team game against Walsall.

=== Huddersfield Town ===
Wallwork was loaned out to Huddersfield Town on 27 September 2007, joining up once more with manager Andy Ritchie, who had brought him to Barnsley the season before. He made his Huddersfield debut in a 2–0 home win over Luton Town on 29 September 2007. On 20 October, he scored his first goal for Town in a match against Oldham Athletic, which finished 1–1. His loan was extended by another month on 29 October. He was also given permission by West Bromwich Albion to play in Town's FA Cup first round tie against Accrington Stanley on 10 November. Wallwork's loan was extended on 22 November until 29 December, the maximum loan period of 93 days permitted under league rules, when he returned to West Bromwich Albion.

=== Sheffield Wednesday ===
On 11 January 2008, Wallwork signed for Sheffield Wednesday on a free transfer until the end of the season, with a view to an extension afterwards. He made his debut the following day, coming on as a half-time substitute for Steve Watson in a 1–0 defeat away at Cardiff City. He lost his place in the team to new signing Adam Bolder, and although he came on as an early substitute for Graham Kavanagh against Charlton Athletic on 12 February 2008, he did not play for nearly another month until his appearance in a 2–1 victory against Queens Park Rangers. Wallwork played just seven games for Wednesday, who released him on 14 May 2008. He trained with former club Carlisle United in August 2008, but failed to earn a permanent contract. The player "wasn't strong enough or fit enough for the levels we're at", according to Carlisle manager John Ward.

In 2014, he returned to football, signing for Ashton United.

== International career ==
In the summer of 1997, he represented the England under-20 team at the 1997 FIFA World Youth Championship in Malaysia, where he played in all four of his country's matches. England won all three group games to progress to the knockout stages but lost to Argentina in the round of 16.

== Personal life ==
Wallwork runs a clothes business, D&R Designers, in Failsworth, Greater Manchester. In 2007, the business was burgled, with hundreds of pounds worth of goods stolen.

=== Controversies ===
On 30 November 2006, Wallwork was stabbed multiple times during a brawl in a Manchester nightclub, by his girlfriend's ex-partner.

On 18 August 2008, Wallwork was seen to be talking on his mobile phone while driving his BMW 525, in Failsworth. He pleaded guilty to the offence five months later and was fined £35, ordered to pay £35 costs and a £15 victim surcharge, and was given three penalty points on his licence.

In late 2010, whilst staking out the 10 Arches scrapyard in Clayton, Manchester, police on Operation Solomon who were attempting to track down a gang of armed robbers who had shot a Tesco security guard in Preston, noticed that Wallwork had his own, entirely separate, criminal enterprise. On 18 January 2011, Wallwork was charged with concealing criminal property in connection with offences relating to stolen cars. On 1 July 2011, he pleaded guilty at Preston Crown Court to three counts of handling stolen cars. During the trial, it emerged in defence that Wallwork had had financial difficulties following his retirement from football, resulting in two failed business ventures, and police as a result believed he had got caught up in the criminal sub-culture of Newton Heath. Clarke Carlisle, then chairman of the Professional Footballers' Association, said that "Ronnie has been offered the full support of the union previously, and we will continue to be there as and when he calls upon us." Judge Simon Newell jailed Wallwork for 15 months on 5 December 2011, calling the set-up "professional and sophisticated".

In February 2021, Wallwork, along with co-defendant David Garner, pleaded guilty to inflicting grievous bodily harm in December 2019. The following month both defendants received an 18-month suspended sentence at Manchester Minshull Street Crown Court and were ordered to complete 200 hours of unpaid work, complete a rehabilitation programme and pay the victim £500 compensation.

== Career statistics ==
Appearances and goals by club, season and competition
Club	Season	League			FA Cup		League Cup		Europe		Other		Total	
Club	Season	Division	Apps	Goals	Apps	Goals	Apps	Goals	Apps	Goals	Apps	Goals	Apps	Goals
Manchester United	1997–98	Premier League	1	0	0	0	0	0	0	0	0	0	1	0
Manchester United	1998–99	Premier League	0	0	0	0	1	0	0	0	0	0	1	0
Manchester United	1999–2000	Premier League	5	0	0	0	1	0	0	0	1	0	7	0
Manchester United	2000–01	Premier League	12	0	1	0	2	0	1	0	0	0	16	0
Manchester United	2001–02	Premier League	1	0	1	0	1	0	0	0	0	0	3	0
Manchester United	Total		19	0	2	0	5	0	1	0	1	0	28	0
Carlisle United (loan)	1997–98	Second Division	10	1	0	0	0	0	–		2	0	12	1
Stockport County (loan)	1997–98	First Division	7	0	0	0	0	0	–		–		7	0
Royal Antwerp (loan)	1998–99	Belgian Second Division	17	2	0	0	0	0	–		3	0	20	2
West Bromwich Albion	2002–03	Premier League	27	0	2	0	1	0	–		–		30	0
West Bromwich Albion	2003–04	First Division	5	0	0	0	2	0	–		–		7	0
West Bromwich Albion	2004–05	Premier League	20	1	3	0	0	0	–		–		23	1
West Bromwich Albion	2005–06	Premier League	31	0	2	0	2	0	–		–		35	0
West Bromwich Albion	2006–07	Championship	10	1	0	0	2	1	–		–		12	2
West Bromwich Albion	2007–08	Championship	0	0	0	0	0	0	–		–		0	0
West Bromwich Albion	Total		93	2	7	0	7	1	–		–		107	3
Bradford City (loan)	2003–04	First Division	7	4	0	0	0	0	–		–		7	4
Barnsley (loan)	2006–07	Championship	2	0	0	0	0	0	–		–		2	0
Huddersfield Town (loan)	2007–08	League One	16	3	2	0	0	0	–		–		18	3
Sheffield Wednesday	2007–08	Championship	7	0	0	0	0	0	–		–		7	0
Career total			178	12	11	0	12	1	1	0	6	0	208	13

== Honours ==
Manchester United

- Premier League: 2000–01
- Intercontinental Cup: 1999

Individual

- Jimmy Murphy Young Player of the Year: 1995–96
- West Bromwich Albion Player of the Year: 2004–05
