= Robert Dobie =

Robert Dobie may refer to:

- Robert Dobie (footballer) (1874-1917), Scottish footballer, see List of Bury F.C. players (1–24 appearances)
- Gil Dobie (Robert Gilmour Doboe, 1878-1948), American college football player and coach
- Scott Dobie (Robert Scott Dobie, born 1978), English footballer
