= Artim Šakiri =

Macedonian footballer (born 1973)

Personal information
- Date of birth: 23 September 1973 (age 53)
- Place of birth: Livada, SR Macedonia, Yugoslavia
- Height: 1.77 m (5 ft 10 in)
- Position: Midfielder

Youth career
- Dinamo Livadа
- Karaorman

Senior career*
Years	Team	Apps	(Gls)
1991–1994	Karaorman		
1994–2000	Vardar	87	(21)
1997–1998	→ Halmstad (loan)	43	(8)
2000	→ TeBe Berlin (loan)	14	(0)
2000–2001	FC HIT	19	(3)
2000–2001	Korotan	2	(2)
2001–2002	Malatyaspor	23	(3)
2002–2003	CSKA Sofia	20	(5)
2003–2005	West Bromwich Albion	28	(1)
2005–2006	AaB Aalborg	12	(3)
2006	Inter Turku	5	(3)
2007	FC Vaduz	10	(0)
2007	Shkëndija	25	(7)
2008	Besa	8	(1)
2008–2009	Qarabağ	22	(7)
Total		318	(64)

International career
1996–2006	Macedonia	73	(15)

Managerial career
- 2012–2013: Shkëndija
- 2014–2015: Kukësi
- 2016–2019: Pembroke Athleta
- 2019–2020: Flamurtari
- 2021: Schaffhausen
- 2022: Shkëndija
- * Club domestic league appearances and goals

Artim Šakiri (Macedonian: Артим Шаќири, Albanian: Artim Shaqiri; born 23 September 1973) is a Macedonian football manager and a former midfielder from North Macedonia. He is considered to be one of the best players in the history of the Macedonian national team. While managing Kukësi in 2014, Šakiri was ranked as the best manager of the Kategoria Superiore and the second best manager of Albanian origin in the world.

== Biography ==
Šakiri was born to an Albanian family in Livada (Macedonian: Ливада), a village near Struga. In his youth, he played football for his village squad (FK Dinamo Livada).

== Club career ==
In 1997, he moved from Vardar to Swedish side Halmstads BK, a team that won the Swedish premier league Allsvenskan the same year. He played alongside developing star Freddie Ljungberg.

In 2003, he moved from Bulgarian club CSKA Sofia to West Bromwich Albion in England. He made his debut in a 4–1 defeat away at local rivals Walsall. In his first home league match for Albion, Šakiri scored a spectacular long-range goal, helping his team to a 4–1 win over Burnley. It was, however, his only goal for the club. He made 30 appearances during 2003–04, but the next season he only played three games and left the club. He was set to move to Burnley, but the move fell through as his work permit wasn't renewed. Instead, Šakiri went to AaB in Denmark. He was released by AaB in 2006. In Autumn 2006, Šakiri signed for Finnish club FC Inter. He made five Veikkausliiga appearances and scored three times, but his contract was not renewed. In 2007, he signed for FC Vaduz. At the beginning of the season 2008 he has signed for Azerbaijani side Qarabağ FK.

=== Career statistics ===
Club performance			League		Cup		League Cup		Continental		Total	
Season	Club	League	Apps	Goals	Apps	Goals	Apps	Goals	Apps	Goals	Apps	Goals
1992–93	FK Karaorman	2. MFL					-		-			
1993–94	FK Karaorman	1. MFL					-		-			
1994–95	FK Vardar	1. MFL	23	3			-		0	0		
1995–96	FK Vardar	1. MFL	26	10			-		4	0		
1996–97	FK Vardar	1. MFL	13	2			-		4	0		
1997	Halmstad (loan)	Allsvenskan	19	4			-				19	4
1998	Halmstad (loan)	Allsvenskan	24	4			-		2	1	26	5
1998–99	FK Vardar	1. MFL	7	2			-		-			
1999–2000	FK Vardar	1. MFL	9	2			-		1	0	10	2
1999–2000	Tennis Borussia Berlin (loan)	2. Bundesliga	14	0			-		-		14	0
2000–01	FK Vardar	1. MFL	8	2			-		-			
2000–01	Gorica	1. SNL	14	3			-		0	0	14	3
2001–02	Gorica	1. SNL	5	0			-		2	0	7	0
2001–02	Korotan Prevalje	1. SNL	2	2			-		-		2	2
2001–02	Malatyaspor	Süper Lig	23	3			-		-		23	3
2002–03	CSKA Sofia	A PFG	20	5			-		3	1	23	6
2003–04	West Bromwich Albion	Championship	25	1	1	0	4	0	-		30	1
2004–05	West Bromwich Albion	Premier League	3	0	0	0	0	0	-		3	0
2005–06	AaB	Superligaen	12	3			-		-		12	3
2006	Inter Turku	Veikkausliiga	5	3					-		5	3
2006–07	FC Vaduz	Challenge League	10	0			-		0	0	10	0
2007–08	Shkëndija	1. MFL					-		-			
2007–08	Besa Kavajë	Albanian Superliga	8	1			-		0	0	8	1
2008–09	Qarabağ	APL	22	7			-		-		22	7
Career total			223	40	1	0	4	0	16	2	245	42

== International career ==
Šakiri made his debut for Macedonia in a May 1996 friendly match against Bulgaria, coming on as a second-half substitute for Sašo Miloševski, and has been capped 73 times, scoring 15 goals. He has been captain of the team for many of those years. In October 2002, during UEFA Euro 2004 qualifying, he scored a goal directly from a corner kick against England.

His final international was a November 2006 European Championship qualification match against Russia.

=== International goals ===
#	Date	Venue	Opponent	Score	Result	Competition
1	11 October 1997	Gradski Stadium, Skopje, Republic of Macedonia	Lithuania	1–0	1–2	1998 FIFA World Cup qualification
2	6 September 1998	Gradski Stadium, Skopje, Republic of Macedonia	Malta	3–0	4–0	UEFA Euro 2000 qualifying
3	6 September 1998	Gradski Stadium, Skopje, Republic of Macedonia	Malta	4–0	4–0	UEFA Euro 2000 qualifying
4	8 September 1998	Gradski Stadium, Skopje, Republic of Macedonia	FR Yugoslavia	1–4	2–4	UEFA Euro 2000 qualifying
5	7 June 2000	Azadi Stadium, Teheran, Iran	South Korea	1–2	1–2	Friendly
6	2 June 2001	Gradski Stadium, Skopje, Republic of Macedonia	Moldova	1–1	2–2	2002 FIFA World Cup qualification
7	6 June 2001	Bursa Atatürk Stadium, Bursa, Turkey	Turkey	0–1	3–3	2002 FIFA World Cup qualification
8	27 March 2002	Stadion Grbavica, Sarajevo, Bosnia and Herzegovina	Bosnia and Herzegovina	3–1	4–4	Friendly
9	27 March 2002	Stadion Grbavica, Sarajevo, Bosnia and Herzegovina	Bosnia and Herzegovina	4–3	4–4	Friendly
10	27 March 2002	Stadion Grbavica, Sarajevo, Bosnia and Herzegovina	Bosnia and Herzegovina	4–4	4–4	Friendly
11	21 August 2002	Gradski Stadium, Skopje, Republic of Macedonia	Malta	2–0	5–0	Friendly
12	21 August 2002	Gradski Stadium, Skopje, Republic of Macedonia	Malta	4–0	5–0	Friendly
13	16 October 2002	St Mary's Stadium, Southampton, England	England	0–1	2–2	UEFA Euro 2004 qualifying
14	11 June 2003	BJK İnönü Stadium, Istanbul, Turkey	Turkey	0–2	3–2	UEFA Euro 2004 qualifying
15	18 August 2004	Gradski Stadium, Skopje, Republic of Macedonia	Armenia	2–0	3–0	2006 FIFA World Cup qualification

== Coaching career ==
He was hired as a manager of Swiss Challenge League club FC Schaffhausen on 1 September 2021. He was not able to obtain the Swiss work permit in a prompt manner, and on 17 September the club hired a different manager.

== Honours ==
FK Vardar

- First League: 1994–95
- Macedonian Cup: 1994–95, 1998–99

Halmstad

- Allsvenskan: 1997

CSKA Sofia

- A Group: 2002–03

Qarabağ

- Azerbaijan Cup: 2008–09

Sporting positions
Preceded by Toni Micevski	Macedonia captain 2002–2005	Succeeded by Goce Sedloski
