= Thomas Gaardsøe =

Danish footballer (born 1979)

Personal information
- Full name: Thomas Gaardsøe Christensen
- Date of birth: 23 November 1979 (age 46)
- Place of birth: Gassum, Denmark
- Height: 6 ft 2 in (1.88 m)
- Position: Centre back

Youth career
- Purhus IF
- Randers Freja

Senior career*
Years	Team	Apps	(Gls)
1997–2001	AaB	92	(6)
2001–2003	Ipswich Town	41	(5)
2003–2006	West Bromwich Albion	81	(4)
2009	AaB	6	(0)
2010–2012	Esbjerg	22	(0)
Total		242	(15)

International career
1998	Denmark U19	2	(0)
1998–2001	Denmark U21	10	(1)
2003–2004	Denmark	2	(1)
- * Club domestic league appearances and goals

Thomas Gaardsøe Christensen (Danish pronunciation: [ˈtsʰʌmæs ˈkɒˀsøː]; born 23 November 1979) is a Danish former professional footballer.

Gaardsøe most notably won the 1999 Danish Superliga with Aalborg Boldspilklub, and played abroad for English clubs Ipswich Town and West Bromwich Albion. He played two matches and scored a single goal for the Danish national team.

== Club career ==
=== Early career ===
Son of former Randers Freja player Per Gaardsøe, Thomas Gaardsøe played his youth football at Freja. His name first caught the headlines when he was a part of the winning team in the 1994 and 1995 editions of the Danish nationwide school football tournament, scoring in both finals.

=== AaB ===
He moved to Aalborg Boldspilklub (AaB) in the Danish Superliga championship, and made his senior debut in June 1997. Despite occasional good performances, he had a hard time forcing his way into the AaB starting line-up in his role as central midfielder. He made his AaB breakthrough in spring 2001, as a replacement for the injured central defender Torben Boye. He impressed in his new role at AaB, as he was once more called up for the under-21 national team.

=== Ipswich Town ===
In the summer 2001, he was sold to English club Ipswich Town in the FA Premier League championship in a transfer deal worth £1.3 million. He did not play much in his first season, but managed to score his first goal for Ipswich against Sunderland in December 2001. After his first season at the club, Ipswich suffered relegation into the English First Division. In the First Division, Gaardsøe became an important member for the squad, scoring six goals in all competitions of the 2002–2003 season.

=== West Bromwich Albion ===
Gaardsøe was sold in the summer of 2003 to First Division rivals West Bromwich Albion. His first appearance came in a 4–0 thrashing of Brentford in the Football League Cup in August 2003. He scored his first goal for Albion in a 4–1 victory over his former club Ipswich on 13 September 2003. He went on to score 3 more goals in the season, including vital winners against Sheffield United in February and Wigan Athletic in March 2004. Gaardsøe was an ever-present in Albion's promotion winning team and he was named "Player of the Year" by the supporters who, in turn, dressed up as Vikings in his honour for the away match at Reading on 1 May 2004.

Most of Gaardsøe's 2005–2006 season was hampered by a serious groin injury, which originated in a pre-match warm-up before an April 2005 game against Manchester United. He only played seven league games in a season which ended in Albion's relegation to the First Division. In the beginning of the 2006–2007 season, the continued injury problems made him consider a premature retirement from football. On 19 December 2006 Gaardsøe announced his retirement from the game, having been unable to regain full fitness from the groin operation in the summer.

=== Return to football ===
Two and a half years later he returned to football after having fully recovered from his injury. This time he signed for his childhood club Aalborg BK. However, Gaardsøe did not succeed in establishing himself in the AaB squad and, in order to find regular first team football, he signed a contract with Danish superliga rivals Esbjerg from January 2010.

After his contract ended with Esbjerg fB in the summer of 2012, he searched for a new club. After two months, on 29 August 2012, Gaardsøe retired from football, being unable to find a new club.

== International career ==
Gaardsøe gained his first international experience in 1998, playing two games for the Danish under-19 national team. He also won 10 caps for the Danish under-21 national team between 1998 and 2001, scoring once.

He won his first international cap in November 2003, coming on as a substitute in Denmark's 3–2 victory over England. He scored his first national team goal in his second match, a 5–1 win against Poland in August 2004.

== Career statistics ==
Appearances and goals by club, season and competition
Club	Season	League			National Cup		League Cup		Other		Total	
Club	Season	Division	Apps	Goals	Apps	Goals	Apps	Goals	Apps	Goals	Apps	Goals
AaB	1996–97	Danish Superliga	1	0	0	0	—		0	0	1	0
AaB	1997–98	Danish Superliga	6	1	0	0	—		0	0	6	1
AaB	1998–99	Danish Superliga	17	2	0	0	—		—		17	2
AaB	1999–00	Danish Superliga	18	2	0	0	—		0	0	18	2
AaB	2000–01	Danish Superliga	20	0	0	0	—		0	0	20	0
AaB	2001–02	Danish Superliga	4	0	0	0	—		0	0	4	0
AaB	Total		66	5	0	0	0	0	0	0	66	5
Ipswich Town	2001–02	Premier League	4	1	0	0	1	0	1 (Note: Appearance(s) in UEFA Cup)	0	6	1
Ipswich Town	2002–03	First Division	37	4	1	1	2	1	3	0	43	6
Ipswich Town	Total		41	5	1	1	3	1	4	0	49	7
West Bromwich Albion	2003–04	First Division	45	4	1	0	5	0	—		51	4
West Bromwich Albion	2004–05	Premier League	29	0	1	0	1	0	—		31	0
West Bromwich Albion	2005–06	Premier League	7	0	0	0	2	0	—		9	0
West Bromwich Albion	Total		81	4	2	0	8	0	0	0	91	4
AaB	2009–10	Danish Superliga	6	0	0	0	—		0	0	6	0
Esbjerg	2009–10	Danish Superliga	12	0	0	0	—		0	0	12	0
Esbjerg	2010–11	Danish Superliga	10	0	0	0	—		0	0	10	0
Esbjerg	Total		22	0	0	0	0	0	0	0	22	0
Career total			216	14	3	1	11	1	4	0	234	16

=== International ===
Appearances and goals by national team and year
National team	Year	Apps	Goals
Denmark	2003	1	0
Denmark	2004	1	1
Total		2	1

=== International goals ===
Denmark score listed first, score column indicates score after each Gaardsøe goal.

International goals by date, venue, cap, opponent, score, result and competition
No.	Date	Venue	Cap	Opponent	Score	Result	Competition	Ref
1	18 August 2004	Stadion Miejski, Poznań, Poland	2	Poland	3–0	5–1	Friendly	

== Honours ==
AaB

- Danish Superliga: 1998–99

West Bromwich Albion

- Football League First Division runner-up: 2003–04

Individual

- West Bromwich Albion Player of the Year: 2003–04
