= Lloyd Dyer =

English footballer (born 1982)

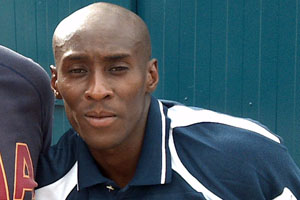
- Dyer in 2009

Personal information
- Full name: Lloyd Richard Dyer
- Date of birth: 13 September 1982 (age 44)
- Place of birth: Birmingham, England
- Height: 5 ft 8 in (1.73 m)
- Position: Winger

Youth career
- 1999–2001: Aston Villa

Senior career*
Years	Team	Apps	(Gls)
2001–2006	West Bromwich Albion	21	(2)
2003	→ Kidderminster Harriers (loan)	7	(1)
2005	→ Coventry City (loan)	6	(0)
2005	→ Queens Park Rangers (loan)	15	(0)
2006	Millwall	6	(0)
2006–2008	Milton Keynes Dons	86	(16)
2008–2014	Leicester City	230	(30)
2014–2016	Watford	14	(1)
2015	→ Birmingham City (loan)	18	(1)
2016	Burnley	3	(0)
2016–2018	Burton Albion	80	(14)
2018–2019	Bolton Wanderers	7	(0)
2019–2020	Burton Albion	5	(0)
Total		498	(65)
- * Club domestic league appearances and goals

Lloyd Richard Dyer (born 13 September 1982) is an English former professional footballer who played as a winger. During his 18 years as a professional, Dyer spent the majority of his career in the Football League, most notably with West Bromwich Albion and later Leicester City, spending six years with the latter and earning promotion to the Premier League with both clubs in 2004 and 2014 respectively.

Dyer began his senior career with West Bromwich Albion and spent subsequent loan spells with Kidderminster Harriers, Coventry City and Queens Park Rangers before joining Millwall in the summer of 2006. After half a season, the two sides parted by mutual consent, but Dyer would spend the rest of the campaign without a club due to the transfer window having already closed. He later moved on to Milton Keynes Dons for the next season, where he spent two years, helping the Dons earn promotion to League One in his final season at the club. In 2008, he signed for Leicester City, where he played for six seasons and was a part of the sides that earned promotion to the Championship in 2008, and later to the Premier League as second-tier champions in 2014. Following Leicester's promotion, he joined Watford but struggled to break into the first team regularly and spent the latter part of the 2014–15 season on loan at Birmingham City. After being released by Watford, Dyer signed for Burnley in February 2016 until the end of the season. He joined Burton Albion in July 2016 and spent two seasons at the club before moving on to Bolton Wanderers. After a brief return to Burton Albion in 2019, Dyer announced his retirement from the professional game in September 2020.

== Career ==
=== West Bromwich Albion ===
Dyer started his career with the Aston Villa youth system in 1999, before joining West Bromwich Albion in July 2001. He made his Albion debut in a 3–1 League Cup defeat away at Wigan Athletic on 2 October 2002, but it was the only first team match he played in 2002–03. In September 2003 he spent a month on loan to Kidderminster Harriers. He turned down an extension to the loan, instead opting to fight for his place in the Albion team. This eventually paid off, as during the second half of the 2003–04 season, he played a large part in West Brom's promotion back to the Premier League. Dyer's exciting and pacey substitute appearances often inspired the team, and earned him a new contract in the summer of 2004. However, it was still not enough to cement a regular first-team starting place, and in March 2005 he was loaned out to Coventry City. In September 2005 he went on loan again, this time to Queens Park Rangers.

=== Millwall ===
Dyer left West Bromwich Albion for Millwall during the January 2006 transfer window, but was released just two months later for personal reasons. Due to the transfer window having already closed, Dyer was unable to sign for another club for the remainder of the season. He had a trial with Derby County, with whom he trained, but the Rams elected not to sign him. He instead joined Milton Keynes Dons, signing a two-year contract in July 2006.

=== Milton Keynes Dons ===
His performances during October 2007 earned him the League Two Player of the Month award. Awards panel chairman Chris Kamara said "One of Lloyd Dyer's great strengths is his energy; he's able to motor up and down the left side all day and provides terrific service to his strikers. He's also added goals to his game this month". Dyer received the first red card of his career on 3 November in a 1–1 draw with Wycombe Wanderers. He scored twice in the Dons' 5–0 home win over Accrington Stanley on 8 December, earning himself a place in the League Two Team of the Week. On 26 April 2008, Dyer set up one goal and scored another as Milton Keynes beat Bradford City 2–1, a result that confirmed the Dons as League Two champions.

=== Leicester City ===
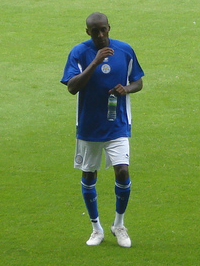
Dyer playing for Leicester City in 2010

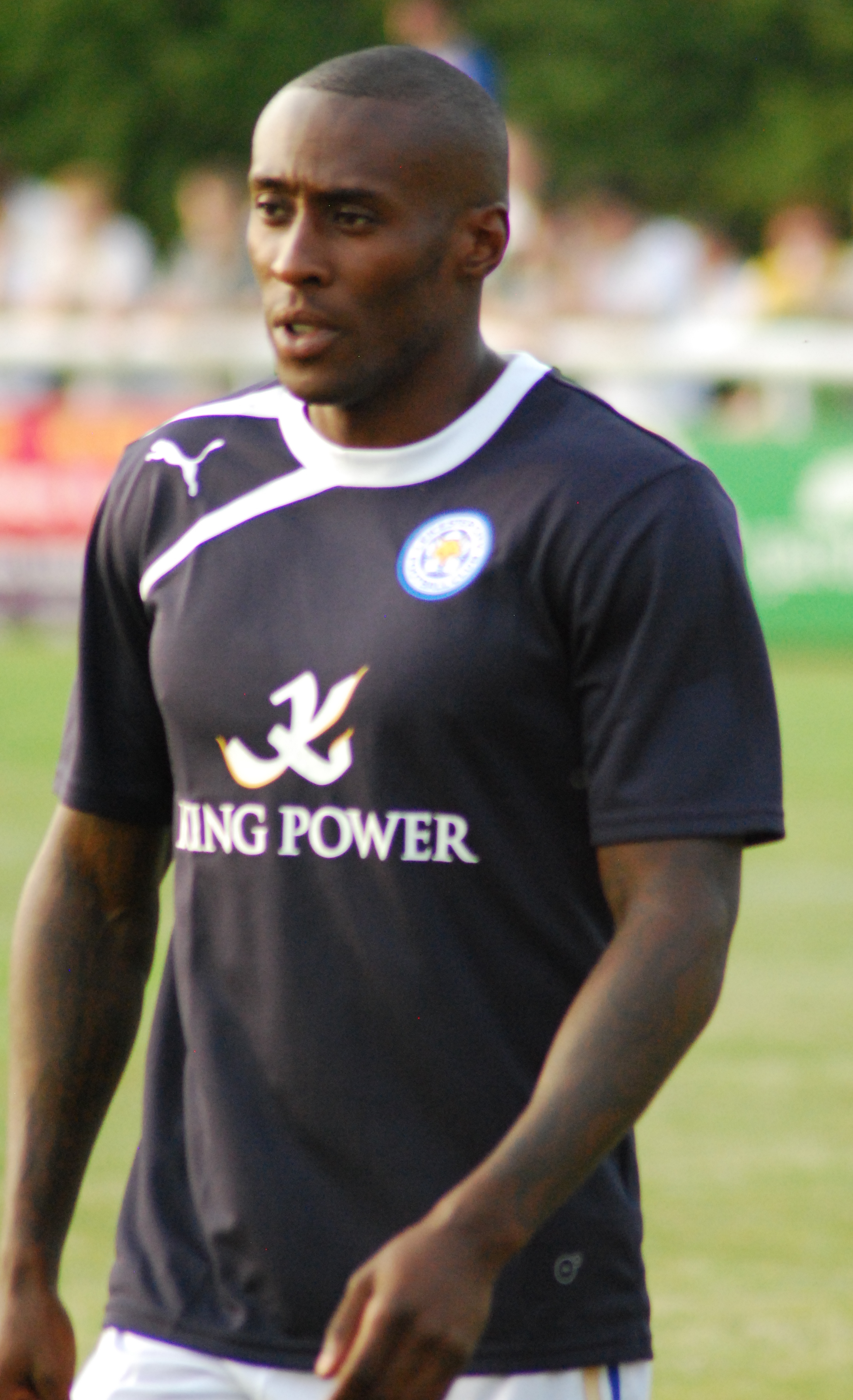
Dyer training with Leicester City in 2013

On 1 July 2008, Dyer signed a three-year contract with Leicester City on a free transfer, becoming manager Nigel Pearson's second signing after Michael Morrison. He made his debut on the opening day of the 2008–09 season in a 2–0 win over his former club Milton Keynes Dons on 9 August. He scored his first two goals for Leicester in a 4–0 win over Cheltenham Town on 30 August. Dyer was in blistering form, scoring ten league goals to help Leicester secure their promotion as League One champions.

He scored his first goal of the 2009–10 season in a 1–0 win over Middlesbrough at the Riverside Stadium on 29 September 2009. On 6 February 2010, Dyer scored the winning goal in a 2–1 win over Blackpool, helping Leicester to their first victory at Bloomfield Road in 73 years.

Dyer committed his long-term future to Leicester in September 2010 by signing a new four-year deal, keeping him at the club until June 2014.

Dyer was in fantastic form when Leicester beat Ipswich Town 6–0 at the King Power Stadium. He won a penalty, set up goals for Anthony Knockaert and Marko Futacs as well as scoring one himself. Assistant manager Craig Shakespeare praised Dyer after the match by saying he was playing some of the best football of his career.

On 27 August 2013, Dyer captained Leicester City for the first time in the 5–2 League Cup victory against Carlisle United and also scored the second goal as well as turning provider for Anthony Knockaert for his goal. He was given Man of the Match.

On 22 April 2014 he was the lone goalscorer in Leicester's 1–0 win over Bolton Wanderers, making them the champions of the 2013–14 Championship.

=== Watford ===
Despite being offered an extension to his contract at Leicester, Dyer signed for Championship club Watford on a three-year deal on 12 June 2014. He made his debut on the opening day of the 2014–15 season, replacing Daniel Pudil in the 83rd minute of a 3–0 home win against Bolton Wanderers. Three days later, on 12 August, he scored the only goal in Watford's 1–0 League Cup victory at Stevenage. On 19 August, Dyer scored his first league goal for Watford in a 2–0 win at Rotherham United, and following his goal appeared to shout abuse towards the bench at manager Giuseppe Sannino. On 2 February 2016, Dyer was freed from the remainder of his contract with Watford.

=== Birmingham City (loan) ===
Dyer joined fellow Championship club Birmingham City on 19 January 2015 on loan for the rest of the season. He made an eventful debut. Replacing the rested Demarai Gray in the starting eleven for the FA Cup visit of West Bromwich Albion, his centre was steered past goalkeeper Boaz Myhill by Jonathan Grounds for Birmingham's goal in the 2–1 defeat, and in the second half, he collided with Myhill who injured a finger and had to be replaced. He scored his first goal for Birmingham in the last home match of the season to give his team a 1–0 victory over Charlton Athletic, and finished the season with 19 appearances.

=== Burnley ===
Dyer signed for Championship club Burnley on 15 February 2016 on a short-term deal until the end of the season.

=== Burton Albion ===
On 25 July 2016, Dyer signed a one-year contract with Burton Albion, newly promoted to the Championship. He made his debut in Burton's first fixture of the season and scored their second goal in a 4–3 defeat against Nottingham Forest. At the end of the season, he signed a new one-year contract with the club.

At the end of the 2017–18 season, following their relegation, Dyer was initially offered a new contract by Albion, but his departure from the club was confirmed in July.

=== Bolton Wanderers ===
On 24 September 2018, he signed a short-term contract with Championship club Bolton Wanderers. He made his debut for Wanderers on 6 October 2018 against Blackburn Rovers as a second-half substitute for Craig Noone.

=== Return to Burton Albion ===
On 25 September 2019, Dyer returned to Burton Albion signing a short-term deal and made his debut later that day as a substitute in the 2-0 EFL Cup win over AFC Bournemouth.

== Personal life ==
Dyer was born in Birmingham, West Midlands. He is the brother of former Montserrat international Wayne Dyer.

His son, Kiano is also a footballer who is currently playing for Premier League club Chelsea.

== Career statistics ==
Appearances and goals by club, season and competition
Club	Season	League			FA Cup		League Cup		Other		Total	
Club	Season	Division	Apps	Goals	Apps	Goals	Apps	Goals	Apps	Goals	Apps	Goals
West Bromwich Albion	2002–03	Premier League	0	0	0	0	1	0	—		1	0
West Bromwich Albion	2003–04	First Division	17	2	1	0	0	0	—		18	2
West Bromwich Albion	2004–05	Premier League	4	0	0	0	1	0	—		5	0
West Bromwich Albion	2005–06	Premier League	0	0	1	0	0	0	—		1	0
West Bromwich Albion	Total		21	2	2	0	2	0	0	0	25	2
Kidderminster Harriers (loan)	2003–04	Third Division	7	1	—		—		—		7	1
Coventry City (loan)	2004–05	Championship	6	0	—		—		—		6	0
Queens Park Rangers (loan)	2005–06	Championship	15	0	—		—		—		15	0
Millwall	2005–06	Championship	6	0	—		—		—		6	0
Milton Keynes Dons	2006–07	League Two	41	5	2	0	2	0	2 (Note: Appearances in Football League play-offs)	0	47	5
Milton Keynes Dons	2007–08	League Two	45	11	0	0	2	0	3 (Note: Appearances in Football League Trophy)	0	50	11
Milton Keynes Dons	Total		86	16	2	0	4	0	5	0	97	16
Leicester City	2008–09	League One	44	10	3	1	1	0	3	0	51	11
Leicester City	2009–10	Championship	33	3	1	0	1	0	2	0	37	3
Leicester City	2010–11	Championship	35	3	2	1	2	1	—		39	5
Leicester City	2011–12	Championship	36	4	5	0	3	2	—		44	6
Leicester City	2012–13	Championship	42	3	3	0	1	1	2	0	48	4
Leicester City	2013–14	Championship	40	7	1	0	5	3	—		46	10
Leicester City	Total		230	30	15	2	13	7	7	0	265	39
Watford	2014–15	Championship	14	1	0	0	2	2	—		16	3
Watford	2015–16	Premier League	0	0	0	0	0	0	—		0	0
Watford	Total		14	1	0	0	2	2	0	0	16	3
Birmingham City (loan)	2014–15	Championship	18	1	1	0	—		—		19	1
Burnley	2015–16	Championship	3	0	—		—		—		3	0
Burton Albion	2016–17	Championship	42	7	1	0	1	0	—		44	7
Burton Albion	2017–18	Championship	38	7	1	0	1	1	—		40	8
Burton Albion	Total		80	14	2	0	2	1	0	0	84	15
Bolton Wanderers	2018–19	Championship	7	0	0	0	—		—		7	0
Burton Albion	2019–20	League One	5	0	1	0	2	0	1	0	9	0
Career total			498	65	23	2	25	10	13	0	559	77

== Honours ==
West Bromwich Albion

- Football League First Division runner-up: 2003–04

Milton Keynes Dons

- Football League Two: 2007–08
- Football League Trophy: 2007–08

Leicester City

- Football League Championship: 2013–14
- Football League One: 2008–09

Individual

- Football League Two Player of the Month: October 2007
- PFA Team of the Year: 2007–08 League Two
