= Scott Dobie =

Scottish footballer

Personal information
- Full name: Robert Scott Dobie
- Date of birth: 10 October 1978 (age 48)
- Place of birth: Workington, England
- Height: 6 ft 1 in (1.85 m)
- Position: Striker

Youth career
- 1995–1996: Carlisle United

Senior career*
Years	Team	Apps	(Gls)
1996–2001	Carlisle United	136	(26)
1998	→ Clydebank (loan)	6	(0)
2001–2004	West Bromwich Albion	110	(22)
2004–2005	Millwall	16	(3)
2005–2008	Nottingham Forest	41	(3)
2008–2010	Carlisle United	84	(12)
2010–2011	St Johnstone	4	(0)
2011	→ Bradford City (loan)	13	(0)
2012	York City	0	(0)
Total		410	(66)

International career
2002	Scotland	6	(1)
- * Club domestic league appearances and goals

Robert Scott Dobie (born 10 October 1978) is a Scottish former footballer who played as a striker.

Although born in England, Dobie played six times for Scotland at full international level in 2002. During a 16-year career he played for Carlisle United, Clydebank, West Bromwich Albion, Millwall, Nottingham Forest, St Johnstone, Bradford City and York City.

== Club career ==
=== Carlisle United ===
Born in Workington, Cumbria, Dobie joined Carlisle United as an apprentice in June 1995, turning professional on 10 May 1997. While at Carlisle, it was Dobie's goalbound header that was parried into the path of Carlisle goalkeeper Jimmy Glass, who scored with the last kick of the final game of the 1998–99 season, preserving Carlisle's Football League status and relegating Scarborough. During 2000–01, Dobie attracted interest from other clubs, with Carlisle manager Ian Atkins claiming that the player could be worth as much as £2 million in the transfer market.

=== West Bromwich Albion ===
Dobie was transferred to West Bromwich Albion on 6 July 2001 for an initial £150,000 fee, with another £50,000 being paid once he reached 25 appearances for his new club. He made his Albion début against Walsall on 11 August 2001. His first goal for the club came on 22 August 2001 in a League Cup tie at Cambridge United, when he lobbed the opposition goalkeeper from 30 yards out. He enjoyed an impressive September, scoring his first league goal for Albion in a 4–0 win over Manchester City, and thus commencing a scoring streak of eight goals in seven games. However he struggled to find the net after that, not scoring again until February. Nonetheless, he finished the season as the club's top scorer with 11 league goals, 13 in total. His performances helped Albion get promoted to the Premier League in 2001–02. Two of his goals came on 16 March 2002 in a 3–0 win at Sheffield United; the game was dubbed the "Battle of Bramall Lane" as it was the only game in English professional football to be abandoned due to a team having insufficient players left on the pitch.

In the summer he handed in a transfer request, reportedly because he wanted a wage increase after breaking into the Scotland national side. Albion refused to sell the player however, and eventually Dobie was rewarded with an improved four-year contract. Dobie was Albion's first Premier League substitute when he replaced Danny Dichio in the opening game against Manchester United at Old Trafford. He scored five times in Albion's first Premiership season and his strike against Tottenham Hotspur on 8 December 2002 was named 'Goal of the Week' by the BBC Sport website, but this wasn't enough to save the club from relegation. Dobie again won promotion with West Brom in 2003–04, helping the club bounce back to the top-flight at the first attempt. He scored five league goals including three in as many matches in consecutive wins against Stoke, Millwall and Gillingham.

Albion returned to the Premier League for the 2004–05 season, and Dobie scored what turned out to be his last goal for the club in a 2-1 defeat to Everton at Goodison Park on 28 August 2004.

=== Millwall ===
With the likes of Kanu and Robert Earnshaw ahead of him in the West Brom pecking order, Dobie struggled to gain first team action at the start of 2004–05, and on 8 November 2004 moved to Millwall in a deal worth "up to" £750,000. Owing to a sell-on clause, his former club Carlisle received at least £37,500 from the deal.

=== Nottingham Forest ===
On 25 February 2005 he joined Nottingham Forest in a £525,000 move from Millwall, signing a three-and-a-half-year deal. His Forest career got off to a slow start, as he scored only one goal in 12 appearances. He then started to find his form, but a series of injuries, including a hip injury that required ground-breaking surgery in America, checked his progress, meaning he scored just two goals in the 2005–06 season.

At the start of the 2006–07 season new manager Colin Calderwood expressed his faith in Dobie and said his career was safe at Forest. But injury again slowed his progress, after suffering a thigh injury on his comeback game, forcing him down the pecking order behind Grant Holt, Junior Agogo and Nathan Tyson. Most of Dobie's appearances in 2006–07 were from the substitutes bench. His only goal that season came in the 2006–07 League One play off semi-final against Yeovil. His header from a corner, put Forest 3–1 up in the tie, but they ended up losing 5–4 on aggregate after extra time.

Dobie began the 2007–08 campaign as a lone striker against AFC Bournemouth but was quickly dropped to the bench, and then cut from the matchday squad altogether, although he returned as a substitute in Forest's 2–0 win at Port Vale.

=== Return to Carlisle ===
On 23 January 2008, Dobie returned to Carlisle United, now in League One, where he signed a two-and-a-half-year contract after moving for a nominal fee. He was on the losing side in a play-off semi-final for the second year running when Carlisle were defeated 3–2 on aggregate by Leeds United, whose team included Dobie's half-cousin Paul Huntington. Dobie received the first red card of his career in a 0–0 draw against Leyton Orient in August 2008.

=== St Johnstone ===
Dobie signed for Scottish Premier League club St Johnstone on a one-year contract in May 2010. Dobie had previously played alongside Saints manager Derek McInnes at West Brom. He played just four games for the Scottish outfit. Dobie signed for League Two side Bradford City in February 2011 on a loan deal until the end of the season.

=== York City ===
After more than a year without a club, Dobie signed for newly promoted League Two club York City on a three-month contract on 30 August 2012. However, he was released a month later on 28 September 2012 after failing to break into the team.

== International career ==
Dobie represented Scotland at international level. He made his debut in a 4–1 defeat away to South Korea on 16 May 2002, in which he scored Scotland's only goal. He was capped six times by Scotland, all of these coming during 2002.

== After football ==
After retiring from football, Dobie became a police officer. He is now an Authorised Firearms Officer and National Firearms Instructor, and has provided armed protection at Merry Hill Shopping Centre in Dudley.

== Career statistics ==
=== Club ===
As of match played 23 April 2011.

Club	Season	League			National Cup		League Cup		Other		Total	
Club	Season	Division	Apps	Goals	Apps	Goals	Apps	Goals	Apps	Goals	Apps	Goals
Carlisle United	1996–97	Third Division	2	1	0	0	0	0	0	0	2	1
Carlisle United	1997–98	Second Division	23	0	1	0	4	0	2 (Note: Appearances in Football League Trophy)	0	30	0
Carlisle United	1998–99	Third Division	33	6	0	0	2	0	2	0	37	6
Carlisle United	1999–2000	Third Division	34	7	1	0	0	0	3	0	38	7
Carlisle United	2000–01	Third Division	44	11	3	2	2	0	0	0	49	13
Carlisle United	Total		136	26	5	2	8	0	7	0	156	28
Clydebank (loan)	1998–99	Scottish First Division	6	0	0	0	0	0	—		6	0
West Bromwich Albion	2001–02	First Division	43	11	4	0	3	2	—		50	13
West Bromwich Albion	2002–03	FA Premier League	31	5	2	0	1	0	—		34	5
West Bromwich Albion	2003–04	First Division	31	5	1	0	5	2	—		37	7
West Bromwich Albion	2004–05	FA Premier League	5	1	0	0	1	0	—		6	1
West Bromwich Albion	Total		110	22	7	0	10	4	—		127	26
Millwall	2004–05	Championship	16	3	0	0	0	0	0	0	16	3
Nottingham Forest	2004–05	Championship	12	1	0	0	0	0	—		12	1
Nottingham Forest	2005–06	League One	8	2	0	0	0	0	0	0	8	2
Nottingham Forest	2006–07	League One	19	0	4	0	0	0	3 (Note: One appearance in Football League Trophy, two appearances and one goal in League One play-offs)	1	26	1
Nottingham Forest	2007–08	League One	2	0	0	0	1	0	0	0	3	0
Nottingham Forest	Total		41	3	4	0	1	0	3	1	49	4
Carlisle United	2007–08	League One	15	4	0	0	0	0	2 (Note: Appearances in League One play-offs)	0	17	4
Carlisle United	2008–09	League One	30	3	2	0	1	0	0	0	33	3
Carlisle United	2009–10	League One	39	5	4	0	3	2	5	3	51	10
Carlisle United	Total		84	12	6	0	4	2	7	3	101	17
St Johnstone	2010–11	Scottish Premier League	4	0	0	0	1	1	—		5	1
Bradford City (loan)	2010–11	League Two	13	0	0	0	0	0	0	0	13	0
York City	2012–13	League Two	0	0	0	0	0	0	0	0	0	0
Career totals			410	66	22	2	24	7	17	4	473	79

=== International ===
National team	Year	Apps	Goals
Scotland	2002	6	1
Total		6	1

==== International goals ====
Scores and results list Scotland's goal tally first.

#	Date	Venue	Opponent	Score	Result	Competition
1	16 May 2002	Asiad Main Stadium, Busan	South Korea	1–3	1–4	Friendly

== Honours ==
Carlisle United

- Football League Trophy runner-up: 2009–10

== See also ==
- List of Scotland international footballers born outside Scotland
