= Joost Volmer =

Dutch footballer

Personal information
- Date of birth: 7 March 1974 (age 52)
- Place of birth: Enschede, Netherlands
- Height: 1.90 m (6 ft 3 in)
- Position: Defender

Youth career
- 1979–1990: HSC '21
- 1990–1993: Twente

Senior career*
Years	Team	Apps	(Gls)
1993–1996	Twente	13	(0)
1996	Helmond Sport	11	(1)
1996–1997	VVV	30	(5)
1997–1999	MVV	64	(3)
1999–2002	Fortuna Sittard	86	(9)
2002–2003	AZ	4	(0)
2003–2004	West Bromwich Albion	15	(0)
2004–2005	Den Bosch	13	(1)
2005–2009	De Graafschap	111	(3)
Total		347	(23)
- * Club domestic league appearances and goals

Joost Gerardus Bernard Volmer (born 7 March 1974), is a retired Dutch footballer. Volmer played for various club teams in the Netherlands, and played once abroad, for West Bromwich Albion. He retired from professional football in November 2009, then playing for De Graafschap, after stating that he could not give a 100% anymore.
