= Gary Megson =

English football player & manager (born 1959)

Personal information
- Full name: Gary John Megson
- Date of birth: 2 May 1959 (age 67)
- Place of birth: Manchester, England
- Height: 5 ft 10 in (1.78 m)
- Position: Midfielder

Senior career*
| Years | Team | Apps | (Gls) |
| 1977–1979 | Plymouth Argyle | 78 | (10) |
| 1979–1981 | Everton | 22 | (2) |
| 1981–1984 | Sheffield Wednesday | 123 | (13) |
| 1984 | Nottingham Forest | 0 | (0) |
| 1984–1985 | Newcastle United | 24 | (1) |
| 1985–1989 | Sheffield Wednesday | 110 | (12) |
| 1989–1992 | Manchester City | 82 | (2) |
| 1992–1995 | Norwich City | 46 | (1) |
| 1995 | Lincoln City | 2 | (0) |
| 1995 | Shrewsbury Town | 2 | (0) |
| Total | | 489 | (41) |

Managerial career
- 1995–1996: Norwich City
- 1996–1997: Blackpool
- 1997–1999: Stockport County
- 1999: Stoke City
- 2000–2004: West Bromwich Albion
- 2005–2006: Nottingham Forest
- 2007: Leicester City
- 2007–2009: Bolton Wanderers
- 2011–2012: Sheffield Wednesday
- 2017: West Bromwich Albion (caretaker)
- * Club domestic league appearances and goals

Gary John Megson (born 2 May 1959) is an English former football player and manager.

He has previously managed Norwich City, Blackpool, Stockport County, Stoke City, West Bromwich Albion, Nottingham Forest, Leicester City, Bolton Wanderers and Sheffield Wednesday. He guided West Brom to promotion in 2001–02 and 2003–04, both times from the First Division to the Premier League.

He is the son of Don Megson and the brother of Neil Megson, both former players.

== Playing career ==
As a player, Megson was a tough-tackling defensive midfielder who played for nine different clubs. He began his career at Plymouth Argyle, where he impressed enough for Everton to sign him for a £250,000 transfer fee. Megson struggled to establish himself in the Everton line-up, and after two years at Goodison, he moved to Sheffield Wednesday, where his father had once played, for a fee of £130,000.

Megson immediately gained a place in Wednesday's starting lineup, and was a member of the team that gained promotion to the top flight in 1983–84, ending a 14-year exile from the elite. In his three years at Hillsborough, he missed only three league games. In the summer of 1984, he was signed by Nottingham Forest, only for Brian Clough to decide "he couldn't trap a bag of cement". Megson spent five months at the City Ground, without making a single first-team appearance before being sold to Newcastle United.

Megson played regularly for the Magpies for the remainder of the 1984–85 season, but lost his place in the line-up the following season, and moved back to Sheffield Wednesday. In his second spell with the Owls, Megson again established himself as an important member of the squad, and was rarely out of the starting eleven. In January 1989, he moved to Manchester City, where he spent three and a half seasons, and helped City finish fifth in his final two seasons there, having helped them win promotion in his first season.

He then moved to Norwich City on a free transfer in the summer of 1992, and spent three seasons at Carrow Road. He was an important member of the Norwich side that finished third in the inaugural season of the Premier League and played in the UEFA Cup for the first time as a result. When manager Mike Walker moved to Everton in January 1994, he was also assistant to the new Norwich manager John Deehan.

When Deehan resigned in April 1995, Megson briefly took charge as caretaker manager, but failed to save City from the drop, losing four and drawing one of his five games in charge. In the summer, he also left Norwich and finished his playing career with short spells at lower division sides Lincoln City and Shrewsbury Town. In December 1995, he returned to Norwich when he was re-appointed manager following Martin O'Neill's sudden departure to Leicester City. He remained as manager at Carrow Road until the end of the season, when Mike Walker was appointed for the second time.

== Managerial career ==
=== Norwich City ===
While still playing at Norwich City, Megson became assistant to manager John Deehan. When Deehan resigned as manager of Norwich on 9 April 1995, with Norwich heading for relegation after a terrible loss of form since Christmas, Megson stepped up to the manager's seat for the remainder of the season, and had five games remaining to secure survival. However, Norwich collected just one point from their remaining games and were relegated. Martin O'Neill was appointed manager that summer, with Megson leaving the club to play for Lincoln City and then Shrewsbury, before joining Bradford City late in 1995 as assistant manager to Chris Kamara. However, by Christmas that year, he was back at Norwich as manager following the departure of Martin O'Neill to Leicester City. Norwich finished 15th in Division One that season and Megson then left the club as Mike Walker returned as manager.

=== Blackpool ===
In 1996, Megson became manager at Blackpool, where he recorded 21 wins in 52 matches – enough to stay clear of relegation to Division Three, but not quite enough for a playoff place and the chance of promotion to the Division One. At Bloomfield Road, he was assisted by the former Manchester United midfielder Mike Phelan, but the partnership failed to bring a Division Two playoff place to the Seasiders, and Megson left at the end of the season.

=== Stockport County ===
Megson moved to Stockport County in July 1997, shortly after Dave Jones' departure for Premier League Southampton. County had been runners-up in Division Two the season before, therefore started the new season in Division One. In Megson's first season they performed admirably and they came just two places short of the Division One playoffs, with some excellent performances, including a 3–1 home win versus Manchester City. The following season was more disappointing and County finished in 16th place. Soon after he left Stockport by mutual consent.

=== Stoke City ===
Megson was not unemployed for long, taking the manager's job at Stoke City in the summer of 1999 after the club missed out on Tony Pulis who instead joined Bristol City. Megson arrived at the club at a time when there was a great deal of pressure on the current board to sell the club to new owners. After a slow start to the 1999–2000 season results gradually improved and the team went on a ten match unbeaten run to haul them into the play-offs. However unfortunately for Megson by November the long-awaited takeover bid was accepted in the form of a group of Icelandic businessmen headed by Gunnar Gíslason. They appointed their own man, former Iceland national team manager Gudjon Thordarson.

=== West Bromwich Albion ===
Megson took over as manager of First Division West Bromwich Albion in March 2000, just days before the transfer deadline at the end of the 1999–2000 season. It was 14 years since Albion had been in the top flight of English football, and in that time they had spent their first ever spell (two seasons) in the third tier. Indeed, when Megson was appointed they were in real danger of a second relegation to that level. But he moved quickly to strengthen the team by bringing in several new players. In his first month in charge, Megson received a 28-day touchline ban following his comments to referee Graham Poll after Albion's 2–0 defeat to Portsmouth. Megson was unhappy about a penalty that Poll had awarded to Portsmouth; some years later, Poll conceded that it was "one of the worst penalties I've ever given". Albion nevertheless ensured their safety by winning their final game of the season.

The following season Megson took the club into the playoffs, winning the Division One Manager of the Month award for November 2000 along the way. Albion lost to Bolton Wanderers at the semi-final stage, but the following year the club won promotion to the Premier League for the first time, overcoming the eleven-point lead of their fierce local rivals Wolverhampton Wanderers in the closing weeks of the campaign. This achievement earned Megson the Nationwide Division One Manager of the Year award, as well as the medieval title Lord of the Manor of West Bromwich. However, the club was barely prepared for the financial challenges of life in the top flight and a bitter quarrel soon developed between Megson and the club's chairman Paul Thompson over what Megson perceived as the latter's interference in footballing matters. An undignified public showdown resulted in Thompson resigning from the board in order to forestall Megson's departure. The board elected Jeremy Peace as Thompson's successor, and in July 2002 Megson signed a new three-year contract with Albion. However, in 2002–03 the club were relegated after just a single season in the Premier League.

Megson mounted a successful promotion campaign the following season, and a return to the Premier League – but by the summer of 2004, the relationship between Megson and Peace had become strained. By September, after a poor start to the season, Megson's job appeared to be under threat. The following month Megson, whose contract was due to end in June 2005, announced that he would not sign a new deal if the club offered one. The board chose to interpret this as a resignation, and on 26 October Megson was dismissed. A settlement for the remainder of his contract was reached in November 2004.

=== Nottingham Forest ===
Within a week of being sacked at West Bromwich Albion, Gary Megson was linked with the manager's job at Albion's local rivals Wolverhampton Wanderers, which became vacant after Dave Jones was sacked – but that job went to Glenn Hoddle instead. On 10 January 2005, Megson was appointed to succeed Joe Kinnear as manager of struggling Nottingham Forest, but was unable to save them from slipping into the third tier of English football for the first time in more than half a century. Promotion back to the Championship was to be his priority for 2005–06, but Forest struggled, especially away from home, for most of the season. In terms of points they were nearer to the relegation zone than the playoff zone when he resigned in February 2006 after being put under a lot of pressure by the Forest fans. He claimed that his resignation had cost him £500,000.

In June 2007 Megson was appointed as a coach at Stoke City by manager Tony Pulis. He retained this role until his appointment as manager of Leicester City.

=== Leicester City ===
On 13 September 2007, Leicester City chairman Milan Mandarić announced Gary Megson as the new manager of the club, citing Megson's "wealth of experience" as a deciding factor in the appointment. Leicester achieved their first League win under Megson on 6 October 2007 with a 2–0 win over Sheffield Wednesday at Hillsborough with goals from Gareth McAuley and an own goal by Akpo Sodje.

A month into Megson's tenure at Leicester, Mandarić rejected an approach from Bolton Wanderers for the manager's services. On 23 October however, Bolton announced that Megson was their first choice to become their new manager, and made a second approach for him. The club said they were also willing to compensate Leicester should Megson leave the Walkers Stadium. This second approach was also rejected by Milan Mandarić, but Megson was eventually given permission to speak to Bolton and he left Leicester on 24 October 2007, just 41 days and nine EFL Championship games after his appointment.

=== Bolton Wanderers ===
Megson took over as manager of Bolton Wanderers on 25 October 2007 in a two-and-a-half-year deal. He accepted that he was not the number one choice for the job, after Bolton had already had approaches for Steve Bruce and Chris Coleman rejected, and Graeme Souness had also ruled himself out. Bolton had made a poor start to the 2007–08 season under Sammy Lee, and when Megson took over they were bottom of the Premier League table with only 5 points from 10 games. Megson's first game in charge was against Aston Villa on 28 October, and finished 1–1. He recorded his first win on 24 November when Bolton beat Manchester United, the champions and League leaders, 1–0; this was their first home victory over United for 30 years.

By the New Year Bolton were lying 16th in the Premier League table, but only two points ahead of Fulham who were 19th. In January 2008 they sold Nicolas Anelka to Chelsea for £15 million, and brought in no comparable replacement. In February 2008 however they beat Atlético Madrid (who at the time were lying fourth in La Liga) 1–0 on aggregate, winning 1–0 at home and drawing 0–0 away, to reach the last 16 of the UEFA Cup for the first time in the club's history before proceeding to play the reserve team in Lisbon in the Last 16 with the tie tied at 1–1, Bolton lost the away leg 1–0. Megson picked a reserve side so that the first team were rested for Sunday's relegation battle against Wigan Athletic. They proceeded to lose 1–0 to a ten-man Wigan side. Their League form remained poor, and a 4–0 defeat at Aston Villa on 5 April left them in 18th place, two points adrift of safety. But they proceeded to take 11 points from their last five games (including a 1–1 draw at Chelsea on the final day of the season) to secure survival in the Premier League – the first time Megson had achieved this as a manager.

Megson won the Premier League Manager of the Month award for November 2008. Heading into the 2008–09 season, he brought in players such as Johan Elmander for a club record £8.2m, Fabrice Muamba from Birmingham City for £5m, Mustapha Riga from Levante, Danny Shittu for £2m and Ebi Smolarek on a season-long loan from Racing Santander with a view to a permanent deal. Bolton started the season unremarkably and by October Bolton were looking set for another relegation scrap. This caused increasing pressure on Megson but he was given time by Chairman Phil Gartside and managed to improve results, leading Bolton to a high of eighth in the league. On 1 March 2009, it was announced that Megson had agreed a new rolling contract with Bolton. He celebrated his new contract with a 1–0 victory over Newcastle United. Bolton finished 13th in the 2008–09 season.

During the summer of 2009 Megson added to the Trotters' squad with the additions of Portsmouth midfielder Sean Davis on a free transfer, Hull City's Welsh right-back Sam Ricketts, Aston Villa's England international defender Zat Knight for £4m, veteran left-back Paul Robinson on loan from West Brom and the South Korean international Lee Chung-Yong. Just before the transfer window closed he added the Croatian international Ivan Klasnić from FC Nantes on a season long loan. In the 2009 season, under Megson's tenure, he started the season in an inauspicious manner with defeats to Hull City and Sunderland before seeing excellent form in the next seven games. These games saw three wins, two draws and narrow defeats to Manchester United and Liverpool. After 25 October, Bolton lost five out of the next six games. The first three were losses by four goals and these were followed by a home defeat to Blackburn, a draw against Fulham and an away defeat at Wolverhampton Wanderers. In a period which lasted almost fifty days without a win Bolton played Manchester City and were scheduled games against other relegation candidates including West Ham United, Wigan Athletic, Burnley and Hull City. In the four games that were played Bolton were leading them all but ended with only one win and three draws, leaving the club 18th out of 20 and with 18 points from 18 games.

On 30 December 2009, Bolton announced that Megson had been relieved of his duties as manager with immediate effect. Bolton Wanderers official club statement said; "The decision has been taken in the light of the position the club finds itself in the Barclays Premier League at the halfway point of the season." It was later confirmed that as the club and their former manager could not agree a compensation deal Megson would be paid out the remainder of his rolling contract on a weekly basis, effectively putting him on a year's garden leave. Over two years after being dismissed by Bolton, Megson complained that he had never won the fans over and hit out at the club's supporters, claiming that they did not like him and he did not like them.

=== Sheffield Wednesday ===
On 4 February 2011, Megson was appointed manager of his former club, Sheffield Wednesday, replacing Alan Irvine who had been relieved of his post the previous day. On 29 February 2012, with the club third in League One, he was sacked. At the time of his sacking he had the third best win percentage of any manager in Sheffield Wednesday's history. His last result before being sacked was a 1–0 victory over Sheffield United in the Steel City derby.

=== Return to West Bromwich Albion ===
Megson returned to West Bromwich Albion as an Assistant Head Coach to Tony Pulis in July 2017.

On 20 November 2017, he was named as the caretaker head coach of West Bromwich Albion "until further notice" after Tony Pulis was sacked. When Alan Pardew was appointed manager of the club, Megson departed.

== Coaching style ==
Darren Huckerby criticised Megson's coaching style, when explaining why he chose to sign for Norwich City, instead of Megson's West Bromwich Albion. "I told him I didn't like the way he coached, I didn't like the way he shouted at his players and didn't like the way he treated seasoned professionals like 15-year-olds. I was just being honest with him. I said: 'I've seen you on the sidelines and you look like a crazed animal'". According to Huckerby, Megson's response was that "He told me that was how he had to work with his players".

== Career statistics ==
Appearances and goals by club, season and competition
| Club | Season | League | | | FA Cup | | League Cup | | Other (Note: include Anglo-Scottish Cup and Full Members Cup.) | | Total | |
| Club | Season | Division | Apps | Goals | Apps | Goals | Apps | Goals | Apps | Goals | Apps | Goals |
|---|---|---|---|---|---|---|---|---|---|---|---|---|
| Plymouth Argyle | 1977–78 | Third Division | 24 | 2 | 4 | 0 | 0 | 0 | 0 | 0 | 28 | 2 |
| Plymouth Argyle | 1978–79 | Third Division | 42 | 8 | 1 | 0 | 4 | 0 | 0 | 0 | 47 | 8 |
| Plymouth Argyle | 1979–80 | Third Division | 12 | 0 | 0 | 0 | 5 | 0 | 3 | 0 | 20 | 0 |
| Plymouth Argyle | Total | | 78 | 10 | 5 | 0 | 9 | 0 | 3 | 0 | 95 | 10 |
| Everton | 1979–80 | First Division | 12 | 1 | 3 | 1 | 0 | 0 | 0 | 0 | 15 | 2 |
| Everton | 1980–81 | First Division | 10 | 1 | 0 | 0 | 0 | 0 | 0 | 0 | 10 | 1 |
| Everton | Total | | 22 | 2 | 3 | 1 | 0 | 0 | 0 | 0 | 25 | 3 |
| Sheffield Wednesday | 1981–82 | Second Division | 40 | 5 | 1 | 0 | 2 | 0 | 0 | 0 | 43 | 5 |
| Sheffield Wednesday | 1982–83 | Second Division | 41 | 4 | 7 | 5 | 5 | 1 | 0 | 0 | 53 | 10 |
| Sheffield Wednesday | 1983–84 | Second Division | 42 | 4 | 4 | 0 | 6 | 1 | 0 | 0 | 52 | 5 |
| Sheffield Wednesday | Total | | 123 | 13 | 12 | 5 | 13 | 2 | 0 | 0 | 148 | 20 |
| Newcastle United | 1984–85 | First Division | 20 | 1 | 2 | 1 | 0 | 0 | 0 | 0 | 22 | 2 |
| Newcastle United | 1985–86 | First Division | 4 | 0 | 0 | 0 | 2 | 0 | 0 | 0 | 6 | 0 |
| Newcastle United | Total | | 24 | 1 | 2 | 1 | 2 | 0 | 0 | 0 | 28 | 2 |
| Sheffield Wednesday | 1985–86 | First Division | 20 | 3 | 5 | 0 | 0 | 0 | 0 | 0 | 25 | 3 |
| Sheffield Wednesday | 1986–87 | First Division | 35 | 6 | 6 | 1 | 3 | 0 | 1 | 0 | 45 | 7 |
| Sheffield Wednesday | 1987–88 | First Division | 37 | 2 | 4 | 0 | 4 | 0 | 2 | 0 | 47 | 2 |
| Sheffield Wednesday | 1988–89 | First Division | 18 | 1 | 0 | 0 | 2 | 0 | 0 | 0 | 20 | 1 |
| Sheffield Wednesday | Total | | 110 | 12 | 15 | 1 | 9 | 0 | 3 | 0 | 137 | 13 |
| Manchester City | 1988–89 | Second Division | 22 | 1 | 1 | 0 | 0 | 0 | 0 | 0 | 23 | 1 |
| Manchester City | 1989–90 | First Division | 19 | 0 | 3 | 0 | 0 | 0 | 0 | 0 | 22 | 0 |
| Manchester City | 1990–91 | First Division | 19 | 1 | 3 | 0 | 2 | 0 | 2 | 0 | 26 | 1 |
| Manchester City | 1991–92 | First Division | 22 | 0 | 1 | 0 | 3 | 0 | 0 | 0 | 26 | 0 |
| Manchester City | Total | | 82 | 2 | 8 | 0 | 5 | 0 | 2 | 0 | 97 | 2 |
| Norwich City | 1992–93 | Premier League | 23 | 1 | 2 | 0 | 0 | 0 | 0 | 0 | 25 | 1 |
| Norwich City | 1993–94 | Premier League | 22 | 0 | 2 | 0 | 0 | 0 | 0 | 0 | 24 | 0 |
| Norwich City | 1994–95 | Premier League | 1 | 0 | 0 | 0 | 0 | 0 | 0 | 0 | 1 | 0 |
| Norwich City | Total | | 46 | 1 | 4 | 0 | 0 | 0 | 0 | 0 | 50 | 1 |
| Lincoln City | 1995–96 | Third Division | 2 | 0 | 0 | 0 | 2 | 0 | 0 | 0 | 4 | 0 |
| Shrewsbury Town | 1995–96 | Second Division | 2 | 0 | 0 | 0 | 0 | 0 | 0 | 0 | 2 | 0 |
| Career total | | | 489 | 41 | 49 | 8 | 40 | 2 | 8 | 0 | 586 | 51 |

== Managerial statistics ==
| Team | From | To | Record | | | | |
| Team | From | To | G | W | D | L | Win % |
|---|---|---|---|---|---|---|---|
| Norwich City | 21 December 1995 | 31 July 1996 | 27 | 5 | 9 | 13 | 18.52 |
| Blackpool | 5 July 1996 | 1 July 1997 | 52 | 21 | 15 | 16 | 40.38 |
| Stockport County | 1 July 1997 | 25 June 1999 | 102 | 35 | 27 | 40 | 34.31 |
| Stoke City | 14 July 1999 | 15 November 1999 | 22 | 9 | 7 | 6 | 40.91 |
| West Bromwich Albion | 9 March 2000 | 26 October 2004 | 221 | 94 | 50 | 77 | 42.53 |
| Nottingham Forest | 10 January 2005 | 16 February 2006 | 59 | 17 | 18 | 24 | 28.81 |
| Leicester City | 13 September 2007 | 24 October 2007 | 9 | 3 | 4 | 2 | 33.33 |
| Bolton Wanderers | 25 October 2007 | 30 December 2009 | 98 | 27 | 26 | 45 | 27.55 |
| Sheffield Wednesday | 4 February 2011 | 29 February 2012 | 62 | 28 | 12 | 22 | 45.16 |
| West Bromwich Albion (caretaker) | 20 November 2017 | 29 November 2017 | 2 | 0 | 2 | 0 | 0.00 |
| Total | | | 654 | 239 | 170 | 245 | 36.54 |

== Honours ==
=== As a manager ===
West Bromwich Albion

- Football League First Division runner-up: 2001–02, 2003–04

Individual

- Premier League Manager of the Month: November 2008
