= 2007–08 Torquay United F.C. season =

Torquay United
2007–08 season
- Chairman: Alex Rowe
- Manager: Paul Buckle
- Conference National: 3rd
- FA Cup: Second round
- FA Trophy: Runners-up
- Conference League Cup: Fourth round
- Top goalscorer: League: Tim Sills (19); All: Tim Sills (23)
- Highest home attendance: 6,015 v Exeter City, 1 May 2008 (Conference National play-off)
- Lowest home attendance: 1,277 v Bashley, 15 Dec 2007 (FA Trophy)
- Average home league attendance: 3,864
Home colours	Away colours

The 2007–08 season was Torquay United's first season in the Conference National after being relegated from League Two. The season runs from 1 July 2007 to 30 June 2008.

== Overview ==
Having been a Football League team for 80 years, Torquay United were finally relegated at the end of the 2006–07 season. After the most chaotic and disastrous season in Torquay's history, chairman Mike Bateson eventually sold the club to an eight-man consortium with Alex Rowe appointed as the new chairman and former-Gull Colin Lee returning as chief executive. Although Leroy Rosenior had previously been announced as the new manager, the consortium decided to go in a different direction and install ex-Torquay midfielder and current Exeter City assistant manager Paul Buckle as the new boss. With only a handful of players still on the club's books, Buckle had to work fast to build a new team in time for Torquay's first season in the Conference.

Despite a slightly nervous 0–0 draw with Grays Athletic in their first ever Conference match, the Gulls soon established themselves within the division and quickly became the team to beat. Buckle had managed to create a particularly potent strike force with new signings Tim Sills, Chris Zebroski and Lee Phillips combining to score nearly 50 league goals between them and Torquay were never out of the play-off spots all season. United were also enjoying more TV coverage than ever before with Setanta Sports now televising live Conference games and the BBC even coming to Plainmoor to broadcast the 4–1 FA Cup first-round victory over League One side Yeovil Town. Yeovil had themselves previously inflicted a cup 'upset' over Torquay in 1992 when they were a non-League side, so it was sweet revenge for the Gulls now that the two team's fortunes had been reversed.

After eventually finishing 3rd in the Conference, Torquay met their local rivals Exeter City in the play-off semi-final. Despite coming away from St James Park with a 2–1 lead in the first leg and going 1–0 up in the return match at Plainmoor, Exeter managed to score four goals in the final 18 minutes of the match to condemn Torquay to a 5–3 aggregate defeat and another season in the Conference. There was the possibility of a consolation for Torquay just a few days later as they had reached the final of the FA Trophy which entailed a trip to the new Wembley Stadium. However, a 1–0 defeat by Ebbsfleet United resulted in another disappointing day for the Gulls. Maybe the only highlight of the day was a late substitute appearance from Kevin Hill who made his 474th and final appearance for Torquay United, breaking the all-time appearance record which had been set by Dennis Lewis back in 1958.

Although Torquay United were perhaps a club who were fortunate to even still be in existence after the débâcle of the previous season, this was a campaign which had promised to deliver so much but had ultimately ended in disappointment. Having failed to return to the Football League at the first attempt, Torquay would now have to make sure they achieved it at the second time of asking.

== League statistics ==
=== Conference National ===
Pos	Team	Pld	W	D	L	GF	GA	GD	Pts	Qualification or relegation
1	Aldershot Town (C, P)	46	31	8	7	82	48	+34	101	Promoted to League Two
2	Cambridge United	46	25	11	10	68	41	+27	86	Qualified for play-offs
3	Torquay United	46	26	8	12	83	57	+26	86	Qualified for play-offs
4	Exeter City (O, P)	46	22	17	7	83	58	+25	83	Qualified for play-offs
5	Burton Albion	46	23	12	11	79	56	+23	81	Qualified for play-offs

Rules for classification: 1) points; 2) goal difference; 3) number of goals scored.
(C) Champion; (O) Play-off winner; (P) Promoted

==== Results summary ====
Overall								Home						Away					
Pld	W	D	L	GF	GA	GD	Pts	W	D	L	GF	GA	GD	W	D	L	GF	GA	GD
46	26	8	12	83	57	+26	86	15	3	5	39	21	+18	11	5	7	44	36	+8

Source: Torquay United

==== Results by round ====
Round	1	2	3	4	5	6	7	8	9	10	11	12	13	14	15	16	17	18	19	20	21	22	23	24	25	26	27	28	29	30	31	32	33	34	35	36	37	38	39	40	41	42	43	44	45	46
Ground	H	A	A	H	A	H	H	A	H	A	A	H	H	A	A	H	A	H	A	H	A	A	A	H	H	A	H	H	A	H	H	A	H	A	A	H	A	A	H	H	A	H	A	H	A	H
Result	D	W	W	W	D	W	W	L	W	W	W	W	W	L	D	W	W	L	W	W	W	L	W	W	L	D	W	W	D	W	D	L	L	L	W	W	D	W	L	W	W	W	L	D	L	L
Position	13	2	1	1	1	1	1	3	1	1	1	1	1	1	2	1	1	2	2	2	2	2	2	2	2	3	2	2	2	2	2	2	2	3	4	2	2	2	2	2	2	2	2	2	2	3

Source: Torquay United
A = Away; H = Home; W = Win; D = Draw; L = Loss

== Season diary ==
- 1 August: Darren Mullings joins after his release from Bristol Rovers
- 1 August: Chris Zebroski joins on loan from Millwall
- 12 August: Torquay play their first ever game in the Conference, a 0–0 draw away to Grays Athletic
- 14 August: Ishmael Welsh joins on loan from Yeovil Town
- 20 September: Scott Laird joins on a month's loan from Plymouth Argyle
- 21 September: Defender Mark Ellis joins on loan from Bolton Wanderers
- 11 November: Torquay beat League One Yeovil Town in an FA Cup First Round televised live by the BBC
- 1 December: Torquay lose at home to Brighton & Hove Albion in the FA Cup second round
- 19 December: Mark Ellis extends his loan stay until the end of the season
- 22 December: Torquay exit Conference League Cup in Fourth Round after defeat away to St Albans City
- 3 January: Winger Leslie Thompson joins on loan from Bolton Wanderers as a replacement for Ishmael Welsh who was recalled by Yeovil from his loan spell
- 4 January: Manager Paul Buckle signs a new two-and-a-half-year contract
- 7 January: Goalkeeper Michael Poke joins on loan from Southampton
- 17 January: Goalkeeper Simon Rayner joins Boston United on loan
- 24 January: Loanee Leslie Thompson returns to Bolton Wanderers
- 27 January: Kaid Mohamed joins on loan from Swindon Town
- 27 January: Steve Adams joins from Swindon Town on a free transfer
- 27 January: Roscoe D'Sane joins from Accrington Stanley
- 31 January: Danny Stevens signs new two-and-a-half-year contract
- 31 January: Danny Wring leaves Torquay by mutual consent
- 26 February: Mikkel Andersen joins on loan from Droylsden
- 29 February: Jody Banim joins on loan from Droylsden
- 29 February: Tony Bedeau joins Weymouth on loan
- 5 May: Torquay exit Conference play-offs at semi-final stage after 5–3 aggregate defeat by Exeter City
- 10 May: Torquay lose in final of FA Trophy to Ebbsfleet United at Wembley Stadium
- 10 May: Kevin Hill breaks club appearance record
- 13 May: Tony Bedeau, Matthew Hockley, Paul Hinshelwood and Darren Mullings released on free transfers
- 16 May: Lee Phillips joins Rushden & Diamonds for an undisclosed fee
- 19 May: Michael Brough joins from Forest Green Rovers
- 20 May: Tyrone Thompson joins from Crawley Town on a two-year contract
- 21 May: Mark Ellis joins from Bolton Wanderers on a two-year contract
- 21 May: Lee Mansell signs new two-year contract
- 28 May: Roscoe D'Sane signs a new one-year contract
- 28 May: Nicky Wroe joins from York City for an undisclosed fee
- 2 June: Matt Green joins from Cardiff City on a two-year contract
- 3 June: Former Torquay player and manager Paul Compton appointed head of Torquay's new youth system
- 11 June: Simon Rayner and Chris Robertson placed on transfer list
- 13 June: Lee Hodges joins from Wycombe Wanderers
- 30 June: Simon Rayner leaves to join Crawley Town

== Match results ==
All friendly matches and first team games in Conference National, FA Cup, FA Trophy and Conference League Cup are listed below. Reserve matches and regional cup competitions are not included.

=== Conference National ===
Win	Draw	Loss

Date	Opponent	Venue	Result (Note: Torquay United's score shown first)	Scorers	Attendance	Position
12 August 2007	Grays Athletic	Home	0–0		4,012	13
15 August 2007	Aldershot Town	Away	3–0	Sills, Stevens, Zebroski	3,139	2
18 August 2007	Northwich Victoria	Away	3–1	Sills, Phillips (2)	1,117	1
25 August 2007	Rushden & Diamonds	Home	3–2	Sills, Phillips, Zebroski	3,107	1
27 August 2007	Forest Green Rovers	Away	2–2	Hargreaves, Robertson	2,382	1
1 September 2007	Stafford Rangers	Home	2–0	Todd, Benyon	2,980	1
4 September 2007	Salisbury City	Home	4–0	Todd, Phillips, Sills (2)	3,215	1
10 September 2007	Burton Albion	Away	1–3	Benyon	2,086	3
14 September 2007	Halifax Town	Home	3–1	Robertson, Sills, Hockley	2,727	1
18 September 2007	Histon Town	Away	5–4	Sills, Mullings, Zebroski (2), Todd	763	1
22 September 2007	Kidderminster Harriers	Away	5–2	Hinshelwood, Sills, Zebroski (2), Phillips	2,027	1
25 September 2007	Weymouth	Home	3–2	Zebroski, Phillips, Hill	3,548	1
29 September 2007	Droylsden	Home	2–1	Sills, Phillips	3,321	1
6 October 2007	Ebbsfleet United	Away	1–2	Ellis	1,386	1
11 October 2007	Oxford United	Away	3–3	Welsh, Zebroski, Sills	4,633	2
14 October 2007	Stevenage Borough	Home	4–2	Zebroski (2), Julian (og), Phillips	3,744	1
21 October 2007	York City	Away	1–0	Todd	2,483	1
3 November 2007	Cambridge United	Home	1–2	Benyon	3,368	2
17 November 2007	Crawley Town	Away	3–2	Mansell, Ellis, Sills	1,848	2
24 November 2007	Woking	Home	2–0	Benyon, Hargreaves	3,275	2
12 December 2007	Farsley Celtic	Away	2–1	Zebroski, Stevens	717	2
26 December 2007	Exeter City	Away	3–4	Todd, Phillips, Nicholson	7,839	2
29 December 2007	Woking	Away	1–0	Sills	2,181	2
1 January 2008	Exeter City	Home	1–0	Sills	6,021	2
7 January 2008	Burton Albion	Home	1–2	Zebroski	2,359	2
19 January 2008	Salisbury City	Away	0–0		2,633	3
28 January 2008	Histon	Home	1–0	Sills	2,482	2
9 February 2008	Kidderminster Harriers	Home	1–0	Ellis	3,012	2
12 February 2008	Weymouth	Away	0–0		1,970	2
16 February 2008	Ebbsfleet United	Home	3–1	Mohamed (2), Zebroski	2,704	2
26 February 2008	Altrincham	Home	1–1	Zebroski	2,310	2
1 March 2008	Grays Athletic	Away	0–2		1,018	2
3 March 2008	Aldershot Town	Home	1–2	Phillips	4,510	2
11 March 2008	Halifax Town	Away	2–3	Phillips (2)	894	3
22 March 2008	Stafford Rangers	Away	2–0	Sills, Dsane	905	4
24 March 2008	Forest Green Rovers	Home	1–0	Dsane	3,071	2
29 March 2008	Altrincham	Away	1–1	Hill	1,163	2
1 April 2008	Droylsden	Away	2–1	Sills, Dsane	476	2
5 April 2008	Farsley Celtic	Home	0–1		2,406	2
8 April 2008	Oxford United	Home	3–2	Zebroski (2), Sills	2,241	2
12 April 2008	Stevenage Borough	Away	3–1	Hargreaves, Zebroski, Sills	2,673	2
15 April 2008	Northwich Victoria	Home	1–0	Zebroski	2,270	2
17 April 2008	Rushden & Diamonds	Away	1–2	Benyon	1,276	2
19 April 2008	York City	Home	0–0		2,165	2
22 April 2008	Cambridge United	Away	0–2		4,100	2
26 April 2008	Crawley Town	Home	1–2	Sills	3,121	3

=== Conference National play-offs ===
Win	Draw	Loss

Round	Date	Opponent	Venue	Result	Scorers	Attendance
Semi-Final(first leg)	1 May 2008	Exeter City	Away	2–1	Sills, Zebroski	8,276
Semi-Final(second leg)	5 May 2008	Exeter City	Home	1–4	Hill	6,015
Exeter City won 5–3 on aggregate

=== FA Cup ===
Win	Draw	Loss

Round	Date	Opponent	Venue	Result	Scorers	Attendance
4th Qualifying Round	27 October 2007	Bath City	Away	2–0	Phillips, Stevens	2,149
1st Round	11 November 2007	Yeovil Town	Home	4–1	Todd (2), Stevens (2)	3,718
2nd Round	1 December 2007	Brighton & Hove Albion	Home	0–2	—	4,010

=== FA Trophy ===
Win	Draw	Loss

Round	Date	Opponent	Venue	Result	Scorers	Attendance
1st Round	15 December 2007	Bashley	Home	1–0	Sills	1,277
2nd Round	12 January 2008	Newport County	Away	2–1	Hargreaves (2)	1,510
3rd Round	4 February 2008	AFC Wimbledon	Away	2–0	D'Sane, Phillips	4,085
4th Round	23 February 2008	Crawley Town	Home	4–1	D'Sane, Mohamed (2), Phillips	2,301
Semi-final (first leg)	7 March 2008	York City	Home	2–0	Sills, Phillips	2,286
Semi-final (second leg)	15 March 2008	York City	Away	0–1 (Note: Torquay United won 2–1 on aggregate)	—	3,625
Final	10 May 2008	Ebbsfleet United	Wembley	0–1	—	40,186

=== Conference League Cup ===
Round	Date	Opponent	Venue	Result	Attendance
4th Round	22 December 2007	St Albans City	Away	0–1	454

== Player statistics ==
As of final game of the season on 10 May 2008

No.	Player	League Apps	League Goals	Cup Apps	Cup Goals	Total Apps	Total Goals	YC	RC
24	(England) Steve Adams	12	0	7	0	19	0	1	0
36	(Denmark) Mikkel Andersen	3	0	0	0	3	0	0	0
12	(England) Jody Banim	8	0	0	0	8	0	1	0
15	(Grenada) Tony Bedeau	23	0	4	0	27	0	4	0
9	(England) Elliot Benyon	22	5	8	0	30	5	1	0
20	(England) Roscoe D'Sane	19	3	6	2	25	5	3	0
25	(England) Mark Ellis	22	3	7	0	29	3	3	0
14	(England) Chris Hargreaves	38	3	14	2	52	5	8	0
11	(England) Kevin Hill	13	2	7	1	20	3	0	0
2	(England) Paul Hinshelwood	7	1	1	0	8	1	1	0
16	(England) Matthew Hockley	29	1	4	0	33	1	5	0
20	(England) Scott Laird	2	0	0	0	2	0	0	0
10	(England) Lee Phillips	41	12	13	5	54	17	6	0
7	(England) Lee Mansell	34	1	14	0	48	1	7	1
23	(Wales) Kaid Mohamed	10	2	4	2	14	4	0	0
17	(England) Darren Mullings	6	1	1	0	7	1	1	1
3	(England) Kevin Nicholson	46	1	16	0	62	1	0	0
27	(England) Michael Poke	4	0	2	0	6	0	0	0
1	(Canada) Simon Rayner	30	0	3	0	33	0	0	0
21	(England) Martin Rice	9	0	11	0	20	0	1	0
5	(Scotland) Chris Robertson	23	2	8	0	31	2	3	0
8	(England) Tim Sills	44	19	15	4	59	23	5	0
19	(England) Danny Stevens	29	2	10	3	39	5	2	0
24	(England) Leslie Thompson	1	0	1	0	2	0	0	0
6	(Wales) Chris Todd	42	5	15	2	57	7	8	0
18	(England) Ishmael Welsh	18	1	4	0	22	4	0	0
4	(England) Steve Woods	21	0	8	0	29	0	5	0
12	(England) Danny Wring	6	0	1	0	7	0	0	0
26	(England) Chris Zebroski	46	18	15	1	61	19	7	0
