= Barry Cogan =

Barry Cogan may refer to:

- Barry Cogan (politician) (born 1936), Irish Irish Fianna Fáil politician, former TD and Senator
- Barry Cogan (footballer) (born 1984), Irish footballer
