= Darren Moore =

English footballer and manager (born 1974)

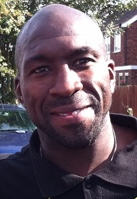
- Moore while at Burton Albion in 2011

Personal information
- Full name: Darren Mark Moore
- Date of birth: 22 April 1974 (age 52)
- Place of birth: Birmingham, England
- Height: 6 ft 2 in (1.88 m)
- Position: Centre-back

Team information
- Current team: England U20 (head coach)

Youth career
- 1990–1992: Torquay United

Senior career*
Years	Team	Apps	(Gls)
1992–1995	Torquay United	103	(8)
1995–1997	Doncaster Rovers	76	(7)
1997–1999	Bradford City	62	(3)
1999–2001	Portsmouth	59	(2)
2001–2006	West Bromwich Albion	104	(6)
2006–2008	Derby County	80	(3)
2008–2010	Barnsley	73	(2)
2010–2012	Burton Albion	38	(0)
2012	Wellington Amateurs	0	(0)
Total		595	(31)

International career
1999–2000	Jamaica	2	(0)

Managerial career
- 2018–2019: West Bromwich Albion
- 2019–2021: Doncaster Rovers
- 2021–2023: Sheffield Wednesday
- 2023–2024: Huddersfield Town
- 2024–2025: Port Vale
- 2026–: England U20
- * Club domestic league appearances and goals

Darren Mark Moore (born 22 April 1974) is a professional football manager and former player who played as a centre-back. He is the coach of the England national U20 team.

Moore was born in Birmingham, though represented Jamaica at international level. He began his club career with Torquay United, playing 124 competitive games between turning professional in 1992 and being sold to Doncaster Rovers in July 1995 for an initial fee of £65,000. He was named Doncaster's Player of the Year for the 1995–96 season before being sold to Bradford City for an initial fee of £195,000 in June 1997. He was promoted out of the First Division in 1998–99 and was named on the PFA Team of the Year, though was then forced out of the club and sold on to Portsmouth for £500,000 in November 1999. He spent two seasons with Pompey before being purchased by West Bromwich Albion for £750,000 in September 2001. He spent five years with West Brom, being named on the PFA Team of the Year during the club's First Division promotion campaigns in 2001–02 and 2003–04. He was sold to Derby County for an initial £300,000 in January 2006 and won a fourth promotion into the Premier League with victory in the 2007 play-off final. He signed with Barnsley in July 2008, where he would remain for two Championship seasons before he joined League Two side Burton Albion in May 2010. He retired in February 2012, scoring 38 goals in 668 league and cup appearances throughout a 20-year professional playing career.

Moore coached the youth teams at West Bromwich Albion and was installed as caretaker manager in April 2018. The club went on to be relegated, though he was named as Premier League Manager of the Month and given the job permanently. He was sacked in March 2019, with the club in the Championship play-off places. He returned to management with Doncaster Rovers in July 2019 and left the club in the League One play-off places in March 2021 after being hired as the new manager of Sheffield Wednesday. He failed to prevent the club from being relegated from the Championship. Though Wednesday were beaten in the 2022 play-off semi-finals, they won the 2023 play-off final after accumulating 96 points in the regular season and overturning a four-goal deficit in the play-off semi-finals. He left the club by mutual consent in June 2023 and took charge at Huddersfield Town in September 2023. He was sacked four months later and appointed Port Vale manager in February 2024. Port Vale were relegated from League One at the end of the 2023–24 season, though secured an immediate promotion out of League Two at the end of the 2024–25 campaign. He departed with the club bottom of League One in December 2025 and was appointed England U20 head coach in September 2026. He has performed extensive charity work for the Professional Footballers' Association, Show Racism the Red Card, and the Free Methodist Church.

== Club career ==
=== Early life and career ===
Darren Mark Moore was born on 22 April 1974 in Birmingham, West Midlands, and attended James Watt Primary School and Holyhead Secondary, both in Handsworth. He grew up supporting Aston Villa. He played for Holly Lane Colts and in 1989 had an unsuccessful trial with Walsall.

=== Torquay United ===
Moore began his football career as a trainee with Torquay United in June 1990, having succeeded on a one-week trial at the age of 16. He made his debut while still a trainee on 24 March 1992, in a 2–1 defeat at home to Birmingham City. Manager Ivan Golac took charge at Dundee United and gave a trial to Moore and midfield teammate Chris Myers. Moore remained with Torquay, however, now managed by former youth-team coach Paul Compton. He turned professional in November 1992. He quickly became the first choice in the centre of defence, alongside Wes Saunders, and was presented with the club's Young Player of the Year award by manager Neil Warnock after Warnock steered the club away from being relegated into non-League football at the end of the 1992–93 campaign. Moore then made 44 appearances for player-manager Don O'Riordan across the 1993–94 season, scoring four goals, including a volleyed-effort in the play-off semi-final first leg win over Preston North End at Plainmoor. However, Preston won the return leg 4–1 to eliminate Torquay from the play-offs. He played 38 games in the 1994–95 season to take his final tally with the club to 124 league and cup appearances, with 11 goals scored. He left to join Third Division rivals Doncaster Rovers in July 1995 for a tribunal-set fee of £65,000 plus future transfer profit add-ons that eventually amounted to an extra £63,500.

=== Doncaster Rovers ===
Moore arrived at Sammy Chung's Doncaster with Torquay teammates Scott Colcombe and Duane Darby. He appeared in the first game of the season, a 1–0 win over Scarborough at Belle Vue on 12 August. His first goal for the club came in a 1–1 draw at Barnet on 4 November. He was named as Doncaster's Player of the Year for the 1995–96 season, winning the popular vote by a landslide margin. However, financially the club was in dire straits, and player-manager Kerry Dixon had said that owner Ken Richardson was picking the team, not him, on the way to a fourth-from-bottom finish in 1996–97. In May 1997, Moore was named as a target by Fulham manager Micky Adams, whilst Barnsley had a joint bid of £300,000 for Moore and Colin Cramb rejected by Doncaster. Moore was sold to Bradford City the following month for an initial fee of £195,000, with a further £110,000 to come on appearances.

=== Bradford City ===
Moore played 18 times during the 1997–98 season as injuries limited his starts. During a 1–1 draw with Portsmouth at Fratton Park on 21 October, Bradford manager Chris Kamara was sent to the stands after confronting the Portsmouth physio for knocking Moore to the ground. Moore went on to feature 51 times throughout the 1998–99 season as City secured the second automatic promotion place in the First Division. He was named in the PFA Team of the Year. However, he refused to sign a new contract and fell out with chairman Geoffrey Richmond as a result. He was transfer-listed in June 1999. He was not given the chance to prove himself in the Premier League and was instead made to train with the reserves. He played just once more for Bradford, in the League Cup against Reading. First Division Wolverhampton Wanderers enquired about taking the defender on loan in September 1999 but had their efforts rebuffed by Bradford.

=== Portsmouth ===
On 15 November 1999, Portsmouth signed Moore for a fee of £500,000. He got off to a difficult start as Portsmouth lost in his first seven games. Manager Alan Ball was soon replaced by Tony Pulis the following January, who said that he "was captain and he was absolutely fantastic for me. I took an instant liking to him". Pulis helped to steer Pompey away from the First Division relegation zone at the end of the 1999–2000 season and said that his success was "partly down to Darren's knowledge of the players and the people he knew around the football club". The 2000–01 season was highly disrupted, however, as Pulis was placed on garden leave by chairman Milan Mandarić, and new manager Steve Claridge dropped Moore to the bench. Claridge was soon replaced by Graham Rix, who dropped Moore from the first-team entirely as Portsmouth struggled to a 20th-place finish at the end of the 2000–01 season. Moore left Fratton Park early in the 2001–02 season, returning to the West Midlands with First Division rivals West Bromwich Albion for a fee of £750,000 on 14 September.

=== West Bromwich Albion ===
Moore made 36 appearances in the 2001–02 campaign as West Brom secured promotion to the Premier League with a second-place finish, with Moore scoring a volley in a final-day win over Crystal Palace at The Hawthorns. They also reached the quarter-finals of the FA Cup, where they lost out to Fulham. Alongside goalkeeper Russell Hoult and left-back Neil Clement, Moore was one of three West Brom players named in the PFA Team of the Year for the First Division as West Brom set a club record 27 clean sheets and conceded just 29 league goals. He made 29 Premier League starts in the 2002–03 season, often partnering Phil Gilchrist at centre-back. However, the club were relegated after finishing in 19th place. The club secured an immediate return to the Premier League, again finishing in second. Moore made 23 appearances in the 2003–04 campaign, he did score in wins against both Sheffield United and Crystal Palace. The 2004–05 season saw Bryan Robson replace Gary Megson as manager, who went on to manage Nottingham Forest and have a transfer bid for Moore that was rejected by West Brom. Moore subsequently complained that he was not offered a new contract by the club now that they were in a higher division, though Robson said "I need to see him more before making any decisions" as Moore played had played only four first-team games for Robson at that point.

Denmark international centre-back Martin Albrechtsen became the club's transfer record signing in June 2004, whilst his compatriot Thomas Gaardsøe went on to be named the club's Player of the Year that season. Moore spent three-and-a-half months out of the first XI as Neil Clement and Darren Purse were preferred ahead of him, though assistant manager Nigel Pearson praised him for his performance once he did make it back into the team. It ultimately proved to be a successful season for the club as Albion became the first club in Premier League history to avoid relegation after being bottom of the table at Christmas.

Moore signed a new two-year contract in April 2005. However, Moore struggled to hold down a regular first-team place during the first half of the 2005–06 season. He was sent off in the match against Wigan Athletic on 15 January, his only dismissal in 116 games for Albion. It proved to be his last appearance during his time at the club. Later that month, he was sold to Derby County for a fee of £300,000, rising to £500,000 depending on appearances.

=== Derby County ===
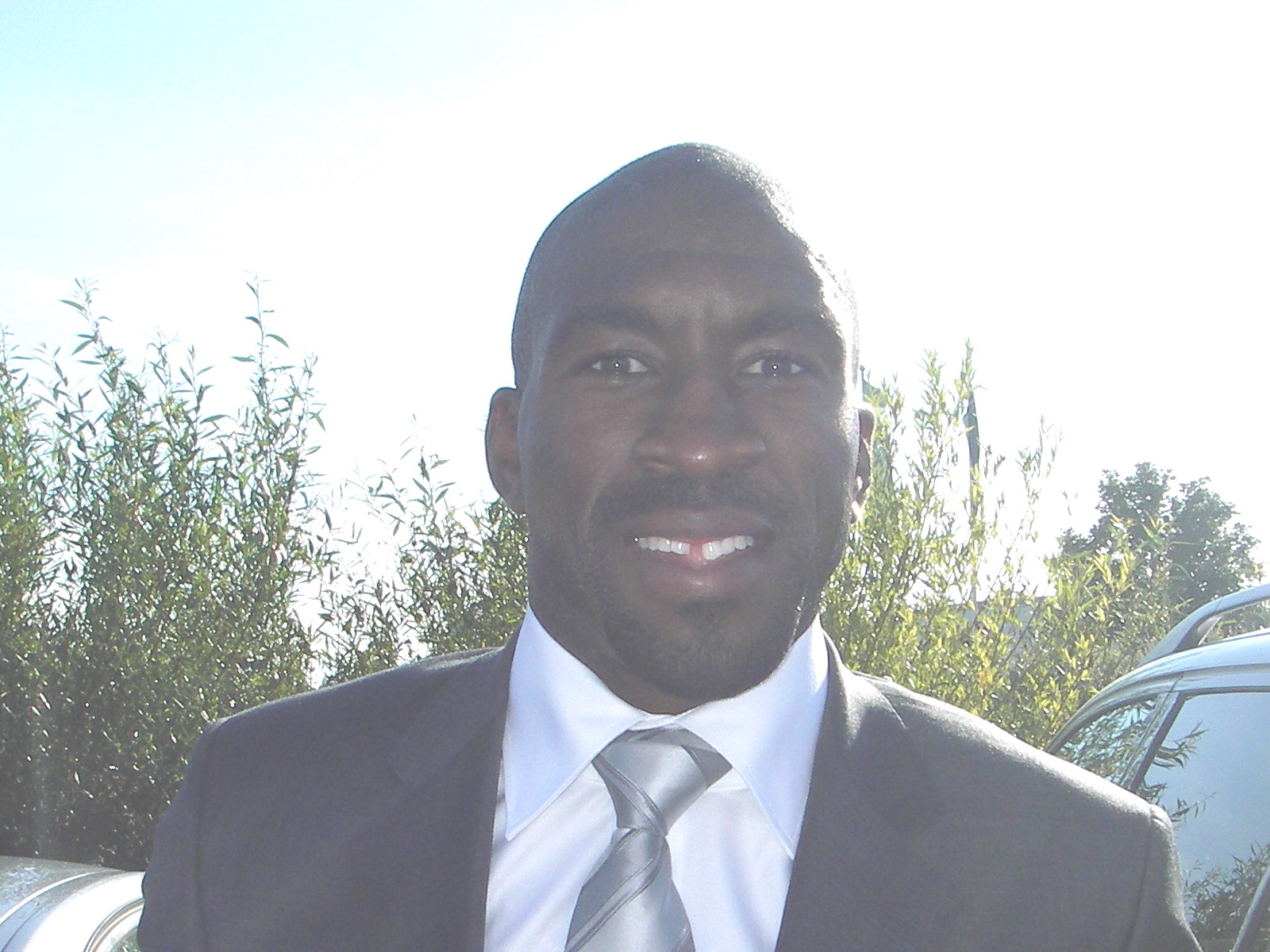
Moore while at Derby County in 2007

Phil Brown was sacked as Derby manager just four days after Moore arrived at the club. County ended the 2005–06 season just above the Championship relegation zone under the stewardship of caretaker manager Terry Westley, with Moore playing 14 games. He proved to be a pivotal figure in the 2006–07 season as Derby finished in third place, and he scored in the play-off semi-final second leg win over Southampton at Pride Park. Derby then clinched promotion back to the Premier League after a five-year absence by beating his former club West Brom 1–0 in the play-off final at Wembley Stadium. This was the fourth time he had been part of a squad which won promotion to the Premier League, following on from his successes at West Brom (twice) and Bradford. His form that year led to him again being named in the PFA Team of the Year.

The 2007–08 season saw Derby finish with a record-low tally of 11 points, with manager Billy Davies being replaced by Paul Jewell – Moore's former manager at Bradford – in November; Moore cited Davies's departure as a key factor in the team's demise. Moore was awarded the club's Player of the Year award. Following Derby's relegation, Jewell allowed Moore to talk to his former club Bradford City, who were managed by his former teammate Stuart McCall. However, Bradford decided not to pursue their interest in Moore, instead opting to sign Graeme Lee.

=== Barnsley ===
Moore signed a one-year deal with Barnsley after joining on a free transfer on 2 July 2008. Manager Simon Davey said they beat off competition from several sides to win his signature. Speaking four months later, Davey said that he was delighted with Moore's form and that he "is the most focused player I have ever worked with". Moore played 76 games at Oakwell across the 2008–09 and 2009–10 seasons, helping the club to finish outside the Championship relegation zone before he was released by new manager Mark Robins.

=== Burton Albion ===
Moore signed for Burton Albion on 7 May 2010, days after his release from Barnsley. He was signed by his former Derby teammate Paul Peschisolido. On 3 August, he was announced as the club's new captain, replacing Darren Stride. He featured 34 times in the 2010–11 campaign as Burton posted a 19th-place finish in League Two. He received the PFA Player In The Community Award in March 2011. Injuries limited him to just five appearances in the first half of the 2011–12 season, and Moore subsequently left the Pirelli Stadium by mutual agreement on 7 February. Two months later, he signed with Wellington Amateurs of the West Midlands (Regional) League Division One as a favour to Wellington manager and lifelong friend Richard Brown. He played one game for Wellington, helping them to reach a cup final.

== International career ==
Moore was called up to the Jamaica national team for two friendly games against Saudi Arabia in July 1999. He went on to win two caps, playing in 1–0 friendly defeats to Canada and Panama. In July 2000, the newly appointed Jamaica technical director of football, Clóvis de Oliveira, decided to axe the five based British-based players, including Moore, from the upcoming 2002 FIFA World Cup qualifiers for "disciplinary reasons". The suspension, given to the players for missing a training session, was quickly lifted following protestations by Fitzroy Simpson.

== Managerial career ==
=== West Bromwich Albion ===
Moore coached the under-18s at West Bromwich Albion and was first elevated to work with the first-team by Tony Pulis, who had previously managed Moore at Portsmouth. On 2 April 2018, Alan Pardew – who had succeeded Pulis as the club's manager, was dismissed from his post after a run of poor results, leaving them bottom of the Premier League and ten points from safety. Moore was then appointed as caretaker manager, taking charge of all current first-team affairs until the end of the 2017–18 season. This made him the first Jamaican to manage in the Premier League. Under his leadership, West Brom went undefeated in April, a run that included a 1–0 win over Manchester United at Old Trafford – handing the league title to United's arch-rivals Manchester City, in part earning Moore the Premier League Manager of the Month honour. However, West Brom were relegated from the Premier League later that day following Southampton's win against Swansea City, ending the club's eight-year tenure in the top-flight. The club picked up eleven points from his six games in caretaker charge.

On 18 May 2018, Moore was appointed as the permanent head coach of West Bromwich Albion after impressing during his caretaker spell with the Baggies. He experienced a "difficult summer" as the club was without a recruitment team and technical director, and only appointed an assistant manager in Graeme Jones two days before the season's opening fixture. He was named as Championship Manager of the Month for September after his side scored 12 goals and collected 13 points from their five league games to go top of the table, with head judge George Burley commending him for playing "great attacking football". Moore led the team to fourth in the Championship with the club still in with a chance of automatic promotion to the Premier League, but this was cut short with his surprise sacking with only ten games remaining of the 2018–19 season. Jay Rodriguez and Dwight Gayle had scored 33 goals between them, though the Albion attack was weakened following the recall of loanee Harvey Barnes, whilst a weak defence and poor home form contributed to the short run of poor results that cost Moore his job. The club appointed first-team coach James Shan to temporarily replace Moore in caretaker charge, who led them to defeat in the play-off semi-finals to local rivals Aston Villa. Moore later said that he felt the club made the wrong decision in sacking him, particularly when they failed to bring in an experienced replacement.

=== Doncaster Rovers ===
Moore was appointed as manager of League One club Doncaster Rovers on 10 July 2019. He started his reign with a six-game undefeated streak in the league before a 1–0 defeat to Blackpool at the Keepmoat Stadium on 17 September. As a result of the COVID-19 pandemic, all football and other sporting competitions were halted from March 2020 onwards. The 2019–20 season was eventually curtailed early, and the final league table was calculated by a points-per-game basis; Doncaster narrowly missed out on play-off qualification, finishing the season in ninth position.

The 2020–21 season began with two wins and one draw in the league, which saw Moore nominated for the League One Manager of the Month award for September. At the time of his departure, Doncaster were pushing for promotion and chairman David Blunt was angered that Moore had left "part way through what has been a season full of promise". Doncaster ended the campaign in 14th-place under the stewardship of interim manager Andy Butler.

=== Sheffield Wednesday ===
On 1 March 2021, Moore left Doncaster with the club in the League One play-off positions to join Sheffield Wednesday, sitting inside the Championship relegation zone. He was forced to sit out two matches the following month after giving a positive COVID-19 test. He returned to the dugout for the defeat against Swansea City, but he suffered a setback a few days later in his recovery, developing pneumonia as a result of COVID-19. He returned to the dugout again for the final game of the 2020–21 season, a must-win tie against Derby County, who were outside of the relegation zone in 21st-place with a three-point lead on Wednesday but an inferior goal difference. The game finished 3–3, which meant that Sheffield Wednesday finished in last place and were relegated back to League One. After the match, owner Dejphon Chansiri confirmed that Moore would remain as manager for the following season.

Wednesday adapted well to the third tier, and Moore was nominated for November's League One Manager of the Month award following 11 points and 11 goals in five unbeaten games. He received another nomination for February too, with Wednesday winning five of their six games - four of them by a two-goal margin - to move into the play-off picture. Moore led his side to the play-offs by earning 16 points from the final 21 available, getting himself his third and final EFL Manager of the Month nomination for the 2021–22 season. He achieved 85 points in his first full season as a manager, though Wednesday fell short in the play-offs, losing 2–1 to Sunderland over two legs.

After failing in the play-offs the previous season, Wednesday kicked off the following season in great form; four wins from five games, with a clean sheet in each, gave Moore a Manager of the Month nomination for August. A further 14 points from seven games in October and six points from two in November earned him back-to-back EFL Manager of the Month nominations for October and November. Another nine points in January from three games with a combined score of 7–0, gave him another nomination. The club went 20 league games without defeat and managed to go top of the league, resulting in yet another nomination for Manager of the Month. On 11 April, he was nominated for EFL League One Manager of the Season, alongside Kieran McKenna and eventual winner Steven Schumacher. A dip in form saw his team finish the 2022–23 season in third place, earning a play-off tie against Peterborough United. Wednesday lost the first leg by a convincing 4–0 scoreline and were booed off the pitch by their fans. In the aftermath of the defeat, Moore received racist abuse.

The second leg was played at a full Hillsborough Stadium, where the Owls won on penalties after the tie was locked at 5–5 following a 4–0 win in 90 minutes and two goals shared in extra-time. After the match, captain Barry Bannan thanked Moore in front of the whole squad, saying: "What he has done is unbelievable, to turn around the mindset of the players. I'm so proud of him how he's handled this week after the racism he's experienced. This one's for him." Moore would then go and lead Sheffield Wednesday to promotion back to the Championship with a 1–0 win against Barnsley at Wembley in the final on 29 May, capping a season in which he presided over three club records: number of points (96), longest unbeaten run (23), and highest number of clean sheets (24), in addition to 12 away wins, as well as the biggest comeback in EFL play-off history. On 19 June 2023, Moore left the club by mutual consent, after he and Chansiri failed to agree on the terms of a potential contract renewal. Chansiri claimed Moore wanted a "minimum of four times" his current salary plus a three-year contract, though Moore responded by saying it was purely a footballing decision as the two men shared vastly different views on what the club's transfer policy should be. The League Managers Association (LMA) indicated that Moore's initial wage demands were in the region of the average second tier salary.

=== Huddersfield Town ===
On 21 September 2023, Moore was appointed as manager of Huddersfield Town, succeeding Neil Warnock. He was sacked on 29 January 2024 after just three wins in 23 matches, with the club 21st in the Championship table and three points above the relegation places. Chairman Kevin M. Nagle conceded that there had been a raft of injuries at the Kirklees Stadium during the 2023–24 season, but was critical of the results and playing style seen under Moore. He was succeeded by André Breitenreiter.

=== Port Vale ===
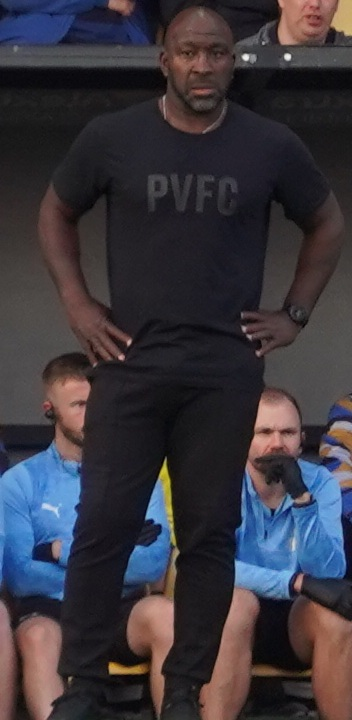
Moore as Port Vale manager, August 2025

On 13 February 2024, Moore was appointed as manager of relegation-threatened League One side Port Vale after being identified by director of football David Flitcroft as the "primary target to come in and galvanise and energise the club". He signed a five-and-a-half-year contract, which he said was "a testament to the long-term vision of the club" that was shared by owner Carol Shanahan, club staff and supporters. It took nine games for Moore to register his first win as Vale manager, a 1–0 victory at Burton Albion that left the club three points inside the relegation zone. Relegation was confirmed with one game left to play of the 2023–24 season with 11 defeats in Moore's first 16 games in charge.

Port Vale were sixth in League Two after ten games of the 2024–25 season, which led Moore to declare that he was "happy but not satisfied" with his team. He was named the EFL League Two Manager of the Month after picking up more points than any other manager in September, with the panel noting that "Moore had to gel a lot of new players and has done a brilliant job to get them organised so quickly". He won a second consecutive Manager of the Month award after Vale went to the top of League Two with 16 points from six unbeaten games. The Not the Top 20 Podcast podcast reported that Vale had an excellent all-round game as "the product of very good coaching". The team lost form at the end of the calendar year, however, and Moore was criticised for over-rotation in his team selections. They returned to the top of the table by April and Moore was shortlisted for the League Two Manager of the Season award at the EFL Awards. Promotion was secured with victory on the penultimate day of the season. He was nominated for the League Two Manager of the Month award.

He oversaw the arrival of 12 new players for the 2025–26 campaign, saying that League One was a step up, but was a "wonderful challenge". The team struggled in August, before collecting three wins from four league games in September to secure Moore a nomination for the League One Manager of the Month award. Form tailed off, however, and three straight defeats saw the club slip into the relegation zone in mid-November. On 28 December 2025, Moore was sacked with Vale sitting bottom of the league, ten points from safety.

=== England U20 ===
Moore was appointed head coach of the England national U20 team on 8 September 2026.

== Personal life ==
At Torquay, he was nicknamed "Bruno" due to his perceived likeness to professional boxer Frank Bruno. In contrast, at West Brom, he was known to supporters as "Big Dave" due to his likeness to a character in a Pot Noodle advert. He was made an Honorary Patron for the charity Show Racism the Red Card in September 2011, having been subject to racist abuse during both his playing and management career. During his playing career, he was also long-term member of the Professional Footballers' Association management committee.

Moore became a born-again Christian after being inspired by then-Bradford teammate Wayne Jacobs in 1997. Moore found his faith helped his career, providing confidence during good times and solace during times when he struggled with injury. He became active at the Renewal Christian Centre, a Free Methodist Church. Along with Linvoy Primus and Mick Mellows, he set up the Christian charity Faith and Football. He walked the Great Wall of China in summer 2005 as part of the charity's efforts to raise £100,000 for Prospect Children's School in Ibadan, Nigeria and a new medical centre, school and orphanage for a village in Goa. He also was an ambassador for the charity Inspire Afrika, assisting with a fundraising effort to help to run a school project in Kenya. He received an Honorary Degree from the University of Derby in July 2025 as the institute "recognised [him] for his values, engagement with the community and charity work".

His brother, David Moore, was an academy player at Aston Villa and later settled in Finland, where he played for MyPa and worked as a first-team administrator for Veikkausliiga club Inter Turku.

== Career statistics ==
=== Club ===
Appearances and goals by club, season and competition
Club	Season	League			FA Cup		League Cup		Other		Total	
Club	Season	Division	Apps	Goals	Apps	Goals	Apps	Goals	Apps	Goals	Apps	Goals
Torquay United	1991–92	Third Division	5	1	0	0	0	0	0	0	5	1
Torquay United	1992–93	Third Division	31	2	1	0	2	0	3 (Note: Appearance(s) in Football League Trophy)	0	37	2
Torquay United	1993–94	Third Division	37	2	2	1	2	0	3 (Note: one appearance in Football League Trophy, two appearances and goal in Third Division play-offs)	1	44	4
Torquay United	1994–95	Third Division	30	3	4	0	2	0	2	1	38	4
Torquay United	Total		103	8	7	1	6	0	8	2	124	11
Doncaster Rovers	1995–96	Third Division	35	2	1	0	2	0	2	1	40	3
Doncaster Rovers	1996–97	Third Division	41	5	0	0	2	0	1	0	44	5
Doncaster Rovers	Total		76	7	1	0	4	0	3	1	84	8
Bradford City	1997–98	First Division	18	0	0	0	0	0	—		18	0
Bradford City	1998–99	First Division	44	3	2	0	5	1	—		51	4
Bradford City	1999–2000	Premier League	0	0	—		1	0	—		1	0
Bradford City	Total		62	3	2	0	6	1	0	0	70	4
Portsmouth	1999–2000	First Division	25	1	1	0	—		—		26	1
Portsmouth	2000–01	First Division	32	1	1	0	4	0	—		37	1
Portsmouth	2001–02	First Division	2	0	—		1	0	—		3	0
Portsmouth	Total		59	2	2	0	5	0	0	0	66	2
West Bromwich Albion	2001–02	First Division	32	2	4	0	—		—		36	2
West Bromwich Albion	2002–03	Premier League	29	2	2	0	0	0	—		31	2
West Bromwich Albion	2003–04	First Division	22	2	1	0	0	0	—		23	2
West Bromwich Albion	2004–05	Premier League	16	0	0	0	1	0	—		17	0
West Bromwich Albion	2005–06	Premier League	5	0	1	0	3	0	—		9	0
West Bromwich Albion	Total		104	6	8	0	4	0	0	0	116	6
Derby County	2005–06	Championship	14	1	—		—		—		14	1
Derby County	2006–07	Championship	35	2	3	0	1	1	3 (Note: Appearances in Championship play-offs)	1	42	4
Derby County	2007–08	Premier League	31	0	2	0	1	0	—		34	0
Derby County	Total		80	3	5	0	2	1	3	1	90	5
Barnsley	2008–09	Championship	38	1	0	0	1	0	—		39	1
Barnsley	2009–10	Championship	35	1	0	0	2	0	—		37	1
Barnsley	Total		73	2	0	0	3	0	0	0	76	2
Burton Albion	2010–11	League Two	34	0	3	0	0	0	0	0	37	0
Burton Albion	2011–12	League Two	4	0	0	0	0	0	1	0	5	0
Burton Albion	Total		38	0	3	0	0	0	1	0	42	0
Career total			595	31	28	1	30	2	15	4	668	38

=== International ===
Appearances and goals by national team and year
National team	Year	Apps	Goals
Jamaica	1999	1	0
Jamaica	2000	1	0
Total		2	0

=== Managerial ===
As of match played 26 December 2025

Managerial record by team and tenure
Team	From	To	Record					Ref.
Team	From	To	P	W	D	L	Win %	Ref.
West Bromwich Albion	2 April 2018	9 March 2019	48	23	13	12	47.92	
Doncaster Rovers	10 July 2019	1 March 2021	78	35	15	28	44.87	
Sheffield Wednesday	1 March 2021	19 June 2023	129	66	34	29	51.16	
Huddersfield Town	21 September 2023	29 January 2024	23	3	11	9	13.04	
Port Vale	13 February 2024	28 December 2025	100	36	27	37	36.00	
England U20	8 September 2026	Present	0	0	0	0	—	
Total			378	163	99	116	43.12	

== Honours ==
=== Player ===
Doncaster Rovers

- Yorkshire Electricity Cup: 1996

Bradford City

- Football League First Division second-place promotion: 1998–99

West Bromwich Albion

- Football League First Division second-place promotion: 2001–02, 2003–04

Derby County

- Football League Championship play-offs: 2007

Individual

- Torquay United Young Player of the Year: 1992–93
- Doncaster Rovers Player of the Year: 1995–96
- PFA Team of the Year: 1998–99 First Division, 2001–02 First Division, 2006–07 Championship
- Doncaster Rovers Hall of Fame inductee: 2020

=== Manager ===
Sheffield Wednesday

- EFL League One play-offs: 2023

Port Vale

- EFL League Two second-place promotion: 2024–25

Individual

- Premier League Manager of the Month: April 2018
- EFL Championship Manager of the Month: September 2018
- EFL League Two Manager of the Month: September 2024, October 2024
