= 2007–08 Bolton Wanderers F.C. season =

Bolton Wanderers
2007–08 season
- Chairman: Phil Gartside
- Manager: Sammy Lee (until 17 October); Gary Megson (from 25 October)
- Stadium: Reebok Stadium
- Premier League: 16th
- FA Cup: Third round
- League Cup: Fourth round
- UEFA Cup: Round of 16
- Top goalscorer: League: Nicolas Anelka (10); All: Nicolas Anelka (11)
- Highest home attendance: 26,163 (vs. Atlético Madrid, 14 February 2008)
- Lowest home attendance: 10,229 (vs. Aris, 29 November 2007)
Home colours	Away colours

The 2007–08 season was the 130th season in Bolton Wanderers F.C.'s existence, and was their 7th consecutive year in the top-flight, and covers the period from 1 July 2007 to 30 June 2008. Having finished seventh the previous season, Bolton had qualified for the UEFA Cup.

== Regular season ==
After finishing runners-up in the Peace Cup Bolton entered the new season under the management of Sammy Lee. Lee, who had previously worked under former manager Sam Allardyce, had taken over from Allardyce towards the end of the previous season, but had yet to record a league win.

The league season kicked off at home, against Newcastle United, now managed by Allardyce. Three first-half goals for Newcastle ensured an early defeat. This was followed by an away defeat to Fulham. By the time Bolton lost 3–1 to Portsmouth, the club found itself at the bottom of the league. However, a 3–0 win over Reading lifted them off the basement. Another bright note was that striker Nicolas Anelka had found the net in three of the four games in August and found himself towards the top of the Premier League scoring charts.

Back to back defeats to Everton and Birmingham City saw Bolton quickly return to the bottom three and Lee come under pressure for his job. An unconvincing away draw in the UEFA Cup to Macedonian side FK Rabotnički, only saved by a late equaliser from Abdoulaye Méïté, was followed by a 1–1 home draw against fellow strugglers Tottenham Hotspur. Much-needed relief was found in an extra time win over Fulham in the Carling Cup but an early season six pointer against bottom side Derby County only yielded a draw and meant that Bolton finished September only one place above their opponents.

The UEFA Cup home leg against Rabotnički was won 1–0 with another goal from Anelka. However, if Bolton were looking for an easy passage through the group stage they were disappointed as the draw put them up against former European Cup winners Bayern Munich and Red Star Belgrade as well as highly regarded Portuguese side Braga and Aris from Greece. Meanwhile, there appeared to be problems at the club behind-the-scenes, marked by the confusion when Gary Speed stepped down as player-coach. However, there was little confusion to what happened following Bolton's 1–0 home defeat to Chelsea on 15 October, with Lee being relieved of his duties on the Monday. Assistant manager Archie Knox was put in temporary charge until a new manager was found. Steve Bruce, Paul Jewell and Chris Coleman were linked to the job. In the meantime, Bolton lost again, this time to Arsenal 2–0 on 25 October Gary Megson was appointed as manager following his resignation from Leicester City. While chairman Phil Gartside said, "We feel Gary is the right man to take Bolton forward," some fans were decidedly unimpressed, stating that it was "possibly the most bizarre and clueless appointment this season". Megson sat in the dugout for 1–1 draw that evening at home to Braga in the UEFA Cup before taking charge fully in the home game against Aston Villa, that also finished 1–1. The month finished with Bolton being knocked out of the Carling Cup by Manchester City 1–0, the game being settled late on by a controversial penalty.

A late Kevin Nolan goal saved the day at West Ham United in the first game in November. Bolton then travelled to Germany to take on Bayern Munich. Few fancied Bolton to come away with a result, but an early goal from Ricardo Gardner and a late equaliser from Kevin Davies gave Bolton a valuable point in their attempt to qualify from the group stage. Seemingly buoyed by this result Bolton finished the month unbeaten, drawing 0–0 with Middlesbrough, beating Manchester United 1–0 (giving Megson his first win as manager and Bolton's first home win against their neighbours for thirty years) and drawing with Aris in the UEFA Cup, Stelios Giannakopoulos scoring an injury-time equaliser against his countrymen.

Bolton's busiest month of the campaign started with a 4–0 hammering at the hands of Liverpool at Anfield. but this was quickly followed by another famous European night as Red Star Belgrade were beaten 1–0 as Bolton qualified for the last thirty-two of the UEFA Cup, the occasion slightly marred when some fans were held in a hotel in the Serbian capital. This was followed by a 4–1 derby win over Wigan Athletic, in what turned out to be Gary Speed's last game for the club, and another defeat to Manchester City, 4–2. When the draw for the last 32 of the UEFA Cup was made, Bolton were given another tough draw, paired with Spaniards Atlético Madrid. The day after the draw was made fellow strugglers Birmingham City were despatched 3–0, but this was followed by two defeats over the Christmas period to Everton and Sunderland.

The new year started with an unconvincing last-minute win over Derby County, Stelios Giannakopoulos again coming up with a winner. The game proved to be Nicolas Anelka's last game for the club before he was sold to Chelsea for £15 million. Other players to leave in the transfer window were Gary Speed, Christian Wilhelmsson, Gérald Cid and Ľubomír Michalík. Megson used this opportunity to strengthen the defence with the purchases of Grétar Steinsson from AZ and Gary Cahill from Aston Villa. Matt Taylor, who had scored against Bolton earlier in the season for his previous club Portsmouth, was also brought in, as was Tamir Cohen from Maccabi Netanya. Surprisingly, the only like-for-like replacement for Anelka brought in was Grzegorz Rasiak on loan from Championship side Southampton. An early FA Cup defeat to Sheffield United could be put down to Megson putting out a largely reserve side. This was followed by another derby defeat this time at home to Blackburn Rovers before two successive 0–0 draws, away to Newcastle United, by now managed by Kevin Keegan, and then home to Fulham.

A 2–0 victory over Reading gave Bolton a much-needed three points over relegation rivals and gave them their first double over a team for the season but this proved to be Bolton's last win in the league until mid-April as they embarked on a run that put them back into the bottom three. A game that they dominated against Portsmouth ended up as a 1–0 defeat. The next two games were the UEFA Cup home-and-away legs against Atlético Madrid. A 1–0 victory at home, courtesy of an El Hadji Diouf goal, was followed by a 0–0 draw away, meaning that Bolton would go further in Europe this season than in their previous UEFA Cup attempt two seasons previously. However, there was trouble again for some Bolton fans, with 17 being injured in what was seen as "heavy handed tactics" by Spanish police. Both Bolton and Atlético were subject to a UEFA investigation. Bolton were drawn against Sporting CP in the last 16 of the competition. On their return home, Bolton were beaten again by Blackburn Rovers, 4–1.

Bolton's season reached its nadir in the month of March, with only one point being gained in the league. A 3–1 defeat to Liverpool was epitomised by a bizarre own goal scored by Jussi Jääskeläinen. Bolton then met Sporting Lisbon home and away in the UEFA Cup. A 1–1 draw at home was followed by a 1–0 defeat away. Megson suffered criticism as again he had put a weakened side out in a cup competition, but he vindicated his choice by stating that Premiership survival was more important. Fans who had travelled to Lisbon for the game were not happy with this excuse and they were made to feel worse when a virtually wholly changed side lost to Wigan Athletic in the following league game, despite being up against ten men for the majority of the game. In the following game, Cristiano Ronaldo put two early goals into Bolton's net to continue Manchester United's push for the title. Despite picking up a point a week later at home to United's city rivals with a goalless draw, a week later Bolton managed to snatch defeat from the jaws of victory by throwing away a two-goal lead against ten-man Arsenal to lose 2–3.

Bolton entered April knowing that they would probably have to go undefeated through to the end of the season to avoid relegation, but got off to the worst possible start with a 4–0 defeat to Aston Villa. However, two successive victories at home to West Ham and away to Middlesbrough took them out of the bottom three and left them in control of their own destiny, even after being outplayed but still drawing at Tottenham.

Bolton's penultimate game of the season, at home to Sunderland, kicked off at 5:15pm with Bolton having the knowledge that, as Birmingham City and Reading had lost earlier that day, a win would virtually secure their Premiership status. And win they did, with goalscorer El Hadji Diouf doing a personal lap of honour at the end of the game after stating that he would be leaving the club, even though he was not out of contract. The final game, away to title-chasing Chelsea, finished 1–1, with Matt Taylor scoring Bolton's final goal of the season and ensuring that they did not avoid relegation on goal difference.

=== Matches ===
==== Results by matchday ====
Matchday	1	2	3	4	5	6	7	8	9	10	11	12	13	14	15	16	17	18	19	20	21	22	23	24	25	26	27	28	29	30	31	32	33	34	35	36	37	38
Ground	H	A	A	H	H	A	H	A	H	A	H	A	H	H	A	H	A	H	A	A	H	H	A	H	A	H	A	H	A	H	A	H	A	H	A	A	H	A
Result	L	L	L	W	L	L	D	D	L	L	D	D	D	W	L	W	L	W	L	L	W	L	D	D	W	L	L	L	L	L	D	L	L	W	W	D	W	D
Position	19	19	20	18	19	20	19	19	19	20	19	19	18	15	17	14	16	14	15	16	14	15	15	15	14	15	16	17	18	18	18	18	18	18	16	16	16	16

Source: Statto.com
A = Away; H = Home; W = Win; D = Draw; L = Loss

11 August 2007	Bolton Wanderers	1–3	Newcastle United	Reebok Stadium
15:00 BST	Anelka 50'	Report	N'Zogbia 11'; Martins 21', 27'	Attendance: 25,414; Referee: Chris Foy

15 August 2007	Fulham	2–1	Bolton Wanderers	Craven Cottage
19:45 BST	Healy 23'; Cid 26' (o.g.)	Report	Helguson 12'	Attendance: 21,102; Referee: Lee Probert

18 August 2007	Portsmouth	3–1	Bolton Wanderers	Fratton Park
12:45 BST	Kanu 16'; Utaka 30'; Taylor 88' (pen.)	Report	Anelka 12'	Attendance: 17,108; Referee: Steve Tanner

25 August 2007	Bolton Wanderers	3–0	Reading	Reebok Stadium
15:00 BST	Speed 32'; Anelka 55'; Braaten 91'	Report		Attendance: 20,023; Referee: Mark Clattenburg

1 September 2007	Bolton Wanderers	1–2	Everton	Reebok Stadium
15:00 BST	Anelka 55'	Report	Yakubu 11'; Lescott 90'	Attendance: 22,064; Referee: Peter Walton

15 September 2007	Birmingham City	1–0	Bolton Wanderers	St Andrew's Stadium
15:00 BST	Kapo 37'; Ridgewell (yellow card) 55'	Report	Nolan (yellow card) 34'; Speed (yellow card) 57'; O'Brien (yellow card) 75'	Attendance: 28,124; Referee: Phil Dowd

23 September 2007	Bolton Wanderers	1–1	Tottenham Hotspur	Reebok Stadium
15:00 BST	Campo 39'	Report	Keane 34'	Attendance: 20,308; Referee: Andre Marriner

29 September 2007	Derby County	1–1	Bolton Wanderers	Pride Park Stadium
15:00 BST	Miller 19'	Report	Anelka 32'	Attendance: 31,503; Referee: Rob Styles

7 October 2007	Bolton Wanderers	0–1	Chelsea	Reebok Stadium
15:00 BST		Report	Kalou 41'	Attendance: 20,059; Referee: Alan Wiley

20 October 2007	Arsenal	2–0	Bolton Wanderers	Emirates Stadium
15:00 BST	Touré 68'; Rosický 80'	Report		Attendance: 59,442; Referee: Mike Riley

28 October 2007	Bolton Wanderers	1–1	Aston Villa	Reebok Stadium
15:00 BST	Anelka 22'	Report	Moore 57'	Attendance: 18,413; Referee: Martin Atkinson

4 November 2007	West Ham United	1–1	Bolton Wanderers	Boleyn Ground
15:00 GMT	George McCartney 20'	Report	Kevin Nolan 93'	Attendance: 33,867 (89 away); Referee: Peter Walton

11 November 2007	Bolton Wanderers	0–0	Middlesbrough	Reebok Stadium
15:00 GMT		Report		Attendance: 17,624; Referee: Lee Probert

24 November 2007	Bolton Wanderers	1–0	Manchester United	Reebok Stadium
15:00 GMT	Anelka 11'	Report		Attendance: 25,028; Referee: Mark Clattenburg

2 December 2007	Liverpool	4–0	Bolton Wanderers	Anfield
15:00 GMT	Hyypiä 17'; Torres 45'; Gerrard 46'; Babel 66'	Report		Attendance: 43,270; Referee: Steve Bennett

9 December 2007	Bolton Wanderers	4–1	Wigan Athletic	Reebok Stadium
15:00 GMT	Scharner 3' (o.g.); Nolan 37'; Davies 70'; Anelka 89'	Report	Landzaat 14'	Attendance: 20,309; Referee: Martin Atkinson

15 December 2007	Manchester City	4–2	Bolton Wanderers	City of Manchester Stadium
15:00 GMT	Bianchi 7'; Michalík 48' (o.g.); Vassell 77'; Etuhu 90+4'	Report	Diouf 31'; Nolan 40'	Attendance: 40,506; Referee: Peter Walton

22 December 2007	Bolton Wanderers	3–0	Birmingham City	Reebok Stadium
15:00 GMT	Diouf 72'; Anelka 78', 93'	Report		Attendance: 19,111; Referee: Chris Foy

26 December 2007	Everton	2–0	Bolton Wanderers	Goodison Park
15:00 GMT	Neville 51'; Cahill 70'	Report		Attendance: 38,918; Referee: Rob Styles

29 December 2007	Sunderland	3–1	Bolton Wanderers	Stadium of Light
15:00 GMT	Richardson 13'; Jones 32'; Murphy 91'	Report	Diouf 41'	Attendance: 42,058; Referee: Phil Dowd

2 January 2008	Bolton Wanderers	1–0	Derby County	Reebok Stadium
20:00 GMT	Giannakopoulos 90+1'	Report		Attendance: 17,014; Referee: Howard Webb

13 January 2008	Bolton Wanderers	1–2	Blackburn Rovers	Reebok Stadium
16:00 GMT	Nolan 43'	Report	Samba 53'; Roberts 90'	Attendance: 18,315; Referee: Mike Dean

19 January 2008	Newcastle United	0–0	Bolton Wanderers	St. James' Park
15:00 GMT		Report		Attendance: 52,250; Referee: Alan Wiley

29 January 2008	Bolton Wanderers	0–0	Fulham	Reebok Stadium
20:00 GMT		Report		Attendance: 17,732; Referee: Mark Clattenburg

2 February 2008	Reading	0–2	Bolton Wanderers	Madjeski Stadium
15:00 GMT		Report	Nolan 33'; Helguson 58'	Attendance: 21,893; Referee: Rob Styles

9 February 2008	Bolton Wanderers	0–1	Portsmouth	Reebok Stadium
15:00 GMT		Report	Diarra 81'	Attendance: 18,544; Referee: Peter Walton

24 February 2008	Blackburn Rovers	4–1	Bolton Wanderers	Ewood Park
15:00 GMT	McCarthy 25' (pen.) 67' (pen.); Bentley 71'; Pederson 94'	Report	Davies 50'	Attendance: 23,995; Referee: Mark Clattenburg

2 March 2008	Bolton Wanderers	1–3	Liverpool	Reebok Stadium
13:30 GMT	Cohen 79'	Report	Jääskeläinen 10' (o.g.); Babel 60'; Aurélio 75'	Attendance: 24,004; Referee: Phil Dowd

16 March 2008	Wigan Athletic	1–0	Bolton Wanderers	JJB Stadium
15:00 GMT	Heskey 33'	Report		Attendance: 17,055; Referee: Steve Tanner

19 March 2008	Manchester United	2–0	Bolton Wanderers	Old Trafford
20:00 GMT	Ronaldo 9', 19'	Report		Attendance: 75,476; Referee: Alan Wiley

22 March 2008	Bolton Wanderers	0–0	Manchester City	Reebok Stadium
15:00 GMT		Report		Attendance: 22,633; Referee: Andre Marriner

29 March 2008	Bolton Wanderers	2–3	Arsenal	Reebok Stadium
15:00 GMT	Taylor 14', 43'	Report	Gallas 62'; Van Persie 68' (pen.); Samuel 91' (o.g.)	Attendance: 22,431; Referee: Chris Foy

5 April 2008	Aston Villa	4–0	Bolton Wanderers	Villa Park
15:00 BST	Gareth Barry 54' 60'; Agbonlahor 56'; Harewood 85'	Report		Attendance: 37,773; Referee: Martin Atkinson

12 April 2008	Bolton Wanderers	1–0	West Ham United	Reebok Stadium
15:00 BST	Davies 47'	Report		Attendance: 23,043; Referee: Peter Walton

19 April 2008	Middlesbrough	0–1	Bolton Wanderers	Riverside Stadium
15:00 BST		Report	McCann 61'	Attendance: 25,037; Referee: Alan Wiley

26 April 2008	Tottenham Hotspur	1–1	Bolton Wanderers	White Hart Lane
15:00 BST	Malbranque 52'	Report	Giannakopoulos 46'	Attendance: 36,176; Referee: Mark Clattenburg

3 May 2008	Bolton Wanderers	2–0	Sunderland	Reebok Stadium
17:15 BST	Diouf 42'; Murphy 83' (o.g.)	Report		Attendance: 25,053; Referee: Martin Atkinson

11 May 2008	Chelsea	1–1	Bolton Wanderers	Stamford Bridge
15:00 BST	Shevchenko 62'	Report	Taylor 90+3'	Attendance: 41,755; Referee: Chris Foy

=== Final league table ===
Pos	Team	Pld	W	D	L	GF	GA	GD	Pts	Qualification or relegation
14	Wigan Athletic	38	10	10	18	34	51	−17	40	
15	Sunderland	38	11	6	21	36	59	−23	39	
16	Bolton Wanderers	38	9	10	19	36	54	−18	37	
17	Fulham	38	8	12	18	38	60	−22	36	
18	Reading (R)	38	10	6	22	41	66	−25	36	Relegation to Football League Championship

Source: Barclays Premier League
Rules for classification: 1) points; 2) goal difference; 3) number of goals scored.
For further information on European qualification see Premier League – Competition
(R) Relegated

== FA Cup ==
5 January 2008 R3	Bolton Wanderers	0–1	Sheffield United	Reebok Stadium
15:00 GMT		Report	Carney 42'	Attendance: 15,286; Referee: Peter Walton

== League Cup ==
26 September 2007 R3	Fulham	1–2 (a.e.t.)	Bolton Wanderers	Craven Cottage
20:00 BST	Healy 78'	Report	Guthrie 57'; Giannakopoulos 112'	Attendance: 10,500; Referee: Steve Bennett

31 October 2007 R4	Bolton Wanderers	0–1	Manchester City	Reebok Stadium
20:00 GMT		Report	Elano 86' (pen.)	Attendance: 15,510; Referee: Peter Walton

== UEFA Cup ==
=== First round ===
20 September 2007 1st Leg	Rabotnički	1–1	Bolton Wanderers	Skopje City Stadium
19:00 BST	Milisavlević 53'	Report	Méïté 84'	Attendance: 8,500; Referee: Zsolt Szabó

4 October 2007 2nd Leg	Bolton Wanderers	1–0	Rabotnički	Reebok Stadium
20:00 BST	Anelka 68'	Report		Attendance: 18,932 (80 away); Referee: Tommy Skjerven

=== Group stage ===
25 October 2007 Match 1	Bolton Wanderers	1–1	Braga	Reebok Stadium
20:00 BST	Diouf 66'	Report	Jaílson 87'	Attendance: 10,848 (31 away); Referee: Darko Ceferin

8 November 2007 Match 2	Bayern Munich	2–2	Bolton Wanderers	Allianz Arena
19:00 GMT	Podolski 30', 49'	Report	Gardner 8'; Davies 82'	Attendance: 66,000 (4,000 away); Referee: Jaroslav Jara

29 November 2007 Match 3	Bolton Wanderers	1–1	Aris	Reebok Stadium
20:00 GMT	Giannakopoulos 90+3'	Report	Toni 44'	Attendance: 10,229 (2,300 away); Referee: Eduardo Iturralde González

6 December 2007 Match 4	Red Star Belgrade	0–1	Bolton Wanderers	Stadion FK Crvena Zvezda
17:45 GMT		Report	McCann 45'	Attendance: 45,000 (400 away); Referee: Paul Allaerts

Pos	Team	Pld	W	D	L	GF	GA	GD	Pts	Qualification	BAY	BRA	BOL	ARI	RSB
1	(Germany) Bayern Munich	4	2	2	0	12	5	+7	8	Advance to knockout stage	—	—	2–2	6–0	—
2	(Portugal) Braga	4	1	3	0	5	3	+2	6	Advance to knockout stage	1–1	—	—	—	2–0
3	(England) Bolton Wanderers	4	1	3	0	5	4	+1	6	Advance to knockout stage	—	1–1	—	1–1	—
4	(Greece) Aris	4	1	2	1	5	8	−3	5		—	1–1	—	—	3–0
5	(Serbia) Red Star Belgrade	4	0	0	4	2	9	−7	0		2–3	—	0–1	—	—

=== Round of 32 ===
14 February 2008 1st Leg	Bolton Wanderers	1–0	Atlético Madrid	Reebok Stadium
20:00 GMT	Diouf 74'	Report		Attendance: 26,163; Referee: Peter Rasmussen

21 February 2008 2nd Leg	Atlético Madrid	0–0	Bolton Wanderers	Vicente Calderón Stadium
19:45 GMT		Report		Attendance: 30,000 (3,000 away); Referee: Jacek Granat

=== Round of 16 ===
6 March 2008 1st Leg	Bolton Wanderers	1–1	Sporting CP	Reebok Stadium
20:00 GMT	McCann 25'	Report	Vukčević 69'	Attendance: 25,664; Referee: Alon Yefet

13 March 2008 2nd Leg	Sporting CP	1–0	Bolton Wanderers	Estádio José Alvalade
20:00 GMT	Pereirinha 85'	Report		Attendance: 22,031; Referee: Bertrand Layec

== Squad statistics ==
=== Appearances ===
No.	Pos.	Name	League		FA Cup		League Cup		UEFA Cup		Total		Discipline	
No.	Pos.	Name	Apps	Goals	Apps	Goals	Apps	Goals	Apps	Goals	Apps	Goals	Yellow card	Red card
2	DF	(England) Nicky Hunt	14	0	1	0	1	0	8	0	24	0	8	0
3	DF	(England) Jlloyd Samuel	20	0	0	0	1	0	4	0	25	0	1	0
4	MF	(England) Kevin Nolan	33	5	0	0	1	0	5	0	39	5	1	0
5	DF	(Ivory Coast) Abdoulaye Méïté	21	0	1	0	2	0	6	1	30	1	3	0
6	MF	(Wales) Gary Speed	14	1	0	0	0	0	3	0	17	0	3	0
7	MF	(Greece) Stelios Giannakopoulos	15	2	1	0	2	1	8	1	26	3	0	0
8	MF	(Spain) Iván Campo	27	1	0	0	1	0	3	0	31	0	8	0
9	FW	(Iceland) Heiðar Helguson	6	2	0	0	0	0	2	0	8	2	1	0
10	MF	(Sweden) Christian Wilhelmsson	8	0	0	0	1	0	3	0	12	0	0	0
11	MF	(Jamaica) Ricardo Gardner	26	0	0	0	0	0	4	1	30	1	2	0
12	GK	(England) Ian Walker	0	0	0	0	0	0	0	0	0	0	0	0
14	FW	(England) Kevin Davies	32	3	0	0	1	0	8	1	41	4	13	0
15	DF	(France) Gérald Cid	7	0	1	0	1	0	5	0	14	0	4	0
15	DF	(Iceland) Grétar Steinsson	16	0	0	0	0	0	0	0	16	0	2	0
16	MF	(Iran) Andranik Teymourian	3	0	0	0	1	0	5	0	9	0	1	0
17	MF	(England) Danny Guthrie	25	0	1	0	2	1	7	0	35	1	5	0
18	MF	(Spain) Mikel Alonso	7	0	0	0	2	0	3	0	12	0	0	0
19	MF	(England) Gavin McCann	31	1	0	0	2	0	8	2	41	3	8	0
20	FW	(Portugal) Ricardo Vaz Tê	1	0	0	0	0	0	1	0	2	0	0	0
21	MF	(Senegal) El Hadji Diouf	34	4	1	0	1	0	6	2	42	6	16	0
22	GK	(Finland) Jussi Jääskeläinen	28	0	0	0	1	0	6	0	35	0	2	0
23	MF	(Switzerland) Blerim Džemaili	0	0	1	0	0	0	0	0	1	0	0	0
24	DF	(Republic of Ireland) Joey O'Brien	19	0	1	0	1	0	5	0	26	0	3	0
25	DF	(Senegal) Abdoulaye Faye	1	0	1	0	0	0	0	0	1	0	0	0
25	MF	(Israel) Tamir Cohen	10	1	1	0	0	0	0	0	11	1	2	0
26	GK	(Oman) Ali Al-Habsi	10	0	1	0	1	0	4	0	16	0	0	0
27	MF	(Norway) Daniel Braaten	6	1	1	0	2	0	5	0	14	1	1	0
28	DF	(Slovakia) Ľubomír Michalík	7	0	1	0	2	0	3	0	13	0	1	0
29	FW	(Slovakia) Zoltán Harsányi	0	0	0	0	0	0	0	0	0	0	0	0
31	DF	(Republic of Ireland) Andy O'Brien	32	0	1	0	1	0	8	0	42	0	7	0
32	MF	(England) Matthew Taylor	16	3	0	0	0	0	3	0	19	3	1	0
33	DF	(England) Gary Cahill	13	0	0	0	0	0	4	0	17	0	0	0
37	FW	(England) James Sinclair	0	0	0	0	0	0	1	0	1	0	0	0
39	FW	(France) Nicolas Anelka	18	10	0	0	0	0	4	1	22	11	1	0
41	DF	(Poland) Jarosław Fojut	0	0	0	0	0	0	0	0	0	0	0	0
42	FW	(United States) Johann Smith	0	0	0	0	0	0	0	0	0	0	0	0
43	FW	(England) Nathan Woolfe	0	0	0	0	0	0	1	0	1	0	0	0
46	DF	(Australia) Scott Jamieson	0	0	0	0	0	0	0	0	0	0	0	0
47	FW	(Poland) Grzegorz Rasiak	7	0	0	0	0	0	0	0	7	0	1	0
–	–	Own goals	–	2	–	0	–	0	–	0	-	2		

Statistics accurate as of match played 11 May 2008

== Transfers ==
=== In ===
Date	Pos.	Name	From	Fee
1 July 2007	DF	(France) Gérald Cid	(France) Bordeaux	Free
1 July 2007	MF	(Switzerland) Blerim Džemaili	(Switzerland) Zürich	Free
1 July 2007	MF	(England) Gavin McCann	(England) Aston Villa	£1,000,000
1 July 2007	DF	(Trinidad and Tobago) Jlloyd Samuel	(England) Aston Villa	Free
23 July 2007	FW	(Iceland) Heiðar Helguson	(England) Fulham	£2,451,000
1 August 2007	MF	(Norway) Daniel Braaten	(Norway) Rosenborg	£645,000
13 August 2007	DF	(Republic of Ireland) Andy O'Brien	(England) Portsmouth	Undisclosed
1 January 2008	MF	(Israel) Tamir Cohen	(Israel) Maccabi Netanya	£650,000
16 January 2008	DF	(Iceland) Grétar Steinsson	(Netherlands) AZ	£3,500,000
17 January 2008	MF	(England) Matthew Taylor	(England) Portsmouth	£4,042,019
30 January 2008	DF	(England) Gary Cahill	(England) Aston Villa	£5,000,000

=== Out ===
Date	Pos.	Name	To	Fee
1 July 2007	DF	(Israel) Tal Ben Haim	(England) Chelsea	Free
1 July 2007	MF	(England) Michael Roddy	(England) Lincoln City	Free
1 July 2007	FW	(Denmark) Henrik Pedersen	(England) Hull City	Free
5 July 2007	MF	(Israel) Idan Tal	(Israel) Beitar Jerusalem	Free
31 August 2007	DF	(Senegal) Abdoulaye Faye	(England) Newcastle United	£2,408,011
1 January 2008	MF	(Wales) Gary Speed	(England) Sheffield United	£250,000
10 January 2008	DF	(France) Gérald Cid	(France) Nice	Free
11 January 2008	FW	(France) Nicolas Anelka	(England) Chelsea	£15,000,000
31 January 2008	GK	(Poland) Przemysław Kazimierczak	(England) Darlington	Free
31 January 2008	DF	(Slovakia) Ľubomír Michalík	(England) Leeds United	£500,000

=== Loan in ===
Date from	Date to	Pos.	Name	From	Reference
3 July 2007	30 June 2008	MF	(England) Danny Guthrie	(England) Liverpool	
10 July 2007	30 June 2008	MF	(Spain) Mikel Alonso	(Spain) Real Sociedad	
27 July 2007	30 January 2008	MF	(Sweden) Christian Wilhelmsson	(France) Nantes	
31 January 2008	30 June 2008	FW	(Poland) Grzegorz Rasiak	(England) Southampton	

=== Loan out ===
Date from	Date to	Pos.	Name	To	Reference
31 August 2007	2 January 2008	DF	(England) Jarosław Fojut	(England) Luton Town	
21 September 2007	27 April 2008	MF	(England) Mark Ellis	(England) Torquay United	
28 September 2007	28 October 2007	GK	(Poland) Przemysław Kazimierczak	(England) Wycombe Wanderers	
5 October 2007	5 November 2007	MF	(England) Leslie Thompson	(England) Stockport County	
12 October 2007	12 November 2007	FW	(United States) Johann Smith	(England) Darlington	
3 January 2008	24 January 2008	MF	(England) Leslie Thompson	(England) Torquay United	
7 February 2008	20 May 2008	MF	(England) Chris Basham	(England) Rochdale	
20 March 2008	20 April 2008	FW	(United States) Johann Smith	(England) Stockport County	
