= 2001–02 West Bromwich Albion F.C. season =

West Bromwich Albion
2001–02 season
- Chairman: Paul Thompson
- Manager: Gary Megson
- Stadium: The Hawthorns
- Football League First Division: 2nd (promoted)
- FA Cup: Sixth round
- League Cup: Third round
- Top goalscorer: League: Scott Dobie (10); All: Scott Dobie (12)
- Highest home attendance: League: 26,701 (vs. Crystal Palace F.C., 21 April 2002); All: 27,179 (vs. Cheltenham Town, FA Cup fifth round, 16 February 2002)
- Lowest home attendance: League: 17,335 (vs. Millwall, 11 October 2001); All: 14,536 (vs. Swindon Town, League Cup second round, 11 September 2001)
- Average home league attendance: League: 20,691

The 2001–02 season was West Bromwich Albion's 106th season in The Football League. The team had lost in the playoff semi-final to Bolton Wanderers in 2000–01, meaning that they would be playing in the Football League First Division for the ninth consecutive season, their 33rd season in total at the second level of English football.

Albion won eight and drew two of their last ten league games and sealed promotion by beating Crystal Palace on the final day of the season. The club's success was built on a solid defence; although only 12th in the division in terms of goals scored, they conceded just 29 times, the fewest goals the club has ever conceded in a league season of 42 or more games. The team kept a club record 27 clean sheets (24 of which were in the league), including 17 1–0 wins (15 in the league).

The £7.5 million East Stand at the club's home ground, The Hawthorns, was completed in time for the start of the season. It replaced the old 'Rainbow Stand', which had been built in 1964.

== Kit ==
West Bromwich Albion retained the previous season's kit, manufactured by Patrick and sponsored by the West Bromwich Building Society.

== Players ==
=== First-team squad ===
Note: Flags indicate national team as defined under FIFA eligibility rules; some limited exceptions apply. Players may hold more than one non-FIFA nationality.

No.	Pos.	Nation	Player
1	GK	ENG	Russell Hoult
2	DF	ENG	Des Lyttle
3	DF	ENG	Neil Clement
4	MF	SCO	Derek McInnes
5	DF	ENG	Tony Butler
6	DF	ENG	Phil Gilchrist
7	MF	ENG	Ruel Fox (Note: Fox was born in Norwich, England, and played for the England B team, but also qualified to represent Montserrat internationally and would make his international debut for Montserrat in 2004.)
8	MF	ENG	Michael Appleton
9	FW	ENG	Bob Taylor
10	MF	WAL	Andy Johnson (Note: Johnson was born in Bristol, England, but also qualified to represent Wales internationally and made his international debut for Wales in 1998.)
11	FW	GRN	Jason Roberts (Note: Roberts was born in Park Royal, England, but also qualified to represent Grenada internationally through his father and made his international debut for Grenada in 1998.)
12	FW	NIR	James Quinn (Note: Quinn was born in Coventry, England, but also qualified to represent Northern Ireland internationally and made his international debut for Northern Ireland in 1996.)

No.	Pos.	Nation	Player
14	FW	ENG	Daniele Dichio
15	DF	JAM	Darren Moore (Note: Moore was born in Birmingham, England, but also qualified to represent Jamaica internationally and made his international debut for Jamaica in 1999.)
16	DF	SVK	Igor Bališ
17	DF	ISL	Lárus Sigurðsson
18	FW	SCO	Scott Dobie (Note: Dobie was born in Workington, England, but also qualified to represent Scotland internationally and made his international debut for Scotland in 2002.)
19	DF	SCO	Warren Cummings (on loan from Chelsea)
20	MF	POR	Jordão (Note: Jordão was born in Malanje, Portuguese Angola (now Angola), but also qualified to represent Portugal internationally and represented them at U-21 level.)
21	GK	DEN	Brian Jensen
22	DF	ENG	James Chambers
23	DF	ENG	Adam Chambers
26	DF	SVK	Stanislav Varga (on loan from Sunderland)
27	FW	ENG	Trevor Benjamin (Note: Benjamin was born in Kettering, England, and represented them at U-21 level, but also qualified to represent Jamaica internationally and would make his international debut for Jamaica in November 2002.) (on loan from Leicester City)

=== Left club during season ===
Note: Flags indicate national team as defined under FIFA eligibility rules; some limited exceptions apply. Players may hold more than one non-FIFA nationality.

No.	Pos.	Nation	Player
10	FW	ENG	Lee Hughes (to Coventry City)
25	FW	GER	Uwe Rösler (on loan from Southampton)

No.	Pos.	Nation	Player
26	MF	ITA	Massimiliano Iezzi (released)

=== Reserve squad ===
Note: Flags indicate national team as defined under FIFA eligibility rules; some limited exceptions apply. Players may hold more than one non-FIFA nationality.

No.	Pos.	Nation	Player
24	MF	ENG	Adam Oliver
28	FW	ENG	Matthew Turner
29	MF	ENG	Mark Briggs
30	GK	ENG	Chris Adamson
31	GK	NIR	Elliot Morris

No.	Pos.	Nation	Player
32	DF	ENG	Matt Collins
33	FW	ENG	Mark Scott
34	GK	AUS	Andy Petterson
—	MF	ENG	Lloyd Dyer

== Match results ==
=== Legend ===
Win	Draw	Loss

=== Football League First Division ===
Game	Date	Opponent	Venue	Result	Attendance	Goalscorers	Notes
1	11 August 2001	Walsall	Away	1–2	9,181 (2,000)	Clement	
2	18 August 2001	Grimsby Town	Home	0–1	17,921 (684)		
3	25 August 2001	Sheffield Wednesday	Away	1–1	18,844 (1,865)	Dichio	
4	27 August 2001	Gillingham	Home	1–0	18,180 (832)	Dichio	
5	8 September 2001	Manchester City	Home	4–0	23,524 (4,892)	McInnes, Clement (2, 1 pen), Dobie	
6	15 September 2001	Watford	Away	2–1	15,726 (1,974)	Dobie (2)	
7	18 September 2001	Preston North End	Home	2–0	18,289 (893)	Dobie (2)	
8	22 September 2001	Wimbledon	Home	0–1	19,222 (388)		
9	25 September 2001	Portsmouth	Away	2–1	17,287 (1,268)	Clement, Dobie	
10	29 September 2001	Burnley	Home	1–0	21,442 (2,503)	Dobie	
11	11 October 2001	Millwall	Home	0–2	17,335 (378)		
12	16 October 2001	Stockport County	Away	2–1	6,052 (1,276)	Taylor (2)	
13	19 October 2001	Norwich City	Away	0–2	20,465 (1,173)		
14	25 October 2001	Wolverhampton Wanderers	Home	1–1	26,143 (5,186)	Clement	
15	28 October 2001	Barnsley	Away	2–3	12,490 (853)	Johnson, Clement	
16	31 October 2001	Crystal Palace	Away	1–0	17,273 (1,202)	Taylor	
17	4 November 2001	Nottingham Forest	Home	1–0	18,281 (1,300)	Rösler	
18	7 November 2001	Birmingham City	Away	1–0	23,554	Johnson	
19	17 November 2001	Rotherham United	Away	1–2	8,509 (2,400)	Moore	
20	24 November 2001	Bradford City	Home	1–0	18,910 (944)	McInnes	
21	2 December 2001	Wolverhampton Wanderers	Away	1–0	27,515 (3,200)	Jordão	
22	8 December 2001	Sheffield United	Home	0–1	19,462 (1,105)		
23	12 December 2001	Coventry City	Home	1–0	22,543 (1,371)	Konjić (own goal)	
24	15 December 2001	Crewe Alexandra	Away	1–1	8,154 (2,176)	Jordão	
25	22 December 2001	Sheffield Wednesday	Home	1–1	20,340 (1,393)	Fox	
26	26 December 2001	Manchester City	Away	0–0	34,407 (2,100)		
27	29 December 2001	Gillingham	Away	1–2	9,912 (1,600)	Johnson	
28	1 January 2002	Stockport County	Home	4–0	20,541 (683)	Dichio (2), Roberts, Johnson	
29	12 January 2002	Grimsby Town	Away	0–0	6,011 (1,498)		
30	20 January 2002	Walsall	Home	1–0	20,290 (2,387)	Roberts	
31	29 January 2002	Birmingham City	Home	1–0	25,266 (5,049)	Roberts	
32	3 February 2002	Burnley	Away	2–0	15,846 (1,452)	Roberts (2)	
33	10 February 2002	Norwich City	Home	1–0	19,115 (542)	Dichio	
34	19 February 2002	Millwall	Away	0–1	13,716 (1,255)		
35	23 February 2002	Portsmouth	Home	5–0	21,028 (1,374)	Roberts (2), Sigurðsson, Dobie, Bališ	
36	26 February 2002	Preston North End	Away	0–1	14,487 (1,432)		
37	2 March 2002	Wimbledon	Away	1–0	8,363 (1,803)	Dichio	
38	5 March 2002	Watford	Home	1–1	19,580 (946)	Dichio	
39	16 March 2002	Sheffield United	Away	3–0	17,653 (2,646)	Dobie (2), McInnes	
40	22 March 2002	Nottingham Forest	Away	1–0	24,788 (5,000)	Taylor	
41	26 March 2002	Crewe Alexandra	Home	4–1	21,303 (544)	Jordão (2), Dichio, Wright (own goal)	
42	30 March 2002	Barnsley	Home	3–1	23,167 (1,253)	Jordão, Dichio, Benjamin	
43	1 April 2002	Coventry City	Away	1–0	21,513 (3,800)	Taylor	
44	7 April 2002	Rotherham United	Home	1–1	22,376 (703)	Taylor	
45	13 April 2002	Bradford City	Away	1–0	20,209 (3,500)	Bališ (pen)	
46	21 April 2002	Crystal Palace	Home	2–0	26,712 (1,896)	Moore, Taylor	

=== FA Cup ===
Round	Date	Opponent	Venue	Result	Attendance	Goalscorers	Notes
3	5 January 2002	Sunderland	Away	2–1	29,133 (5,300)	Clement (pen), Johnson	
4	26 January 2002	Leicester City	Home	1–0	26,820 (5,184)	Clement (pen)	
5	16 February 2002	Cheltenham Town	Home	1–0	27,179	Dichio	
6	10 March 2002	Fulham	Home	0–1	24,811		

=== League Cup ===
Round	Date	Opponent	Venue	Result	Attendance	Goalscorers	Notes
1	22 August 2001	Cambridge United	Away	1–1	3,363	Dobie	(after extra time; Albion won 4–3 on penalties)
2	11 September 2001	Swindon Town	Home	2–0	14,536 (643)	Dobie, Jordão	(after extra time)
3	9 October 2001	Charlton Athletic	Home	0–1	9,625		

== See also ==
- 2001–02 in English football
