= Gloucestershire Senior Cup =

Gloucestershire County FA Senior Cup
- Region: Gloucestershire
- Teams: 11 (2023/24)
- Current champions: Bristol Manor Farm
- Most championships: Cheltenham Town/ reserves (31 titles)
- Website: Gloucestershire County FA Official Website

The Senior Challenge Cup is the current county cup in the county of Gloucestershire. It is administered by the Gloucestershire County Football Association (GCFA). According to the current rules of the competition, it is open to all clubs whose first affiliation is with the GCFA. The current holders are [Forest Green Rovers].

== History ==
The Senior Cup and the Challenge Trophy are the only competitions competed across the whole county. Most other challenge cup competitions in the county are competed for by clubs according to their location in the county. County rules state that clubs that are south of Thornbury compete in the southern section and the rest of the county compete in the northern section. None of the affiliated clubs that compete above the fifth tier in the English football league system enter their first teams in the Senior Challenge Cup.

The natural predecessor to the current competition was the Gloucestershire FA Northern Senior Professional Cup, which for its early existence was an annual game held between Gloucester City and Cheltenham Town. Gradually, other local sides were introduced to the competition, but the final was still dominated by the founding two clubs, until Forest Green Rovers in the 1980s and the eventual joining of the Bristol-based clubs in the 1990s to form what we now recognize as the Gloucestershire Senior Cup.

In the early years the cup saw large crowd and great local interest. The largest crowd came at Longlevens where a crowd of 4,221 witnessed Gloucester City defeat Cheltenham Town on 26 April 1951. In recent years, popularity has dwindled with clubs being involved in more prestigious competitions and fielding weakened sides in the competition.

The final was traditionally held at one of the finalists stadiums, but in recent years the final has been played at a neutral in Almondsbury at Oakland Park, which is the headquarters of the Gloucestershire FA.

== Finals ==
12/09/1936	Cheltenham Town	3–2	Gloucester City	Cheltenham
				Stadium: Whaddon Road; Attendance: 1678; Referee: W.P.Harper

11/09/1937	Cheltenham Town	3–2	Gloucester City	Cheltenham
				Stadium: Whaddon Road; Referee: R.W.Griffin

10/09/1938	Cheltenham Town	2–0	Gloucester City	Gloucester
				Stadium: Longlevens; Attendance: 2500; Referee: J.Lowe

25/03/1940	Gloucester City	0–0	Cheltenham Town	Gloucester
				Stadium: Longlevens; Attendance: 1000; Referee: S.W.Strange

25/03/1940	Cheltenham Town	2–1	Gloucester City	Cheltenham
Replay				Stadium: Whaddon Road; Referee: S.W.Strange

26/12/1946	Cheltenham Town	3–1	Gloucester City	Gloucester
				Stadium: Longlevens; Attendance: 2000

13/09/1947	Cheltenham Town	0–0	Gloucester City	Cheltenham
				Stadium: Whaddon Road; Attendance: 3000; Referee: E.G.H.Tomlin

15/04/1948	Cheltenham Town	2–1	Gloucester City	Gloucester
Replay				Stadium: Longlevens; Attendance: 2556; Referee: E.G.H.Tomlin

11/11/1948	Gloucester City	1–1	Cheltenham Town	Gloucester
				Stadium: Longlevens; Attendance: 3000; Referee: W.J.H.Oakley

14/05/1949	Cheltenham Town	2–1	Gloucester City	Cheltenham
Replay				Stadium: Whaddon Road; Attendance: 3000; Referee: W.J.H.Oakley

06/05/1950	Cheltenham Town	1–1	Gloucester City	Cheltenham
				Stadium: Whaddon Road; Attendance: 4000; Referee: L.H.Cook

13/05/1950	Gloucester City	2–1 (a.e.t.)	Cheltenham Town	Gloucester
				Stadium: Longlevens; Attendance: 4115; Referee: L.H.Cook

26/04/1951	Gloucester City	2–0	Cheltenham Town	Gloucester
				Stadium: Longlevens; Attendance: 4221

24/04/1952	Cheltenham Town	1–0	Gloucester City	Cheltenham
				Stadium: Whaddon Road; Attendance: 1500

23/04/1953	Gloucester City	1–0	Cheltenham Town	Gloucester
				Stadium: Longlevens; Attendance: 1457

26/04/1954	Stonehouse	2–1	Gloucester City	Gloucester
				Stadium: Longlevens

04/05/1955	Gloucester City	2–1	Cheltenham Town	Cheltenham
				Stadium: Whaddon Road; Attendance: 2321

02/05/1956	Cheltenham Town	3–3	Gloucester City	Cheltenham
				Stadium: Whaddon Road

07/05/1956	Gloucester City	2–0	Cheltenham Town	Gloucester
Replay				Stadium: Longlevens; Attendance: 3000

04/03/1957	Cheltenham Town	1–0	Gloucester City	Gloucester
				Stadium: Longlevens; Attendance: 3000

24/04/1958	Gloucester City	4–0	Cinderford Town	Gloucester
				Stadium: Longlevens

26/04/1959	Cheltenham Town	2–1	Gloucester City	Cheltenham
				Stadium: Whaddon Road

27/04/1960	Cheltenham Town	1–0	Gloucester City	Cheltenham
				Stadium: Whaddon Road

04/05/1961	Cheltenham Town	3–1	Gloucester City	Gloucester
				Stadium: Longlevens

26/04/1962	Cheltenham Town	3–0	Gloucester City	Cheltenham
				Stadium: Whaddon Road; Attendance: 1420

16/03/1963	Cheltenham Town	3–0	Gloucester City	Gloucester
				Stadium: Longlevens; Attendance: 1500

18/01/1964	Cheltenham Town	4–1	Gloucester City	Cheltenham
				Stadium: Whaddon Road; Attendance: 1742; Referee: J.M.Rowley

12/04/1965	Cheltenham Town	5–1	Gloucester City	Gloucester
				Stadium: Horton Road; Attendance: 1800; Referee: E.C.Strangroom

07/05/1966	Gloucester City	2–0	Cheltenham Town	Gloucester
				Stadium: Horton Road; Attendance: 2200; Referee: D.S.Hutchinson

16/04/1967	Cheltenham Town	2–1	Gloucester City	Gloucester
				Stadium: Horton Road; Attendance: 2650

28/04/1968	Cheltenham Town	3–1	Cinderford Town	Cheltenham
				Stadium: Whaddon Road

08/05/1969	Gloucester City	2–0	Cheltenham Town	Gloucester
				Stadium: Horton Road; Attendance: 3559; Referee: D.L.Nelson

14/02/1970	Cheltenham Town	2–2	Gloucester City	Cheltenham
				Stadium: Whaddon Road; Attendance: 1109; Referee: B.T.Stevens

20/04/1970	Cheltenham Town	2–0	Gloucester City	Gloucester
Replay				Stadium: Horton Road; Attendance: 516

10/10/1970	Gloucester City	2–0	Cheltenham Town	Gloucester
				Stadium: Horton Road; Attendance: 503; Referee: J.Slatter

16/04/1972	Cheltenham Town	4–1	Gloucester City	Cheltenham
				Stadium: Whaddon Road; Attendance: 850

18/04/1973	Cheltenham Town	3–2	Gloucester City	Cheltenham
				Stadium: Whaddon Road; Attendance: 966

07/04/1974	Cheltenham Town	4–1	Gloucester City	Gloucester
				Stadium: Horton Road; Attendance: 410

27/04/1975	Gloucester City	2–0	Cheltenham Town	Cheltenham
				Stadium: Whaddon Road; Attendance: 521

24/04/1976	Cheltenham Town	2–0	Gloucester City	Gloucester
				Stadium: Horton Road; Attendance: 370

06/10/1976	Cheltenham Town	2–0 (a.e.t.)	Gloucester City	Cheltenham
				Stadium: Whaddon Road; Attendance: 360

04/05/1978	Cheltenham Town	2–1	Gloucester City	Gloucester
				Stadium: Horton Road; Attendance: 500; Referee: R.Logan

21/03/1979	Gloucester City	4–3 (a.e.t.)	Cheltenham Town	Cheltenham
				Stadium: Whaddon Road; Attendance: 259

25/03/1980	Gloucester City	3–2 (a.e.t.)	Cheltenham Town	Gloucester
				Stadium: Horton Road; Referee: R.Poole

08/04/1981	Cheltenham Town	3–2	Gloucester City	Cheltenham
				Stadium: Whaddon Road; Attendance: 431; Referee: R.L.Hamer

11/08/1981	Gloucester City	6–2	Cheltenham Town	Gloucester
				Stadium: Horton Road; Attendance: 608

14/03/1983	Gloucester City	3–1 (a.e.t.)	Cheltenham Town	Gloucester
				Stadium: Horton Road; Attendance: 700

30/04/1984	Gloucester City	4–0	Forest Green Rovers	Nailsworth
				Stadium: The Lawn; Attendance: 1000

29/04/1985	Forest Green Rovers	3–2 (a.e.t.)	Gloucester City	Gloucester
				Stadium: Horton Road; Attendance: 324; Referee: A.Gannon

28/04/1986	Forest Green Rovers	1–1 (5–4 p)	Cheltenham Town	Cheltenham
				Stadium: Whaddon Road

27/04/1987	Forest Green Rovers	3–2	Gloucester City	Gloucester
				Stadium: Meadow Park; Attendance: 362; Referee: M.J.Price

20/04/1988	Cheltenham Town	4–1	Forest Green Rovers	Cheltenham
				Stadium: Whaddon Road

1989	Cheltenham Town	3–0	Forest Green Rovers

03/04/1990	Cheltenham Town	2–0	Yate Town	Cheltenham
				Stadium: Whaddon Road

09/04/1991	Gloucester City	2–1	Cheltenham Town	Cheltenham
				Stadium: Whaddon Road; Attendance: 705; Referee: Clive R. Wilkes

07/04/1992	Cheltenham Town	4–2	Gloucester City	Cheltenham
				Stadium: Whaddon Road; Attendance: 458; Referee: S.Dunn

07/04/1993	Gloucester City	3–2	Yate Town	Yate
				Stadium: Lodge Road; Attendance: 266; Referee: Dave N. Campbell

12/04/1994	A.F.C Newport	1–0	Gloucester City	Gloucester
				Stadium: Meadow Park; Attendance: 410; Referee: Kevin J. Hawkes

1994-1995	Cheltenham Town	1–1 (5–4 p)	Yate Town

02/04/1996	Cheltenham Town	0–0 (3–1 p)	Gloucester City	Cheltenham
				Stadium: Whaddon Road; Attendance: 432

06/05/1997	Cheltenham Town	2–1	Gloucester City	Gloucester
				Stadium: Meadow Park; Attendance: 520; Referee: Clive R. Wilkes

1997-1998	Bristol City Res	2–1	Forest Green Rovers

04/05/1999	Cheltenham Town Res	3–0	Gloucester City	Gloucester
				Stadium: Meadow Park; Attendance: 904; Referee: Kevin J. Hawkes

1999-2000	Bristol City Res	1–0 (a.e.t.)	Bristol Rovers Res

2000-2001	Cinderford Town	1–0	Bristol City Res

2001-2002	Bristol City Res	6–0	Cirencester Town

2002-2003	Mangotsfield United	1–0	Bristol City Res

2003-2004	Bristol City Res	5–2	Bristol Rovers Res	Bristol

2004-2005	Yate Town	2–0	Bristol Rovers Res	Bristol
				Stadium: Memorial Stadium (Bristol)

2005-2006	Yate Town	2–0	Cheltenham Town Res	Yate
				Stadium: Lodge Road

05/09/2007	Cheltenham Town Res	2–1	Cinderford Town

17/04/2008	Bristol City Res	9–1	Cheltenham Town Res	Bristol
19:00 BST				Stadium: Ashton Gate Stadium; Referee: Andrew Newell

06/05/2009	Bristol City Res	5–1	Gloucester City	Bristol
19:30 BST	Štyvar 17', 26'; Akinde 38', 65'; Murray 48'	Report	Ballinger 71'	Stadium: Ashton Gate Stadium; Attendance: 702; Referee: Adrian Shilston

05/05/2010	Bristol City Res	2–0	Gloucester City	Bristol
19:30 BST				Stadium: Ashton Gate Stadium; Referee: Mark Russell

04/05/2011	Yate Town	3–2	Cheltenham Town Res	Yate
19:45 BST	Plummer 44'; Church 46'; Fawke 50' (o.g.)	Report	Dempsey 16' (o.g.); Hitchings 83'	Stadium: Lodge Road

26/04/2012	Bristol City Res	6–0	Bishop's Cleeve	Bristol
19:30 BST	Burns 2', 26'; Horgan 34'; Amadi-Holloway 65'; Reid 72'	Report		Stadium: Ashton Gate Stadium; Attendance: 229; Referee: Derek Eaton

02/05/2013	Mangotsfield United	4–0	Cinderford Town	Mangotsfield
19:30 BST	Duharty 5'; Marshall 52'; Lamb 62'; Monelle 89'	Report		Stadium: Cossham Street Stadium; Attendance: 135; Referee: Richard Morris

29/04/2014	Mangotsfield United	3–0	Bristol City Res	Almondsbury
19:30 BST	Sysum 30'; Egan 52'; Powell 78'	Report		Stadium: Oaklands Park; Referee: Brian Durie

28/04/2015	Cirencester Town	2–0	Shortwood United	Almondsbury
19:30 BST	Jones 13'; Parsons 88'	Report		Stadium: Oaklands Park; Attendance: 125; Referee: Tim Wood

09/05/2016	Forest Green Rovers	1–0	Bishop's Cleeve	Nailsworth
19:30 BST	Jeffrey	Report		Stadium: The New Lawn; Attendance: 264; Referee: Simon Turner

02/08/2017	Bristol City Res	4–2	Cirencester Town	Almondsbury
19:30 BST				Stadium: Oaklands Park; Referee: Michael Halford

30/07/2018	Bristol City U23	1–1 (7–6 p)	Gloucester City	Almondsbury
19:30	Rees		Hanks	Stadium: Oaklands Park; Attendance: 300; Referee: Andrew Sheppard
	Penalties
	Holden (penalty scored); Richards (penalty scored); Harrison (penalty scored); Janneh (penalty scored); Morton (penalty scored); Parsons (penalty scored); Smith (penalty scored)		(penalty scored) Seymour; (penalty scored) Hanks; (penalty scored) Parker; (penalty scored) Deaman; (penalty scored) Lawrence; (penalty scored) King; (penalty missed) Yates

29/03/2022	Yate Town	5–0	Cirencester Town	Almondsbury
19:30 BST	Tumelty 30'; Hopper 40'; Hall 46'; Rees 52'; Harding 76'			Stadium: Oaklands Park

23/04/2024	Gloucester City	2–2	Bishops Cleeve	Gloucester
19:45 BST				Stadium: New Meadow Park; Attendance: 456

== Performance by club ==
Note: 9 tournaments are missing

Club	Wins	Runners-up	Year Winners	Year Runner-up
Cheltenham Town/Reserves	35	18	1936, 1937, 1938, 1940, 1946, 1948, 1949, 1952, 1957, 1959, 1960, 1961, 1962, 1963, 1964, 1965, 1967, 1968, 1970, 1972, 1973, 1974, 1976, 1976, 1978, 1981, 1988, 1989, 1990, 1992, 1995, 1996, 1997, 1999, 2007	1950, 1951, 1953, 1955, 1956, 1966, 1969, 1970, 1975, 1979, 1980, 1981, 1983, 1986, 1991, 2006, 2008, 2011
Gloucester City	17	36	1950, 1951, 1953, 1955, 1956, 1958, 1966, 1969, 1970, 1975, 1979, 1980, 1981, 1983, 1984, 1991, 1993	1936, 1937, 1938, 1940, 1946, 1948, 1949, 1952, 1954, 1957, 1959, 1960, 1961, 1962, 1963, 1964, 1965, 1967, 1970, 1972, 1973, 1974, 1976, 1976, 1978, 1981, 1985, 1987, 1992, 1994, 1996, 1997, 1999, 2009, 2010, 2018
Bristol City Reserves/U23	10	3	1998, 2000, 2002, 2004, 2008, 2009, 2010, 2012, 2017, 2018	2001, 2003, 2014
Forest Green Rovers	4	4	1985, 1986, 1987, 2016	1984, 1988, 1989, 1998
Yate Town	4	2	2005, 2006, 2011, 2022	1993, 1995
Mangotsfield United	3		2003, 2013, 2014	
Cinderford Town	1	4	2001	1958, 1968, 2007, 2013
Cirencester Town	1	3	2015	2002, 2017, 2022
Stonehouse Town	1		1954	
A.F.C Newport	1		1994	
Bristol Rovers Reserves		3		2000, 2004, 2005
Bishop's Cleeve		2		2012, 2016
Shortwood United		1		2015

== Trivia ==
The 1950 final between Gloucester City and Cheltenham Town at Whaddon Road had ended in a 1-1 draw.

A replay was held and, a crowd of 4,115 flocked to Gloucester City's Longlevens ground to witness the match. After normal time, the match had finished 1-1 again and it had been decided to play two 15 minute periods of extra time.

When the score was still 1-1 after the extra time expired, the captains and referee agreed to play a further 20 minute period of extra time, and afterwards, a further 20 minutes as the score was still level - a total of 160 minutes of play.

When the winning goal was scored by Gloucester's Doug Hunt in the 159th minute, the crowd spilled onto the pitch in jubilation, and the match was immediately ended by the referee.
