= Barry Cogan (footballer) =

Irish footballer (born 1984)

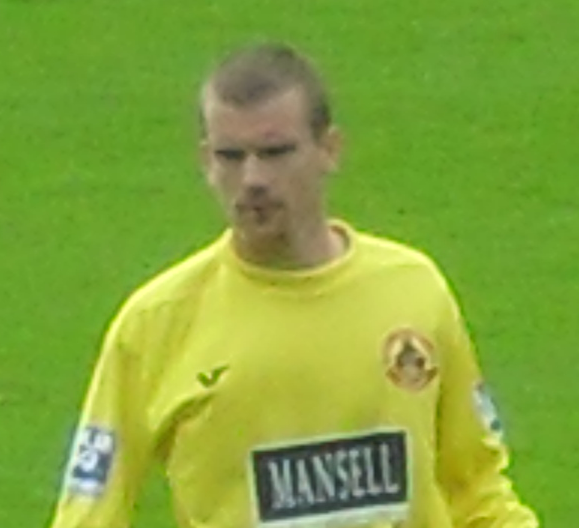
- Cogan playing for Crawley Town in 2009

Personal information
- Full name: Barry Christopher Cogan
- Date of birth: 4 November 1984 (age 41)
- Place of birth: Sligo, Ireland
- Position: Midfielder

Youth career
- Belvedere
- 1999–2001: Millwall

Senior career*
Years	Team	Apps	(Gls)
2001–2006	Millwall	24	(0)
2006–2007	Barnet	39	(3)
2007–2008	Gillingham	16	(1)
2008	→ Grays Athletic (loan)	13	(5)
2008–2009	Grays Athletic	43	(6)
2009–2010	Crawley Town	39	(3)
2010–2015	Dover Athletic	146	(28)
2015–2016	Dartford	26	(1)
2016	Leatherhead	6	(0)
2016–2017	Hastings United	20	(2)
2017–2019	Grays Athletic	40	(0)
Total		412	(49)

International career
2004	Republic of Ireland U21	1	(0)
- * Club domestic league appearances and goals

Barry Christopher Cogan (born 4 November 1984) is an Irish retired professional footballer who played as a midfielder.

He started his career with Boyle Celtic then joined Belvedere at under 15 before moving to Millwall, for whom he played as a substitute in the 2004 FA Cup Final, and making 24 appearances for in the Football League. In August 2006, Cogan signed for Barnet playing one season playing 39 appearances and scoring three goals in League Two, before being signed by Ronnie Jepson for Gillingham in June 2007. He was loaned to Grays Athletic in March 2008, scoring five goals in 13 Conference National appearances. Cogan signed for Grays permanently in July 2008 following his release from Gillingham. He then moved to Crawley Town in June 2009, after Steve Evans had tried to sign him the previous season. Cogan left Crawley in November 2010 by mutual consent, joining Dover Athletic a few days later.

== Career ==
=== Club career ===
==== Millwall ====
Born in Sligo, County Sligo, Cogan joined Millwall from Belvedere at 15 years of age, waiting four years, until 20 April 2004, before making his debut in a Championship game against Watford, replacing Peter Sweeney in the 80th minute. Cogan signed his professional contract in November 2004. Cogan remained at Millwall for two further seasons, making 30 appearances in all competitions, including playing in the 2004 FA Cup Final after coming on as a substitute, and two UEFA Cup games against Ferencvárosi TC.

==== Barnet ====
In August 2006, Cogan was signed by League Two club Barnet from Millwall for an undisclosed fee. He remained there for just one season before he was released by manager Paul Fairclough. He made over 40 appearances in all competitions, scoring three goals, all in matches won by Barnet.

==== Gillingham ====
Cogan joined Gillingham in June 2007, being tipped by new manager Ronnie Jepson to fill the void left by Matt Jarvis, who had joined Wolverhampton Wanderers. He made his debut for Gillingham in the 3–0 defeat at Watford in the League Cup on 14 August, and scored his first goal for the club in the 3–1 home victory over Leyton Orient on 2 October 2007. Following a string of bad results, Jepson resigned, and Mark Stimson was named as his permanent replacement in November 2007. Stimson saw Cogan as surplus to requirements, and offered him a chance to go out on loan in February 2008. He rejected this initial chance, but subsequently joined Grays Athletic for a month on 14 March 2008, scoring five goals in thirteen Conference National matches. Gillingham released Cogan at the end of the 2007–08 season, after he made just 21 appearances in all competitions.

==== Grays Athletic ====
In June 2008, Grays Athletic announced that Cogan had signed for the club, following a medical examination to test his fitness, on a trial basis. His first goal of the 2008–09 campaign came in the home win against Kidderminster Harriers on 7 September 2008, receiving a pass from Jamie Taylor on the right-wing to make the score 3–1. Cogan scored in the 47th minute of Grays' 1–1 draw against Woking on 18 October. In October 2008, Grays Athletic announced that players had been asked to take a 50% pay cut due to financial difficulties. During the FA Cup fourth round qualifying tie against AFC Totton, Cogan scored a penalty in the 85th minute after Phil Warner handled a cross from Ishmael Welsh. His next goal came almost two months later when he netted both goals in Grays' 2–1 victory over Barrow at the New Recreation Ground on 20 December. His first goal of the game came after Barrow's goalkeeper, Alan Martin, spilled a cross from Ishmael Welsh which Cogan pounced on from barely a yard out. In the 56th minute, Cogan had a shot from the edge of the penalty area after out muscling defenders Steve McNulty and Paul Jones. In Grays' next match against Canvey Island in the Essex Senior Cup on 23 December, Cogan scored a late penalty in the 90th minute to equalise the game 2–2 and send the game into extra time. Grays Athletic eventually lost 3–2 after extra time. The club released news that the players were again being paid in full and over the "Christmas period and for January". On 14 February 2009, Grays travelled to face Wrexham at the Racecourse Ground. He scored to equalise the game at 1–1 after the Wrexham goalkeeper struggled with George Beavan's initial shot whilst Cogan scored the rebound. He then set up Grays' second, crossing the ball to Andy Pugh, who scored a consolation goal as Grays lost 3–2. He then scored in Grays' 2–1 home victory over Altrincham on 7 March. Cogan finished the season as Grays' top goal scorer in all competitions.

==== Crawley Town ====
Crawley Town manager Steve Evans signed Cogan on 8 June following his release from Grays Athletic. Evans admitted he tried signing Cogan three times the previous season, but had his attempts rejected. Cogan had other offers, but Crawley assistant manager Paul Raynor stated that the club's South London location appealed to him. He made his debut for Crawley on 8 August, in the 4–0 away defeat to Mansfield Town, replacing Daniel Powell as a substitute in the 52nd minute. Having made only three appearances in the 2010–11 season, Cogan was released by mutual consent on 16 November 2010. Evans stated that Cogan wanted to "play some first team football".

==== Dover Athletic ====
Cogan signed for Dover Athletic a few days after leaving Crawley, making his debut coming on as a substitute for Sam Long in the 2–1 home defeat against Woking in the FA Trophy on 20 November.

==== Dartford ====
In July 2015, he signed for National League South side Dartford on a free transfer, following a successful trial with the club. He was released on 24 May 2016 following the end of the 2015–16 season having made 26 league appearances for the club scoring one goal against Bishop's Stortford in a 2–1 away victory on 24 October 2015.

==== Leatherhead, Hastings and returning to Grays ====
After spells with Leatherhead and Hastings United, Cogan returned to Grays on 7 June 2017.

=== International career ===
Cogan was called up to the Republic of Ireland under-21 squad for the Madeira International Tournament, where he made his under-21 debut against Madeira on 27 February 2004.

== Honours ==
Millwall

- FA Cup runner-up: 2003–04
