= Yate Town F.C. =

Association football club in England

Coordinates: 51°32′58″N 2°26′19″W

Yate Town
- Full name: Yate Town Football Club
- Nickname: The Bluebells
- Founded: 1906
- Ground: Lodge Road, Yate
- Capacity: 2,000 (236 seated)
- Chairman: Mark Thorne
- Manager: Darren Mullings
- League: Southern League Premier Division South
- 2025–26: Southern League Premier Division South, 13th of 22
| Home colours | Away colours |

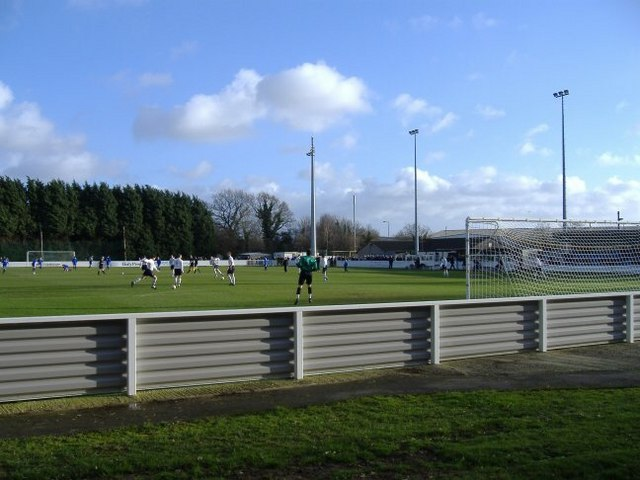
Players warming up before a match at the club's Lodge Road ground

Yate Town Football Club is a football club based in Yate, South Gloucestershire, England. They are currently members of the Southern League Premier Division South and play at Lodge Road.

== History ==
The club was established in 1906 under the name Yate Rovers. They won the Gloucestershire Junior Cup in 1913–14, but disbanded in the early 1930s. After reforming under the name Yate YMCA in 1933, they joined the Bristol & District League. The club were Division Five champions in 1947–48 and were promoted to Division Three. In 1954–55 they were Division Two runners-up, earning promotion to Division One. In the mid-1960s the club moved up to the Bristol Premier Combination.

In 1968 Yate were founder members of the Gloucestershire County League, and the following year they were renamed Yate Town. In 1983 the club transferred to Division One of the Hellenic League. They were Division One runners-up in 1984–85, earning promotion to the Premier Division. The club went on to win back-to-back Premier Division titles in 1987–88 and 1988–89, also winning the Gloucestershire Challenge Trophy in the latter season. Following their second league title, they moved up to the Southern Division of the Southern League.

After two seasons in the Southern Division Yate were transferred to the Midland Division, where the club played until returning to the Southern Division in 1994. In 1997–98 they finished bottom of the division, but were not relegated due to league restructuring. The division was renamed the Western Division in 1999, and the club finished bottom of the division in 1999–2000, resulting in relegation and a return to the Premier Division of the Hellenic League. In 2002–03 they were Premier Division runners-up, earning promotion back to the Southern League's Western Division.

In 2004–05 Yate were Western Division runners-up and were promoted to the Premier Division. They also won the Gloucestershire Senior Cup, an went on to retain the trophy the following season. The club remained in the Premier Division for four seasons, until being relegated to the renamed Division One South & West at the end of the 2008–09 season. They won the Senior Cup again in 2010–11. In 2012–13 the club reached the first round of the FA Cup for the first time, losing 3–0 at Cheltenham Town. Division One South & West was renamed the Division One West in 2017, and then Division One South the following year. A third-place finish in 2018–19 saw them qualify for the promotion play-offs. After beating Moneyfields on penalties in the semi-final, they defeated Cinderford Town 3–1 in the final to secure promotion to the Premier Division South.

The 2021–22 season saw Yate reach the first round of the FA Cup for the second time, losing 5–0 at home to Yeovil Town. They also won the Gloucestershire Senior Cup, defeating Cirencester Town 5–1 in the final. In 2022–23 they finished second-from-bottom of the Premier Division South and were relegated to Division One South. The club were Division One South champions in 2024–25, earning promotion back to the Premier Division South.

== Ground ==
The club played at Yate Aerodrome between 1954 and 1960, and then Sunnyside Lane from 1960 until 1984. They then moved to Lodge Road, where a 236-seat stand was built in 1987 and floodlights installed the following year.

== Current squad ==
As of 15 January 2026

Note: Flags indicate national team as defined under FIFA eligibility rules; some limited exceptions apply. Players may hold more than one non-FIFA nationality.

| Pos. | Nation | Player |
|---|---|---|
| GK | ENG | Aaron Sainsbury |
| DF | ENG | Dan Ball |
| DF | ENG | Dan Dempsey |
| DF | ENG | Lewis Hall |
| DF | ENG | Will Larvin |
| DF | ENG | James Taylor |
| MF | ENG | Matt Britton |
| MF | ENG | Dayle Grubb |

| Pos. | Nation | Player |
|---|---|---|
| MF | ENG | Joe Guest (captain) |
| MF | WAL | Lloyd James |
| MF | ENG | Rex Mannings |
| MF | ENG | Wayne Nderemani |
| FW | ENG | Marlon Jackson |
| FW | ENG | David Sims-Burgess |
| FW | ENG | Lucas Tomlinson |

== Coaching staff ==
- First Team Manager: Darren Mullings
- Assistant Manager: Paul Tovey
- Coach: Will Morford
- Physio: Ben Emery
- Kit Manager: James Hicks

== Honours ==
- Southern League
  - Division One South champions 2024–25
- Hellenic League
  - Premier Division champions 1987–88, 1988–89
- Bristol & District League
  - Division Five champions 1947–48
- Gloucestershire Senior Cup
  - Winners 2004–05, 2005–06, 2010–11, 2021–22
- Gloucestershire Challenge Trophy
  - Winners 1988–89
- Gloucestershire Junior Cup
  - Winners 1913–14

== Records ==
- Best FA Cup performance: First round, 2012–13, 2021–22
- Best FA Trophy performance: Third round, 2004–05
- Best FA Vase performance: Fifth round, 1991–92
- Biggest win: 13–3 vs Clevedon, Bristol Premier Combination, 1967–68
- Most appearances: Gary Hewlett
- Most goals: Kevin Thaws
- Record attendance: 2,000 vs Bristol Rovers XI, testimonial match, 1990
- Record transfer fee received: £15,000 from Bristol Rovers for Mike Davis
- Record transfer fee paid: £2,000 to Chippenham Town for Matt Rawlings, 2003

== See also ==
- Yate Town F.C. players
- Yate Town F.C. managers
