= 1992–93 Torquay United F.C. season =

Torquay United F.C.
1992–93 season
- Chairman: (England) Mike Bateson
- Manager: (England) Paul Compton (until March) (England) Neil Warnock (from March)
- Stadium: Plainmoor
- Third Division: 8th
- FA Cup: First round
- Football League Cup: Second round
- Football League Trophy: Second round
- Top goalscorer: Duane Darby (13)
Home colours

During the 1992–93 English football season, Torquay United F.C. competed in the Third Division. Torquay had in fact been relegated from the third division the previous season, but, due to rebranding of the leagues following the formation of the FA Premier League, the old Fourth Division had been renamed the third.

== Kit ==
Torquay retained the previous season's kit, manufactured by Matchwinner and sponsored by Mod-Dec Windows.

== Squad ==
Squad at end of season

Note: Flags indicate national team as defined under FIFA eligibility rules; some limited exceptions apply. Players may hold more than one non-FIFA nationality.

Pos.	Nation	Player
DF	ENG	Kevin Blackwell
DF	ENG	Chris Curran
DF	ENG	Darren Moore
DF	ENG	Wes Saunders
DF	SCO	Tom Kelly
MF	ENG	Sean William Joyce
MF	ENG	Chris Myers
MF	ENG	Paul Trollope

Pos.	Nation	Player
FW	ENG	Duane Darby
FW	ENG	Justin Fashanu
FW	ENG	Adrian Foster
FW	ENG	John Muir

=== Left club during season ===
Note: Flags indicate national team as defined under FIFA eligibility rules; some limited exceptions apply. Players may hold more than one non-FIFA nationality.

Pos.	Nation	Player
FW	ENG	Paul Hall (to Portsmouth)

== Transfers ==
=== In ===
- Tom Kelly - Exeter City, January, free

=== Out ===
- Paul Holmes - Birmingham City
- Paul Hall - Portsmouth, 25 March, £70,000

== Results ==
=== Third Division ===
Crewe Alexandra 4–2 Torquay United

Doncaster Rovers 2–3 Torquay United

York City 2–1 Torquay United

Torquay United 2–1 Cardiff City

Scarborough 1–0 Torquay United

Torquay United 1–1 Wrexham

Torquay United 1–0 Northampton Town

Bury 2–0 Torquay United

Darlington 4–1 Torquay United

Torquay United 2–2 Chesterfield

Hereford United 3–1 Torquay United

Torquay United 0–2 Carlisle United

Gillingham 0–2 Torquay United

Torquay United 0–2 Rochdale

Halifax Town 0–2 Torquay United

Torquay United 0–1 Scunthorpe United

Colchester United 2–0 Torquay United

Torquay United 1–0 Shrewsbury Town

Torquay United 0–1 Walsall

Barnet 5–4 Torquay United

Torquay United 1–3 Scarborough

Wrexham 4–2 Torquay United

Torquay United 0–1 Bury

Northampton Town 0–1 Torquay United

Torquay United 1–2 Doncaster Rovers

Torquay United 1–2 Crewe Alexandra

Cardiff City 4–0 Torquay United

Torquay United 1–0 York City

Chesterfield 1–0 Torquay United

Torquay United 0–2 Darlington

Lincoln City 2–2 Torquay United

Torquay United 2–0 Halifax Town

Rochdale 1–0 Torquay United

Scunthorpe United 2–2 Torquay United

Torquay United 2–2 Colchester United

Walsall 2–2 Torquay United

Torquay United 0–1 Barnet

Shrewsbury Town 0–1 Torquay United

Torquay United 1–2 Lincoln City

Torquay United 0–0 Hereford United

Carlisle United 0–1 Torquay United

Torquay United 2–1 Gillingham
