= Darren Mullings =

English footballer (born 1987)

Personal information
- Date of birth: 3 March 1987 (age 39)
- Place of birth: Bristol, England
- Position: Midfielder

Team information
- Current team: Yate Town (manager)

Youth career
- –2005: Bristol Rovers

Senior career*
Years	Team	Apps	(Gls)
2005–2007	Bristol Rovers	4	(0)
2006	→ Clevedon Town (loan)	8	(1)
2007–2008	Torquay United	6	(1)
2007–2008	→ Tiverton Town (loan)	10	(0)
2008–2010	Weston-super-Mare	64	(23)
2010–2014	Gloucester City	121	(28)
2014–2015	Oxford City	28	(1)
2015–2016	Paulton Rovers	40	(5)
2016	Weston-super-Mare	8	(0)
2016–2017	Gloucester City	25	(1)
2017–2018	Chippenham Town	20	(1)
2018–2022	Salisbury	127	(11)
2022–2023	Yate Town	28	(2)

Managerial career
- 2023–: Yate Town
- * Club domestic league appearances and goals

Darren Mullings (born 3 March 1987) is an English former professional footballer who played as a midfielder. He is currently manager of Yate Town.

== Career ==
A former England schoolboy under 18 international and England colleges under 19 international. After leaving South Gloucestershire and Stroud College, Mullings began his career as a trainee with Bristol Rovers, turning professional in July 2005. His league debut came on 31 December 2005 when he was a second-half substitute for Craig Disley in Rovers' 2–1 defeat at home to Wycombe Wanderers. He made three further league appearances, all as substitute, that season, but failed to feature in the 2006–07 season and was loaned to Clevedon Town in October 2006.

He was released by Rovers at the end of the 2006–07 season and joined Torquay United in June 2007. He scored on his Torquay debut, but was later sent off as Torquay won 5–4 away to Histon on 18 September 2007. He was loaned to Tiverton Town in November 2007 and was released by Torquay at the end of the season

Mullings joined Conference South side Weston-super-Mare on trial in July 2008, scoring on his debut in a 1–1 pre-season draw against Exeter City. He signed a contract with Weston in August 2008. He has now joined Conference North side Gloucester City and scored on his debut in a friendly against Bitton. In March 2014, Mullings jumped ship to fellow Conference North side Oxford City, citing financial reasons. After a few months at Weston-super-Mare, Mullings re-joined Gloucester City. After a season and a half back at the club, he left to join fellow National South side Chippenham Town in November 2017. In August 2018, Mullings joined Salisbury as the travelling and training demands at Salisbury suited him better with his commitments with Bristol City. In August 2020, Mullings was appointed as player-coach at Salisbury.In November 2022, Mullings joined Yate Town as a player-coach. Following a successful period as caretaker manager, he was appointed as the club's manager in November 2023 . In this season, he led the team to an eighth-place finish. Mullings guided Yate Town back to Step 3 of the English football league system, leading them to the 2024/2025 Southern League Division One South Title.
