= Danny Wring =

English footballer

Personal information
- Full name: Daniel Wring
- Date of birth: 26 October 1986 (age 40)
- Position: Midfielder

Team information
- Current team: Larkhall Athletic

Youth career
- –2004: Bristol City

Senior career*
Years	Team	Apps	(Gls)
2004–2007	Bristol City	1	(0)
2007–2008	Torquay United	6	(0)
2008	Team Bath		
2008	Newport County		
2008	Mangotsfield United		
2008–2010	Clevedon Town		
2010–2013	Chippenham Town		
2013–2014	Bath City	2	(0)
2014–2015	Bideford		
2015–	Weston-super-Mare	16	(0)
- * Club domestic league appearances and goals as of 22 May 2016

Daniel Wring (born 26 October 1986) is an English former professional footballer who plays for Larkhall Athletic. He is a midfielder.

Wring began his career as a trainee with Bristol City. He made his league debut, while still a trainee, as a late substitute for Joe Anyinsah on 7 May 2005 in City's 3–2 win away to Sheffield Wednesday. He turned professional in April 2006, but failed to add to his single first team appearance for City and was released at the end of the 2006–07 season.

Wring joined Torquay United in June 2007, making his Conference National debut as a second-half substitute for Danny Stevens in Torquay's 3–1 win away to Northwich Victoria on 18 August 2007. He played just six times for Torquay, all as a substitute, and left the club by mutual consent on 31 January 2008. He joined Team Bath and was a regular member of their side that won promotion to the Conference South.

In the 2008 close season he had trials with Worcester City, Weston-super-Mare and Newport County, eventually signing for Newport. However, he left in August 2008 to join Mangotsfield United, leaving them in December 2008 to join local rivals Clevedon Town. In 2010, he signed for Chippenham Town F.C. After spells at Bath City and Bideford, he signed for Weston-super-Mare for the 2015–16 season.
