= Renewal Christian Centre =

Church in Solihull, England

Renewal Christian Centre is a large family church established and primarily based in Solihull, England. The church belongs to the Free Methodist Church of Great Britain.

The congregation was founded in 1972 and has grown to over 800 weekly attendees.

The church also operates and has additional facilities throughout the West Midlands, with gatherings also taking place in Stratford-Upon-Avon and Chelmsley Wood.

== Facilities ==
The church's main base is in Solihull, West Midlands, but it also operates and has facilities in Stratford-Upon-Avon and Chelmsley Wood.

=== Solihull ===
The church holds gatherings on a Sunday at 10am and 6pm. It runs many community activities throughout the week, as well as having large children's and youth ministries. The Renewal Community Hub was opened in 2008 and has facilities for a range of community activities.

=== Stratford-Upon-Avon ===
The church holds one gathering on a Sunday at 10am and meets at Bridgetown Primary School.

=== Chelmsley Wood ===
The church was given a permanent building on Walnut Close, Chelmsley Wood. This building was eventually knocked down and rebuilt into a brand new family centre, opening its doors in October 2016. The church holds one gathering on a Sunday at 11am. It also offers a coffee shop and facilities for a range of community activities throughout the week.
