= Ishmael Welsh =

English footballer

Personal information
- Full name: Ishmael Welsh-Elliott
- Date of birth: 4 September 1987 (age 39)
- Place of birth: Deptford, England
- Height: 5 ft 7 in (1.70 m)
- Position: Midfielder

Team information
- Current team: Cray Wanderers

Youth career
- ?–2005: West Ham United

Senior career*
Years	Team	Apps	(Gls)
2005–2006	West Ham United	0	(0)
2006–2008	Yeovil Town	21	(1)
2007	→ Weymouth (loan)	9	(0)
2007–2008	→ Torquay United (loan)	21	(2)
2008	→ Forest Green Rovers (loan)	16	(0)
2008–2009	Grays Athletic	40	(3)
2009–2010	Ebbsfleet United	30	(0)
2010–2011	Grays Athletic	11	(0)
2011–2012	Lewes	17	(0)
2012–2013	Chelmsford City	19	(0)
2013	Bromley	14	(0)
2014–	Cray Wanderers	13	(0)

International career^{‡}
2009–	England C	2	(0)
- * Club domestic league appearances and goals as of 12:00, 1 December 2014 (UTC) ‡ National team caps and goals as of 17:44, 20 May 2009 (UTC)

Ishmael Welsh-Elliott (born 4 September 1987) is an English professional footballer who plays as a winger for Cray Wanderers.

== Career ==
Welsh began his career as a trainee with West Ham United, turning professional in July 2005. He failed to break into the first team with West Ham and was released in May 2006. In July that year he signed a two-year contract with Yeovil Town and scored on his league debut on 12 August 2006 in Yeovil's 2–1 win at home to Carlisle United.

Despite being in Yeovil's first team at the start of the season, Welsh struggled to establish himself and was allowed to join Weymouth on loan in March 2007. He returned to Yeovil before the end of the season, playing in the final league game of the season away to Gillingham, but failed to make the squad for any of Yeovil's play-off matches.

In August 2007, Welsh joined Torquay United on a season-long loan. On 11 November Torquay met Yeovil in the first round of the FA Cup and Yeovil demanded that Torquay not include Welsh in the team to face them otherwise they would recall the midfielder back from his loan spell in January. Despite Yeovil's warning Torquay included him on the bench for the match but he was not brought on during the game as Torquay came away with a 4–1 win. After his spell at Torquay he returned to Yeovil, but was then quickly loaned back out, this time to Jim Harvey's Forest Green Rovers for the remainder of the 2007–08 season.

On 7 May 2008, Grays Athletic announced that Welsh had signed for the Essex outfit. In August 2010, Welsh left Ebbsfleet, having spent the previous season with them.

Welsh rejoined Isthmian League Division One North club Grays Athletic in August 2010.

In January 2011, Welsh signed up with his old manager, Tim O'Shea at Lewes in the Conference South.

In February 2012, Welsh joined Chelmsford City. Welsh was released by the Clarets on 5 February 2013 and promptly joined league rivals Bromley. He made his debut in a 1–1 home draw with Boreham Wood on 16 February. He left the club at the end of the season following the expiry of his contract.

After taking a season out from football, Welsh signed for Cray Wanderers ahead of the 2014–15 season.

Now retired he works at preston park primary as a coach.

== Honours ==
=== Club ===
Bromley
- London Senior Cup (1): 2012–13
