= Les Thompson (footballer, born 1988) =

English footballer

Personal information
- Full name: Leslie Allotey Thompson
- Date of birth: 3 October 1988 (age 38)
- Place of birth: Newham, England
- Height: 5 ft 10 in (1.78 m)
- Positions: Winger; defender

Team information
- Current team: Thurrock

Youth career
- 2002–2005: Arsenal
- 2005–2007: Bolton Wanderers

Senior career*
Years	Team	Apps	(Gls)
2007–2008	Bolton Wanderers	0	(0)
2007	→ Stockport County (loan)	6	(0)
2008	→ Torquay United (loan)	2	(0)
2009–2010	Thurrock	13	(1)
2010–2011	Concord Rangers	15	(2)
2011–2012	AFC Hornchurch	17	(2)
2012	Maidstone United	3	(0)
2013–201?	Maidenhead United	17	(0)
201?–2014	Redbridge	30	(8)
2014–2015	Thamesmead Town	35	(13)
2015–	Thurrock	19	(5)
- * Club domestic league appearances and goals as of 23:07, 4 May 2015 (UTC)

Leslie Allotey "Les" Thompson (born 3 October 1988) is an English footballer from Newham, London, who plays as a winger for Thurrock.

== Biography ==
Thompson began his career at Arsenal before signing as a trainee with Bolton Wanderers, having previously played for junior side Newham Warriors. He turned professional in July 2007. He joined Stockport County on loan in October 2007, and made his league debut for Stockport on 6 October in their 4–2 defeat at home to Barnet. He also played in the Football League Trophy win at Macclesfield Town, the league defeat at Darlington, and the league win away to Milton Keynes Dons, before returning to Bolton at the end of his one-month loan.

He joined Conference National side Torquay United on loan in January 2008, along with Bolton teammate Mark Ellis. His Torquay debut came in the FA Trophy, as a substitute for Elliott Benyon as Torquay won 2–1 away to Newport County on 12 January. A week later he again came on as a substitute for Benyon, as Torquay drew 0–0 away to Salisbury City in the Conference. He did not appear again for Torquay and returned to Bolton later that January.

He was released by Bolton at the end of the 2007–08 season, and had a trial with Gillingham in July 2008, playing in their friendly defeat against Birmingham City. He joined Yeovil Town on trial the following month, scoring for their reserve side in a 6–0 victory over Salisbury City's reserves. Thompson signed for Conference South club Thurrock on 1 September 2009.

Thompson left Thurrock in 2010 and signed for Isthmian League Premier Division side Concord Rangers. He spent a year with Concord before signing for fellow Essex club AFC Hornchurch, and was part of the squad that led the Urchins to promotion to the Conference South. Thompson left Hornchurch in the summer of 2012 and joined Maidstone United on 30 August 2012. He made three competitive appearances.

He signed for Maidenhead United on 1 November 2013. He re-signed for Thurrock in January 2015.
