= 1999–2000 Burnley F.C. season =

English football club season

Burnley
1999–2000 season
- Chairman: Barry Kilby
- Manager: Stan Ternent
- Second Division: 2nd (promoted)
- FA Cup: Fourth round
- League Cup: First round
- Football League Trophy: First round
- Top goalscorer: League: Andy Payton (27); All: Andy Payton (27)
- Highest home attendance: 22,310 v Preston North End (4 March 2000)
- Lowest home attendance: 3,647 v Manchester City (24 August 2000)
- Average home league attendance: 12,937

The 1999–2000 season was Burnley's 5th season in the third tier of English football. They were managed by Stan Ternent in his second full season since he replaced Chris Waddle at the beginning 1998–99 campaign.

Burnley won promotion at Scunthorpe United on the final day of the season, reaching 2nd place for the first time that season and pipping Gillingham who had looked certain for automatic promotion down the final stretch. Selling their 2,500 ticket allocation at Glanford Park, there were also 7,000 Clarets watching from the Longside Stand at Turf Moor as the game was beamed back onto a big screen in the centre of the pitch.

== Appearances and goals ==
No.	Pos	Nat	Player	Total		Second Division		League Cup		FA Cup		FL Trophy	
No.	Pos	Nat	Player	Apps	Goals	Apps	Goals	Apps	Goals	Apps	Goals	Apps	Goals
1	GK	(England) ENG	Paul Crichton	53	0	46+0	0	2+0	0	4+0	0	1+0	0
2	DF	(England) ENG	Dean West	41	0	30+4	0	1+1	0	4+0	0	1+0	0
3	DF	(England) ENG	Mitchell Thomas	51	0	44+0	0	2+0	0	4+0	0	1+0	0
4	MF	(Scotland) SCO	Micky Mellon	48	3	33+9	3	2+0	0	4+0	0	0+0	0
5	DF	(England) ENG	Steve Davis	48	7	42+0	7	1+0	0	4+0	0	1+0	0
6	DF	(England) ENG	Gordon Armstrong	27	1	22+0	1	1+0	0	3+1	0	0+0	0
7	MF	(England) ENG	Glen Little	48	3	36+5	3	2+0	0	4+0	0	1+0	0
8	MF	(England) ENG	Paul Cook	49	5	43+0	3	1+0	0	4+0	2	1+0	0
9	FW	(England) ENG	Andy Cooke	41	8	34+3	7	0+0	0	4+0	1	0+0	0
10	FW	(England) ENG	Andy Payton	47	27	39+2	27	1+0	0	4+0	0	1+0	0
11	MF	(England) ENG	Lenny Johnrose	39	2	28+7	2	2+0	0	0+1	0	1+0	0
12	FW	(England) ENG	Ronnie Jepson	36	2	1+30	2	0+2	0	0+3	0	0+0	0
13	GK	(England) ENG	Craig Mawson	0	0	0+0	0	0+0	0	0+0	0	0+0	0
14	DF	(England) ENG	Chris Brass	9	0	4+3	0	1+0	0	0+0	0	0+1	0
15	FW	(England) ENG	Graham Branch	50	3	31+13	3	2+0	0	0+3	0	1+0	0
16	DF	(Scotland) SCO	Tom Cowan	11	0	5+3	0	2+0	0	0+0	0	0+1	0
17	MF	(England) ENG	Paul Smith	24	0	17+6	0	0+0	0	1+0	0	0+0	0
18	MF	(England) ENG	Paul Weller	8	1	1+6	1	0+0	0	0+0	0	1+0	0
19	MF	(Australia) AUS	Mark Robertson	3	0	0+1	0	1+0	0	0+0	0	0+1	0
20	MF	(England) ENG	Brad Maylett	0	0	0+0	0	0+0	0	0+0	0	0+0	0
21	DF	(England) ENG	Chris Scott	0	0	0+0	0	0+0	0	0+0	0	0+0	0
22	DF	(England) ENG	John Williamson	0	0	0+0	0	0+0	0	0+0	0	0+0	0
23	DF	(England) ENG	Matthew Heywood	0	0	0+0	0	0+0	0	0+0	0	0+0	0
24	DF	(England) ENG	Michael Devenney	0	0	0+0	0	0+0	0	0+0	0	0+0	0
25	FW	(Republic of Ireland) IRL	Stephen Grant	2	0	0+0	0	0+0	0	0+2	0	0+0	0
26	MF	(England) ENG	Alex Kevan	0	0	0+0	0	0+0	0	0+0	0	0+0	0
27	MF	(England) ENG	Eamonn Kelly	0	0	0+0	0	0+0	0	0+0	0	0+0	0
28	DF	(England) ENG	Peter Swan	2	0	0+2	0	0+0	0	0+0	0	0+0	0
29	FW	(Republic of Ireland) IRL	Alan Lee	20	1	2+13	0	1+1	0	0+2	0	1+0	1
30	MF	(England) ENG	John Mullin	42	6	27+10	5	0+0	0	4+0	1	1+0	0
31	FW	(England) ENG	Anthony Shandran	0	0	0+0	0	0+0	0	0+0	0	0+0	0
32	DF	(Trinidad and Tobago) TRI	Ian Cox	17	1	17+0	1	0+0	0	0+0	0	0+0	0
33	FW	(England) ENG	Ian Wright	15	4	4+11	4	0+0	0	0+0	0	0+0	0
34	DF	(England) ENG	Gerry Harrison (on loan)	0	0	0+0	0	0+0	0	0+0	0	0+0	0

== Transfers ==
=== In ===
#	Pos	Player	From	Fee	Date
3	DF	(England) Mitchell Thomas	Luton Town	Free	1 July 1999
8	MF	(England) Paul Cook	Stockport County	Free	1 July 1999
2	DF	(England) Dean West	Bury	Free	1 July 1999
29	FW	(Republic of Ireland) Alan Lee	Aston Villa	£200k	7 July 1999
30	MF	(England) John Mullin	Sunderland	Free	13 July 1999
33	DF	(Trinidad and Tobago) Ian Cox	Bournemouth	£500k	4 February 2000
33	FW	(England) Ian Wright	Celtic	Free	14 February 2000
34	FW	(England) Gerry Harrison	Sunderland	Loan	23 March 2000

=== Out ===
#	Pos	Player	To	Fee	Date
	FW	(England) Colin Carr-Lawton	Berwick Rangers	Free	14 May 1999
	MF	(England) Mark Ford	Lommel	Free	14 May 1999
	DF	(England) Neil Moore	Macclesfield Town	Free	14 May 1999
	DF	(England) Gareth West		Released	14 May 1999
	MF	(England) Paul Graham		Released	14 May 1999
	DF	(England) Carl Smith	Worksop Town	Free	14 May 1999
	DF	(England) Ally Pickering	Altrincham	Free	14 May 1999
	GK	(Norway) Frank Petter-Kval	Løv-Ham	Free	14 May 1999
	DF	(Scotland) Brian Reid	Dunfermline	Free	8 June 1999
	FW	(England) Kevin Henderson	Hartlepool United	Free	11 June 1999
	DF	(England) Mark Winstanley	Shrewsbury Town	Free	1 July 1999
	DF	(England) Steve Morgan	Hull City	Free	1 July 1999
	FW	(England) Phil Eastwood	Morecambe	Free	29 July 1999
25	FW	(Republic of Ireland) Stephen Grant	Finn Harps	Free	1 September 1999
	DF	(Norway) Rune Vindheim	Hartlepool United	Free	16 September 1999
16	DF	(Scotland) Tom Cowan	Cambridge United	Loan	22 February 2000
28	DF	(England) Peter Swan	York City	Free	1 March 2000
19	MF	(Australia) Mark Robertson	Wollongong Wolves	Loan	13 March 2000

== Matches ==
=== Second Division ===
7 August 1999
3:00 p.m.

Wycombe Wanderers	1–1	Burnley
McSporran 27'	(Report)	Cooke 68'

Adams Park, High Wycombe
Attendance: 6,119 (1,419 away)
Referee: L Cable

14 August 1999
3:00 p.m.

Burnley	2–1	Chesterfield
Payton 31' (pen.); Johnrose 33'	(Report)

Turf Moor, Burnley
Attendance: 10,615
Referee: M Dean

21 August 1999
3:00 p.m.

Oldham Athletic	0–1	Burnley
	(Report)	Payton 31'

Boundary Park, Oldham
Attendance: 8,543 (3,571 away)
Referee: C Foy

21 August 1999
3:00 p.m.

Burnley	1–0	Stoke City
Payton 75'	(Report)

Turf Moor, Burnley
Attendance: 11,328
Referee: T Heilbron

30 August 1999
3:00 p.m.

Bristol Rovers	1–0	Burnley
Cureton 37' (pen.)	(Report)

Memorial Stadium, Bristol
Attendance: 7,624 (879 away)
Referee: K Hill

3 September 1999
7:45 p.m.

Burnley	2–1	Bournemouth
Branch 38'; Davis 62'	(Report)	Stein 39'

Turf Moor, Burnley
Attendance: 10,223
Referee: S Baines

11 September 1999
3:00 p.m.

Preston North End	0–0	Burnley
	(Report)

Deepdale, Preston
Attendance: 13,078 (3,869 away)
Referee: P Danson

23 September 2000
3:00 p.m.

Burnley	3–0	Colchester United
Payton 9' 38' (pen.) 51'	(Report)

Turf Moor, Burnley
Attendance: 10,090
Referee: P Robinson

25 September 1999
3:00 p.m.

Bristol City	0–0	Burnley
	(Report)

Ashton Gate, Bristol
Attendance: 11,510 (1,341 away)
Referee: M Jones

2 October 1999
3:00 p.m.

Burnley	2–2	Brentford
Payton 23'; Cook 31'	(Report)	Partridge 54'; Evans 80'

Turf Moor, Burnley
Attendance: 10,907
Referee: G Frankland

10 October 1999
1:00 p.m.

Burnley	1–2	Scunthorpe United
Payton 59'	(Report)	Ipoua 25' 85'

Turf Moor, Burnley
Attendance: 10,752
Referee: G Laws

16 October 1999
3:00 p.m.

Millwall	1–1	Burnley
Cahill 70'	(Report)	Cooke 12'

The New Den, Millwall
Attendance: 8,601 (1,005 away)
Referee: S Tomlin

19 October 1999
7:45 p.m.

Cambridge United	0–1	Burnley
	(Report)	Cooke 6'

Abbey Stadium, Cambridge
Attendance: 4,320 (791 away)
Referee: J Kirkby

23 October 1999
3:00 p.m.

Burnley	2–0	Bristol City
Cook 6'; Cooke 61'	(Report)

Turf Moor, Burnley
Attendance: 10,175
Referee: D Laws

2 November 1999
7:45 p.m.

Burnley	5–0	Wrexham
Mullin 43' 70'; Mellon 46'; Little 49'; Branch 82'	(Report)

Turf Moor, Burnley
Attendance: 8,994
Referee: R Furnandiz

6 November 1999
3:00 p.m.

Luton Town	2–1	Burnley
Midgley 49' 69'	(Report)	Cooke 50'

Kenilworth Road, Luton
Attendance: 7,205 (1,392 away)
Referee: F Stretton

14 November 1999
1:00 p.m.

Burnley	1–0	Blackpool
Mellon 77'	(Report)

Turf Moor, Burnley
Attendance: 12,898
Referee: A Butler

24 November 1999
7:45 p.m.

Reading	0–0	Burnley
	(Report)

Madejski Stadium, Reading
Attendance: 6,149 (1,064 away)
Referee: K Lynch

27 November 1999
3:00 p.m.

Wigan Athletic	1–1	Burnley
Haworth 41'	(Report)	Payton 17'

JJB Stadium, Wigan
Attendance: 11,986 (6,546 away)
Referee: T Jones

4 December 1999
3:00 p.m.

Burnley	1–0	Wycombe Wanderers
Payton 78'	(Report)

Turf Moor, Burnley
Attendance: 9,149
Referee: P Joslin

18 December 1999
3:00 p.m.

Burnley	2–1	Cardiff City
Armstrong 34'; Johnrose 68'	(Report)	Thomas 15' (o.g.)

Turf Moor, Burnley
Attendance: 9,753
Referee: P Jones

26 December 1999
3:00 p.m.

Bury	4–2	Burnley
Preece 7' 11' (pen.); Barrass 32'; Littlejohn 41'	(Report)	Jepson 90'; Mullin 90'

Gigg Lane, Bury
Attendance: 9,115 (5,100 away)
Referee: S Mathieson

28 December 1999
3:00 p.m.

Burnley	3–2	Oxford United
Payton 22' (pen.) 80' 89'	(Report)	Anthrobus 3'; Whelan 52'

Turf Moor, Burnley
Attendance: 14,218
Referee: P Taylor

3 January 2000
3:00 p.m.

Notts County	2–0	Burnley
Angell 14' 62'	(Report)

Meadow Lane, Nottingham
Attendance: 8,229 (2,812 away)
Referee: C Foy

15 January 2000
3:00 p.m.

Chesterfield	1–1	Burnley
Williams 73'	(Report)	Payton 4'

Saltergate, Chesterfield
Attendance: 4,214 (1,100 away)
Referee: A Wilkie

22 January 2000
3:00 p.m.

Burnley	3–0	Oldham Athletic
Cooke 24'; Payton 62' 80'	(Report)

Turf Moor, Burnley
Attendance: 12,391
Referee: S Lodge

29 January 2000
3:00 p.m.

Stoke City	2–2	Burnley
Thorne 68'; Payton 71' (o.g.)	(Report)	Payton 76' (pen.) 83'

Britannia Stadium, Stoke-on-Trent
Attendance: 15,354 (2,918 away)
Referee: M Fletcher

5 February 2000
3:00 p.m.

Burnley	1–0	Bristol Rovers
Little 69'	(Report)

Turf Moor, Burnley
Attendance: 13,526
Referee: N Barry

12 February 2000
3:00 p.m.

Bournemouth	0–1	Burnley
	(Report)	Payton 32'

Dean Court, Bournemouth
Attendance: 5,084 (1,300 away)
Referee: D Elleray

19 February 2000
3:00 p.m.

Burnley	0–0	Wigan Athletic
	(Report)

Turf Moor, Burnley
Attendance: 20,435 (2,200 away)
Referee: M Dean

26 February 2000
3:00 p.m.

Colchester United	1–2	Burnley
McGavin 19'	(Report)	Davis 17' 38'

Layer Road, Colchester
Attendance: 6,194 (1,016 away)
Referee: R Styles

4 March 2000
3:00 p.m.

Burnley	0–3	Preston North End
	(Report)	Jackson 2'; Macken 72'; Edwards 77'

Turf Moor, Burnley
Attendance: 22,310 (4,265 away)
Referee: J Kirkby

7 March 2000
3:00 p.m.

Burnley	0–2	Luton Town
	(Report)	White 26'; Gray 55'

Turf Moor, Burnley
Attendance: 12,080 (321 away)
Referee: P Danson

11 March 2000
3:00 p.m.

Wrexham	0–1	Burnley
	(Report)	Payton 6'

Racecourse Ground, Wrexham
Attendance: 6,582 (3,500 away)
Referee: B Burns

14 March 2000
7:45 p.m.

Gillingham	2–2	Burnley
Butters 4'; Asaba 68'	(Report)	Payton 31'; Wright 86'

Priestfield, Gillingham
Attendance: 7,347 (700 away)
Referee: G Barber

18 March 2000
3:00 p.m.

Burnley	3–0	Reading
Davis 37'; Payton 52'; Wright 84'	(Report)

Turf Moor, Burnley
Attendance: 14,436 (445 away)
Referee: R Furnandiz

21 March 2000
7:45 p.m.

Blackpool	1–1	Burnley
Gill 42'	(Report)	Branch 72'

Bloomfield Road, Blackpool
Attendance: 8,029 (3,400 away)
Referee: K Leach

25 March 2000
3:00 p.m.

Burnley	2–2	Bury
Payton 50'; Jepson 90'	(Report)	Swailes 77'; Daws 88'

Turf Moor, Burnley
Attendance: 13,297 (1,013 away)
Referee: P Rejer

1 April 2000
3:00 p.m.

Cardiff City	1–2	Burnley
Cox 67' (o.g.)	(Report)	Davis 21'; Payton 61'

Ninian Park, Cardiff
Attendance: 6,487 (1,000 away)
Referee: M Halsey

8 April 2000
3:00 p.m.

Burnley	2–1	Notts County
Payton 5'; Wright 90'	(Report)	Stallard 86'

Turf Moor, Burnley
Attendance: 13,022
Referee: T Heilbron

15 April 2000
3:06 p.m.

Oxford United	1–2	Burnley
Murphy 13'	(Report)	Davis 85'; Weller 90'

Manor Ground, Oxford
Attendance: 7,549 (2,121 away)
Referee: B Knight

18 April 2000
7:45 p.m.

Burnley	0–3	Gillingham
	(Report)	Gooden 21'; Ashby 50'; Smith 70'

Turf Moor, Burnley
Attendance: 17,026
Referee: M Messias

22 April 2000
3:00 p.m.

Burnley	4–3	Millwall
Cox 6'; Cooke 28'; Davis 43'; Cook 52'	(Report)	Harris 59' 77'; Cahill 87'

Turf Moor, Burnley
Attendance: 14,890
Referee: J Winter

24 April 2000
3:00 p.m.

Brentford	2–3	Burnley
Owusu 43'; Marshall 90'	(Report)	Mullin 61' 76'; Wright 64'

Griffin Park, Brentford
Attendance: 6,595 (1,600 away)
Referee: G Poll

29 April 2000
3:00 p.m.

Burnley	2–0	Cambridge United
Payton 13' 31'	(Report)

Turf Moor, Burnley
Attendance: 15,084
Referee: M Warren

6 May 2000
3:00 p.m.

Scunthorpe United	1–2	Burnley
Hodges 21'	(Report)	Mellon 41'; Little 73'

Glanford Park, Scunthorpe
Attendance: 5,862 (2,500 away)
Referee: A Butler

=== Final league position ===
Pos	Team	Pld	W	D	L	GF	GA	GD	Pts	Promotion or relegation
1	Preston North End (C, P)	46	28	11	7	74	37	+37	95	Promotion to the First Division
2	Burnley (P)	46	25	13	8	69	47	+22	88	Promotion to the First Division
3	Gillingham (O, P)	46	25	10	11	79	48	+31	85	Qualification for the Second Division play-offs
4	Wigan Athletic	46	22	17	7	72	38	+34	83	Qualification for the Second Division play-offs
5	Millwall	46	23	13	10	76	50	+26	82	Qualification for the Second Division play-offs

Rules for classification: 1) Points; 2) Goal difference; 3) Goals scored
(C) Champions; (O) Play-off winners; (P) Promoted

=== League Cup ===
==== 1st Round First leg ====
11 August 1999
7:45 p.m.

Manchester City	5–0	Burnley
Goater 36'; Kennedy 48' 82'; Horlock 62' (pen.); Taylor 74'	(Report)

Maine Road, Manchester
Attendance: 11,074 (1,256 away)
Referee: M Pike

==== 1st Round Second leg ====
24 August 1999
7:45 p.m.

Burnley	0–1	Manchester City
	(Report)	Cooke 65'

Turf Moor, Burnley
Attendance: 3,647
Referee: D Pugh

=== FA Cup ===
==== 1st round ====
31 October 1999
1:30 p.m.

Barnet	0–1	Burnley
	(Report)	Cook 74'

Underhill Stadium, London
Attendance: 2,563 (600 away)
Referee: R Styles

==== 2nd round ====
20 November 1999
3:00 p.m.

Burnley	2–0	Rotherham United
Cook 67'; Mullin 75'	(Report)

Turf Moor, Burnley
Attendance: 8,110
Referee: G Laws

==== 3rd round ====
11 December 1999
3:00 p.m.

Derby County	0–1	Burnley
	(Report)	Cooke 62'

Pride Park Stadium, Derby
Attendance: 23,400 (5,000 away)
Referee: M Riley

==== 4th round ====
8 January 2000
3:00 p.m.

Coventry City	3–0	Burnley
Chippo 11' 69'; Whelan 75'	(Report)

Highfield Road, Coventry
Attendance: 22,774 (4,000 away)
Referee: S Lodge

=== Football League Trophy ===
==== Northern Section 1st Round ====
7 December 1999
7:45 p.m.

Wigan Athletic	2–1 (a.e.t.)	Burnley
Bradshaw 39' (pen.); Morris 105'	(Report)	Lee 26'

JJB Stadium, Wigan
Attendance: 2,085
Referee: G Cain
