= 1998–99 Burnley F.C. season =

English football club season

Burnley
1998–99 season
- Chairman: Frank Teasdale
- Manager: Stan Ternent
- Second Division: 15th
- FA Cup: First round
- League Cup: First round
- Football League Trophy: First round
- Top goalscorer: League: Andy Payton (20); All: Andy Payton (23)
- Highest home attendance: 17,251 v Manchester City (9 March 1999)
- Lowest home attendance: 5,453 v Bury (18 August 1998)
- Average home league attendance: 10,604
Home colours

The 1998–99 season was Burnley's 4th successive season in the third tier of English football. They were managed by Stan Ternent in his first full season since he replaced Chris Waddle at the beginning of the campaign.

== Appearances and goals ==
| No. | Pos | Nat | Player | Total | | Second Division | | League Cup | | FA Cup | | FL Trophy | |
| No. | Pos | Nat | Player | Apps | Goals | Apps | Goals | Apps | Goals | Apps | Goals | Apps | Goals |
|---|---|---|---|---|---|---|---|---|---|---|---|---|---|
| | DF | (England) ENG | Gordon Armstrong | 40 | 1 | 40+0 | 1 | 0+0 | 0 | 0+0 | 0 | 0+0 | 0 |
| | DF | (England) ENG | Steve Blatherwick | 5 | 0 | 3+0 | 0 | 2+0 | 0 | 0+0 | 0 | 0+0 | 0 |
| | FW | (England) ENG | Graham Branch | 20 | 1 | 14+6 | 1 | 0+0 | 0 | 0+0 | 0 | 0+0 | 0 |
| | DF | (England) ENG | Chris Brass | 38 | 0 | 33+1 | 0 | 2+0 | 0 | 1+0 | 0 | 1+0 | 0 |
| | FW | (England) ENG | Colin Carr-Lawton | 7 | 0 | 2+2 | 0 | 2+0 | 0 | 0+0 | 0 | 1+0 | 0 |
| | MF | (England) ENG | Paul Cook (on loan) | 12 | 1 | 12+0 | 1 | 0+0 | 0 | 0+0 | 0 | 0+0 | 0 |
| | FW | (England) ENG | Andy Cooke | 38 | 10 | 36+0 | 9 | 1+0 | 1 | 0+0 | 0 | 1+0 | 0 |
| | DF | (Scotland) SCO | Tom Cowan (on loan) | 1 | 0 | 1+0 | 0 | 0+0 | 0 | 0+0 | 0 | 0+0 | 0 |
| | DF | (Scotland) SCO | Tom Cowan | 11 | 0 | 11+0 | 0 | 0+0 | 0 | 0+0 | 0 | 0+0 | 0 |
| | GK | (England) ENG | Paul Crichton (on loan) | 1 | 0 | 1+0 | 0 | 0+0 | 0 | 0+0 | 0 | 0+0 | 0 |
| | GK | (England) ENG | Paul Crichton | 29 | 0 | 28+0 | 0 | 0+0 | 0 | 0+0 | 0 | 1+0 | 0 |
| | DF | (England) ENG | Steve Davis | 19 | 4 | 19+0 | 4 | 0+0 | 0 | 0+0 | 0 | 0+0 | 0 |
| | DF | (England) ENG | Michael Devenney | 1 | 0 | 0+0 | 0 | 0+0 | 0 | 0+0 | 0 | 1+0 | 0 |
| | FW | (England) ENG | Phil Eastwood | 15 | 1 | 6+7 | 1 | 0+0 | 0 | 1+0 | 0 | 1+0 | 0 |
| | MF | (England) ENG | Mark Ford | 14 | 0 | 11+1 | 0 | 0+0 | 0 | 1+0 | 0 | 0+1 | 0 |
| | MF | (England) ENG | Paul Graham | 0 | 0 | 0+0 | 0 | 0+0 | 0 | 0+0 | 0 | 0+0 | 0 |
| | FW | (England) ENG | Kevin Henderson | 10 | 1 | 0+7 | 1 | 0+2 | 0 | 0+0 | 0 | 0+1 | 0 |
| | MF | (England) ENG | Matthew Hewlett (on loan) | 3 | 0 | 2+0 | 0 | 0+0 | 0 | 0+0 | 0 | 1+0 | 0 |
| | DF | (England) ENG | Matthew Heywood | 15 | 0 | 11+2 | 0 | 0+0 | 0 | 1+0 | 0 | 1+0 | 0 |
| | DF | (England) ENG | Lee Howey | 5 | 0 | 3+0 | 0 | 2+0 | 0 | 0+0 | 0 | 0+0 | 0 |
| | FW | (England) ENG | Ronnie Jepson | 17 | 1 | 3+12 | 1 | 2+0 | 0 | 0+0 | 0 | 0+0 | 0 |
| | MF | (England) ENG | Lenny Johnrose | 12 | 1 | 9+3 | 1 | 0+0 | 0 | 0+0 | 0 | 0+0 | 0 |
| | GK | (Norway) NOR | Frank-Petter Kval | 1 | 0 | 0+0 | 0 | 0+0 | 0 | 1+0 | 0 | 0+0 | 0 |
| | MF | (England) ENG | Glen Little | 37 | 5 | 32+2 | 5 | 2+0 | 0 | 1+0 | 0 | 0+0 | 0 |
| | GK | (England) ENG | Craig Mawson | 0 | 0 | 0+0 | 0 | 0+0 | 0 | 0+0 | 0 | 0+0 | 0 |
| | MF | (England) ENG | Brad Maylett | 18 | 0 | 0+17 | 0 | 0+0 | 0 | 0+0 | 0 | 1+0 | 0 |
| | MF | (Scotland) SCO | Micky Mellon | 20 | 2 | 20+0 | 2 | 0+0 | 0 | 0+0 | 0 | 0+0 | 0 |
| | DF | (England) ENG | Neil Moore | 14 | 0 | 10+2 | 0 | 1+1 | 0 | 0+0 | 0 | 0+0 | 0 |
| | DF | (England) ENG | Steve Morgan | 20 | 0 | 17+0 | 0 | 2+0 | 0 | 1+0 | 0 | 0+0 | 0 |
| | DF | (England) ENG | John O'Kane (on loan) | 8 | 0 | 8+0 | 0 | 0+0 | 0 | 0+0 | 0 | 0+0 | 0 |
| | GK | (England) ENG | Tony Parks | 0 | 0 | 0+0 | 0 | 0+0 | 0 | 0+0 | 0 | 0+0 | 0 |
| | FW | (England) ENG | Andy Payton | 42 | 23 | 39+1 | 20 | 1+0 | 1 | 1+0 | 2 | 0+0 | 0 |
| | DF | (England) ENG | Ally Pickering | 21 | 1 | 21+0 | 1 | 0+0 | 0 | 0+0 | 0 | 0+0 | 0 |
| | DF | (Scotland) SCO | Brian Reid | 33 | 3 | 30+1 | 3 | 0+0 | 0 | 1+0 | 0 | 1+0 | 0 |
| | MF | (Australia) AUS | Mark Robertson | 1 | 0 | 1+0 | 0 | 0+0 | 0 | 0+0 | 0 | 0+0 | 0 |
| | DF | (England) ENG | Chris Scott | 15 | 0 | 9+5 | 0 | 0+0 | 0 | 1+0 | 0 | 0+0 | 0 |
| | MF | (England) ENG | Paul Smith | 14 | 0 | 11+1 | 0 | 2+0 | 0 | 0+0 | 0 | 0+0 | 0 |
| | DF | (England) ENG | Carl Smith | 11 | 0 | 5+5 | 0 | 1+0 | 0 | 0+0 | 0 | 0+0 | 0 |
| | DF | (England) ENG | Peter Swan | 17 | 0 | 11+6 | 0 | 0+0 | 0 | 0+0 | 0 | 0+0 | 0 |
| | DF | (Norway) NOR | Rune Vindheim | 10 | 2 | 8+0 | 2 | 0+0 | 0 | 1+0 | 0 | 1+0 | 0 |
| | GK | (England) ENG | Gavin Ward (on loan) | 17 | 0 | 17+0 | 0 | 0+0 | 0 | 0+0 | 0 | 0+0 | 0 |
| | MF | (England) ENG | Paul Weller | 2 | 0 | 1+0 | 0 | 1+0 | 0 | 0+0 | 0 | 0+0 | 0 |
| | FW | (England) ENG | Mike Williams | 3 | 0 | 2+0 | 0 | 1+0 | 0 | 0+0 | 0 | 0+0 | 0 |
| | DF | (England) ENG | John Williamson | 1 | 0 | 0+1 | 0 | 0+0 | 0 | 0+0 | 0 | 0+0 | 0 |
| | FW | (England) ENG | Mark Winstanley | 1 | 0 | 1+0 | 0 | 0+0 | 0 | 0+0 | 0 | 0+0 | 0 |

== Transfers ==
=== In ===
| # | Pos | Player | From | Fee | Date |
|---|---|---|---|---|---|
| | FW | (England) Ronnie Jepson | Oldham Athletic | Free | 1 July 1998 |
| | GK | (England) Paul Crichton | West Bromwich Albion | Loan | 7 August 1998 |
| | GK | (England) Paul Crichton | West Bromwich Albion | Loan | 12 August 1998 |
| | GK | (England) Gavin Ward | Bolton Wanderers | Loan | 15 August 1998 |
| | DF | (England) Gordon Armstrong | Bury | £40k | 28 August 1998 |
| | DF | (England) Peter Swan | Bury | Free | 28 August 1998 |
| | DF | (England) John O'Kane | Everton | Loan | 23 October 1998 |
| | GK | (England) Paul Crichton | West Bromwich Albion | £100k | 18 November 1998 |
| | MF | (England) Matthew Hewlett | Bristol City | Loan | 26 November 1998 |
| | DF | (England) Ally Pickering | Stoke City | Free | 17 December 1998 |
| | DF | (England) Steve Davis | Luton Town | £750k | 30 December 1998 |
| | FW | (England) Graham Branch | Stockport County | Free | 1 January 1999 |
| | MF | (Scotland) Micky Mellon | Tranmere Rovers | £350k | 8 January 1999 |
| | MF | (England) Lenny Johnrose | Bury | £225k | 12 February 1999 |
| | MF | (England) Paul Cook | Stockport County | Loan | 12 March 1999 |
| | DF | (Scotland) Tom Cowan | Huddersfield Town | Loan | 12 March 1999 |
| | DF | (Scotland) Tom Cowan | Huddersfield Town | £20k | 16 March 1999 |

=== Out ===
| # | Pos | Player | To | Fee | Date |
|---|---|---|---|---|---|
| | FW | (England) Ian Duerden | Halifax Town | Free | 31 May 1998 |
| | MF | (England) Chris Waddle | Torquay United | Free | 31 May 1998 |
| | FW | (England) Ian Helliwell | Ilkeston Town | Free | 31 May 1998 |
| | FW | (England) Nigel Gleghorn | Altrincham | Free | 31 May 1998 |
| | DF | (England) Jason Heffernan | | Released | 31 May 1998 |
| | DF | (England) Vince Overson | Halifax Town | Free | 31 May 1998 |
| | DF | (England) Chris Vinnicombe | Wycombe Wanderers | Free | 31 May 1998 |
| | FW | (England) Damian Matthew | Northampton Town | Free | 1 June 1998 |
| | GK | (England) Chris Woods | | Retired | 3 July 1998 |
| | MF | (England) Jamie Hoyland | Scarborough | Free | 3 July 1998 |
| | DF | (England) Richard Huxford | Dunfermline Athletic | Free | 3 July 1998 |
| | MF | (England) Gerry Harrison | Sunderland | Free | 7 July 1998 |
| | GK | (England) Tony Parks | Doncaster Rovers | Free | 31 August 1998 |
| | DF | (England) Steve Blatherwick | Chesterfield | Loan | 18 September 1998 |
| | DF | (England) Mark Winstanley | Shrewsbury Town | Loan | 18 September 1998 |
| | DF | (England) Lee Howey | Northampton Town | Loan | 6 November 1998 |
| | DF | (England) Steve Blatherwick | Chesterfield | £50k | 1 December 1998 |
| | DF | (England) Mark Winstanley | Scunthorpe United | Loan | 24 December 1998 |
| | FW | (England) Phil Eastwood | Kettering Town | Loan | 11 February 1999 |
| | DF | (England) Lee Howey | Northampton Town | £50k | 19 February 1999 |
| | DF | (England) Mark Winstanley | Preston North End | Loan | 22 March 1999 |
| | FW | (England) Mike Williams | Oxford United | Free | 22 March 1999 |

== Matches ==
=== Second Division ===
8 August 1998

| Burnley | 2–1 | Bristol Rovers |
|---|---|---|
| Payton 2', 31' | (Report) | Cureton 8' |

Turf Moor, Burnley
Attendance: 11,781
Referee: J Kirkby

15 August 1998

| Chesterfield | 1–0 | Burnley |
|---|---|---|
| Reeves 89' (pen.) | (Report) |

Saltergate, Chesterfield
Attendance: 5,426
Referee: M Jones

22 August 1998

| Burnley | 0–1 | York City |
|---|---|---|
| | (Report) | Connelly 32' |

Turf Moor, Burnley
Attendance: 9,715
Referee: A Bates

29 August 1998

| Walsall | 3–1 | Burnley |
|---|---|---|
| Brissett 34'; Wrack 88', 90' (pen.) | (Report) | Armstrong 69' |

Bescot Stadium, Walsall
Attendance: 4,599
Referee: M Dean

1 September 1998

| Burnley | 2–1 | Millwall |
|---|---|---|
| Cooke 21', 30' | (Report) | Shaw 88' |

Turf Moor, Burnley
Attendance: 8,526
Referee: D Pugh

5 September 1998

| Luton Town | 1–0 | Burnley |
|---|---|---|
| Douglas 47' | (Report) |

Kenilworth Road, Luton
Attendance: 5,554
Referee: K Leach

9 September 1998

| Reading | 1–1 | Burnley |
|---|---|---|
| Williams 28' | (Report) | Payton 76' |

Madejski Stadium, Reading
Attendance: 10,080
Referee: P Danson

12 September 1998

| Burnley | 1–1 | Wycombe Wanderers |
|---|---|---|
| Payton 6' | (Report) | Stallard 37' |

Turf Moor, Burnley
Attendance: 9,120
Referee: M Pike

19 September 1998

| Gillingham | 2–1 | Burnley |
|---|---|---|
| Galloway 11'; Taylor 86' | (Report) | Payton 31' |

Priestfield, Gillingham
Attendance: 5,702
Referee: A Butler

26 September 1998

| Burnley | 1–1 | Wigan Athletic |
|---|---|---|
| Reid 68' | (Report) | McGibbon 90' |

Turf Moor, Burnley
Attendance: 10,183
Referee: G Frankland

3 October 1998

| Manchester City | 2–2 | Burnley |
|---|---|---|
| Goater 8'; Allsopp 85' | (Report) | Payton 34'; Cooke 54' |

Maine Road, Manchester
Attendance: 30,722 (3,132 away)
Referee: R Furnandiz

9 October 1998

| Colchester United | 0–4 | Burnley |
|---|---|---|
| | (Report) | Payton 2', 11'; Vindheim 50'; Cooke 72' |

Layer Road, Colchester
Attendance: 5,532
Referee: D Crick

17 October 1998

| Burnley | 1–1 | Notts County |
|---|---|---|
| Vindheim 90' | (Report) | Pearce 8' |

Turf Moor, Burnley
Attendance: 10,559
Referee: M Warren

20 October 1998

| Burnley | 1–0 | Oldham Athletic |
|---|---|---|
| Cooke 64' | (Report) |

Turf Moor, Burnley
Attendance: 9,539
Referee: G Frankland

24 October 1998

| Macclesfield Town | 2–1 | Burnley |
|---|---|---|
| Sedgemore 18'; Smith 84' | (Report) | Little 71' |

Moss Rose, Burnley
Attendance: 3,995
Referee: A Hall

31 October 1998

| Burnley | 2–1 | Wrexham |
|---|---|---|
| Payton 29', 55' | (Report) | Ridler 46' |

Turf Moor, Burnley
Attendance: 10,109
Referee: M Fletcher

7 November 1998

| Preston North End | 4–1 | Burnley |
|---|---|---|
| Rankine 23'; Nogan 46'; Eyres 49'; Byfield 57' | (Report) | Eastwood 15' |

Deepdale, Preston
Attendance: 15,888
Referee: E Lomas

10 November 1998

| Burnley | 0–2 | Stoke City |
|---|---|---|
| | (Report) | Lightbourne 47'; Thorne 62' |

Turf Moor, Burnley
Attendance: 10,575
Referee: G Laws

21 November 1998

| Bournemouth | 5–0 | Burnley |
|---|---|---|
| Warren 55'; Robinson 60' (pen.), 69'; Stein 74', 89' | (Report) |

Dean Court, Bournemouth
Attendance: 5,907
Referee: J Brandwood

28 November 1998

| Burnley | 1–0 | Blackpool |
|---|---|---|
| Payton 67' (pen.) | (Report) |

Turf Moor, Burnley
Attendance: 11,925
Referee: P Rejer

12 December 1998

| Fulham | 4–0 | Burnley |
|---|---|---|
| Morgan 27', 38'; Hayles 57'; Peschisolido 73' | (Report) |

Craven Cottage, London
Attendance: 9,983
Referee: R Olivier

19 December 1998

| Burnley | 0–2 | Northampton Town |
|---|---|---|
| | (Report) | Wilkinson 71'; Corazzin 81' |

Turf Moor, Burnley
Attendance: 8,783
Referee: A Hall

26 December 1998

| York City | 3–3 | Burnley |
|---|---|---|
| Hall 54'; Rowe 61', 72' | (Report) | Payton 23', 87'; Robertson 58' |

Bootham Crescent, York
Attendance: 5,630
Referee: S Mathieson

28 December 1998

| Burnley | 1–1 | Lincoln City |
|---|---|---|
| Henderson 81' | (Report) | Finnigan 72' |

Turf Moor, Burnley
Attendance: 9,635
Referee: P Dowd

2 January 1999

| Burnley | 0–0 | Walsall |
|---|---|---|
| | (Report) |

Turf Moor, Burnley
Attendance: 10,892
Referee: T Jones

9 January 1999

| Bristol Rovers | 3–4 | Burnley |
|---|---|---|
| Cureton 24'; Roberts 35'; Lee 45' | (Report) | Davis 15'; Branch 30'; Payton 44'; Cooke 54' |

Memorial Stadium, Bristol
Attendance: 7,129
Referee: A Wiley

16 January 1999

| Burnley | 1–2 | Chesterfield |
|---|---|---|
| Cooke 86' | (Report) | Pickering 30' (o.g.); Beaumont 65' |

Turf Moor, Burnley
Attendance: 10,985
Referee: S Mathieson

23 January 1999

| Millwall | 1–2 | Burnley |
|---|---|---|
| Sadlier 86' | (Report) | Cooke 11'; Davis 80' |

The New Den, London
Attendance: 7,407
Referee: M Fletcher

30 January 1999

| Lincoln City | 1–1 | Burnley |
|---|---|---|
| Gordon 32' | (Report) | Reid 66' |

Sincil Bank, Lincoln
Attendance: 6,361
Referee: B Burns

6 February 1999

| Burnley | 1–2 | Luton Town |
|---|---|---|
| Mellon 29' | (Report) | Fotiadis 34'; Doherty 87' |

Turf Moor, Burnley
Attendance: 10,285
Referee: P Walton

13 February 1999

| Burnley | 1–1 | Reading |
|---|---|---|
| Reid 9' | (Report) | Caskey 54' |

Turf Moor, Burnley
Attendance: 9,366
Referee: K Lynch

20 February 1999

| Wycombe Wanderers | 2–0 | Burnley |
|---|---|---|
| Simpson 51'; Scott 52' | (Report) |

Adams Park, Wycombe
Attendance: 5,195
Referee: B Coddington

27 February 1999

| Burnley | 0–5 | Gillingham |
|---|---|---|
| | (Report) | Taylor 14', 27', 41', 43' (pen.), 48' |

Turf Moor, Burnley
Attendance: 8,981
Referee: T Heilbron

9 March 1999

| Burnley | 0–6 | Manchester City |
|---|---|---|
| | (Report) | Horlock 17'; Morrison 41'; Goater 50', 59', 65'; Allsopp 82' |

Turf Moor, Burnley
Attendance: 17,251
Referee: J Kirkby

14 March 1999

| Burnley | 0–1 | Preston North End |
|---|---|---|
| | (Report) | Nogan 61' |

Turf Moor, Burnley
Attendance: 11,561
Referee: C Wilkes

20 March 1999

| Wrexham | 1–1 | Burnley |
|---|---|---|
| Brammer 14' | (Report) | Mellon 75' |

Racecourse Ground, Wrexham
Attendance: 4,151
Referee: M Warren

28 March 1999

| Burnley | 4–3 | Macclesfield Town |
|---|---|---|
| Little 17'; Davis 57', 90'; Payton 79' | (Report) | Durkan 9', 63'; Askey 14' |

Turf Moor, Burnley
Attendance: 10,500
Referee: D Laws

3 April 1999

| Notts County | 0–0 | Burnley |
|---|---|---|
| | (Report) |

Meadow Lane, Nottingham
Attendance: 6,625
Referee: A D'Urso

5 April 1999

| Burnley | 3–1 | Colchester United |
|---|---|---|
| Johnrose 57'; Payton 82', 89' | (Report) | Gregory 26' |

Turf Moor, Burnley
Attendance: 10,747
Referee: G Cain

10 April 1999

| Oldham Athletic | 1–1 | Burnley |
|---|---|---|
| Tipton 37' | (Report) | Payton 52' |

Boundary Park, Oldham
Attendance: 8,542
Referee: R Pearson

13 April 1999

| Blackpool | 0–2 | Burnley |
|---|---|---|
| | (Report) | Payton 26'; Little 57' |

Bloomfield Road, Blackpool
Attendance: 5,658
Referee: K Leach

17 April 1999

| Burnley | 0–0 | Bournemouth |
|---|---|---|
| | (Report) |

Turf Moor, Burnley
Attendance: 9,802
Referee: E Lomas

24 April 1999

| Stoke City | 1–4 | Burnley |
|---|---|---|
| Crowe 31' | (Report) | Pickering 5'; Payton 11'; Little 68', 90' |

Britannia Stadium, Stoke-on-Trent
Attendance: 10,965
Referee: D Crick

1 May 1999

| Burnley | 1–0 | Fulham |
|---|---|---|
| Jepson 82' | (Report) |

Turf Moor, Burnley
Attendance: 13,086
Referee: P Rejer

3 May 1999

| Wigan Athletic | 0–0 | Burnley |
|---|---|---|
| | (Report) |

Springfield Park, Wigan
Attendance: 5,528
Referee: B Burns

8 May 1999

| Northampton Town | 2–2 | Burnley |
|---|---|---|
| Savage 7'; Howey 80' | (Report) | Cook 69' (pen.); Cooke 88' |

Sixfields Stadium, Northampton
Attendance: 7,435
Referee: A Butler

=== Final league position ===
| Pos | Team | Pld | W | D | L | GF | GA | GD | Pts |
|---|---|---|---|---|---|---|---|---|---|
| 13 | Bristol Rovers | 46 | 13 | 17 | 16 | 65 | 56 | +9 | 56 |
| 14 | Blackpool | 46 | 14 | 14 | 18 | 44 | 54 | −10 | 56 |
| 15 | Burnley | 46 | 13 | 16 | 17 | 54 | 73 | −19 | 55 |
| 16 | Notts County | 46 | 14 | 12 | 20 | 52 | 61 | −9 | 54 |
| 17 | Wrexham | 46 | 13 | 14 | 19 | 43 | 62 | −19 | 53 |

Rules for classification: 1) Points; 2) Goals scored; 3) Goal difference

=== League Cup ===
==== 1st round first leg ====
11 August 1998

| Bury | 1–1 | Burnley |
|---|---|---|
| Matthews 17' | (Report) | Cooke 29' |

Gigg Lane, Bury
Attendance: 3,927
Referee: G Cain

==== 1st round second leg ====
18 August 1998

| Burnley | 1–4 | Bury |
|---|---|---|
| Payton 42' | (Report) | D'Jaffo 45'; Daws 51'; Armstrong 70'; Matthews 78' |

Turf Moor, Burnley
Attendance: 5,453
Referee: C Foy

=== FA Cup ===
==== 1st round ====
17 November 1998

| Darlington | 3–2 | Burnley |
|---|---|---|
| Atkinson 81'; Dorner 87'; Barnard 90' | (Report) | Payton 37', 55' (pen.) |

Riverside Stadium, Middlesbrough
Attendance: 5,059
Referee: B Coddington

=== Football League Trophy ===
==== Northern Section 1st round ====
8 December 1998

| Burnley | 0–1 | Preston North End |
|---|---|---|
| | (Report) | Macken 57' |

Turf Moor, Burnley
Attendance: 3,366
Referee: D Pugh
