= 1997–98 Burnley F.C. season =

English football club season

Burnley
1997–98 season
- Chairman: Frank Teasdale
- Manager: Chris Waddle
- Second Division: 20th
- FA Cup: First round
- League Cup: Second round
- Football League Trophy: Northern section final
- Top goalscorer: League: Andy Cooke (16); All: Andy Cooke (20)
- Highest home attendance: 18,811 v Plymouth Argyle (2 May 1998)
- Lowest home attendance: 2,442 v Notts County (27 January 1998)
- Average home league attendance: 10,481
Home colours

The 1997–98 season was Burnley's 3rd successive season in the third tier of English football. They were managed by Chris Waddle in his only full season since he replaced Adrian Heath at the beginning of the campaign.

== Appearances and goals ==
No.	Pos	Nat	Player	Total		Second Division		League Cup		FA Cup		FL Trophy	
No.	Pos	Nat	Player	Apps	Goals	Apps	Goals	Apps	Goals	Apps	Goals	Apps	Goals
	FW	(England) ENG	Paul Barnes	30	6	24+1	6	3+0	0	2+0	0	0+0	0
	GK	(England) ENG	Marlon Beresford	43	0	34+0	0	4+0	0	2+0	0	3+0	0
	DF	(England) ENG	Steve Blatherwick	28	0	13+7	0	3+0	0	1+1	0	3+0	0
	DF	(England) ENG	Chris Brass	49	1	37+3	1	3+0	0	2+0	0	3+1	0
	FW	(England) ENG	Colin Carr-Lawton	1	0	0+1	0	0+0	0	0+0	0	0+0	0
	FW	(England) ENG	Andy Cooke	43	20	26+8	16	2+0	1	2+0	1	5+0	2
	MF	(England) ENG	Gordon Cowans	9	0	5+1	0	1+0	0	2+0	0	0+0	0
	FW	(Scotland) SCO	Gerry Creaney (on loan)	11	8	9+1	8	1+0	0	0+0	0	0+0	0
	FW	(England) ENG	Ian Duerden	1	0	1+0	0	0+0	0	0+0	0	0+0	0
	FW	(England) ENG	Phil Eastwood	3	0	1+2	0	0+0	0	0+0	0	0+0	0
	MF	(England) ENG	David Eyres	17	2	13+0	1	4+0	1	0+0	0	0+0	0
	MF	(England) ENG	Mark Ford	44	1	32+4	1	2+0	0	0+1	0	4+1	0
	DF	(Netherlands) NED	Marco Gentile	1	0	0+0	0	1+0	0	0+0	0	0+0	0
	FW	(England) ENG	Nigel Gleghorn	1	0	1+0	0	0+0	0	0+0	0	0+0	0
	MF	(England) ENG	Gerry Harrison	40	0	33+2	0	0+0	0	0+2	0	3+0	0
	FW	(England) ENG	Kevin Henderson	10	2	0+7	1	0+0	0	0+0	0	0+3	1
	DF	(England) ENG	Lee Howey	29	1	21+2	0	3+0	1	2+0	0	0+1	0
	MF	(England) ENG	Jamie Hoyland	12	0	2+6	0	0+0	0	1+0	0	2+1	0
	DF	(England) ENG	Richard Huxford	7	0	4+0	0	2+1	0	0+0	0	0+0	0
	FW	(England) ENG	Andy Kiwomya (on loan)	3	0	1+2	0	0+0	0	0+0	0	0+0	0
	MF	(England) ENG	Glen Little	29	5	19+5	4	0+2	0	0+0	0	3+0	1
	MF	(England) ENG	Damian Matthew	33	1	21+6	1	3+1	0	0+0	0	2+0	0
	DF	(England) ENG	Neil Moore	48	4	38+2	3	2+0	0	2+0	1	4+0	0
	MF	(England) ENG	John Mullin (on loan)	6	0	6+0	0	0+0	0	0+0	0	0+0	0
	GK	(England) ENG	Tony Parks	0	0	0+0	0	0+0	0	0+0	0	0+0	0
	FW	(England) ENG	Andy Payton	24	12	19+0	9	0+0	0	0+0	0	5+0	3
	MF	(England) ENG	Paul Smith	19	0	8+7	0	0+0	0	0+1	0	3+0	0
	DF	(England) ENG	Chris Vinnicombe	30	1	20+3	0	2+0	0	1+0	0	3+1	1
	MF	(England) ENG	Chris Waddle	36	1	26+5	1	2+1	0	2+0	0	0+0	0
	MF	(England) ENG	Paul Weller	47	3	32+7	2	2+1	0	2+0	1	2+1	0
	FW	(England) ENG	Mike Williams	19	1	13+1	1	2+0	0	2+0	0	1+0	0
	FW	(England) ENG	Mark Winstanley	33	0	27+0	0	2+0	0	0+0	0	4+0	0
	GK	(England) ENG	Chris Woods	14	0	12+0	0	0+0	0	0+0	0	2+0	0

== Transfers ==
=== In ===
Pos	Player	From	Fee	Date
DF	(Netherlands) Marco Gentile	MVV Maastricht	Free	4 June 1997
DF	(England) Steve Blatherwick	Nottingham Forest	£125k	1 August 1997
MF	(England) Gordon Cowans	Stockport County	Free	1 August 1997
MF	(England) Mark Ford	Leeds United	£250k	1 August 1997
DF	(England) Lee Howey	Sunderland	£200k	11 August 1997
FW	(England) Andy Kiwomya	Bradford City	Loan	2 September 1997
FW	(Scotland) Gerry Creaney	Manchester City	Loan	19 September 1997
FW	(England) Kevin Henderson	Morpeth Town	Free	1 December 1997
FW	(England) Andy Payton	Huddersfield Town	Swap	16 January 1998
MF	(England) John Mullin	Sunderland	Loan	26 March 1998

=== Out ===
Pos	Player	To	Fee	Date
MF	(England) Adrian Heath		Retired	31 May 1997
FW	(England) Liam Robinson	Scarborough	Free	31 May 1997
MF	(England) Steve Thompson	Rotherham United	Free	31 May 1997
GK	(Wales) Wayne Russell	Ebbw Vale	Free	31 May 1997
DF	(England) Gary Parkinson	Preston North End	Free	1 August 1997
DF	(England) Peter Swan	Bury	£50k	8 August 1997
DF	(England) Vince Overson	Shrewsbury Town	Loan	19 September 1997
MF	(England) David Eyres	Preston North End	£80k	29 October 1997
DF	(Netherlands) Marco Gentile	FC Volendam	Free	31 October 1997
FW	(England) Ian Helliwell	Doncaster Rovers	Loan	3 November 1997
FW	(England) Nigel Gleghorn	Brentford	Loan	17 November 1997
MF	(England) Jamie Hoyland	Carlisle United	Loan	20 November 1997
FW	(England) Paul Barnes	Huddersfield Town	Swap	16 January 1998
FW	(England) Phil Eastwood	Telford United	Loan	7 February 1998
FW	(England) Nigel Gleghorn	Northampton Town	Loan	12 February 1998
GK	(England) Tony Parks	Doncaster Rovers	Loan	13 February 1998
DF	(England) Richard Huxford	Dunfermline Athletic	Loan	13 February 1998
GK	(England) Marlon Beresford	Middlesbrough	Free	10 March 1998

== Matches ==
=== Second Division ===
9 August 1997

Watford	1 – 0	Burnley
Lee 30'	(Report)

Vicarage Road, Watford
Attendance: 11,155
Referee: P Danson

16 August 1997

Burnley	0 – 0	Gillingham
	(Report)

Turf Moor, Burnley
Attendance: 11,811
Referee: G Laws

23 August 1997

Southend United	1 – 0	Burnley
Boere 6'	(Report)

Roots Hall, Southend
Attendance: 4,218
Referee: M Halsey

30 August 1997

Burnley	0 – 0	Bristol Rovers
	(Report)

Turf Moor, Burnley
Attendance: 9,887
Referee: T Heilbron

2 September 1997

Burnley	0 – 0	Oldham Athletic
	(Report)

Turf Moor, Burnley
Attendance: 11,189
Referee: P Robinson

7 September 1997

Chesterfield	1 – 0	Burnley
Lormor 3'	(Report)

Saltergate, Chesterfield
Attendance: 7,406
Referee: D Laws

13 September 1997

York City	3 – 1	Burnley
Davis 62'; Rowe 64'; Tolson 82'	(Report)	Barnes 12'

Bootham Crescent, York
Attendance: 5,424

20 September 1997

Burnley	1 – 1	Preston North End
Cooke 80'	(Report)	Nogan 19'

Turf Moor, Burnley
Attendance: 13,809
Referee: E Wolstenholme

27 September 1997

Brentford	2 – 1	Burnley
Hutchings 2'; Rapley 89'	(Report)	Ford 57'

Griffin Park, London
Attendance: 4,548
Referee: R Styles

4 October 1997

Burnley	2 – 2	Wycombe Wanderers
Creaney 3' 73'	(Report)	Cornforth 12' (pen.); Scott 54'

Turf Moor, Burnley
Attendance: 9,057
Referee: D Pugh

11 October 1997

Burnley	3 – 1	Carlisle United
Barnes 18'; Creaney 67' 71'	(Report)	Couzens 82'

Turf Moor, Burnley
Attendance: 10,687
Referee: A Wiley

18 October 1997

Wrexham	0 – 0	Burnley
	(Report)

Racecourse Ground, Wrexham
Attendance: 5,132
Referee: G Cain

21 October 1997

Plymouth Argyle	2 – 2	Burnley
Jean 40'; Heathcote 47'	(Report)	Eyres 8' (pen.); Creaney 58'

Home Park, Plymouth
Attendance: 3,006
Referee: P Rejer

25 October 1997

Burnley	2 – 2	Bournemouth
Waddle 45'; Creaney 65'	(Report)	Howe 58'; Vincent 68'

Turf Moor, Burnley
Attendance: 9,501
Referee: M Dean

1 November 1997

Burnley	2 – 1	Walsall
Barnes 27'; Cooke 80'	(Report)	Viveash 79'

Turf Moor, Burnley
Attendance: 9,293
Referee: E Lomas

4 November 1997

Luton Town	2 – 3	Burnley
Alexander 32' 35'	(Report)	Williams 25'; Creaney 62'; Barnes 65'

Kenilworth Road, Luton
Attendance: 5,315
Referee: B Knight

8 November 1997

Blackpool	2 – 1	Burnley
Clarkson 41'; Preece 74'	(Report)	Creaney 14'

Bloomfield Road, Blackpool
Attendance: 7,429
Referee: J Brandwood

18 November 1997

Burnley	1 – 2	Millwall
Cooke 29'	(Report)	Bowry 2'; Savage 63'

Turf Moor, Burnley
Attendance: 8,834
Referee: M Pike

22 November 1997

Grimsby Town	4 – 1	Burnley
Groves 19'; Widdrington 59'; Lester 73'; Nogan 78'	(Report)	Weller 16'

Blundell Park, Grimsby
Attendance: 4,829
Referee: A Butler

29 November 1997

Burnley	2 – 1	Northampton Town
Moore 76'; Barnes 82'	(Report)	Gibb 49'

Turf Moor, Burnley
Attendance: 8,369
Referee: M Messias

2 December 1997

Bristol City	3 – 1	Burnley
Goodridge 48' 83'; Bell 71' (pen.)	(Report)	Barnes 29'

Ashton Gate, Bristol
Attendance: 11,136
Referee: A Bates

13 December 1997

Burnley	0 – 2	Wigan Athletic
	(Report)	Lee 13'; Jones 44'

Turf Moor, Burnley
Attendance: 9,520
Referee: P Richards

19 December 1997

Fulham	1 – 0	Burnley
Cullip 89'	(Report)

Craven Cottage, London
Attendance: 5,096
Referee: P Danson

26 December 1997

Burnley	0 – 0	Chesterfield
	(Report)

Turf Moor, Burnley
Attendance: 10,861
Referee: T Heilbron

3 January 1998

Gillingham	2 – 0	Burnley
Butler 10'; Smith 68'	(Report)

Priestfield, Gillingham
Attendance: 5,886
Referee: S Bennett

10 January 1998

Burnley	2 – 0	Watford
Cooke 13' 35'	(Report)

Turf Moor, Burnley
Attendance: 9,551
Referee: R Pearson

17 January 1998

Bristol Rovers	1 – 0	Burnley
Cureton 50'	(Report)

Memorial Stadium, Bristol
Attendance: 7,208
Referee: R Styles

24 January 1998

Burnley	1 – 0	Southend United
Payton 43'	(Report)

Turf Moor, Burnley
Attendance: 9,386
Referee: P Rejer

31 January 1998

Burnley	7 – 2	York City
Moore 40'; Barras 43' (o.g.); Brass 46'; Cooke 49' 58' 88'; Payton 81'	(Report)	Pouton 34'; Barras 76'

Turf Moor, Burnley
Attendance: 9,975
Referee: E Lomas

7 February 1998

Preston North End	2 – 3	Burnley
Nogan 34'; Jackson 61'	(Report)	Payton 48'; Cooke 57'; Moore 90'

Deepdale, Preston
Attendance: 12,263
Referee: F Stretton

14 February 1998

Wycombe Wanderers	2 – 1	Burnley
Brown 32'; McCarthy 57'	(Report)	Cooke 88'

Adams Park, High Wycombe
Attendance: 5,926
Referee: S Baines

21 February 1998

Burnley	1 – 1	Brentford
Little 77'	(Report)	Taylor 50'

Turf Moor, Burnley
Attendance: 10,097
Referee: M Jones

24 February 1998

Burnley	1 – 2	Wrexham
Cooke 30'	(Report)	Roberts 11'; Wilson 64'

Turf Moor, Burnley
Attendance: 8,576
Referee: T Heilbron

28 February 1998

Carlisle United	2 – 1	Burnley
Stevens 18'; Smart 88'	(Report)	Cooke 50'

Brunton Park, Carlisle
Attendance: 7,192
Referee: S Mathieson

7 March 1998

Walsall	0 – 0	Burnley
	(Report)

Bescot Stadium, Walsall
Attendance: 5,212
Referee: G Laws

14 March 1998

Burnley	1 – 1	Luton Town
Payton 60'	(Report)	Thomas 79'

Turf Moor, Burnley
Attendance: 9,656
Referee: M Dean

21 March 1998

Millwall	1 – 0	Burnley
Grant 21'	(Report)

The New Den, London
Attendance: 7,582
Referee: J Brandwood

28 March 1998

Burnley	2 – 1	Grimsby Town
Little 12'; Payton 80'	(Report)	Lester 16'

Turf Moor, Burnley
Attendance: 8,256
Referee: J Kirkby

4 April 1998

Northampton Town	0 – 1	Burnley
	(Report)	Payton 16'

Sixfields Stadium, Northampton
Attendance: 7,264
Referee: A Hall

7 April 1998

Burnley	1 – 2	Blackpool
Payton 13'	(Report)	Clarkson 45'; Bent 51'

Turf Moor, Burnley
Attendance: 13,413
Referee: K Lynch

11 April 1998

Burnley	1 – 0	Bristol City
Payton 7' (pen.)	(Report)

Turf Moor, Burnley
Attendance: 10,600
Referee: A Butler

13 April 1998

Wigan Athletic	5 – 1	Burnley
Barlow 31'; Lowe 43' 87'; Warne 77'; Kilford 80'	(Report)	Little 47'

Springfield Park, Wigan
Attendance: 4,926
Referee: P Robinson

18 April 1998

Burnley	2 – 1	Fulham
Cooke 2'; Payton 83'	(Report)	Moody 35'

Turf Moor, Burnley
Attendance: 9,745
Referee: D Pugh

25 April 1998

Bournemouth	2 – 1	Burnley
Robinson 56' (pen.); Fletcher 61'	(Report)	Matthew 72' (pen.)

Dean Court, Bournemouth
Attendance: 6,527
Referee: D Crick

28 April 1998

Oldham Athletic	3 – 3	Burnley
Jepson 27'; Rickers 76'; Allott 77'	(Report)	Cooke 26'; Weller 32'; Little 38'

Boundary Park, Oldham
Attendance: 9,781 (5,300 away)
Referee: B Burns

2 May 1998

Burnley	2 – 1	Plymouth Argyle
Cooke 12' 41'	(Report)	Saunders 25'

Turf Moor, Burnley
Attendance: 18,811
Referee: P Taylor

=== Final league position ===
Pos	Team	Pld	W	D	L	GF	GA	GD	Pts	Promotion or relegation
18	Millwall	46	14	13	19	43	54	−11	55	
19	Walsall	46	14	12	20	43	52	−9	54	
20	Burnley	46	13	13	20	55	65	−10	52	
21	Brentford (R)	46	11	17	18	50	71	−21	50	Relegation to the Third Division
22	Plymouth Argyle (R)	46	12	13	21	55	70	−15	49	Relegation to the Third Division

Rules for classification: In the Football League goals scored (GF) takes precedence over goal difference (GD).
(R) Relegated

=== League Cup ===
==== 1st round first leg ====
12 August 1997

Lincoln City	1 – 1	Burnley
Stant 39'	(Report)	Howey 77'

Sincil Bank, Lincoln
Attendance: 3,010
Referee: S Baines

==== 1st round second leg ====
26 August 1997

Burnley	2 – 1	Lincoln City
Cooke 1'; Eyres 16' (pen.)	(Report)	Ainsworth 25'

Turf Moor, Burnley
Attendance: 4,644
Referee: C Foy

==== 2nd round first leg ====
16 September 1997

Burnley	0 – 4	Stoke City
	(Report)	Thorne 37' 62'; Kavanagh 68' 80'

Turf Moor, Burnley
Attendance: 4,175

==== 2nd round second leg ====
24 September 1997

Stoke City	2 – 0	Burnley
Keen 26'; Thorne 71'	(Report)

Britannia Stadium, Stoke-on-Trent
Attendance: 6,041
Referee: A D'Urso

=== FA Cup ===
==== 1st round ====
15 November 1997

Rotherham United	3 – 3	Burnley
Roscoe 17' 66'; Knill 36'	(Report)	Cooke 24'; Moore 37'; Weller 55'

Millmoor, Rotherham
Attendance: 5,709
Referee: F Stretton

==== 1st round replay ====
25 November 1997

Burnley	0 – 3	Rotherham United
	(Report)	White 24'; Berry 68'; Garner 88'

Turf Moor, Burnley
Attendance: 3,118
Referee: F Stretton

=== Football League Trophy ===
==== Northern Section 2nd round ====
27 January 1998

Burnley	2 – 0	Notts County
Little 22'; Cooke 61'	(Report)

Turf Moor, Burnley
Attendance: 2,442
Referee: T Jones

==== Northern Section quarter-final ====
3 February 1998

Burnley	4 – 1	Carlisle United
Payton 18'; Vinnicombe 61'; Cooke 73'; Henderson 89'	(Report)	Prokas 55'

Turf Moor, Burnley
Attendance: 4,573
Referee: R Furnandiz

==== Northern Section semi-final ====
17 February 1998

Burnley	1 – 0	Preston North End
Payton 39'	(Report)

Turf Moor, Burnley
Attendance: 10,079
Referee: E Wolstenholme

==== Northern Section final first leg ====
10 March 1998

Grimsby Town	1 – 1	Burnley
Groves 78'	(Report)	Payton 23'

Blundell Park, Grimsby
Attendance: 6,064
Referee: E Wolstenholme

==== Northern Section final second leg ====
17 March 1998

Burnley	0 – 2	Grimsby Town
	(Report)	Nogan 10'; Donovan 57'

Turf Moor, Burnley
Attendance: 10,257
Referee: A Wiley
