= 2000–01 Burnley F.C. season =

English football club season

Burnley
2000–01 season
- Chairman: Barry Kilby
- Manager: Stan Ternent
- First Division: 7th
- FA Cup: Third round
- League Cup: Second round
- Top goalscorer: League: Andy Payton (9); All: Andy Payton (15)
- Highest home attendance: 21,369 v Blackburn Rovers (17 December 2000)
- Lowest home attendance: 3,319 v Hartlepool United (22 August 2000)
- Average home league attendance: 16,234
Home colours

The 2000–01 season was Burnley's 1st season in the second tier of English football since 1994/95. They were managed by Stan Ternent in his third full season since he replaced Chris Waddle at the beginning 1998–99 campaign.

== Appearances and goals ==
No.	Pos	Nat	Player	Total		First Division		League Cup		FA Cup	
No.	Pos	Nat	Player	Apps	Goals	Apps	Goals	Apps	Goals	Apps	Goals
1	GK	(England) ENG	Paul Crichton	10	0	7+1	0	2+0	0	0+0	0
2	DF	(England) ENG	Dean West	7	0	6+1	0	0+0	0	0+0	0
3	DF	(England) ENG	Mitchell Thomas	49	0	41+2	0	4+0	0	2+0	0
4	MF	(Scotland) SCO	Micky Mellon	26	0	19+4	0	1+1	0	1+0	0
5	DF	(England) ENG	Steve Davis	50	6	44+0	5	4+0	1	2+0	0
6	DF	(England) ENG	Gordon Armstrong	21	0	14+5	0	1+0	0	0+1	0
7	MF	(England) ENG	Glen Little	39	3	27+7	3	3+0	0	0+2	0
8	MF	(England) ENG	Paul Cook	46	3	38+2	3	3+1	0	2+0	0
9	FW	(England) ENG	Andy Cooke	15	5	10+1	2	4+0	3	0+0	0
9	FW	(Wales) WAL	Gareth Taylor (on loan)	15	4	15+0	4	0+0	0	0+0	0
10	FW	(England) ENG	Andy Payton	46	15	18+22	9	2+2	5	1+1	1
11	MF	(England) ENG	Lenny Johnrose	21	2	9+10	1	0+0	0	1+1	1
12	FW	(England) ENG	Ronnie Jepson	15	0	0+13	0	0+2	0	0+0	0
13	GK	(England) ENG	Craig Mawson	0	0	0+0	0	0+0	0	0+0	0
14	DF	(England) ENG	Chris Brass	0	0	0+0	0	0+0	0	0+0	0
15	MF	(England) ENG	Graham Branch	41	5	26+9	5	2+2	0	2+0	0
16	FW	(Northern Ireland) NIR	Phil Gray	8	1	5+0	1	2+1	0	0+0	0
16	FW	(England) ENG	Ian Moore	29	6	26+1	5	0+0	0	2+0	1
17	MF	(England) ENG	Paul Smith	15	1	10+4	1	0+0	0	1+0	0
18	MF	(England) ENG	Paul Weller	48	3	39+5	3	2+0	0	2+0	0
19	DF	(England) ENG	Lee Briscoe	32	0	25+4	0	3+0	0	0+0	0
20	MF	(England) ENG	Brad Maylett	14	0	2+10	0	0+2	0	0+0	0
21	DF	(England) ENG	Chris Scott	0	0	0+0	0	0+0	0	0+0	0
22	DF	(England) ENG	John Williamson	0	0	0+0	0	0+0	0	0+0	0
23	DF	(England) ENG	Matthew Heywood	0	0	0+0	0	0+0	0	0+0	0
24	DF	(England) ENG	Michael Devenney	0	0	0+0	0	0+0	0	0+0	0
26	MF	(England) ENG	Alex Kevan	0	0	0+0	0	0+0	0	0+0	0
27	DF	(England) ENG	John Boardman	0	0	0+0	0	0+0	0	0+0	0
28	MF	(England) ENG	Kevin Ball	45	2	40+0	2	4+0	0	1+0	0
29	FW	(Republic of Ireland) IRL	Alan Lee	0	0	0+0	0	0+0	0	0+0	0
30	MF	(England) ENG	John Mullin	37	3	11+23	3	1+0	0	1+1	0
31	FW	(England) ENG	Anthony Shandran	1	0	0+1	0	0+0	0	0+0	0
32	DF	(Trinidad and Tobago) TTO	Ian Cox	44	1	35+3	1	4+0	0	2+0	0
33	MF	(England) ENG	Scott Oakes	0	0	0+0	0	0+0	0	0+0	0
34	GK	(Greece) GRE	Nikolaos Michopoulos	43	0	39+0	0	2+0	0	2+0	0
35	FW	(England) ENG	Paul Robinson (on loan)	3	0	0+3	0	0+0	0	0+0	0

== Transfers ==
=== In ===
#	Pos	Player	From	Fee	Date
27	DF	(England) John Boardman	Liverpool	Free	7 June 2000
19	DF	(England) Lee Briscoe	Sheffield Wednesday	Free	12 June 2000
16	FW	(Northern Ireland) Phil Gray	Luton Town	Free	17 June 2000
28	MF	(England) Kevin Ball	Fulham	Free	24 June 2000
33	MF	(England) Scott Oakes	Sheffield Wednesday	Free	1 August 2000
34	GK	(Greece) Nikolaos Michopoulos	PAOK	Free	25 August 2000
35	FW	(England) Paul Robinson	Wimbledon	Loan	9 October 2000
16	FW	(England) Ian Moore	Stockport County	£1m	20 November 2000
9	FW	(Wales) Gareth Taylor	Manchester City	Loan	19 February 2001

=== Out ===
#	Pos	Player	To	Fee	Date
	MF	(England) Eamonn Kelly		Released	22 May 2000
	FW	(England) Ian Wright		Retired	7 June 2000
	DF	(Scotland) Tom Cowan	Cambridge United	Free	18 June 2000
	MF	(Australia) Mark Robertson	Swindon Town	Free	22 August 2000
29	FW	(Republic of Ireland) Alan Lee	Rotherham United	Loan	21 September 2000
24	DF	(England) Michael Devenney	Leigh RMI	Loan	22 September 2000
17	MF	(England) Paul Smith	Oldham Athletic	Loan	22 September 2000
21	DF	(England) Chris Scott	Leigh RMI	Loan	22 September 2000
14	DF	(England) Chris Brass	Halifax Town	Loan	22 September 2000
13	GK	(England) Craig Mawson	Lincoln City	Loan	28 September 2000
33	MF	(England) Scott Oakes	Cambridge United	Free	30 October 2000
16	FW	(Northern Ireland) Phil Gray	Oxford United	Free	10 November 2000
29	FW	(Republic of Ireland) Alan Lee	Rotherham United	£150k	15 November 2000
9	FW	(England) Andy Cooke	Stoke City	£300k	1 December 2000
23	DF	(England) Matthew Heywood	Swindon Town	Free	22 January 2001
13	GK	(England) Craig Mawson	Halifax Town	Free	16 February 2001
4	MF	(Scotland) Micky Mellon	Tranmere Rovers	Loan	5 March 2001
4	MF	(Scotland) Micky Mellon	Tranmere Rovers	Free	8 March 2001
14	DF	(England) Chris Brass	York City	Free	15 March 2001

== Matches ==
=== First Division ===
12 August 2000
3:00 p.m.

Bolton Wanderers	1–1	Burnley
Frandsen 28' (pen.)	(Report)	Gray 56'

Reebok Stadium, Bolton
Attendance: 20,662 (5,500 away)
Referee: B Burns

19 August 2000
3:00 p.m.

Burnley	1–0	Wimbledon
Weller 27'	(Report)

Turf Moor, Burnley
Attendance: 15,124 (357 away)
Referee: S Baines

26 August 2000
3:00 p.m.

Wolverhampton Wanderers	1–0	Burnley
Sedgley 74'	(Report)

Molineux, Wolverhampton
Attendance: 20,156 (2,682 away)
Referee: M Jones

28 August 2000
3:00 p.m.

Burnley	1–1	Gillingham
Ashby 70' (o.g.)	(Report)	Asaba 66'

Turf Moor, Burnley
Attendance: 15,611 (517 away)
Referee: P Jones

9 September 2000
3:00 p.m.

Crystal Palace	0– 1	Burnley
	(Report)	Branch 77'

Selhurst Park, London
Attendance: 18,531 (1,600 away)
Referee: J Winter

12 September 2000
7:45 p.m.

Fulham	3–1	Burnley
Goldbæk 53'; Saha 64' 81'	(Report)	Payton 90'

Craven Cottage, London
Attendance: 11,863 (1,410 away)
Referee: T Parkes

16 September 2000
3:00 p.m.

Burnley	1–1	Grimsby Town
Cooke 18'	(Report)	Butterfield 11'

Turf Moor, Burnley
Attendance: 15,413 (166 away)
Referee: P Dowd

23 September 2000
3:00 p.m.

Huddersfield Town	0–1	Burnley
	(Report)	Payton 17'

Galpharm Stadium, Huddersfield
Attendance: 14,016 (3,988 away)
Referee: U Rennie

30 September 2000
3:00 p.m.

Burnley	1–1	Portsmouth
Weller 88'	(Report)	Claridge 74'

Turf Moor, Burnley
Attendance: 15,494 (653 away)
Referee: R Pearson

6 October 2000
7:45 p.m.

Tranmere Rovers	2–3	Burnley
Koumas 57'; Hill 64'	(Report)	Davis 45' 55'; Payton 90'

Prenton Park, Birkenhead
Attendance: 10,153 (2,500 away)
Referee: P Jones

14 October 2000
3:00 p.m.

Burnley	2–1	Stockport County
Payton 20'; Branch 25'	(Report)	Tod 56'

Turf Moor, Burnley
Attendance: 16,107 (949 away)
Referee: M Riley

17 October 2000
7:45 p.m.

Burnley	1–0	Sheffield Wednesday
Davis 74'	(Report)

Turf Moor, Burnley
Attendance: 16,372 (959 away)
Referee: P Danson

21 October 2000
3:00 p.m.

Queens Park Rangers	0–1	Burnley
	(Report)	Mullin 70'

Loftus Road, London
Attendance: 11,427 (1,800 away)
Referee: R Olivier

25 October 2000
7:45 p.m.

Nottingham Forest	5–0	Burnley
Bart-Williams 4' 54' (pen.); Johnson 45'; Rogers 76'; Scimeca 89'	(Report)

City Ground, Nottingham
Attendance: 17,915 (2,400 away)
Referee: S Mathieson

31 October 2000
7:45 p.m.

Burnley	1–0	Crewe Alexandra
Cooke 39'	(Report)

Turf Moor, Burnley
Attendance: 13,189 (800 away)
Referee: A Hall

4 November 2000
3:00 p.m.

West Bromwich Albion	1–1	Burnley
Roberts 87'	(Report)	Branch 23'

The Hawthorns, West Bromwich
Attendance: 17,828 (2,458 away)
Referee: B Jordan

11 November 2000
3:00 p.m.

Burnley	2–0	Sheffield United
Payton 55' (pen.) 67'	(Report)

Turf Moor, Burnley
Attendance: 16,635 (1,084 away)
Referee: G Laws

18 November 2000
3:00 p.m.

Birmingham City	3–2	Burnley
Adebola 48'; O'Connor 50'; Burchill 86'	(Report)	Cox 61'; Weller 90'

St Andrew's, Birmingham
Attendance: 19,641 (2,725 away)
Referee: G Cain

21 November 2000
7:45 p.m.

Burnley	2–0	Norwich City
Payton 56'; Davis 66'	(Report)

Turf Moor, Burnley
Attendance: 15,017 (369 away)
Referee: M Pike

2 December 2000
3:00 p.m.

Burnley	1–0	Nottingham Forest
Payton 79' (pen.)	(Report)

Turf Moor, Burnley
Attendance: 17,876 (1,948 away)
Referee: T Jones

9 December 2000
3:00 p.m.

Preston North End	2–1	Burnley
Macken 51'; Alexander 67'	(Report)	Moore 26'

Deepdale, Preston
Attendance: 17,355 (2,700 away)
Referee: C Wilkes

17 December 2000
4:00 p.m.

Burnley	0–2	Blackburn Rovers
	(Report)	McAteer 45'; Bent 90'

Turf Moor, Burnley
Attendance: 21,369 (3,277 away)
Referee: G Stretton

23 December 2000
3:00 p.m.

Burnley	0–2	Bolton Wanderers
	(Report)	Ricketts 53' 72'

Turf Moor, Burnley
Attendance: 19,552 (3,782 away)
Referee: P Richards

26 December 2000
3:00 p.m.

Barnsley	1–0	Burnley
Morgan 90'	(Report)

Oakwell, Barnsley
Attendance: 18,725 (5,165 away)
Referee: M Warren

1 January 2001
1:00 p.m.

Burnley	1–2	Wolverhampton Wanderers
Branch 9'	(Report)	Proudlock 28'; Naylor 85'

Turf Moor, Burnley
Attendance: 15,483 (1,127 away)
Referee: R Furnandiz

13 January 2001
3:00 p.m.

Gillingham	0–0	Burnley
	(Report)

Priestfield, Gillingham
Attendance: 9,331 (864 away)
Referee: P Dowd

20 January 2001
3:00 p.m.

Burnley	2–1	Barnsley
Johnrose 23'; Payton 61'	(Report)	Hayward 77'

Turf Moor, Burnley
Attendance: 15,380 (836 away)
Referee: C Webster

3 February 2001
3:00 p.m.

Crewe Alexandra	4–2	Burnley
Street 5'; Smith 40' (pen.) 44' (pen.); Ashton 85'	(Report)	Branch 12'; Cook 60' (pen.)

Gresty Road, Crewe
Attendance: 6,994 (1,630 away)
Referee: A Kaye

10 February 2001
3:00 p.m.

Burnley	1–2	Crystal Palace
Cook 13'	(Report)	Forssell 75'; Morrison 90'

Turf Moor, Burnley
Attendance: 14,973 (619 away)
Referee: B Burns

17 February 2001
3:00 p.m.

Grimsby Town	1–0	Burnley
Enhua 55'	(Report)

Blundell Park, Grimsby
Attendance: 6,044 (1,432 away)
Referee: U Rennie

20 February 2001
7:45 p.m.

Burnley	2–1	Fulham
Moore 73'; Little 88'	(Report)	Hayles 49'

Turf Moor, Burnley
Attendance: 15,737 (527 away)
Referee: S Lodge

24 February 2001
3:00 p.m.

Burnley	1–0	Huddersfield Town
Davis 48'	(Report)

Turf Moor, Burnley
Attendance: 16,191 (1,409 away)
Referee: D Crick

3 March 2001
3:00 p.m.

Portsmouth	2–0	Burnley
Nightingale 56'; Panopoulos 69' (pen.)	(Report)

Fratton Park, Portsmouth
Attendance: 12,941 (1,104 away)
Referee: N Barry

6 March 2001
7:45 p.m.

Stockport County	0–0	Burnley
	(Report)

Edgeley Park, Stockport
Attendance: 7,087 (2,030 away)
Referee: R Beeby

13 March 2001
7:45 p.m.

Watford	0–1	Burnley
	(Report)	Taylor 73'

Vicarage Road, Watford
Attendance: 13,653 (1,098 away)
Referee: G Laws

17 March 2001
3:00 p.m.

Sheffield Wednesday	2–0	Burnley
Hendon 42'; Sibon 70' (pen.)	(Report)

Hillsborough, Burnley
Attendance: 20,184 (3,266 away)
Referee: P Rejer

24 March 2001
1:00 p.m.

Burnley	2–1	Queens Park Rangers
Smith 13'; Taylor 42'	(Report)	Bignot 56'

Turf Moor, Burnley
Attendance: 14,018 (446 away)
Referee: D Pugh

1 April 2001
12:00 p.m.

Blackburn Rovers	5–0	Burnley
Short 15'; Davis 25'; Jansen 55' 70'; Hignett 82'	(Report)

Ewood Park, Blackburn
Attendance: 23,442 (5,100 away)
Referee: A Butler

6 April 2001
7:45 p.m.

Burnley	3–0	Preston North End
Moore 3'; Ball 45'; Little 73'	(Report)

Turf Moor, Burnley
Attendance: 16,591 (2,900 away)
Referee: A Leake

10 April 2001
7:45 p.m.

Wimbledon	0–2	Burnley
	(Report)	Taylor 1'; Moore 45'

Selhurst Park, London
Attendance: 6,132 (746 away)
Referee: J Brandwood

14 April 2001
3:00 p.m.

Burnley	1–1	West Bromwich Albion
Little 46'	(Report)	Taylor 84'

Turf Moor, Burnley
Attendance: 18,199 (2,739 away)
Referee: C Foy

16 April 2001
3:00 p.m.

Norwich City	2–3	Burnley
Notman 13'; Roberts 38' (pen.)	(Report)	Ball 24'; Taylor 48'; Moore 62'

Carrow Road, Norwich
Attendance: 17,507 (1,213 away)
Referee: M Messias

21 April 2001
3:00 p.m.

Burnley	0–0	Birmingham City
	(Report)

Turf Moor, Burnley
Attendance: 17,057 (1,312 away)
Referee: R Furnandiz

24 April 2001
7:45 p.m.

Burnley	2–1	Tranmere Rovers
Roberts 23' (o.g.); Mullin 59'	(Report)	Yates 20'

Turf Moor, Burnley
Attendance: 13,717 (314 away)
Referee: P Taylor

28 April 2001
3:00 p.m.

Sheffield United	2–0	Burnley
Ndlovu 21'; Asaba 89'	(Report)

Bramall Lane, Sheffield
Attendance: 20,013 (2,752 away)
Referee: D Laws

6 May 2001
1:30 p.m.

Burnley	2–0	Watford
Payton 74'; Mullin 90'	(Report)

Turf Moor, Burnley
Attendance: 18,283
Referee: M Fletcher

=== Final league position ===
Pos	Team	Pld	W	D	L	GF	GA	GD	Pts	Qualification or relegation
5	Birmingham City	46	23	9	14	59	48	+11	78	Qualification for the First Division play-offs
6	West Bromwich Albion	46	21	11	14	60	52	+8	74	Qualification for the First Division play-offs
7	Burnley	46	21	9	16	50	54	−4	72	
8	Wimbledon	46	17	18	11	71	50	+21	69	
9	Watford	46	20	9	17	76	67	+9	69	

Rules for classification: 1) Points; 2) Goal difference; 3) Goals scored

=== League Cup ===
==== 1st round first leg ====
22 August 2000
7:45 p.m.

Burnley	4–1	Hartlepool United
Payton 63' (pen.) 69' 90'; Davis 87'	(Report)	Miller 37'

Turf Moor, Burnley
Attendance: 3,319 (150 away)
Referee: A Kaye

==== 1st round second leg ====
5 September 2000
7:30 p.m.

Hartlepool United	3–2	Burnley
Miller 30' (pen.); Fitzpatrick 38'; Stephenson 90'	(Report)	Cooke 18'; Payton 82'

Victoria Park, Hartlepool
Attendance: 1,090 (188 away)

==== 2nd round first leg ====
19 September 2000
7:45 p.m.

Burnley	2–2	Crystal Palace
Cooke 68'; Payton 83' (pen.)	(Report)	Forssell 17'; Black 47'

Turf Moor, Burnley
Attendance: 5,889 (190 away)
Referee: M Dean

==== 2nd round second leg ====
26 September 2000
7:45 p.m.

Crystal Palace	1–1	Burnley
Linighan 90'	(Report)	Cooke 45'

Selhurst Park, London
Attendance: 5,720 (403 away)
Referee: M Halsey

=== FA Cup ===
==== 3rd round ====
6 January 2001
3:00 p.m.

Burnley	2–2	Scunthorpe United
Moore 45'; Johnrose 90'	(Report)	Hodges 2'; Ipoua 47'

Turf Moor, Burnley
Attendance: 8,054 (1,236 away)
Referee: G Frankland

==== 3rd round replay ====
23 January 2001
7:45 p.m.

Scunthorpe United	1–1 (a.e.t.)	Burnley
Dawson 82'	(Report)	Payton 73'
Penalties
Morrison (penalty missed); Stamp (penalty scored); Dawson (penalty scored); Ipoua (penalty scored); Lárusson (penalty scored); Wilcox (penalty scored)	5–4	(penalty missed) Davis; (penalty scored) Armstrong; (penalty scored) Little; (penalty scored) Moore; (penalty scored) Mullin; (penalty missed) Ball

Glanford Park, Scunthorpe
Attendance: 4,709 (1,018 away)
Referee: G Frankland
