= Marco Gentile =

Marco Gentile may refer to:

- Marco Gentile (footballer)
- Marco Gentile (motorcyclist)
