= Paul Cook (footballer) =

English football manager and former player (born 1967)

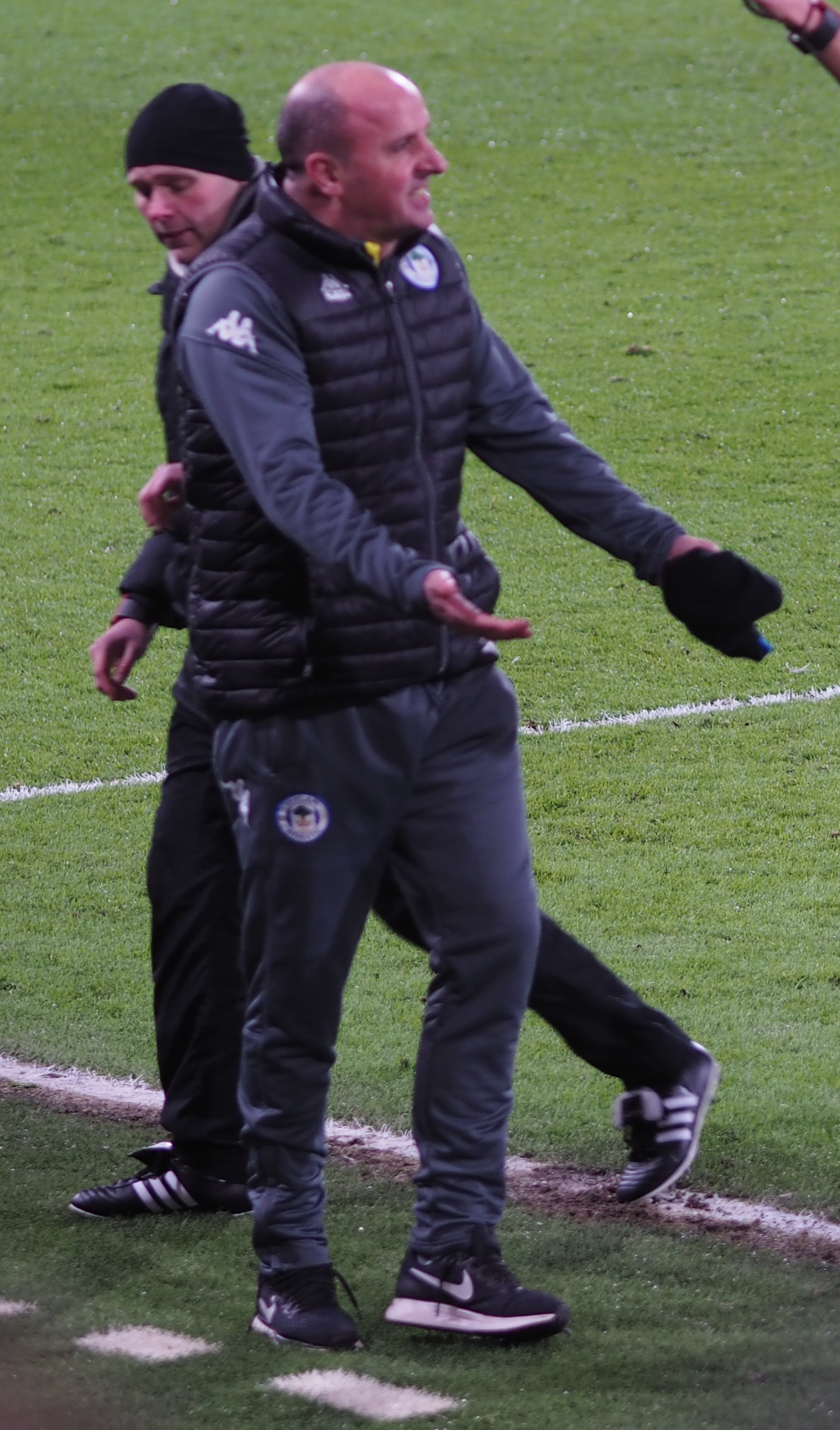
- Cook as manager of Wigan Athletic in 2018

Personal information
- Full name: Paul Anthony Cook
- Date of birth: 22 February 1967 (age 59)
- Place of birth: Liverpool, Lancashire, England
- Height: 5 ft 11 in (1.80 m)
- Position: Central midfielder

Team information
- Current team: Chesterfield (manager)

Senior career*
Years	Team	Apps	(Gls)
1983–1984	Marine	0	(0)
1984–1988	Wigan Athletic	83	(14)
1988–1989	Norwich City	6	(0)
1989–1994	Wolverhampton Wanderers	193	(19)
1994–1996	Coventry City	37	(3)
1996–1997	Tranmere Rovers	60	(4)
1997–1999	Stockport County	49	(3)
1999	→ Burnley (loan)	12	(1)
1999–2003	Burnley	135	(11)
2001–2002	→ Wigan Athletic (loan)	6	(0)
2003–2006	Accrington Stanley	62	(1)
Total		643	(56)

Managerial career
- 2006–2007: Southport
- 2007–2012: Sligo Rovers
- 2012: Accrington Stanley
- 2012–2015: Chesterfield
- 2015–2017: Portsmouth
- 2017–2020: Wigan Athletic
- 2021: Ipswich Town
- 2022–: Chesterfield
- * Club domestic league appearances and goals

Paul Anthony Cook (born 22 February 1967) is an English professional football manager and former footballer who manages EFL League Two side Chesterfield.

Cook played as a central midfielder during a playing career that spanned 23 years from 1983 until 2006, notably playing in the Premier League for Coventry City. He also played in the Football League for Wigan Athletic, Norwich City, Wolverhampton Wanderers, Tranmere Rovers, Stockport County and Burnley.

Cook moved into management in 2006 with Southport and later moved on to Irish side Sligo Rovers in 2007. In February 2012, he returned to English management with Accrington Stanley before moving to Chesterfield in October 2012. Cook guided Chesterfield to the League Two title in the 2013–14 season. In May 2015, he was appointed manager of League Two outfit Portsmouth after a release clause was met in his Chesterfield contract. Cook led Portsmouth to the League Two title in the 2016–17 season. In May 2017, he was appointed manager of League One club Wigan Athletic. Cook led Wigan to the League One title and promotion into the Championship. After the club fell into administration, Wigan were relegated from the Championship in the 2019–20 season following a 12-point deduction. Cook resigned as Wigan manager in July 2020. Following his departure from Wigan Athletic, Cook remained unemployed until March 2021 where he was appointed as the manager of Ipswich Town on a contract until 2023. However, Cook was relieved of his duties at Ipswich in early December 2021. Cook returned to Chesterfield as manager in February 2022. He led Chesterfield to promotion as champions in the 2023–24 season.

== Playing career ==
Cook was born in Liverpool, Lancashire. He began his career in 1983 at local non-league side Marine but made no appearances. In 1984, Cook was signed by Wigan Athletic, where he featured in 83 league games in a four-year spell. Cook then had a brief and unsuccessful spell at Norwich City before moving to the Midlands to sign for Wolverhampton Wanderers for £250,000.

He was a very popular player during his time at Wolves, both with the fans and his teammates and became known for his deadly and accurate left foot. After 193 league appearances for Wolves over five seasons in the second tier, Cook left to sign for Premier League side Coventry City.

Cook played the majority of his games at Coventry in his first season (1994/95) but fell out of favour during the following campaign, where he made only three appearances. In February 1996, Cook was sold to Tranmere Rovers for £250,000.

Whilst at Tranmere, he became a key member of the side, playing 60 league games in just eighteen months. In October 1997, Tranmere accepted a bid of £250,000 from Stockport County and regained the fee initially paid for Cook. After twelve months at County, Cook began to be regarded as 'too old', despite only being 32. This led to Cook making a loan move to Burnley before making the move permanent in July 1999.

After a falling out with Burnley manager Stan Ternent, Cook went on loan to his former club Wigan Athletic, but made just six appearances before he was re-called to again take his place in the starting line up at Turf Moor. Cook left Burnley at the end of the 2002/03 season, alongside teammate Andy Payton. The two players received a standing ovation from the fans for their contributions to the club.

Cook signed for non-league side Accrington Stanley and went on to become a first team regular in their push for promotion to the Football League. This target was finally achieved in the 2005/06 season when Stanley were crowned as Champions of the Conference. After achieving this aim, Cook retired after 643 league appearances for nine different clubs.

After the end of the 2005/06 season, Cook was granted a testimonial by Accrington as a sign of appreciation for his efforts. The testimonial was played on 2 May 2006 at the Interlink Express (now the Wham) Stadium; Accrington against a Burnley Select XI featuring old teammates Dean West, Lenny Johnrose, Ian Cox, Kevin Ball and Cook's son Liam.

== Management career ==
=== Southport ===
Cook was appointed manager of Conference side Southport on 13 June 2006, a post he was sacked from in January 2007 following defeat at Northwich Victoria.

=== Sligo Rovers ===
On 27 April 2007, Cook was appointed manager of Sligo Rovers taking over from Rob McDonald, who resigned before the start of the season. During Cook's unveiling, he stated that he was from Liverpool and that he will not have anything to do with any journalist from the Irish Sun, (due to the articles printed about Liverpool supporters during the Hillsborough disaster). He led Rovers to a 6th place league finish in his first season in charge. Cook's second season saw him guide the bit o' red to fourth in the league and thus secure a UEFA Cup place.

Cook departed in January 2009 by mutual consent, but soon returned to Sligo a few weeks later after his initial departure.

In his third season, under severe financial constraints, Cook managed a sixth place finish in the league. In addition, Cook guided Rovers to the final of the FAI Cup which took place on 22 November 2009. Cook's Sligo Rovers side lost 2–1 to Sporting Fingal, despite holding a one-goal lead with seven minutes remaining, a huge disappointment for Cook, Rovers and the people of Sligo.

Cook would soon redeem himself from the cup shortcomings of 2009, with his first piece of silverware as Sligo Rovers manager coming in September 2010, after a 1–0 win over Monaghan United in the final of the League Cup. In November 2010, he brought the FAI Cup back to the north-west, after beating Shamrock Rovers on penalties, with Sligo Rovers goalkeeper Ciaran Kelly saving all 4 penalties. The 2010 FAI Cup Final was the first major trophy by Cook for Sligo Rovers. The 2010 League of Ireland season also saw Cook guide Rovers to a 3rd place league finish, securing UEFA Europa League action for the 2011 season.

In November 2011, Cook won a successive FAI Cup following a 4–1 penalty shootout win against Shelbourne. Cook also guided Sligo to 2nd place in the League of Ireland in his final season in charge.

=== Accrington Stanley ===
Following his success in Ireland, Cook was appointed manager of Accrington Stanley on 13 February 2012. He led the team to finish 14th in League Two at the end of the 2011/12 season and continued to manage the side for the opening months of the following campaign.

=== Chesterfield ===
On 25 October 2012, Cook joined League Two rivals Chesterfield on a two-and-a-half-year contract, taking over from Tommy Wright, who had been in charge of the Derbyshire club on a caretaker basis following the departure of John Sheridan. The end of his first season saw Cook guide Chesterfield to eighth position finishing just two points outside the play-off zone.

The following season saw Cook guide Chesterfield to the 2013/14 League Two title.

The following campaign saw Chesterfield finish 6th in League One and the play-offs before losing to eventual play-off winners Preston North End.

=== Portsmouth ===
On 12 May 2015, Cook was appointed manager of League Two club Portsmouth after Portsmouth met Cook's release clause in his contract at Chesterfield. Cook guided Portsmouth to the League Two title in the 2016/17 season.

=== Wigan Athletic ===
On 31 May 2017, Cook was appointed manager of newly relegated League One club Wigan Athletic on a three-year contract, after a compensation package was agreed with Portsmouth. He led Wigan to the League One title and on an impressive FA Cup run that claimed three shocks against top flight opponents West Ham United, AFC Bournemouth and Manchester City. Cook resigned as Wigan manager on 29 July 2020, following the club's relegation from the Championship due to a 12-point deduction after the Latics entered administration.

=== Ipswich Town ===
On 2 March 2021, Cook was appointed manager of Ipswich Town on a contract until 2023. Cook's first match in charge was a 3–1 defeat away at Gillingham. His first victory as Ipswich manager came in his third game in charge, a 1–0 home win over Plymouth Argyle. On 7 April 2021, Ipswich Town was taken over by US investment group Gamechanger 20 Limited, with the club confirming that Cook would remain as manager under the new ownership. Ipswich finished 9th in League One at the end of the 2020–21 season.

Ahead of the 2021–22 season, Cook oversaw a major turnover in both the playing squad and coaching staff, backed by the club's new US owners. Over a dozen first team players from the previous season departed with 19 new players joining. The players that departed included longtime club captain Luke Chambers, first team regulars such as Flynn Downes, Andre Dozzell, Gwion Edwards, Alan Judge, Emyr Huws and Teddy Bishop, and 2020–21 player of the season James Wilson. Despite these changes and many tipping the club for promotion, Ipswich made a poor start to the season, taking only two wins in their opening 10 matches. On 4 December 2021, with the team sat in 11th and 7 points adrift of the playoffs, Cook was sacked by the club. Having been in charge for just over 9 months, Cook is the second-shortest serving manager in the club's history. Cook argued that he deserved more time in an interview a month after his dismissal, stating "If the new ownership had sat down and said to me at the start that if we didn't have instant success then [I would] be gone, then I wouldn't have stayed. That's my only regret."

=== Return to Chesterfield ===
On 10 February 2022, Cook was appointed manager of Chesterfield, returning to the National League club seven years after leaving. An impressive start to the 2022–23 saw Chesterfield sitting top of the league at the end of the first month, Cook being awarded the National League Manager of the Month award for his efforts.

He won the award for a second time for January 2024 having overseen five victories from five matches as his side sat over twenty points clear at the top of the table. Having led the division since mid-September, Chesterfield sealed promotion to the Football League as champions with five games remaining. The club also broke a previous club record of 27 league wins in a season.

== Media career ==
Cook has appeared on RTÉ coverage of League of Ireland matches.

== Personal life ==
His son, Connor, also plays professional football.

== Career statistics ==
Appearances and goals by club, season and competition
Club	Season	League			FA Cup		League Cup		Other		Total	
Club	Season	Division	Apps	Goals	Apps	Goals	Apps	Goals	Apps	Goals	Apps	Goals
Wigan Athletic	1984–85	Third Division	2	0	0	0	0	0	0	0	2	0
Wigan Athletic	1985–86	Third Division	13	2	1	0	0	0	3 (Note: Appearances in Football League Trophy)	0	17	2
Wigan Athletic	1986–87	Third Division	27	4	4	0	1	0	2	1	34	5
Wigan Athletic	1987–88	Third Division	41	8	2	0	3	0	1	0	47	8
Wigan Athletic	Total		83	14	7	0	4	0	6	1	101	15
Norwich City	1988–89	First Division	4	0	0	0	0	0	2 (Note: Appearances in Full Members' Cup)	0	6	0
Norwich City	1989–90	First Division	2	0	0	0	0	0	0	0	2	0
Norwich City	Total		6	0	0	0	0	0	2	0	8	0
Wolverhampton Wanderers	1989–90	Second Division	28	2	1	0	0	0	1	0	30	2
Wolverhampton Wanderers	1990–91	Second Division	42	6	0	0	2	0	2	1	46	7
Wolverhampton Wanderers	1991–92	Second Division	43	8	1	0	2	0	1	0	47	8
Wolverhampton Wanderers	1992–93	First Division	44	1	2	0	2	1	2 (Note: Appearances in Anglo-Italian Cup)	0	50	2
Wolverhampton Wanderers	1993–94	First Division	36	2	3	0	1	0	1	0	41	2
Wolverhampton Wanderers	Total		193	19	7	0	7	1	7	1	214	21
Coventry City	1994–95	Premier League	34	3	3	0	3	0	0	0	40	3
Coventry City	1995–96	Premier League	3	0	0	0	0	0	0	0	3	0
Coventry City	Total		37	3	3	0	3	0	0	0	43	3
Tranmere Rovers	1995–96	First Division	15	1	0	0	0	0	0	0	15	1
Tranmere Rovers	1996–97	First Division	36	3	1	0	4	0	0	0	41	3
Tranmere Rovers	1997–98	First Division	9	0	0	0	4	0	0	0	13	0
Tranmere Rovers	Total		60	4	1	0	8	0	0	0	69	4
Stockport County	1997–98	First Division	25	3	1	0	0	0	0	0	26	3
Stockport County	1998–99	First Division	24	0	1	0	2	0	0	0	27	0
Stockport County	Total		49	3	2	0	2	0	0	0	53	3
Burnley (loan)	1998–99	Second Division	12	1	0	0	0	0	0	0	12	1
Burnley	1999–2000	Second Division	44	3	4	2	1	0	0	0	49	5
Burnley	2000–01	First Division	40	3	2	0	4	0	0	0	46	3
Burnley	2001–02	First Division	28	5	1	0	1	0	0	0	30	5
Burnley	2002–03	First Division	23	0	6	1	3	0	0	0	32	1
Burnley	Total		147	12	13	3	9	0	0	0	169	15
Wigan Athletic (loan)	2001–02	Second Division	6	0	0	0	0	0	0	0	6	0
Accrington Stanley	2003–04	Football Conference	34	1	6	0	0	0	1 (Note: Appearances in FA Trophy)	0	41	1
Accrington Stanley	2004–05	Conference National	24	0	0	0	0	0	2	0	26	0
Accrington Stanley	2005–06	Conference National	4	0	0	0	0	0	0	0	4	0
Accrington Stanley	Total		62	1	6	0	0	0	3	0	71	1
Career total			643	56	39	3	33	1	18	2	723	62

== Managerial statistics ==
As of match played 21 November 2026

Managerial record by team and tenure
Team	From	To	Record					Ref.
Team	From	To	P	W	D	L	Win %	Ref.
Southport	13 June 2006	3 January 2007	28	5	8	15	17.9	
Sligo Rovers	27 April 2007	13 February 2012	203	95	52	56	46.8	
Accrington Stanley	13 February 2012	25 October 2012	33	8	7	18	24.2	
Chesterfield	25 October 2012	12 May 2015	145	65	36	44	44.8	
Portsmouth	12 May 2015	31 May 2017	107	52	27	28	48.6	
Wigan Athletic	31 May 2017	29 July 2020	155	64	41	50	41.3	
Ipswich Town	2 March 2021	4 December 2021	44	13	17	14	29.5	
Chesterfield	10 February 2022	Present	258	126	59	73	48.8	
Total			973	428	247	298	44.0	

== Honours ==
=== Player ===
Burnley

- Football League Second Division runner-up: 1999–2000

Accrington Stanley

- Conference National: 2005–06

Individual

- Wolverhampton Wanderers Player of the Year: 1992–93

=== Manager ===
Sligo Rovers

- FAI Cup runner-up: 2009
- FAI Cup: 2010, 2011
- League of Ireland Cup: 2010

Chesterfield

- Football League Two: 2013–14
- National League: 2023–24
- Football League Trophy runner-up: 2013–14

Portsmouth

- EFL League Two: 2016–17

Wigan Athletic

- EFL League One: 2017–18

Individual

- Football League/EFL League Two Manager of the Month: August 2013, April 2017
- LMA League Two Manager of the Year: 2017
- EFL League One Manager of the Month: October 2017, March 2018, April 2018
- National League Manager of the Month: August 2022, January 2024
