= Vindheim =

Vindheim is a surname of Norwegian origin. Notable people with the surname include:

- Andreas Vindheim (born 1995), Norwegian footballer
- Rune Vindheim (born 1972), Norwegian footballer and manager
