= Andy Cooke =

Professional footballer

Personal information
- Full name: Andrew Roy Cooke
- Date of birth: 20 January 1974 (age 52)
- Place of birth: Shrewsbury, England
- Height: 6 ft 0 in (1.83 m)
- Position: Striker

Youth career
- 1991: Telford United

Senior career*
Years	Team	Apps	(Gls)
1992–1995	Newtown	80	(35)
1995–2000	Burnley	172	(51)
2000–2003	Stoke City	88	(21)
2003–2004	Busan I'Cons	42	(19)
2005–2006	Bradford City	37	(5)
2006	→ Darlington (loan)	14	(3)
2006–2008	Shrewsbury Town	48	(15)
2011–2012	Market Drayton Town		
Total		481	(149)
- * Club domestic league appearances and goals

Andrew Roy Cooke (born 20 January 1974) is an English former footballer, who played as a striker for Newtown, Burnley, Stoke City, Busan I'Cons (South Korea), Bradford City, Darlington and Shrewsbury Town.

== Career ==
Born in Shrewsbury, Shropshire, Cooke was once a trainee at local side Telford United. He started his footballing career at Welsh semi-professional club Newtown. He was a prolific goalscorer in the Welsh Premier League which attracted the attention of several Football League clubs. Burnley signed Cooke in 1995, and he made 172 league appearances and scored 51 goals for them, forging a partnership with Andy Payton.

In December 2000 he joined the club he grew up supporting, Stoke City, for a fee of £300,000. He spent two and a half years at the Britannia Stadium, making 102 appearances and scoring 23 goals. On 19 July 2003, he moved to South Korean K-League club Busan I'Cons, along with fellow countryman Jamie Cureton.

On his return to England in January 2005, Cooke signed for Bradford City, playing 37 games and scoring five goals. He had a three-month spell on loan at Darlington before signing for Shrewsbury Town for free on 27 July 2006.

Cooke made his Shrewsbury debut on 26 August 2006 as a half-time substitute for Kelvin Langmead in a 1–0 defeat at Bristol Rovers. He started the next match, a 1–0 defeat to Lincoln City, and in his third match scored a hat-trick in a 3–0 win against Stockport County.

On 1 January 2007, Cooke scored his 100th professional goal during a 4–2 win over Stockport County. He also scored a hat-trick in that game, giving him the distinction of having achieved this feat both home and away against Stockport County in the 2006–07 season. Having failed to score for three months, Cooke came on as a substitute in the League Two playoff semi-final second leg to score both goals in a 2–1 aggregate victory over MK Dons.

At the end of the season, Cooke was offered a new one-year contract, but warned by manager Gary Peters that he would not be guaranteed a regular place in the first-team squad. Cooke decided to stay with Shrewsbury Town, and Peters went on to say that it would not surprise him if he ended the season as the team's top goalscorer.

Cooke scored twice in Shrewsbury Town's 2007–08 opening-day victory at Lincoln City, but sustained a hamstring injury in a League Cup fixture against Colchester United three days later. He resumed full training in early December, and his comeback was complete when he returned to first-team action on 26 December 2007. Although he only played the first half against Stockport County, Cooke marked his return with a goal, his seventh in his last three games against that opposition.

On 31 January 2008, Cooke was set to sign a one-and-a-half-year contract with Notts County, but the deal fell through because of a "late hitch".

On 15 April 2008, Cooke was released by Shrewsbury Town by mutual consent, after being informed his contract would not be renewed. He trained with Kidderminster Harriers, but wanted to continue playing in the Football League; however, when no club came in for him, he announced his retirement as a player on 28 August 2008.

He came out of retirement in November 2011 to sign for his local club Market Drayton Town as a Director of Football and also as a player.

== Personal life ==
Cooke grew up supporting Stoke City. After retiring from playing Cooke began working in the Group Insurance industry.

== Career statistics ==
Appearances and goals by club, season and competition
Club	Season	League			FA Cup		League Cup		Other		Total	
Club	Season	Division	Apps	Goals	Apps	Goals	Apps	Goals	Apps	Goals	Apps	Goals
Burnley	1995–96	Second Division	23	5	1	0	0	0	4 (Note: Appearances in Football League Trophy)	0	28	5
Burnley	1996–97	Second Division	31	13	3	0	3	1	0	0	37	14
Burnley	1997–98	Second Division	34	16	2	1	2	1	5	2	43	20
Burnley	1998–99	Second Division	36	9	0	0	1	1	1	0	38	10
Burnley	1999–2000	Second Division	37	7	4	1	0	0	0	0	41	8
Burnley	2000–01	First Division	11	2	0	0	4	3	—		15	5
Burnley	Total		172	51	10	2	10	6	10	2	202	57
Stoke City	2000–01	Second Division	22	6	0	0	0	0	5 (Note: Three appearances and goal in Football League Trophy two appearances in Second Division play-offs)	1	27	7
Stoke City	2001–02	Second Division	35	9	4	1	1	0	3 (Note: Appearances in Second Division play-offs)	0	43	10
Stoke City	2002–03	First Division	31	6	0	0	1	0	—		32	6
Stoke City	Total		88	21	4	1	2	0	8	1	102	23
Busan I'Cons	2003	K-League	22	13	1	1	—		—		23	14
Busan I'Cons	2004	K-League	20	6	0	0	—		—		20	6
Busan I'Cons	Total		42	19	1	1	—		—		43	20
Bradford City	2004–05	League One	20	4	0	0	0	0	0	0	20	4
Bradford City	2005–06	League One	17	1	2	1	2	0	2	0	23	2
Bradford City	Total		37	5	2	1	2	0	2	0	43	6
Darlington (loan)	2005–06	League Two	14	3	0	0	0	0	0	0	14	3
Shrewsbury Town	2006–07	League Two	34	10	2	0	0	0	3 (Note: Appearances in League Two play-offs)	2	39	12
Shrewsbury Town	2007–08	League Two	14	5	0	0	1	0	0	0	15	5
Shrewsbury Town	Total		48	15	2	0	1	0	3	2	54	17
Career total			401	114	19	5	15	6	23	5	458	130

== Honours ==
Stoke City

- Football League Second Division play-offs: 2002
