= Damian Matthew =

English footballer and manager

Personal information
- Date of birth: 23 September 1970 (age 56)
- Place of birth: Islington, London, England
- Height: 5 ft 11 in (1.80 m)
- Position: Midfielder

Youth career
- Chelsea

Senior career*
Years	Team	Apps	(Gls)
1989–1994	Chelsea	21	(0)
1992	→ Luton Town (loan)	5	(0)
1994–1996	Crystal Palace	24	(1)
1996	→ Bristol Rovers (loan)	8	(0)
1996–1998	Burnley	45	(6)
1998–1999	Northampton Town	2	(0)
Total		77	(7)

International career
1989–1991	England U21	9	(0)
- * Club domestic league appearances and goals

Damian Matthew (born 23 September 1970) is an English football coach, former professional footballer and television pundit, who was last a first-team coach at Rangers.

As a player, he was a midfielder from 1989 until 1999, notably in the Premier League with Chelsea and Crystal Palace. He also played in the Football League for Luton Town, Bristol Rovers, Burnley and Northampton Town.

After his playing days were over, Matthew was briefly a pundit for Chelsea TV. He has also worked on the coaching staff at Chelsea, Crystal Palace, Charlton Athletic, Wolverhampton Wanderers, Southend United, Welling United and Queens Park Rangers.

== Playing career ==
He began his professional playing career as a midfielder for Chelsea in the early 1990s, playing 21 league games and being issued with the number 8 when FA Premier League squad numbers were introduced in 1993–94. He next played for Crystal Palace but once again his first team chances were limited.

He then played for Burnley and Northampton Town before retiring from playing professionally in 1999 at the age of 29, due to injury.

== Coaching career ==
Matthew is a UEFA qualified coach and, after retiring as a player, became a scout for Wolverhampton Wanderers, before returning to Chelsea as a Youth Development Officer. In 2003, he became assistant manager of Bedford Town.

He joined Charlton Athletic in 2006, as the U18s coach, and, in 2007, he shared this role with coaching at Maidstone United. He became Charlton's Reserve Development Coach in 2008, before later also becoming Academy Development Coach in 2010. In January 2011, he was promoted to first-team coach by new manager Chris Powell. Matthew maintained his place through the departures of Powell, José Riga and Bob Peeters, but he was sacked on 24 October 2015 at the same time as his final manager, Guy Luzon, was relieved of his duties.

Matthew joined Welling United as first-team coach in April 2016, under manager Mark Goldberg. He left the club on 14 September 2016, after only 10 matches of the 2016-17 season.

In January 2022 he joined Millwall FC's Youth Academy as Head of Coaching, taking over from Kenny Brown On 18 June 2022, Matthew was appointed assistant coach at Queens Park Rangers, under Michael Beale. However, five months later he left the club alongside Beale to join Scottish Premiership side Rangers.

== Honours ==
Crystal Palace

- Football League First Division: 1993–94
