= Michael Devenney =

English footballer

Personal information
- Full name: Michael Paul Devenney
- Date of birth: 8 February 1980 (age 46)
- Place of birth: Bolton, England
- Height: 5 ft 8 in (1.73 m)
- Position: Defender

Senior career*
Years	Team	Apps	(Gls)
1997–2001	Burnley	0	(0)
2000	→ Leigh RMI (loan)	4	(0)
- * Club domestic league appearances and goals

Michael Paul Devenney (born 8 February 1980) in Bolton, England, is an English retired professional footballer who played as a defender for Burnley in the Football League.

He made his debut on 8 December 1998, in the 1–0 defeat against local rivals Preston North End in the Football League Trophy Northern Section 1st Round, coming on as a substitute in the 74th minute replacing Rune Vindheim.

In September 2000, he joined Football Conference side Leigh RMI on a one-month loan deal and made five appearances for the club.
