= Carl Smith (footballer) =

English footballer

Personal information
- Full name: Carl Smith
- Date of birth: 15 July 1977 (age 49)
- Place of birth: England
- Position: Full back

Senior career*
Years	Team	Apps	(Gls)
1997–1999	Burnley	11	(0)
	Worksop Town	?	(?)
	Burton Albion	?	(?)
- * Club domestic league appearances and goals

Carl Smith (born 15 July 1977) was an English professional footballer who played as a full back. He played eleven matches in the Football League for Burnley.
