= Mike Williams (footballer, born 1969) =

English footballer

Personal information
- Full name: Michael Anthony Williams
- Date of birth: 21 November 1969 (age 56)
- Place of birth: Bradford, England
- Position: Forward

Senior career*
Years	Team	Apps	(Gls)
1990–1991	Maltby Main	?	(?)
1991–1997	Sheffield Wednesday	23	(1)
1992–1993	→ Halifax Town (loan)	9	(1)
1996	→ Huddersfield Town (loan)	2	(0)
1997	→ Peterborough United (loan)	6	(0)
1997–1999	Burnley	16	(1)
1999	Oxford United	2	(0)
1999–2001	Halifax Town	3	(0)
2001–?	Worksop Town	?	(?)
- * Club domestic league appearances and goals as of 14 April 2007

Michael Anthony Williams (born 21 November 1969, in Bradford) is a professional footballer, who played for a number of teams during the 1990s, but is mostly remembered for his time at Sheffield Wednesday.
