= Steve Blatherwick =

English former footballer who played as a defender from 1991 to 2006

Personal information
- Full name: Steven Scott Blatherwick
- Date of birth: 20 September 1973 (age 53)
- Place of birth: Hucknall, England
- Position: Central defender

Youth career
- 1989–1991: Notts County

Senior career*
Years	Team	Apps	(Gls)
1991–1992	Notts County	0	(0)
1992–1997	Nottingham Forest	10	(0)
1994	→ Wycombe Wanderers (loan)	2	(0)
1995	→ Hereford United (loan)	10	(1)
1997	→ Reading (loan)	7	(0)
1997–1998	Burnley	24	(0)
1998	→ Chesterfield (loan)	2	(0)
1998–2006	Chesterfield	223	(10)
2007–2009	Gainsborough Trinity	0	(0)
Total		278	(11)

Managerial career
- 2009: Gainsborough Trinity (caretaker)
- * Club domestic league appearances and goals

Steven Scott Blatherwick (born 20 September 1973) is an English football coach and former footballer

He played as a defender from 1991 to 2006. He spent much of his career playing for Chesterfield; however, he had previously played in the Premier League with Nottingham Forest. He also played in the Football League with Notts County, Wycombe Wanderers, Hereford United, Reading and Burnley. He retired from the game at the age of 32, on medical advice after suffering a back injury. He later became a coach at non-league club Gainsborough Trinity and briefly managed the club in a caretaker capacity before leaving the game to set up his own sports management company. He is now a director of Harwick Sports Group Limited

== Playing career ==
He started his career at Notts County but did not make a first team appearance for the Magpies. In August 1992, he made the short trip across the River Trent to Nottingham Forest. During a five-year spell at the City Ground he started 10 league matches and had spells on loan at Wycombe Wanderers, Hereford United and Reading.

In July 1997 he signed for Burnley for a £150,000 fee. But just over a year later he was loaned to Chesterfield, making the move permanent in December 1998 for a fee of £50,000. He was to spend the rest of his career at Saltergate and helped them win promotion to Division Two in 2001. He retired from playing in October 2006 at the age of 33. He had a testimonial match with former club Nottingham Forest, in which Chesterfield won 1–0 thanks to a goal by veteran striker Wayne Allison.

== Coaching career ==
In 2007 Blatherwick joined former Chesterfield teammate Dave Reeves on the coaching staff at Gainsborough Trinity, with new manager Steve Charles installing Reeves as Assistant Manager, and Blatherwick as a Coach. He was also registered as a makeshift player but had not been named on any squad sheet due to the injury problems that caused his retirement. In August 2009, following the dismissal of Steve Charles, Blatherwick and Reeves were appointed joint caretaker managers, but following the completion of one game in this role, the pair departed the club. Steve continued to study and gained his 'A and B' licence coaching badges. He also gained qualifications as an advanced personal trainer, sports therapist and nutritional adviser. He passed his FA licence agent examination in September 2011 and is studying Sports Psychology.

== Personal life ==
Blatherwick now lives and works in Nottingham and Manchester, where he has set up his own sports management company called "Elevate Sports Management"

His nephew Jack Blatherwick is a cricketer who has played for Nottinghamshire and Lancashire.

== Honours ==
Individual

- PFA Team of the Year: 2000–01 Third Division
