= Marco Gentile (footballer) =

Dutch footballer

Personal information
- Full name: Marco Gentile
- Date of birth: 24 August 1968 (age 58)
- Place of birth: The Hague, Netherlands
- Position: Central defender

Youth career
- VVP

Senior career*
Years	Team	Apps	(Gls)
1987–1991	FC Den Haag	72	(2)
1991–1995	ADO Den Haag	93	(1)
1995–1997	MVV	41	(1)
1997	Burnley	0	(0)
1997–1999	Volendam	41	(4)
1999–2000	Willem II	20	(0)
2000	Dumbarton	2	(0)
2000–2001	Willem II	0	(0)
Total		269	(8)
- * Club domestic league appearances and goals

Marco Gentile (born 24 August 1968) is a Dutch retired footballer who played as a central defender.

== Career ==
A tough-tackling defender, Gentile is related to Italian World Cup winner Claudio Gentile. Born in The Hague, he started playing football at local amateur side VVP before joining professional outfit FC Den Haag. He became infamous for breaking PSV and Brazil striker Romário's leg which made him miss the 1990 FIFA World Cup in Italy. In 1995 he controversially moved to MVV on a free.

He was brought to the UK by Adrian Heath to join Burnley in the Football League in 1997, but when Heath left Gentile was disregarded by successor Chris Waddle and left the club after only one competitive, cup, match. After a spell back in the Netherlands with Volendam, he joined Willem II in summer 1999 and played in the UEFA Champions League with them.

He also had a short spell at Scottish club Dumbarton.

After retiring as a player, Gentile worked for Haarlem as an assistant to manager Jan Zoutman, for ADO Den Haag as a youth coach and for Excelsior, Sparta and RKC as a video analist. He also was an assistant to the manager at Excelsior.
