= Gerry Harrison (footballer) =

English footballer

Personal information
- Full name: Gerald Randall Harrison
- Date of birth: 15 April 1972 (age 54)
- Place of birth: Lambeth, England
- Height: 1.75 m (5 ft 9 in)
- Position: Midfielder

Youth career
- 1989–1990: Watford

Senior career*
Years	Team	Apps	(Gls)
1990–1991	Watford	9	(0)
1991–1993	Bristol City	38	(1)
1992	→ Cardiff City (loan)	10	(1)
1993–1994	→ Hereford United (loan)	6	(0)
1994	Huddersfield Town	0	(0)
1994–1998	Burnley	124	(3)
1998–2000	Sunderland	0	(0)
1998–1999	→ Luton Town (loan)	14	(0)
1999	→ Hull City (loan)	8	(0)
1999	→ Hull City (loan)	3	(0)
2000	→ Burnley (loan)	0	(0)
2000	Halifax Town	9	(1)
200x–200x	Prestwich Heys		
2001–2004	Leigh RMI	77	(1)
2004	York City	3	(0)
2004–2005	Northwich Victoria	6	(0)
2005–2008	Hyde United	87	(8)

International career
1987	England U15	2	(0)

Managerial career
- 2024–2025: Nelson
- * Club domestic league appearances and goals

Gerald Randall Harrison (born 15 April 1972 in Lambeth) is an English former professional footballer who played as a midfielder in the Football League for Watford, Bristol City, Cardiff City, Hereford United, Burnley, Sunderland, Luton Town, Hull City and Halifax Town. He went on to play non-league football.

== Club career ==
Harrison was raised in West Norwood, Lambeth, training with local side Crystal Palace as a boy. He was spotted by Watford scout, Dick East, whilst playing for South London Schools against Brighton Schools and subsequently began training with the club. He did not sign for Watford as a youth trainee at 16, opting to stay at school another year to improve his GCSE results. He signed on as a youth trainee a year later, making his professional league debut as a 17 year-old for the Hornets in a 3–3 draw with Ipswich Town in the Second Division on 7 April 1990. He made two further appearances in the 1989–90 season after the youth team manager, Colin Lee, had been promoted to first team manager and there were injuries to first team regulars, Lee Richardson, Gary Porter and Kenny Jackett in midfield. He expected to feature more for the first team in the 1990–91 season but struggled to make an impact, only making five starts and two substitute appearances out of position at full back.

He moved to fellow Second Division side Bristol City for the 1991–92 season, but was used sparingly during his first season with the club. In January 1992, he joined Fourth Division side Cardiff City on a two-month loan deal to gain some first team action. He made his debut for the club in a dominant 4–0 win over Chesterfield. He became a regular during the 1992–93 season as Bristol City finished in 15th place in the newly-restructured second-tier, the First Division, following the introduction of the Premier League.

Harrison was on the move again soon after, signing for newly-promoted First Division side Burnley for the 1994–95 season making his debut, at right back, in the 3–0 defeat to Oldham Athletic. He was in and out of the side in his first season as Burnley were relegated back to the Second Division at the first attempt under Jimmy Mullen. He became more of a regular in the side when Adrian Heath took charge in March 1996, but not at right back or midfield, Heath moved him into a three man defence. He had his best period at the club under Heath during 1996–97 as Burnley finished 9th, but again lost his place in the side when new manager, Chris Waddle, was appointed for the 1997–98 season. After seven games he was brought back into the side and didn't miss another game, other than through injury or suspension, as Burnley battled against relegation to the Third Division.

Harrison's contract expired at Burnley in the summer of 1998 and he subsequently joined First Division side Sunderland who were managed by Peter Reid, having fought off competition from Luton Town.

== International career ==
Harrison represented England at under-15 Schoolboys level, making his debut on 27 February 1987 in a 3–1 win over Northern Ireland in the Victory Shield. He was due to play against West Germany at Wembley Stadium, but remained an unused substitute. However, he did play at Anfield two days later in the reverse fixture against the Germans in what proved to be his final appearance. He was due to play against France at Bramall Lane, but picked up an ankle injury playing for his school and he couldn't regain his place in the side after that.

== Coaching career ==
In January 2002, he joined the community team at Burnley as the regional manager for the Skipton & Keighley areas to work alongside two former teammates in Vince Overson and Dino Maamria. In June 2016, he was appointed as first team coach at Nelson of the North West Counties Football League Premier Division, assisting his former Burnley teammate, Phil Eastwood, who was appointed as manager.

On 2 December 2024, he was promoted to manager following Ripley's departure from the club, despite the club being in second position. He initially took charge as caretaker boss for the 4–2 win over Ashton Town on 30 November.
