= Ian Duerden =

English footballer

Personal information
- Full name: Ian Christopher Duerden
- Date of birth: 27 March 1978 (age 48)
- Place of birth: Burnley, England
- Height: 5 ft 10 in (1.78 m)
- Position: Striker

Senior career*
Years	Team	Apps	(Gls)
1996–1998	Burnley	1	(1)
1996	→ Glentoran (loan)	14	(2)
1996	→ Bamber Bridge (loan)	12	(8)
1997	→ Southport (loan)	12	(1)
1998	→ Telford United (loan)	18	(7)
1998	Halifax Town	2	(0)
1998–2001	Doncaster Rovers	54	(16)
2000	→ Kingstonian (loan)	4	(2)
2001	Kingstonian	12	(3)
2001–2002	Barrow	22	(7)
2002	Hucknall Town	14	(6)
- * Club domestic league appearances and goals

Ian Christopher Duerden (born 27 March 1978) is an English former professional association footballer who played as a centre forward.

At Burnley he played under Jimmy Mullen, Adrian Heath, Chris Waddle and Glen Roeder over a 6-year period from being a youth team player and represented England under 18's in two friendly internationals. This stint was also followed very closely by the BBC reporter Peter Stevenson who did a monthly documentary on the lifestyle of a Y.T.S footballer, following Duerden 24 hours a day for two years. After making one appearance for Burnley in the Championship, plus loan spells at Glentoran, Bamber Bridge, Southport and Telford, Duerden moved to Halifax Town at the beginning of the 1998 season.

After only a couple of appearances, he fell out of favour and was signed by Doncaster Rovers. He spent October and November 2000 on loan to Kingstonian helping them reach the 4th round of the FA Cup.

Unhappy with a lack of first team appearances for Rovers, in January 2001 Duerden was sold to Kingstonian. He then moved to Barrow and later to Hucknall Town where he scored on his debut. Here his professional career ended prematurely due to a series of injuries throughout the years.

Despite rumours that he had signed for Altrincham, Duerden went on to work in the fire service whom he also played football for, representing them at the England level.
