= Craig Mawson =

English footballer and coach

Personal information
- Full name: Craig John Mawson
- Date of birth: 16 May 1979 (age 47)
- Place of birth: Keighley, England
- Height: 6 ft 2 in (1.88 m)
- Position: Goalkeeper

Team information
- Current team: Manchester United (Goalkeeper coach)

Senior career*
Years	Team	Apps	(Gls)
1997–2001	Burnley	0	(0)
2000	→ Lincoln City (loan)	0	(0)
2001	Halifax Town	9	(0)
2001–2004	Morecambe	123	(0)
2004	→ Oldham Athletic (loan)	4	(0)
2004–2006	Hereford United	36	(0)
2006–2008	Halifax Town	46	(0)
2008–2010	Droylsden	53	(0)
2010	Hyde	6	(0)
Total		268	(0)

Managerial career
- 2010–2019: Burnley (academy)
- * Club domestic league appearances and goals

Craig Mawson (born 16 May 1979) is an English former professional footballer who was most recently a goalkeeping coach for Premier League club Manchester United.

== Career ==
=== Burnley ===
Mawson started his career at Burnley in a full-time position. In December 2015, he was awarded the FA Goalkeeping Coach of the Year 2015 award.

=== Lincoln City ===
In September 2000, Lincoln City's manager Phil Stant signed Mawson on-loan as cover for his first-choice keeper Alan Marriott. Whilst the loan was extended to a second month, Mawson would remain an unused substitute in each of Lincoln's nine league games during this period before returning to Burnley.

=== Other clubs ===
Mawson has also played for Morecambe and Oldham Athletic. Whilst at Christie Park he was voted Player of the Year by the supporters for the 2002-03 season, when he notably saved two penalties in the semi-final of the Conference playoffs. However the team failed to progress to the final.

Following the liquidation of Halifax Town, Mawson signed a deal with Conference North team Droylsden.

=== Hyde ===
On 2 July 2010, he signed for Droylsden's rivals Hyde. He was due to make his Hyde debut on 17 July 2010 against Manchester City Reserves, but unexpectedly flew out to Singapore and had to be replaced by Brynn Hindley.

=== Return to Burnley ===
On 1 September 2010 Mawson signed for Burnley as a coach for the youth team.

Mawson was included in the reserve team on 27 October 2010 against Macclesfield and was a regular starter for the reserve team.
