= Graham Branch =

English footballer

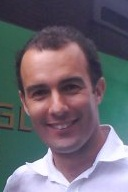
- Branch on the day of his Burnley testimonial in 2007

Personal information
- Full name: Graham Branch
- Date of birth: 12 February 1972 (age 54)
- Place of birth: Liverpool, England
- Height: 6 ft 2 in (1.88 m)
- Positions: Left-back; left midfielder

Senior career*
| Years | Team | Apps | (Gls) |
| 1990-1991 | Heswall | | |
| 1991–1998 | Tranmere Rovers | 102 | (10) |
| 1992–1993 | → Bury (loan) | 4 | (1) |
| 1997–1998 | → Wigan Athletic (loan) | 3 | (0) |
| 1998–1999 | Stockport County | 14 | (3) |
| 1999–2007 | Burnley | 264 | (17) |
| 2007–2008 | Accrington Stanley | 22 | (0) |
| 2008 | Cammell Laird | | |
| 2008–2010 | Colwyn Bay | | |
| Total | | 409 | (31) |
- * Club domestic league appearances and goals

Graham Branch (born 12 February 1972) is a former professional footballer.

== Playing career ==
Branch was born in Liverpool, England. A childhood Liverpool fan, he started his footballing career across the River Mersey with Heswall and then Tranmere Rovers. Having made 109 appearances for them, with loan deals at Bury and Wigan Athletic along the way, he was released on a free transfer to Stockport County for the beginning of the 1998–99 season, and quickly arrived at Burnley in January 1999, signed by the colourful manager Stan Ternent, following a falling-out with then Stockport manager, Gary Megson.

Once described by Ternent as a Premiership-standard player, his inability to hold down a regular position either as a left-winger, left-sided or central defender, or striker, saw him never play there. He played more than 200 games for the club. His unpopularity with some supporters was balanced with him becoming something of a cult figure, earning him regular chants of "Graham di Branchio," (in reference to the football chant given to Italian footballer Paolo Di Canio), in an effort to boost his confidence and let his more prominent abilities such as pace and height come to the fore.

Branch's contract was set to expire at the end of the 2004–05 season before he earned a one-year extension in April 2005. The 2005–06 season held even more promise for the player after his hard work and commitment paid off after he was offered a new one-year extension to his current deal. Although he only scored two goals he played a large role in many victories due to his skill and crossing abilities. The 2006–07 was widely expected to be his last with Burnley and he spent it as a little-used substitute or squad player. However, the season was dedicated as an entire testimonial season for him, culminating on 7 May 2007, when 1,809 fans turned out at Turf Moor to say goodbye to him. In his testimonial, the current Burnley side played a 'Branch XI'. Although no official announcement had been made by that stage, Branch's departure had been confirmed by Steve Cotterill in interviews leading up to this testimonial match. His departure was confirmed on 8 May 2007.

In March 2010 he was forced to retire from football after suffering a serious eye injury whilst playing for Colwyn Bay.
