= Mark Robertson (soccer) =

Australian soccer player (born 1977)

Personal information
- Full name: Mark William Robertson
- Date of birth: 6 April 1977 (age 49)
- Place of birth: Sydney, Australia
- Height: 1.80 m (5 ft 11 in)
- Positions: Central midfielder; centre back

Youth career
- 1993–1994: Eastern Suburbs

Senior career*
Years	Team	Apps	(Gls)
1994	Stanmore Hawks	1	(1)
1994–1997	Marconi Stallions	23	(0)
1997–1999	Burnley	36	(1)
1999–2000	Wollongong Wolves	12	(0)
2000–2001	Swindon Town	10	(1)
2001–2003	Dundee	25	(0)
2003–2004	St Johnstone	19	(2)
2004–2005	Stockport County	32	(1)
2006–2007	Perth Glory	2	(0)
2007	FC Sopron	?	(?)
2007–2008	Sydney FC	3	(0)
2008–2009	Sydney United	11	(0)

International career^{‡}
1997	Australia U20		
2000	Australia U23		
2001	Australia	1	(0)
Medal record
Representing Australia
Men's Association football
AFC–OFC Challenge Cup
Runner-up	2001 Japan
- * Club domestic league appearances and goals as of 22 September 2012 ‡ National team caps and goals as of 15 January 2008

Mark William Robertson (born 6 April 1977) is an Australian former soccer player who played in Australian, English and Scottish leagues. He played at international level for Australia.

== Playing career ==
=== Club career ===
Robertson signed with Burnley in 1997 after being noticed playing for Australia at the 1997 FIFA World Youth Championship.

In December 2007, Robertson signed with Sydney FC as cover for Adam Casey, out with a long-term injury.

=== International career ===
Robertson played one full international match for Australia in 2001.

== Personal life ==
Robertson was born in Sydney in 1977. His father, Alex, had emigrated from Scotland to play for Sydney City in the National Soccer League and eventually represented Australia eight times in non-official matches.

Robertson's son Alexander, who was born in Scotland whilst he played for Dundee, currently plays for Cardiff City and the Australian national football team.

== Career statistics ==
=== International ===
Australia
Year	Apps	Goals
2001	1	0
Total	1	0

== Honours ==
Australia

- AFC–OFC Challenge Cup: runner-up 2001
