= John Mullin (footballer) =

English footballer (born 1975)

Personal information
- Full name: John Michael Mullin
- Date of birth: 11 August 1975 (age 51)
- Place of birth: Bury, England
- Height: 6 ft 0 in (1.83 m)
- Position: Midfielder

Youth career
- ?–1992: Burnley

Senior career*
Years	Team	Apps	(Gls)
1992–1995	Burnley	18	(2)
1995–1999	Sunderland	36	(4)
1998	→ Preston North End (loan)	7	(0)
1998	→ Burnley (loan)	6	(0)
1999–2001	Burnley	75	(8)
2001–2006	Rotherham United	180	(12)
2006–2008	Tranmere Rovers	50	(5)
2008–2010	Accrington Stanley	32	(0)
Total		404	(31)
- * Club domestic league appearances and goals

John Michael Mullin (born 11 August 1975) is an English former professional footballer who played as a midfielder for clubs including Sunderland, Burnley, Rotherham United, Tranmere Rovers, and Accrington Stanley, and is the brother of former Accrington and Morecambe player Paul Mullin. He is now a member of the coaching staff at Manchester City U18s.

== Career ==
Mullin was born in Bury, Greater Manchester. His career began at Burnley, and has taken in spells at Sunderland (where he had the distinction of scoring the winning goal in a Premier League game against Manchester United in 1997, and the final goal at Roker Park in a 1–0 victory over Liverpool), a second spell at Burnley and Rotherham United. Mullin left Rotherham at the end of the 2005–06 season and joined the manager that brought him to the Millers, Ronnie Moore, at Tranmere Rovers on a two-year deal.

Whilst at Tranmere he had a reasonable season the first year but his second season on Merseyside brought injuries and subbed appearances. He was first choice centre-mid with Paul McLaren in his first year and netted 5 times. He scored a volley at home to Bristol City in the last minute in Tranmere's 1–0 win. He also scored against Yeovil Town, Northampton Town (twice) and Chesterfield.

After being released by Tranmere at the end of the 2007–08 season, Mullin was signed by Accrington Stanley on a one-year contract rolling into a second year. After retiring he joined Burnley's youth set up as a coach before moving onto Manchester City. He is now part of the Manchester City recruitment team.
