= Colin Carr-Lawton =

English footballer

Personal information
- Full name: Colin Carr-Lawton
- Date of birth: 5 September 1978 (age 48)
- Place of birth: South Shields, England
- Height: 5 ft 11 in (1.80 m)
- Position: Striker

Senior career*
Years	Team	Apps	(Gls)
1997–1999	Burnley	5	(0)
1998	→ Ethnikos (loan)	?	(?)
1999–2000	Berwick Rangers	7	(0)
2000	Whitby Town	6	(3)
Total		18	(3)
- * Club domestic league appearances and goals

Colin Carr-Lawton (born 5 September 1978) is an English former professional footballer who played as a striker. He played five matches in the Football League for Burnley, making his début in the 1–4 defeat to Grimsby Town on 22 November 1997.
