= Brad Maylett =

English footballer (born 1980)

Personal information
- Full name: Bradley Maylett
- Date of birth: 24 December 1980 (age 45)
- Place of birth: Manchester, England
- Height: 5 ft 11 in (1.80 m)
- Position: Midfielder

Senior career*
| Years | Team | Apps | (Gls) |
| 1998–2003 | Burnley | 45 | (0) |
| 2003 | → Swansea City (loan) | 6 | (0) |
| 2003–2005 | Swansea City | 49 | (5) |
| 2005 | → Boston United (loan) | 9 | (3) |
| 2005–2007 | Boston United | 59 | (1) |
| 2007 | → Chester City (loan) | 5 | (1) |
| 2007–2008 | Northwich Victoria | 13 | (0) |
| 2008 | Leigh Genesis | 27 | (5) |
| 2008–2009 | Fleetwood Town | 9 | (0) |
| 2009–2010 | Witton Albion | ? | (?) |
| 2010– | Rhyl | 0 | (0) |
- * Club domestic league appearances and goals as of 13:55, 8 June 2010 (UTC)

Bradley Maylett (born 24 December 1980) is an English footballer. He plays as a right winger.

== Playing career ==
Maylett started his career in 1998 at Burnley as a trainee making 45 league appearances. He joined Swansea City on loan on 15 March 2003, making six appearances. In June, he joined the club permanently for 250k. On his second debut for the club he scored a hat-trick in a 4–2 victory over Bury at Vetch Field. His first goal came just five minutes into the game.

On 18 March 2005 Maylett joined Boston United initially on loan, when he made nine appearances, scoring three goals, before signing on a permanent contract on 1 June. On 2 March 2007 he joined Chester City on loan making five appearances and scoring one goal. He left Boston in 2007, following the club's double relegation from League Two to the Conference North.

He signed a one-year contract with Conference National club Northwich Victoria on 16 July 2007.

In February 2008 Maylett signed for Leigh Genesis, then in the Conference North on a free transfer. He scored his first goal for the club in a 3–1 defeat to Hinckley United in March 2008. The club were relegated to the Northern Premier League Premier Division at the end of the season, and he started the 2008–09 season with Leigh. And after a total of 27 league appearances, with five goals, he moved to Fleetwood Town in the Conference North on 14 November 2008, making his debut as a second-half substitute the next day in a 2–1 away victory over Stafford Rangers. On 9 March 2009 he joined Witton Albion. After a year with Witton, he signed for Cymru Alliance club Rhyl on 7 June 2010. Having missed the early part of the season through injury, Maylett recovered to earn a Cymru Alliance player of the year award.
