= Phil Eastwood =

English footballer (born 1978)

Personal information
- Full name: Philip Eastwood
- Date of birth: 6 April 1978 (age 48)
- Place of birth: Blackburn, England
- Position: Striker

Team information
- Current team: Bamber Bridge

Youth career
- Blackburn Rovers
- 1994–1996: Burnley

Senior career*
| Years | Team | Apps | (Gls) |
| 1996–1999 | Burnley | 18 | (1) |
| 1996 | → Leek Town (loan) | ? | (?) |
| 1998 | → Telford United (loan) | ? | (?) |
| 1999 | → Kettering Town (loan) | ? | (?) |
| 1999–2001 | Morecambe | 74 | (31) |
| 2001–2002 | Southport | 13 | (2) |
| 2002–2006 | Stalybridge Celtic | 145 | (64) |
| 2005 | → Hyde United (loan) | 3 | (1) |
| 2005 | → Ashton United (loan) | 6 | (7) |
| 2006 | → Ashton United (loan) | 1 | (0) |
| 2006–2009 | Rossendale United | 122 | (67) |
| 2009– | Bamber Bridge | 12 | (22) |

Managerial career
- 2008–2009: Rossendale United (player-manager)
- 2016: Nelson
- * Club domestic league appearances and goals as of 21:11, 10 November 2009 (UTC)

Philip Eastwood (born 6 April 1978 in Blackburn) is an English former professional footballer who played in the Football League as a striker for Burnley.

== Career ==
Eastwood was born in Whalley and attended Pleckgate High School in Blackburn. As a schoolboy, he was with Blackburn Rovers before joining Burnley as a YTS trainee when he left school. While at Burnley he won a Pontins League Second Division winners' medal with the reserve team, had loan spells at non-league sides Leek Town, Telford United and Kettering Town, and made 16 first-team appearances, scoring once.

Released at the end of the 1998–99 season, he went on to play for Conference clubs Morecambe and Southport, then spent four seasons with Stalybridge Celtic. He scored 63 goals from 153 appearances in all competitions, and spent time on loan at Hyde United and Ashton United, before signing for Rossendale United in 2006. Over his three seasons with the club, he averaged 20 goals a season, was their leading scorer, and was player-manager from November 2008 to the end of the 2008–09 season, when he left the post by mutual consent after Rossendale finished bottom of the Northern Premier League Division One North. He then joined Bamber Bridge as a player.

In January 2009, Eastwood joined Preston North End as technical youth development officer, to work with the youngest players in the club's centre of excellence. In June 2016, he was appointed manager of North West Counties Football League side Nelson, with former Burnley teammate, Gerry Harrison, joining him as first team coach. His time at the club was very brief as the board decided to relinquish Eastwood of his duties in September 2016, following only one win in the first ten league games.
