= Lenny Johnrose =

English footballer (1969–2022)

- Johnrose with Burnley

Personal information
- Full name: Leonard Johnrose
- Date of birth: 29 November 1969
- Place of birth: Preston, Lancashire, England
- Date of death: 15 August 2022 (aged 52)
- Place of death: Lancashire, England
- Position: Defensive midfielder

Senior career*
Years	Team	Apps	(Gls)
1988–1992	Blackburn Rovers	42	(11)
1992	→ Preston North End (loan)	3	(1)
1992–1993	Hartlepool United	66	(11)
1993–1999	Bury	188	(20)
1999–2002	Burnley	71	(4)
2002	Burnley	6	(0)
2002–2003	Bury	6	(0)
2003–2004	Swansea City	40	(3)
2004	Burnley	7	(0)
Total		430	(50)
- * Club domestic league appearances and goals

Leonard Johnrose (29 November 1969 – 15 August 2022) was an English professional footballer who played for clubs including Burnley, Bury and Swansea City. He was a defensive midfielder.

== Career ==
Johnrose began his career at Blackburn Rovers as a young trainee, and also spent time on loan at Preston North End. During these spells he impressed to a level where he was signed for £50,000 by Hartlepool United. He went on to make over fifty appearances for the club, scoring eleven goals in the process. At the end of his contract, he was signed by Bury manager Stan Ternent who wanted to add some toughness to his central midfield.

Johnrose was a central character in Bury's rapid rise to the First Division. Ternent saw the midfielder as so important to his sides that he paid £225,000 to take Johnrose with him to his new club, Burnley. At the end of the 2002–03 season he was released on a free transfer, but re-signed for the club four months later on a week-to-week basis. Later he re-signed for another of his old clubs, Bury. After three months he again moved, this time to Swansea City.

Johnrose helped Swansea City avoid relegation from the Third Division out of the Football League, scoring three crucial goals that season. Two goals in one week in March helped earn an away draw at Kidderminster and a home victory against Oxford. His final goal for the club came on the final Saturday of the 2002–2003 season. Swansea City were playing Hull City, and needed to equal or better Exeter's result against Southend to preserve their league status. Johnrose poked home from close range from a Roberto Martinez free-kick early in the second half to put the Swans 3–2 up. The final score of 4–2 meant that the club preserved their league status at the expense of Exeter.

In the summer of 2003, Johnrose was offered a 12-month contract with Swansea, and started the 2003–2004 season in the unfamiliar role of centre-half. After recovering from a hamstring injury, he briefly became captain and reverted to his more familiar defensive central midfield role. Around Christmas 2003, a further 12-month contract extension at the end of that season was discussed, but when manager Brian Flynn left the club by mutual consent in March 2004, Johnrose had his contract paid up and left the Swans within two days.

Johnrose signed for Burnley for a third time on transfer deadline day (March 2004).

== Personal life ==
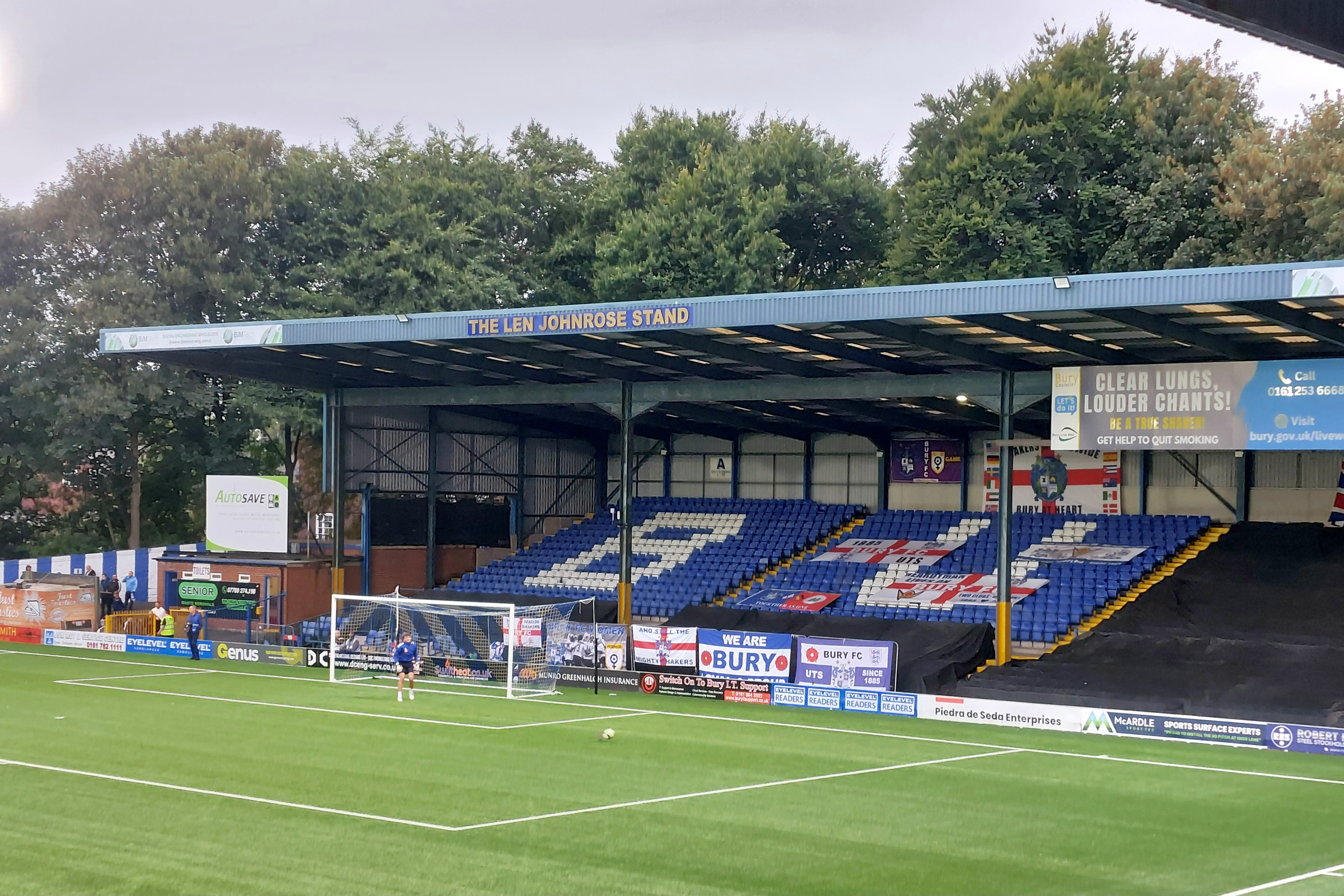
Len Johnrose Stand at Gigg Lane, Bury

Johnrose was married to Nadine and had three children: Chanel, Elizabeth and Patrick. After retiring from professional football, he became a teacher at St Silas Primary School in Blackburn. In March 2017, he was diagnosed with motor neurone disease.

When Johnrose went public about his condition and experience of motor neurone disease, Gareth Winston and Lee Trundle organised a charity match between teams of Swansea and Burnley "legends" which ended in a 10–7 win for the Swansea side. Former teammates of Johnrose from Bury and Burnley also played a charity match at Gigg Lane in July 2022; the game was attended by almost 3,000 supporters and proceeds went to the Len Johnrose Trust, a charity set up to raise awareness of MND. Johnrose died on 15 August 2022, at the age of 52. Following his death, the Manchester Road End at Bury's Gigg Lane stadium was renamed the Len Johnrose Stand in his honour.

== Honours ==
Bury

- Football League Second Division: 1996–97
