= Paul Weller (footballer) =

English footballer

Personal information
- Full name: Paul Anthony Weller
- Date of birth: 6 March 1975 (age 51)
- Place of birth: Brighton, England
- Height: 5 ft 8 in (1.73 m)
- Position: Midfielder

Senior career*
| Years | Team | Apps | (Gls) |
| 1993–2004 | Burnley | 252 | (11) |
| 2004 | Rochdale | 5 | (0) |
| 2004 | Leek Town | 2 | (0) |
| 2004 | Stalybridge Celtic | 2 | (0) |
| Total | | 261 | (11) |

Managerial career
- 2023–2024: Colne
- * Club domestic league appearances and goals

Paul Anthony Weller (born 6 March 1975) is an English former professional footballer. Born in Brighton, after playing at Worthing, he went on to play 250 matches in the Football League for Burnley and Rochdale.

Weller was forced to retire from playing in 2004 due to Crohn's disease. After retiring he worked as a coach at Burnley and Bury before starting his own business selling second-hand luxury cars.

In 2023 he was appointed manager of Colne. He resigned from the role in May 2024.
