= Rune Vindheim =

Norwegian footballer and manager (born 1972)

Rune André Vindheim
Personal information
- Date of birth: 15 May 1972 (age 54)
- Place of birth: Høyanger, Norway
- Height: 5 ft 11 in (1.80 m)
- Position: Defender

Youth career
- Førde

Senior career*
Years	Team	Apps	(Gls)
–1992	Førde		
1992	Brann	8	(0)
1993	Sogndal	5	(0)
1995–1996	Åsane	36	(0)
1998	Fana		
1998–1999	Burnley	8	(2)
1999–2000	Hartlepool United	7	(0)
2000	→ Førde (loan)		
2000	→ Haugesund (loan)	8	(0)
2001–2004	Fana		
2004–2008	Nymark		

International career
1992	Norway U21	1	(0)

Managerial career
- 2010: Fana (assistant)
- 2011–2016: Fana
- * Club domestic league appearances and goals

Rune André Vindheim (born 15 May 1972) is a retired Norwegian football player and manager who last managed Fana IL.

== Club career ==
Vindheim began his club career in the youth academy of Førde before being promoted to the senior team in the early 1990s. He joined Brann in the Tippeligaen in 1992 before moving to Sogndal in 1993. Due to a lack of playing time in the Tippeligaen, he made the step down to the Norwegian First Division in 1995 and joined Åsane.

He then moved to Fana IL in 1998, and he was sold to Burnley on 2 October 1998, playing eight league games, one FA Cup game and one Football League Trophy game. He was then sold to Hartlepool United on 16 September 1999, playing seven league games and one FA Cup game. In 2000, he was loaned to Førde and Haugesund before leaving on a permanent transfer back to Fana in 2001.

He spent another three years at Fana before joining Nymark in 2004, and he retired there in 2008.

== International career ==
Vindheim played one match for Norway U21 on 2 June 1992.

== Managing career ==
Vindheim became assistant coach of Fana IL ahead of the 2010 season. The season ended with relegation, and he was promoted to head coach. Vindheim and Fana subsequently won promotion from the 2011 Norwegian Third Division. He left the club in September 2016 after a head injury caused him to fall into a coma.

== Personal life ==
His son Andreas Vindheim is also a footballer.
