= 1995–96 Burnley F.C. season =

English football club season

Burnley
1995–96 season
- Chairman: Frank Teasdale
- Manager: Jimmy Mullen (until February 1996); Clive Middlemass (caretaker manager); Adrian Heath (from March 1996)
- Second Division: 17th
- FA Cup: First round
- League Cup: Second round
- Football League Trophy: Northern Quarter-final
- Top goalscorer: League: Kurt Nogan (20); All: Kurt Nogan (26)
- Highest home attendance: 10,613 v Hull City (16 September 1995)
- Lowest home attendance: 3,225 v Chester City (7 November 1995)
- Average home league attendance: 9,064
Home colours

The 1995–96 season was Burnley's first season in the third tier of English football.

== Appearances and goals ==
No.	Pos	Nat	Player	Total		Second Division		League Cup		FA Cup		FL Trophy	
No.	Pos	Nat	Player	Apps	Goals	Apps	Goals	Apps	Goals	Apps	Goals	Apps	Goals
	MF	(Scotland) SCO	Derek Adams	2	0	0+2	0	0+0	0	0+0	0	0+0	0
	GK	(England) ENG	Marlon Beresford	45	0	36+0	0	4+0	0	1+0	0	4+0	0
	DF	(England) ENG	Charlie Bishop (on loan)	9	0	9+0	0	0+0	0	0+0	0	0+0	0
	MF	(England) ENG	John Borland	4	0	1+0	0	2+0	0	0+1	0	0+0	0
	DF	(England) ENG	Chris Brass	11	0	7+2	0	0+0	0	0+0	0	2+0	0
	FW	(England) ENG	Andy Cooke	28	5	10+13	5	0+0	0	0+1	0	2+2	0
	DF	(England) ENG	Wayne Dowell	1	0	1+0	0	0+0	0	0+0	0	0+0	0
	MF	(England) ENG	David Eyres	48	7	39+3	6	3+0	0	1+0	1	2+0	0
	FW	(England) ENG	John Francis	29	2	4+18	2	0+3	0	0+1	0	0+3	0
	GK	(England) ENG	Jimmy Glass (on loan)	0	0	0+0	0	0+0	0	0+0	0	0+0	0
	DF	(England) ENG	Alan Harper	4	0	3+1	0	0+0	0	0+0	0	0+0	0
	DF	(England) ENG	Gerry Harrison	42	1	35+0	1	2+0	0	1+0	0	4+0	0
	MF	(England) ENG	Adrian Heath	9	0	5+2	0	1+0	0	0+0	0	1+0	0
	FW	(England) ENG	Ian Helliwell	4	0	3+1	0	0+0	0	0+0	0	0+0	0
	MF	(England) ENG	Jamie Hoyland	28	0	21+2	0	1+0	0	1+0	0	3+0	0
	MF	(England) ENG	Warren Joyce	50	5	42+1	5	4+0	0	0+0	0	3+0	0
	FW	(England) ENG	Paul Mahorn (on loan)	8	1	3+5	1	0+0	0	0+0	0	0+0	0
	DF	(Scotland) SCO	Paul McDonald (on loan)	11	1	8+1	1	0+0	0	0+0	0	2+0	0
	MF	(Scotland) SCO	Ted McMinn	11	0	7+3	0	0+0	0	0+0	0	0+1	0
	FW	(Wales) WAL	Kurt Nogan	55	26	46+0	20	4+0	3	1+0	0	4+0	3
	DF	(England) ENG	Gary Parkinson	36	0	29+0	0	4+0	0	1+0	0	2+0	0
	FW	(England) ENG	Nathan Peel	0	0	0+0	0	0+0	0	0+0	0	0+0	0
	DF	(Republic of Ireland) IRL	John Pender	2	0	1+0	0	1+0	0	0+0	0	0+0	0
	FW	(England) ENG	Tony Philliskirk	11	1	7+1	1	3+0	0	0+0	0	0+0	0
	MF	(England) ENG	Franny Powell	0	0	0+0	0	0+0	0	0+0	0	0+0	0
	MF	(England) ENG	Adrian Randall	19	0	12+3	0	2+0	0	1+0	0	1+0	0
	FW	(England) ENG	Liam Robinson	17	2	11+5	2	0+0	0	0+0	0	0+1	0
	GK	(Wales) WAL	Wayne Russell	10	0	10+0	0	0+0	0	0+0	0	0+0	0
	MF	(England) ENG	Paul Smith	10	0	3+7	0	0+0	0	0+0	0	0+0	0
	FW	(England) ENG	Peter Swan	39	5	31+1	5	2+0	0	1+0	0	4+0	0
	MF	(England) ENG	Steve Thompson	18	0	18+0	0	0+0	0	0+0	0	0+0	0
	DF	(England) ENG	Chris Vinnicombe	44	2	35+0	2	4+0	0	1+0	0	4+0	0
	MF	(England) ENG	Paul Weller	28	1	24+1	1	1+0	0	0+0	0	2+0	0
	DF	(England) ENG	Mark Winstanley	53	3	45+0	3	3+0	0	1+0	0	4+0	0

== Transfers ==
=== In ===
Pos	Player	From	Fee	Date
FW	(England) Andy Cooke	Newtown	Undisclosed	1 May 1995
FW	(England) Peter Swan	Plymouth Argyle	£200k	4 August 1995
DF	(Scotland) Paul McDonald	Southampton	Loan	15 September 1995
GK	(England) Jimmy Glass	Crystal Palace	Loan	1 February 1996
DF	(England) Charlie Bishop	Barnsley	Loan	28 March 1996
FW	(England) Paul Mahorn	Tottenham Hotspur	Loan	28 March 1996

=== Out ===
Pos	Player	To	Fee	Date
	(England) Tony McCluskey		Released	31 May 1995
DF	(England) Steve Davis	Luton Town	£750k	13 July 1995
MF	(England) John Mullin	Sunderland	£40k	12 August 1995
DF	(Republic of Ireland) John Pender	Wigan Athletic	£30k	21 August 1995
MF	(England) Franny Powell	Rochdale	Released	18 September 1995
FW	(England) Tony Philliskirk	Carlisle United	Loan	23 October 1995
FW	(England) Nathan Peel	Mansfield Town	Loan	27 October 1995
DF	(England) Alan Harper	Cardiff City	Loan	24 November 1995
FW	(England) Tony Philliskirk	Cardiff City	£60k	6 December 1995
MF	(England) Adrian Randall	York City	£140k	27 December 1995
FW	(England) Nathan Peel	Doncaster Rovers	Loan	23 February 1996
DF	(England) Wayne Dowell	Carlisle United	Loan	29 March 1996

== Matches ==
=== Second Division ===
12 August 1995

Burnley	2–1	Rotherham United
Eyres 25' (pen.); Philliskirk 39'	(Report)	Goater 10'

Turf Moor, Burnley
Attendance: 10,478

19 August 1995

Stockport County	0–0	Burnley
	(Report)

Edgeley Park, Stockport
Attendance: 8,463

26 August 1995

Burnley	1–0	Brentford
Nogan 11'	(Report)

Turf Moor, Burnley
Attendance: 9,586

29 August 1995

Bristol Rovers	1–0	Burnley
Taylor 49'	(Report)

Memorial Stadium, Bristol
Attendance: 5,646

6 September 1995

Burnley	1–1	Walsall
Joyce 90'	(Report)	Lightbourne 77'

Turf Moor, Burnley
Attendance: 8,778

9 September 1995

Carlisle United	2–0	Burnley
Aspinall; Conway	(Report)

Brunton Park, Carlisle
Attendance: 7,318

12 September 1995

York City	1–1	Burnley
Barnes 71'	(Report)	Cooke 38'

Bootham Crescent, York
Attendance: 4,684

16 September 1995

Burnley	2–1	Hull City
Nogan 40'; Allison 89' (o.g.)	(Report)	Fewings 90'

Turf Moor, Burnley
Attendance: 10,613

23 September 1995

Chesterfield	4–2	Burnley
Hewitt; Lormor; Morris; Robinson	(Report)	Nogan 17'; Eyres 44' (pen.)

Saltergate, Chesterfield
Attendance: 4,933

30 September 1995

Burnley	3–0	Swansea City
Nogan 15'; Joyce 53'; Eyres 79'	(Report)

Turf Moor, Burnley
Attendance: 8,068

7 October 1995

Burnley	1–1	Wycombe Wanderers
Joyce 40'	(Report)	Williams 64'

Turf Moor, Burnley
Attendance: 8,029

14 October 1995

Bournemouth	0–2	Burnley
	(Report)	Vinnicombe 6'; Nogan 78'

Dean Court, Bournemouth
Attendance: 4,954

21 October 1995

Burnley	3–0	Brighton & Hove Albion
Eyres 4'; Swan 33'; Nogan 36'	(Report)

Turf Moor, Burnley
Attendance: 9,016

28 October 1995

Bradford City	2–2	Burnley
Hamilton; Mitchell	(Report)	Harrison 24'; Swan 86'

Valley Parade, Bradford
Attendance: 8,356

31 October 1995

Peterborough United	0–2	Burnley
	(Report)	McDonald 11'; Swan 33'

London Road, Peterborough
Attendance: 4,737

16 September 1995

Burnley	3–4	Notts County
Nogan 3' 85'; Cooke 69'	(Report)	Arkins; Baraclough; Devlin

Turf Moor, Burnley
Attendance: 10,511

18 November 1995

Shrewsbury Town	3–0	Burnley
Evans; Scott	(Report)

Gay Meadow, Shrewsbury
Attendance: 3,914

25 November 1995

Burnley	2–2	Wrexham
Nogan 59'; Joyce 65'	(Report)	Skinner; Ward

Turf Moor, Burnley
Attendance: 8,710

2 December 1995

Burnley	2–0	Carlisle United
Nogan 38' 57'	(Report)

Turf Moor, Burnley
Attendance: 8,297

9 December 1995

Burnley	2–2	Chesterfield
Nogan 21' 81'	(Report)	Davies; Lormor

Turf Moor, Burnley
Attendance: 8,459

16 December 1995

Swansea City	2–4	Burnley
Hurst; Torpey	(Report)	Eyres 32'; Nogan 54'; Cooke 75' 87'

Vetch Field, Swansea
Attendance: 2,078

23 December 1995

Burnley	0–0	Bristol City
	(Report)

Turf Moor, Burnley
Attendance: 9,327

13 January 1996

Burnley	4–3	Stockport County
Vinnicombe 6'; Cooke 17'; Nogan 69'; Francis 79'	(Report)	Bound; Flynn; Helliwell (o.g.)

Turf Moor, Burnley
Attendance: 9,113

20 January 1996

Rotherham United	1–0	Burnley
Berry 85'	(Report)

Millmoor, Rotherham
Attendance: 4,018

30 January 1996

Burnley	0–2	Oxford United
	(Report)	Allen; Massey

Turf Moor, Burnley
Attendance: 6,815

3 February 1996

Brentford	1–0	Burnley
Forster 61'	(Report)

Griffin Park, London
Attendance: 5,195

10 February 1996

Burnley	0–1	Crewe Alexandra
	(Report)	Edwards 21'

Turf Moor, Burnley
Attendance: 9,153

17 February 1996

Burnley	3–3	York City
Winstanley 50'; Francis 60'; Nogan 67'	(Report)	Murty; Naylor; Pepper

Turf Moor, Burnley
Attendance: 8,731

24 February 1996

Hull City	3–0	Burnley
Davison; Peacock	(Report)

Boothferry Park, Kingston upon Hull
Attendance: 4,206

2 March 1996

Burnley	0–1	Blackpool
	(Report)	Preece 62'

Turf Moor, Burnley
Attendance: 10,082

9 March 1996

Bristol City	0–1	Burnley
	(Report)	Nogan 84'

Ashton Gate, Bristol
Attendance: 6,612

12 March 1996

Blackpool	3–1	Burnley
Bonner; Ellis; Mellon	(Report)	Nogan 28'

Bloomfield Road, Blackpool
Attendance: 8,941

16 March 1996

Burnley	0–0	Swindon Town
	(Report)

Turf Moor, Burnley
Attendance: 9,360

19 March 1996

Crewe Alexandra	3–1	Burnley
Adebola; Garvey; Rivers	(Report)	Winstanley 65'

Gresty Road, Crewe
Attendance: 3,393

23 March 1996

Oxford United	5–0	Burnley
Aldridge; Beauchamp; Moody	(Report)

Manor Ground, Oxford
Attendance: 6,629

30 March 1996

Wycombe Wanderers	4–1	Burnley
de Souza; Farrell; Ryan	(Report)	Mahorn 54'

Adams Park, High Wycombe
Attendance: 4,921

2 April 1996

Burnley	0–0	Bournemouth
	(Report)

Turf Moor, Burnley
Attendance: 7,941

6 April 1996

Burnley	2–3	Bradford City
Robinson 54'; Eyres 69' (pen.)	(Report)	Kiwomya; Tolson; Winstanley (o.g.)

Turf Moor, Burnley
Attendance: 10,613

9 April 1996

Brighton & Hove Albion	1–0	Burnley
Rowe 19'	(Report)

Goldstone Ground, Brighton
Attendance: 5,954

13 April 1996

Burnley	2–1	Peterborough United
Joyce 52'; Swan 66'	(Report)	Heald 68'

Turf Moor, Burnley
Attendance: 8,393

17 April 1996

Swindon Town	0–0	Burnley
	(Report)

County Ground, Swindon
Attendance: 10,480

20 April 1996

Notts County	1–1	Burnley
Battersby 65'	(Report)	Swan 31'

Meadow Lane, Nottingham
Attendance: 5,697

23 April 1996

Burnley	0–1	Bristol Rovers
	(Report)	Stewart 64'

Turf Moor, Burnley
Attendance: 9,368

27 April 1996

Wrexham	0-2	Burnley
		Robinson; Nogan

Racecourse Ground, Wrexham
Attendance: 6,664

30 April 1996

Walsall	3–1	Burnley
Lightbourne; Platt; Wilson	(Report)	Nogan 51'

Bescot Stadium, Walsall
Attendance: 3,411

4 May 1996

Burnley	2–1	Shrewsbury Town
Weller 14'; Winstanley 73'	(Report)	Stevens 42'

Turf Moor, Burnley
Attendance: 9,729

=== Final league position ===
Pos	Team	Pld	W	D	L	GF	GA	GD	Pts
15	Brentford	46	15	13	18	43	49	−6	58
16	Rotherham United	46	14	14	18	54	62	−8	56
17	Burnley	46	14	13	19	56	68	−12	55
18	Shrewsbury Town	46	13	14	19	58	70	−12	53
19	Peterborough United	46	13	13	20	59	66	−7	52

=== League Cup ===
==== 1st round first leg ====
15 August 1995

Mansfield Town	0–1	Burnley
	(Report)	Nogan 28'

Field Mill, Mansfield
Attendance: 2,544

==== 1st round second leg ====
22 August 1995

Burnley	3–1	Mansfield Town
Randall 8'; Nogan 59' 68'	(Report)	Peters 61'

Turf Moor, Burnley
Attendance: 4,673

==== 2nd round first leg ====
2 September 1995

Leicester City	2–0	Burnley
Joachim; Robins	(Report)

Filbert Street, Leicester
Attendance: 11,142

==== 2nd round second leg ====
20 September 1995

Burnley	0–2	Leicester City
	(Report)	Robins 79' 87'

Turf Moor, Burnley
Attendance: 4,553

=== FA Cup ===
==== 1st round ====
10 November 1995

Burnley	1–3	Walsall
Eyres 25'	(Report)	Bradley; Houghton; Wilson

Turf Moor, Burnley
Attendance: 6,525

=== Football League Trophy ===
==== Northern Section 1st round group stage ====
17 October 1995

Rotherham United	1–1	Burnley
Hayward 67'		Nogan 44'

Millmoor, Rotherham
Attendance: 1,539

==== Northern Section 1st round group stage ====
7 November 1995

Burnley	1–1	Chester City
Nogan 43'		Richardson 54'

Turf Moor, Burnley
Attendance: 3,225

==== Northern Section 1st round group stage ====
29 November 1995

Crewe Alexandra	0–1	Burnley
		Nogan 105'

Gresty Road, Crewe
Attendance: 2,596

==== Northern Section quarter-final ====
6 January 1996

Carlisle United	5–0	Burnley
Edmondson 12', 14'; Reeves 30', 49', 89'

Brunton Park, Carlisle
Attendance: 5,169
