= 1994–95 Burnley F.C. season =

English football club season

Burnley
1994–95 season
- Chairman: Frank Teasdale
- Manager: Jimmy Mullen
- First Division: 22nd (relegated)
- FA Cup: Fourth round
- League Cup: Second round
- Top goalscorer: League: David Eyres (8 goals); All: David Eyres; Liam Robinson (10 each)
- Highest home attendance: 20,551 v Liverpool (28 January 1995)
- Lowest home attendance: 6,390 v York City (16 August 1994)
- Average home league attendance: 12,063

The 1994–95 season was Burnley's 1st season back in the second tier of English football. They were managed by Jimmy Mullen in his third full season since he replaced Frank Casper during the 1991–1992 campaign.

== Appearances and goals ==
No.	Pos	Nat	Player	Total		First Division		League Cup		FA Cup	
No.	Pos	Nat	Player	Apps	Goals	Apps	Goals	Apps	Goals	Apps	Goals
	MF	(Scotland) SCO	Derek Adams	0	0	0+0	0	0+0	0	0+0	0
	DF	(England) ENG	Craig Armstrong (on loan)	4	0	4+0	0	0+0	0	0+0	0
	GK	(England) ENG	Marlon Beresford	48	0	40+0	0	4+0	0	4+0	0
	DF	(England) ENG	Chris Brass	5	0	2+3	0	0+0	0	0+0	0
	DF	(England) ENG	Steve Davis	51	7	43+0	7	4+0	0	4+0	0
	MF	(England) ENG	John Deary	21	2	12+4	1	1+2	0	1+1	1
	DF	(England) ENG	Wayne Dowell	8	0	5+0	0	1+0	0	2+0	0
	MF	(England) ENG	David Eyres	46	10	38+1	8	2+0	0	5+0	2
	MF	(England) ENG	Andy Farrell	0	0	0+0	0	0+0	0	0+0	0
	FW	(England) ENG	John Francis	3	0	0+2	0	0+0	0	0+1	0
	FW	(England) ENG	John Gayle	18	5	7+7	3	1+1	1	1+1	1
	DF	(England) ENG	Alan Harper	36	0	27+0	0	4+0	0	5+0	0
	DF	(England) ENG	Gerry Harrison	22	2	16+3	2	1+1	0	1+0	0
	MF	(England) ENG	Adrian Heath	34	2	21+6	0	4+0	0	3+0	2
	MF	(England) ENG	Jamie Hoyland	34	2	30+0	2	0+0	0	4+0	0
	MF	(England) ENG	Warren Joyce	7	1	4+1	0	2+0	1	0+0	0
	FW	(England) ENG	Graham Lancashire	3	0	0+1	0	1+1	0	0+0	0
	MF	(Scotland) SCO	Ted McMinn	28	0	17+5	0	3+0	0	1+2	0
	DF	(England) ENG	Mark Monington	0	0	0+0	0	0+0	0	0+0	0
	MF	(England) ENG	John Mullin	14	1	6+6	1	0+0	0	2+0	0
	FW	(Wales) WAL	Kurt Nogan	15	3	11+4	3	0+0	0	0+0	0
	DF	(England) ENG	Gary Parkinson	52	2	42+1	2	4+0	0	5+0	0
	FW	(England) ENG	Nathan Peel	4	0	0+3	0	0+0	0	0+1	0
	DF	(Republic of Ireland) IRL	John Pender	5	0	5+0	0	0+0	0	0+0	0
	FW	(England) ENG	Tony Philliskirk	15	1	7+6	1	1+1	0	0+0	0
	MF	(England) ENG	Adrian Randall	37	2	32+0	1	0+0	0	5+0	1
	FW	(England) ENG	Liam Robinson	48	10	29+10	7	4+0	2	5+0	1
	GK	(Wales) WAL	Wayne Russell	9	0	6+2	0	0+0	0	1+0	0
	FW	(England) ENG	Andy Saville (on loan)	5	1	3+1	1	0+0	0	1+0	0
	MF	(England) ENG	Paul Shaw (on loan)	9	4	8+1	4	0+0	0	0+0	0
	MF	(England) ENG	Paul Smith	0	0	0+0	0	0+0	0	0+0	0
	FW	(England) ENG	Paul Stewart (on loan)	4	0	0+3	0	0+0	0	0+1	0
	MF	(England) ENG	Steve Thompson	12	0	12+0	0	0+0	0	0+0	0
	DF	(England) ENG	Chris Vinnicombe	32	1	29+0	1	3+0	0	0+0	0
	DF	(England) ENG	Paul Wilson	0	0	0+0	0	0+0	0	0+0	0
	DF	(England) ENG	Mark Winstanley	53	2	44+0	2	4+0	0	5+0	0

== Transfers ==
=== In ===
Pos	Player	From	Fee	Date
DF	(England) Chris Vinnicombe	Rangers	£200k	30 June 1994
FW	(England) Liam Robinson	Bristol City	£250k	26 July 1994
DF	(England) Gerry Harrison	Huddersfield Town	Free	5 August 1994
DF	(England) Mark Winstanley	Bolton Wanderers	Undisclosed	5 August 1994
DF	(England) Alan Harper	Luton Town	Free	11 August 1994
FW	(England) John Gayle	Coventry City	£70k	17 August 1994
MF	(England) Jamie Hoyland	Sheffield United	£130k	14 October 1994
DF	(England) Craig Armstrong	Nottingham Forest	Loan	29 December 1994
FW	(England) Andy Saville	Birmingham City	Loan	30 December 1994
MF	(Scotland) Derek Adams	Aberdeen	Undisclosed	24 January 1995
FW	(England) Paul Stewart	Liverpool	Loan	8 February 1995
MF	(England) Steve Thompson	Leicester City	£200k	24 February 1995
MF	(England) Paul Shaw	Arsenal	Loan	23 March 1995
FW	(Wales) Kurt Nogan	Brighton & Hove Albion	£250k	24 April 1995

=== Out ===
Pos	Player	To	Fee	Date
MF	(Northern Ireland) David Campbell	Wigan Athletic	Free	31 May 1994
MF	(Scotland) Paul McKenzie	Inverness Caledonian Thistle	Free	May 1994
DF	(England) Neil Howarth	Macclesfield Town	Free	May 1994
MF	(England) Roger Eli		Released	June 1994
FW	(Scotland) John Clayton		Retired	June 1994
MF	(England) Nick Pickering		Retired	June 1994
GK	(England) David Williams	Cardiff City	Free	12 August 1994
DF	(England) Les Thompson	Accrington Stanley	Free	August 1994
MF	(England) Andy Farrell	Wigan Athletic	£20k	22 September 1994
DF	(England) Paul Wilson	York City	£15k	6 October 1994
DF	(England) Chris Brass	Torquay United	Loan	14 October 1994
DF	(England) Mark Monington	Rotherham United	Undisclosed	28 November 1994
FW	(England) Graham Lancashire	Preston North End	£55k	23 December 1994
MF	(England) Warren Joyce	Hull City	Loan	20 January 1995
FW	(England) John Gayle	Stoke City	£70k	23 January 1995
MF	(England) John Deary	Rochdale	£25k	30 January 1995
FW	(England) Nathan Peel	Rotherham United	Loan	23 March 1995

== Matches ==
=== First Division ===
13 August 1994

Middlesbrough	2 – 0	Burnley
Hendrie 28' 35'	(Report)

Ayresome Park, Middlesbrough
Attendance: 23,343

20 August 1994

Burnley	1 – 1	Stoke City
Davis 43'	(Report)	Dreyer 90'

Turf Moor, Burnley
Attendance: 15,331

27 August 1994

Oldham Athletic	3 – 0	Burnley
McCarthy; Ritchie	(Report)

Boundary Park, Oldham
Attendance: 11,310

30 August 1994

Burnley	1 – 1	Bristol City
Robinson 40'	(Report)	Allison 90'

Turf Moor, Burnley
Attendance: 11,067

3 September 1994

Burnley	0 – 1	Barnsley
	(Report)	Payton 53'

Turf Moor, Burnley
Attendance: 11,968

10 September 1994

Luton Town	0 – 1	Burnley
	(Report)	Robinson 44'

Kenilworth Road, Luton
Attendance: 6,911

14 September 1994

Millwall	2 – 3	Burnley
Rae; Savage	(Report)	Winstanley 53' 69'; Robinson 79'

The New Den, London
Attendance: 7,375

17 September 1994

Burnley	0 – 1	Wolverhampton Wanderers
	(Report)	Bull 59'

Turf Moor, Burnley
Attendance: 17,776

24 September 1994

West Bromwich Albion	1 – 0	Burnley
Taylor 71'	(Report)

The Hawthorns, West Bromwich
Attendance: 13,539

1 October 1994

Burnley	1 – 1	Tranmere Rovers
Eyres 70' (pen.)	(Report)	Aldridge 26'

Turf Moor, Burnley
Attendance: 12,427

8 October 1994

Burnley	2 – 2	Bolton Wanderers
Davis 68'; Deary 72'	(Report)	Coleman; McGinlay

Turf Moor, Burnley
Attendance: 16,687

15 October 1994

Sunderland	0 – 0	Burnley
	(Report)

Roker Park, Sunderland
Attendance: 17,700

22 October 1994

Charlton Athletic	1 – 2	Burnley
Whyte 80'	(Report)	Davis 51'; Robinson 62'

The Valley, London
Attendance: 9,436

29 October 1994

Burnley	2 – 1	Notts County
Eyres 7' (pen.); Hoyland 52'	(Report)	Davis 51' (o.g.)

Turf Moor, Burnley
Attendance: 12,876

1 November 1994

Burnley	1 – 1	Watford
Eyres 72'	(Report)	Nogan 39'

Turf Moor, Burnley
Attendance: 11,739

5 November 1994

Reading	0 – 0	Burnley
	(Report)

Elm Park, Reading
Attendance: 8,150

20 November 1994

Burnley	4 – 2	Sheffield United
Robinson 24'; Hoyland 54'; Gayle 71'; Davis 78'	(Report)	Scott; Winstanley (o.g.)

Turf Moor, Burnley
Attendance: 11,475

23 November 1994

Swindon Town	1 – 1	Burnley
Scott 17'	(Report)	Gayle 68'

County Ground, Swindon
Attendance: 7,654

26 November 1994

Grimsby Town	2 – 2	Burnley
Gilbert; Woods	(Report)	Davis 57'; Parkinson 90'

Blundell Park, Cleethorpes
Attendance: 7,084

10 December 1994

Stoke City	2 – 0	Burnley
Örlygsson 69' 84'	(Report)

Victoria Ground, Stoke-on-Trent
Attendance: 13,040

18 December 1994

Burnley	0 – 3	Middlesbrough
	(Report)	Hendrie 14' 64' 90'

Turf Moor, Burnley
Attendance: 12,049

31 December 1994

Burnley	5 – 1	Southend United
Saville 27'; Gayle 34'; Bressington 51' (o.g.); Davis 86'; Robinson 90'	(Report)	Willis 69'

Turf Moor, Burnley
Attendance: 10,561

2 January 1995

Portsmouth	2 – 0	Burnley
Creaney; Preki	(Report)

Fratton Park, Portsmouth
Attendance: 9,097

14 January 1995

Notts County	3 – 0	Burnley
Devlin; McSwegan; White	(Report)

Meadow Lane, Nottingham
Attendance: 8,702

21 January 1995

Burnley	1 – 2	Reading
Parkinson 56'	(Report)	Nogan; Taylor

Turf Moor, Burnley
Attendance: 9,841

4 February 1995

Burnley	1 – 2	Swindon Town
Harrison 85'	(Report)	Thorne 43' 73'

Turf Moor, Burnley
Attendance: 10,960

11 February 1995

Watford	2 – 0	Burnley
Bazeley; Ramage	(Report)

Vicarage Road, Watford
Attendance: 9,297

18 February 1995

Burnley	0 – 2	Grimsby Town
	(Report)	Mendonca 25' 81'

Turf Moor, Burnley
Attendance: 10,511

21 February 1995

Sheffield United	2 – 0	Burnley
Blake 44' 90'	(Report)

Bramall Lane, Sheffield
Attendance: 13,349

25 February 1995

Tranmere Rovers	4 – 1	Burnley
Aldridge; Muir; Nevin	(Report)	Garnett 89' (o.g.)

Prenton Park, Birkenhead
Attendance: 9,909

4 March 1995

Burnley	1 – 1	West Bromwich Albion
Robinson 89'	(Report)	Hunt 63'

Turf Moor, Burnley
Attendance: 11,885

7 March 1995

Barnsley	2 – 0	Burnley
Payton; Taggart	(Report)

Oakwell, Barnsley
Attendance: 5,537

11 March 1995

Burnley	2 – 1	Oldham Athletic
Nogan 7'; Vinnicombe 76'	(Report)	McCarthy 47'

Turf Moor, Burnley
Attendance: 11,620

15 March 1995

Derby County	4 – 0	Burnley
Gabbiadini; Mills; Simpson; Trollope	(Report)

Baseball Ground, Derby
Attendance: 13,922

18 March 1995

Bristol City	1 – 1	Burnley
Partridge 13'	(Report)	Eyres 66'

Ashton Gate, Bristol
Attendance: 6,717

21 March 1995

Burnley	2 – 1	Luton Town
Mullin 73'; Harrison 83'	(Report)	Marshall 61'

Turf Moor, Burnley
Attendance: 9,551

24 March 1995

Wolverhampton Wanderers	2 – 0	Burnley
Bull; Emblen	(Report)

Molineux Stadium, Wolverhampton
Attendance: 25,703

28 March 1995

Burnley	4 – 3	Port Vale
Nogan 45'; Randall 60'; Shaw 64'; Sandeman 64' (o.g.)	(Report)	Allon; Foyle

Turf Moor, Burnley
Attendance: 10,058

1 April 1995

Burnley	1 – 2	Millwall
Shaw 75'	(Report)	Oldfield 38' 57'

Turf Moor, Burnley
Attendance: 10,454

4 April 1995

Burnley	2 – 0	Charlton Athletic
Eyres 24'; Shaw 81'	(Report)

Turf Moor, Burnley
Attendance: 10,045

8 April 1995

Southend United	3 – 1	Burnley
Battersby; Hails; Jones	(Report)	Nogan 82'

Roots Hall, Southend-on-Sea
Attendance: 5,027

15 April 1995

Burnley	3 – 1	Derby County
Eyres 12'; Shaw 19'; Davis 70'	(Report)	Trollope 68'

Turf Moor, Burnley
Attendance: 11,534

17 April 1995

Port Vale	1 – 0	Burnley
van der Laan 40'	(Report)

Vale Park, Stoke-on-Trent
Attendance: 9,663

22 April 1995

Burnley	1 – 2	Portsmouth
Eyres 81'	(Report)	Durnin; Symons

Turf Moor, Burnley
Attendance: 10,666

29 April 1995

Burnley	1 – 1	Sunderland
Eyres 36' (pen.)	(Report)	Smith 16'

Turf Moor, Burnley
Attendance: 15,121

7 May 1995

Bolton Wanderers	1 – 1	Burnley
Paatelainen 90'	(Report)	Philliskirk 61'

Burnden Park, Bolton
Attendance: 16,853

=== Final league position ===
Pos	Team	Pld	W	D	L	GF	GA	GD	Pts	Qualification or relegation
20	Sunderland	46	12	18	16	41	45	−4	54	
21	Swindon Town (R)	46	12	12	22	54	73	−19	48	Relegation to the Second Division
22	Burnley (R)	46	11	13	22	49	74	−25	46	Relegation to the Second Division
23	Bristol City (R)	46	11	12	23	42	63	−21	45	Relegation to the Second Division
24	Notts County (R)	46	9	13	24	45	66	−21	40	Relegation to the Second Division

Rules for classification: 1) Points; 2) Goals scored; 3) Goal difference
(R) Relegated

=== League Cup ===
==== 1st round first leg ====
16 August 1994

Burnley	1 – 0	York City
Joyce 73'	(Report)

Turf Moor, Burnley
Attendance: 6,390

==== 1st round second leg ====
23 August 1994

York City	2 – 2	Burnley
Cooper; Pepper	(Report)	Robinson 64'; Gayle 67'

Bootham Crescent, York
Attendance: 3,089

==== 2nd round first leg ====
21 September 1994

Liverpool	2 – 0	Burnley
Scales 42'; Fowler 84'	(Report)

Anfield, Liverpool
Attendance: 23,359

==== 2nd round second leg ====
5 October 1994

Burnley	1 – 4	Liverpool
Robinson 84'	(Report)	Redknapp 15' 68'; Fowler 51'; Clough 75'

Turf Moor, Burnley
Attendance: 19,032

=== FA Cup ===
==== 1st round ====
12 November 1994

Burnley	2 – 1	Shrewsbury Town
Heath 28'; Deary 46'	(Report)	Spink 36'

Turf Moor, Burnley
Attendance: 9,269

==== 2nd round ====
4 December 1994

Chester City	1 – 2	Burnley
Milner 76'	(Report)	Eyres 49' (pen.); Heath 85'

Deva Stadium, Chester
Attendance: 4,231

==== 3rd round ====
7 January 1995

Cambridge United	2 – 4	Burnley
Butler 18' 86'	(Report)	Eyres 25' (pen.); Robinson 45'; Randall 73'; Gayle 77'

Abbey Stadium, Cambridge
Attendance: 6,275

==== 4th round ====
28 January 1995

Burnley	0 – 0	Liverpool
	(Report)

Turf Moor, Burnley
Attendance: 20,551

==== 4th round replay ====
7 February 1995

Liverpool	1 – 0	Burnley
Barnes 44'	(Report)

Anfield, Liverpool
Attendance: 32,109
