= 1996–97 Burnley F.C. season =

English football club season

Burnley
1996–97 season
- Chairman: Frank Teasdale
- Manager: Adrian Heath
- Second Division: 9th
- FA Cup: Third round
- League Cup: Second round
- Football League Trophy: Second round
- Top goalscorer: League: Paul Barnes (24); All: Paul Barnes (25)
- Highest home attendance: 16,186 v Preston North End (25 December 1996)
- Lowest home attendance: 2,281 v Charlton Athletic (24 September 1996)
- Average home league attendance: 10,053
Home colours

The 1996–97 season was Burnley's 2nd successive season in the third tier of English football. They were managed by Adrian Heath in his only full season since he replaced Jimmy Mullen in March 1996.

== Appearances and goals ==
No.	Pos	Nat	Player	Total		Second Division		League Cup		FA Cup		FL Trophy	
No.	Pos	Nat	Player	Apps	Goals	Apps	Goals	Apps	Goals	Apps	Goals	Apps	Goals
	FW	(England) ENG	Paul Barnes	45	25	39+1	24	2+0	0	3+0	1	0+0	0
	GK	(England) ENG	Marlon Beresford	48	0	40+0	0	2+0	0	4+0	0	2+0	0
	DF	(England) ENG	Chris Brass	48	0	37+2	0	2+1	0	3+1	0	2+0	0
	FW	(England) ENG	Colin Carr-Lawton	1	0	0+0	0	0+0	0	0+0	0	0+1	0
	FW	(England) ENG	Andy Cooke	38	14	19+12	13	1+2	1	1+2	0	1+0	0
	MF	(England) ENG	David Eyres	46	8	36+0	3	4+0	3	4+0	1	2+0	1
	FW	(England) ENG	Nigel Gleghorn	43	5	32+1	4	4+0	0	4+0	1	2+0	0
	FW	(England) ENG	Steve Guinan (on loan)	6	0	0+6	0	0+0	0	0+0	0	0+0	0
	MF	(England) ENG	Gerry Harrison	42	0	32+3	0	2+0	0	4+0	0	0+1	0
	MF	(England) ENG	Adrian Heath	2	0	0+2	0	0+0	0	0+0	0	0+0	0
	DF	(Australia) AUS	Doug Hodgson (on loan)	1	0	1+0	0	0+0	0	0+0	0	0+0	0
	MF	(England) ENG	Jamie Hoyland	31	1	24+1	1	4+0	0	2+0	0	0+0	0
	DF	(England) ENG	Richard Huxford	10	0	2+7	0	0+0	0	0+0	0	1+0	0
	MF	(England) ENG	Glen Little	12	0	5+4	0	0+0	0	1+1	0	0+1	0
	MF	(England) ENG	Damian Matthew	38	8	29+3	6	3+0	1	2+0	1	1+0	0
	FW	(Wales) WAL	Kurt Nogan	38	13	30+1	10	4+0	2	2+0	0	1+0	1
	DF	(England) ENG	Vince Overson	10	0	6+2	0	1+0	0	0+0	0	1+0	0
	DF	(England) ENG	Gary Parkinson	52	1	43+0	1	4+0	0	4+0	0	1+0	0
	FW	(England) ENG	Liam Robinson	11	0	3+5	0	1+1	0	0+0	0	1+0	0
	GK	(Wales) WAL	Wayne Russell	8	0	6+0	0	2+0	0	0+0	0	0+0	0
	MF	(England) ENG	Paul Smith	45	4	30+7	4	1+1	0	4+0	0	2+0	0
	DF	(England) ENG	Peter Swan	21	2	16+1	2	0+0	0	2+0	0	2+0	0
	MF	(England) ENG	Steve Thompson	23	1	14+5	1	2+0	0	0+0	0	1+1	0
	DF	(England) ENG	Chris Vinnicombe	8	0	6+2	0	0+0	0	0+0	0	0+0	0
	MF	(England) ENG	Paul Weller	39	2	22+9	2	1+1	0	2+2	0	2+0	0
	FW	(England) ENG	Mark Winstanley	42	0	34+1	0	4+0	0	2+0	0	0+1	0

== Transfers ==
=== In ===
Pos	Player	From	Fee	Date
MF	(England) Damian Matthew	Crystal Palace	£65k	23 July 1996
DF	(England) Vince Overson	Stoke City	Free	1 August 1996
MF	(England) Nigel Gleghorn	Stoke City	Free	15 August 1996
FW	(England) Paul Barnes	Birmingham City	£400k	6 September 1996
DF	(Australia) Doug Hodgson	Sheffield United	Loan	16 October 1996
MF	(England) Glen Little	Glentoran	£100k	29 November 1996
DF	(England) Richard Huxford	Bradford City	Free	21 January 1997
FW	(England) Steve Guinan	Nottingham Forest	Loan	27 March 1997

=== Out ===
Pos	Player	To	Fee	Date
DF	(England) Glen Davies	Hartlepool United	Free	31 May 1996
MF	(Scotland) Ted McMinn	Slough Town	Free	31 May 1996
DF	(England) Alan Harper	Rotherham United	Free	31 May 1996
FW	(England) Nathan Peel	Rotherham United	Released	31 May 1996
	(England) Matthew Taylor		Released	31 May 1996
FW	(England) John Francis	Scunthorpe United	Free	31 May 1996
MF	(England) Warren Joyce	Hull City	£30k	10 July 1996
DF	(England) Wayne Dowell	Rochdale	Free	25 July 1996
MF	(Scotland) Derek Adams	Ross County	Free	30 July 1996
MF	(England) John Borland	Scunthorpe United	Free	16 August 1996
FW	(England) Ian Helliwell	Mansfield Town	Loan	6 September 1996
FW	(England) Ian Helliwell	Chester City	Loan	11 October 1996
FW	(England) Phil Eastwood	Leek Town	Loan	1 November 1996
FW	(Wales) Kurt Nogan	Preston North End	£150k	12 March 1997
FW	(England) Ian Duerden	Southport	Loan	27 March 1997

== Matches ==
=== Second Division ===
17 August 1996

Luton Town	1 – 2	Burnley
Thorpe 36'	(Report)	Thompson 24'; Nogan 32'

Kenilworth Road, Luton
Attendance: 6,484 (1,886 away)
Referee: P Rejer

24 August 1996

Burnley	2 – 1	Walsall
Eyres 21'; Nogan 48'	(Report)	Wilson 43'

Turf Moor, Burnley
Attendance: 10,322

27 August 1996

Burnley	1 – 3	Shrewsbury Town
Cooke 49'	(Report)	M. Taylor 20'; Scott 48'; Stevens 84'

Turf Moor, Burnley
Attendance: 9,072

31 August 1996

Millwall	2 – 1	Burnley
Newman 70'; Neill 79'	(Report)	Nogan 75'

The New Den, London
Attendance: 9,281
Referee: S Baines

7 September 1996

Gillingham	1 – 0	Burnley
Fortune-West 80'	(Report)

Priestfield, Gillingham
Attendance: 6,116

10 September 1996

Burnley	2 – 0	Blackpool
Gleghorn 60'; Nogan 76'	(Report)

Turf Moor, Burnley
Attendance: 13,599
Referee: D Laws

14 September 1996

Burnley	2 – 1	Wycombe Wanderers
Nogan 23' 35'	(Report)	de Souza 1'

Turf Moor, Burnley
Attendance: 9,379

21 September 1996

Chesterfield	0 – 0	Burnley
	(Report)

Saltergate, Chesterfield
Attendance: 5,529
Referee: R Pearson

28 September 1996

Burnley	2 – 3	Bristol City
Gleghorn 45'; Weller 55'	(Report)	Goater 12' 62'; Taylor 79'

Turf Moor, Burnley
Attendance: 9,538

1 October 1996

Bury	1 – 0	Burnley
Jepson 14'	(Report)

Gigg Lane, Bury
Attendance: 7,557

5 October 1996

Burnley	5 – 2	Stockport County
Barnes 32' 45' 61' 71' 78'	(Report)	Angell 56'; Mutch 75'

Turf Moor, Burnley
Attendance: 10,687

12 October 1996

Rotherham United	1 – 0	Burnley
Druce 42'	(Report)

Millmoor, Rotherham
Attendance: 4,562

15 October 1996

Watford	2 – 2	Burnley
Andrews 39'; Johnson 78'	(Report)	Gleghorn 28'; Smith 76'

Vicarage Road, Watford
Attendance: 6,450

19 October 1996

Burnley	1 – 0	Notts County
Barnes 60'	(Report)

Turf Moor, Burnley
Attendance: 9,372

26 October 1996

Burnley	2 – 1	Plymouth Argyle
Nogan 28'; Eyres 47' (pen.)	(Report)	Evans 73'

Turf Moor, Burnley
Attendance: 9,602

29 October 1996

Preston North End	1 – 1	Burnley
Reeves 26'	(Report)	Nogan 52'

Deepdale, Preston
Attendance: 12,652

2 November 1996

York City	1 – 0	Burnley
Murty 41'	(Report)

Bootham Crescent, York
Attendance: 5,958

9 November 1996

Burnley	2 – 0	Crewe Alexandra
Nogan 31'; Matthew 69'	(Report)

Turf Moor, Burnley
Attendance: 9,459

19 November 1996

Bristol Rovers	1 – 2	Burnley
Beadle 48'	(Report)	Barnes 33' 46'

Memorial Stadium, Bristol
Attendance: 4,123

23 November 1996

Burnley	1 – 0	Bournemouth
Barnes 6'	(Report)

Turf Moor, Burnley
Attendance: 8,564

30 November 1996

Plymouth Argyle	0 – 0	Burnley
	(Report)

Home Park, Plymouth
Attendance: 6,289

3 December 1996

Burnley	2 – 0	Wrexham
Cooke 32'; Nogan 40'	(Report)

Turf Moor, Burnley
Attendance: 8,587

14 December 1996

Burnley	1 – 2	Brentford
Swan 85'	(Report)	Asaba 15'; Forster 54'

Turf Moor, Burnley
Attendance: 10,575

20 December 1996

Peterborough United	3 – 2	Burnley
Carruthers 20' 27'; Morrison 60'	(Report)	Barnes 6'; Matthew 83'

London Road, Peterborough
Attendance: 5,283

28 December 1996

Burnley	5 – 1	Gillingham
Cooke 21' 86'; Smith 62'; Barnes 82' (pen.) 88'	(Report)	Bailey 14'

Turf Moor, Burnley
Attendance: 10,004

11 January 1997

Bristol City	2 – 1	Burnley
Bent 19'; Goater 68'	(Report)	Smith 36'

Ashton Gate, Bristol
Attendance: 10,013

17 January 1997

Burnley	3 – 1	Bury
Swan 19'; Smith 26'; Eyres 29'	(Report)	Matthews 32'

Turf Moor, Burnley
Attendance: 10,526

25 January 1997

Burnley	1 – 2	Preston North End
Barnes 10'	(Report)	Ashcroft 6' 69'

Turf Moor, Burnley
Attendance: 16,186

28 January 1997

Burnley	0 – 0	Chesterfield
	(Report)

Turf Moor, Burnley
Attendance: 7,903

1 February 1997

Crewe Alexandra	1 – 1	Burnley
Macauley 50'	(Report)	Barnes 88'

Gresty Road, Crewe
Attendance: 4,743

8 February 1997

Burnley	1 – 2	York City
Gleghorn 13'	(Report)	Tolson 6'; Jordan 90'

Turf Moor, Burnley
Attendance: 8,961

15 February 1997

Bournemouth	0 – 0	Burnley
	(Report)

Dean Court, Bournemouth
Attendance: 6,021

22 February 1997

Burnley	2 – 2	Bristol Rovers
Matthew 38'; Barnes 90'	(Report)	Cureton 13'; Alsop 80'

Turf Moor, Burnley
Attendance: 8,847

25 February 1997

Blackpool	1 – 3	Burnley
Quinn 15'	(Report)	Barnes 6' 42' 47'

Bloomfield Road, Blackpool
Attendance: 7,331

1 March 1997

Wrexham	0 – 0	Burnley
	(Report)

Racecourse Ground, Wrexham
Attendance: 6,947

8 March 1997

Burnley	5 – 0	Peterborough United
Barnes 8' 30' 33'; Cooke 56'; Matthew 85'	(Report)

Turf Moor, Burnley
Attendance: 8,646

15 March 1997

Brentford	0 – 3	Burnley
	(Report)	Hoyland 9'; Cooke 34'; Matthew 45'

Griffin Park, London
Attendance: 6,624

22 March 1997

Walsall	1 – 3	Burnley
Lightbourne 90'	(Report)	Cooke 26' 55'; Barnes 85'

Bescot Stadium, Walsall
Attendance: 6,306

29 March 1997

Burnley	0 – 2	Luton Town
	(Report)	Thorpe 14' 39'

Turf Moor, Burnley
Attendance: 15,490

1 April 1997

Shrewsbury Town	2 – 1	Burnley
Brass 80' (o.g.); Spink 86'	(Report)	Barnes 74'

Gay Meadow, Shrewsbury
Attendance: 4,462

5 April 1997

Burnley	1 – 0	Millwall
Weller 14'	(Report)

Turf Moor, Burnley
Attendance: 9,840

12 April 1997

Stockport County	1 – 0	Burnley
Mutch 86'	(Report)

Edgeley Park, Stockport
Attendance: 9,187

15 April 1997

Wycombe Wanderers	5 – 0	Burnley
Carroll 12' (pen.) 29' (pen.); McGavin 33'; Stallard 42'; Read 82'	(Report)

Adams Park, High Wycombe
Attendance: 5,786

19 April 1997

Burnley	3 – 3	Rotherham United
Cooke 13' 58'; Barnes 60'	(Report)	Jean 25' 55' 57'

Turf Moor, Burnley
Attendance: 7,875

26 April 1997

Notts County	1 – 1	Burnley
Dudley 27'	(Report)	Matthew 90'

Meadow Lane, Nottingham
Attendance: 4,591

3 May 1997

Burnley	4 – 1	Watford
Cooke 50' 51' 83' (pen.); Parkinson 66'	(Report)	Millen 88'

Turf Moor, Burnley
Attendance: 8,269

=== Final league position ===
Pos	Team	Pld	W	D	L	GF	GA	GD	Pts
7	Blackpool	46	18	15	13	60	47	+13	69
8	Wrexham	46	17	18	11	55	50	+5	69
9	Burnley	46	19	11	16	71	55	+16	68
10	Chesterfield	46	18	14	14	42	39	+3	68
11	Gillingham	46	19	10	17	60	59	+1	67

Rules for classification: In the Football League goals scored (GF) takes precedence over goal difference (GD).

=== League Cup ===
==== 1st round first leg ====
20 August 1996

Mansfield Town	0 – 3	Burnley
	(Report)	Cooke 31'; Nogan 50'; Eyres 74'

Field Mill, Mansfield
Attendance: 1,708

(384 away)

==== 1st round second leg ====
3 September 1996

Burnley	2 – 0	Mansfield Town
Matthew 2'; Eyres 45'	(Report)

Turf Moor, Burnley
Attendance: 2,884

==== 2nd round first leg ====
17 September 1996

Charlton Athletic	4 – 1	Burnley
Leaburn 5'; Robinson 41' 48'; Allen 48'	(Report)	Eyres 7'

The Valley, London
Attendance: 4,874

==== 2nd round second leg ====
24 September 1996

Burnley	1 – 2	Charlton Athletic
Nogan 45'	(Report)	Allen 15'; Whyte 90'

Turf Moor, Burnley
Attendance: 2,281

=== FA Cup ===
==== 1st round ====
16 November 1996

Burnley	2 – 1	Lincoln City
Gleghorn 30'; Matthew 73'	(Report)	Bos 46'

Turf Moor, Burnley
Attendance: 6,484

==== 2nd round ====
7 December 1996

Walsall	1 – 1	Burnley
Lightbourne 90'	(Report)	Eyres 66'

Bescot Stadium, Walsall
Attendance: 5,031

==== 2nd round replay ====
23 December 1996

Burnley	1 – 1 (a.e.t.)	Walsall
Barnes 43'	(Report)	Viveash 74'
Penalties
Barnes (penalty scored); Smith (penalty scored); Matthew (penalty scored); Parkinson (penalty missed); Eyres (penalty scored)	4 – 2	(penalty missed) Marsh; (penalty scored) Lightbourne; (penalty missed) Blake; (penalty scored) Watson

Turf Moor, Burnley
Attendance: 5,799

==== 3rd round ====
4 January 1997

Liverpool	1 – 0	Burnley
Collymore 12'	(Report)

Anfield, Liverpool
Attendance: 33,252

(7,000 away)

=== Football League Trophy ===
==== Northern Section 1st round ====
10 December 1996

Hartlepool United	0 – 2	Burnley
		Nogan 14'; Eyres 65'

Victoria Park, Hartlepool
Attendance: 921

==== Northern Section 2nd round ====
4 February 1997

Burnley	0 – 1	Stockport County
		Nash 18'

Turf Moor, Burnley
Attendance: 4,251
