= 1993–94 Burnley F.C. season =

English football club season

Burnley
1993–94 season
- Chairman: Frank Teasdale
- Manager: Jimmy Mullen
- Second Division: 6th (Promoted)
- League Cup: 2nd Round
- FA Cup: 3rd Round
- Football League Trophy: 1st Round
- Top goalscorer: League: David Eyres (19); All: David Eyres (28)
- Highest home attendance: 18,165 v Blackpool (1 January 1994)
- Lowest home attendance: 4,674 v Carlisle United (9 November 1993)
- Average home league attendance: 11,317

The 1993–94 season was Burnley's second season in the third tier of English football. They were managed by Jimmy Mullen in his second full season since he replaced Frank Casper during the 1991–1992 campaign.

== Appearances and goals ==
No.	Pos	Nat	Player	Total		Second Division		League Cup		FA Cup		Other^{[A]}	
No.	Pos	Nat	Player	Apps	Goals	Apps	Goals	Apps	Goals	Apps	Goals	Apps	Goals
	GK	(England) ENG	Marlon Beresford	59	0	46+0	0	4+0	0	4+0	0	5+0	0
	DF	(England) ENG	Steve Davis	55	8	42+0	7	4+0	1	4+0	0	5+0	0
	MF	(England) ENG	John Deary	56	5	43+0	4	4+0	1	4+0	0	5+0	0
	MF	(England) ENG	David Eyres	58	28	45+0	19	4+0	3	4+0	4	5+0	2
	MF	(England) ENG	Andy Farrell	28	2	13+9	2	2+1	0	1+0	0	0+2	0
	FW	(England) ENG	John Francis	56	10	31+12	7	3+1	1	4+0	0	4+1	2
	MF	(England) ENG	Adrian Heath	53	10	41+0	9	3+0	0	4+0	1	5+0	0
	MF	(England) ENG	Warren Joyce	33	6	19+3	4	2+0	0	4+0	1	5+0	1
	FW	(England) ENG	Graham Lancashire	2	0	0+1	0	0+0	0	0+0	0	0+1	0
	MF	(Scotland) SCO	Ted McMinn	17	3	14+0	3	0+0	0	0+0	0	3+0	0
	DF	(England) ENG	Ian Measham	8	0	6+0	0	2+0	0	0+0	0	0+0	0
	DF	(England) ENG	Mark Monington	26	1	16+4	1	1+0	0	3+0	0	2+0	0
	MF	(England) ENG	John Mullin	6	1	1+5	1	0+0	0	0+0	0	0+0	0
	DF	(England) ENG	Gary Parkinson	23	2	20+0	1	0+0	0	0+0	0	3+0	1
	DF	(England) ENG	Ian Patterson	3	0	0+1	0	2+0	0	0+0	0	0+0	0
	FW	(England) ENG	Nathan Peel	18	2	4+9	2	1+0	0	0+2	0	0+2	0
	DF	(Republic of Ireland) IRL	John Pender	56	1	42+1	1	4+0	0	4+0	0	5+0	0
	FW	(England) ENG	Tony Philliskirk	19	7	19+0	7	0+0	0	0+0	0	0+0	0
	MF	(England) ENG	Adrian Randall	41	4	31+6	4	2+0	0	0+1	0	1+0	0
	FW	(England) ENG	Kevin Russell	37	8	26+2	6	4+0	1	4+0	0	1+0	1
	MF	(England) ENG	Paul Smith	1	0	0+1	0	0+0	0	0+0	0	0+0	0
	DF	(England) ENG	Les Thompson	49	0	36+0	0	4+0	0	4+0	0	5+0	0
	DF	(England) ENG	Paul Wilson	12	0	11+0	0	0+0	0	0+1	0	0+0	0

A. The "Other" column constitutes appearances and goals (including those as a substitute) in the Football League Trophy and play-offs.

== Transfers ==
=== In ===
Pos	Player	From	Fee	Date
FW	(England) Kevin Russell	Stoke City	£150,000	28 June 1993
MF	(England) Warren Joyce	Plymouth Argyle	£140,000	7 July 1993
FW	(England) David Eyres	Blackpool	£90,000	29 July 1993
GK	(Wales) Wayne Russell	Ebbw Vale	Free	28 October 1993
FW	(England) Tony Philliskirk	Peterborough United	£80,000	21 January 1994
DF	(England) Gary Parkinson	Bolton Wanderers	Free	27 January 1994
MF	(Scotland) Ted McMinn	Birmingham City	Free	5 April 1994

=== Out ===
Pos	Player	To	Fee	Date
	(England) Jamie Webster		Released	31 May 1993
MF	(Northern Ireland) Danny Sonner	SC Preußen Münster	Free	1 June 1993
MF	(England) Mark Yates	Doncaster Rovers	Free	1 August 1993
MF	(England) Steve Harper	Doncaster Rovers	Free	7 August 1993
MF	(England) Joe Jakub	Chester City	Free	12 August 1993
FW	(Scotland) Mike Conroy	Preston North End	£85,000	20 August 1993
FW	(England) Robbie Painter	Darlington	Free	16 September 1993
DF	(England) Ian Measham	Doncaster Rovers	Free	16 September 1993
FW	(England) Kevin Russell	Bournemouth	£125,000	3 March 1994

== Matches ==
=== Football League Second Division ===
Key

- In Result column, Burnley's score shown first
- H = Home match
- A = Away match
- pen. = Penalty kick
- o.g. = Own goal

Results

Date	Opponents	Result	Goalscorers	Attendance
14 August 1993	Port Vale (H)	2–1	Joyce (2) 14', 53'	12,594
21 August 1993	Reading (A)	1–2	Eyres 85' (pen.)	5,855
28 August 1993	Leyton Orient (H)	4–1	Eyres 25', Deary 36', Farrell 55', Heath 90'	10,133
31 August 1993	Rotherham United (A)	2–3	Law 20' (o.g.), Francis 46'	5,533
4 September 1993	Bournemouth (A)	0–1		5,574
11 September 1993	Fulham (H)	3–1	Randall 8', Eyres 51', Deary 64'	9,021
14 September 1993	Brighton & Hove Albion (H)	3–0	Russell (2) 1', 47', Davis 31'	8,837
18 September 1993	Stockport County (A)	1–2	Francis 27'	5,122
25 September 1993	Bristol Rovers (A)	1–3	Russell 81'	5,732
2 October 1993	Hartlepool United (H)	2–0	Eyres 36', Heath 74'	9,532
9 October 1993	Plymouth Argyle (H)	4–2	Eyres 8', Monington 57', Peel (2) 65', 73'	10,488
16 October 1993	Bradford City (A)	1–0	Heath 10'	9,501
23 October 1993	Huddersfield Town (H)	1–1	Eyres 82' (pen.)	12,011
30 October 1993	Cambridge United (A)	1–0	Eyres 1'	4,826
2 November 1993	Swansea City (A)	1–3	Francis 22'	3,358
6 November 1993	York City (H)	2–1	Eyres (2) 22' (pen.), 79'	10,236
20 November 1993	Brentford (A)	0–0		6,085
27 November 1993	Exeter City (H)	3–2	Russell 37', Eyres 45' (pen.), Francis 46'	9,040
11 December 1993	Reading (H)	0–1		11,650
18 December 1993	Port Vale (A)	1–1	Mullin 85'	10,710
27 December 1993	Wrexham (H)	2–1	Russell 51', Davis 65'	15,357
29 December 1993	Barnet (A)	1–1	Heath 90'	2,360
1 January 1994	Blackpool (H)	3–1	Farrell 24', Russell 50', Francis 55'	18,165
3 January 1994	Hull City (A)	2–1	Davis 45', Deary 79'	11,232
15 January 1994	Bradford City (H)	0–1		13,517
22 January 1994	Plymouth Argyle (A)	2–3	Heath 66', Philliskirk 82'	10,595
29 January 1994	Cambridge United (H)	3–0	Randall 35', Eyres 87' (pen.), Heath 90'	10,659
5 February 1994	Huddersfield Town (A)	1–1	Deary 54'	10,634
12 February 1994	Cardiff City (H)	2–0	Philliskirk 54', Francis 69'	11,276
19 February 1994	Leyton Orient (A)	1–3	Parkinson 28'	5,201
26 February 1994	Bournemouth (H)	4–0	Eyres 2', Philliskirk 16', Joyce 52', Davis 58'	10,383
1 March 1994	Cardiff City (A)	1–2	Davis 18'	5,469
5 March 1994	Fulham (A)	2–3	Eyres 27', Randall 42'	4,493
12 March 1994	Stockport County (H)	1–1	McMinn 58'	13,130
16 March 1994	Brighton & Hove Albion (A)	1–1	Davis 1'	8,021
19 March 1994	Bristol Rovers (H)	3–1	Philliskirk 30', Heath 58', McMinn 90'	10,651
26 March 1994	Hartlepool United (A)	1–4	Eyres 43'	2,879
29 March 1994	Hull City (H)	3–1	Pender 44', Eyres (2) 67' (pen.), 80'	10,574
2 April 1994	Wrexham (A)	0–1		7,253
4 April 1994	Barnet (H)	5–0	Philliskirk (3) 47', 53', 69', Heath 80', Eyres 81'	10,412
9 April 1994	Blackpool (A)	2–1	Eyres 6', Francis 43'	7,956
16 April 1994	Swansea City (H)	1–1	Davis 64'	10,694
23 April 1994	York City (A)	0–0		8,642
26 April 1994	Rotherham United (H)	0–0		10,806
30 April 1994	Brentford (H)	4–1	Eyres 21', McMinn 32', Heath 47', Randall 81'	11,363
7 May 1994	Exeter City (A)	1–4	Joyce 46'	3,155

=== Final league position ===
Pos	Team	Pld	W	D	L	GF	GA	GD	Pts	Promotion or relegation
4	Stockport County	46	24	13	9	74	44	+30	85	Qualification for the Second Division play-offs
5	York City	46	21	12	13	64	40	+24	75	Qualification for the Second Division play-offs
6	Burnley (O, P)	46	21	10	15	79	58	+21	73	Qualification for the Second Division play-offs
7	Bradford City	46	19	13	14	61	53	+8	70	
8	Bristol Rovers	46	20	10	16	60	59	+1	70	

(O) Play-off winners; (P) Promoted

=== Play-Offs ===
Date	Round	Opponents	Result	Goalscorers	Attendance
15 May 1994	Semi final, first leg	Plymouth Argyle (H)	0–0		18,794
18 May 1994	Semi final, second leg	Plymouth Argyle (A)	3–1	Francis (2) 29' 31', Joyce 81'	17,515 (2,700 away)
29 May 1994	Final	Stockport County (N)	2–1	Eyres 29', Parkinson 66'	44,806

=== FA Cup ===
Date	Round	Opponents	Result	Goalscorers	Attendance
13 November 1993	Round 1	York City (H)	0–0		10,199
30 November 1993	Replay	York City (A)	3–2	Heath 5', Joyce 81', Eyres 89'	5,720
4 December 1993	Round 2	Rochdale (H)	4–1	Jones 25' (o.g.), Eyres (3) 43', 72', 88' (pen.)	11,388
8 January 1994	Round 3	Charlton Athletic (A)	0–3		8,336

=== League Cup ===
Date	Round	Opponents	Result	Goalscorers	Attendance
17 August 1993	Round 1 First leg	Preston North End (A)	2–1	Eyres 27' (pen.), Davis 77'	6,283
25 August 1993	Round 1 Second leg	Preston North End (H)	4–1	Russell 15', Eyres 46', Francis 56', Deary 65'	9,346
22 September 1993	Round 2 First leg	Tottenham Hotspur (H)	0–0		16,844
6 October 1993	Round 2 Second leg	Tottenham Hotspur (A)	1–3	Eyres 7'	20,614

=== Football League Trophy ===
Date	Round	Opponents	Result	Goalscorers	Attendance
19 October 1993	Round 1	Preston North End (A)	1–2	Eyres 87'	4,485
9 November 1993	Round 1	Carlisle United (H)	1–2	Russell 51'	4,674
