= 1991–92 Burnley F.C. season =

English football club season

Burnley
1991–92 season
- Chairman: Frank Teasdale
- Manager: Frank Casper (until October 1991); Jimmy Mullen (from October 1991)
- Division Four: 1st (champions)
- League Cup: First round
- FA Cup: Third round
- Football League Trophy: Northern Final
- Top goalscorer: League: Mike Conroy (24); All: Mike Conroy (29)
- Highest home attendance: 21,216 v Wrexham (2 MAY 1992)
- Lowest home attendance: 2,590 v Doncaster Rovers (19 November 1991)
- Average home league attendance: 10,519
Home colours

The 1991–92 season was Burnley's 104th season of League football and their seventh consecutive campaign in the fourth tier of English football. Frank Casper started the season as manager, having been appointed to the post two years previously, before he was replaced by Jimmy Mullen in October 1991.

== Background and pre-season ==
Frank Casper started the season as manager of Burnley, having originally held the post in a caretaker capacity during the 1982–83 campaign and then returning as the permanent appointment in January 1989. The chairman of the club was Frank Teasdale, who had taken control of Burnley in May 1985. The team had steadily improved since their narrow avoidance of relegation on the last day of the 1986–87 season, and having reached the play-offs at the end of the previous campaign, the Burnley side was confident of achieving promotion back to the Football League Third Division for the first time in seven years.

Burnley began their pre-season with a short tour of Russia in July 1991. A Mike Conroy goal helped the team to a 1–1 draw with FC Dynamo Stavropol in the first game of the tour, followed by a match at Asmaral which ended in the same scoreline four days later. Upon their return to England, Burnley competed in the Lancashire Manx Cup but were knocked out in the group stage following defeats to Bury and Preston North End and a draw with rivals Blackburn Rovers. On 8 August, Burnley played a testimonial match against Oldham Athletic at Turf Moor in honour of former physiotherapist Jimmy Holland, who had assisted the club between 1965 and 1991.

== Transfers ==
The majority of the team from the previous campaign remained at Burnley, with only three new players signing permanent contracts during the close season. Mark Yates was signed from Birmingham City on a free transfer, while fellow midfielder Steve Harper joined from Lancashire rivals Preston North End. Fees were paid for two players; striker Mike Conroy arrived from Reading for a transfer fee of £35,000, and central defender Steve Davis, who had spent a spell on loan at Burnley in the 1989–90 campaign, was bought for £60,000 from Southampton. Goalkeeper Andy Marriott also joined the club on loan from Nottingham Forest in August 1991. Several players also departed Burnley during the summer of 1991. Neil Grewcock and Ray Deakin, the last two to remain from the side that achieved a 2–1 win against Orient in May 1987 to avoid relegation to the Football Conference, both left the club; Deakin retired from football at the age of 32, while Grewcock moved into the amateur game with local club Burnley Bank Hall. The contract of Ron Futcher, Burnley's top scorer in the previous season with 19 goals, was terminated by mutual consent and he subsequently joined Crewe Alexandra.

Following the appointment of Jimmy Mullen as manager in October 1991, Burnley resumed their activity in the transfer market. Two more goalkeepers, Mark Kendall and Nicky Walker, were brought in on loan. Adrian Randall arrived from Aldershot in December 1991, while Paul McKenzie joined from Scottish side Peterhead a month later. Burnley's last signing of the season was midfielder Robbie Painter, who was bought for £25,000 from fellow Fourth Division club Maidstone United on transfer deadline day in March 1992. In April 1992, Ian Bray was forced to retire from professional football due to an injury, and Jason Hardy departed for Halifax Town the same month.

In
Player	From	Date
Mike Conroy	Reading	July 1991
Steve Harper	Preston North End	July 1991
Steve Davis	Southampton	August 1991
Andy Marriott	Nottingham Forest (on loan)	August 1991
Mark Yates	Birmingham City	August 1991
Mark Kendall	Swansea City (on loan)	December 1991
Adrian Randall	Aldershot	December 1991
Paul McKenzie	Peterhead	January 1992
Nicky Walker	Heart of Midlothian (on loan)	February 1992
Robbie Painter	Maidstone United	March 1992

Out
Player	To	Date
Ray Deakin	Retired	May 1991
Neil Grewcock	Burnley Bank Hall	May 1991
Steve Davis	Barnsley	July 1991
Ron Futcher	Crewe Alexandra	July 1991
Andy Marriott	Nottingham Forest (loan return)	November 1991
Mark Kendall	Swansea City (loan return)	January 1992
Nicky Walker	Heart of Midlothian (loan return)	March 1992
Ian Bray	Retired	April 1992
Jason Hardy	Halifax Town	April 1992

== Appearances and goals ==
No.	Pos	Nat	Player	Total		Division Four		League Cup		FA Cup		FL Trophy	
No.	Pos	Nat	Player	Apps	Goals	Apps	Goals	Apps	Goals	Apps	Goals	Apps	Goals
	DF	(Wales) WAL	Ian Bray	9	0	5+1	0	2+0	0	0+0	0	1+0	0
	FW	(Scotland) SCO	Mike Conroy	51	29	38+0	24	2+0	1	5+0	1	4+2	3
	DF	(England) ENG	Steve Davis	53	8	40+0	6	2+0	1	5+0	1	6+0	0
	MF	(England) ENG	John Deary	54	7	40+0	6	2+0	0	5+0	0	7+0	1
	FW	(England) ENG	Roger Eli	47	17	29+4	10	2+0	0	3+2	2	7+0	5
	MF	(England) ENG	Andy Farrell	53	3	38+1	3	0+2	0	5+0	0	7+0	0
	DF	(England) ENG	Paul France	8	0	6+0	0	1+0	0	1+0	0	0+0	0
	FW	(England) ENG	John Francis	50	11	36+1	8	2+0	0	5+0	0	6+0	3
	MF	(England) ENG	David Hamilton	5	0	3+1	0	1+0	0	0+0	0	0+0	0
	DF	(England) ENG	Jason Hardy	3	0	2+1	0	0+0	0	0+0	0	0+0	0
	MF	(England) ENG	Steve Harper	48	6	31+4	3	0+2	0	5+0	3	6+0	0
	DF	(Scotland) SCO	Joe Jakub	52	0	38+1	0	1+0	0	5+0	0	7+0	0
	GK	(Wales) WAL	Mark Kendall	3	0	2+0	0	0+0	0	1+0	0	0+0	0
	FW	(England) ENG	Graham Lancashire	35	9	9+16	8	0+0	0	2+2	1	3+3	0
	GK	(Wales) WAL	Andy Marriott	19	0	15+0	0	0+0	0	0+0	0	4+0	0
	MF	(Scotland) SCO	Paul McKenzie	6	0	1+3	0	0+0	0	0+0	0	0+2	0
	DF	(England) ENG	Ian Measham	37	1	27+0	1	1+0	0	4+0	0	5+0	0
	DF	(England) ENG	Mark Monington	17	1	8+4	1	2+0	0	0+0	0	2+1	0
	FW	(England) ENG	Peter Mumby	1	0	1+0	0	0+0	0	0+0	0	0+0	0
	FW	(England) ENG	Robbie Painter	9	2	9+0	2	0+0	0	0+0	0	0+0	0
	GK	(Wales) WAL	Chris Pearce	22	0	14+0	0	2+0	0	4+0	0	2+0	0
	DF	(Republic of Ireland) IRL	John Pender	53	4	39+0	3	2+0	0	5+0	0	7+0	1
	MF	(England) ENG	Adrian Randall	18	2	11+7	2	0+0	0	0+0	0	0+0	0
	MF	(Northern Ireland) NIR	Danny Sonner	3	0	0+3	0	0+0	0	0+0	0	0+0	0
	GK	(Scotland) SCO	Nicky Walker	7	0	6+0	0	0+0	0	0+0	0	1+0	0
	GK	(England) ENG	David Williams	5	0	5+0	0	0+0	0	0+0	0	0+0	0
	MF	(England) ENG	Mark Yates	22	1	9+8	1	0+0	0	0+2	0	2+1	0

== Matches ==
=== Football League Division Four ===
Key

- In Result column, Burnley's score shown first
- H = Home match
- A = Away match
- pen. = Penalty kick
- o.g. = Own goal

Results

Date	Opponents	Result	Goalscorers	Attendance
17 August 1991	Rotherham United (A)	1–2	Conroy 39'	6,042
31 August 1991	Doncaster Rovers (A)	4–1	Conroy (2) 1' (pen.), 85', Harper 73', Yates 77'	2,940
3 September 1991	Chesterfield (H)	3–0	Eli (3) 26', 54', 74'	6,647
7 September 1991	Crewe Alexandra (H)	1–1	Francis 52'	9,657
14 September 1991	Hereford United (A)	0–2		4,400
21 September 1991	Rochdale (H)	0–1		8,663
28 September 1991	Scarborough (A)	1–3	Lancashire 17'	2,596
5 October 1991	Carlisle United (H)	2–0	Pender 23', Lancashire 57'	6,157
12 October 1991	Wrexham (A)	6–2	Lancashire (3) 3', 27', 29', Harper 4', Davis 57', Eli 89'	3,181
19 October 1991	Walsall (H)	2–0	Davis 20' (pen.), Lancashire 23'	7,289
26 October 1991	Lincoln City (A)	3–0	Francis 39', Conroy 75' (pen.), Lancashire 83'	3,235
2 November 1991	Halifax Town (A)	2–0	Deary 55', Farrell 87'	4,491
5 November 1991	York City (H)	3–1	Conroy 10', Deary 16', Lancashire 82'	7,389
9 November 1991	Mansfield Town (H)	3–2	Conroy 7' (pen.), Davis 55', Pender 83'	11,848
23 November 1991	Maidstone United (A)	1–0	Conroy 28' (pen.)	2,375
30 November 1991	Northampton Town (A)	2–1	Conroy (2) 20', 86'	4,020
14 December 1991	Scunthorpe United (H)	1–1	Farrell 34'	8,419
26 December 1991	Rotherham United (H)	1–2	Francis 70'	13,812
28 December 1991	Doncaster Rovers (H)	2–1	Conroy 6', Eli 25'	9,605
1 January 1992	Chesterfield (A)	2–0	Deary 2', Francis 25'	7,789
11 January 1992	Blackpool (A)	2–5	Conroy 63', Francis 70'	8,007
18 January 1992	Gillingham (H)	4–1	Conroy (3) 8', 65', 83', Randall 66'	8,908
1 February 1992	Walsall (A)	2–2	Eli 69', Conroy 83'	5,287
8 February 1992	Lincoln City (H)	1–0	Conroy 45'	9,748
11 February 1992	Northampton Town (H)	5–0	Deary 35', Eli 50', Conroy 56', Harper 68', Francis 78'	8,825
15 February 1992	Scunthorpe United (A)	2–2	Conroy 46' (pen.), Davis 90'	5,303
22 February 1992	Blackpool (H)	1–1	Eli 30'	18,183
29 February 1992	Cardiff City (A)	2–0	Randall 85', Conroy 89'	16,030
3 March 1992	Gillingham (A)	0–3		3,729
7 March 1992	Barnet (H)	3–0	Davis 10', Barnett 52' (o.g.), Deary 61'	12,018
14 March 1992	Halifax Town (H)	1–0	Pender 70'	10,903
21 March 1992	Mansfield Town (A)	1–0	Conroy 41'	8,336
24 March 1992	Barnet (A)	0–0		4,881
28 March 1992	Maidstone United (H)	2–1	Davis 77', Eli 87'	10,986
31 March 1992	Hereford United (H)	2–0	Monington 25', Conroy 30'	10,578
4 April 1992	Crewe Alexandra (A)	0–1		5,530
20 April 1992	Scarborough (H)	1–1	Eli 9'	12,312
22 April 1992	Cardiff City (H)	3–1	Painter 1', Farrell 60', Conroy 63'	12,408
25 April 1992	Carlisle United (A)	1–1	Francis 43'	10,000 (7,500 away)
28 April 1992	York City (A)	2–1	Deary 60', Francis 90'	7,620 (5,000 away)
2 May 1992	Wrexham (H)	1–2	Conroy 33'	21,216
5 May 1992	Rochdale (A)	3–1	Measham 30', Conroy 41', Painter 67'	8,175 (5,100 away)

==== Expunged fixtures ====
Burnley played two matches against Aldershot during the 1991–92 campaign, winning both games. However, these results were expunged from official records after Aldershot resigned from the Football League mid-season.

Date	Opponents	Result	Goalscorers	Attendance
24 August 1991	Aldershot (H)	2–0	Conroy, Francis	5,877
21 December 1991	Aldershot (A)	2–1	Harper, Lancashire	2,574

==== Final league position ====
Pos	Team	Pld	W	D	L	GF	GA	GD	Pts	Promotion or relegation
1	Burnley (C, P)	42	25	8	9	79	43	+36	83	Promotion to the Second Division (Note: From the 1992–93 season, the third tier - then known as the Third Division - was renamed to the Second Division, and the fourth tier - then known as the Fourth Division - was renamed to the Third Division.)
2	Rotherham United (P)	42	22	11	9	70	37	+33	77	Promotion to the Second Division
3	Mansfield Town (P)	42	23	8	11	75	53	+22	77	Promotion to the Second Division
4	Blackpool (O, P)	42	22	10	10	71	45	+26	76	Qualification for the Fourth Division play-offs
5	Scunthorpe United	42	21	9	12	64	59	+5	72	Qualification for the Fourth Division play-offs

(C) Champions; (O) Play-off winners; (P) Promoted

=== FA Cup ===
Date	Round	Opponents	Result	Goalscorers	Attendance
16 November 1991	Round 1	Doncaster Rovers (H)	1–1	Davis 26'	7,076
27 November 1991	Replay	Doncaster Rovers (A)	3–1	Harper (2) 38', 50', Eli 86'	4,207
15 December 1991	Round 2	Rotherham United (H)	2–0	Conroy 59', Lancashire 83'	9,775
4 January 1992	Round 3	Derby County (H)	2–2	Harper 6', Eli 84'	18,772
25 January 1992	Replay	Derby County (A)	0–2		18,274

=== League Cup ===
Date	Round	Opponents	Result	Goalscorers	Attendance
20 August 1991	Round 1 First leg	Wigan Athletic (A)	1–3	Conroy 8'	2,286
27 August 1991	Round 1 Second leg	Wigan Athletic (H)	2–3	Patterson 47' (o.g.), Davis 79'	3,876

=== Football League Trophy ===
Date	Round	Opponents	Result	Goalscorers	Attendance
22 October 1991	Preliminary Round	Blackpool (A)	3–1	Francis 32', Eli (2) 36', 41'	2,805
19 November 1991	Preliminary Round	Doncaster Rovers (H)	2–0	Francis 28', Eli 44'	2,590
4 February 1992	Preliminary Round	Scarborough (H)	3–1	Conroy 56', Deary 63', Eli 87'	2,956
18 February 1992	Northern Quarter Final	Rotherham United (A)	1–1 (a.e.t.) (4 – 2p)	Francis 10'	2,578
17 March 1992	Northern Semi Final	Huddersfield Town (H)	2–0	Conroy 9' (pen.), Eli 24'	10,775
7 April 1992	Northern Final First Leg	Stockport County (H)	0–1		13,259
18 February 1992	Northern Final Second Leg	Stockport County (A)	1–2	Pender 22'	8,260 (2,900 away)
