= 1992–93 Burnley F.C. season =

English football club season

Burnley
1992–93 season
- Chairman: Frank Teasdale
- Manager: Jimmy Mullen
- Second Division: 13th
- League Cup: 1st Round
- FA Cup: 3rd Round
- Football League Trophy: Northern Quarter Final
- Top goalscorer: League: Adrian Heath (20); All: Adrian Heath (23)
- Highest home attendance: 19,061 v Sheffield United (12 January 1993)
- Lowest home attendance: 5,524 v Carlisle United (25 August 1992)
- Average home league attendance: 10,537

The 1992–93 season was Burnley's first season in the third tier of English football. They were managed by Jimmy Mullen in his first full season since he replaced Frank Casper during the 1991–1992 campaign.

== Appearances and goals ==
No.	Pos	Nat	Player	Total		Second Division		League Cup		FA Cup		FL Trophy	
No.	Pos	Nat	Player	Apps	Goals	Apps	Goals	Apps	Goals	Apps	Goals	Apps	Goals
	GK	(England) ENG	Marlon Beresford	51	0	44+0	0	0+0	0	5+0	0	2+0	0
	MF	(Northern Ireland) NIR	David Campbell	8	0	7+1	0	0+0	0	0+0	0	0+0	0
	FW	(Scotland) SCO	John Clayton	4	1	3+0	1	1+0	0	0+0	0	0+0	0
	FW	(Scotland) SCO	Mike Conroy	48	12	38+1	7	2+0	0	4+1	3	2+0	2
	DF	(England) ENG	Steve Davis	44	2	37+0	2	0+0	0	5+0	0	2+0	0
	MF	(England) ENG	John Deary	38	3	32+0	3	1+0	0	3+0	0	2+0	0
	MF	(England) ENG	Louie Donowa	6	0	4+0	0	0+0	0	0+0	0	2+0	0
	FW	(England) ENG	Roger Eli	15	0	2+9	0	0+0	0	1+2	0	1+0	0
	MF	(England) ENG	Andy Farrell	51	4	40+2	3	2+0	0	5+0	0	1+1	1
	FW	(England) ENG	John Francis	9	1	9+0	1	0+0	0	0+0	0	0+0	0
	MF	(England) ENG	Steve Harper	42	5	33+1	5	1+0	0	5+0	0	2+0	0
	MF	(England) ENG	Adrian Heath	50	23	43+0	20	0+1	0	5+0	3	1+0	0
	DF	(Scotland) SCO	Joe Jakub	41	0	31+1	0	2+0	0	5+0	0	2+0	0
	FW	(England) ENG	Graham Lancashire	3	0	2+1	0	0+0	0	0+0	0	0+0	0
	DF	(England) ENG	Ian Measham	48	0	39+0	0	2+0	0	5+0	0	2+0	0
	DF	(England) ENG	Mark Monington	34	3	22+9	2	0+0	0	1+1	1	0+1	0
	MF	(Republic of Ireland) IRL	Brian Mooney	6	0	6+0	0	0+0	0	0+0	0	0+0	0
	FW	(England) ENG	Robbie Painter	20	0	7+10	0	2+0	0	1+0	0	0+0	0
	MF	(England) ENG	Leigh Palin	1	0	1+0	0	0+0	0	0+0	0	0+0	0
	DF	(Republic of Ireland) IRL	John Pender	53	6	44+0	4	2+0	1	5+0	1	2+0	0
	MF	(Northern Ireland) NIR	Steve Penney	16	3	10+1	3	2+0	0	3+0	0	0+0	0
	MF	(England) ENG	Nick Pickering	4	0	4+0	0	0+0	0	0+0	0	0+0	0
	MF	(England) ENG	Adrian Randall	29	1	19+4	1	2+0	0	2+1	0	1+0	0
	FW	(England) ENG	Steve Slawson	5	2	5+0	2	0+0	0	0+0	0	0+0	0
	MF	(Northern Ireland) NIR	Danny Sonner	2	1	0+1	0	0+1	1	0+0	0	0+0	0
	DF	(England) ENG	Les Thompson	4	0	2+1	0	0+1	0	0+0	0	0+0	0
	GK	(England) ENG	David Williams	4	0	2+0	0	2+0	0	0+0	0	0+0	0
	DF	(England) ENG	Paul Wilson	20	0	20+0	0	0+0	0	0+0	0	0+0	0
	MF	(England) ENG	Mark Yates	2	0	0+1	0	1+0	0	0+0	0	0+0	0

== Transfers ==
=== In ===
Pos	Player	From	Fee	Date
MF	(Northern Ireland) Steve Penney	Heart of Midlothian	Free	July 1992
DF	(England) Les Thompson	Maidstone United	Free	July 1992
FW	(Scotland) John Clayton	FC Volendam	Free	August 1992
FW	(England) Adrian Heath	Stoke City	Free	21 August 1992
GK	(England) Marlon Beresford	Sheffield Wednesday	£95,000	28 August 1992
MF	(Republic of Ireland) Brian Mooney	Sunderland	Loan	September 1993
MF	(England) Leigh Palin	Hull City	Free	September 1993
MF	(England) Louie Donowa	Birmingham City	Loan	January 1993
DF	(England) Paul Wilson	Halifax Town	£50,000	1 February 1993
FW	(England) Steve Slawson	Notts County	Loan	February 1993
MF	(Northern Ireland) David Campbell	Rotherham United	Free	March 1993
MF	(England) Nick Pickering	Darlington	Free	March 1993
FW	(England) John Francis	Cambridge United	£70,000	25 March 1993

=== Out ===
Pos	Player	To	Fee	Date
	(England) Jamie Webster		Released	31 May 1993
MF	(Northern Ireland) Danny Sonner	SC Preußen Münster	Free	1 June 1993
MF	(England) Mark Yates	Doncaster Rovers	Free	1 August 1993
MF	(England) Steve Harper	Doncaster Rovers	Free	7 August 1993
MF	(England) Joe Jakub	Chester City	Free	12 August 1993
FW	(Scotland) Mike Conroy	Preston North End	£85,000	20 August 1993
FW	(England) Robbie Painter	Darlington	Free	16 September 1993
DF	(England) Ian Measham	Doncaster Rovers	Free	16 September 1993
FW	(England) Kevin Russell	Bournemouth	£125,000	3 March 1994

== Matches ==
=== Football League Second Division ===
Key

- In Result column, Burnley's score shown first
- H = Home match
- A = Away match
- pen. = Penalty kick
- o.g. = Own goal

Results

Date	Opponents	Result	Goalscorers	Attendance
15 August 1992	Swansea City (H)	1–0	Penney 67'	10,913
22 August 1992	Stockport County (A)	1–2	Heath 71'	4,953
29 August 1992	Rotherham United (H)	1–1	Deary 85'	9,684
5 September 1992	Chester City (A)	0–3		4,981
12 September 1992	Preston North End (A)	0–2		7,209
15 September 1992	Port Vale (H)	1–1	Monington 90'	8,556
19 September 1992	Mansfield Town (H)	1–0	Monington 32'	8,613
26 September 1992	Wigan Athletic (A)	1–1	Deary 89'	4,032
29 September 1992	Plymouth Argyle (H)	0–0		8,676
3 October 1992	West Bromwich Albion (H)	2–1	Harper 1', Conroy 53'	14,796
11 October 1992	Bradford City (A)	0–1		10,488
17 October 1992	Fulham (H)	5–2	Harper 12', Farrell 19', Penney 32', Heath 45', Conroy 65'	9,881
24 October 1992	Blackpool (A)	3–1	Harper 15', Farrell 28', Penney 44'	7,942
31 October 1992	Stoke City (H)	0–2		16,667
3 November 1992	Reading (H)	1–1	Harper 8'	8,382
7 November 1992	Hull City (A)	2–0	Heath (2) 45' 88'	5,751
21 November 1992	Huddersfield Town (H)	2–1	Deary 22', Clayton 45'	10,615
28 November 1992	Bolton Wanderers (A)	0–4		11,438
12 December 1992	Leyton Orient (H)	2–0	Bellamy 39' (o.g.), Heath 81'	8,882
19 December 1992	Exeter City (A)	2–2	Heath (2) 8', 43'	3,179
26 December 1992	Brighton & Hove Albion (A)	0–3		8,741
9 January 1993	Port Vale (A)	0–3		8,815
16 January 1993	Wigan Athletic (H)	0–1		9,154
23 January 1993	Mansfield Town (A)	1–1	Pender 23'	3,991
26 January 1993	Rotherham United (A)	1–0	Heath 78' (pen.)	4,989
30 January 1993	Stockport County (H)	1–1	Conroy 49'	11,229
5 February 1993	Swansea City (A)	1–1	Farrell 66'	4,973
13 February 1993	Chester City (H)	5–0	Conroy (2) 5', 20', Heath 21', Pender 45', Harper 79'	9,434
16 February 1993	Preston North End (H)	2–0	Heath (2) 45', 67'	12,648
20 February 1993	Plymouth Argyle (A)	2–1	Pender (2) 4', 86'	5,905
27 February 1993	Bradford City (H)	2–2	Slawson 22', McCarthy 90' (o.g.)	13,262
6 March 1993	West Bromwich Albion (A)	0–2		15,722
9 March 1993	Hartlepool United (A)	0–0		3,021
13 March 1993	Hull City (H)	2–0	Heath 42', Slawson 79'	9,974
16 March 1993	Bournemouth (H)	1–1	Conroy 14'	8,601
20 March 1993	Reading (A)	0–1		6,398
23 March 1993	Bolton Wanderers (H)	0–1		15,085
27 March 1993	Huddersfield Town (A)	1–1	Heath 13'	9,441
3 April 1993	Hartlepool United (H)	3–0	Heath (2) 14', 53', Davis 81'	8,226
6 April 1993	Leyton Orient (A)	2–3	Heath (2) 34', 82' (pen.)	4,236
10 April 1993	Brighton & Hove Albion (H)	1–3	Conroy 29'	9,424
13 April 1993	Bournemouth (A)	1–1	Davis 68'	4,456
17 April 1993	Exeter City (H)	3–1	Heath (2) 45', 86', Daniels 65' (o.g.)	7,332
24 April 1993	Fulham (A)	0–4		5,531
1 May 1993	Blackpool (H)	2–2	Heath 28', Francis 47'	12,475
8 May 1993	Stoke City (A)	1–1	Randall 39'	21,840

=== Final league position ===
Pos	Team	Pld	W	D	L	GF	GA	GD	Pts
11	Rotherham United	46	17	14	15	60	60	0	65
12	Fulham	46	16	17	13	57	55	+2	65
13	Burnley	46	15	16	15	57	59	−2	61
14	Plymouth Argyle	46	16	12	18	59	64	−5	60
15	Huddersfield Town	46	17	9	20	54	61	−7	60

Rules for classification: 1) Points; 2) Goals scored; 3) Goal difference

=== FA Cup ===
Date	Round	Opponents	Result	Goalscorers	Attendance
14 November 1992	Round 1	Scarborough (H)	2–1	Conroy 26', Curran 55' (o.g.)	8,359
5 December 1992	Round 2	Shrewsbury Town (H)	1–1	Conroy 69'	10,038
15 December 1992	Replay	Shrewsbury Town (A)	2–1	Pender 87', Conroy 90'	5,671
2 January 1993	Round 3	Sheffield United (A)	2–2	Heath (2) 18', 39'	23,041 (8,500 away)
12 January 1993	Replay	Sheffield United (H)	2–4	Heath 17', Monington 67'	19,061

=== League Cup ===
Date	Round	Opponents	Result	Goalscorers	Attendance
18 August 1992	Round 1 First leg	Carlisle United (A)	1–4	Sonner 85'	4,066
25 August 1992	Round 1 Second leg	Carlisle United (H)	1–1	Pender 51'	5,524

=== Football League Trophy ===
Date	Round	Opponents	Result	Goalscorers	Attendance
19 January 1993	Round 2	Blackpool (A)	3–1	Conroy (2) 62', 78', Farrell 76'	2,979
2 February 1993	Northern Quarter Final	Chesterfield (A)	0–3		3,314
