= Steve Harper (footballer, born 1969) =

English footballer

Personal information
- Full name: Steven James Harper
- Date of birth: 3 February 1969 (age 57)
- Place of birth: Newcastle-under-Lyme, England
- Height: 5 ft 10 in (1.78 m)
- Positions: Winger; full-back

Youth career
- 1985–1987: Port Vale

Senior career*
Years	Team	Apps	(Gls)
1987–1989	Port Vale	28	(2)
1989–1991	Preston North End	77	(10)
1991–1993	Burnley	69	(8)
1993–1996	Doncaster Rovers	65	(11)
1996–1999	Mansfield Town	160	(18)
1999–2001	Hull City	65	(4)
2001–2002	Darlington	40	(1)
2002–2003	Kidsgrove Athletic		
Total		504+	(54+)
- * Club domestic league appearances and goals

Steven James Harper (born 3 February 1969) is an English former footballer who scored 54 goals in 504 league games in a 15-year career in the Football League. He was a speedy winger, adept at dribbling the ball, transitioning into a full-back later in his career.

He began his professional career at Port Vale in June 1987 before he was sold to Preston North End for £35,000 in March 1989. He joined Burnley on a free transfer in July 1991 and helped the "Clarets" to win the Fourth Division title in 1991–92. He moved on to Doncaster Rovers in August 1993, before he was sold to Mansfield Town for a £20,000 fee in September 1995. He took a free transfer to Hull City in July 1999 before joining Darlington in February 2001. He left the Football League in 2002 and moved into non-League football with Kidsgrove Athletic. He later became a coach.

== Playing career ==
Harper graduated through Port Vale juniors to sign professional forms under manager John Rudge in June 1987. He played regular football for the start of the 1987–88 season, and scored his first goal on 5 September, in a 2–1 victory over York City at Vale Park. However, he lost his first-team place in January, and finished the campaign with two goals in 25 games. He made eight appearances for the "Valiants" in the 1988–89 season but fell out of favour and was sold to Third Division rivals Preston North End for £35,000 and 50% of any future transfer deal in March 1989. Preston were managed by former Port Vale boss John McGrath. Ironically, the "Lambs" lost to Vale in the play-offs at the end of the 1988–89 campaign. They then dropped to 19th in 1989–90 and 17th in 1990–91 under Les Chapman's stewardship.

Harper left Deepdale to join Fourth Division club Burnley on a free transfer in July 1991. He scored six goals in 48 games in 1991–92, as Frank Casper and Jimmy Mullen led the "Clarets" to promotion as champions. Harper scored five goals in 42 appearances in 1992–93 but departed Turf Moor after he was replaced by David Eyres and was given a free transfer to Doncaster Rovers in August 1993. Ian Atkins took "Donny" to 15th in the Third Division (previously called the Fourth Division) in 1993–94. He was then joined at Belle Vue by his former Burnley partner Ian Measham. Sammy Chung then led Rovers to ninth place in 1994–95.

Harper was sold to Andy King's Mansfield Town for a £20,000 fee in September 1995. During his time at Mansfield Town, Harper moved from attacking positions into a full-back role, becoming an established defender by 1997. The "Stags" finished in the lower half of the Third Division table in 1995–96. Steve Parkin then replaced King in the hot-seat at Field Mill, and instigated a minor revival. Harper scored two goals in 38 appearances in 1996–97, as Mansfield finished five points behind Cardiff City, who occupied the final play-off position. He scored five goals in 52 games in 1997–98, as the club again finished five points short of the play-off places. His goal tally included a 17-minute hat-trick on 21 February, in a 4–0 home win over Darlington. He then claimed six goals in 51 appearances in the 1998–99 campaign, as Mansfield came to within one place and four points of a play-off place. He missed just one league games in his final two seasons at the club.

He took a free transfer to Hull City in July 1999, where his former Preston strike partner Warren Joyce was now manager. Harper was used on both sides of the defence, although he generally played at right-back. He scored four goals in 38 games in the 1999–2000 campaign, as the "Tigers" posted a 14th-place finish. During Hull City's financial difficulties in early 2001, Harper was among several players who sought to terminate their contracts and subsequently left the club. New manager Brian Little allowed Harper to leave Boothferry Park on a free transfer to league rivals Darlington in February 2001. The "Quakers" finished four points above the bottom of the Football League in 2000–01 under the stewardship of Gary Bennett. Harper played 25 games in the 2001–02 campaign, scoring once against Leyton Orient, before he was allowed to leave Feethams by new manager Tommy Taylor. He then ended his career after a short spell with Northern Premier League side Kidsgrove Athletic.

== Coaching career ==
Harper spent six years as a coach at the academy at Stoke City, before he was appointed as a first-team coach at Chasetown in May 2017.

== Career statistics ==
Appearances and goals by club, season and competition
Club	Season	League			FA Cup		Other		Total	
Club	Season	Division	Apps	Goals	Apps	Goals	Apps	Goals	Apps	Goals
Port Vale	1987–88	Third Division	21	2	0	0	4	0	25	2
Port Vale	1988–89	Third Division	7	0	0	0	1	0	8	0
Port Vale	Total		28	2	0	0	5	0	33	2
Preston North End	1988–89	Third Division	5	0	0	0	0	0	5	0
Preston North End	1989–90	Third Division	36	10	2	0	3	0	41	10
Preston North End	1990–91	Third Division	36	0	1	0	5	1	42	1
Preston North End	Total		77	10	3	0	8	1	88	11
Burnley	1991–92	Fourth Division	35	3	5	3	9	1	49	7
Burnley	1992–93	Second Division	34	5	5	0	3	0	42	5
Burnley	Total		69	8	10	3	12	1	91	12
Doncaster Rovers	1993–94	Third Division	31	2	2	0	4	1	37	3
Doncaster Rovers	1994–95	Third Division	33	9	1	0	2	0	36	9
Doncaster Rovers	1995–96	Third Division	1	0	0	0	1	0	1	0
Doncaster Rovers	Total		65	11	3	0	7	1	75	12
Mansfield Town	1995–96	Third Division	29	5	2	1	2	0	33	6
Mansfield Town	1996–97	Third Division	40	2	2	0	3	0	45	2
Mansfield Town	1997–98	Third Division	46	5	2	0	4	0	52	5
Mansfield Town	1998–99	Third Division	45	6	2	0	4	0	51	6
Mansfield Town	Total		160	18	8	1	13	0	181	19
Hull City	1999–2000	Third Division	38	4	5	0	6	0	49	4
Hull City	2000–01	Third Division	27	0	2	0	2	0	31	0
Hull City	Total		65	4	7	0	8	0	80	4
Darlington	2000–01	Third Division	17	0	0	0	0	0	17	0
Darlington	2001–02	Third Division	23	1	0	0	2	0	25	1
Darlington	Total		40	1	0	0	2	0	42	1
Career total			504	54	31	4	55	3	590	61

== Honours ==
Burnley

- Football League Fourth Division: 1991–92
