= Nogan =

Nogan is a surname. Notable people with the surname include:

- Kurt Nogan (born 1970), Welsh footballer
- Lee Nogan (born 1969), Welsh footballer and manager, elder brother of the above
