= Steve Davis (footballer, born 1968) =

English footballer

Personal information
- Full name: Stephen Mark Davis
- Date of birth: 30 October 1968 (age 58)
- Place of birth: Hexham, England
- Height: 6 ft 2 in (1.88 m)
- Position: Centre back

Youth career
- 1986–1987: Southampton

Senior career*
Years	Team	Apps	(Gls)
1987–1991	Southampton	6	(0)
1989	→ Burnley (loan)	9	(0)
1990	→ Notts County (loan)	2	(0)
1991–1995	Burnley	162	(22)
1995–1998	Luton Town	138	(21)
1998–2003	Burnley	156	(21)
2003–2004	Blackpool	29	(1)
2004–2006	York City	15	(0)
Total		517	(65)

Managerial career
- 2007: Burnley (caretaker)
- 2010: Burnley (caretaker)
- * Club domestic league appearances and goals

Stephen Mark Davis (born 30 October 1968) is an English former footballer who played as a defender. He had three spells with Burnley, and has subsequently coached for them. He was the first team coach for EFL Championship side Bolton Wanderers but was sacked along with Owen Coyle on 9 October.

== Playing career ==
Davis was born in Hexham, but started his career as a trainee with Southampton in August 1986, turning professional in July 1987. He was a virtual ever-present in the reserve team in both the 1987–88 and 1988–89 seasons, making 35 appearances each time. Despite this, he failed to break through into the first team.

In November 1989 he went on loan to Burnley (who already had a player called Steve Davis) and returned to The Dell in February 1990. He made his Southampton debut in a 4–1 victory over Norwich City on 27 February 1990 (in which game Matthew Le Tissier scored a hat-trick). After a run of four games, Davis lost his place to Micky Adams, who was returning from injury. Davis only made two further appearances for Southampton, and then, after a short loan spell at Notts County, in August 1991 he returned to Burnley on a permanent basis for a fee of £60,000.

At Burnley he helped the club to the Division Four championship in 1991–92 and to promotion via the play-offs in 1993–94. Burnley were relegated the following season, and Davis was sold to Luton Town for £750,000 in July 1995.

In 1996, despite his performing admirably for the Hatters, the club were relegated to the Division Two for the first time in over 25 years. He was then part of the side that finished third in the league in the 1996–97 season, before losing in the play-offs to Crewe. Due to his aerial ability, Davis was often used as an emergency striker by then-manager Lennie Lawrence. During part of his spell at Luton, he was captain.

After over three years with Luton, Davis returned to Burnley in December 1998 for a fee of £800,000. He became club captain, and in 1999–00 he helped them back to the First Division, thus completing Stan Ternent's two-year rebuilding project.

He remained at Burnley until July 2003, when he moved on to Lancashire rivals Blackpool on a two-year deal. At Blackpool he scored once; in a 3–0 win at Wycombe Wanderers. He was an unused substitute in the final as Blackpool won the 2003–04 Football League Trophy. He joined York City in June 2004 on a two-year deal, however he retired from the game in 2005 and is now Head Scout for Fleetwood Town.

== Management career ==
Davis returned to Burnley in a scouting role in October 2005, as manager Steve Cotterill hoped to prepare him for a coaching role at the club at some level.

In January 2006 Burnley first team coach Mark Yates was offered the managers job at Conference side Kidderminster Harriers. This meant a step up for Steve Davis, who came in as a direct replacement for Yates, taking up the roles of first team coach and reserve team manager. The move was greeted with great support from Burnley fans, as Davis was still held in very high regard at Turf Moor. Davis shared the supporters' sentiment, quoting "This has to be top of my list for football memories. Burnley is my club and everyone knows what it means to me." Davis' quick rise would continue in November 2007 when he was moved up a rank once again by Cotterill, replacing the outgoing Dave Kevan (who had moved to a similar role at Notts County) as assistant manager. This role lasted just a matter of days, before he was promoted up to caretaker-manager upon the sacking of Cotterill. His first job was to take the team to Leicester City for a Football League Championship match. An early Andy Gray goal gave him a 1–0 win, in what he described as one of the proudest moments of his career. He was a candidate to replace Cotterill full-time as Burnley manager but in the end the board went for Scottish rookie Owen Coyle, however Davis would remain on the staff in his former role as first-team coach. Under Coyle's stewardship Burnley won promotion to the Premier League.

In January 2010, Davis was made caretaker manager of Burnley for a matter of days before joining the backroom staff at Coyle's new club, Bolton Wanderers. During this spell he never took charge of a first team game. He was sacked by the EFL Championship side on 9 October.

== Career statistics ==
Appearances and goals by club, season and competition
Club	Season	League			FA Cup		League Cup		Other		Total	
Club	Season	Division	Apps	Goals	Apps	Goals	Apps	Goals	Apps	Goals	Apps	Goals
Southampton
Southampton	1989–90	First Division	4	0	0	0	0	0	—		4	0
Southampton	1990–91	First Division	2	0	0	0	0	0	—		2	0
Southampton	Total		6	0	0	0	0	0	0	0	6	0
Burnley (loan)	1989–90	Fourth Division	9	0	0	0	0	0	—		9	0
Notts County (loan)	1990–91	Second Division	2	0	0	0	0	0	—		2	0
Burnley
Burnley	1991–92	Fourth Division	40	6	5	1	2	1	6 (Note: Appearances in EFL Trophy)	0	53	8
Burnley	1992–93	Third Division	37	2	5	0	0	0	2	0	44	2
Burnley	1993–94	Third Division	42	7	4	0	4	1	5 (Note: Appearances in EFL Trophy and play-offs)	0	55	8
Burnley	1994–95	Second Division	43	7	4	0	4	0	—		51	7
Burnley	Total		162	22	18	1	10	2	13	0	203	25
Luton Town
Luton Town	1995–96	First Division	36	2	1	0	5	1	4 (Note: Appearances in Anglo-Italian Cup)	0	46	3
Luton Town	1996–97	Second Division	44	8	4	0	6	0	2 (Note: Appearances in play-offs)	1	56	9
Luton Town	1997–98	Second Division	38	5	0	0	4	1	2	0	44	6
Luton Town	1998–99	Second Division	20	6	2	2	6	2	0	0	28	10
Luton Town	Total		138	21	7	2	21	4	8	1	174	28
Burnley
Burnley	1998–99	Second Division	19	4	0	0	0	0	—		19	4
Burnley	1999–2000	Second Division	42	7	4	0	1	0	1	0	48	7
Burnley	2000–01	First Division	44	5	2	0	4	1	—		50	6
Burnley	2001–02	First Division	23	1	0	0	1	0	—		24	1
Burnley	2002–03	First Division	28	4	1	0	3	1	—		32	5
Burnley	Total		156	21	7	0	9	2	1	0	173	23
Blackpool	2003–04	Second Division	29	1	3	0	3	0	2	0	37	1
York City	2004–05	Conference	15	0	0	0	0	0	—		15	0
Career total			517	65	35	3	43	8	24	1	619	77

== Honours ==
Burnley

- Football League Second Division play-offs: 1994
- Football League Fourth Division: 1991–92

Blackpool

- Football League Trophy: 2003–04

Individual

- PFA Team of the Year: 1991–92 Fourth Division, 1996–97 Second Division, 1998–99 Second Division, 1999–2000 Second Division
