= Jason Hardy =

English footballer

Personal information
- Full name: Jason Paul Hardy
- Date of birth: 14 December 1969 (age 56)
- Place of birth: Burnley, England
- Height: 5 ft 10 in (1.78 m)
- Position: Defender

Senior career*
Years	Team	Apps	(Gls)
1986–1992	Burnley	43	(1)
1992	→ Halifax Town (loan)	4	(0)
1992–1993	Halifax Town	22	(2)
1993–1995	Prestwich Heys	?	(?)
1995–1996	Rochdale	7	(0)
- * Club domestic league appearances and goals

Jason Paul Hardy (born 14 December 1969) is an English retired professional association footballer who played as a defender. He started with Burnley, making his professional debut in the 0–1 defeat to Aldershot on 21 March 1987.

After leaving Rochdale he signed for Salford City.
