= Ian Patterson (footballer) =

English footballer

Personal information
- Full name: Ian Daniel Patterson
- Date of birth: 4 April 1973 (age 53)
- Place of birth: Chatham, England
- Height: 6 ft 0 in (1.83 m)
- Position: Defender

Senior career*
Years	Team	Apps	(Gls)
1992–1993	Sunderland	0	(0)
1893–1994	Burnley	1	(0)
1994	Wigan Athletic	4	(0)
	Stalybridge Celtic	?	(?)
- * Club domestic league appearances and goals

Ian Daniel Patterson (born 4 April 1973) is an English former professional footballer who played as a central defender.

Born in Chatham, Kent, Patterson started his career at Sunderland before moving to Burnley on a free transfer at the start of the 1993–94 season. He debuted against Bristol Rovers in September 1993, but did not make another appearance for the first team. He moved to Wigan Athletic in March 1994, making four appearances before being released at the end of the season.
