= John Borland =

English former professional footballer who played as a midfielder

Personal information
- Full name: John Robert Borland
- Date of birth: 28 January 1977 (age 49)
- Place of birth: Lancaster, England
- Position: Midfielder

Youth career
- Preston North End

Senior career*
Years	Team	Apps	(Gls)
1995–1996	Burnley	1	(0)
1996–1997	Scunthorpe United	2	(0)
1997–1999	Accrington Stanley	?	(?)
1999–2001	Rossendale United	?	(?)
2004	Colne	?	(?)
2004–2005	Chorley	?	(?)
2005–2006	Liversedge	?	(?)
2006–2009	Brigg Town	?	(?)
- * Club domestic league appearances and goals

John Robert Borland (born 28 January 1977) is an English former professional footballer who played as a midfielder. He made a total of three appearances in the Football League for Burnley and Scunthorpe United before moving into non-League football.

== Career ==
As a youngster, Borland spent five years with Preston North End in the club's Centre of Excellence. He later joined Burnley, where he captained the youth team in the victory over Manchester City in the final of the Lancashire FA Youth Cup in 1995. The same summer he was awarded his first professional contract and he made his senior debut for the club in the League Cup tie against Mansfield Town on 15 August 1995. Borland played his only league match for Burnley the following month, covering for the unavailable Adrian Randall in the 1–1 draw away at York City. His last appearance for the Lancashire side came as a substitute in the 1–3 home defeat to Walsall in the first round of the FA Cup on 10 November 1995.

Borland was placed on the transfer list by Burnley manager Adrian Heath in the summer of 1996 and subsequently joined Third Division outfit Scunthorpe United on a free transfer. He made his debut for the side on 14 September, coming on as a substitute for Mark Gavin in the 0–1 loss against Cardiff City. Borland again struggled to break into the first team and played only once more for Scunthorpe before being released at the end of the season. A career in non-league football followed; he signed for Accrington Stanley ahead of the 1997–98 season and spent 18 months with the club before being released after the arrival of new manager Wayne Harrison in January 1999. After spending several months without a club, Borland joined North West Counties League side Rossendale United along with fellow former Accrington players Glenn Little and Paul Daughtry. Borland was a regular starter for Rossendale during his first year at the club, but then suffered a back injury which limited his appearances and eventually forced him to announce his retirement from football in November 2001.

During the next three years, Borland played amateur football in the West Riding League before returning to the semi-professional game with Colne, signing for the club along with ex-Burnley forward Andy Payton during the 2004 close season. However, his stay at Holt House was brief as he joined Northern Premier League First Division side Chorley two months into the campaign. He left the club the following summer and spent the 2005–06 season as captain of Liversedge. Borland signed for Brigg Town in August 2006 after training with the team during the pre-season, and remained with the club until the end of the 2008–09 campaign.

== Professional statistics ==
Appearances and goals by club, season and competition
Club	Season	League			FA Cup		League Cup		Total	
Club	Season	Division	Apps	Goals	Apps	Goals	Apps	Goals	Apps	Goals
Burnley	1995–96	Second Division	1	0	1	0	2	0	4	0
Scunthorpe United	1996–97	Third Division	2	0	0	0	0	0	2	0
Career totals			3	0	1	0	2	0	6	0
