= Franny Powell =

English footballer

Personal information
- Full name: Francis Michael Powell
- Date of birth: 17 June 1977 (age 49)
- Place of birth: Burnley, England
- Height: 6 ft 2 in (1.88 m)
- Position: Winger

Senior career*
| Years | Team | Apps | (Gls) |
| 1994–1995 | Burnley | 0 | (0) |
| 1995–1996 | Rochdale | 2 | (0) |
| 1996–1998 | Southport | 2 | (0) |
| Total | | 4 | (0) |
- * Club domestic league appearances and goals

Francis Michael Powell (born 17 June 1977) is an English former professional footballer who played as a winger in the Football League.
