= Paul McKenzie (footballer, born 1969) =

Scottish footballer

Personal information
- Full name: Paul Andrew McKenzie
- Date of birth: 4 October 1969 (age 57)
- Place of birth: Aberdeen, Scotland
- Position: Midfielder

Senior career*
Years	Team	Apps	(Gls)
1987–1988	Sunderland	0	(0)
1988–1992	Peterhead	?	(?)
1992–1994	Burnley	4	(0)
1994–1996	Inverness Caledonian Thistle	26	(4)
- * Club domestic league appearances and goals

Paul McKenzie (born 4 October 1969) is a Scottish retired professional footballer who played as a midfielder. He played four matches in the English Football League with Burnley, and had spells in the Highland Football League with Peterhead and the Scottish Football League with Inverness Caledonian Thistle. His Burnley debut came on 7 April 1992, when he replaced Ian Bray in the 0–1 defeat to Stockport County in the first leg of the Associate Members' Cup semi-final.
