= Chris Vinnicombe =

English footballer

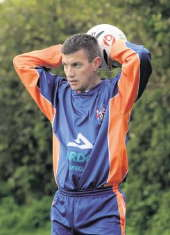
- Vinnicombe playing for Witheridge

Personal information
- Full name: Christopher Vinnicombe
- Date of birth: 20 October 1970 (age 56)
- Place of birth: Exeter, England
- Position: Left back

Youth career
- 1986–1989: Exeter City

Senior career*
Years	Team	Apps	(Gls)
1989	Exeter City	46	(2)
1989–1994	Rangers	27	(0)
1994–1998	Burnley	114	(4)
1998–2004	Wycombe Wanderers	264	(2)
2004–2005	Tiverton Town	48	(3)
2005–2006	Exeter City	4	(0)
2006–2008	Tiverton Town	83	(5)
2008–2010	Witheridge	78	(3)
Total		664	(19)

International career
1990–1991	England U21	12	(0)

Managerial career
- 2008–2010: Witheridge
- 2010–2010: Tiverton Town
- 2010–2012: Elmore F.C.
- 2012–2016: Witheridge
- * Club domestic league appearances and goals

Chris Vinnicombe (born 20 October 1970) is an English former professional footballer.

== Club career ==
=== Exeter City and Rangers (1986–1994) ===
Vinnicombe was a product of Exeter City's youth system, and made his professional debut for the club in 1989. After just four months with his first club, Scottish giants Rangers paid £150,000 for Vinnicombe on 3 November 1989.

He won a Scottish league winners' medal in 1991, but over the next few years found it harder to break into the Rangers first team. On 30 June 1994, after only 27 appearances in nearly five years, he joined Burnley for £200,000.

=== Burnley and Wycombe Wanderers (1994–2004) ===
Vinnicombe spent four years at Burnley, making 114 appearances and scoring four goals, before moving on to Wycombe Wanderers in the summer of 1998 on a free transfer.

After a slow start at Adams Park, Vinnicombe became a successful player at Wycombe, and under Lawrie Sanchez became the club's first choice left-back. He featured in the club's remarkable run to the FA Cup semi-final in 2001 and the following year he was voted "Supporters' Player of the Year". After Wycombe's relegation from the Second Division in 2004, new manager Tony Adams decided to clear out much of the existing team, and after making over 250 appearances, Vinnicombe was one of the players to leave, on 1 July.

=== Tiverton Town, Exeter City and Tiverton Town again (2004–2008) ===
Upon being released from Wanderers, Vinnicombe returned to Devon, joining non-league side Tiverton Town for a year before returning to St. James' Park on 12 August 2005. Since his return he was largely on the fringes of Exeter's first-team and he was released on 31 May 2006 after only 3 appearances in the whole season.

Chris returned to Tiverton in 2006 for his second attempt with the club. During this time he also took charge of the Tiverton Town academy, a programme set up in association with the East Devon College which is based in Tiverton. He was voted the "Manager's Player of the Year" for the 2006–07 season and received the titles of "Travel Club Player of the Year", "Supporters' Player of the Year" and "WWW Player of the Year" in the subsequent season. By the beginning of the 2008–09 season, Vinnicombe was the manager of the Tiverton Under-18s squad.

== Managerial career ==
=== Witheridge (2008–2010) ===
Vinnicombe joined Witheridge, who are in the South-West Peninsula Premier Division, in 2008 as player-manager taking charge at a time when Witheridge were struggling at the foot of the table but under Vinnicombe's guidance managed to finish the season in 11th place.

Vinnicombe resigned as Witheridge manager on 3 June 2010 with speculation rife that he was about to be unveiled as the new Tiverton Town manager.

=== Tiverton Town (2010) ===
Vinnicombe was unveiled as the new Tiverton Town manager on 7 June 2010 after resigning as the Witheridge boss.

The club released a statement on their official website saying the following: The club are delighted to confirm that Chris Vinnicombe has been appointed as Manager. Vinny said he was really looking forward to the new season, but his first job was to put in place his number two. He hoped to get this position filled quickly so he can then start speaking to the current squad of players.

The former Rangers defender handed in his notice at Edge Down Park in early June making it appear inevitable that he will be introduced as the new Yellows chief. It is believed that one of the former Exeter City man's first tasks in charge will be to appoint Mark Saunders as his assistant manager.

On 23 November 2010, Vinnicombe stepped down as manager of Tiverton Town by mutual agreement, after several talks with the Ladysmead board of directors. The following message appeared on the club's website: By mutual agreement Chris Vinnicombe has stepped down as Tiverton Manager with immediate effect. Mark Saunders will be in temporary control of the team.

=== Elmore 2010–2012 ===
In December 2010, Vinnicombe took over as manager of another Tiverton based team, Elmore F.C. of the Western Football League. He left Elmore in February 2012 by mutual consent.

=== Witheridge 2012–2016 ===
After leaving Elmore, Vinnicombe returned to Witheridge F.C. as a player until the end of the 2011–12 season. At the start of the 2012–13 season, Vinnicombe was appointed as an assistant to then manager Mike Taylor, however when Taylor resigned as manager in November 2012 after an indifferent start to the season he was promoted to manager and began his second reign as boss at Witheridge which culminated in the club finishing the season in 7th place which he then beat during the 2013–14 season when he guided the team to a 6th-place finish which allowed the club to enter the FA Cup for the first time in their history. He left the club in the summer of 2016.

== International career ==
Vinnicombe played for the England under-21 in the 1991 team, for whom he won 12 caps, some of which were as captain.

== Honours ==
Exeter City

- Football League Fourth Division: 1989–90
