= 1994 Football League play-offs =

Football League play-offs
- Season: 1993–94
- Champions: Leicester City (First Division); Burnley (Second Division); Wycombe Wanderers (Third Division)
- Matches: 15
- Goals: 38 (2.53 per match)
- Biggest home win: Preston 4–1 Torquay (Third Division)
- Biggest away win: Millwall 1–3 Derby (First Division); Plymouth 1–3 Burnley (Second Division)
- Highest scoring: Preston 2–4 Wycombe (6 goals)
- Highest attendance: 73,671 – Derby v Leicester (First Division final)
- Lowest attendance: 4,440 – Torquay v Preston (Third Division semi-final)
- Average attendance: 20,348

The Football League play-offs for the 1993–94 season were held in May 1994, with the finals taking place at Wembley Stadium in London. The play-off semi-finals were played over two legs and were contested by the teams who finished in 3rd, 4th, 5th and 6th place in the Football League First Division and Football League Second Division and the 4th, 5th, 6th and 7th placed teams in the Football League Third Division table. The winners of the semi-finals progressed through to the finals, with the winner of these matches gaining promotion for the following season.

== Background ==
The Football League play-offs have been held every year since 1987. They take place for each division following the conclusion of the regular season and are contested by the four clubs finishing below the automatic promotion places.

== First Division ==
Pos	Team	Pld	W	D	L	GF	GA	GD	Pts
3	Millwall	46	19	17	10	58	49	+9	74
4	Leicester City	46	19	16	11	72	59	+13	73
5	Tranmere Rovers	46	21	9	16	69	53	+16	72
6	Derby County	46	20	11	15	73	68	+5	71

After just missing out on the playoffs a year earlier, Millwall made a stronger challenge for promotion to the Premier League this time around, finishing third and qualifying for the playoffs. Leicester City, beaten finalists in the previous two seasons, qualified for the playoffs by finishing fourth. Tranmere Rovers, who had just missed out on a place in the League Cup final, made another strong challenge in the league and qualified for the playoffs for the second season running. The final playoff place went to Derby County.

The final ended up being an East Midlands clash as Leicester and Derby won in the semi-finals, and Leicester secured promotion after seven years outside the flight by winning the final 2-1 with both of their goals coming from long-serving Steve Walsh. The final was Leicester's seventh appearance at Wembley but the first game they had won there.

=== Semi-finals ===
First leg

15 May 1994
15:00

Tranmere Rovers	0–0	Leicester City

Prenton Park, Birkenhead
Attendance: 14,962
Referee: Terry Holbrook

15 May 1994
15:05

Derby County	2–0	Millwall
Cowans 22'; Johnson 60'

Baseball Ground, Derby
Attendance: 17,401
Referee: Paul Durkin

Second leg

18 May 1994
19:45

Leicester City	2–1	Tranmere Rovers
Ormondroyd 45'; Speedie 86'		Nevin 46'

Filbert Street, Leicester
Attendance: 16,470
Referee: Keith Cooper

Leicester City won 2–1 on aggregate.

18 May 1994
19:45

Millwall	1–3	Derby County
Berry 63'		Gabbiadini 16'; Johnson 22'; Van Den Hauwe 42' (o.g.)

The New Den, London
Attendance: 13,999
Referee: Brian Hill

Derby County won 5–1 on aggregate.

=== Final ===
30 May 1994
15:00

Derby County	1–2	Leicester City
Johnson 27'		Walsh 41', 87'

Wembley Stadium, London
Attendance: 73,671
Referee: Roger Milford

== Second Division ==
Pos	Team	Pld	W	D	L	GF	GA	GD	Pts
3	Plymouth Argyle	46	25	10	11	88	56	+32	85
4	Stockport County	46	24	13	9	74	44	+30	85
5	York City	46	21	12	13	64	40	+24	75
6	Burnley	46	21	10	15	79	58	+21	73

=== Semi-finals ===
First leg

15 May 1994
15:00

Burnley	0–0	Plymouth Argyle

Turf Moor, Burnley
Attendance: 18,794
Referee: Keith Cooper

15 May 1994
15:00

York City	0–0	Stockport County

Bootham Crescent, York
Attendance: 8,744
Referee: Joe Worrall

Second leg

18 May 1994
19:30

Stockport County	1–0	York City
Beaumont 85'

Edgeley Park, Stockport
Attendance: 6,743
Referee: Roger Milford

Stockport County won 1–0 on aggregate.

18 May 1994
19:45

Plymouth Argyle	1–3	Burnley
Marshall 15'		Francis 29', 31'; Joyce 81'

Home Park, Plymouth
Attendance: 17,515
Referee: Terry Holbrook

Burnley won 3–1 on aggregate.

=== Final ===
29 May 1994
15:00

Burnley	2–1	Stockport County
Eyres 28'; Parkinson 65'		Beaumont 2'

Wembley Stadium, London
Attendance: 44,806
Referee: David Elleray

== Third Division ==
Pos	Team	Pld	W	D	L	GF	GA	GD	Pts
4	Wycombe Wanderers	42	19	13	10	67	53	+14	70
5	Preston North End	42	18	13	11	79	60	+19	67
6	Torquay United	42	17	16	9	64	56	+8	67
7	Carlisle United	42	18	10	14	57	42	+15	64

=== Semi-finals ===
First leg

15 May 1994
13:30

Torquay United	2–0	Preston North End
Darby 20'; Moore 57'

Plainmoor, Torquay
Attendance: 4,440
Referee: Roger Milford

15 May 1994
15:00

Carlisle United	0–2	Wycombe Wanderers
		Thompson 33'; Garner 86'

Brunton Park, Carlisle
Attendance: 10,862
Referee: Brian Hill

Second leg

18 May 1994
19:45

Preston North End	4–1 (a.e.t.)	Torquay United
Ellis 8'; Moyes 43'; Hicks 52'; Raynor 116'		Goodridge 15'

Deepdale, Preston
Attendance: 11,442

Preston North End won 4–3 on aggregate.

18 May 1994
19:45

Wycombe Wanderers	2–1	Carlisle United
Carroll 12'; Garner 58'		Davey 81' (pen.)

Adams Park, High Wycombe
Attendance: 5,265
Referee: Paul Durkin

Wycombe Wanderers won 4–1 on aggregate.

=== Final ===
28 May 1994
15:00

Preston North End	2–4	Wycombe Wanderers
Bryson 32'; Raynor 37'		Squires 33' (o.g.); Garner 47'; Carroll 57', 72'

Wembley Stadium, London
Attendance: 40,109
Referee: Keith Cooper
