= Mark Winstanley =

English footballer

Personal information
- Full name: Mark Andrew Winstanley
- Date of birth: 22 January 1968 (age 58)
- Place of birth: St Helens, England
- Position: Defender

Senior career*
Years	Team	Apps	(Gls)
1986–1994	Bolton Wanderers	215	(5)
1994–1999	Burnley	151	(5)
1998	Shrewsbury Town (loan)	8	(0)
1998	Scunthorpe United (loan)	?	(?)
1999	Preston North End (loan)	?	(?)
1999–2000	Shrewsbury Town	32	(1)
2000–2002	Carlisle United	62	(9)
2002–2003	Southport	23	(0)
- * Club domestic league appearances and goals

Mark Andrew Winstanley (born 22 January 1968) is an English former professional footballer who played as a central defender.

== Career ==
Winstanley began his career at Bolton Wanderers, making his debut under then manager Phil Neal. He played on the winning side at Wembley in 1989 in the Football League Trophy final. He was instrumental in Bolton's cup-runs of the early nineties and saw the club back into the second tier of English football in 1993. He then moved on to Burnley where he also made over 100 appearances, before playing for a string of other clubs in the lower divisions, and finishing his career with non-league Southport.

In April 2020, he told The Bolton News that he had a life saving bone marrow transplant operation for leukaemia after being diagnosed in 2018.

== Honours ==
Bolton Wanderers

- Associate Members' Cup: 1988–89
