= Liam Robinson (footballer) =

English footballer (born 1965)

Personal information
- Full name: Spencer Liam Robinson
- Date of birth: 29 December 1965 (age 60)
- Place of birth: Bradford, England
- Height: 5 ft 6 in (1.68 m)
- Position: Striker

Senior career*
Years	Team	Apps	(Gls)
1982–1983	Nottingham Forest	0	(0)
1983–1986	Huddersfield Town	21	(2)
1986	→ Tranmere Rovers (loan)	4	(3)
1986–1993	Bury	262	(89)
1993–1994	Bristol City	41	(4)
1994–1997	Burnley	63	(9)
1997–1999	Scarborough	65	(7)
1999	Northwich Victoria		
2000	Stalybridge Celtic		
2000–2002	Stocksbridge Park Steels		
2002–200x	Queensbury		
2003	Harrogate Railway		
2003–200x	Eccleshill United		
2004–200x	Rossendale United		
- * Club domestic league appearances and goals

Spencer Liam Robinson (born 29 December 1965) is an English former professional footballer who played as a striker in the Football League for Huddersfield Town, Tranmere Rovers, Bury, Bristol City, Burnley and Scarborough. He began his career as an apprentice with Nottingham Forest, but never played for the first team, and after Scarborough he played non-league football for teams including Northwich Victoria, Stalybridge Celtic, Stocksbridge Park Steels, Queensbury, Harrogate Railway, Eccleshill United and Rossendale United.
