= David Williams (footballer, born 1968) =

English footballer

Personal information
- Full name: David Peter Williams
- Date of birth: 18 September 1968 (age 58)
- Place of birth: Liverpool, England
- Position: Goalkeeper

Senior career*
| Years | Team | Apps | (Gls) |
| 1987–1988 | Oldham Athletic | 0 | (0) |
| 1988–1993 | Burnley | 24 | (0) |
| 1991–1992 | → Rochdale (loan) | 6 | (0) |
| 1994–1996 | Cardiff City | 82 | (0) |
| 1996–1997 | Stalybridge Celtic | 20 | (0) |
| 1997 | Ebbw Vale | 11 | (0) |
| 1997–2000 | Bangor City | 47 | (0) |
| 2000–2001 | Rhyl | 11 | (0) |
| 2001–2002 | Caenarfon Town | 10 | (0) |
| 2002–2003 | Rhyl | 13 | (0) |
| Total | | 112 | (0) |
- * Club domestic league appearances and goals

David Peter Williams (born 18 September 1968) is an English former professional footballer who played as a goalkeeper.

He made 112 appearances in the Football League, and then played English non-league football for Stalybridge Celtic and in Wales for several clubs.
