= Wayne Dowell =

English footballer

Personal information
- Full name: Wayne Anthony Dowell
- Date of birth: 28 December 1973 (age 52)
- Place of birth: Easington, England
- Height: 5 ft 10 in (1.78 m)
- Position: Full back

Senior career*
Years	Team	Apps	(Gls)
1994–1996	Burnley	6	(0)
1996	→ Carlisle United (loan)	7	(0)
1996–1997	Rochdale	5	(0)
1997	Doncaster Rovers	1	(0)
1997–199?	Northwich Victoria	1	(0)
199?–1999	Accrington Stanley		
1999–????	Barrow		
- * Club domestic league appearances and goals

Wayne Anthony Dowell (born 28 December 1973) is an English former professional footballer who played as a left back. He made appearances in the Football League for Burnley, Carlisle United, Rochdale, and Doncaster Rovers.
