= Paul Smith (footballer, born 22 January 1976) =

English footballer

Personal information
- Full name: Ian Paul Smith
- Date of birth: 22 January 1976 (age 50)
- Place of birth: Easington, England
- Positions: Midfielder; defender

Senior career*
Years	Team	Apps	(Gls)
1994–2001	Burnley	112	(5)
2000	→ Oldham Athletic (loan)	4	(0)
2001–2003	Hartlepool United	55	(4)
2003–2005	Sheffield Wednesday	27	(2)
2006	Alfreton Town		
2006	Kidderminster Harriers	3	(0)
2007–2010	Sheffield		
2010–????	Hucknall Town	0	(0)
- * Club domestic league appearances and goals as of 11:55, 22 July 2010 (UTC)

Ian Paul Smith (born 22 January 1976) is an English footballer who played in the Football League for Burnley, Oldham Athletic, Hartlepool United and Sheffield Wednesday.

== Career ==
Smith turned professional in July 1992 with Burnley. He was subject of multimillion-pound bids from Arsenal, West Ham United, Aston Villa, Liverpool and Everton and was widely considered to have the best left foot outside the Premier League. Smith joined Hartlepool United on a free transfer in November 2001. He quickly settled in as a first team regular, topping the Division's assists charts (with 37) as Hartlepool reached the Division Three play-offs. He rejoined former Hartlepool manager Chris Turner as he moved to Sheffield Wednesday when his Hartlepool contract expired at the end of the 2002–03 season, after helping the club to promotion. He scored a goal on his second substitute appearance and a 20-yard volley on his full debut, but the knee injury which deprived him of the chance to face off against his former team in the play-off final, forced his retirement from professional football. He was released shortly after Wednesday won promotion to the Football League Championship.

In January 2006 he played a few games for Conference North club Alfreton Town, from where he joined Conference National side Kidderminster Harriers in February, but made just three substitute appearances for Harriers before leaving in the summer of 2006. He signed for Sheffield F.C. in the summer of 2007, swept the board of player-of-the-year awards for the 2008–09 season, and left the club in January 2010. He joined Hucknall Town in June 2010.

== Personal life ==
After finishing his playing career, Smith began a career in human resources and is a director of workforce planning for the NHS.
