= Kurt Nogan =

Welsh footballer

Personal information
- Full name: Kurt Nogan
- Date of birth: 9 September 1970 (age 56)
- Place of birth: Cardiff, Wales
- Position: Striker

Youth career
- 1986–88: Luton Town

Senior career*
Years	Team	Apps	(Gls)
1989–1992	Luton Town	33	(3)
1992	Peterborough United	0	(0)
1992–1995	Brighton & Hove Albion	97	(49)
1995–1997	Burnley	92	(33)
1997–2000	Preston North End	93	(27)
2000–2001	Cardiff City	18	(1)
2001–?	Tiverton Town	0	(0)

International career
1990–1991	Wales U21	2	(0)
- * Club domestic league appearances and goals

Kurt Nogan (born 9 September 1970) is a Welsh footballer. He is normally a centre forward but has been used as an attacking right midfielder, and is the younger brother of fellow footballer Lee Nogan. He had a long career with a number of Football League clubs (playing over 300 games), including Luton Town, Brighton and Hove Albion, Burnley, Preston North End and Cardiff City.

== Career ==
Born in Cardiff, Wales, he arrived at Burnley in February 1995 where he made 108 appearances scoring 42 goals. He made his debut for Preston North End in March 1997 and went on to make 106 appearances, scoring 31 goals before moving on to his home town club Cardiff City, where his only goal was a dramatic late winner against Hartlepool United. He was forced to retire from the professional game in 2001 because of injury. The highlight of Nogan's career was scoring two goals to put Preston North End 2–0 up in an FA Cup tie with holders Arsenal. However, Arsenal came back to win the game 4–2.

In December 2007 he played with Welsh Football League side ENTO Aberaman Athletic. He also took part in Cardiff City's campaign in the 2008 Screwfix Western Masters competition.

== Honours ==
Individual

- PFA Team of the Year: 1995–96 Second Division
