= Nathan Peel =

English footballer

Personal information
- Full name: Nathan James Peel
- Date of birth: 17 May 1972 (age 54)
- Place of birth: Blackburn, England
- Height: 6 ft 1 in (1.85 m)
- Position: Striker

Senior career*
Years	Team	Apps	(Gls)
1990–1991	Preston North End	10	(1)
1991–1993	Sheffield United	1	(0)
1992–1993	→ Halifax Town (loan)	3	(0)
1993–1996	Burnley	16	(2)
1995	→ Rotherham United (loan)	9	(4)
1995	→ Mansfield Town (loan)	2	(0)
1996	→ Doncaster Rovers (loan)	2	(0)
1996–1997	Rotherham United	0	(0)
1997–1998	Macclesfield Town	14	(3)
1998–1999	Winsford United	?	(?)
1998–1999	→ Stevenage Borough (loan)	5	(0)
1999–2000	Northwich Victoria	7	(0)
2000–2001	Barrow	36	(7)
2001	Droylsden	?	(?)
2001	Barrow	4	(0)
2001	Clitheroe	?	(?)
- * Club domestic league appearances and goals

Nathan James Peel (born 17 May 1972) is an English former professional footballer who played as a striker.

Nathan Peel now works at Peninsula Grammar School in Mount Eliza.
