= Wayne Russell =

Welsh footballer

Personal information
- Full name: Wayne Leonard Russell
- Date of birth: 29 November 1967 (age 58)
- Place of birth: Cardiff, Wales
- Position: Goalkeeper

Senior career*
Years	Team	Apps	(Gls)
1992–1993	Ebbw Vale	41	(0)
1993–1997	Burnley	24	(0)
1997	Ebbw Vale	3	(0)
1997–1999	Glentoran		
1999–2002	Bohemians		
2002–2003	Waterford United		
2003–2004	Derry City		
2005	Waterford United		
- * Club domestic league appearances and goals

Wayne Leonard Russell (born 29 November 1967) is a Welsh former football player who played during the 1990s and early 2000s.
