= John Pender (footballer) =

Irish footballer

Personal information
- Full name: John Patrick Pender
- Date of birth: 19 November 1963 (age 62)
- Place of birth: Luton, England
- Height: 5 ft 8 in (1.73 m)
- Position: Defender

Youth career
- –1982: Wolverhampton Wanderers

Senior career*
Years	Team	Apps	(Gls)
1982–1985	Wolverhampton Wanderers	117	(3)
1985–1987	Charlton Athletic	41	(0)
1987–1990	Bristol City	83	(3)
1990–1995	Burnley	171	(8)
1995–1997	Wigan Athletic	70	(1)
1997–1998	Rochdale	14	(0)
Total		496	(15)

International career
1983–1985	Republic of Ireland U21	5	(0)
- * Club domestic league appearances and goals

John Patrick Pender (born 19 November 1963) is an Irish retired professional footballer who played as a central defender.

== Career ==
Born in Luton, Pender made his professional debut for Wolverhampton Wanderers against Swansea City in March 1982, aged 18. During his career at Wolves, he helped the team win promotion to the First Division in 1982–83, and was capped five times by the Republic of Ireland under-21 side.

Pender moved to Charlton Athletic in 1985, once again earning promotion to the First Division in 1985–86, before joining Bristol City in 1987.

In 1990, Pender joined Burnley for a fee of £70,000. At Burnley, he was part of the squad that won the Fourth Division in 1991–92, and also played in the 2–1 win against Stockport County in the 1994 Second Division play-off final. He is one of only two Burnley captains to have led the side to two promotions, the other being Martin Dobson.

In August 1995, Pender joined Wigan Athletic for a "five-figure" fee. He helped the club win the Third Division in 1996–97.

In 1997 he was signed by Rochdale for a fee of £11,500, set by a tribunal. Pender made 14 appearances for the club, the last of which came in February 1998 after suffering a serious knee injury in a 0–2 defeat against Scunthorpe United. He was unable to recover from the injury and was released later that year.

== Personal life ==
After retiring from football, Pender settled in Telford, Shropshire, and worked as a bus driver.

In 2020, Pender was diagnosed with motor neurone disease, which his family attributes in part to head injuries sustained while playing.

== Honours ==
Burnley

- Football League Second Division play-offs: 1994
- Football League Fourth Division: 1991–92

Wigan Athletic

- Football League Third Division: 1996–97
