= Ian Measham =

English footballer

Personal information
- Date of birth: 14 December 1964 (age 61)
- Place of birth: Barnsley, England
- Height: 5 ft 11 in (1.80 m)
- Position: Right back

Youth career
- Huddersfield Town

Senior career*
Years	Team	Apps	(Gls)
1984–1986	Huddersfield Town	17	(0)
1985	→ Lincoln City (loan)	6	(0)
1985	→ Rochdale (loan)	12	(0)
1986–1988	Cambridge United	46	(0)
1988–1994	Burnley	182	(2)
1988	Barnet	1	(0)
1994–1996	Doncaster Rovers	32	(0)
- * Club domestic league appearances and goals

Ian Measham (born 14 December 1964) is a former professional footballer who played as a defender for Huddersfield Town, Lincoln City, Rochdale, Cambridge United, Burnley and Doncaster Rovers.

Measham started his football career at Huddersfield Town as a junior. He signed full terms in 1982 and spent spells on loan at Lincoln City and Rochdale before leaving the club at the end of the 1985–86 season to join Cambridge United in July 1986. He played every game of the 1986–87 season, and was named player of the season, earning him a section in the book "Cambridge United – 101 Golden Greats", but missed the whole of the next season through injury. In November 1988 he signed for Burnley, where he made more than 200 league and cup appearances in a five-season stay and won the Fourth Division title in the 1991–92 season. In September 1993, he joined Doncaster Rovers, where he spent three seasons but his time was marred by a serious neck injury. This injury only allowed him to play 32 games for Doncaster and eventually forced his retirement in 1996.

== Honours ==
Burnley

- Football League Fourth Division: 1991–92
