= Warren Joyce =

English footballer and manager

Personal information
- Full name: Warren Garton Joyce
- Date of birth: 20 January 1965 (age 61)
- Place of birth: Oldham, England
- Height: 5 ft 9 in (1.75 m)
- Position: Midfielder

Team information
- Current team: Stoke City (U21 coach)

Youth career
- 1981–1983: Bolton Wanderers

Senior career*
Years	Team	Apps	(Gls)
1983–1987	Bolton Wanderers	184	(17)
1987–1992	Preston North End	177	(34)
1992–1993	Plymouth Argyle	30	(3)
1993–1996	Burnley	70	(9)
1995	→ Hull City (loan)	9	(3)
1996–2000	Hull City	147	(15)
Total		608	(78)

Managerial career
- 1998–2000: Hull City (player-manager)
- 2006–2008: Royal Antwerp
- 2008–2010: Manchester United Reserves (co-manager)
- 2010–2016: Manchester United Reserves
- 2016–2017: Wigan Athletic
- 2017–2019: Melbourne City
- 2019–2021: Salford City (development squad)
- 2021–2022: Nottingham Forest (U18)
- 2022–2026: Nottingham Forest (U21)
- * Club domestic league appearances and goals

Warren Garton Joyce (born 20 January 1965) is an English football manager and former player.

As a player, he played in The Football League for Bolton Wanderers, Preston North End, Plymouth Argyle, Burnley and Hull City. After taking over as player-manager of Hull City in 1998, he eventually moved to Belgium, where he was appointed manager of Manchester United's feeder club Royal Antwerp in 2006.

Two years later, he returned to England as co-manager of the Manchester United reserves, along with former Manchester United forward Ole Gunnar Solskjær. When Solskjær left in 2011, Joyce took charge of the reserves. In November 2016, he was signed by Wigan Athletic as a replacement for Gary Caldwell, but left four months later. In June 2017, Joyce was announced as the new manager for Melbourne City in the A-League. On 8 May 2019, Melbourne City announced they had severed ties with Joyce.

In June 2019, he became the development coach with League Two side Salford City, spending two years with the Ammies before taking on the role of lead U18 coach with Nottingham Forest in July 2021.

== Playing career ==
=== Bolton Wanderers ===
Joyce was born in Oldham, Lancashire, the son of Walter Joyce, the former Burnley, Blackburn Rovers and Oldham Athletic player, and began his career as a trainee with Bolton Wanderers in 1981. He broke into the first team as a midfielder and in six years made a total of 221 appearances for Bolton, scoring 21 goals.

=== Preston North End ===
In October 1987, however, Preston North End manager John McGrath offered £35,000 for his services. With Joyce's father Walter now a coach at Deepdale (he had previously coached at Oldham Athletic), Joyce decided to make the move.

Over the next five years, he became a popular figure at Preston earning himself the nickname "Psycho", due to his never-say-die commitment to the cause. In all he played 208 matches for the Lilywhites scoring 44 goals, winning the club's player of the year award and being made club captain. However, when Plymouth Argyle made a £160,000 offer for him in May 1992, Preston accepted the offer and he left for Home Park.

=== Plymouth Argyle and Burnley ===
His stay in Devon was short, with Joyce playing only 40 games and scoring four goals in his year there. When Burnley offered £140,000 for him in July 1993 Plymouth decided to cash in, he was on his way back to Lancashire. In three years at Turf Moor he played 90 games and scored 12 goals.

=== Hull City ===
A loan stay though at Hull City in January 1995 paved the way for a permanent deal 18 months later, and in July 1996 Joyce signed for Hull. He went on to play a total of 170 games for Hull scoring 19 goals, becoming club captain at Boothferry Park. Later in November 1998 he was asked to stand in as caretaker manager following the departure of Mark Hateley.

City soon made the appointment permanent with Joyce taking on the dual role of player-manager. At the time of his appointment, City were rooted to the foot of the 4th Division table and looked to be heading out of the Football League – and into bankruptcy. However, under Joyce's stewardship, City staged a remarkable turnaround and achieved survival with games to spare; City fans christened this season "the Great Escape".

== Coaching and managerial career ==
Joyce started coaching at Bury while still a player at Burnley in 1993 and later joined Manchester United's U-16s, where he worked with renowned youth coach Eric Harrison and helped develop talents such as Wes Brown and David Healy.

Whilst still a senior player at Hull City, Joyce was asked to step in as caretaker in 1998 eventually taking over as player-manager, where he managed to turn around the season and kept the club away from relegation. Joyce put together a competitive squad with a limited budget and later sold 3 young players to Premier League teams for over £1m.

From 2000 to 2004, Joyce was the assistant academy director at Leeds United, where he won 3 Premier League youth titles and the Premier League National Champions Cup alongside developing important players such as James Milner, Aaron Lennon and Scott Carson.

After a year-long stint from 2004 to 2005 at Stockport County as the individual development coach, Joyce joined Tranmere Rovers, where he was responsible for developing talents including Aaron Cresswell, Steve Davies and Will Vaulks.

In 2006, Joyce was appointed manager of Belgian Pro League side Royal Antwerp, which is a feeder club for Manchester United. Joyce helped the club achieve back-to-back playoffs in the Challenger Pro League and developed local talents such as Mohamed Cisse and John Utaka who were sold for over £2m.

After two years in Belgium, Joyce was appointed as the co-manager of the Manchester United F.C. Reserves alongside Ole Gunnar Solskjaer. In 2010, after Solskjaer's departure to Molde F.K., Joyce was appointed as the sole manager, where he worked closely with Alex Ferguson. Joyce oversaw the development of talents such as Marcus Rashford, Paul Pogba, Jesse Lingard and Adnan Januzaj into the 1st team and established himself as the most successful reserves manager ever in the club's history by winning six Premier League titles and nine major international cups in eight years. The talents produced at the club by Joyce went on to become 60 internationals and 89 out of 91 were sold for over £1m.

After six years guiding Manchester United Reserves, Joyce was appointed as the manager at Wigan Athletic in 2016, where he oversaw the sale of Yanic Wildschut for £8.5m after an initial signing of £300,000. Joyce departed the club after four months following a life-threatening eye injury.

In 2017, Joyce joined Australian A-League side Melbourne City FC, where he took the club to a 3rd place finish, semi-final position in the playoffs and quarter-finals of the Australia Cup in his 1st season. During his 2nd season, the club again reached the play-offs and quarter-finals of the Australia Cup. Joyce also worked on developing important talents for the club, with 9 players making it to the Australian Olympic Football Team and 20 players going on to play in the A-League. He also oversaw the sale of Daniel Arzani for an A-League record of $8m and promoted talents such as Riley McGree, Connor Metcalfe, Denis Genreau and Nathaniel Atkinson.

Joyce joined Salford City in 2019 as the development coach and won the EFL Trophy for the first time in the club's history. He also worked on developing young talents at the club, helping Luke Burgess revive his career in league football and assisting 5 players from the club to play professional league football. Joyce also oversaw the sale of Brandon Thomas-Asante for £500,000 after acquiring him on a free transfer.

In 2021, Joyce was appointed as the U-18s development coach at Nottingham Forest, where he reached the FA Youth Cup final for the first time in the club's history in 2022. After winning 13 games and helping the club move to the top of the league, Joyce was promoted to the U-21s coach role, where he helped seven players secure first team debuts. Under his guidance at the U-21s, four youth team players made international debuts, Zach Abbott became Forest's youngest ever player at 16 and Dale Taylor became Northern Ireland national football team's youngest debutant.

In September 2026, Joyce joined Stoke City U21's as a professional development phase coach.

== Managerial statistics ==
As of 4 June 2019

Managerial record by team and tenure
Team	From	To	Record					Ref
Team	From	To	P	W	D	L	Win %	Ref
Hull City	20 November 1998	19 April 2000	86	33	25	28	38.37	
Wigan Athletic	2 November 2016	13 March 2017	24	6	5	13	25.00	
Melbourne City	19 June 2017	8 May 2019	62	29	10	23	46.77	
Total			172	68	40	64	39.53	

== Honours ==
Burnley

- Football League Second Division play-offs: 1994
