= David Eyres =

English footballer (born 1964)

Personal information
- Date of birth: 26 February 1964 (age 62)
- Place of birth: Liverpool, England
- Position: Midfielder

Senior career*
Years	Team	Apps	(Gls)
1985–1987	Morecambe		
1987–1988	Southport	29	(7)
1988–1989	Rhyl		
1989–1993	Blackpool	158	(38)
1993–1997	Burnley	175	(37)
1997–2000	Preston North End	108	(19)
2000–2006	Oldham Athletic	207	(33)
2006	Hyde United	8	(2)
2006–2007	Mossley	23	(5)
2008	Hednesford Town	3	(0)
Total		711	(141)

Managerial career
- 2003–2004: Oldham Athletic (co-caretaker)
- * Club domestic league appearances and goals

David Eyres (born 26 February 1964) is an English former professional footballer who played as a midfielder.

== Career ==
A relative latecomer to the professional game, Liverpool-born Eyres began his career at then Northern Premier League side Morecambe going on to represent both Southport and Rhyl at the same level before signing professional terms with Blackpool in 1989 who paid a fee of £10,000 to the Belle Vue-based North Wales club for his services. He subsequently made his debut for Blackpool on 22 August 1989, in a 2–2 draw at Burnley in the League Cup first round, first leg. He scored his first goal for the club three months later, on 11 November, in a 4–0 League victory over Brentford at Bloomfield Road. He spent four seasons with the Seasiders, two of which ended with appearances at Wembley in the play-off finals (achieving promotion in 1991–92). He also finished as the club's top league goalscorer in 1992–93, with sixteen goals.

In the summer of 1993, Burnley and Jimmy Mullen (Eyres' former manager at Blackpool) came in for his services with an offer of £90,000. "I know the fans won't forgive me," said Eyres nine years later, "but things had gone a bit stale at Blackpool and I decided it was the right time to go." Eyres remained at Turf Moor for four years, and then continued his tour of Lancashire by signing for Blackpool's arch-rivals Preston North End in 1997 for £80,000.

Eyres moved to Oldham in 2000 on a free transfer and signed a one-year extension to his contract the following January, which would keep him at the club until June 2002. He subsequently signed two more contracts, which tied him to the club until 2006.

During the 2003–04 season, Eyres and teammate John Sheridan took on joint caretaker-manager roles after Iain Dowie's departure from the Latics hotseat. Earlier in the season, Eyres fractured a bone in his foot, which put him out of action between October and December.

Eyres, who was voted Oldham fans' player of the season in 2001–02, scored in his 234th and final appearance for Oldham in a 1–1 draw with Scunthorpe to close out the 2005–06 season and his 18-year professional career at the age of 42. He then joined Conference North side Hyde United in August 2006, but left the club by mutual consent two months later. On 13 October 2006, Eyres signed for Northern Premier League side Mossley.

In May 2007, Eyres made a return to Burnley to play at Turf Moor in the testimonial of another ex-Claret, Graham Branch.

After leaving Mossley, Eyres joined the Everton academy in a bid to stay fit, even at 43 years old.

In January 2008 Eyres signed for Northern Premier League club Hednesford Town. He made his debut at left-back in an away game at Eastwood Town, but only made two further appearances for the Pitmen before his registration was cancelled by the club.

== Post-retirement ==
After retiring, Eyres became a match summariser for BBC Radio Lancashire.

== Honours ==
Blackpool

- Football League Fourth Division play-offs: 1992

Burnley

- Football League Second Division play-offs: 1994

Preston North End

- Football League Second Division: 1999–2000

Individual

- Southport Player of the Season: 1987–88
- PFA Team of the Year: 1996–97 Second Division
- Oldham Athletic Player of the Season: 2001–02
