= Adrian Randall =

English footballer

Personal information
- Full name: Adrian John Randall
- Date of birth: 10 November 1968 (age 58)
- Place of birth: Amesbury, England
- Height: 5 ft 11 in (1.80 m)
- Position: Midfielder

Senior career*
Years	Team	Apps	(Gls)
1986–1988	AFC Bournemouth	3	(0)
1988–1991	Aldershot	107	(12)
1991–1995	Burnley	125	(8)
1995–1996	York City	32	(2)
1996–1998	Bury	34	(3)
1998-1999	Salisbury City		(17)
1999–2000	Forest Green Rovers	11	(1)
2000	→ Newport (IOW) (loan)		

International career
1986	England U18		
- * Club domestic league appearances and goals

Adrian John Randall (born 10 November 1968) is an English former professional footballer. Randall became York City's most expensive signing when they paid £140,000 to sign the midfielder from Burnley. He was capped by the England national youth team in 1986.

== Personal life ==
His son Joel is also a professional footballer who plays as a midfielder for Bolton Wanderers.

== Honours ==
Burnley

- Football League Fourth Division: 1991–92

Bury

- Football League Second Division: 1996–97
