= Jimmy Mullen (footballer, born 1952) =

English footballer and manager

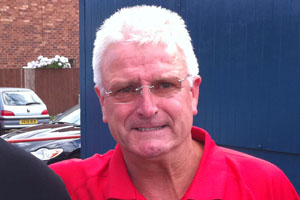

Personal information
- Full name: James Mullen
- Date of birth: 8 November 1952 (age 74)
- Place of birth: Jarrow, England
- Height: 5 ft 10 in (1.78 m)
- Position: Defender

Senior career*
Years	Team	Apps	(Gls)
1970–1980	Sheffield Wednesday	229	(10)
1980–1982	Rotherham United	49	(1)
1981–1982	→ Preston North End (loan)	1	(0)
1981–1986	Cardiff City	133	(12)
1986–1987	Newport County	19	(0)
Total		431	(23)

Managerial career
- 1984: Cardiff City
- 1986: Cardiff City
- 1986–1987: Newport County
- 1989–1990: Blackpool
- 1991–1996: Burnley
- 1996–1997: Sligo Rovers
- 2002–2003: Bridgnorth Town
- 2003–2004: Colwyn Bay
- Market Drayton Town
- Telford United
- Bromsgrove Rovers
- 2008–2009: Walsall
- 2009–2011: Market Drayton Town
- * Club domestic league appearances and goals

James Mullen (born 8 November 1952 in Jarrow, County Durham) is an English football manager who last managed at Market Drayton Town. He twice won promotion with Burnley, in 1991–92 and 1993–94.

== Playing career ==
In his playing days, Mullen spent most of his career at Sheffield Wednesday, and was their captain when they won promotion from Division Three in 1979/80. The following season, however, he went one better with Rotherham, captaining the Millers to the Division Three title.

After a short loan spell at Preston, he moved to Cardiff, where he again won promotion in 1982/83. Following the resignation of Cardiff manager Len Ashurst in March 1984, Mullen and Assistant Manager Jimmy Goodfellow were appointed joint Caretaker Managers until the end of the 1983/84 season. At the end of the season, Goodfellow was appointed as sole manager of the club, and Mullen continued as a player under Goodfellow and Alan Durban upon Goodfellow's sacking. After Durban led the club to two successive relegations, leaving them in the old Fourth Division, he was sacked and Mullen was appointed caretaker manager until the end of the season. Mullen was replaced by Frank Burrows in the summer of 1986 and he then moved on to near-neighbours Newport County, where he would end his playing days.

== Management ==
On 28 March 1989 Mullen was asked to take charge of Blackpool for the last eleven games of the season after the departure of Sam Ellis. With the help of Len Ashurst, he guided the Seasiders to five victories and avoided relegation. Soon afterwards, Mullen was given the job on a full-time basis.

In light of Ellis' success and popularity at Bloomfield Road, Mullen only lasted eleven months before being replaced by Graham Carr. One notable signing made by Mullen in his short stay at the seaside was David Eyres from non-League Rhyl.

In 1990–91, Mullen was offered and accepted the assistant-manager role at Burnley by manager Frank Casper. Casper resigned eight games into the 1991–92 season, and Mullen was put in temporary charge of team affairs.

Mullen managed to guide the Clarets to promotion to the new Division Two as the old Fourth Division champions.

His success continued in 1993–94. Burnley won promotion to the First Division via the play-offs, and Mullen's hero-like status was confirmed.

His fourth season at the Turf would prove a difficult one. Mullen survived eight consecutive defeats in the New Year of 1995, but it resulted in the Clarets returning to Division Two.

After another unsuccessful 1995–96 season, Mullen was given the sack by the Burnley board and subsequently had short spells scouting for the likes of Bolton Wanderers and Wrexham.

He then took over at Irish side Sligo Rovers during the 1996–97 campaign and stayed until the end of the season before departing for family reasons and began to work for the Welsh FA while assisting Neville Southall with the Welsh under-19s. He was appointed manager of Bridgnorth Town during the 2002–03 season, but left at the end of the season.

Mullen later managed Welsh outfit Colwyn Bay but resigned after only one season in charge. He also managed Market Drayton and Telford United.

He then joined Bromsgrove Rovers as manager, until his resignation in 2006.

In May 2007, Mullen was appointed the assistant manager of Hednesford Town.

On 28 September 2007, it was announced that Mullen had joined the backroom staff at Walsall.

In April 2008, he was appointed caretaker manager of Walsall following Richard Money's resignation. The position was made permanent the following month, but on 10 January 2009 he was sacked as manager following a run of four wins in sixteen games.

On 24 September 2009, Mullen was appointed the assistant manager of Rotherham United under Ronnie Moore.

In October 2011 he was appointed caretaker manager at Market Drayton Town. He left as manager of Market Drayton in 2013.

== Honours ==
=== As a player ===
Rotherham United

- Football League Third Division: 1980–81

=== As a manager ===
Burnley

- Football League Second Division play-offs: 1994
- Football League Fourth Division: 1991–92

Sporting positions
Preceded by Phil Dwyer	Cardiff City captain 1982-1985	Succeeded by Jake King
