= John Francis (footballer) =

English footballer

Personal information
- Full name: John Andrew Francis
- Date of birth: 21 November 1963 (age 62)
- Place of birth: Dewsbury, England
- Height: 5 ft 8 in (1.73 m)
- Position: Striker

Senior career*
Years	Team	Apps	(Gls)
1985–1986	Halifax Town	4	(0)
1986–1988	Emley		
1988–1990	Sheffield United	42	(6)
1990–1992	Burnley	101	(26)
1992–1993	Cambridge United	29	(3)
1993–1996	Burnley	76	(10)
1996–1997	Scunthorpe United	5	(0)
1998–1999	Whitby Town	5	(0)
- * Club domestic league appearances and goals

John Andrew Francis (born 21 November 1963) is an English retired professional association footballer who played as a striker. He now operates within the academy side of Ilkley Town AFC.

== Honours ==
Burnley

- Football League Second Division play-offs: 1994
- Football League Fourth Division: 1991–92
