= 1946–47 Burnley F.C. season =

English football club season

Burnley
1946–47 season
- Chairman: Tom Clegg
- Manager: Cliff Britton
- Division Two: 2nd (runners-up)
- FA Cup: Runners-up
- Top goalscorer: League: Harry Potts (15); All: Harry Potts (17)
- Highest home attendance: 49,244 v Middlesbrough (4 March 1947)
- Lowest home attendance: 15,684 v Millwall (7 June 1947)
- Average home league attendance: 25,856
Home colours

The 1946–47 season was Burnley's 10th consecutive season in the second tier of English football. Under recently appointed manager Cliff Britton they achieved promotion to the First Division, and reached the FA Cup final for only the second time (after 1914), where they were beaten by Charlton Athletic.

== Appearances and goals ==
No.	Pos	Nat	Player	Total		Division Two		FA Cup	
No.	Pos	Nat	Player	Apps	Goals	Apps	Goals	Apps	Goals
	DF	(England) ENG	Reg Attwell	28	0	22	0	6	0
	FW	(England) ENG	Jack Billingham	29	12	28	12	1	0
	DF	(England) ENG	George Bray	50	2	41	2	9	0
	DF	(England) ENG	Alan Brown	51	0	42	0	9	0
	MF	(England) ENG	Jackie Chew	43	10	35	9	8	1
	FW	(England) ENG	Gordon Haigh	6	1	6	1	0	0
	FW	(England) ENG	Ray Harrison	32	11	23	5	9	6
	MF	(England) ENG	Jack Hays	16	4	16	4	0	0
	FW	(England) ENG	Ron Hornby	1	0	1	0	0	0
	MF	(England) ENG	Peter Kippax	35	6	26	6	9	0
	FW	(England) ENG	George Knight	1	0	1	0	0	0
	FW	(England) ENG	Jackie Knight	2	1	2	1	0	0
	DF	(England) ENG	Joe Loughran	12	0	9	0	3	0
	DF	(England) ENG	Jack Marshall	1	0	1	0	0	0
	DF	(England) ENG	Harold Mather	51	0	42	0	9	0
	FW	(Wales) WAL	Billy Morris	40	13	31	9	9	4
	FW	(England) ENG	Harry Potts	49	17	40	15	9	2
	DF	(England) ENG	Harold Rudman	9	0	9	0	0	0
	DF	(England) ENG	Harold Spencer	4	1	4	1	0	0
	GK	(England) ENG	Jimmy Strong	51	0	42	0	9	0
	MF	(England) ENG	Fred Taylor	1	0	1	0	0	0
	DF	(England) ENG	Arthur Woodruff	49	0	40	0	9	0

== Matches ==
=== Football League Division Two ===
Key

- In Result column, Burnley's score shown first
- H = Home match
- A = Away match
- pen. = Penalty kick
- o.g. = Own goal

Results

Date	Opponents	Result	Goalscorers	Attendance
31 August 1946	Coventry City (H)	1–1	Kippax 10'	18,427
7 September 1946	Birmingham City (A)	2–0	Spencer 55' (pen.), Billingham 80'	42,309
9 September 1946	Newport County (H)	3–2	Chew 14', Billingham 50', Haigh 75'	18,008
14 September 1946	West Bromwich Albion (H)	0–2		22,252
16 September 1946	Barnsley (A)	0–1		26,247
21 September 1946	Newcastle United (A)	2–1	Potts (2) 21', 30'	61,255
28 September 1946	Swansea Town (H)	1–0	Harrison 37'	19,968
30 September 1946	Barnsley (H)	2–2	Harrison 66', Bray 88'	24,959
5 October 1946	Tottenham Hotspur (A)	1–1	Kippax 69' (pen.)	44,351
12 October 1946	West Ham United (H)	2–1	Billingham 1', Kippax 89' (pen.)	22,233
19 October 1946	Sheffield Wednesday (A)	2–1	Chew 9', Billingham 30'	22,083
26 October 1946	Fulham (H)	2–0	Bray 7' (pen.), Billingham 35'	26,905
2 November 1946	Bury (A)	2–2	Billingham 9', Potts 79'	26,167
9 November 1946	Luton Town (H)	1–1	Billingham 26'	26,007
16 November 1946	Plymouth Argyle (A)	2–2	Billingham 63', Morris 78'	30,032
23 November 1946	Leicester City (H)	0–0		19,062
30 November 1946	Chesterfield (A)	0–0		16,570
7 December 1946	Millwall (H)	3–0	Billingham 35', Kippax 47', Potts 70'	17,968
14 December 1946	Bradford (Park Avenue) (A)	1–0	Morris 16'	10,731
21 December 1946	Manchester City (H)	0–0		31,210
25 December 1946	Nottingham Forest (H)	3–0	Chew (2) 20', 52', Kippax 85'	21,036
26 December 1946	Nottingham Forest (A)	0–1		31,484
28 December 1946	Coventry City (A)	3–0	Morris 18', 49', 71'	26,944
4 January 1947	Birmingham City (H)	1–0	Potts 80'	36,281
18 January 1947	West Bromwich Albion (A)	1–1	Chew 40'	43,427
28 January 1947	Newcastle United (H)	3–0	Chew 40', Potts (2) 30', 53'	26,877
1 February 1947	Swansea Town (A)	2–0	Chew 77', Harrison 85'	18,247
18 February 1947	Tottenham Hotspur (H)	0–0		28,462
22 February 1947	Sheffield Wednesday (H)	2–0	Harrison 30', Morris 55'	26,651
15 March 1947	Luton Town (A)	3–1	Potts (2) 34', 76', Harrison 88'	18,462
22 March 1947	Plymouth Argyle (H)	2–1	Chew 46', Potts 90'	28,287
4 April 1947	Southampton (H)	1–0	Kippax 35'	31,713
5 April 1947	Chesterfield (H)	1–1	Potts 57'	23,719
7 April 1947	Southampton (A)	1–0	J Knight 75'	20,330
19 April 1947	Bradford (Park Avenue) (H)	1–2	Potts 7'	32,905
3 May 1947	Newport County (A)	3–0	Hays 3', Morris 35', Potts 80'	14,751
10 May 1947	Manchester City (A)	0–1		69,463
17 May 1947	Fulham (A)	0–1		25,432
24 May 1947	Leicester City (A)	4–1	Billingham 4', 5', Hays 13', 77'	21,626
26 May 1947	Bury (H)	1–1	Billingham 41'	40,145
31 May 1947	West Ham United (A)	5–0	Chew 17', Morris 38', Potts 43', 55', Hays 60'	20,198
7 June 1947	Millwall (H)	1–1	Morris 47'	15,684

=== Final league position ===
Pos	Team	Pld	W	D	L	GF	GA	GAv	Pts	Qualification or relegation
1	Manchester City (C, P)	42	26	10	6	78	35	2.229	62	Promotion to the First Division
2	Burnley (P)	42	22	14	6	65	29	2.241	58	Promotion to the First Division
3	Birmingham City	42	25	5	12	74	33	2.242	55	
4	Chesterfield	42	18	14	10	58	44	1.318	50	
5	Newcastle United	42	19	10	13	95	62	1.532	48	

Rules for classification: 1) Points; 2) Goal average; 3) Goals scored
(C) Champions; (P) Promoted

=== FA Cup ===
Date	Round	Opponents	Result	Goalscorers	Attendance
11 January 1947	Round 3	Aston Villa (H)	5–1	Morris 8', 23', Potts 70', Harrison 78', 79'	38,532
25 January 1947	Round 4	Coventry City (H)	2–0	Chew 31', Potts 85'	39,796
8 February 1947	Round 5	Luton Town (A)	0–0		22,640
11 February 1947	Round 5 replay	Luton Town (H)	3–0	Harrison 51', 68', 83'	28,330
1 March 1947	Round 6	Middlesbrough (A)	1–1	Morris 80'	53,025
4 March 1947	Round 6 replay	Middlesbrough (H)	1–0	Morris 94'	49,244
29 March 1947	Semi-Final	Liverpool (N)	0–0		53,000
12 April 1947	Semi-Final replay	Liverpool (N)	1–0	Harrison 79'	72,000
26 April 1947	Final	Charlton Athletic (N)	0–1		98,215
