= 1947–48 Burnley F.C. season =

English football club season

Burnley
1947–48 season
- Chairman: Tom Clegg
- Manager: Cliff Britton
- Division One: 3rd
- FA Cup: 3rd Round
- Top goalscorer: League: Harry Potts (14); All: Harry Potts (14)
- Highest home attendance: 52,869 v Blackpool (11 October 1947)
- Lowest home attendance: 19,522 v Grimsby Town (20 March 1948)
- Average home league attendance: 33,621
Home colours

The 1947–48 season was Burnley's first season in the top tier of English football for 18 years. Under Cliff Britton they finished in 3rd place.

== Appearances and goals ==
No.	Pos	Nat	Player	Total		Division One		FA Cup	
No.	Pos	Nat	Player	Apps	Goals	Apps	Goals	Apps	Goals
	DF	(England) ENG	Reg Attwell	39	1	38	1	1	0
	FW	(England) ENG	Jack Billingham	36	13	35	13	1	0
	DF	(England) ENG	George Bray	43	3	42	3	1	0
	DF	(England) ENG	Alan Brown	37	0	36	0	1	0
	DF	(England) ENG	Jack Butterfield	3	0	3	0	0	0
	MF	(England) ENG	Jackie Chew	35	4	34	4	1	0
	FW	(England) ENG	Gordon Haigh	4	1	4	1	0	0
	FW	(England) ENG	Ray Harrison	11	7	10	7	1	0
	MF	(England) ENG	Jack Hays	38	3	37	3	1	0
	FW	(England) ENG	Ron Hornby	4	1	4	1	0	0
	DF	(England) ENG	Bob Johnson	6	0	6	0	0	0
	MF	(England) ENG	Peter Kippax	6	0	6	0	0	0
	FW	(England) ENG	Jackie Knight	17	3	16	3	1	0
	DF	(England) ENG	Joe Loughran	15	0	15	0	0	0
	DF	(England) ENG	Harold Mather	39	0	38	0	1	0
	FW	(Wales) WAL	Billy Morris	23	4	23	4	0	0
	FW	(England) ENG	Harry Potts	39	14	38	14	1	0
	GK	(England) ENG	Jimmy Strong	43	0	42	0	1	0
	DF	(England) ENG	Arthur Woodruff	36	0	35	0	1	0

== Matches ==
=== Football League Division One ===
Key

- In Result column, Burnley's score shown first
- H = Home match
- A = Away match
- pen. = Penalty kick
- o.g. = Own goal

Results

Date	Opponents	Result	Goalscorers	Attendance
23 August 1947	Portsmouth (A)	1–0	Potts 2'	33,967
26 August 1947	Derby County (H)	0–2		43,067
30 August 1947	Bolton Wanderers (H)	2–0	Potts 18', Morris 38'	35,835
3 September 1947	Derby County (A)	1–1	George Bray 86'	32,565
6 September 1947	Liverpool (A)	1–1	Hays 67'	56,074
8 September 1947	Manchester United (H)	0–0		38,517
13 September 1947	Middlesbrough (H)	3–0	Hays 2', Potts 37', Chew 40'	34,944
20 September 1947	Charlton Athletic (A)	1–1	Billingham 80'	37,588
27 September 1947	Arsenal (H)	0–1		47,958
4 October 1947	Sheffield United (A)	1–1	Billingham 16'	40,930
11 October 1947	Blackpool (H)	1–0	Potts 79'	52,869
18 October 1947	Blackburn Rovers (A)	2–1	(o.g.) 5', Morris 55'	41,635
25 October 1947	Manchester City (H)	1–1	Hays 64'	41,454
1 November 1947	Grimsby Town (A)	2–1	Billingham 36', 65'	17,697
8 November 1947	Wolverhampton Wanderers (H)	1–1	Potts 43'	38,356
15 November 1947	Everton (A)	3–0	Knight 40', Billingham 57', Potts 70'	49,442
22 November 1947	Sunderland (H)	4–0	Billingham 24', Potts 67', 69' (pen.), Knight 71'	21,939
29 November 1947	Aston Villa (A)	2–2	Potts 7', 34'	56,595
6 December 1947	Chelsea (H)	1–0	Potts 14'	30,865
13 December 1947	Huddersfield Town (A)	1–0	Potts 84' (pen.)	36,375
20 December 1947	Portsmouth (H)	3–2	Billingham 2', 10', 61'	30,131
25 December 1947	Preston North End (H)	1–0	Potts 90'	44,645
26 December 1947	Preston North End (A)	2–3	Billingham 35', Bray 80'	39,400
1 January 1948	Manchester United (A)	0–5		61,100
3 January 1948	Bolton Wanderers (A)	1–1	Harrison 30'	43,442
17 January 1948	Liverpool (H)	3–0	Billingham 52', 88', Knight 69'	31,470
31 January 1948	Middlesbrough (A)	2–1	Chew 38', Potts 61'	36,208
14 February 1948	Arsenal (A)	0–3		62,125
21 February 1948	Sheffield United (H)	0–0		20,667
6 March 1948	Blackburn Rovers (H)	0–0		44,240
13 March 1948	Manchester City (A)	1–4	(o.g.) 13'	32,213
20 March 1948	Grimsby Town (H)	4–1	Haigh 9', Harrison 39', 69', Hornby 87'	19,522
26 March 1948	Stoke City (H)	4–0	Harrison 15', 75', Chew 30', 60'	28,989
27 March 1948	Wolverhampton Wanderers (A)	1–1	Morris 76'	38,360
29 March 1948	Stoke City (A)	0–3		33,014
3 April 1948	Everton (H)	0–1		23,933
7 April 1948	Blackpool (A)	1–0	Morris 30'	16,732
10 April 1948	Sunderland (A)	0–2		47,003
17 April 1948	Aston Villa (H)	1–0	Harrison 44'	25,671
20 April 1948	Charlton Athletic (H)	0–2		26,627
24 April 1948	Chelsea (A)	2–0	Billingham 65', Attwell 79'	33,390
1 May 1948	Huddersfield Town (H)	2–1	Bray 61', Harrison 64'	25,443

=== Final league position ===
Pos	Team	Pld	W	D	L	GF	GA	GAv	Pts
1	Arsenal (C)	42	23	13	6	81	32	2.531	59
2	Manchester United	42	19	14	9	81	48	1.688	52
3	Burnley	42	20	12	10	56	43	1.302	52
4	Derby County	42	19	12	11	77	57	1.351	50
5	Wolverhampton Wanderers	42	19	9	14	83	70	1.186	47

Source: World Football
Rules for classification: 1) Points; 2) Goal average; 3) Goals scored
(C) Champions

=== FA Cup ===
Date	Round	Opponents	Result	Goalscorers	Attendance
10 January 1948	Round 3	Swindon Town (H)	0–2		34,229
