= Burnley F.C. Academy =

Coordinates: 53°48′09.7″N 2°17′49.7″W

- Nickname: The Clarets
- Ground: Barnfield Training Ground; County Ground (under-21s)
- Manager: Andy Farrell (under-21s); Tony Philliskirk (under-18s)
- League: Professional Development League (under-21s and under-18s); National League Cup (under-21s)

Burnley F.C. Academy are the youth teams of Burnley Football Club. The under-21s currently play in the first level of reserve football in England, the U21 Professional Development League. The team mainly consists of players under the age of 21 at the club, but does occasionally include first team players. Burnley's under-18s also play in the first level of academy football in England, the U18 Professional Development League.

== U21 squad ==
As of 22 July 2026

Note: Flags indicate national team as defined under FIFA eligibility rules; some limited exceptions apply. Players may hold more than one non-FIFA nationality.

No.	Pos.	Nation	Player
—	GK	IRL	Oisin Cooney
—	GK	ENG	Lewis Forshaw
—	GK	ENG	Jack Robinson
—	DF	ENG	Emmanuel Airoboma
—	DF	SCO	Murray Campbell
—	MF	SCO	Oli Pimlott
—	DF	ENG	Hamzat Balogun
—	DF	NED	Jesse Williams
—	DF	SCO	Cameron Scott
—	DF	ENG	Michael Stanley
—	DF	ENG	Corey King

No.	Pos.	Nation	Player
—	MF	ENG	Joe Bauress
—	MF	ENG	George Brierley
—	MF	SCO	Ellis Clark
—	MF	ANG	Delfim Luwawu
—	MF	NIR	Troy Savage
—	GK	ENG	Connor Edwards
—	FW	CHN	Zhang Jiaming
—	MF	ENG	Zach Johnson
—	FW	ENG	Brandon Pouani
—	FW	ENG	Braidin Derbyshire

Out on loan

Note: Flags indicate national team as defined under FIFA eligibility rules; some limited exceptions apply. Players may hold more than one non-FIFA nationality.

No.	Pos.	Nation	Player
51	MF	IRL	Kian McMahon-Brown (at Shrewsbury Town until 30 June 2027)

== U18 Squad ==
As of 11 July 2026

Note: Flags indicate national team as defined under FIFA eligibility rules; some limited exceptions apply. Players may hold more than one non-FIFA nationality.

No.	Pos.	Nation	Player
—	GK	ENG	Harry Grimshaw
—	GK	ENG	Callum Feeney
—	GK	FRA	Johanon Lo-Tutala
—	DF	ENG	Freddie Best
—	DF	ENG	Croyde da Costa
—	DF	ENG	Diandro Fletchman
—	DF	ENG	Luca Fong
—	DF	IRL	Glen Ilunga
—	DF	ENG	Tadi Murwira
—	DF	ENG	Darren Oshodi
—	MF	ENG	Terry Leonard

No.	Pos.	Nation	Player
—	MF	ENG	James Lewis
—	MF	ENG	Dylan Morison
—	MF	ENG	Sam Morley
—	MF	ENG	Elijah Turahirwa
—	FW	BER	Blayz Borgesson
—	FW	ENG	Aiden Huggett
—	FW	WAL	Archie Lorimer
—	FW	ENG	Vishon Masara
—	FW	ENG	Jas Mmakogu
—	FW	GIB	Luca Scanlon
—	FW	ENG	Warren Taylor

== Honours ==
The list below includes honours won by either Burnley's "A", "B", reserves, under-23s, under-21s, or under-18s teams.

=== League ===
The Central League (first tier)

- Winners: 1948–49, 1961–62, 1962–63
- Runners–up: 1950–51, 1953–54

Professional U18 Development League 2 North (second tier)

- Winners: 2024–25

The Central League Division Two (third tier)

- Winners: 1997–98

Lancashire League Division One

- Winners: 1952–53, 1956–57, 1960–61, 1961–62, 1993–94

Lancashire League Division Two

- Winners: 1955–56, 1977–78, 1978–79, 1980–81

Lancashire Combination Division Two

- Winners: 1954–55
- Runners–up: 1907–08

West Lancashire Football League Division One

- Winners: 1927–28, 1938–39, 1949–50

North East Lancashire League (Note: Burnley won both the 1892–93 and 1893–94 seasons with unbeaten records, scoring 112 goals in 22 matches in the former and 119 in 18 games in the latter.)

- Winners: 1892–93, 1893–94
- Runners–up: 1890–91, 1891–92

=== Cup ===
FA Youth Cup

- Winners: 1967–68

Premier League Cup

- Winners: 2025–26

Central League Cup

- Winners: 2023–24

Central League Cup North

- Winners: 2015–16

Lancashire Senior Cup (Note: The club generally fielded its first team in the competition until the mid-1990s.)

- Winners: (14) 1889–90, 1914–15, 1949–50, 1951–52, 1959–60, 1960–61, 1961–62, 1964–65, 1965–66, 1969–70, 1971–72, 1992–93, 2022–23, 2025–26

European Youth Cup (under-21)

- Winners: 1966 (Note: Held in Düsseldorf, West Germany, Burnley defeated Fortuna Düsseldorf (3–1), 1. FC Köln (3–0), and Inter Milan (1–0) to reach the final, where they beat Barcelona 2–1.)
- Runners-up: 1965 (Note: Held in Marl, West Germany, Burnley beat Ajax, Auswahl Marl, and Juventus to reach the final, in which they lost to Red Star Belgrade.)

Washington International Youth Tournament (Note: Held at Sunderland's training ground in Washington (County Durham), with the final at Roker Park, it was the first international under-19 club tournament held in England. In the group stage, Burnley defeated Sheffield United and Kickers Offenbach (West Germany), and drew with Standard Liège (Belgium). The team qualified for the final, where they defeated Sunderland 1–0, with Leighton James scoring the only goal.)

- Winners: 1972

== Graduates ==
Below is a list of Burnley youth players that have gone on to play in the first team since 1936.

Players that have been capped at full international level are in bold.

1930s
- **(England) Tommy Lawton**
- (England) Ken Ashbridge
- (England) Len Martindale
- (England) Freddy Taylor
- (England) George Bray
- (England) George Knight

1940s

- **(England) Peter Kippax**
- (England) Harry Mather
- (England) Harry Potts
- (England) Harold Spencer
- (England) Harold Rudman
- (England) Jack Knight
- (England) Tommy Cummings
- (England) Tommy Henderson

1950s

- (England) Roy Stephenson
- (England) Jimmy Adamson
- (England) Tony Hapgood
- (England) Albert Cheesebrough
- **(England) Brian Pilkington**
- (Scotland) Doug Winton
- (Scotland) David Cargill
- (Scotland) Bobby Seith
- **(England) Colin McDonald**
- (England) Jimmy Scott
- (Scotland) Dave Smith
- **(England) Brian Miller**
- **(England) John Angus**
- (England) Jimmy Robson
- **(Scotland) Adam Blacklaw**
- (England) Des Lancaster
- (England) Ian Lawson
- (England) Alan Shackleton
- **(England) John Connelly**
- **(England) Ray Pointer**
- (England) Billy White
- (England) John Talbut
- **(England) Gordon Harris**

1960s

- (England) Jim Furnell
- (England) Walter Joyce
- (Scotland) Andy Lochhead
- (England) Ron Fenton
- (England) Dave Walker
- (England) Ian Towers
- (England) Peter Simpson
- (England) Arthur Bellamy
- (England) Mick Buxton
- **(Scotland) Willie Morgan**
- (England) Brian O'Neil
- **(Northern Ireland) Willie Irvine**
- (England) Johnny Price
- (England) Fred Smith
- **(Northern Ireland) Sammy Todd**
- **(England) Ralph Coates**
- (England) Les Latcham
- (England) Dave Merrington
- (Scotland) Len Kinsella
- (England) John Murray
- (England) Colin Blant
- (England) Ray Ternent
- (England) Stan Ternent
- **(England) Dave Thomas**
- (England) Peter Jones
- (Scotland) Willie Brown
- (England) Steve Kindon
- (England) Wilf Wrigley
- (England) Eric Probert
- (England) Mick Docherty

1970s

- (England) Alan West
- (England) Eddie Cliff
- **(Wales) Leighton James**
- (England) Ronnie Welch
- (England) Harry Wilson
- (Wales) Jeff Parton
- (England) Billy Ingham
- (England) Billy Rodaway
- (England) Paul Bradshaw
- (England) Ray Hankin
- (England) Terry Pashley
- **(Wales) Brian Flynn**
- (England) Micky Finn
- (England) Ian Brennan
- (England) Bobby Flavell
- (England) Colin Morris
- (England) Derrick Parker
- (England) Derek Scott
- (England) David Loggie
- (Scotland) Joe Jakub
- (England) Peter Robinson
- (Scotland) Marshall Burke
- (England) Bob Higgins
- (England) Richard Overson
- (England) Tony Arins
- (England) Kevin Young
- (Scotland) Stuart Robertson
- (England) Jeff Tate
- (England) Phil Cavener
- (England) Vince Overson
- (Northern Ireland) Paul Dixon

1980s

- (England) Brian Laws
- (England) Colin Anderson
- (England) Andy Wharton
- (England) Mick Wardrobe
- **(England) Mike Phelan**
- **(England) Trevor Steven**
- (England) Mark Allen
- (England) Dave Miller
- (England) Phil Ray
- **(New Zealand) Billy Wright**
- **(England) Lee Dixon**
- (England) Steve Kennedy
- (England) Darren Heesom
- (England) Ashley Hoskin
- (England) Andy Kilner
- (England) Peter Leebrook
- (England) Jason Harris
- (England) Michael Southern
- (England) Tony Woodworth
- (England) Phil Devaney
- (England) Jason Hardy
- (England) Mark Monington
- (England) Stuart Hooper
- (England) Paul McKay

1990s

- (England) Neil Howarth
- (England) Graham Lancashire
- (England) John Mullin
- (England) Paul Smith
- (England) Wayne Dowell
- (England) Chris Brass
- (England) John Borland
- (England) Paul Weller
- (England) Colin Carr-Lawton
- (England) Wayne Dowell
- (England) Phil Eastwood
- (England) Ian Duerden
- (England) Carl Smith
- (England) Matthew Heywood
- (England) Chris Scott
- (England) Brad Maylett
- (England) Michael Devenney
- (England) John Williamson

2000s

- (England) Anthony Shandran
- (England) Matthew O'Neill
- (England) Richard Chaplow
- (England) Mark Rasmussen
- (England) Andy Waine
- (Australia) Ryan Townsend
- (England) Paul Scott
- (England) Joel Pilkington
- **(Northern Ireland) Kyle Lafferty**
- (Republic of Ireland) Chris McCann
- **(England) Jay Rodriguez**
- (Scotland) Alex MacDonald

2010s

- (England) Michael King
- (England) Wes Fletcher
- **(New Zealand) Cameron Howieson**
- (England) Steven Hewitt
- **(Northern Ireland) Shay McCartan**
- (England) Joe Jackson
- **(Australia) Aiden O'Neill**
- (England) Dwight McNeil

2020s

- (England) Max Thompson
- (England) Bobby Thomas
- (England) Anthony Glennon
- (England) Lewis Richardson
- (England) Owen Dodgson
- (Republic of Ireland) Dara Costelloe
- (England) Joe Bauress
- (England) Will Hugill
