= List of Burnley F.C. players =

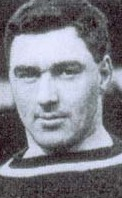
Bert Freeman scored 115 goals in 189 appearances for Burnley between 1911 and 1921.

Burnley Football Club is an English professional association football club based in the town of Burnley, Lancashire. Founded on 18 May 1882, the club was one of the first to become professional (in 1883), putting pressure on the Football Association (FA) to permit payments to players. In 1885, the FA legalised professionalism, so the team entered the FA Cup for the first time in 1885–86, and were one of the twelve founding members of the Football League in 1888–89. Burnley have played in all four professional divisions of English football from 1888 to the present day. The team have been champions of England twice, in 1920–21 and 1959–60, have won the FA Cup once, in 1913–14, and have won the FA Charity Shield twice, in 1960 and 1973. Burnley are one of only five teams to have won all four professional divisions of English football, along with Wolverhampton Wanderers, Preston North End, Sheffield United and Portsmouth. They were the second to achieve this by winning the Fourth Division in the 1991–92 season.

Jerry Dawson holds the record for the greatest number of appearances for Burnley. Between 1907 and 1929, the goalkeeper played 569 times for the club. George Beel scored 188 goals during his Burnley career and is the club's record goalscorer. Seven players who have made at least 100 appearances for Burnley went on to manage the team: Jimmy Adamson, Frank Casper (also as caretaker manager), Steve Davis (as caretaker manager), Adrian Heath (as player-manager), Brian Laws, Brian Miller, and Harry Potts. Potts became the club's longest serving manager with 745 competitive matches. During his playing career, Adamson won the Footballer of the Year award in 1962—the only time a Burnley player has won this award. Northern Irishman Willie Irvine is the only player in the club's history to be crowned top goal scorer of the first tier (in 1965–66). When Bob Kelly moved from Burnley to Sunderland for £6,500 in 1925 (equivalent to £340,000 in 2025 (Note: UK Consumer Price Index inflation figures from 1209–2024 based on data from "Inflation calculator". Bank of England. London. 18 February 2026.)), he broke the world transfer record.

All players who have played 100 or more first-team matches for the club, either as a member of the starting eleven or as a substitute, are listed below. Each player's details include the duration of his career with Burnley, his typical playing position while with the club, and the number of matches played and goals scored in all senior competitive matches.

== Key ==
- Statistics are correct as of the match played on 24 May 2026.
- Players are initially arranged by alphabetical order of surname.
- Playing positions are listed according to the tactical formations that were employed at the time. Thus, the change in the names of defensive and midfield positions reflects the tactical evolution that occurred from around the 1960s onwards.
- "Burnley career" refers to the calendar years marking the beginning and end of a player’s contract with the club.
- Appearances as a substitute are included. This feature of the game was introduced in the Football League at the start of the 1965–66 season.
- Total appearances and goals comprise those in the Football League, including test matches and play-offs, Premier League, FA Cup, Football League Cup, Charity Shield, European Cup, Inter-Cities Fairs Cup, UEFA Europa League, Texaco Cup, Watney Cup, Anglo-Scottish Cup, Football League Group Cup, and Associate Members' Cup / Football League Trophy. Wartime fixtures and expunged matches are not included.

Positions key (Note: For more information, see formation)
Pre-1960s		1960s–	
GK	Goalkeeper		
FB	Full back	DF	Defender
HB	Half back	MF	Midfielder
FW	Forward		
U	Utility player		

Symbol	Meaning
‡	Player still at the club
*	Player represented his country at senior international level during his time at the club

== List of players ==
List of Burnley F.C. players with at least 100 appearances (Note: Statistics are sourced from Simpson (2007), The Clarets Chronicles up to and including the 2006–07 season. Statistics from 2007 onwards are sourced from Soccerbase.)
Name	Nationality	Position	Burnley career	Appearances	Goals	Notes	Refs.
Ted Adams	England	GK	1936–1943	118	0		
Jimmy Adamson	England	HB/MF	1947–1964	486	18	(Note: Jimmy Adamson was Burnley's captain during their 1959–60 title-winning campaign. Adamson is the only player in Burnley's history to have been named FWA Footballer of the Year, achieving the feat in the 1961–62 season. He was also manager of Burnley from 1970 to 1976.)	
Jock Aird	Scotland*	FB	1948–1955	143	0	(Note: The Scot Jock Aird was the first Burnley player to appear in the FIFA World Cup finals, in 1954.)	
Ade Akinbiyi	Nigeria	FW	2005–2006, 2007–2009	122	31		
Graham Alexander	Scotland*	DF/MF	2007–2011	177	24		
Joe Anderson	Scotland	FW	1920–1923	126	72		
John Angus	England*	FB/DF	1955–1972	521	4		
Scott Arfield	Canada*	MF	2013–2018	193	22		
Gordon Armstrong	England	MF	1998–2003	113	4		
Reg Attwell	England	HB	1946–1954	269	11		
Tom Bamford	England	FB	1909–1920	157	0		
Ashley Barnes‡	England	FW	2014–2023, 2025–present	320	57		
Fred Barron	England	HB	1898–1911	423	14		
Alf Basnett	England	HB	1919–1926	157	5		
George Beel	England	FW	1923–1932	337	188	(Note: George Beel holds the club goalscoring record with 188 goals.)	
Arthur Bell	England	FW	1902–1909	104	29		
Arthur Bellamy	England	MF/FW	1959–1972	250	29		
Marlon Beresford	England	GK	1992–1998, 2002–2003	350	0		
Adam Blacklaw	Scotland*	GK	1954–1967	383	0		
Robbie Blake	England	MF	2002–2005, 2007–2010	282	72		
Billy Bowes	Scotland	FW	1891–1901	295	84		
George Boyd	Scotland	MF/FW	2014–2017	123	12		
Tommy Boyle	England*	FB/HB	1911–1923	236	43	(Note: Tommy Boyle captained Burnley during both their 1914 FA Cup triumph and their 1920–21 First Division title-winning campaign.)	
Graham Branch	England	U	1998–2007	299	18		
Chris Brass	England	DF	1993–2001	160	1		
George Bray	England	HB	1937–1952	259	9		
Ian Brennan	England	DF	1970–1980	212	14		
Lee Briscoe	England	DF/MF	2000–2003	119	7		
Ian Britton	Scotland	MF	1986–1989	130	10		
Bob Brocklebank	England	FW	1936–1945	128	38		
James Brown	Scotland	HB	1927–1935	241	5		
Josh Brownhill	England	MF	2020–2025	211	32		
Jack Bruton	England*	HB/FW	1925–1929	176	44		
Steven Caldwell	Scotland*	DF	2007–2010	119	5		
Mo Camara	Guinea	DF/MF	2003–2005	104	1		
Clarke Carlisle	England	DF	2007–2012	152	9		
Frank Casper	England	FW	1967–1976	275	89	(Note: Frank Casper was caretaker manager of Burnley in 1983, and the club's permanent manager from 1989 to 1991.)	
Albert Cheesebrough	England	FW	1952–1959	158	40		
Jackie Chew	England	HB/FW	1946–1954	248	41		
Ralph Coates	England*	MF/FW	1963–1971	261	32		
Doug Collins	England	MF	1968–1976	217	19		
Paul Comstive	England	MF	1987–1989	103	23		
John Connelly	England*	FW	1956–1964	265	104		
Mike Conroy	Scotland	FW	1991–1993	101	41		
Paul Cook	England	MF	1999–2003	169	15		
Andy Cooke	England	FW	1995–2000	202	61		
Jack Cork	England*	DF/MF	2010–2011, 2017–2024	267	11		
Ian Cox	Trinidad and Tobago*	DF	2000–2003	131	5		
Jonathan Cretney	England	HB	1905–1911	177	10		
Benny Cross	England	FW	1920–1928	255	61		
Josh Cullen‡	Republic of Ireland*	MF	2022–present	140	7		
Tommy Cummings	England	FB/DF	1947–1963	479	3		
Steve Davis	England	DF	1987–1991	181	12		
Steve Davis	England	DF	1989–1990, 1991–1995, 1998–2003	388	47	(Note: Steve Davis was briefly caretaker manager of Burnley in 2007.)	
Jerry Dawson	England*	GK	1907–1929	569	0	(Note: Jerry Dawson holds the club record for most appearances with 569.)	
Ray Deakin	England	DF	1985–1991	247	6		
John Deary	England	MF	1989–1995	275	27		
Joe Devine	Scotland	HB/FW	1925–1930	121	29		
Arthur Dixon	England	FB	1900–1907	183	8		
Martin Dobson	England*	MF	1967–1974, 1979–1984	497	76		
Mick Docherty	England	DF	1967–1976	174	1		
Michael Duff	Northern Ireland*	DF	2004–2016	383	8		
Chris Eagles	England	MF/FW	2008–2011	143	25		
David Edgar	Canada*	DF	2009–2014	114	4		
Alex Elder	Northern Ireland*	DF	1959–1967	330	17		
Roger Eli	England	FW	1989–1994	132	31		
Wade Elliott	England	MF	2005–2011	282	23		
Maxime Estève	France	DF	2024–2026	100	1		
David Eyres	England	MF	1993–1997	215	55		
Andy Farrell	England	U	1987–1994	331	23		
Paul Fletcher	England	FW	1971–1980	352	86		
Brian Flynn	Wales*	MF	1972–1977, 1982–1984	250	27		
Alex Forrest	Scotland	HB	1927–1933	116	4		
John Francis	England	FW	1990–1992, 1993–1996	226	46		
Bert Freeman	England*	FW	1911–1921	189	115	(Note: Bert Freeman scored the winning goal in the 1914 FA Cup final. Six years later, Freeman became the first Burnley player to reach 100 league goals—and remains the fastest to achieve this milestone, doing so in just 152 matches.)	
Steve Gardner	England	DF	1987–1990	115	0		
Lee Grant	England	GK	2005–2006, 2010–2013	127	0		
Tony Grant	England	MF	2001–2005	166	3		
Billy Gray	England	FW	1953–1957	130	32		
Billy Green	England	GK	1903–1908	153	0		
Neil Grewcock	England	MF/FW	1984–1991	242	32		
Joey Guðjónsson	Iceland*	MF	2007–2010	109	7		
Jóhann Berg Guðmundsson	Iceland*	MF/FW	2016–2024	228	15		
George Halley	Scotland	FB/HB	1913–1922	153	5		
Billy Hamilton	Northern Ireland*	FW	1979–1984	251	77		
Peter Hampton	England	DF	1984–1987	134	2		
Ted Hancock	England	HB/FW	1933–1936	123	31		
Ray Hankin	England	FW	1973–1976	139	47		
Roger Hansbury	England	GK	1983–1985	103	0		
Jon Harley	England	DF	2005–2008	126	3		
Gordon Harris	England*	MF	1958–1968	313	81		
Gerry Harrison	England	MF	1994–1998, 2000	146	3		
Jack Hays	England	HB/FW	1939–1951	154	13		
Adrian Heath	England	MF/FW	1992–1995, 1996–1997	148	35	(Note: Adrian Heath was player-manager of Burnley from 1996 to 1997. He was the first person in the club's history to hold that role.)	
Tom Heaton	England*	GK	2013–2019	200	0		
Jeff Hendrick	Republic of Ireland*	MF	2016–2020	139	10		
Jack Hill	England*	FB	1923–1928	198	13		
Jimmy Hill	Scotland	HB/FW	1889–1897	162	42		
Jack Hillman	England*	GK	1890–1895, 1898–1902	188	0		
Kevin Hird	England	DF/MF	1984–1986	100	30		
Teddy Hodgson	England	FW	1911–1919	137	62	(Note: Teddy Hodgson died while still registered as a Burnley player, passing away from a kidney ailment during his military service.)	
Bill Holden	England	FW	1950–1955	199	78		
David Holt	England	DF	1980–1983	110	4		
Ron Hornby	England	HB/FW	1934–1949	135	19		
Ashley Hoskin	England	MF/FW	1985–1989	105	13		
Jamie Hoyland	England	MF	1994–1998	105	4		
Tommy Hutchison	Scotland	MF	1983–1985	114	5		
Micah Hyde	Jamaica*	MF	2004–2007	114	2		
Billy Ingham	England	MF	1969–1980	266	31		
Danny Ings	England	FW	2011–2015	130	43		
Willie Irvine	Northern Ireland*	FW	1960–1968	148	97	(Note: Willie Irvine is the only player in Burnley's history to have been the top scorer in the top flight, achieving the feat in the 1965–66 season.)	
Joe Jakub	Scotland	DF/MF	1973–1980, 1989–1993	255	9		
Leighton James	Wales*	MF/FW	1970–1975, 1978–1980, 1986–1989	399	81		
Brian Jensen	Denmark	GK	2003–2013	310	0		
David Jones	England	MF	2013–2016	131	3		
Michael Keane	England*	DF	2014–2017	108	7		
Bob Kelly	England*	FW	1913–1925	299	97	(Note: Bob Kelly's transfer from Burnley to Sunderland in 1925 broke the world transfer record.)	
Steve Kindon	England	MF/FW	1967–1972, 1977–1979	225	58		
Sandy Lang	Scotland	FB	1885–1895	134	3	(Note: Sandy Lang and Walter Place both appeared in matches for Burnley before the commencement of the Football League in 1888.) (Note: Sandy Lang was a captain during Burnley's first season in the Football League. He was also the first player in the club's history to make 100 league appearances, reaching the milestone in 1892.)	
Les Latcham	England	DF/MF	1960–1971	184	12		
Brian Laws	England	DF	1979–1983	160	15	(Note: Brian Laws was manager of Burnley in 2010.)	
Dick Lindley	England	FW	1908–1920	152	46		
Glen Little	England	MF/FW	1996–2004	283	36		
Archie Livingstone	Scotland	HB	1893–1900	181	3		
Andy Lochhead	Scotland	FW	1958–1968	266	128		
Matthew Lowton	England	DF	2015–2023	203	3		
Doug MacFarlane	England	U	1903–1908	125	34		
Phil Malley	England	MF	1984–1988	113	6		
Dean Marney	England	MF	2010–2018	221	10		
Harry Mather	England	FB	1938–1955	329	0		
Chris McCann	Republic of Ireland	DF/MF	2005–2013	268	31		
Andy McCluggage	Ireland*	FB	1925–1931	213	24		
Colin McDonald	England*	GK	1948–1950, 1951–1961	201	0		
John McGreal	England	DF	2004–2007	106	1		
Jimmy McIlroy	Northern Ireland*	MF/FW	1950–1963	497	131	(Note: Jimmy McIlroy was voted Burnley's PFA Fans' Favourite in 2007. McIlroy, of Northern Ireland, holds the record for most senior international caps as a Burnley player, with 51.)	
Tom McLintock	Scotland	FB	1893–1903	254	15		
Dwight McNeil	England	MF/FW	2018–2022	147	7		
Ian Measham	England	DF	1988–1993	230	2		
Ben Mee	England	DF	2011–2012, 2012–2022	376	12		
David Merrington	England	DF	1962–1971	126	2		
Brian Miller	England*	DF/MF	1954–1967	455	37	(Note: Brian Miller was manager of Burnley from 1979 to 1983 and again from 1986 to 1989.)	
Hugh Moffat	England	HB	1904–1910	214	13		
Mark Monington	England	DF	1989–1994	101	6		
Willie Morgan	Scotland*	MF/FW	1961–1968, 1975–1976	232	22		
Jonathan Morley	England	HB/FW	1908–1912	108	17		
Tony Morley	England	MF/FW	1976–1979, 1988	107	7		
Billy Morris	Wales*	FW	1939–1952	230	53		
Tommy Morrison	Ireland*	FW	1894–1895, 1897–1902, 1906–1907	195	28		
Eddie Mosscrop	England*	FW	1912–1922	198	20		
John Mullin	England	MF	1992–1995, 1998, 1999–2001	113	11		
Joe Neenan	England	GK	1985–1987	104	0		
Billy Nesbitt	England	HB/FW	1911–1923	192	20		
Doug Newlands	Scotland	HB/FW	1955–1959	104	23		
Keith Newton	England	DF	1972–1978	253	7		
Tom Nicol	Scotland	FB/FW	1891–1896	149	44		
Peter Noble	England	U	1973–1980	301	80		
Kurt Nogan	Wales	FW	1995–1997	108	42		
Geoff Nulty	England	MF	1968–1974	153	24		
James O'Connor	Republic of Ireland	MF	2004–2008	149	11		
Brian O'Neil	England	MF	1961–1970	282	25		
Vince Overson	England	DF	1979–1986, 1996–1998	264	7		
Louis Page	England*	FW	1925–1932	259	115		
George Parkin	England	HB	1924–1929	128	2		
Gary Parkinson	England	DF	1994–1997	163	5		
Martin Paterson	Northern Ireland*	FW	2008–2013	151	37		
Andy Payton	England	FW	1998–2003	176	81		
Chris Pearce	Wales	GK	1987–1992	236	0		
John Pender	Republic of Ireland	DF	1990–1995	222	11		
Mike Phelan	England	DF/MF	1980–1985	214	13		
Brian Pilkington	England*	MF/FW	1951–1961	340	77		
Walter Place	England	U	1886, 1890–1900	129	9	(Note: Walter Place scored Burnley's first-ever goal in the FA Cup, in 1886.)	
Walter Place	England	FW	1893–1900	187	36		
Ray Pointer	England*	FW	1957–1965	270	132		
Nick Pope	England*	GK	2016–2022	155	0		
Harry Potts	England	FW	1937–1950	181	50	(Note: Harry Potts was manager of Burnley from 1958 to 1970 and again from 1977 to 1979. He is the club's longest serving manager, having overseen 745 competitive matches and recording a club-record 321 wins. He also led Burnley to the 1959–60 First Division title.)	
Adrian Randall	England	MF	1991–1995	144	10		
Jerry Reynolds	Scotland	FB	1895–1900	124	0		
Gilbert Richmond	England	FB	1932–1939	193	2		
Connor Roberts‡	Wales*	DF	2021–present	130	8		
Alick Robinson	England	HB	1933–1945	221	9		
Jimmy Robson	England	FW	1956–1965	242	100		
Billy Rodaway	England	DF	1971–1981, 1986–1987	303	3		
Jay Rodriguez	England	FW	2007–2012, 2019–2025	310	76		
Harry Ross	Scotland	FB	1899–1904	111	2		
Derek Scott	England	DF	1975–1985	358	29		
Bobby Seith	Scotland	FB/HB	1949–1960	238	6		
Jason Shackell	England	DF	2012–2015	136	4		
Les Shannon	England	HB/FW	1949–1959	281	44		
Frank Sinclair	Jamaica	DF	2004–2007	102	1		
Len Smelt	England	FB	1919–1926	248	0	(Note: Len Smelt is the oldest player ever to appear for Burnley's first team, aged 41 years and 132 days when he played against Arsenal in 1925.)	
Albert Smith	England	FW	1905–1908	107	21		
Cecil Smith	Wales	FW	1932–1936	119	53		
Dave Smith	Scotland	FB/DF	1950–1961	108	1		
Dick Smith	England	FW	1904–1910	185	75		
Fred Smith	England	FB/DF	1959–1970	107	1		
Malcolm Smith	England	FW	1976–1980	102	20		
Paul Smith	England	DF/MF	1994–2001	128	5		
George Sommerville	Scotland	GK	1926–1932	124	0		
Junior Stanislas	England	MF	2011–2014	101	8		
John Steel	Scotland	HB	1925–1931	152	5		
Trevor Steven	England	MF	1981–1983	102	16		
Alan Stevenson	England	GK	1972–1983	543	0		
Jimmy Strong	England	GK	1946–1954	285	0	(Note: Jimmy Strong set a club record for most consecutive league appearances, with 203 between 1946 and 1951.)	
John Talbut	England	FB/DF	1957–1966	160	1		
James Tarkowski	England*	DF	2016–2022	219	7		
Charlie Taylor	England	DF	2017–2024	220	1		
David Taylor	Scotland	FB	1911–1924	250	5		
Gareth Taylor	Wales*	FW	2001–2003	106	37		
Joe Taylor	England	FB	1893–1907	352	14		
Steve Taylor	England	FW	1980–1983, 1987–1989	180	52		
Dave Thomas	England	MF/FW	1967–1972	179	23		
Mitchell Thomas	England	DF	1999–2002	112	0		
Ian Thomas-Moore	England	FW	2000–2005	216	50		
Steven Thompson	Scotland	FW	2008–2011	100	18		
Harry Thomson	Scotland*	GK	1959–1969	141	0		
Jim Thomson	Scotland	DF	1968–1981	364	6		
Sammy Todd	Northern Ireland*	DF	1962–1970	128	2		
Kieran Trippier	England	DF	2011–2015	185	7		
Chris Vinnicombe	England	DF	1994–1998	114	4		
Sam Vokes	Wales*	FW	2011–2019	267	64		
Colin Waldron	England	DF	1967–1976	356	18		
Ross Wallace	Scotland	MF	2010–2015	165	14		
Stephen Ward	Republic of Ireland*	DF/MF	2014–2019	113	4		
George Waterfield	England*	FB	1923–1935	394	5		
Billy Watson	England*	HB	1909–1925	380	20		
Walter Weaver	England	FW	1919–1924	116	18		
Paul Weller	England	MF	1993–2004	288	13		
Dean West	England	DF	1999–2004	178	6		
Ashley Westwood	England	MF	2017–2023	181	7		
Winston White	England	MF	1988–1991	128	21		
Mark Winstanley	England	DF	1994–1999	182	5		
Doug Winton	Scotland	FB	1947–1959	198	1		
Chris Wood	New Zealand*	FW	2017–2022	165	53		
Arthur Woodruff	England	FB	1936–1952	292	0		
Kevin Young	England	MF	1979–1984	156	12		
