= 1947 FA Cup final =

- Event: 1946–47 FA Cup
Charlton Athletic	Burnley
1	0
- After extra time
- Date: 26 April 1947
- Venue: Wembley Stadium, London
- Referee: Jim Wiltshire (Sherborne)
- Attendance: 98,215

The 1947 FA Cup final was the 66th final of the FA Cup. It took place on 26 April 1947 at Wembley Stadium and was contested between Charlton Athletic and Burnley. Charlton were appearing in their second consecutive final after losing to Derby County the previous year, while Second Division Burnley were appearing in their first final since 1914.

Charlton won the match 1–0 after extra time, with Chris Duffy scoring the winning goal. For the second consecutive year, the ball burst during the match; both incidents were later put down to the poor quality of leather available after World War II.

== Route to the final ==
=== Charlton ===
- Third round: 4–1 v Rochdale (home)
- Fourth round: 2–1 v West Brom (away)
- Fifth round: 1–0 v Blackburn (home)
- Quarter-finals: 2–1 v Preston (home)
- Semi-finals: 4–0 v Newcastle (neutral)

=== Burnley ===
- Third round: 5–1 v Aston Villa (home)
- Fourth round: 2–0 v Coventry (home)
- Fifth round: 3–0 v Luton (home)
- Quarter-finals: 1–1 v Middlesbrough (away) – Replay 1–0 (home)
- Semi-finals: 0–0 v Liverpool (neutral) – Replay 1–0 (neutral)

== Match details ==
26 April 1947
15:00 BST

Charlton Athletic	1–0 (a.e.t.)	Burnley
Duffy 114'	Report

Wembley Stadium, London
Attendance: 98,215
Referee: J. M. Wiltshire

Charlton Athletic	Burnley

GK	1	(England) Sam Bartram
RB	2	(England) Peter Croker
LB	3	(England) Jack Shreeve
RH	4	(England) Herbert Johnson
CH	5	(England) Harold Phipps
LH	6	(England) Bill Whittaker
OR	7	(England) Gordon Hurst
IR	8	(England) Tommy Dawson
CF	9	(England) William Robinson
IL	10	(England) Don Welsh (c)
OL	11	(Scotland) Chris Duffy
Manager:
(England) Jimmy Seed

GK	1	(England) George Strong
RB	2	(England) Arthur Woodruff
LB	3	(England) Harry Mather
RH	4	(England) Reg Attwell
CH	5	(England) Alan Brown (c)
LH	6	(England) George Bray
OR	7	(England) Jackie Chew
IR	8	(Wales) Billy Morris
CF	9	(England) Ray Harrison
IL	10	(England) Harry Potts
OL	11	(England) Peter Kippax
Manager:
(England) Cliff Britton
