= George Bray =

English footballer (1918–2002)

Personal information
- Full name: George Bray
- Date of birth: 11 November 1918
- Place of birth: Oswaldtwistle, England
- Date of death: 13 February 2002 (aged 83)
- Place of death: Hapton, England
- Position: Wing half

Senior career*
Years	Team	Apps	(Gls)
1937–1952	Burnley	241	(8)
- * Club domestic league appearances and goals

George Bray (11 November 1918 – 13 February 2002) was an English professional footballer who played as a wing half. He played his entire senior career with Burnley, making more than 250 appearances for the club in all competitions and forming part of the renowned defence known as the "Iron Curtain". After retiring from playing he remained at Burnley, firstly on the coaching staff and later as kit man before departing in 1992. In total, his association with the club as a player, coach, kit man and supporter spanned seven decades.

== Biography ==
George Bray was born in the town of Oswaldtwistle, Lancashire, on 11 November 1918. His older brother, Jackie Bray, was also a professional footballer and represented Manchester City and England. As a youth he played football for local club Great Harwood Town before signing his first contract with Football League Second Division side Burnley in 1937. Bray was married to Margaret (née Phillips), who died in 2012, and the couple had five children: David, Carol, Christine, Susan and George Philip. He died at a care home in Hapton on 13 February 2002, aged 83. His funeral took place at St Matthew's Church in nearby Burnley and was attended by more than 100 people, including former Burnley manager Stan Ternent and former player Brian Flynn.

== Playing career ==
Bray started his professional playing career with Burnley, signing his first contract with the club in October 1937. He soon became a regular fixture in the reserve team but did not make his senior debut for the club until September of the following year. Following a 0–4 defeat to Norwich City, Bray replaced William Smith at left-half for the next match. He quickly established himself as first choice, making 34 league appearances during the 1938–39 season. He played two matches at the start of the 1939–40 campaign before the league was abandoned due to the outbreak of the Second World War and all records were expunged. (Note: Joyce, who includes the expunged matches in the players' records, gives Bray's career statistics as 243 appearances rather than the 241 given in the Burnley F.C. official history.) During the war, Bray served in Northern Ireland and while there he played as a wartime guest with Belfast side Glentoran, where he played alongside future Burnley teammate Reg Kirkham. In 1942 he was part of the team that reached the final of the Irish Cup before losing 1–3 to rivals Linfield.

When the Football League resumed in 1946, Bray regained his place at left-half. Along with fellow half-backs Reg Attwell and captain Alan Brown, full-backs Harry Mather and Arthur Woodruff and goalkeeper Jimmy Strong, Bray was part of the Burnley defence known as the "Iron Curtain". The team conceded only 29 league goals during the 1946–47 season, the second lowest ever, as they finished as Second Division runners-up to Manchester City, thereby gaining promotion to the First Division. Bray appeared in all but one of the side's matches during the campaign and also played nine matches in the FA Cup as Burnley reached the final of the competition for the first time since 1914. He was selected in the starting line-up for the final but could not prevent opponents Charlton Athletic achieving a 1–0 victory.

Bray was ever-present the following season as Burnley finished third in the First Division on their return to the top flight of English football. He remained a regular first-team player for the following three seasons, playing 114 out of a possible 126 games, until losing his place ten matches into the 1951–52 campaign to youngster Jimmy Adamson. Bray made his final senior appearance for Burnley on 29 September 1951 in the 1–2 defeat away at Stoke City. After losing his starting berth, he continued to play for the reserve team until his retirement from professional football in the summer of 1952.

== After retirement ==
Upon retiring from playing, Bray joined the coaching staff at Burnley. He was initially a trainer for the club's A team and later assisted the reserves before being appointed first-team trainer under new manager Adamson in 1970. Bray retired from coaching four years later but remained at Turf Moor as the Burnley kit man. He left the club in 1992 but remained an ardent supporter and often returned to watch matches when in good health.

== Career statistics ==
Club	Season	Division	League		FA Cup		Total	
Club	Season	Division	Apps	Goals	Apps	Goals	Apps	Goals
Burnley	1938–39	Second Division	34	0	1	0	35	0
Burnley	1945–46	Second Division	–	–	0	0	0	0
Burnley	1946–47	Second Division	41	2	9	0	50	2
Burnley	1947–48	First Division	42	3	1	0	43	3
Burnley	1948–49	First Division	39	1	3	1	42	2
Burnley	1949–50	First Division	33	1	3	0	36	1
Burnley	1950–51	First Division	42	1	1	0	43	1
Burnley	1951–52	First Division	10	0	0	0	10	0
Career totals			241	8	18	1	259	9

== Honours ==
Burnley

- Football League Second Division second-place promotion: 1946–47
- FA Cup runner-up: 1946–47

Glentoran (wartime guest player)

- 1942: Irish Cup finalists

== Notes and references ==
Notes
