= Tommy Henderson (footballer, born 1927) =

English footballer

Personal information
- Full name: Thomas Henderson
- Date of birth: 1 October 1927
- Place of birth: Burnley, England
- Date of death: 31 May 2013 (aged 85)
- Position: Outside forward

Senior career*
Years	Team	Apps	(Gls)
1945–1951	Burnley	2	(0)
1951-1953	Rossendale United	86	(23)
	Nelson	?	(?)
- * Club domestic league appearances and goals

Thomas Henderson (1 October 1927 – 31 May 2013) was an English professional footballer who played as an outside forward. He appeared in the Football League for his hometown team Burnley, playing two senior matches for the club. He later moved into non-League football, assisting Rossendale United, Nelson and Bank Hall Colliery.

== Biography ==
Henderson was born in Burnley, Lancashire, on 1 October 1927 and grew up in the town, attending St Stephen's School and then Burnley Grammar School. He died on 31 May 2013, at the age of 85 and was one of the club's oldest surviving players at the time of his death.

== Playing career ==
Henderson, an outside right, joined Burnley as an amateur during the 1944–45 season and played three matches in the Wartime Football League. He established himself as a regular in the reserve team at Burnley over the following seasons and in 1948–49 was a part of the side that won the Central League title. He made his senior debut for the club on 12 September 1949 for the visit to Stoke City, taking the place of Scottish winger Ian Wilson, who had worn the number 7 shirt two days earlier in the defeat to Derby County. Burnley drew 1–1 at Stoke, Reg Attwell equalising with a penalty kick after the home side had taken the lead in the first minute of the game. Henderson was dropped in favour of Jack Spencer for the next match against West Bromwich Albion and was subsequently forced to wait another month for his second first-team appearance. His second and ultimately final league outing for Burnley came in the 0–1 defeat away at Fulham on 15 October 1949, after which regular outside right Jackie Chew returned to the team and kept his place for much of the remainder of the season. Henderson remained at Turf Moor for another season, but played solely for the reserve team and was released in May 1951.

After leaving Burnley, Henderson moved into non-League football, appearing for both Rossendale United and Nelson in the Lancashire Combination. He later had a spell with Bank Hall Colliery, with whom he won the Burnley Hospital Cup in 1958.
