= Rupert Cawthorne =

English footballer (1879–1965)

Personal information
- Full name: Rupert Cawthorne
- Date of birth: 13 April 1879
- Place of birth: Clitheroe, England
- Date of death: 1965 (aged 85)
- Place of death: Haslingden, England
- Height: 5 ft 7 in (1.70 m)
- Position: Centre half

Senior career*
Years	Team	Apps	(Gls)
1894–1898	Queen's Park (Clitheroe)		
1898–1899	Darwen	10	(0)
1902–1906	Clitheroe Central		
1906–1907	Burnley	20	(0)
1907	Clitheroe Central		
1907–1909	Burnley	4	(0)
1906–1909	Bacup		
- * Club domestic league appearances and goals

Rupert Cawthorne (13 April 1879 – 1965) was an English professional footballer who played as a centre half or full back. He played in the Football League for Darwen and Burnley and in non-league football for clubs including Clitheroe Central and Bacup.

== Life and career ==
Rupert Cawthorne was born on 13 April 1879 in Clitheroe, Lancashire, to Elijah Sylvester Newton Cawthorne, a professional artist and teacher of painting and drawing, and his wife, Louisa née Price. Cawthorne had four older brothers who all played football in the Clitheroe area, one of whom, Fred, followed in his father's footsteps and became well known locally as a portraitist and particularly as a landscape painter.

Cawthorne spent four seasons with local junior club Queen's Park before joining Football League Second Division club Darwen for the 1898–99 season. Both club and team were struggling. Over the 34-match season they conceded 141 goals, lost 18 consecutive matches, and were beaten 10–0 on three occasions; it would be their last season in the Football League. According to the Athletic News, he made a very promising display on his debut on 25 February 1899, playing at left back at home to Glossop North End. He played in nine more matches, including Darwen's last at Football League level, in which he and full-back partner Thomas Woolfall were "fast, cool and clever" as Darwen secured a 1–1 draw with Newton Heath – soon to rename themselves Manchester United.

He enlisted in the 11th Hussars in 1900; his record describes him as 5 ft 7 in (1.70 m) in height, physically well developed, with brown hair, grey eyes and a fresh complexion. The 1901 census finds him stationed in Canterbury Barracks. In October 1902, his father bought him out of the Army for £10.

When he returned home, he helped Clitheroe Congregational finish top of the Blackburn and District Sunday School League. The club renamed itself Clitheroe Central and joined the Lancashire Combination in 1903, and Cawthorne remained a loyal, consistent and popular player. According to a 1906 profile in the Lancashire Daily Post, he "filled the centre half position for a number of years, and plays with skill and judgment, feeding his forwards judiciously, and breaking up the attacks of opposing forwards, who find his play a sturdy stumbling block, for he tackles them fearlessly", and in that position "has few if any superiors in Division II of the Combination." Thirty years later, a retrospective in the Clitheroe Advertiser described him as "one of the best and most versatile of local players ... of the type that we often say are born, not made".

At the end of that season, Cawthorne signed for Second Division Burnley. He went straight into their league team at right half with Jonathan Cretney at centre half, displacing Fred Barron from the half-back line to right back. After the first match, Cretney and Cawthorne changed places, and Cawthorne continued in his preferred centre-half position until the turn of the year, when he lost his place through injury and, following the arrival of the ageing but still influential former England international centre half Alex Leake, did not regain it. He was not retained at the end of the season, and returned to Clitheroe Central. By the end of November 1907, his standard had "greatly improved", according to the Lancashire Daily Post, and Burnley re-signed him. He remained on their books for the next two-and-a-half seasons, but appeared only rarely for their first team – three times in the 1908–09 season and once in 1909–10.

Cawthorne left full-time professional football in 1910 for Lancashire Combination club Bacup. He captained the team to victory in the 1911 Lancashire Junior Cup and was still with them in the 1912–13 season.

He had married Elizabeth Duckett in 1910, and the 1911 Census records him as an employee of Pearl Assurance. During the First World War, he served with the Northumberland Fusiliers. By 1939, he was licensee of the Cross Keys beerhouse in Clitheroe, where he lived with Elizabeth and their son Gordon.

Cawthorne died at the age of 85 in Haslingden, Lancashire, in 1965.
