= Arthur Bell (footballer) =

English footballer

Personal information
- Date of birth: November 1882
- Place of birth: Burnley, England
- Date of death: 22 April 1923 (aged 40)
- Position: Inside forward

Senior career*
Years	Team	Apps	(Gls)
1902–1909	Burnley	101	(28)

International career
1907–1908	England amateur	3	(5)
- * Club domestic league appearances and goals

Arthur A. Bell (November 1882 – 22 April 1923) was an English footballer who played as an inside forward. He started his career with Burnley Belvedere before joining Football League side Burnley in 1902. Over the next seven years, Bell made 101 league appearances and scored 28 goals for the Lancashire club. During his career, he won three caps for the England national amateur football team. An architect by trade, Bell also played as an amateur cricketer for Burnley Cricket Club for 20 years, during which time he won five Lancashire League championships. He was selected to represent the Lancashire Second XI on three occasions.

== Biography ==
Bell was born in Burnley, Lancashire, in November 1882, one of three children born to Thomas and Elizabeth Bell. He was educated at the Burnley Grammar School. An amateur throughout his sporting career, he worked professionally as an architect and would often miss matches due to work commitments. In 1911, he was involved in the building of the new Brunshaw Road stand at the Turf Moor stadium in Burnley. He died on 22 April 1923, at the age of 40.

== Football ==
As a youth, Bell played amateur football with Burnley Belvedere before joining Football League Second Division side Burnley in February 1902. He made his debut for the club on 10 January 1903 in the 1–0 win against Lincoln City at Turf Moor; the winning goal was scored by Cuthbert Storey, who was also playing in his first senior match after transferring from Burnley Belvedere. Bell was selected once more in the 1902–03 campaign, playing at left inside forward in the 1–3 defeat to Leicester Fosse on 24 January 1903. He was unable to break into the team for the first five months of the following season due to the form of fellow inside forward William Jackson, a new signing from Barrow. He made his first appearance of the campaign in the goalless draw away at Grimsby Town on 30 January 1904. Bell scored his first competitive goal for Burnley in the 2–0 win over Gainsborough Trinity three weeks later, and on 12 March he scored a late goal in the 1–3 loss away to Manchester United. In total, Bell played eleven league matches during the 1903–04 season and scored four goals.

Bell was selected to play in the opening match of the 1904–05 season, a 1–4 home defeat to West Bromwich Albion. Bell kept his place in the side for the following match against Chesterfield, but was dropped for the trip to Bolton Wanderers in favour of youngster William Hutchinson, a summer signing from non-League club Alston. He was recalled for the visit of Liverpool on 22 October 1904, deputising for the unavailable Doug MacFarlane, but then spent more than two months out of the team. Bell made two further appearances for Burnley that season, playing in consecutive defeats to Bolton Wanderers and Blackpool in January 1905. He found himself more involved in the first-team during the 1905–06 campaign, making 19 league appearances. On 13 January 1906, he played in the first FA Cup game of his career as Burnley were eliminated by Southern League side Tottenham Hotspur in the first round. Bell scored his first goal of the season on 10 February 1906, netting the opening goal in the 2–2 draw against Burslem Port Vale. During March 1906, he scored in the home wins over Leeds City and Chelsea.

After missing the first three matches of the 1906–07 season due to cricketing commitments, Bell was chosen to replace McFarlane for the visit of Nottingham Forest on 15 September 1906. Two weeks later he scored twice in the 4–0 home win over Burton United, and went on to score three more goals in his next four appearances, including a late winner away at Leeds City. However, the victory was overshadowed by the news that Leeds forward Soldier Wilson had died after collapsing during the match. Bell went on to score a total of 12 goals in 1906–07, his highest return in a single season. His performances for Burnley led to a call-up from the England amateur team in April 1907, and he won his first cap in the 8–1 defeat of the Netherlands in The Hague, scoring two goals. In the match, he played alongside full England internationals Harold Hardman and Vivian Woodward, who, like Bell, was a professional architect. Bell was selected again for England against the same opposition on 21 December 1907, this time scoring a hat-trick in a 12–2 victory. He was also part of Great Britain's squad for the football tournament at the 1908 Summer Olympics, but he did not play in any matches.

Although he again missed the opening month of the following season, Bell quickly reclaimed his status as one of Burnley's first-choice players, starting 26 league matches during the campaign. He scored on his first appearance of the season in the 2–2 draw away at Derby County, and scored twice in the 5–1 win against Grimsby Town on 2 November 1907. Bell scored the only FA Cup goal of his career in the home tie against Southampton on 11 January 1908, but could not prevent the Southern League side securing a 2–1 victory. He continued to play for Burnley when work and cricket allowed in the 1908–09 campaign, making 15 league appearances. He scored twice during the season; he scored in the 1–4 defeat away at Oldham Athletic on 14 November, and scored the winning goal in the 3–2 defeat of Barnsley on 5 December. Bell played his 101st and final league game for Burnley in the 0–1 loss at Derby County on 26 December 1908. He retired from football shortly afterwards, stating that playing football in winter in addition to cricket during the summer, combined with managing an architecture practice, was too demanding.

=== Career statistics ===
Club	Season	League		FA Cup		Total	
Club	Season	Apps	Goals	Apps	Goals	Apps	Goals
Burnley	1902–03	2	0	0	0	2	0
Burnley	1903–04	11	4	0	0	11	4
Burnley	1904–05	5	0	0	0	5	0
Burnley	1905–06	19	3	1	0	20	3
Burnley	1906–07	23	12	1	0	24	12
Burnley	1907–08	26	7	1	1	27	8
Burnley	1908–09	15	2	0	0	15	2
Total		101	28	3	1	104	29

=== International goals ===
England Amateurs score listed first, score column indicates score after each Bell goal.

List of international goals scored by Arthur Bell
No.	Cap	Date	Venue	Opponent	Score	Result	Competition	Ref
1	1	1 April 1907	De Diepput, The Hague, Netherlands	Netherlands	2–0	8–1	Friendly	
2	1	1 April 1907	De Diepput, The Hague, Netherlands	Netherlands	7–1	8–1	Friendly	
3	2	21 December 1907	Feethams, Darlington, England	Netherlands	4–0	12–2	Friendly	
4	2	21 December 1907	Feethams, Darlington, England	Netherlands	10–1	12–2	Friendly	
5	2	21 December 1907	Feethams, Darlington, England	Netherlands	12–1	12–2	Friendly	

== Cricket ==
Aside from football, Bell was also an accomplished amateur cricketer; he assisted Burnley Cricket Club between 1899 and 1919, and would often choose to play cricket rather than football when the seasons overlapped. He was a member of the side that won the Lancashire League in 1901 and went on to captain the team that won three consecutive titles in 1906, 1907 and 1908. Bell won a fifth Lancashire League title with Burnley in the 1913 season. A left-handed batsman, he also bowled slow left arm. Bell represented the Lancashire Second XI on three occasions in 1905 and 1906. He was selected for two matches against the Surrey and Yorkshire second teams during the 1905 season and on 9 July 1906 he played in the Minor Counties Championship draw with Staffordshire at Turf Moor, entering play as a substitute after Herbert Rhodes was injured while fielding.

== See also ==
- List of Burnley F.C. players

== Bibliography ==
- Simpson, Ray (2007). The Clarets Chronicles: The Definitive History of Burnley Football Club. ISBN 978-0-9557468-0-2.
