= Harold Phipps =

English footballer

Personal information
- Date of birth: 15 January 1916
- Place of birth: Dartford, England
- Date of death: 2000 (aged 83–84)
- Position: Centre half

Senior career*
Years	Team	Apps	(Gls)
1946–1952	Charlton Athletic	185	(2)
1952–1954	Watford	47	(2)
- Bexleyheath & Welling
Total		232	(2)

Managerial career
- Bexleyheath & Welling
- * Club domestic league appearances and goals

Harold Phipps (15 January 1916 – 2000) was an English professional footballer who played as a centre half.

== Career ==
Born in Dartford, Phipps started his professional career during the Second World War, with Charlton Athletic. During the war he also made guest appearances for Chelsea and Fulham. Following the resumption of the Football League in 1946, Phipps made 185 league appearances for Charlton, scoring twice. He is perhaps better known for his appearances in the FA Cup; he was a losing finalist with Charlton in 1946, and was part of their cup-winning team in the following year's final. Phipps joined Watford in 1952, and went on to make 47 appearances in the Third Division South, scoring twice. He later player-managed non-league side Bexleyheath & Welling.

== Honours ==
Charlton Athletic

- FA Cup: 1946–47; runner-up: 1945–46
