= Fred Barron =

English footballer

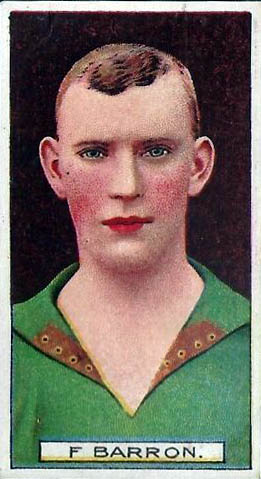
- Fred Barron in a 1907 Football card

Personal information
- Date of birth: 7 June 1879
- Place of birth: Stockton-on-Tees, England
- Date of death: 18 August 1939 (aged 60)
- Place of death: Burnley
- Position: Wing half

Senior career*
Years	Team	Apps	(Gls)
18xx–1898	Stockton St. Mary's		
1898–1911	Burnley	400	(13)
- * Club domestic league appearances and goals

Fred Barron (born 7 June 1879 – 18 August 1939) was an English professional footballer who played primarily as a wing half. He made exactly 400 Football League appearances in thirteen seasons with Burnley.

Born in Stockton-on-Tees, County Durham, Barron began his career with Northern League side Stockton St. Mary's in the late 1890s. Described as 'the best back in the Northern League', he was signed by newly promoted Football League First Division club Burnley in June 1898. At the start of the 1898–99 season, Barron was unable to displace David Beveridge from the right-half position. He made his debut for the club in the sixth match of the campaign, a 1–1 draw away at Sheffield United on 1 October 1898. Barron kept his place in the Burnley team for the remainder of the season, playing in 29 league matches and 2 FA Cup ties. He retained his starting berth for the majority of the 1899–1900 season, making 30 league appearances, but was dropped for the final two matches of the campaign in favour of Bill Jenkinson. The season ended in disappointment for Burnley as they were relegated to the Second Division after winning only 11 of their 34 fixtures.

Barron was an ever-present for Burnley during the 1900–01 season as the side finished third in the Second Division. On 26 January 1901 he scored his first Football League goal, netting the first in the 5–1 win against Chesterfield at Turf Moor. Barron scored again six matches later as Burnley were beaten 1–2 away at Barnsley. He made his 100th league appearance for Burnley on 12 October 1901 in the 0–3 home defeat to local rivals Preston North End, and was again almost ever-present in the 1901–02 season. He scored a penalty kick in the 1–0 win against Newton Heath, who would later become Manchester United, on 28 March 1902, Burnley's last win of the campaign. Barron played in all 99 of the side's competitive fixtures between March 1902 and January 1905, scoring seven goals (five of them penalties) during this period. During the 1902–03 campaign, he had a brief spell at outside forward following the departure of Tommy Morrison to Manchester United.

On 8 October 1904, Barron played his 200th league match for Burnley in the 1–3 loss to Gainsborough Trinity, the first in a run of seven consecutive defeats. He missed only one game during the 1904–05 season; his place at right-half was taken by David Walders for the 0–2 defeat away at Blackpool on 21 January 1905. Barron then played 37 competitive matches for Burnley in the 1905–06 season, scoring once. Following the arrival of half-back Rupert Cawthorne from Clitheroe before the 1906–07 campaign, Barron began to play at right-fullback. For the fourth time in his Burnley career, he played in every Second Division game during the campaign. His 300th Football League appearance came in the final match of the season, a 1–1 draw with Glossop at Turf Moor.

Barron remained a regular member of the Burnley team well into the 1909–10 season, but found himself out of the side after the death of manager Spen Whittaker in April 1910. The Burnley directors selected youngster Tom Bamford for the last eight matches of the campaign. The Horwich-born defender would go on to play 137 league games for the Clarets. In the summer of 1910, new manager John Haworth signed Scottish fullback Bob Reid from Cowdenbeath, and Barron subsequently found his first-team opportunities limited, playing only four matches in the 1910–11 campaign. He made his 400th and final league appearance for Burnley in the goal-less draw with Barnsley on 1 April 1911. Barron retired from professional football at the end of the season, aged 31, and later became the landlord of a public house in Burnley town centre.

Barron died 18 August 1939 at his home in Burnley following a long illness, he was 60 years old.

== Career statistics ==
Club	Season	League		FA Cup		Total	
Club	Season	Apps	Goals	Apps	Goals	Apps	Goals
Burnley	1898–99	29	0	2	0	31	0
Burnley	1899–1900	30	0	1	0	31	0
Burnley	1900–01	34	2	3	0	37	2
Burnley	1901–02	32	2	2	1	34	3
Burnley	1902–03	34	3	1	0	35	3
Burnley	1903–04	34	1	2	0	36	1
Burnley	1904–05	33	3	2	0	35	3
Burnley	1905–06	36	1	1	0	37	1
Burnley	1906–07	38	1	1	0	39	1
Burnley	1907–08	37	0	1	0	38	0
Burnley	1908–09	31	0	5	0	36	0
Burnley	1909–10	28	0	2	0	30	0
Burnley	1910–11	4	0	0	0	4	0
Total		400	13	23	1	423	14

== See also ==
- List of Burnley F.C. players
