= Cretney =

Cretney is a surname. Notable people with the surname include:

- David Cretney (born 1954), Manx politician and entrepreneur
- Jonathan Cretney (1879–1956), British footballer
- Ron Cretney, Manx politician
- Stephen Cretney (1936–2019), British legal scholar
- Thomas Grant Cretney (1870–1938), American politician and businessman
