= UEFA Nations League records and statistics =

This is a list of records and statistics for the UEFA Nations League, an international European football competition played by the senior men's national teams of the member associations of UEFA, the sport's European governing body.

== Records and statistics ==
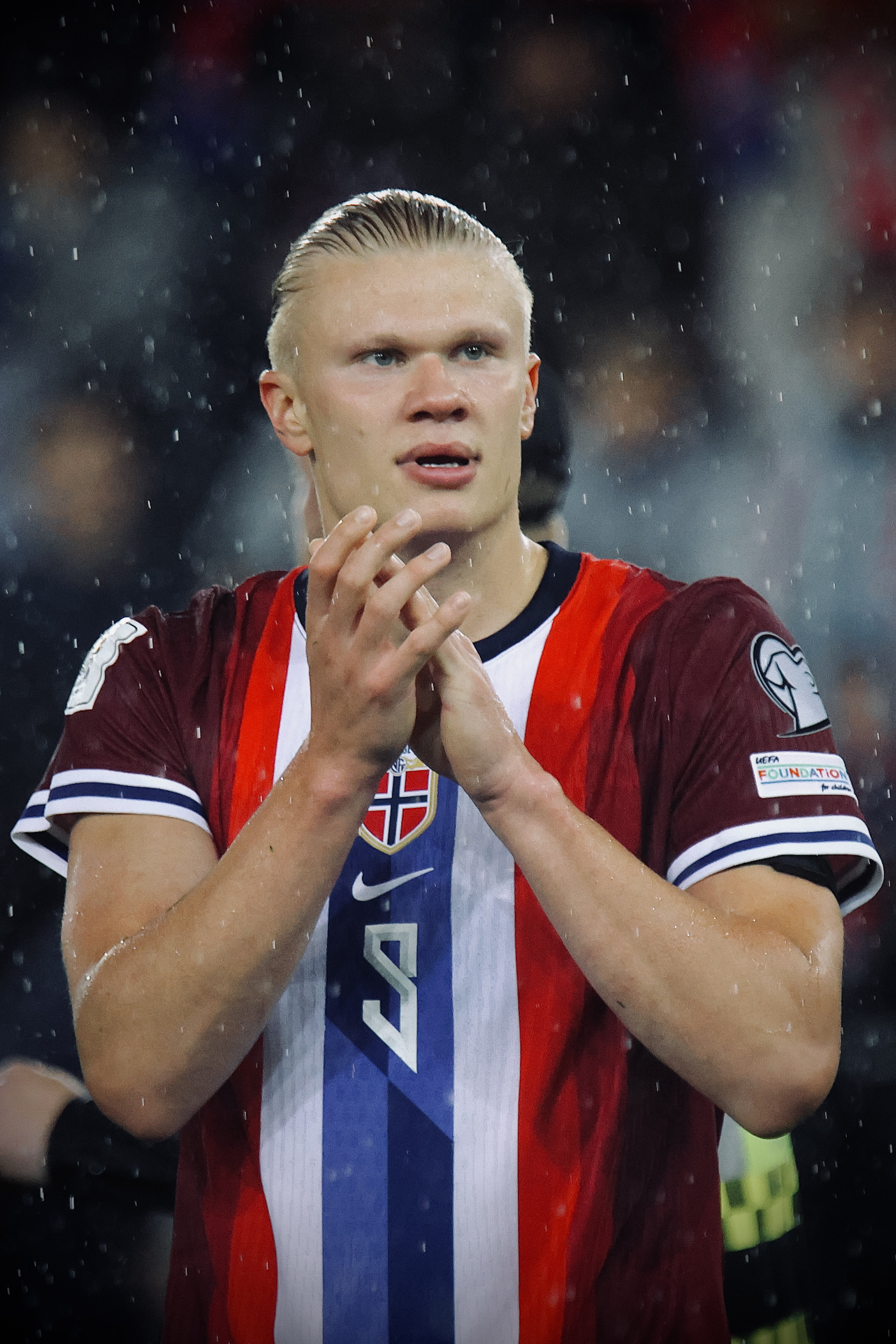
Erling Haaland is the all-time top goalscorer in the Nations League.

=== Top goalscorers ===
As of matches played 17 November 2026

Rank	Player	Goals
1	(Norway) Erling Haaland	25
2	(Sweden) Viktor Gyökeres	16
3	(Serbia) Aleksandar Mitrović	15
3	(Portugal) Cristiano Ronaldo	15
5	(England) Harry Kane	14
5	(Belgium) Romelu Lukaku	14
5	(Kosovo) Vedat Muriqi	14
8	(France) Kylian Mbappé	10
8	(Luxembourg) Danel Sinani	10
10	(Bosnia and Herzegovina) Edin Džeko	9
10	(Denmark) Christian Eriksen	9
10	(Iceland) Orri Óskarsson	9
10	(Spain) Mikel Oyarzabal	9

=== Top goalscorers by tournament ===
Season	League A		League B		League C		League D	
Season	Player(s)	Goals	Player(s)	Goals	Player(s)	Goals	Player(s)	Goals
2018–19	(Switzerland) Haris Seferovic	5	(Bosnia and Herzegovina) Edin Džeko (Czech Republic) Patrik Schick	3	(Serbia) Aleksandar Mitrović	6	(Armenia) Yura Movsisyan (Belarus) Stanislaw Drahun	5
2020–21	(Belgium) Romelu Lukaku (Spain) Ferran Torres	6	(Norway) Erling Haaland	6	(Albania) Sokol Cikalleshi (Estonia) Rauno Sappinen (Montenegro) Stevan Jovetić (Slovenia) Haris Vučkić	4	(Faroe Islands) Klæmint Olsen	4
2022–23	(Belgium) Michy Batshuayi (Croatia) Luka Modrić (Netherlands) Steven Bergwijn (Netherlands) Memphis Depay	3	(Norway) Erling Haaland (Serbia) Aleksandar Mitrović	6	(Georgia (country)) Khvicha Kvaratskhelia (Kosovo) Vedat Muriqi	5	(Latvia) Vladislavs Gutkovskis	5
2024–25	(Portugal) Cristiano Ronaldo	8	(Norway) Erling Haaland	7	(Sweden) Viktor Gyökeres	9	(Gibraltar) Liam Walker (San Marino) Nicola Nanni	2
2026–27	In progress		(Republic of Ireland) Troy Parrott (Sweden) Viktor Gyökeres	6	(Iceland) Andri Guðjohnsen	6	(Andorra) Guillaume López (Azerbaijan) Mahir Emreli (Malta) Teddy Teuma	2

=== Player records ===
==== Appearances ====
Youngest player to appear
16 years, 261 days, Luca Scanlon (Gibraltar, vs Latvia, 31 March 2026, 2025–26 promotion/relegation play-offs)

Youngest player to appear, group stage
16 years, 301 days, Patrik Kristal (Estonia, vs Sweden, 8 September 2024, 2024–25 group stage)

Youngest player to appear, knockout stage
17 years, 62 days, Gavi (Spain, vs Italy, 6 October 2021, 2020–21 semi-finals)

Youngest player to appear in a final
17 years, 66 days, Gavi (Spain, vs France, 10 October 2021, 2021 final)

Oldest player to appear
43 years, 14 days, Lee Casciaro (Gibraltar, vs Liechtenstein, 13 October 2024, 2024–25 group stage)

Oldest player to appear, knockout stage
40 years, 123 days, Cristiano Ronaldo (Portugal, vs Spain, 8 June 2025, 2025 final)

==== Goalscoring ====
Youngest goalscorer
17 years, 124 days, Konstantinos Karetsas (Greece, vs Scotland, 23 March 2025, 2024–25 promotion/relegation play-offs)

Youngest goalscorer, group stage
17 years, 304 days, Gavi (Spain, vs Czech Republic, 5 June 2022, 2022–23 group stage)

Youngest goalscorer, knockout stage
17 years, 253 days, Lamine Yamal (Spain, vs Netherlands, 23 March 2025, 2024–25 quarter-finals)

Youngest goalscorer in a final
22 years, 192 days, Gonçalo Guedes (Portugal, vs Netherlands, 9 June 2019, 2019 final)

Oldest goalscorer
41 years, 17 days, Luka Modrić (Croatia, vs Czech Republic, 26 September 2026, 2026–27 group stage)

Oldest goalscorer in a final
40 years, 123 days, Cristiano Ronaldo (Portugal, vs Spain, 8 June 2025, 2025 final)

==== Winners ====
Youngest winner
18 years, 34 days, Rodrigo Mora, Portugal (2024–25) (Note: Mora was in the Portugal squad for the 2025 Finals, but was an unused substitute.)

Youngest winner to appear in the final
18 years, 317 days, Gavi, Spain (2023 final)

Oldest winner
40 years, 123 days, Cristiano Ronaldo, Portugal (2024–25)

== See also ==
- FIFA World Cup records and statistics
- UEFA European Championship records and statistics
