= Peter Kippax =

Peter Kippax may refer to:

- Peter Kippax (footballer) (1922–1987) was an English amateur footballer who played for Great Britain at the 1948 Summer Olympics
- Peter Kippax (cricketer) (1940–2017), English first-class cricketer
