= Jack Butterfield =

Jack Butterfield may refer to:

- Jack Butterfield (ice hockey) (1919–2010), ice hockey administrator
- Jack Butterfield (footballer) (1922–2001), English footballer
- Jack Butterfield (baseball) (1929–1979), American college baseball coach and baseball executive
