= Chris Duffy (footballer, born 1918) =

Scottish footballer

Personal information
- Full name: Christopher Duffy
- Date of birth: 21 October 1918
- Place of birth: Methil, Scotland
- Date of death: 20 February 1978 (aged 59)
- Place of death: Northern Ireland
- Position: Outside left

Youth career
- Wellesley Juniors

Senior career*
Years	Team	Apps	(Gls)
1936–1945	Leith Athletic	63	(13)
1946–1953	Charlton Athletic	162	(33)
- * Club domestic league appearances and goals

Christopher Duffy (21 October 1918 – 20 February 1978) was a Scottish footballer who played as a left winger in the English Football League. He scored the only goal for Charlton Athletic in extra time in the 1947 FA Cup Final, against Burnley.

Duffy, a fast and intelligent winger, first came to Charlton Athletic as a war time guest player. A modest fee of £330 persuaded his home club, Leith Athletic to relinquish his services when he was demobilised from the armed forces. His appearance against Burnley was his third Cup Final. He aided Charlton against Chelsea in the 1944 "South" Final and against Derby County the following year.

== Honours ==
Charlton Athletic

- FA Cup: 1946–47; runner-up: 1945–46
