= Jack Billingham (footballer) =

English footballer

Personal information
- Full name: John Billingham
- Date of birth: 3 December 1914
- Place of birth: Daventry, England
- Date of death: 7 October 1981 (aged 66)
- Place of death: Northampton, England
- Height: 5 ft 9 in (1.75 m)
- Position: Centre forward

Senior career*
Years	Team	Apps	(Gls)
1935–1936	Northampton Town	3	(0)
1937–1938	Bristol City	7	(0)
1938–1949	Burnley	93	(36)
1949–1951	Carlisle United	64	(17)
1951–1955	Southport	150	(37)
1955–1957	Nelson	?	(?)
Total		317	(90)
- * Club domestic league appearances and goals

John Billingham (3 December 1914 – 7 October 1981) was an English professional footballer who played as a centre forward. During his career he represented Northampton Town, Bristol City, Burnley, Carlisle United and Southport in the Football League, playing more than 300 matches in total. He also served with the Royal Air Force during the Second World War.

== Career ==
Billingham started his football career in 1935 as an outside forward with Northampton Town, where he made three league appearances before joining Bristol City two years later. He spent one season with the club and played seven league matches as the team finished as runners-up in the Third Division South. In May 1938, Billingham signed for Second Division side Burnley on a free transfer. He made his debut for the Lancashire club in the 1–0 defeat away at Tottenham Hotspur on 27 December 1938. During his time at Burnley, he was converted from an outside right to a centre forward. He scored seven goals in fourteen matches for the club before play was suspended in England following the outbreak of the Second World War.

During the war, Billingham served abroad with the Royal Air Force and also worked in a shoe factory in Northampton. He made several appearances as a wartime guest player with his first club, Northampton Town. When competitive play resumed in 1946, Billingham was a first-team regular for Burnley, scoring 12 goals in 28 matches as the side finished as runners-up in the Second Division and reached the 1947 FA Cup Final, although he did not play in the match as Ray Harrison was selected ahead of him. The second place league finish meant promotion to the First Division and Billingham kept his place as first-choice centre forward in the higher division, netting 13 goals in 35 league matches during the 1947–48 campaign and helping Burnley to a third-place finish. He spent one more season with the Clarets, but was less involved with the first team and played only 16 matches. In total, he made 96 appearances for Burnley in all competitions and scored 36 goals for the club.

In September 1949, Billingham joined Third Division North side Carlisle United, where he spent two seasons and scored 17 goals in 64 league matches. He transferred to Southport in March 1951 and was almost ever-present during his four years with the Haig Avenue club, making 150 appearances and scoring 37 goals. Billingham was released by Southport at the end of the 1954–55 season and moved into non-league football with Nelson, where he played for two years before eventually retiring from the game in 1957 at the age of 42. Following his retirement, he worked as a travelling salesman and also had a spell as a coach at Padiham before returning to live in Daventry, Northamptonshire, where he died on 7 October 1981, aged 66.
