= Reg Attwell =

English footballer (1920–1986)

Personal information
- Full name: Frederick Reginald Attwell
- Date of birth: 23 March 1920
- Place of birth: Shifnal, England
- Date of death: 1 December 1986 (aged 66)
- Place of death: Burnley, England
- Height: 5 ft 11 in (1.80 m)
- Position: Wing half

Senior career*
Years	Team	Apps	(Gls)
1937–1946	West Ham United	5	(0)
1946–1954	Burnley	244	(9)
1954–1955	Bradford City	24	(0)
Total		273	(9)

International career
1949	Football League XI	1	(0)
- * Club domestic league appearances and goals

Frederick Reginald Attwell (23 March 1920 – 1 December 1986) was an English professional association footballer who played as a right wing-half. He played in the Football League for West Ham United, Burnley and Bradford City, and also had spells in non-league football.

== Personal life ==
Attwell was born in Shifnal, Shropshire, the son of a footballer. During the Second World War, he served in the British Army with the Essex Regiment. Following the conclusion of his football career, he lived in Burnley, Lancashire, where he resided until his death at the age of 66.

== Career ==
Attwell started his career in non-league football with Denaby United, before signing for West Ham United in the 1937–38 season. He made his league debut for the club in a 3–1 defeat at Sheffield United on 23 April 1938, but did not play again before the outbreak of the Second World War. In wartime, Attwell appeared as a guest player for Leeds United, making his debut on 21 February 1942 in the 0–1 defeat to Blackburn Rovers. He played one more game for Leeds in 1943. Between October 1942 and September 1945 he played 35 games, scoring 3 goals as a guest for Doncaster Rovers. He later joining Burnley as a wartime guest in 1945. He scored one goal in 15 matches for Burnley in the 1945–46 campaign before returning to West Ham. Upon his return, Attwell played four more league games for the Hammers, before joining Burnley on a permanent transfer in October 1946.

Attwell played his first competitive match for Burnley on 9 November 1946 in the 1–1 draw with Luton Town. He went on to play 22 league games during his debut season, as well as six matches in the FA Cup as the side reached the final of the competition. He was in the starting line-up for the final as Burnley lost 0–1 to Charlton Athletic. Attwell remained manager Cliff Britton's first-choice right-half throughout the following season, missing only four games of the campaign. He scored his first goal for Burnley on 24 April 1948, netting the second goal in the 2–0 away victory over Chelsea. During the 1948–49 season, Attwell made 38 first-team appearances for Burnley and scored five goals (four of them penalty kicks). His performances earned him a call-up to the Football League representative side for a match against the Scottish League in 1949. Following this, Attwell was widely expected to be selected for the England national football team, but he was never chosen to play for his country.

On 3 September 1949, Attwell played his 100th league game for Burnley in the 1–0 win away at Birmingham City. He retained his place in the Burnley side throughout the 1949–50 campaign, making 43 first team appearances. At the beginning of the next season, he found his place in the team taken by Len Martindale for the first two matches. However, Martindale then found himself replaced by Reg Kirkham for the next seven games before Harold Rudman played the following two matches. Attwell regained his place in the line-up on 14 October 1950 for the 5–1 home win against Charlton Athletic. He was restricted to 17 league games for the side during the 1950–51 season as Jimmy Adamson took the right wing-half slot from February 1951 until the end of the campaign.

Attwell regained his first-team place in the summer of 1951 and went on to make 71 league appearances in the next two seasons. In the 1953–54 campaign, he was forced to share his first-team berth with Bobby Seith and only played 20 matches in the side. After eight years with the club, Attwell made his final appearance for Burnley on 4 September 1954 in the 0–2 loss to Everton at Turf Moor. With a total of 11 goals in 269 first-team matches for the Clarets, Attwell left Burnley in October 1954 to join Bradford City on a free transfer.

Attwell played 24 league games for Bradford during the remainder of the 1954–55 season, but left the club in the summer of 1955. He subsequently returned to non-league football, having a short spell with Darwen before retiring from the game in 1956.

== Honours ==
Burnley

- FA Cup runner-up: 1946–47

== Bibliography ==
- Simpson, Ray (2007). The Clarets Chronicles: The Definitive History of Burnley Football Club 1882–2007. Burnley Football Club. ISBN 978-0-9557468-0-2.
