= Tony Hapgood =

English footballer

Personal information
- Full name: Edris Anthony Hapgood
- Date of birth: 13 June 1930
- Place of birth: Kettering, England
- Date of death: 1 September 2011 (aged 81)
- Place of death: Blackburn, England
- Position: Winger

Senior career*
| Years | Team | Apps | (Gls) |
| 1948–1952 | Burnley | 7 | (2) |
| 1953 | Watford | 1 | (0) |
| 1954–1955 | Ashford Town | 18 | (4) |
| | Chatham Town | ? | (?) |
- * Club domestic league appearances and goals

Edris Anthony "Tony" Hapgood (1930–2011) was an English professional footballer who played as a winger. The son of Arsenal and England great Eddie Hapgood, he played in the Football League for Burnley and Watford during the 1950s.
