= Jack Spencer (footballer) =

English footballer

Personal information
- Full name: John Shepherd Spencer
- Date of birth: 24 August 1920
- Place of birth: Bacup, England
- Date of death: 1966 (aged 45 or 46)
- Position: Inside forward

Senior career*
Years	Team	Apps	(Gls)
1948–1951	Burnley	37	(8)
1951–1952	Accrington Stanley	29	(7)
Total		66	(15)
- * Club domestic league appearances and goals

John Shepherd Spencer (24 August 1920 – 1966) was an English professional footballer who played as an inside forward.
