= John Steel (footballer, born 1902) =

Scottish footballer (1902–1976)

Personal information
- Full name: John Steel
- Date of birth: 24 October 1902
- Place of birth: Denny, Scotland
- Date of death: 1976 (aged 73–74)
- Place of death: Denny, Scotland
- Height: 5 ft 7 in (1.70 m)
- Position: Wing half

Senior career*
Years	Team	Apps	(Gls)
- Denny Hibernian
1921–1925	Hamilton Academical	127	(10)
1925–1931	Burnley	145	(5)
Total		272	(15)
- * Club domestic league appearances and goals

John Steel (24 October 1902 – 1976) was a Scottish professional footballer who played as a wing half for Hamilton Academical and Burnley. In 1923 he was a guest member of Third Lanark's squad which toured South America.

His wife Isa was the sister of George Sommerville, a teammate at Hamilton and Burnley.
