= Alan Brown (footballer, born 1914) =

English footballer (1914–1996)

Personal information
- Full name: Alan Winston Brown
- Date of birth: 26 August 1914
- Place of birth: Corbridge, England
- Date of death: 8 March 1996 (aged 81)
- Place of death: Barnstaple, England
- Position: Centre half

Senior career*
Years	Team	Apps	(Gls)
1933–1946	Huddersfield Town	57	(0)
1946–1948	Burnley	88	(0)
1948–1949	Notts County	13	(0)
Total		156	(0)

Managerial career
- 1954–1957: Burnley
- 1957–1964: Sunderland
- 1964–1968: Sheffield Wednesday
- 1968–1972: Sunderland
- 1973–1974: Hamarkameratene
- * Club domestic league appearances and goals

Alan Winston Brown (26 August 1914 – 8 March 1996) was an English professional footballer and manager. As a player he played for Huddersfield Town, Burnley and Notts County. After a short spell at Sheffield Wednesday as coach he re-joined Burnley as manager before further managerial spells at Sunderland, Sheffield Wednesday and Sunderland again.

== Early life ==
Born in Corbridge, Northumberland, Brown is best remembered for his managerial career. Although he never won a major trophy, he was regarded as one of football's most inventive tactical minds and earned a reputation for honesty and openness amongst his peers. His passion for the game is illustrated by a famous quote in which he, in all sincerity, described football as "one of the biggest things that happened in Creation."

Brown was the son of a painter and decorator and was sent to Hexham Grammar School as a child. Whilst there he developed a desire to become a teacher. However, growing up during the Great Depression as part of a large working-class family, Brown's parents were unable to afford to pay for his further education. Brown's other passion was for football; however, as Hexham played rugby he had to play as a standoff half for his school side on Saturday mornings and then as a centre half for Corbridge United in the afternoons. Brown was a cousin of the England international footballer Austen Campbell, who played as a half-back for Huddersfield Town and Blackburn Rovers.

== Playing career ==
=== Huddersfield Town ===
In 1933, Brown was persuaded by his cousin Austen Campbell, who was the captain of Huddersfield Town at the time, to join the club as a trainee. Brown hoped that the club would sponsor his further education, although he soon realised that he was regarded as little more than a member of the ground staff at Huddersfield and that the club had no interest in funding his study. Unable to settle, he left the club and spent the following 2 1/2 years as a policeman.

Brown's love for football eventually led him to quit the police force but as the rules of the day did not allow players to change clubs he was forced to re-join Huddersfield Town. He made 57 league appearances for Huddersfield before League football was suspended in September 1939 due to the Second World War.

=== Burnley ===
Following the war, Brown was finally given a transfer and moved to Burnley. By the opening day of the 1946–47 season Brown was 32; however, new Burnley manager Cliff Britton saw potential in Brown despite his advancing years. Brown was seen as a natural leader and was given the captaincy. In his first season at the club Brown formed what became known as the "Iron Curtain Defence" with fellow defenders Reg Attwell, George Bray, Arthur Woodruff, Harold Mather and goalkeeper Jimmy Strong. Burnley earned promotion from the Second Division at the first attempt, conceding just 29 goals along the way. This figure is still a club record low in a 42-game season, Brown having played in every one. The club also reached the FA Cup final in the same year, losing 1–0 to Charlton Athletic.

Another good season followed in 1947–48 with Brown missing just six games and Burnley managing to finish third in the First Division, with only goal average separating them from Manchester United in second place. The defence was again an integral part of Burnley's success, conceding just 43 goals despite the change of division, with only champions Arsenal conceding fewer.

=== Notts County ===
Ten games into the 1948–49 season Burnley accepted an offer in the region of £15,000 for Brown from Notts County. This was seen as a shock move by Burnley as Brown was still club captain and a first team regular, although this was a huge amount of money at the time to recoup for a 34-year-old defender. His stay at Notts County was only short, however, and after just three months and 13 League games, Brown retired from professional football.

== Coaching career ==
Upon retiring from playing football Brown moved back to Burnley and opened a restaurant. After a few years he was persuaded by the then Secretary of the Football Association, Stanley Rous, to return to the game, and in 1951 he joined Sheffield Wednesday as a coach. After 3 1/2 seasons at Wednesday, Brown left to start a managerial career.

=== Back to Burnley ===
In 1954, Brown returned once more to Burnley when he was appointed as manager. His arrival back at the club was not well received by some of the senior players at Burnley who were unhappy in anticipation of being managed by such a figure of moral integrity. Undeterred by the potential backlash, Brown set about instilling in the club the same values of integrity, hard work and honesty that he held dear.

He oversaw the development of a new training centre on the outskirts of the town, and, as well as using paid labour, helped to dig out the ground himself. Brown also "volunteered" several of his players to help out, including big names such as Jimmy McIlroy and Jimmy Adamson.

Perhaps to compensate for his own poor treatment as a youngster, Brown, with the support of new chairman Bob Lord, developed a strong youth setup at Burnley which continued to be fruitful long after his departure. He also became known for his tactics and his pioneering use of short corners and huge array of free kick routines which were copied across the land.

Brown kept Burnley in the top half of the First Division for three seasons but could not resist the opportunity to move back to the North East and manage his boyhood club, and was appointed as manager of Sunderland in the 1957 off-season.

=== Sunderland ===
Brown was appointed as Sunderland manager at a time when the club was in the middle of a series of scandals over illegal payments to players and was struggling at the bottom of the First Division table. Brown saw the appointment as an opportunity to "clean up" the club that he had supported as a child. At a time when paying young players' parents bribe money to sign for a particular club was commonplace, Brown refused to do so:

On two occasions parents have said to me, when I came to the point of signing their lads, "Well, what about a bit of so and so?" My reply was, "Look, you can take your boy home if you like, but you won't get anything illegal here." Then they said, "Well, what about a suit of clothes for the lad?" I replied, "If and when he goes abroad with us he'll get his blazer and flannels like everybody else." – Alan Brown, 1968.

Despite Brown's arrival, Sunderland were relegated at the end of his first season at Roker Park. Over the following years Brown gradually turned the club's fortunes around whilst simultaneously clearing out the corruption. The club finally earned promotion back to the First Division in the 1963–64 season, however Brown shocked the fans when he quit the club at the end of the season.

=== Sheffield Wednesday ===
Brown was lured to Sheffield Wednesday, and Hillsborough Stadium, which was at the time the "most sumptuously-appointed stadium in the land", before the start of the 1964–65 season. The board had specifically targeted Brown with the aim of cleaning up the club in the wake of the match fixing scandal that had recently affected the Owls. Brown was well respected amongst the players and quickly restored pride in the club.

Brown led the club to the 1966 FA Cup final, their first final in over 30 years. Wednesday met Everton in the final, who had made it there without conceding a goal whilst Wednesday had won every match away from home on the first attempt. Wednesday dominated for the first hour of the game going into a 2–0 lead, but Everton mounted a comeback and went on to win the match 3–2. The game is widely regarded as one of the best finals to be held at the old Wembley.

Brown remained at the club until February 1968 at which point he re-joined Sunderland.

=== Sunderland again and later career ===
Brown was relegated with Sunderland again in the 1969–70 season, and after two failed attempts to regain promotion he was sacked in November 1972.

Brown spent time coaching in Norway and assisting at Plymouth Argyle. He then left the game completely and spent a retirement blighted by ill health until his death in Barnstaple, Devon, in 1996.

== Managerial statistics ==
Team	Nat	From	To	Record				
Team	Nat	From	To	G	W	L	D	Win %
Burnley	(England)	August 1954	July 1957	135	56	31	48	41.48
Sunderland	(England)	June 1957	June 1964	332	138	106	88	41.57
Sheffield Wednesday	(England)	July 1964	February 1968	174	60	70	44	34.48
Sunderland	(England)	February 1968	November 1972	200	60	77	63	30.00

== Honours ==
Burnley

- FA Cup runner-up: 1946–47
