= William Hutchinson (footballer) =

English footballer

Personal information
- Full name: William Hutchinson
- Place of birth: England
- Position: Inside forward

Senior career*
Years	Team	Apps	(Gls)
19xx–1904	Alston	?	(?)
1904	Burnley	1	(0)
- * Club domestic league appearances and goals

William Hutchinson was an English professional footballer who played as an inside forward. He played for Alston before joining Football League Second Division side Burnley in August 1904. He played his only senior match for Burnley on 10 September 1904 in the 0–4 defeat away at Bolton Wanderers. Hutchinson left the club in 1904, and his whereabouts thereafter are untraced.
