= Thomas Woolfall =

English footballer

Personal information
- Full name: Thomas Woolfall
- Date of birth: 1871
- Place of birth: Darwen, England
- Position: Right-back

Senior career*
Years	Team	Apps	(Gls)
1898–1899	Darwen	30	(0)
1899–1900	Burnley	33	(0)
1900–1901	Bolton Wanderers	21	(0)
Total		84	(0)
- * Club domestic league appearances and goals

Thomas Woolfall (born 1871, date of death unknown) was an English professional footballer who played as a right-back.
