= David Beveridge =

Scottish footballer

Personal information
- Full name: David Beveridge
- Place of birth: Scotland
- Position: Wing half

Senior career*
Years	Team	Apps	(Gls)
- Albion Rovers
1896–1899	Burnley	20	(0)
1899–1900	Grimsby Town	5	(2)
- * Club domestic league appearances and goals

David Beveridge was a Scottish professional footballer who played as a defender.
