= Gordon Haigh =

English footballer (1921–2011)

Personal information
- Full name: Gordon Haigh
- Date of birth: 18 August 1921
- Place of birth: Barnsley, England
- Date of death: 22 August 2011 (aged 90)
- Place of death: Nelson, England
- Position: Inside forward

Senior career*
Years	Team	Apps	(Gls)
1946–1950	Burnley	18	(3)
1950–1951	Bournemouth & Boscombe	17	(3)
1951–1952	Watford	29	(5)
1952-1953	Rossendale United	44	(7)
	Nelson	?	(?)
- * Club domestic league appearances and goals

Gordon Haigh (18 August 1921 – 22 August 2011) was an English professional footballer who played as an inside forward.

Having played 18 league games for Burnley in the four league seasons after World War II, he was the club's second oldest surviving player by the time of his death on 22 August 2011, four days after his 90th birthday – second only to George Knight, who was three months older and died 10 days later.
