= Wilf Wrigley =

English footballer

Wilfred Wrigley
Personal information
- Date of birth: 4 October 1949 (age 75)
- Place of birth: Clitheroe, England
- Position(s): Half back

Senior career*
| Years | Team | Apps | (Gls) |
| 1968–1970 | Burnley | 6 | (1) |
- *Club domestic league appearances and goals

Wilfred Wrigley (born 4 October 1949) is an English former professional footballer who played as a half back. Born in Clitheroe, he came through the Burnley youth team, and played in the side that won the FA Youth Cup in 1968. Wrigley made his senior debut on 23 November 1968 in the 0–2 defeat to Sunderland at Roker Park. He played four league matches in the 1968–69 season; all four games ended in defeat for Burnley, including a 0–7 defeat to Manchester City and a 1–6 loss away at Leeds United. Wrigley scored his first goal for the club in the 4–2 win against Crystal Palace on 11 October 1969. On 27 March 1970, he made his final appearance for Burnley in the 1–1 draw with Stoke City at Turf Moor. In September 1970, Wrigley left to go to University to study geology.
