= Peter Jones (footballer, born 1949) =

English footballer

Personal information
- Full name: Peter Alfred Jones
- Date of birth: 25 November 1949 (age 76)
- Place of birth: Ellesmere Port, England
- Position: Full back

Senior career*
Years	Team	Apps	(Gls)
1967–1971	Burnley	2	(0)
1971–1974	Swansea City	81	(1)
- * Club domestic league appearances and goals

Peter Alfred Jones (born 25 November 1949) is an English former professional footballer who played as a full back. He played in the Football League for Burnley and Swansea City. He also represented England at youth level.
