= George Sommerville =

Scottish footballer

Personal information
- Full name: George Douglas Liddell Sommerville
- Date of birth: 21 December 1900
- Place of birth: Motherwell, Scotland
- Date of death: 1984 (aged 84)
- Place of death: Bristol, England
- Height: 5 ft 10 in (1.78 m)
- Position: Goalkeeper

Senior career*
Years	Team	Apps	(Gls)
- Strathclyde
1921–1926	Hamilton Academical	138	(0)
1926–1932	Burnley	118	(0)
1932–1934	Bristol City	34	(0)
- Burton Town
- Yeovil & Petters United
- * Club domestic league appearances and goals

George Douglas Liddell Sommerville (21 December 1900 – 1984) was a Scottish professional footballer who played as a goalkeeper.

He worked as an aircraft inspector during the Second World War. His sister Isa married John Steel, a teammate at Hamilton and Burnley.
