= Walter Place (footballer, born 1869) =

English footballer

Personal information
- Full name: Walter Place
- Date of birth: 1869
- Place of birth: Burnley, England
- Date of death: Unknown
- Position: Wing half

Senior career*
Years	Team	Apps	(Gls)
	Burnley	?	(?)
	Colne	?	(?)
	Bacup	?	(?)
1890–1900	Burnley	136	(7)
- * Club domestic league appearances and goals

Walter Place (born 1869, deceased) was an English professional footballer who played as a wing half.

Place also competed as a pigeon shooter.
