= Des Lancaster =

English footballer

Personal information
- Full name: Desmond Charles Lancaster
- Date of birth: 16 July 1937
- Place of birth: Burnley, England
- Date of death: October 2000 (age 63)
- Place of death: Burnley, England
- Position: Striker

Senior career*
Years	Team	Apps	(Gls)
1954–1958	Burnley	1	(0)
1958–1959	Darlington	31	(18)
1959–1960	Tranmere Rovers	1	(0)
	Nelson	?	(?)
- * Club domestic league appearances and goals

Desmond Charles Lancaster (16 July 1937 – October 2000) was an English professional footballer who played as a striker.
