= Jimmy Scott (footballer, born 1934) =

English footballer

Personal information
- Full name: James Scott
- Date of birth: 7 September 1934 (age 92)
- Place of birth: Hetton-le-Hole, England
- Position: Wing half

Senior career*
Years	Team	Apps	(Gls)
1951–1961	Burnley	3	(0)
1961–1964	Oldham Athletic	76	(0)
- * Club domestic league appearances and goals

James Scott (born 7 September 1934) is an English retired professional footballer who played as a wing half.
