= Micky Finn (footballer) =

English footballer

Personal information
- Full name: Michael Gerard Finn
- Date of birth: 1 May 1954 (age 72)
- Place of birth: Liverpool, England
- Position: Goalkeeper

Senior career*
Years	Team	Apps	(Gls)
1973–1975	Burnley	4	(0)
	Accrington Stanley	222	(0)

Managerial career
- 1982: Accrington Stanley
- * Club domestic league appearances and goals

Michael Gerard Finn (born 1 May 1954) is an English former professional association footballer who played as a goalkeeper.
