= Cuthbert Storey =

English footballer

Personal information
- Date of birth: 1878
- Place of birth: Burnley, England
- Position: Inside forward

Senior career*
Years	Team	Apps	(Gls)
1902–1903	Burnley	4	(1)
- * Club domestic league appearances and goals

Cuthbert Storey (born 1878) was an English professional footballer who played as an inside forward. He played four matches in the Football League for Burnley in the 1902–03 season, and scored one goal.
