= Luca Scanlon =

Gibraltarian footballer (born 2009)

Personal information
- Full name: Luca Robert Scanlon
- Date of birth: 13 July 2009 (age 17)
- Place of birth: Leicester, England
- Height: 1.80 m (5 ft 11 in)
- Position: Attacking midfielder

Team information
- Current team: Burnley
- Number: 74

Youth career
- 2019–2021: Nottingham Forest
- 2021–2025: Manchester United
- 2025–: Burnley

Senior career*
| Years | Team | Apps | (Gls) |
| 2026– | Burnley | 0 | (0) |

International career^{‡}
| 2021–2022 | Gibraltar U15 | 2 | (2) |
| 2022–2023 | Gibraltar U16 | 3 | (2) |
| 2024– | Gibraltar U17 | 3 | (0) |
| 2025– | Gibraltar U21 | 4 | (0) |
| 2025– | Gibraltar | 4 | (0) |
- * Club domestic league appearances and goals as of 29 April 2025 ‡ National team caps and goals as of 6 June 2026

Luca Robert Scanlon (born 13 July 2009) is a professional footballer who plays as a attacking Midfield for EFL Championship club Burnley. Born in England, he plays for the Gibraltar national team.

He is left-footed and plays on the right wing.

== Club career ==
Scanlon began his youth career with Nottingham Forest, before moving to Manchester United in 2021 after his brother James signed for the Red Devils. In March 2025, he left the club and joined the academy of Burnley. He made his under-21s debut for the Clarets that same season in the Lancashire Senior Cup final.

== International career ==
Eligible for England and Gibraltar, Scanlon was first called up to the Gibraltar senior team in September 2025 for the 2026 FIFA World Cup qualifier against Faroe Islands. He made his debut, at the age of 16 years and 57 days, as a substitute during the game, replacing his brother James in the 82nd minute. In an interview with The Guardian he stated that he had originally planned to travel to the game to support his brother but was invited to train with the squad by head coach Scott Wiseman, who subsequently promoted him to the senior squad. As of October 2026, he is the youngest player to have appeared in the UEFA Nations League, having made his first appearance at 16 years and 261 days old.

== Personal life ==
Scanlon's mother Gabriella (née Falero) is a former athlete who jointly holds the Gibraltarian record for the women's 4 × 100 m relay, and met her husband while studying at Loughborough University. His father Rob was a British Universities and Colleges Sport champion in the 1500 metres. His older brother, James, is current in the youth system at Arsenal, and has also represented Gibraltar at international level.

== Career statistics ==
=== International ===
As of 6 June 2026

Gibraltar
| Year | Apps | Goals |
| 2025 | 1 | 0 |
| 2026 | 3 | 0 |
| Total | 4 | 0 |
