= Harold Spencer (footballer) =

English footballer

Personal information
- Full name: Harold John Spencer
- Date of birth: 30 April 1919
- Place of birth: Burnley, England
- Date of death: 2003 (aged 83 or 84)
- Position: Wing half

Senior career*
Years	Team	Apps	(Gls)
1937–1950	Burnley	4	(1)
1950–1951	Wrexham	11	(0)
Total		15	(1)
- * Club domestic league appearances and goals

Harold John Spencer (30 April 1919 – 1999) was an English professional footballer who played as a wing half. He started his career at Burnley, and turned professional in 1937. However, he had to wait until the 1946–47 season, in order to make his debut for the Clarets, which came at a 1–1 draw with Coventry City on 31 August 1946. He went on to play a total of four league games for Burnley before moving to Wrexham in July 1950. He spent just one season in Wales and made eleven league appearances for the club.
