= Billy Morris (footballer, born 1918) =

Welsh footballer (1918–2002)

Personal information
- Full name: William Morris
- Date of birth: 30 July 1918
- Place of birth: Llanddulas, Wales
- Date of death: 31 December 2002 (aged 84)
- Place of death: Bodelwyddan, Wales
- Position: Inside forward

Senior career*
Years	Team	Apps	(Gls)
- Llandudno Town
1939–1953	Burnley	211	(47)

International career
1947–1952	Wales	5	(0)

Managerial career
- 1960–1961: Wrexham
- 1965: Wrexham
- * Club domestic league appearances and goals

William Morris (30 July 1918 – 31 December 2002) was a Welsh international footballer who played as an inside forward. He was part of the Burnley side which lost 0–1 to Charlton Athletic in the 1947 FA Cup Final. Between 1947 and 1952, Morris won a total of five caps for the Wales national football team.

After he retired from playing, Morris had two spells as manager of Wrexham and a stint as coach with Colwyn Bay. He and his wife had one son, Gareth Morris, and also spent some years running a guest house in Llandudno and local shop in Llysfaen. His nephew is former Wrexham and Chester City forward Elfed Morris

== International caps ==
Wales score first

Date	Venue	Opponent	Result	Competition
16 April 1947	Windsor Park, Belfast	Ireland	1–2	Home International
10 November 1948	Villa Park, Birmingham	England	0–1	Home International
14 November 1951	Hampden Park, Glasgow	Wales	1–0	Home International
5 December 1951	Ninian Park, Cardiff	United Kingdom	3–2	Friendly match
19 March 1952	Vetch Field, Swansea	Northern Ireland	3–0	Home International

== Honours ==
Burnley

- FA Cup runner-up: 1946–47
