= Jack Butterfield (footballer) =

English footballer

Personal information
- Full name: John Butterfield
- Date of birth: 30 August 1922
- Place of birth: Barnsley, England
- Date of death: March 2001 (aged 78)
- Place of death: Burnley, England
- Position: Defender

Senior career*
Years	Team	Apps	(Gls)
- Tamworth
1947–1948	Burnley	3	(0)
- * Club domestic league appearances and goals

John Butterfield (30 August 1922 – March 2001) was an English professional footballer who played as a defender. He made three appearances in the Football League in the 1947–1948 season before being forced to retire due to an injury. He later became a commercial director at Burnley and Sunderland.
