= Freddy Taylor (footballer) =

English footballer

Personal information
- Full name: Frederick Taylor
- Date of birth: 24 February 1920
- Place of birth: Burnley, England
- Date of death: 1983 (aged 62 or 63)
- Position: Winger

Senior career*
Years	Team	Apps	(Gls)
1937–1948	Burnley	49	(7)
1948–1950	New Brighton	55	(10)
Total		104	(17)
- * Club domestic league appearances and goals

Frederick Taylor (24 February 1920 – 1983) was an English professional footballer who played as a winger. He played more than 100 matches in the Football League for Burnley and New Brighton before being forced to retire through injury in 1950.
