= Len Martindale =

English footballer

Personal information
- Full name: Leonard Martindale
- Date of birth: 30 June 1920
- Place of birth: Bolton, England
- Date of death: 9 October 1971 (aged 51)
- Place of death: Chorley, England
- Position: Wing half

Senior career*
Years	Team	Apps	(Gls)
	Rossendale United	?	(?)
1937–1951	Burnley	69	(2)
1951–1952	Accrington Stanley	16	(0)
- * Club domestic league appearances and goals

Leonard Martindale (30 June 1920 – 9 October 1971) was an English-born association footballer who played as a wing half in the Football League either side of World War II.

He made 69 League appearances for Burnley, before transferring to Accrington Stanley in 1951-52.
