= Bill Morris (footballer, born 1913) =

English footballer

Personal information
- Full name: William Walter Morris
- Date of birth: 26 March 1913
- Place of birth: Handsworth, England
- Date of death: 1995 (age 82)
- Place of death: Adelaide, Australia
- Position: Defender

Youth career
- Handsworth Old Boys

Senior career*
| Years | Team | Apps | (Gls) |
| | West Bromwich Albion | 0 | (0) |
- Halesowen Town
| 1933–1947 | Wolverhampton Wanderers | 175 | (2) |
| 1947–1949 | Dudley Town | | |

International career
| 1938–1939 | England | 3 | (0) |
- * Club domestic league appearances and goals

William Walter Morris (26 March 1913 – 1995) was an English footballer who spent the majority of his playing career at Wolverhampton Wanderers.

Morris began his senior career in the colts side of West Bromwich Albion, before moving to Halesowen Town. He was signed by Wolverhampton Wanderers in May 1933 for £100, and made his debut for the club against former team West Bromwich Albion on 17 February 1934, playing as an emergency centre-forward.

He remained a back-up player until the 1935–36 season when he became a first choice centre-half for the Midlanders. A disappointing start to the next campaign saw him switched to right-back, which would remain his position for the rest of his Molineux career.

He played in the 1939 FA Cup Final, where Wolves were surprisingly beaten by Portsmouth, and won three England caps. His international debut came on 16 November 1939 in a 7–0 victory over Northern Ireland at Old Trafford.

The outbreak of World War II meant the suspension of league football, but Morris turned out 67 times for Wolves in regional games, and also guested for Wrexham. At the resumption of league action in 1946, Morris soon found himself out of the team, and at the end of the 1946–47 season he left Wolves.

He joined nearby Dudley Town, where he played two further seasons as a centre-forward before retiring in May 1949.

He died in 1995, aged 82.

== Honours ==
Wolverhampton Wanderers

- FA Cup runner-up: 1938–39
