= Reg Kirkham =

English footballer

Reginald Kirkham (8 May 1919 – 1999) was an English footballer who played as full back for Burnley Football Club between 1947 and 1951. He played 15 games for Burnley and played in the Central League championship side of 1949. He scored one goal for Burnley at Turf Moor against Portsmouth in 1950.

Reg Kirkam joined Everton F.C. as an amateur in 1938, signing professional terms with Wolverhampton Wanderers the next season. After the war, he returned to Wolves before moving to Burnley.

He helped to form the Ex-Clarets' Association.

His senior career ended when he sustained a double fracture of the leg whilst on tour in Turkey. He played briefly for Rossendale before finally retiring.
