= George Knight (footballer, born 1921) =

English footballer (1921–2011)

Personal information
- Full name: George Rollinson Knight
- Date of birth: 12 May 1921
- Place of birth: Bolton, England
- Date of death: 24 August 2011 (aged 90)
- Place of death: Birmingham, England
- Position: Inside forward

Senior career*
Years	Team	Apps	(Gls)
- Holdens Temperance
1938–1947	Burnley	9	(2)
- * Club domestic league appearances and goals

George Knight (12 May 1921 – 24 August 2011) was an English professional footballer who played as an inside forward.

Despite being on the books at Burnley for nine years, he played just nine league games as his career was interrupted by the Second World War.

George played for Burnley's first team at the age of 17 but wartime and a knee injury cut his career short.

He died on 24 August 2011 at the age of 90, by which time he was Burnley's oldest surviving former player.
