= Harold Rudman =

English footballer

Personal information
- Full name: Harold Rudman
- Date of birth: 4 November 1924
- Place of birth: Whitworth, England
- Date of death: 4 October 2013 (aged 88)
- Place of death: Rochdale, England
- Position: Full back

Senior career*
Years	Team	Apps	(Gls)
1942–1957	Burnley	71	(0)
1957–1958	Rochdale	21	(2)
- * Club domestic league appearances and goals

Harold Rudman (4 November 1924 – 4 October 2013) was an English professional footballer who played as a full back.
