= Ray Harrison =

English footballer (1921–2000)

Personal information
- Full name: Raymond William Harrison
- Date of birth: 21 June 1921
- Place of birth: Boston, England
- Date of death: June 2000 (aged 78–79)
- Place of death: Doncaster, England
- Position: Centre forward

Youth career
- Boston United

Senior career*
Years	Team	Apps	(Gls)
1946–1950	Burnley	60	(19)
1950–1954	Doncaster Rovers	126	(47)
1954–1955	Grimsby Town	38	(7)
1955–1957	King's Lynn		
1957–19??	Frickley Colliery		
- * Club domestic league appearances and goals

Raymond William Harrison (21 June 1921 – June 2000) was an English professional association footballer who played as a centre forward in the Football League for Burnley, Doncaster Rovers and Grimsby Town. Harrison is best remembered for scoring the winning goal for Burnley in an FA Cup semi-final.

In his later career he managed Frickley Colliery in the Midland League and ran a sports shop in Doncaster.

== Honours ==
Burnley

- FA Cup runner-up: 1946–47
