= Jack Hays =

Spanish footballer

Personal information
- Full name: Christopher John Hays
- Date of birth: 12 December 1918
- Place of birth: Ashington, England
- Date of death: 23 February 1983 (aged 64)
- Place of death: Gazeley, England
- Position: Winger

Senior career*
Years	Team	Apps	(Gls)
1938–1939	Bradford Park Avenue	17	(0)
1939–1951	Burnley	146	(12)
1951–1953	Bury	27	(2)
- * Club domestic league appearances and goals

Christopher John Hays (12 December 1918 – 23 February 1983) was an English association footballer who played as a winger.
