= Jonathan Cretney =

English footballer

Jack Cretney
Personal information
- Full name: John Thomas Cretney
- Date of birth: 1879
- Place of birth: Harrington, Cumberland, England
- Date of death: 1956 (aged 76–77)
- Place of death: Alabama, United States
- Position: Wing half

Senior career*
Years	Team	Apps	(Gls)
1904–1905	Newcastle United	0	(0)
1905–1911	Burnley	167	(7)
1911–1912	Gainsborough Trinity	5	(0)
Total		172	(7)
- * Club domestic league appearances and goals

John Thomas Cretney (1879 – 1956) was an English professional footballer who played as a wing half.
