= Jackie Knight =

English footballer

Personal information
- Full name: John Knight
- Date of birth: 12 September 1922
- Place of birth: Bolton, England
- Date of death: 28 January 1996 (aged 73)
- Place of death: Bath, England
- Position: Inside forward

Senior career*
Years	Team	Apps	(Gls)
1945–1948	Burnley	26	(5)
1948–1951	Preston North End	39	(7)
1951–1952	Chesterfield	35	(6)
1952–1954	Exeter City	56	(6)
1954-1955	Bath City		
1955-1958	Salisbury		(11)
1958-	Frome		
- * Club domestic league appearances and goals

John Knight (12 September 1922 – 28 January 1996) was an English professional footballer who played as an inside forward. He played in the Football League for Burnley, Preston North End, Chesterfield and Exeter City, before moving into non-league football with Bath City, Salisbury and Frome Town.
