= Ron Hornby =

English footballer

Personal information
- Full name: Ronald Hornby
- Date of birth: 13 April 1914
- Place of birth: Rochdale, England
- Date of death: 13 July 1962 (aged 48)
- Height: 5 ft 6 in (1.68 m)
- Position: Inside left

Senior career*
Years	Team	Apps	(Gls)
- Rochdale St Clements
1931–1932	Rochdale	2	(0)
1933	Oldham Athletic	0	(0)
1933–1934	Stalybridge Celtic	0	(0)
1934–????	Burnley	123	(16)
1942	→ Rochdale (guest)	1	(0)
- * Club domestic league appearances and goals

Ronald Hornby (13 April 1914 – 13 July 1962) was a professional footballer who played for Stalybridge Celtic, Rochdale and Burnley.
