= George Strong (footballer) =

English footballer

Personal information
- Full name: George James Strong
- Date of birth: 7 June 1916
- Place of birth: Morpeth, England
- Date of death: 11 October 1989 (aged 73)
- Place of death: Burnley, England
- Position: Goalkeeper

Senior career*
Years	Team	Apps	(Gls)
1934	Hartlepools United	1	(0)
1934–1935	Chesterfield	18	(0)
1935–1938	Portsmouth	59	(0)
1938–1939	Gillingham	20	(0)
1939–1946	Walsall	0	(0)
1946–1953	Burnley	264	(0)
Total		362	(0)
- * Club domestic league appearances and goals

George James Strong (7 June 1916 – 11 October 1989) was an English professional footballer who played as a goalkeeper. He played in the Football League for a number of clubs, making over 350 appearances in total.

== Honours ==
Burnley

- FA Cup runner-up: 1946–47
