= Jackie Chew =

English footballer

John Chew
Personal information
- Date of birth: 13 May 1920
- Place of birth: Blackburn, England
- Date of death: 21 October 2002 (aged 82)
- Position: Winger

Senior career*
Years	Team	Apps	(Gls)
1946–1954	Burnley	225	(39)
1954–1955	Bradford City	36	(4)
Total		461	(43)
- * Club domestic league appearances and goals

John Chew (13 May 1920 – 21 October 2002) was a footballer who played for Burnley, Bradford City and Darwen. He made more than 200 league appearances for Burnley side, scoring more than 40 goals. He played just one season with Bradford City, scoring four goals from 36 games. He was born in Blackburn. Jack, as he was known, was also a very good cricketer, and an opening batsman for Rishton Cricket Club in the Lancashire League, his, then, home town. At that time, the Lancashire League had the only professional players in the world; each club being permitted one paid professional. In his cricketing career, Jack faced some of the greatest bowlers in the world, from Australia (Ritchie Benaud), South Africa, and the West Indies (Charlie Griffith, Wes Hall).

== Honours ==
Burnley

- FA Cup runner-up: 1946–47
