= Peter Kippax (footballer) =

English footballer

Personal information
- Full name: Frederick Peter Kippax
- Date of birth: 17 July 1922
- Place of birth: Burnley, England
- Date of death: 21 September 1987 (aged 65)
- Place of death: Lytham St Annes, England
- Position: Left winger

Senior career*
Years	Team	Apps	(Gls)
1946–1948	Burnley	32	(6)
1948–1950	Liverpool	1	(0)
1950	Preston North End		

International career
1948	Great Britain	3	(0)
- * Club domestic league appearances and goals

Frederick Peter Kippax (17 July 1922 – 21 September 1987) was an English amateur footballer who played as a left winger.

== Career ==
=== Club career ===
Having made wartime guest appearances for Charlton Athletic, Grimsby Town, Manchester United, West Ham United, Fulham, Liverpool, Hearts, and Hibernian during World War II, Kippax started his career in the Football League with Burnley, before moving to Liverpool in January 1949.

Kippax made his Liverpool debut in a 1–0 win over Birmingham City on 12 March 1949; this was to be his only appearance for the club, before joining Preston North End in 1950.

He later played for Yorkshire Amateur until 1956.

=== International career ===
Kippax represented Great Britain at the 1948 Summer Olympics, featuring three times as the British side finished fourth.

== Honours ==
Burnley

- FA Cup runner-up: 1946–47
