= Arthur Woodruff =

English footballer

Personal information
- Full name: Arthur Woodruff
- Date of birth: 12 April 1913
- Place of birth: Barnsley, England
- Date of death: 5 January 1983 (aged 69)
- Place of death: Burnley, England
- Height: 5 ft 10 in (1.78 m)
- Position: Right back

Senior career*
| Years | Team | Apps | (Gls) |
| 1934–1936 | Bradford City | 0 | (0) |
| 1936–1952 | Burnley | 271 | (0) |
| 1952–1953 | Workington | 11 | (0) |
| Total | | 282 | (0) |

Managerial career
- 1953–1954: Northwich Victoria
- * Club domestic league appearances and goals

Arthur Woodruff (12 April 1913 – 5 January 1983) was an English professional footballer who played as a centre-half.

== Honours ==
Burnley

- FA Cup runner-up: 1946–47
