= Cliff Britton =

English footballer (1909–1975)

Personal information
- Full name: Clifford Samuel Britton
- Date of birth: 29 August 1909
- Place of birth: Hanham, England
- Date of death: 1 December 1975 (aged 66)
- Place of death: Anlaby, England
- Height: 5 ft 10 1/2 in (1.79 m)
- Position: Wing half

Senior career*
Years	Team	Apps	(Gls)
- Hanham Athletic
- Hanham United Methodists
- Jennings Ltd
- Bristol St. George
1928–1930	Bristol Rovers	50	(1)
1930–1939	Everton	221	(2)

International career
1934–1937	England	9	(1)

Managerial career
- 1945–1948: Burnley
- 1948–1956: Everton
- 1956–1961: Preston North End
- 1961–1969: Hull City
- * Club domestic league appearances and goals

Clifford Samuel Britton (29 August 1909 – 1 December 1975) was an English football player and manager.

== Playing career ==
After playing amateur football for a number of teams in the Bristol area, his professional playing career began when he signed for Bristol Rovers in 1928. He made over 50 appearances for Rovers, where he was a teammate of his brother Frank Britton. Britton was signed by Everton in 1930. At first he was deemed too frail and so he was playing in the reserves in the 1931–32 Championship season, but he was one of the stars of Everton's 1933 FA Cup win. He was one of the classiest playmakers of his era, who could produce miracles with short or long passes. Dixie Dean said that he was the best crosser of the ball that he played with. Dean joked that Britton's precision ensured that the laces on the ball were turned away when Dean had to head it. Britton made 242 appearances for Everton though only scoring three goals. Between 1934 and 1937 Britton also played nine times for England.

== Management career ==
=== Burnley & Everton ===
After the war, Britton was made manager of Burnley in October 1945. He quickly steered Burnley to promotion from the Second Division in the 1946–47 season and to the 1947 FA Cup Final. Britton's tactics became known as the "clockwork method". It aimed to get all players behind the ball when Burnley lost possession, before using short passing to attack after regaining it. This resulted in relatively few goals being both conceded and scored. Burnley finished third the top flight in 1947–48. Britton was appointed manager of Everton during the 1948 off-season and was regarded as a big improvement over the previous manager Theo Kelly.

Unlike his predecessor Britton was an ex-player and was said to have easy-going approachability so confidence improved. Britton was also a disciplinarian and it was said that his ideal team would be eleven 'teetotallers'. However the Everton squad was of low quality and suffered eleven consecutive defeats in September to November of the 1950–51 season. In a desperate foray into the transfer market, Britton spent £28,000 on an uninspiring inside forward, Harry Potts from Burnley when a new centre forward was desperately needed. (He could have brought Tommy Lawton back for less money). In 1950–51 Everton were two points clear of the relegation zone but contrived to suffer a 6–0 defeat to Sheffield Wednesday, while Chelsea beat Bolton Wanderers 4–0 and so Everton were relegated on goal average.

With remarkable patience the Everton board gave Britton a vote of confidence. However, in the summer of 1951, the board refused any more money for transfer fees and so Britton had to rely heavily on a policy of youth rather than on big money buys. Consequently, Everton spent three seasons in the Second Division finishing 7th and a worrying 16th before being promoted as runners-up in 1953–54.

The board continued to refuse transfer funds and Britton had disagreements with them. While Britton was abroad with the team the board wanted to appoint an acting manager. The board had also interfered with other decisions, but Britton had also made several mistakes such as dropping and then selling the talismanic Dave Hickson. Eventually Britton resigned from Everton in 1956 saying that "I want all managers to have the freedom to do the job for which they were appointed." A sub-committee of the board unsuccessfully ran the Everton team for the remainder of the season until Ian Buchan was appointed.

=== Preston North End ===
After a six-month gap Britton became manager of Preston North End. In the next five years, Preston North End flirted with winning the League championship and Britton laid the foundations of a solid youth policy. Britton took the decision that would cause Tom Finney to play some of the best football of his life. At the age of 34, Finney was made centre-forward, where he was also to play three games for England. Finney was a revelation, scoring 23 goals the 1956–57 season and Preston finished third in the First Division. The next season they went one better – runners-up to Champions Wolves. However Preston North End were relegated after the 1960–61 season and so Britton resigned.

=== Hull City ===
In 1961 he became manager of Hull City. Again he relied on youth rather than the transfer market until an injection of cash in 1964 allowed him to bring in new players such as Ken Wagstaff. Consequently, Hull eventually won the Third Division championship in the 1965–66 season. He continued to trust the same group of players instead of bringing in new talent and so Hull's challenge for promotion to the First Division faltered. He became general manager of Hull City in 1970 and was instrumental in the recruitment of Terry Neill as his successor.

== Managerial statistics ==
All competitive league games (league and domestic cup) and international matches (including friendlies) are included.

Team	Year	Record				
Team	Year	G	W	D	L	Win %
Burnley	1945–1948	107	52	31	24	48.6
Everton	1948–1956	344	125	92	127	36.3
Preston North End	1956–1961	231	102	54	75	44.2
Hull City	1961–1969	419	172	105	142	41.1
Total		1,094	448	281	365	41.0

== Honours ==
=== As a player ===
Everton

- FA Cup: 1932–33

=== As a manager ===
Hull City

- Football League Third Division: 1965–66
