= Harry Mather =

English footballer and manager

Personal information
- Full name: Harold Mather
- Date of birth: 24 January 1921
- Place of birth: Bolton, England
- Date of death: 1 March 1999 (aged 78)
- Place of death: Burnley, England
- Position: Full back

Senior career*
Years	Team	Apps	(Gls)
1938–1955	Burnley	301	(0)
1955	Nelson	?	(?)
1955–1956	Hull City (player-coach)	0	(0)
1956–1957	Ballymena United		

Managerial career
- 1957–1958: Kettering Town
- 1962–1963: Accrington Stanley
- 1964: Nelson
- * Club domestic league appearances and goals

Harold Mather (24 January 1921 – 1 March 1999) was an English professional footballer who played as a full back.

== Honours ==
Burnley

- FA Cup runner-up: 1946–47
