= 1946–47 FA Cup =

Tournament details
- Country: England; Wales

Final positions
- Champions: Charlton Athletic (1st title)
- Runners-up: Burnley

The 1946–47 FA Cup was the 66th season of the world's oldest football cup competition, the Football Association Challenge Cup, commonly known as the FA Cup. Charlton Athletic, the previous season's runners-up, won the competition for the first time, beating Burnley 1–0 after extra time in the final at Wembley.

Matches were scheduled to be played at the stadium of the team named first on the date specified for each round, which was always a Saturday. Some matches, however, might be rescheduled for other days if there were clashes with games for other competitions or the weather was inclement. If scores were level after 90 minutes had been played, a replay would take place at the stadium of the second-named team later the same week. If the replayed match was drawn further replays would be held until a winner was determined. If scores were level after 90 minutes had been played in a replay, a 30-minute period of extra time would be played.

== Calendar ==
Round	Date
Extra preliminary round	Saturday 7 September 1946
Preliminary round	Saturday 21 September 1946
First round qualifying	Saturday 5 October 1946
Second round qualifying	Saturday 19 October 1946
Third round qualifying	Saturday 2 November 1946
Fourth round qualifying	Saturday 16 November 1946
First round proper	Saturday 30 November 1946
Second round proper	Saturday 14 December 1946
Third round proper	Saturday 11 January 1947
Fourth round proper	Saturday 25 January 1947
Fifth round proper	Saturday 8 February 1947
Sixth round proper	Saturday 1 March 1947
Semi-finals	Saturday 29 March 1947
Final	Saturday 26 April 1947

== Qualifying rounds ==
Most participating clubs that were not members of the Football League competed in the qualifying rounds to secure one of 25 places available in the first round.

The 25 winners from the fourth qualifying round were North Shields, Spennymoor United, Stockton, Workington, Lancaster City, Marine, Runcorn, South Liverpool, Cheltenham Town, Scunthorpe & Lindsey United, Gainsborough Trinity, Wellington Town, Brush Sports, Peterborough United, Colchester United, Cambridge Town, Leytonstone, Finchley, Hayes, Sutton United, Gravesend & Northfleet, Gillingham, Poole Town, Merthyr Tydfil and Yeovil Town.

Those advancing to the competition proper for the first time were Cambridge Town, Leytonstone, Loughborough-based works outfit Brush Sports, the recently reconstituted Merthyr Tydfil and the recently merged Gravesend & Northfleet. Additionally, Poole Town had not featured at this stage since 1928–29 and Finchley had not done so since 1881-82.

Finchley was also the only club to progress from the extra preliminary round to the competition proper, defeating Polytechnic, Hendon, Wood Green Town, Hoddesdon Town, Harrow Town and Eastbourne Town before losing to Port Vale at the Old Recreation Ground.

== First round proper ==
At this stage 41 clubs from the Football League Third Division North and South joined the 25 non-league clubs that came through the qualifying rounds. Chester, Cardiff City and Crystal Palace were given byes to the third round. To make the number of matches up, non-league sides Barnet and Bishop Auckland, the previous season's FA Amateur Cup winners and runners-up, were given byes to this round.

34 matches were played on Saturday, 30 November 1946. Six were drawn and went to replays in the following midweek fixture.

Tie no	Home team	Score	Away team	Date
1	Bournemouth & Boscombe Athletic	4–2	Exeter City	30 November 1946
2	Barnet	3–0	Sutton United	30 November 1946
3	Barrow	0–0	Halifax Town	30 November 1946
Replay	Halifax Town	1–0	Barrow	4 December 1946
4	Bristol City	9–3	Hayes	30 November 1946
5	Rochdale	6–1	Bishop Auckland	30 November 1946
6	Yeovil Town	2–2	Peterborough United	30 November 1946
Replay	Peterborough United	1–0	Yeovil Town	5 December 1946
7	Reading	5–0	Colchester United	30 November 1946
8	Gillingham	4–1	Gravesend & Northfleet	30 November 1946
9	Gainsborough Trinity	1–2	Darlington	30 November 1946
10	Swindon Town	4–1	Cambridge Town	30 November 1946
11	Stockton	2–4	Lincoln City	30 November 1946
12	Doncaster Rovers	2–2	Accrington Stanley	30 November 1946
Replay	Accrington Stanley	0–5	Doncaster Rovers	4 December 1946
13	Wrexham	5–0	Marine	30 November 1946
14	Ipswich Town	2–0	Torquay United	30 November 1946
15	Stockport County	2–0	Southport	30 November 1946
16	Wellington Town	1–1	Watford	30 November 1946
Replay	Watford	1–0	Wellington Town	4 December 1946
17	Queens Park Rangers	2–2	Poole Town	30 November 1946
Replay	Poole Town	0–6	Queens Park Rangers	4 December 1946
18	Leytonstone	1–6	Walsall	30 November 1946
19	Northampton Town	2–0	Mansfield Town	30 November 1946
20	South Liverpool	2–1	Workington	30 November 1946
21	Norwich City	7–2	Brighton & Hove Albion	30 November 1946
22	Hull City	0–0	New Brighton	30 November 1946
Replay	New Brighton	1–2	Hull City	4 December 1946
23	Carlisle United	4–0	Runcorn	30 November 1946
24	Oldham Athletic	1–0	Tranmere Rovers	30 November 1946
25	Hartlepools United	6–0	North Shields	30 November 1946
26	Port Vale	5–0	Finchley	30 November 1946
27	York City	0–1	Scunthorpe & Lindsey United	30 November 1946
28	Rotherham United	2–0	Crewe Alexandra	30 November 1946
29	Aldershot	4–2	Cheltenham Town	30 November 1946
30	Gateshead	3–1	Bradford City	30 November 1946
31	Lancaster City	1–0	Spennymoor United	30 November 1946
32	Leyton Orient	1–2	Notts County	30 November 1946
33	Brush Sports	1–6	Southend United	30 November 1946
34	Merthyr Tydfil	3–1	Bristol Rovers	30 November 1946

== Second round proper ==
The matches were played on Saturday, 14 December 1946. Six matches were drawn, with replays taking place in the following midweek fixture. Two of these then went to a second replay.

Tie no	Home team	Score	Away team	Date
1	Darlington	1–2	Hull City	14 December 1946
2	Bournemouth & Boscombe Athletic	4–2	Aldershot	14 December 1946
3	Barnet	2–9	Southend United	14 December 1946
4	Bristol City	1–2	Gillingham	14 December 1946
5	Rochdale	6–1	Hartlepools United	14 December 1946
6	Watford	1–1	Port Vale	14 December 1946
Replay	Port Vale	2–1	Watford	16 December 1946
7	Walsall	0–0	Ipswich Town	14 December 1946
Replay	Ipswich Town	0–1	Walsall	18 December 1946
8	Notts County	2–1	Swindon Town	14 December 1946
9	Lincoln City	1–1	Wrexham	14 December 1946
Replay	Wrexham	3–3	Lincoln City	18 December 1946
Replay	Lincoln City	2–1	Wrexham	23 December 1946
10	South Liverpool	2–3	Carlisle United	14 December 1946
11	Norwich City	4–4	Queens Park Rangers	14 December 1946
Replay	Queens Park Rangers	2–0	Norwich City	18 December 1946
12	Oldham Athletic	1–2	Doncaster Rovers	14 December 1946
13	Halifax Town	1–1	Stockport County	14 December 1946
Replay	Stockport County	2–1	Halifax Town	18 December 1946
14	Rotherham United	4–1	Scunthorpe & Lindsey United	14 December 1946
15	Gateshead	4–0	Lancaster City	14 December 1946
16	Peterborough United	1–1	Northampton Town	14 December 1946
Replay	Northampton Town	1–1	Peterborough United	19 December 1946
Replay	Northampton Town	8–1	Peterborough United	23 December 1946
17	Merthyr Tydfil	1–3	Reading	14 December 1946

== Third round proper ==
The 44 First and Second Division clubs entered the competition at this stage along with Chester, Cardiff City and Crystal Palace.

The matches were scheduled for Saturday, 11 January 1947. Five matches were drawn and went to replays, with one of these requiring a second replay to settle the fixture. Gillingham was the last non-league club left in the tournament.

Tie no	Home team	Score	Away team	Date
1	Chester	2–0	Plymouth Argyle	11 January 1947
2	Chesterfield	2–1	Sunderland	11 January 1947
3	Bournemouth & Boscombe Athletic	0–2	Derby County	11 January 1947
4	Burnley	5–1	Aston Villa	11 January 1947
5	Southampton	5–1	Bury	11 January 1947
6	Reading	2–2	Grimsby Town	11 January 1947
Replay	Grimsby Town	3–1	Reading	14 January 1947
7	Walsall	2–5	Liverpool	11 January 1947
8	Blackburn Rovers	1–1	Hull City	11 January 1947
Replay	Hull City	0–3	Blackburn Rovers	16 January 1947
9	Sheffield Wednesday	4–1	Blackpool	11 January 1947
10	Bolton Wanderers	5–1	Stockport County	11 January 1947
11	Wolverhampton Wanderers	3–0	Rotherham United	11 January 1947
12	West Bromwich Albion	2–1	Leeds United	11 January 1947
13	Lincoln City	0–1	Nottingham Forest	11 January 1947
14	Luton Town	6–0	Notts County	11 January 1947
15	Everton	4–2	Southend United	11 January 1947
16	Doncaster Rovers	2–3	Portsmouth	11 January 1947
17	Sheffield United	3–0	Carlisle United	11 January 1947
18	Newcastle United	6–2	Crystal Palace	11 January 1947
19	Tottenham Hotspur	2–2	Stoke City	11 January 1947
Replay	Stoke City	1–0	Tottenham Hotspur	15 January 1947
20	Manchester City	3–0	Gateshead	11 January 1947
21	Queens Park Rangers	1–1	Middlesbrough	11 January 1947
Replay	Middlesbrough	3–1	Queens Park Rangers	15 January 1947
22	Fulham	1–2	Birmingham City	11 January 1947
23	Brentford	1–0	Cardiff City	11 January 1947
24	Northampton Town	1–2	Preston North End	11 January 1947
25	Coventry City	5–2	Newport County	11 January 1947
26	West Ham United	1–2	Leicester City	11 January 1947
27	Millwall	0–3	Port Vale	11 January 1947
28	Chelsea	1–1	Arsenal	11 January 1947
Replay	Arsenal	1–1	Chelsea	15 January 1947
Replay	Arsenal	0–2	Chelsea	20 January 1947
29	Bradford Park Avenue	0–3	Manchester United	11 January 1947
30	Huddersfield Town	3–4	Barnsley	11 January 1947
31	Swansea Town	4–1	Gillingham	11 January 1947
32	Charlton Athletic	3–1	Rochdale	11 January 1947

== Fourth round proper ==
The matches were scheduled for Saturday, 25 January 1947. Five games were drawn and went to replays, of which one went to a second replay.

Tie no	Home team	Score	Away team	Date
1	Chester	0–0	Stoke City	25 January 1947
Replay	Stoke City	3–2	Chester	29 January 1947
2	Burnley	2–0	Coventry City	25 January 1947
3	Liverpool	2–0	Grimsby Town	25 January 1947
4	Preston North End	6–0	Barnsley	25 January 1947
5	Blackburn Rovers	2–0	Port Vale	25 January 1947
6	Sheffield Wednesday	2–1	Everton	25 January 1947
7	Bolton Wanderers	3–3	Manchester City	25 January 1947
Replay	Manchester City	1–0	Bolton Wanderers	29 January 1947
8	Wolverhampton Wanderers	0–0	Sheffield United	25 January 1947
Replay	Sheffield United	2–0	Wolverhampton Wanderers	29 January 1947
9	Middlesbrough	2–1	Chesterfield	25 January 1947
10	West Bromwich Albion	1–2	Charlton Athletic	25 January 1947
11	Luton Town	2–0	Swansea Town	25 January 1947
12	Newcastle United	3–1	Southampton	25 January 1947
13	Brentford	0–0	Leicester City	25 January 1947
Replay	Leicester City	0–0	Brentford	30 January 1947
Replay	Leicester City	4–1	Brentford	3 February 1947
14	Manchester United	0–2	Nottingham Forest	25 January 1947
15	Chelsea	2–2	Derby County	25 January 1947
Replay	Derby County	1–0	Chelsea	29 January 1947
16	Birmingham City	1–0	Portsmouth	25 January 1947

== Fifth round proper ==
The matches were scheduled for Saturday, 8 February 1947. There were three replays.

Tie no	Home team	Score	Away team	Date
1	Liverpool	1–0	Derby County	8 February 1947
2	Nottingham Forest	2–2	Middlesbrough	8 February 1947
Replay	Middlesbrough	6–2	Nottingham Forest	12 February 1947
3	Sheffield Wednesday	0–2	Preston North End	20 February 1947
4	Luton Town	0–0	Burnley	8 February 1947
Replay	Burnley	3–0	Luton Town	11 February 1947
5	Newcastle United	1–1	Leicester City	8 February 1947
Replay	Leicester City	1–2	Newcastle United	20 February 1947
6	Charlton Athletic	1–0	Blackburn Rovers	8 February 1947
7	Stoke City	0–1	Sheffield United	8 February 1947
8	Birmingham City	5–0	Manchester City	8 February 1947

== Sixth round proper ==
The four quarter-final ties were scheduled to be played on Saturday, 1 March 1947. There was one replay, in the Burnley–Middlesbrough match.

Tie no	Home team	Score	Away team	Date
1	Liverpool	4–1	Birmingham City	1 March 1947
2	Middlesbrough	1–1	Burnley	1 March 1947
Replay	Burnley	1–0	Middlesbrough	4 March 1947
3	Sheffield United	0–2	Newcastle United	1 March 1947
4	Charlton Athletic	2–1	Preston North End	1 March 1947

== Semi-finals ==
The semi-final matches were played on Saturday, 29 March 1947. Burnley and Liverpool needed to replay their match, which was settled two weeks later in Burnley's favour. They went on to meet Charlton Athletic in the final at Wembley.

29 March 1947
15:00

Burnley	0–0 (a.e.t.)	Liverpool

Ewood Park, Blackburn

Replay

12 April 1947
15:00

Burnley	1–0	Liverpool

Maine Road, Manchester

29 March 1947
15:00

Charlton Athletic	4–0	Newcastle United

Elland Road, Leeds

== Final ==
The 1947 FA Cup Final was contested by Charlton Athletic and Burnley at Wembley, England on 26 April 1947. Charlton, losing finalists the previous year, won by a single goal, scored in extra time by Chris Duffy. History repeated itself this year as the ball again burst during the game. Later, the reason for these problems in 1946 and 1947 was put down to the poor quality of leather available after World War II.

=== Match details ===
26 April 1947
15:00 BST

Charlton Athletic	1–0 (a.e.t.)	Burnley
Duffy 114'	(Report)

Wembley Stadium, London
Attendance: 98,215
Referee: J. M. Wiltshire

Charlton Athletic	Burnley

== See also ==
- FA Cup Final Results 1872-
