= 2003–04 Burnley F.C. season =

English football club season

Burnley
2003–04 season
- Chairman: Barry Kilby
- Manager: Stan Ternent
- First Division: 19th
- FA Cup: Fifth round
- League Cup: Third round
- Top goalscorer: League: Robbie Blake (19); All: Robbie Blake (22)
- Highest home attendance: 18,852 (vs. Sunderland, 9 May)
- Lowest home attendance: 9,473 (vs. Reading, 25 November)
- Average home league attendance: 12,541

The 2003–04 season was Burnley's fourth season in the second tier of English football. They were managed by Stan Ternent in his sixth full season since he replaced Chris Waddle at the beginning 1998–99 campaign.

== Season summary ==
Burnley struggled all season, and finished the season in 19th, two points above the relegation zone. As with the previous season, Burnley's defense was their downfall - the team conceded 77 goals, bettered in the First Division only by bottom club Wimbledon and in the entire Football League by Second Division side Notts County.

== Appearances and goals ==
| No. | Pos | Nat | Player | Total | | First Division | | League Cup | | FA Cup | |
| No. | Pos | Nat | Player | Apps | Goals | Apps | Goals | Apps | Goals | Apps | Goals |
|---|---|---|---|---|---|---|---|---|---|---|---|
| 1 | GK | (Denmark) DEN | Brian Jensen | 52 | 0 | 46 | 0 | 3 | 0 | 3 | 0 |
| 2 | DF | (England) ENG | Lee Roche | 30 | 1 | 21+4 | 1 | 1+1 | 0 | 3 | 0 |
| 3 | DF | (Guinea) GUI | Mo Camara | 51 | 0 | 45 | 0 | 3 | 0 | 2+1 | 0 |
| 4 | DF | (England) ENG | Paul Weller | 37 | 0 | 25+8 | 0 | 2 | 0 | 1+1 | 0 |
| 5 | DF | (England) ENG | David May | 39 | 4 | 34+1 | 4 | 1 | 0 | 3 | 0 |
| 6 | DF | (England) ENG | Graham Branch | 41 | 3 | 30+8 | 3 | 2 | 0 | 0+1 | 0 |
| 7 | MF | (England) ENG | Glen Little | 38 | 3 | 33+1 | 3 | 2 | 0 | 2 | 0 |
| 8 | FW | (England) ENG | Robbie Blake | 51 | 22 | 44+1 | 19 | 3 | 1 | 3 | 2 |
| 9 | FW | (Wales) WAL | Gareth Taylor | 0 | 0 | 0 | 0 | 0 | 0 | 0 | 0 |
| 9 | FW | (Nigeria) NGA | Dele Adebola (on loan) | 3 | 1 | 0+3 | 1 | 0 | 0 | 0 | 0 |
| 10 | FW | (England) ENG | Ian Moore | 45 | 13 | 38+2 | 9 | 2 | 1 | 3 | 3 |
| 11 | MF | (Republic of Ireland) IRL | Alan Moore | 17 | 0 | 5+8 | 0 | 1 | 0 | 1+2 | 0 |
| 12 | MF | (England) ENG | Tony Grant | 42 | 0 | 34+3 | 0 | 2 | 0 | 3 | 0 |
| 14 | DF | (England) ENG | Mark McGregor | 26 | 1 | 20+3 | 1 | 0 | 0 | 3 | 0 |
| 15 | DF | (England) ENG | Dean West | 35 | 1 | 25+7 | 1 | 2+1 | 0 | 0 | 0 |
| 16 | MF | (Republic of Ireland) IRL | Gareth Farrelly (on loan) | 14 | 0 | 9+3 | 0 | 1+1 | 0 | 0 | 0 |
| 16 | DF | (England) ENG | Jay McEveley (on loan) | 5 | 0 | 0+4 | 0 | 0 | 0 | 1 | 0 |
| 16 | MF | (England) ENG | Lenny Johnrose | 7 | 0 | 4+3 | 0 | 0 | 0 | 0 | 0 |
| 17 | DF | (Ivory Coast) CIV | Arthur Gnohéré | 16 | 1 | 12+2 | 1 | 2 | 0 | 0 | 0 |
| 18 | MF | (England) ENG | Luke Chadwick (on loan) | 40 | 6 | 23+13 | 5 | 2 | 1 | 1+1 | 0 |
| 19 | FW | (Grenada) GRN | Delroy Facey (on loan) | 16 | 5 | 12+2 | 5 | 2 | 0 | 0 | 0 |
| 19 | GK | (England) ENG | Nathan Abbey | 0 | 0 | 0 | 0 | 0 | 0 | 0 | 0 |
| 20 | MF | (England) ENG | Richard Chaplow | 44 | 5 | 30+9 | 5 | 1+1 | 0 | 3 | 0 |
| 21 | MF | (England) ENG | Matthew O'Neill | 4 | 0 | 0+4 | 0 | 0 | 0 | 0 | 0 |
| 22 | MF | (England) ENG | Joel Pilkington | 1 | 0 | 0+1 | 0 | 0+0 | 0 | 0+0 | 0 |
| 23 | DF | (England) ENG | Paul Scott | 2 | 0 | 0+2 | 0 | 0 | 0 | 0 | 0 |
| 24 | DF | (England) ENG | Andy Todd (on loan) | 8 | 0 | 7 | 0 | 1 | 0 | 0 | 0 |
| 24 | MF | (England) ENG | Bradley Orr (on loan) | 4 | 0 | 1+3 | 0 | 0 | 0 | 0 | 0 |
| 24 | DF | (Australia) AUS | Ryan Townsend | 1 | 0 | 0+1 | 0 | 0 | 0 | 0 | 0 |
| 25 | MF | (England) ENG | Neil Wood (on loan) | 11 | 1 | 8+2 | 1 | 0 | 0 | 1 | 0 |
| 26 | GK | (United States) USA | Paul Rachubka (on loan) | 0 | 0 | 0 | 0 | 0 | 0 | 0 | 0 |
| 26 | MF | (England) ENG | Marc Pugh | 0 | 0 | 0 | 0 | 0 | 0 | 0 | 0 |

== Transfers ==
=== In ===
| # | Pos | Player | From | Fee | Date |
|---|---|---|---|---|---|
| 3 | DF | (Guinea) Mo Camara | Wolverhampton Wanderers | Free | 23 May 2003 |
| 2 | DF | (England) Lee Roche | Manchester United | Free | 26 June 2003 |
| 1 | GK | (Denmark) Brian Jensen | West Bromwich Albion | Free | 30 June 2003 |
| 18 | MF | (England) Luke Chadwick | Manchester United | Loan | 10 July 2003 |
| 16 | MF | (Republic of Ireland) Gareth Farrelly | Bolton Wanderers | Loan | 1 September 2003 |
| 19 | FW | (Grenada) Delroy Facey | Bolton Wanderers | Loan | 1 September 2003 |
| 24 | DF | (England) Andy Todd | Blackburn Rovers | Loan | 4 September 2003 |
| 16 | DF | (England) Jay McEveley | Blackburn Rovers | Loan | 11 December 2003 |
| 19 | GK | (England) Nathan Abbey | Ipswich Town | Free | 16 January 2004 |
| 24 | MF | (England) Bradley Orr | Newcastle United | Loan | 28 January 2004 |
| 26 | GK | (United States) Paul Rachubka | Charlton Athletic | Loan | 29 January 2004 |
| 25 | MF | (England) Neil Wood | Manchester United | Loan | 29 January 2004 |
| 9 | FW | (Nigeria) Dele Adebola | Coventry City | Loan | 25 March 2004 |
| 16 | MF | (England) Lenny Johnrose | Swansea City | Free | 25 March 2004 |

=== Out ===
| # | Pos | Player | To | Fee | Date |
|---|---|---|---|---|---|
| | FW | (England) Anthony Shandran | Spennymoor United | Free | 20 May 2003 |
| | GK | (Greece) Nikolaos Michopoulos | Omonia Nicosia | Free | 20 May 2003 |
| | MF | (England) Mark Rasmussen | Accrington Stanley | Free | 20 May 2003 |
| | DF | (England) Earl Davis | Swansea City | Free | 20 May 2003 |
| | DF | (England) Andrew Leeson | Blyth Spartans | Free | 20 May 2003 |
| | MF | (England) Paul Cook | Accrington Stanley | Free | 23 May 2003 |
| | DF | (Guinea) Drissa Diallo | Ipswich Town | Free | 4 June 2003 |
| | DF | (Trinidad and Tobago) Ian Cox | Gillingham | Free | 5 June 2003 |
| | MF | (England) Gordon Armstrong | Accrington Stanley | Free | 5 June 2003 |
| | FW | (England) Andy Payton | Stalybridge Celtic | Free | 17 June 2003 |
| | MF | (England) Brad Maylett | Swansea City | Free | 18 June 2003 |
| | DF | (England) Steve Davis | Blackpool | Free | 2 July 2003 |
| | FW | (Greece) Dimitrios Papadopoulos | Panathinaikos | £200k | 4 July 2003 |
| | DF | (England) Lee Briscoe | Preston North End | Free | 22 July 2003 |
| | MF | (England) Andy Waine | Accrington Stanley | Free | 23 July 2003 |
| 9 | FW | (Wales) Gareth Taylor | Nottingham Forest | £500,000 | 27 August 2003 |
| 7 | MF | (England) Glen Little | Bolton Wanderers | Loan | 1 September 2003 |
| 17 | DF | (Ivory Coast) Arthur Gnohéré | Queens Park Rangers | Loan | 5 September 2003 |
| | GK | (England) Marlon Beresford | Bradford City | Free | 15 September 2003 |
| 17 | DF | (Ivory Coast) Arthur Gnohéré | Queens Park Rangers | Free | 19 February 2004 |

== Results ==
=== First Division ===
9 August 2003
3:00 pm

| Burnley | 2 – 3 | Crystal Palace |
|---|---|---|
| Blake 11'; Roche 19' | (Report) | Freedman 6' (pen.) 32' 67' |

Turf Moor, Burnley
Attendance: 12,976
Referee: C Foy

16 August 2003
5:35 pm

| West Bromwich Albion | 4 – 1 | Burnley |
|---|---|---|
| Šakiri 31'; Hulse 59'; Hughes 88' 89' | (Report) | Blake 28' |

The Hawthorns, West Bromwich
Attendance: 22,489
Referee: M Clattenburg

23 August 2003
3:00 pm

| Burnley | 0 – 2 | Wigan Athletic |
|---|---|---|
| | (Report) | Kennedy 13'; Ellington 77' |

Turf Moor, Burnley
Attendance: 13,231
Referee: A Butler

25 August 2003
3:00 pm

| Gillingham | 0 – 3 | Burnley |
|---|---|---|
| | (Report) | I. Moore 27'; West 30'; Blake 77' |

Priestfield Stadium, Gillingham
Attendance: 7,645
Referee: M Halsey

30 August 2003
3:00 pm

| Burnley | 1 – 0 | Crewe Alexandra |
|---|---|---|
| Chaplow 52' | (Report) |

Turf Moor, Burnley
Attendance: 11,495
Referee: G Laws

6 September 2003
3:00 pm

| Stoke City | 1 – 2 | Burnley |
|---|---|---|
| Asaba 53' | (Report) | May 18'; Chadwick 27' |

Britannia Stadium, Stoke-on-Trent
Attendance: 14,876
Referee: M Cooper

13 September 2003
3:00 pm

| Norwich City | 2 – 0 | Burnley |
|---|---|---|
| Crouch 58'; Roberts 90' | (Report) |

Carrow Road, Norwich
Attendance: 16,407
Referee: C Penton

16 September 2003
7:45 pm

| Burnley | 0 – 3 | Nottingham Forest |
|---|---|---|
| | (Report) | Harewood 7'; Reid 76'; Taylor 82' |

Turf Moor, Burnley
Attendance: 12,530
Referee: A Kaye

20 September 2003
3:00 pm

| Burnley | 4 – 0 | Bradford City |
|---|---|---|
| I. Moore 43'; Chadwick 54' 60'; Blake 68' | (Report) |

Turf Moor, Burnley
Attendance: 12,719
Referee: M Dean

27 September 2003
3:00 pm

| Wimbledon | 2 – 2 | Burnley |
|---|---|---|
| Holdsworth 66'; Agyemang 71' | (Report) | Blake 21' 37' |

National Hockey Stadium, Milton Keynes
Attendance: 5,639
Referee: M Warren

30 September 2003
7:45 pm

| Watford | 1 – 1 | Burnley |
|---|---|---|
| Fitzgerald 45' | (Report) | Chadwick 54' |

Vicarage Road, Watford
Attendance: 11,573
Referee: A Hall

4 October 2003
3:00 pm

| Burnley | 3 – 1 | Walsall |
|---|---|---|
| Facey 4' 82' 87' | (Report) | Merson 24' |

Turf Moor, Burnley
Attendance: 10,532
Referee: M Jones

14 October 2003
7:45 pm

| Ipswich Town | 6 – 1 | Burnley |
|---|---|---|
| Couñago 20' 22'; Wright 28'; Bart-Williams 30'; Chaplow 40' (o.g.); Kuqi 90' | (Report) | Facey 49' |

Portman Road, Ipswich
Attendance: 22,048
Referee: P Joslin

18 October 2003
3:00 pm

| West Ham United | 2 – 2 | Burnley |
|---|---|---|
| Connolly 20'; Hutchison 86' | (Report) | Facey 38'; I. Moore 82' |

Boleyn Ground, London
Attendance: 31,474
Referee: I Williamson

25 October 2003
3:00 pm

| Burnley | 1 – 1 | Millwall |
|---|---|---|
| I. Moore 60' | (Report) | Whelan 53' |

Turf Moor, Burnley
Attendance: 10,435
Referee: A Bates

1 November 2003
1:00 pm

| Burnley | 1 – 1 | Cardiff City |
|---|---|---|
| Chaplow 52' | (Report) | Earnshaw 76' |

Turf Moor, Burnley
Attendance: 10,886
Referee: H Webb

8 November 2003
3:00 pm

| Sheffield United | 1 – 0 | Burnley |
|---|---|---|
| Tonge 45' | (Report) |

Bramall Lane, Sheffield
Attendance: 20,967
Referee: G Cain

15 November 2003
3:00 pm

| Derby County | 2 – 0 | Burnley |
|---|---|---|
| Morris 20'; Taylor 90' (pen.) | (Report) |

Turf Moor, Burnley
Attendance: 21,960
Referee: U Rennie

22 November 2003
3:00 pm

| Burnley | 1 – 1 | Rotherham United |
|---|---|---|
| Blake 35' | (Report) | Mullin 51' |

Turf Moor, Burnley
Attendance: 12,928
Referee: R Olivier

25 November 2003
7:45 pm

| Burnley | 3 – 0 | Reading |
|---|---|---|
| Blake 5'; Chaplow 47'; Chadwick 54' | (Report) |

Turf Moor, Burnley
Attendance: 9,473
Referee: M Pike

29 November 2003
3:00 pm

| Sunderland | 1 – 1 | Burnley |
|---|---|---|
| Kyle 39' | (Report) | I. Moore 72' |

Stadium of Light, Sunderland
Attendance: 29,852
Referee: A Kaye

6 December 2003
3:00 pm

| Burnley | 3 – 2 | Sheffield United |
|---|---|---|
| Blake 17' 45' (pen.); I. Moore 34' | (Report) | Montgomery 24'; Whitlow 31' |

Turf Moor, Burnley
Attendance: 11,452
Referee: N Barry

13 December 2003
3:00 pm

| Burnley | 1 – 2 | Coventry City |
|---|---|---|
| Blake 53' | (Report) | Suffo 8'; Weller 40' (o.g.) |

Turf Moor, Burnley
Attendance: 10,358
Referee: M Fletcher

20 December 2003
12:30 pm

| Preston North End | 5 – 3 | Burnley |
|---|---|---|
| Fuller 18' 71' 82'; Lewis 60'; Healy 88' | (Report) | I. Moore 24'; Gnohéré 64'; Blake 78' (pen.) |

Deepdale, Preston
Attendance: 18,802
Referee: M Dean

26 December 2003
3:00 pm

| Crewe Alexandra | 3 – 1 | Burnley |
|---|---|---|
| Ashton 37'; S. Jones 55' 90' | (Report) | Blake 89' (pen.) |

Gresty Road, Crewe
Attendance: 9,512
Referee: T Parkes

28 December 2003
3:00 pm

| Burnley | 0 – 1 | Stoke City |
|---|---|---|
| | (Report) | Akinbiyi 52' |

Turf Moor, Burnley
Attendance: 12,812
Referee: D Gallagher

10 January 2004
3:00 pm

| Crystal Palace | 0 – 0 | Burnley |
|---|---|---|
| | (Report) |

Selhurst Park, London
Attendance: 15,276
Referee: A Wiley

17 January 2004
3:00 pm

| Burnley | 1 – 1 | West Bromwich Albion |
|---|---|---|
| Blake 68' | (Report) | Horsfield 73' |

Turf Moor, Burnley
Attendance: 13,106
Referee: N Miller

31 January 2004
3:00 pm

| Wigan Athletic | 0 – 0 | Burnley |
|---|---|---|
| | (Report) |

JJB Stadium, Wigan
Attendance: 11,147
Referee: U Rennie

7 February 2004
3:00 pm

| Burnley | 1 – 0 | Gillingham |
|---|---|---|
| Little 83' | (Report) |

Turf Moor, Burnley
Attendance: 10,400
Referee: P Danson

21 February 2004
3:00 pm

| Burnley | 4 – 2 | Ipswich Town |
|---|---|---|
| Little 26'; May 28'; Chaplow 61'; Blake 90' | (Report) | Westlake 65'; Reuser 88' |

Turf Moor, Burnley
Attendance: 11,343
Referee: M Dean

24 February 2004
8:00 pm

| Reading | 2 – 2 | Burnley |
|---|---|---|
| Owusu 19'; Harper 90' | (Report) | I. Moore 23'; May 67' |

Madejski Stadium, Reading
Attendance: 10,543
Referee: A Penn

28 February 2004
3:00 pm

| Millwall | 2 – 0 | Burnley |
|---|---|---|
| Ifill 12'; Sweeney 52' | (Report) |

The New Den, London
Attendance: 10,148
Referee: A Butler

2 March 2004
7:45 pm

| Burnley | 1 – 1 | West Ham United |
|---|---|---|
| Branch 31' | (Report) | Connolly 36' (pen.) |

Turf Moor, Burnley
Attendance: 12,440
Referee: P Dowd

6 March 2004
3:00 pm

| Burnley | 1 – 1 | Preston North End |
|---|---|---|
| Blake 19' | (Report) | Alexander 58' (pen.) |

Turf Moor, Burnley
Attendance: 15,837
Referee: D Pugh

13 March 2004
3:00 pm

| Coventry City | 4 – 0 | Burnley |
|---|---|---|
| Joachim 10'; McSheffrey 33' 39' (pen.); Konjić 78' | (Report) |

Highfield Road, Coventry
Attendance: 12,953
Referee: A Bates

17 March 2004
7:45 pm

| Nottingham Forest | 1 – 1 | Burnley |
|---|---|---|
| Taylor 80' | (Report) | Chaplow 15' |

City Ground, Nottingham
Attendance: 26,885
Referee: R Olivier

27 March 2004
3:00 pm

| Bradford City | 1 – 2 | Burnley |
|---|---|---|
| Cadamarteri 18' | (Report) | Blake 8'; I. Moore 90' |

Valley Parade, Bradford
Attendance: 13,667
Referee: G Laws

3 April 2004
3:00 pm

| Burnley | 3 – 5 | Norwich City |
|---|---|---|
| Wood 7'; May 30'; Blake 38' | (Report) | Svensson 14' 62'; Huckerby 32' 89'; McKenzie 51' |

Turf Moor, Burnley
Attendance: 12,417
Referee: A Hall

10 April 2004
3:00 pm

| Walsall | 0 – 1 | Burnley |
|---|---|---|
| | (Report) | Blake 56' (pen.) |

Bescot Stadium, Walsall
Attendance: 7,769
Referee: S Bennett

12 April 2004
3:00 pm

| Burnley | 2 – 3 | Watford |
|---|---|---|
| McGregor 30'; Adebola 86' | (Report) | Devlin 39' (pen.); Helguson 55'; Cook 84' |

Turf Moor, Burnley
Attendance: 11,413
Referee: C Boyeson

17 April 2004
3:00 pm

| Cardiff City | 2 – 0 | Burnley |
|---|---|---|
| Langley 78' (pen.); Campbell 80' | (Report) |

Ninian Park, Cardiff
Attendance: 13,525
Referee: M Jones

20 April 2004
7:45 pm

| Burnley | 2 – 0 | Wimbledon |
|---|---|---|
| Branch 26'; Ntimban-Zeh 45' (o.g.) | (Report) |

Turf Moor, Burnley
Attendance: 13,555
Referee: G Cain

24 April 2004
3:00 pm

| Burnley | 1 – 0 | Derby County |
|---|---|---|
| Branch 42' | (Report) |

Turf Moor, Burnley
Attendance: 16,189
Referee: E Evans

1 May 2004
3:00 pm

| Rotherham United | 3 – 0 | Burnley |
|---|---|---|
| Butler 15'; Stockdale 39'; Proctor 85' (pen.) | (Report) |

Millmoor, Rotherham
Attendance: 9,157
Referee: P Walton

9 May 2004
1:00 pm

| Burnley | 1 – 2 | Sunderland |
|---|---|---|
| Little 11' | (Report) | Breen 37'; Kyle 66' |

Turf Moor, Burnley
Attendance: 18,852
Referee: K Hill

=== Final league position ===
| Pos | Team | Pld | W | D | L | GF | GA | GD | Pts |
|---|---|---|---|---|---|---|---|---|---|
| 17 | Rotherham United | 46 | 13 | 15 | 18 | 53 | 61 | −8 | 54 |
| 18 | Crewe Alexandra | 46 | 14 | 11 | 21 | 57 | 66 | −9 | 53 |
| 19 | Burnley | 46 | 13 | 14 | 19 | 60 | 77 | −17 | 53 |
| 20 | Derby County | 46 | 13 | 13 | 20 | 53 | 67 | −14 | 52 |
| 21 | Gillingham | 46 | 14 | 9 | 23 | 48 | 67 | −19 | 51 |

Source: Soccerway
Rules for classification: 1) points; 2) goal difference; 3) number of goals scored.

=== League Cup ===
==== First round ====
12 August 2003
7:45 pm

| Chesterfield | 0 – 0 (a.e.t.) | Burnley |
|---|---|---|
| | Report |
Penalties
| Brandon (penalty scored); Payne (penalty scored); Hudson (penalty missed); Hurst (penalty missed); Evatt (penalty missed) | 2 – 3 | (penalty scored) Weller; (penalty scored) West; (penalty missed) Blake; (penalty scored) Little |

Saltergate, Chesterfield
Attendance: 2,928
Referee: P Robinson

==== Second round ====
23 September 2003
7:30 pm

| Scunthorpe United | 2 – 3 | Burnley |
|---|---|---|
| MacLean 32'; Beagrie 85' | Report | Chadwick 22'; Blake 42'; I. Moore 77' |

Glanford Park, Scunthorpe
Attendance: 2,915
Referee: M Fletcher

==== Third round ====
28 October 2003
7:45pm

| Wolverhampton Wanderers | 2 – 0 | Burnley |
|---|---|---|
| Miller 48'; Craddock 81' | Report |

Molineux Stadium, Wolverhampton
Attendance: 18,548
Referee: Chris Foy

=== FA Cup ===
==== Third round ====
3 January 2004
3:00 pm

| Mansfield Town | 0 – 2 | Burnley |
|---|---|---|
| | Report | I. Moore 30', 73' |

Field Mill, Mansfield
Attendance: 8,290
Referee: P Prosser

==== Fourth round ====
24 January 2004
3:00 pm

| Burnley | 3 – 1 | Gillingham |
|---|---|---|
| I. Moore 30'; Blake 33', 64' | Report | Henderson 71' |

Turf Moor, Burnley
Attendance: 9,735
Referee: Graham Laws

==== Fifth round ====
14 February 2004
3:00 pm

| Millwall | 1 – 0 | Burnley |
|---|---|---|
| Dichio 70' | Report |

The New Den, London
Attendance: 10,420
Referee: Howard Webb
