= 2002–03 Burnley F.C. season =

English football club season

Burnley
2002–03 season
- Chairman: Barry Kilby
- Manager: Stan Ternent
- First Division: 16th
- FA Cup: Quarter-final
- League Cup: Fourth round
- Top goalscorer: League: Gareth Taylor (16); All: Gareth Taylor (17)
- Highest home attendance: 22,034 (vs. Manchester United, 3 December)
- Lowest home attendance: 5,436 (vs. Grimsby Town, 14 January)
- Average home league attendance: 13,977

The 2002–03 season was Burnley's 3rd season in the second tier of English football. They were managed by Stan Ternent in his fifth full season since he replaced Chris Waddle at the beginning 1998–99 campaign.

== Season summary ==
Four straight losses at the beginning of the season saw Burnley bottom of the First Division, before a ten-match unbeaten run lifted the Clarets to the brink of the play-off places. However, that would be as good as it got for the Lancashire club, who spent most of the season hovering in mid-table. A poor finish to the season – 10 losses in the club's final 14 matches – saw them fall to 16th. Burnley's downfall was their poor defence, which was the worst in the league: 5 goals conceded against Reading, 6 against Grimsby and Rotherham, 7 against Sheffield Wednesday and Watford, and 89 overall, the worst in the First Division and third-worst in the entire Football League.

== Appearances and goals ==
No.	Pos	Nat	Player	Total		First Division		League Cup		FA Cup	
No.	Pos	Nat	Player	Apps	Goals	Apps	Goals	Apps	Goals	Apps	Goals
1	GK	(Greece) GRE	Nikolaos Michopoulos	14	0	13	0	0	0	1	0
2	DF	(England) ENG	Dean West	49	5	41	4	3	1	5	0
3	DF	(Guinea) GUI	Drissa Diallo	18	2	14	1	0	0	4	1
5	DF	(England) ENG	Steve Davis	32	5	25+3	4	3	1	0+1	0
6	DF	(England) ENG	Gordon Armstrong	7	0	1+5	0	0	0	0+1	0
7	MF	(England) ENG	Glen Little	40	7	28+5	5	2+1	0	1+3	2
8	MF	(England) ENG	Paul Cook	31	1	21+2	0	1+1	0	5+1	1
9	FW	(Wales) WAL	Gareth Taylor	48	17	38+2	16	3+1	0	4	1
10	FW	(England) ENG	Andy Payton	2	0	0+1	0	0	0	0+1	0
11	MF	(England) ENG	Matthew O'Neill	7	0	2+5	0	0	0	0	0
12	MF	(England) ENG	Tony Grant	44	1	24+10	1	3+1	0	6	0
14	DF	(Trinidad and Tobago) TRI	Ian Cox	33	1	23+3	1	2	0	4+1	0
15	MF	(England) ENG	Graham Branch	41	0	31+1	0	2+1	0	6	0
16	FW	(England) ENG	Ian Moore	52	11	35+9	8	2	0	6	3
17	FW	(England) ENG	Anthony Shandran	0	0	0	0	0	0	0	0
18	MF	(England) ENG	Paul Weller	40	1	26+8	0	3	0	1+2	1
19	DF	(England) ENG	Lee Briscoe	41	2	32+1	2	4	0	4	0
20	MF	(England) ENG	Brad Maylett	6	0	1+5	0	0	0	0	0
21	FW	(England) ENG	Mark Rasmussen	2	0	0+2	0	0	0	0	0
22	GK	(England) ENG	Marlon Beresford	43	0	33+1	0	4	0	5	0
23	DF	(England) ENG	Mark McGregor	37	1	25+5	1	3	0	2+2	0
25	MF	(England) ENG	Lenny Johnrose	6	0	5+1	0	0	0	0	0
26	DF	(Ivory Coast) CIV	Arthur Gnohéré	40	2	31+2	2	4	0	3	0
27	FW	(England) ENG	Robbie Blake	49	16	34+7	13	4	1	3+1	2
28	MF	(Republic of Ireland) IRL	Alan Moore	36	3	14+13	1	1+2	0	5+1	2
29	FW	(Greece) GRE	Dimitrios Papadopoulos	40	6	7+27	3	0+4	3	1+1	0
30	MF	(England) ENG	Richard Chaplow	5	0	2+3	0	0	0	0	0
31	MF	(England) ENG	Joel Pilkington	0	0	0	0	0	0	0	0
32	DF	(England) ENG	Earl Davis	0	0	0	0	0	0	0	0
33	MF	(England) ENG	Andy Waine	2	0	0+2	0	0	0	0	0
34	DF	(England) ENG	Andrew Leeson	0	0	0	0	0	0	0	0

== Transfers ==
=== In ===
#	Pos	Player	From	Fee	Date
22	GK	(England) Marlon Beresford	York City	Free	5 September 2002
3	DF	(Guinea) Drissa Diallo	KV Mechelen	Free	10 January 2003

=== Out ===
#	Pos	Player	To	Fee	Date
	MF	(England) Lenny Johnrose		Released	24 April 2002
	MF	(England) Kevin Ball		Retired	24 April 2002
	DF	(England) John Williamson		Released	24 April 2002
	GK	(Greece) Luigi Cennamo		Released	24 April 2002
	DF	(England) Mitchell Thomas		Retired	24 April 2002
	MF	(England) Paul Gascoigne		Released	16 August 2002
	MF	(England) Tony Ellis	Leigh RMI	Free	16 August 2002
1	GK	(Greece) Nikolaos Michopoulos	Crystal Palace	Loan	28 September 2002
25	MF	(England) Lenny Johnrose	Bury	Free	4 October 2002
32	DF	(England) Earl Davis	Stalybridge Celtic	Loan	26 November 2002
17	FW	(England) Anthony Shandran	York City	Loan	31 January 2003
32	DF	(England) Earl Davis	Southport	Loan	7 March 2003
20	MF	(England) Brad Maylett	Swansea City	Loan	15 March 2003
7	MF	(England) Glen Little	Reading	Loan	1 April 2003

== Results ==
=== First Division ===
10 August 2002	Burnley	1–3	Brighton & Hove Albion	Turf Moor, Burnley
15:00	Briscoe 90'	(Report)	Melton 29'; Brooker 65'; Zamora 67'	Attendance: 14,738; Referee: Anthony Bates

17 August 2002	Wolverhampton Wanderers	3–0	Burnley	Molineux Stadium, Wolverhampton
5:35pm	Blake 2'; Irwin 49'; Cooper 88'	(Report)		Attendance: 25,031; Referee: Jeff Winter

24 August 2002	Burnley	0–1	Sheffield United	Turf Moor, Burnley
15:00		(Report)	Onuora 35'	Attendance: 12,868; Referee: R Pearson

27 August 2002	Reading	3–0	Burnley	Madejski Stadium, Reading
15:00	Cureton 55', 90'; Butler 87'	(Report)		Attendance: 12,009; Referee: Paul Taylor

31 August 2002	Burnley	0–0	Crystal Palace	Turf Moor, Burnley
15:00		(Report)		Attendance: 12,407; Referee: M Fletcher

7 September 2002	Derby County	1–2	Burnley	Pride Park Stadium, Burnley
15:00	Bolder 8'	(Report)	Blake 51' (pen.); Barton 55' (o.g.)	Attendance: 22,343; Referee: A Hall

14 September 2002	Burnley	2–1	Stoke City	Turf Moor, Burnley
15:00	Gnohéré 76'; Papadopoulos 81'	(Report)	Guðjónsson 74'	Attendance: 14,244; Referee: D Pugh

17 September 2002	Burnley	2–2	Millwall	Turf Moor, Burnley
19:45	West 18' (pen.); I. Moore 85'	(Report)	Livermore 31'; Davies 64'	Attendance: 11,878 (0 away fans); Referee: Howard Webb

21 September 2002	Bradford City	2–2	Burnley	Valley Parade, Bradford
15:00	Gray 17'; Proctor 90'	(Report)	Blake 57'; Taylor 76'	Attendance: 14,561; Referee: Mike Dean

28 September 2002	Burnley	1–0	Wimbledon	Turf Moor, Burnley
15:00	Little 51'	(Report)		Attendance: 12,259; Referee: S Mathieson

5 October 2002	Sheffield Wednesday	1–3	Burnley	Hillsborough, Sheffield
15:00	Donnelly 67'	(Report)	Taylor 8'; Little 57'; I. Moore 60'	Attendance: 17,004; Referee: T Parkes

12 October 2002	Burnley	2–1	Walsall	Turf Moor, Burnley
15:00	Blake 42'; Davis 69'	(Report)	Birch 79'	Attendance: 12,907; Referee: B Curson

19 October 2002	Leicester City	0–1	Burnley	Walkers Stadium, Leicester
15:00		(Report)	I. Moore 55'	Attendance: 26,254; Referee: K Hill

22 October 2002	Ipswich Town	2–2	Burnley	Portman Road, Ipswich
19:45	McGreal 2'; Ambrose 16'	(Report)	Gnohéré 6'; Papadopoulos 90'	Attendance: 22,736; Referee: Phil Joslin

26 October 2002	Burnley	0–3	Portsmouth	Turf Moor, Burnley
15:00		(Report)	Quashie 21'; Todorov 58'; Harper 86'	Attendance: 15,788; Referee: M Clattenburg

29 October 2002	Grimsby Town	6–5	Burnley	Blundell Park, Grimsby
19:45	Kabba 3', 31'; Livingstone 28'; Campbell 36'; Pouton 56' (pen.); Ford 72'	(Report)	Taylor 22', 49'; I. Moore 31'; Blake 45', 83' (pen.)	Attendance: 5,620; Referee: Paul Danson

2 November 2002	Preston North End	3–1	Burnley	Deepdale, Preston
5:35pm	Fuller 3', 66'; McKenna 62'	(Report)	Taylor 51'	Attendance: 16,046; Referee: G Cain

9 November 2002	Burnley	3–1	Coventry City	Turf Moor, Burnley
15:00	Blake 15' (pen.); Grant 35'; Davenport 86' (o.g.)	(Report)	McAllister 66' (pen.)	Attendance: 13,470; Referee: Mike Jones

16 November 2002	Rotherham United	0–0	Burnley	Millmoor, Rotherham
15:00		(Report)		Attendance: 7,575; Referee: A Hall

23 November 2002	Burnley	2–0	Norwich City	Turf Moor, Burnley
15:00	McGregor 59'; Little 85'	(Report)		Attendance: 16,282; Referee: P Prosser

30 November 2002	Watford	2–1	Burnley	Vicarage Road, Watford
15:00	Helguson 40'; Smith 72' (pen.)	(Report)	Taylor 76'	Attendance: 13,977; Referee: Ray Olivier

7 December 2002	Burnley	1–0	Nottingham Forest	Turf Moor, Burnley
15:00	Briscoe 28'	(Report)		Attendance: 13,869; Referee: L Cable

14 December 2002	Burnley	2–6	Rotherham United	Turf Moor, Burnley
15:00	Davis 67', 78'	(Report)	Lee 12', 59'; Mullin 27', 30'; Byfield 84', 89'	Attendance: 14,121; Referee: Chris Foy

20 December 2002	Gillingham	4–2	Burnley	Priestfield Stadium, Gillingham
12:30pm	Wallace 17'; Smith 41', 45'; King 64'	(Report)	Taylor 28'; Blake 76' (pen.)	Attendance: 7,905; Referee: G Hegley

26 December 2002	Burnley	2–1	Wolverhampton Wanderers	Turf Moor, Burnley
15:00	Taylor 24'; West 32'	(Report)	Butler 85'	Attendance: 18,641; Referee: M Messias

28 December 2002	Brighton & Hove Albion	2–2	Burnley	Withdean Stadium, Brighton
15:00	Sidwell 88', 89'	(Report)	Little 44'; I. Moore 71'	Attendance: 6,502; Referee: T Parkes

11 January 2003	Burnley	1–1	Ipswich Town	Turf Moor, Burnley
15:00	Blake 66' (pen.)	(Report)	Couñago 22'	Attendance: 15,501; Referee: A Hall

18 January 2003	Crystal Palace	1–1	Burnley	Selhurst Park, London
15:00	Popovic 62' (pen.)	(Report)	Taylor 44'	Attendance: 16,344; Referee: M Cooper

1 February 2003	Burnley	2–5	Reading	Turf Moor, Burnley
15:00	I. Moore 55'; West 90'	(Report)	Sidwell 37', 79'; Salako 45', 52'; Henderson 90'	Attendance: 14,420; Referee: R Pearson

8 February 2003	Coventry City	0–1	Burnley	Highfield Road, Coventry
15:00		(Report)	Cox 35'	Attendance: 13,659; Referee: G Cain

22 February 2003	Burnley	2–0	Derby County	Turf Moor, Burnley
15:00	I. Moore 8'; Taylor 23'	(Report)		Attendance: 15,063; Referee: D Crick

1 March 2003	Stoke City	0–1	Burnley	Britannia Stadium, Stoke-on-Trent
15:00		(Report)	West 56'	Attendance: 12,874; Referee: Phil Joslin

4 March 2003	Millwall	1–1	Burnley	The New Den, London
19:45	Sadlier 84'	(Report)	I. Moore 18'	Attendance: 6,045; Referee: M Cooper

12 March 2003	Sheffield United	4–2	Burnley	Bramall Lane, Sheffield
19:45	Brown 17', 36'; Ndlovu 66', 72'	(Report)	Taylor 64'; Blake 90'	Attendance: 17,359; Referee: A Butler

15 March 2003	Walsall	3–2	Burnley	Bescot Stadium, Walsall
15:00	Leitão 24'; Carbon 33'; Matías 66'	(Report)	Blake 74' (pen.); Little 90'	Attendance: 6,327; Referee: Peter Walton

18 March 2003	Burnley	1–2	Leicester City	Turf Moor, Burnley
19:45	Sinclair 90' (o.g.)	(Report)	Dickov 79'; Benjamin 65'	Attendance: 14,544; Referee: A Kaye

22 March 2003	Burnley	1–1	Grimsby Town	Turf Moor, Burnley
15:00	A. Moore 52'	(Report)	Campbell 43'	Attendance: 13,445; Referee: F Stretton

25 March 2003	Burnley	0–2	Bradford City	Turf Moor, Burnley
19:45		(Report)	Jørgensen 18'; Gray 89'	Attendance: 11,095; Referee: C Webster

5 April 2003	Burnley	4–7	Watford	Turf Moor, Burnley
15:00	Taylor 15', 39', 45'; Davis 35'	(Report)	Brown 13'; Hyde 16'; Cox 26'; Chopra 29', 40', 61', 90'	Attendance: 10,208; Referee: Phil Dowd

8 April 2003	Burnley	2–0	Preston North End	Turf Moor, Burnley
19:45	Papadopoulos 42'; Blake 61'	(Report)		Attendance: 12,245; Referee: Mark Halsey

12 April 2003	Norwich City	2–0	Burnley	Carrow Road, Norwich
15:00	Nedergaard 3'; Abbey 67'	(Report)		Attendance: 20,026; Referee: S Tomlin

15 April 2003	Portsmouth	1–0	Burnley	Fratton Park, Portsmouth
19:45	Todorov 73'	(Report)		Attendance: 19,221; Referee: B Curson

19 April 2003	Burnley	2–0	Gillingham	Turf Moor, Burnley
15:00	Taylor 28'; Diallo 50'	(Report)		Attendance: 14,031; Referee: Steve Baines

21 April 2003	Nottingham Forest	2–0	Burnley	City Ground, Nottingham
15:00	Dawson 75'; Johnson 90'	(Report)		Attendance: 25,403; Referee: Anthony Bates

26 April 2003	Burnley	2–7	Sheffield Wednesday	Turf Moor, Burnley
1:30pm	Blake 42' (pen.) 53'	(Report)	McLaren 3'; Westwood 5'; Wood 32'; Evans 47'; Haslam 66'; Gnohéré 73' (o.g.); Quinn 80'	Attendance: 17,435; Referee: Mark Clattenburg

4 May 2003	Wimbledon	2–1	Burnley	Selhurst Park, London
1:30pm	Connolly 55', 81'	(Report)	Taylor 27'	Attendance: 1,972; Referee: P Armstrong

=== Final league position ===
Pos	Team	Pld	W	D	L	GF	GA	GD	Pts
14	Crystal Palace	46	14	17	15	59	52	+7	59
15	Rotherham United	46	15	14	17	62	62	0	59
16	Burnley	46	15	10	21	65	89	−24	55
17	Walsall	46	15	9	22	57	69	−12	54
18	Derby County	46	15	7	24	55	74	−19	52

Updated to match(es) played on 11 May 2003. Source: Soccerway
Rules for classification: 1) points; 2) goal difference; 3) number of goals scored.

=== League Cup ===
10 September 2002 1	Burnley	3–0	Blackpool	Turf Moor, Burnley
19:45	West 13'; Papadopoulos 63', 75'	(Report)		Attendance: 7,448 (2,226 away); Referee: C Webster

1 October 2002 2	Huddersfield Town	0–1 (a.e.t.)	Burnley	Galpharm Stadium, Huddersfield
19:45		(Report)	Papadopoulos 104'	Attendance: 5,887 (2,296 away); Referee: G Laws

6 November 2002 3	Burnley	2–1	Tottenham Hotspur	Turf Moor, Burnley
19:45	Blake 57'; Davis 61'	(Report)	Poyet 17'	Attendance: 13,512 (1,800 away); Referee: D Gallagher

3 December 2002 4	Burnley	0–2	Manchester United	Turf Moor, Burnley
19:45		(Report)	Forlán 35'; Solskjær 65'	Attendance: 22,034 (4,150 away); Referee: N Barry

=== FA Cup ===
4 January 2003 3	Grimsby Town	2–2	Burnley	Blundell Park, Grimsby
15:00	Cooke 57' (pen.); Mansaram 87'	(Report)	A. Moore 14'; Weller 73'	Attendance: 5,350 (1,126 away); Referee: Graham Laws

14 January 2003 3 (replay)	Burnley	4–0	Grimsby Town	Turf Moor, Burnley
19:45	I. Moore 25', 90'; Little 79'; Blake 86' (pen.)	(Report)		Attendance: 5,436 (379 away); Referee: Graham Laws

25 January 2003 4	Brentford	0–3	Burnley	Griffin Park, London
15:00		(Report)	Blake 52'; Cook 86'; Little 89'	Attendance: 9,563 (1,732 away); Referee: K Hill

16 February 2003 5	Fulham	1–1	Burnley	Loftus Road, London
15:00	Malbranque 45'	(Report)	A. Moore 4'	Attendance: 13,062 (2,910 away); Referee: Graham Poll

26 February 2003 5 (replay)	Burnley	3–0	Fulham	Turf Moor, Burnley
19:45	Taylor 27'; I. Moore 35'; Diallo 52'	(Report)		Attendance: 11,635 (303 away); Referee: Phil Dowd

9 March 2003 Quarter-final	Watford	2–0	Burnley	Vicarage Road, Watford
1:30pm	Smith 74'; Glass 80'	(Report)		Attendance: 20,336 (4,494 away); Referee: Alan Wiley
