= 2004–05 Burnley F.C. season =

English football club season

Burnley
2004–05 season
- Chairman: Barry Kilby
- Manager: Steve Cotterill
- Championship: 13th
- FA Cup: Fifth round
- League Cup: Fourth round
- Top goalscorer: League: Robbie Blake (10); All: Robbie Blake (13)
- Highest home attendance: 21,468 v Blackburn Rovers (20 February 2005)
- Lowest home attendance: 5,013 v Wolverhampton Wanderers (21 September 2004)
- Average home league attendance: 12,640
Home colours	Away colours

The 2004–05 season was Burnley's 5th season in the second tier of English football. They were managed by Steve Cotterill in his first full season since he replaced Stan Ternent at the beginning of the campaign.

== Appearances and goals ==
No.	Pos	Nat	Player	Total		Championship		League Cup		FA Cup	
No.	Pos	Nat	Player	Apps	Goals	Apps	Goals	Apps	Goals	Apps	Goals
1	GK	(Wales) WAL	Danny Coyne	22	0	20+0	0	2+0	0	0+0	0
2	DF	(England) ENG	Lee Roche	36	1	17+12	1	2+1	0	1+3	0
3	DF	(Guinea) GUI	Mo Camara	53	1	45+0	0	4+0	1	4+0	0
4	DF	(England) ENG	John McGreal	45	1	38+1	1	3+0	0	3+0	0
5	DF	(Jamaica) JAM	Frank Sinclair	42	1	36+0	1	1+1	0	4+0	0
6	DF	(Northern Ireland) NIR	Michael Duff	48	0	37+5	0	4+0	0	2+0	0
7	MF	(England) ENG	Richard Chaplow	25	2	16+5	2	2+0	0	2+0	0
7	MF	(England) ENG	Peter Whittingham (on loan)	9	0	7+0	0	0+0	0	2+0	0
7	MF	(Republic of Ireland) IRL	James O'Connor	8	2	8+0	2	0+0	0	0+0	0
8	FW	(England) ENG	Robbie Blake	28	13	24+0	10	4+0	3	0+0	0
8	MF	(Wales) WAL	John Oster	18	1	12+3	1	0+0	0	2+1	0
9	DF	(England) ENG	Graham Branch	50	4	39+4	3	4+0	1	1+2	0
10	FW	(England) ENG	Ian Moore	41	6	30+5	4	2+0	0	4+0	2
11	MF	(England) ENG	Tony Grant	50	2	37+5	2	4+0	0	4+0	0
12	GK	(Denmark) DEN	Brian Jensen	33	0	26+1	0	2+0	0	4+0	0
14	MF	(England) ENG	Matthew O'Neill	2	0	0+2	0	0+0	0	0+0	0
15	MF	(England) ENG	Joel Pilkington	3	0	0+1	0	0+1	0	0+1	0
16	DF	(England) ENG	Paul Scott	0	0	0+0	0	0+0	0	0+0	0
17	MF	(Jamaica) JAM	Micah Hyde	46	2	37+1	1	4+0	0	4+0	1
20	FW	(Nigeria) NGA	Ade Akinbiyi	10	4	9+1	4	0+0	0	0+0	0
21	FW	(England) ENG	Dean Bowditch (on loan)	10	1	8+2	1	0+0	0	0+0	0
22	DF	(England) ENG	Gary Cahill (on loan)	32	1	27+0	1	1+0	0	4+0	0
23	MF	(England) ENG	Mark Yates	0	0	0+0	0	0+0	0	0+0	0
23	MF	(Republic of Ireland) IRL	James O'Connor (on loan)	13	0	12+1	0	0+0	0	0+0	0
23	FW	(England) ENG	Cayne Hanley	0	0	0+0	0	0+0	0	0+0	0
24	DF	(Wales) WAL	Richard Duffy (on loan)	9	1	3+4	1	0+0	0	2+0	0
25	MF	(France) FRA	Jean-Louis Valois	37	4	18+12	3	2+1	1	3+1	0
26	MF	(France) FRA	Amadou Sanokho	4	0	0+3	0	1+0	0	0+0	0
27	DF	(Australia) AUS	Ryan Townsend	0	0	0+0	0	0+0	0	0+0	0

== Transfers ==
=== In ===
#	Pos	Player	From	Fee	Date
4	DF	(England) John McGreal	Ipswich Town	Free	18 May 2004
27	MF	(England) Mark Yates	Kidderminster Harriers	Free	1 July 2004
6	DF	(Northern Ireland) Michael Duff	Cheltenham Town	£30k	5 July 2004
18	MF	(Jamaica) Micah Hyde	Watford	Free	15 July 2004
1	GK	(Wales) Danny Coyne	Leicester City	£25k	17 July 2004
5	DF	(Jamaica) Frank Sinclair	Leicester City	Free	23 July 2004
25	MF	(France) Jean-Louis Valois	Clyde	Free	10 September 2004
24	DF	(Wales) Richard Duffy	Portsmouth	Loan	24 September 2004
23	MF	(Republic of Ireland) James O'Connor	West Bromwich Albion	Loan	29 October 2004
22	DF	(England) Gary Cahill	Aston Villa	Loan	9 November 2004
8	MF	(Wales) John Oster	Sunderland	Free	29 January 2005
7	MF	(England) Peter Whittingham	Aston Villa	Loan	14 February 2005
20	FW	(Nigeria) Ade Akinbiyi	Stoke City	£600k	24 February 2005
21	FW	(England) Dean Bowditch	Ipswich Town	Loan	9 March 2005
7	MF	(Republic of Ireland) James O'Connor	West Bromwich Albion	£175k	24 March 2005

=== Out ===
#	Pos	Player	To	Fee	Date
	DF	(England) David May	Bacup Borough	Free	1 June 2004
	MF	(England) Lenny Johnrose		Retired	1 June 2004
	MF	(England) Glen Little	Reading	Free	30 June 2004
	MF	(Republic of Ireland) Alan Moore	Shelbourne	Free	1 July 2004
	GK	(England) Nathan Abbey	Boston United	Free	1 July 2004
	DF	(England) Dean West	Lincoln City	Free	6 July 2004
	DF	(England) Mark McGregor	Blackpool	Free	27 July 2004
	MF	(England) Paul Weller	Rochdale	Free	30 September 2004
27	DF	(Australia) Ryan Townsend		Released	1 November 2004
8	FW	(England) Robbie Blake	Birmingham City	£1.25m	5 January 2005
7	MF	(England) Richard Chaplow	West Bromwich Albion	£1.5m	31 January 2005
14	MF	(England) Matthew O'Neill	Accrington Stanley	Loan	18 February 2005
26	MF	(France) Amadou Sanokho	Oldham Athletic	Free	21 March 2005
10	FW	(England) Ian Moore	Leeds United	£50k	24 March 2005

== Matches ==
=== Championship ===
7 August 2004 1	Burnley	1–1	Sheffield United	Burnley
15:00	Hyde 16'	(Report)	Gray 52'	Stadium: Turf Moor; Attendance: 16,956; Referee: P Joslin

10 August 2004 2	Rotherham United	0–0	Burnley	Rotherham
19:45		(Report)		Stadium: Millmoor; Attendance: 6,243; Referee: C Foy

14 August 2004 3	Watford	0–1	Burnley	Watford
15:00		(Report)	Moore 64'	Stadium: Vicarage Road; Attendance: 12,048; Referee: R Olivier

21 August 2004 4	Burnley	1–1	Wolverhampton Wanderers	Burnley
15:00	Blake 24'	(Report)	Newton 15'	Stadium: Turf Moor; Attendance: 13,869; Referee: C Webster

28 August 2004 5	West Ham United	1–0	Burnley	London
15:00	Nowland 62'	(Report)		Stadium: Boleyn Ground; Attendance: 22,119; Referee: P Robinson

30 August 2004 6	Burnley	1–2	Gillingham	Burnley
15:00	Moore 87'	(Report)	Roberts 5'; Byfield 69'	Stadium: Turf Moor; Attendance: 11,574; Referee: R Beeby

11 September 2004 7	Burnley	3–0	Crewe Alexandra	Burnley
15:00	McGreal 12'; Blake 42'; Chaplow 49'	(Report)		Stadium: Turf Moor; Attendance: 11,274; Referee: G Hegley

14 September 2004 8	Wigan Athletic	0–0	Burnley	Wigan
20:00		(Report)		Stadium: JJB Stadium; Attendance: 9,746; Referee: P Armstrong

18 September 2004 9	Leicester City	0–0	Burnley	Leicester
15:00		(Report)		Stadium: Walkers Stadium; Attendance: 22,495; Referee: I Williamson

20 September 2004 10	Burnley	2–2	Stoke City	Burnley
15:00	Moore 3'; Blake 19' (pen.)	(Report)	Akinbiyi 34' 50'	Stadium: Turf Moor; Attendance: 12,981; Referee: M Jones

28 September 2004 11	Burnley	1–0	Cardiff City	Burnley
19:45	Chaplow 88'	(Report)		Stadium: Turf Moor; Attendance: 11,200; Referee: K Hill

2 October 2004 12	Reading	0–0	Burnley	Reading
15:00		(Report)		Stadium: Madejski Stadium; Attendance: 15,400; Referee: A Penn

16 October 2004 13	Ipswich Town	1–1	Burnley	Ipswich
15:00	Richards 90'	(Report)	Blake 19'	Stadium: Portman Road; Attendance: 23,138; Referee: B Curson

19 October 2004 14	Burnley	2–2	Coventry City	Burnley
19:45	Blake 65' (pen.); Branch 73'	(Report)	Johnson 62'; Barrett 70'	Stadium: Turf Moor; Attendance: 10,919; Referee: S Mathieson

22 October 2004 15	Burnley	0–2	Derby County	Burnley
19:45		(Report)	Tudgay 57'; Reich 63'	Stadium: Turf Moor; Attendance: 13,703; Referee: A Kaye

30 October 2004 16	Queens Park Rangers	3–0	Burnley	London
15:00	Gallen 13' (pen.); Santos 16'; Furlong 24'	(Report)		Stadium: Loftus Road; Attendance: 15,638; Referee: N Miller

3 November 2004 17	Leeds United	1–2	Burnley	Leeds
19:45	Wright 1'	(Report)	Roche 10'; Duffy 31'	Stadium: Elland Road; Attendance: 27,490; Referee: P Dowd

6 November 2004 18	Burnley	0–2	Ipswich Town	Burnley
15:00		(Report)	Bent 15' 65'	Stadium: Turf Moor; Attendance: 11,969; Referee: M Pike

13 November 2004 19	Burnley	1–0	Nottingham Forest	Burnley
15:00	Blake 6'	(Report)		Stadium: Turf Moor; Attendance: 11,622; Referee: M Messias

20 November 2004 20	Brighton & Hove Albion	0–1	Burnley	Brighton
15:00		(Report)	Blake 70'	Stadium: Withdean Stadium; Attendance: 6,109; Referee: K Wright

27 November 2004 21	Burnley	1–0	Millwall	Burnley
15:00	Blake 61' (pen.)	(Report)		Stadium: Turf Moor; Attendance: 11,471; Referee: E Ilderton

4 December 2004 22	Plymouth Argyle	1–0	Burnley	Plymouth
15:00	Wotton 90' (pen.)	(Report)		Stadium: Home Park; Attendance: 13,308; Referee: L Probert

11 December 2004 23	Burnley	2–0	Preston North End	Burnley
15:00	Blake 45' 85'	(Report)		Stadium: Turf Moor; Attendance: 15,318; Referee: A Leake

18 December 2004 24	Sunderland	2–1	Burnley	Sunderland
15:00	Arca 35'; Lawrence 52'	(Report)	Branch 36'	Stadium: Stadium of Light; Attendance: 27,102; Referee: D Gallagher

28 December 2004 25	Burnley	1–0	Wigan Athletic	Burnley
15:00	Branch 24'	(Report)		Stadium: Turf Moor; Attendance: 16,485; Referee: N Barry

3 January 2005 26	Stoke City	0–1	Burnley	Stoke-on-Trent
15:00		(Report)	Cahill 79'	Stadium: Britannia Stadium; Attendance: 15,689; Referee: P Joslin

15 January 2005 27	Burnley	0–0	Reading	Burnley
15:00		(Report)		Stadium: Turf Moor; Attendance: 11,392; Referee: M Jones

22 January 2005 28	Cardiff City	2–0	Burnley	Cardiff
15:00	Langley 13'; Kavanagh 74'	(Report)		Stadium: Ninian Park; Attendance: 11,562; Referee: T Kettle

5 February 2005 29	Burnley	0–1	Leeds United	Burnley
12:30		(Report)	Einarsson 66'	Stadium: Turf Moor; Attendance: 17,789; Referee: C Webster

12 February 2005 30	Coventry City	0–2	Burnley	Coventry
15:00		(Report)	Oster 64'; Moore 69'	Stadium: Highfield Road; Attendance: 13,236; Referee: S Tanner

15 February 2005 31	Crewe Alexandra	1–1	Burnley	Crewe
19:45	S. Jones 18'	(Report)	Grant 53'	Stadium: Gresty Road; Attendance: 7,718; Referee: M Atkinson

23 February 2005 32	Derby County	1–1	Burnley	Derby
19:45	Peschisolido 70'	(Report)	Valois 34'	Stadium: Pride Park Stadium; Attendance: 23,701; Referee: P Dowd

26 February 2005 33	Preston North End	1–0	Burnley	Preston
15:00	Alexander 82' (pen.)	(Report)		Stadium: Deepdale; Attendance: 18,202; Referee: G Laws

4 March 2005 34	Burnley	0–2	Sunderland	Burnley
19:45		(Report)	Lawrence 26'; Stewart 85'	Stadium: Turf Moor; Attendance: 12,103; Referee: I Williamson

8 March 2005 35	Burnley	0–0	Leicester City	Burnley
19:45		(Report)		Stadium: Turf Moor; Attendance: 10,933; Referee: A Kaye

12 March 2005 36	Burnley	2–1	Rotherham United	Burnley
15:00	Grant 11'; Sinclair 28'	(Report)	Gilchrist 4'	Stadium: Turf Moor; Attendance: 10,539; Referee: P Robinson

15 March 2005 37	Wolverhampton Wanderers	2–0	Burnley	Wolverhampton
19:45	Miller 38'; Ince 60'	(Report)		Stadium: Molineux; Attendance: 24,336; Referee: C Boyseon

19 March 2005 38	Sheffield United	2–1	Burnley	Sheffield
15:00	Quinn 29'; Gray 49'	(Report)	Akinbiyi 84'	Stadium: Bramall Lane; Attendance: 19,374; Referee: M Atkinson

2 April 2005 39	Burnley	3–1	Watford	Burnley
15:00	Bowditch 20'; O'Connor 43'; Valois 90'	(Report)	Blizzard 77'	Stadium: Turf Moor; Attendance: 11,507; Referee: M Pike

5 April 2005 40	Burnley	0–1	West Ham United	Burnley
19:45		(Report)	Sheringham 83'	Stadium: Turf Moor; Attendance: 12,209; Referee: K Friend

9 April 2005 41	Gillingham	1–0	Burnley	Gillingham
15:00	Henderson 56'	(Report)		Stadium: Priestfield Stadium; Attendance: 9,447; Referee: R Olivier

16 April 2005 42	Burnley	2–0	Brighton & Hove Albion	Burnley
15:00	Akinbiyi 23'	(Report)	Hammond 52'	Stadium: Turf Moor; Attendance: 11,611; Referee: S Mathieson

19 April 2005 43	Burnley	2–0	Queens Park Rangers	Burnley
19:45	Akinbiyi 43' 81'	(Report)		Stadium: Turf Moor; Attendance: 10,396; Referee: C Oliver

23 April 2005 44	Nottingham Forest	1–0	Burnley	Nottingham
15:00	Commons 70'	(Report)		Stadium: City Ground; Attendance: 24,165; Referee: P Walton

30 April 2005 45	Burnley	2–0	Plymouth Argyle	Burnley
15:00	Valois 87' (pen.); O'Connor 90'	(Report)		Stadium: Turf Moor; Attendance: 12,893; Referee: A Bates

8 May 2005 46	Millwall	0–0	Burnley	London
13:00		(Report)		Stadium: The New Den; Attendance: 12,171; Referee: B Curson

=== Final league position ===
Pos	Team	Pld	W	D	L	GF	GA	GD	Pts
11	Queens Park Rangers	46	17	11	18	54	58	−4	62
12	Stoke City	46	17	10	19	36	38	−2	61
13	Burnley	46	15	15	16	38	39	−1	60
14	Leeds United	46	14	18	14	49	52	−3	60
15	Leicester City	46	12	21	13	49	46	+3	57

Updated to match(es) played on 9 December 2011. Source: Football League Tables
Rules for classification: 1) points; 2) goal difference; 3) number of goals scored.

=== League Cup ===
24 August 2004 1st Round	Bury	2–3	Burnley	Bury
19:45	Mattis 12'; Challinor 18'	(Report)	Mattis 17' (o.g.); Blake 33' (pen.) 52'	Stadium: Gigg Lane; Attendance: 3,648; Referee: N Miller

21 September 2004 2nd Round	Burnley	1–1 (a.e.t.) (4–2 p)	Wolverhampton Wanderers	Burnley
19:45	Blake 50'	(Report)	Seol 45'	Stadium: Turf Moor; Attendance: 5,013; Referee: P Taylor
	Penalties
	Moore (penalty scored); Chaplow (penalty scored); Blake (penalty scored); Sinclair (penalty scored)		(penalty missed) Cort; (penalty scored) Andrews; (penalty scored) Naylor; (penalty missed) Olofinjana

26 October 2004 3rd round	Burnley	3–1	Aston Villa	Burnley
19:45	Branch 9'; Camara 65'; Valois 86'	(Report)	Ángel 81'	Stadium: Turf Moor; Attendance: 11,184; Referee: C Foy

==== 4th Round ====
9 November 2004 4th Round	Burnley	0–3	Tottenham Hotspur	Burnley
19:45		(Report)	Keane 31' 52'; Defoe 58'	Stadium: Turf Moor; Attendance: 10,639; Referee: G Poll

=== FA Cup ===
18 January 2005 3rd Round	Burnley	1–0	Liverpool	Burnley
19:45	Traoré 51' (o.g.)	(Report)		Stadium: Turf Moor; Attendance: 19,033; Referee: M Clattenburg

29 January 2005 4th Round	Burnley	2–0	Bournemouth	Burnley
15:00	Moore 17' 89'	(Report)		Stadium: Turf Moor; Attendance: 9,944; Referee: P Dowd

20 February 2005 5th Round	Burnley	0–0	Blackburn Rovers	Burnley
13:40		(Report)		Stadium: Turf Moor; Attendance: 21,468; Referee: M Dean

1 March 2005 5th Round Replay	Blackburn Rovers	2–1	Burnley	Blackburn
20:00	Tugay 31'; Pedersen 86'	(Report)	Hyde 42'	Stadium: Ewood Park; Attendance: 28,961; Referee: H Webb
