= Matthew O'Neill (footballer) =

English footballer

Personal information
- Full name: Matthew Paul O'Neill
- Date of birth: 25 June 1984 (age 42)
- Place of birth: Accrington, England
- Height: 5 ft 11 in (1.80 m)
- Position: Midfielder

Youth career
- 2000–2003: Burnley

Senior career*
Years	Team	Apps	(Gls)
2003–2005	Burnley	13	(0)
2005	→ Accrington Stanley (loan)	3	(0)
2005–2006	Accrington Stanley	3	(0)
2005	→ Radcliffe Borough (loan)	11	(1)
2006–2007	Radcliffe Borough	52	(6)
2007–2013	Ashton United		
2013	Nantwich Town		
2013–2015	Nelson	54	(7)
- * Club domestic league appearances and goals as of 09:33, 17 April 2016 (UTC)

Matthew Paul O'Neill (born 25 June 1984) is an English professional footballer who played in the Football League as a midfielder for Burnley.

== Career ==
O'Neill started his career in the youth system at Burnley, starting a three-year scholarship in 2000. His professional debut for the club came in April 2003, coming on as a substitute for Mark McGregor in a 7–4 defeat to Watford. He made his first start in a 2–0 win over Gillingham. In June 2013, O'Neill signed his first professional contract with the club on a one-year contract. In his first year as a professional, O'Neill struggled to make an impact only making four appearances. In the summer of 2004 he signed a one-year extension to his contract. In November 2004, O'Neill played his final game for the Clarets in a 2–1 win over rivals Leeds United. In February 2005, O'Neill joined Conference National side Accrington Stanley on an initial one-month loan deal, which was later extended to two months. He made his debut for the club in a 2–2 draw with Forest Green Rovers. His only goal for the club came in a 4–3 Conference League Cup win over Northwich Victoria. O'Neill returned to Burnley in May 2005 but was however released by manager Steve Cotterill due to the expiry of his contract. In July 2005, O'Neill re-joined Conference National side Accrington Stanley after training with the club during pre-season. In August 2005, O'Neill was on the move again, joining Northern Premier League Premier Division side Radcliffe Borough on loan until October 2005. In January 2006, he joined Radcliffe on a permanent basis after leaving Accrington. O'Neill stayed with Radcliffe for another season but the club struggled throughout the campaign and were relegated from the NPL Premier Division in 2007. He made a total of 85 appearances in all competitions during his time with Radcliffe scoring eleven goals. O'Neill remained in the NPL Premier Division with Ashton United after manager Danny Johnson had been impressed with his form at Radcliffe. He scored an incredible volley on his debut for the club in a 7–2 demolition of Frickley Athletic. O'Neill stayed with Ashton United for six years making over 170 appearances as they continued to compete in the NPL Premier Division. He also won the Supporters' Player of the Year award in 2010. In September 2013, he joined fellow NPL Premier Division side Nantwich Town, making his debut as a substitute in the FA Cup defeat to Rugby Town. O'Neill spent three months at Nantwich before dropping down the football pyramid to join North West Counties Football League First Division side Nelson. His debut for the club came in December 2013, in a 3–1 home win over 1874 Northwich. He finished the season with three goals in fourteen appearances for the Admirals as they were crowned champions and gained promotion to the NWCFL Premier Division.

== Personal life ==
O'Neill attended Mount Carmel RC High School in Accrington along with fellow professional footballers Joel Pilkington and Richard Chaplow. He is the brother of former Preston North End, Bury, Mansfield Town and Chester City professional footballer Joe O'Neill, and also Ed O'Neill. In March 2014, the brothers made history in the 8–1 win for Nelson over Widnes Vikings, being the first three siblings to score in the same game in the North West Counties Football League.

== Career statistics ==
Club statistics
Club	Season	League			FA Cup		League Cup		Other		Total	
Club	Season	Division	Apps	Goals	Apps	Goals	Apps	Goals	Apps	Goals	Apps	Goals
Burnley	2002–03	First Division	7	0	0	0	0	0	—		7	0
Burnley	2003–04	First Division	4	0	0	0	0	0	—		4	0
Burnley	2004–05	Championship	2	0	0	0	0	0	—		2	0
Burnley	Total		13	0	0	0	0	0	—		13	0
Accrington Stanley (loan)	2004–05	Conference National	3	0	0	0	—		1 (Note: Appearance in Conference League Cup)	1	4	1
Accrington Stanley	2005–06	Conference National	3	0	0	0	—		0	0	3	0
Accrington Stanley	Total		6	0	0	0	—		1	1	7	1
Career total			19	0	0	0	0	0	1	1	20	1

== Honours ==
Nelson

- North West Counties Football League First Division: 2013–14
