= Glen Little =

English footballer

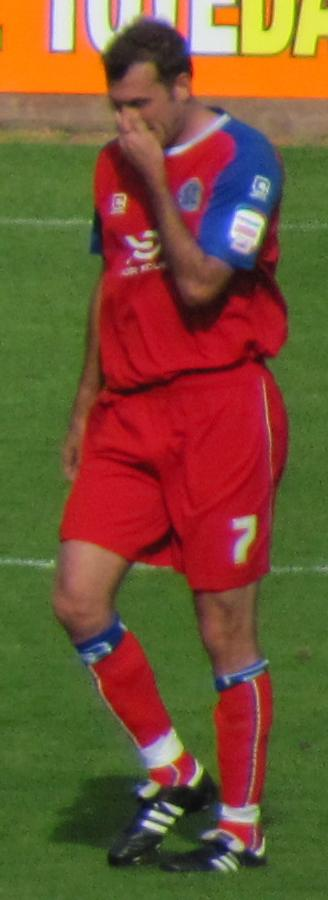

Personal information
- Full name: Glen Matthew Little
- Date of birth: 15 October 1975 (age 51)
- Place of birth: Wimbledon, London, England
- Position: Winger

Senior career*
| Years | Team | Apps | (Gls) |
| 1994–1996 | Crystal Palace | 0 | (0) |
| 1994–1995 | → Derry City (loan) | 1 | (0) |
| 1995–1997 | Glentoran | 75 | (26) |
| 1997–2004 | Burnley | 246 | (32) |
| 2003 | → Reading (loan) | 6 | (1) |
| 2003 | → Bolton Wanderers (loan) | 4 | (0) |
| 2004–2008 | Reading | 96 | (5) |
| 2008–2009 | Portsmouth | 5 | (0) |
| 2009 | → Reading (loan) | 8 | (0) |
| 2009–2010 | Sheffield United | 16 | (0) |
| 2010–2011 | Aldershot Town | 14 | (1) |
| 2011–2013 | Wrexham | 35 | (1) |
| 2013–2014 | Wealdstone | 31 | (3) |
| 2014 | Heybridge Swifts | 0 | (0) |
| 2014 | Grays Athletic | 17 | (0) |
| 2015 | Welling United | 0 | (0) |
| 2015–2016 | Grays Athletic | 25 | (0) |
| 2016–2017 | Heybridge Swifts | 26 | (2) |
| Total | | 605 | (71) |

Managerial career
- 2018–2019: Wingate & Finchley
- * Club domestic league appearances and goals

Glen Matthew Little (born 15 October 1975) is an English former footballer who played as a winger. Born in Wimbledon, London, he began his career in Northern Ireland with Derry City and Glentoran, before returning to England to play for Burnley, Reading, Bolton Wanderers, Portsmouth, Sheffield United and Aldershot Town. He finished his career in non-league football with Wrexham, Wealdstone, Grays Athletic and Heybridge Swifts.

== Career ==
=== Crystal Palace and Northern Ireland ===
Little made his Derry City debut on 20 November 1994 on loan from Palace. While at Irish League club Glentoran, Little scored a memorable goal to win the 1995–96 Irish Cup. At Glentoran Glen is regarded as one of the finest players to wear the Glentoran shirt.

=== Burnley ===
Little moved from Glentoran to Burnley in November 1996 for a £100,000 fee. After Stan Ternent's arrival at Turf Moor in summer 1998, he became a fixture in the right-wing slot, linking up especially well with full-back Dean West. In Burnley's 1999–2000 Second Division promotion season, Little scored a memorable goal at home to Bristol Rovers. He also helped Burnley beat Tottenham Hotspur in the League Cup in 2002 after a game-turning performance when brought on as a substitute. Little attracted attention during this time, and his club was reported to have turned down big money offers for his signature.

In early 2003, Little joined Reading on loan. In September 2003 he moved to Premier League club Bolton Wanderers on loan in a deal which involved Delroy Facey and Gareth Farrelly moving to Burnley. Little made his Premiership debut for the Trotters against Wolverhampton Wanderers and set up the equalising goal for Kevin Davies but his time with Sam Allardyce's team was brief.

=== Reading ===
After eight years at Burnley, Little left on a Bosman transfer to sign for Reading in the summer of 2004. Little's talents were widely regarded as one of the main reasons behind Reading's record breaking 106-point Championship lifting 2005–06 season, with Little scoring five goals and setting up fourteen, more than any other player in the league. Little started the 2006–07 season on the sidelines due to an injury sustained during the close season. Seol Ki-hyeon took Little's place in the Reading team while he was out injured, but due to an injury to Dave Kitson, Seol was pushed up front, freeing the right wing for Little to return to the starting line-up. In November 2006, Little signed a one-year extension to his contract with Reading, keeping him at the Madejski Stadium until the summer of 2008. He went on to make 24 top flight appearances in the season.

=== Portsmouth ===
Following Reading's narrow relegation in 2008, and Little's injuries leading to a lack of first team action during the 2007–08 season, he opted to sign for Portsmouth on a one-year contract, on 20 June 2008. Little played in some big European games for Portsmouth in their only European season when he played against Milan, he played a part in the first Pompey goal, passing the ball to Nwankwo Kanu who crossed the ball for Younès Kaboul to put Pompey 1–0 up. The game finished 2–2 at Fratton Park. However, he found opportunities limited at Pompey, so in March 2009 he rejoined Reading on loan until the end of the 2008–09 season. Reading, however, failed to gain promotion so Little returned to Portsmouth, where he was released at the end of the 2008–09 season playing in just one game for the FA Cup holders.

=== Sheffield United ===
In July 2009, Little had a trial with Sheffield United and subsequently signed a one-year contract at Bramall Lane. Despite this, he struggled to make an impact and made only 16 league appearances for the Blades, many as a late substitute and was released by the South Yorkshire club when his contract expired.

=== Aldershot Town ===
In July 2010, Little signed for Aldershot Town on a one-year deal. He struggled with injury during his short stay, meaning he never secured a place in the side, despite his obvious potential. He was released by new manager Dean Holdsworth on 26 January 2011.

=== Wrexham ===
In March 2011, Little joined Conference National side Wrexham on trial in the hope of earning a contract. However, due to the club's financial position and having been placed under a transfer embargo, nothing came of the initial trial.

In June, Little rejoined the Welsh club for pre season training, where he impressed in games against Aberystwyth, Rochdale and Wolves, and earned a short-term contract with the club just before the beginning of the new season. Unfortunately, he pulled a hamstring on the same day, so his debut for the club was delayed.

Little eventually made his debut for Wrexham on 10 September 2011, in a 3–1 loss at Barrow; he appeared sporadically over the first half of the 2011–12 season, usually coming on as a late substitute. Little scored his first goal for Wrexham in December 2011 in a 2–1 loss to Hinckley United in the FA Trophy.

In February 2012, Little committed himself to Wrexham signing a deal keeping him with the club until the end of the season. In the 2012–13 season, Little started well in pre-season scoring a penalty against Scottish Premier League side Kilmarnock in July 2012. Little was well prepared for the new season and scored his first league goal for the Dragons during a 2–0 win over Hyde when he tucked away a penalty after coming on as a substitute. His goal put the Reds 1–0 up before Jay Harris scored in injury time to seal the three points. In September 2012, Little picked up a slight knee injury and was not sure how long he would be on the sidelines.

On Boxing day 2012 and after three months out with his knee injury Little returned to action in a 4–1 home league win against AFC Telford United. On 24 March 2013 Little picked up only his third honour in his 18-year career, as Wrexham won the FA Trophy by beating Conference promotion rivals Grimsby Town on penalties. Little did not play in the final at Wembley Stadium but played in earlier rounds against Sutton United and was an unused substitute in other rounds against Southport and in both legs of the semi-final against Gainsborough Trinity. In May 2013 Little played at Wembley for the first time in his career as Wrexham played in the Conference National play-off final having defeated Kidderminster Harriers over the two semi-final legs which Little played a part in (coming on as a sub in the 85th minute of the second leg). Little came on as a substitute for Dean Keates in the 80th minute, unfortunately for Little, opponents Newport County scored twice in the last four minutes to secure promotion condemning Wrexham to non-League football for the sixth-straight season. The game at Wembley was Little's last in a Wrexham shirt as it was revealed on 20 May 2013 Little had been released from the Racecourse Ground, but Little stated we would like to carry on his career, despite being 37 years old.

=== Wealdstone ===
In August 2013, Little signed for Isthmian Premier League club Wealdstone to bolster their squad for another push for promotion to the Conference South. His first involvement in a Royals shirt was in a pre-season game against Uxbridge, he scored in pre-season against Hayes in a 3–2 loss. Little made his competitive debut in an Isthmian Premier League game against Wingate & Finchley. He came on as a sub in the 2–2 draw. His first start for the club came in a 7–1 win over Cray Wanderers. He picked up an injury against AFC Hornchurch on 10 September, he returned from injury appearing as an unused sub against Lewes, he then returned to action starting in The Royals' first loss of the season, 1–0 against Margate on 5 October 2013. His first goal in a royals shirt came in an FA Trophy First Qualifier Round, a competition Little had won last season with Wrexham, he scored in a 3–0 win over Leiston.

However, with his fitness regained, Little stamped his influence in the team from the end of October onwards. Coming on with his team 1-0 down at home to Grays Athletic, Little pulled all the strings in a 3–1 win, showing his true class. The team then went on a 9-game unbeaten run, largely orchestrated by Little and Tom Pett. This run included Little's first and second League goals for the club in a 4–1 win away at Dulwich Hamlet. Each time he chipped the huge Dulwich keeper, the second goal coming after a run by Little from the edge of his own area which beat six opponents.

Wealdstone' good form continued for the rest of that season and they were crowned Champions after a 1–0 away win at Margate.

=== Heybridge Swifts ===
Upon the conclusion of the 2013–14 season, Little left Wealdstone for personal reasons signing a contract at Isthmian League North side Heybridge Swifts in May 2014. Little stayed at the club for just over a month before he decided to leave after the departure of manager Jody Brown to Grays Athletic; Little did not make any appearances for the Swifts.

=== Later career ===
In July 2014 Little opted to follow manager Jody Brown to Essex-based Isthmian League Premier Division side Grays Athletic. Little left Grays in December 2014, following Jody Brown to Welling United, where he became assistant manager. Brown, however, was sacked in March 2015 by Welling and Little followed. Subsequently, Little rejoined Grays Athletic as a player/coach, before being promoted to player/assistant manager. Little later returned to Heybridge Swifts as a player/coach.

== Managerial career ==
On 8 October 2018, Little was appointed joint-manager of Wingate & Finchley, along with Nicky Shorey. On 29 October Shorey resigned, leaving Little in sole charge. Despite leading the club to their best ever performance in the FA Trophy, Little was sacked in January 2019 due to their lowly league position.

== Career statistics ==
Appearances and goals by club, season and competition
| Club | Season | League | | | National Cup | | League Cup | | Other | | Total | |
| Club | Season | Division | Apps | Goals | Apps | Goals | Apps | Goals | Apps | Goals | Apps | Goals |
|---|---|---|---|---|---|---|---|---|---|---|---|---|
| Burnley | 1996–97 | Second Division | 9 | 0 | 2 | 0 | 0 | 0 | 1 (Note: Appearance(s) in Football League Trophy) | 0 | 12 | 0 |
| Burnley | 1997–98 | Second Division | 24 | 4 | 0 | 0 | 2 | 0 | 3 | 1 | 29 | 5 |
| Burnley | 1998–99 | Second Division | 34 | 5 | 1 | 0 | 2 | 0 | 0 | 0 | 37 | 5 |
| Burnley | 1999–2000 | Second Division | 41 | 3 | 4 | 0 | 2 | 0 | 1 | 0 | 48 | 3 |
| Burnley | 2000–01 | First Division | 34 | 3 | 2 | 0 | 3 | 0 | — | | 39 | 3 |
| Burnley | 2001–02 | First Division | 37 | 9 | 2 | 1 | 1 | 0 | — | | 40 | 10 |
| Burnley | 2002–03 | First Division | 33 | 5 | 4 | 2 | 3 | 0 | — | | 40 | 7 |
| Burnley | 2003–04 | First Division | 34 | 3 | 2 | 0 | 2 | 0 | — | | 38 | 3 |
| Burnley | Total | | 246 | 32 | 17 | 3 | 15 | 0 | 5 | 1 | 283 | 36 |
| Reading (loan) | 2002–03 | First Division | 6 | 1 | 0 | 0 | 0 | 0 | 1 (Note: Appearance(s) in First Division play-offs) | 0 | 7 | 1 |
| Bolton Wanderers (loan) | 2003–04 | Premier League | 4 | 0 | 0 | 0 | 0 | 0 | — | | 4 | 0 |
| Reading | 2004–05 | Championship | 35 | 0 | 3 | 0 | 1 | 0 | — | | 39 | 0 |
| Reading | 2005–06 | Championship | 35 | 5 | 1 | 0 | 2 | 0 | — | | 38 | 5 |
| Reading | 2006–07 | Premier League | 24 | 0 | 2 | 0 | 2 | 0 | — | | 28 | 0 |
| Reading | 2007–08 | Premier League | 2 | 0 | 0 | 0 | 0 | 0 | — | | 2 | 0 |
| Reading | Total | | 96 | 5 | 6 | 0 | 5 | 0 | — | | 107 | 5 |
| Portsmouth | 2008–09 | Premier League | 5 | 0 | 0 | 0 | 0 | 0 | 3 (Note: Appearance(s) in UEFA Europa League) | 0 | 8 | 0 |
| Reading (loan) | 2008–09 | Championship | 8 | 0 | 0 | 0 | 0 | 0 | 1 (Note: Appearance(s) in Championship play-offs) | 0 | 9 | 0 |
| Sheffield United | 2009–10 | Championship | 16 | 0 | 1 | 0 | 1 | 0 | — | | 18 | 0 |
| Aldershot Town | 2010–11 | League Two | 14 | 1 | 2 | 0 | 0 | 0 | 0 | 0 | 16 | 1 |
| Wrexham | 2011–12 | Conference Premier | 17 | 0 | 2 | 0 | — | | 2 (Note: One appearance and one goal in FA Trophy, one appearance in Conference Premier play-offs) | 1 | 21 | 1 |
| Wrexham | 2012–13 | Conference Premier | 18 | 1 | 0 | 0 | — | | 4 (Note: Two appearances in FA Trophy, two appearances in Conference Premier play-offs) | 0 | 22 | 1 |
| Wrexham | Total | | 35 | 1 | 2 | 0 | — | | 6 | 1 | 43 | 2 |
| Wealdstone | 2013–14 | Isthmian League Premier Division | 31 | 3 | 1 | 0 | — | | 5 (Note: Three appearances and one goal in FA Trophy, one appearance in Isthmian League Cup, one appearance in Middlesex Senior Cup) | 1 | 37 | 4 |
| Welling United | 2014–15 | Conference Premier | 0 | 0 | — | | — | | 0 | 0 | 0 | 0 |
| Grays Athletic | 2014–15 | Isthmian League Premier Division | 21 | 0 | 2 | 1 | — | | 5 (Note: Two appearances in FA Trophy, two appearances in Isthmian League Cup, one appearance in Essex Senior Cup) | 0 | 28 | 1 |
| Grays Athletic | 2015–16 | Isthmian League Premier Division | 21 | 0 | 2 | 0 | — | | 4 (Note: Three appearances and one goal in Isthmian League Cup, one appearance in Essex Senior Cup) | 1 | 27 | 1 |
| Grays Athletic | Total | | 42 | 0 | 4 | 1 | — | | 9 | 1 | 55 | 2 |
| Heybridge Swifts | 2016–17 | Isthmian League Division One North | 26 | 2 | 2 | 0 | — | | 1 (Note: Appearance(s) in FA Trophy) | 0 | 29 | 2 |
| Career total | | | 529 | 45 | 35 | 4 | 21 | 0 | 31 | 4 | 616 | 53 |

== Honours ==
Glentoran

- Irish Cup: 1995–96

Burnley

- Football League Second Division second-place promotion: 1999–2000

Reading

- Football League Championship: 2005–06

Wrexham

- FA Trophy: 2012–13

Individual

- PFA Team of the Year: 1999–2000 Second Division
