= Mark Rasmussen =

English footballer

Personal information
- Full name: Mark Alan Rasmussen
- Date of birth: 28 November 1983 (age 42)
- Place of birth: Newcastle, England
- Position: Midfielder

Team information
- Current team: Albany Creek Excelsior

Senior career*
Years	Team	Apps	(Gls)
2001–2003	Burnley	2	(0)
2003–2004	Accrington Stanley	0	(0)
2003–2004	Gateshead	25	(2)
2004–2006	West Allotment Celtic	67	(11)
2006–2009	Newcastle Benfield	84	(27)
2009–2012	North Shields	117	(18)
2012– 2012	Hebburn Town	19	(2)
2012– 2013	Bayside United FC	20	(3)
2013– 2014	Albany Creek Excelsior FC	5	(2)
2014–	Holland Park Hawks FC	34	(3)
- * Club domestic league appearances and goals

Mark Alan Rasmussen (born 28 November 1983) is a midfielder who plays for Brisbane Premier League side Albany Creek Excelsior FC.

He started his career at Football League Championship outfit Burnley, who he joined after being spotted by scout Jack Hixon. He made his debut for the Clarets on 19 April 2003, replacing Matthew O'Neill. His second and final game for Burnley was a substitute appearance on 21 April 2003, when he replaced Gordon Armstrong. However, he was released at the end of the 2002-03 season by Stan Ternent.

He then moved to Accrington Stanley on a free transfer, but struggled to make the first team and ended up playing solely in the reserves. One year later, he moved on to non-league side Gateshead. He scored on his debut for the Tynesiders along with former Burnley teammate Anthony Shandran, but was transfer-listed straight after the match for talking to other clubs and failing to maintain a suitable level of fitness. He joined West Allotment Celtic and won the league and cup double in his first season with the club. He then joined Newcastle Benfield and was part of the league cup winning side in 2006 and who narrowly missed out on the first round of the FA Cup after a 1–0 home defeat by York City. He later moved down a division to join North Shields before moving onto Hebburn Town in the Northern League Division 1. Having moved to Brisbane, Australia, He played his first full season for Bayside United F.C in the Capital 1 League and finished runners up in 2013. A big summer transfer for Albany Creek Excelsior FC in the Brisbane Premier League took place and he awaits his debut on 22 Feb 2014.

After a short spell at Albany Creek, Mark moved to Brisbane side Holland Park Hawks in 2014 and went on to win the league and cup double. The 2015 season again saw the Hawks win the league and cup double and promotion to Brisbane's premier division.
