= Luigi Cennamo =

German-born Greek-Italian footballer

Personal information
- Full name: Luigi Cennamo
- Date of birth: February 7, 1980 (age 46)
- Place of birth: Munich, West Germany
- Height: 1.88 m (6 ft 2 in)
- Position: Goalkeeper

Team information
- Current team: Panetolikos (goalkeeping coach)

Youth career
- Iraklis
- PAOK
- AE Nea Krini

Senior career*
Years	Team	Apps	(Gls)
1997–1999	Olympiacos	0	(0)
1999–2000	Egaleo	27	(0)
2000–2001	Olympiacos	0	(0)
2001–2002	Burnley	0	(0)
2002–2003	Panegialios	24	(0)
2003–2004	Proodeftiki	14	(0)
2004–2009	Egaleo	53	(0)
2009–2010	APEP Pitsilia	25	(0)
2010–2012	Panetolikos	52	(0)
2012–2013	Maccabi Netanya	31	(0)
2013–2015	Atromitos	38	(0)
2015–2016	Skoda Xanthi	22	(0)
2016–2017	Lamia	8	(0)
2017–2018	Panetolikos	3	(0)
Total		297	(0)

Managerial career
- 2017–2019: Panetolikos (goalkeeping coach)
- 2019–2021: Olympiacos U19 (goalkeeping coach)
- 2022: Al Faisaly (goalkeeping coach)
- 2022–2023: AEL (goalkeeping coach)
- 2023–: Panetolikos (goalkeeping coach)
- * Club domestic league appearances and goals as of 3 December 2017

Luigi Cennamo (born February 7, 1980) is a retired German-born Greek-Italian footballer who played as a goalkeeper.

== Career ==
He started his career in Olympiakos as part of the first team in 1997.

He was brought to Burnley by Stan Ternent as one of three Greeks to sign for the Clarets along with goalkeeper Nikolaos Michopoulos and centre-forward Dimitrios Papadopoulos. Cennamo is half Greek/half Italian, but just to confuse matters even further he'd been born in 1980 in Munich in Southern Germany. He signed from Olympiakos on an initial six-month deal, the 21-year-old would be understudy to Nikolaos Michopoulos but was expected to offer genuine competition for the first team role. On first team days he was always named on the bench as the substitute keeper, and in December was almost called upon at Preston when it looked as though Michopoulos would be sent off. At the beginning of 2001, there were big changes for Cennamo. Firstly the club announced they had signed him from Olympiakos.

The fact that the Clarets were keen to make it permanent suggested he might have a long-term future with the club but just under two weeks later his world came crashing down, as did Burnley's hopes in the FA Cup. His club was a favourite to beat Cheltenham at Whaddon Road but after twenty minutes in the game gone, Michopoulos suffered a serious injury and Cennamo got his big chance. Five minutes after coming on he was picking the ball out of the net, and he was repeating that after another five minutes as Burnley went on to lose 2–1. His manager Stan Ternent didn't trust him to replace Michopoulos and before the next game he brought in Marlon Beresford on loan from Middlesbrough. Cennamo didn't even make the bench, in fact was never on the bench again and was released at the end of the season.

He returned to Greece and after playing for a number of clubs. He succeeded to play with top division club Egaleo for almost 5 years. He was in their squad against Middlesbrough in the UEFA Cup during the 2004/05 season.

In the season 2009/10, he moved to the Cypriot club APEP Pitsilia, having the first team role. After a year in Cyprus he returned to Greece, joining Panetolikos in Football League, helping the club to win the Championship. On August 2, 2012, Cennamo transferred to Maccabi Netanya on a free transfer from Panetolikos. It was a great year for him as he played for 38 games in all competitions.

German-born Italian goalkeeper Cennamo has signed a one-year contract for an undisclosed fee with Atromitos, the Greek Super League team announced. On March 12, 2014 Atromitos announced that after Tasos Karamanos, Nikolaos Lazaridis and Efstathios Tavlaridis, another player decided to continue with the club! The club recognized the effort, the stability, the character and the professionalism and made a formal proposal for renewal. The keeper signed a new contract lasting until 2016 in the presence of the Technical Manager Yiannis Angelopoulos. "I want to start by thanking the president Mr. George Spanos and technical director Mr. Yiannis Angelopoulos for the confidence showed to me, but above all to my coach George Paraschos who actively shows me confidence on the court." said in atromitos.fc the keeper. On 15 July 2015, after two years with the club and 42 appearances in all competitions, Atromitos announces the end of the cooperation with the player. Therefore, along with Elini Dimoutsos, has informed that are not included in the planning of the club for the next season.

On 16 June 2015, Cennamo signed a one-year contract with Xanthi. On 23 August 2015, he made his debut with the club in a 0–0 away draw against PAOK. He finished as the undisputed leader of the club's defence being the main goalie for the first half of the 2015-16 season.

On 17 August 2016, Cennamo signed a year contract with Lamia.

On 5 July 2017, he signed a year contract with Super League club Panetolikos.

== Honours ==
Individual

- Greek Best Goalkeeper of the Beta Division: 2011
