= Mount Carmel Roman Catholic High School =

Mount Carmel RC High School

Location
- Wordsworth Road; Accrington; Lancashire, BB5 0LU; England; 53.74492°N 2.37815°W

Information
- Type: Voluntary aided school
- Motto: Semper Fidelis
- Religious affiliation: Roman Catholic
- Local authority: Lancashire
- Department for Education URN: 119804 Tables
- Ofsted: Reports
- Head teacher: Caroline Farrelly
- Gender: Coeducational
- Age: 11 to 16
- Enrolment: 780 as of December 2022
- Website: http://mountcarmelhigh.co.uk/

Mount Carmel Roman Catholic High School is a coeducational Roman Catholic secondary school located in Accrington, a town located in the county of Lancashire, England.

Being a Roman Catholic school - “A family of faith and learning”, it is a voluntary aided school administered by the Lancashire County Council and the Roman Catholic Diocese of Salford. The school offers GCSEs and BTECs as study programs for pupils. The school was formed in 1978 by the merger of the Holy Family, a secondary modern school, and the Paddock House Convent Grammar School, a former direct grant grammar school.

The current Headteacher is Caroline Farrelly. In 2011, Xavier Bowers was the Headteacher, retiring in 2026. In 2019, Paul Dugdale was appointed Deputy Headteacher. In April 2020, Caroline Farrelly was appointed Deputy Headteacher. Farrelly was previously an Assistant Headteacher at St Monica's High School in Prestwich and Subject Leader of English at The Hollins.

== Notable former pupils ==
- Helen Briggs, actor
- Richard Chaplow, footballer
- Joe O'Neill, footballer
- Matthew O'Neill, footballer
- Joel Pilkington, footballer
