= Drissa Diallo =

Guinean footballer (born 1973)

Personal information
- Full name: Drissa Diallo
- Date of birth: 4 January 1973 (age 53)
- Place of birth: Nouadhibou, Mauritania
- Height: 6 ft 1 in (1.85 m)
- Position: Centre back

Senior career*
Years	Team	Apps	(Gls)
1993–1996	Sedan	31	(0)
1996–1998	Liège	49	(0)
1997–1998	→ Deinze (loan)	12	(0)
1998–2003	KV Mechelen	98	(4)
2003	Burnley	14	(1)
2003–2005	Ipswich Town	45	(0)
2005–2006	Sheffield Wednesday	11	(0)
2006–2009	Milton Keynes Dons	70	(2)
2008–2009	→ Cheltenham Town (loan)	26	(2)
2009–2010	Cheltenham Town	18	(0)
Total		374	(9)

International career
1996–2001	Guinea	8	(0)
- * Club domestic league appearances and goals

Drissa Diallo (born 4 January 1973) is a Guinean former professional footballer who most recently played for Cheltenham Town. Although he holds French nationality, he represented Guinea on eight occasions at international level.

== Career ==
After playing for Sedan, Liege and Denize, Diallo signed for KV Mechelen in 1998. In 2003 Mechelen went into liquidation and Diallo was released on a free transfer. He promptly moved to England and signed for Burnley. Although the Lancashire club were keen to sign Diallo on a long-term deal after he had impressed Stan Ternent during his time at the club, Diallo spent only 5 months in Burnley before Joe Royle swooped to sign him for Ipswich Town at the end of the season. He scored two goals for Burnley, against Fulham in the FA Cup and Gillingham in the league.

== Career statistics ==
Appearances and goals by club, season and competition
Club	Season	League			FA Cup		League Cup		Other		Total	
Club	Season	Division	Apps	Goals	Apps	Goals	Apps	Goals	Apps	Goals	Apps	Goals
Burnley	2002–03	First Division	14	1	4	1	0	0	—		18	2
Ipswich Town	2003–04	First Division	19	0	0	0	1	0	0	0	20	0
Ipswich Town	2004–05	Championship	27	0	0	0	2	0	0	0	29	0
Ipswich Town	Total		46	0	0	0	3	0	0	0	49	0
Sheffield Wednesday	2005–06	Championship	11	0	0	0	1	0	—		12	0
Milton Keynes Dons	2006–07	League Two	42	0	2	0	2	0	0	0	46	0
Milton Keynes Dons	2007–08	League Two	30	2	0	0	1	0	4 (Note: Appearances in Football League Trophy)	0	35	2
Milton Keynes Dons	2008–09	League One	0	0	0	0	1	0	0	0	1	0
Milton Keynes Dons	Total		72	2	2	0	4	0	4	0	82	2
Cheltenham Town (loan)	2008–09	League One	27	2	3	0	0	0	0	0	30	0
Cheltenham Town	2009–10	League Two	18	0	1	0	0	0	1	0	20	0
Career total			188	5	10	1	8	0	5	0	211	6

=== International ===
Appearances and goals by national team and year
National team	Year	Apps	Goals
Guinea
Guinea	1996	2	0
Guinea	1997	3	0
Guinea	1999	1	0
Guinea	2000	1	0
Guinea	2001	1	0
Total		8	0

== Honours ==
Milton Keynes Dons

- Football League Two: 2007–08
