= Lee Roche =

English footballer

Personal information
- Full name: Lee Paul Roche
- Date of birth: 28 October 1980 (age 46)
- Place of birth: Bolton, England
- Position: Defender

Youth career
- 1997–1999: Manchester United

Senior career*
Years	Team	Apps	(Gls)
1999–2003	Manchester United	1	(0)
2000–2001	→ Wrexham (loan)	41	(0)
2003–2005	Burnley	54	(2)
2005–2007	Wrexham	45	(1)
2007–2011	Droylsden	58	(0)
Total		199	(3)

International career
1998–1999	England U19	4	(0)
2000	England U21	1	(0)
- * Club domestic league appearances and goals

Lee Paul Roche (born 28 October 1980) is an English former professional footballer. He played as a right sided full-back but could also play on the right of midfield.

== Club career ==
=== Manchester United ===
Roche started his career as a trainee at Manchester United but made only one substitute appearance in the league against Newcastle United. He also started a League Cup game against Arsenal and a Champions League tie against Deportivo la Coruna. During his time with the 'Red Devils' the young full-back was loaned out to Wrexham for the 2000–01 season, and was a key member of the team for the entire season, playing in 41 of the 46 league games.

=== Burnley ===
At the end of 2003 Roche was released on a free transfer from Manchester United. Burnley were the team to take advantage of this situation with then manager Stan Ternent using his connections to the Old Trafford club to sign the promising youngster to a two-year deal.

In his first season, Roche wasn't a first team regular, despite scoring an outstanding 25-yard volley against Crystal Palace on his debut. Towards the end of the 2003–04 season though, he began to push the previous right back, Dean West out of the side. Unfortunately for Roche, Ternent's contract wasn't renewed and Steve Cotterill was appointed as the new manager at Turf Moor. Cotterill did not rate Roche as highly as Ternent had done, and brought in Mike Duff from Cheltenham Town instead. Roche still featured in the team fairly regularly though, but out of position on the right side of midfield where he looked much less comfortable. Roche scored his only other Burnley goal in a famous 2–1 victory at Elland Road against Leeds United.

=== Wrexham ===
After his two-year contract with Burnley expired, Roche returned to play for Wrexham in the summer of 2005. He scored on his second debut for the club against Boston United. At the end of the 2006–07 season Roche was released by Wrexham after a disappointing season in which they just avoided relegation to the Football Conference.

=== Later career ===
He joined Droylsden in 2007, staying with the club until February 2011.

== International career ==
Roche made one appearance for the England under-21s; he started the 2−2 draw with Finland during qualifying for the 2002 UEFA European Under-21 Championship.

== Retirement ==
Following a sequence of injuries and falling out of love with the game, Roche retired from football at age 27. He now works as a plumber and cavity wall remover and also coaches the Bury under-11 side.
