= Nikolaos Michopoulos =

Greek footballer (born 1970)

Nikos Michopoulos
Personal information
- Full name: Nikolaos Michopoulos
- Date of birth: 20 February 1970 (age 56)
- Place of birth: Karditsa, Greece
- Height: 6 ft 3 in (1.91 m)
- Position: Goalkeeper

Youth career
- 1989–1991: Apollon Larissa

Senior career*
Years	Team	Apps	(Gls)
1991–1992	Apollon Larissa		
1992–2000	PAOK	187	(0)
2000–2003	Burnley	84	(0)
2002	→ Crystal Palace (loan)	5	(0)
2003–2004	Omonia Nicosia	11	(0)
Total		287	(0)

International career
1995–2002	Greece	15	(0)
- * Club domestic league appearances and goals

Nikolaos "Nikos" Michopoulos (Greek: Νικόλαος "Νίκος" Μιχόπουλος; born 20 February 1970) is a former Greek professional football player. During his career he played for PAOK and Burnley, and a short period to Crystal Palace and Omonia Nicosia. He played as a goalkeeper and was known for his reactions and shot-stopping ability.

Michopoulos began his career at Apollon Larissa. In 1992 he joined PAOK, and made over 187 appearances for the Greek team, earning himself 15 international caps for Greece in the process. He was brought to Burnley by Stan Ternent as one of three Greeks to sign for the Clarets along with goalkeeper Luigi Cennamo and centre-forward Dimitrios Papadopoulos.

'Nik the Greek' as he became known established himself solidly as a fan-favourite at Turf Moor and became somewhat of a cult-hero. He would make almost 100 appearances for the Clarets, his last being in the farcical 7–2 home defeat to Sheffield Wednesday, when he was carried off injured in the first half and replaced by Marlon Beresford.

Michopoulos would return to his native Greece and become goalkeeping coach at his old club, PAOK, a position he still holds. In pre-season training for the 2005/06 season, Michopoulos was able to meet up with several of his old team-mates when Burnley took on PAOK at a neutral ground.
