= Mark McGregor =

English footballer (born 1977)

Personal information
- Full name: Mark Dale Thomas McGregor
- Date of birth: 16 February 1977 (age 49)
- Place of birth: Chester, England
- Height: 5 ft 10 in (1.78 m)
- Position: Defender

Senior career*
Years	Team	Apps	(Gls)
1995–2001	Wrexham	244	(11)
2001–2004	Burnley	54	(2)
2004–2006	Blackpool	59	(0)
2006–2008	Port Vale	66	(0)
2008–2009	Altrincham	42	(1)
2009–2015	Gap Connah's Quay		
2015	Cefn Druids		
2016–2017	Runcorn Town		
Total		465	(14)

Managerial career
- 2009–2015: Gap Connah's Quay (player-manager)
- * Club domestic league appearances and goals

Mark Dale Thomas McGregor (born 16 February 1977) is an English former footballer who played as a defender. He played 498 games in a 13-year career in the Football League, mostly in the third tier.

He started his career at Wrexham in 1995 and made 288 league and cup appearances in his six years for the Welsh club before he signed with Burnley. In July 2004, he moved from Burnley to Blackpool. In January 2006 he transferred to Port Vale, before joining Conference side Altrincham in August 2008. He stayed in Altrincham for one season before becoming player-manager at Gap Connah's Quay. He led the club to the Cymru Alliance title for two consecutive seasons. He returned to playing football with Cefn Druids in January 2015. He was appointed player-assistant manager of Runcorn Town in April 2016.

== Playing career ==
McGregor started as a trainee for Wrexham, signing a professional contract for the first time in July 1995. He first came to prominence in the 1995–96 season, making 33 appearances in the Second Division. He continued to be a regular feature at the Racecourse Ground, making 44 appearances in 1996–97. The youngster was a consistent first-team player for the "Dragons" by 1997–98, hitting 48 appearances in league and cup competitions. He missed just a handful of games in 1998–99, making 56 appearances. On the last day of the 1999–2000 season, he put a speculative long-range effort past Gillingham's Vince Bartram, costing the "Gills" an automatic promotion place, to the benefit of Burnley; this was the only goal of his 52 appearances that season. He was voted Wrexham's Player of the Year in 2000–01 for his performances during his 47 appearances throughout the campaign. In total, he played 288 league and cup games for Brian Flynn's side.

Despite verbally agreeing a new contract with Wrexham, he moved to First Division club Burnley on a free transfer in July 2001. He made just two appearances in the 2001–02 season under Stan Ternent, though he went on to play 37 games in 2002–03. He had surgery on his knee at the start of the 2003–04 campaign before recovering to post 26 appearances

He moved on to League One side Blackpool in July 2004, after manager Colin Hendry offered him a twelve-month deal. He played 44 games in 2004–05 and was appointed club captain. He made 25 appearances in 2005–06, scoring once in the Football League Trophy against former club Wrexham, before leaving Bloomfield Road after Simon Grayson took charge and the arrival of Marc Joseph on loan.

In January 2006, McGregor decided to move on to Martin Foyle's Port Vale. He played 14 League One games throughout the rest of the season, before featuring 35 times in an unsettled defence in 2006–07. He featured just 23 times in 2007–08, and was transfer listed by new manager Lee Sinnott in January 2008, before Sinnott released him from the club three months later, as the "Valiants" were relegated into League Two.

McGregor had an unsuccessful trial with Mansfield Town in July 2008 before he eventually dropped out of the Football League to sign for Conference club Altrincham on 27 July. Handed the number four shirt at the club, he found himself a key feature of the back four and an occasional captain, featuring 44 times for the Robins" in the 2008–09 campaign.

In January 2015, McGregor left as manager of the Nomads and just a few days later joined Welsh Premier League side Cefn Druids as a player. The "Druids" were relegated out of the division at the end of the 2014–15 season.

He was appointed player-assistant manager of North West Counties League Premier Division club Runcorn Town in April 2016.

== Style of play ==
McGregor was described in the PFA Footballers' Who's Who as a "no nonsense defender, solid in the tackle and usually in the right place to clear any danger".

== Management career ==
In August 2009, he was appointed player-manager at Welsh Premier League side Gap Connah's Quay. The 2009–10 season ended in relegation to the Cymru Alliance in 14th place, as a restructuring of the Welsh league meant six places were cut from the Premier League from 18 to 12. They finished level on points with Newtown (who avoided relegation), who finished above them on goal difference. Making 26 league and 6 cup appearances in the 2010–11 season, he managed his side to the Cymru Alliance title. However, they were not granted a promotion back to the top flight. They retained their title in 2011–12 and were promoted into the Welsh Premier League. The following season saw the "Nomads" finish eighth in the Welsh Premier League, losing out in the UEFA Europa League play-off to eventual qualifiers Bala Town. The "Nomads" finished tenth in 2013–14.

== Career statistics ==
Appearances and goals by club, season and competition
Club	Season	League			FA Cup		League Cup		Other		Total	
Club	Season	Division	Apps	Goals	Apps	Goals	Apps	Goals	Apps	Goals	Apps	Goals
Wrexham	1995–96	Second Division	33	1	6	0	0	0	3	0	42	1
Wrexham	1996–97	Second Division	38	1	5	0	1	0	0	0	44	1
Wrexham	1997–98	Second Division	42	2	3	0	2	0	1 (Note: Appearance(s) in the EFL Trophy.)	0	48	2
Wrexham	1998–99	Second Division	43	1	5	0	2	0	6	0	56	1
Wrexham	1999–2000	Second Division	45	1	5	0	2	0	0	0	52	1
Wrexham	2000–01	Second Division	43	5	1	0	2	0	1	0	47	5
Wrexham	Total		244	11	25	0	9	0	11	0	289	11
Burnley	2001–02	First Division	1	0	0	0	1	1	—		2	1
Burnley	2002–03	First Division	30	1	4	0	3	0	—		37	1
Burnley	2003–04	First Division	23	1	3	0	0	0	—		26	1
Burnley	Total		54	2	7	0	4	1	0	0	65	3
Blackpool	2004–05	League One	38	0	4	0	1	0	1	0	44	0
Blackpool	2005–06	League One	21	0	1	0	2	0	1	1	25	1
Blackpool	Total		59	0	5	0	3	0	2	1	69	1
Port Vale	2005–06	League One	14	0	—		—		—		14	0
Port Vale	2006–07	League One	32	0	1	0	2	0	0	0	35	0
Port Vale	2007–08	League One	20	0	2	0	1	0	0	0	23	0
Port Vale	Total		66	0	3	0	3	0	0	0	72	0
Altrincham	2008–09	Conference National	42	1	2	0	—		6	0	50	1
Career total (Note: Statistics in Welsh football not recorded.)			465	14	42	0	19	1	19	1	545	16

== Honours ==
Wrexham

- Wrexham A.F.C. Player of the Year: 2001

Connah's Quay Nomads

- Cymru Alliance: 2010–11 & 2011–12
