= Arthur Gnohéré =

Ivorian footballer (born 1978)

Personal information
- Full name: David Arthur Gnohéré
- Date of birth: November 20, 1978 (age 47)
- Place of birth: Yamoussoukro, Ivory Coast
- Height: 6 ft 0 in (1.83 m)
- Position: Defender

Senior career*
Years	Team	Apps	(Gls)
1997–1999	Cannes	2	(0)
1999–2001	Caen	48	(2)
2001–2004	Burnley	81	(6)
2003	→ Queens Park Rangers (loan)	6	(0)
2004–2005	Queens Park Rangers	15	(0)
2005–2006	Istres	12	(0)
2007–2008	Oxford United	8	(0)
2008–2009	Bulle	15	(0)
2009–2011	Monthey	31	(1)
Total		218	(9)
- * Club domestic league appearances and goals as of 00:00, 12 February 2011 (UTC)

David Arthur Gnohéré (born November 20, 1978) is a retired Ivorian professional footballer. His brother, Harlem, is also a footballer.

== Career ==
=== Burnley ===
Gnohéré's first taste of English football came at Lancashire club Burnley. After a successful trial period at the club, he signed a contract to be a part of Stan Ternent's squad in 2001. 'King Arthur', as he was effectively nicknamed, became a firm fans' favourite at the club with his dominant displays and his excellent runs up the field from defence.

His finest hour was in a local derby away at Preston North End. He stunned the Lilywhites with two goals, including one from a classy set up from Alan Moore. He was a constant fixture in the Burnley team during the 2001/2002 season, where Burnley looked likely to gain promotion to the Premier League.

=== Queens Park Rangers ===
Gnohéré failed to live up to his early form at Burnley in the following seasons and was subsequently released when his contract expired. He joined Queens Park Rangers after an initial loan, but left the club at the end of the 2004/05 season. During his spell at QPR, he scored once in the Football League Trophy against Kidderminster Harriers.

=== Oxford United ===
After a spell out of the game, Gnohéré signed for Oxford United in August 2007. However, after a string of poor performances for them and the return of regular defenders from injury, the club decided not to renew his month-to-month contract, and he was released in October 2007.
