= Andy Waine =

English footballer

Personal information
- Full name: Andrew Paul Waine
- Date of birth: 24 February 1983 (age 43)
- Place of birth: Manchester, England
- Position: Midfielder

Senior career*
| Years | Team | Apps | (Gls) |
| 2002–2003 | Burnley | 2 | (0) |
| 2003 | Accrington Stanley | 1 | (0) |
| 2003–2005 | Hyde United | 22 | (3) |
| Total | | 25 | (3) |
- * Club domestic league appearances and goals

Andrew Paul Waine (born 24 February 1983) is an English former professional footballer who played as a midfielder. Born in Manchester, he started his career with Burnley, and made two appearances in the Football League First Division in the 2002–03 season. He progressed through the youth ranks at Burnley having joined the club in 1999, and made his debut for the club on 19 April 2003, coming on as a substitute for Robbie Blake in the 2–0 victory over Gillingham. His second and final game for the Clarets came 4 May 2003, when he again came off the substitutes' bench in the 1–2 defeat away at Wimbledon.

He was released by Burnley in the summer of 2003, and joined local Football Conference side Accrington Stanley. He again found first-team opportunities limited and played only one league game for the side, replacing Lutel James in their 1–0 win against Scarborough on 25 August 2003. He was released by Accrington and joined Northern Premier League side Hyde United. Waine made his debut for Hyde United on 15 December 2003 against Colwyn Bay and scored his first goal for the club on his first start, in a 3–4 loss away at Witton Albion. He went on to play a total of 38 first-team games for the side, scoring three goals. He made his last appearance for the club on 5 February 2005, coming on as a substitute in Hyde's 0–3 defeat to Hereford United in the FA Trophy.
