= Anthony Bates =

English football referee

- Born: 26 September 1961 (age 65); Burslem, Stoke-on-Trent, England

Domestic
Years	League	Role
1993–1996	Football League	Asst. referee
1996–	Football League	Referee

International
Years	League	Role
1993–1996	UEFA listed	Asst. referee

Anthony Bates (born 26 September 1961) is a former English association football referee who operates in the Football League, and previously served as assistant referee for UEFA in the Euro 96 competition. He also refereed the FA Women's Cup Final in 2007. On average, Bates gave a high 4.0 cards per game in the 1998–99 season, the highest so far in his career.

== Career ==
Bates was born in Burslem, Stoke-on-Trent, Staffordshire. He became a Football League assistant referee in 1993, and took up the flag during the Charity Shield match at Wembley on 13 August 1995, when Everton beat Blackburn Rovers 1–0 courtesy of a Vinny Samways goal. He fulfilled the same role for UEFA, and ran the line in the Euro 96 group match between Germany and the Czech Republic. He was also an assistant referee for Dermot Gallagher during the 1996 FA Cup Final at Wembley on 11 May 1996, when Manchester United beat Liverpool 1–0, with Eric Cantona scoring the only goal.

Following that busy period, he was promoted to referee in the Football League for the 1996–97 season. One of his first appointments was the Third Division match between Hereford United and Doncaster Rovers at Edgar Street on 24 August 1996, when the home side won 1–0.

His only match of note during his first six years at Football League level was an old First Division play-off semi-final first leg, which he refereed on 28 April 2002. It was between Birmingham City and Millwall at St. Andrew's, and finished in a 1–1 draw. Birmingham were promoted to the Premier League after winning the Final on penalties.

In 2004, former Liverpool and Denmark international Jan Molby was sent from the dugout by referee Bates after having verbally abused the fourth official during the old Third Division match between Southend United and Kidderminster Harriers. It was played at Roots Hall on 14 February 2004, and finished 3–0 to Southend. Harriers' director of football Molby was subsequently fined £1,500 by the FA, and banned from the touchline for four matches.

After a match in Football League One between Nottingham Forest and Scunthorpe United at the City Ground on 20 August 2005, Bates attempted to take an unprecedented step regarding a yellow card he had issued to Scunthorpe's Andy Crosby during the game. Having agreed to review it, he asked the Football Association to "overturn the yellow card after viewing video evidence - but FIFA rules insist cautions may not be withdrawn", only dismissals by straight red card.

Bates was the referee in charge of an FA Cup first round tie between Newport County and Swansea City at Newport Stadium on 11 November 2006, when fourth official Alan Sheffield was struck by a coin thrown from the crowd, shortly after County manager Peter Beadle was sent from the technical area by Bates for verbal abuse of Sheffield during the game, and following a free kick given in favour of Swansea from which they scored. Newport lost 3–1. Subsequently, both Newport County and their manager received heavy punishments from the Welsh FA. County were fined £3,000 for failing to control their supporters, and Beadle received a seven-match touchline ban and was also fined £1,500.

Bates' highest honour yet was his appointment to the FA Women's Cup Final, played on 7 May 2007 at the City Ground, Nottingham. Arsenal defeated Charlton Athletic 4–1 to clinch "The Quadruple" (the winning of four competitions in one season, the others being the FA Women's Premier League, FA Women's Premier League Cup and UEFA Women's Cup).

On 22 December 2007, he refereed the 1–1 draw in the Championship between Charlton and Hull City at The Valley, and sent off Danny Mills for "foul and abusive language".

On 28 January 2008, Bates was the referee for a 0–0 draw in the Championship between Ipswich and Plymouth where the fourth official was required to replace an assistant referee, after getting caught in a collision with a player. At the interval, the public address announcer asked for "any level three officials in the ground to report to reception immediately", so that the fourth official could receive assistance in his duties.

Bates' one other appointment to a "Final" was in the Football League Trophy on 19 February 2008, when he took control of the Southern Area Final first leg at the Liberty Stadium between Swansea City and MK Dons. The winners over the two-legged decider would go on to meet the victors in the Northern equivalent at Wembley Stadium on 30 March 2008. Swansea lost 1–0 to the eventual Finalists.

== Career statistics ==
Season	Games	Yellow cards	Red cards	Average cards a game
1997–98	38	140	8	3.9
1998–99	41	160	6	4.0
1999–2000	37	121	8	3.5
2000–01	33	100	2	3.1
2001–02	38	78	4	2.2
2002–03	40	105	2	2.7
2003–04	32	92	5	3.0
2004–05	33	94	3	2.9
2005–06	36	100	7	3.0
2006–07	40	116	4	3.0
2007–08	36	85	2	2.4
2008–09	38	64	3	1.8
2009–10	36	106	1	3.0
2010–11 (In progress)	17	43	3	2.8
