= Graham Laws =

English association football referee (born 1961)

- Full name: Graham Laws
- Born: 17 August 1961 (age 65); Whitley Bay, Northumberland, England

Domestic
Years	League	Role
? –1996	Northern Premier League	Referee
1996–	Football League	Referee

Graham Laws (born 17 August 1961, in Whitley Bay, Northumberland) is an English association football referee who operates in the English Football League, and has previously been a fourth official in the Premier League. He has twice been to the Millennium Stadium, Cardiff, as referee of a Football League playoff Final and at a EFL Trophy Final.

== Career ==
Graham Laws progressed through the lower leagues to referee in the Northern Premier League, before being appointed to the English Football League list of referees in 1996.

He has been fourth official for Eddie Wolstenholme twice in big games, firstly for the FA Vase Final at Villa Park on 6 May 2001, and then in the Football League Second Division playoff Final in Cardiff on 27 May 2001.

He has been required, from time to time, to fulfil the role of fourth official in the Premier League, such as during the Newcastle versus Wigan match at St James' Park on 19 August 2006, when Martin Atkinson was the match referee.

Laws has also handled important matches involving the England national youth football team, such as their fixture against Scotland youth on 22 December 2004 at Victoria Park, Hartlepool, which finished 1–0 to England, courtesy of a David Wheater goal in the 27th minute.

On 28 April 2002, he was appointed to referee a Second Division playoff semi-final first leg match between Huddersfield and Brentford, which finished 0–0. This was followed on 2 May 2002 by a semi-final second leg tie between Millwall and Birmingham in the First Division playoffs. Birmingham won 1–0 to confirm their place in the Final, and subsequently the Premiership. Then, on 11 May 2002, he refereed the Second Division playoff Final at the Millennium Stadium, Cardiff, when Stoke City beat Brentford 2–0 to gain promotion to the First Division.

On 10 February 2004, Laws took control of the EFL Trophy Southern Final first leg contested by Colchester and Southend at Layer Road, the home side suffering a 3–2 defeat.

He was honoured with further end-of-season Playoff appointments in 2004. On 15 May 2004, he took charge of the Third Division playoff semi-final first leg at Sincil Bank between Lincoln and Huddersfield, which ended in a 2–1 away win. And he then went to the Withdean Stadium on 20 May 2004 to handle the Second Division playoff semi-final second leg between Brighton and Swindon.

Laws found it necessary to abandon the New Year's Day 2005 fixture between Burnley and Leicester City in the EFL Championship after 19 minutes because of "torrential rain". Both managers agreed he had done the right thing.

Laws was man-in-the-middle when Wrexham beat Oldham 1–0 in the Football League Trophy Northern Final second leg on 8 March 2005, to progress to the national Final, which they won.

He then returned to Lincoln City's ground on 14 May 2005 to take control of their League Two playoff semi-final first leg against Macclesfield, and they won 1–0 in progressing to the Final, which they lost.

At the end of that season, Laws handled the League One playoff semi-final first leg between Brentford and Swansea on 14 May 2006. Swansea won 2–0, but lost in the Final to Barnsley.

Australian international player Danny Tiatto was involved in allegations of racial abuse when Leicester City played Stoke City under Laws' control at the Walkers Stadium in a Championship match on 31 October 2006.

His highest appointment was to the Football League Trophy Final, contested by Bristol Rovers and Doncaster Rovers at the Millennium Stadium on 1 April 2007, when Doncaster triumphed 3–2 through an extra time goal.

He was then at Lincoln for a third time during the end-of-season playoffs, this time in a semi-final second leg encounter against Bristol Rovers in the League Two competition on 17 May 2007, which Rovers won 5–3.

On 8 December 2007, the Championship game between Sheffield Wednesday and Coventry City at Hillsborough had to be abandoned after 28 minutes play, "due to a heavily waterlogged pitch". Laws explained: "It wasn't a difficult decision to start the game. Both teams were out there warming up and I received no complaints from anyone. While it wasn't ideal conditions, I certainly didn't see any reason not to start the game."

In another Sheffield Wednesday home match, the match referee, Chris Foy, picked up a groin injury just before full-time. Laws, as fourth official, had to take over from him for the added thirty minutes. A request was also put out over the public address system for a qualified referee to assist Foy in fourth official duties during the deciding period. As it happened, no further goals were scored, and penalties were needed to resolve the tie, Derby winning this 4–2.

== Family life ==
His brother, David Laws, was also a Football League referee, from 1995 to 2003.
