= Anthony Shandran =

English footballer

Personal information
- Full name: Anthony Mark Shandran
- Date of birth: 17 September 1981 (age 45)
- Place of birth: North Shields, England
- Height: 5 ft 9 in (1.75 m)
- Position: Striker

Team information
- Current team: Bedlington Terriers

Senior career*
Years	Team	Apps	(Gls)
1999–2003	Burnley	1	(0)
2002	→ St Patrick's Athletic (loan)	?	(?)
2002	→ Stalybridge Celtic (loan)	7	(?)
2003	→ York City (loan)	18	(3)
2003–2004	Spennymoor United	13	(4)
2004	Gateshead	14	(9)
2004–2006	Newcastle Blue Star	?	(?)
2006–2007	Newcastle Benfield	1	(?)
2007–2009	Bedlington Terriers	?	(?)
2009	Blyth Spartans	7	(3)
2009–	Bedlington Terriers	202	(247)
- * Club domestic league appearances and goals

Anthony Mark Shandran (born 17 September 1981) is an English footballer, who plays for Bedlington Terriers. He plays as a striker.
