= Ray Olivier =

English football referee

- Full name: Raymond John Henry Olivier
- Born: 21 September 1958 (age 68); Sutton Coldfield, Warwickshire, England
- Other occupation: Vice Chairman Japan FA Referee Committee & Senior Manager - Refereeing Strategy

Domestic
Years	League	Role
1993-1996	Football League	Assistant referee
1996-1998	Premier League	Assistant referee
1998-2007	Football League	Referee

Raymond J. H. Olivier (born 21 September 1958) is an English former football referee, who operated in the Football League in that capacity, and in the Premier League as an assistant referee. He comes from Sutton Coldfield, Warwickshire, now in the West Midlands.

== Career ==
He began refereeing in 1980 in leagues local to his home, becoming an assistant referee in the Football League in 1993. A year later he progressed to the Premier League List of Assistants Referees, finally being elevated to the National List of Referees on Football League in 1998. He was fortunate to have officiated as a Referee, Assistant Referee or 4th Official at 88 out of 92 (current) professional clubs in England. The clubs he did not get to officiate at were Newcastle United, Hull City, Doncaster Rovers and Accrington Stanley.

His first match in charge after his promotion in 1998 was the Football League Third Division (now League Two) encounter between Exeter City and Scarborough at St James Park, Exeter on 15 August 1998, which finished 1–0 to the home side courtesy of a goal by Jon Gittens. In 2001, he refereed the FA Trophy semi-final. Other significant games he has been involved in during his career: 2006 League Two Play Off Semi Final – 4th Official, 2005 League One Play Off Semi Final – 4th Official, 2005 U18 International England v Norway – Referee, 2003 Birmingham County FA Senior Cup Final - Referee, 2001 FA Umbro Trophy Semi - Final - Referee, 1998 England "B" v Chile "B" - Assistant Referee, 1998 Intertoto Cup Kongsvinger (Norway) v F.C. Twente (the Netherlands) - Assistant Referee, 1997 GM Vauxhall Conference Spalding Cup Final - Referee, 1996 FA Umbro Trophy Final - Assistant Referee, Wembley Stadium and in 1996 U21 International Armenia v Germany - Assistant Referee.

On 1 September 2001 Olivier was appointed as a Regional Referees Manager for the Football Association. In his role as Regional Referees Manager, he has responsibility of seven County Football Associations; Birmingham, Derbyshire, Herefordshire, Nottinghamshire, Shropshire, Staffordshire and Worcestershire. The purpose of his role is to identify with County FA's and Area Training Teams in the region the current numbers and activities of referees at each level against the number of referees required to fulfill the departments aim and to follow the progress of referees in the region and provide training, development, support and encouragement. He also had National Responsibility for Referee Instructor Training. He continued to referee at Football League level whilst holding this position. In 2007, following an organisation restructuring at The Football Association, Olivier became the National Manager for the Referee Workforce. He held this position until September 2010.

During his 9 years at The Football Association, Ray Olivier has delivered training and development programs in over 25 different countries, across the six football confederations in AFC - Asian Football Confederation, CAF - Confédération Africaine de Football, CONCACAF - Confederation of North, Central American and Caribbean Association Football, CONMEBOL - Confederación Sudamericana de Fútbol, OFC - Oceania Football Confederation and UEFA - Union of European Football Associations.

In January 2006, he and Peter Walton, the Premiership referee, held a seminar on refereeing development in Guayaquil, Ecuador, for the country's senior referees, following a cooperative agreement which had been signed in 2002 by Nicolás Léoz (president of CONMEBOL), and the chairman of the FA, Geoff Thompson. As qualified as a FA Licensed Referees Instructor in 1989 he has travelled extensively in Europe, Africa, Trinidad & Tobago, Asia, Bermuda and South America delivering Senior Referee Development Programmes on behalf of The FA.

In January 2007, Olivier and Walton returned to the Ecuadorian city of Guayaquil in order to carry out an "Advanced Course for Referees' Instructors", on behalf of the Football Association and the Confederación Sudamericana de Fútbol (South American Football Confederation).

On 28 October 2006, after 33 minutes of a Notts County versus Bury Football League Two match, he was taken ill with a mild stroke, and had to be replaced by the fourth official, Jock Waugh. He was unable to referee again until Boxing Day of that year.

Ray Olivier retired from refereeing in his 49th year, handling his final Football League match on 27 April 2007 - Northampton Town v Huddersfield Town in a League One fixture before retirement from the Football League in 2007. On 5 May 2007, he was invited to referee the Muratti Vase Final between Guernsey v Jersey. Olivier has officiated in over 400 matches in the professional game as both a referee and assistant referee.

On 7 May 2007 he assisted the FA's Head of National Referee Development, Ian Blanchard in Kuala Lumpur, Malaysia, helping to run a "Referee Recruiter Course" for the Asian Football Confederation.

In November 2008, Olivier travelled with Neale Barry, Head of Senior Referee Development and Mike Riley, Premier League Referee to Brazil to run an Elite Referees Workshop. This was held at Brazil's National Training camp in the Granja Comary in Teresópolis, located 90 km (56 mi) from Rio de Janeiro.

In 2009, Olivier travelled to Colombia with Chris Foy, Premier League Referee and Dean Mohareb, Referee Development Officer at Lancashire FA to run a similar workshop to over 90 referees. After completing this workshop, he travelled on to Ecuador to deliver his 5th Referees Workshop and a two-day Match Inspectors Workshop to over 150 people accompanied by his colleague Steve Swallow, Regional Referees Manager, North West.

Olivier left the Football Association in September 2010 to take up his new position as Head of Professional Referee Development for the Professional Game Match Officials [(PGMOL)] and was responsible for the training and development of referees, assistant referees and match observers in the [(Premier League)], [(Football League)] and [(National League)]. Following a 7-year spell developing the top referees in England, Olivier left the [(PGMOL)] in June 2017 to take up a new position with the Japan Football Association as Vice Chairman, Referees' Committee and Senior Manager - Refereeing Strategy, responsible for developing key strategic infinitives for both the Top Referee Group [(TRG)] and the Referee Development Group. Japan Football Association has almost 300,000 registered referees.

In 2018, Olivier designed and delivered a 44-hour Referee Coaching Program for the full time referee managers in JFA in order to embrace a cultural new approach in referee development. The coaching concept was not only a historical change in the way referees have been trained over many years by referee instructors; it is also a change to Japanese culture and values.

Olivier has been qualified FA Licensed Referee Instructor since 1989 and has considerable experience at all levels of referee training in both in England and overseas, delivering Elite Referees courses in Bermuda, Trinidad & Tobago, Mali, Ethiopia, Denmark, Iceland, Belgium, Qatar, Asia (AFC) Kuala Lumpur, Venezuela, Peru, Brazil, Columbia, Ecuador, Fiji. Uganda, South Korea, India, Japan, Slovakia [(UAE Referees)], Czech Republic [(Saudi Arabia Referees)], [(Indonesia)] and [(Australia)].

In December 2020, Olivier finished his full-time contract with the Japan Football Association but continues to provide consultancy support on a part-time contract basis but based from the UK. He travels to Japan twice a year to conduct seminars and offer expert advice on refereeing matters. His involvement with the Asian Football Confederation [(AFC)] since 2010 has extensively been in developing their elite referee instructors and referee assessors. However, in January 2021, he became a Referee Consultant, with responsibility for developing their future elite referees in the AFC Referee Academy.
