= Barry Kilby =

English football chairman

Barry Kilby is an English businessman, chairman of Burnley Football Club from 1998 until 2012.

== Career ==
Barry Kilby founded and built Europrint Group, the largest supplier of media games (Scratch cards) in the world. The company was bought by GTECH in June 2003.

Kilby presently runs Total Gaming Solutions Ltd, a lottery management company for professional sports clubs, charities and other organisations.

Kilby set up the Barry Kilby Prostate Cancer Appeal (BKPCA) after being diagnosed with advanced prostate cancer in 2012. The charity offers a simple PSA blood test to men at football grounds throughout the UK, based on the premise that some men are reluctant to visit their doctor and are more receptive at a football match.

Kilby is married to Sonya, lives in the Ribble Valley and they have a son named Tom. Kilby also has three children from previous marriages, Johanna, Steve and James.

== Burnley F.C. ==
Kilby joined the Burnley F.C. board of directors in October 1998. He became chairman following a vote at the company's Annual General Meeting two months later. He invested £3 million into the club in a 2–1 rights issue in January 1999, which made him the club's largest single shareholder.

Barry Kilby stepped down from the position of chairman in February 2012 for health reasons. He has since been the vice-chairman.

He stepped down from the board once again in December 2020, following the takeover of the club by ALK Capital
