= Peter Walton (referee) =

English football referee

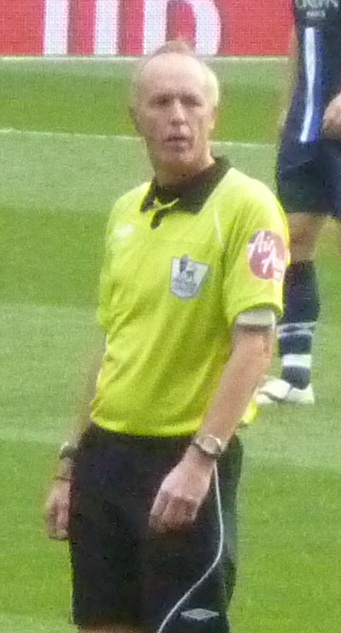
- Full name: Peter Walton
- Born: 10 October 1959 (age 67); Long Buckby, England

Domestic
Years	League	Role
1993-1994	Football League	Assistant referee
1994-1998	Premier League	Assistant referee
1998-2003	Football League	Referee
2003-2012	Premier League	Referee

International
Years	League	Role
1996-1998	FIFA listed	Assistant referee

Peter Walton (born 10 October 1959) is an English former professional football referee who officiated in the Premier League from 2003 to 2012. Beginning 2013, he was general manager of the Professional Referee Organization (PRO) in North America until being replaced by Howard Webb in January 2018.

Walton is also a former player in the United Counties League. He is based in Long Buckby, Northamptonshire, the village which he played his football for. He lists his interests as current affairs and golf.

During his professional career which spanned nearly 20 years, Walton refereed a number of notable matches, including the 2003 final of the Football League Trophy and the FA Community Shield in 2008.

== Career ==
Walton began refereeing in 1986 in local leagues. He was appointed to the assistant referees' lists of the Football League in 1993, and the Premier League in 1994.

In 1996, he was an assistant referee for the FA Cup final at Wembley Stadium, when Manchester United defeated Liverpool with a late Eric Cantona goal.

In the same year he became a FIFA assistant referee, officiating in that capacity during Euro '96 in England, notably in a group-stage match between Germany and the Czech Republic at Old Trafford, which Germany won 2–0.

Walton was promoted to the Football League list of referees in 1998. At this point, he also stepped down from the FIFA assistant referees' list.

In 2003, he was added to the Select Group of referees and took charge of the Football League Trophy final between Bristol City and Carlisle United on 6 April, with the Robins triumphing 2–0. He also refereed a Division 1 play-off semi-final second leg and a Division 3 play-off semi-final first leg at the end of the 2002-03 season.

His first Premier League appointment was a 4–3 home win by Wolverhampton Wanderers over Leicester City at Molineux Stadium on 25 October 2003.

At the end of January 2007, Walton accompanied Regional Referees' Manager Ray Olivier (a Football League referee himself) to Guayaquil, Ecuador, to undertake an Advanced Course for Referees' Instructors on behalf of the Football Association and CONMEBOL. Olivier is quoted as saying: "It is also a great fillip to have someone of Peter's calibre as part of the team and his experience of refereeing in the Premiership is invaluable to those referees taking part in this workshop."

Walton refereed the 2008 FA Community Shield match between Manchester United and Portsmouth, issuing three cautions during the game between the Premier League champions and FA Cup winners of the previous season, which United won 3–1 on penalties after extra-time.

Walton's last appointment as a Premier League referee was Everton's 2–0 home win over West Bromwich Albion on 31 March 2012. He then took up a new role as the general manager of the Professional Referee Organization (PRO) for the Football Leagues in the United States and Canada, from 2 April 2012.

Upon his appointment, Walton said to proreferees.com: "I think the referees we've got in North America are very good.

"I think the competitive nature of our leagues are very good as well and what I'm intending to do is match-up the referee abilities to that of the playing side.

"We can see great strides being taken with the league and with the infrastructure, with the players and I must make sure our referees are running parallel to that so we advance at the same pace and there isn't a gap developing or developed."

Walton currently works as a referee analyst for BT Sport's coverage of the UEFA Champions League, discussing key decisions and explaining the usage of VAR, both in-game and post-match. During the 2019 Champions League semi-final second leg between Tottenham and Ajax, a celebrating Walton, in his BT studio, was inadvertently broadcast in the midst of the dramatic scenes following Tottenham's late winning goal. Walton also regularly appears on ESPN FC.

== Card statistics ==
Season	Games	Total (yellow card)	(yellow card) per game	Total (red card)	(red card) per game
1998/99	32	99	3.09	8	0.25
1999/00	31	86	2.77	4	0.13
2000/01	37	102	2.76	7	0.19
2001/02	35	113	3.23	13	0.37
2002/03	45	129	2.87	8	0.18
2003/04	31	64	2.06	4	0.13
2004/05	31	87	2.81	2	0.06
2005/06	42	126	3.00	6	0.14
2006/07	40	128	3.20	4	0.10
2007/08	41	123	3.00	5	0.12
2008/09	43	97	2.25	4	0.09
2009/10	36	91	2.53	6	0.16
2010/11	33	110	3.33	9	0.27
2011/12	22	68	3.09	2	0.09

== See also ==
- List of football referees
