= Dean West =

English footballer (born 1972)

Personal information
- Full name: Dean West
- Date of birth: 5 December 1972 (age 53)
- Place of birth: Morley, England
- Height: 5 ft 10 in (1.78 m)
- Position: Right back

Team information
- Current team: Lincoln City (Youth Team coach)

Youth career
- ?–1991: Lincoln City

Senior career*
Years	Team	Apps	(Gls)
1991–1995	Lincoln City	119	(20)
1993–1994	→ Boston United (loan)	6	(5)
1995–1999	Bury	110	(8)
1999–2004	Burnley	158	(5)
2004	Lincoln City	4	(0)
2004–2005	Boston United	24	(0)
2005–2008	King's Lynn	119	(3)
2008–2011	Corby Town		
2011–2012	Lincoln Moorlands Railway	5	(0)
2012–	Stamford	0	(0)
- * Club domestic league appearances and goals

Dean West (born 5 December 1972) is an English former professional footballer. He is now a coach for Lincoln City youth team and centre of excellence. He is best known as a right sided full-back, but can also play in midfield if needed. Throughout his career, West has been known as a committed and dedicated full back who loves to overlap with the winger in front of him and get forward at every opportunity.

== Career ==
=== Lincoln City ===
West began his career as a trainee at Lincoln City where he graduated to the first team after undergoing his youth training. West would play for The Imps between 1991 and 1995, making 119 league appearances and scoring an impressive 20 goals.

=== Bury ===
The young right-back began to put in some excellent displays and was spotted by Stan Ternent the manager of Bury who would sign him in exchange for Kevin Hulme in September 1995. West became very popular with the fans at Gigg Lane and made the right-back slot his own, helping Bury to rapid promotion up to the First Division and making over 100 appearances for the club.

=== Burnley ===
It was at the end of the 1997/98 season when Ternent left Bury to become manager of Burnley, a club he had played for and had deep emotional ties to. In 1999, West followed Ternent, signing for Burnley on a free transfer under the Bosman ruling. West was initially very impressive and won over the Clarets' faithful with a series of excellent performances, culminating in his winning 11 of the 15 player of the season awards, handed out by Burnley supporters' clubs across the country, at the end of the 2001–2002 season.

=== Lincoln City (second spell) ===
He moved back to the club he had begun his footballing career at – Lincoln City, but failed to make any impression, starting just four games before being used in a player exchange deal.

=== Boston United ===
West made the move to local rivals Boston United. He played for Boston up until the end of the 2004–2005 season after which he was released.

=== King's Lynn ===
He subsequently joined King's Lynn where he spent three seasons making a total of 143 appearances (119 in the league), scoring three times.

=== Corby Town ===
In July 2008 he joined Corby Town.

In May 2007, West made a return to Turf Moor to play in the testimonial of his former teammate Graham Branch.

=== Lincoln Moorlands Railway ===
In July 2011 Dean joined up with former Lincoln City teammate Danny George as Player-Assistant Manager of Lincoln Moorlands Railway, with George being Player-Manager.

=== Stamford ===
Dean relinquished his duties as Lincoln Moorlands Railway manager during the summer of 2012, joining Stamford as a player & coach reforming his partnership with Graham Drury following recent seasons as player & coach at Corby Town.

== Personal life ==
A few months before his Boston United contract ended, West made the bold decision of venturing into business buying a children's nursery.

In an interview with www.football-league.co.uk, Dean said: "We needed something sustainable that was going to work. We looked at a nursing home but a nursery came up about six or seven miles from our house and it was a reasonable price. It wasn't doing too well, but we took it.

"We had never run a business before, and had never owned a nursery, but we gave it a good go and we had it for seven years – we have just sold it."

== Honours ==
Bury

- Football League Second Division: 1996–97
