= Alan Moore (footballer) =

Irish footballer

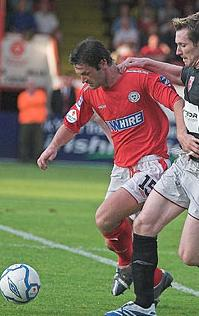

Personal information
- Full name: Alan Moore
- Date of birth: 25 November 1974 (age 51)
- Place of birth: Dublin, Ireland
- Position: Left midfielder

Youth career
- Rivermount FC

Senior career*
Years	Team	Apps	(Gls)
1991–2001	Middlesbrough	118	(14)
1998	→ Barnsley (loan)	5	(0)
2001–2004	Burnley	69	(4)
2004–2007	Shelbourne	45	(4)
2007	Derry City	4	(0)
2008	Sligo Rovers	10	(0)
Total		251	(22)

International career
1991	Republic of Ireland U17	2	(0)
1996	Republic of Ireland	8	(0)
- * Club domestic league appearances and goals

Alan Moore (born 25 November 1974) is an Irish retired footballer.

== Club career ==
Moore moved to Derry City after a short spell without a club, as he had left Shelbourne in January 2007 when his contract was up.

His previous clubs included Burnley, Barnsley and Middlesbrough. During his time at Middlesbrough, he was once described as "the Ryan Giggs of the north-east".

Moore returned home to Ireland during the summer of 2004 and signed for Shelbourne where he had an immediate impact on the team. In the UEFA Champions League qualifiers he scored away to KR Reykjavik to help secure a 2–2 draw that would see the team progress on away goals and in the Second Round he scored both home and away against Hajduk Split who Shelbourne knocked out 4–3 on aggregate. Shelbourne were eventually knocked out by Deportivo La Coruña in the last round before the group stages.

By the end of 2004, Moore had helped Shelbourne retain the League of Ireland Premier Division title for the first time. In 2006, Moore won another League of Ireland championship medal as the Dublin side pipped Derry City to the title on goal difference.

Despite this, however, on 5 March 2007, Moore signed for Derry City to work with his former manager, Pat Fenlon once again.

However, he failed to settle at Derry City and he signed for Sligo Rovers in February 2008 In July 2008 Moore, retired from the game after failing to recover from a back injury. In October 2008 he joined Jim Crawford as assistant caretaker manager at Shamrock Rovers.

Moore recently swapped being the Youth Team manager at Carlisle United FC to become a coach at Preston's Cardinal Newman College.

== International career ==
Moore played at every age group for his national team and won 8 senior caps for the Republic of Ireland.

== Honours ==
Middlesbrough

- Football League First Division: 1994–95; runner-up: 1997–98
- Football League Cup runner-up: 1996–97

Shelbourne

- League of Ireland: 2004, 2006
