= Joel Pilkington =

English footballer

Personal information
- Full name: Joel Thomas Pilkington
- Date of birth: 1 August 1984 (age 42)
- Place of birth: Accrington, England
- Position: Midfielder

Senior career*
Years	Team	Apps	(Gls)
2003–2005	Burnley	2	(0)
2005	Hyde United	0	(0)
2005–2007	Mossley	79	(2)
2007–2008	Chorley	?	(?)
2008–2009	Clitheroe	?	(?)
2009	Runcorn Linnets	?	(?)
2009–2014	Ramsbottom United	182	(?)
2015	Nelson		
- * Club domestic league appearances and goals

Joel Thomas Pilkington (born 1 August 1984) is an English former footballer who played as a midfielder. He made four substitute appearances in the Football League whilst playing for Burnley.

For the 2015–16 North West Counties Football League season he signed for Premier Division side Nelson, after coming out of retirement following an achilles injury.
