= Stan Ternent =

English football player and manager (born 1946)

Personal information
- Full name: Francis Stanley Ternent
- Date of birth: 16 June 1946 (age 80)
- Place of birth: Gateshead, England
- Position: Midfielder

Senior career*
Years	Team	Apps	(Gls)
1966–1968	Burnley	5	(0)
1968–1974	Carlisle United	188	(5)
1974	Sunderland	0	(0)
Total		193	(5)

Managerial career
- 1979–1980: Blackpool
- 1989–1991: Hull City
- 1995–1998: Bury
- 1998–2004: Burnley
- 2004–2005: Gillingham
- 2008: Huddersfield Town
- * Club domestic league appearances and goals

Francis Stanley Ternent (born 16 June 1946) is an English former footballer and manager. He managed Blackpool, Hull City, Bury, Burnley, Gillingham and Huddersfield Town. He was a scout for Hull City until January 2017. As a manager, he won three promotions between 1996 and 2000, including two in succession (from Division Three to Division One) with Bury. The other came with Burnley in 1999–2000.

== Playing career ==
Born in Gateshead, Ternent signed as an apprentice for Burnley after being spotted by scout Jack Hixon. Ternent found first team opportunities limited at Burnley and was transferred to Second Division Carlisle United, where he gained a reputation as a hard tackling midfielder. Carlisle won promotion to the First Division at the end of the 1973–74 season, but Ternent had suffered a serious knee injury earlier that season. Despite an attempted comeback with Sunderland the following season, Ternent was forced to retire from playing later in 1974, at the age of 28.

== Managerial career ==
Upon retiring, he became a coach at Sunderland, firstly, then Blackpool, assisting Bob Stokoe. Ternent himself became manager of the Tangerines in 1979, his first such role, and Blackpool's sixth manager in a decade.

Immediately upon his appointment at Bloomfield Road, Ternent began to reshape the team, spending large sums on new players. Jack Ashurst was purchased from Sunderland for a then-club-record £132,400. Fellow newcomers included Dave Bamber, Colin Morris, Peter Noble and Tom McAlister. Despite the fresh faces, the Seasiders' fortunes did not improve, and by early 1980 they were in the bottom half of the Third Division. Ternent was sacked on 1 February 1980, at the time becoming the club's shortest-serving manager in their history.

He was part of the coaching staff at Bradford City and served as assistant manager to Steve Coppell at Crystal Palace before his next role as manager came nine years later, at Hull City from 1989 to 1991. He lost his job in January 1991, a few months before the club suffered relegation from the Second Division. From 1991 to 1993 he was assistant manager to Ian Porterfield and then David Webb at Chelsea before again being made redundant.

Ternent was not out of the game for long. He moved from the Premier League to Division Three in a matter of weeks, becoming Mike Walsh's assistant at Bury. When Walsh quit in October 1995, Ternent moved up to the manager's seat, and seven months later he took them to Division Two as the third-placed team in Division Three. A year later they won the Division Two championship and survived the first season in Division One; however, Ternent left Gigg Lane at the end of the 1997–98 season to take charge of Burnley in Division Two.

Ternent inherited a club in chaos after the ill-fated tenure of Chris Waddle, and a major clearout ensued. Despite a number of heavy defeats, Ternent gained the support of the new owner and chairman, Barry Kilby, and finished the season with an unbeaten run of eleven games to finish in 15th position. Ternent's second season as Burnley manager, 1999–2000 saw the club finishing as runners-up, securing automatic promotion. Over the next two seasons under Ternent, Burnley became an established Division One club, achieving consecutive 7th-place finishes. The next two seasons were rather more disappointing as the collapse of ITV Digital hit the club's finances, and despite reaching the FA Cup quarter finals in 2003, the club's board did not renew his contract after the 2003–04 campaign. At the end of his final game against Sunderland, an emotional Ternent took a lap of honour around Turf Moor to a standing ovation from the Burnley supporters.

Ternent made a brief comeback in 2004–05 with Gillingham, taking Ronnie Jepson from Burnley to be his assistant; however, his short-term contract as manager was not renewed, as despite a heroic attempt at survival they were relegated to League One. Ternent quit Gillingham in May 2005.

In November 2007, he was appointed to the backroom staff of new Derby County manager Paul Jewell. He left this role on 24 April 2008 to take up the reins at Huddersfield Town in place of Andy Ritchie, who had been relieved of his duties at the beginning of the month. Ex-Town player Ronnie Jepson, appointed on the same day, became his assistant. He officially started his new job on 28 April, leaving Gerry Murphy in charge of Town's last home game against Walsall on 26 April and their last away game at Luton Town on 3 May.

Backed by a large budget, Ternent signed Keigan Parker, Jim Goodwin, Andy Butler, Chris Lucketti, Michael Flynn, Gary Roberts and David Unsworth during the opening weeks of 2008–09 pre-season. On 4 November, Ternent left the Galpharm Stadium after just over six months in charge of the Terriers. To date, that is the second-shortest reign of any permanent manager in Huddersfield Town's history.

In September 2009 he became a scout for Sunderland. In September 2012, Ternent was appointed as Chief Recruitment Officer for Hull. He left the club in January 2017, following the sacking of head coach Mike Phelan.

== Personal life ==
In January 2007, Ternent faced assault charges after being accused of headbutting a man at Burnley Cricket Club in August 2006. He was cleared in September 2007. His defence included a statement by Manchester United manager Sir Alex Ferguson.

== Managerial statistics ==
Team	Country	From	To	Record				
Team	Country	From	To	G	W	L	D	Win %
Blackpool	(England)	19 September 1979	1 February 1980	22	5	10	7	22.7
Hull City	(England)	8 November 1989	31 January 1991	62	19	28	15	30.6
Bury	(England)	4 September 1995	2 June 1998	149	60	44	45	40.3
Burnley	(England)	2 June 1998	3 June 2004	312	122	108	82	39.1
Gillingham	(England)	7 December 2004	21 May 2005	25	7	7	11	28.0
Huddersfield Town	(England)	28 April 2008	4 November 2008	18	5	8	5	27.8

== Honours ==
=== As a player ===
Carlisle United

- Football League Second Division promotion: 1973–74

=== As a manager ===
Bury

- Football League Second Division: 1996–97
- Football League Third Division promotion: 1995–96

Burnley

- Football League Third Division promotion: 1999–2000
