= 1986–87 Burnley F.C. season =

English football club season

Burnley
1986–87 season
- Chairman: Frank Teasdale
- Manager: Brian Miller
- Division Four: 22nd
- League Cup: 1st Round
- FA Cup: 1st Round
- Football League Trophy: 1st Round
- Top goalscorer: League: Leighton James (10); All: Leighton James (12)
- Highest home attendance: 15,696 v Orient (9 May 1987)
- Lowest home attendance: 1,465 v Bolton Wanderers (16 December 1986)
- Average home league attendance: 3,342

The 1986–87 season was Burnley's second season in the fourth tier of English football. They were managed by Brian Miller in the first season of his second spell in charge.

This season was the worst-ever Burnley season, finishing 22nd at Fourth Division (near to be relegated to Football Conference, avoiding relegation by 1 point), and knocked-out in first round in both national cups (FA Cup and League Cup).

== Appearances and goals ==
No.	Pos	Nat	Player	Total		Division Four		League Cup		FA Cup		FL Trophy	
No.	Pos	Nat	Player	Apps	Goals	Apps	Goals	Apps	Goals	Apps	Goals	Apps	Goals
	MF	(Scotland) SCO	Ian Britton	43	3	37+2	3	2+0	0	1+0	0	1+0	0
	FW	(Northern Ireland) NIR	Mark Caughey	8	0	8+0	0	0+0	0	0+0	0	0+0	0
	DF	(England) ENG	Ray Deakin	52	0	46+0	0	2+0	0	1+0	0	3+0	0
	FW	(England) ENG	Phil Devaney	9	1	8+1	1	0+0	0	0+0	0	0+0	0
	FW	(England) ENG	Wayne Entwistle	10	2	6+2	2	1+1	0	0+0	0	0+0	0
	DF	(England) ENG	Joe Gallagher	45	3	41+0	3	2+0	0	1+0	0	1+0	0
	MF	(England) ENG	Neil Grewcock	40	9	35+1	9	1+0	0	1+0	0	2+0	0
	DF	(England) ENG	Peter Hampton	36	0	33+0	0	2+0	0	1+0	0	0+0	0
	DF	(England) ENG	Jason Hardy	1	0	0+1	0	0+0	0	0+0	0	0+0	0
	MF	(England) ENG	Jason Harris	6	0	4+0	0	0+0	0	0+0	0	2+0	0
	DF	(England) ENG	Darren Heesom	17	0	13+0	0	0+0	0	0+1	0	3+0	0
	MF	(England) ENG	Ashley Hoskin	46	9	38+2	8	2+0	0	1+0	0	3+0	1
	MF	(Wales) WAL	Leighton James	47	12	42+0	10	2+0	2	1+0	0	2+0	0
	DF	(England) ENG	Steve Kennedy	3	0	3+0	0	0+0	0	0+0	0	0+0	0
	DF	(England) ENG	Peter Leebrook	33	0	30+0	0	0+0	0	0+0	0	3+0	0
	MF	(England) ENG	Phil Malley	39	3	33+0	3	2+0	0	1+0	0	2+1	0
	FW	(England) ENG	Phil Murphy	18	7	12+3	5	0+0	0	0+0	0	3+0	2
	GK	(England) ENG	Joe Neenan	51	0	45+0	0	2+0	0	1+0	0	3+0	0
	FW	(England) ENG	Derrick Parker	28	6	24+0	5	2+0	0	1+0	0	1+0	1
	FW	(England) ENG	Robert Regis	5	1	3+1	1	0+0	0	0+1	0	0+0	0
	DF	(England) ENG	Billy Rodaway	50	2	44+0	2	2+0	0	1+0	0	3+0	0
	DF	(England) ENG	Michael Southern	1	0	0+0	0	0+0	0	0+0	0	1+0	0
	GK	(England) ENG	Tony Woodworth	1	0	1+0	0	0+0	0	0+0	0	0+0	0

== Matches ==
=== Football League Division Four ===
Key

- In Result column, Burnley's score shown first
- H = Home match
- A = Away match
- pen. = Penalty kick
- o.g. = Own goal

Results

Date	Opponents	Result	Goalscorers	Attendance
23 August 1986	Torquay United (A)	1–1	Parker 80'	2,144
30 August 1986	Scunthorpe United (H)	1–0	James 25' (pen.)	3,008
6 September 1986	Hereford United (A)	0–2		2,796
13 September 1986	Hartlepool United (H)	1–1	Entwistle 71'	2,465
16 September 1986	Swansea City (H)	1–1	Entwistle 13'	2,775
20 September 1986	Wolverhampton Wanderers (A)	1–0	Grewcock 30'	5,786
27 September 1986	Halifax Town (H)	3–0	Parker (2) 47', 69', Hoskin 49'	3,296
30 September 1986	Tranmere Rovers (A)	1–2	Britton 75'	2,017
4 October 1986	Preston North End (H)	1–4	James 88' (pen.)	5,974
11 October 1986	Aldershot (A)	0–2		2,061
18 October 1986	Stockport County (H)	2–0	Matthewson 19' (o.g.), Regis 85'	2,410
22 October 1986	Northampton Town (A)	2–4	James 60', Hoskin 84'	5,718
25 October 1986	Exeter City (A)	0–3		3,198
1 November 1986	Peterborough United (H)	0–0		2,229
4 November 1986	Colchester United (H)	2–1	Grewcock 29', Hoskin 43'	1,696
8 November 1986	Cambridge United (A)	1–3	James 62' (pen.)	2,572
22 November 1986	Lincoln City (H)	3–1	James 11', Rodaway 43', Murphy 61'	2,177
28 November 1986	Southend United (A)	1–2	Gallagher 44'	3,309
13 December 1986	Orient (A)	0–2		2,413
19 December 1986	Cardiff City (H)	1–3	Hoskin 65'	1,717
26 December 1986	Wrexham (A)	2–2	Parker 64', Murphy 71'	4,568
27 December 1986	Crewe Alexandra (H)	4–0	Murphy 16', Hoskin 47', James 67', Malley 76'	2,560
1 January 1987	Rochdale (H)	0–3		4,217
3 January 1987	Lincoln City (A)	1–2	Murphy 15'	2,343
24 January 1987	Hereford United (H)	0–6		1,961
31 January 1987	Hartlepool United (A)	2–2	Malley 10', Grewcock 40'	1,506
6 February 1987	Swansea City (A)	2–2	Murphy 29', Hoskin 58'	6,015
14 February 1987	Wolverhampton Wanderers (H)	2–5	James 15', Grewcock 22'	2,947
21 February 1987	Halifax Town (A)	2–2	James 62', Grewcock 81'	1,735
28 February 1987	Tranmere Rovers (H)	2–2	Grewcock 33', Rodaway 40'	2,394
4 March 1987	Peterborough United (A)	1–1	Grewcock 60'	4,304
7 March 1987	Exeter City (H)	0–0		1,792
13 March 1987	Stockport County (A)	1–0	Hoskin 16'	2,500
17 March 1987	Northampton Town (H)	2–1	Hoskin 39', Gallagher 70'	2,691
21 March 1987	Aldershot (H)	0–1		2,690
28 March 1987	Preston North End (A)	1–2	Parker 75'	10,716
4 April 1987	Cambridge United (H)	0–2		1,874
10 April 1987	Colchester United (A)	0–1		2,635
14 April 1987	Torquay United (H)	2–2	Britton 63', James 90' (pen.)	2,718
18 April 1987	Rochdale (A)	2–0	Devaney 13', Gallagher 53'	5,739
20 April 1987	Wrexham (H)	0–0		4,090
25 April 1987	Cardiff City (A)	0–1		2,003
28 April 1987	Scunthorpe United (A)	1–2	Malley 4'	1,770
2 May 1987	Southend United (H)	2–1	James 29', Grewcock 50'	3,991
4 May 1987	Crewe Alexandra (A)	0–1		4,175
9 May 1987	Orient (H)	2–1	Grewcock 45', Britton 48'	15,696

=== Final league position ===
Pos	Team	Pld	W	D	L	GF	GA	GD	Pts	Promotion or relegation
20	Tranmere Rovers	46	11	17	18	54	72	−18	50	
21	Rochdale	46	11	17	18	54	73	−19	50	
22	Burnley	46	12	13	21	53	74	−21	49	
23	Torquay United	46	10	18	18	56	72	−16	48	
24	Lincoln City (R)	46	12	12	22	45	65	−20	48	Relegation to the Football Conference

(R) Relegated

=== FA Cup ===
Date	Round	Opponents	Result	Goalscorers	Attendance
15 November 1986	Round 1	Telford United (A)	0–3		4,145

=== League Cup ===
Date	Round	Opponents	Result	Goalscorers	Attendance
26 August 1986	Round 1 First leg	Rochdale (A)	1–1	James 12'	1,937
2 September 1986	Round 1 Second leg	Rochdale (H)	1–3	James 70' (pen.)	2,605

=== Football League Trophy ===
Date	Round	Opponents	Result	Goalscorers	Attendance
9 December 1986	Group Stage	Blackpool (A)	3–2	Hoskin 3', Murphy (2) 36', 83'	1,448
16 December 1986	Group Stage	Bolton Wanderers (H)	0–2		1,465
27 January 1987	Round 1	Bolton Wanderers (A)	1–2	Parker 56'	3,698
