= 1987–88 Burnley F.C. season =

English football club season

Burnley
1987–88 season
- Chairman: Frank Teasdale
- Manager: Brian Miller
- Division Four: 10th
- League Cup: 2nd Round
- FA Cup: 1st Round
- Football League Trophy: Runners-up
- Top goalscorer: League: George Oghani (14); All: George Oghani (19)
- Highest home attendance: 15,680 v Preston North End (12 April 1988)
- Lowest home attendance: 2,677 v Rochdale (24 November 1987)
- Average home league attendance: 6,282

The 1987–88 season was Burnley's third season in the fourth tier of English football. They were managed by Brian Miller in his second full season in charge.

== Appearances and goals ==
No.	Pos	Nat	Player	Total		Division Four		League Cup		FA Cup		FL Trophy	
No.	Pos	Nat	Player	Apps	Goals	Apps	Goals	Apps	Goals	Apps	Goals	Apps	Goals
	MF	(Scotland) SCO	Ian Britton	42	4	29+3	4	1+0	0	0+1	0	7+1	0
	MF	(England) ENG	Paul Comstive	57	11	44+0	8	4+0	1	1+0	0	8+0	2
	MF	(England) ENG	Peter Daniel	33	1	26+0	1	2+0	0	1+0	0	4+0	0
	DF	(England) ENG	Steve Davis	41	5	33+0	5	1+0	0	0+0	0	7+0	0
	DF	(England) ENG	Ray Deakin	48	3	37+0	3	3+0	0	1+0	0	7+0	0
	FW	(England) ENG	Phil Devaney	5	0	0+4	0	0+0	0	0+0	0	0+1	0
	MF	(England) ENG	Andy Farrell	58	5	45+0	3	4+0	1	1+0	0	8+0	1
	DF	(England) ENG	Steve Gardner	54	0	41+1	0	3+0	0	1+0	0	8+0	0
	MF	(England) ENG	Neil Grewcock	41	2	28+4	0	4+0	0	1+0	0	4+0	2
	MF	(England) ENG	Ashley Hoskin	32	2	15+9	1	0+1	0	0+1	0	4+2	1
	MF	(Wales) WAL	Leighton James	24	0	19+0	0	2+0	0	1+0	0	1+1	0
	DF	(England) ENG	Peter Leebrook	26	0	22+0	0	4+0	0	0+0	0	0+0	0
	MF	(England) ENG	Phil Malley	11	0	6+2	0	1+0	0	0+0	0	1+1	0
	DF	(England) ENG	Shaun McGrory	22	1	16+0	1	2+0	0	0+0	0	3+1	0
	FW	(England) ENG	George Oghani	48	19	36+1	14	4+0	2	1+0	0	6+0	3
	GK	(Wales) WAL	Chris Pearce	59	0	46+0	0	4+0	0	1+0	0	8+0	0
	FW	(England) ENG	Dave Reeves	19	9	16+0	8	1+0	0	0+0	0	2+0	1
	FW	(England) ENG	Steve Taylor	54	6	38+4	6	3+0	0	1+0	0	8+0	0
	DF	(England) ENG	Peter Zelem	15	1	9+1	1	2+0	0	1+0	0	2+0	0

== Matches ==
=== Football League Division Four ===
Key

- In Result column, Burnley's score shown first
- H = Home match
- A = Away match
- pen. = Penalty kick
- o.g. = Own goal

Results

Date	Opponents	Result	Goalscorers	Attendance
15 August 1987	Colchester United (H)	0–3		5,419
22 August 1987	Newport County (A)	1–0	Oghani 65'	2,016
29 August 1987	Carlisle United (H)	4–3	Zelem 3', Oghani 5', Deakin 30', Taylor 75'	5,781
1 September 1987	Leyton Orient (A)	1–4	Farrell 80'	3,560
5 September 1987	Swansea City (H)	1–0	Oghani 90'	4,787
11 September 1987	Tranmere Rovers (A)	1–0	Comstive 90'	4,209
15 September 1987	Wrexham (H)	1–0	Farrell 75'	5,650
19 September 1987	Cambridge United (H)	0–2		5,789
26 September 1987	Rochdale (A)	1–2	Oghani 60'	4,655
29 September 1987	Crewe Alexandra (H)	0–0		5,408
3 October 1987	Scarborough (A)	0–1		4,782
10 October 1987	Hartlepool United (H)	1–0	Comstive 52'	5,216
17 October 1987	Exeter City (A)	2–1	Oghani (2) 22' (pen.), 54'	2,780
20 October 1987	Scunthorpe United (H)	1–1	Taylor 57'	6,353
24 October 1987	Torquay United (A)	3–1	Britton 36', Comstive 54', Taylor 76'	2,836
31 October 1987	Stockport County (H)	1–1	Davis 43'	6,642
3 November 1987	Halifax Town (A)	1–2	Taylor 22'	3,419
7 November 1987	Wolverhampton Wanderers (A)	0–3		10,002
21 November 1987	Bolton Wanderers (H)	2–1	Britton 53', Reeves 68'	7,544
28 November 1987	Peterborough United (A)	0–5		3,394
12 December 1987	Hereford United (H)	0–0		4,217
19 December 1987	Cardiff City (A)	1–2	Davis 47'	3,401
26 December 1987	Rochdale (H)	4–0	Oghani 10', Farrell 43', Comstive 44', Britton 67'	7,013
28 December 1987	Darlington (A)	2–4	Reeves (2) 3', 59'	3,325
1 January 1988	Carlisle United (A)	4–3	Oghani 18', Wright 45' (o.g.)	4,260
2 January 1988	Tranmere Rovers (H)	1–1	Comstive 88'	7,401
9 January 1988	Newport County (H)	2–0	Reeves 51', Comstive 87'	5,256
16 January 1988	Cambridge United (A)	0–2		2,146
2 February 1988	Wrexham (A)	3–1	Bowden 67' (o.g.), Hoskin 78', Oghani 90'	1,821
6 February 1988	Swansea City (A)	0–0		3,498
13 February 1988	Darlington (H)	2–1	Reeves (2) 13', 89'	6,440
19 February 1988	Colchester United (A)	1–0	Reeves 32'	2,520
27 February 1988	Scarborough (H)	0–1		7,645
1 March 1988	Crewe Alexandra (A)	1–0	Gage 88' (o.g.)	3,720
5 March 1988	Exeter City (H)	3–0	Davis 35', Reeves 57', Taylor 74'	6,052
12 March 1988	Hartlepool United (A)	1–2	Oghani 64'	2,893
18 March 1988	Stockport County (A)	0–2		4,423
22 March 1988	Leyton Orient (H)	2–0	Oghani (2) 14' (pen.), 63'	5,842
2 April 1988	Wolverhampton Wanderers (H)	0–3		10,386
4 April 1988	Bolton Wanderers (A)	1–2	Oghani 35'	9,921
8 April 1988	Halifax Town (H)	3–1	Davis 44', Comstive 58', Taylor 66'	5,833
23 April 1988	Scunthorpe United (A)	1–1	Britton 76'	5,347
30 April 1988	Peterborough United (H)	1–2	Comstive 29' (pen.)	6,315
2 May 1988	Hereford United (A)	1–2	Deakin 7'	2,304
4 May 1988	Torquay United (H)	1–0	McGrory 7'	5,075
7 May 1988	Cardiff City (H)	1–2	Oghani 84'	8,421

=== Final league position ===
Pos	Team	Pld	W	D	L	GF	GA	GD	Pts
8	Leyton Orient	46	19	12	15	85	63	+22	69
9	Colchester United	46	19	10	17	47	51	−4	67
10	Burnley	46	20	7	19	57	62	−5	67
11	Wrexham	46	20	6	20	69	58	+11	66
12	Scarborough	46	17	14	15	56	48	+8	65

=== FA Cup ===
Date	Round	Opponents	Result	Goalscorers	Attendance
14 November 1987	Round 1	Bolton Wanderers (H)	0–1		10,788

=== League Cup ===
Date	Round	Opponents	Result	Goalscorers	Attendance
18 August 1987	Round 1 First leg	Wrexham (A)	0–1		2,301
25 August 1987	Round 1 Second leg	Wrexham (H)	3–0	Comstive 76', Oghani 80' (pen.), Farrell 89'	3,788
22 September 1987	Round 2 First leg	Norwich City (H)	1–1	Oghani 7'	7,912
7 October 1987	Round 2 Second leg	Norwich City (A)	0–1		6,168

=== Football League Trophy ===
Date	Round	Opponents	Result	Goalscorers	Attendance
27 October 1987	Group Stage	Tranmere Rovers (A)	2–1	Oghani 4', Grewcock 68'	1,801
24 November 1987	Group Stage	Rochdale (H)	3–2	Grewcock 7', Reeves 43', Farrell 77'	2,677
19 January 1988	Round 1	Chester City (H)	1–0	Oghani 80'	3,436
9 February 1988	Northern Quarter Final	Bury (A)	1–0	Comstive 37' (pen.)	4,672
8 March 1988	Northern Semi Final	Halifax Town (H)	0–0 (a.e.t.) (5 – 3p)		10,222
12 April 1988	Northern Final First Leg	Preston North End (H)	0–0		15,680
19 April 1988	Northern Final Second Leg	Preston North End (A)	3–1 (a.e.t.)	Oghani 32', Hoskin 93', Comstive 117'	17,592 (5,000 away)
29 May 1988	Final	Wolverhampton Wanderers (N)	0–2		80,841 (48,000 Wolves, 33,000 Burnley)
