= 1988–89 Burnley F.C. season =

English football club season

Burnley
1988–89 season
- Chairman: Frank Teasdale
- Manager: Brian Miller (until January 1989); Frank Casper (from January 1989)
- Division Four: 16th
- League Cup: Second round
- FA Cup: First round
- Football League Trophy: First round
- Top goalscorer: League: Brendan O'Connell (13); All: Brendan O'Connell (18)
- Highest home attendance: 14,036 v Luton Town (11 October 1988)
- Lowest home attendance: 3,478 v Hartlepool United (29 November 1988)
- Average home league attendance: 7,062

The 1988–89 season was Burnley's fourth season in the fourth tier of English football. They also competed in the FA Cup, League Cup and League Trophy. They were initially managed by Brian Miller until Frank Casper took charge in January 1989.

== Season overview ==
The league campaign started well with three wins on the bounce including a 6–0 home win against York City. After October Burnley's league form dropped. A couple wins in January and few later on left Burnley at the end of the season in 16th place. In the FA Cup Burnley played at home against Chester City of Division Three, but lost 2–0. In the League Cup, first they knocked out Rochdale over two legs, but then lost to Luton Town in the next round over the two legs.

== Competitions ==
=== Football League Forth Division ===
==== Table ====
Pos	Team	Pld	W	D	L	GF	GA	GD	Pts
14	Torquay United	46	17	8	21	45	60	−15	59
15	Hereford United	46	14	16	16	66	72	−6	58
16	Burnley	46	14	13	19	52	61	−9	55
17	Peterborough United	46	14	12	20	52	74	−22	54
18	Rochdale	46	13	14	19	56	82	−26	53

==== Results ====
Date	Opponents	Result	Goalscorers	Attendance
27 August 1988	Rochdale (H)	2–1	Comstive 15', Farrell 46'	7,511
3 September 1988	Halifax Town (A)	2–1	Comstive 33', O'Connell 76'	4,071
10 September 1988	York City (H)	6–0	Atkinson 17', Britton 24', Comstive (2) 47' (pen.), 87', Oghani 56', O'Connell 70'	7,258
16 September 1988	Stockport County (A)	0–0		6,676
20 September 1988	Torquay United (A)	0–2		3,021
24 September 1988	Colchester United (H)	2–0	Rowell 43', O'Connell 53'	7,177
1 October 1988	Darlington (A)	1–1	O'Connell 84'	3,409
4 October 1988	Rotherham United (H)	1–0	Oghani 74'	9,290
8 October 1988	Exeter City (H)	3–0	Oghani 32', Zelem 71', O'Connell 88'	7,894
15 October 1988	Peterborough United (A)	0–3		5,023
22 October 1988	Leyton Orient (H)	2–2	Comstive 21' (pen.), O'Connell 70'	8,503
25 October 1988	Carlisle United (A)	0–0		4,543
29 October 1988	Cambridge United (H)	2–0	Oghani 9', O'Connell 83'	8,669
5 November 1988	Scunthorpe United (A)	1–2	O'Connell 81'	6,358
8 November 1988	Lincoln City (H)	1–4	Comstive 30' (pen.)	8,445
12 November 1988	Scarborough (A)	0–1		5,258
26 November 1988	Doncaster Rovers (A)	0–1		2,724
3 December 1988	Hartlepool United (H)	0–0		6,289
17 December 1988	Hereford United (A)	0–0		2,442
26 December 1988	Wrexham (H)	1–3	O'Connell 39'	9,174
31 December 1988	Grimsby Town (H)	1–0	Oghani 88'	7,367
2 January 1989	Tranmere Rovers (A)	1–2	Britton 79'	7,974
14 January 1989	Halifax Town (H)	2–1	Oghani (2) 9', 67'	8,298
21 January 1989	Rochdale (A)	1–2	Farrell 40'	5,812
28 January 1989	Stockport County (H)	1–0	Britton 64'	8,942
4 February 1989	Torquay United (H)	1–0	O'Connell 79'	6,626
10 February 1989	Colchester United (A)	2–2	White (2) 13', 15' (pen.)	3,831
18 February 1989	Exeter City (A)	0–3		3,672
25 February 1989	Peterborough United (H)	1–1	Measham 73'	6,853
4 March 1989	Leyton Orient (A)	0–3		3,944
11 March 1989	Scunthorpe United (H)	0–1		6,813
14 March 1989	Cambridge United (A)	1–2	White 63'	2,555
18 March 1989	York City (A)	0–0		3,164
21 March 1989	Carlisle United (H)	0–0		5,283
25 March 1989	Tranmere Rovers (H)	2–2	Comstive (2) 56', 90'	6,839
27 March 1989	Wrexham (A)	2–4	Grewcock 5', McGrory 68'	3,956
1 April 1989	Hereford United (H)	3–3	James (2) 12' (pen.), 72' (pen.), Monington 85'	5,534
4 April 1989	Crewe Alexandra (H)	1–0	Hardy 33'	5,677
8 April 1989	Grimsby Town (A)	0–1		4,856
15 April 1989	Darlington (H)	0–1		5,577
22 April 1989	Rotherham United (A)	1–3	Farrell 31'	5,726
29 April 1989	Doncaster Rovers (H)	3–0	O'Connell (2) 7', 85', Comstive 88'	4,211
1 May 1989	Lincoln City (A)	3–2	White (2) 26', 73', O'Connell 40'	3,594
6 May 1989	Hartlepool United (A)	2–2	Farrell 8', James 75' (pen.)	2,038
9 May 1989	Crewe Alexandra (A)	0–4		3,597
13 May 1989	Scarborough (H)	0–1		6,206

=== FA Cup ===
Date	Round	Opponents	Result	Goalscorers	Attendance
19 November 1988	Round 1	Chester City (H)	0–2		8,474

=== League Cup ===
Date	Round	Opponents	Result	Goalscorers	Attendance
30 August 1988	Round 1 First leg	Rochdale (A)	3–3	O'Connell 19', Comstive 54' (pen.), Oghani 80'	3,669
6 September 1988	Round 1 Second leg	Rochdale (H)	2–1	O'Connell (2) 16', 53'	6,674
27 September 1988	Round 2 First leg	Luton Town (A)	1–1	Comstive 42' (pen.)	6,282
11 October 1988	Round 2 Second leg	Luton Town (H)	0–1		14,036

=== Football League Trophy ===
Date	Round	Opponents	Result	Goalscorers	Attendance
22 November 1988	Group Stage	York City (A)	2–0	O'Connell 8', Comstive 60' (pen.)	1,648
29 November 1988	Group Stage	Hartlepool United (H)	3–0	Davis 8', White 57', O'Connell 76'	3,478
17 January 1989	Round 1	Crewe Alexandra (H)	1–1 (a.e.t.) (2 – 4p)	Macowat 57' (o.g.)	6,392

== Appearances and goals ==
No.	Pos	Nat	Player	Total		Division Four		League Cup		FA Cup		FL Trophy	
No.	Pos	Nat	Player	Apps	Goals	Apps	Goals	Apps	Goals	Apps	Goals	Apps	Goals
	MF	(England) ENG	Paul Atkinson	20	1	13+1	1	3+0	0	1+0	0	2+0	0
	MF	(Scotland) SCO	Ian Britton	45	3	36+1	3	4+0	0	0+1	0	3+0	0
	MF	(England) ENG	Paul Comstive	46	12	37+1	9	4+0	2	1+0	0	3+0	1
	MF	(England) ENG	Peter Daniel	18	0	14+0	0	4+0	0	0+0	0	0+0	0
	DF	(England) ENG	Steve Davis	44	1	37+0	0	3+0	0	1+0	0	3+0	1
	DF	(England) ENG	Ray Deakin	16	0	14+0	0	2+0	0	0+0	0	0+0	0
	MF	(England) ENG	Andy Farrell	44	4	35+1	4	4+0	0	1+0	0	3+0	0
	DF	(England) ENG	Steve Gardner	52	0	44+0	0	4+0	0	1+0	0	3+0	0
	MF	(England) ENG	Neil Grewcock	13	1	12+1	1	0+0	0	0+0	0	0+0	0
	DF	(England) ENG	Jason Hardy	17	1	16+1	1	0+0	0	0+0	0	0+0	0
	FW	(England) ENG	Stuart Hooper	1	0	0+1	0	0+0	0	0+0	0	0+0	0
	MF	(England) ENG	Ashley Hoskin	5	0	2+3	0	0+0	0	0+0	0	0+0	0
	MF	(Wales) WAL	Leighton James	20	3	14+4	3	1+0	0	0+0	0	1+0	0
	FW	(England) ENG	David Jones	4	0	4+0	0	0+0	0	0+0	0	0+0	0
	DF	(England) ENG	Shaun McGrory	20	1	12+7	1	0+0	0	1+0	0	0+0	0
	DF	(England) ENG	Ian Measham	34	1	30+0	1	0+0	0	1+0	0	3+0	0
	DF	(England) ENG	Dave Miller	4	0	4+0	0	0+0	0	0+0	0	0+0	0
	DF	(England) ENG	Mark Monington	8	1	6+2	1	0+0	0	0+0	0	0+0	0
	MF	(England) ENG	Tony Morley	6	0	5+0	0	0+0	0	0+0	0	1+0	0
	FW	(England) ENG	Brendan O'Connell	51	18	42+1	13	4+0	3	1+0	0	3+0	2
	FW	(England) ENG	George Oghani	45	8	37+0	7	4+0	1	1+0	0	3+0	0
	GK	(Wales) WAL	Chris Pearce	47	0	39+0	0	4+0	0	1+0	0	3+0	0
	FW	(England) ENG	Gary Rowell	20	1	8+10	1	2+0	0	0+0	0	0+0	0
	FW	(England) ENG	Steve Taylor	4	0	0+3	0	0+0	0	0+0	0	0+1	0
	MF	(England) ENG	Winston White	38	6	30+5	5	0+0	0	1+0	0	2+0	1
	DF	(England) ENG	Peter Zelem	11	1	8+1	1	1+0	0	0+0	0	0+1	0
