= 1985–86 Burnley F.C. season =

English football club season

Burnley
1985–86 season
- Chairman: Frank Teasdale
- Manager: Martin Buchan (until October 1985); Tommy Cavanagh (from October 1985)
- Division Four: 14th
- League Cup: First round
- FA Cup: Second round
- Football League Trophy: Group Stage
- Top goalscorer: League: Alan Taylor (16); All: Alan Taylor (21)
- Highest home attendance: 4,279 v Northampton Town (17 August 1985)
- Lowest home attendance: 1,138 v Darlington (13 March 1986)
- Average home league attendance: 3,204

The 1985–86 season was Burnley's first season in the fourth tier of English football. They were initially managed by Martin Buchan until October 1985, when he was replaced by Tommy Cavanagh as manager.

== Appearances and goals ==
No.	Pos	Nat	Player	Total		Division Four		League Cup		FA Cup		FL Trophy	
No.	Pos	Nat	Player	Apps	Goals	Apps	Goals	Apps	Goals	Apps	Goals	Apps	Goals
	FW	(England) ENG	Wayne Biggins	14	5	12+0	4	2+0	1	0+0	0	0+0	0
	MF	(England) ENG	Brian Chippendale	8	0	6+2	0	0+0	0	0+0	0	0+0	0
	DF	(England) ENG	Ray Deakin	52	3	46+0	3	2+0	0	2+0	0	2+0	0
	MF	(England) ENG	Peter Devine	41	4	31+6	2	0+1	0	1+0	2	1+1	0
	FW	(England) ENG	Neil Edwards	1	0	0+1	0	0+0	0	0+0	0	0+0	0
	MF	(England) ENG	Neil Grewcock	44	7	36+2	7	2+0	0	2+0	0	2+0	0
	DF	(England) ENG	Peter Hampton	44	1	39+1	1	2+0	0	0+0	0	2+0	0
	DF	(England) ENG	Peter Haddock	7	0	7+0	0	0+0	0	0+0	0	0+0	0
	GK	(Wales) WAL	Phil Harrington	2	0	2+0	0	0+0	0	0+0	0	0+0	0
	DF	(England) ENG	Darren Heesom	28	1	23+2	1	0+0	0	2+0	0	1+0	0
	DF	(Northern Ireland) NIR	Jim Heggarty	41	1	33+3	1	2+0	0	2+0	0	1+0	0
	DF	(England) ENG	Kevin Hird	45	8	39+0	7	2+0	1	2+0	0	2+0	0
	MF	(England) ENG	Rick Holden	1	0	0+1	0	0+0	0	0+0	0	0+0	0
	MF	(England) ENG	Ashley Hoskin	22	2	17+2	2	0+0	0	2+0	0	1+0	0
	FW	(England) ENG	Andy Kilner	5	0	2+3	0	0+0	0	0+0	0	0+0	0
	FW	(England) ENG	Les Lawrence	23	7	16+5	6	0+0	0	0+0	0	2+0	1
	MF	(England) ENG	Phil Malley	49	3	43+0	2	2+0	0	2+0	1	2+0	0
	GK	(England) ENG	Joe Neenan	42	0	36+0	0	2+0	0	2+0	0	2+0	0
	DF	(England) ENG	Vince Overson	32	0	28+0	0	2+0	0	0+0	0	2+0	0
	DF	(England) ENG	Geoff Palmer	14	0	11+0	0	2+0	0	1+0	0	0+0	0
	FW	(England) ENG	Derrick Parker	21	6	19+0	5	0+0	0	2+0	1	0+0	0
	GK	(England) ENG	Dennis Peacock	8	0	8+0	0	0+0	0	0+0	0	0+0	0
	MF	(England) ENG	Mark Rhodes	4	0	3+1	0	0+0	0	0+0	0	0+0	0
	MF	(England) ENG	Andy Robinson	5	1	5+0	1	0+0	0	0+0	0	0+0	0
	FW	(England) ENG	Alan Taylor	51	21	44+1	16	2+0	3	2+0	0	2+0	2

== Matches ==
=== Football League Division Four ===
Key

- In Result column, Burnley's score shown first
- H = Home match
- A = Away match
- pen. = Penalty kick
- o.g. = Own goal

Results

Date	Opponents	Result	Goalscorers	Attendance
17 August 1985	Northampton Town (H)	3–2	Hird 12', Biggins (2) 28', 44'	4,279
23 August 1985	Stockport County (H)	0–1		3,909
26 August 1985	Port Vale (H)	1–2	Taylor 23'	3,995
31 August 1985	Aldershot (A)	2–0	Taylor (2) 62', 68'	1,744
7 September 1985	Hartlepool United (H)	2–0	Biggins 37', Heggarty 89'	3,175
14 September 1985	Hereford United (A)	2–2	Malley 18', Hird 65' (pen.)	3,411
17 September 1985	Preston North End (A)	0–1		5,585
21 September 1985	Rochdale (H)	1–0	Biggins 1'	4,241
28 September 1985	Peterborough United (A)	0–0		3,700
1 October 1985	Colchester United (H)	0–2		3,424
5 October 1985	Chester City (A)	0–4		2,974
12 October 1985	Swindon Town (H)	0–2		3,022
19 October 1985	Crewe Alexandra (A)	1–3	Taylor 48'	1,998
22 October 1985	Torquay United (H)	3–0	Hird 14' (pen.), Taylor (2) 31', 88'	2,295
26 October 1985	Halifax Town (A)	2–2	Parker 19', Grewcock 86'	2,334
2 November 1985	Southend United (H)	1–3	Robinson 44'	2,673
5 November 1985	Mansfield Town (H)	2–1	Taylor 44', Hird 67'	2,020
9 November 1985	Cambridge United (A)	4–0	Hird 1', Parker 28', Devine 29', Taylor 35'	1,917
23 November 1985	Exeter City (H)	3–1	McNichol 14' (o.g.), Hird (2) 50' (pen.), 81' (pen.)	2,893
30 November 1985	Scunthorpe United (A)	1–1	Hoskin 8'	2,001
14 December 1985	Orient (H)	1–0	Taylor 23'	3,007
20 December 1985	Stockport County (A)	1–1	Heesom 79'	3,472
26 December 1985	Tranmere Rovers (A)	1–2	Taylor 44'	3,188
1 January 1986	Wrexham (H)	5–2	Taylor 27', Deakin 32', Grewcock 50', Parker (2) 58', 75'	4,106
3 January 1986	Southend United (A)	3–2	Taylor (2) 65', 77', Deakin 66'	2,619
18 January 1986	Northampton Town (A)	0–2		3,095
25 January 1986	Hereford United (H)	3–2	Taylor (2) 5', 56', Lawrence 72'	3,936
1 February 1986	Hartlepool United (A)	1–3	Lawrence 56'	3,359
4 February 1986	Torquay United (A)	0–2		1,335
24 February 1986	Port Vale (A)	1–1	Lawrence 86'	3,030
1 March 1986	Peterborough United (H)	1–1	Paris 50' (o.g.)	2,676
8 March 1986	Chester City (H)	1–0	Lawrence 70'	3,742
11 March 1986	Aldershot (H)	1–2	Grewcock 19'	2,675
15 March 1986	Swindon Town (A)	1–3	Lawrence 44'	7,311
18 March 1986	Rochdale (A)	0–1		2,406
22 March 1986	Halifax Town (H)	1–3	Hampton 15'	3,326
29 March 1986	Wrexham (A)	1–0	Hoskin 41'	2,057
31 March 1986	Tranmere Rovers (H)	3–1	Grewcock (2) 34', 89', Malley 67'	3,132
5 April 1986	Mansfield Town (A)	0–0		3,678
12 April 1986	Cambridge United (H)	1–1	Grewcock 87'	2,796
15 April 1986	Crewe Alexandra (H)	0–1		1,988
19 April 1986	Exeter City (A)	2–0	Taylor 20', Parker 47'	2,019
22 April 1986	Preston North End (H)	1–1	Deakin 49'	3,835
26 April 1986	Scunthorpe United (H)	1–2	Grewcock 20'	2,542
3 May 1986	Orient (A)	0–3		1,995
6 May 1986	Colchester United (A)	2–2	Lawrence 62', Devine 89'	2,726

=== Final league position ===
Pos	Team	Pld	W	D	L	GF	GA	GD	Pts	Promotion or relegation
12	Crewe Alexandra	46	18	9	19	54	61	−7	63	
13	Wrexham	46	17	9	20	68	80	−12	60	Qualification for the European Cup Winners' Cup first round
14	Burnley	46	16	11	19	60	65	−5	59	
15	Scunthorpe United	46	15	14	17	50	55	−5	59	
16	Aldershot	46	17	7	22	66	74	−8	58	

=== FA Cup ===
Date	Round	Opponents	Result	Goalscorers	Attendance
16 November 1985	Round 1	Nuneaton Borough (A)	3–2	Malley 15', Devine (2) 44', 89'	4,500
7 December 1985	Round 2	Rotherham United (A)	1–4	Parker 47'	4,264

=== League Cup ===
Date	Round	Opponents	Result	Goalscorers	Attendance
20 August 1985	Round 1 First leg	Bury (H)	2–1	Taylor 10', Biggins 82'	3,303
3 September 1985	Round 1 Second leg	Bury (A)	3–5	Taylor (2) 25', 85', Hird 40'	3,762

=== Football League Trophy ===
Date	Round	Opponents	Result	Goalscorers	Attendance
21 January 1986	Group Stage	Chesterfield (A)	2–1	Lawrence 25', Taylor 46'	1,053
13 March 1986	Group Stage	Darlington (H)	1–1	Taylor 13'	1,138
