= 1988 Associate Members' Cup final =

1988 Associate Members' Cup Final
- Event: 1987–88 Associate Members' Cup
Burnley	Wolverhampton Wanderers
0	2
- Date: 29 May 1988
- Venue: Wembley Stadium, London
- Man of the Match: Floyd Streete (Wolves)
- Referee: Roger Milford (Somerset)
- Attendance: 80,841

The 1988 Associate Members' Cup Final, known as the Sherpa Van Trophy Final for sponsorship reasons, was the 5th final of the domestic football cup competition for teams from the Third and Fourth Divisions.

The final was played at Wembley Stadium in London on 29 May 1988, The game was contested by Burnley and Wolverhampton Wanderers before a crowd of 80,841, a then record for the trophy, which was not bettered until the 2019 final between Sunderland and Portsmouth. Wolves won the match 2–0 thanks to goals in either half by Andy Mutch and Robbie Dennison.

== Background ==
The match took place three weeks after the end of the domestic league programme. Wolves had already won the Fourth Division title in their second ever season at that level, and boasted the division's top goalscorer in Steve Bull (34 league goals; 52 in total). Burnley had finished tenth in the division and would take four further seasons before being promoted. Wolves had won both league games between the two clubs that season 3–0.

It was the first time in the cup's history that two previous English champions met in the final, and Wolves were the first of the former champions to have won the trophy.

In a further twist of irony, Burnley and Wolves had contested the English league title between the two of them only twenty-eight years previously, Burnley emerging as champions on the final day of the 1959–60 season by a point (denying Wolves, FA Cup winners that season, the first English League and Cup 'double' of the 20th Century.)

== Match details ==
29 May 1988
15:00 BST

Burnley	0–2	Wolverhampton Wanderers
		Mutch 23'; Dennison 51'

Wembley Stadium, London
Attendance: 80,841
Referee: Roger Milford (Somerset)

Burnley	Wolverhampton Wanderers

GK	1	(England) Chris Pearce
RB	2	(England) Peter Daniel
LB	3	(England) Ray Deakin (c)
CM	4	(Scotland) Ian Britton
CB	5	(England) Steve Davis	Booked
CB	6	(England) Steve Gardner
RM	7	(England) Andy Farrell
CF	8	(England) George Oghani
CF	9	(England) Steve Taylor
CM	10	(England) Paul Comstive
LM	11	(England) Shaun McGrory		(substituted off) 61'
Substitutes:
DF	12	(England) Ashley Hoskin
MF	14	(Wales) Leighton James		(substituted on) 61'
Manager:
(England) Brian Miller

GK	1	(Wales) Mark Kendall
RB	2	(England) Gary Bellamy
LB	3	(England) Andy Thompson
CB	4	(England) Floyd Streete
CB	5	(Scotland) Ally Robertson (c)		(substituted off) 47'
CM	6	(England) Phil Robinson
RM	7	(Northern Ireland) Robbie Dennison
CM	8	(England) Keith Downing	Booked
CF	9	(England) Steve Bull
CF	10	(England) Andy Mutch
LM	11	(England) Micky Holmes		(substituted off) 45'
Substitutes:
MF	12	(Wales) Nigel Vaughan		(substituted on) 45'
FW	14	(England) Jackie Gallagher		(substituted on) 47'
Manager:
(England) Graham Turner

MATCH OFFICIALS

- Assistant referees:
  - Dennis Palmer (Avon)
  - Graham Butland (Chelmsford)
- Reserve referee: Michael Peck (Kendal)

MATCH RULES

- 90 minutes.
- 30 minutes of extra-time if necessary.
- Penalty shoot-out if scores still level.
- Two named substitutes
- Maximum of two substitutions.

== Road to Wembley ==
=== Burnley ===
Northern Section Group 1	Tranmere Rovers	1–2	Burnley
Northern Section Group 1	Burnley	3–2	Rochdale
Northern Section First Round	Burnley	1–0	Chester City
Northern Section Quarter-finals	Bury	0–1	Burnley
Northern Section Semi-final	Burnley	0–0	Halifax Town
	Burnley won 5–3 on Penalties		
Northern Section Final 1st Leg	Burnley	0–0	Preston North End
Northern Section Final 2nd Leg	Preston North End	1–3	Burnley

=== Wolverhampton Wanderers ===
Southern Section Group 1	Swansea City	1–1	Wolverhampton Wanderers
Southern Section Group 1	Wolverhampton Wanderers	3–1	Bristol City
Southern Section First Round	Wolverhampton Wanderers	4–0	Brentford
Southern Section Quarter-finals	Wolverhampton Wanderers	4–0	Peterborough United
Southern Section Semi-final	Wolverhampton Wanderers	1–0	Torquay United
Southern Section Final 1st Leg	Notts County	1–1	Wolverhampton Wanderers
Southern Section Final 2nd Leg	Wolverhampton Wanderers	3–0	Notts County
