= Chris Pearce (footballer) =

Welsh footballer

Personal information
- Full name: Christopher Leslie Pearce
- Date of birth: 7 August 1961 (age 65)
- Place of birth: Newport, Wales
- Height: 6 ft 0 in (1.83 m)
- Position: Goalkeeper

Youth career
- Wolverhampton Wanderers

Senior career*
| Years | Team | Apps | (Gls) |
| 1979–1982 | Blackburn Rovers | 0 | (0) |
| 1980 | → Rochdale (loan) | 5 | (0) |
| 1981 | → Barnsley (loan) | 0 | (0) |
| 1982–1983 | Rochdale | 36 | (0) |
| 1983–1986 | Port Vale | 48 | (0) |
| 1986–1987 | Wrexham | 25 | (0) |
| 1987–1992 | Burnley | 181 | (0) |
| 1992–1993 | Bradford City | 9 | (0) |
| 1993–199? | Chorley | | |
| 199?–199? | Fleetwood Town | | |
| 199?–1995 | Accrington Stanley | | |
| 1995–1996 | Rossendale United | | |
| Total | | 304+ | (0) |
- * Club domestic league appearances and goals

Christopher Leslie Pearce (born 7 August 1961) is a Welsh former footballer. A goalkeeper, he made 304 league appearances in a 14-year career in the Football League.

A former Wolverhampton Wanderers apprentice, he turned professional at Blackburn Rovers in 1979. He was loaned out to Rochdale and Barnsley before he was allowed to sign with Rochdale permanently in 1982. He moved on to Port Vale in June 1983 and helped the "Valiants" to win promotion out of the Fourth Division in 1985–86. He joined Wrexham in May 1986 before he was bought by Burnley for £4,000 in July 1987. He won a Football League Trophy runners-up medal with the "Clarets" in 1988 and helped the club to win the Fourth Division title in 1991–92. He later played for Bradford City, before spending time with non-League clubs Chorley, Fleetwood, Accrington Stanley, and Rossendale United.

== Career ==
Pearce was an apprentice at Wolverhampton Wanderers but was never offered a professional contract at Molineux. He instead turned professional with Howard Kendall's Blackburn Rovers in 1979. He spent three years at Ewood Park but never made a first-team appearance. He did though play five Fourth Division games on loan at Rochdale in the 1980–81 season. He was also loaned out to Second Division side Barnsley, but never made a first-team appearance for the "Tykes". He returned to Rochdale on a free transfer for the start of the 1982–83 campaign. Described as "brave and agile", he also appeared to be vulnerable on crosses. He played 36 league games at Spotland, before Jimmy Greenhoff replaced Peter Madden as manager, and selected Graham Crawford for the end-of-season run-in.

He was signed by John McGrath's Port Vale as an understudy to Barry Siddall in June 1983. He featured eight times in the 1983–84 season, as the "Valiants" suffered relegation out of the Third Division. He became new manager John Rudge's preferred choice in goal, and played 43 games in the 1984–85 campaign. However, he lost his first-team place at Vale Park to new signing Jim Arnold – who went on to win the club's Player of the Year award, and featured just six times in the 1985–86 Fourth Division promotion winning campaign. He was given a free transfer in May 1986, and moved on to Wrexham. He played 25 Fourth Division games for Dixie McNeil's "Dragons" in the 1986–87 season, and also played in Europe against Real Zaragoza at the Racecourse Ground.

Pearce was signed by Burnley manager Brian Miller for a £4,000 fee as a replacement for Joe Neenan in July 1987. He was one of eight "Clarets" players to make his debut in a 3–0 defeat to Colchester United at Turf Moor on 15 August 1987. The team soon gelled, though, and Pearce played a total of 59 games in the 1987–88 campaign. The last of these games was the Football League Trophy final at Wembley, which ended in a 2–0 defeat to Wolverhampton Wanderers. He played 47 games in the 1988–89 campaign. He only missed the chance to become an ever-present for two seasons running due to a facial injury in April. He remained the first-choice goalkeeper ahead of David Williams under new manager Frank Casper. He played 49 matches in the 1989–90 season. He featured 55 times in the 1990–91 campaign as Burnley reached the play-off semi-finals, where they were beaten by Torquay United. On 29 January, he kept a clean sheet against Bradford City at Valley Parade in the Football League Trophy after making "a string of top class saves". However, he played just 14 league games in the 1991–92 season, as Burnley won promotion as champions of the Fourth Division. At various point in the season he was on the bench as David Williams, and loanees Andy Marriott, Mark Kendall, and Nicky Walker all got the nod ahead of Pearce. He was released in April 1992, though had become a "cult figure" at Turf Moor during his 236 league and cup games.

Pearce played nine Second Division games for Bradford City in the 1992–93 campaign. However, he failed to impress for Frank Stapleton's "Bantams" and moved into Northern Premier League football with Chorley, Fleetwood and Accrington Stanley. He also spent time with North West Counties club Rossendale United. After leaving professional football, he worked as a driving instructor and gardener before working for a firm that supplies machines to the paper industry.

== Career statistics ==
Appearances and goals by club, season and competition
| Club | Season | League | | | FA Cup | | Other | | Total | |
| Club | Season | Division | Apps | Goals | Apps | Goals | Apps | Goals | Apps | Goals |
|---|---|---|---|---|---|---|---|---|---|---|
| Blackburn Rovers | 1979–80 | Third Division | 0 | 0 | 0 | 0 | 0 | 0 | 0 | 0 |
| Rochdale (loan) | 1980–81 | Fourth Division | 5 | 0 | 0 | 0 | 2 | 0 | 7 | 0 |
| Barnsley (loan) | 1981–82 | Second Division | 0 | 0 | 0 | 0 | 0 | 0 | 0 | 0 |
| Rochdale | 1982–83 | Fourth Division | 36 | 0 | 1 | 0 | 4 | 0 | 41 | 0 |
| Port Vale | 1983–84 | Third Division | 7 | 0 | 0 | 0 | 1 | 0 | 8 | 0 |
| Port Vale | 1984–85 | Fourth Division | 36 | 0 | 2 | 0 | 5 | 0 | 43 | 0 |
| Port Vale | 1985–86 | Fourth Division | 5 | 0 | 0 | 0 | 1 | 0 | 6 | 0 |
| Port Vale | Total | | 48 | 0 | 2 | 0 | 7 | 0 | 57 | 0 |
| Wrexham | 1986–87 | Fourth Division | 25 | 0 | 3 | 0 | 11 | 0 | 39 | 0 |
| Burnley | 1987–88 | Fourth Division | 46 | 0 | 1 | 0 | 12 | 0 | 59 | 0 |
| Burnley | 1988–89 | Fourth Division | 39 | 0 | 1 | 0 | 7 | 0 | 47 | 0 |
| Burnley | 1989–90 | Fourth Division | 39 | 0 | 6 | 0 | 4 | 0 | 49 | 0 |
| Burnley | 1990–91 | Fourth Division | 43 | 0 | 3 | 0 | 9 | 0 | 55 | 0 |
| Burnley | 1991–92 | Fourth Division | 14 | 0 | 4 | 0 | 8 | 0 | 26 | 0 |
| Burnley | Total | | 181 | 0 | 15 | 0 | 40 | 0 | 236 | 0 |
| Bradford City | 1992–93 | Fourth Division | 9 | 0 | 0 | 0 | 2 | 0 | 11 | 0 |
| Career total | | | 304 | 0 | 21 | 0 | 66 | 0 | 391 | 0 |

== Honours ==
Port Vale

- Football League Fourth Division fourth-place promotion: 1985–86

Burnley

- Football League Fourth Division: 1991–92
- Associate Members' Cup runner-up: 1987–88
