= 1994–95 Wolverhampton Wanderers F.C. season =

English football club season

Wolverhampton Wanderers
1994–95 season
- Chairman: Jonathan Hayward
- Manager: Graham Taylor
- First Division: 4th (lost in play-offs)
- FA Cup: Quarter-finals
- League Cup: 3rd Round
- Anglo-Italian Cup: Group stage
- Top goalscorer: League: Steve Bull (16); All: David Kelly (22)
- Highest home attendance: 28,544 (vs Leicester, 18 February 1995)
- Lowest home attendance: 7,285 (vs Atalanta, 15 November 1994)
- Average home league attendance: 24,792 (league only)

The 1994–95 season was the 96th season of competitive league football in the history of English football club Wolverhampton Wanderers. They played the season in the second tier of the English football system, the Football League First Division.

This was the first full season since the completion of the redevelopment of their Molineux Stadium had been completed, and funding from owner Sir Jack Hayward were now fully focused on improving the team. Manager Graham Taylor spent close to £5 million during the season in an attempt to return the club to the top flight.

Despite suffering extensive injuries to many players, the team finished the season in fourth place – their highest position in the football pyramid since 1983–84 – and so qualified for the play-offs. In the play-off semi-finals they were defeated by the eventual promoted side Bolton Wanderers 2–3 on aggregate.

== Results ==
=== Pre-season ===
Wolves' pre season saw them travel to Denmark and Sweden for several weeks of training and friendly matches. They then returned home to play two home games against Premiership opposition.

19 July 1994	Hvidovre	1–2	Wolverhampton Wanderers	Copenhagen, Denmark
			Bull	Stadium: Hvidovre Stadion

20 July 1994	Sölvesborg	1–6	Wolverhampton Wanderers	Sölvesborg, Sweden
			Dennison; Daley; Mills; Froggatt	Stadium: Sölvesborg; Attendance: 400

23 July 1994	Smedby	0–9	Wolverhampton Wanderers	Norrköping, Sweden
			Bull; Mills; Thompson	Stadium: Smedby Idottspark; Attendance: 500

25 July 1994	Kristianstads	0–2	Wolverhampton Wanderers	Kristianstad, Sweden
			Daley; Bull	Stadium: Kristianstads Idottspark; Attendance: 1,103

27 July 1994	Asarums	1–3	Wolverhampton Wanderers	Asarum, Sweden
			Mills	Stadium: Buckley Park; Attendance: 1,200

3 August 1994	Wolverhampton Wanderers	1–2	Manchester United	Wolverhampton
	Bull		Ince; Blades (o.g.)'	Stadium: Molineux; Attendance: 28,145

6 August 1994	Wolverhampton Wanderers	2–1	Coventry City	Wolverhampton
	Bull; Kelly		Quinn {pen.}'	Stadium: Molineux

8 August 1994	Dundee	1–4	Wolverhampton Wanderers	Dundee
			unknown (o.g.)' Kelly; Cook; Froggatt	Stadium: Dens Park

=== Football League First Division ===
A total of 24 teams competed in the Football League First Division in the 1994–95 season. Each team played every other team twice: once at their stadium, and once at the opposition's. Three points were awarded to teams for each win, one point per draw, and none for defeats. Teams finishing level on points were firstly divided by the number of goals scored rather than goal difference. Only one team was automatically promoted due to the reduction in the number of Premiership teams from 22 to 20.

The provisional fixture list was released on 23 June 1994, but was subject to change in the event of matches being selected for television coverage or police concerns.

13 August 1994 1	Wolverhampton Wanderers	1–0	Reading	Wolverhampton
15:00 BST	Froggatt 11'			Stadium: Molineux; Attendance: 27,012

21 August 1994 2	Notts County	1–1	Wolverhampton Wanderers	Nottingham
14:55 BST	Simpson 35'		Thompson 70' (pen.)	Stadium: Meadow Lane; Attendance: 8,569

28 August 1994 3	Wolverhampton Wanderers	2–0	West Bromwich Albion	Wolverhampton
14:55 BST	Thompson 22' (pen.); Kelly 69'			Stadium: Molineux; Attendance: 27,764

30 August 1994 4	Watford	2–1	Wolverhampton Wanderers	Watford
19:45 BST	Foster 15'; Johnson 87'		Emblen 85'	Stadium: Vicarage Road; Attendance: 10,108

3 September 1994 5	Sunderland	1–1	Wolverhampton Wanderers	Sunderland
15:00 BST	Gray 21'		Venus 42'	Stadium: Roker Park; Attendance: 15,111

10 September 1994 6	Wolverhampton Wanderers	2–0	Tranmere Rovers	Wolverhampton
15:00 BST	Stewart 37'; Emblen 52'			Stadium: Molineux; Attendance: 27,030

13 September 1994 7	Wolverhampton Wanderers	5–0	Southend United	Wolverhampton
19:45 BST	Emblen 7'; Kelly 10'; Froggatt 38'; Walters 63'; Bull 67'			Stadium: Molineux; Attendance: 23,608

17 September 1994 8	Burnley	0–1	Wolverhampton Wanderers	Burnley
15:00 BST			Bull 59'	Stadium: Turf Moor; Attendance: 17,766

24 September 1994 9	Portsmouth	1–2	Wolverhampton Wanderers	Portsmouth
15:00 BST	Creaney 11' (pen.)		Walters 34'; Kelly 87'	Stadium: Fratton Park; Attendance: 13,466

1 October 1994 10	Wolverhampton Wanderers	2–1	Port Vale	Wolverhampton
15:00 BST	Thompson 51' (pen.), 79' (pen.)		Allon 82'	Stadium: Molineux; Attendance: 27,469

8 October 1994 11	Swindon Town	3–2	Wolverhampton Wanderers	Swindon
15:00 BST	Bodin 15'; Scott 28'; Beauchamp 60'		Kelly 13', 41'	Stadium: County Ground; Attendance: 14,036

15 October 1994 12	Wolverhampton Wanderers	2–1	Grimsby Town	Wolverhampton
15:00 BST	Thompson 12' (pen.); Venus 66'		Groves 43'	Stadium: Molineux; Attendance: 24,447

22 October 1994 13	Wolverhampton Wanderers	3–3	Millwall	Wolverhampton
15:00 BST	Bull 27', 52'; Venus 79'		Goodman 39', 86'; Cadette 84'	Stadium: Molineux; Attendance: 25,059

30 October 1994 14	Stoke City	1–1	Wolverhampton Wanderers	Stoke-on-Trent
14:55 GMT	Keen 17'		Bull 41'	Stadium: Victoria Ground; Attendance: 15,928

1 November 1994 15	Bristol City	1–5	Wolverhampton Wanderers	Bristol
19:45 GMT	Baird 31'		Walters 12'; Thompson 36' (pen.); Kelly 63', 65', 88'	Stadium: Ashton Gate; Attendance: 10,401

5 November 1994 16	Wolverhampton Wanderers	2–3	Luton Town	Wolverhampton
15:00 GMT	Stewart 81'; Johnson 84' (o.g.)		Preece 37'; Marshall 47'; Dixon 54'	Stadium: Molineux; Attendance: 26,749

20 November 1994 17	Middlesbrough	1–0	Wolverhampton Wanderers	Middlesbrough
14:55 GMT	Hendrie 67'			Stadium: Ayresome Park; Attendance: 19,953

23 November 1994 18	Wolverhampton Wanderers	3–1	Bolton Wanderers	Wolverhampton
19:45 GMT	Thompson 53' (pen.); Coleman 68' (o.g.); Birch 75'		Paatelainen 15'	Stadium: Molineux; Attendance: 25,903

27 November 1994 19	Wolverhampton Wanderers	0–2	Derby County	Wolverhampton
14:55 GMT			Johnson 14'; Stallard 62'	Stadium: Molineux; Attendance: 22,768

4 December 1994 20	Millwall	1–0	Wolverhampton Wanderers	London
14:55 GMT	Mitchell 67'			Stadium: The New Den; Attendance: 8,025

10 December 1994 21	Wolverhampton Wanderers	1–0	Notts County	Wolverhampton
15:00 GMT	Bull 46'			Stadium: Molineux; Attendance: 25,786

18 December 1994 22	Reading	4–2	Wolverhampton Wanderers	Reading
14:55 GMT	Osborn 23'; Quinn 38'; Gilkes 62', 88'		Bull 9'; Quinn 58' (o.g.)	Stadium: Elm Park; Attendance: 10,136

26 December 1994 23	Oldham Athletic	4–1	Wolverhampton Wanderers	Oldham
15:00 GMT	Ritchie 3', 58', 68'; McCarthy 81'		Dennison 59'	Stadium: Boundary Park; Attendance: 11,962

28 December 1994 24	Wolverhampton Wanderers	2–0	Charlton Athletic	Wolverhampton
19:45 GMT	Bull 38'; Chapple 42' (o.g.)			Stadium: Molineux; Attendance: 26,738

31 December 1994 25	Barnsley	1–3	Wolverhampton Wanderers	Barnsley
15:00 GMT	Redfearn 21' (pen.)		Dennison 1'; Mills 4'; Emblen 75'	Stadium: Oakwell; Attendance: 9,207

2 January 1995 26	Wolverhampton Wanderers	2–2	Sheffield United	Wolverhampton
15:00 GMT	de Wolf 89' (pen.); Emblen 90'		Blake 59', 69'	Stadium: Molineux; Attendance: 27,809

14 January 1995 27	Wolverhampton Wanderers	2–0	Stoke City	Wolverhampton
15:00 BST	Kelly 16'; Dennison 86'			Stadium: Molineux; Attendance: 28,298

4 February 1995 28	Bolton Wanderers	5–1	Wolverhampton Wanderers	Bolton
15:00 GMT	Sneekes 9'; Coleman 37'; Phillips 60'; Coyle 78'; Thompson 83'		Goodman 26'	Stadium: Burnden Park; Attendance: 16,964

11 February 1995 29	Wolverhampton Wanderers	2–0	Bristol City	Wolverhampton
15:00 GMT	Dennison 25'; Kelly 61'			Stadium: Molineux; Attendance: 25,451

21 February 1995 30	Wolverhampton Wanderers	0–2	Middlesbrough	Wolverhampton
19:45 GMT			Vickers 55'; Fuchs 81'	Stadium: Molineux; Attendance: 27,611

25 February 1995 31	Port Vale	2–4	Wolverhampton Wanderers	Burslem
15:00 GMT	Naylor 18'; Kent 56'		de Wolf 2', 42' (pen.), 68'; Bull 45'	Stadium: Vale Park; Attendance: 13,676

5 March 1995 32	Wolverhampton Wanderers	1–0	Portsmouth	Wolverhampton
14:55 GMT	Bull 73'			Stadium: Molineux; Attendance: 23,284

8 March 1995 33	Wolverhampton Wanderers	1–0	Sunderland	Wolverhampton
19:45 GMT	Thompson 47' (pen.)			Stadium: Molineux; Attendance: 25,926

15 March 1995 34	West Bromwich Albion	2–0	Wolverhampton Wanderers	West Bromwich
19:45 GMT	Ashcroft 6'; Taylor 82'			Stadium: The Hawthorns; Attendance: 20,661

18 March 1995 35	Wolverhampton Wanderers	1–1	Watford	Wolverhampton
15:00 GMT	Thomas 23'		Phillips 90'	Stadium: Molineux; Attendance: 24,380

24 March 1995 36	Wolverhampton Wanderers	2–0	Burnley	Wolverhampton
19:45 GMT	Bull 9'; Emblen 59'			Stadium: Molineux; Attendance: 25,703

1 April 1995 37	Southend United	0–1	Wolverhampton Wanderers	Southend-on-Sea
15:00 BST			Bull 83'	Stadium: Roots Hall; Attendance: 8,522

4 April 1995 38	Luton Town	3–3	Wolverhampton Wanderers	Luton
19:45 BST	Telfer 6', 11'; Taylor 51'		Kelly 48', 59'; Emblen 90'	Stadium: Kenilworth Road; Attendance: 9,651

8 April 1995 39	Wolverhampton Wanderers	0–0	Barnsley	Wolverhampton
15:00 BST				Stadium: Molineux; Attendance: 26,385

12 April 1995 40	Derby County	3–3	Wolverhampton Wanderers	Derby
19:45 BST	Simpson 35' (pen.), 64'; Gabbiadini 52'		Goodman 11'; Richards 75', 90'	Stadium: Baseball Ground; Attendance: 16,040

15 April 1995 41	Charlton Athletic	3–2	Wolverhampton Wanderers	London
15:00 BST	Whyte 12'; Walsh 55'; Mortimer 61'		Bull 43', 67'	Stadium: The Valley; Attendance: 10,922

17 April 1995 42	Wolverhampton Wanderers	2–1	Oldham Athletic	Wolverhampton
15:00 BST	Kelly 33', 82'		Bernard 37'	Stadium: Molineux; Attendance: 25,840

22 April 1996 43	Sheffield United	3–3	Wolverhampton Wanderers	Sheffield
15:00 BST	Whitehouse 16' (pen.); Foran 73'; Flo 90'		Goodman 58'; Bull 65'; Kelly 83'	Stadium: Bramall Lane; Attendance: 16,714

29 April 1995 44	Grimsby Town	0–0	Wolverhampton Wanderers	Cleethorpes
15:00 BST				Stadium: Blundell Park; Attendance: 10,112

3 May 1995 45	Tranmere Rovers	1–1	Wolverhampton Wanderers	Birkenhead
19:45 BST	Aldridge 34'		Bull 73'	Stadium: Prenton Park; Attendance: 12,306

7 May 1995 46	Wolverhampton Wanderers	1–1	Swindon Town	Wolverhampton
13:30 BST	Thompson 36' (pen.)		Thorne 39'	Stadium: Molineux; Attendance: 26,245

Final table

Pos	Team	Pld	W	D	L	GF	GA	GD	Pts
1	Middlesbrough	46	23	13	10	67	40	+27	82
2	Reading	46	23	10	13	58	44	+14	79
3	Bolton Wanderers	46	21	14	11	67	45	+22	77
4	Wolverhampton Wanderers	46	21	13	12	77	61	+16	76
5	Tranmere Rovers	46	22	10	14	67	58	+9	76
6	Barnsley	46	20	12	14	63	52	+11	72

Source: Statto.com

Results summary

Overall								Home						Away					
Pld	W	D	L	GF	GA	GD	Pts	W	D	L	GF	GA	GD	W	D	L	GF	GA	GD
46	21	13	12	77	61	+16	76	15	5	3	39	18	+21	6	8	9	38	43	−5

Source: Statto.com

Results by round

Round	1	2	3	4	5	6	7	8	9	10	11	12	13	14	15	16	17	18	19	20	21	22	23	24	25	26	27	28	29	30	31	32	33	34	35	36	37	38	39	40	41	42	43	44	45	46
Result	W	D	W	L	D	W	W	W	W	W	L	W	D	D	W	L	L	W	L	L	W	L	L	W	W	D	W	L	W	L	W	W	W	L	D	W	W	D	D	D	L	W	D	D	D	D
Position	7	5	3	6	7	3	1	1	1	1	1	1	1	1	1	1	2	1	2	3	2	2	4	2	2	2	2	4	2	6	5	4	3	4	4	4	3	3	4	4	4	4	4	4	4	4

Source: Statto.com
W = Win; D = Draw; L = Loss

=== Play-offs ===
14 May 1995 SF 1	Wolverhampton Wanderers	2–1	Bolton Wanderers	Wolverhampton
14:55 BST	Bull 44'; Venus 51'		McAteer 46'	Stadium: Molineux; Attendance: 26,153; Referee: Clive Wilkes

17 May 1995 SF 2	Bolton Wanderers	2–0 (a.e.t.) (3–2 agg.)	Wolverhampton Wanderers	Bolton
19:30 BST	McGinlay 44', 109'			Stadium: Burnden Park; Attendance: 20,041; Referee: Steve Dunn

=== FA Cup ===
7 January 1995 R3	Mansfield Town	2–3	Wolverhampton Wanderers	Mansfield
15:00 GMT	Donaldson 8'; Ireland 10'		D. Kelly 52'; Dennison 60'; Mills 71'	Stadium: Field Mill; Attendance: 6,701; Referee: Eddie Wolstenholme

30 January 1995 R4	Sheffield Wednesday	0–0	Wolverhampton Wanderers	Sheffield
19:45 GMT				Stadium: Hillsborough; Attendance: 21,757; Referee: Alan Wilkie

8 February 1995 R4 rep.	Wolverhampton Wanderers	1–1 (a.e.t.) (4–3 p)	Sheffield Wednesday	Wolverhampton
19:45 GMT	D. Kelly 13'		Bright 56'	Stadium: Molineux; Attendance: 28,136; Referee: Alan Wilkie
	Penalties
	Thompson (penalty missed); Dennison (penalty missed); Cowans (penalty scored); Kelly (penalty scored) de Wolf (penalty scored); Goodman (penalty scored)		(penalty scored) Bright; (penalty scored) Whittingham; (penalty scored) Pressman; (penalty missed) Pearce; (penalty missed) Bart-Williams; (penalty missed) Waddle

18 February 1995 R5	Wolverhampton Wanderers	1–0	Leicester City	Wolverhampton
15:00 GMT	D. Kelly 34'			Stadium: Molineux; Attendance: 28,544; Referee: Robbie Hart

11 March 1995 QF	Crystal Palace	1–1	Wolverhampton Wanderers	London
15:00 GMT	Dowie 53'		Cowans 66'	Stadium: Selhurst Park; Attendance: 14,604; Referee: Gary Willard

22 March 1995 QF rep.	Wolverhampton Wanderers	1–4	Crystal Palace	Wolverhampton
19:45 GMT	D. Kelly 35'		Armstrong 33', 68'; Dowie 38'; Pitcher 45'	Stadium: Molineux; Attendance: 27,548; Referee: Gary Willard

=== League Cup ===
20 September 1994 R2.1	Chesterfield	1–3	Wolverhampton Wanderers	Chesterfield
19:30 BST	Moss 11'		Bull 63', 86'; Kelly 77'	Stadium: Saltergate; Attendance: 5,895

27 September 1994 R2.2	Wolverhampton Wanderers	1–1 (4–2 agg.)	Chesterfield	Wolverhampton
19:45 BST	Froggatt 3'		Jules 52'	Stadium: Molineux; Attendance: 14,815

26 October 1994 R3	Wolverhampton Wanderers	2–3	Nottingham Forest	Wolverhampton
19:45 GMT	Birch 41'; Kelly 60'		Pearce 5'; Roy 21', 87'	Stadium: Molineux; Attendance: 28,369

=== Anglo-Italian Cup ===
Wolves played in Group A of the competition, in which the best English club in the group would advance to the semi-finals. However, they finished fourth in the group overall, and were only the second-best English side and so eliminated.

24 August 1994	Lecce	0–1	Wolverhampton Wanderers	Lecce, Italy
19:30 BST			Kelly 81'	Stadium: Stadio Via del Mare; Attendance: 1,795

6 September 1994	Wolverhampton Wanderers	0–1	Ascoli	Wolverhampton
19:45 BST			Marcato 57'	Stadium: Molineux; Attendance: 9,599

5 October 1994	Venezia	2–1	Wolverhampton Wanderers	Venice, Italy
20:30 BST	Bottazzi 37'; Vieri 59' (pen.)		Venus 28'	Stadium: Stadio Pier Luigi Penzo; Attendance: 750

15 November 1994	Wolverhampton Wanderers	1–1	Atalanta	Wolverhampton
19:45 BST	Mills 39'		Bonacina 7'	Stadium: Molineux; Attendance: 7,285

== Players ==
Key:
‡ On loan from another club * First appearance(s) for the club

- # = Squad number
- Pos = Playing position
- P = Number of games played 10
- G = Number of goals scored
- GK = Goalkeeper
- DF = Defender
- MF = Midfielder
- FW = Forward
- = Yellow cards
- = Red cards
- † Permanent player left club during the season
- ¤ Loaned to another club for part or all of season

Correct as of end of season. Starting appearances are listed first, followed by substitute appearances in parentheses where applicable.

Pos	Name	P	G	P	G	P	G	P	G	P	G	P	G	A yellow card	A red card	Notes
Pos	Name	League		FA Cup		League Cup		Playoffs		Other		Total		Discipline		Notes
GK	(England) Andy De Bont	0	0	0	0	0	0	0	0	0	0	0	0	0	0	
GK	(Wales) Paul Jones	9	0	4	0	0	0	0	0	3	0	16	0	0	0	
GK	(England) Mike Stowell	37	0	2	0	3	0	2	0	1	0	45	0	0	0	
DF	(England) Paul Blades	30(2)	0	3	0	2(1)	0	0	0	4	0	39(3)	0	0	0	
DF	(Netherlands) John de Wolf	13	4	4	0	0	0	0	0	0	0	17	4	0	0	
DF	(Wales) Brian Law	17	0	6	0	0	0	0	0	0	0	23	0	0	1	
DF	(Northern Ireland) Neil Masters	3(2)	0	0	0	0	0	0	0	0	0	3(2)	0	0	0	
DF	(England) Dean Richards ‡	10	2	0	0	0	0	2	0	0	0	12	2	0	0	
DF	(England) Peter Shirtliff (c)	26(2)	0	2	0	2	0	2	0	2	0	34(2)	0	0	0	
DF	(England) Darren Simkin †	0	0	0	0	0	0	0	0	0	0	0	0	0	0	
DF	(England) Jamie Smith	24(1)	0	1	0	3	0	0	0	2	0	30(1)	0	0	1	
DF	(England) Andy Thompson	30(1)	9	5	0	3	0	2	0	4	0	44(1)	9	0	0	
DF	(England) Mark Venus	35(4)	3	3(1)	0	3	0	2	1	4	1	47(5)	5	0	0	
MF	(Scotland) Tom Bennett	4(4)	0	2(1)	0	0	0	0	0	1	0	7(5)	0	0	0	
MF	(England) Paul Birch	8(2)	1	1	0	3	1	0	0	3(1)	0	15(3)	2	0	0	
MF	(England) Mark Burke †	0	0	0	0	0	0	0	0	0	0	0	0	0	0	
MF	(England) Paul Cook †	0	0	0	0	0	0	0	0	0	0	0	0	0	0	
MF	(England) Gordon Cowans	21	0	5	1	0	0	2	0	0	0	28	1	0	0	
MF	(England) Tony Daley	0(1)	0	0	0	0	0	0	0	0	0	0(1)	0	0	0	
MF	(Northern Ireland) Robbie Dennison	21(1)	4	6	1	0	0	2	0	0(1)	0	29(2)	5	0	0	
MF	(England) Neil Emblen	23(4)	7	3(2)	0	1(1)	0	0	0	2(1)	0	29(8)	7	0	0	
MF	(Scotland) Darren Ferguson	22(2)	0	0	0	3	0	0	0	4	0	29(2)	0	0	0	
MF	(England) Steve Froggatt	20	2	0	0	3	1	0	0	2	0	25	3	0	0	
MF	(England) Kevin Keen †	1	0	0	0	0(1)	0	0	0	2	0	3(1)	0	0	0	
MF	(England) Jimmy Kelly	0	0	0	0	0	0	0	0	0	0	0	0	0	0	
MF	(England) Chris Marsden †	0	0	0	0	0	0	0	0	0	0	0	0	0	0	
MF	(England) Mark Rankine	24(3)	0	4(1)	0	0(1)	0	2	0	2(2)	0	32(7)	0	0	0	
MF	(England) Geoff Thomas	13(1)	1	0	0	1	0	0	0	2	0	16(1)	1	0	0	
MF	(England) Mark Walters ‡	11	3	0	0	0	0	0	0	0	0	11	3	0	0	
MF	(England) Jermaine Wright	0(6)	0	0	0	0	0	0(1)	0	0	0	0(7)	0	0	0	
FW	(England) Steve Bull	31	16	2	0	3	2	2	1	1	0	39	19	0	0	
FW	(England) Don Goodman	24	3	5(1)	0	0	0	2	0	0	0	31(1)	3	0	0	
FW	(Republic of Ireland) David Kelly	38(4)	15	6	4	3	2	2	0	1	1	50(4)	22	0	1	
FW	(England) Lee Mills †	6(5)	1	2(1)	1	0	0	0	0	2	1	10(6)	3	0	0	
FW	(England) Paul Stewart ‡	5(3)	2	0	0	0	0	0	0	2	0	7(3)	2	0	0	

Source: Wolverhampton Wanderers: The Complete Record

== Transfers ==
=== In ===
Date	Player	From	Fee
6 June 1994	(England) Tony Daley	Aston Villa	£1.25 million
11 July 1994	(England) Steve Froggatt	Aston Villa	£1 million
14 July 1994	(England) Neil Emblen	Millwall	£600,000
5 December 1994	(Netherlands) John de Wolf	Feyenoord	£600,000
5 December 1994	(England) Don Goodman	Sunderland	£1.1 million
19 December 1994	(England) Gordon Cowans	Derby County	£20,000
23 December 1994	(Wales) Brian Law	Queens Park Rangers	£134,000
29 December 1994	(England) Jermaine Wright	Millwall	£60,000

=== Out ===
Date	Player	To	Fee
1 July 1994	(England) Mark Turner	Northampton Town	Free
6 July 1994	(England) Darren Roberts	Doncaster Rovers	Free
August 1994	(England) Shaun Bradbury	Hereford United	Free
3 August 1994	(England) Derek Mountfield	Carlisle United	Free
10 August 1994	(England) Kevin Ashley	Peterborough United	Free
12 August 1994	(England) Cyrille Regis	Wycombe Wanderers	Free
15 August 1994	(England) Mark Burke	Port Vale	£75,000
18 August 1994	(England) Paul Cook	Coventry City	£600,000
19 October 1994	(England) Kevin Keen	Stoke City	£300,000
15 November 1994	(England) Chris Marsden	Notts County	£250,000
December 1994	(England) Darren Simkin	Shrewsbury Town	£36,000
2 March 1995	(England) Lee Mills	Derby County	£400,000

=== Loans in ===
Start date	Player	From	End date
2 September 1994	(England) Paul Stewart	Liverpool	November 1994
9 September 1994	(England) Mark Walters	Liverpool	October 1994
25 March 1995	(England) Dean Richards	Bradford City	End of season

== Management and coaching staff ==
Position	Name
Manager	Graham Taylor
Assistant manager	Bobby Downes
First Team coach	Steve Harrison
Youth Development Officer	Rob Kelly
Youth Team coach	Chris Evans
Club doctors	Dr Peter Ackroyd and Dr Peter Bekenn
Club Physio	Barry Holmes
