= Ray Deakin =

English footballer (1959-2008)

Personal information
- Full name: Raymond John Deakin
- Date of birth: 19 June 1959
- Place of birth: Liverpool, England
- Date of death: 24 December 2008 (aged 49)
- Place of death: York, England
- Height: 5 ft 8 in (1.73 m)
- Position: Left-back

Youth career
- 1975–1977: Everton

Senior career*
Years	Team	Apps	(Gls)
1977–1981	Everton	0	(0)
1981–1982	Port Vale	23	(6)
1982–1985	Bolton Wanderers	105	(2)
1985–1991	Burnley	213	(6)
Total		341	(14)
- * Club domestic league appearances and goals

Raymond John Deakin (19 June 1959 – 24 December 2008) was an English footballer whose playing position was left-back. He had a 14-year career in the Football League with Everton, Port Vale, Bolton Wanderers, and Burnley. He captained Burnley at Wembley in the 1988 Football League Trophy final.

== Career ==
Born in Liverpool, Deakin began his career at Everton, where he signed his first professional contract under Gordon Lee in 1977. However, he never made any appearances for the "Toffees" first-team, and was released from Goodison Park in 1981. He then joined John McGrath's Port Vale, where he spent one season. He was initially a regular in the "Valiants" team, but lost his place in October 1981 and struggled to break back into first-team contention thereafter. He claimed seven goals (including five penalties) in 27 Fourth Division and FA Cup appearances, having scored his first goal in the Football League on 5 September 1981, in a 1–1 draw with Darlington at Feethams.

Deakin left Vale Park and joined Bolton Wanderers on a free transfer in May 1982. John McGovern's "Trotters" were relegated out of the Second Division in last place in 1982–83, though only three more points would have seen Bolton escape the drop at the expense of Grimsby Town. Wanderers finished tenth in the Third Division in 1983–84, before dropping to 17th place in 1984–85. He scored two goals in 105 league games during his three-season stay at Burnden Park.

Deakin signed for Martin Buchan's Burnley in 1985. He scored three goals in 52 games in 1985–86 and again played all 52 games in the 1986–87 campaign, as he remained in the starting eleven as the "Clarets" switched manager from Buchan to Tommy Cavanagh and then to Brian Miller. An ever-present during his first two seasons at the club, he was eventually given the captain's armband. In May 1987, he captained Burnley at the lowest point of their history, when the club almost dropped out of the Football League and only survived on the last day of the season with a 2–1 victory over Orient at Turf Moor. He played 48 games in the 1987–88 season, and captained the club at Wembley in the 2–0 defeat to Wolverhampton Wanderers in the final of the Football League Trophy. However, he featured just 16 times in the 1988–89 season, as he began to become afflicted by injury; during his downtime he began training to be a coach driver. He forced his way back into new manager Frank Casper's first-team with 35 appearances in the 1989–90 campaign. He played 50 games as Burnley reached the play-offs in the 1990–91 season, where they were beaten by Torquay United at the semi-final stage. He then announced his retirement from professional football.

== Death ==
In 2008, Deakin was diagnosed with terminal brain cancer and died on Christmas Eve that year, at the age of 49.

== Career statistics ==
Appearances and goals by club, season and competition
Club	Season	League			FA Cup		Other		Total	
Club	Season	Division	Apps	Goals	Apps	Goals	Apps	Goals	Apps	Goals
Everton	1977–78	First Division	0	0	0	0	0	0	0	0
Everton	1978–79	First Division	0	0	0	0	0	0	0	0
Everton	1979–80	First Division	0	0	0	0	0	0	0	0
Everton	1980–81	First Division	0	0	0	0	0	0	0	0
Everton	Total		0	0	0	0	0	0	0	0
Port Vale	1981–82	Fourth Division	23	6	0	0	4	1	27	7
Bolton Wanderers	1982–83	Second Division	30	1	1	0	1	0	32	1
Bolton Wanderers	1983–84	Third Division	41	1	4	0	3	0	48	1
Bolton Wanderers	1984–85	Third Division	34	0	1	0	6	0	41	0
Bolton Wanderers	Total		105	2	6	0	10	0	121	2
Burnley	1985–86	Fourth Division	46	3	2	0	4	0	52	3
Burnley	1986–87	Fourth Division	46	0	1	0	5	0	52	0
Burnley	1987–88	Fourth Division	37	3	1	0	10	0	48	3
Burnley	1988–89	Fourth Division	14	0	0	0	2	0	16	0
Burnley	1989–90	Fourth Division	33	0	0	0	2	0	35	0
Burnley	1990–91	Fourth Division	37	0	3	0	10	0	50	0
Burnley	Total		213	6	7	0	33	0	253	6
Career total			341	14	13	0	47	1	401	15

== Honours ==
Burnley

- Associate Members' Cup runner-up: 1987–88
