= Jackie Gallagher (footballer) =

English footballer (born 1958)

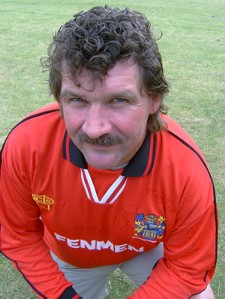

Personal information
- Date of birth: 6 April 1958 (age 68)
- Place of birth: Wisbech, England
- Height: 5 ft 10 in (1.78 m)
- Position: Forward

Senior career*
Years	Team	Apps	(Gls)
1975–1978	Lincoln City	1	(0)
1978–1979	King's Lynn	?	(1)
1978–1980	Wisbech Town		
1980–1981	Peterborough United	13	(1)
1981–1982	Eastern AA		
1982–1983	Torquay United	42	(7)
1983–1984	Drogheda United	8	(0)
1984–1985	Wisbech Town		
1985–1987	Peterborough United	82	(20)
1987–1989	Wolverhampton Wanderers	27	(4)
1988–1989	→ Wisbech Town (loan)		
1988–1989	→ Kettering Town (loan)		
1989–1990	Boston United	17	(0)
1989–1992	King's Lynn	?	(24)
1991–1992	Grantham Town	1	(0)
- Diss Town
1993–1994	King's Lynn	?	(93)
- Fakenham Town
1995–1998(?)	Wisbech Town		
1999–2000	Chatteris Town		
2000–2008	Wisbech Town		

Managerial career
- 2003–2004: Wisbech Town
- * Club domestic league appearances and goals

Jackie Gallagher (born 6 April 1958) is an English former professional footballer who played 165 games in the lower division of the Football League, scoring 32 goals.

In May 2009, he resigned as the Under-18 team manager of non-league Wisbech Town, a club for whom he made first team appearances for during his teenage years, his 20s, 30s, 40s and 50s. Although he has no formal involvement in football any more, he still turns out for the Posh Legends, the veteran side of Peterborough United.

== Career ==
Gallagher, a forward, began his career in the youth team at Guyhirn where an impressive appearance in a youth cup final against Wisbech Town in 1973 saw him switch clubs to the Fenmen, making his first-team debut at the end of the 1973–74 season in the first leg of the county cup final against Willingham.

He moved on to March Town United before joining Lincoln City in February 1976. His league debut came the following season, but turned out to be his only league appearance for the Imps and he returned to non-league football, joining King's Lynn.

He moved to Wisbech Town in 1978, from where he joined Peterborough United in April 1980. However, he played only 13 league games for Peterborough and left league football again, playing in Hong Kong with Eastern AA alongside Bobby Moore.

In August 1982 he joined Bruce Rioch's Torquay United on non-contract terms following his return to the UK. He was rewarded with a one-year contract, scoring nine times in 42 league games as well as the winning goal in the FA Cup tie at home to Oxford United that saw the Gulls through to the Fourth Round for only the fourth time in their history. Despite a successful season, he left at the end of it, returning to Wisbech Town debuting in the 1–0 Eastern Counties League victory at Tiptree United on 20 August 1983. He moved on to join Irish side Drogheda United, helping them defeat Athlone Town 3–1 at Tolka Park on 5 January 1984 to lift the League of Ireland Cup. Gallagher returned to Wisbech Town for the 1984–85 season before rejoining another of his former clubs, Peterborough United, in August 1985. His second spell proved his strongest in league football, as he netted 24 goals in 82 league games, earning a move to Wolverhampton Wanderers in June 1987. He found opportunities limited at Molineux due to the prolific partnership of Steve Bull and Andy Mutch, but did play at Wembley in their victory in the Associate Members' Cup Final in May 1988. He was loaned to both Wisbech Town and Kettering Town during the following season before being released in September 1989, and joining Conference side Boston United.

He made his Conference debut on 27 September 1989 at home to Enfield and remained with Boston until 1990. He subsequently went on to play for King's Lynn, Grantham Town, Diss Town, Fakenham Town. He linked up with Chatteris Town scoring on his debut in the 2–1 away defeat to Whitton United on 4 March 2000.

He returned to Wisbech Town in 2000, where he was also reserve team manager. He was promoted to manager of Wisbech Town in June 2003, but was sacked in October 2004 after Wisbech had gone nine games without a win. He later returned to the coaching staff at Wisbech and played his last match for Wisbech in 2005, in the reserves. At the age of 50, Jackie made a celebratory final appearance for Wisbech, coming on for the final five minutes of the 2–1 home victory over Woodbridge Town on 3 May 2008.

== Honours ==
Drogheda United

- League of Ireland Cup: 1983–84

Wolverhampton Wanderers

- Football League Fourth Division: 1987–88
- Associate Members' Cup: 1987–88
