= Neil Edwards =

Neil Edwards may refer to:

- Neil Edwards (rugby union) (born 1964), Scottish rugby union international
- Neil Edwards (footballer, born 1967), English footballer
- Neil Edwards (footballer, born 1970), Welsh footballer
- Neil Edwards (cricketer) (born 1983), English cricketer
