= Andrew Farrell (disambiguation) =

Andy Farrell (born 1975) is an English rugby union coach and former rugby league, and rugby union player.

Andrew Farrell and Andy Farrell may also refer to:

- Andy Farrell (footballer) (born 1965), former English football midfielder
- Andrew Farrell (soccer) (born 1992), American soccer player
