= Gary Bellamy =

English footballer and manager

Personal information
- Date of birth: 4 July 1962 (age 64)
- Place of birth: Worksop, England
- Position: Defender

Youth career
- Worksop Town
- Chesterfield

Senior career*
Years	Team	Apps	(Gls)
1980–1987	Chesterfield	184	(7)
1987–1992	Wolverhampton Wanderers	136	(9)
1992	→ Cardiff City (loan)	9	(0)
1992–1996	Leyton Orient	132	(6)
1996–1998	Chelmsford City	64	(1)
1996	→ Braintree Town (loan)		

Managerial career
- 1996–2001: Chelmsford City
- 2001: Dover Athletic
- 2001–2003: Braintree Town
- * Club domestic league appearances and goals

Gary Bellamy (born 4 July 1962) is an English former professional footballer. He began his career at Chesterfield, making over 150 appearances for the club before joining Wolverhampton Wanderers in 1987. He helped the club to back-to-back promotions from Division Four to Division Two, as well as winning the Football League Trophy in 1988. He had a brief spell on loan at Cardiff City in 1982 before moving to Leyton Orient.

Bellamy later joined Chelmsford City as player-manager and also managed Dover Athletic and Braintree Town.

== Career ==
=== Chesterfield ===
Bellamy had a spell at Nottinghamshire County Cricket Club as a teenager, but decided to pursue a career in football instead, joining Chesterfield as a trainee. He broke into the first team and played seven seasons at Saltergate. He won the (old) Fourth Division championship in 1984–85 with the club and made a total of 207 appearances in all competitions for the Spirites, despite missing 15 months through injury. Following his return from injury, Bellamy was set to move to Birmingham City but the transfer collapsed.

=== Wolverhampton Wanderers ===
He left the club in July 1987 after becoming embroiled in a contract dispute to join then-fourth tier Wolverhampton Wanderers for a £17,500 fee set at tribunal. After making his debut for the club on 12 September 1987 in a 2–2 draw with Crewe Alexandra, he won the Fourth Division championship for the second time in his career. The defender also got to experience a Wembley final as the club lifted the Football League Trophy at the end of the season too, defeating Burnley 2–0 in the final. His second season with Wolves saw him add another medal as the club immediately won the (old) Third Division. He remained a first choice player in his first season at the second flight level in 1989–90 but subsequently was used only sparingly in the following two seasons.

At the start of the 1991–92 season, Bellamy contracted Lyme disease on a pre-season tour of Scandinavia which kept him out for the opening weeks of the season and he was unable to force his way back into the side on his return. He joined Cardiff City on loan in a bid to regain fitness toward the end of the season, making nine league appearances for the Bluebirds.

=== Later career ===
The following season, Bellamy was sold to Third Division Leyton Orient for £30,000 in September 1992. Here, he played as a first choice player for four seasons, despite continued friction with then manager Peter Eustace, before leaving for non-league Chelmsford City in June 1996. Just five months later, he took up a joint manager role for the club and spent five years in this capacity, winning promotion to the Isthmian League Premier Division in 2001. He had earlier guided them to promotion in 1998, but their ground was deemed not to meet the requirements of the higher division at that time.

This promotion success alerted Conference side Dover Athletic to him and he took up the reins there following this in June 2001. However, he was sacked only months later in November as the club struggled. He became manager of Braintree Town, where he had had a loan spell as a player, but was later fired in November 2003.

== Honours ==
Chesterfield

- Football League Fourth Division: 1984–85

Wolverhampton Wanderers

- Football League Third Division: 1988–89
- Football League Fourth Division: 1987–88
- Full Members' Cup: 1987–88

== In culture ==
In 2008 the English classical composer Mark-Anthony Turnage wrote a short piece for counter tenor and harp inspired by Gary Bellamy. The text was a Leyton Orient terrace chant including the line "he looks so flash/ With his northern 'tache". It was released on The NMC Songbook, a 4-CD box set to mark the 20th anniversary of NMC Recordings.
