= Liam Spencer =

English painter (born 1964)

Liam Spencer (born 1964) is a British artist.

== Early life ==
Spencer was born in Burnley, Lancashire and attended St Theodore's RC High School. He studied at Burnley College and the Manchester School of Art (now Manchester Metropolitan University).

== Career ==
Spencer, a leading figure of the Manchester art scene since the 1990s, came to prominence when he was invited to do the first solo exhibition of contemporary art "Urban Panoramas" at the Lowry Centre, Salford in 2000.

In 2006 he was the youngest artist to have a retrospective at the Manchester City Art Gallery "From Manchester to Shanghai". This coincided with a short documentary on the BBC series, Inside Out, that showed several of the collections of his work; calling Liam one of the rising stars of the British contemporary arts scene.

He produced motifs and artwork for the 2008 UEFA Cup Final in Manchester. His art was featured on promotional material and signage for the event.

Spencer's best known paintings are impressionist pieces focusing on urban scenes - motorways, shops, petrol station - most frequently of Greater Manchester, Lancashire and North West England, such as "Crown Chippy, Rawtenstall" (2003) and "Salford Panorama" (2000). He has painted other urban centres, including New York City, "Times Square, New York" (2003), Venice, Hong Kong and Shanghai. A popular format for his paintings are the "Panoramas", long thin paintings.

Spencer's work is exhibited in public collections, the largest collection is believed to be part of the Elspeth and Imogen Turner Collection.
