= Blessed Trinity Roman Catholic College =

Location
- Ormerod Road; Burnley, Lancashire, BB10 3AA; England; 53.794°N 2.229°W

Information
- Type: Academy
- Religious affiliation: Roman Catholic
- Established: 2006
- Local authority: Lancashire
- Trust: Romero Catholic Academy Trust
- Department for Education URN: 147581 Tables
- Ofsted: Reports
- Chair of Governors: Ken Tyson
- Head teacher: Deborah Williams
- Gender: Coeducational
- Age: 11 to 16
- Enrolment: 1250
- Colours: Blue & gold
- Website: www.btrcc.lancs.sch.uk

Blessed Trinity Roman Catholic College is a coeducational Roman Catholic secondary school located in Burnley, Lancashire, England.

== History ==
The school opened in 2006 as part of an ambitious plan to replace all of the district's 11 to 16 schools, funded by a government public–private partnership programme called Building Schools for the Future. It was formed from the merger of St Theodore's Boys High School and St Hilda's Girls' High School and initially occupied split sites of the former St Hilda's and Habergham Sixth Form Centre. Bernadette Bleasdale, who had been the head of St Hilda's since 1992, became the new school's first head teacher.

=== Former schools ===
St Theodore's RC High School was a boys' 11 to 16 school with a mixed sixth form.

St Hilda's RC High School was a girls' high school, which originally opened in 1954.

=== History ===
Following an inspection by Ofsted in 2008, Blessed Trinity was awarded the status of a "good school, with outstanding elements".

Shortly after Ofsted placed the school in special measures in 2011, Bleasdale announced her retirement. Richard Varey took over as head teacher, and the school exited special measures in 2013.

Following an inspection by Ofsted in 2023, Blessed Trinity was awarded the status of "improvement needed, with issues in the quality of education and leadership/management".

=== New building ===
Demolition started on the former St Theodore's site in 2008, and the school moved into a new £24m building in 2010. The new college holds approximately 1,000 students, and will eventually hold a 1,250 capacity.

=== Academy ===
Previously a voluntary aided school administered by Lancashire County Council, Blessed Trinity converted to academy status in 2020. The school is now sponsored by the Romero Catholic Academy Trust.

== Attainment ==
Pupils with equivalent of 5 or more GCSEs grade C or above (inc. English & Maths)
Year (Source)	Students	% special educational needs	England %	School %
2004* (BBC)(BBC)	(158 148) 306	(1.9 7.5) 4.6	42.7	(44.0 61.0) 52.0
2005* (BBC)(BBC)	(123 141) 264	(13.0 10.6) 11.7	44.9	(42.0 57.0) 50.0
2006	-	-	-	-
2007 (BBC)	301	9.0	46.7	45.0
2008 (BBC)	294	7.5	47.6	43.0
2009 (BBC)	294	9.2	49.8	44.0
2010 (DfE)	272	12.8	53.4	51.0
2011 (DfE)	245	8.0	58.9	47.0
2012 (DfE)	241	10.0	59.4	51.0
2013 (DfE)	244	6.0	59.2	57.0
2014 (DfE)	243	4.0	53.4	56.0
2015 (DfE)	235	2.0	53.8	65.0
*Figures for previous school, in this case: St Theodore's (boys) & St Hilda's (girls) RC Schools

In 2007, the school's value-added measure was 1006.7 (national average 1000). In 2010, the school was again the highest performing in the borough in terms of GCSE results.

The DfE figures released in 2011 showed Blessed Trinity to be the only school in Burnley in which more than half the pupils achieved five good passes in their GCSEs, including English and Maths.

== Notable former pupils ==
- Oliver Norwood, footballer
- Ben McKenna, footballer
- Harvey Macadam, footballer
- Cody Frost, singer
- Shakira Khan, television personality

St Theodore's RC High School

- James Anderson, cricketer
- Stewart Binns, author and documentary maker
- Chris Casper, football manager
- Jonathan Clare, cricketer
- Vincent Fean, diplomat
- Peter Salmon, BBC executive
- Chris Scott, footballer
- Paul Scott, footballer
- Liam Spencer, artist
- Chris Turner, footballer
