= Chris Scott (English footballer) =

English footballer

Personal information
- Full name: Christopher James Scott
- Date of birth: 12 February 1980 (age 46)
- Place of birth: Burnley, England
- Height: 6 ft 2 in (1.88 m)
- Positions: Right-back; centre-back

Senior career*
Years	Team	Apps	(Gls)
1996–2001	Burnley	14	(0)
2000	→ Leigh RMI (loan)	7	(0)
2001–2003	Leigh RMI	14	(0)
- * Club domestic league appearances and goals

Christopher James Scott (born 12 February 1980) is an English former professional footballer who played as a defender in the Football League for Burnley.

== Early life ==
Scott was born in Burnley, Lancashire into a footballing family with strong links to Burnley. His father, grandfather, uncle and younger brother have all played for the club. He attended St Theodore's RC High School.

== Career ==
Scott started his career in 1996 when he was promoted from the youth team at Burnley. He played 14 matches in the Football League for the club, all during the 1998–99 season. His debut for the club came on 22 August 1998, when he came on as a substitute for Lee Howey in the 0–1 defeat to York City at Turf Moor. In September 2000, he joined Football Conference side Leigh RMI on a one-month loan deal and made eight appearances for the club.

After failing to properly break into the first team at Burnley, he had a trial in the United States in a bid to kickstart his career. Unfortunately his time was cut short after 4 weeks after a training ground incident which saw him assault 3 of his teammates. Upon his return to England he moved to Leigh RMI on a permanent basis in the summer of 2001. He stayed with the Railwaymen for two seasons, playing just 14 times in the league before leaving the club in May 2003.

In November 2004. it was announced that he had returned to Burnley in a non-playing role.
