= Billy Rodaway =

English footballer (born 1954)

Personal information
- Full name: William Vincent Rodaway
- Date of birth: 26 September 1954 (age 72)
- Place of birth: Liverpool, England
- Height: 5 ft 10 in (1.78 m)
- Position: Central defender

Senior career*
Years	Team	Apps	(Gls)
1971–1981	Burnley	203	(1)
1981–1983	Peterborough United	81	(0)
1983–1984	Blackpool	41	(0)
1984–1986	Tranmere Rovers	58	(5)
1986–1987	Burnley	44	(2)
1987–1988	Runcorn		
1988–19??	Colne Dynamoes		

Managerial career
- 1998: Accrington Stanley
- * Club domestic league appearances and goals

William Vincent Rodaway (born 26 September 1954) is an English former football player and manager. A central defender, he made more than 400 appearances in the Football League, playing for Burnley, Peterborough United, Blackpool and Tranmere Rovers. He later played non-league football for Runcorn, Altrincham and Colne Dynamoes, and also had non-playing roles at Halifax Town, Runcorn, Morecambe, Altrincham and Colne Dynamoes before a spell as Accrington Stanley manager in 1998.

== Playing career ==
Born in Liverpool, Rodaway played for England at schoolboy level. He started his career at Burnley, making his debut towards the end of the 1971–72 season, though it took until Colin Waldron's departure in 1976 for Rodaway to receive regular game time as a central defender. He left Burnley after the 1980–81 season, and joined Peterborough United on a free transfer. He later played for Blackpool and Tranmere Rovers. He returned to Burnley on a free transfer ahead of the 1986–87 season. He missed just two games across the season as Burnley finished 22nd in the Fourth Division, one point above relegated Lincoln City. He was released at the end of the season, and signed for Football Conference club Runcorn in July 1987. In January 1988, Runcorn agreed a swap deal with Altrincham where Rodaway would join Altrincham in exchange for Eddie Bishop, though to allow the transfer to go through more quickly, Rodaway and Bishop were made free agents by their clubs. Rodaway never completed his move to Altrincham however, and signed for Colne Dynamoes instead. He won the 1987–88 FA Vase with Colne. He became a player-coach whilst with Colne Dynamoes.

== Managerial career ==
Rodaway was appointed as assistant manager of Morecambe in August 1990, and left in summer 1992 to become assistant manager at Runcorn. He was assistant to John Carroll at Runcorn and moved to become his assistant at Halifax Town in April 1996, but left the club in February 1997. He later worked as a coach at Altrincham prior to being appointed manager of Accrington Stanley in April 1998. He was sacked in December following a 5–0 defeat to Bamber Bridge.
