= Peter Salmon (producer) =

British television producer (born 1956)

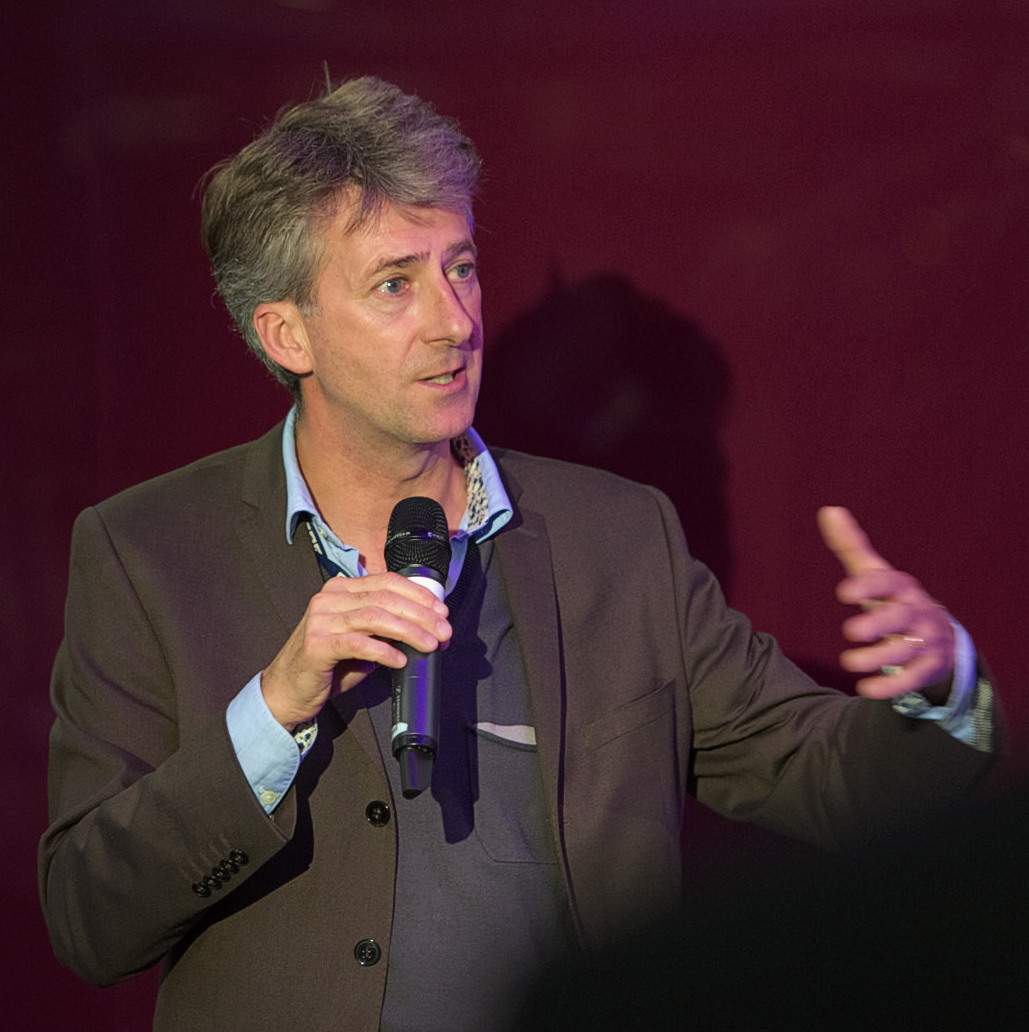
- Salmon at the Nations & Regions Media Conference in 2012
- Born: 15 May 1956 (age 69); Burnley, Lancashire, England
- Education: St Theodore's RC High School
- Alma mater: University of Warwick
- Employer(s): Endemol Shine Group; BBC; Channel 4 Granada Television
- Title: Controller of BBC One (1997–2000)
- Spouse: Sarah Lancashire (m. 2001)
- Children: 4

Peter Salmon (born 15 May 1956) is a British television producer and executive. He is Chief Creative Officer of global content creator, producer and distributor Endemol Shine Group, leading the company’s creative direction globally and overseeing the Group’s UK business. Prior to taking his current role in April 2016, Salmon was Director of BBC Studios, the corporation's production arm, and before that held a number of senior BBC roles including Chief Creative Officer of BBC Vision, effectively overseeing all of BBC television's in-house programme production, and Director of BBC North.

== Early life and career ==
Born in Burnley, Lancashire, Peter Derek Salmon studied at St Theodore's RC High School in the town and then the University of Warwick and graduated in 1977 with a degree in European literature. He then spent six months working for the Voluntary Service Overseas charity, as a teacher in Sarawak. However, he had to return home sooner than expected when his father became ill with lung cancer, and he worked for a time in factories in his native Burnley. His father subsequently recovered, and Salmon obtained a job as a British Government press officer, before going on, in 1978, to work as a junior reporter for the Chatham News and Standard newspaper, where he worked alongside Martin Brunt, now crime correspondent of Sky News. He is a fan of Burnley F.C.

== Career ==
=== Initial BBC career ===
In 1981 Salmon joined the staff of the BBC in London as one of six general trainees, alongside Kevin Lygo (now head of studios at ITV), multi-award-winning film-maker Peter Kosminsky and internet entrepreneur Dominic Cameron. In 1984 he was the director of the first dramatic reconstruction to be featured on the crime series Crimewatch, and he later went on to produce the programme. He also worked on the children's magazine show Blue Peter and the current affairs series Newsnight.

In 1989 he moved away from the central BBC in London to become the Head of Television Features at BBC Bristol. There he oversaw over forty environmental documentaries made by the BBC Natural History Unit, and was also responsible for forging the BBC's relationship with Bristol-based animation studio Aardman Animations, becoming an executive producer on the company's Academy Award-winning short film The Wrong Trousers (1993).

=== Channel 4 and Granada ===
In 1993 he left the BBC to take up a position as Head of Factual Programmes at Channel 4, having been specifically identified as a "rising star" by the channel's Chief Executive, Michael Grade. There he oversaw long-running documentary series such as Equinox and Cutting Edge, as well as his own commissions such as the controversial The Dying Rooms and The Red Light Zone, although the latter was much-criticised as over-sensationalist and lacking serious journalistic content. However, during his time in charge of Channel 4's factual programmes, the department won several British Academy Television Awards, Royal Television Society Awards, International Emmys and two successive Prix Italias.

During his time at Channel 4, Salmon was also responsible for overseeing the channel's annual Alternative Christmas Message, broadcast opposite Queen Elizabeth II's official message on BBC One and ITV every 25 December at 3pm. In 1994, Salmon attracted some criticism for choosing the controversial American civil rights campaigner Jesse Jackson to deliver the message.

He left Channel 4 in February 1996 to become Director of Programmes at Granada Television, one of the largest companies of the ITV network and one of the major providers of nationally-networked programming for the channel. During his time at Granada he oversaw successes such as the comedy drama Cold Feet (1997) and the docudrama Hillsborough (1996), although both of these had already been commissioned before he joined the company.

=== BBC One ===
In 1997 he left Granada after only twenty months to return to the BBC when the job of Controller of BBC One, the corporation's primary channel, became available. This vacancy had come as something of a surprise, resulting from Michael Jackson's sudden move to Channel 4 after just a year in charge. Salmon took charge of BBC One in September 1997.

Salmon rejoined the BBC at a difficult time, when it was losing many senior executives such as Jackson to rival broadcasters. Responsible for a £652 million annual programming budget, Salmon commissioned several successful programmes, such as the drama series Clocking Off (2000–03) and the sitcoms Dinnerladies (1998–2000) and My Family (2000–2011).

However, prior to the arrival of new Director-General of the BBC Greg Dyke in 2000, BBC One had suffered from under-investment, and for three successive years of Salmon's time in charge the channel was criticised in the annual report of the Board of Governors of the BBC for its performance and output. Dyke himself criticised the channel directly during the 2000 Edinburgh International Television Festival, firstly claiming it "had to do better" while delivering the annual MacTaggart Lecture, and then later criticising the policy of building lightweight drama series such as Harbour Lights (1999–2000) and Sunburn (1999–2000) around former soap opera stars. Salmon also found himself criticised in the media for rescheduling and cutting back on the annual number of editions of BBC One's flagship current affairs series Panorama. BBC One also saw its audience fall to record lows on several occasions during Salmon's period in charge.

Finally, on 13 September 2000, the BBC officially announced that Salmon was to leave BBC One to become the new Director of BBC Sport. His successor was eventually confirmed as being Lorraine Heggessey, who had been widely speculated as replacing Salmon even before his departure had been confirmed.

=== BBC Sport, Television Corporation and BBC Vision Productions ===
Salmon's new role saw the BBC's sports coverage across television, radio and online services being brought together under a single head of department for the first time. Although the BBC lost the prestigious television rights to The Boat Race in 2004 during Salmon's period in charge, the department was able to win back high-profile events such as the FA Cup (in 2001, after having previously lost the event to ITV in 1997), England football internationals (in 2001), and FA Premier League football highlights for Match of the Day (2004). He also oversaw the development of interactive television coverage of the Wimbledon tennis championships and the 2002 Commonwealth Games, and was in charge of the BBC's coverage of the prestigious 2002 FIFA World Cup, 2004 UEFA European Football Championship and 2004 Summer Olympics events. He was aided in these achievements by a large increase in the department's budget from Director-General Greg Dyke; in 2003 alone, BBC Sport was given a budget of £300 million.

In July 2005, he left the BBC to become the Chief Executive of the independent production company Television Corporation, producers of programmes such as The Hamburg Cell. However, when Television Corporation was taken over by the Welsh company Tinopolis, Salmon left the organisation. He returned to the BBC in 2006 to become Chief Creative Officer of the new "BBC Vision Productions" set-up, overseeing all creative output from the BBC's in-house production centres.

In December 2008 he became the director of BBC North Group Division, and in May 2014 was appointed Director of BBC England.

== Personal life ==
Salmon is married to the actress Sarah Lancashire.

Media offices
Preceded by Michael Jackson	Controller of BBC One; 1997-2000	Succeeded by Lorraine Heggessey
