= Paul Scott (footballer, born 1985) =

English footballer

Personal information
- Full name: Paul David Scott
- Date of birth: 29 January 1985 (age 41)
- Place of birth: Burnley, England
- Position: Defender

Senior career*
Years	Team	Apps	(Gls)
2003–2005	Burnley	2	(0)
- * Club domestic league appearances and goals

Paul David Scott (born 29 January 1985) is an English former professional footballer who played as a defender.

== Early life ==
Scott was born in Burnley, Lancashire into a football family with strong links to Burnley F.C. His father, grandfather and uncle and older brother have all played for the club. He attended St Theodore's RC High School.

== Career ==
He joined the youth team at Burnley in the summer of 2001, and in 2003 manager Stan Ternent promoted him into the first-team squad. In the 2003–04 season, he made two substitute appearances in the league for Burnley. His debut for the club came in the 4–0 defeat to Coventry City on 13 March 2004. Scott was released by Burnley at the end of the 2004–05 campaign and did not want to carry on a footballing career thereafter.
