= Tony Woodworth =

English footballer

Personal information
- Full name: Anthony David Woodworth
- Date of birth: 5 March 1968 (age 58)
- Place of birth: Manchester, England
- Height: 5 ft 10 in (1.78 m)
- Position: Goalkeeper

Youth career
- 1984–1986: Burnley

Senior career*
Years	Team	Apps	(Gls)
1986–1987	Burnley	1	(0)
- * Club domestic league appearances and goals

Anthony David Woodworth (born 5 March 1968) is an English former professional footballer who played as a goalkeeper. Born in Manchester, he joined the youth team at Burnley in 1984 and was promoted to the senior squad in December 1986. Woodworth made his only first-team appearance for Burnley in the 0–6 home defeat to Hereford United on 24 January 1987, deputising for the unavailable Joe Neenan. He was released in the summer of 1987 and subsequently moved into amateur football with Burnley United of the West Lancashire Football League.
