= Robert Regis =

English footballer

Personal information
- Full name: Robert Regis
- Date of birth: 24 January 1967 (age 59)
- Place of birth: Huddersfield, England
- Position: Striker

Senior career*
Years	Team	Apps	(Gls)
1985–1986	Huddersfield Town	0	(0)
1986–1987	Burnley	4	(1)
	Colne Dynamoes	?	(?)
- * Club domestic league appearances and goals

Robert Regis (born 24 January 1967) is an English former professional footballer who played as a striker. He played four games in the Football League for Burnley, scoring one goal.
