= Jason Harris (footballer, born 1969) =

English footballer (born 1969)

Jason Mark Harris (born 26 December 1969) is an English former professional association footballer who played as a midfielder. He played four matches in the Football League with Burnley, making his debut in the 3–1 victory over Lincoln City on 22 November 1986.
