= Shaun McGrory =

English footballer

Personal information
- Full name: Shaun McGrory
- Date of birth: 29 February 1968 (age 58)
- Place of birth: Coventry, England
- Position: Left back

Senior career*
Years	Team	Apps	(Gls)
1986–1987	Coventry City	20	(0)
1987–1990	Burnley	46	(2)
–	V.S. Rugby	–	(-)
–	Shepshed Dynamo	–	(-)
- * Club domestic league appearances and goals

Shaun McGrory (born 29 February 1968) is a former professional footballer who played as a left back.

McGrory left his hometown side Coventry and signed for then Football League Division Four side Burnley in 1987, making 59 first-team appearances in three seasons, including the 1988 Football League Trophy Final at Wembley Stadium, where they lost 2–0 to Wolves. McGrory was released by the Clarets in May 1990 and subsequently embarked on a career in non-league football.

== Honours ==
Burnley

- Associate Members' Cup runner-up: 1987–88
