= Mark Kendall (footballer, born 1958) =

Welsh footballer

Personal information
- Date of birth: 20 September 1958
- Place of birth: Blackwood, Wales
- Date of death: 1 May 2008 (aged 49)
- Place of death: Blackwood, Wales
- Height: 6 ft 0 in (1.83 m)
- Position: Goalkeeper

Youth career
- 1975–1976: Tottenham Hotspur

Senior career*
| Years | Team | Apps | (Gls) |
| 1976–1980 | Tottenham Hotspur | 29 | (0) |
| 1979 | → Chesterfield (loan) | 9 | (0) |
| 1980–1986 | Newport County | 272 | (0) |
| 1986–1990 | Wolverhampton Wanderers | 147 | (0) |
| 1990–1992 | Swansea City | 12 | (0) |
| 1991–1992 | → Burnley (loan) | 2 | (0) |
| 1992–1993 | Ebbw Vale | 1 | (0) |
| 2000–2001 | Cwmbran Town | 1 | (0) |
| Total | | 473 | (0) |

International career
- Wales U21
- * Club domestic league appearances and goals

Mark Kendall (20 September 1958 – 1 May 2008) was a Welsh footballer who played as a goalkeeper. He represented his country at schoolboy, youth and Under-21 level.

== Career ==
Kendall, a goalkeeper, joined Tottenham Hotspur as an apprentice in March 1975, aged 16. He signed professional forms in July 1976, and went on to make his league debut on 4 November 1978 in a 2–2 draw at Norwich.

However, although he spent four seasons with Spurs, he never managed to make the goalkeeper's position his own. His final full season on the club's books saw him spend a nine-game loan period, during which he saved penalties from Steve Neville of Exeter City and Mark Smith of Sheffield Wednesday, at Division 3 Chesterfield, returning to Tottenham after Milija Aleksic was injured during an FA Cup-tie against Manchester United.

He signed for Newport County then of Division 3 for a club record £45,000 in September 1980 during the most successful period in the club's long history. Kendall was part of the team that won promotion and the Welsh Cup and in the subsequent season reached the quarter-final of the 1981 European Cup Winners Cup.

He left Newport as they headed for relegation to Division 4, for Wolverhampton Wanderers in January 1986. Upon joining, Wolves were languishing in the fourth tier, but Kendall became an ever-present part of the side that went on to win back-to-back promotions and lift the Football League Trophy at Wembley. His tally of 28 clean sheets during a season (set in 1987/88) is a club record.

The goalkeeper returned to his native Wales after 4 years at Molineux, joining Swansea City in Summer 1990. He won a second Welsh Cup of his career, but was largely only a back-up goalkeeper during his time with the Swans. He played in the European Cup Winners Cup tie against Monaco in 1991 when the rules stated that teams could only field 3 foreigners and Swansea had to find 12 Welshmen among their players, the second leg ending in a 0–8 defeat.

His two seasons with the club saw him play 12 league games, a spell which also saw him loaned out to Burnley to gain playing time. However, after keeping a clean sheet in his first appearance for the Clarets, he conceded 5 (at Blackpool) in his second which saw his loan ended.

== Post-football ==
Kendall retired from professional football aged 34 and became a police officer in the Gwent constabulary. He moved into training in 2003 and was named national police trainer of the year in 2007. He came out of playing retirement in 2000 though, and made a further Welsh Premier League appearance as he played for Cwmbran against Barry Town, who fielded his son Lee Kendall in goal.

On 1 May 2008, Kendall collapsed and died at his home, aged 49.

== Honours ==
Wolverhampton Wanderers

- Football League Third Division: 1988–89
- Football League Fourth Division: 1987–88
- Associate Members' Cup: 1987–88

Individual

- PFA Team of the Year: 1987–88 Fourth Division
