= Dave Miller (footballer, born 1964) =

English footballer and manager

Personal information
- Full name: David Brian Miller
- Date of birth: 8 January 1964 (age 62)
- Place of birth: Burnley, England
- Height: 5 ft 11 in (1.80 m)
- Position: Defender

Senior career*
Years	Team	Apps	(Gls)
1982–1985	Burnley	32	(3)
1983	→ Crewe Alexandra (loan)	3	(0)
1985–1986	Tranmere Rovers	29	(1)
1986–1987	Colne Dynamoes	?	(?)
1987–1989	Preston North End	58	(2)
1989	→ Burnley (loan)	4	(0)
1989–1992	Carlisle United	109	(7)
1992–1994	Stockport County	81	(1)
1994–1996	Wigan Athletic	38	(3)
1996–1999	Morecambe	30	(1)

Managerial career
- 2002–2005: Stalybridge Celtic
- * Club domestic league appearances and goals

David Brian Miller (born 8 January 1964) is an English former professional footballer who played as a defender. He played for seven different clubs in the Football League, including Wigan Athletic during Dave Whelan's takeover of the club, as well as having two spells in non-league football. He is the son of former Burnley player and manager Brian Miller, brother-in-law of teammate and club captain Derek Scott and uncle of Chris and Paul Scott who also played for Burnley.

== Honours ==
Stockport County

- Football League Trophy runner-up: 1992–93
