= Steve Gardner (footballer, born 1968) =

English footballer

Personal information
- Full name: Stephen George Gardner
- Date of birth: 3 July 1968 (age 58)
- Place of birth: Middlesbrough, England
- Position: Centre-back

Youth career
- 1986–1987: Manchester United

Senior career*
Years	Team	Apps	(Gls)
1987–1990	Burnley	95	(0)
1991–1991	Bradford City	14	(0)
1992	Bury	1	(0)
- * Club domestic league appearances and goals

Stephen George Gardner (born 3 July 1968) is a former professional footballer who played as a central defender.

After starting as a member of the youth team at Manchester United, Gardner signed for then Football League Division Four side Burnley in 1987, making 115 first-team appearances in three seasons, including the 1988 Football League Trophy Final at Wembley Stadium, where they lost 2–0 to Wolves. Gardner was released by the Clarets in May 1990 and eventually signed for Bradford City in 1991, where he made 14 league appearances. After being released by Bradford, Gardner joined Bury but made only one league appearance and subsequently retired from professional football.

== Honours ==
Burnley

- Associate Members' Cup runner-up: 1987–88
