= Michael Southern =

English footballer

Personal information
- Date of birth: 31 October 1968 (age 57)
- Place of birth: Lytham St Annes, England
- Position: Defender

Senior career*
Years	Team	Apps	(Gls)
1985–1987	Burnley	0	(0)
- * Club domestic league appearances and goals

Michael Southern (born 31 October 1968) is an English former professional footballer who played as a central defender. He played for Burnley between 1985 and 1987. His only competitive senior appearance came in the 0–2 defeat to Bolton Wanderers in the Associate Members' Cup on 16 December 1986.
