= Ian Britton (Scottish footballer) =

Scottish footballer

Personal information
- Full name: Ian Britton
- Date of birth: 19 May 1954
- Place of birth: Dundee, Scotland
- Date of death: 31 March 2016 (aged 61)
- Place of death: Burnley, England
- Height: 5 ft 5 in (1.65 m)
- Position: Midfielder

Youth career
- 1971–1972: Chelsea

Senior career*
Years	Team	Apps	(Gls)
1972–1982	Chelsea	263	(33)
1982–1983	Dundee United	10	(1)
1983	Arbroath	2	(0)
1983–1986	Blackpool	106	(15)
1986–1989	Burnley	108	(10)
1989	Morecambe		

Managerial career
- 1996–1998: Nelson (player-manager)
- * Club domestic league appearances and goals

Ian Britton (19 May 1954 – 31 March 2016) was a Scottish footballer who played as a midfielder for clubs in England and Scotland, including Chelsea, Blackpool and Burnley.

== Playing career ==
=== Chelsea ===
Britton started his career with Scottish amateur side Hillside Rangers. Aged 17 he signed as an apprentice with Londoners Chelsea in the summer of 1971, making his debut during the 1972–73 season against Derby County on 30 December 1972. With Chelsea's relegation from the First Division in 1975, which saw the departure of many of the club's established players, Britton became a regular in the first team. He was a key part of manager Eddie McCreadie's young side, alongside the likes of Ray Wilkins, Steve Finnieston and Tommy Langley, which won promotion back to the top flight in 1976–77.

Chelsea were relegated once again following the 1978–79 season and remained in the old Second Division for the remainder of his time at Stamford Bridge, which came to an end in August 1982 when he returned to his home town and signed for Dundee United. In total, he played 289 games and scored 34 goals for Chelsea.

=== Dundee United ===
As a Dundee United player in the 1982–83 season, Britton helped the club win the Scottish league championship for the only time in their history. His only league goal came in a 3–3 draw with Hibernian on 26 March 1983. He also scored against Raith Rovers in the League Cup on 21 August 1982.

=== Blackpool ===
After playing two games for Arbroath at the start of the 1983–84 season, Britton joined Blackpool in November on a one-month loan deal. He impressed manager Sam Ellis, who signed him permanently for a small fee when his loan period expired.

In his first season at Bloomfield Road, his goal tally was bettered only by Paul Stewart, and his best period came when he teamed up in midfield with Mike Conroy.

Britton was in the Blackpool side that won promotion from the Fourth Division in 1985, swapping places with his next club Burnley, whom he joined in August 1986. But, such were the finances at Turf Moor, that manager Brian Miller was initially only able to sign him on loan.

=== Burnley ===
Britton's headed goal for Burnley, three minutes into the second half of the final game of the 1986–87 season, secured a 2–1 win over promotion chasing Orient, helping to preserve Burnley's Football League status.

Many of the side that played against Orient were subsequently released. Britton was one of only two members of that team to feature in the starting eleven at Wembley just one year later the other being Ray Deakin, when the Clarets faced Wolverhampton Wanderers in the Associate Members' Cup Final in front of 80,841 fans, a then-record for the trophy.

The 1988–89 season proved to be Britton's last in League football. He had scored his first goal for Burnley in a 2–1 defeat at Tranmere Rovers, and in January 1989 he scored at Prenton Park once again in what proved to be manager Brian Miller's final game in charge. Miller was replaced by Frank Casper and although Britton remained in the side for much of the remainder of the season, he was released at the end of his third year with the club.

== Retirement ==
Having ended his professional career, Britton became involved in local semi-professional football, briefly managing Nelson in the mid-1990s. He lived in East Lancashire where he was the manager of the Seedhill Athletics and Fitness Centre operated by Pendle Leisure Trust.

On 31 March 2016, it was reported that Britton had died of cancer at Pendleside Hospice in Burnley the age of 61.

== Honours ==
Burnley

- Associate Members' Cup runner-up: 1987–88
