= Phil Murphy (footballer) =

English footballer

Personal information
- Full name: Philip Murphy
- Date of birth: 21 November 1960 (age 65)
- Place of birth: Liverpool, England
- Position: Striker

Senior career*
Years	Team	Apps	(Gls)
1982–1984	Nacional Madeira		
1984–1985	Blackpool	8	(0)
1985–1986	Nacional Madeira	?	(?)
1986	Witton Albion	?	(?)
1986–1987	Burnley	15	(5)
1987–1990	Nacional Madeira	43	(10)
	Workington	?	(?)
- * Club domestic league appearances and goals

Philip Murphy (born 21 November 1960) is an English former professional footballer who played as a striker.
