= Jim Heggarty =

Northern Ireland footballer

Personal information
- Full name: James Patrick Heggarty
- Date of birth: 4 August 1965 (age 61)
- Place of birth: Larne, Northern Ireland
- Height: 6 ft 2 in (1.88 m)
- Position: Centre back

Senior career*
Years	Team	Apps	(Gls)
1984–1985	Brighton & Hove Albion	0	(0)
1985–1986	Burnley	36	(1)
- Worthing
- * Club domestic league appearances and goals

James Patrick Heggarty (born 4 August 1965) is a Northern Irish former professional footballer who played in the Football League for Burnley.
