= Andy Robinson (footballer, born 1966) =

English footballer

Personal information
- Full name: Andrew Craig Robinson
- Date of birth: 10 March 1966 (age 60)
- Place of birth: Oldham, England
- Height: 5 ft 10 in (1.78 m)
- Position: Midfielder

Senior career*
Years	Team	Apps	(Gls)
1985–1986	Manchester United	0	(0)
1985	→ Burnley (loan)	5	(1)
1986–1987	Bury	19	(0)
1987–1988	Carlisle United	46	(3)
1988–1991	Wycombe Wanderers	101	(6)
1991–1994	Aylesbury United	85	(12)
Total		256	(22)
- * Club domestic league appearances and goals

Andrew Craig Robinson (born 10 March 1966) is an English former professional footballer who played as a midfielder. He made 70 appearances in the Football League playing for Burnley, Bury and Carlisle United, and also played non-league football for Wycombe Wanderers and Aylesbury United.

== Honours ==
Wycombe Wanderers

- FA Trophy: 1990–91
