= Peter Leebrook =

English footballer

Personal information
- Full name: Peter David Leebrook
- Date of birth: 18 September 1968 (age 58)
- Place of birth: Saltburn-by-the-Sea, England
- Position: Full back

Senior career*
Years	Team	Apps	(Gls)
1986–1988	Burnley	52	(0)
1988–1989	Aldershot	0	(0)
- V.S. Rugby
- * Club domestic league appearances and goals

Peter David Leebrook (born 18 September 1968) is an English former professional footballer who played as a full back. He played more than 50 matches in the Football League for Burnley.

Upon retiring as a professional player, Leebrook emigrated to Arizona and was involved with soccer there for 15 years. He then moved to Halifax, Canada to be Technical Director of Halifax City Soccer Club of Nova Scotia, having previously been the club's first team manager. Since then he has moved back to Phoenix, Arizona as is again involved with SC Del Sol as their Assistant Director of Coaching.
