= Paul Comstive =

English footballer (1961–2013)

Personal information
- Full name: Paul Thomas Comstive
- Date of birth: 25 November 1961
- Place of birth: Southport, England
- Date of death: 29 December 2013 (aged 52)
- Place of death: Southport, England
- Positions: Midfielder; full-back

Youth career
- 1978–1979: Blackburn Rovers

Senior career*
Years	Team	Apps	(Gls)
1979–1983	Blackburn Rovers	6	(0)
1982	→ Rochdale (loan)	6	(2)
1983	→ Rochdale (loan)	3	(0)
1983–1984	Wigan Athletic	35	(2)
1984–1987	Wrexham	99	(8)
1987–1989	Burnley	82	(17)
1989–1991	Bolton Wanderers	49	(3)
1991–1993	Chester City	57	(6)
1993–1995	Southport	61	(11)
1995–1996	Morecambe	28	(1)
1996–?	Chorley		
Total		426	(58)
- * Club domestic league appearances and goals

Paul Comstive (25 November 1961 – 29 December 2013) was an English professional footballer who mainly played as a midfielder. He played in the Football League for seven different clubs and also played non-league football.

== Playing career ==
Born in Southport, Comstive was to spend the vast majority of his career in the north-west of England, beginning as an apprentice at Blackburn Rovers in October 1979. He went on to make six league appearances for Rovers, with two loan spells with Rochdale following before a move to Wigan Athletic in August 1983.

After a three-year stint with Wrexham from 1984 to 1987, Comstive made an £8,000 switch to Burnley. This spell saw him play at Wembley Stadium in the 1988 Associate Members' Cup Final against Wolverhampton Wanderers.

Comstive moved on again in 1989 to Bolton Wanderers for £37,000, with his two seasons at Burnden Park ending in losses in the Third Division play–offs. Two of the three goals he scored for Bolton came direct from corner kicks in the 4–1 home win against Bournemouth in January 1991. Later that year he was to help Wanderers towards the divisional Play-offs where they eventually lost out to Tranmere Rovers at Wembley Stadium. In November 1991 Comstive moved to Chester City for £10,000. He scored in the first Football League match at the Deva Stadium between Chester and Burnley on 5 September 1992 but was released at the end of the 1992–93 season. Many of his appearances for Chester came at full-back.

This marked the end of Comstive's professional career. He joined hometown club Southport and went on to play for fellow non-league clubs Morecambe and Chorley. Comstive had a short spell on the coaching staff at Southport and also worked for Burscough. He later worked at Fleetwood Hesketh FC and at Royal Mail as a postman.

On 29 December 2013, he died suddenly following a heart attack.

== Honours ==
Burnley

- Associate Members' Cup runner-up: 1987–88
