= Robbie Dennison =

Northern Irish footballer

Personal information
- Full name: Robert Dennison
- Date of birth: 30 April 1963 (age 63)
- Place of birth: Banbridge, Northern Ireland
- Height: 5 ft 7 in (1.70 m)
- Position: Winger

Senior career*
Years	Team	Apps	(Gls)
1979–1985	Glenavon		
1985–1987	West Bromwich Albion	16	(1)
1987–1997	Wolverhampton Wanderers	293	(40)
1995	→ Swansea City (loan)	9	(0)
1997–1998	Hednesford Town	35	(4)
1998–1999	Hereford United	19	(2)

International career
1987	Northern Ireland B	3	(0)
1988–1997	Northern Ireland	18	(0)

Managerial career
- 2000: Warley Rangers (player/manager)
- * Club domestic league appearances and goals

Robert Dennison (born 30 April 1963) is a Northern Irish former professional footballer who spent the majority of his career at Wolverhampton Wanderers.

== Career ==
West Bromwich Albion spotted Dennison at Irish club Glenavon and signed him on a two-year deal in September 1985. However, he failed to establish himself in the starting line-up and signed for rivals Wolverhampton Wanderers for £20,000 in March 1987. He made his debut for the club on 14 March 1987 in a 4–0 win over Swansea City.

Here, the winger found his feet and was a first choice player as the team won back to back promotions from the (old) Division 4. Dennison also won an Associate Members' Cup winners medal, scoring in the 2–0 final win over Burnley in 1988.

He also appeared for the club at Wembley in the Football League Centenary Tournament just a month earlier, scoring a long range goal against Everton. He made over 300 appearances in total for Wolves, scoring 49 times.

His appearances began to become more limited with the arrival of Graham Taylor at Molineux in the mid-1990s and he went on loan to Swansea City in 1995, before moving to non-league Hednesford Town in 1997 and in 1999 had a brief spell with Halesowen Town. He rejoined with one-time boss Graham Turner at Hereford United, and later became player/manager at Warley Rangers.

Dennison made 18 appearances for Northern Ireland, spread over a 10-year period. His debut came on 27 April 1988 in a goalless friendly with France.

His brother David also represented Northern Ireland, not at football but at cricket.

Since retiring, he formed a sports trophy business and currently provides co-commentary on Wolves matches live on Beacon Radio.

== Honours ==
Wolverhampton Wanderers

- Football League Third Division: 1988–89
- Football League Fourth Division: 1987–88
- Associate Members' Cup: 1987–88
