= Neil Edwards (footballer, born 1967) =

English footballer

Personal information
- Full name: Neil Robert Edwards
- Date of birth: 2 July 1967 (age 59)
- Place of birth: Liverpool, England
- Position: Striker

Senior career*
Years	Team	Apps	(Gls)
1984–1985	Liverpool	0	(0)
1985–1986	Burnley	1	(0)
- * Club domestic league appearances and goals

Neil Robert Edwards (born 2 July 1967) is an English former professional association footballer who played as a striker. He played one match in the Football League for Burnley.
