= Derrick Parker =

English footballer (born 1957)

Personal information
- Date of birth: 7 February 1957 (age 69)
- Place of birth: Wallsend, England
- Height: 5 ft 10 in (1.78 m)
- Position: Striker

Youth career
- Wallsend Boys Club

Senior career*
Years	Team	Apps	(Gls)
1974–1977	Burnley	6	(2)
1977–1980	Southend United	129	(43)
1980–1983	Barnsley	107	(32)
1983–1985	Oldham Athletic	57	(11)
1984	Doncaster Rovers	5	(1)
1985–1987	Burnley	43	(10)
1987	Haka Valkeakoski	6	(2)
1987–1988	Rochdale	7	(1)
	North Ferriby United	?	(?)
	Altrincham	?	(?)
	Northwich Victoria	?	(?)
	Frickley Athletic	?	(?)
1991	Hyde United	3	(1)
	Bishop Auckland	?	(?)
	Irlam Town	?	(?)
	Ossett Town	?	(?)
- * Club domestic league appearances and goals

Derrick Parker (born 7 February 1957) is an English retired professional footballer who played as a striker. He played for six different teams in the Football League during his career, as well as having a spell in Finland with Haka Valkeakoski. He also played for several non-league clubs.

== Playing career ==
Parker's career began in 1974 when he was promoted from the youths to the first team at Burnley. He played six matches in three years for Burnley, and scored two goals, before moving to Southend United in 1977. He was a first-team regular at Roots Hall, making 129 league appearances in just three seasons and scoring 43 goals in the process.

His performances for Southend earned him a transfer to Barnsley in February 1980. He played over 100 league games for the club before joining Oldham Athletic in August 1983. He stayed at Boundary Park for two seasons and made more than 50 league appearances for the club. After leaving Oldham in 1985, Parker had a short spell at Doncaster Rovers, where he played just five matches before returning to his first club, Burnley, in 1985.

During his second spell at Turf Moor, Parker played 43 times in the league, scoring ten goals for the side. Along with a number of other players, he left the club in the summer of 1987 after the team had narrowly avoided relegation from the Football League Fourth Division with a last-day victory over Orient. Unable to find a club in England, Parker joined Finnish outfit Haka Valkeakoski. However, his stay in Finland was short-lived as he joined Rochdale midway through the 1987–88 season. He was released when the club hit a financial crisis in December 1987 having played seven league games in that time.

He had stints at North Ferriby United, Altrincham, Northwich Victoria and Frickley Athletic before joining Hyde United in 1991. He played three league matches and scored one goal for the club, before leaving to sign for Bishop Auckland. After quitting Bishop Auckland, Parker had spells at Irlam Town and Ossett Town before retiring from the game and moving back to live in Barnsley. He now provides commentary on Barnsley games for local radio
