= Darren Heesom =

English footballer

Personal information
- Full name: Darren Lea Heesom
- Date of birth: 8 May 1968 (age 58)
- Place of birth: Warrington, England
- Height: 5 ft 8 in (1.73 m)
- Position: Full back

Senior career*
| Years | Team | Apps | (Gls) |
| 1985–1987 | Burnley | 38 | (1) |
| 1992 | Hyde United | 11 | (0) |
- * Club domestic league appearances and goals

Darren Lea Heesom (born 8 May 1968) is an English former professional footballer. He played 38 matches in the Football League for Burnley before having spells with a number of non-league clubs, including Altrincham, Macclesfield Town and Southport.
