= Phil Devaney =

English footballer

Personal information
- Full name: Philip Charles Devaney
- Date of birth: 12 February 1969 (age 57)
- Place of birth: Huyton, England
- Position: Striker

Senior career*
Years	Team	Apps	(Gls)
1985–1988	Burnley	13	(1)
- * Club domestic league appearances and goals

Philip Charles Devaney (born 12 February 1969) is an English former professional association footballer who played as a striker.
