= Andy Farrell (footballer) =

English footballer

Personal information
- Full name: Andrew James Farrell
- Date of birth: 7 October 1965 (age 61)
- Place of birth: Colchester, England
- Position: Midfielder

Senior career*
Years	Team	Apps	(Gls)
1983–1987	Colchester United	105	(5)
1987–1994	Burnley	257	(19)
1994–1996	Wigan Athletic	54	(1)
1996–1999	Rochdale	118	(6)
1999–2000	Morecambe	31	(0)
2000–2002	Leigh RMI	64	(0)
- * Club domestic league appearances and goals

Andrew James Farrell (born 7 October 1965) is an English former professional footballer who played as a midfielder in the Football League for Colchester United, Burnley, Wigan Athletic and Rochdale.

== Career ==
Farrell's career began with hometown club Colchester United, making over 100 league appearances, before he moved on to play over 300 games for the Burnley, becoming the only player in the club's history to appear in two Wembley finals and wear numbers one to 11 during his time at Turf Moor. He went on to make appearances for Wigan Athletic, Rochdale, Morecambe and Leigh RMI before launching his coaching career. Farrell returned to Turf Moor to work in the club's community scheme and coach in the centre of excellence. He was then taken onto the full-time staff as assistant to youth coach Terry Pashley. As an 'A' licence qualified coach, Farrell is now a key part of the Clarets' youth set-up in helping nurture potential future professional players at Burnley.

== Honours ==
Burnley

- Football League Second Division play-offs: 1994
- Football League Fourth Division: 1991–92
- Associate Members' Cup runner-up: 1987–88
