= Phil Malley =

English footballer

Personal information
- Full name: Philip Malley
- Date of birth: 1 November 1965 (age 60)
- Place of birth: Felling, Gateshead, England
- Height: 5 ft 8 in (1.73 m)
- Position: Midfielder

Youth career
- Sunderland

Senior career*
Years	Team	Apps	(Gls)
1983–1984	Hartlepool United	1	(0)
1984	Berwick Rangers	1	(0)
1984–1988	Burnley	95	(5)
1984	→ Stockport County (loan)	3	(0)
- Morecambe
- * Club domestic league appearances and goals

Philip Malley (born 1 November 1965) is an English former professional footballer who made 99 appearances in the Football League playing as a midfielder for Hartlepool United, Burnley and Stockport County.
