= George Oghani =

English footballer

Personal information
- Full name: George William Oghani
- Date of birth: 2 September 1960 (age 66)
- Place of birth: Manchester, England
- Height: 5 ft 11 in (1.80 m)
- Position: Striker

Youth career
- ?–1978: Sheffield United

Senior career*
Years	Team	Apps	(Gls)
1977–1978	Bury	0	(0)
1978–1983	Hyde United	175	(83)
1983–1987	Bolton Wanderers	99	(27)
1987	→ Wrexham (loan)	7	(0)
1987–1989	Burnley	74	(21)
1989	Stockport County	8	(2)
1989	Hereford United	8	(2)
1989–1990	Hyde United	1	(0)
1990–1991	Scarborough	50	(18)
1991–1992	AEP Paphos FC	25	(4)
1992–1994	Carlisle United	53	(15)
1994–1996	Northwich Victoria	60	(13)
1996–1997	Guiseley	?	(?)
- * Club domestic league appearances and goals

George William Oghani (born 2 September 1960) is an English former footballer.

== Career ==
Born in Manchester, England, he played for Sheffield United, Bury, Hyde United, Bolton Wanderers (where he became the first black person to play for their first team), Wrexham, Burnley, Stockport County, Hereford United, Hyde United for a second time where he scored 78 goals in 145 appearances, Scarborough, AEP Paphos FC and Carlisle United.

== Honours ==
Bolton Wanderers

- Associate Members' Cup runner-up: 1985–86

Burnley

- Associate Members' Cup runner-up: 1987–88
