= Joe Neenan =

English footballer

Personal information
- Full name: Joseph Patrick Neenan
- Date of birth: 17 March 1959 (age 67)
- Place of birth: Manchester, England
- Height: 6 ft 2 in (1.88 m)
- Position: Goalkeeper

Senior career*
Years	Team	Apps	(Gls)
1976–1980	York City	56	(0)
1980–1985	Scunthorpe United	191	(0)
1985	→ Burnley (loan)	9	(0)
1985–1987	Burnley	81	(0)
1987–1989	Peterborough United	55	(0)
1988	→ Scarborough (loan)	6	(0)
- * Club domestic league appearances and goals

Joseph Patrick Neenan (born 17 March 1959) is an English former professional footballer who made 398 appearances in the Football League as a goalkeeper for York City, Scunthorpe United, Burnley, Peterborough United and Scarborough.
