= Ashley Hoskin =

English footballer

Personal information
- Full name: James Ashley Hoskin
- Date of birth: 27 March 1968 (age 58)
- Place of birth: Accrington, England
- Position: Winger

Senior career*
Years	Team	Apps	(Gls)
1985–1989	Burnley	88	(11)

Managerial career
- 2015: Colwyn Bay
- * Club domestic league appearances and goals

James Ashley Hoskin (born 27 March 1968) is an English former professional footballer who played as a winger.

Hoskin scored in the 1987–88 Football League Trophy Northern Area final second leg against Preston North End but was not played in the final against Wolverhampton Wanderers at Wembley Stadium.

Hoskin was the development and reserve team coach for Burnley for season 2010–11 but left on 13 May.

In May 2015 he was appointed manager of Colwyn Bay, having previously held coaching roles at Burnley and Bury.
