= Brian Miller (footballer) =

English footballer and manager

Personal information
- Full name: Brian George Miller
- Date of birth: 19 January 1937
- Place of birth: Hapton, Lancashire, England
- Date of death: 7 April 2007 (aged 70)
- Place of death: Burnley, Lancashire, England
- Height: 6 ft 1 in (1.85 m)
- Position: Wing half

Senior career*
Years	Team	Apps	(Gls)
1954–1967	Burnley	379	(29)

International career
1961	England	1	(0)

Managerial career
- 1979–1983: Burnley
- 1986–1989: Burnley
- * Club domestic league appearances and goals

Brian George Miller (19 January 1937 – 7 April 2007) was an English professional footballer and England international who played as a wing half.

Born in Hapton, Lancashire, Miller played only for Burnley during his career. He won his only international cap on 27 May 1961 in a 3–1 defeat to Austria.

He managed the Clarets between 1979 and 1983 and between 1986 and 1989. He helped them win the Third Division title during his first spell.

Miller died peacefully surrounded by his family in Burnley General Hospital at the age of 70 following a short illness. Miller spent five weeks in Burnley General Hospital with the illness before he died. A minute's silence in memory of Miller was observed prior to Burnley's game against Cardiff City on 9 April 2007.

During his first spell as manager at Burnley his son Dave played for Burnley and his daughter married club captain Derek Scott. Their sons, Chris and Paul, also played for the club.

== Honours ==
=== Player ===
Burnley

- Football League First Division: 1959–60
- FA Cup runner-up: 1961–62

=== Manager ===
Burnley

- Football League Third Division: 1981–82
- Associate Members' Cup runner-up: 1987–88
