= 1987–88 Associate Members' Cup =

1987–88 Associate Members Cup
Sherpa Van Trophy

Tournament details
- Country: England; Wales

The 1987–88 Associate Members' Cup, known as the 1987–88 Sherpa Van Trophy for sponsorship reasons, was the seventh staging of a secondary football league tournament, and the fifth staging of the Associate Members' Cup, a knockout competition for English football clubs in the Third and Fourth Divisions (now known as League One and Two).

The winners were Wolverhampton Wanderers, who defeated Burnley 2–0 in the final. This marked the first time two former English champions met in the final of the competition. Wolves became the first former champions to win the trophy, followed by Portsmouth in 2019 and Sunderland in 2021.

The competition began on 13 October 1987 and ended with the final on 29 May 1988. The tournament begins with clubs divided into a Northern and a Southern section, and teams entering a preliminary group stage. Each section then gradually eliminates the qualifying teams in knock-out fashion until each has a winning finalist. At this point, the two winning finalists faced each other in the combined final for the honour of the trophy.

== Preliminary round ==
=== Northern Section ===
Group 1
Team	Pld	W	D	L	GF	GA	GD	Pts
Burnley	2	2	0	0	5	3	+2	6
Rochdale	2	0	1	1	2	3	−1	1
Tranmere Rovers	2	0	1	1	1	2	−1	1

Date	Team 1	Score	Team 2
Oct 13	Rochdale	0–0	Tranmere Rovers
Oct 27	Tranmere Rovers	1–2	Burnley
Nov 24	Burnley	3–2	Rochdale

Group 2
Team	Pld	W	D	L	GF	GA	GD	Pts
Carlisle United	2	2	0	0	3	1	+2	6
Chester City	2	1	0	1	3	3	0	3
Blackpool	2	0	0	2	1	3	−2	0

Date	Team 1	Score	Team 2
Oct 13	Carlisle United	2–1	Chester City
Oct 28	Chester City	2–1	Blackpool
Nov 24	Blackpool	0–1	Carlisle United

Group 3
Team	Pld	W	D	L	GF	GA	GD	Pts
Preston North End	2	1	1	0	5	2	+3	4
Bolton Wanderers	2	1	1	0	3	1	+2	4
Stockport County	2	0	0	2	3	8	−5	0

Date	Team 1	Score	Team 2
Oct 13	Bolton Wanderers	0–0	Preston NE
Oct 27	Preston NE	5–2	Stockport County
Nov 24	Stockport County	1–3	Bolton Wanderers

Group 4
Team	Pld	W	D	L	GF	GA	GD	Pts
Bury	2	1	1	0	5	2	+3	4
Crewe Alexandra	2	0	2	0	2	2	0	2
Wigan Athletic	2	0	1	1	4	7	−3	1

Date	Team 1	Score	Team 2
Oct 13	Wigan Athletic	2–2	Crewe Alexandra
Nov 24	Bury	5–2	Wigan Athletic
Dec 04	Crewe Alexandra	0–0	Bury

Group 5
Team	Pld	W	D	L	GF	GA	GD	Pts
Darlington	2	2	0	0	6	4	+2	6
Chesterfield	2	1	0	1	3	2	+1	3
York City	2	0	0	2	3	6	−3	0

Date	Team 1	Score	Team 2
Oct 13	York City	3–4	Darlington
Nov 24	Chesterfield	2–0	York City
Dec 05	Darlington	2–1	Chesterfield

Group 6
Team	Pld	W	D	L	GF	GA	GD	Pts
Sunderland	2	2	0	0	10	1	+9	6
Rotherham United	2	1	0	1	2	7	−5	3
Scarborough	2	0	0	2	0	4	−4	0

Date	Team 1	Score	Team 2
Oct 13	Rotherham United	1–0	Scarborough
Oct 28	Scarborough	0–3	Sunderland
Nov 24	Sunderland	7–1	Rotherham United

Group 7
Team	Pld	W	D	L	GF	GA	GD	Pts
Halifax Town	2	1	0	1	4	2	+2	3
Scunthorpe United	2	1	0	1	2	3	−1	3
Grimsby Town	2	1	0	1	2	3	−1	3

Date	Team 1	Score	Team 2
Oct 13	Scunthorpe United	2–0	Grimsby Town
Oct 27	Grimsby Town	2–1	Halifax Town
Nov 24	Halifax Town	3–0	Scunthorpe United
Play-off to determine second place:
Dec 15	Grimsby Town	1–2	Scunthorpe United

Group 8
Team	Pld	W	D	L	GF	GA	GD	Pts
Mansfield Town	2	2	0	0	4	2	+2	6
Hartlepool United	2	1	0	1	3	3	0	3
Doncaster Rovers	2	0	0	2	0	2	−2	0

Date	Team 1	Score	Team 2
Oct 13	Doncaster Rovers	0–1	Mansfield Town
Oct 27	Mansfield Town	3–2	Hartlepool United
Nov 24	Hartlepool United	1–0	Doncaster Rovers

=== Southern Section ===
Group 1
Team	Pld	W	D	L	GF	GA	GD	Pts
Brentford	2	1	0	1	3	3	0	3
Notts County	2	1	0	1	3	3	0	3
Northampton Town	2	1	0	1	1	1	0	3

Date	Team 1	Score	Team 2
Oct 13	Notts County	1–0	Northampton Town
Oct 28	Northampton Town	1–0	Brentford
Nov 24	Brentford	3–2	Notts County

Group 2
Team	Pld	W	D	L	GF	GA	GD	Pts
Walsall	2	1	1	0	5	3	+2	4
Cardiff City	2	1	0	1	4	5	−1	3
Wrexham	2	0	1	1	4	5	−1	1

Date	Team 1	Score	Team 2
Oct 13	Cardiff City	3–2	Wrexham
Oct 27	Wrexham	2–2	Walsall
Nov 24	Walsall	3–1	Cardiff City

Group 3
Team	Pld	W	D	L	GF	GA	GD	Pts
Aldershot	2	1	1	0	5	3	+2	4
Leyton Orient	2	0	2	0	4	4	0	2
Gillingham	2	0	1	1	3	5	−2	1

Date	Team 1	Score	Team 2
Oct 13	Aldershot	3–1	Gillingham
Oct 27	Gillingham	2–2	Leyton Orient
Nov 24	Leyton Orient	2–2	Aldershot

Group 4
Team	Pld	W	D	L	GF	GA	GD	Pts
Colchester United	2	1	1	0	3	2	+1	4
Peterborough	2	1	0	1	5	3	+2	3
Cambridge United	2	0	1	1	0	3	−3	1

Date	Team 1	Score	Team 2
Oct 13	Colchester United	3–2	Peterborough United
Nov 24	Cambridge United	0–0	Colchester United
Dec 01	Peterborough United	3–0	Cambridge United

Group 5
Team	Pld	W	D	L	GF	GA	GD	Pts
Torquay United	2	2	0	0	4	0	+4	6
Hereford United	2	1	0	1	2	2	0	3
Bristol Rovers	2	0	0	2	0	4	−4	0

Date	Team 1	Score	Team 2
Oct 13	Torquay United	2–0	Bristol Rovers
Oct 28	Bristol Rovers	0–2	Hereford United
Nov 25	Hereford United	0–2	Torquay United

Group 6
Team	Pld	W	D	L	GF	GA	GD	Pts
Newport County	2	2	0	0	3	0	+3	6
Port Vale	2	1	0	1	2	2	0	3
Exeter City	2	0	0	2	0	3	−3	0

Date	Team 1	Score	Team 2
Oct 13	Newport County	2–0	Port Vale
Oct 26	Port Vale	2–0	Exeter City
Nov 24	Exeter City	0–1	Newport County

Group 7
Team	Pld	W	D	L	GF	GA	GD	Pts
Brighton	2	2	0	0	9	3	+6	6
Southend United	2	1	0	1	3	3	0	3
Fulham	2	0	0	2	1	7	−6	0

Date	Team 1	Score	Team 2
Oct 13	Southend United	1–0	Fulham
Oct 27	Fulham	1–6	Brighton
Nov 25	Brighton	3–2	Southend United

Group 8
Team	Pld	W	D	L	GF	GA	GD	Pts
Wolves	2	1	1	0	4	2	+2	4
Bristol City	2	1	0	1	3	3	0	3
Swansea City	2	0	1	1	1	3	−2	1

Date	Team 1	Score	Team 2
Oct 27	Swansea City	1–1	Wolves
Nov 10	Bristol City	2–0	Swansea City
Nov 24	Wolves	3–1	Bristol City

== First round ==
=== Northern Section ===
Date	Home team	Score	Away team
19 January	Burnley	1–0	Chester City
19 January	Bury	1–0	Bolton Wanderers
19 January	Halifax Town	2–1	Chesterfield
19 January	Mansfield Town	1–0	Scunthorpe United
19 January	Preston North End	3–1	Rochdale
19 January	Sunderland	1–0	Crewe Alexandra
26 January	Darlington	3–2	Rotherham United
3 February	Carlisle United	0–2	Hartlepool United

=== Southern Section ===
Date	Home team	Score	Away team
19 January	Aldershot	1–0	Bristol City
19 January	Colchester United	1–1	Leyton Orient
Colchester United won 4–3 on penalties
19 January	Newport County	2–3	Hereford United
19 January	Torquay United	1–0	Port Vale
19 January	Walsall	1–2	Peterborough United
19 January	Wolves	4–0	Brentford
20 January	Brighton	4–2	Southend United
20 January	Notts County	2–0	Cardiff City

== Quarter-finals ==
=== Northern Section ===
Date	Home team	Score	Away team
9 February	Bury	0–1	Burnley
9 February	Sunderland	0–1	Hartlepool United
16 February	Preston North End	2–1	Mansfield Town
18 February	Darlington	1–2	Halifax Town

=== Southern Section ===
Date	Home team	Score	Away team
9 February	Colchester United	2–3	Notts County
9 February	Wolves	4–0	Peterborough United
10 February	Hereford United	0–1	Brighton
16 February	Aldershot	0–1	Torquay United

== Area semi-finals ==
=== Northern Section ===
Date	Home team	Score	Away team
8 March	Burnley	0–0	Halifax Town
Burnley won 5–3 on penalties
8 March	Hartlepool United	0–2	Preston North End

=== Southern Section ===
Date	Home team	Score	Away team
8 March	Wolves	1–0	Torquay United
9 March	Brighton	1–5	Notts County

== Area finals ==
=== Northern Area final ===
12 April 1988
19:45 BST

Burnley	0–0	Preston North End

Turf Moor, Burnley
Attendance: 15,680

19 April 1988
19:45 BST

Preston North End	1–3 (a.e.t.)	Burnley
Brazil		Oghani; Hoskin; Comstive

Deepdale, Preston
Attendance: 17,592

Burnley won 3–1 on aggregate.

=== Southern Area final ===
12 April 1988
19:30 BST

Notts County	1–1	Wolverhampton Wanderers
McParland		Bull

Meadow Lane, Nottingham
Attendance: 10,041

19 April 1988
19:30 BST

Wolverhampton Wanderers	3–0	Notts County
Bull; Downing

Molineux, Wolverhampton
Attendance: 18,413

Wolverhampton Wanderers won 4–1 on aggregate.

== Final ==
29 May 1988
15:00 BST

Burnley	0–2	Wolverhampton Wanderers
		Mutch 22'; Dennison 51'

Wembley Stadium, London
Attendance: 80,841
Referee: Roger Milford (Somerset)
