= 1981–82 Burnley F.C. season =

English football club season

Burnley
1981–82 season
- Chairman: John Jackson
- Manager: Brian Miller
- Division Three: 1st (champions)
- League Cup: 1st round
- FA Cup: 4th round
- Group Cup: Semi-final
- Top goalscorer: League: Billy Hamilton (11); All: Billy Hamilton (19)
- Highest home attendance: 18,711 v Chesterfield (18 May 1982)
- Lowest home attendance: 2,305 v Carlisle United (15 August 1981)
- Average home league attendance: 6,936

The 1981–82 season was Burnley's second consecutive season in the third tier of English football. They were managed by Brian Miller in his second season in charge of the club.

== Appearances and goals ==
No.	Pos	Nat	Player	Total		Division Three		League Cup		FA Cup		Group Cup	
No.	Pos	Nat	Player	Apps	Goals	Apps	Goals	Apps	Goals	Apps	Goals	Apps	Goals
	FW	(England) ENG	Mark Allen	3	1	0+2	1	0+0	0	0+0	0	0+1	0
	DF	(England) ENG	Colin Anderson	6	0	2+2	0	0+0	0	0+0	0	2+0	0
	MF	(Northern Ireland) NIR	Tommy Cassidy	38	4	27+0	3	2+0	1	6+0	0	3+0	0
	MF	(England) ENG	Phil Cavener	16	0	6+3	0	1+1	0	0+0	0	5+0	0
	DF	(Northern Ireland) NIR	Paul Dixon	15	0	8+1	0	0+0	0	4+0	0	2+0	0
	MF	(England) ENG	Martin Dobson	54	3	44+0	3	2+0	0	5+0	0	3+0	0
	MF	(Wales) WAL	Brian Flynn	2	0	2+0	0	0+0	0	0+0	0	0+0	0
	FW	(Northern Ireland) NIR	Billy Hamilton	55	19	44+0	11	2+0	1	6+0	4	3+0	3
	DF	(England) ENG	David Holt	37	3	30+0	0	2+0	2	0+0	0	5+0	1
	DF	(England) ENG	Brian Laws	55	6	44+0	6	2+0	0	6+0	0	3+0	0
	FW	(Republic of Ireland) IRL	Paul McGee	21	9	19+0	7	0+0	0	2+0	2	0+0	0
	DF	(England) ENG	Dave Miller	1	0	0+0	0	0+0	0	0+0	0	1+0	0
	GK	(England) ENG	Billy O'Rourke	1	0	0+0	0	0+0	0	0+0	0	1+0	0
	DF	(England) ENG	Vince Overson	46	4	36+0	4	1+0	0	6+0	0	2+1	0
	MF	(England) ENG	Mike Phelan	29	1	22+1	1	1+0	0	2+0	0	3+0	0
	MF	(England) ENG	Eric Potts	29	2	14+7	1	2+0	1	1+1	0	4+0	0
	DF	(England) ENG	Phil Ray	1	0	0+0	0	0+0	0	0+0	0	1+0	0
	MF	(Scotland) SCO	Stuart Robertson	7	0	5+1	0	1+0	0	0+0	0	0+0	0
	DF	(England) ENG	Derek Scott	36	3	29+1	2	1+0	0	0+0	0	5+0	1
	MF	(England) ENG	Trevor Steven	43	5	36+0	3	1+0	0	6+0	2	0+0	0
	GK	(England) ENG	Alan Stevenson	58	0	46+0	0	2+0	0	6+0	0	4+0	0
	FW	(England) ENG	Steve Taylor	31	14	21+1	9	1+0	0	4+0	3	4+0	2
	DF	(England) ENG	Andy Wharton	40	5	34+0	5	0+0	0	6+0	0	0+0	0
	FW	(New Zealand) NZL	Billy Wright	1	0	0+0	0	0+0	0	0+0	0	1+0	0
	MF	(England) ENG	Kevin Young	49	7	37+2	7	1+0	0	6+0	0	3+0	0

== Matches ==
=== Football League Division Three ===
Key

- In Result column, Burnley's score shown first
- H = Home match
- A = Away match
- pen. = Penalty kick
- o.g. = Own goal

Results

Date	Opponents	Result	Goalscorers	Attendance
29 August 1981	Gillingham (A)	1–3	Taylor 61'	4,663
5 September 1981	Plymouth Argyle (H)	1–0	Dobson 78' (pen.)	3,476
12 September 1981	Bristol Rovers (A)	1–2	Kite 69' (o.g.)	5,083
19 September 1981	Huddersfield Town (H)	0–0		6,524
22 September 1981	Doncaster Rovers (H)	0–1		3,799
26 September 1981	Millwall (A)	3–4	Laws 23', Potts 42', Overson 44'	4,796
29 September 1981	Carlisle United (A)	0–1		3,983
3 October 1981	Swindon Town (H)	0–2		3,377
10 October 1981	Portsmouth (A)	2–1	Young 12', Wharton 61'	9,891
17 October 1981	Exeter City (H)	3–3	Taylor 10', Overson 49', Laws 62' (pen.)	3,982
20 October 1981	Preston North End (A)	1–1	Wharton 61'	7,521
24 October 1981	Fulham (H)	2–2	Hamilton 7', Taylor 18'	4,124
31 October 1981	Brentford (A)	0–0		6,929
3 November 1981	Chester (H)	1–0	Cassidy 74'	3,484
7 November 1981	Wimbledon (H)	2–2	Hamilton 27', Overson 82'	4,242
14 November 1981	Reading (A)	1–1	Steven 62'	4,337
28 November 1981	Bristol City (A)	3–2	Young 3', McGee (2) 77', 89'	5,255
5 December 1981	Oxford United (H)	2–1	Cassidy 58', Hamilton 84'	4,380
9 January 1982	Plymouth Argyle (A)	1–1	Young 47'	5,065
16 January 1982	Newport County (H)	2–1	Taylor 52', Overson 57'	4,730
30 January 1982	Huddersfield Town (A)	2–1	Taylor (2) 46', 63'	10,269
2 February 1982	Gillingham (H)	1–0	Wharton 60'	5,848
6 February 1982	Bristol Rovers (H)	4–0	Hamilton 5', Mabbutt 32' (o.g.), Scott 56', Taylor 84'	5,784
9 February 1982	Doncaster Rovers (A)	1–0	Wharton 71'	5,638
13 February 1982	Swindon Town (A)	2–1	Taylor 15', Cassidy 43'	5,296
20 February 1982	Millwall (H)	1–1	Hamilton 40'	7,081
27 February 1982	Portsmouth (H)	3–0	Taylor 10', Phelan 57', Scott 67'	7,013
2 March 1982	Walsall (A)	1–1	Hamilton 70'	4,196
6 March 1982	Exeter City (A)	1–2	Allen 88'	3,136
13 March 1982	Fulham (A)	1–1	Young 43'	7,214
17 March 1982	Chester (A)	1–0	Laws 28' (pen.)	3,509
20 March 1982	Brentford (H)	0–0		7,906
27 March 1982	Wimbledon (A)	0–0		2,641
31 March 1982	Lincoln City (A)	1–1	Steven 88'	6,188
3 April 1982	Reading (H)	3–0	Hamilton (2) 3', 13', Young 89'	6,661
10 April 1982	Lincoln City (H)	1–0	Hamilton 70'	10,911
12 April 1982	Chesterfield (A)	2–1	Laws 27', Dobson 39'	7,732
17 April 1982	Oxford United (A)	0–0		10,407
20 April 1982	Southend United (H)	3–5	McGee 30', Steven 41', Otulakowksi 71' (o.g.)	8,171
24 April 1982	Bristol City (H)	2–0	Laws 59', Dobson 80'	7,063
1 May 1982	Newport County (A)	0–0		4,094
4 May 1982	Carlisle United (H)	1–0	McGee 71'	9,760
8 May 1982	Walsall (H)	2–1	McGee 1', Young 50'	8,537
11 May 1982	Preston North End (H)	2–0	Hamilton (2) 52', 84'	13,911
14 May 1982	Southend United (A)	4–1	Wharton 32', McGee (2) 40', 83', Laws 88'	5,123
18 May 1982	Chesterfield (H)	1–1	Young 48'	18,711

=== Final league position ===
Pos	Team	Pld	W	D	L	GF	GA	GD	Pts	Promotion or relegation
1	Burnley (C, P)	46	21	17	8	66	45	+21	80	Promotion to the Second Division
2	Carlisle United (P)	46	23	11	12	65	50	+15	80	Promotion to the Second Division
3	Fulham (P)	46	21	15	10	77	51	+26	78	Promotion to the Second Division
4	Lincoln City	46	21	14	11	66	40	+26	77	
5	Oxford United	46	19	14	13	63	49	+14	71	

Source: rsssf.com (incorrect), source=11v11.com
(C) Champions; (P) Promoted

=== FA Cup ===
Date	Round	Opponents	Result	Goalscorers	Attendance
21 November 1981	Round 1	Runcorn (H)	0–0		6,112
24 November 1981	Replay	Runcorn (A)	2–1	McGee (2) 12', 78'	5,500
2 January 1982	Round 2	Bury (A)	1–1	Taylor 46'	9,200
4 January 1982	Replay	Bury (H)	2–1 (a.e.t.)	Hamilton 43', Steven 101'	9,108
18 January 1982	Round 3	Altrincham (H)	6–1	Taylor (2) 23', 67', Steven 47', Hamilton (3) 60', 70', 78'	10,174
23 January 1982	Round 4	Shrewsbury Town (A)	0–1		7,679

=== League Cup ===
Date	Round	Opponents	Result	Goalscorers	Attendance
1 September 1981	Round 1 First leg	Tranmere Rovers (A)	2–4	Potts 58', Hamilton 72'	2,034
15 September 1981	Round 1 Second leg	Tranmere Rovers (H)	3–3	Holt (2) 19', 22', Cassidy 89'	2,363

=== Football League Group Cup ===
Date	Round	Opponents	Result	Goalscorers	Attendance
15 August 1981	Group Stage	Carlisle United (H)	4–2	Hamilton (2) 2', 29', Taylor (2) 28', 40'	2,305
18 August 1981	Group Stage	Preston North End (A)	1–0	Hamilton 14'	5,269
22 August 1981	Group Stage	Blackpool (A)	0–0		3,464
8 December 1981	Quarter Final	Watford (H)	2–1	Scott 18', Holt 23'	2,658
16 February 1982	Semi Final	Wimbledon (A)	0–5		1,267
