= List of Burnley F.C. seasons =

Graph showing Burnley's league performance from the inaugural season of the Football League in 1888–89 to the present

Burnley Football Club, an English association football club based in Burnley, Lancashire, was founded on 18 May 1882 as Burnley Rovers. (Note: The Burnley Advertiser reported on 26 September 1874 that a rugby football team named "The Burnley Rovers Football Club" had "just been formed", already having 35 members. On 18 May 1882, Burnley Rovers voted for a shift to association football.) The suffix "Rovers" was soon dropped, and the club was simply known as "Burnley Football Club" at the time of its first recorded match on 10 August 1882. For the first six years of its existence, there was no league football, so matches were arranged on an ad hoc basis, supplemented by cup competitions organised at local and national level. The club won its first trophy in 1883: the Dr Dean's Cup, a knockout competition between amateur clubs in the local area. Burnley turned professional at the end of 1883, first entered the FA Cup in the 1885–86 season, and were one of the 12 founding members of the Football League in 1888. The team have played in the top four tiers of English football from 1888 to the present day.

Burnley have been champions of England twice, in 1920–21 and 1959–60, have won the FA Cup once, in 1913–14, and have won the FA Charity Shield twice, in 1960 and 1973. They were the second, and are one of only five teams to have won all four professional divisions of English football, along with Wolverhampton Wanderers, Preston North End, Sheffield United and Portsmouth. Burnley have been runners-up in the First Division twice, in 1919–20 and 1961–62, and FA Cup runners-up twice, in 1946–47 and 1961–62. They are yet to win the League Cup, having reached the semi-finals on four occasions, most recently in 2008–09.

As of the end of the 2025–26 season, the team have spent 61 seasons in the top division of English football, 48 in the second, 11 in the third, and 7 in the fourth. Burnley have changed division on 27 occasions—13 promotions (6 as champions) and 14 relegations. Jimmy Robson and Willie Irvine hold the record for most goals scored in a season with 37, which they achieved in 1960–61 and 1965–66 respectively. Burnley's highest average home attendance is 33,621, which the club set in 1947–48.

The table details their achievements in domestic and international competitions, and records their top goalscorer and average home league attendance, for each completed season.

== Key ==
Key to league record:

- Pld – Matches played
- W – Matches won
- D – Matches drawn
- L – Matches lost
- GF – Goals for
- GA – Goals against
- Pts – Points
- Pos – Final position

Key to colours and symbols:

1st or W	Winners
2nd or F	Runners-up
↑	Promoted
↓	Relegated
♦	Top league scorer in Burnley's division

Key to divisions:

- FL – Football League
- Div 1 – Football League First Division
- Div 2 – Football League Second Division
- Div 3 – Football League Third Division
- Div 4 – Football League Fourth Division
- Prem – Premier League
- Champ – EFL Championship

Key to rounds:

- DNE – Did not enter
- QR4 – Fourth qualifying round
- IntR – Intermediate round (between qualifying rounds and rounds proper)
- PO – Play-off round
- Group – Group stage
- Group(N) – Group stage Northern section
- R1 – First round, etc.
- R1(N) – First round Northern section, etc.
- QF – Quarter-final
- QF(N) – Quarter-final Northern section
- SF – Semi-final
- SF(N) – Semi-final Northern section
- P3rd – Third place
- F – Finalists
- F(N) – Finalists Northern section
- W – Winners

Details of the abandoned 1939–40 Football League are shown in italics and appropriately footnoted.

== Seasons ==
List of seasons, including league division and statistics, cup results, top scorer and average league attendance
Season	League									FA Cup (Note: Beginning with the 1925–26 season, the FA Cup was structured so that the third round proper contained 64 teams. Before that date, the structure had varied, so rounds are not directly comparable to the round of the same name after 1925. For example, in 1888–89, Burnley's first season in the Football League, there were only three rounds proper before the semi-final, as compared with the current six.)	League Cup (Note: The League Cup competition started in the 1960–61 season.)	Other		Top scorer(s) (Note: Includes goals scored in the Football League, including test matches and play-offs, Premier League, FA Cup, League Cup, Charity Shield, European Cup, Inter-Cities Fairs Cup, UEFA Europa League, Texaco Cup, Watney Cup, Anglo-Scottish Cup, Football League Group Cup, and Associate Members' Cup / Football League Trophy. Goals scored in seasons from 1888–89 to 2006–07 sourced to Simpson (2007), and from 2007–08 onwards sourced to Soccerbase.)		Avg. (Note: League matches only (including Football League and Premier League, but excluding test matches and play-offs). Sourced from Simpson (2007), The Clarets Chronicles up to and including the 2006–07 season, and from European Football Statistics and ESPN thereafter.) attend.
Season	Division (Note: Divisions are sorted according to their level within the English football league system at the time.)	Pld	W	D	L	GF	GA	Pts	Pos	FA Cup	League Cup	Competition	Result	Player(s)	Goals	Avg. attend.
1882–85	Burnley played only friendly matches or in local cup competitions.															
1885–86	—	—	—	—	—	—	—	—	—	R1 (Note: Burnley's first appearance in the FA Cup. They fielded their reserve side, as most professionals were prohibited entry due to rules of the Football Association (FA) that year. Rules stated that professionals could only play in the FA Cup and County FA competitions if they had been born, or had resided for a minimum of two years, within six miles of their club's ground. The reserve side lost 11–0 to Darwen Old Wanderers, a club record defeat.)	—	—	—	n/a	—	—
1886–87	—	—	—	—	—	—	—	—	—	R1 (Note: For unclear reasons, both Burnley and opponents Astley Bridge withdrew from the competition after the first replay.)	—	—	—	Walter Place (Note: The first of Place's two goals in the FA Cup first round tie against Astley Bridge, a 3–3 draw on 23 October 1886, was the club's first goal in national competitive football.)	2	—
1887–88	—	—	—	—	—	—	—	—	—	R2	—	—	—	Bill McFettridge	2	—
1888–89	FL (Note: Burnley was one of 12 founding member clubs of the Football League in 1888; the world's first league football competition.)	22	7	3	12	42	62	17	9th (Note: There was no automatic relegation from the Football League until 1987. The bottom four clubs in the League, together with candidates from outside the League, applied for re-election. Each current League club had a vote. Burnley were re-elected.)	R2	—	—	—	Pat Gallocher	9	4,200
1889–90	FL	22	4	5	13	36	65	13	11th (Note: There was no automatic relegation from the Football League until 1987. The bottom three clubs in the League, together with candidates from outside the League, applied for re-election. Each current League club had a vote. Burnley were re-elected.)	R1	—	—	—	Robert Haresnape	6	5,400
1890–91	FL	22	9	3	10	52	63	21	8th	R2	—	—	—	Claude Lambie	17	7,580
1891–92	FL	26	11	4	11	49	45	26	7th	R2	—	—	—	Tom Nicol	18	6,125
1892–93	Div 1 (Note: The Football League expanded its membership at the end of this season by forming a Second Division.)	30	13	4	13	51	44	30	6th	R2	—	—	—	Billy Bowes; Robert Buchanan	8	6,805
1893–94	Div 1	30	15	4	11	61	51	34	5th	R1	—	—	—	Peter Turnbull	15	6,300
1894–95	Div 1	30	11	4	15	44	56	26	9th	R1	—	—	—	Tom Nicol	11	6,235
1895–96	Div 1	30	10	7	13	48	44	27	10th	R2	—	—	—	Hugh Robertson	12	5,875
1896–97	Div 1 ↓	30	6	7	17	43	61	19	16th (Note: For finishing in 16th place, Burnley had to play test matches against Newton Heath and Notts County from the Second Division in order to stay up. They only gained three points from four matches and were relegated to Division Two.)	R1	—	—	—	Billy Bowes	12	5,250
1897–98	Div 2 ↑	30	20	8	2	80	24	48	1st (Note: Although Burnley finished first in the league, the club had to play test matches against the two bottom clubs from Division One. The final test match left Burnley and Stoke involved needing a draw to both win promotion; the game finished 0–0. The Football League decided to expand each division by two places, and from then on the League adopted promotion and relegation directly dependent on league position (two up, two down).)	QF	—	—	—	Jimmy Ross	25	4,125
1898–99	Div 1	34	15	9	10	45	47	39	3rd	R1	—	—	—	Wilf Toman	12	6,355
1899–1900	Div 1 ↓	34	11	5	18	34	54	27	17th	R1	—	—	—	Edgar Chadwick	10	5,880
1900–01	Div 2	34	20	4	10	53	29	44	3rd	R2	—	—	—	Bill Jenkinson	11	3,275
1901–02	Div 2	34	10	10	14	41	45	30	9th	R1	—	—	—	Cornelius Hogan	12	2,225
1902–03	Div 2	34	6	8	20	30	77	20	18th	IntR	—	—	—	Cornelius Hogan	7	1,500
1903–04	Div 2	34	15	9	10	50	55	39	5th	QR4	—	—	—	William Jackson	10	4,100
1904–05	Div 2	34	12	6	16	43	52	30	11th	IntR	—	—	—	Doug MacFarlane	13	4,260
1905–06	Div 2	38	15	8	15	42	53	38	9th	R1	—	—	—	Doug MacFarlane	10	4,975
1906–07	Div 2	38	17	6	15	62	47	40	7th	R1	—	—	—	Dick Smith	16	5,275
1907–08	Div 2	38	20	6	12	67	50	46	7th	R1	—	—	—	Dick Smith	24	7,725
1908–09	Div 2	38	13	7	18	51	58	33	14th	QF (Note: Burnley reached the quarter-finals, in which they were eliminated by Manchester United in a replay. Burnley had led 1–0 in the original match on a snowy Turf Moor pitch (the club's home ground), when the game was abandoned after 72 minutes.)	—	—	—	Dick Smith	18	6,815
1909–10	Div 2	38	14	6	18	62	61	34	14th	R2	—	—	—	Benny Green	19	6,555
1910–11	Div 2	38	13	15	10	45	45	41	8th	QF	—	—	—	Benny Green	14	7,700
1911–12	Div 2	38	22	8	8	77	41	52	3rd	R1	—	—	—	Bert Freeman (Note: Freeman scored 32 goals in Division Two.)	33 ♦	14,000
1912–13	Div 2 ↑	38	21	8	9	88	53	50	2nd	SF	—	—	—	Bert Freeman (Note: Freeman scored 31 goals in Division Two.) (Note: Excluding two goals in the FA Cup first round against Leeds City, which was abandoned after 50 minutes due to snow. The match was later replayed in full and Freeman scored once.)	36 ♦	12,970
1913–14	Div 1	38	12	12	14	61	53	36	12th	W (Note: Beat Liverpool 1–0 to win club's first major trophy)	—	—	—	Bert Freeman	19	21,820
1914–15	Div 1	38	18	7	13	61	47	43	4th	R3	—	—	—	Teddy Hodgson	20	11,415
1915–19	The Football League and FA Cup were suspended until after the First World War. (Note: The club played 144 games in regional league and cup football between 1915 and 1919. Guest players were permitted, and results and records from this period are not included in official statistics.)															
1919–20	Div 1	42	21	9	12	65	59	51	2nd	R2	—	—	—	Bert Freeman	12	19,530
1920–21	Div 1	42	23	13	6	79	36	59	1st	R3	—	Charity Shield	F	Joe Anderson	31	31,535
1921–22	Div 1	42	22	5	15	72	54	49	3rd	R1	—	—	—	Joe Anderson	21	23,640
1922–23	Div 1	42	16	6	20	58	59	38	15th	R1	—	—	—	Bob Kelly	17	16,885
1923–24	Div 1	42	12	12	18	55	60	36	17th	SF	—	—	—	George Beel	21	14,890
1924–25	Div 1	42	11	12	19	46	75	34	19th	R1	—	—	—	Tommy Roberts	16	15,890
1925–26	Div 1	42	13	10	19	85	108	36	20th	R3	—	—	—	Louis Page	26	17,857
1926–27	Div 1	42	19	9	14	91	80	47	5th	R5	—	—	—	George Beel	27	19,422
1927–28	Div 1	42	16	7	19	82	98	39	19th	R3	—	—	—	George Beel (Note: Beel's 35 goals in the league is a club record.)	35	17,408
1928–29	Div 1	42	15	8	19	81	103	38	19th	R4	—	—	—	George Beel	32	17,239
1929–30	Div 1 ↓	42	14	8	20	79	97	36	21st	R3	—	—	—	Louis Page	15	14,726
1930–31	Div 2	42	17	11	14	81	77	45	8th	R4	—	—	—	George Beel	25	11,493
1931–32	Div 2	42	13	9	20	59	87	35	19th	R3	—	—	—	George Beel	12	8,410
1932–33	Div 2	42	11	14	17	67	79	36	19th	QF	—	—	—	Tommy Jones; Cecil Smith	16	9,401
1933–34	Div 2	42	18	6	18	60	72	42	13th	R3	—	—	—	Cecil Smith	18	11,403
1934–35	Div 2	42	16	9	17	63	73	41	12th	SF	—	—	—	George Brown	24	10,825
1935–36	Div 2	42	12	13	17	50	59	37	15th	R3	—	—	—	Cecil Smith	10	10,402
1936–37	Div 2	42	16	10	16	57	61	42	13th	R5	—	—	—	Charlie Fletcher	13	12,041
1937–38	Div 2	42	17	10	15	54	54	44	6th	R4	—	—	—	Bob Brocklebank	16	13,394
1938–39	Div 2	42	15	9	18	50	56	39	14th	R3	—	—	—	Gordon Clayton	10	13,731
1939–40	Div 2	2	0	1	1	1	3	1	(Note: When the Second World War began in 1939, the 1939–40 Football League season was abandoned with two matches played.)	—	—	—	—	Ron Hornby	1	—
1939–45	The Football League and FA Cup were suspended until after the Second World War. (Note: The club played 215 games in regional league and cup football between 1939 and 1946. Guest players were permitted, and results and records from this period are not included in official statistics.)															
1945–46	— (Note: This was the only full season played in the wartime Football League North and South regionalised competitions. These leagues included Football League First and Second Division clubs divided geographically, playing each other home and away. Burnley finished in 16th place (of 22 clubs) in the Northern section.)	—	—	—	—	—	—	—	—	R3 (Note: From the first round proper to the sixth round of the 1945–46 FA Cup, matches were played over two legs.)	—	—	—	Harry Jackson; Peter Kippax; Billy Morris (Note: FA Cup goals only)	1	—
1946–47	Div 2 ↑	42	22	14	6	65	29	58	2nd	F (Note: Lost 1–0 to Charlton Athletic after extra time)	—	—	—	Harry Potts	17	25,856
1947–48	Div 1	42	20	12	10	56	43	52	3rd	R3	—	—	—	Harry Potts	14	33,621
1948–49	Div 1	42	12	14	16	43	50	38	15th	R5	—	—	—	Jackie Chew	11	30,290
1949–50	Div 1	42	16	13	13	40	40	45	10th	R5	—	—	—	Harry Potts	12	27,631
1950–51	Div 1	42	14	14	14	48	43	42	10th	R3	—	—	—	Bill Holden	12	28,296
1951–52	Div 1	42	15	10	17	56	63	40	14th	QF	—	—	—	Billy Morris	19	26,624
1952–53	Div 1	42	18	12	12	67	52	48	6th	R5	—	—	—	Bill Holden	22	28,480
1953–54	Div 1	42	21	4	17	78	67	46	7th	R4	—	—	—	Billy Gray	20	28,151
1954–55	Div 1	42	17	9	16	51	48	43	10th	R3	—	—	—	Bill Holden	14	25,094
1955–56	Div 1	42	18	8	16	64	54	44	7th	R4	—	—	—	Peter McKay (Note: Excluding two goals in the FA Cup third round against Bury, which was abandoned after 65 minutes due to fog. The match was later replayed in full, but McKay did not score again.)	27	23,397
1956–57	Div 1	42	18	10	14	56	50	46	7th	QF	—	—	—	Jimmy McIlroy	16	22,493
1957–58	Div 1	42	21	5	16	80	74	47	6th	R4	—	—	—	Jimmy McIlroy	19	22,251
1958–59	Div 1	42	19	10	13	81	70	48	7th	QF	—	—	—	Ray Pointer	29	23,733
1959–60	Div 1	42	24	7	11	85	61	55	1st	QF	—	—	—	John Connelly	24	26,978
1960–61	Div 1	42	22	7	13	102	77	51	4th	SF	SF (Note: Lost 2–1 to Aston Villa in a replay, after the score was 3–3 on aggregate)	Charity Shield European Cup	W (Note: Until 1993, in the event of a draw, the Charity Shield would be shared between the two competing teams, with each team having possession of the trophy for six months. Burnley and Wolverhampton Wanderers drew 2–2.) QF	Jimmy Robson (Note: Robson's 37 goals in all competitions is a club record.)	37	23,827
1961–62	Div 1	42	21	11	10	101	67	53	2nd	F	DNE (Note: Burnley chose to not participate in the competition again until 1965–66, as they had other priorities.)	—	—	Ray Pointer	26	27,125
1962–63	Div 1	42	22	10	10	78	57	54	3rd	R4	DNE	— (Note: Burnley had sought to enter the 1962–63 Inter-Cities Fairs Cup after finishing second in the 1961–62 First Division, but their application was rejected by the Fairs Cup committee as Burnley was neither a city nor the host of a trade fair. From 1964 onwards, qualification was determined by league position.)	—	Andy Lochhead	20	25,180
1963–64	Div 1	42	17	10	15	71	64	44	9th	QF	DNE	—	—	Andy Lochhead	14	19,755
1964–65	Div 1	42	16	10	16	70	70	42	12th	R5	DNE	—	—	Willie Irvine	25	15,739
1965–66	Div 1	42	24	7	11	79	47	55	3rd	R4	QF	—	—	Willie Irvine (Note: Irvine scored 29 goals in Division One.) (Note: Irvine's 37 goals in all competitions is a club record.)	37 ♦	19,968
1966–67	Div 1	42	15	9	18	66	76	39	14th	R3	R3	Inter-Cities Fairs Cup	QF	Andy Lochhead	24	20,508
1967–68	Div 1	42	14	10	18	64	71	38	14th	R3	QF	—	—	Frank Casper	17	17,435
1968–69	Div 1	42	15	9	18	55	82	39	14th	R4	SF (Note: Lost 3–2 to Swindon Town in a replay after extra time)	—	—	Frank Casper (Note: Excluding one league goal against Sunderland; the match was abandoned at half-time due to snow. The game was later replayed in full, but Casper did not score again.)	21	16,073
1969–70	Div 1	42	12	15	15	56	61	39	14th	R4	R4	—	—	Steve Kindon	18	16,452
1970–71	Div 1 ↓	42	7	13	22	29	63	27	21st	R3	R2	Texaco Cup	R1	Frank Casper; Eric Probert	5	16,156
1971–72	Div 2	42	20	6	16	70	55	46	7th	R3	R3	—	—	Frank Casper	19	12,893
1972–73	Div 2 ↑	42	24	14	4	72	35	62	1st	R3	R2	Watney Cup	SF	Paul Fletcher	15	14,083
1973–74	Div 1	42	16	14	12	56	53	46	6th	P3rd (Note: Between 1969–70 and 1973–74, the losing FA Cup semi-finalists took part in a third-place play-off. Burnley defeated Leicester City 1–0 at Filbert Street, Leicester.)	R3	Charity Shield Texaco Cup	W (Note: The 1972–73 First Division champions Liverpool and the 1972–73 FA Cup winners Sunderland declined to compete in the 1973 FA Charity Shield, so Manchester City—the reigning holders of the Shield—and Second Division champions Burnley played instead. Burnley defeated City 1–0.) F (Note: Lost 2–1 to Newcastle United after extra time)	Paul Fletcher	21	20,670
1974–75	Div 1	42	17	11	14	68	67	45	10th	R3	R4	—	—	Leighton James	17	19,641
1975–76	Div 1 ↓	42	9	10	23	43	66	28	21st	R3	QF	—	—	Peter Noble	17	18,120
1976–77	Div 2	42	11	14	17	46	64	36	16th	R4	R2	Anglo-Scottish Cup	Group	Peter Noble	15	12,173
1977–78	Div 2	42	15	10	17	56	64	40	11th	R4	R3	Anglo-Scottish Cup	Group	Steve Kindon	13	11,581
1978–79	Div 2	42	14	12	16	51	62	40	13th	R5	R3	Anglo-Scottish Cup	W	Peter Noble	16	10,748
1979–80	Div 2 ↓ (Note: Relegated to the third tier of English football for the first time)	42	6	15	21	39	73	27	21st	R4	R2	Anglo-Scottish Cup	Group	Martin Dobson; Billy Hamilton	7	8,118
1980–81	Div 3	46	18	14	14	60	48	50	8th	R2	R2	Anglo-Scottish Cup	Group	Steve Taylor	17	6,469
1981–82	Div 3 ↑ (Note: This season saw the introduction of three points for a win instead of two.)	46	21	17	8	66	45	80	1st	R4	R1	Football League Group Cup	SF	Billy Hamilton	19	6,936
1982–83	Div 2 ↓	42	12	8	22	56	66	44	21st	QF	SF	—	—	Billy Hamilton	19	9,085
1983–84	Div 3	46	16	14	16	76	61	62	12th	R3	R1	Associate Members' Cup	SF(N)	Billy Hamilton	21	6,625
1984–85	Div 3 ↓ (Note: Relegated to the fourth tier of English football for the first time)	46	11	13	22	60	73	46	21st	R3	R2	Associate Members' Cup	QF(N)	Kevin Hird	22	4,177
1985–86	Div 4	46	16	11	19	60	65	59	14th	R3	R1	Associate Members' Cup	Group(N)	Alan Taylor	21	3,204
1986–87	Div 4	46	12	13	21	53	74	49	22nd (Note: Club's lowest league finish)	R1	R1	Associate Members' Cup	R1(N)	Leighton James	12	3,342
1987–88	Div 4	46	20	7	19	57	62	67	10th	R1	R2	Associate Members' Cup	F (Note: Wolverhampton Wanderers defeated Burnley 2–0. The match was attended by 80,841 people, a record for a tie between two teams from English football's fourth tier.)	George Oghani	19	6,282
1988–89	Div 4	46	14	13	19	52	61	55	16th	R1	R2	Associate Members' Cup	R1(N)	Brendan O'Connell	18	7,062 (Note: Burnley had the highest average attendance in the division)
1989–90	Div 4	46	14	14	18	45	55	56	16th	R3	R1	Associate Members' Cup	Group(N)	Ron Futcher	10	6,222
1990–91	Div 4	46	23	10	13	70	51	79	6th (Note: Lost in the play-off semi-final to Torquay United on aggregate)	R3	R2	Associate Members' Cup	SF(N)	Ron Futcher	20	7,882
1991–92	Div 4 ↑	42	25	8	9	79	43	83	1st (Note: By winning Division Four, Burnley became only the second club, after Wolverhampton Wanderers, to win all four professional divisions.)	R3	R1	Associate Members' Cup	F(N)	Mike Conroy (Note: Excluding one league goal against Aldershot, who folded during the season and were obliged to resign from the Football League–their record was expunged.)	28	10,519
1992–93	Div 2 (Note: Division Three was renamed Division Two after the FA Premiership broke away from the Football League.)	46	15	16	15	57	59	61	13th	R3	R1	Football League Trophy (Note: The Associate Members' Cup was renamed the Football League Trophy from the 1992–93 season.)	QF(N)	Adrian Heath	23	10,537
1993–94	Div 2 ↑	46	21	10	15	79	58	73	6th (Note: Promoted to Division One via the play-offs, beating Plymouth Argyle 3–1 on aggregate in the semi-final and Stockport County 2–1 in the final, after Stockport had two players sent off.)	R3	R2	Football League Trophy	Group(N)	David Eyres	28	11,317
1994–95	Div 1 ↓	46	11	13	22	49	74	46	22nd	R4	R2	—	—	David Eyres; Liam Robinson	10	12,063
1995–96	Div 2	46	14	13	19	56	68	55	17th	R1	R2	Football League Trophy	QF(N)	Kurt Nogan	26	9,064
1996–97	Div 2	46	19	11	16	71	55	68	9th	R3	R2	Football League Trophy	R2(N)	Paul Barnes	25	10,053
1997–98	Div 2	46	13	13	20	55	65	52	20th	R1	R2	Football League Trophy	F(N)	Andy Cooke	20	10,481
1998–99	Div 2	46	13	16	17	54	73	55	15th	R1	R1	Football League Trophy	R1(N)	Andy Payton	23	10,604
1999–2000	Div 2 ↑	46	25	13	8	69	47	88	2nd	R4	R1	Football League Trophy	R1(N)	Andy Payton (Note: Payton scored 27 goals in Division Two.)	27 ♦	12,937
2000–01	Div 1	46	21	9	16	50	54	72	7th	R3	R2	—	—	Andy Payton	15	16,234
2001–02	Div 1	46	21	12	13	70	62	75	7th	R4	R1	—	—	Gareth Taylor	16	15,948
2002–03	Div 1	46	15	10	21	65	89	55	16th	QF	R4	—	—	Gareth Taylor	17	13,977
2003–04	Div 1	46	13	14	19	60	77	53	19th	R5	R3	—	—	Robbie Blake	22	12,541
2004–05	Champ (Note: Division One was renamed the Championship from the 2004–05 season.)	46	15	15	16	38	39	60	13th	R5	R4	—	—	Robbie Blake	13	12,640
2005–06	Champ	46	14	12	20	46	54	54	17th	R3	R3	—	—	Ade Akinbiyi	14	12,462
2006–07	Champ	46	15	12	19	52	49	57	15th	R3	R1	—	—	Andy Gray	14	11,956
2007–08	Champ	46	16	14	16	60	67	62	13th	R3	R3	—	—	Andy Gray	13	12,365
2008–09	Champ ↑	46	21	13	12	72	60	76	5th (Note: Promoted to the Premier League via the play-offs, beating Reading 3–0 on aggregate in the semi-final and Sheffield United 1–0 in the final)	R5	SF (Note: The club played Tottenham Hotspur in the semi-finals, and the score was 4–4 on aggregate. Burnley would have progressed to the final on away goals (1–4 away, 3–0 at home) but according to League Cup rules at the time, away goals only came into play after extra time. Burnley were eliminated after two Tottenham goals in the last two minutes of extra time. The League Cup abolished the extra time and away goals rules from the 2018–19 edition.)	—	—	Martin Paterson	19	13,082
2009–10	Prem ↓	38	8	6	24	42	82	30	18th	R4	R3	—	—	Steven Fletcher	12	20,654
2010–11	Champ	46	18	14	14	65	61	68	8th	R5	R4	—	—	Chris Eagles; Jay Rodriguez	15	14,931
2011–12	Champ	46	17	11	18	62	61	58	13th	R3	R4	—	—	Jay Rodriguez	21	14,048
2012–13	Champ	46	16	13	17	62	60	61	11th	R3	R3	—	—	Charlie Austin	28	12,928
2013–14	Champ ↑	46	26	15	5	72	37	93	2nd	R3	R4	—	—	Danny Ings	26	13,719
2014–15	Prem ↓	38	7	12	19	28	53	33	19th	R3	R2	—	—	Danny Ings	11	19,131
2015–16	Champ ↑	46	26	15	5	72	35	93	1st	R4	R1	—	—	Andre Gray (Note: Gray moved from Brentford to Burnley early in the season. In the Championship, he had scored two goals for Brentford and 23 for Burnley, taking his tally to 25.)	23 ♦	16,823
2016–17	Prem	38	11	7	20	39	55	40	16th	R5	R2	—	—	Sam Vokes	12	20,558
2017–18	Prem	38	14	12	12	36	39	54	7th	R3	R3	—	—	Chris Wood	11	20,688
2018–19	Prem	38	11	7	20	45	68	40	15th	R4	R3	UEFA Europa League	PO (Note: The club appeared in a major European competition for the first time in 51 years, courtesy of a 7th place finish in the 2017–18 season. Burnley beat Aberdeen of Scotland and İstanbul Başakşehir of Turkey in the second qualifying round and third qualifying round, respectively. Greek club Olympiacos were the opponents in the play-off round, but Burnley were eliminated 4–2 on aggregate.)	Ashley Barnes; Chris Wood	13	20,534
2019–20	Prem	38	15	9	14	43	50	54	10th	R4	R2	—	—	Chris Wood	14	20,260 (Note: The 2019–20 season was interrupted for three months because of the COVID-19 pandemic before being completed behind closed doors; the average attendance only covers those matches played with spectators present.)
2020–21	Prem	38	10	9	19	33	55	39	17th	R5	R4	—	—	Chris Wood	12	3,387 (Note: Because of COVID restrictions, Burnley played 18 of their 19 home matches behind closed doors. At the home game against Liverpool on 19 May 2021, there was a limit of 3,500 fans allowed to attend.)
2021–22	Prem ↓	38	7	14	17	34	53	35	18th	R3	R4	—	—	Maxwel Cornet	9	19,399
2022–23	Champ ↑	46	29	14	3	87	35	101	1st	QF	R4	—	—	Nathan Tella	19	19,953
2023–24	Prem ↓	38	5	9	24	41	78	24	19th	R3	R4	—	—	Jacob Bruun Larsen	7	21,152
2024–25	Champ ↑	46	28	16	2	69	16 (Note: The team conceded just 16 goals in 46 matches—an average of 0.35 per game—setting the best defensive record in English league history. Burnley kept 30 clean sheets (equalling Port Vale's record from 1953–54) and became the first English side to go an entire league season without conceding more than one goal in any match.)	100 (Note: Burnley became the first club to twice gain at least 100 points in a specific division (EFL Championship; 101 points in 2022–23). They also became the first team in Football League history to reach 100 points without winning the title.)	2nd	R5	R2	—	—	Josh Brownhill	18	19,876
2025–26	Prem ↓	38	4	10	24	38	75	22	19th	R4	R3	—	—	Zian Flemming	12	21,005
