= 1982–83 Burnley F.C. season =

English football club season

Burnley
1982–83 season
- Chairman: John Jackson
- Manager: Brian Miller (until January 1983); Frank Casper (caretaker manager)
- Division Two: 21st (relegated)
- FA Cup: Sixth Round
- League Cup: Semi-finals
- Top goalscorer: League: Billy Hamilton (13); All: Billy Hamilton (19)
- Highest home attendance: 23,134 v Sheffield Wednesday (12 March 1983)
- Lowest home attendance: 3,714 v Bury (14 September 1982)
- Average home league attendance: 9,085

The 1982–83 season was Burnley's first season in the second tier of English football. They were initially managed by Brian Miller in his third season in charge of the club until January 1983, when he was replaced by Frank Casper as caretaker manager until the end of the season.

== Appearances and goals ==
No.	Pos	Nat	Player	Total		Division Two		League Cup		FA Cup	
No.	Pos	Nat	Player	Apps	Goals	Apps	Goals	Apps	Goals	Apps	Goals
	MF	(Northern Ireland) NIR	Tommy Cassidy	25	1	16+2	0	3+2	0	1+1	1
	MF	(England) ENG	Phil Cavener	8	0	5+1	0	1+0	0	1+0	0
	DF	(England) ENG	Lee Dixon	3	0	3+0	0	0+0	0	0+0	0
	MF	(England) ENG	Martin Dobson	53	1	39+0	1	9+0	0	5+0	0
	DF	(Scotland) SCO	Willie Donachie	33	0	23+0	0	3+0	0	7+0	0
	FW	(Republic of Ireland) IRL	Terry Donovan	16	6	13+1	6	0+0	0	0+2	0
	MF	(Wales) WAL	Brian Flynn	39	2	28+0	1	4+0	0	7+0	1
	FW	(Northern Ireland) NIR	Billy Hamilton	54	19	39+0	13	8+0	4	7+0	2
	DF	(England) ENG	David Holt	26	0	19+0	0	5+0	0	2+0	0
	DF	(England) ENG	Brian Laws	53	7	38+0	4	9+0	2	6+0	1
	FW	(Republic of Ireland) IRL	Paul McGee	20	6	14+1	2	5+0	4	0+0	0
	DF	(England) ENG	Dave Miller	1	0	0+1	0	0+0	0	0+0	0
	FW	(England) ENG	Ian Muir	2	1	1+1	1	0+0	0	0+0	0
	GK	(England) ENG	Billy O'Rourke	12	0	10+0	0	0+0	0	2+0	0
	DF	(England) ENG	Vince Overson	6	0	2+4	0	0+0	0	0+0	0
	MF	(England) ENG	Mike Phelan	58	5	42+0	3	9+0	2	7+0	0
	DF	(England) ENG	Phil Ray	1	0	1+0	0	0+0	0	0+0	0
	DF	(England) ENG	Derek Scott	49	4	34+2	2	7+0	2	6+0	0
	MF	(England) ENG	Trevor Steven	55	11	38+1	8	9+0	1	7+0	2
	GK	(England) ENG	Alan Stevenson	46	0	32+0	0	9+0	0	5+0	0
	FW	(England) ENG	Steve Taylor	41	15	22+4	12	6+2	1	7+0	2
	DF	(Republic of Ireland) IRL	Mike Walsh	3	0	3+0	0	0+0	0	0+0	0
	DF	(England) ENG	Andy Wharton	25	3	16+2	1	5+0	1	0+2	1
	MF	(England) ENG	Kevin Young	38	2	24+0	1	7+0	1	7+0	0

== Matches ==
=== Football League Division Two ===
Key

- In Result column, Burnley's score shown first
- H = Home match
- A = Away match
- pen. = Penalty kick
- o.g. = Own goal

Results

Date	Opponents	Result	Goalscorers	Attendance
28 August 1982	Bolton Wanderers (H)	0–0		10,562
4 September 1982	Middlesbrough (A)	4–1	Dobson 12', Laws 30', Young 32', Hamilton 59'	8,036
7 September 1982	Carlisle United (H)	4–1	Hamilton (3) 13', 18', 68' (pen.), McGee 33'	7,703
11 September 1982	Rotherham United (H)	1–2	Steven 47'	9,169
18 September 1982	Barnsley (A)	0–3		11,938
25 September 1982	Shrewsbury Town (H)	1–2	Wharton 36'	6,480
2 October 1982	Queens Park Rangers (A)	2–3	Steven (2) 17', 44'	9,165
9 October 1982	Crystal Palace (H)	2–1	Taylor 60', Hamilton 87'	6,480
16 October 1982	Charlton Athletic (A)	1–2	Phelan 19'	5,940
20 October 1982	Leeds United (A)	1–3	Muir 30'	13,827
23 October 1982	Fulham (A)	1–3	Laws 40' (pen.)	9,040
30 October 1982	Oldham Athletic (H)	1–2	Hamilton 23'	7,265
6 November 1982	Newcastle United (A)	0–3		20,961
13 November 1982	Cambridge United (H)	2–1	Taylor (2) 15', 74'	6,039
20 November 1982	Sheffield Wednesday (A)	1–1	Steven 28'	16,329
27 November 1982	Derby County (H)	1–1	McGee 37'	7,513
4 December 1982	Chelsea (A)	1–2	Laws 45' (pen.)	8,164
11 December 1982	Leicester City (H)	2–4	Steven 11', Taylor 50'	6,503
18 December 1982	Grismby Town (A)	2–3	Laws 35' (pen.), Moore 45' (o.g.)	5,448
27 December 1982	Blackburn Rovers (H)	0–1		20,439
28 December 1982	Wolverhampton Wanderers (A)	0–2		21,961
1 January 1983	Sheffield Wednesday (H)	4–1	Taylor (3) 19', 20', 89', Hamilton 59'	9,458
3 January 1983	Middlesbrough (H)	1–1	Scott 45'	9,205
15 January 1983	Bolton Wanderers (A)	0–3		8,894
22 January 1983	Barnsley (H)	3–1	Hamilton 1', Steven 34', Taylor 88' (pen.)	10,358
5 February 1983	Rotherham United (A)	1–1	Taylor 44'	6,079
26 February 1983	Charlton Athletic (H)	7–1	Taylor (3) 25', 80', 84', Hamilton (3) 27', 77', 89', Steven 87'	7,040
5 March 1983	Fulham (H)	1–0	Flynn 22'	8,774
19 March 1983	Newcastle United (H)	1–0	Donovan 71'	14,069
26 March 1983	Cambridge United (A)	0–2		3,549
2 April 1983	Wolverhampton Wanderers (H)	0–1		9,643
4 April 1983	Blackburn Rovers (A)	1–2	Scott 85'	13,434
9 April 1983	Leeds United (H)	1–2	Steven 5'	12,205
12 April 1983	Oldham Athletic (A)	0–3		6,126
16 April 1983	Carlisle United (A)	1–1	Phelan 70'	5,081
23 April 1983	Chelsea (H)	3–0	Hamilton (2) 24', 82', Donovan 65' (pen.)	7,452
30 April 1983	Derby County (A)	0–2		14,674
3 May 1983	Shrewsbury Town (A)	2–1	Phelan 49', Donovan 52'	3,573
7 May 1983	Grimsby Town (H)	1–1	Donovan 17' (pen.)	7,136
10 May 1983	Queens Park Rangers (H)	2–1	Donovan (2) 12', 33'	7,215
14 May 1983	Leicester City (A)	0–0		29,453
17 May 1983	Crystal Palace (A)	0–1		22,743

=== Final league position ===
Pos	Team	Pld	W	D	L	GF	GA	GD	Pts	Relegation
18	Chelsea	42	11	14	17	51	61	−10	47	
19	Grimsby Town	42	12	11	19	45	70	−25	47	
20	Rotherham United (R)	42	10	15	17	45	68	−23	45	Relegation to the Third Division
21	Burnley (R)	42	12	8	22	56	66	−10	44	Relegation to the Third Division
22	Bolton Wanderers (R)	42	11	11	20	42	61	−19	44	Relegation to the Third Division

Rules for classification: 1) Points; 2) Goal difference; 3) Goals scored
(R) Relegated

=== FA Cup ===
Date	Round	Opponents	Result	Goalscorers	Attendance
8 January 1983	Round 3	Carlisle United (A)	2–2	Taylor 1', Wharton 87'	6,998
11 January 1983	Replay	Carlisle United (H)	3–1	Flynn 16', Steven 80', Laws 89' (pen.)	9,439
29 January 1983	Round 4	Swindon Town (H)	3–1	Hamilton (2) 16', 78', Steven 42'	9,786
19 February 1983	Round 5	Crystal Palace (A)	0–0		14,949
28 February 1983	Replay	Crystal Palace (H)	1–0	Taylor 83' (pen.)	16,240
12 March 1983	Round 6	Sheffield Wednesday (H)	1–1	Cassidy 46'	23,134
15 March 1983	Replay	Sheffield Wednesday (A)	0–5		41,731

=== League Cup ===
Date	Round	Opponents	Result	Goalscorers	Attendance
31 August 1982	Round 1 First leg	Bury (A)	5–3	Scott 26', Wharton 36', Phelan 62', Steven 78', McGee 84'	3,111
14 September 1982	Round 1 Second leg	Bury (H)	3–1	Cruickshank 44' (o.g.), Laws 76' (pen.), Hamilton 84'	3,714
5 October 1982	Round 2 First leg	Middlesbrough (H)	3–2	Hamilton 32', Phelan 54', Young 61'	3,909
26 October 1982	Round 2 Second leg	Middlesbrough (A)	1–1	Laws 79' (pen.)	10,328
9 November 1982	Round 3	Coventry City (A)	2–1	McGee (2) 43', 69'	7,437
30 November 1982	Round 4	Birmingham City (H)	3–2	McGee 12', Taylor 35', Brazier 73' (o.g.)	10,726
19 January 1983	Round 5	Tottenham Hotspur (A)	4–1	Roberts (2) 65', 85' (o.g.), Hamilton (2) 75', 89'	30,771
8 February 1983	Semi Final First Leg	Liverpool (A)	0–3		33,520
15 February 1983	Semi Final Second Leg	Liverpool (H)	1–0	Scott 55'	22,228
