= 1980–81 Burnley F.C. season =

English football club season

Burnley
1980–81 season
- Chairman: Bob Lord
- Manager: Brian Miller
- Division Three: 8th
- League Cup: 2nd Round
- FA Cup: 2nd Round
- Anglo-Scottish Cup: Preliminary Group
- Top goalscorer: League: Steve Taylor (16); All: Steve Taylor (17)
- Highest home attendance: 11,075 v Huddersfield Town (14 April 1981)
- Lowest home attendance: 3,354 v Shrewsbury Town (5 August 1980)
- Average home league attendance: 6,469

The 1980–81 season was Burnley's first season in the third tier of English football. They were managed by Brian Miller in his first season in charge of the club.

== Appearances and goals ==
No.	Pos	Nat	Player	Total		Division Three		League Cup		FA Cup		AS Cup	
No.	Pos	Nat	Player	Apps	Goals	Apps	Goals	Apps	Goals	Apps	Goals	Apps	Goals
	DF	(England) ENG	Colin Anderson	2	0	1+1	0	0+0	0	0+0	0	0+0	0
	MF	(Northern Ireland) NIR	Tommy Cassidy	34	3	27+0	1	3+0	1	1+0	0	3+0	1
	MF	(England) ENG	Phil Cavener	50	3	36+4	2	4+0	0	3+0	0	3+0	1
	DF	(Northern Ireland) NIR	Paul Dixon	2	0	0+0	0	0+0	0	0+0	0	2+0	0
	MF	(England) ENG	Martin Dobson	56	9	46+0	7	4+0	1	3+0	0	3+0	1
	FW	(Northern Ireland) NIR	Billy Hamilton	56	10	46+0	9	4+0	0	3+0	1	3+0	0
	DF	(England) ENG	David Holt	44	1	35+0	1	3+0	0	3+0	0	3+0	0
	MF	(England) ENG	Billy Ingham	1	0	0+0	0	0+0	0	0+0	0	1+0	0
	DF	(England) ENG	Brian Laws	48	2	42+0	2	3+0	0	3+0	0	0+0	0
	GK	(England) ENG	Billy O'Rourke	2	0	2+0	0	0+0	0	0+0	0	0+0	0
	DF	(England) ENG	Vince Overson	45	1	39+0	1	1+0	0	3+0	0	2+0	0
	MF	(England) ENG	Mike Phelan	16	2	15+1	2	0+0	0	0+0	0	0+0	0
	MF	(England) ENG	Eric Potts	38	5	34+1	4	0+0	0	3+0	1	0+0	0
	MF	(Scotland) SCO	Stuart Robertson	17	0	17+0	0	0+0	0	0+0	0	0+0	0
	DF	(England) ENG	Billy Rodaway	9	0	5+0	0	3+0	0	0+0	0	1+0	0
	DF	(England) ENG	Derek Scott	38	11	29+0	9	4+0	1	3+0	0	2+0	1
	MF	(England) ENG	Trevor Steven	1	0	0+1	0	0+0	0	0+0	0	0+0	0
	GK	(England) ENG	Alan Stevenson	54	0	44+0	0	4+0	0	3+0	0	3+0	0
	FW	(England) ENG	Steve Taylor	47	17	37+1	16	4+0	0	2+0	0	3+0	1
	DF	(Scotland) SCO	Jim Thomson	7	1	3+0	0	3+0	1	0+0	0	1+0	0
	FW	(England) ENG	Mick Wardrobe	2	0	0+1	0	0+0	0	1+0	0	0+0	0
	DF	(England) ENG	Andy Wharton	7	0	6+0	0	0+0	0	0+1	0	0+0	0
	DF	(England) ENG	Ian Wood	23	0	14+3	0	2+1	0	0+0	0	3+0	0
	MF	(England) ENG	Kevin Young	2	0	0+0	0	0+0	0	0+0	0	0+2	0

== Matches ==
=== Football League Division Three ===
Key

- In Result column, Burnley's score shown first
- H = Home match
- A = Away match
- pen. = Penalty kick
- o.g. = Own goal

Results

Date	Opponents	Result	Goalscorers	Attendance
16 August 1980	Newport County (H)	1–1	Cassidy 12'	6,733
20 August 1980	Walsall (A)	1–3	Taylor 84'	4,714
23 August 1980	Chesterfield (H)	1–0	Dobson 21' (pen.)	5,880
30 August 1980	Charlton Athletic (A)	0–2		5,445
6 September 1980	Colchester United (H)	1–0	Hamilton 25'	4,436
13 September 1980	Exeter City (A)	0–0		4,534
16 September 1980	Hull City (H)	2–0	Young 72', Taylor 88'	4,933
20 September 1980	Chester (A)	0–0		3,660
27 September 1980	Millwall (H)	5–0	Hamilton 12', Dobson 55', Taylor (3) 57', 85', 88'	5,620
30 September 1980	Hull City (A)	0–0		5,497
4 October 1980	Fulham (A)	2–0	Laws 34', Potts 85'	4,673
7 October 1980	Sheffield United (H)	3–2	Taylor (2) 31', 85', Hamilton 38'	7,308
11 October 1980	Rotherham United (H)	1–1	Dobson 48'	9,352
18 October 1980	Portsmouth (A)	2–4	Scott (2) 80', 90'	13,449
21 October 1980	Huddersfield Town (A)	0–0		15,741
25 October 1980	Brentford (H)	2–0	Dobson 42' (pen.), Cavener 67'	7,324
1 November 1980	Swindon Town (A)	3–0	Carter 21' (o.g.), Scott (2) 80', 90'	6,436
4 November 1980	Sheffield United (A)	0–0		14,585
8 November 1980	Reading (H)	1–2	Hamilton 11'	6,925
11 November 1980	Walsall (H)	0–0		5,573
15 November 1980	Newport County (A)	2–1	Hamilton 42', Taylor 44'	5,370
29 November 1980	Gillingham (H)	3–2	Scott 18', Taylor 40', Weatherly 56' (o.g.)	5,797
2 December 1980	Barnsley (H)	0–1		9,109
6 December 1980	Oxford United (A)	2–0	Scott 13', Young 47'	3,513
20 December 1980	Plymouth Argyle (H)	2–1	Taylor (2) 13', 49'	5,695
26 December 1980	Carlisle United (A)	2–3	Scott 66', Taylor 78'	7,136
27 December 1980	Blackpool (H)	4–1	Taylor 14', Potts 44', Laws 67', Holt 87'	10,782
3 January 1981	Brentford (A)	0–0		6,379
27 January 1981	Portsmouth (H)	1–3	Hamilton 7'	6,689
31 January 1981	Chesterfield (A)	0–3		7,637
7 February 1981	Exeter City (H)	1–0	Dobson 42' (pen.)	5,496
14 February 1981	Colchester United (A)	1–2	Hamilton 79'	3,082
17 February 1981	Charlton Athletic (H)	0–1		5,786
21 February 1981	Millwall (A)	2–2	Taylor 63', Hamilton 73'	4,691
28 February 1981	Chester (H)	1–0	Young 80'	4,997
7 March 1981	Fulham (H)	3–0	Hamilton 9', Dobson (2) 27', 73'	5,472
28 March 1981	Barnsley (A)	2–3	Phelan 16', Scott 35'	13,689
31 March 1981	Rotherham United (A)	0–1		9,762
4 April 1981	Swindon Town (H)	0–0		4,736
7 April 1981	Gillingham (A)	0–0		4,412
11 April 1981	Reading (A)	3–1	Taylor (2) 30', 76', Phelan 50'	3,977
14 April 1981	Huddersfield Town (H)	4–2	Brown 16' (o.g.), Scott 39', Overson 45', Potts 57'	11,075
18 April 1981	Blackpool (A)	0–0		7,198
21 April 1981	Carlisle United (H)	0–3		5,126
25 April 1981	Plymouth Argyle (A)	1–2	Cavener 89'	4,331
2 May 1981	Oxford United (H)	1–1	Potts 20'	3,947

=== Final league position ===
Pos	Team	Pld	W	D	L	GF	GA	GD	Pts
6	Portsmouth	46	22	9	15	55	47	+8	53
7	Plymouth Argyle	46	19	14	13	56	44	+12	52
8	Burnley	46	18	14	14	60	48	+12	50
9	Brentford	46	14	19	13	52	49	+3	47
10	Reading	46	18	10	18	62	62	0	46

Source: rsssf.com

=== FA Cup ===
Date	Round	Opponents	Result	Goalscorers	Attendance
22 November 1980	Round 1	Scarborough (H)	1–0	Hamilton 77'	7,789
13 December 1980	Round 2	Port Vale (H)	1–1	Potts 61'	7,497
16 December 1980	Replay	Port Vale (A)	0–2		7,684

=== League Cup ===
Date	Round	Opponents	Result	Goalscorers	Attendance
9 August 1980	Round 1 First leg	Wrexham (A)	3–1	Davies 36' (o.g.), Cassidy 61', Thomson 70'	5,126
12 August 1980	Round 1 Second leg	Wrexham (H)	2–1	Scott 12', Dobson 85' (pen.)	4,448
26 August 1980	Round 2 First leg	West Ham United (H)	0–2		6,673
2 September 1980	Round 2 Second leg	West Ham United (A)	0–4		15,216

=== Anglo-Scottish Cup ===
Date	Round	Opponents	Result	Goalscorers	Attendance
29 July 1980	Preliminary Group	Bury (A)	1–2	Dobson 58' (pen.)	3,887
2 August 1980	Preliminary Group	Oldham Athletic (H)	3–1	Scott 51', Taylor 58', Cavener 84'	4,083
5 August 1980	Preliminary Group	Shrewsbury Town (H)	1–1	Cassidy 1'	3,354
