= 1983–84 Burnley F.C. season =

English football club season

Burnley
1983–84 season
- Chairman: John Jackson
- Manager: John Bond
- Division Three: 12th
- League Cup: 1st Round
- FA Cup: 3rd Round
- Football League Trophy: Northern Semi Final
- Top goalscorer: League: Billy Hamilton (18); All: Billy Hamilton (21)
- Highest home attendance: 12,327 v Bradford City (26 December 1983)
- Lowest home attendance: 1,978 v Darlington (13 March 1984)
- Average home league attendance: 6,625

The 1983–84 season was Burnley's first season in the third tier of English football. They were managed by John Bond in his only season in charge of the club.

== Appearances and goals ==
No.	Pos	Nat	Player	Total		Division Three		League Cup		FA Cup		FL Trophy	
No.	Pos	Nat	Player	Apps	Goals	Apps	Goals	Apps	Goals	Apps	Goals	Apps	Goals
	DF	(England) ENG	Steve Baker	12	1	10+0	0	0+0	0	0+0	0	2+0	1
	FW	(England) ENG	Wayne Biggins	24	11	20+0	8	0+0	0	0+0	0	4+0	3
	MF	(England) ENG	Steve Daley	31	5	20+3	4	0+0	0	2+2	0	4+0	1
	DF	(England) ENG	Lee Dixon	2	0	1+0	0	1+0	0	0+0	0	0+0	0
	MF	(England) ENG	Martin Dobson	34	5	28+0	4	1+0	0	4+0	1	1+0	0
	DF	(Scotland) SCO	Willie Donachie	47	4	37+0	3	1+0	0	5+0	0	4+0	1
	FW	(Republic of Ireland) IRL	Terry Donovan	1	0	0+1	0	0+0	0	0+0	0	0+0	0
	MF	(Wales) WAL	Brian Flynn	54	12	43+0	9	2+0	2	5+0	0	4+0	1
	DF	(England) ENG	Joe Gallagher	2	0	1+0	0	1+0	0	0+0	0	0+0	0
	MF	(England) ENG	Kevin Glendon	4	0	4+0	0	0+0	0	0+0	0	0+0	0
	MF	(Scotland) SCO	Gerry Gow	10	0	8+1	0	1+0	0	0+0	0	0+0	0
	GK	(England) ENG	Roger Hansbury	57	0	46+0	0	2+0	0	5+0	0	4+0	0
	FW	(Northern Ireland) NIR	Billy Hamilton	56	21	46+0	18	2+0	0	5+0	3	3+0	0
	MF	(Scotland) SCO	Tommy Hutchison	57	4	46+0	4	2+0	0	5+0	0	4+0	0
	DF	(England) ENG	Steve Kennedy	9	0	7+0	0	0+1	0	0+0	0	1+0	0
	MF	(England) ENG	Phil Malley	2	0	1+1	0	0+0	0	0+0	0	0+0	0
	DF	(England) ENG	Dave Miller	20	2	15+2	2	0+0	0	0+0	0	2+1	0
	DF	(England) ENG	Vince Overson	48	0	38+0	0	1+0	0	5+0	0	4+0	0
	MF	(England) ENG	Mike Phelan	54	2	44+0	2	2+0	0	4+0	0	4+0	0
	FW	(England) ENG	Kevin Reeves	28	15	20+1	12	2+0	0	5+0	3	0+0	0
	DF	(England) ENG	Derek Scott	50	4	38+2	4	2+0	0	5+0	0	3+0	0
	MF	(England) ENG	Dennis Tueart	19	5	8+7	5	0+0	0	2+0	0	0+2	0
	DF	(England) ENG	Malcolm Waldron	19	1	16+0	0	0+0	0	3+0	1	0+0	0
	DF	(England) ENG	Andy Wharton	9	1	7+0	0	2+0	1	0+0	0	0+0	0
	MF	(England) ENG	Kevin Young	2	0	2+0	0	0+0	0	0+0	0	0+0	0

== Matches ==
=== Football League Division Three ===
Key

- In Result column, Burnley's score shown first
- H = Home match
- A = Away match
- pen. = Penalty kick
- o.g. = Own goal

Results

Date	Opponents	Result	Goalscorers	Attendance
27 August 1983	Hull City (A)	1–4	Reeves 19'	8,394
3 September 1983	Bournemouth (H)	5–1	Dobson 2', Reeves 20', Hamilton (3) 33', 45', 49'	5,525
6 September 1983	Newport County (H)	2–0	Reeves 75', Hamilton 89'	6,755
10 September 1983	Oxford United (A)	2–2	Hamilton 76', Flynn 89'	5,824
24 September 1983	Brentford (A)	0–0		8,042
27 September 1983	Bolton Wanderers (A)	0–0		9,709
1 October 1983	Plymouth Argyle (H)	2–1	Hamilton 65', Scott 88'	6,845
9 October 1983	Millwall (A)	0–2		6,707
13 October 1983	Gillingham (H)	2–3	Dobson 75', Hamilton 80'	5,590
18 October 1983	Southend United (H)	3–0	Hamilton 25', Miller 58', Reeves 70'	5,307
22 October 1983	Lincoln City (A)	1–3	Hamilton 20'	3,793
29 October 1983	Wigan Athletic (H)	3–0	Flynn 36', Hutchison 42', Reeves 89'	7,458
2 November 1983	Exeter City (A)	1–1	Flynn 16'	3,714
5 November 1983	Preston North End (H)	2–1	Reeves 19', Hamilton 42'	8,095
8 November 1983	Sheffield United (H)	2–1	Dobson 2', Donachie 59'	9,574
12 November 1983	Bristol Rovers (A)	1–2	Reeves 42'	7,021
26 November 1983	Port Vale (H)	7–0	Hamilton 4', Reeves (3) 13' (pen.), 45', 49', Hutchison 19', Flynn 24', Donachie 27'	6,385
3 December 1983	Rotherham United (A)	1–1	Flynn 9'	5,544
17 December 1983	Wimbledon (A)	4–1	Reeves 22', Hamilton 25', Scott (2) 43', 63'	2,883
26 December 1983	Bradford City (H)	1–2	Jackson 4' (o.g.)	12,327
27 December 1983	Walsall (A)	1–1	Hamilton 70'	8,131
31 December 1983	Scunthorpe United (H)	5–0	Flynn 5', Hutchison 22', Dobson 37', Reeves 55' (pen.), Tueart 89'	7,668
2 January 1984	Orient (A)	2–1	Flynn 34', Hamilton 75'	4,457
21 January 1984	Sheffield United (A)	0–0		13,892
4 February 1984	Plymouth Argyle (A)	1–1	Tueart 57'	5,104
11 February 1984	Brentford (H)	2–2	Hamilton 36', Tueart 42'	7,027
14 February 1984	Exeter City (H)	4–0	Tueart 17' (pen.), Flynn 66', Phelan 80', Biggins 83'	5,968
18 February 1984	Wigan Athletic (A)	0–1		7,509
25 February 1984	Lincoln City (H)	4–0	Biggins (3) 12', 24', 59', Flynn 62'	6,652
2 March 1984	Southend United (A)	2–2	Hutchison 20', Hamilton 90'	2,864
6 March 1984	Preston North End (A)	2–4	Donachie 40', Tueart 89'	8,813
10 March 1984	Bristol Rovers (H)	0–0		6,306
17 March 1984	Millwall (H)	1–0	Biggins 33'	5,088
24 March 1984	Gillingham (A)	1–0	Biggins 79'	4,319
27 March 1984	Oxford United (H)	1–1	Daley 20' (pen.)	8,058
31 March 1984	Bolton Wanderers (H)	2–2	Hamilton 45', Miller 89'	8,350
7 April 1984	Newport County (A)	0–1		2,306
9 April 1984	Bournemouth (A)	0–1		4,113
14 April 1984	Rotherham United (H)	2–2	Biggins 29', Scott 55'	4,676
21 April 1984	Bradford City (A)	1–2	Biggins 27'	5,578
23 April 1984	Walsall (H)	0–2		3,948
28 April 1984	Port Vale (A)	3–2	Daley (3) 25', 68', 80'	3,061
5 May 1984	Orient (H)	2–3	Hamilton 1', Phelan 7'	3,301
7 May 1984	Scunthorpe United (A)	0–4		2,720
12 May 1984	Wimbledon (H)	0–2		3,382
15 May 1984	Hull City (H)	0–2		8,051

=== Final league position ===
Pos	Team	Pld	W	D	L	GF	GA	GD	Pts
10	Bolton Wanderers	46	18	10	18	56	60	−4	64
11	Orient	46	18	9	19	71	81	−10	63
12	Burnley	46	16	14	16	76	61	+15	62
13	Newport County	46	16	14	16	58	75	−17	62
14	Lincoln City	46	17	10	19	59	62	−3	61

=== FA Cup ===
Date	Round	Opponents	Result	Goalscorers	Attendance
19 November 1983	Round 1	Hyde United (A)	2–0	Waldron 44', Reeves 85' (pen.)	7,723
2 December 1983	Round 2	Chesterfield (A)	2–2	Dobson 20', Reeves 43'	5,788
19 December 1983	Replay	Chesterfield (H)	3–2	Reeves 6', Hamilton (2) 14', 83'	8,286
7 January 1984	Round 3	Oxford United (H)	0–0		11,672
11 January 1984	Replay	Oxford United (A)	1–2	Hamilton 48'	10,497

=== League Cup ===
Date	Round	Opponents	Result	Goalscorers	Attendance
30 August 1983	Round 1 First leg	Crewe Alexandra (A)	0–1		3,043
13 September 1983	Round 1 Second leg	Crewe Alexandra (H)	3–4	Flynn (2) 11', 54' (pen.)	5,659

=== Football League Trophy ===
Date	Round	Opponents	Result	Goalscorers	Attendance
21 February 1984	Round 1	Bolton Wanderers (H)	2–1	Donachie 7', Biggins 84'	3,355
13 March 1984	Round 2	Darlington (H)	2–1	Biggins 50', Baker 70'	1,978
20 March 1984	Northern Quarter Final	Doncaster Rovers (A)	3–1 (a.e.t.)	Flynn 28', Daley 101', Biggins 105'	3,504
17 April 1984	Northern Semi Final	Tranmere Rovers (A)	0–2 (a.e.t.)		3,928
