= 1899–1900 Burnley F.C. season =

English football club season

Burnley
1899-1900 season

The 1899–1900 Burnley F.C. season was the 18th season in the history of Burnley Football Club and their 12th in the Football League.

== Football League ==
=== Match results ===
Date	Opponents	Result	Goalscorers	Attendance
2 September 1899	Glossop North End (A)	0–2		6,000
9 September 1899	Stoke City (H)	2–2	Chadwick, Bowes	6,500
16 September 1899	Sunderland (A)	1–2	Chadwick	12,500
23 September 1899	West Bromwich Albion (H)	2–0	Chadwick, Morrison	10,027
30 September 1899	Everton (A)	0–2		15,000
7 October 1899	Blackburn Rovers (H)	1–0	Bowes	12,855
14 October 1899	Derby County (A)	1–4	Chadwick	10,000
21 October 1899	Bury (H)	1–0	Bowes	6,500
28 October 1899	Notts County (A)	1–6	Chadwick	10,000
4 November 1899	Manchester City (H)	2–0	Jenkinson, Taylor	5,000
11 November 1899	Sheffield United (A)	0–0		6,000
18 November 1899	Newcastle United (H)	1–3	Jenkinson	5,000
25 November 1899	Aston Villa (A)	0–2		10,000
2 December 1899	Liverpool (H)	2–1	Bowes, Miller	5,000
9 December 1899	Wolverhampton Wanderers (H)	0–1		5,000
16 December 1899	Preston North End (A)	1–1	Bowes	7,000
23 December 1899	Nottingham Forest (H)	2–2	Hartley, Miller	5,000
26 December 1899	Stoke City (A)	0–3		10,000
30 December 1899	Glossop North End (H)	3–1	Chadwick (3)	—
1 January 1900	Blackburn Rovers (A)	0–2		14,000
13 January 1900	Sunderland (H)	3–1	Hannigan, Chadwick, Hartley	5,000
20 January 1900	West Bromwich Albion (A)	0–2		3,427
3 February 1900	Everton (H)	3–1	Morrison, Hartley, Chadwick	4,000
17 February 1900	Derby County (H)	1–2	Hartley	5,000
3 March 1900	Notts County (H)	3–0	Hannigan (2), Morrison	4,000
10 March 1900	Manchester City (A)	0–1		13,000
14 March 1900	Bury (A)	1–1	Place	2,000
24 March 1900	Newcastle United (A)	0–2		12,000
31 March 1900	Aston Villa (H)	1–2	Bowes	6,000
7 April 1900	Liverpool (A)	1–0	Hartley	10,000
14 April 1900	Wolverhampton Wanderers (A)	0–3		5,000
21 April 1900	Preston North End (H)	0–1		8,000
23 April 1900	Sheffield United (H)	1–0	Davidson	6,000
28 April 1900	Nottingham Forest (A)	0–4		3,000

=== Final league position ===
Pos	Team	Pld	W	D	L	GF	GA	GAv	Pts	Relegation
14	Blackburn Rovers	34	13	4	17	49	61	0.803	30	
15	Notts County	34	9	11	14	46	60	0.767	29	
16	Preston North End	34	12	4	18	38	48	0.792	28	
17	Burnley (R)	34	11	5	18	34	54	0.630	27	Relegation to the Second Division
18	Glossop (R)	34	4	10	20	31	74	0.419	18	Relegation to the Second Division

Source: World Football
Rules for classification: 1) Points; 2) Goal average; 3) Goals scored
(R) Relegated

== FA Cup ==
Round	Date	Opponents	Result	Goalscorers	Attendance
First round	27 January 1900	Bury (H)	0–1		6,000
