= 1898–99 Burnley F.C. season =

English football club season

Burnley
1898-99 season
- Manager: Harry Bradshaw
- First Division: 3rd
- FA Cup: First round

The 1898–99 Burnley F.C. season was the 17th season in the history of Burnley Football Club and their 11th in the Football League.

== Football League ==
=== Match results ===
Date	Opponents	Result	Goalscorers	Attendance
3 September 1898	Notts County (H)	1–1	Toman	6,500
5 September 1898	Preston North End (H)	3–1	Morrison (2), Place	—
10 September 1898	Stoke (A)	1–4	Morrison	—
17 September 1898	Aston Villa (H)	2–4	Bowes, Toman	8,000
24 September 1898	Bury (A)	1–1	Place	8,000
1 October 1898	Sheffield United (A)	1–1	Bowes	10,000
8 October 1898	Newcastle United (H)	2–1	Toman (2)	6,000
15 October 1898	Preston North End (A)	1–1	Toman	8,000
22 October 1898	Liverpool (H)	2–1	Toman, Place	10,000
29 October 1898	Nottingham Forest (A)	1–0	Place	5,000
5 November 1898	Bolton Wanderers (H)	2–0	Ross, Lee (o.g.)	6,000
12 November 1898	Derby County (A)	1–2	Toman	8,000
19 November 1898	West Bromwich Albion (H)	1–1	Toman	7,500
26 November 1898	Blackburn Rovers (H)	2–0	McLintock (pen.), Toman	12,000
3 December 1898	Sheffield Wednesday (H)	5–0	Ross (4), Toman	6,000
10 December 1898	Sunderland (A)	1–0	Bowes	8,500
17 December 1898	Wolverhampton Wanderers (H)	4–2	McInnes, Bowes (2), Place	4,000
24 December 1898	Everton (A)	0–4		20,000
26 December 1898	Blackburn Rovers (A)	2–0	Toman, Ross	20,000
31 December 1898	Notts County (A)	2–2	Place (b. 1869), Bowes	12,000
3 January 1899	Bolton Wanderers (A)	0–2		8,000
14 January 1899	Aston Villa (A)	0–4		22,000
21 January 1899	Bury (H)	2–1	Bowes (2)	2,000
4 February 1899	Newcastle United (A)	1–4	Bowes	20,000
18 February 1899	Liverpool (A)	0–2		12,000
6 March 1899	Nottingham Forest (H)	1–1	Place	2,000
11 March 1899	Derby County (H)	2–1	Place, Bowes	7,000
18 March 1899	West Bromwich Albion (A)	1–0	Ferguson	2,330
31 March 1899	Sheffield United (H)	1–0	McLintock (pen.)	7,000
1 April 1899	Sheffield Wednesday (A)	0–1		6,000
8 April 1899	Sunderland (H)	1–0	Ferguson	6,000
15 April 1899	Wolverhampton Wanderers (A)	0–4		5,000
17 April 1899	Stoke City (H)	1–1	Ferguson	4,000
22 April 1899	Everton (H)	0–0		—

=== Final league position ===
Pos	Team	Pld	W	D	L	GF	GA	GAv	Pts
1	Aston Villa (C)	34	19	7	8	76	40	1.900	45
2	Liverpool	34	19	5	10	49	33	1.485	43
3	Burnley	34	15	9	10	45	47	0.957	39
4	Everton	34	15	8	11	48	41	1.171	38
5	Notts County	34	12	13	9	47	51	0.922	37

Source: World Football
Rules for classification: 1) Points; 2) Goal average; 3) Goals scored
(C) Champions

== FA Cup ==
Round	Date	Opponents	Result	Goalscorers	Attendance
First round	28 January 1899	Sheffield United (H)	2–2	Toman, Bowes	11,500
First round replay	2 February 1899	Sheffield United (A)	1–2	Ross (pen.)	11,000
