= McLintock =

McLintock may refer to:

== Surname ==
- Alex McLintock (1853–1931), also known as Sandy McLintock, Scottish international footballer
- Alexander Hare McLintock (1903–1968), New Zealand teacher, university lecturer, historian and artist
- David McLintock (1930–2003), British scholar and translator of German literature
- Frank McLintock (born 1939), former Scotland international footballer and football manager
- Tom McLintock, former Scottish professional footballer
- William McLintock (disambiguation), several people

== Other ==
- McLintock!, 1963 American western with strongly comedic elements
- McLintock baronets, title in the Baronetage of the United Kingdom
