= William McLintock =

William McLintock may refer to:

- Sir William McLintock, 1st Baronet (1873–1947), British accountant
- Sir William Traven McLintock, 3rd Baronet (1931–1987) of the McLintock baronets
- W. F. P. McLintock (William Francis Porter McLintock, 1887–1960), Scottish geologist and museum director
