= Kevin Young (footballer) =

English footballer

Personal information
- Full name: Kevin Young
- Date of birth: 12 August 1961 (age 65)
- Place of birth: Sunderland, Tyne and Wear, England
- Height: 5 ft 8 in (1.73 m)
- Position: Midfielder

Youth career
- Burnley

Senior career*
Years	Team	Apps	(Gls)
1979–1984	Burnley	122	(11)
1983	→ Torquay United (loan)	3	(1)
1983–1984	→ Port Vale (loan)	28	(4)
1984–1987	Bury	88	(10)
1987–1990	Utrecht	71	(1)
Total		312	(27)
- * Club domestic league appearances and goals

Kevin Young (born 12 August 1961) is an English former footballer who played for Burnley, Torquay United, Port Vale, Bury, Utrecht, and Murton. He won promotion out of the Third Division with Burnley in 1981–82 and out of the Fourth Division with Bury in 1984–85.

== Career ==
Young began his career as an apprentice at Burnley, turning professional under Harry Potts in May 1979 after making his league debut in the 1978–79 season. He made 27 appearances in the 1979–80 season, as the "Clarets" were relegated out of the Second Division under the stewardship of Brian Miller. During the 1980–81 campaign, he scored his first goal in the Football League on 16 September, in a 2–0 win over Hull City at Turf Moor, and also claimed goals in victories over Oxford United and Chester. He scored seven goals in 49 appearances in the 1981–82 season, as Burnley won promotion as Third Division champions. He scored two goals in 38 games in the 1982–83 season, as caretaker manager Frank Casper failed to steer the club away from relegation. He featured just twice in the 1983–84 season, and it became apparent that he had no future at the club under new boss John Bond. In November 1983, he moved to Torquay United on loan and scored one goal in three Fourth Division games for Bruce Rioch's "Gulls"; his spell at Plainmoor was brief. In December 1983, he moved on loan to Port Vale until the end of the season, becoming John Rudge's first signing as "Valiants" manager. Adding balance to the midfield, he scored four goals in 28 Third Division games. After returning to Burnley from Vale Park, he made a permanent transfer to Lancashire rivals Bury.

He helped Martin Dobson's "Shakers" to win promotion out of the Fourth Division in 1984–85. They then finished one place and three points above the Third Division relegation zone in 1985–86 before rising into mid-table in 1986–87. He scored ten goals in 88 league games at Gigg Lane. He then spent three years in the Netherlands with Han Berger's Utrecht, helping the Eredivisie club to finish tenth in 1987–88, 13th in 1988–89, and 14th in 1989–90. He later returned to England to play non-League football for Murton.

== Career statistics ==
Appearances and goals by club, season and competition
Club	Season	League			FA Cup		Other		Total	
Club	Season	Division	Apps	Goals	Apps	Goals	Apps	Goals	Apps	Goals
Burnley	1978–79	Second Division	1	0	0	0	0	0	1	0
Burnley	1979–80	Second Division	25	0	2	0	0	0	27	0
Burnley	1980–81	Third Division	31	3	3	0	5	0	39	3
Burnley	1981–82	Third Division	39	7	6	0	4	0	49	7
Burnley	1982–83	Second Division	24	1	7	0	7	1	38	2
Burnley	1983–84	Third Division	2	0	0	0	0	0	2	0
Burnley	Total		122	11	18	0	16	1	156	12
Torquay United (loan)	1983–84	Fourth Division	3	1	1	0	0	0	4	1
Port Vale (loan)	1983–84	Third Division	28	4	0	0	2	0	30	4
Bury	1984–85	Fourth Division	32	4	1	0	4	0	37	4
Bury	1985–86	Third Division	44	6	8	2	3	1	55	9
Bury	1986–87	Third Division	12	0	0	0	4	0	16	0
Bury	Total		88	10	9	2	11	1	108	13

== Honours ==
Burnley

- Football League Third Division: 1981–82

Bury

- Football League Fourth Division fourth-place promotion: 1984–85
