= Steve Taylor (footballer) =

English footballer

Personal information
- Full name: Steven Jeffrey Taylor
- Date of birth: 18 October 1955 (age 71)
- Place of birth: Royton, England
- Height: 5 ft 10 in (1.78 m)
- Position: Forward

Senior career*
Years	Team	Apps	(Gls)
1974–1977	Bolton Wanderers	40	(16)
1975	→ Port Vale (loan)	4	(2)
1977–1979	Oldham Athletic	47	(25)
1979	Luton Town	20	(1)
1979–1980	Mansfield Town	37	(7)
1980–1983	Burnley	86	(37)
1983–1984	Wigan Athletic	30	(7)
1984	Stockport County	26	(8)
1984–1986	Rochdale	84	(42)
1986–1987	Preston North End	5	(2)
1987–1988	Burnley	45	(6)
1988–1989	Rochdale	17	(4)
1993	Mossley	4	(1)
Total		445	(158)

Managerial career
- 1993: Mossley
- * Club domestic league appearances and goals

Steven Jeffrey Taylor (born 18 October 1955) is an English former footballer. A forward, he scored 157 goals in 441 league games in a 15-year career in the Football League.

He began his career at Bolton Wanderers, turning professional in October 1973. He was loaned out to Port Vale in October 1975, before signing with Oldham Athletic in October 1977 for £38,000. He transferred to Luton Town in January 1979 for a £75,000 fee before moving on to Mansfield Town for the same fee a few months later. He signed with Burnley in 1980, and helped the "Clarets" to the Third Division title in 1981–82. He switched to Wigan Athletic in 1983 before spending a brief spell with Stockport County the following year. He was signed by Rochdale in November 1984 and had a prolific two-year spell at the club before he was bought by Preston North End for £20,000. He quickly returned to Burnley and featured in the 1988 Football League Trophy final. He returned to Rochdale for the 1988–89 campaign before he retired from professional football. He later had an unsuccessful time as manager of Northern Premier League club Mossley in 1993.

== Playing career ==
Taylor was an apprentice with Bolton Wanderers and turned professional in October 1973, with the "Trotters" lying in the Second Division under the stewardship of Jimmy Armfield. He joined Roy Sproson's Port Vale on loan in October 1975. It took until 1 November for him to earn his Third Division debut for the "Valiants"; a 1–0 win over Rotherham United at Vale Park. Seven days later he scored a brace past Sheffield Wednesday in a 3–0 victory at Hillsborough Stadium. Upon his return to Burnden Park, he helped new boss Ian Greaves to take Wanderers to a fourth-place finish in 1975–76 – they were just one point off Bristol City and West Bromwich Albion, who were both promoted. Bolton again finished fourth in 1976–77, lying just one point behind promoted Nottingham Forest.

In October 1977, Taylor signed for his hometown club Oldham Athletic for a fee of £38,000. He finished as the club's top scorer in 1977–78 with 21 goals; the "Latics" enjoyed a good season under Jimmy Frizzell, and finished eighth in the Second Division. Taylor then left Boundary Park and moved to Luton Town in January 1979 for a £75,000 fee. The "Hatters" finished two places and two points above the Second Division relegation zone in 1978–79. Taylor only hit one goal in 20 league games at Kenilworth Road. David Pleat sold Taylor on to Mansfield Town, again for £75,000. He could not prevent Mick Jones's "Stags" from occupying one of the Third Division relegation places in 1979–80, and did not stay on for long at Field Mill.

Taylor was then signed by Brian Miller's Burnley. He scored a hat-trick past Millwall in a 5–0 win at Turf Moor on 27 September 1980, and finished as the club's top scorer in 1980–81 with 17 goals in 47 games. He then hit 14 goals in 31 appearances in 1981–82, as the club finished as champions of the Third Division. He scored a hat-trick past Sheffield Wednesday in a 4–1 win on 1 January 1983, and another hat-trick past Charlton Athletic in a 7–1 home win on 26 February. He hit 15 goals in 41 appearances in 1982–83, though this was not enough to save the club from relegation.

He joined Third Division rivals Wigan Athletic for the 1983–84 season and finished as the club's top scorer with 10 goals. Harry McNally did not keep Taylor on at Springfield Park, and he instead started the 1984–85 campaign in the Fourth Division with Eric Webster's Stockport County. His stay at Edgeley Park was brief, and Taylor joined up with Vic Halom at Rochdale in November 1984 and scored 14 goals in 33 games in 1984–85. He then finished as the Fourth Division's joint-top scorer (with Southend United's Richard Cadette) in 1985–86 with 25 league goals. Seven goals in 13 games at the start of the 1986–87 season saw him snapped up by John McGrath at Preston North End for £20,000. The "Lilywhites" went on to win promotion out of the Fourth Division, but Taylor only featured in five league games at Deepdale. He remained in the Fourth Division and returned to Burnley after former boss Brian Miller was re-appointed as manager. He hit six goals in 54 games in 1987–88 and featured in the 1988 Football League Trophy final at Wembley, which ended in a 2–0 defeat to Wolverhampton Wanderers. He made four appearances in 1988–89 before returning to Spotland. He hit four goals in 17 league appearances in his second spell for "Dale", and left the Football League in summer 1989.

== Managerial career ==
After over four years out of the game, Taylor was appointed manager of Northern Premier League Division One side Mossley in August 1993. He left after just one win in 13 games. While manager of Mossley, he played four times, scoring once. The club went on to finish the 1993–94 season in 17th place.

== Career statistics ==
Appearances and goals by club, season and competition
Club	Season	League			FA Cup		Other		Total	
Club	Season	Division	Apps	Goals	Apps	Goals	Apps	Goals	Apps	Goals
Bolton Wanderers	1974–75	Second Division	5	0	0	0	0	0	5	0
Bolton Wanderers	1975–76	Second Division	3	0	0	0	0	0	3	0
Bolton Wanderers	1976–77	Second Division	31	16	1	0	10	4	42	20
Bolton Wanderers	1977–78	Second Division	1	0	0	0	4	0	5	0
Bolton Wanderers	Total		40	16	1	0	14	4	55	20
Port Vale (loan)	1975–76	Third Division	4	2	0	0	0	0	4	2
Oldham Athletic	1977–78	Second Division	32	20	2	1	0	0	34	21
Oldham Athletic	1978–79	Second Division	15	5	0	0	8	2	23	7
Oldham Athletic	Total		47	25	2	1	8	2	57	28
Luton Town	1978–79	Second Division	20	1	0	0	0	0	20	1
Mansfield Town	1979–80	Third Division	37	7	3	0	8	3	48	10
Burnley	1980–81	Third Division	38	16	2	0	7	1	47	17
Burnley	1981–82	Third Division	22	9	4	3	5	0	31	12
Burnley	1982–83	Second Division	26	12	7	2	7	1	40	15
Burnley	Total		86	37	13	5	19	2	118	44
Wigan Athletic	1983–84	Third Division	30	7	4	3	3	0	37	10
Stockport County	1983–84	Fourth Division	12	6	0	0	0	0	12	6
Stockport County	1984–85	Fourth Division	14	2	1	1	4	2	19	5
Stockport County	Total		26	8	1	1	4	2	31	11
Rochdale	1984–85	Fourth Division	30	12	0	0	3	2	33	14
Rochdale	1985–86	Fourth Division	45	25	4	5	3	1	52	31
Rochdale	1986–87	Fourth Division	9	5	1	0	4	2	14	7
Rochdale	Total		84	42	5	5	10	5	99	52
Preston North End	1986–87	Fourth Division	5	2	0	0	0	0	5	2
Burnley	1987–88	Fourth Division	42	6	1	0	11	0	54	6
Burnley	1988–89	Fourth Division	3	0	0	0	1	0	4	0
Burnley	Total		45	6	1	0	12	0	58	6
Rochdale	1988–89	Fourth Division	17	4	0	0	0	0	17	4
Career total			441	157	30	15	76	18	547	190

== Honours ==
Burnley

- Football League Third Division: 1981–82
- Associate Members' Cup runner-up: 1987–88

Preston North End

- Football League Fourth Division second-place promotion: 1986–87
