= Dick Smith (footballer, born 1877) =

English footballer

Personal information
- Full name: Richard Smith
- Date of birth: 29 October 1877
- Place of birth: Workington, England
- Date of death: 10 December 1959 (aged 82)
- Place of death: Workington, England
- Position: Centre forward

Senior career*
Years	Team	Apps	(Gls)
	Workington	?	(?)
1904–1910	Burnley	174	(71)
- * Club domestic league appearances and goals

Richard Smith (29 October 1877 – 10 December 1959) was an English professional footballer who played as a centre forward. He started his career with hometown club Workington before moving to Football League side Burnley in 1904.
