= Sir William McLintock, 1st Baronet =

British accountant

Sir William McLintock Bt GBE CVO
- Born: 26 September 1873
- Died: 8 May 1947 (aged 73)
- Occupation: Accountant

Sir William McLintock, 1st Baronet (26 September 1873 – 8 May 1947) was a British accountant. He was a senior partner in the firm of Thomson McLintock & Company, chartered accountants.

== See also ==
- McLintock baronets
