= Willie Ferguson (footballer, fl. 1895–1900) =

Scottish footballer

Personal information
- Full name: William Ferguson
- Place of birth: Scotland
- Position: Outside left

Senior career*
Years	Team	Apps	(Gls)
1895–1897	Jordanhill		
1895–1897	Maryhill		
1895–1897	Celtic	26	(14)
1897–1900	Burnley	33	(7)
1900	Manchester City	0	(0)

International career
1896	Scottish League XI	1	(0)
- * Club domestic league appearances and goals

William Ferguson was a Scottish professional association footballer who played as an outside left. He won the Scottish Football League title in 1895–96 while playing with Celtic, and in the same year represented the Scottish Football League XI and played in two international trial matches, but a full cap for Scotland never came his way. He then moved to England to join Burnley in early 1897.
