= Richard Hannigan =

Scottish footballer

Personal information
- Place of birth: Scotland
- Position: Winger

Senior career*
Years	Team	Apps	(Gls)
1898–1899	Notts County	15	(2)
1899	Woolwich Arsenal	1	(0)
1899–1900	Burnley	8	(3)
- * Club domestic league appearances and goals

Richard Hannigan was a Scottish professional footballer who played as a winger during the late 1890s.
