= Steve Kennedy (footballer) =

English footballer

Personal information
- Full name: Stephen Kennedy
- Date of birth: 22 July 1965 (age 61)
- Place of birth: Audenshaw, England
- Height: 6 ft 0 in (1.83 m)
- Position: Full back

Senior career*
Years	Team	Apps	(Gls)
1983–1987	Burnley	18	(0)
- * Club domestic league appearances and goals

Stephen Kennedy (born 22 July 1965) is an English former professional footballer who played as a full back for Burnley in the Football League.
