= Bill Holden (footballer) =

English footballer

Personal information
- Full name: William Holden
- Date of birth: 1 April 1928
- Place of birth: Bolton, England
- Date of death: 26 January 2011 (aged 82)
- Place of death: Morecambe, England
- Position: Centre forward

Senior career*
Years	Team	Apps	(Gls)
1949–1955	Burnley	187	(75)
1955–1956	Sunderland	19	(5)
1956–1959	Stockport County	87	(37)
1959–1962	Bury	101	(33)
1962–1963	Halifax Town	37	(11)
- * Club domestic league appearances and goals

William Holden (1 April 1928 – 26 January 2011) was an English professional footballer who played as a centre forward for several clubs in the Football League.
