= Joe Taylor (footballer, born 1874) =

English footballer

Personal information
- Full name: Joseph Taylor
- Date of birth: 1874
- Place of birth: Burnley, England
- Date of death: 21 August 1938 (aged 63–64)
- Position: Centre half

Senior career*
Years	Team	Apps	(Gls)
1894–1907	Burnley	323	(12)
Total		323	(12)
- * Club domestic league appearances and goals

Joseph Taylor (1874 – 21 August 1938) was an English professional footballer who played as a centre half. He played for 323 games and scored 12 goals in the Football League for Burnley during the 1890s and 1900s. After his retirement from football, he became a groundsman at Burnley.
