= Angus McInnes =

Scottish footballer

Personal information
- Full name: Angus McInnes
- Place of birth: Scotland
- Position: Inside forward

Senior career*
Years	Team	Apps	(Gls)
1897–1899	Burnley	6	(2)
1902–1903	Burnley	32	(2)
	Padiham	?	(?)
- * Club domestic league appearances and goals

Angus McInnes was a Scottish professional footballer who played as an inside forward. He had two spells for Burnley in the English Football League, as well as playing non-league football with nearby Padiham.
