= Mark Allen (footballer) =

English footballer

Personal information
- Full name: Mark Stephen Allen
- Date of birth: 18 December 1963 (age 62)
- Place of birth: Newcastle-upon-Tyne, England
- Position: Striker

Senior career*
Years	Team	Apps	(Gls)
1981–1983	Burnley	2	(1)
1983–1984	Tranmere Rovers	10	(0)
1984	P-Iirot	18	(13)
1984–1985	Runcorn	7	(1)
Total		37	(15)
- * Club domestic league appearances and goals

Mark Stephen Allen (born 18 December 1963) is an English former professional footballer who played as a striker.

In 1984, Allen had a spell with second-level side Pallo-Iirot in Finland.
