= Paul Cruickshank =

English professional footballer

Personal information
- Full name: John Paul Cruickshank
- Date of birth: 18 January 1960 (age 66)
- Place of birth: Oldham, England
- Position: Midfielder

Senior career*
| Years | Team | Apps | (Gls) |
| 1978–1979 | Blackpool | 0 | (0) |
| 1979–1983 | Bury | 82 | (4) |
| 1983–1984 | Altrincham | 21 | (1) |
| Total | | 103 | (5) |
- * Club domestic league appearances and goals

John Paul Cruickshank (born 18 January 1960) is an English former professional footballer who played in the Football League as a midfielder.
