= Cornelius Hogan =

Maltese footballer

Personal information
- Full name: Cornelius Hogan
- Date of birth: 1878
- Place of birth: Malta
- Date of death: 14 March 1909 (aged 30–31)
- Position: Centre forward

Senior career*
| Years | Team | Apps | (Gls) |
| 1897–1898 | Aston Villa | 0 | (0) |
| 1898–1899 | Millwall Athletic | ? | (?) |
| 1899–1900 | New Brighton Tower | 18 | (1) |
| 1900–1901 | Watford | 2 | (0) |
| 1901–1903 | Burnley | 43 | (17) |
| 1903 | Fulham | 2 | (1) |
| 1903–1904 | Swindon Town | 13 | (5) |
| 1904-1905 | St Helens Recreation | ? | (?) |
| 1905–1906 | Nelson | ? | (?) |
| 1906 | Rossendale United | 9 | (7) |
- * Club domestic league appearances and goals

Cornelius Hogan (1878 – 14 March 1909) was a Maltese professional footballer who played as a centre forward. He played in the English Football League for New Brighton Tower and Burnley.
