= Phil Ray =

English footballer

Personal information
- Full name: Philip Ray
- Date of birth: 21 November 1964 (age 61)
- Place of birth: Wallsend, England
- Position: Full back

Youth career
- Wallsend Boys Club

Senior career*
| Years | Team | Apps | (Gls) |
| 1981–1984 | Burnley | 1 | (0) |
| 1983 | → Hartlepool United (loan) | 5 | (1) |
- * Club domestic league appearances and goals

Philip Ray (born 21 November 1964) is an English former professional footballer who played as a full back.
