= Eric Potts (footballer) =

English footballer

Personal information
- Full name: Eric Thomas Potts
- Date of birth: 16 March 1950 (age 76)
- Place of birth: Liverpool, England
- Height: 5 ft 6 in (1.68 m)
- Position: Winger

Senior career*
Years	Team	Apps	(Gls)
1970–1977	Sheffield Wednesday	159	(21)
1977–1978	Brighton & Hove Albion	33	(4)
1978–1980	Preston North End	57	(5)
1980–1982	Burnley	56	(5)
1982–1984	Bury	51	(7)
Total		356	(42)
- * Club domestic league appearances and goals

Eric Thomas Potts (born 16 March 1950) is an English former professional footballer who played as a right winger.

== Honours ==
Burnley

- Football League Third Division: 1981–82
