= Paul Dixon (footballer, born 1960) =

Northern Irish footballer (born 1960)

Personal information
- Full name: Paul Kenneth Dixon
- Date of birth: 22 February 1960 (age 66)
- Place of birth: Derry, Northern Ireland
- Position: Central defender

Youth career
- 19xx–1976: Waterside Youth Club
- 1976–1979: Burnley

Senior career*
Years	Team	Apps	(Gls)
1979–1983	Burnley	24	(1)
1983–19xx	Glentoran	?	(?)
- * Club domestic league appearances and goals

Paul Kenneth Dixon (born 22 February 1960) is a Northern Irish retired professional footballer who played as a central defender. He joined English club Burnley as a 16-year-old and went on to play 24 Football League matches for the Turf Moor club but missed long periods through injury during his time in England. In 1983, following his release from Burnley, Dixon moved back to Ireland to play for Glentoran.

== Career ==
Born in Derry, Northern Ireland, BornDixon played youth football with the Waterside Club in Derry City before joining recently relegated English Football League Second Division side Burnley on trial during the summer of 1976. He was subsequently signed as an apprentice by the Lancashire club and after spending two years in the youth team he was offered his first professional contract in June 1978, although he did not make his senior debut until the following season. Although he had played on the right wing when he joined Burnley, Dixon had been converted to a central defender during his time with the club.

He started his first competitive match for Burnley on 10 November 1979, lining up alongside Vince Overson for the 1–1 draw with Leicester City away at Filbert Street, although he was later substituted for Billy Rodaway. He went on to play 14 more times in the league, scoring once, forming a regular partnership with Overson in the heart of the defense. However, injury forced him to miss the remainder of the campaign as the team suffered relegation to the Third Division for the first time in their history.

The injury he had suffered caused Dixon to miss almost all of the following season, as he made only two first-team appearances during the 1980–81 campaign. He was used sparingly in the league in 1981–82, making nine appearances in total as the team were crowned champions of the Third Division, although he did play four matches in the FA Cup as Burnley reached the Fourth Round before losing 1–0 to Shrewsbury Town at Gay Meadow in January 1982. Dixon played his final game for Burnley in the 5–3 home defeat to Southend United on 20 April 1982. He remained at the club for a further year but did not appear for the first team again and was released in the summer of 1983. He subsequently returned to Northern Ireland, signing for Belfast-based club Glentoran, where he ended his playing career.

== Career statistics ==
Appearances and goals by club, season and competition
Club	Season	League			FA Cup		Other		Total	
Club	Season	Division	Apps	Goals	Apps	Goals	Apps	Goals	Apps	Goals
Burnley	1979–80	Second Division	15	1	1	0	0	0	16	1
Burnley	1980–81	Third Division	0	0	0	0	2	0	2	0
Burnley	1981–82	Third Division	9	0	4	0	2	0	15	0
Burnley	1982–83	Second Division	0	0	0	0	0	0	0	0
Career total			24	1	5	0	4	0	33	1
