= McLintock baronets =

Baronetcy in the Baronetage of the United Kingdom

- Escutcheon of the McLintock baronets of Sanquhar
- Creation date: 1934
- Status: extant
- Motto: Virtute et labore, By virtue and labour

The McLintock Baronetcy, of Sanquhar in the County of Dumfries, is a title in the Baronetage of the United Kingdom. It was created on 19 January 1934 for the accountant William McLintock. He was a senior partner in the firm of Thomson McLintock & Company, chartered accountants.

== McLintock baronets, of Sanquhar (1934) ==
- Sir William McLintock, 1st Baronet, GBE (1873–1947)
- Sir Thomson McLintock, 2nd Baronet (1905–1953)
- Sir William Traven McLintock, 3rd Baronet (1931–1987)
- Sir Michael William McLintock, 4th Baronet (born 1958)
