= Walter Place (footballer, born 1872) =

English footballer

Personal information
- Full name: Walter Place
- Date of birth: 1872
- Place of birth: Burnley, England
- Date of death: 11 December 1928 (aged 56)
- Position: Winger

Senior career*
Years	Team	Apps	(Gls)
1893–1900	Burnley	152	(30)
1900–1902	Woolwich Arsenal	42	(6)
	Padiham	?	(?)
- * Club domestic league appearances and goals

Walter Place (1872 – 11 December 1928) was an English professional footballer who played as a winger. His older cousin, also called Walter Place, was also a professional footballer.
