= Bill Jenkinson =

English footballer

Personal information
- Full name: William Jenkinson
- Date of birth: 11 April 1874
- Place of birth: Chesterfield, England
- Date of death: Q2 1960 (aged 85–86)
- Positions: Centre-forward; inside left

Senior career*
Years	Team	Apps	(Gls)
- Antwerp
1898–1901	Burnley	33	(11)
1901–1903	West Ham United	19	(2)
1903–1904	Burnley	17	(1)
- Colne
- * Club domestic league appearances and goals

William Jenkinson (11 April 1874 – 1960) was an English professional footballer who played in the Football League for Burnley, and in the Southern League for West Ham United.

Jenkinson featured for Antwerp before joining Burnley in 1898. There, he played mainly as a centre-forward but also featured at left-back.

He scored 11 goals in 33 appearances over two seasons for Burnley before joining West Ham United of the Southern League First Division. He made his debut in a 0–2 loss to rivals Millwall on 26 October 1901, and saw defeat in his next two appearances, against Reading and Southampton, playing different positions in each of the three games. After settling at inside-left, he was part of the team that ended the season with an unbeaten run of 11 matches.

Jenkinson returned to Burnley for the 1903–04 season, making 17 appearances and scoring once. He later played for Colne.
