= Colin Anderson (footballer) =

English footballer (born 1962)

Personal information
- Full name: Colin Anderson
- Date of birth: 26 April 1962 (age 64)
- Place of birth: Newcastle, England
- Height: 5 ft 8 in (1.73 m)
- Positions: Defender; centre midfielder

Senior career*
Years	Team	Apps	(Gls)
1980–1982	Burnley	6	(0)
1982	North Shields	?	(?)
1982–1985	Torquay United	109	(11)
1985–1991	West Bromwich Albion	140	(10)
1991–1992	Walsall	26	(2)
1992–1994	Hereford United	70	(1)
1994–1996	Exeter City	34	(1)
Total		385	(25)
- * Club domestic league appearances and goals

Colin Anderson (born 26 April 1962) is an English former professional footballer, predominantly playing on left side of defence or midfield.
