= Tom McLintock =

Scottish footballer

Personal information
- Full name: Thomas McLintock
- Place of birth: Maybole, Scotland
- Position: Full back

Senior career*
Years	Team	Apps	(Gls)
- Clyde
- Kilmarnock
1893–1902	Burnley	233	(14)
- Kilmarnock
- * Club domestic league appearances and goals

Thomas McLintock was a Scottish professional footballer who played as a full back. He played well over 200 matches in the English Football League for Burnley.
