= David Holt (footballer, born 1952) =

English footballer

Personal information
- Date of birth: 26 February 1952
- Place of birth: Padiham, England
- Date of death: 15 June 2003 (aged 51)
- Place of death: Wellington, New Zealand
- Height: 5 ft 10 in (1.78 m)
- Position: Centre half

Senior career*
Years	Team	Apps	(Gls)
1969–1974	Bury	179	(9)
1974–1980	Oldham Athletic	142	(1)
1980–1983	Burnley	84	(1)
Total		405	(11)
- * Club domestic league appearances and goals

David Holt (26 February 1952 – 15 June 2003) was an English professional footballer who played as a central defender.

He played over 400 matches in the Football League for Bury, Oldham Athletic and Burnley, before retiring in 1983 to start a plastic recycling business. In 1998, he moved to New Zealand to run a courier business. In 2003, he collapsed while on his rounds and died of a heart attack, aged 51. Holt was married to Avrille, and the couple had two sons, Paul and Shaun.

== Honours ==
Burnley

- Football League Third Division: 1981–82
