= Tommy Cassidy =

Northern Irish footballer (1950–2024)

Personal information
- Full name: Thomas Cassidy
- Date of birth: 18 November 1950
- Place of birth: Belfast, Northern Ireland
- Date of death: 1 August 2024 (aged 73)
- Position: Midfielder

Senior career*
Years	Team	Apps	(Gls)
1968–1970	Glentoran	14	(7)
1970–1980	Newcastle United	180	(22)
1980–1983	Burnley	72	(4)
1983–1985	APOEL	44	(7)
Total		299	(33)

International career
1971–1982	Northern Ireland	24	(1)

Managerial career
- 1985–1989: APOEL
- 1993–1994: Gateshead
- 1994–1997: Glentoran
- 1998–1999: Ards
- 1999–2001: Sligo Rovers
- 2001–2007: Workington
- 2007–2008: Newcastle Blue Star
- 2010–2011: Whitby Town
- 2011–2012: Blyth Spartans
- * Club domestic league appearances and goals

Thomas Cassidy (18 November 1950 – 1 August 2024) was a Northern Ireland international footballer who played as a midfielder.

During his club career he played for Ards, Glentoran, Newcastle United, Burnley and APOEL Nicosia. He earned 24 caps for the Northern Ireland national team, and was part of the team at the 1982 FIFA World Cup when Northern Ireland reached the second round.

After retirement from playing, Cassidy became a manager, taking charge of Ards, Sligo Rovers, Workington, Whitby Town and Blyth Spartans.

== Playing career ==
Cassidy was born in Belfast on 18 November 1950. As a teenage striker he made an impressive impact on the Irish League. In 1969, after just a handful of senior appearances, he scored a hat-trick in the City Cup (Northern Ireland) Final, as Glentoran saw off Bangor 7–1. Early the following season, Cassidy having found the net four times in just six appearances, Newcastle United came calling with a £15,000 bid. In October 1970 Cassidy found himself at an English First Division club after just fourteen senior outings for Glentoran.

Although Cassidy's Football League debut did not take long to arrive, he made his first appearance in a 2–0 defeat at Southampton on 7 November 1970, he had to wait three seasons to establish himself in the Newcastle first eleven. Prior to establishing himself, a rare senior outing was made in the 2–1 1973 Anglo-Italian Cup Final defeat of Fiorentina. By that time he was playing more normally as an attacking midfielder, and in his first season as a regular (1973–74) he helped Newcastle to a Texaco (British Isles) Cup Final victory over Burnley and an FA Cup Final appearance against Liverpool. The following season Cassidy was troubled by injury and made just nine League appearances, though he did play in the first leg of the Texaco Cup Final as Newcastle retained the trophy 3–1 on aggregate against Southampton. The following season Newcastle were back at Wembley for another final, losing out 2–1 in the League Cup to Manchester City.

Cassidy's Northern Ireland career had begun at the end of his first season in English football, coming on as a substitute for Eric McMordie in a 1–0 Home Nations defeat by England. The following season he made a further substitute appearance in a 1–1 European Championship Qualification match against the Soviet Union. As with his club career he had to bide his time before establishing himself in the international set-up. The real breakthrough with Northern Ireland came in 1973–74 as well, he marked his fourth cap, his first as a starter, with the only goal in a 1–0 win over Scotland. It was to be his only international goal, and the last time he was on a victorious Northern Ireland team until 1979.

Through the mid-1970s, injuries permitting, Cassidy was a regular in the Northern Ireland team, until a falling out with Danny Blanchflower saw him banished from the set-up for two years. He did however return to favour for Blanchflower's last few matches, starting in a 5–1 defeat by England at Wembley, and coming off the bench during a 1–0 victory over the Republic of Ireland at Windsor Park.

Groin, knee and ankle injuries had taken their toll on Cassidy's pace, and by the time Billy Bingham was appointed Northern Ireland manager in 1980, Cassidy was more at home as a defensive midfielder. Bingham used Cassidy in this role for each of his first nine games in charge, thus allowing the likes of McIlroy, Brotherston, Finney and O'Neill to make a suitable attacking impact. He played an important role in Northern Ireland's 1980 Home Nation Championship success, helping bring the old trophy back to Belfast for the first time in 66 years.

Cassidy's last season for Newcastle was 1979–1980, when the team topped the second division table at the start of 1980 and looked set to be promoted. Cassidy netted two notable goals at the end of the year, first scoring a 20-yard volley against Queens Park Rangers on 15 December to put the side 3–2 up (the game ended 4–2) and then registering an even better long-range effort against Sunderland on New Year's Day to seal a 3–1 home win. He later told the Evening Chronicle newspaper: "I have lived on it ever since. In truth everywhere I have gone people ask me about it. It's probably got me 40,000 pints of beer! Even when I sit on my own at times I look back and reflect on it. In my day it was the biggest game out there for Newcastle."

Newcastle though dropped away and finished the season ninth.

A £30,000 move to Burnley, freshly relegated to Division Three, in the summer of 1980, did not initially harm Cassidy's international career, but over the following few seasons it became clear that Bingham was favouring players featuring regularly at a higher level. A few moments of glory in green remained however. In November 1981 he was called up to replace Martin O'Neill for the final World Cup Qualifier against Israel, a must win game to ensure a place in Spain. Sure enough, Northern Ireland won 1–0, and Cassidy travelled with the squad to the Finals. In Spain he made a single appearance, coming off the bench for the injured Sammy McIlroy, and helping to steady ten-man Northern Ireland, during the historic 1–0 win over the hosts. Spain brought the curtain down on Cassidy's, somewhat up-and-down, international career in the most glorious of fashions.

Having helped Burnley to the Third Division title before travelling to Spain, Cassidy brought his Football League career to a close in 1983, before moving to play for APOEL in Cyprus, where he won the Cup and the Super Cup.

== Managerial career ==
Cassidy later managed APOEL, leading them to the Cypriot League Championship, but left when he blew the whistle on high-level corruption in the game. He returned to the north-east of England to manage Gateshead, and was linked with the Newcastle job in 1992 prior to the arrival of Kevin Keegan. In 1994, he returned to the Oval as manager of a demoralised Glentoran, and helped them to an early success in the Gold Cup. The rest of his time with the Glens proved difficult, with high-profile cup final failures and expensive transfer flops such as Liam Coyle being tempered only slightly by an Irish Cup Final win over Glenavon in 1996. Under pressure from the fans, Cassidy left Glentoran in December 1997.

In 1998 Cassidy was appointed manager of Ards, but was sacked in October 1999 when the board were not satisfied with their prospects of promotion from the First Division – they were second at the time.

Less than a month later Cassidy took charge of Sligo Rovers. In his first home game Sligo lost 5–3 to Shamrock Rovers and Cassidy got sent off . He could not save them from relegation from the Premier Division at the end of his first season. Sligo just missed out on promotion the following year when they lost the final match of the campaign 4–1 to Home Farm, and Cassidy left the club that summer .

He briefly scouted Irish League players for then Northern Ireland manager Sammy McIlroy, before returning to management with Northern League Division One club, Workington. He guided the Reds to promotion to the Premier League in 2004, and runners-up spot the following season saw the club promoted to the Football Conference Northern Division.

On 16 December 2011, he joined Blyth Spartans as manager, but in October 2012 he was sacked by the club.

== Personal life and death ==
In 2021, it was revealed that Cassidy was suffering from Alzheimer's disease. Cassidy died from the disease on 1 August 2024. He was 73.

== Honours ==
=== As a player ===
Glentoran

- City Cup: 1969–70

Newcastle United

- Anglo-Italian Cup: 1973
- Texaco Cup: 1973–74, 1974–75
- FA Cup runner-up: 1973–74
- Football League Cup runner-up: 1975–76

Burnley

- Football League Third Division: 1981–82

APOEL

- Cypriot Cup: 1983–84
- LTV Super Cup: 1984

=== As a manager ===
APOEL

- Cypriot First Division: 1985–86
- LTV Super Cup: 1986

Glentoran

- Irish Cup: 1995–96
- Gold Cup: 1994–95

== Sources ==
- https://web.archive.org/web/20110413080831/http://www.whitby-town.com/news10.php
- https://web.archive.org/web/20120611044429/http://blythspartansafc.co.uk/new_php/?p=7718
