= Billy Bowes =

Scottish footballer

Personal information
- Full name: William Bowes
- Place of birth: Armadale, Scotland
- Position: Inside forward

Senior career*
| Years | Team | Apps | (Gls) |
| 1890–1901 | Burnley | 269 | (79) |
- * Club domestic league appearances and goals

William Bowes was a Scottish professional footballer who played as an inside forward.
