= Brian Flynn (footballer) =

Welsh footballer (born 1955)

Personal information
- Full name: Brian Flynn
- Date of birth: 12 October 1955 (age 71)
- Place of birth: Port Talbot, Glamorgan, Wales
- Height: 1.61 m (5 ft 3 in)
- Position: Midfielder

Senior career*
Years	Team	Apps	(Gls)
1972–1977	Burnley	120	(8)
1977–1982	Leeds United	154	(11)
1982	→ Burnley (loan)	2	(0)
1982–1984	Burnley	80	(11)
1984–1985	Cardiff City	32	(0)
1985–1986	Doncaster Rovers	27	(0)
1986–1987	Bury	19	(0)
1987	Limerick City	10	(1)
1987–1988	Doncaster Rovers	24	(1)
1988–1993	Wrexham	100	(5)
Total		568	(37)

International career
1974–1984	Wales	66	(7)

Managerial career
- 1989–2001: Wrexham
- 2002–2004: Swansea City
- 2004–2012: Wales U21
- 2010: Wales (caretaker)
- 2013: Doncaster Rovers
- 2019: Wrexham (caretaker)
- * Club domestic league appearances and goals

Brian Flynn (born 12 October 1955) is a Welsh former footballer and manager. As a player, he was a Welsh international, who played as a midfielder.

Flynn managed the Wales national under-21 football team until May 2012, coming close to taking Wales to their first major championship in 57 years. On 13 September 2010, Flynn was confirmed caretaker manager of the Wales national football team after John Toshack stepped down, prior to the appointment of Gary Speed.

== Playing career ==
Flynn started his career with Burnley, and made his league debut for the club in the 1973–74 season, when it was in the old First Division. After 120 league appearances he transferred to Leeds United in November 1977. He moved back to Burnley in November 1982 (after an earlier brief loan spell) and, after 80 more league games, Flynn moved to Cardiff City in November 1984.

Later playing for Doncaster Rovers, Bury, Limerick City and Wrexham, Flynn made his final Football League appearances in the 1992–93 season with Wrexham, with his final game coming on 3 November 1992 against Scunthorpe United.

He earned 66 full Welsh caps between 1975 and 1984, scoring 7 goals.

== Management career ==
=== Wrexham ===
He became manager of Wrexham in 1989, and remained in charge until 2001. During his twelve years in charge Wrexham won the Welsh Cup three times gaining entry to the Cup Winners Cup. They achieved notable FA Cup giant-killing victories over reigning league champions Arsenal and Premier League West Ham United. Flynn also led Wrexham to promotion into the second division. At the time of his departure from Wrexham he was the league's third longest serving manager behind Alex Ferguson and Dario Gradi.

=== Swansea City ===
He was appointed as Swansea City manager in September 2002, replacing Nick Cusack.

Cusack's last game in charge on 18 September 2002 had seen Swansea lose 1–0 away to Boston United and move to last place in the Football League for the first time in their history. Flynn's first game on 21 September 2002 was no better for Swansea with them losing 1–0 at home to Torquay United. He set about trying to rebuild the side giving debuts to 21 players in his first season Their Football League status was only maintained on the last day of the season with them winning 4–2 at home to Hull City. The following season started well for Swansea and they made the FA Cup 5th round but after a loss of form, Flynn was replaced by Kenny Jackett.

=== Wales ===
Flynn joined the Welsh national set-up in 2004 as under-21 coach. His management of the Welsh under-21 side has seen some of the best results in its history. Flynn came agonisingly close to taking the Welsh team to the 2009 UEFA under-21 Championships, guiding the side to the top of a group containing France and Romania, including a superb away win against the latter. Unfortunately, competition rules stipulated that even group winners had to go through a two-legged play-off round in order to qualify, and Wales were knocked out 5–4 on aggregate against their neighbours, England.

Following the departure of John Toshack as Wales manager in September 2010, Flynn was appointed as Wales caretaker manager. He took charge of two games, both defeats. On 8 October 2010 Wales were beaten 1–0 in Cardiff by Bulgaria and on 12 October 2010 they lost 4–1 to Switzerland at St. Jakob-Park in Basel.

Flynn vacated his position with Wales Under 21s in May 2012 at the end of his contract. He was credited with an important role in the development of Gareth Bale, Aaron Ramsey, Joe Allen and Wayne Hennessey.

=== Doncaster Rovers ===
Having already been working for Doncaster Rovers as a scout, he was appointed as caretaker manager of the club on 7 January following Dean Saunders move to Wolverhampton Wanderers. At that point he was assisted by player Rob Jones who had been briefly installed as caretaker earlier that morning. On 17 January Flynn was confirmed as permanent manager with a contract till the end of the season. His first game in permanent charge of Doncaster on 19 January 2013 saw his side win 2–0 against Leyton Orient.

On 27 April 2013, Flynn secured promotion with Doncaster, and the League One title, with a 1–0 win against Brentford at Griffin Park. Victory for Brentford would have seen them promoted at Doncaster's expense, and they were awarded a penalty-kick in injury-time, but missed and Doncaster scored from the resulting counterattack to earn the victory.

At the end of the season, Flynn expressed a desire to step down as manager and return to a role of developing and recruiting players. Doncaster offered him a senior role in this as well as helping to choose the new manager. For the 2013–14 season he was named as Director of Football including overseeing the newly formed development squad which would be playing competitive games.

=== Return to Wrexham ===
On 21 February 2019, Flynn returned to Wrexham as assistant manager to recently appointed manager Bryan Hughes, who started his playing career at Wrexham under Flynn.

== Scouting career ==
On 1 December 2016 Flynn returned to Swansea City as a scout. After Swansea's relegation to the Championship at the end of the 2017–18 season, Flynn and the rest of the scouting team were relieved of their duties.

== Managerial statistics ==
As of 5 October 2019

Managerial record by team and tenure
Team	From	To	Record				
Team	From	To	P	W	D	L	Win %
Wrexham	24 November 1989	24 September 2001	622	223	173	226	35.9
Swansea City	19 September 2002	18 March 2004	82	28	22	32	34.1
Wales U21	18 March 2004	31 May 2012	37	19	5	13	51.4
Wales	19 September 2010	14 December 2010	2	0	0	2	0.0
Doncaster Rovers	17 January 2013	3 May 2013	20	10	4	6	50.0
Wrexham (Caretaker)	25 September 2019	6 October 2019	3	1	1	1	33.3
Total			766	281	205	280	36.7

== Honours ==
=== As a manager ===
Doncaster Rovers

- Football League One: 2012–13
