= Brian Laws =

English footballer and manager

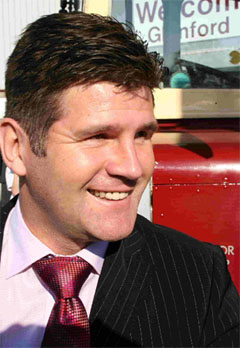
- Laws in 2006

Personal information
- Full name: Brian Laws
- Date of birth: 14 October 1961 (age 65)
- Place of birth: Wallsend, England
- Height: 5 ft 10 in (1.78 m)
- Position: Defender

Senior career*
Years	Team	Apps	(Gls)
1979–1983	Burnley	125	(12)
1983–1985	Huddersfield Town	56	(1)
1985–1988	Middlesbrough	108	(12)
1988–1994	Nottingham Forest	147	(4)
1994–1996	Grimsby Town	46	(2)
1996–1997	Darlington	10	(0)
1997–1998	Scunthorpe United	18	(0)
Total		510	(31)

Managerial career
- 1994–1996: Grimsby Town
- 1997–2004: Scunthorpe United
- 2004–2006: Scunthorpe United
- 2006–2009: Sheffield Wednesday
- 2010: Burnley
- 2012: Shamrock Rovers
- 2012–2013: Scunthorpe United
- * Club domestic league appearances and goals

Brian Laws (born 14 October 1961) is an English former professional footballer and manager.

Playing as a defender, Laws made over 100 appearances for each of Burnley, Middlesbrough, and Nottingham Forest. In 1994, Laws became player-manager of Grimsby Town before taking a similar position with Scunthorpe United in 1997. For the next nine years, Laws served as manager of Scunthorpe United, guiding them to promotion twice. In 2006, he accepted the managerial role at Sheffield Wednesday, lasting three years in the job during which time Burnley approached him for their managers job when Steve Cotterill left, but were put off by the compensation demanded by Wednesday. Wednesday later struggled with financial problems and he was dismissed in December 2009 after a poor run of results.

After only a brief spell out of the game, Burnley appointed Laws as their manager, giving him his first chance to manage in the Premier League after Owen Coyle left the club for Bolton Wanderers in January 2010 and took the entire management team with him. He was dismissed by the club in December that year. Laws returned to manage Scunthorpe United in 2012 only to be dismissed in November 2013.

== Playing career ==
Born in Wallsend, Northumberland, Laws began playing football at the famous Wallsend Boys Club. Aged 17 he signed his first professional contract with Burnley, joining the club as an apprentice. Over the following four seasons he made 181 appearances for the club and, despite his defensive role, scored fifteen goals. However, during this period the club's fortunes were in decline and, following relegation back to the old Third Division, Burnley sold Laws across the Pennines to Huddersfield Town for only £10,000 in 1983. Two years later Laws was sold again, moving to Middlesbrough for £30,000. After a short period Laws became first choice in Middlesbrough's starting eleven, in his three seasons at the club he twice helped the team to promotion, firstly to the Second Division and then, just a year later, up to the old First Division.

On 14 July 1986, he famously applied to the Football League to have his contract cancelled and enable himself to leave Middlesbrough on a free transfer, as they were in liquidation and on the verge of losing their Football League status and going out of business at this stage. However, they were saved from closure the following month and Laws remained part of the team who won promotion in the next two seasons to take them from the Third Division to the First. However, the club's finances were not strong, and when Nottingham Forest offered £120,000 for his contract in 1988 Middlesbrough sold him to the Trentside club.

Laws was part of Brian Clough's successful Nottingham Forest team for six seasons, playing mainly as right full-back. He is sometimes credited as Forest's second-best right-back of all time behind regular England international Viv Anderson. During this time he won the League Cup twice and was runner up in the League Cup and FA Cup. Clough's first words to his new signing were "I've never seen you play, son, I'm going on the recommendation of Ron Fenton. So if you're crap, Ronnie signed you. If you're good, I signed you."

Laws was at Forest at the time of the Hillsborough disaster in the 1988–89 FA Cup semi final. The originally scheduled fixture had to be abandoned early in the game due to fans being fatally crushed in the Leppings Lane terracing. In the rescheduled fixture, Laws scored an own goal; the game ended 3–1 to Liverpool. He played in the 1991 FA Cup final; a 2–1 defeat to Spurs.

Forest were relegated from the Premier League at the end of the 1992–93 season and Clough retired, a year and a half later and with reduced first team opportunities, Laws left on a free transfer to become player-manager at Grimsby Town.

== Managerial career ==
Laws started his management career at Grimsby Town in 1994, replacing Alan Buckley who had moved to West Bromwich Albion. Laws' management of Town was initially successful, but deteriorated after he clashed with Grimsby Town player Ivano Bonetti. Laws reportedly threw a plate of chicken wings at the Italian following a 3–2 defeat at Luton Town in February 1996. Laws was dismissed by Grimsby Town after a poor start to the 96–97 season. He then had a short spell as a player with Darlington before taking charge of Scunthorpe United.

At Scunthorpe United Laws achieved promotion twice, in 1999 and 2005 respectively. He was dismissed by the club in March 2004 but was reinstated three weeks later, leading them to promotion the following season.

After nearly 10 years at Scunthorpe United Laws left the club in November 2006 to take over the manager's job at Sheffield Wednesday. Ex-Wednesday chairman Dave Allen, in an interview made before hiring Laws, admitted that he liked him because of his Brian Clough management style. He said "I like him, he comes from the Clough camp, I'm a great admirer of the Clough camp".

On 7 February 2009, Laws became the first Sheffield Wednesday manager for 95 years to do the league double over their neighbours Sheffield United, therefore making sure his name goes down in Wednesday history. Laws however came under increasing pressure from Wednesday fans to depart at the start of December, after a poor run of results which saw the Owls drop to 20th along with four straight home defeats. Laws left Sheffield Wednesday on 13 December 2009 by mutual consent after a run of bad results. Sheffield Wednesday were relegated in 2010 after failing to win in their last game against Crystal Palace.

In January 2010, Laws was linked with a surprise return to his first club Burnley as manager, this following the departure of Owen Coyle to Bolton Wanderers. On 13 January, Laws was appointed as the new manager of Burnley. They lost 15 of their remaining 18 Premier League games, plummeting from mid table in January to the relegation zone; their relegation being confirmed with two matches remaining. Despite this setback, the Burnley board of directors agreed that Laws would be in charge of the team for the quest to regain top flight status in 2010–11.

In summer 2010 he let a number of older players go and sold Steven Fletcher to Wolverhampton Wanderers. In pre-season he has had a successful start winning all games, bar one draw. Laws made a number of signings during the summer transfer window, including Chris Iwelumo from Wolverhampton Wanderers and Ross Wallace from local rivals Preston North End. Laws managed his 700th league game in a 4–0 win over Hull City. However, after a poor run of results that left Burnley 9th in the Championship, after the 2–0 loss to Scunthorpe United which saw Burnley fans calling for his dismissal, on 29 December 2010 it was announced that Laws had been dismissed from the club.

On 17 September 2012, Laws was appointed Director of Football at Shamrock Rovers until the end of the 2012 League of Ireland season.

On 29 October 2012, Laws returned as manager of League One Scunthorpe United, following the dismissal of Alan Knill. In November 2013 he was dismissed by Scunthorpe following the side's FA Cup defeat by local rivals Grimsby Town.

He currently provides analysis and co-commentary on Nottingham Forest matches for BBC Radio Nottingham and Sheffield Wednesday matches on BBC Radio Sheffield.

== Personal life ==
Laws has two children from his late first wife and a son called Thomas with his second wife, Jane.

in November 2016, Laws revealed to Sheffield Live TV that he underwent double heart bypass surgery.

== Managerial statistics ==
As of 20 November 2013

Managerial record by team and tenure
Team	From	To	Record				
Team	From	To	P	W	D	L	Win %
Grimsby Town	29 November 1994	1 November 1996	99	30	28	41	30.3
Scunthorpe United	24 February 1997	25 March 2004	389	147	101	141	37.8
Scunthorpe United	14 April 2004	6 November 2006	131	55	37	39	42.0
Sheffield Wednesday	6 November 2006	13 December 2009	154	52	42	60	33.8
Burnley	13 January 2010	29 December 2010	44	13	9	22	29.5
Shamrock Rovers	17 September 2012	26 October 2012	6	4	0	2	66.7
Scunthorpe United	29 October 2012	20 November 2013	52	17	14	21	32.7
Total			875	318	231	326	36.3

== Honours ==
=== As a player ===
Burnley

- Football League Third Division: 1981–82

Nottingham Forest

- Football League Cup: 1988–89, 1989–90; runner-up: 1991–92
- Full Members' Cup: 1988–89
- FA Cup runner-up: 1990–91

Individual

- PFA Team of the Year: 1986–87 Third Division

=== As a manager ===
Scunthorpe United

- Football League Third Division play-offs: 1999

Individual

- Football League Two Manager of the Month: April 2005
- Football League One Manager of the Month: September 2006
