= Billy O'Rourke =

English footballer

Personal information
- Full name: William James O'Rourke
- Date of birth: 2 April 1960
- Place of birth: Nottingham, England
- Date of death: 28 January 2002 (aged 41)
- Position: Goalkeeper

Youth career
- 1976–1978: Burnley

Senior career*
Years	Team	Apps	(Gls)
1978–1984	Burnley	14	(0)
1983	→ Blackpool (loan)	6	(0)
1984	Chester City	5	(0)
1984–1987	Blackpool	92	(0)
1986	→ Tranmere Rovers (loan)	15	(0)
1987–1988	Tranmere Rovers	38	(0)
Total		170	(0)
- * Club domestic league appearances and goals

William James O'Rourke (2 April 1960 – 28 January 2002) was an English professional footballer who played as a goalkeeper. He played in The Football League for four clubs.

== Playing career ==
O'Rourke began his career as an apprentice with Burnley, with whom he turned professional in February 1978. His debut came at QPR in October 1979, in a match shown on Match of the Day. Burnley lost 7–0, with O'Rourke leaving the pitch in tears; however, his performance led to the Burnley Express naming him as his side's man of the match.

He went on to make 13 more league appearances for the Clarets before joining Blackpool on loan in August 1983, followed by a move to Chester City in March 1984. Just five appearances later he was back at Blackpool, this time on a permanent basis, playing every league game in the next two seasons. He was voted Player of the Year in his first full season.

In September 1986, O'Rourke joined Tranmere Rovers on loan, making a permanent switch to Prenton Park the following February. He remained with the club the following season, before leaving Football League circles. He then joined ICI Thornton.

== Honours ==
Blackpool

- Football League Fourth Division runners-up: 1984–85

== Death ==
O'Rourke died following a brain haemorrhage on 28 January 2002.
