= Phil Cavener =

English footballer

Personal information
- Full name: Philip Cavener
- Date of birth: 2 June 1961 (age 65)
- Place of birth: Tynemouth, England
- Position: Winger

Youth career
- Wallsend Boys Club

Senior career*
Years	Team	Apps	(Gls)
1979–1983	Burnley	69	(4)
1983	→ Bradford City (loan)	9	(2)
1983–1984	Gillingham	10	(1)
1984	Karlskrona	1	(0)
1984–1986	Northampton Town	45	(11)
1986	Peterborough United	10	(0)
1986–1987	Kettering Town	26	(4)
Total		169	(22)
- * Club domestic league appearances and goals

Philip Cavener (born 2 June 1961) is an English former professional footballer who played as a winger. He played in the Football League for Burnley, Bradford City, Gillingham, Northampton Town and Peterborough United, in Sweden for Karlskrona, and in the National League for Kettering Town.
