= Andy Wharton =

English footballer (1961–2025)

Personal information
- Full name: Andrew Wharton
- Date of birth: 21 December 1961
- Place of birth: Bacup, Lancashire, England
- Date of death: April 2025 (aged 63)
- Position: Defender

Senior career*
Years	Team	Apps	(Gls)
1979–1984	Burnley	65	(6)
1983–1984	→ Torquay United (loan)	10	(0)
1984–1985	Chester City	23	(2)
Total		98	(8)
- * Club domestic league appearances and goals

Andrew Wharton (21 December 1961 – April 2025) was an English professional footballer who played as a defender. He died in April 2025, at the age of 63.

== Honours ==
Burnley

- Football League Third Division: 1981–82

== Sources ==
- Hugman, Barry (2005). The PFA Premier and Football League Players' Records 1946-2005. Queen Anne Press.
