= Derek Scott (footballer) =

English footballer

Personal information
- Full name: Derek Edward Scott
- Date of birth: 8 February 1958 (age 68)
- Place of birth: Gateshead, County Durham, England
- Height: 5 ft 8 in (1.73 m)
- Position: Defender

Senior career*
Years	Team	Apps	(Gls)
1974–1985	Burnley	285	(24)
1985–1988	Bolton Wanderers	119	(0)
1988–1989	Colne Dynamoes		

International career
1973	England Schoolboys	8	(0)
- * Club domestic league appearances and goals

Derek Edward Scott (born 8 February 1958) is an English former professional footballer who made more than 400 appearances in the Football League playing as a right-sided full-back for Burnley and Bolton Wanderers.

== Honours ==
Burnley

- Football League Third Division: 1981–82

Bolton Wanderers

- Associate Members' Cup runner-up: 1985–86
