= Mike Phelan =

English football player and coach (born 1962)

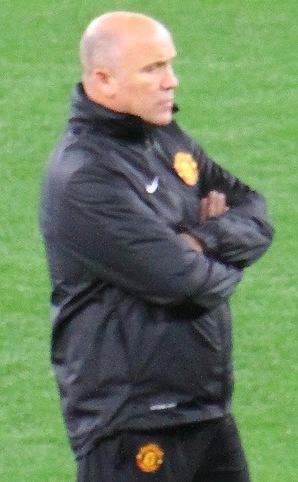
- Phelan with Manchester United in 2012

Personal information
- Full name: Michael Christopher Phelan
- Date of birth: 24 September 1962 (age 64)
- Place of birth: Nelson, Lancashire, England
- Height: 5 ft 11 in (1.80 m)
- Positions: Defender; midfielder

Youth career
- Burnley

Senior career*
Years	Team	Apps	(Gls)
1979–1985	Burnley	168	(9)
1985–1989	Norwich City	156	(9)
1989–1994	Manchester United	102	(2)
1994–1995	West Bromwich Albion	21	(0)
Total		485	(20)

International career
1981	England U18	5	(0)
1989	England	1	(0)

Managerial career
- 2015: Norwich City (caretaker)
- 2016–2017: Hull City
- * Club domestic league appearances and goals

Michael Christopher Phelan (born 24 September 1962) is an English professional football coach and former player who was most recently assistant head coach for EFL Championship club Plymouth Argyle.

Born in Nelson, Lancashire, he spent most of his playing career at Burnley, Norwich City and Manchester United, with a short spell at West Bromwich Albion before retirement. While he was with Manchester United he also earned a single cap for England. In 2006, Norwich fans voted Phelan into the club's Hall of Fame.

Following the end of his playing career, Phelan moved into management. He first took a position as Gary Megson's assistant at his former club, Norwich City, before following Megson to Blackpool and then Stockport County. After Megson left Stockport, Phelan was hired by another former club, Manchester United, taking over as the assistant manager of the club's reserve team. Two years later, he was promoted to become Alex Ferguson's chief first-team coach, and in 2008 he replaced Carlos Queiroz as Ferguson's assistant manager. He remained in the position until Ferguson's retirement in 2013, when Ferguson's successor David Moyes replaced the entire coaching staff.

After a year out of football, Phelan was appointed as first-team coach back at Norwich City in November 2014 and took temporary charge of the club when manager Neil Adams resigned in January 2015, only to be relieved of his duties by Adams' permanent replacement, Alex Neil. A month later, he was appointed as assistant manager at Hull City under former Manchester United teammate Steve Bruce. He was promoted to first team management following the departure of Bruce on a temporary basis before the 2016–17 season. This was made permanent on 13 October. He was sacked from his position with Hull on 3 January 2017 with the club 20th in the Premier League.

== Playing career ==
Phelan began his career at Burnley, signing as an associated schoolboy in July 1979, as an apprentice two years later and as a professional in July 1980. He made his league debut in January 1981 against Chesterfield and whilst at Turf Moor, gained England Youth caps and a Third Division champions medal in 1982. But in 1985, Burnley were relegated to the Fourth Division, and Phelan moved to Norwich City for £60,000 on 13 July 1985. Norwich won the Second Division title in his first season at the club. He became club captain when Steve Bruce joined Manchester United in December 1987, captaining them to fourth place in the First Division and a place in the FA Cup semi-finals in his first full season as captain.

He was called into the England squad for the Rous Cup games against Chile and Scotland but did not play due to a hamstring injury. His success drew the attention of larger clubs and he followed Steve Bruce to Manchester United for £750,000 on 1 July 1989. While at United, he won his first international cap (against Italy in 1989) and an FA Cup winner's medal in his first season. This was followed by the FA Charity Shield in 1990, European Cup Winners' Cup in 1991 and the League Cup in 1992. Phelan was often deployed at right-back during his first season at Manchester United, but following the arrival of Denis Irwin in 1990 he mostly played on the right or in the centre of midfield. He had played on the right side of midfield before Irwin's arrival, most notably in the FA Cup final win over Crystal Palace in 1990, when Paul Ince was switched from central midfield to right-back.

By 1993, however, his appearances were becoming increasingly limited due to growing competition from younger players like Andrei Kanchelskis, Paul Ince, Ryan Giggs and Lee Sharpe. He did make enough league appearances to collect a Premier League title medal for the 1992–93 season, but rarely played in the 1993–94 season, failing to make enough appearances for another league title medal, and not being in the squad for the FA Cup triumph over Chelsea.

With the introduction of Premier League squad numbers for the 1993–94 season, he was issued with the number 23 shirt which was next worn by Phil Neville. Phelan was given a free transfer at the end of the 1993–94 season. After leaving Old Trafford, Phelan signed for West Bromwich Albion, where he spent 18 months and played just 21 games, his first-team chances limited by younger players such as Kevin Donovan and Lee Ashcroft, who were more favoured by new manager Alan Buckley (appointed in the autumn following the dismissal of Keith Burkinshaw, who brought Phelan to the club).

== Coaching career ==
He returned to Carrow Road in December 1995, as an assistant manager to Gary Megson (another former Norwich player) and managed the club's reserve team. When Megson was fired and joined Blackpool, Phelan followed him to take a similar role, returning to his native North-West. A year later, he followed Megson to Stockport County.

Following Megson's sacking as Stockport County boss on 25 June 1999, Andy Kilner took over as manager. Phelan moved on shortly afterwards, taking up a role at Manchester United's Centre of Excellence. Following Steve McClaren's departure to Middlesbrough in the summer of 2001, Phelan was promoted to first-team coach. He was appointed assistant manager of United on 3 September 2008, replacing Carlos Queiroz who had left to manage the Portugal national football team. For many years, Phelan conducted interviews for BBC programmes such as Match of the Day, due to United manager Alex Ferguson refusing to speak with the BBC following corruption allegations made in 2004 by the BBC's Panorama programme towards one of Ferguson's sons, football agent Jason Ferguson. Ferguson finally agreed to BBC interviews once more in August 2011. In January 2010, Phelan was linked with a return to his first club Burnley as manager following the departure of Owen Coyle to Bolton Wanderers. He was Ferguson's right-hand man for three Premier League titles, a FIFA Club World Cup, two League Cups, and two runs to the final of the UEFA Champions League. He departed the club shortly after Ferguson's retirement.

On 20 November 2014, Phelan was announced as a first-team coach at Norwich City. Following the resignation of Neil Adams on 5 January 2015, Phelan was named caretaker manager of Norwich. On 9 January, Norwich appointed Hamilton Academical manager Alex Neil, and Phelan returned to his first-team coaching duties. On 20 January, Phelan left the club by mutual consent. On 5 February, Phelan was named assistant manager at Hull City. On 22 July 2016, following the resignation of Steve Bruce, the club confirmed that Phelan would act as caretaker manager. He was named Premier League Manager of the Month for August, after victories over Leicester City and Swansea City, and a narrow defeat to Manchester United. On 13 October, Phelan was appointed first-team manager on a permanent basis. On 3 January 2017, Hull City's vice-chairman Ehab Allam released a statement stating that the club and Phelan had parted company for a "fresh approach".

On 16 July 2018, Phelan was appointed sporting director at Central Coast Mariners; a mostly ambassadorial position. Less than six months later on 19 December, Phelan was appointed as a first-team coach for Manchester United's caretaker manager, Ole Gunnar Solskjær. On 10 May, he was appointed as United's assistant manager for the second time.

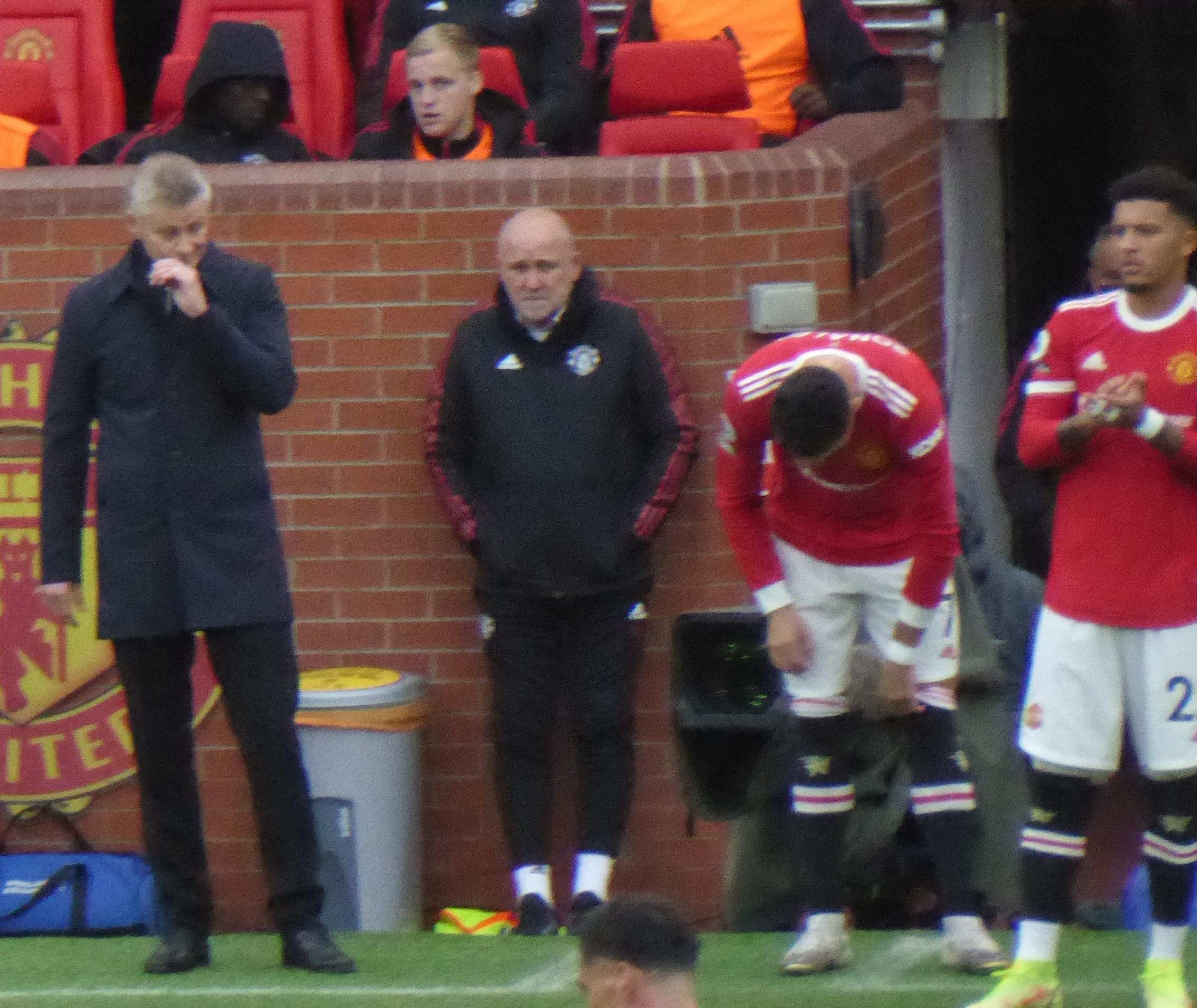
Phelan (centre) as assistant manager with Ole Gunnar Solskjær (left) in October 2021

In December 2021, following Solskjær's departure as Manchester United manager, his interim replacement Ralf Rangnick confirmed that Phelan would remain as one of the club's first-team coaches, though he was not involved in training sessions.

On 8 December 2024, Phelan moved to be assistant head coach at Plymouth Argyle only to leave on 31 December 2024, following the departure of manager Wayne Rooney.

Phelan also runs Mike Phelan Coaching, which provides football development for football clubs and grassroots organisations and aspiring coaches.

== Managerial statistics ==
As of 3 January 2017

Managerial record by team and tenure
Team	From	To	Record					Ref
Team	From	To	P	W	D	L	Win %	Ref
Norwich City (caretaker)	5 January 2015	9 January 2015	0	0	0	0	—	
Hull City	22 July 2016	3 January 2017	24	6	5	13	25.0	
Total			24	6	5	13	25.0	—

== Honours ==
=== Player ===
Burnley

- Football League Third Division: 1981–82

Norwich City

- Football League Second Division: 1985–86

Manchester United

- Premier League: 1992–93
- FA Cup: 1989–90
- Football League Cup: 1991–92; runner-up: 1990–91
- FA Charity Shield: 1990 (shared)
- European Cup Winners Cup: 1990–91

=== Manager ===
Individual

- Premier League Manager of the Month: August 2016
