= Billy Hamilton (footballer) =

Northern Irish footballer (born 1957)

Personal information
- Full name: William Robert Hamilton
- Date of birth: 9 May 1957 (age 69)
- Place of birth: Gilnahirk, County Down, Northern Ireland
- Height: 6 ft 1 in (1.85 m)
- Position: Forward

Senior career*
| Years | Team | Apps | (Gls) |
| 1975–1978 | Linfield | 66 | (25) |
| 1978–1979 | Queens Park Rangers | 12 | (2) |
| 1979–1984 | Burnley | 200 | (58) |
| 1984–1987 | Oxford United | 92 | (25) |
| 1987–1989 | Limerick City | 29 | (4) |
| 1989 | Coleraine | 1 | (0) |
| 1989 | Sligo Rovers | 18 | (4) |
| 1989–1992 | Distillery | 50 | (28) |
| Total | | 468 | (146) |

International career
| 1979–1986 | Northern Ireland | 41 | (5) |

Managerial career
- 1987–1989: Limerick
- 1989–1995: Distillery
- * Club domestic league appearances and goals

William Robert Hamilton (born 9 May 1957) is a former Northern Ireland international footballer who played as a forward.

== Club career ==
At club level, Hamilton played for Linfield, QPR, Burnley, Oxford United, Limerick, Sligo Rovers, Coleraine and Distillery.

Hamilton moved to the League of Ireland in January 1987, joining Limerick City as player-manager. At the time, the club were competing in the league's Premier Division. Hamilton managed the side to consecutive ninth-place finishes in the top tier before Limerick finished third in the 1988–89 season, with Hamilton scoring 21 league goals and finishing as the league's top scorer. He also won the Munster Senior Cup with Limerick in 1988. Hamilton resigned his position as player-manager in September 1989.

He joined Distillery as Player/Manager in December 1989. He made his playing debut for the Whites on 22 March 1990 and in his three seasons made 72 appearances and scored 33 goals including one hat-trick.

== International career ==
Hamilton is best remembered by Northern Ireland fans as the man who crossed the ball for Gerry Armstrong to score for Northern Ireland in their famous win against the hosts Spain at the 1982 FIFA World Cup. He played in every game and scored two goals in the second-round game against Austria, and also played at the 1986 World Cup. He also twice won the Home Internationals in 1980 and 1984, scoring the winner against Scotland in the 1980 competition. Northern Ireland never lost when Hamilton scored. In total, Hamilton played 41 games for his country, scoring five goals.

== Management and coaching ==
Knee injuries forced Hamilton to end his playing career in February 1992, but he continued to manage Distillery until February 1995. He guided the club to the Gold Cup victory in the 1993/94 season.

== Personal life ==
After retiring to Bangor, County Down, Hamilton opened a sports trophy business.

Hamilton designed a board game, Billy Hamilton's Football Academy, which was released in 1985. He is married to Isabella.

== International goals ==
Scores and results list Northern Ireland's goal tally first

| Goal | Date | Venue | Opponent | Score | Result | Competition |
|---|---|---|---|---|---|---|
| 1 | 16 May 1980 | Belfast, Northern Ireland | Scotland | 1–0 | 1–0 | 1980 Home Internationals |
| 2 | 25 March 1981 | Glasgow, Scotland | Scotland | 1–1 | 1–1 | 1982 FIFA World Cup qualification |
| 3 | 1 July 1982 | Madrid, Spain | Austria | 1–0 | 2–2 | 1982 FIFA World Cup |
| 4 | 1 July 1982 | Madrid, Spain | Austria | 2–2 | 2–2 | 1982 FIFA World Cup |
| 5 | 21 September 1983 | Belfast, Northern Ireland | Austria | 1–0 | 3–1 | UEFA Euro 1984 qualification |

== Honours ==
Burnley

- Football League Third Division: 1981–82
