= 1977–78 Burnley F.C. season =

English football club season

Burnley
1977–78 season
- Chairman: Bob Lord
- Manager: Harry Potts
- Division Two: 11th
- League Cup: 3rd Round
- FA Cup: 4th Round
- Anglo-Scottish Cup: Preliminary Group
- Top goalscorer: League: Steve Kindon (12); All: Steve Kindon (13)
- Highest home attendance: 27,427 v Blackburn Rovers (26 December 1977)
- Lowest home attendance: 4,792 v Chester (13 August 1977)
- Average home league attendance: 11,581

The 1977–78 season was Burnley's second consecutive season in the second tier of English football. They were managed by Harry Potts.

== Appearances and goals ==
No.	Pos	Nat	Player	Total		Division Two		League Cup		FA Cup		AS Cup	
No.	Pos	Nat	Player	Apps	Goals	Apps	Goals	Apps	Goals	Apps	Goals	Apps	Goals
	DF	(England) ENG	Ian Brennan	49	4	40+0	4	4+0	0	2+0	0	3+0	0
	MF	(Scotland) SCO	Marshall Burke	9	1	6+1	1	1+1	0	0+0	0	0+0	0
	MF	(Northern Ireland) NIR	Terry Cochrane	49	10	36+4	8	4+0	2	2+0	0	3+0	0
	FW	(England) ENG	Paul Fletcher	40	10	34+0	7	3+0	1	2+0	2	1+0	0
	MF	(Wales) WAL	Brian Flynn	19	2	12+0	2	4+0	0	0+0	0	3+0	0
	MF	(Scotland) SCO	Brian Hall	10	1	9+1	1	0+0	0	0+0	0	0+0	0
	DF	(England) ENG	Bob Higgins	3	0	3+0	0	0+0	0	0+0	0	0+0	0
	MF	(England) ENG	Billy Ingham	41	6	32+1	4	3+0	1	2+0	0	3+0	1
	FW	(England) ENG	Steve Kindon	29	13	27+0	12	0+0	0	2+0	1	0+0	0
	FW	(England) ENG	David Loggie	4	0	2+0	0	0+0	0	0+0	0	2+0	0
	MF	(England) ENG	Tony Morley	33	2	27+2	1	2+0	1	1+1	0	0+0	0
	DF	(England) ENG	Keith Newton	25	0	18+0	0	3+0	0	1+0	0	3+0	0
	MF	(England) ENG	Peter Noble	49	9	40+0	8	4+0	1	2+0	0	3+0	0
	DF	(England) ENG	Richard Overson	1	0	1+0	0	0+0	0	0+0	0	0+0	0
	DF	(England) ENG	Terry Pashley	7	0	5+1	0	0+0	0	0+0	0	0+1	0
	DF	(England) ENG	Peter Robinson	24	1	17+1	1	3+0	0	0+0	0	3+0	0
	DF	(England) ENG	Billy Rodaway	42	0	33+0	0	4+0	0	2+0	0	3+0	0
	DF	(England) ENG	Derek Scott	29	1	26+0	1	1+0	0	2+0	0	0+0	0
	FW	(Scotland) SCO	Malcolm Smith	31	5	21+3	4	3+0	0	0+1	0	3+0	1
	GK	(England) ENG	Alan Stevenson	51	0	42+0	0	4+0	0	2+0	0	3+0	0
	DF	(Scotland) SCO	Jim Thomson	34	0	31+0	0	1+0	0	2+0	0	0+0	0

== Matches ==
=== Football League Division Two ===
Key

- In Result column, Burnley's score shown first
- H = Home match
- A = Away match
- pen. = Penalty kick
- o.g. = Own goal

Results

Date	Opponents	Result	Goalscorers	Attendance
20 August 1977	Bolton Wanderers (H)	0–1		14,732
23 August 1977	Sunderland (A)	0–3		31,450
27 August 1977	Stoke City (A)	1–2	Burke 82'	12,835
3 September 1977	Crystal Palace (H)	1–1	Nicholas 15' (o.g.)	10,460
10 September 1977	Southampton (A)	0–3		17,412
17 September 1977	Brighton & Hove Albion (H)	0–0		9,227
24 September 1977	Mansfield Town (A)	1–4	Brennan 25'	8,274
1 October 1977	Millwall (H)	0–2		7,242
4 October 1977	Fulham (A)	1–4	Flynn 88'	6,895
8 October 1977	Bristol Rovers (H)	3–1	Smith 35', Cochrane 75', Robinson 79'	7,253
15 October 1977	Sheffield United (A)	1–2	Noble 75'	14,151
22 October 1977	Hull City (H)	1–1	Flynn 38'	8,592
29 October 1977	Blackpool (H)	0–1		11,243
5 November 1977	Tottenham Hotspur (A)	0–3		30,634
12 November 1977	Notts County (H)	3–1	Fletcher (2) 16', 80', Kindon 27'	9,734
19 November 1977	Cardiff City (A)	1–2	Fletcher 26'	7,069
26 November 1977	Orient (H)	0–0		8,525
3 December 1977	Luton Town (A)	2–1	Hall 29', Kindon 50'	6,921
10 December 1977	Charlton Athletic (H)	1–0	Kindon 17'	9,478
17 December 1977	Notts County (A)	0–3		7,639
26 December 1977	Blackburn Rovers (H)	2–3	Morley 64', Noble 89' (pen.)	27,427
27 December 1977	Oldham Athletic (A)	0–2		15,172
31 December 1977	Sunderland (H)	0–0		12,726
2 January 1978	Bolton Wanderers (A)	2–1	Brennan (2) 11', 47'	28,232
14 January 1978	Stoke City (H)	1–0	Kindon 70'	11,101
21 January 1978	Crystal Palace (A)	1–1	Noble 24'	15,367
4 February 1978	Southampton (H)	3–3	Kindon (2) 5', 56', Cochrane 29'	10,592
11 February 1978	Brighton & Hove Albion (A)	1–2	Scott 50'	22,694
25 February 1978	Millwall (A)	1–1	Noble 64' (pen.)	7,166
4 March 1978	Bristol Rovers (A)	2–2	Kindon (2) 37', 83'	7,520
11 March 1978	Sheffield United (H)	4–1	Cochrane (2) 55', 89', Noble 71' (pen.), Ingham 85'	11,801
14 March 1978	Mansfield Town (H)	2–0	Fletcher 43', Kindon 48'	9,893
18 March 1978	Hull City (A)	3–1	Fletcher 27', Ingham 70', Noble 78' (pen.)	5,936
25 March 1978	Oldham Athletic (H)	4–1	Cochrane (2) 32', 71', Kindon 56', Brennan 82'	13,529
27 March 1978	Blackburn Rovers (A)	1–0	Cochrane 20'	24,379
28 March 1978	Blackpool (A)	1–1	Smith 5'	13,393
1 April 1978	Tottenham Hotspur (H)	2–1	Ingham 27', Noble 52'	16,916
15 April 1978	Cardiff City (H)	4–2	Ingham 19', Kindon (2) 37', 62', Fletcher 82'	11,610
18 April 1978	Orient (A)	0–3		5,795
22 April 1978	Charlton Athletic (A)	2–3	Cochrane 1', Smith 60'	6,511
25 April 1978	Fulham (H)	2–0	Fletcher 61', Noble 70'	9,465
29 April 1978	Luton Town (H)	2–1	P. Futcher 37' (o.g.), Smith 54'	11,648

=== Final league position ===
Pos	Team	Pld	W	D	L	GF	GA	GD	Pts
9	Crystal Palace	42	13	15	14	50	47	+3	41
10	Fulham	42	14	13	15	49	49	0	41
11	Burnley	42	15	10	17	56	64	−8	40
12	Sheffield United	42	16	8	18	62	73	−11	40
13	Luton Town	42	14	10	18	54	52	+2	38

Rules for classification: 1) Points; 2) Goal difference; 3) Goals scored

=== FA Cup ===
Date	Round	Opponents	Result	Goalscorers	Attendance
7 January 1978	Round 3	Fulham (H)	1–0	Fletcher 86'	10,984
21 January 1978	Round 4	Chelsea (A)	2–6	Fletcher 1', Kindon 79'	32,168

=== League Cup ===
Date	Round	Opponents	Result	Goalscorers	Attendance
13 August 1977	Round 1 First Leg	Chester (H)	2–0	Cochrane (2) 23', 51'	4,792
17 August 1977	Round 1 Second Leg	Chester (A)	0–1		4,097
30 August 1977	Round 2	Norwich City (H)	3–1	Morley 24', Noble 29', Ingham 88'	6,492
25 October 1977	Round 3	Ipswich Town (H)	1–2	Fletcher 4'	9,581

=== Anglo-Scottish Cup ===
Date	Round	Opponents	Result	Goalscorers	Attendance
2 August 1977	Preliminary Group	Blackburn Rovers (H)	2–1	Smith 8', Ingham 60'	8,119
6 August 1977	Preliminary Group	Bolton Wanderers (A)	0–1		8,250
9 August 1977	Preliminary Group	Blackpool (H)	0–4		5,515
