= 1976–77 Burnley F.C. season =

English football club season

Burnley
1976–77 season
- Chairman: Bob Lord
- Manager: Joe Brown (until February 1977); Harry Potts
- Division Two: 16th
- League Cup: 2nd Round
- FA Cup: 4th Round
- Anglo-Scottish Cup: Preliminary Group
- Top goalscorer: League: Peter Noble (13); All: Peter Noble (15)
- Highest home attendance: 20,433 v Bolton Wanderers (12 April 1977)
- Lowest home attendance: 8,427 v Millwall (18 December 1976)
- Average home league attendance: 12,173

The 1976–77 season was Burnley's first consecutive season in the second tier of English football. They were initially managed by Joe Brown until February 1977, when Harry Potts took over.

== Appearances and goals ==
No.	Pos	Nat	Player	Total		Division Two		League Cup		FA Cup		AS Cup	
No.	Pos	Nat	Player	Apps	Goals	Apps	Goals	Apps	Goals	Apps	Goals	Apps	Goals
	MF	(England) ENG	Paul Bradshaw	4	2	3+0	2	1+0	0	0+0	0	0+0	0
	DF	(England) ENG	Ian Brennan	33	2	31+0	2	0+0	0	2+0	0	0+0	0
	MF	(Northern Ireland) NIR	Terry Cochrane	24	4	20+1	4	0+0	0	2+1	0	0+0	0
	FW	(England) ENG	Paul Fletcher	35	6	30+1	4	0+0	0	3+0	2	1+0	0
	MF	(Wales) WAL	Brian Flynn	48	4	41+0	2	1+0	0	3+0	1	3+0	1
	FW	(England) ENG	Ray Hankin	10	2	6+0	2	1+0	0	0+0	0	3+0	0
	MF	(England) ENG	Billy Ingham	32	3	24+3	2	1+0	0	2+0	0	2+0	1
	MF	(Scotland) SCO	Joe Jakub	5	0	5+0	0	0+0	0	0+0	0	0+0	0
	FW	(England) ENG	David Loggie	5	0	3+1	0	0+0	0	0+0	0	0+1	0
	MF	(England) ENG	Tony Morley	36	2	31+3	2	0+1	0	0+1	0	0+0	0
	MF	(England) ENG	Colin Morris	3	0	0+0	0	0+0	0	0+0	0	3+0	0
	DF	(England) ENG	Keith Newton	37	1	30+0	1	1+0	0	3+0	0	3+0	0
	MF	(England) ENG	Peter Noble	49	15	42+0	13	1+0	0	3+0	1	3+0	1
	DF	(England) ENG	Terry Pashley	11	0	10+1	0	0+0	0	0+0	0	0+0	0
	GK	(Republic of Ireland) IRL	Gerry Peyton	13	0	10+0	0	1+0	0	0+0	0	2+0	0
	DF	(England) ENG	Peter Robinson	23	1	20+0	1	0+0	0	3+0	0	0+0	0
	DF	(England) ENG	Billy Rodaway	49	0	42+0	0	1+0	0	3+0	0	3+0	0
	DF	(England) ENG	Derek Scott	19	0	13+1	0	1+0	0	1+0	0	3+0	0
	FW	(Scotland) SCO	Malcolm Smith	32	11	30+0	11	0+0	0	2+0	0	0+0	0
	GK	(England) ENG	Alan Stevenson	36	0	32+0	0	0+0	0	3+0	0	1+0	0
	MF	(England) ENG	Mike Summerbee	16	0	12+0	0	1+0	0	0+0	0	3+0	0
	DF	(Scotland) SCO	Jim Thomson	34	0	27+0	0	1+0	0	3+0	0	3+0	0

== Matches ==
=== Football League Division Two ===
Key

- In Result column, Burnley's score shown first
- H = Home match
- A = Away match
- pen. = Penalty kick
- o.g. = Own goal

Results

Date	Opponents	Result	Goalscorers	Attendance
21 August 1976	Wolverhampton Wanderers (A)	0–0		19,480
24 August 1976	Fulham (H)	3–1	Hankin 17', Bradshaw 27', Noble 58' (pen.)	11,506
28 August 1976	Luton Town (H)	1–2	Bradshaw 36'	12,262
4 September 1976	Hereford United (A)	0–3		9,548
11 September 1976	Southampton (H)	2–0	Hankin 20', Noble 63'	9,142
18 September 1976	Carlisle United (A)	1–2	Smith 71'	8,969
25 September 1976	Hull City (H)	0–0		10,320
2 October 1976	Sheffield United (A)	0–1		16,082
9 October 1976	Orient (H)	3–3	Fletcher 23', Cochrane 37', Smith 48'	10,228
16 October 1976	Charlton Athletic (H)	4–4	Smith 12', Noble 72', Fletcher 74', Cochrane 85'	10,601
23 October 1976	Nottingham Forest (A)	2–5	Flynn 19', Smith 48'	15,279
30 October 1976	Plymouth Argyle (A)	1–0	Smith 58'	14,704
6 November 1976	Oldham Athletic (H)	1–0	Noble 59' (pen.)	14,305
9 November 1976	Bolton Wanderers (A)	1–2	Smith 1'	21,737
20 November 1976	Bristol Rovers (H)	1–1	Noble 10'	10,371
27 November 1976	Chelsea (A)	1–2	Noble 77'	28,595
4 December 1976	Cardiff City (H)	0–0		8,967
18 December 1976	Millwall (H)	1–3	Cochrane 31'	8,427
27 December 1976	Blackburn Rovers (A)	2–2	Noble 80', Brennan 88'	22,189
28 December 1976	Blackpool (H)	0–0		19,682
3 January 1977	Plymouth Argyle (H)	0–2		10,406
15 January 1977	Fulham (A)	2–2	Noble 24' (pen.), Fletcher 30'	8,815
22 January 1977	Wolverhampton Wanderers (H)	0–0		13,638
5 February 1977	Luton Town (A)	0–2		8,638
12 February 1977	Hereford United (H)	1–1	Noble 54'	8,748
15 February 1977	Oldham Athletic (A)	1–3	Flynn 20'	12,438
19 February 1977	Southampton (A)	0–2		17,981
26 February 1977	Carlisle United (H)	2–0	Cochrane 54', Noble 67' (pen.)	10,834
2 March 1977	Notts County (A)	1–5	Smith 70'	8,492
5 March 1977	Hull City (A)	1–4	Smith 4'	6,636
12 March 1977	Sheffield United (H)	1–0	Smith 67'	10,608
19 March 1977	Orient (A)	1–0	Brennan 9'	5,610
2 April 1977	Nottingham Forest (H)	0–1		11,112
8 April 1977	Blackburn Rovers (H)	3–1	Smith 6', Noble 63', Robinson 82'	17,372
9 April 1977	Blackpool (A)	1–1	Smith 32'	14,526
12 April 1977	Bolton Wanderers (H)	0–0		20,433
16 April 1977	Bristol Rovers (A)	1–1	Noble 64'	6,375
23 April 1977	Chelsea (H)	1–0	Ingham 85'	14,977
26 April 1977	Charlton Athletic (A)	2–5	Newton 24', Ingham 83'	6,592
30 April 1977	Cardiff City (A)	1–0	Noble 6'	11,247
7 May 1977	Notts County (H)	3–1	Morley (2) 9', 85', Fletcher 27'	11,699
14 May 1977	Millwall (A)	0–2		6,833

=== Final league position ===
Pos	Team	Pld	W	D	L	GF	GA	GD	Pts	Qualification or relegation
14	Hull City	42	10	17	15	45	53	−8	37	
15	Bristol Rovers	42	12	13	17	53	68	−15	37	
16	Burnley	42	11	14	17	46	64	−18	36	
17	Fulham	42	11	13	18	54	61	−7	35	
18	Cardiff City	42	12	10	20	56	67	−11	34	Qualification for the Cup Winners' Cup first round

Rules for classification: 1) Points; 2) Goal difference; 3) Goals scored

=== FA Cup ===
Date	Round	Opponents	Result	Goalscorers	Attendance
8 January 1977	Round 3	Lincoln City (H)	2–2	Noble 11', Fletcher 58'	11,583
12 January 1977	Replay	Lincoln City (A)	1–0	Fletcher 70'	11,414
29 January 1977	Round 4	Port Vale (A)	1–2	Flynn 89' (pen.)	18,068

=== League Cup ===
Date	Round	Opponents	Result	Goalscorers	Attendance
2 September 1976	Round 2	Torquay United (A)	0–1		7,084

=== Anglo-Scottish Cup ===
Date	Round	Opponents	Result	Goalscorers	Attendance
7 August 1976	Preliminary Group	Blackburn Rovers (A)	1–1	Flynn 42'	11,012
11 August 1976	Preliminary Group	Blackpool (A)	1–2	Noble 89'	9,386
14 August 1976	Preliminary Group	Bolton Wanderers (H)	1–0	Ingham 25'	9,028
