= 1979–80 Burnley F.C. season =

English football club season

Burnley
1979–80 season
- Chairman: Bob Lord
- Manager: Harry Potts (until October 1979); Brian Miller
- Division Two: 21st (relegated)
- League Cup: Second round
- FA Cup: Fourth round
- Anglo-Scottish Cup: Preliminary Group
- Top goalscorer: League: Billy Hamilton (7); All: Billy Hamilton & Martin Dobson (7)
- Highest home attendance: 16,634 v Newcastle United (26 December 1979)
- Lowest home attendance: 5,353 v Bristol Rovers (12 April 1980)
- Average home league attendance: 8,118

The 1979–80 season was Burnley's fourth consecutive season in the second tier of English football. They were initially managed by Harry Potts until October 1979, when Brian Miller took charge of the club.

== Appearances and goals ==
No.	Pos	Nat	Player	Total		Division Two		League Cup		FA Cup		AS Cup	
No.	Pos	Nat	Player	Apps	Goals	Apps	Goals	Apps	Goals	Apps	Goals	Apps	Goals
	DF	(England) ENG	Tony Arins	23	2	22+0	2	1+0	0	0+0	0	0+0	0
	DF	(England) ENG	Ian Brennan	33	1	27+1	0	2+0	0	1+0	0	2+0	1
	MF	(Scotland) SCO	Marshall Burke	19	4	16+1	4	0+0	0	2+0	0	0+0	0
	MF	(England) ENG	Martyn Busby	4	1	4+0	1	0+0	0	0+0	0	0+0	0
	MF	(England) ENG	Phil Cavener	16	2	8+6	2	0+0	0	1+1	0	0+0	0
	DF	(Northern Ireland) NIR	Paul Dixon	16	1	15+0	1	0+0	0	1+0	0	0+0	0
	MF	(England) ENG	Martin Dobson	36	7	29+0	5	2+0	1	2+0	1	3+0	0
	FW	(England) ENG	Paul Fletcher	17	0	13+0	0	1+0	0	0+0	0	3+0	0
	MF	(Scotland) SCO	Brian Hall	5	0	5+0	0	0+0	0	0+0	0	0+0	0
	FW	(Northern Ireland) NIR	Billy Hamilton	27	7	25+0	7	0+0	0	2+0	0	0+0	0
	MF	(England) ENG	Billy Ingham	13	1	7+1	0	2+0	0	0+0	0	3+0	1
	MF	(Scotland) SCO	Joe Jakub	26	0	23+0	0	2+0	0	0+0	0	1+0	0
	MF	(Wales) WAL	Leighton James	45	6	39+0	6	2+0	0	1+0	0	3+0	0
	FW	(England) ENG	Steve Kindon	16	4	9+2	3	1+1	0	0+0	0	3+0	1
	DF	(England) ENG	Brian Laws	1	0	1+0	0	0+0	0	0+0	0	0+0	0
	DF	(Northern Ireland) NIR	Steve McAdam	5	0	5+0	0	0+0	0	0+0	0	0+0	0
	MF	(England) ENG	Peter Noble	15	4	11+0	3	1+0	0	0+0	0	3+0	1
	GK	(England) ENG	Billy O'Rourke	2	0	2+0	0	0+0	0	0+0	0	0+0	0
	DF	(England) ENG	Richard Overson	5	0	4+1	0	0+0	0	0+0	0	0+0	0
	DF	(England) ENG	Vince Overson	24	0	22+0	0	0+0	0	2+0	0	0+0	0
	MF	(Scotland) SCO	Stuart Robertson	8	0	8+0	0	0+0	0	0+0	0	0+0	0
	DF	(England) ENG	Peter Robinson	5	0	3+1	0	0+0	0	0+0	0	1+0	0
	DF	(England) ENG	Billy Rodaway	36	0	28+1	0	2+0	0	2+0	0	3+0	0
	DF	(England) ENG	Derek Scott	35	2	27+1	2	2+0	0	2+0	0	3+0	0
	FW	(England) ENG	Malcolm Smith	24	1	22+0	1	0+0	0	2+0	0	0+0	0
	GK	(England) ENG	Alan Stevenson	47	0	40+0	0	2+0	0	2+0	0	3+0	0
	MF	(England) ENG	Jeff Tate	5	1	5+0	1	0+0	0	0+0	0	0+0	0
	DF	(Scotland) SCO	Jim Thomson	24	0	20+0	0	2+0	0	0+0	0	2+0	0
	MF	(England) ENG	Kevin Young	27	0	22+3	0	0+0	0	2+0	0	0+0	0

== Matches ==
=== Football League Division Two ===
Key

- In Result column, Burnley's score shown first
- H = Home match
- A = Away match
- pen. = Penalty kick
- o.g. = Own goal

Results

Date	Opponents	Result	Goalscorers	Attendance
18 August 1979	Orient (A)	2–2	James 37', Kindon 76'	6,151
21 August 1979	Charlton Athletic (H)	1–1	Kindon 47'	6,924
25 August 1979	Notts County (H)	0–1		7,005
1 September 1979	Swansea City (A)	1–2	Noble 7'	16,670
8 September 1979	Oldham Athletic (H)	1–1	Kindon 84'	6,974
15 September 1979	Fulham (A)	1–3	Noble 36' (pen.)	6,633
22 September 1979	Sunderland (H)	1–1	Dobson 48'	8,872
29 September 1979	West Ham United (A)	1–2	Scott 40'	18,327
6 October 1979	Chelsea (H)	0–1		8,458
9 October 1979	Charlton Athletic (A)	3–3	Dobson 63', James 64', Noble 75'	5,279
13 October 1979	Cardiff City (H)	0–2		6,450
20 October 1979	Preston North End (A)	2–3	Dobson 25', James 77'	12,323
27 October 1979	Queens Park Rangers (A)	0–7		11,261
3 November 1979	Orient (H)	1–2	Arins 70'	6,777
10 November 1979	Leicester City (A)	1–1	James 65'	17,191
17 November 1979	Luton Town (H)	0–0		7,119
24 November 1979	Cambridge United (H)	5–3	Burke 12', Dobson 42', Biley 67' (o.g.), James 86', Tate 89'	6,873
1 December 1979	Bristol Rovers (A)	0–0		5,373
8 December 1979	Watford (H)	1–0	Burke 40'	8,608
15 December 1979	Birmingham City (A)	0–2		13,997
21 December 1979	Wrexham (H)	1–0	Burke 67'	7,042
26 December 1979	Newcastle United (H)	3–2	Hamilton 35', Smith 47', Dobson 74' (pen.)	16,634
29 December 1979	Notts County (A)	3–2	Cavener (2) 18', 74', Hamilton 24'	7,596
1 January 1980	Shrewsbury Town (A)	0–2		10,504
12 January 1980	Swansea City (H)	0–0		8,853
2 February 1980	Fulham (H)	2–1	Burke 48', James 83'	6,977
9 February 1980	Sunderland (A)	0–5		21,855
19 February 1980	West Ham United (H)	0–1		9,030
23 February 1980	Cardiff City (A)	1–2	Hamilton 50'	6,342
1 March 1980	Preston North End (H)	1–1	Dixon 85'	11,046
4 March 1980	Oldham Athletic (A)	1–2	Arins 21'	9,519
8 March 1980	Queens Park Rangers (H)	0–3		7,579
15 March 1980	Chelsea (A)	1–2	Busby 25'	16,519
22 March 1980	Leicester City (H)	1–2	Scott 83'	7,173
29 March 1980	Luton Town (A)	1–1	Hamilton 60'	8,507
4 April 1980	Wrexham (A)	0–1		6,605
5 April 1980	Shrewsbury Town (H)	0–0		6,333
7 April 1980	Newcastle United (A)	1–1	Hamilton 72'	18,863
12 April 1980	Bristol Rovers (H)	1–1	Hamilton 87'	5,353
19 April 1980	Cambridge United (A)	1–3	Hamilton 15'	4,727
26 April 1980	Birmingham City (H)	0–0		10,388
3 May 1980	Watford (A)	0–4		11,931

=== Final league position ===
Pos	Team	Pld	W	D	L	GF	GA	GD	Pts	Qualification or relegation
18	Watford	42	12	13	17	39	46	−7	37	
19	Bristol Rovers	42	11	13	18	50	64	−14	35	
20	Fulham (R)	42	11	7	24	42	74	−32	29	Relegation to the Third Division
21	Burnley (R)	42	6	15	21	39	73	−34	27	Relegation to the Third Division
22	Charlton Athletic (R)	42	6	10	26	39	78	−39	22	Relegation to the Third Division

Rules for classification: 1) Points; 2) Goal difference; 3) Goals scored
(R) Relegated

=== FA Cup ===
Date	Round	Opponents	Result	Goalscorers	Attendance
5 January 1980	Round 3	Stoke City (H)	1–0	Dobson 76' (pen.)	13,478
26 January 1980	Round 4	Bury (A)	0–1		17,722

=== League Cup ===
Date	Round	Opponents	Result	Goalscorers	Attendance
26 August 1979	Round 2 First leg	Wolverhampton Wanderers (H)	1–1	Dobson 38'	6,163
4 September 1979	Round 2 Second leg	Wolverhampton Wanderers (A)	0–2		17,411

=== Anglo-Scottish Cup ===
Date	Round	Opponents	Result	Goalscorers	Attendance
4 August 1979	Preliminary Group	Blackburn Rovers (A)	2–2	Kindon 1', Metcalfe 68' (o.g.)	7,749
7 August 1979	Preliminary Group	Blackpool (A)	2–3	Noble 58' (pen.), Ingham 90'	5,003
11 August 1979	Preliminary Group	Preston North End (H)	1–2	Brennan 62'	6,171
