= 1978–79 Burnley F.C. season =

English football club season

Burnley
1978–79 season
- Chairman: Bob Lord
- Manager: Harry Potts
- Division Two: 13th
- League Cup: 3rd Round
- FA Cup: 5th Round
- Anglo-Scottish Cup: Winners
- Top goalscorer: League: Peter Noble (14); All: Peter Noble (16)
- Highest home attendance: 30,000 v Celtic (12 September 1978)
- Lowest home attendance: 4,750 v Blackpool (8 August 1978)
- Average home league attendance: 10,748

The 1978–79 season was Burnley's third consecutive season in the second tier of English football. They were managed by Harry Potts.

== Appearances and goals ==
No.	Pos	Nat	Player	Total		Division Two		League Cup		FA Cup		AS Cup	
No.	Pos	Nat	Player	Apps	Goals	Apps	Goals	Apps	Goals	Apps	Goals	Apps	Goals
	DF	(England) ENG	Tony Arins	9	0	7+0	0	0+0	0	0+0	0	2+0	0
	DF	(England) ENG	Ian Brennan	54	6	38+0	4	3+0	1	4+0	0	9+0	1
	MF	(Northern Ireland) NIR	Terry Cochrane	12	4	6+0	1	3+0	2	0+0	0	3+0	1
	FW	(England) ENG	Paul Fletcher	50	11	34+1	9	3+0	0	2+1	1	9+0	1
	MF	(Scotland) SCO	Brian Hall	36	2	25+3	2	0+0	0	3+0	0	5+0	0
	MF	(England) ENG	Billy Ingham	52	13	37+0	9	3+0	1	4+0	1	8+0	2
	MF	(Scotland) SCO	Joe Jakub	13	0	13+0	0	0+0	0	0+0	0	0+0	0
	MF	(Wales) WAL	Leighton James	48	5	37+0	3	1+0	0	4+0	1	6+0	1
	FW	(England) ENG	Steve Kindon	53	10	37+1	3	2+0	0	4+0	1	9+0	6
	MF	(England) ENG	Tony Morley	23	3	12+7	2	1+0	0	2+0	1	1+0	0
	MF	(England) ENG	Peter Noble	57	16	41+0	14	3+0	1	4+0	0	9+0	1
	MF	(Scotland) SCO	Stuart Robertson	1	0	0+1	0	0+0	0	0+0	0	0+0	0
	DF	(England) ENG	Peter Robinson	14	1	8+5	1	0+0	0	1+0	0	0+0	0
	DF	(England) ENG	Billy Rodaway	54	0	39+0	0	3+0	0	4+0	0	8+0	0
	DF	(England) ENG	Derek Scott	50	1	35+0	1	3+0	0	4+0	0	8+0	0
	FW	(Scotland) SCO	Malcolm Smith	15	3	9+0	1	2+0	0	0+0	0	4+0	2
	GK	(England) ENG	Alan Stevenson	58	0	42+0	0	3+0	0	4+0	0	9+0	0
	DF	(Scotland) SCO	Jim Thomson	57	3	41+0	1	3+0	0	4+0	1	9+0	1
	MF	(England) ENG	Kevin Young	1	0	1+0	0	0+0	0	0+0	0	0+0	0

== Matches ==
=== Football League Division Two ===
Key

- In Result column, Burnley's score shown first
- H = Home match
- A = Away match
- pen. = Penalty kick
- o.g. = Own goal

Results

Date	Opponents	Result	Goalscorers	Attendance
19 August 1978	Leicester City (H)	2–2	Fletcher 46', Noble 69' (pen.)	12,048
22 August 1978	Charlton Athletic (A)	1–1	Cochrane 22'	8,580
26 August 1978	Fulham (A)	0–0		6,135
2 September 1978	Notts County (H)	2–1	Noble 11' (pen.), Brennan 69'	9,787
9 September 1978	West Ham United (H)	3–2	Brennan 37', Fletcher 50', Thomson 81'	12,392
16 September 1978	Sheffield United (A)	0–4		15,355
23 September 1978	Sunderland (H)	1–2	Morley 75'	13,368
30 September 1978	Millwall (A)	2–0	Fletcher 23', Noble 64'	5,389
7 October 1978	Oldham Athletic (H)	1–0	Smith 85'	11,835
14 October 1978	Stoke City (A)	1–3	Ingham 17'	18,434
21 October 1978	Brighton & Hove Albion (H)	3–0	Ingham (2) 57', 75', Brennan 71'	10,321
28 October 1978	Preston North End (A)	2–2	Kindon 18', Noble 67' (pen.)	14,975
4 November 1978	Crystal Palace (H)	2–1	Brennan 16', Fletcher 48'	11,129
11 November 1978	Leicester City (A)	1–2	Ingham 88'	12,842
18 November 1978	Fulham (H)	5–3	Noble (3) 20' (pen.), 26' (pen.), 83', James 46', Kindon 85'	10,566
21 November 1978	Notts County (A)	1–1	Ingham 76'	8,520
25 November 1978	Cambridge United (A)	2–2	Ingham 42', Fletcher 61'	6,502
9 December 1978	Orient (A)	1–2	Fletcher 40'	4,754
16 December 1978	Bristol Rovers (H)	2–0	Ingham (2) 30', 80'	9,257
23 December 1978	Newcastle United (A)	1–3	Noble 86'	23,639
26 December 1978	Blackburn Rovers (H)	2–1	Fletcher 5', Noble 43'	23,133
30 December 1978	Cardiff City (H)	0–0		9,821
3 February 1979	Sunderland (A)	1–3	James 44'	23,030
24 February 1979	Stoke City (H)	0–3		13,890
3 March 1979	Brighton & Hove Albion (A)	1–2	Ingham 51'	19,379
6 March 1979	Sheffield United (H)	1–1	Fletcher 32'	8,208
10 March 1979	Preston North End (H)	1–1	Noble 51'	15,270
13 March 1979	Luton Town (H)	2–1	Noble (2) 42' (pen.), 54'	7,691
21 March 1979	Wrexham (A)	1–0	Fletcher 38'	8,840
24 March 1979	Charlton Athletic (H)	2–1	James 14', Scott 89'	8,560
31 March 1979	Cambridge United (H)	1–1	Robinson 18'	8,234
7 April 1979	Luton Town (A)	1–4	Noble 58' (pen.)	6,466
10 April 1979	Newcastle United (H)	1–0	Hall 10'	7,771
14 April 1979	Blackburn Rovers (A)	2–1	Morley 46', Hall 71'	14,761
16 April 1979	Wrexham (H)	0–0		9,401
21 April 1979	Bristol Rovers (A)	0–2		5,947
24 April 1979	West Ham United (A)	1–3	Noble 1'	24,139
28 April 1979	Orient (H)	0–1		7,195
5 May 1979	Cardiff City (A)	1–1	Kindon 41'	10,254
8 May 1979	Millwall (H)	0–1		5,837
11 May 1979	Crystal Palace (A)	0–2		51,482
14 May 1979	Oldham Athletic F.C. (A)	0–2		6,791

=== Final league position ===
Pos	Team	Pld	W	D	L	GF	GA	GD	Pts	Qualification or relegation
11	Orient	42	15	10	17	51	51	0	40	
12	Cambridge United	42	12	16	14	44	52	−8	40	
13	Burnley	42	14	12	16	51	62	−11	40	
14	Oldham Athletic	42	13	13	16	52	61	−9	39	
15	Wrexham	42	12	14	16	45	42	+3	38	Qualification for the Cup Winners' Cup first round

Rules for classification: 1) Points; 2) Goal difference; 3) Goals scored

=== FA Cup ===
Date	Round	Opponents	Result	Goalscorers	Attendance
9 January 1979	Round 3	Birmingham City (A)	2–0	Morley 1', James 85'	15,535
21 February 1979	Round 4	Sunderland (H)	1–1	Thomson 28'	20,852
26 February 1979	Replay	Sunderland (A)	3–0	Fletcher 5', Ingham 20', Kindon 88'	37,507
28 February 1979	Round 5	Liverpool (A)	0–3		47,161

=== League Cup ===
Date	Round	Opponents	Result	Goalscorers	Attendance
29 August 1978	Round 2	Bradford City (H)	1–1	Cochrane 75'	9,185
5 September 1978	Replay	Bradford City (A)	3–2	Noble 47', Cochrane 75', Ingham 86'	9,192
3 October 1978	Round 3	Brighton & Hove Albion (H)	1–3	Brennan 64'	9,076

=== Anglo-Scottish Cup ===
Date	Round	Opponents	Result	Goalscorers	Attendance
5 August 1978	Preliminary Group	Preston North End (H)	3–2	Kindon 5', Ingham 43', Fletcher 72'	7,456
8 August 1978	Preliminary Group	Blackpool (H)	3–1	Ingham 21', Smith 34', Cochrane 82'	4,750
12 August 1978	Preliminary Group	Blackburn Rovers (A)	1–1	Smith 2'	6,171
12 September 1978	Quarter Final First Leg	Celtic (H)	1–0	Kindon 56'	30,000
27 September 1978	Quarter Final Second Leg	Celtic (A)	2–1	Brennan 21', Kindon 26'	28,000
31 October 1978	Semi Final First Leg	Mansfield Town (A)	2–1	Kindon 79', James 82'	5,517
7 November 1978	Semi Final Second Leg	Mansfield Town (H)	0–1 (a.e.t.) (8 – 7p)		6,871
5 December 1978	Final First Leg	Oldham Athletic (A)	4–1	Kindon (2) 1', 75', Noble 3', Thomson 67'	10,456
12 December 1978	Final Second Leg	Oldham Athletic (H)	0–1		10,865
