= 1973 FA Charity Shield =

Association football match between Manchester City and Burnley

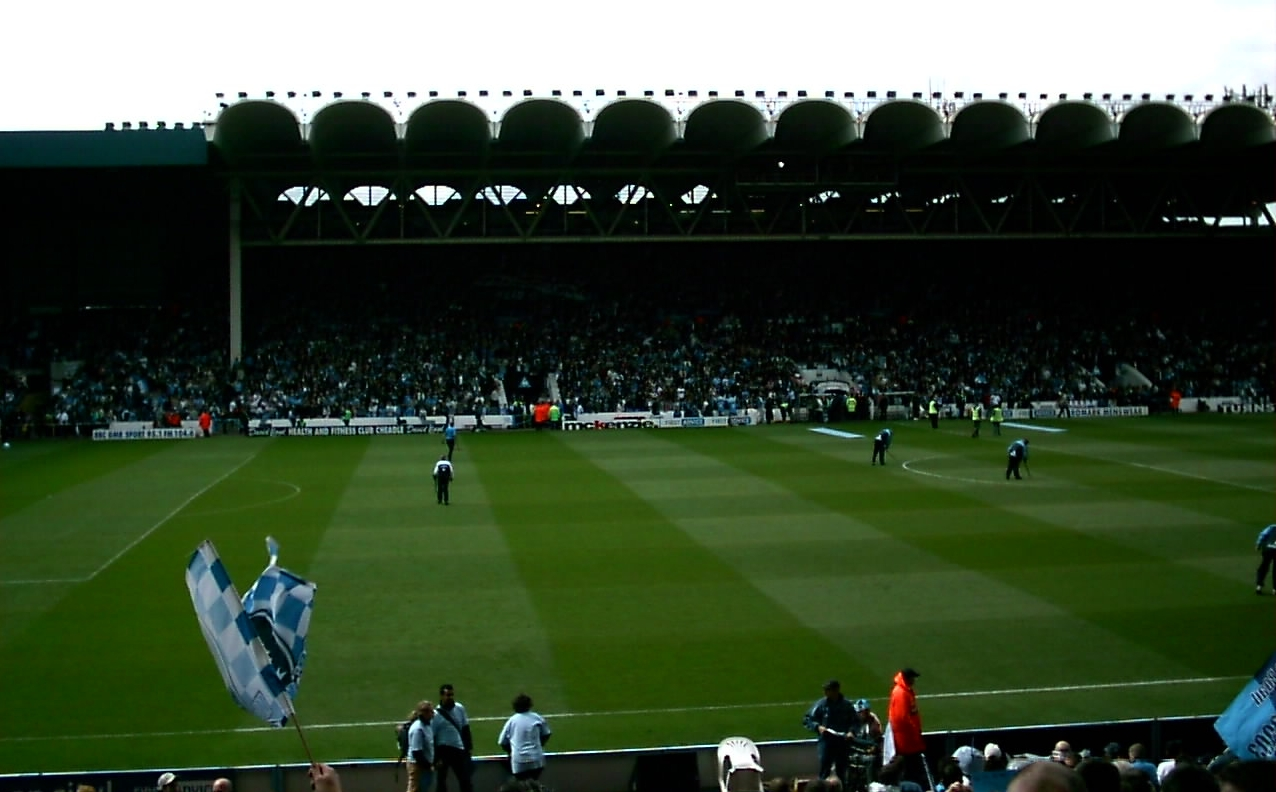
- The match took place at Maine Road (2003 photograph).
- Event: 51st FA Charity Shield
Manchester City	Burnley
0	1
- Date: 18 August 1973
- Venue: Maine Road, Manchester
- Referee: Gordon Hill (Leicester)
- Attendance: 23,988
- Weather: Sunny

The 1973 FA Charity Shield was the 51st FA Charity Shield, an annual English association football match. The game took place on 18 August 1973 at Maine Road in Manchester and was played between Manchester City, reigning holders of the shield, and Football League Second Division champions Burnley. It was the norm from 1930 that the FA Charity Shield was contested between the Football League First Division champions and the FA Cup winners. The 1973 FA Charity Shield was, however, the third consecutive edition in which neither the First Division winners nor the FA Cup champions chose to compete; the Football Association (FA) invited City and Burnley instead. This was City's seventh Charity Shield appearance to Burnley's third.

In an entertaining game, the first half ended goalless, although City dominated and almost went a goal ahead after a shot from Alan Oakes hit the Burnley crossbar. Burnley began to dominate the game from the 60th minute. Six minutes later, they scored via a free-kick routine: Doug Collins pretended to take the free-kick but left it for Frank Casper whose cross was headed in powerfully by defender Colin Waldron. Burnley held on to their 1–0 lead to win their second Charity Shield, following a shared title in 1960. Martin Dobson, the Burnley captain, received the trophy from Andrew Stephen, the chairman of the FA. As of 2023, Burnley have not played in a Charity Shield match since 1973. City's next appearance in the competition—renamed the FA Community Shield in 2002—was in 2011.

== Background and pre-match ==
The FA Charity Shield was founded in 1908 as a successor to the Sheriff of London Charity Shield, which was a competition played between the best professional team and the leading amateur side. A dispute between amateur clubs and the Football Association (FA) led to the abandonment of the match in 1908. The FA Charity Shield was initially a contest between the respective champions of the Football League and the Southern League. Different formats were used during the following years: in 1913, a Professional XI played an Amateur XI, and in 1921, the fixture was played by the Football League champions and FA Cup winners for the first time, which became the norm from 1930. In 1971, double winners Arsenal withdrew from the competition due to previously arranged pre-season friendlies; Football League Second Division champions Leicester City and FA Cup runners-up Liverpool played instead. The following year, Football League First Division champions Derby County and FA Cup winners Leeds United both declined to play in the Charity Shield; Manchester City and Aston Villa replaced Derby and Leeds.

The 1973 FA Charity Shield was the third consecutive edition in which neither the First Division winners (Liverpool) nor the FA Cup champions (Sunderland) chose to compete. Bill Shankly, the Liverpool manager, explained that his preparation was geared towards having his squad ready for the first league match of the season, not for the Charity Shield held the week before. Shankly also feared possible injuries to his players. On 25 May 1973, the FA announced that the next FA Charity Shield game would take place on 18 August at 3 pm, contested by Manchester City, reigning holders of the Shield, and Second Division champions Burnley. The venue was Maine Road, home ground of Manchester City.

Manchester City finished the 1972–73 First Division in 11th place and reached the fifth round of the FA Cup; they won the 1972 FA Charity Shield after defeating Aston Villa 1–0. Burnley won the 1972–73 Second Division title, losing only 4 times in 42 matches. They won the championship in the last match of the season, away at local rivals Preston North End, after a 1–1 draw with Colin Waldron scoring for Burnley.

This was Manchester City's seventh Charity Shield appearance; before the game they had won three shields (1937, 1968 and 1972) and lost three (1934, 1956 and 1969). Burnley were appearing in their third Charity Shield match. They lost in 1921 and shared the 1960 FA Charity Shield after a draw with Wolverhampton Wanderers. (Note: Until 1993, in the event of a draw, the FA Charity Shield would be shared between the two competing teams, with each team having possession of the trophy for six months.)

Previewing the match, Burnley manager Jimmy Adamson stated: "We are treating this as part of our pre-season build up, but there is no doubt that we want to win". Adamson added: "We shall be the underdogs, but I think we could surprise them". Denis Law returned to Manchester City having left the club in 1961; he was named in City's starting lineup. Adamson made one change from the team which had won the Second Division title at Preston North End in April: Mick Docherty replaced Billy Ingham in defence.

== Match ==
=== Summary ===
The match kicked off in sunny conditions at Maine Road in front of a crowd of 23,988 and was refereed by Gordon Hill of Leicester. Manchester City were in charge early on in the match and had two corners and a free-kick before Burnley cleared the ball. Shortly afterwards a timely tackle from Docherty prevented City from taking the lead when Law had a goalscoring chance at close range. City kept up the pressure and almost went in front when a powerful shot from Alan Oakes hit the Burnley crossbar. Shortly afterwards Mike Doyle was in front of the Burnley goal, but his shot went wide. During the opening 30 minutes, Burnley regularly lost possession and found it difficult to adapt to the high tempo of the match; towards the end of the first half, the pace slowed and Burnley grew into the game. The first half ended goalless.

City started the second half well and dominated the game. Alan Stevenson, the Burnley goalkeeper, made several saves to keep the score level. Around the 60th minute, Burnley began to dictate play. Geoff Nulty headed over the City goal from a dangerous position, and Martin Dobson saw his shot saved by the leg of Joe Corrigan, the City goalkeeper. Corrigan also saved from a Nulty header and a powerful shot from 20 yards (18 m) from Frank Casper. In the 66th minute, Burnley received a free-kick after Rodney Marsh fouled Doug Collins on the right-hand edge of the penalty box. Collins pretended to take the free-kick but left it for Casper whose cross was headed in powerfully by defender Waldron to put Burnley 1–0 in front. Waldron had run in unmarked from the edge of the box.

Peter Higgs, writing in the Burnley Express, labelled it an "excellently worked goal" but was also slightly unhappy as it would be more difficult for Burnley to successfully use that free-kick routine again due to the goal being shown on television. Paul Fletcher almost doubled the lead for Burnley when he hit the post. Shortly afterwards Collins played a one-two with Dobson and hit a powerful shot from an angle, but it was saved by Corrigan. Burnley held on to their lead to win the match by one goal to nil. Dobson, the Burnley captain, received the trophy from Andrew Stephen, the chairman of the FA.

=== Details ===
18 August 1973
15:00 BST

Manchester City	0–1	Burnley
		Waldron 66'

Maine Road, Manchester
Attendance: 23,988
Referee: Gordon Hill (Leicester)

Manchester City	Burnley

GK	1	(England) Joe Corrigan
DF	2	(England) Tony Book (c)
DF	3	(Scotland) Willie Donachie
DF	4	(England) Mike Doyle
DF	5	(England) Tommy Booth
MF	6	(England) Alan Oakes
MF	7	(England) Mike Summerbee
MF	8	(England) Colin Bell
FW	9	(Scotland) Denis Law
FW	10	(England) Francis Lee
FW	11	(England) Rodney Marsh
Substitute:
FW	12	(England) Frank Carrodus (unused)
Manager:
(England) Johnny Hart

GK	1	(England) Alan Stevenson
DF	2	(England) Mick Docherty
DF	3	(England) Keith Newton
MF	4	(England) Martin Dobson (c)
DF	5	(England) Colin Waldron
DF	6	(Scotland) Jim Thomson
MF	7	(England) Geoff Nulty
FW	8	(England) Frank Casper
FW	9	(England) Paul Fletcher
MF	10	(England) Doug Collins
FW	11	(Wales) Leighton James
Substitute:
MF	12	(England) Billy Ingham (unused)
Manager:
(England) Jimmy Adamson

== Post-match ==
It was Burnley's second win in the competition, following a shared title in 1960. Higgs of the Burnley Express described it as a "fine match full of end-to-end play, plenty of goal-mouth action and very little of the uglier aspects of football". Higgs named midfielder Collins the best player on Burnley's side, praising his work rate and ball control. Eric Todd, writing in The Guardian, labelled it a "thoroughly entertaining game". Previewing the upcoming 1973–74 First Division, Todd claimed Burnley would "enliven the First Division" as they "have a young side, several really outstanding players, notably Dobson, Collins and James, and an overall discipline". Todd criticised City's ineffective style of play, adding: "City nevertheless have the potential to be one of the most exciting and entertaining sides of the season".

Burnley manager Adamson was pleased with the performance of his players in an entertaining match. He stated that City were the better team in the first half but that Burnley matched them after half-time. Adamson also noted that Docherty helped Burnley grow back into the game during the second half by making overlapping runs down the right wing. Johnny Hart, the Manchester City manager, was furious with the result: "I have given the players a rollicking because we had 80 per cent of the play and were murdering them and then gave away a goal like that". Mike Summerbee, the City winger, praised Burnley: "This could be one of the greatest teams. The big name First Division sides are going to get some shocks this season. Once Burnley have settled in the top flight they could easily become the team of the 1970s". Summerbee became a Burnley player in 1975.

City went on to finish 14th in the 1973–74 season while Burnley finished sixth on their return to the top flight. City reached the fourth round of the 1973–74 FA Cup and were beaten in the final of the Football League Cup by Wolverhampton Wanderers. Burnley were eliminated in the third round of the League Cup and finished third in the FA Cup. (Note: Between 1969–70 and 1973–74, the losing FA Cup semi-finalists took part in a third-place play-off. Burnley defeated Leicester City 1–0 at Filbert Street, Leicester.) As of 2023, Burnley have not played in a Charity Shield match since 1973. City's next appearance in the competition—renamed FA Community Shield in 2002—was in 2011, when they lost 3–2 against Manchester United. City won the trophy the following year after they defeated Chelsea by three goals to two.

The 1974 FA Charity Shield was held at Wembley Stadium, after FA secretary Ted Croker had proposed that the Charity Shield should be played at Wembley between the reigning league champions and the FA Cup holders, as the curtain-raiser to the new season.
