= List of Rochdale A.F.C. managers =

Managers of Rochdale Association Football club

Rochdale A.F.C is an English professional association football club based in Rochdale, England. The club was formed in 1907 and currently plays in League Two, the fourth tier of English football.

Keith Hill was the club's longest serving manager over two spells, from 2006 to 2011, and from 2013 until 2019. Jack Peart has the longest continuous tenure as manager, serving for 7 years, 5 months and 30 days in the 1920s. The club has never won any honours outside promotion (in 1969, 2010 and 2014), and they were runners up in the 1961-62 Football League Cup.

Each manager's entry includes his dates of tenure and the club's competitive record during that period, as well as any honours achieved.

== Key ==
Table headers

- Nationality – The manager's country of birth.
- From – The year of the manager's first game for Rochdale.
- To – The year of the manager's last game for Rochdale.
- P – The number of games managed for Rochdale.
- W – The number of games won as a manager.
- D – The number of games drawn as a manager.
- L – The number of games lost as a manager.
- Win% – The total winning percentage under his management.
- Honours – The titles won while managing Rochdale.

== Managers ==
List of Rochdale A.F.C. managers
| Name | Nationality | From | To | P | W | D | L | Win% | Honours | Notes |
|---|---|---|---|---|---|---|---|---|---|---|
| Billy Bradshaw | England | April 1920 | September 1920 | 1 | 0 | 0 | 1 | 0.00 | | |
| Tom Wilson | | 1 July 1922 | 1 February 1923 | 23 | 10 | 7 | 6 | 43.48 | | |
| Jack Peart | England | 1 February 1923 | 31 July 1930 | 317 | 152 | 58 | 107 | 47.95 | 2 Football League Third Division North runner up (1923–24), (1926–27) | |
| Will Cameron | | 1 August 1930 | 1 December 1931 | 60 | 16 | 8 | 36 | 26.67 | | |
| Herbert Hopkinson | | 1 April 1932 | 1 January 1934 | 70 | 19 | 10 | 41 | 27.14 | | |
| Billy Smith | England | 1 July 1934 | 1 November 1935 | 54 | 15 | 13 | 26 | 27.78 | | |
| Ernest Nixon | | 1 November 1935 | 1 October 1937 | 83 | 21 | 22 | 40 | 25.30 | | |
| Sam Jennings | England | 1 October 1937 | 1 September 1938 | 38 | 11 | 10 | 17 | 28.95 | | |
| Ted Goodier | England | 1 September 1938 | 30 June 1952 | 323 | 126 | 76 | 121 | 39.01 | | |
| Jack Warner | Wales | 1 July 1952 | 31 May 1953 | 47 | 14 | 5 | 28 | 29.79 | | |
| Harry Catterick | England | 1 June 1953 | 1 May 1958 | 238 | 88 | 58 | 92 | 36.97 | | |
| Jack Marshall | England | 1 October 1958 | 1 June 1960 | 87 | 25 | 24 | 38 | 28.74 | | |
| Tony Collins | England | 1 June 1960 | 30 September 1967 | 355 | 129 | 82 | 144 | 36.34 | 1 Football League Cup runner up | |
| Bob Stokoe | England | 1 October 1967 | 1 October 1968 | 49 | 13 | 16 | 20 | 26.53 | | |
| Len Richley | England | 1 October 1968 | 1 February 1970 | 69 | 29 | 19 | 21 | 42.03 | | |
| Dick Conner | England | 1 February 1970 | 1 May 1973 | 157 | 46 | 61 | 50 | 29.30 | | |
| Walter Joyce | England | 1 July 1973 | 6 May 1976 | 157 | 32 | 55 | 70 | 20.38 | | |
| Brian Green | England | 1 June 1976 | 1 September 1977 | 53 | 14 | 14 | 25 | 26.42 | | |
| Mike Ferguson | England | 1 September 1977 | 1 November 1978 | 63 | 9 | 15 | 39 | 14.29 | | |
| Doug Collins | England | 13 January 1979 | 19 November 1979 | 46 | 14 | 9 | 23 | 30.43 | | |
| Bob Stokoe | England | 20 November 1979 | 1 June 1980 | 34 | 7 | 10 | 17 | 20.59 | | |
| Peter Madden | England | 1 June 1980 | 1 March 1983 | 124 | 52 | 31 | 41 | 41.94 | | |
| Jimmy Greenhoff | England | 1 March 1983 | 12 March 1984 | 49 | 11 | 17 | 21 | 22.45 | | |
| Vic Halom | England | 1 May 1984 | 1 December 1986 | 124 | 34 | 38 | 52 | 27.42 | | |
| Eddie Gray | Scotland | 1 December 1986 | 30 June 1988 | 82 | 21 | 25 | 36 | 25.61 | | |
| Danny Bergara | Uruguay | 4 July 1988 | 1 March 1989 | 34 | 8 | 11 | 15 | 23.53 | | |
| Terry Dolan | England | 1 March 1989 | 31 January 1991 | 100 | 40 | 21 | 39 | 40.00 | | |
| Dave Sutton | England | 19 February 1991 | 28 November 1994 | 182 | 69 | 47 | 66 | 37.91 | | |
| Mick Docherty | England | 12 January 1995 | 31 July 1996 | 71 | 21 | 23 | 27 | 29.58 | | |
| Graham Barrow | England | 1 August 1996 | 2 May 1999 | 155 | 50 | 40 | 65 | 32.26 | | |
| David Hamilton | England | 2 May 1999 | 16 June 1999 | 7 | 2 | 3 | 2 | 28.57 | | |
| Steve Parkin | England | 16 June 1999 | 9 November 2001 | 127 | 51 | 39 | 37 | 40.16 | | |
| David Hamilton | England | 9 November 2001 | 11 December 2001 | 1 | 0 | 0 | 1 | 0.00 | | |
| John Hollins | England | 11 December 2001 | 14 May 2002 | 27 | 10 | 10 | 7 | 37.04 | | |
| Paul Simpson | England | 29 May 2002 | 7 May 2003 | 54 | 16 | 17 | 21 | 29.63 | | |
| Alan Buckley | England | 1 June 2003 | 30 December 2003 | 28 | 8 | 15 | 5 | 28.57 | | |
| Steve Parkin | England | 31 December 2003 | 16 December 2006 | 152 | 44 | 51 | 57 | 28.95 | | |
| Keith Hill | England | 16 December 2006 | 1 June 2011 | 231 | 101 | 59 | 71 | 43.72 | | |
| Steve Eyre | England | 18 June 2011 | 19 December 2011 | 27 | 6 | 8 | 13 | 22.22 | | |
| Chris Beech | England | 20 December 2011 | 23 January 2012 | 6 | 0 | 3 | 3 | 0.00 | | |
| John Coleman | England | 24 January 2012 | 21 January 2013 | 52 | 14 | 14 | 24 | 26.92 | | |
| Keith Hill | England | 22 January 2013 | 4 March 2019 | 339 | 134 | 82 | 123 | 39.5 | | |
| Brian Barry-Murphy | Ireland | 4 March 2019 | 30 June 2021 | 109 | 34 | 28 | 47 | 31.2 | | |
| Robbie Stockdale | England | 10 July 2021 | 18 August 2022 | 59 | 16 | 18 | 25 | 27.12 | | |
| Jim McNulty (c) | England | 20 August 2022 | 27 August 2022 | 3 | 0 | 1 | 2 | 0.00 | | |
| Jim Bentley | England | 30 August 2022 | 25 March 2023 | 36 | 7 | 9 | 20 | 19.4 | | |
| Jim McNulty | England | 1 April 2023 | 4 June 2026 | 163 | 82 | 39 | 42 | 50.3 | | |
| Ian Watson | England | 10 June 2026 | 22 November 2026 | 22 | 5 | 5 | 12 | 22.7 | | |
