= Arins =

Arins or Ārinš is a surname. Notable people with the surname include:

- Tony Arins (born 1958), English footballer
- Eižens Ārinš (1911–1987), Soviet KGB secret agent, mathematician, and computer scientist

== See also ==
- Arinsal
- Ariss (surname)
