= Ray Hankin =

English footballer (born 1956)

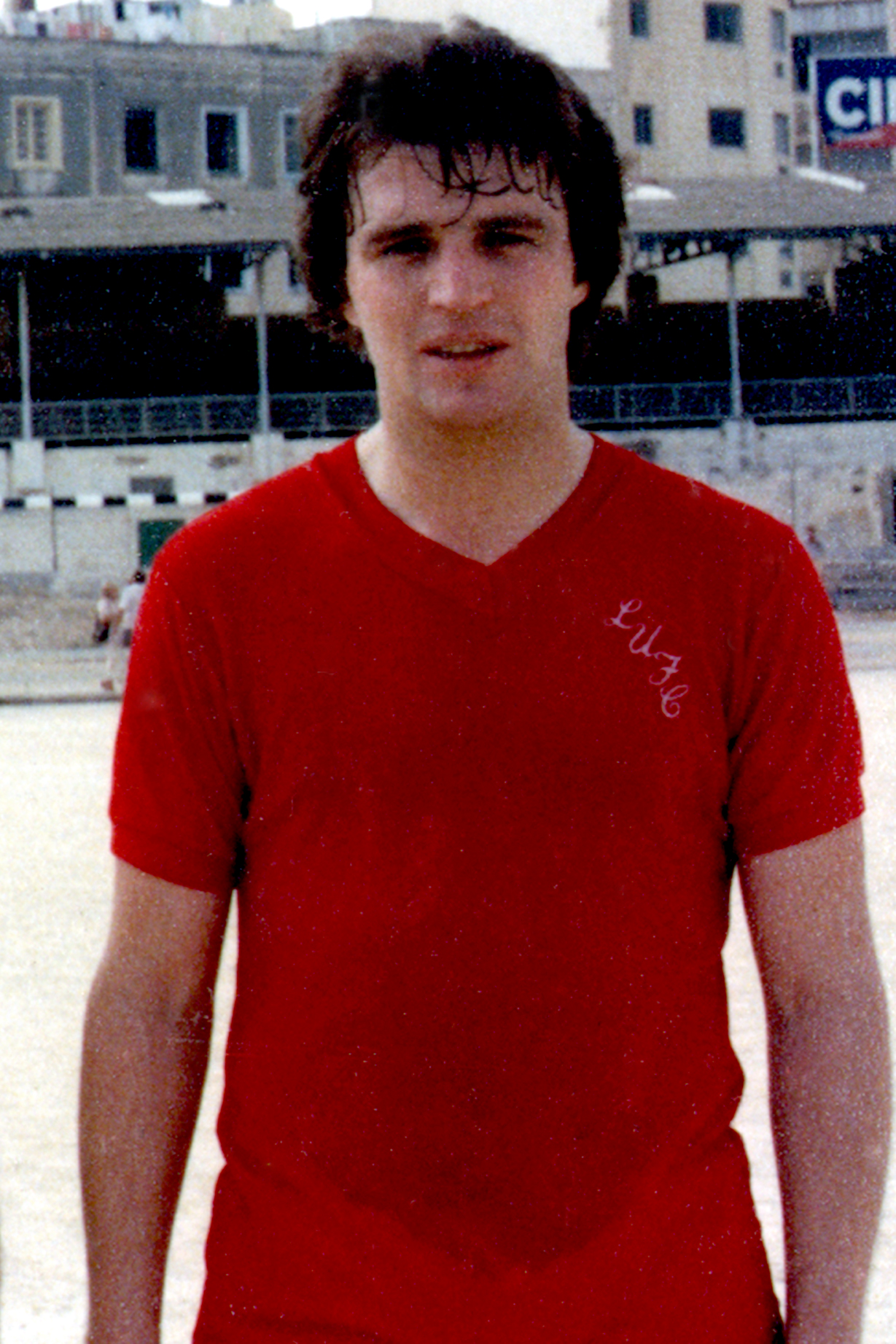
- Hankin in 1979

Personal information
- Full name: Raymond Hankin
- Date of birth: 21 February 1956 (age 70)
- Place of birth: Wallsend, England
- Height: 6 ft 2 in (1.88 m)
- Position: Centre forward

Youth career
- 19??–1970: Wallsend Boys Club
- 1970–1973: Burnley

Senior career*
Years	Team	Apps	(Gls)
1973–1976	Burnley	112	(37)
1976–1980	Leeds United	83	(32)
1980–1981	Vancouver Whitecaps	46	(20)
1981–1982	Arsenal	0	(0)
1982	Shamrock Rovers	3	(1)
1982	Vancouver Whitecaps	27	(11)
1982–1983	Middlesbrough	21	(1)
1983–1985	Peterborough United	33	(8)
1985	Wolverhampton Wanderers	10	(1)
1985–1986	Whitby Town		
1986–1987	Newcastle Blue Star		
19??	Guisborough Town		
Total		335	(111)

International career
1973	England Youth	6	(2)
1974–1975	England U23	3	(0)

Managerial career
- 1989–1991: Northallerton Town
- 1992: Darlington
- * Club domestic league appearances and goals

Raymond Hankin (born 21 February 1956) is an English former professional footballer. A centre forward, he played in the Football League for Burnley, Leeds United, Middlesbrough, Peterborough United and Wolverhampton Wanderers. He spent three seasons with the Vancouver Whitecaps of the NASL, had brief spells with Arsenal and Shamrock Rovers, and finished his playing career in English non-league football. Internationally, he was a member of the England youth team that won the 1973 European Under-18 Championship, and was capped three times for England at under-23 level.

== Career ==
Hankin was born in Wallsend, Northumberland, where he played football for Wallsend Boys Club.

=== Burnley ===
Hankin began his club career in 1970 as an apprentice with Burnley. He turned professional in February 1973, and made his Football League debut on 24 April 1973, at the age of 17 years and 2 months, as an 83rd-minute substitute in a 3–0 win at home to Luton Town that left Burnley needing one point from the final match of the season to win the Second Division title. Hankin was selected in England's squad for the 1973 European Under-18 Championship in Italy in June. He scored the only goal of the semifinal against Italy, and started in the final, in which England beat East Germany 3–2 after extra time to win the tournament.

He made his First Division debut on 5 September 1973 away to Tottenham Hotspur, standing in for Paul Fletcher. He forced a brilliant save from Pat Jennings before, with 13 minutes left and Tottenham 2–1 ahead, being fouled for a disputed penalty from which Burnley equalised, and four minutes later his team scored a winner. In the reverse fixture a week later, he set up a goal for Geoff Nulty and "caused [Tottenham] considerable trouble particularly in the air" in a match that finished 2–2. After Frank Casper was injured during that match, Hankin played regularly. He scored his first goal on his third appearance, with a glancing header to secure a draw at home to Derby County on 15 September, and finished the season with 8 goals from 34 league appearances.

In the 1974–75 season, Hankin missed only five matches in the First Division, and scored 14 goals. A match against Leeds United in September 1974 was particularly eventful. With the scores tied, Hankin was fouled while jumping to head a crossed ball and Leighton James converted the resulting penalty for what proved to be the winning goal. Hankin himself did not see out the win. He and Leeds defender Gordon McQueen had both already been booked when Hankin took hold of his opponent's shirt "like a page boy clutching a bride's train"; McQueen turned round and hit him, and both were sent off. Hankin's football was not restricted to his club. In October, while still only 18, he was included in the England under-23 squad for a European Championship qualifier against Czechoslovakia. England won 3–0, and Hankin made his debut as a substitute. He made two more appearances for the under-23s that season, both in friendlies. He was also a member of Don Revie's All Stars XI that played a charity match against a West Midlands XI managed by Joe Mercer in aid of those affected by the Birmingham pub bombings.

Third in the table in January 1975, Burnley finished the season in mid-table, and despite Hankin's 13 goals, were relegated back to the Second Division in at the end of the 1975–76 campaign. Hankin began the new season still at the club, but was available for transfer. In September 1976, the injury-hit West Ham United agreed a fee of £200,000 for the player; he turned them down, because he and his wife would be uncomfortable in London. A move to Leeds United – 1973–74 Football League champions and 1975 European Cup Finalists – was agreed, but the medical revealed knee problems that required further investigation and possible surgery. Amid reported interest from Middlesbrough, Leeds were convinced that the injury "would have no long-term complications", and the move went ahead, for a fee of £172,000.

=== Leeds United ===
The injury delayed Hankin's debut for Leeds until 6 November, when he started in a 2–0 win over Everton at Goodison Park. He made three more appearances without scoring (plus a fourth, against Bristol City at Ashton Gate, in a match abandoned because of fog) before his knee problems returned. Towards the end of the season he underwent surgery, and regained fitness in time to join in pre-season training. He scored five goals in his first five matches, and two weeks later, against Manchester United, produced "a display of aerial ability throughout that must put him along the game's great headers of a ball". The Guardian's reporter still had concerns that he and Joe Jordan needed to establish as close a relationship as existed between Mick Jones and Allan Clarke in Leeds' title-winning days. Hankin himself relished playing alongside Jordan, but lost him to Manchester United halfway through the season; before Jordan's departure, Hankin had 14 league goals, but produced only 6 in the remainder of the campaign. The total of 20 still made him Leeds' top scorer by some distance. Hankin was selected for the England under-21 squad for the 1978 European Championship quarter-final second leg match against Italy in April, but had to withdraw through injury.

Playing alongside new signing John Hawley, Hankin contributed 9 goals from 30 league appearances in 1978–79 to help Leeds finish fifth and qualify for the UEFA Cup. In March 1979, he was suspended for two weeks by manager Jimmy Adamson for an unspecified breach of club discipline; Hankin said later that it was for missing treatment to an injury. Early in the new season, Hawley was sold and Hankin submitted a transfer request, which was turned down by Leeds' board: Adamson said he was too valuable a player to lose. In hopes of a move abroad, Hankin declared himself an admirer of "Continental methods and their style" before submitting a second request in October – also rejected – before being made available for transfer some six weeks later. His form had dipped, and by March 1980, when he finally left the club, he had scored only three league goals and one in the UEFA Cup.

=== Vancouver Whitecaps ===
There were offers from First Division clubs for Hankin's services, but he signed for North American Soccer League (NASL) club Vancouver Whitecaps – the reigning Soccer Bowl champions – for a fee of £300,000. The team was managed by Tony Waiters, who had been in charge of the England youths at the 1973 European Championships, and Hankin's Leeds teammate David Harvey had joined a few days earlier. Hankin registered 8 goals and an assist from 24 matches in his first season, but the club itself was unsettled. The second season, with Waiters gone and another ex-Leeds man, Johnny Giles, in charge, things were different. Although The Irish Times thought some members of the team that played pre-season friendlies in Ireland, Hankin included, needed to "shed a bit of weight before the real competitive season gets under way", the Whitecaps won their division, but failed in the playoffs. According to Hankin, whose personal return rose to 12 goals and 8 assists from 22 matches, "we were the best team in the NASL, but we blew it."

In November 1981, First Division club Arsenal, who were struggling to score goals after the departure of Frank Stapleton, expressed an interest in signing Hankin. There was some argument about the fee – variously reported as £300,000 or £400,000 – and the deal included an agreement for him to return to Vancouver if he did not impress. Reunited with Leeds striker partner John Hawley, Hankin played twice for the first team, both times as a substitute in the League Cup against Liverpool, but no permanent move ensued. He attributed that to the economic problems then current in English football. Before returning to Canada for one last season with the Whitecaps, Hankin made a few appearances for Shamrock Rovers under Johnny Giles, who combined coaching the Whitecaps with managing the League of Ireland club. He scored the only goal of the match at Sligo Rovers on his debut, as well as missing from six yards "when it looked so much easier to score."

=== Later Football League career ===
After the 1982 NASL season finished, Hankin returned to England to sign for Middlesbrough, bottom of the Second Division, on a two-year deal for a fee of £85,000. He made his debut on 28 September against Grimsby Town: he and teammate Mick Kennedy were sent off as Middlesbrough lost 4–1. That was Bobby Murdoch's last match as Boro manager; in successor Malcolm Allison's first match in charge, a League Cup tie against Burnley, Hankin scored his first goal for the club. He was a regular in the side despite a lack of goals, but fell out of favour towards the end of the season and made his final appearance as a substitute against Leicester City on 5 April 1983. He received a two-match ban for reaching 41 disciplinary points, and was transfer-listed at the end of the season. He had scored just once in 21 league matches.

Hankin moved on to Fourth Division club Peterborough United for a "small fee" in early September. He scored twice on his debut, and continued to score at a rate of one every four matches, but his disciplinary problems increased. He was sent off four times during the 1983–84 season, and was warned by the club on several occasions as to his future conduct. Injury meant Hankin missed the first half of the 1984–85 season, but when, eight matches into his return to the team, he was sent off for a fifth time, the club cancelled his contract with immediate effect. Hankin himself said he was targeted by opponents because of his reputation.

Within days, he signed for Second Division club Wolverhampton Wanderers – manager Tommy Docherty told him it was his last chance in football – but in the eleven matches he played for them was unable to make enough difference to prevent their relegation. When he returned for the new season overweight, Wolves cancelled his contract.

=== Non-League career ===
Hankin moved into non-league football, signing for Northern League club Whitby Town in October 1985. Under the management of former Leeds and Whitecaps teammate David Harvey, he scored 9 goals from 32 appearances in his first season, and "helped to bring the best out of players around him, whilst still knocking goals home himself." He scored the goal that took Whitby into the second round proper of the 1985–86 FA Cup, and the following season helped the club reach the first round.

He moved on to another Northern League club, Newcastle Blue Star, and then a third, Guisborough Town, for whom he scored 26 goals from 82 appearances. While captaining Guisborough in the first round of the 1988–89 FA Cup against Football League club Bury in a match switched to Middlesbrough's Ayresome Park ground, Hankin was involved in a bizarre incident. The referee instructed the captains to wear armbands, but Guisborough did not have such a thing in their kit. According to the club's secretary, there was no such requirement under FA Cup rules. After Hankin used and then discarded a wristband because it was too tight, the referee booked him for not wearing his armband, and then sent him off for using "foul and abusive language" when he argued. The matter was raised in Parliament by the local MP, Richard Holt, who took advantage of parliamentary privilege to assert that the team were "cheated by a biased referee" who should have been "hounded out of the ground."

Hankin took over as manager of Northallerton Town in March 1989. He led them to promotion from the Northern League Second Division in 1989–90 and a mid-table finish the following season before resigning at the end of that campaign. He was credited by the club's then chairman with "introduc[ing] professional attitudes" on which his successor could build. He then joined Darlington as youth-team coach under the management of his former Leeds teammate Frank Gray, and spent the last few weeks of the 1991–92 season as caretaker manager after Gray was sacked, but was unable to prevent their relegation to the Fourth Division. It emerged later that "reckless contracts" meant that not only Gray and Hankin but three other managers were on the financially struggling club's payroll long after their departures.

=== Later life ===
Hankin worked in Newcastle United's Football in the Community scheme for several years, latterly as director, until he was made redundant in 2008. He took the club to an industrial tribunal, alleging unfair dismissal, but reached a settlement just before the hearing. He then left the game, and went on to work with adults with special needs.

== Style of play ==
Hankin's playing career was marred by his disciplinary record, with a significant number of red cards awarded.

== Career statistics ==
Appearances and goals by club, season and competition
Club	Season	League			National Cup		League Cup		Other		Total	
Club	Season	Division	Apps	Goals	Apps	Goals	Apps	Goals	Apps	Goals	Apps	Goals
Burnley	1972–73	Second Division	1	0	0	0	0	0	—		1	0
Burnley	1973–74	First Division	34	8	4	2	3	2	6 (Note: Appearances in Texaco Cup)	4	47	16
Burnley	1974–75	First Division	37	14	1	0	3	1	—		41	15
Burnley	1975–76	First Division	34	13	1	0	5	1	—		40	14
Burnley	1976–77	Second Division	6	2	—		1	0	3 (Note: Appearances in Anglo-Scottish Cup)	0	10	0
Burnley	Total		112	37	6	2	12	4	9	4	139	47
Leeds United	1976–77	First Division	4	0	0	0	—		—		4	0
Leeds United	1977–78	First Division	33	20	1	0	6	1	—		40	21
Leeds United	1978–79	First Division	30	9	0	0	8	2	—		38	11
Leeds United	1979–80	First Division	16	3	0	0	1	0	4 (Note: Appearances in UEFA Cup)	1	21	4
Leeds United	Total		83	32	1	0	15	3	4	1	103	36
Vancouver Whitecaps	1980	NASL	24	8	—		—		2 (Note: Appearances in NASL playoffs)	1	26	9
Vancouver Whitecaps	1981	NASL	22	12	—		—		2	0	24	12
Vancouver Whitecaps	Total		46	20	—		—		4	1	50	21
Arsenal	1981–82	First Division	0	0	0	0	2	0	—		2	0
Vancouver Whitecaps	1982	NASL	27	11	—		—		3	1	30	12
Middlesbrough	1982–83	Second Division	21	1	3	1	2	1	—		26	3
Middlesbrough	1983–84	Second Division	0	0	—		0	0	—		0	0
Middlesbrough	Total		21	1	3	1	2	1	—		26	3
Peterborough United	1983–84	Fourth Division	27	(Note: Up The Posh gives Hankin 7 league goals in 1983–84 and none in 1984–85, but all other sources, including Hugman, Sporting Heroes, and Neil Brown, give 8 league goals in total.)	0	0	3	1	0	0	30	
Peterborough United	1984–85	Fourth Division	6		0	0	0	0	2 (Note: Appearances in Associate Members Cup)	0	8	
Peterborough United	Total		33	8	0	0	3	1	2	0	38	9
Wolverhampton Wanderers	1984–85	Second Division	10	1	—		—		—		10	1
Career total			332	110	10	3	34	9	22	7	398	129

== Managerial statistics ==
Team	From	To	Record					Ref
Team	From	To	P	W	D	L	Win %	Ref
Darlington	24 February 1992	End of season	15	2	3	10	13.3	

== Honours ==
England youth

- European Under-18 Championship: 1973

Burnley

- Texaco Cup runner-up: 1974

Vancouver Whitecaps

- NASL Northwest Division: 1981
