= Ariss =

Ariss may refer to:

- The community of the Guelph/Eramosa township, Ontario, Canada
- The Amateur Radio on the International Space Station project
- Ariss (surname), a surname
