= 1978–79 Anglo-Scottish Cup =

Tournament details
- Country: England; Scotland
- Teams: 24

Final positions
- Champions: Burnley
- Runners-up: Oldham Athletic

The 1978–79 Anglo-Scottish Cup was the fourth edition of the tournament. It was won by Burnley, who beat Oldham Athletic in a two-legged final by 4–2 on aggregate.

== English clubs ==
=== Group stage ===
==== Group A ====
Home team	Result	Away team	Date
Preston North End	4–2	Blackpool	2 August 1978
Blackpool	0–1	Blackburn Rovers	5 August 1978
Burnley	3–2	Preston North End	5 August 1978
Burnley	3–1	Blackpool	8 August 1978
Blackburn Rovers	1–0	Preston North End	9 August 1978
Blackburn Rovers	1–1	Burnley	12 August 1978

Team	Pld	W	D	L	GF	GA	GD	BP	Pts
Burnley	3	2	1	0	7	4	+3	2	7
Blackburn Rovers	3	2	1	0	3	1	+2	0	5
Preston North End	3	1	0	2	6	6	0	1	3
Blackpool	3	0	0	3	3	8	-5	0	0

==== Group B ====
Home team	Result	Away team	Date
Oldham Athletic	1–0	Sheffield United	5 August 1978
Sunderland	2–0	Bolton Wanderers	5 August 1978
Bolton Wanderers	1–0	Sheffield United	8 August 1978
Oldham Athletic	2–1	Sunderland	8 August 1978
Bolton Wanderers	0–0	Oldham Athletic	12 August 1978
Sheffield United	2–1	Sunderland	12 August 1978

Team	Pld	W	D	L	GF	GA	GD	BP	Pts
Oldham Athletic	3	2	1	0	3	1	+2	0	5
Bolton Wanderers	3	1	1	1	1	2	-1	0	3
Sunderland	3	1	0	2	4	4	0	0	2
Sheffield United	3	1	0	2	2	3	-1	0	2

==== Group C ====
Home team	Result	Away team	Date
Bristol Rovers	1–0	Cardiff City	1 August 1978
Bristol City	6–1	Bristol Rovers	5 August 1978
Cardiff City	1–0	Fulham	5 August 1978
Bristol City	1–0	Cardiff City	8 August 1978
Fulham	2–1	Bristol Rovers	8 August 1978
Fulham	0–3	Bristol City	12 August 1978

Team	Pld	W	D	L	GF	GA	GD	BP	Pts
Bristol City	3	3	0	0	10	1	+9	2	8
Cardiff City	3	1	0	2	1	2	-1	0	2
Fulham	3	1	0	2	2	5	-3	0	2
Bristol Rovers	3	1	0	2	3	8	-5	0	2

==== Group D ====
Home team	Result	Away team	Date
Mansfield Town	1–0	Notts County	31 July 1978
Notts County	2–1	Norwich City	5 August 1978
Orient	0–1	Mansfield Town	5 August 1978
Orient	2–3	Notts County	8 August 1978
Norwich City	1–1	Mansfield Town	9 August 1978
Norwich City	0–0	Orient	12 August 1978

Team	Pld	W	D	L	GF	GA	GD	BP	Pts
Mansfield Town	3	2	1	0	3	1	+2	0	5
Notts County	3	2	0	1	5	4	+1	1	5
Norwich City	3	0	2	1	2	3	-1	0	2
Orient	3	0	1	2	2	4	-2	0	1

== Scottish clubs ==
=== First round ===
==== First leg ====
Home team	Result	Away team	Date
Celtic	2–1	Clyde	3 August 1978
Raith Rovers	1–2	Morton	5 August 1978
Motherwell	1–0	St Mirren	6 August 1978
Partick Thistle	2–1	Heart of Midlothian	16 August 1978

==== Second leg ====
Home team	Result	Away team	Date
Clyde	1–6	Celtic	5 August 1978
Morton	4–1	Raith Rovers	8 August 1978
St Mirren	3–0	Motherwell	9 August 1978
Heart of Midlothian	0–1	Partick Thistle	23 August 1978

== Quarter-finals ==
=== First leg ===
Home team	Result	Away team	Date
Bristol City	1–2	St Mirren	12 September 1978
Burnley	1–0	Celtic	12 September 1978
Morton	3–0	Oldham Athletic	13 September 1978
Partick Thistle	1–0	Mansfield Town	13 September 1978

=== Second leg ===
Home team	Result	Away team	Date
Oldham Athletic	4–0	Morton	26 September 1978
St Mirren	2–2	Bristol City	26 September 1978
Celtic	1–2	Burnley	27 September 1978
Mansfield Town	3–2	Partick Thistle	3 October 1978

== Semi-finals ==
=== First leg ===
Home team	Result	Away team	Date
Oldham Athletic	1–1	St Mirren	17 October 1978
Mansfield Town	1–2	Burnley	31 October 1978

=== Second leg ===
Home team	Result	Away team	Date
St Mirren	1–1	Oldham Athletic	31 October 1978
Burnley	0–1 (8–7 p.)	Mansfield Town	7 November 1978

== Final ==
=== First leg ===
5 December 1978
19:30 BST

Oldham Athletic	1–4	Burnley
Young 86'		Kindon 1', 75'; Noble 3'; Thomson 67'

Boundary Park, Oldham
Attendance: 10,456

=== Second leg ===
12 December 1978
19:30 BST

Burnley	0–1	Oldham Athletic
		Steel 41

Turf Moor, Burnley
Attendance: 10,865

== Notes and references ==
Specific

General

- "Anglo-Scottish Cup 1978/1979". Football Club History Database.
