= Colin Waldron =

English footballer

Personal information
- Date of birth: 22 June 1948 (age 78)
- Place of birth: Bristol, England
- Height: 6 ft 0 in (1.83 m)
- Position: Defender

Senior career*
Years	Team	Apps	(Gls)
1966–1967	Bury	20	(1)
1967	Chelsea	9	(0)
1967–1976	Burnley	308	(16)
1976	Manchester United	3	(0)
1976–1978	Sunderland	20	(1)
1978	Tulsa Roughnecks	11	(1)
1978	Philadelphia Fury	16	(1)
1978	→ Mossley (loan)	1	(0)
1979	Atlanta Chiefs	14	(0)
1979–1980	Rochdale	19	(1)
Total		420	(21)
- * Club domestic league appearances and goals

Colin Waldron (born 22 June 1948) is an English former football defender. He spent thirteen seasons in the Football League and two in the North American Soccer League.

Waldron spent his youth in Oldham, Lancashire, beginning his career with nearby Bury, making 20 appearances. He then joined Chelsea before the 1967–68 season. Nine games into the season, Burnley purchased his contract for £30,000. He made his Burnley debut on 28 October 1967. He quickly became a fixture at centre back and was named captain in his second season with the club. Burnley won the Second Division in 1973 and were invited to play in the 1973 FA Charity Shield in which Waldron scored the winning goal against Manchester City. He ultimately played nine years and 308 games for Burnley before club turmoil in 1976 led the team to release the manager Jimmy Adamson and several players including Waldron. He then moved to Manchester United, for whom he made just three appearances before the Adamson-managed Sunderland purchased his contract. After two years with Sunderland, Waldron moved to the United States to play for the Tulsa Roughnecks. After spells with the Philadelphia Fury and Atlanta Chiefs, he moved back to England to play for Rochdale.
