= 1970–71 Everton F.C. season =

English football club season

Everton
1970–71 season
- Manager: Harry Catterick
- Ground: Goodison Park
- First Division: 14th
- FA Cup: Semi-Final
- European Cup: Quarter-Final
- FA Charity Shield: Winners
- Top goalscorer: League: Joe Royle (17); All: Joe Royle (23)
Home colours	Away colours

During the 1970–71 English football season, Everton F.C. competed in the Football League First Division. They finished 14th in the table with 37 points.

== Final league table ==
Pos	Team	Pld	W	D	L	GF	GA	GAv	Pts
12	Newcastle United	42	14	13	15	44	46	0.957	41
13	Stoke City	42	12	13	17	44	48	0.917	37
14	Everton	42	12	13	17	54	60	0.900	37
15	Huddersfield Town	42	11	14	17	40	49	0.816	36
16	Nottingham Forest	42	14	8	20	42	61	0.689	36

Source: World Football
Rules for classification: 1) Points; 2) Goal average; 3) Goals scored

== Results ==
Win	Draw	Loss

=== Charity Shield ===
Date	Opponent	Venue	Result	Attendance	Scorers
8 August 1970	Chelsea	A	2–1	43,547	Whittle 37', Kendall 54'

=== Football League First Division ===
Date	Opponent	Venue	Result	Attendance	Scorers
15 August 1970	Arsenal	H	2–2	50,248	Royle 28', Morrissey 84'
18 August 1970	Burnley	H	1–1	44,717	Morrissey 54'
22 August 1970	Leeds United	A	2–3	46,718	Brown 30', Husband 44'
26 August 1970	Chelsea	A	2–2	48,195	Husband 20', Royle 41'
29 August 1970	Manchester City	H	0–1	50,724	
2 September 1970	Manchester United	A	0–2	49,599	
5 September 1970	West Ham United	A	2–1	29,171	Royle 31', Husband 40'
12 September 1970	Ipswich Town	H	2–0	41,596	Whittle 43', Kendall 62'
19 September 1970	Blackpool	A	2–0	30,705	Morrissey 44', Husband 48'
26 September 1970	Crystal Palace	H	3–1	43,443	Morrissey 27', Harvey 37', Royle 42'
3 October 1970	Coventry City	A	1–3	29,212	Hurst 26'
10 October 1970	Derby County	H	1–1	46,614	Morrissey 23'
17 October 1970	Arsenal	A	0–4	50,053	
24 October 1970	Newcastle United	H	3–1	43,135	Royle 29', Whittle 35', Kendall 52'
31 October 1970	West Bromwich Albion	A	0–3	31,628	
7 November 1970	Nottingham Forest	H	1–0	39,255	Whittle 74'
14 November 1970	Stoke City	A	1–1	26,765	Hurst 67'
21 November 1970	Liverpool	A	2–3	53,777	Whittle 56', Royle 63'
28 November 1970	Tottenham Hotspur	H	0–0	44,301	
5 December 1970	Huddersfield Town	A	1–1	27,658	Ball 27'
12 December 1970	Southampton	H	4–1	31,139	Royle 27', 74', Whittle 61', Morrissey 68'
19 December 1970	Leeds United	H	0–1	47,393	
26 December 1970	Wolverhampton Wanderers	A	0–2	30,178	
9 January 1971	Burnley	A	2–2	17,512	Newton 52', Johnson 56'
16 January 1971	Chelsea	H	3–0	43,628	Husband 10', Newton 35', Royle 85'
30 January 1971	Tottenham Hotspur	A	1–2	42,105	Royle 45'
6 February 1971	Huddersfield Town	H	2–1	37,213	Royle 10', 73'
16 February 1971	Southampton	A	2–2	22,183	Harvey 11', Wright 88'
20 February 1971	Liverpool	H	0–0	56,846	
23 February 1971	Manchester United	H	1–0	52,544	Wright 21'
27 February 1971	West Bromwich Albion	H	3–3	36,940	Husband 18', Royle 21', Newton 29'
13 March 1971	Stoke City	H	2–0	38,924	Whittle 50', Royle 74'
17 March 1971	Newcastle United	A	1–2	22,874	Royle 64'
20 March 1971	Nottingham Forest	A	2–3	21,643	Hurst 15, Lyons 87'
30 March 1971	West Ham United	H	0–1	29,094	
3 April 1971	Manchester City	A	0–3	26,885	
6 April 1971	Ipswich Town	A	0–0	20,288	
10 April 1971	Wolverhampton Wanderers	H	1–2	35,294	Newton 21'
12 April 1971	Coventry City	H	3–0	24,371	Royle 12', 23', Ball 47'
17 April 1971	Derby County	A	1–3	28,793	Whittle 75'
24 April 1971	Blackpool	H	0–0	26,286	
1 May 1971	Crystal Palace	A	0–2	21,590	

=== FA Cup ===
Round	Date	Opponent	Venue	Result	Attendance	Goalscorers
3	2 January 1971	Blackburn Rovers	H	2–0	40,471	Husband 19', 44'
4	23 February 1971	Middlesbrough	H	3–0	54,857	Newton 30', Harvey 45', Royle 71'
5	13 February 1971	Derby County	H	1–0	53,490	Johnson 43'
6	6 March 1971	Colchester United	H	5–0	53,028	Kendall 23', 32',Royle 33', Husband 36', Ball 85'
SF	27 March 1971	Liverpool	N	1–2	62,144	Ball 11'
3rd	7 May 1971	Stoke City	N	2–3	5,031	Whittle 8', Ball 18'

=== European Cup ===
Round	Date	Opponent	Venue	Result	Attendance	Goalscorers
2:1	16 September 1970	(Iceland) Keflavík	H	6–2	28,444	Ball 39', 58', 67', Royle 51', 70', Kendall 41'
2:2	30 September 1970	(Iceland) Keflavík	A	3–0	9,546	Royle 38', 46', Whittle 32'
3:1	21 October 1970	(West Germany) Borussia Mönchengladbach	A	1–1	29,340	Kendall 47'
3:2	4 November 1970	(West Germany) Borussia Mönchengladbach	H	1–1 (aet, Everton won 4–3 on penalties)	42,744	Morrissey 1'
QF:1	9 March 1971	(Greece) Panathinaikos	H	1–1	46,047	Johnson 90'
QF:2	24 March 1971	(Greece) Panathinaikos	A	0–0	25,000	
