= Paul Bradshaw (footballer, born 1953) =

English footballer (1953–2026)

Personal information
- Date of birth: 2 October 1953
- Place of birth: Sheffield, England
- Date of death: 2 August 2026 (aged 72)
- Position: Winger

Senior career*
Years	Team	Apps	(Gls)
1970–1976	Burnley	13	(2)
1976–1978	Sheffield Wednesday	64	(9)
Total		77	(11)

International career
1969	England Schoolboys	2	(1)
1971–1972	England Youth	9	(2)
- * Club domestic league appearances and goals

Paul Bradshaw (2 October 1953 – 2 August 2026) was an English professional footballer who played as a winger. He started his career with Burnley, where he spent more than six years prior to joining Sheffield Wednesday in 1976. Bradshaw made a total of 91 senior appearances before being forced to retire from football in 1978 through injury.

== Career ==
Born in Sheffield, Bradshaw represented both the Sheffield and Yorkshire Schoolboys teams as a youngster before going on to play for England at the same level. In 1969, he joined Football League First Division side Burnley as an apprentice and went on to sign his first professional contract with the club on his seventeenth birthday, although he played solely for the reserve team during his first two seasons in Lancashire. Bradshaw was selected in the England squad for the 1972 UEFA European Under-18 Football Championship and appeared in all five of his country's matches as the team won the tournament, beating West Germany 2–0 in the final. He made his first-team debut for Burnley in the Watney Cup tie against Bristol Rovers on 2 August of the same year. It was almost three years before Bradshaw made another appearance for the senior side; he made his league debut in the 3–3 draw with Arsenal on 22 March 1975, coming on as a substitute for Brian Flynn.

Following the sale of Leighton James to Derby County in November 1975, Bradshaw was drafted into the first team. He made nine appearances but when manager Jimmy Adamson was replaced by Joe Brown two months later, he was dropped in favour of Colin Morris. Bradshaw started the 1976–77 campaign as first-choice and scored two goals in three matches before again being dropped for new signing Tony Morley. In September 1976 he transferred to his hometown club Sheffield Wednesday for a fee of £20,000. He scored on his debut in a 2–2 draw with Wrexham and quickly became a regular starter at Hillsborough and went on to net seven goals in 37 league appearances during the remainder of the season. Bradshaw kept his place in the team throughout the 1977–78 campaign, playing 35 games in all competitions. However, he then suffered an injury which led him to retire from professional football at the age of 25 in October 1978. He later worked as a physical education teacher in a secondary school in Sheffield.

== Death ==
Bradshaw died on 2 August 2026, aged 72.

== Career statistics ==
Appearances and goals by club, season and competition
Club	Season	League			FA Cup		League Cup		Watney Cup		Total	
Club	Season	Division	Apps	Goals	Apps	Goals	Apps	Goals	Apps	Goals	Apps	Goals
Burnley	1972–73	Second Division	0	0	0	0	0	0	1	0	1	0
Burnley	1973–74	First Division	0	0	0	0	0	0	0	0	0	0
Burnley	1974–75	First Division	1	0	0	0	0	0	0	0	1	0
Burnley	1975–76	First Division	9	0	1	0	1	0	0	0	11	0
Burnley	1976–77	Second Division	3	2	0	0	1	0	0	0	4	2
Burnley	Total		13	2	1	0	2	0	1	0	17	2
Sheffield Wednesday	1976–77	Third Division	37	7	2	0	0	0	0	0	39	7
Sheffield Wednesday	1977–78	Third Division	27	2	2	0	6	2	0	0	35	4
Sheffield Wednesday	Total		64	9	4	0	6	2	0	0	74	11
Career total			77	11	5	0	8	2	1	0	91	13
