= Steve McAdam =

Footballer from Northern Ireland

Personal information
- Full name: Steven McAdam
- Date of birth: 2 April 1960
- Place of birth: Portadown, Northern Ireland
- Date of death: 21 February 2004 (aged 43)
- Place of death: Donaghadee, Northern Ireland
- Position: Full back

Senior career*
Years	Team	Apps	(Gls)
1978–1980	Burnley	5	(0)
1980	Oldham Athletic	0	(0)
1980	Barnsley	0	(0)
1980–1981	Wigan Athletic	26	(0)
	EPA Larnaca	?	(?)
- * Club domestic league appearances and goals

Steven "Steve" McAdam (2 April 1960 – 21 February 2004) was a professional footballer from Northern Ireland, who played as a full-back.
