= Andrew Stephen =

Sir Andrew Stephen (20 May 1906 – 25 February 1980) was a Scottish physician who was chairman of Sheffield Wednesday F.C. and the Football Association. He was born to a family of tenant farmers near Aberdeen. He trained as a doctor at the University of Aberdeen's School of Medicine and qualified in 1928. Two years later Stephen moved to Sheffield to become a General Practitioner. In 1946 he joined Sheffield Wednesday as their medical officer. Four years later he joined the club's board and in 1956 became chairman. From 1958 he also held the post of the club's representative to the British Association of Sport and Medicine

In January 1967, whilst still chairman of The Owls, Stephen became the first Scottish person to be elected as chairman of the Football Association. He was knighted in the 1972 Birthday Honours. The following year he stepped down as chairman of Sheffield Wednesday, although he carried on his roles of club representative to the BASM and as chairman of the FA until the end of the 1975-76 season. He remained a member of FIFA's Medical Committee until his death.

Stephen died at the Royal Hallamshire Hospital, Sheffield on 25 February 1980 at the age of 73, leaving behind his wife and three sons.
