= Bob Higgins (footballer) =

English footballer

Personal information
- Full name: Robert James Higgins
- Date of birth: 23 December 1958 (age 67)
- Place of birth: Bolsover, England
- Position: Central defender

Senior career*
Years	Team	Apps	(Gls)
1976–1980	Burnley	3	(0)
1979	→ Hartlepool United (loan)	2	(0)
1980–1981	Rochdale	5	(0)
	Morecambe	?	(?)
- * Club domestic league appearances and goals

Robert James Higgins is an English former professional footballer who played as a central defender.
