= Jeff Tate (footballer) =

English footballer

Personal information
- Full name: Jeffrey Tate
- Date of birth: 17 November 1959 (age 66)
- Place of birth: Blyth, England
- Position: Midfielder

Youth career
- Wallsend Boys Club

Senior career*
Years	Team	Apps	(Gls)
1978–1980	Burnley	5	(1)
- Morecambe
- * Club domestic league appearances and goals

Jeffrey Tate (born 17 November 1959) is an English former professional footballer who played as a central midfielder. He played five matches in the Football League for Burnley. Also playing for Wallsend Boys Club, England schoolboys, Morecambe FC, Mossley FC and finished his career at West Didsbury & Chorlton.
