= Len Richley =

English footballer and manager

Personal information
- Full name: Lionel Richley
- Date of birth: 2 July 1924
- Place of birth: Gateshead, England
- Date of death: 1980
- Position: Wing half

Senior career*
Years	Team	Apps	(Gls)
–	Tonbridge		
–	Crystal Palace	0	(0)
1951–1954	Hartlepools United	72	(0)
1955–1959	Holbeach United		

Managerial career
- 1955–1959: Holbeach United (player-manager)
- 1959–1965: King's Lynn
- 1968–1970: Rochdale
- 1970–1971: Darlington
- * Club domestic league appearances and goals

Lionel "Len" Richley (2 July 1924 – 1980) was an English footballer who made 72 appearances in the Football League playing as a wing half for Hartlepools United in the 1950s. He went on to manage non-league clubs Holbeach United and King's Lynn and league clubs Rochdale and Darlington.

== Managerial statistics ==
Team	From	To	Record				
Team	From	To	P	W	D	L	Win%
Rochdale	October 1968	February 1970	69	29	19	21	42.03
Darlington	August 1970	July 1971	51	19	12	20	37.25
Total			120	48	31	41	40.00
