= Ariss (surname) =

Ariss is a surname. Notable people with the surname include:

- Bruce Ariss (1911–1994), American painter, muralist, writer, illustrator, editor, set designer, playwright, and actor
- John Ariss (1725–1799), American architect

== See also ==
- Arins
