= Keith Newton (footballer) =

English footballer (1941–1998)

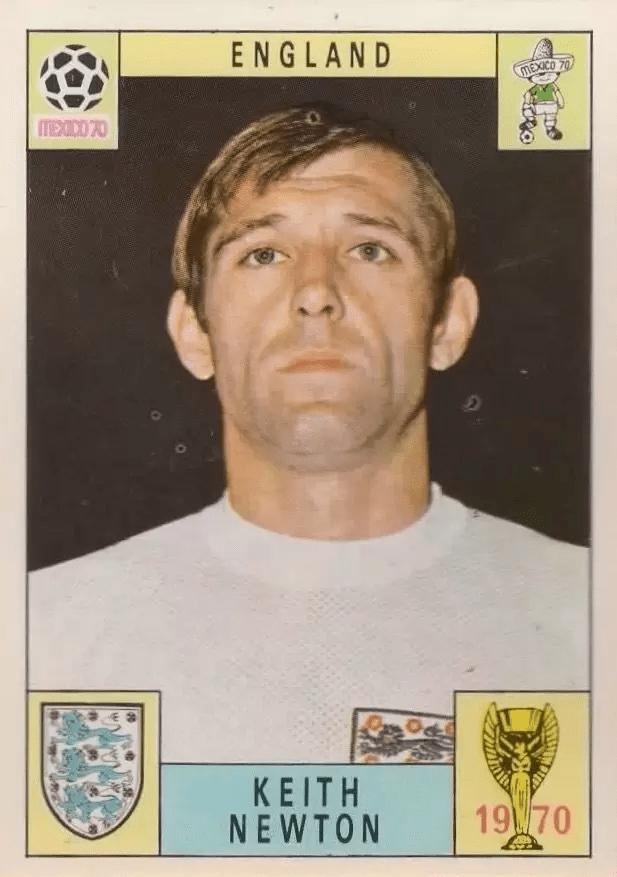
- Newton's official trading card issued by Panini for the 1970 FIFA World Cup

Personal information
- Full name: Keith Robert Newton
- Date of birth: 23 June 1941
- Place of birth: Manchester, England
- Date of death: 16 June 1998 (aged 56)
- Place of death: Blackburn, England
- Height: 5 ft 11 in (1.80 m)
- Position: Full-back

Senior career*
Years	Team	Apps	(Gls)
1958–1969	Blackburn Rovers	306	(9)
1969–1972	Everton	49	(1)
1972–1978	Burnley	209	(5)
1978–1979	Morecambe		
Total		564	(15)

International career
1966–1970	England	27	(0)
Medal record
Men's football
Representing England
UEFA European Championship
Third place	1968 Italy
- * Club domestic league appearances and goals

Keith Robert Newton (23 June 1941 – 16 June 1998) was an English professional footballer who played as a full-back in The Football League in the 1960s and 1970s. He made 27 appearances for the England national team.

== Club career ==
Newton was born in Manchester. He started his career with Blackburn Rovers, initially as an amateur before signing his first professional contract with the club in October 1958. He won the FA Youth Cup with the club in 1959. and first played a League game in the 1960–61 season. Newton went on to play over 300 games for the club.

He transferred to Everton in December 1969 for £100,000, which was a record for a defender at the time, and made 12 appearances for them in the latter half of the 1969–70 season, in which Everton won the Football League First Division.

Newton moved to Burnley for the 1972–73 season, making his league debut on 12 August 1972 against Carlisle United. He made a total of 209 league appearances for Burnley, his last coming in the 1977–78 season.

== International career ==
Newton made his international debut for England against West Germany in February 1966. He went on to play 27 times for England, including three games at the 1970 World Cup Finals, where, through injury, he gained the distinction of becoming the first England player to be substituted at a World Cup, being replaced by Tommy Wright six minutes into the second half of England's opening match against Romania in Guadalajara. Newton also assisted in both England goals in the Quarter-Final defeat to West Germany.

== Personal life ==
Newton, who lived latterly at Wilpshire near Blackburn, had trained as an engineer after attending Didsbury Technical School in Manchester. He later ran a newsagents in Blackburn and was then employed as a sales executive by two motor dealerships in the same town. He died of cancer aged 56 at Blackburn Hospice in June 1998. He left a widow Barbara and one son.

== Career statistics ==
=== Club ===
Appearances and goals by club, season and competition
Club	Season	League			FA Cup		League Cup		Other		Total	
Club	Season	Division	Apps	Goals	Apps	Goals	Apps	Goals	Apps	Goals	Apps	Goals
Blackburn Rovers	1960–61	First Division	8	0	0	0	1	0	—		9	0
Blackburn Rovers	1961–62	First Division	41	0	5	0	8	0	—		54	0
Blackburn Rovers	1962–63	First Division	41	0	2	0	5	0	—		48	0
Blackburn Rovers	1963–64	First Division	31	0	2	0	1	0	—		34	0
Blackburn Rovers	1964–65	First Division	37	1	2	0	3	0	—		42	1
Blackburn Rovers	1965–66	First Division	32	1	6	0	1	0	—		39	1
Blackburn Rovers	1966–67	Second Division	33	1	1	0	2	1	—		36	2
Blackburn Rovers	1967–68	Second Division	34	4	1	0	3	0	—		38	4
Blackburn Rovers	1968–69	Second Division	32	1	2	0	3	0	—		37	1
Blackburn Rovers	1969–70	Second Division	17	1	0	0	3	0	—		20	1
Blackburn Rovers	Total		306	9	21	0	30	1	0	0	357	10
Everton	1969–70	First Division	12	0	1	0	0	0	—		13	0
Everton	1970–71	First Division	22	1	1	0	0	0	6 (Note: Appearance(s) in European Cup)	0	29	1
Everton	1971–72	First Division	15	0	0	0	1	0	—		16	0
Everton	Total		49	1	2	0	1	0	6	0	58	1
Burnley	1972–73	Second Division	42	1	2	0	1	0	2 (Note: Appearance(s) in Watney Cup)	0	47	1
Burnley	1973–74	First Division	39	1	5	0	2	0	8 (Note: One appearance in 1973 FA Charity Shield, seven appearances in Texaco Cup)	0	54	1
Burnley	1974–75	First Division	39	1	1	0	3	1	—		43	2
Burnley	1975–76	First Division	41	2	1	0	4	0	—		46	2
Burnley	1976–77	Second Division	30	1	3	0	1	0	3 (Note: Appearance(s) in Anglo-Scottish Cup)	0	37	1
Burnley	1977–78	Second Division	18	0	1	0	3	0	3	0	25	0
Burnley	Total		209	5	13	1	14	1	16	0	252	7
Career total			564	15	36	1	45	2	22	0	667	18

=== International ===
Appearances and goals by national team and year
National team	Year	Apps	Goals
England	1966	2	0
England	1967	3	0
England	1968	7	0
England	1969	7	0
England	1970	8	0
Total		27	0

== Honours ==
Blackburn Rovers

- FA Youth Cup: 1958–59

Everton

- First Division: 1969–70
- FA Charity Shield: 1970

Burnley

- FA Charity Shield: 1973
- Second Division: 1972–73

England

- UEFA European Championship third place: 1968
