= Joe Brown (footballer, born 1929) =

English footballer and manager (1929–2014)

Personal information
- Full name: Joseph Brown
- Date of birth: 26 April 1929
- Place of birth: Cramlington, England
- Date of death: 30 October 2014 (aged 85)
- Place of death: Burnley, England
- Position: Left half

Senior career*
Years	Team	Apps	(Gls)
1946–1952	Middlesbrough	11	(0)
1952–1954	Burnley	6	(0)
1954–1960	Bournemouth & Boscombe Athletic	215	(5)
1960	Aldershot	5	(0)

Managerial career
- 1976–1977: Burnley
- * Club domestic league appearances and goals

Joseph Brown (26 April 1929 – 30 October 2014) was an English football player and manager.

== Playing career ==
Brown started his career with First Division Middlesbrough, where he came through from the juniors team. He joined Burnley in August 1952, but his time at the club was restricted to just six appearances because of a serious back injury. Having suffered a slipped disc in his back at the age of 17, he recovered after the operation and salvaged his playing career. He joined Bournemouth & Boscombe Athletic in June 1954, where he made a total of 215 appearances and scored five goals in the league. He moved in July 1960 to play for Aldershot.

== Managerial career ==
Brown re-joined Burnley as a coach in 1961 and was in charge of the Burnley team that won the FA Youth Cup in 1968. Almost two years later, he became first team coach when Jimmy Adamson took over as manager. Brown became manager of Burnley in January 1976, but lost his job in February 1977. Despite being offered another job at the club, he decided to leave. He joined Manchester United where he worked with the youth set-up. He eventually retired and lived in the Burnley area.

== Personal life ==
Brown was born in Cramlington, England. He died on 30 October 2014 in Burnley, following a long illness, at the age of 85.

== Managerial statistics ==
Team	From	To	Record				
Team	From	To	G	W	L	D	Win %
Burnley	7 January 1976	20 February 1977	52	11	16	25	21.15
