= David Loggie =

English footballer

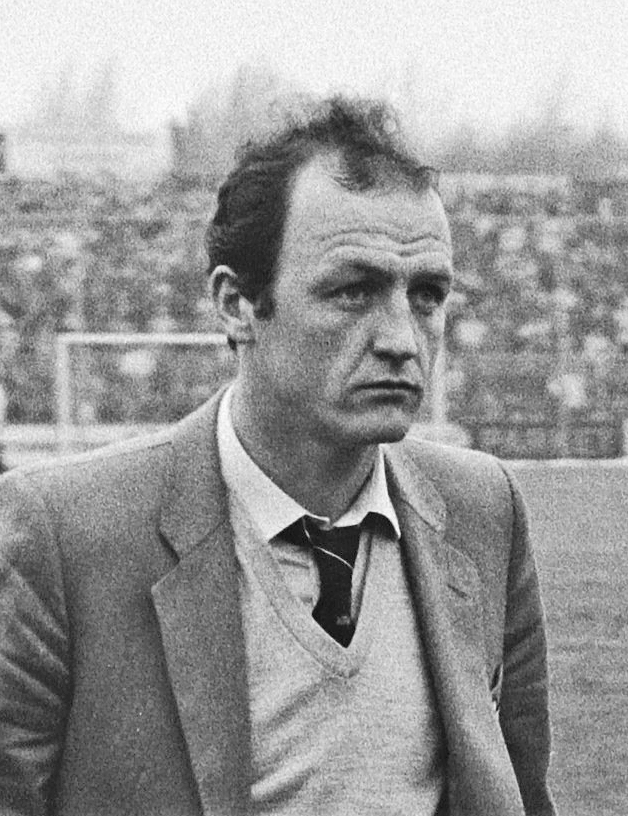

Personal information
- Full name: David McKie Loggie
- Date of birth: 31 May 1957 (age 69)
- Place of birth: Newbiggin-by-the-Sea, England
- Height: 1.81 m (5 ft 11 1/2 in)
- Position: Striker

Senior career*
Years	Team	Apps	(Gls)
1975–1978	Burnley	7	(0)
1978–1980	York City	50	(11)
1980–1982	Sparta Rotterdam	49	(25)
1982–1983	Lierse	30	(10)
1983–1989	AZ	127	(56)
1989–1991	Willem II	47	(18)
1991–1992	Cambuur Leeuwarden	22	(6)
1992–1993	AZ	1	(0)
- * Club domestic league appearances and goals

David McKie Loggie (born 31 May 1957) is an English retired professional footballer who played as a striker. After playing in the Football League with Burnley and York City, he had a successful career in The Netherlands and Belgium.
