= Mick Docherty =

English footballer (born 1950)

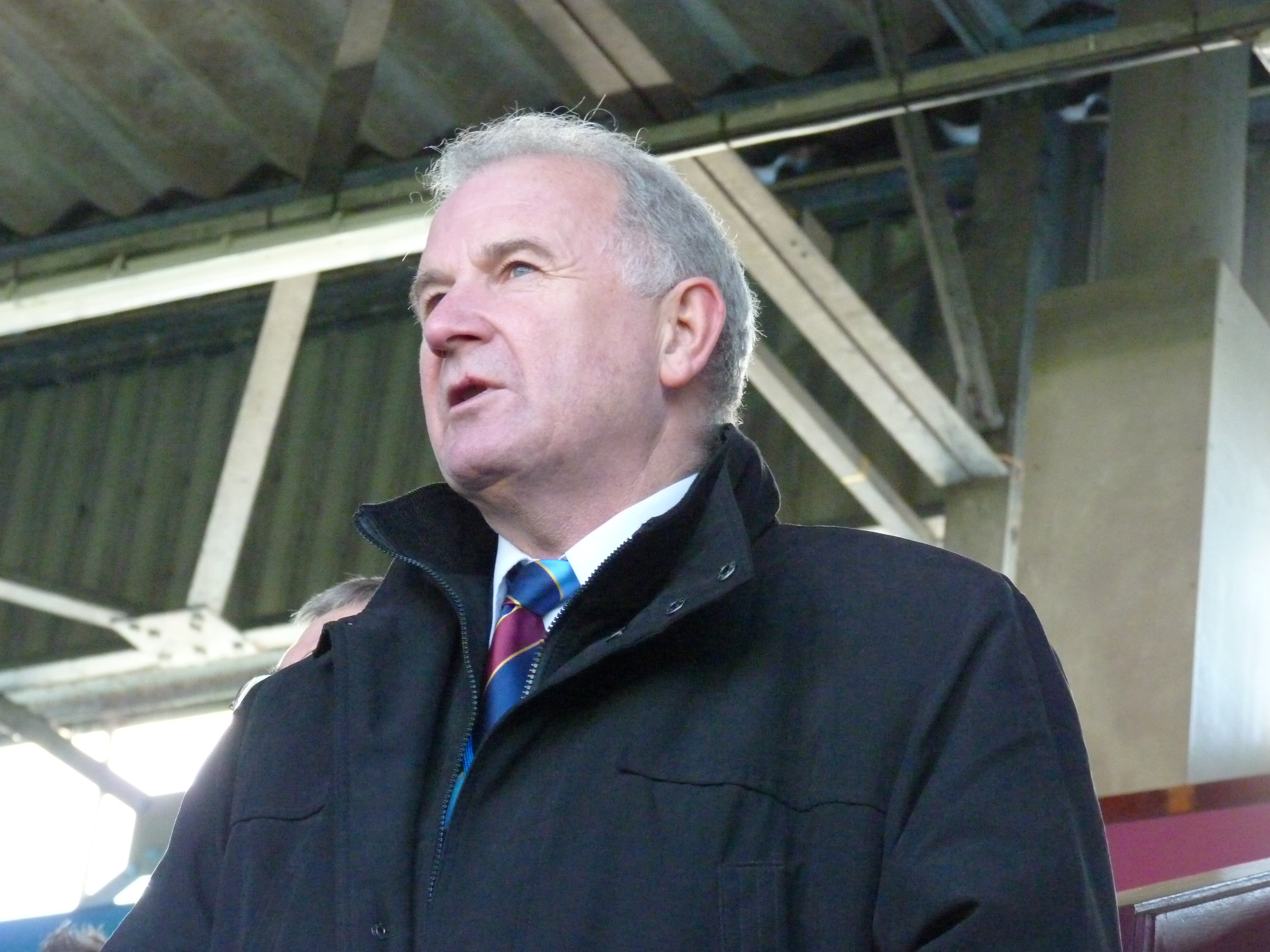

Personal information
- Full name: Michael Docherty
- Date of birth: 29 October 1950 (age 76)
- Place of birth: Preston, England
- Position: Defender

Youth career
- Chelsea

Senior career*
Years	Team	Apps	(Gls)
1968–1976	Burnley	153	(0)
1976	Manchester City	8	(0)
1976–1979	Sunderland	73	(6)
Total		234	(6)

Managerial career
- 1981: Sunderland (caretaker)
- 1983: Hartlepool United
- 1995–1996: Rochdale
- 2007: Gillingham (joint caretaker)
- * Club domestic league appearances and goals

Michael Docherty (born 29 October 1950) is an English former footballer and coach. He is the elder son of Tommy Docherty.

== Playing career ==
As a player, Docherty started his career in the youth team of Chelsea, but in 1967 he moved to Burnley. He was a full-back for Burnley, Manchester City and Sunderland, before an injury brought an early end to his playing career.

== Coaching career ==
After his retirement from playing, Docherty joined Sunderland's coaching staff. In the 1980–81 season, he took over as caretaker manager of Sunderland with four games of the season to go. He managed to save the club from relegation with a 1–0 victory over Liverpool at Anfield on the last day of the season. They finished 17th, two points clear of relegation.

Since then he has consistently managed to find work in the game, although rarely as a manager. He was briefly manager of Hartlepool United between June and December 1983, a spell chiefly noted for the signing of the ailing Ray Kennedy from Swansea City.

He later assisted Dave Sutton and succeeded him in 1994 as manager at Rochdale, accepting the job after three preferred candidates declined it. In 1994–95, he led Dale to the Northern Final of the Auto Windscreens Trophy. In his only full season in charge, 1995–96, a bright start led to an FA Cup third round match at Liverpool. Thereafter the team went into a steep decline and shortly after the end of the season, Docherty was dismissed, apparently due to alarm at some of his decisions on the retained list, and replaced by Graham Barrow. This season is well documented in the fly on the wall book Kicking In The Wind.

Docherty was coach at Burnley where he worked alongside Ronnie Jepson and Stan Ternent. He was released alongside them at the end of the 2003–04 season, but rejoined Jepson, now manager of Gillingham, as his assistant in January 2006. When Jepson resigned in September 2007, he was named as joint caretaker manager with Iffy Onuora, but Docherty left Gillingham on 8 October 2007.

On 14 May 2008, he again teamed up with Stan Ternent and Ronnie Jepson in a coaching role at Huddersfield Town. He left the club on 4 November, following Ternent's departure as manager. He now coaches at Burnley College football academy.
