= Doug Collins (footballer) =

English footballer (born 1945)

Personal information
- Full name: John Douglas Collins
- Date of birth: 28 August 1945 (age 81)
- Place of birth: Newton, Derbyshire, England
- Position: Midfielder

Senior career*
Years	Team	Apps	(Gls)
1963–1968	Grimsby Town	103	(9)
1968–1976	Burnley	187	(18)
1976–1977	Plymouth Argyle	23	(2)
1977–1978	Sunderland	6	(0)
1978–1979	Tulsa Roughnecks	5	(0)
1979	Rochdale	8	(0)

Managerial career
- 1979: Rochdale (player-manager)
- * Club domestic league appearances and goals

John Douglas Collins (born 28 August 1945) is an English former professional footballer who played as a midfielder. In 1979, he had a short spell as player-manager of Rochdale.
