= Marshall Burke =

Scottish footballer

Personal information
- Full name: Marshall Burke
- Date of birth: 26 March 1959 (age 67)
- Place of birth: Glasgow, Scotland
- Position: Midfielder

Senior career*
Years	Team	Apps	(Gls)
1977–1980	Burnley	24	(5)
1980–1981	Leeds United	0	(0)
1981–1982	Blackburn Rovers	39	(7)
1982–1984	Lincoln City	50	(7)
1984	→ Cardiff City (loan)	3	(0)
1984	Tranmere Rovers	3	(0)
1984–1986	Scarborough	56	(18)
- * Club domestic league appearances and goals

Marshall Burke (born 26 March 1959) is a Scottish former footballer.

He played for Burnley, Leeds United, Blackburn Rovers, Lincoln City, Cardiff City, Tranmere Rovers and Scarborough. He was part of the Colne Dynamoes team which won the 1987–88 FA Vase competition.

== Post-football career ==
Burke has worked for over 25 years in the brewing industry. He spent several years with Scottish & Newcastle, Chorley, before taking sales positions with Vaux Breweries in Rochdale and Boddingtons (Whitbread), Manchester. In 2000, he joined Thwaites Brewery, firstly as key accounts manager before becoming sales manager for the free trade. In November 2013 he joined Moorhouse's Brewery as sales manager where he is expected to help the company's plans for their new £4.2m cask-ale brewing complex.

== Honours ==
Lincoln City

- Football League Group Cup runner-up: 1982–83
