= Terry Cochrane =

Northern Irish footballer (born 1953)

Personal information
- Full name: George Terence Cochrane
- Date of birth: 23 January 1953 (age 73)
- Place of birth: Killyleagh, Northern Ireland
- Height: 5 ft 7 in (1.70 m)
- Position: Winger

Senior career*
Years	Team	Apps	(Gls)
1969–1971	Derry City		
1971–1973	Linfield		
1973–1976	Coleraine	129	(41)
1976–1978	Burnley	67	(13)
1978–1983	Middlesbrough	111	(7)
1983	→ Eastern (loan)	12	(8)
1983–1986	Gillingham	107	(17)
1986	Dallas Sidekicks	0	(0)
1986	Coleraine		
1986–1987	Millwall	1	(0)
1987	Hartlepool United	2	(0)
1987–1990	Billingham Synthonia	21	(4)
- Marske United
- Billingham Town
1992–1993	South Bank		
1993–1994	Ferryhill Athletic		

International career
1975–1984	Northern Ireland	26	(1)

Managerial career
- 2008: Glenavon
- * Club domestic league appearances and goals

George Terence Cochrane (born 23 January 1953) is a Northern Irish former footballer who played in midfield as a winger.

Cochrane started out as a youngster with Derry City and had been rejected after a months trial with Everton, then managed by Billy Bingham, for "not having the right build" to play in midfield. Cochrane returned to the Irish League to play for Linfield, and then Coleraine, thinking his dream of playing English football was over. At Coleraine, under the tutelage of former Northern Ireland boss, Bertie Peacock, Cochrane developed into a fine winger and was capped by his country for the first time in October 1975 against Norway.

In October 1976 Cochrane moved to Burnley, then playing in Division Two. With Burnley he became a much sought-after player - his scintillating displays aiding Burnley in their survival from relegation. Middlesbrough later paid a club record fee of £233,333 for him in October 1978. This was also a record fee for a Northern Ireland player and his debut came in a 2–0 home win over Norwich City on 14 October. After five years at Ayresome Park and a brief spell playing in Hong Kong with Eastern, Cochrane moved to Gillingham in October 1983. He was named as the Kent side's Player of the Season for 1984–85.

Never really established in the international team, indeed 13 of his 26 caps came as a sub, he is remembered for his goal against England during the 1980 British Home Championship. The goal came nine minutes after he had come on as a sub, and just sixty seconds after the English had scored, to earn Northern Ireland a crucial 1–1 draw as they went on to win the Championships for the first time in 66 years.

A hamstring injury picked up in a warm-up match against France ruled Cochrane out of the 1982 World Cup squad after playing in all but two of the qualifiers. He was capped just twice more after that World Cup series, acting as Martin O'Neill's deputy in a British Championship game against Scotland in December 1983, as Northern Ireland won the trophy; and as substitute for Gerry Armstrong in a World Cup qualifier against Finland in May 1984. He failed to make the 1986 World Cup squad before short spells with Millwall (November 1986) and Hartlepool United (January 1987). Later Cochrane moved into non-league football with Billingham Synthonia, coached the Saudi Arabian Military team, and had a spell as player-manager of the ill-fated South Bank.

Cochrane lived in the Middlesbrough area for a number of years, working as a media pundit and youth coach.

In January 2008 he was appointed manager at Glenavon who play in the Irish Premier League, though he left the club by mutual consent the following June.

In August 2009 he took over as coach of Hartlepool Ladies Football Club.

In 2014 Cochrane released an autobiography, See You At The Far Post.
