= Tony Arins =

English footballer (born 1958)

Personal information
- Full name: Anthony Francis Arins
- Date of birth: 26 October 1958 (age 68)
- Place of birth: Chesterfield, England
- Height: 5 ft 11 in (1.80 m)
- Position: Full-back

Senior career*
Years	Team	Apps	(Gls)
1978–1980	Burnley	29	(2)
1981	Leeds United	1	(0)
1981–1982	Scunthorpe United	20	(1)
Total		50	(3)
- * Club domestic league appearances and goals

Anthony Francis Arins (born 26 October 1958) is an English former professional footballer who played as a full-back.

Arins started his career with Burnley and made his professional debut on 18 November 1978 in the 5–3 win over Fulham in the Football League Second Division. He scored his first senior goal on 3 November 1979 in the 1–2 defeat to Orient. He played his final game for Burnley on 26 April 1980 when he started in the 0–0 draw with Birmingham City at Turf Moor. In the summer of 1981, Arins signed for Leeds United but left after playing only one match for the club. He spent the remainder of the season with Scunthorpe United, making 20 league appearances and scoring one goal for the side. Arins retired from football in 1982 to join the police force. He retired from the police service in May 2016.

== Honours ==
Burnley

- Anglo-Scottish Cup: 1978
