= Ian Brennan (footballer) =

English footballer

Personal information
- Date of birth: 25 March 1953 (age 73)
- Place of birth: Easington, England
- Height: 5 ft 11 in (1.80 m)
- Position: Defender

Senior career*
Years	Team	Apps	(Gls)
1973–1980	Burnley	175	(11)
1980–1982	Bolton Wanderers	17	(0)
- * Club domestic league appearances and goals

Ian Brennan (born 25 March 1953) is an English former professional footballer who played as a defender. He played in the Football League for Burnley and Bolton Wanderers, making more than 230 first-team appearances in total, and later had spells in non-league football with Colne Dynamoes and Burnley Belvedere.

== Career ==
Although born in the town of Easington, County Durham, Brennan played for the Chesterfield and Derbyshire schoolboys' teams before joining Burnley as an apprentice following a successful trial. He signed his first professional contract with the First Division club in October 1970, but played solely for the reserve team during his first three seasons in Lancashire. Brennan eventually made his senior debut for Burnley on 6 April 1974, deputising for the unavailable Keith Newton in the 0–4 defeat away at Stoke City. He did not appear again in the league during the 1973–74 season but established himself as the first-choice left back in the following campaign, making 37 appearances, with Newton moving to the right wing to accommodate him. Brennan scored his first goal for Burnley in the 1–0 win against Liverpool on 24 September 1974, beating England international goalkeeper Ray Clemence with a well-struck shot from 30 yards out.

In September 1975, four games into the new season, Brennan was involved in a car accident. The resulting injuries kept him sidelined for over a year and in his absence Burnley were relegated to the Second Division in the summer of 1976. He returned to action midway through the 1976–77 campaign and went on to play 33 matches in total during the remainder of the season, scoring twice. Brennan was almost ever present over the next two-and-a-half seasons and was part of the team that won the Anglo-Scottish Cup in 1978, beating Oldham Athletic over two legs in the final. He enjoyed the most prolific goalscoring year of his career the following season, netting six goals in all competitions including four in the Second Division. In total, Brennan played 212 first-team games for the Turf Moor club during 10 years with the club. His last appearance for Burnley came in the goalless draw with Shrewsbury Town on 5 April 1980.

Burnley were relegated to the Third Division for the 1980–81 season and while Brennan spent the first four months of the campaign with the club, he did not play a first-team match. In December 1980, he transferred to Second Division side Bolton Wanderers for a fee of £25,000. He spent 18 months with the Burnden Park outfit, making 17 league appearances for the club. Brennan retired from professional football in the summer of 1982 and subsequently moved into non-league, assisting Burnley Belvedere and later Colne Dynamoes.

== Honours ==
Burnley

- Anglo-Scottish Cup: 1978
