= Peter Noble (footballer) =

English footballer (1944–2017)

Personal information
- Full name: Peter Noble
- Date of birth: 19 August 1944
- Place of birth: Sunderland, England
- Date of death: 6 May 2017 (aged 72)
- Height: 5 ft 9 in (1.75 m)
- Position: Forward

Senior career*
| Years | Team | Apps | (Gls) |
| 1960–1964 | Consett | ? | (?) |
| 1964–1968 | Newcastle United | 25 | (7) |
| 1968–1973 | Swindon Town | 214 | (62) |
| 1973–1980 | Burnley | 243 | (63) |
| 1980–1983 | Blackpool | 97 | (14) |
| Total | | 579 | (146) |
- * Club domestic league appearances and goals

Peter Noble (19 August 1944 – 6 May 2017) was an English footballer who played forward.

== Career ==
Noble began his career with Consett where he combined a career in painting and decorating with football. After an impressive season with a record breaking Consett side he was signed for nearby giants Newcastle United where he made 25 appearances.

Noble signed for Swindon Town from Newcastle United in January 1968 for £8,000 and made his debut as a substitute in a 3–0 win over Walsall at the beginning of February.

In the following season he scored 16 league goals and was the club's top scorer, but his main contribution was to the successful League Cup campaign. He played in every match en route to the final. Noble scored four goals, including the extra time winner in the semi-final replay versus Burnley. He only discovered five years later that he had suffered a broken shoulder blade in that game. In the final Swindon beat First Division giants Arsenal 3–1 in a great giant killing feat.

He was the club's top scorer again in 1969–70 with 12 goals and once more in 1971–72, with 14. He also scored in both the 1969 Anglo-Italian League Cup final and the 1970 Anglo-Italian Cup final where he lined up against Roma. Noble left Swindon at the end of the 1972–73 season, when Burnley paid £35,000 for his services.

Burnley originally played him in the fullback position and he reached the final of the Texaco Cup in his first season, losing 2–1 to his old club, Newcastle United in extra time. They eventually moved him up into midfield, and he became their top scorer for three of the following four seasons. He also became the team's penalty taker. Noble captained Burnley as they won the Anglo Scottish Cup in 1979, that included an infamous two legged victory over Scottish Champions Celtic, whose fans rioted in their 1–0 defeat in the first leg of the quarter-final at Turf Moor. Burnley won the tie 3–1 on aggregate, before going on to beat Oldham Athletic 4–2 in the final. He was a favourite with the Turf Moor supporters with his commitment, drive and goal scoring. Noble scored 63 goals in 243 appearances and was club captain for much of his seven-year stay at the club.

In 1980, he moved to Blackpool where he continued a partnership with another ex-Burnley player, Paul Fletcher. At the time he also opened a sports shop in Burnley indoor market – Peter Noble Sport Ltd. – which he successfully ran with his family for nearly 20 years.

Noble ended his career having scored every penalty he took. This record of 28 consecutive penalties is widely believed to be a world record. In 1985 a question about Noble's penalty kicks appeared in the first edition of the popular board game Trivial Pursuit.

In 2006 at a special dinner at Turf Moor Noble, along with a number of other players, was officially declared a 'Burnley Football Club Legend' by the East Lancashire club.

== Honours ==
Swindon Town

- Football League Cup: 1968–69
- Anglo-Italian League Cup: 1969
- Anglo-Italian Cup: 1970

Burnley

- Anglo-Scottish Cup: 1978–79
- Texaco Cup runner-up: 1973–74
