= Malcolm Smith (footballer, born 1953) =

English footballer

Personal information
- Date of birth: 21 September 1953 (age 73)
- Place of birth: Ferryhill, England
- Height: 5 ft 8 in (1.73 m)
- Position: Striker

Senior career*
| Years | Team | Apps | (Gls) |
| 1970–1976 | Middlesbrough | 68 | (13) |
| 1975–1976 | → Bury (loan) | 5 | (1) |
| 1976 | → Blackpool (loan) | 8 | (5) |
| 1976 | → Portland Timbers (loan) | 19 | (3) |
| 1976–1980 | Burnley | 102 | (20) |
| 1980–1982 | York City | 39 | (6) |
| Total | | 241 | (48) |
- * Club domestic league appearances and goals

Malcolm Smith (born 21 September 1953) is an English former professional footballer who played as a striker.

== Early career ==
Malcolm was born in Stockton on Tees but grew up in Ferryhill Co. Durham. He represented Durham County Schoolboys and after successful trials had offers to join Newcastle, Leeds and Middlesbrough.He signed as an apprentice with Middlesbrough in the summer of 1968.

All the young Boro players were under the guidance of the Boro's Junior coach George Wardle. Malcolm rated George very highly as a coach, as a mentor and friend. George was key in his development from a schoolboy to a young professional and onto the first team.

== Senior Football Career ==
=== Middlesbrough ===
As an 18 year old, Stan Anderson gave Malcolm his full league debut for Middlesbrough in August 1972 - against local rivals Sunderland at a packed Ayresome Park. It was a dream debut, Malcolm scoring both goals for the Boro in a 2–1 win. However one of Middlesbrough most successful seasons was 1973/4. England Legend Jack Charlton had taken over as manager - his first season as a manager - and he moulded and organised the squad into a team that is widely recognised as one of the best in the club's history. Jack successfully steered the club back to the First Division, as record breaking champions, creating new club and division records. Malcolm was very much a part of Jack's main squad of just 13 regular players and in that memorable season he played or was sub in 28 games scoring 6 goals and collected a Division Two Champions winning medal.

=== Blackpool ===
The following season proved frustrating with limited starts and so Malcolm persuaded Jack to allow him to go out on loan to gain more game time. After the success of a month long loan to Blackpool (5 goals in 8 games) the Blackpool manager Harry Potts was keen to make the transfer permanent, but the Blackpool directors were unable to raise the transfer fee.

=== Burnley ===
When Harry Potts returned to Lancashire rivals Burnley, initially as chief scout, he recommended that Burnley sign Malcolm on loan in November 1976. Potts, once again appointed manager, then made the deal permanent in February 1977. Prior to the transfer to Burnley, Malcolm spent the summer on loan at Portland Timbers playing in the North American Soccer League (NASL). Playing in this league offered him the opportunity and experience to play against some of the football's all-time greats including Pele, Eusebio, Bobby Moore and George Best.

=== York City ===
After 4 years at Burnley playing over 100 games scoring 20 goals and wanting to return to the North East, Malcolm signed for York City before retiring from football early to concentrate and develop his business interests.

== Honours ==
- Middlesbrough - The Football League Division 2 Champions Medal 1973–74
- Middlesbrough - Voted Boro Supporters Young Player of the Year 1973–74

== Post Football ==
During his playing career Malcolm completed a Diploma in Business Management (DMS) at Teesside University and towards the end of his playing career established a vehicle rental business near his Durham home. After successfully selling the rental company he established a property company consisting of commercial units and student housing. Through his sporting connections Malcolm also ran a freelance Retail Sports Agent/Consultancy operating for several brands including Hi-Tec, Reebok & Adidas Fitness.

== Personal ==
Malcolm lives in Durham City with wife Beverley and they have two daughters - Ashley who is a Pharmacist and Natalie who is a Partner in a Hedge Fund.

General
- Malcolm Smith at Post War English & Scottish Football League A–Z Player's Transfer Database
