= Peter Robinson (footballer, born 1957) =

English footballer (born 1957)

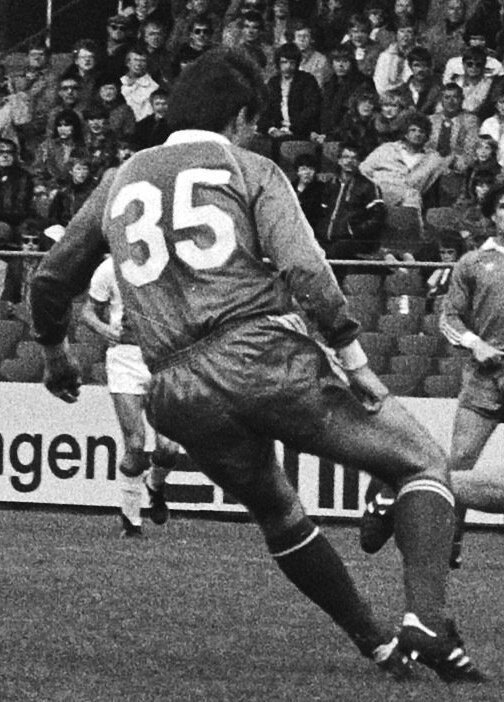
- Robinson with Sparta Rotterdam in 1981

Personal information
- Date of birth: 4 September 1957 (age 69)
- Place of birth: Newbiggin-by-the-Sea, England
- Height: 6 ft 1 in (1.85 m)
- Position: Defender

Senior career*
| Years | Team | Apps | (Gls) |
| 1976–1980 | Burnley | 55 | (3) |
| 1980–1982 | Sparta Rotterdam | 58 | (0) |
| 1982–1985 | Blyth Spartans | 90 | (?) |
| 1985 | Rochdale | 12 | (0) |
| 1985–1988 | Darlington | 112 | (5) |
| 1985 | → Halifax Town (loan) | 5 | (0) |
- * Club domestic league appearances and goals

Peter Robinson (born 4 September 1957) is an English former professional footballer who played as a central defender.

After retiring from professional football, Robinson went on to become a Physical Education teacher at Bebside Middle School and later The Blyth School Community College in Blyth, Northumberland. He retired from teaching at the end of the school year in 2012.
