= Alan Stevenson (footballer) =

English footballer

Personal information
- Date of birth: 6 November 1950 (age 76)
- Place of birth: Staveley, England
- Position: Goalkeeper

Senior career*
Years	Team	Apps	(Gls)
1969–1972	Chesterfield	104	(0)
1972–1983	Burnley	438	(0)
1983–1984	Rotherham United	24	(0)
1984–1985	Hartlepool United	35	(0)
Total		601	(0)

International career
1972–1974	England U23	11	(0)
- * Club domestic league appearances and goals

Alan Stevenson (born 6 November 1950) is an English former professional footballer who played as a goalkeeper. He played for four clubs in the Football League, making a total of over 600 league appearances. After his retirement, he became commercial manager at Hartlepool, and later held the same role at Middlesbrough, West Bromwich Albion and Huddersfield Town. At Huddersfield, he oversaw the club's stadium move. He later held similar roles with Bolton Wanderers, Wembley Stadium, Hull City, Widnes Rugby League, Coventry City, Doncaster Rovers, Shrewsbury Town and Chesterfield. In September 2013, he joined York City to oversee their planned 2016 move to a new stadium.

== Honours ==
Burnley

- Football League Third Division: 1981–82
