= Billy Ingham =

English footballer

Personal information
- Full name: William Charles Ingham
- Date of birth: 22 October 1952
- Place of birth: Stakeford, England
- Date of death: 7 November 2009 (aged 57)
- Place of death: Blackburn, England
- Position: Midfielder

Senior career*
Years	Team	Apps	(Gls)
1969–1980	Burnley	211	(22)
1980–1982	Bradford City	78	(4)
- * Club domestic league appearances and goals

William Charles Ingham (22 October 1952 – 7 November 2009) was an English professional footballer who played as a midfielder. Born in Stakeford, Ingham began his career with Football League Second Division side Burnley, making his senior debut in 1972. After eight years in the Burnley first team, he transferred to Bradford City in 1980 for a fee of £30,000 and went on to play almost 80 league games before being forced to retire in 1982. He later played non-league football for Accrington Stanley while working as a bus driver.

== Personal life ==
Ingham was born in the village of Stakeford in Northumberland but moved to Burnley at the age of 15 when he was signed by Burnley F.C. as an apprentice. Following his retirement from football, he continued to live in Burnley, and worked as a bus driver for Burnley & Pendle. In 2008, Ingham was taken ill and was given last rites in hospital. He returned home but failed to fully recover and on 7 November 2009, he died following the illness.

== Football career ==
Ingham began his career with Burnley where he was affectionately known as "the Ginger Pele". After joining the club as an apprentice at the age of fifteen, he was promoted from the youth team in 1969 and made his first-team debut on 12 February 1972, coming on as a substitute for Alan West in the 0–2 defeat to Hull City in the Football League Second Division. His first start for the club came on 3 April 1972 as the side lost 3–4 to Sunderland. He went on to play 265 games for the Clarets in all competitions, scoring 31 goals between 1972 and 1980.

He was signed by Bradford City manager George Mulhall in 1980 for a fee of £30,000 and played 78 league games for the club in the following two seasons. He was part of the team which won promotion to the Football League Third Division in 1982, although he missed the last two months of the season through an injury which eventually ended his playing career at the age of 29. After retirement from the professional game, Ingham played part-time non-league football for Accrington Stanley. Prior to the 1986–87 season, he was given the chance to return to Turf Moor by manager Brian Miller, but he turned down the offer.
