= Jim Thomson (footballer, born 1946) =

Scottish footballer

Personal information
- Full name: James Shaw Thomson
- Date of birth: 1 October 1946 (age 80)
- Place of birth: Glasgow, Scotland
- Position: Defender

Senior career*
Years	Team	Apps	(Gls)
1965–1968	Chelsea	39	(1)
1968–1981	Burnley	297	(3)
Total		336	(4)
- * Club domestic league appearances and goals

James Shaw Thomson (born 1 October 1946) is a Scottish former professional footballer who played as a defender for Chelsea from 1965 to 1968 before subsequently moving to Burnley until retiring in 1981.
