= Paul Fletcher (footballer) =

English footballer

Paul Fletcher MBE
Personal information
- Full name: Paul John Fletcher
- Date of birth: 13 January 1951 (age 75)
- Place of birth: Bolton, England
- Height: 5 ft 9 1/2 in (1.77 m)
- Position: Striker

Senior career*
Years	Team	Apps	(Gls)
1968–1971	Bolton Wanderers	36	(5)
1971–1980	Burnley	293	(71)
1980–1981	Blackpool	20	(8)
Total		349	(84)

International career
1973–1974	England U-23	4	(1)
- * Club domestic league appearances and goals

Paul John Fletcher MBE (born 13 January 1951) is an English retired professional footballer who played as a striker. He was the chief executive of Burnley. In February 2018 he published with Alastair Campbell a co-written novel on football and terrorism in the 1970s, Saturday Bloody Saturday. which within the first week after publication was in The Sunday Times Top Ten Bestsellers.

== Early years ==
Paul Fletcher attended Smithills Technical School in Bolton and in 1967 joined his home town club Bolton Wanderers. In 1970, he became one of the country's most expensive transfers when he joined Burnley Football Club for a club record fee. During the next ten years he made over 400 appearances, mostly in the old First Division – now named the Premier League. After gaining four England U23 International caps he was selected in Don Revie's England squad, but a serious knee injury put paid to a full England call up. A second serious leg injury forced his early retirement at the age of 32.

== After playing ==
Following a sixteen-year career as a professional footballer he has now become an executive for many sporting teams specialising in stadium development and management. His executive career in football began at Colne Dynamoes F.C. in the late 1980s. Since then he has been Chief Executive at Huddersfield Town where, over a six-year period, he masterminded the Alfred McAlpine Stadium, voted the RIBA 'Building of the Year 'in 1995.

In 1996, he then returned to his old club Bolton Wanderers F.C. as Chief Executive at the new £40 million Reebok Stadium, the BCI Building of the Year in 1998. In 1999, after two years at the Reebok, he was invited by the FA to become Commercial Director of the new £500 million Wembley National Stadium. After eighteen months, as costs escalated, he walked away from the project commenting that he 'needed to spend more time with his wife and family in the Lancashire sunshine'.

== Arena construction ==
Within weeks he took up the position as Chief Executive of Arena Coventry Limited to head-up the construction and delivery of the proposed £64 million Ricoh Arena in Coventry, which is destined to become one of the country's largest sports and leisure venues. This includes a 32,000-seat stadium for Coventry City, the largest casino in the UK, two hotels, an exhibition centre, health and fitness club and a wide range of community facilities.

== Club director ==
On 1 January 2006 he was invited to join the Board of Coventry City Football Club as managing director. In October 2007, following a 9-month period of negotiations with various parties, Paul resigned in protest of the stadium's owners, Arena Coventry Limited, for their refusal to accept a purchase proposal from an American consortium for both the Ricoh Arena and Coventry City FC.

Two months later he was invited to take up a position as Chief Executive at Burnley Football Club. In May 2009 whilst under Paul's stewardship as CEO, Burnley was promoted into the Barclays Premier League for the first time in 34 years. In late 2011 he resigned this position to take up a new role as managing director (and co-founder, with Burnley Director Brendan Flood) of UCFB (University & College of Football Business) located at Turf Moor Stadium. In 2011 UCFB won a FA Football Award for "Most innovative use of a football stadium on non-matchdays". In February 2013 UCFB announced its second campus in partnership with Wembley Stadium. In 2014 UCFB relocated from Turf Moor Burnley to The Etihad Stadium Manchester. Both campuses now (in February 2018) have attracted about 2,000 students (combined).

He lives with his wife and family in the Rossendale Valley in the heart of Lancashire close to Turf Moor, Burnley and is an active member of the George Formby Society.

== Awards ==
In the 2007 New Year Honours, Fletcher was appointed Member of the Order of the British Empire (MBE) "for services to sport and to charity."
