= 1889–90 Burnley F.C. season =

English football club season

Burnley
1889–90 season
- Chairman: Wyatt Granger
- Manager: Managed by club committee
- Football League: 11th (re-elected)
- FA Cup: First Round
- Lancashire Senior Cup: Winners
- Top goalscorer: Robert Haresnape (6)
- Highest home attendance: 8,000 (vs Aston Villa, 5 October 1889)
- Lowest home attendance: 2,000 (vs Derby County, 8 March 1890)
Home colours

The 1889–90 season was the eighth season in the history of Burnley Football Club and their second in the Football League. Burnley ended the season in 11th position with a record of 4 wins, 5 draws and 13 defeats. As a result, the club was forced to apply for re-election to the League for the following season; the application was successful and Burnley retained their berth for the 1890–91 campaign. Burnley lost eight consecutive matches between 9 November 1889 and 22 February 1890 and did not achieve their first win in the League until 1 March 1890, when they beat Bolton Wanderers 7–0. The team was knocked out by Sheffield United in the First Round of the FA Cup, but they had success in the Lancashire Senior Cup, beating Rossendale United, Higher Walton and Haydock on the way to the final, where they defeated rivals Blackburn Rovers by two goals to nil.

== Football League ==
=== Match results ===
Date	Opponents	Result	Goalscorers	Attendance
7 September 1889	Aston Villa (A)	2–2	Heyes, Haresnape	4,000
14 September 1889	Everton (A)	1–2	Ashworth	12,000
21 September 1889	Accrington (H)	2–2	Campbell, Duckworth	3,000
28 September 1889	Preston North End (H)	0–3		7,000
5 October 1889	Aston Villa (H)	2–6	Friel, scrimmage	8,000
12 October 1889	West Bromwich Albion (H)	1–2	Yates	6,000
19 October 1889	Accrington (A)	2–2	McFettridge, Haresnape	2,000
26 October 1889	Blackburn Rovers (A)	1–7	Campbell	4,000
2 November 1889	Notts County (A)	1–1	Heyes	1,000
9 November 1889	Wolverhampton Wanderers (H)	1–2	Murray	4,000
23 November 1889	West Bromwich Albion (A)	1–6	Crabtree	7,100
30 November 1889	Preston North End (A)	0–6		
7 December 1889	Wolverhampton Wanderers (A)	1–9	Fletcher (og)	2,000
4 January 1890	Derby County (A)	1–4	Campbell	3,000
11 January 1890	Stoke (H)	1–3	Ashworth	
8 February 1890	Everton (H)	0–1		6,500
22 February 1890	Blackburn Rovers (H)	1–2	Stewart	7,000
1 March 1890	Bolton Wanderers (H)	7–0	Lambie (3), Haresnape (2), Hill, McColl	
8 March 1890	Derby County (H)	2–0	Hill, McColl	2,000
10 March 1890	Stoke (A)	4–3	Haresnape (2), Lambie (2)	
15 March 1890	Notts County (H)	3–0	Stewart (2), scrimmage	
17 March 1890	Bolton Wanderers (A)	2–2	McFettridge, Hill	

=== Final league position ===
Pos	Team	Pld	W	D	L	GF	GA	GAv	Pts	Relegation
8	Aston Villa	22	7	5	10	43	51	0.843	19	
9	Bolton Wanderers	22	9	1	12	54	65	0.831	19	
10	Notts County	22	6	5	11	43	51	0.843	17	Re-elected
11	Burnley	22	4	5	13	36	65	0.554	13	Re-elected
12	Stoke (R)	22	3	4	15	27	69	0.391	10	Failed re-election and demoted to the Football Alliance

Source: World Football
Rules for classification: 1) Points; 2) Goal average; 3) Goals scored
(R) Relegated

== FA Cup ==
=== Match results ===
Round	Date	Opponents	Result	Goalscorers	Attendance
First round	18 January 1890	Sheffield United (A)	1–2	Bury	2,000

== Lancashire Senior Cup ==
=== Match results ===
Round	Date	Opponents	Result	Goalscorers
First round	28 October 1889	Rossendale United (A)	4–3	Heyes (2), scrimmage, Crabtree
Quarter final	20 January 1890	Haydock (H)	15–0	Haresnape (2), Murray (5), McColl (2), Campbell (2), Lang (2), Heyes (2)
Semi final	12 April 1890	Higher Walton (at Bury)	7–0	Hill (2), unknown, McLardie (2), Lambie, Spiers
Final	26 April 1890	Blackburn Rovers (at Accrington)	2–0	Stewart (2)

== Player statistics ==
Key to positions

- CF = Centre forward
- FB = Fullback
- GK = Goalkeeper
- HB = Half-back
- IF = Inside forward
- OF = Outside forward

Statistics

Nat.	Position	Player	Football League		FA Cup		Total
Nat.	Position	Player	Apps	Goals	Apps	Goals	Apps	Goals
(England)	OF	John Ashworth	2	2	0	0	2	2
(England)	FB	William Bury	22	0	1	1	23	1
?	CF	G Caldow	6	0	0	0	6	0
?	IF	J Campbell	14	3	1	0	15	3
(England)	GK	Walter Cox	13	0	0	0	13	0
?	IF	B Coyle	2	0	0	0	2	0
(England)	OF	Jimmy Crabtree	3	1	1	0	4	1
(England)	IF	Robert Duckworth	4	1	0	0	4	1
(Scotland)	HB	Dan Friel	5	1	0	0	5	1
(England)	OF	Robert Haresnape	19	6	1	0	20	6
?	IF	L Heyes	11	2	1	0	12	2
(Scotland)	OF	Jimmy Hill	8	3	0	0	8	3
(Scotland)	GK	Archibald Kaye	6	0	0	0	6	0
(England)	HB	Jack Keenan	18	0	1	0	19	0
(Scotland)	CF	Claude Lambie	7	5	0	0	7	5
(Scotland)	FB	Sandy Lang	21	0	1	0	22	0
(Scotland)	IF	William McColl	9	2	1	0	10	2
(England)	GK	James McConnell	1	0	1	0	2	0
(Scotland)	HB	Bill McFettridge	21	2	1	0	22	2
(Scotland)	IF	Alexander McLardie	2	0	0	0	2	0
?	CF	T Murray	7	1	0	0	7	1
(England)	GK	William Smith	2	0	0	0	2	0
(Scotland)	HB	Daniel Spiers	3	0	0	0	3	0
(Scotland)	IF	Alec Stewart	9	3	0	0	9	3
(England)	HB	Thomas White	21	0	1	0	22	0
(England)	OF	Jack Yates	6	1	0	0	6	1
