= 1890–91 Burnley F.C. season =

English football club season

Burnley
1890–91 season
- Chairman: Wyatt Granger
- Manager: Managed by club committee
- Football League: 8th
- FA Cup: Second Round
- Top goalscorer: League: Claude Lambie (16); All: Claude Lambie (17)
- Highest home attendance: 10,000 (three occasions)
- Lowest home attendance: 3,500 (vs Wolverhampton Wanderers, 1 November 1890)
Home colours

The 1890–91 season was the ninth season in the history of Burnley Football Club and their third in the Football League. Burnley ended the season in eighth position with a record of 9 wins, 3 draws and 10 defeats, thus finishing outside the bottom four for the first time. Scottish forwards Claude Lambie and Alexander McLardie were the top goalscorers, with 16 and 14 league goals respectively. Burnley progressed to the Second Round of the FA Cup for the first time in two years, before being knocked out by Notts County. During the season 24 different players were used by Burnley, with many of the squad hailing from Scotland. In the 6–2 win against Preston North End on 7 March 1891, striker Tom Nicol became the first and only Burnley player to score a hat-trick on his League debut.

== Football League ==
=== Match results ===
Date	Opponents	Result	Goalscorers	Attendance
6 September 1890	Accrington (A)	1–1	Lambie	8,000
13 September 1890	Sunderland (A)	3–2	Stewart, Lambie, McLardie	5,000
20 September 1890	Aston Villa (H)	2–1	Lambie, McLardie	10,000
27 September 1890	Sunderland (H)	3–3	Lambie, Spiers, McLardie	8,000
4 October 1890	West Bromwich Albion (A)	1–3	Yates	6,000
11 October 1890	Bolton Wanderers (H)	1–2	Hill	7,500
18 October 1890	Blackburn Rovers (H)	1–6	McLardie	10,000
25 October 1890	Wolverhampton Wanderers (H)	1–3	Mason (o.g.)	3,000
1 November 1890	Wolverhampton Wanderers (A)	4–2	McLardie (2), Lambie, Place senior	3,500
8 November 1890	Aston Villa (A)	4–4	Lambie (3), McLardie	5,000
15 November 1890	Derby County (H)	6–1	Lambie (4), McLardie, Marr	6,000
22 November 1890	Blackburn Rovers (A)	2–5	Place senior, McLardie	4,000
29 November 1890	Accrington (H)	2–0	McLardie, Lambie	6,000
6 December 1890	West Bromwich Albion (H)	5–4	Marr, Hill, Oswald, McLardie (2)	5,500
20 December 1890	Notts County (H)	0–1		4,500
27 December 1890	Everton (A)	3–7	Hill, McLardie (2)	12,000
25 January 1891	Derby County (A)	4–2	Lambie (3), scrimmage	2,500
2 February 1891	Preston North End (A)	0–7		3,000
10 February 1891	Notts County (A)	0–4		4,000
7 March 1891	Preston North End (H)	6–2	Nicol (3), Marr (2), Hill	7,000
14 March 1891	Everton (H)	3–2	Haresnape, Bowes, Stewart	10,000
21 March 1891	Bolton Wanderers (A)	0–1		4,500

=== Final league position ===
Pos	Team	Pld	W	D	L	GF	GA	GAv	Pts	Qualification
6	Blackburn Rovers	22	11	2	9	52	43	1.209	24	
7	Sunderland	22	10	5	7	51	31	1.645	23 (Note: Sunderland were deducted two points for fielding an unregistered player.)	
8	Burnley	22	9	3	10	52	63	0.825	21	
9	Aston Villa	22	7	4	11	45	58	0.776	18	Re-elected
10	Accrington	22	6	4	12	28	50	0.560	16	Re-elected

== FA Cup ==
Round	Date	Opponents	Result	Goalscorers	Attendance
First round	17 January 1891	Crewe Alexandra (H)	4–2 (a.e.t.)	Lambie, Oswald, Hill, McLardie	
Second round	31 January 1891	Notts County (A)	1–2	McLardie	9,500

== Lancashire Senior Cup ==
Round	Date	Opponents	Result	Goalscorers
First round	7 February 1891	Darwen (H)	2–3	Hill, Place junior

== Player statistics ==
Key to positions

- CF = Centre forward
- FB = Fullback
- GK = Goalkeeper
- HB = Half-back
- IF = Inside forward
- OF = Outside forward

Statistics

Nat.	Position	Player	Football League		FA Cup		Total
Nat.	Position	Player	Apps	Goals	Apps	Goals	Apps	Goals
(Scotland)	IF	Billy Bowes	3	1	0	0	3	1
(Scotland)	IF	John Brodie	2	0	0	0	2	0
(England)	FB	William Bury	1	0	2	0	3	0
(England)	FB	Zacharious Carr	1	0	0	0	1	0
(England)	OF	Thomas Crossley	1	0	0	0	1	0
(England)	FB	James Duerden	3	0	0	0	3	0
(England)	OF	Robert Haresnape	7	1	1	0	8	1
(Scotland)	OF	Jimmy Hill	16	4	2	1	18	5
(Scotland)	GK	Archibald Kaye	22	0	2	0	24	0
(England)	HB	Jack Keenan	18	0	2	0	20	0
(Scotland)	CF	Claude Lambie	18	16	2	1	20	17
(Scotland)	FB	Sandy Lang	18	0	2	0	20	0
(England)	IF	Robert Marr	9	4	0	0	9	4
(Scotland)	HB	Bill McFettridge	21	0	2	0	23	0
(Scotland)	IF	Alexander McLardie	17	14	2	2	19	16
(England)	HB	Joseph Nash	4	0	2	0	6	0
(Scotland)	CF	Tom Nicol	3	3	0	0	3	3
(Scotland)	OF	John Oswald	15	1	1	1	16	1
?	HB	T Patterson	2	0	0	0	2	0
(England)	OF	Walter Place senior	5	2	0	0	5	2
(Scotland)	HB	Daniel Spiers	18	1	0	0	18	1
(Scotland)	IF	Alec Stewart	16	2	2	0	18	2
(England)	FB	John Walker	21	0	0	0	21	0
(England)	OF	Jack Yates	1	1	0	0	1	1
