= 1891–92 Burnley F.C. season =

English football club season

Burnley
1891–92 season
- Chairman: Wyatt Granger
- Manager: Managed by club committee
- Football League: 7th
- FA Cup: Second Round
- Top goalscorer: League: Tom Nicol (17); All: Tom Nicol (18)
- Highest home attendance: 8,500 (two occasions)
- Lowest home attendance: 5,000 (three occasions)

The 1891–92 season was the tenth season in the history of Burnley Football Club and their fourth in The Football League. It was, up to that point, their most successful League season as the team finished in seventh place, with a record of 11 wins, 4 draws and 11 defeats. The top goalscorer was Scottish forward Tom Nicol, who scored 18 goals in 27 league and cup matches, while fellow Scot Alexander McLardie was the runner-up with 10 goals.

== Football League ==
=== Match results ===
Date	Opponents	Result	Goalscorers	Attendance
5 September 1891	Accrington (A)	0–1		7,000
7 September 1891	Preston North End (H)	2–0	Bowes, Haresnape	8,500
19 September 1891	Stoke (H)	4–1	Bowes (2), Nicol, Place	5,500
21 September 1891	Preston North End (A)	1–5	Nicol	
26 September 1891	Blackburn Rovers (A)	3–3	Lang, Nicol, McLardie	4,000
10 October 1891	Stoke (A)	0–3		3,000
17 October 1891	Aston Villa (H)	4–1	Bowes, Matthew, Nicol (2)	5,000
24 October 1891	Bolton Wanderers (A)	0–2		8,500
7 November 1891	Wolverhampton Wanderers (A)	0–0		1,200
14 November 1891	Accrington (H)	2–1	Graham, McLardie	7,000
21 November 1891	Sunderland (A)	1–2	Nicol	5,000
28 November 1891	West Bromwich Albion (H)	3–2	Nicol (2), Lang	8,000
5 December 1891	Aston Villa (A)	1–6	Hill	5,000
12 December 1891	Blackburn Rovers (H)	3–0	Nicol, Galbraith, Bowes	5,000
19 December 1891	Derby County (A)	1–0	Galbraith	4,000
26 December 1891	West Bromwich Albion (A)	0–1		5,000
2 January 1892	Everton (A)	1–1	McLardie	8,000
9 January 1892	Darwen (H)	9–0	Nicol (3), McLardie (3), Hill (2), Espie	5,000
13 February 1892	Everton (H)	1–0	Hill	8,000
1 March 1892	Notts County (A)	1–5	Espie	2,000
5 March 1892	Bolton Wanderers (H)	1–2	Nicol	5,000
26 March 1892	Wolverhampton Wanderers (H)	1–1	Nicol	4,000
2 April 1892	Darwen (A)	6–2	Nicol (2), Bowes, McLardie (2), Hill	3,000
15 April 1892	Notts County (H)	1–0	Nicol	8,500
16 April 1892	Derby County (H)	2–4	McLardie, Graham	6,000
30 April 1892	Sunderland (H)	1–2	McLardie	8,000

=== Final league position ===
Pos	Team	Pld	W	D	L	GF	GA	GAv	Pts
5	Everton	26	12	4	10	49	49	1.000	28
6	Wolverhampton Wanderers	26	11	4	11	59	46	1.283	26
7	Burnley	26	11	4	11	49	45	1.089	26
8	Notts County	26	11	4	11	55	51	1.078	26
9	Blackburn Rovers	26	10	6	10	58	65	0.892	26

== FA Cup ==
Round	Date	Opponents	Result	Goalscorers	Attendance
First round	23 January 1891	Everton (A)	3–1	Hill (2), Nicol	10,000
Second round	30 January 1891	Stoke (H)	1–3	Hill	6,000

== Lancashire Senior Cup ==
Round	Date	Opponents	Result	Goalscorers
First round	6 February 1891	Blackpool (H)	6–2	Hill (2), Nicol, Graham (2), McLardie
Second round	20 February 1891	Darwen (A)	0–1	

== Player statistics ==
Key to positions

- CF = Centre forward
- FB = Fullback
- GK = Goalkeeper
- HB = Half-back
- IF = Inside forward
- OF = Outside forward

Statistics

Nat.	Position	Player	Football League		FA Cup		Total
Nat.	Position	Player	Apps	Goals	Apps	Goals	Apps	Goals
(Scotland)	IF	Billy Bowes	24	6	2	0	26	6
(Scotland)	CF	Jock Espie	10	2	0	0	10	2
(Scotland)	OF	Hugh Galbraith	5	2	0	0	5	2
(England)	OF	William Graham	17	2	2	0	17	2
(England)	OF	Robert Haresnape	1	1	0	0	1	1
(Scotland)	OF	Jimmy Hill	21	5	2	3	23	8
(England)	GK	Jack Hillman	26	0	0	0	28	0
(England)	FB	William Jeffrey	7	0	0	0	7	0
(England)	HB	Jack Keenan	9	0	2	0	11	0
(Scotland)	FB	Sandy Lang	26	2	2	0	28	2
(Scotland)	HB	James Matthew	15	1	2	0	17	1
(Scotland)	HB	Bill McFettridge	25	0	2	0	27	0
(Scotland)	IF	Alexander McLardie	24	10	2	0	26	10
(Scotland)	CF	Tom Nicol	25	17	2	1	26	18
(England)	OF	Walter Place senior	8	1	0	0	8	1
(Scotland)	HB	Daniel Spiers	6	0	0	0	6	0
(Scotland)	IF	Alec Stewart	18	0	0	0	18	0
(England)	FB	John Walker	19	0	2	0	21	0
