= 1888–89 Burnley F.C. season =

English football club season

Burnley F.C.
1888–89 season
- Chairman: B Wyatt Granger
- Manager: Club Committee
- Football League: 9th (re-elected)
- FA Cup: Second Round
- Top goalscorer: League: Alec Brady (7); All: Pat Gallocher (9)
- Highest home attendance: 10,000 vs Preston North End (15 December 1888)
Home colours

The 1888–89 season was the seventh season in Burnley Football Club's history, and their first in league competition following the formation of the Football League in 1888. The side finished ninth in their inaugural league campaign, and as one of the bottom four teams in the division, they were forced to apply for re-election to return for the following season. Burnley began the season on 8 September 1888 with a 2–5 defeat away at Preston North End, who went on to be crowned league champions that year. In the next match, Burnley achieved their first league victory when they won 4–3 against Bolton Wanderers, with William Tait becoming the first player in history to score a league hat-trick.

Burnley's top goalscorer in the 1888–89 season was Scottish forward Pat Gallocher, who netted nine goals in all competitions, including Burnley's first in the Football League. Alec Brady was the top scorer in the league, with seven goals in 20 appearances. John Yates became the first Burnley player to be selected for an international match when he was called up to the England squad in March 1889, but despite scoring a hat-trick on his debut, he was never picked for England again.

In the FA Cup, Burnley reached the Second Round before being knocked out by West Bromwich Albion.

== Results ==
=== Football League ===
Pos	Team	Pld	W	D	L	GF	GA	GAv	Pts	Qualification
7	Accrington	22	6	8	8	48	48	1.000	20	
8	Everton	22	9	2	11	35	46	0.761	20	
9	Burnley	22	7	3	12	42	62	0.677	17	Re-elected
10	Derby County	22	7	2	13	41	61	0.672	16	Re-elected
11	Notts County	22	5	2	15	40	73	0.548	12	Re-elected

Source: World Football
Rules for classification: 1) Points; 2) Goal average; 3) Goals scored

8 September 1888	Preston North End	5–2	Burnley	Deepdale, Preston
	2', 3', 55', 65', 70'		Gallocher 21'; Poland 89'	Attendance: 6,000

15 September 1888	Bolton Wanderers	3–4	Burnley	Pike's Lane, Bolton
	5', 30', 33'		Tait 44', 65', 75'; Poland 54'

22 September 1888	Wolverhampton Wanderers	4–1	Burnley	Dudley Road, Wolverhampton
	15', 20', 70', 80'		A. Brady 60'	Attendance: 4,000

29 September 1888	West Bromwich Albion	4–3	Burnley	Stoney Lane, West Bromwich
	38', 43', 65', 88'		Tait 10'; Gallocher 25', 44'	Attendance: 2,100

6 October 1888	Burnley	4–1	Bolton Wanderers	Turf Moor, Burnley
	Poland 5', 33'; A. Brady 25'; Tait 60'		80'	Attendance: 6,000

13 October 1888	Burnley	0–4	Wolverhampton Wanderers	Turf Moor, Burnley
			15', 30', 43', 85'	Attendance: 4,000

20 October 1888	Stoke	4–3	Burnley	Victoria Ground, Stoke-upon-Trent
	20', 30', 43', 89'		Poland 50'; Unknown 55'; Opponent 87' (o.g.)

27 October 1888	Notts County	6–1	Burnley	Trent Bridge, Nottingham
	9', 11', 62', 70', 77', 85'		Yates 60'	Attendance: 5,000

3 November 1888	Burnley	1–7	Blackburn Rovers	Turf Moor, Burnley
	McKay 30'		15', 20', 25', 43', 80', 84', 87'	Attendance: 3,000

10 November 1888	Burnley	2–0	West Bromwich Albion	Turf Moor, Burnley
	McKay 20'; Unknown 65'			Attendance: 5,000

17 November 1888	Burnley	2–2	Everton	Turf Moor, Burnley
	Gallocher 10'; McKay 17'		25', 50'

24 November 1888	Everton	3–2	Burnley	Anfield, Liverpool
	38', 42', 45'		McKay 65'; A. Brady 72'

1 December 1888	Accrington	5–1	Burnley	Thorneyholme Road, Accrington
	3', 5', 65', 80', 85'		Horne 55' (o.g.)	Attendance: 5,000

8 December 1888	Burnley	2–1	Stoke	Turf Moor, Burnley
	W. Brady 15'; Yates 60'		80'	Attendance: 6,000

15 December 1888	Burnley	2–2	Preston North End	Turf Moor, Burnley
	McKay 30'; W. Brady 45'		43', 49'	Attendance: 10,000

22 December 1888	Aston Villa	4–2	Burnley	Wellington Road, Birmingham
	35', 44', 47', 70'		A. Brady 25'; McKay 80'	Attendance: 2,000

29 December 1888	Burnley	1–0	Notts County	Turf Moor, Burnley
	Abrahams 75'

5 January 1889	Burnley	4–0	Aston Villa	Turf Moor, Burnley
	Yates 15', 85'; Gallocher 55'; A. Brady 70'			Attendance: 6,000

12 January 1889	Burnley	2–2	Accrington	Turf Moor, Burnley
	Yates 25'; A. Brady 53'		43', 65'	Attendance: 6,000

19 January 1889	Burnley	1–0	Derby County	Turf Moor, Burnley
	McKay 85'			Attendance: 3,000

4 February 1889	Blackburn Rovers	4–2	Burnley	Leamington Road, Blackburn
	30', 32', 44', 75'		Gallocher 34'; A. Brady 36'	Attendance: 2,000

2 March 1889	Derby County	1–0	Burnley	Racecourse Ground, Derby
	75'			Attendance: 3,000

=== FA Cup ===
2 February 1889 First Round	Burnley	4–3	Old Westminsters	Turf Moor, Burnley
	W. Brady 20'; Gallocher 23', 75'; Lang 42'		1', 55', 60'

16 February 1889 Second Round	West Bromwich Albion	5–1	Burnley	Stoney Lane, West Bromwich
	5', 25', 35', 42', 60'		Gallocher 75'	Attendance: 5,104
