= Kavanagh (Burnley footballer) =

Scottish footballer

Personal information
- Place of birth: Scotland
- Position: Full-back

Senior career*
Years	Team	Apps	(Gls)
1886	Leith Harp		
1887	Hibernian		
1888	Burnley	1	(0)
1889	Nelson		
- * Club domestic league appearances and goals

Kavanagh (also spelled Cavanagh) was a Scottish professional association footballer who played as a full-back. He played just 1 match in the Football League for Burnley.*

== Playing career ==
Kavanagh started his career in his native Scotland with Leith Harp and Hibernian before joining Football League side Burnley midway through the 1888–89 season. Kavanagh made his Burnley debut on 1 December 1888 at Thorneyholme Road, Accrington and he replaced Sandy Lang as right-back. The latter had switched to left-back. Burnley took on Accrington. The match was a nightmare for the Burnley defence and Burnley were 2-0 down after just five minutes. After thirty minutes matters got worse for Burnley because Ross McMahon was injured and had to leave the field so Burnley were down to ten men. Burnley got one back but Accrington made it 3-1 by half-time. The second half was one-way traffic and Accrington added two more to runout winners by 5-1.

This was the only match Kavanagh played and the following year he left for Nelson. Burnley finished 9th in the League and Burnley conceded 62 goals in 22 games, the second worst defence of 1888-1889.
