= James Woods (disambiguation) =

James Woods (born 1947) is an American film and television actor.

James, Jim, or Jimmy Woods may also refer to:

== Law and politics ==
- James H. Woods (fl. 1833), American politician
- James B. Woods (died 1875), Canadian politician
- James P. Woods (1868–1948), American politician
- James Frank Woods (1872–1930), Hawaiian politician

== Sports ==
- James Woods (footballer) (fl. 1880s), English footballer
- Jimmy Woods (footballer) (1892-1974), English footballer, see List of Bury F.C. players (1–24 appearances)
- Jimmy Woods (American football) (1894–1966), American football player
- Jim Woods (1916–1988), American sportscaster
- Jim Woods (baseball) (born 1939), American baseball player
- James Woods (freestyle skier) (born 1992), British freestyle skier

== Others ==
- J. D. Woods (James Dominick Woods, 1826–1905), Australian journalist and author
- James Woods (Canadian business executive) (1855–1941), Canadian industrialist and philanthropist
- James Park Woods (1886–1963), Australian soldier
- Jimmy Woods (1934–2018), American jazz musician
- James S. Woods (born 1940), American toxicologist and epidemiologist
- James A. Woods (born 1979), Canadian actor

== See also ==
- James Wood (disambiguation)
