= Tom Nicol =

Scottish footballer (1870–1915)

Personal information
- Date of birth: 24 February 1870
- Place of birth: Whitburn, West Lothian, Scotland
- Date of death: 10 June 1915 (aged 45)
- Place of death: Woolston, Southampton, England
- Positions: Centre forward; full back

Youth career
- Cardross Swifts
- Broxburn Athletic
- Mossend Swifts

Senior career*
Years	Team	Apps	(Gls)
1891–1896	Burnley	140	(42)
1896–1897	Blackburn Rovers	16	(2)
1897–1899	Southampton	25	(1)
1902–1903	Southampton Wanderers		
- * Club domestic league appearances and goals

Thomas Nicol (24 February 1870 – 10 June 1915) was a Scottish footballer who played for Burnley first as a centre forward and then as a full back in the 1890s, before later becoming a bowls champion in Southampton.

== Football career ==
=== Burnley ===
Nicol was born in Whitburn, West Lothian and after playing local football in Scotland with Mossend Swifts, he was one of several Scottish players recruited by Burnley. For his Burnley debut on 7 March 1891 he replaced leading scorer Claude Lambie, who had returned to Scotland, and scored a hat-trick in a 6–2 victory over Preston North End. Preston had won the Football League in each of the two preceding years, but the defeat at Turf Moor resulted in them finishing the 1890–91 as runners-up, two points behind Everton.

In 1891 a team representing Canada embarked on an extensive tour of Britain, playing over twenty games against both club and national teams. The game against Burnley took place on 31 October 1891 at Turf Moor, and at the time Burnley were lying eighth in the Football League. Despite fielding England goalkeeper Jack Hillman, Burnley were held to a 2–2 draw, even though Nicol twice giving Burnley the lead.

A few weeks later, Nicol was one of three goal-scorers in a 3–0 victory over Blackburn Rovers, this being the first league victory for Burnley against their local rivals, ensuring that his name would be entered "in any (Burnley) hall of fame". The match on 12 December 1891 was played in terrible conditions, having snowed for more than two hours before kick-off. Nicol forced the ball over the line after a goalmouth scramble ensued from James Matthew's cross, with only seven minutes on the clock. Nicol was also involved in the build-up to the second goal, scored by Hugh Galbraith, while the third was scored by Billy Bowes after 35 minutes, although Rovers' goalkeeper, Herby Arthur contested the goal, claiming that the ball had not crossed the line. Rovers were reluctant to come out for the second half, in which they would be playing into the wind, and only seven players appeared for the restart. After Burnley's captain, Alex Stewart, and Blackburn's Joe Lofthouse had been sent off for fighting, the remaining Rovers players, with the exception of goalkeeper Arthur, walked off the pitch in protest. After a few farcical minutes, when Burnley's scored a "goal" which was disallowed as offside, the referee, Charles Clegg, abandoned the match with the scoreline at 3–0.

On 9 January 1892, Nicol and fellow forward Alex McLardie both scored hat-tricks in a 9–0 victory over Darwen. For the 1891–92 season, Nicol was Burnley's top scorer, with 17 goals from 25 league appearances as they finished seventh in the table.

For the next two seasons, Nicol played at right-back before moving forward to outside-right for the 1894–95 season. Nicol again found his goal-scoring form and was the club's top-scorer for the season with 11 league goals from 22 appearances. He made a further contribution of eight goals in the 1895–96 season including a hat-trick in a 6–0 defeat of Blackburn Rovers on 13 April 1886.

The following November, Nicol joined Burnley's arch-rivals, Blackburn Rovers; in his 5 full seasons with Burnley he made a total of 150 appearances, scoring 45 goals.

=== Blackburn Rovers ===
Nicol stayed with Blackburn Rovers until the end of the 1896–97 season, scoring twice from 19 league and cup appearances, before moving to the south coast to join Southern League Southampton in the 1897 close season.

=== Southampton ===
At the "Saints", Nicol reverted to the right-back position lining up alongside Harry Haynes; their defensive prowess helped Southampton to retain their Southern League title, conceding only 18 goals from 22 matches. He made his debut on 2 October 1897, with Samuel Meston moving forward to right-half to accommodate him, thus displacing William McMillan, who had been ever-present in the previous season. The Saints also reached the 1898 FA Cup semi-final, where they were defeated by Nottingham Forest in rather controversial circumstances after goalkeeper George Clawley had his eyes "choked with snow" and conceded two goals in the final minutes of the game.

Nicol was "completely fearless, even reckless (and) usually won the ball irrespective of obstacles" and became "one of the finest backs ever to don the cherry and white shirt". Injury resulted in him losing his place to Peter Durber in October 1898, although he did make two appearances at outside-left later that season (replacing Tom Smith), in which the Saints claimed the championship for the third consecutive season.

He retired at the end of the 1898–99 season, having made 37 appearances for Southampton, scoring twice.

== After football ==
On his retirement, he became the landlord of the Kingsland Tavern in St Mary's Street. He sold the pub in 1901 to fellow Southampton footballer Harry Brown and later took over a pub in Portsmouth.

== Bowls ==
Nicol became a bowls player of some repute and in 1907 he became a "knight" by winning the 133rd annual championship at the Southampton Old Bowling Green, which is the world's oldest surviving bowling green having been first used in 1299.

== Honours ==
Southampton

- Southern League championship: 1897–98 and 1898–99
