= Hugh Galbraith =

Hugh Galbraith may refer to:

- Hugh Galbraith (footballer)
- Hugh Galbraith (rugby union)
