= James Wood =

James or Jim Wood may refer to:

== Politics and government ==
- James Wood (governor) (1741–1813), Governor of Virginia and officer in the American Revolutionary War
- James Wood (New York politician) (1820–1892), New York politician and Union Army general
- James Wood (Irish politician) (1865–1936), Member of Parliament for East Down, 1902–1906
- Jim Wood (California politician) (born 1960), member of the California State Assembly
- Jim Wood (Arkansas politician) (fl. late 20th century), State Auditor of Arkansas
- Sebastian Wood (James Sebastian Lamin Wood, born 1961), British Ambassador to Germany

== Sport ==
- James Wood (baseball) (born 2002), American baseball player
- James Wood (footballer) (1893–?), professional footballer, who played for South Shields, Huddersfield Town and Blackpool
- James Wood (Lancashire cricketer) (1933–1977), English cricketer for Lancashire 1954–56
- James Wood (New Zealand cricketer) (1854–1937), New Zealand cricketer
- James Wood (South African cricketer) (born 1985), South African cricketer, played for Durham UCCE
- Jamie Wood (born 1978), footballer
- Jim Wood (American football) (born 1936), American gridiron football player and coach
- Jim Wood (biathlete) (1952–2020), British Olympic biathlete
- Jim Wood (Sussex cricketer) (1914–1989), English cricketer, played for Sussex 1936–55
- Jimmy Wood (1842–1927), American baseball player and manager
- James Wood (athlete) (1906–1999), Scottish long-distance runner

== Religion ==
- James Wood (mathematician) (1760–1839), Dean of Ely 1820–1839
- James Wood (minister) (1672–1759), Presbyterian minister of Atherton and Chowbent Chapels in Atherton, Greater Manchester, England
- James Frederick Wood (1813–1883), Archbishop of Philadelphia
- James Julius Wood (1800–1877), Scottish minister

== Military ==
- James Wood (Canadian admiral) (1934–2020), Canadian admiral
- James Athol Wood (1756–1829), British rear-admiral
- James W. Wood (1924–1990), U.S. Air Force colonel and senior test pilot on the Dyna-Soar program
- Sir James Wood, 2nd Baronet (died 1738), Scottish officer of the Dutch States Army and later the British Army
- James Wood (Royal Navy officer) (died 1860), commander of HMS Pandora during its commission at the Royal Navy's Pacific Station

== Others ==
- James Wood (musician) (born 1953), British composer and percussionist
- James Wood (critic) (born 1965), British literary critic and novelist
- James Wood (encyclopaedist) (1820–1901), British editor of The Nuttall Encyclopaedia
- James Wood, Lord Irwin (born 1977), British courtesy peer
- James Edward Wood (1947–2004), American murderer
- James N. Wood (1941–2010), American director of the Art Institute of Chicago
- James Roland Wood (born 1941), Australian Royal Commissioner and jurist
- James Rushmore Wood (1816–1882), American physician
- Jim Wood (fiddler) (born 1964), American fiddler
- James Wood (engineer), American engineer
- James Wood Bush (c. 1844–1906), Hawaiian-American Civil War combatant
- James Wood (screenwriter), British screenwriter

== See also ==
- James Woods (disambiguation)
