= List of Burnley F.C. records and statistics =

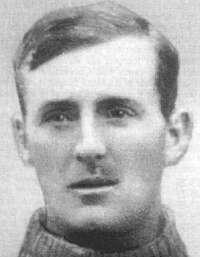
Jerry Dawson holds the record for most Burnley appearances, with 569.

Burnley Football Club is an English professional association football club based in the town of Burnley, Lancashire. Founded on 18 May 1882, the club was one of the first to become professional (in 1883), putting pressure on the Football Association (FA) to permit payments to players. In 1885, the FA legalised professionalism, so the team entered the FA Cup for the first time in 1885–86, and were one of the twelve founding members of the Football League in 1888–89. Burnley have played in all four professional divisions of English football from 1888 to the present day. The team have been champions of England twice, in 1920–21 and 1959–60, have won the FA Cup once, in 1913–14, and have won the FA Charity Shield twice, in 1960 and 1973. Burnley are one of only five teams to have won all four professional divisions of English football, along with Wolverhampton Wanderers, Preston North End, Sheffield United and Portsmouth. They were the second to achieve this by winning the Fourth Division in the 1991–92 season.

The list encompasses the honours won by Burnley, records set by the club, its managers and its players. The record for most games played for the club is held by Jerry Dawson, who made 569 appearances between 1907 and 1928. George Beel scored 188 goals during his Burnley career and is the club's record goalscorer. William Tait scored Burnley's first hat-trick in the Football League in 1888, which was also the first league hat-trick worldwide. Jimmy McIlroy made 51 appearances for Northern Ireland and so is the player who gained the most caps while with Burnley. The highest transfer fee paid by the club is the circa £23 million paid to Chelsea for Lesley Ugochukwu in 2025; the highest fee received is the £31 million paid by Manchester City for James Trafford in 2025. The highest attendance recorded at home ground Turf Moor was 54,775 for the visit of Huddersfield Town in a third round FA Cup match in 1924.

During the 2024–25 season, Burnley matched or broke several English league records, including the best defensive record in history (16 goals conceded in 46 matches, an average of 0.35 per game), the joint-most clean sheets (30, equalling Port Vale's 1953–54 side), becoming the first team to avoid conceding more than one goal in any league fixture, and the first to twice gain at least 100 points in a specific division (EFL Championship; 101 in 2022–23 and 100 in 2024–25).

All records and statistics are correct as of the 2025–26 season.

== Honours and achievements ==
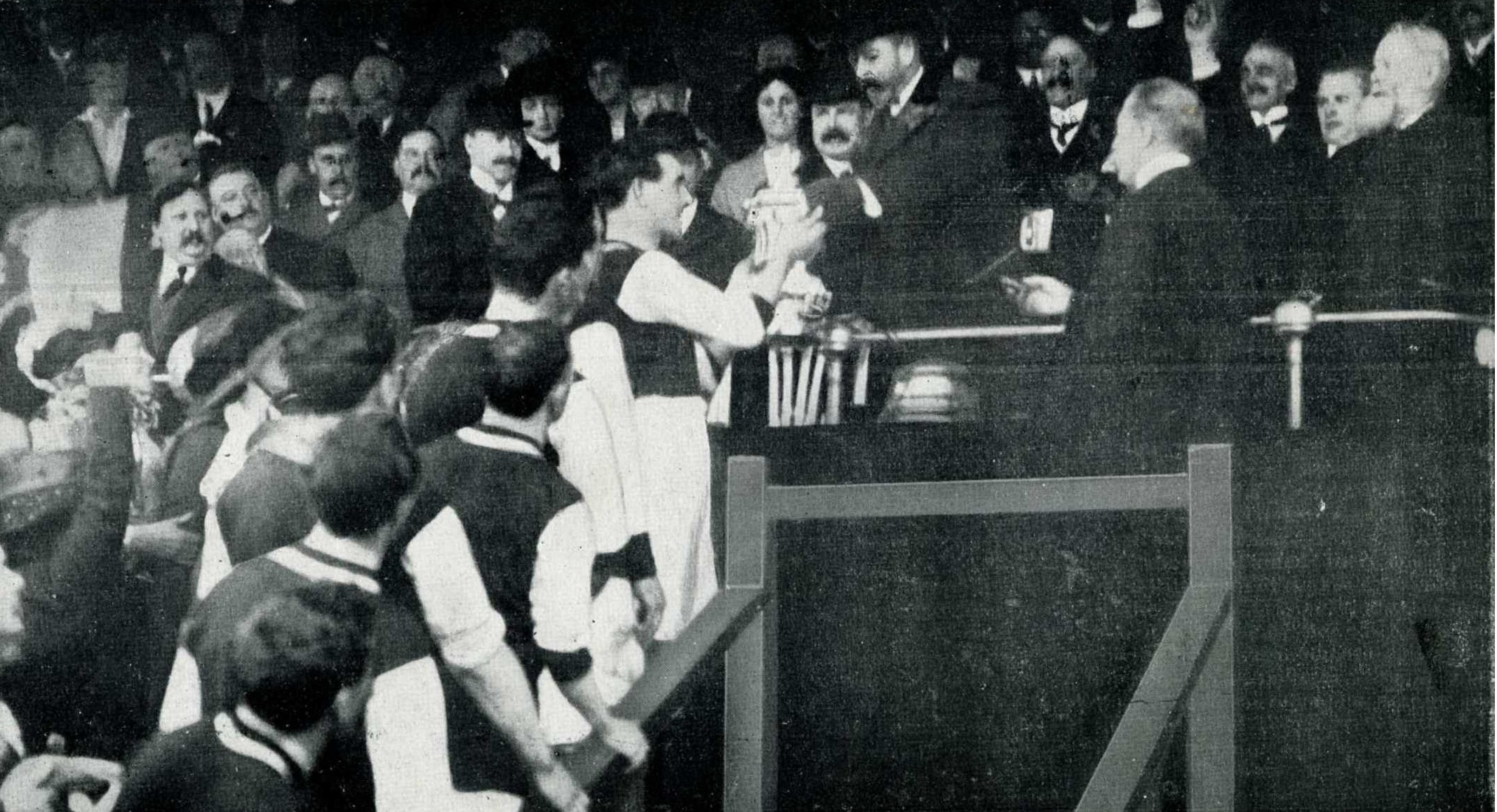
The FA Cup trophy is presented to Burnley captain Tommy Boyle by King George V in 1914

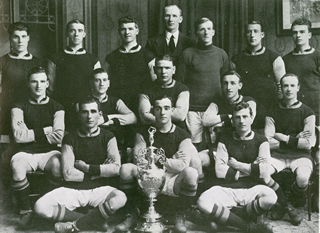
Team photograph of the 1920–21 First Division-winning side

Burnley won their first honour in 1883, when they won the Dr Dean's Cup, a knockout competition between amateur clubs in the Burnley area. The club turned professional by the end of 1883, and was one of the twelve founder members of the Football League in 1888. Burnley reached their first major final in 1914, beating Liverpool 1–0 in the FA Cup final. Burnley have been champions of England two times, in 1920–21 and 1959–60, and have won the Charity Shield twice, in 1960 and 1973. The side have competed in one of the four professional levels of English football from 1888 to the present day. They were the second, and are one of only five teams to have won all four tiers, along with Wolverhampton Wanderers, Preston North End, Sheffield United and Portsmouth. Burnley's honours include the following:

=== League ===
First Division (Tier 1) (Note: Upon its formation in 1992, the Premier League became the top tier of English football; the Football League First, Second and Third Divisions then became the second, third and fourth tiers, respectively. From 2004, the First Division became the Championship, the Second Division became League One and the Third Division became League Two.)

- Winners: 1920–21, 1959–60
- Runners–up: 1919–20, 1961–62

Second Division/Championship (Tier 2)

- Winners: 1897–98, 1972–73, 2015–16, 2022–23
- Promoted: 1912–13, 1946–47, 2013–14, 2024–25
- Play–off winners: 2008–09

Third Division/Second Division (Tier 3)

- Winners: 1981–82
- Promoted: 1999–2000
- Play–off winners: 1993–94

Fourth Division (Tier 4)

- Winners: 1991–92

=== Cup ===
FA Cup

- Winners: 1913–14
- Runners–up: 1946–47, 1961–62

FA Charity Shield

- Winners: 1960 (shared), (Note: Until 1993, in the event of a draw, the Charity Shield would be shared between the two competing teams, with each team having possession of the trophy for six months. Burnley and Wolverhampton Wanderers drew 2–2.) 1973 (Note: The 1972–73 First Division champions Liverpool and the 1972–73 FA Cup winners Sunderland declined to compete in the 1973 FA Charity Shield, so Manchester City—the reigning holders of the Shield—and Second Division champions Burnley played instead. Burnley defeated City 1–0.)
- Runners–up: 1921

Texaco Cup

- Runners–up: 1973–74

Anglo-Scottish Cup

- Winners: 1978–79

Associate Members' Cup

- Runners–up: 1987–88

Budapest Cup

- Runners–up: 1914

Allison Trophy

- Winners: 1961, 1962

==== Regional ====
Lancashire Cup (Note: The club has fielded its reserve team in the competition since the mid-1990s.)

- Winners (14): 1889–90, 1914–15, 1949–50, 1951–52, 1959–60, 1960–61, 1961–62, 1964–65, 1965–66, 1969–70, 1971–72, 1992–93, 2022–23, 2025–26
- Runners–up (15): 1899–1900, 1900–01, 1901–02, 1910–11, 1911–12, 1929–30, 1940–41, 1945–46, 1956–57, 1967–68, 1985–86, 2018–19, 2021–22, 2023–24, 2024–25

Dr Dean's Cup

- Winners: 1883

Hospital Cup

- Winners: 1883–84, 1885–86, (Note: Burnley were declared winners of the 1885–86 edition after opponents Haggate refused to play the final. According to the Burnley Express, Haggate felt "that they had no prospect of successfully competing against the premier Burnley eleven".) 1887–88, 1889–90

East Lancashire Charity Cup

- Winners (15): 1892–93, 1893–94, 1898–99, 1904–05, 1905–06, 1906–07, 1907–08, 1911–12, 1914–15, 1919–20, 1920–21, 1921–22, 1923–24 (shared), 1927–28 (shared), 1930–31 (Note: The 1930–31 edition was won by Burnley's reserves.)
- Runners–up (7): 1890–91, 1901–02, 1910–11, 1922–23, 1925–26, 1926–27, 1928–29

== Club records ==
=== Season records ===
- Most league wins in a season: 29 in 46 matches, Championship, 2022–23
- Fewest league wins in a season: 4, Football League, 1889–90 (22 matches), and Premier League, 2025–26 (38 games)
- Most league draws in a season: 17 in 46 matches, Third Division, 1981–82
- Fewest league draws in a season: 3 in 22 matches, Football League, 1888–89 and 1890–91
- Most league defeats in a season: 24 in 38 matches, Premier League, 2009–10, 2023–24 and 2025–26
- Fewest league defeats in a season: 2, Second Division, 1897–98 (30 matches), and Championship, 2024–25 (46 games)

=== Points ===
- Most points in a season:
  - Two points for a win: 62 in 42 matches, Second Division, 1972–73
  - Three points for a win: 101 in 46 matches, Championship, 2022–23 (Note: Burnley gained 100 points in 2024–25, becoming the first side in English league history to twice reach a three-figure points total in a specific division (EFL Championship).)
- Fewest points in a season:
  - Two points for a win: 13 in 22 matches, Football League, 1889–90
  - Three points for a win: 22 in 38 matches, Premier League, 2025–26

=== Goals ===
- Most league goals scored in a season: 102 in 42 matches, First Division, 1960–61
- Fewest league goals scored in a season: 28 in 38 matches, Premier League, 2014–15
- Most league goals conceded in a season: 108 in 42 matches, First Division, 1925–26
- Fewest league goals conceded in a season: 16 in 46 matches, Championship, 2024–25 (Note: During the 2024–25 season, the team conceded only 16 goals in 46 matches—an average of 0.35 per game—setting the best defensive record in English league history. Burnley also became the first side in English football history not to concede more than one goal in any league fixture throughout an entire season.)

=== Clean sheets ===
- Most clean sheets in a league season: 30 in 46 matches, Championship, 2024–25 (Note: Also an English record, tied with Port Vale (1953–54))
- Longest run without conceding a goal (league): 12 matches (1,214 minutes); 26 December 2024 to 21 February 2025, Championship (Note: Also an English second tier record)

=== Match records ===
==== Firsts ====
- First recorded match: Burnley 4–0 Burnley Wanderers, friendly, 10 August 1882
- First match at Turf Moor: Burnley 3–6 Rawtenstall, 17 February 1883
- First FA Cup match: Darwen Old Wanderers 11–0 Burnley, first round, 17 October 1885 (Note: Because of the then-restricted rules on professionalism in the FA Cup, Burnley fielded their reserve team against Darwen Old Wanderers. Burnley's first team played a friendly match against Wolverhampton Wanderers on the same day, with Burnley winning 4–1.)
- First league match: Preston North End 5–2 Burnley, 8 September 1888
- First League Cup match: Cardiff City 0–4 Burnley, second round, 24 October 1960
- First European Cup match: Burnley 2–0 Stade de Reims, second round, 16 November 1960

==== Record wins ====
- Record win: Burnley 15–0 Haydock, Lancashire Cup, second round, 20 January 1890
- Record league win: Burnley 9–0 Darwen, Football League, 9 January 1892
- Record away win: Tananarive 1–14 Burnley, in Madagascar, friendly, 9 May 1954
- Record league away win: Birmingham 1–7 Burnley, First Division, 10 April 1926
- Record FA Cup win:
  - Burnley 9–0 Crystal Palace, second round, 10 February 1909
  - Burnley 9–0 New Brighton, fourth round, 26 January 1957
  - Penrith 0–9 Burnley, first round, 17 November 1984
- Record League Cup win: Burnley 6–0 Grimsby Town, second round, 10 September 1968
- Record European win: Burnley 5–0 Lausanne-Sports, Inter-Cities Fairs Cup second round, 25 October 1966

==== Record defeats ====
- Record defeat: Darwen Old Wanderers 11–0 Burnley, FA Cup first round, 17 October 1885
- Record league defeat:
  - Aston Villa 10–0 Burnley, First Division, 29 August 1925
  - Sheffield United 10–0 Burnley, First Division, 19 January 1929
- Record league home defeat:
  - Burnley 1–7 Blackburn Rovers, Football League, 3 November 1888
  - Burnley 0–6 Hereford United, Fourth Division, 24 January 1987
  - Burnley 0–6 Manchester City, Second Division (third tier), 9 March 1999
- Record League Cup defeat: Manchester City 5–0 Burnley, first round, 11 August 1999
- Record European defeat: Hamburger SV 4–1 Burnley, European Cup quarter-final, 15 March 1961

==== Streaks ====
- Longest winning streak (all competitions): 11 matches; 16 November 1912 to 18 January 1913, Second Division (10 matches) and FA Cup (one match)
- Longest winning streak at home (all competitions): 18 matches; 6 September 1920 to 2 April 1921, First Division (17 matches) and FA Cup (one match)
- Longest winning streak from home (all competitions): 7 matches; 12 October 1991 to 1 January 1992, Fourth Division (six matches) and FA Cup (one match)
- Longest unbeaten run (league): 33 matches; 7 November 2024 to 3 May 2025, Championship
- Longest unbeaten run (top tier): 30 matches; 6 September 1920 to 25 March 1921, First Division (Note: It stood as a record for unbeaten league games in a single season in English professional football until Arsenal went unbeaten through the whole of the 2003–04 Premier League season.)
- Longest unbeaten run at home (league): 34 matches; 1 April 1911 to 4 January 1913, Second Division
- Longest unbeaten run from home (league): 16 matches; from 7 November 2024 to 26 April 2025, Championship
- Longest drawing streak (league): 6 matches; 21 February to 28 March 1931, Second Division
- Longest losing streak (league): 8 matches;
  - 9 November 1889 to 22 February 1890, Football League
  - 16 March to 2 September 1895, First Division
  - 2 January to 25 February 1995, First Division (second tier)
- Longest streak without a win (league): 24 matches; 16 April to 17 November 1979, Second Division
- Longest scoring run (league): 31 matches; 16 August 2022 to 25 February 2023, Championship
- Longest non-scoring run (league): 6 matches;
  - 9 August to 7 September 1997, Second Division (third tier)
  - 23 December 2006 to 30 January 2007, Championship
  - 21 March to 2 May 2015, Premier League

==== Attendances ====
- Highest attendance in a match involving Burnley: 100,000; versus Tottenham Hotspur at Wembley in the 1962 FA Cup final
- Highest home attendance: 54,775; versus Huddersfield Town in the FA Cup third round on 23 February 1924
- Highest home attendance in a league match: 52,869; versus Blackpool in the First Division on 11 October 1947
- Highest average home attendance: 33,621; in the First Division in 1947–48
- Lowest league home attendance: 1,696; versus Colchester United in the Fourth Division on 4 November 1986

== Managerial records ==
- First full-time manager: Harry Bradshaw; August 1894 to June 1899
- Longest serving manager (time and games): Harry Potts; 745 competitive matches, February 1958 to February 1970 and February 1977 to October 1979
- First manager from outside England: Frank Hill; Scottish, managed the club for 257 competitive matches from October 1948 to August 1954
- Most wins: Harry Potts; 321 competitive matches (from 745)

== Player records ==
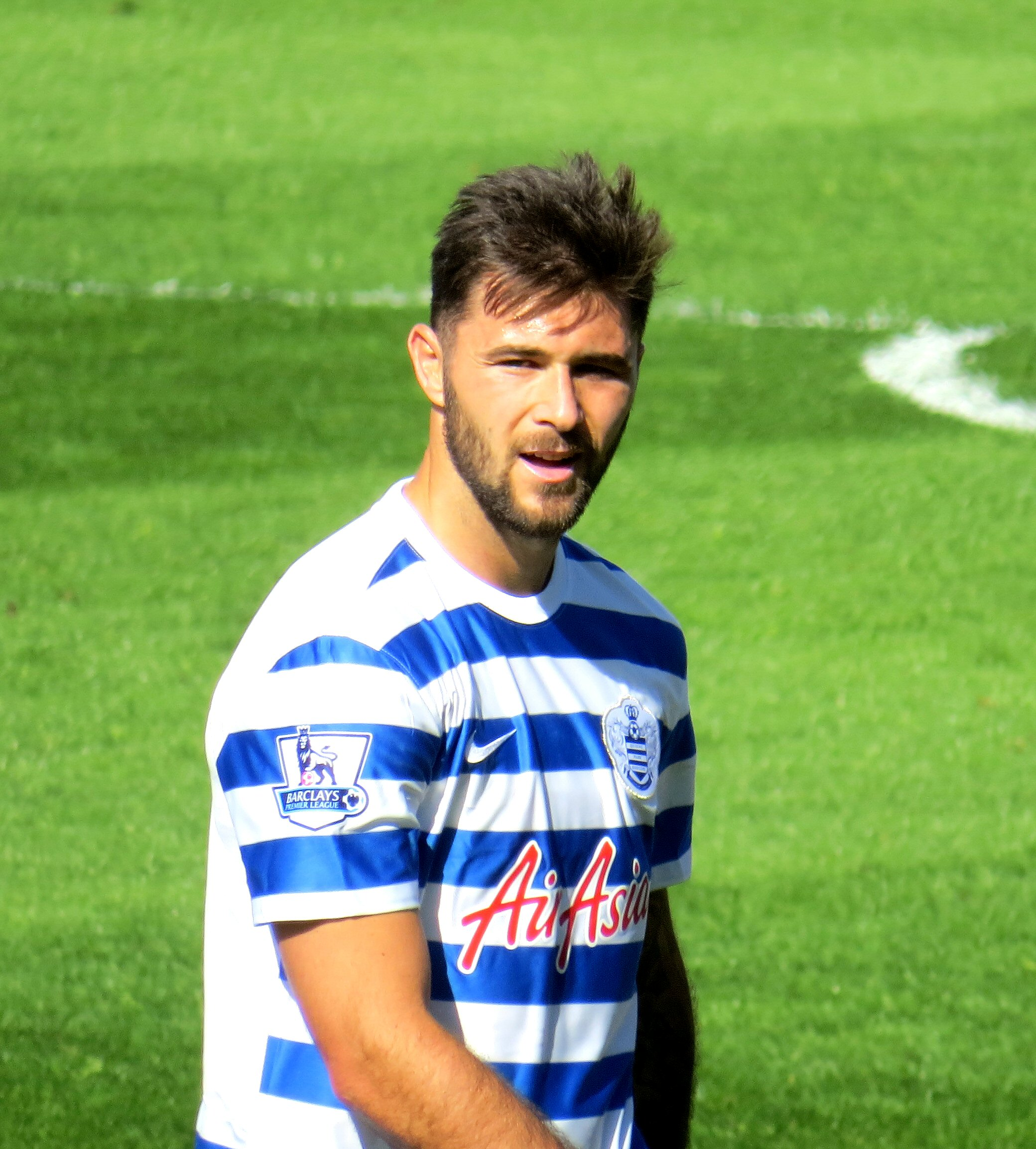
Charlie Austin (here playing for Queens Park Rangers in 2015) scored in a tied club record eight consecutive matches.

=== Award winners ===
- FWA Footballer of the Year
  - Jimmy Adamson – 1961–62
- First tier top goal scorer
  - Willie Irvine – 1965–66

=== Appearances ===
- Youngest first-team player: Tommy Lawton; 16 years, 174 days (against Doncaster Rovers, Second Division, 28 March 1936)
- Oldest first-team player: Len Smelt; 41 years, 132 days (against Arsenal, First Division, 18 April 1925)
- Most consecutive league appearances: 203 – Jimmy Strong, 31 August 1946 – 23 March 1951

==== Most appearances ====
Competitive first-team appearances only; substitute appearances appear in parentheses; they are in addition to the figures before the brackets and are not included within them.
¤ —Played their full career at Burnley

No.	Name	Nation	Years	League	FA Cup	League Cup	Other (Note: The "Other" column constitutes goals and appearances (including those as a substitute) in the Charity Shield, European Cup, Inter-Cities Fairs Cup, Texaco Cup, Watney Cup, Anglo-Scottish Cup, Football League Group Cup, Football League Trophy, and play-offs.)	Total
1	Jerry Dawson	England	1907–1929 ¤	522 (0)	46 (0)	0 (0)	1 (0)	569 (0)
2	Alan Stevenson	England	1972–1983	438 (0)	33 (0)	36 (0)	36 (0)	543 (0)
3	John Angus	England	1955–1972 ¤	438 (1)	45 (0)	25 (0)	12 (0)	520 (1)
4=	Jimmy McIlroy	Northern Ireland	1950–1963	439 (0)	50 (0)	3 (0)	5 (0)	497 (0)
4=	Martin Dobson	England	1967–1974; 1979–1984	406 (4)	31 (0)	34 (0)	22 (0)	493 (4)
6	Jimmy Adamson	England	1947–1964 ¤	426 (0)	52 (0)	3 (0)	5 (0)	486 (0)
7	Tommy Cummings	England	1947–1963	434 (0)	38 (0)	6 (0)	1 (0)	479 (0)
8	Brian Miller	England	1954–1967 ¤	379 (0)	50 (0)	13 (0)	13 (0)	455 (0)
9	Fred Barron	England	1898–1911	400 (0)	23 (0)	0 (0)	0 (0)	423 (0)
10	Leighton James	Wales	1970–1975; 1978–1980; 1986–1989	331 (5)	17 (0)	22 (0)	23 (1)	393 (6)

=== Goalscorers ===
- Most goals in a season in all competitions: 37 goals;
  - Jimmy Robson (25 in the First Division, five in the FA Cup, four in the League Cup, and three in the European Cup), 1960–61
  - Willie Irvine (29 in the First Division, five in the FA Cup, and three in the League Cup), 1965–66
- Most league goals in a season: George Beel – 35, First Division, 1927–28
- Most goals in a league match: Louis Page – 6, versus Birmingham away (First Division, 10 April 1926)
- Most consecutive matches scored in: 8 – Ray Pointer (First Division and FA Cup, 29 November 1958 to 14 January 1959) and Charlie Austin (Championship and League Cup, 15 September 2012 to 23 October 2012)
- Most seasons as top goalscorer: George Beel – 6, 1923–24, 1926–27, 1927–28, 1928–29, 1930–31, 1931–32
- Most goals on debut: Ian Lawson – 4, versus Chesterfield (FA Cup third round, 5 January 1957)
- First goal in the FA Cup: Walter Place, versus Astley Bridge away (first round, 23 October 1886)
- First goal in league football: Pat Gallocher (21st minute), versus Preston North End away (Football League, 8 September 1888)
- First hat-trick (league): William Tait, versus Bolton Wanderers away (Football League, 15 September 1888) (Note: Also the first hat-trick in league football worldwide)
- Most hat-tricks: George Beel – 11, between 1923 and 1931
- Fastest hat-trick: Louis Page – 3 minutes, versus Birmingham away (First Division, 10 April 1926) (Note: Page scored two hat-tricks (six goals) during the match; he scored three in the first half (minutes 22, 29 and 44) and three after the interval (minutes 59, 60 and 62).)

==== Overall scorers ====
Competitive first-team matches only; appearances including substitute appearances appear in parentheses and italics.

No.	Name	Nation	Years	League	FA Cup	League Cup	Other	Total
1	George Beel	England	1923–1932	179 (316)	9 (21)	0 (0)	0 (0)	188 (337)
2	Ray Pointer	England	1957–1965	118 (223)	12 (35)	2 (7)	0 (5)	132 (270)
3	Jimmy McIlroy	Northern Ireland	1950–1963	116 (439)	13 (50)	1 (3)	1 (5)	131 (497)
4	Andy Lochhead	Scotland	1958–1968	101 (226)	12 (19)	9 (15)	6 (6)	128 (266)
5=	Bert Freeman	England	1911–1921	103 (166)	12 (23)	0 (0)	0 (0)	115 (189)
5=	Louis Page	England	1925–1932	111 (248)	4 (11)	0 (0)	0 (0)	115 (259)
7	John Connelly	England	1956–1964	85 (215)	15 (38)	2 (7)	2 (5)	104 (265)
8	Jimmy Robson	England	1956–1965	79 (202)	14 (29)	4 (6)	3 (5)	100 (242)
9=	Willie Irvine	Northern Ireland	1960–1968	78 (126)	9 (10)	8 (9)	2 (3)	97 (148)
9=	Bob Kelly	England	1913–1925	88 (277)	9 (21)	0 (0)	0 (1)	97 (299)

=== Internationals ===
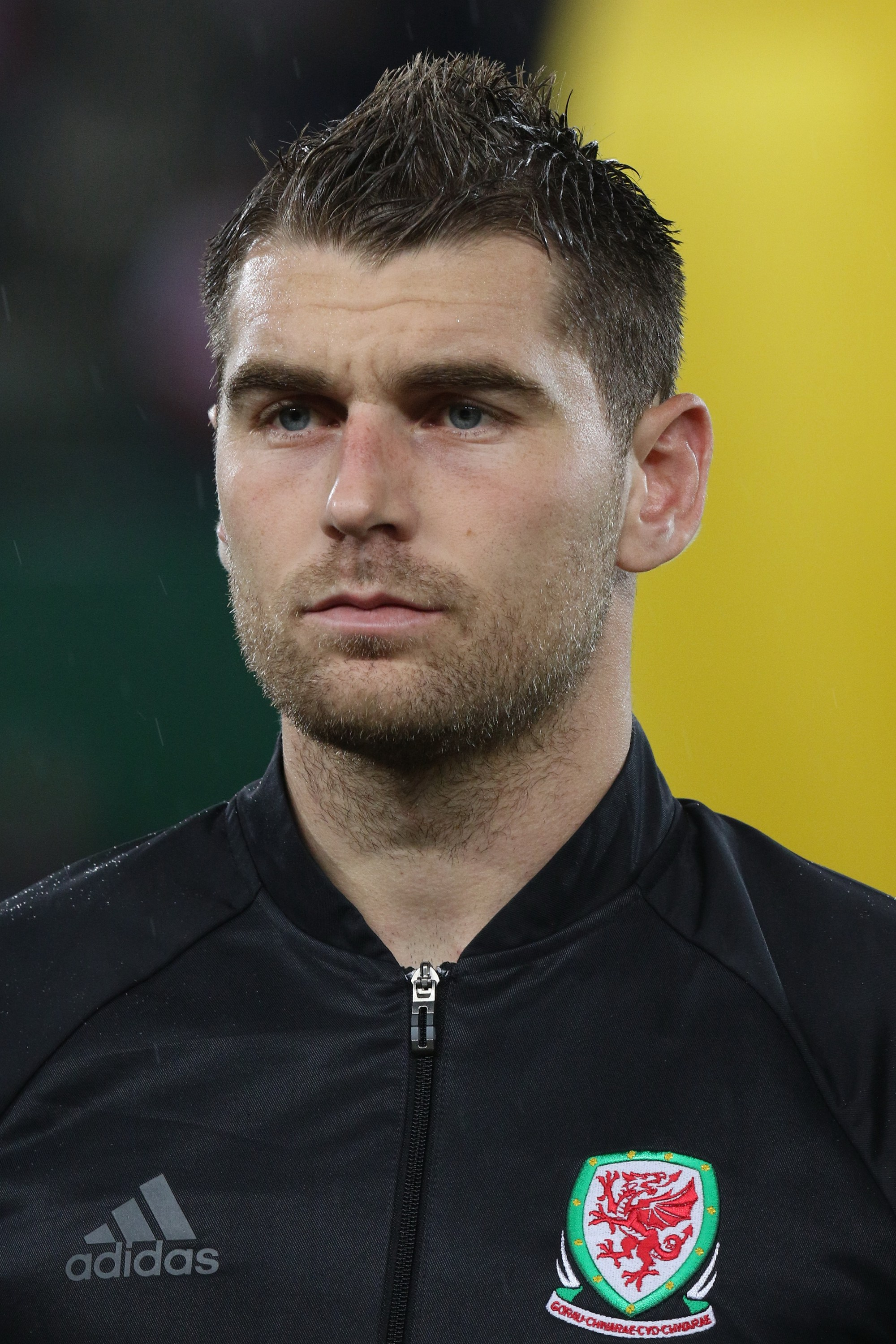
Sam Vokes won 40 caps and scored 7 goals for Wales while at Burnley. At UEFA Euro 2016, he scored against Belgium in the quarter-finals, with Wales winning 3–1 and reaching the semi-finals of a major tournament for the first time.

This section refers only to caps earned while a Burnley player.

- First capped player: Jack Yates; for England against Ireland on 2 March 1889
- First international goalscorer: Jack Yates; for England against Ireland on 2 March 1889 (three goals)
- Burnley-born players who won caps while at the club:
  - Jimmy Crabtree; three caps in 1894 and 1895
  - Billy Bannister; one cap in 1901
- First non-English international: Tommy Morrison won four caps for Ireland between 1899 and 1902
- Most capped player: Jimmy McIlroy; 51 appearances for Northern Ireland
- Most capped player for England: Bob Kelly; 11 caps
- First player to appear in the World Cup finals: Jock Aird; for Scotland against Austria in Zürich on 16 June 1954
- First player to appear in the World Cup finals for England: Colin McDonald; against the Soviet Union in Gothenburg on 8 June 1958
- First player to score in the World Cup finals: Billy Hamilton for Northern Ireland against Austria in Madrid on 1 July 1982 (two goals)

=== Transfers ===
The author David Wiseman wrote in 2009 that Burnley had "always sold more than bought players due to the constant tight financial budget". This changed following Burnley's promotion to the Premier League in 2009, as increased broadcast revenue significantly strengthened their finances and enabled them to break their transfer record several times during subsequent spells in the top flight.

One of the earliest recorded transfer fees in the club's history came in 1895, when Jimmy Crabtree moved to Aston Villa for £250 (equivalent to £30,000 in 2025 (Note: UK Consumer Price Index inflation figures from 1209–2024 based on data from "Inflation calculator". Bank of England. London. 18 February 2026.)), a fee that may have been an English record at the time. Burnley-born Crabtree was the club's captain, and the Northern Whig wrote after his death in 1908 that he was "considered by many good judges of the game to be the greatest association football player of all time". A Burnley player has broken the world transfer record once: in 1925, Bob Kelly moved to Sunderland for a then-record fee of £6,500 (equivalent to £340,000 in 2025). The club received its first six-figure transfer fee in 1968 through the sale of Willie Morgan to Manchester United, while Tony Morley became Burnley's first £100,000 signing eight years later. Ian Moore was Burnley's first £1m signing in 2000, while Robbie Blake and Richard Chaplow became the first and second £1m sales respectively in January 2005.

- Record transfer fee paid by Burnley: c. £23m for Lesley Ugochukwu from Chelsea in August 2025
- Record transfer fee received by the club: £31m (Note: Including add-ons and a sell-on clause; a British record fee for a goalkeeper) for James Trafford from Manchester City in July 2025
- In 1925, when Bob Kelly moved from Burnley to Sunderland for £6,500 (equivalent to £340,000 in 2025), he broke the world transfer record.
