= William McKay (disambiguation) =

William McKay (1772–1832) was a Canadian soldier and administrator.

William or Bill McKay may also refer to:

- William McKay (footballer), Scottish footballer
- William McKay (parliamentary official) (born 1939), British government administrator, Clerk of the House of Commons
- William McKay (politician) (1847–1915), Canadian Senator representing Nova Scotia
- Bill McKay (footballer, born 1906) (1906–1977), Scottish association footballer
- Bill McKay (Australian footballer) (1879–1950), Australian rules footballer
- Bill McKay (rugby union) (1921–1997), Irish rugby union player
- Billy Mckay, Northern Irish footballer
- William Cameron McKay (1824–1893), U.S. Army officer, scout, physician and surgeon
- Bill McKay, fictional politician played by Robert Redford in The Candidate (1972 film)

== See also ==
- William Mackay (disambiguation)
- William McKee (disambiguation)
- William McKie (disambiguation)
