= Bob Duckworth =

Bob Duckworth may refer to:

- Bobby Duckworth (born 1958), American football player
- Robert Duckworth (1870–1924), English footballer
- Bob Duckworth (speedway rider) (born 1929), New Zealand speedway rider
