= John Brodie (footballer, died 1901) =

Scottish footballer

Personal information
- Place of birth: Kilmarnock, Scotland
- Date of death: 1901
- Position: Inside forward

Senior career*
| Years | Team | Apps | (Gls) |
| 18xx–1890 | Kilmarnock | ? | (?) |
| 1890–1891 | Burnley | 2 | (0) |
| 1891–18xx | Kilmarnock | ? | (?) |
| 1892–1893 | Third Lanark | 12 | (5) |
| 18xx–1893 | Kilmarnock | ? | (?) |
| 1893–1894 | Nottingham Forest | 9 | (5) |
| 1894–18xx | Kilmarnock | ? | (?) |
| 18xx–18xx | Kilmarnock Athletic | ? | (?) |
- * Club domestic league appearances and goals

John C. Brodie (died 1901) was a Scottish professional footballer who played as an inside forward. Born in Kilmarnock, he was playing for his hometown club when he was signed by Football League side Burnley in November 1890. Brodie made his debut for the club in the 0–7 defeat away at Preston North End on 2 February 1891, in place of the regular right-inside forward Alexander McLardie. He was also selected for the following match, a 0–4 loss to Notts County, but did not appear again for Burnley and returned to Kilmarnock in March 1891.

Brodie then had a spell at Third Lanark, before moving back to England with Nottingham Forest where he scored five goals in nine league appearances. In 1894, he returned to Kilmarnock for a fourth spell, before ending his career with amateur side Kilmarnock Athletic.
