= Leighton James =

Welsh footballer (1953–2024)

- James with Wales

Personal information
- Date of birth: 16 February 1953
- Place of birth: Loughor, Swansea, Wales
- Date of death: 19 April 2024 (aged 71)
- Place of death: Cwmrhydyceirw, Wales
- Height: 5 ft 9 in (1.75 m)
- Position: Winger

Senior career*
Years	Team	Apps	(Gls)
1970–1975	Burnley	180	(45)
1975–1977	Derby County	68	(15)
1977–1978	Queens Park Rangers	28	(4)
1978–1980	Burnley	76	(9)
1980–1983	Swansea City	88	(27)
1983–1984	Sunderland	52	(4)
1984–1985	Bury	46	(5)
1985–1986	Newport County	28	(2)
1986–1989	Burnley	79	(13)
Total		645	(124)

International career
1971–1983	Wales	54	(10)

Managerial career
- 1993–1994: Gainsborough Trinity
- 1994: Morecambe
- 1994–1995: Netherfield
- 1995–1996: Ilkeston Town
- 1997–1998: Accrington Stanley
- 1998–2000: Llanelli
- 2001–2002: Garden Village
- 2002–2003: Llanelli
- 2009–2010: Aberaman Athletic
- 2011–2012: Haverfordwest County
- * Club domestic league appearances and goals

Leighton James (16 February 1953 – 19 April 2024) was a Welsh professional footballer who played as a winger. He played almost 400 times for Burnley F.C. in three different spells at the club, being tenth on the club's most appearance list. He was widely regarded as one of Swansea City's finest ever players and his goal for Swansea against Preston North End in the final game of the season in 1981 helped Swansea get promoted to the Football League First Division for the first time in their history. In 1977, he scored a penalty for Wales in a 1–0 win against England, their only victory against England at Wembley. John Toshack described him as "one of the finest wingers that British football has ever produced and we were very very lucky at the fact he was a Welshman".

== Club career ==
James started his career as a left winger with Burnley, making his Football League debut in November 1970 against Nottingham Forest.

In 1975, he signed for Derby County for a club-record fee of £300,000, and in 1977 joined Queens Park Rangers in exchange for Don Masson. He made his debut against West Bromwich Albion in October 1977, and went on to play 33 games, scoring six goals. In 1978, he returned to play with Burnley, but left in 1980 when they were relegated to the Third Division.

Manager John Toshack signed James for Swansea City for £130,000 in 1980, in a move to build a side capable of gaining promotion to the First Division after their rapid rise up the Football League. They won the Second Division at the first attempt, with James scoring the first goal against Preston North End in the last game of the season, securing the club's promotion.

He later had spells with Sunderland, Bury and Newport County, before he returned to Burnley for a third spell in 1986 as youth-team manager and occasional player. He retired from playing in 1989 after being sacked as youth-team manager.

== International career ==
In 1971, he won his first international cap, aged 18, against Czechoslovakia at Letenský Stadion in Prague in a 1–0 defeat. His first international goal was in a 2–0 victory against Poland at Ninian Park in Cardiff in March 1973. In May 1977, he scored the only goal of the game, a penalty, in a defeat of England, in the British Home Championship at Wembley, their only win against England in England. He also captained the team, making his first appearance as captain against Iceland at Vetch Field, Swansea, in October 1981. He played 54 times for Wales, scoring ten goals.

== Managerial career ==
James became a coach at Bradford City, before succeeding Gary Simpson as manager of Gainsborough Trinity in October 1993. He was the manager at Morecambe, but was sacked after five months in charge. In October 1995, he was appointed manager of Southern League Premier Division side Ilkeston Town. After winning his first three matches in charge, the team then went twenty games without a victory, and James left the club in February 1996, to be replaced by Keith Alexander. On 29 September 1997, James took over from Tony Greenwood as manager of Accrington Stanley. He spent five months in charge at the Crown Ground, before resigning in February 1998 due to other work commitments.

James also had two spells in charge of League of Wales club Llanelli, but in his second spell, he oversaw the club's relegation in the 2002–03 season. In the 2001–02 season, he coached Garden Village of the Welsh Football League to the Second Division championship title with a final-day victory at Chepstow Town.

James worked as a football pundit for BBC radio and television, along with a regular programme on Real Radio. The BBC suspended James for a period due to controversial remarks made in a regular newspaper column regarding Cardiff City.

In December 2009, James was appointed manager of Welsh Football League Division One side Aberaman Athletic.

James was appointed Director of Football at Welsh Football League Division One side Haverfordwest County in 2011, but resigned after less than two months.

== Personal life ==
In June 2007, the BBC reported that James was given a driving ban for driving while one-and-a-half times over the legal alcohol limit.

James caused controversy in March 2008 by commenting in his column in the South Wales Evening Post that he would like Cardiff City to lose to Barnsley in the 2008 FA Cup semi-final. Although the rivalry between the football clubs of Swansea City and Cardiff City is well documented, James' comments angered some because of his supposed impartiality as a pundit, and also for his staunch attitude that Welsh people should support Welsh teams in whatever sport, an opinion he had discussed at length on radio phone-in programmes. As punishment for his comments, the BBC saw fit to ban James from appearing on their programmes for two weeks. He returned on 26 April 2008 to the Wales on Saturday programme.

James' comments about Cardiff City were the subject of the song "Leighton James Don't Like Us", recorded by Cardiff musician Leigh Bailey.

Away from football, in June 2007, James was named Rookie Lollipop Man of the Year by Swansea Council for Penyrheol Primary School, which his nephew Thomas James went to.

James was a rugby fan and often commented on rugby on the Real Radio sports phone-in. He was an avid supporter of Scarlets. He also played cricket and has been described as an extremely competent batsman.

He had a daughter, Jemma and granddaughter Annabel who are Burnley season ticket holders.

James died in Cwmrhydyceirw on 19 April 2024, at the age of 71.

== Honours ==
Burnley

- Associate Members' Cup runner-up: 1987–88
