= Walter Cox (footballer, born 1863) =

Scottish footballer

Personal information
- Full name: Walter Cox
- Date of birth: 1863
- Place of birth: Scotland
- Position: Goalkeeper

Senior career*
Years	Team	Apps	(Gls)
?–1888	Leith Harp		
1888–1890	Burnley	26	(0)
1890	Everton	4	(0)
1890	Nottingham Forest	3	(0)
- * Club domestic league appearances and goals

Walter Cox (born 1863), also credited as William Cox, was a Scottish professional association footballer who played as a goalkeeper. He played a total of 30 matches in the Football League for Burnley and Everton.

== Playing career ==
Cox started his career in his native Scotland with Leith Harp before briefly joining Leith Athletic and then Football League side Burnley midway through the 1888–89 season. He was signed to replace Robert Kay, who had just been released by the club. Cox made his Burnley debut on 10 November 1888 at Turf Moor, Burnley and he replaced Fred Poland as goalkeeper. The visitors were West Bromwich Albion. Cox played well and made some notable saves in the opening quarter-hour. Burnley took the lead after twenty minutes and only poor finishing prevented Burnley from having a larger lead at half-time. Burnley played well in the second half and got their second goal after 70 minutes. Burnley won 2–0 win and achieved their first clean sheet of the season. Cox kept his place in the team for the remainder of the season, and he kept clean sheets in wins against Notts County, Derby County and Aston Villa. Cox also played in both FA Cup ties played in February 1889. He played 13 League matches and Burnley finished 9th in the League conceding 62 goals in 22 games, the second worst defence that season. However, Cox did improve the defence. In the opening nine games, before Cox was signed, Burnley conceded 38 goals from at a rate of 4.22 goals per game. From Cox making his debut until the end of the season, they conceded 24 goals in 13 games at a rate of 1.84 goals per game. Cox remained the first choice goalkeeper into the 1889–90 season. The Burnley team suffered several heavy defeats while Cox played in goal, including a 1–7 loss away at Blackburn Rovers and a 1–9 defeat to Wolverhampton Wanderers. Cox played a total of 28 first-team matches for the club, conceding 80 goals during that time. He made his final appearance for Burnley on 4 January 1890 in the 1–4 loss to Derby County.

Upon leaving Burnley, Cox signed for Everton. He made his debut for the club on 22 February 1890 in the 3–5 defeat away at Accrington. Cox then kept goal in home wins against West Bromwich Albion and Derby County before playing his final game for the club in the final match of the season, a 1–4 loss against West Bromwich Albion. He left Everton in the summer of 1890 and moved into non-league football with Nottingham Forest.

Cox played in goal for Leith Athletic in 1891 and Heart of Midlothian later in the 1890s (winning the Scottish Football League with Hearts in 1894–95).
