= Jimmy Hill (Scottish footballer) =

Scottish footballer (born 1872)

Personal information
- Full name: James Hill
- Date of birth: 1872
- Place of birth: Paisley, Scotland
- Position: Forward

Senior career*
| Years | Team | Apps | (Gls) |
| – | St Mirren | | |
| 1889–1897 | Burnley | 151 | (37) |
| 1897–1898 | Stoke | 31 | (11) |
| 1898–1900 | New Brighton Tower | 53 | (7) |
| Total | | 235 | (55) |
- * Club domestic league appearances and goals

James Hill (1872 – after 1900) was a Scottish footballer who played in the Football League for Burnley, New Brighton Tower and Stoke.

== Career ==
Hill was born in Paisley and began his career as a teenager with hometown club St Mirren; following some impressive performances alongside James Dunlop, he was signed by English side Burnley. He became a vital member of the "Clarets" early league side occupying the left wing position for eight seasons and in total Hill made 163 appearances for Burnley, scoring 42 goals. He left for Stoke midway through the 1896–97 with Burnley on their way to relegation. He provided Stoke with decent service in two seasons he spent at the Victoria Ground, scoring 13 goals in 35 matches. He ended his career with the short lived New Brighton Tower.

== Career statistics ==
Appearances and goals by club, season and competition
| Club | Season | League | | | FA Cup | | Total | |
| Club | Season | Division | Apps | Goals | Apps | Goals | Apps | Goals |
|---|---|---|---|---|---|---|---|---|
| Burnley | 1889–90 | The Football League | 8 | 3 | 0 | 0 | 8 | 3 |
| Burnley | 1890–91 | The Football League | 16 | 4 | 2 | 1 | 18 | 5 |
| Burnley | 1891–92 | The Football League | 21 | 5 | 3 | 4 | 24 | 9 |
| Burnley | 1892–93 | First Division | 27 | 6 | 2 | 1 | 29 | 7 |
| Burnley | 1893–94 | First Division | 25 | 11 | 1 | 0 | 26 | 11 |
| Burnley | 1894–95 | First Division | 20 | 3 | 1 | 0 | 21 | 3 |
| Burnley | 1895–96 | First Division | 20 | 4 | 3 | 0 | 23 | 4 |
| Burnley | 1896–97 | First Division | 14 | 1 | 0 | 0 | 14 | 1 |
| Burnley | Total | | 151 | 37 | 12 | 6 | 163 | 43 |
| Stoke | 1896–97 | First Division | 10 | 6 | 1 | 0 | 11 | 6 |
| Stoke | 1897–98 | First Division | 21 | 5 | 3 | 2 | 24 | 7 |
| Stoke | Total | | 31 | 11 | 4 | 2 | 35 | 13 |
| New Brighton Tower | 1898–99 | Second Division | 28 | 2 | 1 | 0 | 29 | 2 |
| New Brighton Tower | 1899–1900 | Second Division | 25 | 5 | 1 | 1 | 26 | 6 |
| New Brighton Tower | Total | | 53 | 7 | 2 | 1 | 55 | 8 |
| Career total | | | 235 | 55 | 18 | 9 | 253 | 64 |
