= William McKie =

William McKie may refer to:

- William McKie (musician) (1901–1984), Australian-British organist, conductor and composer
- William McKie (wrestler) (1886–1956), British wrestler and Olympic athlete

== See also ==
- William Mackay (disambiguation)
- William McKay (disambiguation)
- William McKee (disambiguation)
