= West Neighbourhood House =

West Neighbourhood House (formerly The St. Christopher House, which remains its legal name) is a multi-service neighbourhood centre serving west downtown Toronto, Ontario, Canada since 1912. The non-profit charitable organization provides a wide range of programs to all age groups in downtown west Toronto. St. Christopher House integrates community development approaches with direct delivery of social services. The community served by St. Christopher House includes the diverse immigrant and mixed income neighbourhoods of Trinity Bellwoods, Niagara, Palmerston/Little Italy, Little Portugal, Dufferin Grove, Parkdale, Liberty-Exhibition and Roncesvalles.

== History ==
St. Christopher House was founded on June 12, 1912 by Sir James Woods (died 1941) in Kensington Market in Toronto. St. Christopher House was one of Toronto's original neighbourhood centres and was part of the "settlement house" movement that began with the creation of Toynbee Hall in London, England.

In 2013, St. Christopher House served approximately 22,000 individuals with 206 part-time and full-time staff and 1,400 volunteers. St. Christopher House was also involved in social policy development, including the Task Force for Modernizing Income Security for Working-Age Adults co-led with the Toronto City Summit Alliance (now CivicAction) as well as partnering with the Centre for Urban and Community Studies at the University of Toronto for the community research/policy project: Neighbourhood Change: Building Inclusive Communities. In May 2012, unionized employees went on strike.

== Mission and guiding principles ==
The agency describes its mission as follows:

St. Christopher House's mission is to enable less-advantaged individuals, families and groups in the community to gain greater control over their lives and within their community.

St. Christopher House will work in partnership with the community to promote personal and social change in order to achieve a safe, healthy and accepting society for all. To this end, we will work with our resources and the strengths of the community to: build bridges within and across communities; promote access to full participation in society by addressing barriers such as illiteracy, inadequate incomes, unaffordable housing, and discrimination of all types; assist people to meet individual and family needs; provide the tools and opportunities for people to control their own lives and to take on leadership in the community; and to advocate for changes in social systems that will ensure dignity, quality of life, and equal opportunities for all.

== Programs and services ==
=== For children and youth ===
After-school and day camp programs, pre-school and youth programs, health promotion and drug awareness programs, the music school, Toronto Youth Job Corps, family violence counseling and support, parenting support and advocacy programs as well as the Community Parenting Outreach Program in Parkdale.

=== For adults ===
Programs in these areas:

- Learning Programs
- Employment Programs
- Programs for Newcomers
- Computer and Internet Programs
- Drop Ins
- Violence Against Women and Children
- Alcohol and Drug Prevention Programs
- Money

=== For seniors and persons with disabilities ===
- Meals
- Alzheimer and Frail Elderly Day Programs
- Social Work
- Recreation and Education
- In-Home Services and Transportation
- Caregiver Services

The agency operates a wheelchair bus.

== Affiliations ==
St. Christopher House is part of the Toronto Neighbourhood Centres, Canadian Association of Neighbourhood Services and International Federation of Settlements.
