= Zacharias Carr =

English footballer

Personal information
- Date of birth: 15 October 1867
- Place of birth: Leyland, Lancashire, England
- Date of death: 1951 (aged 85)
- Place of death: Chorley, Lancashire
- Position: Defender

Senior career*
Years	Team	Apps	(Gls)
18xx–1890	Preston Hornets	?	(?)
1890	Burnley	1	(0)
- * Club domestic league appearances and goals

Zacharias or Zachariah Carr (15 October 1867 – 1951) was an English professional footballer who played as a defender. He played for Preston Hornets before joining Football League side Burnley in April 1890. He could not displace regular left-back Sandy Lang from the starting line-up, and subsequently played his only match for the club on 11 October 1890 in the 1–2 loss to Bolton Wanderers at Turf Moor, and left Burnley shortly afterwards.
