= William Mackay =

William Mackay or MacKay may refer to:

- William Mackay (artist) (1876–1939), American artist
- William Andrew MacKay (1929–2013), Canadian lawyer, judge and university president
- William Paton Mackay (1839–1885), Scottish doctor, Presbyterian minister and hymn writer
- William MacKay (politician) (1847–1915), physician and political figure in Nova Scotia
- William Alexander Mackay (1860–1927), Scottish doctor who co-founded Spain's oldest football club, Recreativo de Huelva
- William John MacKay, Ontario politician

== See also ==
- William McKay (disambiguation)
- William McKee (disambiguation)
- William McKie (disambiguation)
