= William McMillan (footballer, born 1872) =

Scottish footballer (1872–1929)

Personal information
- Full name: William McMillan
- Date of birth: 15 July 1872
- Place of birth: Glasgow, Scotland
- Date of death: 1929 (aged 56–57)
- Place of death: Shotts, Scotland
- Position: Half-back

Senior career*
Years	Team	Apps	(Gls)
1894–1895	Dykehead		
1895–1896	Heart of Midlothian	0	(0)
1896–1898	Southampton	31	(3)
1898–1900	Burnley	3	(0)
1900–1901	St Mirren	2	(0)
1901–1902	Kilbarchan		
1902–1904	Arthurlie		
1904	Morton	0	(0)
1904–1905	Arthurlie		
- * Club domestic league appearances and goals

William McMillan (16 July 1872 – 1929) was a Scottish professional footballer who played at half-back for Heart of Midlothian and Southampton in the 1890s.

== Football career ==
=== Early career ===
McMillan was born in Glasgow, Scotland but started his professional career in Edinburgh with Heart of Midlothian. During his time at "Hearts", the club were Scottish Football League First Division champions in 1894–95 and won the Scottish Cup in the following year. By the time the Cup Final was played, however, McMillan had moved to southern England to join Southampton of the Southern League.

=== Southampton ===
McMillan made the move south in March 1896, and made his debut for the "Saints" at the Antelope Ground on 21 March, taking the place of Ernie Taylor in a 2–0 victory over eventual champions, Millwall Athletic. McMillan retained his place at right-half for the following season and along with Robert Buchanan, George Clawley and Jack Farrell was ever-present in both the League and FA Cup. McMillan was nicknamed "Punt" for his expert kicking talent and ability to clear the ball upfield.

At the end of McMillan's first full season, Southampton, now playing at the County Ground, took the Southern League title for the first of six occasions over the next eight years. He also helped Southampton reach the second round proper of the FA Cup for the first time, where they went out to Newton Heath after a replay.

For the 1897–98 season, the Saints strengthened their side with several new signings. McMillan lost his regular place in the side to Samuel Meston who had moved forward to accommodate new signing Tom Nicol at right-back. McMillan made only seven appearances, including one at inside-left when he scored twice (against Northfleet on 11 April), before leaving the club in the summer of 1898.

=== Later career ===
He subsequently made three appearances for Burnley before returning to Scotland where he played a few matches for St Mirren and Morton before retiring.

== Honours ==
Southampton

- Southern League championship: 1896–97
