= James Woods (footballer) =

English footballer

Personal information
- Place of birth: England
- Position: Inside forward

Senior career*
Years	Team	Apps	(Gls)
1885–1889	Burnley	1	(0)
- * Club domestic league appearances and goals

James Woods was an English professional footballer who played as an inside forward. He joined Burnley in January 1885 and played in several of the club's early friendlies prior to the advent of the Football League in 1888.

== Playing career ==
James Woods made his Burnley debut on 1 December 1888 at Thorneyholme Road, Accrington and he replaced Pat Gallocher as inside-left. Burnley took on Accrington. The match was a nightmare for the Burnley defence and Burnley were 2–0 down after just five minutes. After thirty minutes matters got worse for Burnley because Ross McMahon was injured and had to leave the field so Burnley were down to ten men. Burnley got one back but Accrington made it 3–1 by half-time. The second half was one-way traffic and Accrington added two more to runout winners by 5–1. This was the only match James Woods played and the following year he left Burnley. Burnley finished 9th in the League and Burnley scored 42 goals in 22 games.
