= William McKee =

William McKee may refer to:

- William McKee (chief executive) (born 1952), chief executive of the Belfast Heath and Social Care Trust
- Sir William Cecil McKee, Lord Mayor of Belfast
- William J. McKee (1850–1929), Ontario, Canada merchant and politician
- William J. McKee (soldier) (1853–?), U.S. Brigadier-general
- William F. McKee (1906–1987), general in the U.S. Air Force
- William Parker McKee (1862–1933), chief executive of the Frances Shimer Academy, subsequently Shimer College
- William McKee (cricketer) (1919–1986), Irish cricketer

== See also ==
- William Mackay (disambiguation)
- William McKay (disambiguation)
- William McKie (disambiguation)
