= James Wood (engineer) =

James J. Wood was an engineer who contributed to the development of lockmaking, the development of the submarine, the construction of the Brooklyn Bridge, and the design of the modern refrigerator. He fabricated the steel cables for the Brooklyn Bridge, the first suspension bridge. These same cables changed the skylines of every major city by making cable-lift elevators possible. He also designed the electrics of the internal combustion engine for John Holland’s submarine and the first modern refrigerator. Some of his innovations can be found in the A/C generator, electric motors, and transformer. He held over 240 patents. He graduated from the Brooklyn Polytechnic Institute as a mechanical engineer.
