= James Wood (Lancashire cricketer) =

English cricketer

James Wood (26 June 1933 – 30 June 1977) was an English cricketer active from 1954 to 1956 who played for Lancashire. He was born in Royton, Lancashire and died in Blackpool. He appeared in one first-class match as a righthanded batsman who bowled right arm leg break. He scored no runs and held one catch. He took four wickets with a best analysis of three for 56.
