= Thomas White (footballer) =

English footballer

Personal information
- Place of birth: Uxbridge, England
- Position: Defender

Senior career*
Years	Team	Apps	(Gls)
1889–1890	Burnley	21	(0)
- * Club domestic league appearances and goals

E. Thomas White was an English professional footballer who played as a defender. Born in Uxbridge, he played 21 matches in the Football League for Burnley
