= James S. Woods =

American toxicologist and epidemiologist

James Sterrett Woods (born February 26, 1940) is an American toxicologist and epidemiologist. He is Research Professor Emeritus in the Department of Environmental and Occupational Health Sciences at the University of Washington School of Public Health.

== Education ==
Woods earned a Bachelor of Arts degree in chemistry from Princeton University in 1962. He subsequently studied at the University of Washington, where he received a Master of Science in pharmacology in 1968 and a Ph.D. in pharmacology in 1970. In 1978, he completed a Master of Public Health in epidemiology at the University of North Carolina at Chapel Hill.

== Career ==
After completing his doctorate, Woods served as an American Cancer Society Research Fellow in the Department of Pharmacology at Yale University School of Medicine from 1970 to 1972. He then joined the National Institute of Environmental Health Sciences at the National Institutes of Health, serving first as a staff fellow and later as head of the Biochemical Toxicology Section in the Laboratory of Environmental Toxicology.

In 1978, Woods joined the Environmental and Occupational Health Research Program at the Battelle Centers for Public Health Research and Evaluation in Seattle, where he worked until 2006.

== Research ==
Woods's research addressed the molecular toxicology of metals, with a focus on their effects on porphyrin metabolism, heme biosynthesis, and oxidative stress. He identified urinary porphyrin excretion patterns as biomarkers of mercury exposure in adult dental workers and characterized altered porphyrin metabolism as a biomarker of mercury exposure and toxicity more broadly.

His research group reported elevated urinary porphyrin concentrations in children with autism compared with neurotypical children of the same age and identified disordered porphyrin metabolism as a potential biological indicator for autism risk assessment.

His work contributed to the understanding of genetic polymorphisms that influence susceptibility to heavy metal neurotoxicity. He and colleagues reported that a polymorphism in the coproporphyrinogen oxidase gene (CPOX4) is associated with increased vulnerability to mercury-related neurobehavioral effects in adult dental workers and demonstrated that the same polymorphism modifies mercury's neurotoxic effects in children participating in the Casa Pia amalgam trial. The biochemical properties of the CPOX4 variant were further characterized in laboratory studies.

Woods was a lead investigator in the Casa Pia children's amalgam trial. The primary neurobehavioral results were published in the Journal of the American Medical Association in 2006. Subsequent publications examined urinary porphyrin excretion in children over the course of the trial and evaluated genetic factors modifying susceptibility to mercury exposure.

== Professional service ==
Woods served in several professional organizations, including the Society of Toxicology. He was the founding president of the Pacific Northwest Chapter (PANWAT) in 1984.

== Honors ==
Woods received the Pacific Northwest Toxicology Achievement Award from PANWAT in 2010. His research was supported by grants from the National Institutes of Health and private foundations.
