= Allison Trophy =

- Organiser(s): Edinburgh Charities Committee
- Founded: 1944; 81 years ago
- Abolished: 1963; 62 years ago
- Region: Edinburgh
- Teams: 2
- Last champions: Edinburgh Select (12th title)
- Most championships: Edinburgh Select (12 titles)

The Allison Challenge Trophy was an annual football match between an Edinburgh Select XI (a combination of Hearts and Hibs players) and a leading English Football League club.

== History ==
The Edinburgh Charities Committee invited a top English club each year to play an Edinburgh Select XI, which consisted of players from Hibernian and Heart of Midlohian, with all proceeds going to worthy causes. They alternated between Easter Road and Tynecastle Park as the match venue.

The trophy was donated by Mr William S. Allison, who was then chairman of the Edinburgh Charities Day Committee, ahead of the first meeting between Edinburgh and English opposition on 5 August 1944.

=== Hearts XI matches ===
Prior to the Edinburgh Select XI matches, Tynecastle Park hosted charity matches between Heart of Midlothian XI and invited opposition while World War II was ongoing.

A charity match between Heart of Midlothian and Arsenal was played on 2 August 1941, with the purpose of raising money for the Scottish National War Memorial.

Another match in aid of the RAF Benevolent Fund and other war charities was played between a Hearts Select XI, which featured players of other Scottish and English clubs (including Stanley Mortenson and Billy Liddell) against a Royal Air Forces XI on 7 August 1943.

=== Similar events ===
The Festival Cup was contested for by an Edinburgh Select XI against German giants Bayern Munich in 1985. Edinburgh won 3–2 in the charity match at Tynecastle Park in front of a crowd of 10,000. The Select featured players from Heart of Midlothian, Hibernian, and Meadowbank Thistle.

A testimonial match for retired Hearts legend John Cumming was played against a North East XI. The North East XI was made up of players from Dundee, Dundee United, and St Mirren (Aberdeen were unavailable). An attendance of 6,000 saw Edinburgh beaten 3–4 on 11 May 1980.

== Results ==
Season	Home team	Score	Away Team	Venue	Att	Ref
1944	Edinburgh Select XI	3–4	Aston Villa	Tynecastle	30,000	
1945	Edinburgh Select XI	4–0	Huddersfield Town	Tynecastle	30,000	
1946	Edinburgh Select XI	2–3	Aston Villa	Tynecastle		
1947	Edinburgh Select XI	4–5	Derby County	Easter Road	42,000	
1948	Edinburgh Select XI	1–1	Blackpool	Tynecastle		
1949	Edinburgh Select XI	2–3	Wolves	Easter Road	46,077	
1950	Edinburgh Select XI	1–1	Newcastle United	Tynecastle	45,000	
1951	Edinburgh Select XI	1–2	Liverpool	Easter Road	35,000	
1952	Edinburgh Select XI	3–2	Portsmouth	Tynecastle		
1953	Edinburgh Select XI	3–2	Wolves	Easter Road	39,000	
1954	Edinburgh Select XI	3–2	Bolton Wanderers	Tynecastle	45,000	
1955	Edinburgh Select XI	1–1	Newcastle United	Easter Road		
1956	Edinburgh Select XI	2–1	Birmingham City	Tynecastle		
1957	Edinburgh Select XI	1–3	Preston North End	Easter Road	40,000	
1958	Edinburgh Select XI	2–2	Liverpool	Tynecastle	28,000	
1959	Edinburgh Select XI	4–3	Newcastle United	Easter Road		
1960	Edinburgh Select XI	3–2	Chelsea	Tynecastle	34,000	
1961	Edinburgh Select XI	4–7	Burnley	Easter Road	14,000	
1962	Edinburgh Select XI	2–4	Burnley	Tynecastle		
1963	Edinburgh Select XI	7–0	Dunfermline Athletic	Easter Road		

== Total titles ==
Winners	Trophy Wins		Total
Winners	Won	Shared	Total
Edinburgh Select XI	8	4	12
Aston Villa	2	0	2
Burnley	2	0	2
Liverpool	1	1	2
Newcastle United	0	2	2
Derby County	1	0	1
Preston North End	1	0	1
Wolves	1	0	1
Blackpool	0	1	1
