= John Ashworth (footballer) =

English footballer

Personal information
- Full name: John Ashworth
- Place of birth: England
- Position: Winger

Senior career*
Years	Team	Apps	(Gls)
1888–1890	Burnley	2	(2)
- * Club domestic league appearances and goals

John Ashworth was an English professional footballer who played as a winger for Burnley in the Football League.

Ashworth joined Burnley from local club Lowerhouse in August 1888. He failed to make an appearance for the club during their first season in the League. Ashworth eventually made his debut on 14 September 1889, scoring Burnley's goal in the 1–2 defeat away at Everton. It was then almost four months before he played again for the Clarets, when he was named in the line-up for the 1–3 defeat to Stoke on 11 January 1890. Despite scoring again, Ashworth never made another appearance for Burnley and left the club at the end of the 1889–90 season.
