= Jock Espie =

Scottish footballer (1868–1911)

Personal information
- Full name: John Espie
- Date of birth: 1868
- Place of birth: Hamilton, Scotland
- Date of death: 1911 (aged 42–43)
- Position: Centre half

Senior career*
Years	Team	Apps	(Gls)
1891–1896	Burnley	93	(9)
1896	Manchester City	1	(0)
- * Club domestic league appearances and goals

John Espie (1868–1911) was a Scottish professional association footballer who played as a centre half. His sole appearance for Manchester City came in March 1896, in a draw with Burton Swifts.
