= William Brady (footballer) =

Scottish footballer

Personal information
- Date of birth: 1870
- Place of birth: Renton, West Dunbartonshire, Scotland
- Position: Forward

Senior career*
Years	Team	Apps	(Gls)
- Dundee Harp
1887	Renton		
1888–1889	Burnley	(Note: It was published previously that William (or W.) Brady played for Burnley from December 1888 and made 9 league appearances (2 goals); however, research by historians relating to contemporary accounts from Fred Spiksley established that December was the point when the better known Alec Brady (also a forward) joined Burnley with William already at the club, so some statistics attributed to Alec in that campaign would belong to William – the exact breakdown of their respective contributions is yet to be established as of November 2020. Claims in other publications that William Brady was born in 1870 and came from Renton match the verified details of Alec Brady so may be a mistake due to the other mix-up in their records. Sunderland had a forward named "W. Brady" playing for them in six friendly matches at the end of that season, possibly the same William Brady of Burnley who according to other publications played for Sunderland's neighbours Newcastle West End the following season.)	
1889	Newcastle West End		
1893	Newton Heath	1	(0)
- * Club domestic league appearances and goals

William Brady (born 1870) was a Scottish professional footballer who played as a forward.

== Playing career ==
Brady was born in Renton, West Dunbartonshire. He played for Dundee Harp. He played for Burnley in the first season of The Football League, 1888–89.

During the 1892–93 season he played for Newton Heath. William Brady is credited in two separate match reports as playing instead of Billy Hood in a match against Derby County on 11 February 1893.
