= James Woods (Canadian business executive) =

Canadian industrialist and philanthropist

Sir James Woods KBE
- Born: 1855; Woodstock, Canada West
- Died: April 25, 1941 (aged 85–86)
- Spouse: Euphemia Douglas (married June 8, 1880)
- Children: two sons, two daughters living at the time of his death

Sir James Woods KBE (1855 – April 25, 1941) was a Canadian industrialist and philanthropist who was knighted in 1915 for wartime industrial work and named knight commander of the Order of the British Empire in 1917 for his work as a member of the British War Commission in New York.

In 1928, he was vice-president of Imperial Bank of Canada.

He was president of York Knitting Mills Ltd. and of Gordon Mackay and Company Ltd., a wholesale dry goods company. Archives of Gordon Mackay are held by Trent University in Peterborough, Ontario.

In 1930, he proposed a merger of knitting mill companies including Zimmerknit and Gordon Mackay.

== Philanthropy ==
In 1912, he founded St. Christopher House, a settlement house in Toronto now known as West Neighbourhood House. Later, he was vice-chairman of the Health League of Canada.

== Activism ==
He helped establish the "Forty to Fifty Club", which was intended to help men in this age group find appropriate work.

In 1938, he published a pamphlet titled Insurance of Employment.

== Personal life ==
Woods married Euphemia Douglas on 8 June 1880. Their son, Captain John Robinson Woods, was killed in action on 24 October 1917 during the Third Battle of Ypres, also known as Passchendaele. Another son, Captain William Blakeney Woods, also served.
