= Thomas Crossley =

English footballer

Personal information
- Full name: Thomas Henry Crossley
- Place of birth: Blackburn, England
- Position: Outside forward

Senior career*
Years	Team	Apps	(Gls)
1891	Burnley	1	(0)
- * Club domestic league appearances and goals

Thomas Henry Crossley was an English professional footballer who played as an outside forward. Born in Blackburn, Lancashire, he was signed by Football League club Burnley in 1891. Crossley made his only senior appearance for Burnley on 10 February 1891 in the 0–4 defeat away at Notts County, and left the club shortly afterwards.
