= Jack Abrahams =

English footballer (1860–1922)

Personal information
- Date of birth: 26 December 1860
- Place of birth: Barrhead, Scotland
- Date of death: 1922 (aged 61–62)
- Position: Wing-half

Senior career*
| Years | Team | Apps | (Gls) |
| 1885–1889 | Burnley | 13 | (1) |
- Burnley Union Star
- * Club domestic league appearances and goals

Jack Abrahams (26 December 1860 – 1922) was a Scottish footballer who played as a wing-half.

He played 13 matches and scored one goal in the Football League for Burnley.

Abrahams joined Burnley in September 1885 (Age 24) and played in many friendly matches during the 1885–86 season, scoring his first goal for the club in the 1–2 defeat to Bolton Wanderers on 19 September. He scored thrice in total over the course of the campaign, adding to his tally with goals against Preston North End and Aston Villa. Abrahams remained an integral part of the Burnley side during the following three seasons. Jack Abrams made his League debut on 8 September 1888, playing at wing-half, at Deepdale, home of Preston North End who beat Burnley 5–2. Jack Abrams scored his debut and only League goal on 29 December 1888, playing at wing-half, at Turf Moor, home of Burnley, Abrams scoring the only goal in a 1–0 win over Notts County. Jack Abrams appeared in 13 of the 22 League games played by Burnley in season 1888–89 scoring one League goal. As a wing-half (12 appearances) he played in a Burnley midfield that achieved a big (three–League–goals–or–more) win once. As a centre-half (one appearance) he played in a Burnley defence that kept the opposition to one–League–goal–in–a–match–once.

According to one source Abrams left Burnley in 1889 (no date) and joined Burnley Union Star F.C.. How long he played for Burnley Union Star F.C. is not recorded and nothing further is known about his career.
