= Leith Harp F.C. =

Former association football club in Scotland

Leith Harp
- Full name: Leith Harp Football Club
- Nickname: the Harp
- Founded: 1880 (September)
- Dissolved: 1891
- Ground: Seafield
- Match Secretary: Francis J. Kenny
Home colours

Leith Harp Football Club was a Scottish association football club based in Leith, near Edinburgh.

== History ==
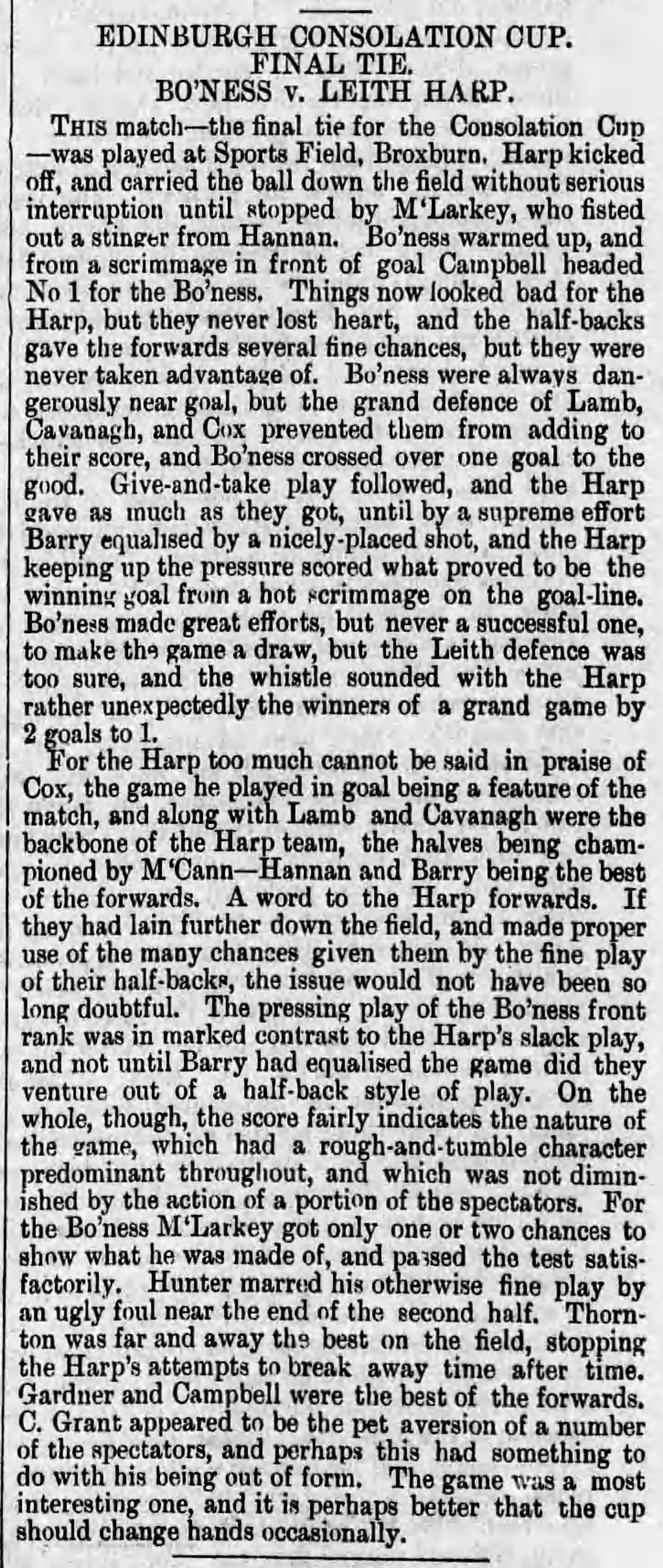
1887–88 Edinburgh Consolation Cup Final, Leith Harp 2–1 Bo'ness, Lothian Courier 14 April 1888

Leith Harp's first recorded matches were in the 1881–82 Edinburgh Shield, in which it reached the fourth round, made up of six clubs. The club played at a junior level for most of its existence, and was successful in the Leith Cup on three occasions; it is first noted as having won the competition in 1884–85, and was good enough to hold Heart of Midlothian to a draw in 1885–86.

Despite the club staying outside the Scottish Football Association, the Harp proved to be a tough side. Although it could not get past the senior sides in the Edinburgh Shield, it had success in the Consolation Cup, for clubs eliminated before the final. In 1885–86, the Harp was so strong that it beat Pumpherston 5–0 despite playing the match with ten men; the club reached the semi-final, and held the eventual winners Bo'ness to a draw. The replay went to extra-time before Bo'ness won through 4–1. The club at least had consolation by lifting the Leith Cup, goals from M'Bride, M'Parland, Boyle, and Smith seeing the club past Leith Thistle.

The Harp equalled its best run in the Edinburgh Shield was in 1887–88, by reaching the quarter-final again, losing to Hibernian, but reached the final of the Consolation Cup, where its opponents would be Bo'ness. The match was of particular importance to Bo'ness, which had won the competition twice in a row, and a third success would ensure that, under the terms of the deed of gift, the club could hold the trophy in perpetuity. However the Harp came from behind to win "rather unexpectedly" 2–1.

For the 1888–89 season, Leith Harp turned senior by joining the Scottish Football Association and entered the Scottish Cup. The club was drawn away to Erin Rovers of Bathgate, but came an unexpected cropper, losing 6–0. The Harp had turned senior too late; it lost unexpectedly to the Cameron Highlanders in the East of Scotland (formerly Edinburgh) Shield in the first round, and started to shed players during the season, with two players leaving for Darlington St Augustines, and others for Hibernian or new club Leith Athletic. Matters were so bad that for one friendly with Queensferry Hibernians, the Harp only had six men for a time. Worse was to come in the King Cup, a competition in which the Harp had never had much success, when it was hammered 9–1 at home by East Linton, a side of no pedigree, in the first round.

The club was more or less moribund after the 1888–89 season, and was struck off the Scottish FA register in August 1889. The last recorded match for the club was a 5–0 defeat at Burntisland Thistle in October 1891.

== Colours ==
The club's colours were green jerseys with blue knickers.

== Ground ==
The club played at Seafield.

== Notable players ==
- Barney Fagan, full-back, Scottish Cup winner with Hibernian in 1886–87, played for the Harp in 1885–86
- Walter Cox, goalkeeper, later of Burnley and Scottish League winner with Hearts in 1894–95, played for the Harp until 1888
- Sandy McMahon, forward, later a Celtic regular
- Willie Groves, played for the Harp until 1885

== Honours ==
- East of Scotland Consolation Cup:
  - Winners: 1887–88
- Leith Cup:
  - Winners: 1884–85, 1886–87, 1887–88
  - Runners-up: 1885–86, 1888–89
