= Hugh Galbraith (rugby union) =

Rugby union player from Northern Ireland

- Full name: Hugh Tener Galbraith
- Born: 7 October 1866 Derry, Ireland
- Died: 4 May 1941 (aged 74) Durban, South Africa
- School: Foyle College
- Occupation: Medical practitioner

Rugby union career
- Position: Forward
International career
| Years | Team | Apps | (Points) |
| 1890 | Ireland | 1 | (0) |

Hugh Tener Galbraith (7 October 1866 – 4 May 1941) was an Irish international rugby union player.

Galbraith attended Foyle College in his native Derry and completed medical studies in Scotland. While playing rugby for Albion, Galgraith gained an Ireland cap in 1890, as a forward against Wales at Lansdowne Road. He moved to South Africa and was involved in the Second Boer War as a surgeon. His medical practice was in Dundee, Natal.

== See also ==
- List of Ireland national rugby union players
