= Ross McMahon =

Scottish footballer

Personal information
- Place of birth: Scotland
- Position: Centre forward

Senior career*
Years	Team	Apps	(Gls)
1888	Erin Rovers		
1888–1889	Burnley	2	(0)
- * Club domestic league appearances and goals

Ross McMahon was a Scottish professional footballer who played as a centre forward. He played two games for Burnley in the 1888–89 season.

== 1888–1889 ==
Ross McMahon was signed by Burnley in November 1888 and on 10 November 1888 McMahon made his debut at Turf Moor, Burnley, when the visitors were West Bromwich Albion. McMahon played centre-forward in place of Bill McFettridge. Burnley defended well in both the 1st and 2nd halves and kept their first clean sheet of the season. Burnley scored a goal in each half to win 2–0. Although a happy debut for McMahaon, it was marred by his injury in the fortieth minute and Burnley having to play with ten men for most of the match. McMahon was fit enough to play three weeks after his debut. This time the venue was Thorneyholme Road, Accrington home of Accrington. Again McMahon had to go off injured before half-time but this time he team were heavily beaten 5–1 by the home side. And that was his last League game for Burnley. McMahon played in both FA Cup ties played by Burnley in February 1889 with Burnley going out in the 2nd Round to West Bromwich Albion.

Burnley finished 9th in the League in the inaugural season only scoring 42 goals in 22 games. They exited the FA Cup in the second round. Ross McMahon left Burnley at the end of the season.
