= William McColl (footballer) =

Scottish footballer

Personal information
- Full name: William McColl
- Date of birth: 19 February 1865
- Place of birth: Drymen, Stirlingshire, Scotland
- Date of death: 20 August 1903 (aged 38)
- Place of death: Larbert, Scotland
- Position: Inside forward

Senior career*
Years	Team	Apps	(Gls)
	Vale of Leven	?	(?)
	Greenock Morton	?	(?)
	Ardwick	?	(?)
	Accrington	?	(?)
1889–1890	Burnley	9	(2)
1893–1894	Vale of Leven	?	(?)
1894–1895	Renton	10	(6)

International career
1895	Scotland	1	(0)
- * Club domestic league appearances and goals

William McColl (19 February 1865 – 20 August 1903) was a Scottish professional footballer, who played as an inside forward for several English and Scottish clubs. He played one match for the Scotland national football team, in a 2–2 draw with Wales on 23 March 1895.

He was the grandfather of Ian McColl, who was also capped by Scotland and later managed the national team.
