= Robert Duckworth =

English footballer

Personal information
- Full name: Robert William Duckworth
- Date of birth: Q3 1870
- Place of birth: Burnley, England
- Date of death: 1924 (aged 53 or 54)
- Position: Inside forward

Senior career*
Years	Team	Apps	(Gls)
1887	Royal Swifts		
1888	Burnley	1	(0)
1888–1889	Nelson		
1889–1890	Burnley	4	(1)
1890	Rossendale		
1894–1895	Lincoln City	24	(5)
1895	Rossendale		
- * Club domestic league appearances and goals

Robert William Duckworth (1870–1924) was an English professional association footballer who played as an inside–forward.

Duckworth signed for Royal Swifts in 1887 and joined Burnley the following year. Robert Duckworth, playing as a forward, made his League debut on 22 September 1888 at Dudley Road, the then home of Wolverhampton Wanderers. Burnley lost to the home team 4–1. When Robert Duckworth played as a forward against Wolverhampton Wanderers on 22 September 1888 he was approximately 18 years 38 days old; which made him, on that third weekend of League football, Burnley' youngest player, replacing Alec Brady. Robert Duckworth appeared in one of the 22 League matches played by Burnley in season 1888–89.

Robert Duckworth made just five senior appearances during his time with Burnley, scoring one League goal in a 2–2 draw with Accrington in September 1889, his first appearance at Turf Moor, Burnley' home ground. His main Football League experience came in the Second Division with Lincoln City, for whom he was a regular during the Imps' 1894–95 campaign. He later rejoined Burnley but never appeared again at senior level.
