= William Graham (winger) =

English footballer

Personal information
- Full name: William Graham
- Place of birth: England
- Position: Winger

Senior career*
Years	Team	Apps	(Gls)
1891–1893	Burnley	24	(3)
1893–1894	Lincoln City	21	(2)
- * Club domestic league appearances and goals

William Graham was an English professional footballer who played as a winger.
