= William Tait (footballer) =

Scottish footballer

Personal information
- Date of birth: 1863
- Place of birth: Glasgow, Scotland
- Position: Inside forward

Senior career*
Years	Team	Apps	(Gls)
1883	Glasgow Parkside		
1884	Glasgow Pilgrims		
1885	Third Lanark		
1886–1888	Newton Heath		
1888	Burnley	5	(5)
1888–1889	Newton Heath		
1889	West Manchester		
1890–?	Ardwick		
- * Club domestic league appearances and goals

William Tait (1863 – after 1890) was a Scottish professional footballer who played as an inside forward. After playing for Glasgow Parkside, Glasgow Pilgrims and Third Lanark, he moved to England in 1887 to play for Newton Heath, the club that would later become Manchester United. The club had not yet entered league football, but Tait made 10 appearances in friendlies during the 1886–87 season, scoring two goals. He made a further 22 appearances in 1887–88, scoring 15 goals. His final appearance came on 3 March 1888 against Blackburn Olympic before a move to Burnley ahead of the inaugural season of The Football League in 1888–89. He made his debut in the opening game of the season against Preston North End on 8 September 1888; Burnley lost 5–2, and it was reported that Tait and Burnley colleague Fred Poland got into a fight with two of the Preston players. The following week, Tait scored Burnley's first goal at home to Bolton Wanderers, his first in the Football League; he then also scored Burnley's third and fourth goals in a 4–3 win, which made him the first player to score a Football League hat-trick. After the match, Tait got drunk celebrating and was suspended by the club for their next game. He returned for the next three games, scoring two goals, but then failed to turn up for the away game at Stoke on 20 October 1888 and the following week a local newspaper reported that he was "no longer a Burnley player".

Tait returned to Newton Heath, having already appeared for them in a friendly against Blackburn Rovers on 8 September, and made the first appearance of his second spell there in a Combination match at home to Leek on 20 October. His first goal came in the return fixture two weeks later, and he went on to score a total of four goals in 10 appearances before the Combination season was ended prematurely. He also played in all four matches as the team went on to win the Manchester and District Challenge Cup. He began the 1889–90 season as the team's starting outside right, but made just five appearances in the newly formed Football Alliance and one in the Lancashire Senior Cup before moving to West Manchester in November 1889. By February 1890, he had moved on to Ardwick (the club that would become Manchester City), with whom he played against Newton Heath on 1 February 1890.
