= Robert Marr =

English footballer

Personal information
- Full name: Robert Marr
- Place of birth: England
- Position: Inside forward

Senior career*
Years	Team	Apps	(Gls)
1890–1891	Burnley	9	(4)
- * Club domestic league appearances and goals

Robert Marr was an English professional footballer who played as an inside forward. He played nine games in the Football League for Burnley in the 1890–91 season, scoring four goals.

Marr signed for Burnley in November 1890 and scored on his league debut for the Clarets in the 6–1 victory over Derby County on 15 November 1890. He scored his second goal for the club on 6 December 1890 in the 5–4 win against West Bromwich Albion at Turf Moor. Marr then stayed out of the Burnley side for almost two months before returning to the line-up for the 0–4 defeat to Notts County on 10 February 1891. He then scored two goals in the following match against Preston North End. Marr made his final league appearance for Burnley on 21 March 1891 in the 0–1 away loss against Bolton Wanderers.
