= William Bury (footballer) =

English footballer

Personal information
- Full name: William Henry Bury
- Date of birth: Q3 1864
- Place of birth: Darwen, England
- Date of death: 1939 (aged 74–75)
- Position: Full back

Senior career*
Years	Team	Apps	(Gls)
1885	Padiham		
1887–1891	Burnley	43	(0)
1891	Brierfield		
- * Club domestic league appearances and goals

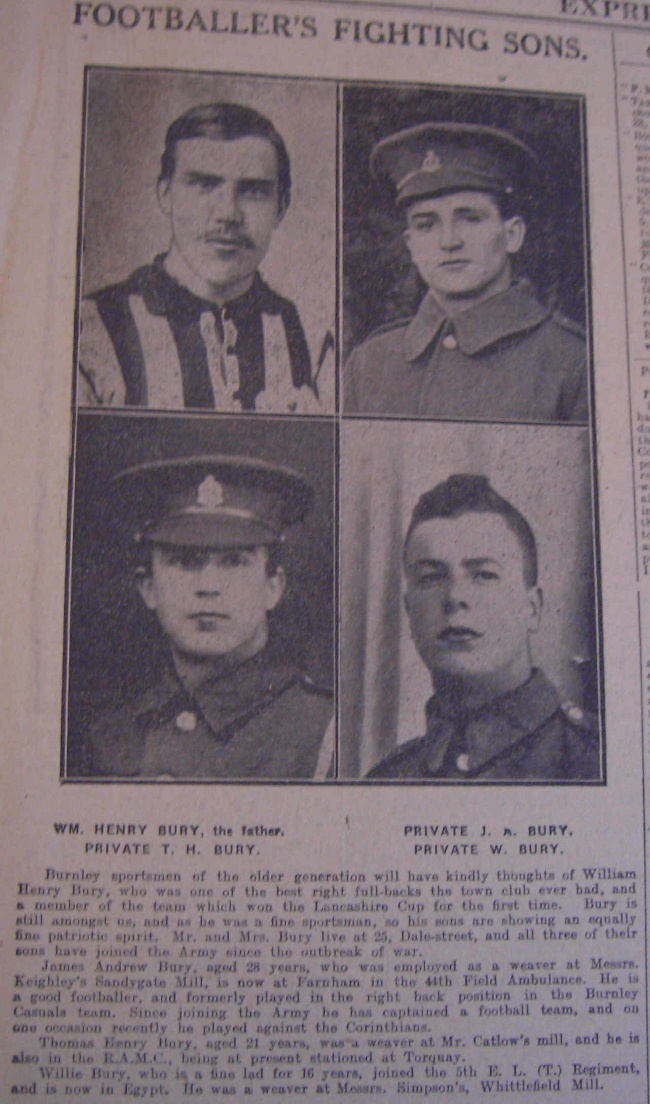
Newspaper article of William Bury and his three sons during WW1

William Henry Bury (1865–1939) was an English professional footballer who played as a full back. He was born in Darwen and played in the Football League for Burnley.

Bury came to Turf Moor from local rivals Padiham in 1887, having built up a reputation as a hard-tackling defender with a number of local clubs. He immediately established a full-back partnership with Sandy Lang, who had also arrived at Turf Moor from Padiham and the two became stalwarts in the Burnley defence. William Bury appeared in twenty of Burnley's twenty-two League games in that historic first season of League football.

== 1888-1889 ==
William Bury made his League debut on 8 September 1888, playing as a full–back, at Deepdale, the home of Preston North End. Preston North End won the match 5–2.

William Bury appeared in 20 of the 22 League games played by Burnley in season 1888–89. As a full-back (20 appearances) he played in a Burnley defence that achieved four clean sheets and restricted the opposition to one-League-goal-in-a-match on three separate occasions.
