= James Matthew =

Scottish footballer

Personal information
- Full name: James Matthew
- Place of birth: Dundee
- Position: Centre half

Senior career*
Years	Team	Apps	(Gls)
?-?	Lincoln City	?	(?)
1891–1892	Burnley	26	(1)
1892	Accrington	6	(0)
?-?	Millwall Athletic	?	(?)
- * Club domestic league appearances and goals

James Matthew was a 19th-century Scottish footballer who appeared in the Football League for Burnley and Accrington.
