= William McKay (footballer) =

Scottish footballer

Personal information
- Full name: William McKay
- Place of birth: Scotland
- Position: Inside forward

Senior career*
Years	Team	Apps	(Gls)
- Heart of Midlothian
1888–1889	Burnley	14	(7)
- Newcastle West End
- Raith Rovers
- * Club domestic league appearances and goals

William McKay, known as Willie, was a Scottish professional footballer who played as an inside forward. According to sources he commenced his career at Hearts. It is unclear when he joined Burnley, but it is reasonable to assume it was during the second half of 1888. He made his Burnley and English Football League debut on 3 November 1888. The occasion was the visit of Blackburn Rovers to Turf Moor, the home of Burnley. He scored Burnley' only goal in a heavy 7-1 defeat. He played 14 of Burnley' 22 League matches top-scoring with seven goals. He played in five of Burnley' seven victories in the 1888 - 1889 season, scoring in two of those victories. In 1889 (date unknown) Willie McKay left Burnley for Newcastle West End, who were playing in the Northern League. Newcastle West End finished 2nd in the 1889-1890 season. In 1890 (date unknown) Willie McKay left Newcastle West End FC, and England, and returned to Scotland by joining St Bernard's FC. The club had been expelled by the Scottish Football Association and travelled the country as a wanderers team. In 1891 (date unknown) Willie McKay left St. Bernard's FC and moved to Raith Rovers. A club based in Kirkcaldy, Scotland. When he left Raith Rovers and retired is unknown.
