= Alec Brady =

Scottish footballer

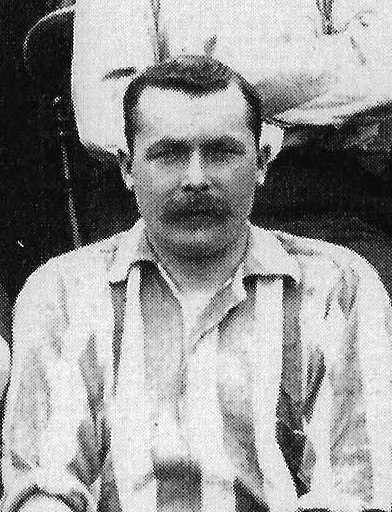

Personal information
- Full name: Alexander Brady
- Date of birth: 9 February 1870
- Place of birth: Cathcart, Renfrewshire, Scotland
- Date of death: 19 October 1913 (aged 43)
- Place of death: Renton, Dunbartonshire, Scotland
- Position: Inside forward

Senior career*
Years	Team	Apps	(Gls)
- Renton Thistle
1886–1888	Newcastle West End		
1888	Sunderland		
1888	Gainsborough Trinity		
1888–1889	Burnley (Note: It was published previously that Brady played for Burnley from September 1888 and made 20 league appearances (7 goals); however, research by historians relating to contemporary accounts from future teammate Fred Spiksley established that he played for Sunderland until mid-November then Guisborough until December, and that some appearances and goals attributed to him in that Burnley campaign would belong to William Brady who played in the same position – the exact breakdown of their respective contributions is yet to be established as of November 2020. The matter is further complicated by claims in other publications that William Brady was born in 1870 and came from Renton, which match the verified details of Alec Brady and may be a mistake. Sunderland had a forward named "W. Brady" playing for them in six friendly matches at the end of that season exactly from the point when Alec left for a second time, possibly the same William Brady of Burnley who played for Newcastle West End the following season according to other publications.)		
1889	Sunderland		
1889	Sunderland Albion		
1889–1891	Everton	34	(17)
1891–1892	Celtic	20	(4)
1892–1899	The Wednesday	158	(34)
1899–1901	Clydebank		
1901–1902	Renton		
- * Club domestic league appearances and goals

Alexander Brady (9 February 1870 – 19 October 1913) was a Scottish professional footballer who played as an inside forward. Upon his death, the Sheffield Evening Telegraph described him as being "in his day one of the best forwards in the country".

== Career ==
=== Sunderland and Burnley ===
Brady started his career with his local junior side Renton Thistle before moving to Newcastle West End. Prior to the 1888–89 season he moved to Sunderland, then on to Gainsborough Trinity F.C. for a matter of weeks before joining Burnley during the inaugural season of the English Football League in 1888–89. He returned to Sunderland when the league fixtures ended in March 1889, then turned out for neighbours Sunderland Albion from the end of April.

=== Everton ===
In August 1889 Brady had been convinced to join Everton by their captain Andrew Hannah, also from Alec's hometown of Renton. However a dispute with his player registration meant he was given a two-month suspension. After scoring twice on his debut against Stoke and a hat-trick in the 11–2 against Derby in the FA Cup (Everton's record victory), they narrowly missed out on winning the league title to Preston North End. In his second season with Everton, they were crowned English League Champions.

=== Celtic and Sheffield Wednesday ===
In the summer of 1891 he was lured back to Scotland along with Everton teammate Dan Doyle to play for Celtic in the second season of the Scottish Football League. Despite narrowly missing out on the league title to Dumbarton, they went on to win the Scottish Cup, the club's first ever major trophy.

Brady spent just one season at Celtic before returning to England with The Wednesday, where he remained for seven seasons. He was a part of the Wednesday side that won the FA Cup in 1896, making Brady one of the first players to win both the Scottish and English trophies at a time when they were considered the pinnacle of football competitions.

He returned to Scotland to play with Clydebank in 1899 before returning to his hometown team, Renton where he ended his playing career.

After retiring from football he stayed in Renton, where he lived with his family until his death in 1913, aged 43. He was buried in Millburn Church, Renton which was marked with a memorial headstone in April 2016 by The Celtic Graves Society and Everton Heritage Society.

== Honours ==
Everton

- English Football League: 1890–91

Celtic

- Scottish Cup: 1892
- Glasgow Cup: 1891
- Glasgow Merchants Charity Cup: 1892

The Wednesday

- FA Cup: 1896

== Notes and references ==
- Joyce, Michael (2004). Football League Players' Records 1888-1939 (paperback).
