= Archibald Kaye =

Scottish footballer

Personal information
- Full name: Archibald Kaye
- Date of birth: 1869
- Place of birth: Glasgow, Scotland
- Date of death: Unknown
- Position: Goalkeeper

Senior career*
Years	Team	Apps	(Gls)
	Glasgow Thistle	?	(?)
1889–1891	Burnley	28	(0)
- * Club domestic league appearances and goals

Archibald Kaye (1869 – unknown) was a Scottish professional footballer who played as a goalkeeper for Glasgow Thistle and Burnley.

Kaye saved the possibly first penalty kick in history while at Burnley. During a friendly match between Burnley and Darwen at Turf Moor on 1 September 1890, the away side were awarded a penalty kick by the referee but it was saved by Kaye, who helped his team to record a 3–2 win. (Note: In June 1890, the International Football Association Board added the penalty kick to the Laws of the Game, although penalty kicks were not officially adopted until the beginning of the 1891–92 season.)
