= Hugh Galbraith (footballer) =

Scottish footballer

Personal information
- Full name: Hugh Galbraith
- Date of birth: 22 December 1868
- Place of birth: Govan, Scotland
- Date of death: 1930 (aged 61–62)
- Position: Winger

Senior career*
Years	Team	Apps	(Gls)
1888–1889	Bootle	1	(0)
1888–1899	Accrington	1	(0)
1890–1891	Middlesbrough Ironopolis	?	(?)
1891–1892	Burnley	5	(2)
1892–1897	Luton Town	43	(33)
1897–1898	?	?	(?)
1898–1899	Luton Town	3	(0)
1899–1900	Glossop North End	0	(0)
- * Club domestic league appearances and goals

Hugh Galbraith (22 December 1868 – 1930) (another source believes Hugh Galbraith was born in Waterford, Ireland and was born on 2 December 1867) was a Scottish footballer, most notable as a player for Luton Town.

== Career ==
According to the source that states Hugh Galbraith was born in Ireland also records that he started his career in 1886 at a club called Glasgow East End F.C.

In 1887 Galbraith then moved to Dundee Our Boys. According to Wikipedia Galbraith joined a club that got to the Quarter-Finals of the Scottish Cup. Whether Galbraith played in the Scottish Cup matches in unknown.

Galbraith started his career in England with Bootle in Feb-1889. He played for Bootle in a FA Cup tie against "The Invincibles," Preston North End F.C.. Bootle lost 0-3. In February or March 1889 he signed for Accrington. On 23 March 1889 at Thorneyholme Road the home of Accrington FC he made his League and Accrington debut against Bolton Wanderers. Galbraith played as a Inside Forward and Accrington lost 2-3.

He then spent one-year spells with Middlesbrough Ironopolis and Burnley before arriving at Luton Town in 1892. After five years with the club, Galbraith left, but returned a year later for another season with Luton. He finally departed Luton for good in 1899, when he joined Glossop North End for a solitary season before retiring. |

== Statistics ==
Club	Season	Division	League		FA Cup		Total	
Club	Season	Division	Apps	Goals	Apps	Goals	Apps	Goals
Accrington	1888–89	The Football League	1	0	-	-	1	0
Burnley	1891–92	Football League	5	2	-	-	5	2
Luton Town	1898–99	Second Division	3	0	3	1	6	1
