= Daniel Spiers =

Scottish footballer

Personal information
- Full name: Daniel Spiers
- Date of birth: 1868
- Place of birth: Ayrshire, Scotland
- Position: Defender

Senior career*
Years	Team	Apps	(Gls)
- Greenock Morton
1889–1892	Burnley	27	(1)
- * Club domestic league appearances and goals

Daniel Spiers (born 1868) was a Scottish professional footballer who played as a centre half. He played in the English Football League for Burnley between 1889 and 1892, making 27 league appearances and scoring one goal.
