= Claude Lambie =

Scottish footballer

Personal information
- Date of birth: 1868
- Place of birth: Glasgow, Scotland
- Date of death: July 1921 (aged 52–53)
- Place of death: Smethwick, England
- Position: Centre forward

Senior career*
Years	Team	Apps	(Gls)
- Glasgow Thistle
1889–1891	Burnley	25	(21)
1891–1892	Clyde		
1892–1893	Burnley	4	(0)
- * Club domestic league appearances and goals

Claude Lambie (1868–1921) was a Scottish professional footballer who played as a centre forward. He had two spells in the Football League with Burnley in the late 19th century, as well as playing in the Scottish Football League with Clyde. He is notable for being the first ever Burnley player to score a hat-trick in a competitive match at Turf Moor, and actually scored the club's first four competitive hat-tricks at the ground. After retiring from football, he became a private in the British Army.

== Playing career ==
Lambie began his footballing career in his native Glasgow in the latter part of the 1880s when he joined Glasgow Thistle, who at the time played in the Scottish Football Alliance. His performances and goalscoring for Thistle attracted clubs in the English Football League. In 1889, he was signed by Burnley.

In his first season with the Clarets, Lambie played only seven times in the league, but scored five goals in this time. In the 1890–91 season he played 18 matches and scored 16 goals as the side finished eighth in the league. During this first spell at Burnley, he became the first-ever Burnley player to score a hat-trick in a competitive match at Turf Moor, in the 7–0 victory over Bolton Wanderers on 1 March 1890. He went on to score three more hat-tricks in the following season; one against Aston Villa in a 4–4 draw, and two hat-tricks against Derby County. In total he made 27 senior appearances for the Clarets, scoring on 22 occasions before he left the club in the summer of 1891.

Upon leaving Burnley, Lambie moved back north to Scotland to join Scottish Football League outfit Clyde. He helped Clyde achieve an eighth-placed finish in the 1891–1892 campaign before briefly leaving football to join the Highland Light Infantry.

He returned to Football League First Division Burnley in the 1892–93 season, but he only made four appearances in the league and did not manage to score. He left Burnley the same season and subsequently retired from football to rejoin the Army.

== Personal life ==
Lambie was born in 1868 in Glasgow, Scotland. He was in the British Army with the Highland Light Infantry during the late 1890s. He left Britain for active service in South Africa before later returning to England. In July 1921, aged 53, his body was found on a railway line near Smethwick. His death was ruled a suicide.
