= Bill McFettridge =

Scottish footballer (1864–1931)

Personal information
- Full name: William McLintock McFettridge
- Date of birth: 22 April 1864
- Place of birth: Govan, Scotland
- Date of death: 9 May 1931 (aged 67)
- Place of death: Burnley, England
- Position: Wing half

Senior career*
Years	Team	Apps	(Gls)
1879–1883	Thornliebank		
1883–1886	Padiham		
1886–1893	Burnley	85	(2)
- * Club domestic league appearances and goals

William McLintock McFettridge (22 April 1864 – 9 May 1931) was a Scottish professional footballer who played as a wing half. He played his early football for Thornliebank, a club based in the south of the city of Glasgow, Scotland and appeared as a 16 year old in the 1880 Scottish Cup Final. Thornliebank were beaten 3–0 by Queen's Park, and McFettridge played centre-half. In 1883 he moved to England to play for Padiham, then a power in Lancashire football. In 1886 he transferred to Burnley.

McFettridge soon established himself in the Burnley team and showed himself to be a versatile player with an ability to play in attack or defence. However, he soon made the right-half position his own and built a strong relationship with left-half Jack Keenan. He played with a hard, robust style proving very effective in those early days.

== 1888–1889 ==
McFettridge made his Football League debut on 15 September 1888, playing at full-back, at Pike's Lane, then home of Bolton Wanderers. Burnley defeated Bolton Wanderers 4–3. Bill McFettridge appeared in 16 of the 22 League games played by Burnley in season 1888–89. As a wing-half (11 appearances) he played in a Burnley midfield that achieved a big (three-League-goals-or-more) win once.

McFetteridge played for Burnley for five seasons in the Football League from 1888 to 1893 and made 85 appearances and scored 2 goals.
