= Fred Poland =

Scottish footballer

Personal information
- Place of birth: Dundee, Scotland
- Position: Forward

Senior career*
| Years | Team | Apps | (Gls) |
| 1885 | Dundee Our Boys | ? | (?) |
| 1886 | Burnley | | |
| 1887 | Newton Heath | | |
| 1888 | Burnley | 9 | (5) |
- * Club domestic league appearances and goals

Fred Poland was a Scottish professional footballer who played as a centre forward. He was signed by Burnley in April 1888. He had played football in Scotland for Dundee Our Boys.

== Career ==
Poland moved to Lancashire from Scotland in search of work. He let it be known around Burnley that he was a footballer, having played at senior level in Scotland, and also that he was both a goalscorer and a goalkeeper. The football club heard about him and invited him to play in a friendly match against Newton Heath at Turf Moor. He played at centre-forward, exceeding expectations by scoring two goals in a 7-1 victory. He continued to play well and score goals as the 1887–1888 season drew to a close, and was retained by Burnley for the forthcoming inaugural Football League season.

Poland made his league début on 8 September 1888, as a forward, against Preston North End at Deepdale. The home team defeated Burnley 5–2, Poland scoring his team's second. He made nine appearances, from a possible 22 league games played by Burnley in season 1888–89, and scored five league goals.
