= Jack Keenan (footballer) =

English footballer

Personal information
- Full name: John Keenan
- Date of birth: 1863
- Place of birth: Clitheroe, England
- Date of death: 16 March 1906 (aged 42)
- Position: Wing half

Senior career*
Years	Team	Apps	(Gls)
1883–1884	Clitheroe		
1884–1893	Burnley	68	(0)
- * Club domestic league appearances and goals

John Keenan (1863 – 16 March 1906) was an English professional footballer who played as a wing half. A strong, powerful half-back, Jack Keenan came to Burnley from Clitheroe, his home-town club, in 1884 and quickly established himself in a team consisting almost entirely of Scots. Keenan was a regular in his early days at Turf Moor and his consistency brought him to the fringe of international honours.

== 1888-1889 ==
Jack Keenan made his League debut on 8 September 1888, playing at wing-half, at Deepdale, home of Preston North End who defeated Burnley 5–2. Jack Keenan played in 20 of the 22 League matches played by Burnley in season 1888–89. As a wing-half he played in a Burnley midfield that achieved big (three-League-goals-or-more) wins on two separate occasions.
