= Alec Stewart (footballer, born 1868) =

Scottish footballer

Personal information
- Full name: Alexander Stewart
- Date of birth: 1868
- Place of birth: Greenock, Scotland
- Date of death: Unknown
- Position: Wing half

Senior career*
| Years | Team | Apps | (Gls) |
- Morton
| 1889–1892 | Burnley | 57 | (7) |
| 1892–1893 | Everton | 12 | (1) |
| 1893–1897 | Nottingham Forest | 99 | (0) |
| 1897–1898 | Notts County | 35 | (3) |
| | Bedminster | ? | (?) |
| | Northampton Town | ? | (?) |
| 1901–1902 | Burnley | 9 | (1) |
| 1902–1903 | Leicester Fosse | 1 | (1) |
- * Club domestic league appearances and goals

Alexander Stewart (born 1868, deceased) was a Scottish professional footballer who played as a wing half.
