= Alexander McLardy =

Scottish footballer

Personal information
- Full name: Alexander Stewart McLardy
- Date of birth: 16 August 1867
- Place of birth: Paisley, Scotland
- Date of death: 29 January 1913 (aged 45)
- Position: Inside forward

Senior career*
Years	Team	Apps	(Gls)
	Abercorn	?	(?)
1889–1892	Burnley	43	(24)
1892	Abercorn	19	(13)

International career
1893	Scottish Football League XI	1	(0)
- * Club domestic league appearances and goals

Alexander Stewart McLardy (1867 – 1913) was a Scottish professional footballer who played as a forward. He was part of the Abercorn side that won the Renfrewshire Challenge Cup and the Paisley Charity Cup in Season 1888–89, then joined Burnley in England's Football League, returning to Abercorn three years later. He was selected for the Scottish Football League XI and played in two international trials, but never gained a full cap for Scotland.
