= Sandy Lang =

Scottish footballer

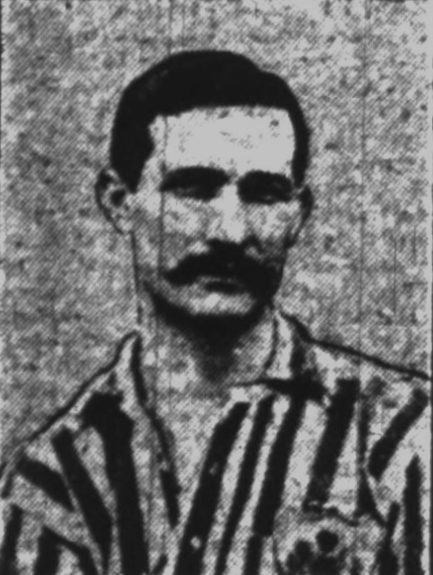

Personal information
- Full name: Alexander Lang
- Date of birth: 1864
- Place of birth: Bridge of Weir, Scotland
- Date of death: 8 November 1901 (age 36–37)
- Place of death: Burnley, England
- Position: Full back

Senior career*
Years	Team	Apps	(Gls)
1884–1885	Padiham		
1885–1895	Burnley	123	(2)
1895	Nelson		
- * Club domestic league appearances and goals

Alexander Lang (1864 – 8 November 1901) was a Scottish professional footballer who played as a full back. He came to Burnley from Padiham in 1885 and was one of the club's regular full-backs, operating on the left or right side, as well as being the club captain, when English Football League came to Turf Moor in 1888. He was born at Bridge of Weir, near Paisley, in 1864 and came south of the border to join Padiham as a 20-year-old in 1884. He brought with him a reputation as a versatile player but it was as a hard-tackling defender that he made his name. He missed only eight League games in the first seasons of League football and was the first Burnley player to complete 100 games for the club, in March 1893. The only two goals of his League career came in the previous season and the second was the club's first–ever from a penalty–kick, in a 3–2 win against West Bromwich Albion on 28 November 1891. The keeper Lang beat that day was Joe Reader, later to play for England. He played his last League game in March 1895 and became a publican in Burnley, although he later resumed his playing career, assisting Nelson to the Lancashire League Championship. He sustained fatal injuries in an accident at his home and died on 9 November 1901, aged 37.

== 1888-1889 ==
Sandy Lang made his League debut on 8 September 1888, playing at full-back, at Deepdale, the home of Preston North End. The latter defeated Burnley 5–2. Sandy Lang missed just one of the 22 League matches played by Burnley in season 1888–89. As a full-back he played in a Burnley defence that kept four clean sheets and restricted the opposition to one-League-goal-in-a-match on three separate occasions.
