= 1992–93 Notts County F.C. season =

Notts County
1992–93 season
- Chairman: Derek Pavis
- Manager: Neil Warnock (until 14 January); Mick Walker (from 14 January)
- Stadium: Meadow Lane
- First Division: 17th
- FA Cup: Third round
- League Cup: Third round
- Top goalscorer: League: Draper (11); All: Draper (12)
- Average home league attendance: 8,151
Home colours

During the 1992–93 English football season, Notts County F.C. competed in the Football League First Division.

== Season summary ==
In the 1992–93 season, Notts County's push for a return to the top flight after relegation the previous season started disappointingly and on 14 January, Warnock was sacked after four years at the club and was replaced by Mick Walker who guided the club to safety to prevent back to back relegations and hope for promotion push next time round.

== Final league table ==
Pos	Team	Pld	W	D	L	GF	GA	GD	Pts
15	Bristol City	46	14	14	18	49	67	−18	56
16	Watford	46	14	13	19	57	71	−14	55
17	Notts County	46	12	16	18	55	70	−15	52
18	Southend United	46	13	13	20	54	64	−10	52
19	Birmingham City	46	13	12	21	50	72	−22	51

Source: rsssf.com
Rules for classification: 1) Points; 2) Goals scored; 3) Goal difference

== Results ==
Notts County's score comes first

=== Legend ===
Win	Draw	Loss

=== Football League First Division ===
Date	Opponent	Venue	Result	Attendance	Scorers
16 August 1992	Birmingham City	A	0–1	10,614	
22 August 1992	Leicester City	H	1–1	10,501	D Smith (pen)
25 August 1992	Watford	H	1–2	6,276	Slawson
29 August 1992	Peterborough United	A	3–1	6,720	D Smith, Wilson, Williams
5 September 1992	Barnsley	H	1–3	6,205	Short
12 September 1992	Watford	A	3–1	7,077	Draper, Lund, Slawson
19 September 1992	Millwall	A	0–6	6,689	
26 September 1992	Luton Town	H	0–0	5,992	
29 September 1992	Tranmere Rovers	A	1–3	5,410	Murphy
3 October 1992	Bristol Rovers	A	3–3	5,015	Bartlett, D Smith, O'Riordan
10 October 1992	Grimsby Town	H	1–0	6,442	Lund
17 October 1992	Swindon Town	A	1–5	7,912	Thomas
24 October 1992	Oxford United	H	1–1	5,228	P Turner
31 October 1992	Sunderland	A	2–2	15,501	Short, Slawson
3 November 1992	Derby County	H	0–2	14,268	
7 November 1992	West Ham United	A	0–2	12,345	
14 November 1992	Wolverhampton Wanderers	H	2–2	8,494	Bartlett (2)
21 November 1992	Southend United	A	1–3	2,651	Bartlett
28 November 1992	Bristol City	A	0–1	9,086	
5 December 1992	Newcastle United	H	0–2	14,841	
12 December 1992	Cambridge United	H	1–0	5,037	R Turner
19 December 1992	Portsmouth	A	0–0	8,943	
28 December 1992	Brentford	H	1–1	6,892	Agana
9 January 1993	Millwall	H	1–2	6,148	Thomas
16 January 1993	Luton Town	A	0–0	6,729	
23 January 1993	Leicester City	A	1–1	15,716	Draper
26 January 1993	Tranmere Rovers	H	5–1	5,642	Matthews, D Smith (2, 1 pen), Agana, Draper
30 January 1993	Charlton Athletic	A	1–2	8,337	Draper
6 February 1993	Birmingham City	H	3–1	8,550	D Smith (pen), Matthews, Bartlett
21 February 1993	Peterborough United	H	1–0	7,468	D Smith (pen)
27 February 1993	Grimsby Town	A	3–3	5,871	Devlin, Draper, Lund
6 March 1993	Bristol Rovers	H	3–0	6,455	Draper (2), Devlin
9 March 1993	Wolverhampton Wanderers	A	0–3	11,482	
13 March 1993	West Ham United	H	1–0	10,272	R Walker
16 March 1993	Barnsley	A	0–0	6,372	
20 March 1993	Newcastle United	A	0–4	29,871	
23 March 1993	Southend United	H	4–0	6,109	Lund, Cox, Draper (2)
3 April 1993	Bristol City	H	0–0	6,634	
6 April 1993	Cambridge United	A	0–3	4,583	
10 April 1993	Charlton Athletic	H	2–0	6,202	Thomas, Draper
12 April 1993	Brentford	A	2–2	8,045	Devlin, R Walker
17 April 1993	Portsmouth	H	0–1	11,014	
24 April 1993	Swindon Town	H	1–1	8,382	Reeves
1 May 1993	Oxford United	A	1–1	6,171	R Walker
5 May 1993	Derby County	A	0–2	13,326	
8 May 1993	Sunderland	H	3–1	14,417	Reeves, D Smith, Draper

=== FA Cup ===
Round	Date	Opponent	Venue	Result	Attendance	Goalscorers
R3	12 January 1993	Sunderland	H	0–2	8,522	

=== League Cup ===
Round	Date	Opponent	Venue	Result	Attendance	Goalscorers
R2 First Leg	22 September 1992	Wolverhampton Wanderers	H	3–2	4,197	Lund (2), Robinson
R2 Second Leg	7 October 1992	Wolverhampton Wanderers	A	1–0	11,146	O'Riordan
R3	27 October 1992	Cambridge United	H	2–3	3,742	Draper, Agana

=== Anglo-Italian Cup ===
Round	Date	Opponent	Venue	Result	Attendance	Goalscorers
PR Group 1	2 September 1992	Derby County	A	2–4	6,767	C Short, O'Riordan
PR Group 1	15 September 1992	Barnsley	H	1–1	2,115	Palmer

== Squad ==
Note: Flags indicate national team as defined under FIFA eligibility rules; some limited exceptions apply. Players may hold more than one non-FIFA nationality.

Pos.	Nation	Player
GK	ENG	Steve Cherry
DF	ENG	Charlie Palmer
DF	JAM	Michael Johnson
DF	ENG	Chris Short
DF	ENG	Paul Cox
MF	ENG	Mark Draper
MF	ENG	Dean Thomas
MF	SCO	Paul Devlin
FW	ENG	Dave Smith
FW	ENG	Gary Lund
FW	NIR	Kevin Wilson
FW	ENG	Tony Agana
MF	ENG	Andy Williams
MF	ENG	Phil Turner
MF	IRL	Don O'Riordan
DF	ENG	Richard Walker
FW	ENG	Kevin Bartlett

Pos.	Nation	Player
DF	NED	Meindert Dijkstra
FW	ENG	Steve Slawson
FW	ENG	Dave Reeves
FW	ENG	Robbie Turner
FW	ENG	Rob Matthews
DF	ENG	Mark Smith
DF	ENG	Craig Short
GK	ENG	Bob Catlin
DF	ENG	Richard Dryden
DF	AUS	Shaun Murphy
DF	ENG	David Robinson
MF	ENG	Paul Harding
GK	ENG	Jimmy Walker
MF	ENG	Michael Simpson
DF	ENG	Dean Yates
DF	ENG	Mark Wells
