= 1991–92 Notts County F.C. season =

Notts County
1991–92 season
- Chairman: Derek Pavis
- Manager: Neil Warnock
- Stadium: Meadow Lane
- First Division: 21st (relegated)
- FA Cup: Fifth round
- League Cup: Second round
- Full Members Cup: Semi finals
- Top goalscorer: League: T. Johnson (9); All: T. Johnson (12)
- Average home league attendance: 10,987
Home colours

During the 1991–92 English football season, Notts County competed in the Football League First Division, having won promotion, via the play-offs, from the Second Division the previous season. It was Notts County's first season at this level since 1984, but ended in relegation after just one season and deprived the club of a place in the new FA Premier League.

== Season summary ==
Notts County were unable to extend their stay in the First Division beyond the single season and were relegated from English football's top flight, along with West Ham United and Luton Town; to County's credit, they managed to steer clear of the relegation zone until late in March. However, County still remained in the First Division: due to the restructuring of the Football League as a result of the formation of the FA Premier League, the Second Division was renamed the First Division.

County's first game of the season saw them take on eventual runners-up Manchester United at Old Trafford; County lost 2–0. However, in the home match against United, in January, County managed to scrape a 1–1 draw.

== Kit ==
Notts County retained their kit manufacturing deal with Matchwinner, who introduced a new home kit for the season. Nottingham-based brewers Home Bitter remained as kit sponsors, but for home games only; away from home Notts County wore kits sponsored by Edinburgh-based brewers McEwan's Lager.

== Final league table ==
Pos	Team	Pld	W	D	L	GF	GA	GD	Pts	Qualification or relegation
18	Norwich City	42	11	12	19	47	63	−16	45	Qualification for the FA Premier League
19	Coventry City	42	11	11	20	35	44	−9	44	Qualification for the FA Premier League
20	Luton Town (R)	42	10	12	20	38	71	−33	42	Relegation to the First Division (Note: From the 1992–93 season, the first tier became the Premier League, and the second tier, then known as the Second Division, was renamed to the First Division.)
21	Notts County (R)	42	10	10	22	40	62	−22	40	Relegation to the First Division
22	West Ham United (R)	42	9	11	22	37	59	−22	38	Relegation to the First Division

Source: World Football
Rules for classification: 1) Points; 2) Goal difference; 3) Goals scored
(R) Relegated

== Results ==
Notts County's score comes first

=== Legend ===
Win	Draw	Loss

=== Football League First Division ===
Date	Opponent	Venue	Result	Attendance	Scorers
17 August 1991	Manchester United	A	0–2	46,278	
20 August 1991	Southampton	H	1–0	9,613	Yates
24 August 1991	Nottingham Forest	H	0–4	21,044	
28 August 1991	Chelsea	A	2–2	15,847	T. Johnson, Bartlett
31 August 1991	West Ham United	A	2–0	20,093	Bartlett (2)
3 September 1991	Sheffield Wednesday	H	2–1	12,297	T. Johnson (2, 1 pen)
7 September 1991	Liverpool	H	1–2	16,051	T. Johnson
14 September 1991	Coventry City	A	0–1	10,685	
17 September 1991	Sheffield United	A	3–1	19,375	Bartlett (2), Rideout
21 September 1991	Norwich City	H	2–2	9,488	Rideout, Bowen (own goal)
28 September 1991	Luton Town	A	1–1	7,629	T. Johnson (pen)
6 October 1991	Manchester City	H	1–3	11,878	Thomas
19 October 1991	Leeds United	H	2–4	12,964	Lund, T. Johnson
26 October 1991	Arsenal	A	0–2	30,011	
2 November 1991	Oldham Athletic	H	2–0	7,634	Rideout, T. Johnson
16 November 1991	Aston Villa	A	0–1	23,020	
23 November 1991	Everton	A	0–1	24,230	
30 November 1991	Queens Park Rangers	H	0–1	7,901	
7 December 1991	Tottenham Hotspur	A	1–2	23,364	Craig Short
20 December 1991	Southampton	A	1–1	11,054	Slawson
26 December 1991	Chelsea	H	2–0	11,933	Yates, T. Johnson
28 December 1991	West Ham United	H	3–0	11,163	Turner, Harding, Agana
1 January 1992	Crystal Palace	A	0–1	14,202	
11 January 1992	Nottingham Forest	A	1–1	30,168	Dryden
18 January 1992	Manchester United	H	1–1	21,055	T. Johnson (pen)
1 February 1992	Leeds United	A	0–3	27,224	
8 February 1992	Arsenal	H	0–1	11,221	
22 February 1992	Queens Park Rangers	A	1–1	8,300	Bartlett
25 February 1992	Wimbledon	H	1–1	6,198	Craig Short
7 March 1992	Wimbledon	A	0–2	4,196	
10 March 1992	Aston Villa	H	0–0	8,389	
14 March 1992	Oldham Athletic	A	3–4	12,125	Draper, Williams, Lund
17 March 1992	Everton	H	0–0	7,480	
21 March 1992	Sheffield Wednesday	A	0–1	23,910	
28 March 1992	Crystal Palace	H	2–3	7,674	Craig Short, Wilson
31 March 1992	Liverpool	A	0–4	25,457	
7 April 1992	Tottenham Hotspur	H	0–2	9,205	
11 April 1992	Coventry City	H	1–0	6,665	Sansom (own goal)
18 April 1992	Norwich City	A	1–0	12,100	Matthews
20 April 1992	Sheffield United	H	1–3	12,605	Bartlett
25 April 1992	Manchester City	A	0–2	23,426	
2 May 1992	Luton Town	H	2–1	11,380	Matthews (2)

=== FA Cup ===
Round	Date	Opponent	Venue	Result	Attendance	Goalscorers
R3	5 January 1992	Wigan Athletic	H	2–0	5,913	Johnson, Turner
R4	4 February 1992	Blackburn Rovers	H	2–1	12,173	Lund, Draper
R5	15 February 1992	Norwich City	A	0–3	14,511	

=== League Cup ===
Round	Date	Opponent	Venue	Result	Attendance	Goalscorers
R2 1st leg	24 September 1991	Port Vale	A	1–2	4,722	Johnson
R2 2nd leg	9 October 1991	Port Vale	H	3–2 (lost on away goals)	4,419	Bartlett (2), Johnson (pen)

=== Full Members Cup ===
Round	Date	Opponent	Venue	Result	Attendance	Goalscorers
NR2	22 October 1991	Sheffield United	A	3–3 (won 2–1 on pens)	3,291	Draper, Bartlett, Slawson
NQF	26 November 1991	Sheffield Wednesday	H	1–0	4,118	Harding
NSF	8 January 1992	Leicester City	H	1–2	11,559	Short

== Squad ==
Note: Flags indicate national team as defined under FIFA eligibility rules; some limited exceptions apply. Players may hold more than one non-FIFA nationality.

Pos.	Nation	Player
GK	ENG	Kevin Blackwell
GK	ENG	Steve Cherry
GK	ENG	Jimmy Walker
DF	ENG	Steve Blatherwick
DF	ENG	John Brough
DF	ENG	Paul Cox
DF	ENG	Richard Dryden
DF	JAM	Michael Johnson
DF	NIR	John McClelland (on loan from Leeds United)
DF	ENG	Charlie Palmer
DF	ENG	Alan Paris
DF	ENG	Chris Short
DF	ENG	Craig Short
DF	ENG	Phil Turner
DF	ENG	Richard Walker
DF	ENG	Dean Yates
MF	SCO	Paul Devlin
MF	ENG	Mark Draper

Pos.	Nation	Player
MF	ENG	Paul Harding
MF	IRL	Don O'Riordan
MF	ENG	Phil Robinson
MF	ENG	Dean Thomas
MF	ENG	Mark Wells
MF	ENG	Andy Williams
FW	ENG	Tony Agana
FW	ENG	Kevin Bartlett
FW	ENG	Gary Chapman
FW	AUS	Frank Farina (on loan from Bari)
FW	ENG	Tommy Johnson
FW	ENG	Gary Lund
FW	ENG	Rob Matthews
FW	ENG	Dave Regis
FW	ENG	Paul Rideout
FW	ENG	Steve Slawson
FW	NIR	Kevin Wilson

== Transfers ==
=== In ===
Date	Pos	Name	From	Fee
9 August 1991	DF	Richard Dryden	Exeter City	£250,000
16 September 1991	FW	Paul Rideout	Southampton	£250,000
12 November 1991	FW	Tony Agana	Sheffield United	£750,000
4 February 1992	MF	Andy Williams	Port Vale	£115,000
22 February 1992	MF	Paul Devlin	Stafford Rangers	£40,000
26 March 1992	FW	Rob Matthews	Loughborough University	Free transfer
27 March 1992	FW	Kevin Wilson	Chelsea	£225,000
1 May 1992	FW	Gavin Worboys	Doncaster Rovers	£100,000

=== Out ===
Date	Pos	Name	To	Fee
19 July 1991	DF	Nick Platnauer	Leicester City	Free transfer
16 August 1991	MF	Dave Norton	Hull City	£80,000
7 November 1991	FW	Dave Regis	Plymouth Argyle	£200,000
10 January 1992	FW	Paul Rideout	Rangers	£500,000
12 March 1992	FW	Tommy Johnson	Derby County	£1,300,000

Transfers in: ▼£1,730,000
Transfers out: ▲£2,080,000
Total spending: ▲£350,000
