= 1993–94 Notts County F.C. season =

Notts County
1993–94 season
- Chairman: Derek Pavis
- Manager: Mick Walker
- Stadium: Meadow Lane
- First Division: 7th
- FA Cup: Fourth round
- League Cup: Second round
- Top goalscorer: League: McSwegan (15); All: Lund (19)
- Average home league attendance: 8,314

During the 1993–94 English football season, Notts County F.C. competed in Division One. They finished seventh in the league this season, just missing out on a place in the playoffs and the chance of Premier League football, and were runners-up in the Anglo-Italian Cup.

== Season summary ==
In the 1993–94 season, Notts County narrowly missed the play-offs for promotion to the Premiership. The season is most remembered for a 2–1 victory over arch rivals Nottingham Forest in which Charlie Palmer scored the winning goal with just four minutes remaining. This has become a celebrated event among Notts County fans, who have dubbed 12 February (the anniversary of the game) Sir Charlie Palmer Day. In March 1994, the Magpies lost the Anglo-Italian Cup final to Brescia.

== Final league table ==
Pos	Team	Pld	W	D	L	GF	GA	GD	Pts	Qualification or relegation
5	Tranmere Rovers	46	21	9	16	69	53	+16	72	Qualification for the First Division play-offs
6	Derby County	46	20	11	15	73	68	+5	71	Qualification for the First Division play-offs
7	Notts County	46	20	8	18	65	69	−4	68	
8	Wolverhampton Wanderers	46	17	17	12	60	47	+13	68	
9	Middlesbrough	46	18	13	15	66	54	+12	67	

Source: rsssf.com
Rules for classification: 1) Points; 2) Goals scored; 3) Goal difference

== Results ==
Notts County's score comes first

=== Legend ===
Win	Draw	Loss

=== Football League First Division ===
Date	Opponent	Venue	Result	Attendance	Scorers
14 August 1993	Middlesbrough	H	2–3	9,392	Draper (pen), Lund
21 August 1993	Peterborough United	A	1–1	6,890	Draper
28 August 1993	Sunderland	H	1–0	9,166	Lund
4 September 1993	Tranmere Rovers	A	1–3	6,317	Simpson
11 September 1993	West Bromwich Albion	H	1–0	9,870	Draper
18 September 1993	Watford	A	1–3	6,959	Draper
25 September 1993	Derby County	H	4–1	11,000	McSwegan (3), Turner
2 October 1993	Leicester City	A	2–3	16,319	Draper (pen), McSwegan
9 October 1993	Bristol City	H	2–0	6,418	McSwegan (pen), Draper
16 October 1993	Luton Town	A	0–1	6,366	
20 October 1993	Millwall	A	0–2	5,887	
23 October 1993	Portsmouth	H	1–1	6,683	Walker
30 October 1993	Nottingham Forest	A	0–1	26,721	
2 November 1993	Wolverhampton Wanderers	A	0–3	15,989	
6 November 1993	Crystal Palace	H	3–2	6,904	McSwegan (2, 1 pen), Lund
13 November 1993	Charlton Athletic	A	1–5	7,226	Agana
20 November 1993	Stoke City	H	2–0	9,815	Robinson, Turner
28 November 1993	Oxford United	H	2–1	5,302	Devlin, Agana
5 December 1993	Crystal Palace	A	2–1	13,704	Devlin (2)
11 December 1993	Millwall	H	1–3	6,516	Lund
18 December 1993	Middlesbrough	A	0–3	7,869	
27 December 1993	Grimsby Town	A	2–2	7,781	Lund, Devlin
1 January 1994	Bolton Wanderers	A	2–4	11,041	Turner, Lund
3 January 1994	Southend United	H	2–1	6,503	Draper, Dijkstra
11 January 1994	Birmingham City	H	2–1	7,212	Devlin, McSwegan
15 January 1994	Luton Town	H	1–2	6,589	Agana
22 January 1994	Bristol City	A	2–0	7,458	Legg, Agana
5 February 1994	Portsmouth	A	0–0	9,359	
12 February 1994	Nottingham Forest	H	2–1	17,911	McSwegan, Palmer
19 February 1994	Birmingham City	A	3–2	12,913	McSwegan, Wilson, Legg
22 February 1994	Peterborough United	H	2–1	6,106	McSwegan (2)
1 March 1994	Barnsley	H	3–1	6,297	Draper (2), Lund
5 March 1994	Sunderland	A	0–2	16,269	
12 March 1994	Watford	H	1–0	6,379	Lund
16 March 1994	West Bromwich Albion	A	0–3	14,594	
26 March 1994	Leicester City	H	4–1	11,907	McSwegan, Matthews, Lund (2)
30 March 1994	Southend United	A	0–1	3,758	
2 April 1994	Grimsby Town	H	2–1	7,205	Matthews, Draper
4 April 1994	Barnsley	A	3–0	6,827	Devlin, Lund, McSwegan
9 April 1994	Bolton Wanderers	H	2–1	7,270	Murphy, Devlin
12 April 1994	Tranmere Rovers	H	0–0	6,318	
16 April 1994	Wolverhampton Wanderers	H	0–2	13,438	
20 April 1994	Derby County	A	1–1	18,602	Draper
23 April 1994	Stoke City	A	0–0	16,453	
30 April 1994	Charlton Athletic	H	3–3	7,019	Draper (pen), Lund, McSwegan
8 May 1994	Oxford United	A	1–2	8,487	Draper

=== FA Cup ===
Round	Date	Opponent	Venue	Result	Attendance	Goalscorers
R3	8 January 1994	Sutton United	H	3–2	6,805	Draper, Agana, Devlin
R4	29 January 1994	West Ham United	H	1–1	14,952	Lund
R4R	9 February 1994	West Ham United	A	0–1	23,273	

=== League Cup ===
Round	Date	Opponent	Venue	Result	Attendance	Goalscorers
R1 1st leg	17 August 1993	Hull City	H	2–0	3,003	Lund, Cox
R1 2nd leg	24 August 1993	Hull City	A	1–3 (won on away goals)	2,222	Draper
R2 1st leg	22 September 1993	Newcastle United	A	1–3	25,887	Srníček (own goal)
R2 2nd leg	5 October 1993	Newcastle United	H	1–7 (lost 2–10 on agg)	6,068	McSwegan

=== Anglo-Italian Cup ===
Round	Date	Opponent	Venue	Result	Attendance	Goalscorers
Group 2	31 August 1993	Derby County	H	3–2	3,276	Legg (2), Lund
Group 2	15 September 1993	Nottingham Forest	A	1–1	7,347	Lund
R1	12 October 1993	Ascoli	H	4–2	3,756	Legg, Lund (2), Draper
R1	9 November 1993	Pisa Sporting Club	H	3–2	3,253	Agana, Devlin, Lund
R1	16 November 1993	Brescia	A	1–3	2,000	Draper
R1	22 December 1993	Ancona Calcio	A	1–0	1,000	McSwegan
SF 1st leg	26 January 1994	Southend United	A	0–1	3,706	
SF 2nd leg	16 February 1994	Southend United	H	1–0 (won 4–3 on pens)	5,485	Devlin
F	20 March 1994	Brescia	N	0–1	17,185	

== Squad ==
Note: Flags indicate national team as defined under FIFA eligibility rules; some limited exceptions apply. Players may hold more than one non-FIFA nationality.

No.	Pos.	Nation	Player
-	GK	(England) ENG	Steve Cherry
-	DF	(England) ENG	Charlie Palmer
-	DF	(England) ENG	Richard Walker
-	DF	(England) ENG	Paul Cox
-	DF	(England) ENG	Michael Johnson
-	MF	(England) ENG	Mark Draper
-	MF	(Scotland) SCO	Paul Devlin
-	FW	(England) ENG	Gary Lund
-	FW	(Scotland) SCO	Gary McSwegan
-	MF	(England) ENG	Phil Turner
-	DF	(Northern Ireland) NIR	Kevin Wilson
-	MF	(Wales) WAL	Andy Legg
-	DF	(Netherlands) NED	Meindert Dijkstra
-	GK	(England) ENG	Bob Catlin
-	FW	(England) ENG	Tony Agana

No.	Pos.	Nation	Player
-	DF	(England) ENG	Tommy Gallagher
-	DF	(Australia) AUS	Shaun Murphy
-	DF	(England) ENG	Colin Foster (on loan from West Ham United)
-	FW	(England) ENG	Rob Matthews
-	DF	(England) ENG	Paul Sherlock
-	DF	(England) ENG	Phil King
-	MF	(England) ENG	Dean Thomas
-	MF	(England) ENG	Michael Simpson
-	DF	(England) ENG	Chris Short
-	MF	(England) ENG	Peter Reid
-	FW	(England) ENG	Steve Slawson
-	DF	(England) ENG	Jim Gannon (on loan from Stockport County)
-	FW	(Bermuda) BER	Shaun Goater (on loan from Rotherham Utd)
-	DF	(England) ENG	Dean Yates

=== Left the club during season ===
Note: Flags indicate national team as defined under FIFA eligibility rules; some limited exceptions apply. Players may hold more than one non-FIFA nationality.

No.	Pos.	Nation	Player
-	FW	(England) ENG	Dave Reeves (to Carlisle United)
-	MF	(England) ENG	Andy Williams (to Rotherham United)

No.	Pos.	Nation	Player
-	DF	(England) ENG	David Robinson (Retired)
