= 1994–95 Notts County F.C. season =

Notts County
1994–95 season
- Chairman: Derek Pavis
- Manager: Mick Walker (until 14 September); Russell Slade (from 14 September – 12 January); Howard Kendall (from 12 January – 1 April); Wayne Jones/Steve Nicol (temporary from 1 April)
- Stadium: Meadow Lane
- First Division: 24th (relegated)
- FA Cup: Third round
- League Cup: Fourth round
- Anglo-Italian Cup: Winners
- Top goalscorer: League: Devlin (9); All: Devlin (12)
- Average home league attendance: 7,195

During the 1994–95 English football season, Notts County F.C. competed in the Football League First Division.

== Season summary ==
In the early stages of the 1994–95 season, Walker was surprisingly sacked in September and this triggered a dramatic decline in the club's fortunes throughout the league campaign. Even though Notts County won the Anglo-Italian Cup at Wembley in March 1995, they ended the season relegated to Division Two.

== Final league table ==
Pos	Team	Pld	W	D	L	GF	GA	GD	Pts	Qualification or relegation
20	Sunderland	46	12	18	16	41	45	−4	54	
21	Swindon Town (R)	46	12	12	22	54	73	−19	48	Relegation to the Second Division
22	Burnley (R)	46	11	13	22	49	74	−25	46	Relegation to the Second Division
23	Bristol City (R)	46	11	12	23	42	63	−21	45	Relegation to the Second Division
24	Notts County (R)	46	9	13	24	45	66	−21	40	Relegation to the Second Division

Rules for classification: 1) Points; 2) Goals scored; 3) Goal difference
(R) Relegated

== Results ==
Notts County's score comes first

=== Legend ===
Win	Draw	Loss

=== Football League First Division ===
Date	Opponent	Venue	Result	Attendance	Scorers
13 August 1994	Portsmouth	A	1–2	10,487	Sherlock
21 August 1994	Wolverhampton Wanderers	H	1–1	8,569	Simpson
27 August 1994	Sheffield United	A	3–1	9,781	McSwegan (2), Lund
30 August 1994	Oldham Athletic	H	1–3	6,604	McSwegan
3 September 1994	Swindon Town	H	0–1	6,537	
10 September 1994	Bristol City	A	1–2	6,670	Jemson
13 September 1994	Barnsley	A	1–1	3,928	Lund
17 September 1994	Stoke City	H	0–2	8,282	
24 September 1994	Charlton Athletic	H	3–3	5,726	Agana, Lund, Sturgess (own goal)
1 October 1994	Reading	A	0–2	7,465	
8 October 1994	Port Vale	H	2–2	6,903	Williams, Agana
15 October 1994	Watford	A	1–3	7,008	Williams
23 October 1994	Derby County	H	0–0	6,390	
29 October 1994	Burnley	A	1–2	12,876	Davis (own goal)
1 November 1994	Southend United	A	0–1	4,302	
5 November 1994	Sunderland	H	3–2	8,890	Devlin (2), Legg
19 November 1994	Bolton Wanderers	A	0–2	11,698	
26 November 1994	West Bromwich Albion	H	2–0	10,088	Turner, Lund
3 December 1994	Derby County	A	0–0	14,278	
6 December 1994	Tranmere Rovers	H	1–0	4,703	Devlin
10 December 1994	Wolverhampton Wanderers	A	0–1	25,786	
17 December 1994	Portsmouth	H	0–1	6,383	
26 December 1994	Millwall	H	0–1	6,758	
28 December 1994	Middlesbrough	A	1–2	21,558	McSwegan
31 December 1994	Luton Town	H	0–1	6,249	
14 January 1995	Burnley	H	3–0	8,698	White, Devlin, McSwegan
21 January 1995	Sunderland	A	2–1	14,334	Matthews, Lund
28 January 1995	Grimsby Town	A	1–2	5,161	White
4 February 1995	Tranmere Rovers	A	2–3	6,105	Legg, Devlin (pen)
7 February 1995	Bolton Wanderers	H	1–1	7,374	Matthews
11 February 1995	Southend United	H	2–2	6,768	Legg, Matthews
18 February 1995	West Bromwich Albion	A	2–3	13,748	Devlin (2)
25 February 1995	Reading	H	1–0	7,184	Agana
4 March 1995	Charlton Athletic	A	0–1	13,863	
11 March 1995	Sheffield United	H	2–1	11,102	White, Simpson
14 March 1995	Oldham Athletic	A	1–1	5,465	Devlin
21 March 1995	Bristol City	H	1–1	5,692	White
25 March 1995	Stoke City	A	1–2	10,170	White
1 April 1995	Barnsley	H	1–3	6,834	Devlin
8 April 1995	Luton Town	A	0–2	6,428	
15 April 1995	Middlesbrough	H	1–1	9,377	White
19 April 1995	Millwall	A	0–0	5,471	
22 April 1995	Grimsby Town	H	0–2	5,286	
29 April 1995	Watford	H	1–0	5,083	White
3 May 1995	Swindon Town	A	0–3	8,262	
7 May 1995	Port Vale	A	1–1	9,452	McSwegan

=== FA Cup ===
Round	Date	Opponent	Venue	Result	Attendance	Goalscorers
R3	8 January 1995	Manchester City	H	2–2	12,376	Matthews 24', White 29'
R3R	18 January 1995	Manchester City	A	2–5	14,261	McSwegan 10', Matthews 61'

=== League Cup ===
Round	Date	Opponent	Venue	Result	Attendance	Goalscorers
R2 First Leg	20 September 1994	Bristol City	A	1–0	2,546	Devlin
R2 Second Leg	27 September 1994	Bristol City	H	3–0 (won 4–0 on agg)	2,721	Jemson, Lund (2)
R3	26 October 1994	Tottenham Hotspur	H	3–0	16,952	Agana, McSwegan (2)
R4	30 November 1994	Norwich City	A	0–1	14,030	

=== Anglo-Italian Cup ===
Round	Date	Opponent	Venue	Result	Attendance	Goalscorers
Group A	24 August 1994	Ascoli	A	1–1	1,300	Devlin
Group A	6 September 1994	Lecce	H	1–0	2,495	Turner
Group A	5 October 1994	Atalanta	A	1–1	2,300	Agana
Group A	15 November 1994	Venezia	H	3–3	2,861	Devlin, Marsden, Murphy
SF First Leg	24 January 1995	Stoke City	H	0–0	5,135	
SF Second Leg	31 January 1995	Stoke City	A	0–0 (won 3–2 on pens)	10,741	
F	19 March 1995	Ascoli	N	2–1	11,704	Agana, White

== Squad ==
Note: Flags indicate national team as defined under FIFA eligibility rules; some limited exceptions apply. Players may hold more than one non-FIFA nationality.

No.	Pos.	Nation	Player
—	GK	(England) ENG	Steve Cherry
—	GK	(England) ENG	Paul Reece
—	GK	(Australia) AUS	Jason Kearton (on loan from Everton)
—	DF	(Australia) AUS	Shaun Murphy
—	DF	(Jamaica) JAM	Michael Johnson
—	DF	(England) ENG	Dean Yates
—	DF	(Scotland) SCO	Steve Nicol
—	DF	(Scotland) SCO	Graeme Hogg
—	DF	(England) ENG	Chris Short
—	DF	(England) ENG	Tommy Gallagher
—	DF	(Nigeria) NGA	Michael Emenalo
—	DF	(England) ENG	Michael Forsyth
—	DF	(England) ENG	Richard Walker
—	DF	(England) ENG	Ray Daniel (on loan from Portsmouth)
—	DF	(England) ENG	Paul Sherlock
—	DF	(England) ENG	Colin Hoyle
—	DF	(England) ENG	Paul Cox
—	MF	(Scotland) SCO	Paul Devlin
—	MF	(England) ENG	Phil Turner

No.	Pos.	Nation	Player
—	MF	(England) ENG	Gary Mills
—	MF	(Wales) WAL	Andy Legg
—	MF	(England) ENG	Peter Butler
—	MF	(England) ENG	Michael Simpson
—	MF	(England) ENG	Chris Marsden
—	MF	(England) ENG	Mick Galloway
—	MF	(England) ENG	Martin Kuhl (on loan from Derby County)
—	MF	(England) ENG	Ian Ridgway
—	MF	(England) ENG	James Hunt
—	FW	(England) ENG	Tony Agana
—	FW	(England) ENG	Gary Lund
—	FW	(Scotland) SCO	Gary McSwegan
—	FW	(England) ENG	Devon White
—	FW	(England) ENG	Rob Matthews
—	FW	(England) ENG	Kevin Russell
—	FW	(England) ENG	Nigel Jemson
—	FW	(England) ENG	John Williams (on loan from Coventry City)
—	FW	(England) ENG	Steve Slawson
