= Steve Cherry =

English footballer

Personal information
- Full name: Steve Reginald Cherry
- Date of birth: 5 August 1960 (age 66)
- Place of birth: Nottingham, England
- Height: 5 ft 11 in (1.80 m)
- Position: Goalkeeper

Youth career
- 1976–1978: Derby County

Senior career*
Years	Team	Apps	(Gls)
1978–1984	Derby County	77	(0)
1980–1981	→ Port Vale (loan)	4	(0)
1984–1986	Walsall	71	(0)
1986–1989	Plymouth Argyle	73	(0)
1989	→ Chesterfield (loan)	10	(0)
1988–1995	Notts County	266	(0)
1995–1996	Watford	4	(0)
1996	→ Plymouth Argyle (loan)	16	(0)
1996–1997	Rotherham United	20	(0)
1997	Kettering Town		
1997–1998	Rushden & Diamonds	18	(0)
1998	Rothwell Corinthians		
1998	Gainsborough Trinity		
1998	Stalybridge Celtic	10	(0)
1998	Mansfield Town	1	(0)
1999	Oldham Athletic	0	(0)
2003	Lincoln City	0	(0)
2003–2004	Kidsgrove Athletic		
2004	Belper Town		
Total		570	(0)

International career
1978	England Youth	2	(0)
- * Club domestic league appearances and goals

Steve Reginald Cherry (born 5 August 1960) is an English former professional footballer who played as a goalkeeper. He made over 690 league and cup appearances in a 20-year career in the Football League and Conference, playing in the top five divisions of the English game.

Cherry was spotted playing for Calverton Youth Wing by Derby County and joined the club on a two-year apprenticeship in 1976, becoming professional two years later. He won three caps for the England Youth Team in 1978. He started his first competitive senior game in February 1980 and played eight games on loan at Port Vale during the 1980–81 season. He established himself in the first team at Derby during the 1982–83 season and was voted the club's Player of the Year in May 1983. The club were relegated out of the Second Division at the end of the 1983–84 season. He was transferred to Walsall in August 1984. He was voted as Walsall's Player of the Season at the end of the 1984–85 campaign but lost his first-team place at the end of the following campaign and was sold to Plymouth Argyle for a £19,000 fee in November 1986. After a poor start to his Plymouth career, he improved and was named the club's Player of the Year in 1988. He then asked for a transfer and joined Chesterfield on loan during the 1988–89 season before being sold to Notts County for a £70,000 fee in February 1989.

Cherry was Neil Warnock's first signing as Notts County manager, and the club found instant success under Warnock's stewardship, winning promotions from the Third Division to the First Division via the play-offs in 1990 and 1991. Though County were relegated back to the second tier, he was named the club's Player of the Year in 1992. He played in two Anglo-Italian Cup finals, as County finished as runners-up in 1994 and champions in 1995. He moved on to Watford in July 1995 before rejoining Plymouth Argyle on loan in February 1996. He helped Plymouth to win the Third Division play-offs in 1996, his third such success with Neil Warnock and fifth appearance at Wembley. He then saw out his career with brief stays at Rotherham United, Kettering Town, Rushden & Diamonds, Rothwell Corinthians, Gainsborough Trinity, Stalybridge Celtic, Mansfield Town, Oldham Athletic, Lincoln City, Kidsgrove Athletic and Belper Town. He won the Staffordshire Senior Cup with Kidsgrove in 2004. He later coached at Notts County and Macclesfield Town.

== Early life ==
Steve Reginald Cherry was born at Nottingham General Hospital on 5 August 1960 and grew up in Calverton, Nottinghamshire. He was born into a mining family: his parents were Harold and Lonorah Cherry, a colliery electrician and housewife respectively. As a teenager, he attended a brief goalkeeping course at Nottingham Forest and had an unsuccessful trial with Notts County, though turned down the opportunity to play for Clifton All Whites after feeling dejected from his failed trial with Notts County. In 1975, at the age of 15, he played in goal for local village teams Calverton Colliery and Calverton United, as well as for Calverton Youth Wing. He had the opportunity to follow his father into the mines should his fledging football career not work out.

== Career ==
=== Derby County ===
Cherry started his career with a five-day trial at Derby County, having been scouted by Ernie Roberts playing for Calverton Youth Wing in a 7–1 defeat to Ilkeston U16s. Having impressed during the trial he was placed in the club's youth team on wages of £12.50-a-week and in 1976 he signed a two-year apprenticeship contract. He was on the bench for the first round of the UEFA Cup against Irish club Finn Harps in the 1976–77 season due to Colin Boulton being out on loan and Steve Bowtell being illegible. He represented the Midland Intermediate League, though had his reserve team opportunities limited until Boulton left the club. He was given his first professional contract in 1978, still with six months left to run of his apprenticeship contract. He was called up to the England Youth Team later in the year and won four caps: two playing against Las Palmas Select' team, one against the USSR and one against Italy. He was dropped in favour of John Lukic after a 2–1 defeat to Italy.

Cherry started his first competitive game for Derby as John Middleton was ruled unfit due to a shoulder injury for a First Division fixture against Southampton at the Baseball Ground on 16 February 1980. The match finished 2–2, with David Watson and Graham Baker scoring for the visitors. He kept his first-team place for the following game at home to Tottenham Hotspur, which Derby won 2–1; however, he was then sidelined after injuring his ankle slipping on the pavement outside his home whilst trying to prevent his kitten from running away. He returned to the starting eleven in a 3–1 win against Manchester City on 24 April and was named as man of the match. Derby were relegated at the end of the 1979–80 season and the club signed two new goalkeepers: 34-year-old Roger Jones and 24-year-old Yakka Banovic.

Cherry was not selected by Derby manager Colin Addison throughout the 1980–81 season and also picked up an ankle injury in October. Upon his return to fitness he joined Port Vale on loan in November. Manager John McGrath had sold regular custodian Trevor Dance, and was forced to enter the loan market after Mark Harrison was struck down with injury. Cherry was in goal for eight matches, four each in the Fourth Division and FA Cup. He conceded three goals in his final game for the "Valiants" in a 3–0 defeat at Enfield in a Third Round FA Cup Replay that was played on live television on 6 January 1981, the club's first defeat to non-League opposition in over 50 years. He admitted his performance that day was "embarrassing". Banovic was transfer-listed early in the 1981–82 season and Cherry was picked as stand in for an injured Jones against Bolton Wanderers on 23 September. The team struggled and Addison was replaced as manager by Johnny Newman in January. Derby finished the campaign 16th in the Second Division, with Cherry limited to just four appearances.

The 1982–83 season also started badly, and Cherry replaced Banovic in goal in October. Though Cherry was pleased with his own performance and that of the team, losses continued, and Newman resigned the following month. New manager Peter Taylor kept Cherry in goal, who would save a penalty from Kevin Keegan in a 1–0 defeat to Newcastle United at St James' Park on 27 December. On 8 January, he kept a clean sheet as Derby beat East Midlands derby rivals Nottingham Forest 2–0 in the FA Cup. They went on to beat Chelsea in the following round and reached the fifth round of the competition, where they were knocked out by Manchester United. Writing in his autobiography, Cherry cited the defeat to United as his career-best performance as he made difficult saves to deny Frank Stapleton, Norman Whiteside and Steve Coppell, and was only beaten late on by Whiteside for the game's only goal. His performance was described on Match of the Day as "a most accomplished exhibition in the art of goalkeeping" by Jimmy Hill, with Bob Wilson adding that he was "brilliant". Derby avoided relegation after going on a 15-match unbeaten run towards the end of the 1982–83 season and ended up posting a 12th-place finish. Cherry was voted the club's Player of the Year in May 1983.

The 1983–84 season opened with a 5–0 defeat by Chelsea at Stamford Bridge. The team continued to lose games and concede goals, leaving Cherry to bemoan poor defending that frequently left him exposed. Derby performed well in the FA Cup, though, and Cherry kept a clean sheet in a 0–0 draw away at Plymouth Argyle in the sixth round, denying Gordon Staniforth on multiple occasions. However, he conceded directly from a corner kick in the replay and felt "lower than the village idiot", whilst goalscorer Andy Rogers admitted the goal was "an absolute fluke". Derby were relegated at the end of the campaign, and Cherry rejected new manager Arthur Cox's offer of a new three-year contract starting at £275-a-week. He also turned down an offer of £450-a-week from former Derby manager Tommy Docherty, who was now in charge at Wolverhampton Wanderers.

=== Walsall ===
Derby teammate Steve Buckley recommended Cherry to his brother, Walsall manager Alan Buckley, who won Cherry's signature with the promise of a £17,500 signing-on fee. Walsall paid Derby a £25,000 fee in August 1984. He replaced Ron Green as the "Saddlers" number one and enjoyed a good start to the 1984–85 Third Division campaign. Walsall played former club Derby four times during the season as they drew them in the first round of the Associate Members' Cup and Cherry was subjected to taunting from Derby fans throughout the games, which he admitted "was an occupational hazard, but it still gets to you". He was an instant success with the Walsall fans however, and was voted as the club's Player of the Season.

Walsall beat Preston North End 7–3 and Port Vale 2–1 (after a replay) to reach the third round of the FA Cup against First Division club Manchester City on 4 January 1986. City won the tie 3–1 after Peter Hart's back-pass to Cherry was held up in the snow 10 yards (9.1 m) short of the goalkeeper, leaving Paul Simpson to convert a simple chance to take the lead. Walsall went on to post a sixth-place finish at the end of the 1985–86 season, with former club Derby claiming the third and final automatic promotion place. Buckley was sacked, much to Cherry's surprise, and new manager Tommy Coakley brought in goalkeeper Mark Prudhoe to be the club's new number one. Demoted to the reserves, Cherry was permitted to look for a move away from Fellows Park. Despite being injured with a sprained thumb he came on as a substitute in a youth team game against Derby County, playing outfield, and scored a headed goal past Mark Grew.

=== Plymouth Argyle ===
Cherry was sold to Plymouth Argyle for £19,000 fee in November 1986, having impressed on a week-long trial at the Second Division club, and took a signing-on fee of £18,000. Manager Dave Smith brought him in as a replacement for popular 34-year-old goalkeeper Geoff Crudgington, and gave Cherry his debut in a 1–0 defeat at Stoke City on 6 December. It was the start of a poor run of form for the "Pilgrims" and Cherry became unpopular with supporters at Home Park. He was booed before the FA Cup tie with Arsenal on 31 January and frequently abused during the match as Plymouth were beaten 6–1. Argyle missed out on the play-offs by three points at the end of the 1986–87 season after losing the final game of the campaign 4–2 at Derby County.

Cherry felt that long travel times from Devon to his Midlands home were not helping his form, so he moved to Plymouth in the summer of 1987. He enjoyed a good 1987–88 season and a much-improved relationship with the fans, being rewarded with the club's Player of the Year award with 34% of the vote, more than double the percentage received by second-placed Mark Smith. However, he put in a transfer request as he and his wife missed their families in Nottingham. Manager Ken Brown allowed him to live in Nottingham and train at the City Ground with Brian Clough's Nottingham Forest team whilst he looked for a new club and whilst Plymouth looked for a new goalkeeper. The club finally found their replacement by signing Rhys Wilmot from Arsenal, which allowed Cherry to join Chesterfield in the Third Division for a three-month loan period from January. He made his debut for Paul Hart's "Spireites" on 2 January and recalled making one of his best-ever saves in the 3–1 win at Sheffield United. He played his final game for Chesterfield on 11 February, keeping a clean sheet in a 3–0 win over Notts County at Saltergate and impressing County manager Neil Warnock in the process.

=== Notts County ===
Cherry was signed by Notts County in February 1989 for a £70,000 fee. He was Neil Warnock's first signing as the club's manager. He started on wages of £425-a-week and took home a signing-on fee of £6,666. Cherry later compared joining his hometown club as like "winning the lottery" and "my family has supported Notts for more than a 100 years". He immediately replaced Mick Leonard in goal as Warnock built his own team. County narrowly missed out on the Third Division play-offs at the end of the 1988–89 season after losing just four of their remaining 18 games. He kept a clean sheet on the opening day of the 1989–90 campaign, a 1–0 win at Leyton Orient, and though they were beaten by Blackpool in August, the "Magpies" lost just three of their remaining 22 games in 1989. The team were unbeaten in their final 15 games of the season and qualified for the play-offs in third-place. County secured promotion by winning the play-off final with a 2–0 victory over Tranmere Rovers in Notts County's first ever trip to Wembley.

County adapted well to the Second Division, winning their first four games of the 1990–91 season and running nine games unbeaten in December. On 16 February, he was described by reporter Sue Mott as being "all reflex and brilliance" as he kept a clean sheet in a 1–0 victory over top-flight Manchester City at Meadow Lane in the fifth round of the FA Cup. Cherry later recalled that Warnock had taken the team sledging in the snow at Wollaton Park in order to relax before the match. County lost 2–1 to Tottenham Hotspur in the following round, with Paul Gascoigne's winning goal described as "planted with such precision that even Cherry could do nothing about it" by BBC commentator John Motson. In the league, County won their final seven games of the season to qualify for the play-offs in fourth-place. Cherry was criticised for conceding a scrappy goal in the first leg of the play-off semi-final draw with Middlesbrough, though he would keep his 18th clean sheet of the season as County won the second leg 1–0 to secure a place in the play-off final against Brighton & Hove Albion. In the final a brace from Tommy Johnson and a goal from Dave Regis won the game for County, despite a late consolation goal from Dean Wilkins, winning a promotion for the club and a £12,000 win bonus for each of the players.

The 1991–92 season saw Cherry play top-flight football for the first time in 11 years, and he opened by the campaign by being named as man of the match in a 2–0 defeat to Manchester United at Old Trafford. County picked up 15 points from their opening 11 games and Cherry signed a new four-year contract with the club; chairman Derek Pavis said that Cherry and midfielder Don O'Riordan's signings had "completed the jigsaw" for the club. On 22 October, County beat Sheffield United on a penalty shoot-out in the Full Members' Cup, with Cherry saving four of United's five penalties. Four days later he was named as man of the match in a 2–0 defeat to Arsenal at Highbury, having had to make four diving saves from Ian Wright whilst wearing a pair of gloves borrowed from opposition goalkeeper David Seaman following a mix-up before the game. Another man of the match performance came in the Nottingham derby game on 11 January, in a 1–1 draw at Nottingham Forest. On 25 February, he came to the aid of Wimbledon striker John Fashanu after Fashanu was knocked unconscious following a collision with Craig Short. Fashanu said that "I could feel my tongue slipping down my throat as I was lying on the ground... I owe Steve Cherry an awfully big debt". On 10 March, he gave away a penalty, which he subsequently saved to earn another man of the match award, though the 0–0 home draw with Aston Villa left County in the relegation zone. They ended the season with a 2–1 win over Luton Town that saw both clubs relegated, though they would technically remain in the First Division as the Second Division was now renamed due to the creation of the Premier League. A relegation clause in Cherry's contract saw his salary reduced by 20%, though he was named as the club's Player of the Year – his fourth such award at four different clubs.

Cherry was unhappy with his wage reduction and became unsettled early in the 1992–93 season, whilst key first-team players such as Tommy Johnson, Paul Rideout and Dave Regis were sold off to fund a £3.4 million redevelopment of Meadow Lane. Warnock attempted to sign Alan Kelly for a £150,000 transfer fee to replace Cherry, as Kelly was himself in a wage dispute with Preston North End. Cherry was dropped in favour of Bob Catlin for the season opener at Birmingham City, though was returned to the starting line-up the following week. He kept his place despite the team winning only four of their next 19 games and despite him fracturing a finger in November and playing on with the aid of pain-killing injections. He was named as man of the match during a 0–0 draw at Portsmouth on 19 December, but the team still found wins hard to come by, and Warnock was sacked the following month. Warnock's successor, Mick Walker, steered the club to a 17th-place finish as they stabilised in the second tier. However, Cherry's weight became an issue as he reached 14 stone (200 lb; 89 kg).

County suffered a poor start to the 1993–94 campaign, losing 11–2 on aggregate to Newcastle United in the second round of the League Cup, with Andy Cole scoring a hat-trick in both legs. County fared much better in the Anglo-Italian Cup, reaching the Wembley final against Brescia after beating Southend United on penalties in the semi-final. Brescia won the final 1–0 after Gabriele Ambrosetti chipped Cherry to claim the game's only goal. The league campaign ended with a 2–0 loss at Oxford United that saw County narrowly miss out on the play-offs with a seventh-place finish.

Walker was sacked in September 1994 and new manager Russell Slade dropped Cherry for Paul Reece in December, saying "he was out of form and when you're bottom of the league you can't complain if the manager makes changes". Howard Kendall replaced Slade as manager the following month and signed Australian goalkeeper Jason Kearton on loan from Everton to be the club's new number one. Cherry put in extra work in training to lose 11 pounds in weight and was rewarded with a place in the Anglo-Italian Cup final game with Ascoli at Wembley on 19 March. Goals from Tony Agana and Devon White were enough to secure a 2–1 victory, though Cherry was substituted on 75 minutes. However, County won just one of their remaining ten league games and were relegated in last place at the end of the 1994–95 season, whilst Cherry was released.

=== Later career ===
Cherry signed for Glenn Roeder's Watford in July 1995 on a £30,000 a-year salary, with a £15,000 signing-on fee. He had received offers from Norwegian club Tromsø and a club in Hong Kong but decided to remain in England. He featured in just four First Division matches in the 1995–96 season as Kevin Miller was Watford's regular custodian. Cherry left Vicarage Road to return to former club Plymouth Argyle on a three-month loan starting in February, in a move that reunited him with former boss Neil Warnock. He played 19 games for the club and kept a clean sheet for Plymouth in the Third Division play-off final at Wembley, as his team won promotion with a 1–0 victory over Darlington.

Cherry then moved on to Rotherham United, after being offered a two-year contract on £400-a-week (with a £20,000 signing-on fee) at Millmoor by management duo Archie Gemmill and John McGovern. However, Danny Bergara replaced Gemmill and McGovern as manager before the start of the season, and signed goalkeeper Kevin Pilkington on loan from Manchester United. Cherry started the 1996–97 season in goal as the team picked up just two points from their opening eight league games, with Pilkington taking his first-team place in October. Cherry played 23 league and cup games for the "Millers", before leaving the club by mutual consent in January. He went on to play on a part-time basis for Kettering Town after being contacted by manager Steve Berry. He turned down an offer from Bolton Wanderers manager Colin Todd to be the club's third-choice goalkeeper and instead joined Kettering's Conference rivals Rushden & Diamonds in March 1997 on wages of £400-a-week, with a £20,000 signing-on fee. He played ten games for the Diamonds at the end of the 1996–97 season as the ambitious newly formed club began to build a strong squad under the ownership of Max Griggs.

Cherry featured eight times at the start of the 1997–98 season before being dropped by manager Brian Talbot. Talbot released him from his contract at Nene Park in September 1997 and set him up for a part-time arrangement at Rothwell Corinthians in the United Counties League Division One. He swiftly joined Northern Premier League Premier Division side Gainsborough Trinity on wages of £165-a-week, with the promise of a £500 signing-on fee from manager Steve Richards. He returned to the Conference with Stalybridge Celtic in January 1998, making ten appearances in a brief stay at Bower Fold. He played the opening game of the Third Division 1998–99 season for Mansfield Town on 9 August 1998, a 3–0 defeat at Brentford, as regular custodian Ian Bowling was unavailable and Steve Parkin needed a goalkeeper for the one match. He later provided cover for Oldham Athletic, with Oldham manager Andy Ritchie providing a £200 fee to be in the match-day squad against Wycombe Wanderers.

Cherry spent three months coaching at Notts County under Sam Allardyce in 1999. He joined Lincoln City as the club's goalkeeping coach in 2001 and registered as a player after signing on non-contract terms in March 2003 to provide cover for first-choice goalkeeper Alan Marriott. He spent the 2003–04 season playing for Kidsgrove Athletic in the Northern Premier League Division One and helped the club to win their first Staffordshire Senior Cup with victory over Stafford Rangers in the final. He joined Kidsgrove as cover for the injured Phil McGing and his son also joined the club at the same time. Kidsgrove reported that they were the first club in the country to have father and son goalkeepers in the squad at the same time. He later played for Belper Town. In 2006 he returned to Notts County as a part-time goalkeeping coach, leaving when Ian McParland replaced Steve Thompson as manager the following year. He was appointed as goalkeeping coach at Macclesfield Town in July 2008, but left the job in May 2010 after an illness required that he undergo heart surgery.

== Personal and later life ==
He married Julie, a secretary, on 22 December 1979. They had two children - Jonathan (1985) and Emma (1987). They divorced in 2012, and he later married Fiona. He began working as a forklift driver at Imperial Tobacco in Nottingham in 1999. His son, Jon (born 1985), played semi-professional football for Arnold Town and Kidsgrove Athletic after being released from Notts County as a teenager. He published his autobiography, Cherry Picking, in 2019. The book was written by Jonathan Nicholas, who in his former career had patrolled around the Meadow Lane pitch as a policeman when Cherry played as a goalkeeper at Notts County. The book was launched in Nottingham, with proceeds of the launch going towards a Myelodysplastic syndrome charity.

== Career statistics ==
Appearances and goals by club, season and competition
Club	Season	League			FA Cup		Other		Total	
Club	Season	Division	Apps	Goals	Apps	Goals	Apps	Goals	Apps	Goals
Derby County	1979–80	First Division	4	0	0	0	0	0	4	0
Derby County	1980–81	Second Division	0	0	0	0	0	0	0	0
Derby County	1981–82	Second Division	4	0	0	0	0	0	4	0
Derby County	1982–83	Second Division	31	0	3	0	2	0	36	0
Derby County	1983–84	Second Division	38	0	5	0	2	0	45	0
Derby County	Total		77	0	8	0	4	0	89	0
Port Vale (loan)	1980–81	Fourth Division	4	0	4	0	0	0	8	0
Walsall	1984–85	Third Division	41	0	3	0	10	0	54	0
Walsall	1985–86	Third Division	30	0	4	0	6	0	40	0
Walsall	Total		71	0	7	0	16	0	94	0
Plymouth Argyle	1986–87	Second Division	21	0	1	0	0	0	22	0
Plymouth Argyle	1987–88	Second Division	37	0	3	0	1	0	41	0
Plymouth Argyle	1988–89	Second Division	15	0	1	0	4	0	20	0
Plymouth Argyle	Total		73	0	5	0	5	0	83	0
Chesterfield (loan)	1988–89	Third Division	10	0	0	0	3	0	13	0
Notts County	1988–89	Third Division	18	0	0	0	0	0	18	0
Notts County	1989–90	Third Division	46	0	1	0	12	0	59	0
Notts County	1990–91	Second Division	46	0	4	0	9	0	59	0
Notts County	1991–92	First Division	42	0	3	0	5	0	50	0
Notts County	1992–93	First Division	44	0	1	0	4	0	49	0
Notts County	1993–94	First Division	45	0	3	0	12	0	60	0
Notts County	1994–95	First Division	25	0	2	0	6	0	33	0
Notts County	Total		266	0	14	0	48	0	328	0
Watford	1995–96	First Division	4	0	0	0	0	0	4	0
Plymouth Argyle (loan)	1995–96	Third Division	16	0	0	0	3	0	19	0
Rotherham United	1996–97	Second Division	20	0	0	0	3	0	23	0
Rushden & Diamonds	1996–97	Conference	10	0	0	0	0	0	10	0
Rushden & Diamonds	1997–98	Conference	8	0	0	0	0	0	8	0
Rushden & Diamonds	Total		18	0	0	0	0	0	18	0
Stalybridge Celtic	1997–98	Conference	10	0	0	0	0	0	10	0
Mansfield Town	1998–99	Third Division	1	0	0	0	0	0	1	0
Career total			570	0	38	0	82	0	690	0

== Honours ==
Notts County

- Football League Second Division play-offs: 1991
- Football League Third Division play-offs: 1990
- Anglo-Italian Cup: 1994–95; runner-up: 1993–94

Plymouth Argyle

- Football League Third Division play-offs: 1996

Kidsgrove Athletic

- Staffordshire Senior Cup: 2003–04

Individual

- Derby County Player of the Year: 1983
- Walsall Player of the Season: 1984–85
- Plymouth Argyle Player of the Year: 1988
- Notts County Player of the Year: 1992
