= Paul Devlin (footballer) =

Scottish footballer

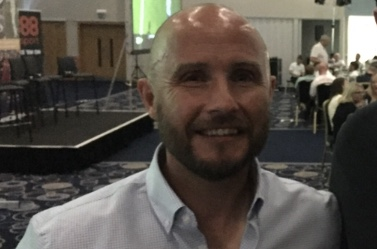
- Devlin in June 2018

Personal information
- Full name: Paul John Devlin
- Date of birth: 14 April 1972 (age 54)
- Place of birth: Birmingham, England
- Height: 5 ft 8 in (1.73 m)
- Position: Midfielder

Youth career
- Boldmere St. Michaels
- St Johns Celtic
- Tamworth

Senior career*
Years	Team	Apps	(Gls)
198?–1990	Tamworth		
1990	Armitage 90		
1990–1992	Stafford Rangers	50	(7)
1992–1996	Notts County	141	(25)
1996–1998	Birmingham City	76	(28)
1998–2002	Sheffield United	147	(24)
1998	→ Notts County (loan)	5	(0)
2002	→ Birmingham City (loan)	13	(1)
2002–2003	Birmingham City	34	(3)
2003–2006	Watford	79	(6)
2006	Walsall	8	(1)
2006	Bohemians	6	(1)
2006	Tamworth	4	(0)
2006	Sutton Coldfield Town		
2007–2008	Halesowen Town	26	(9)
2008	Rugby Town	1	(0)
2008	Sutton Coldfield Town	1	(1)
2008–2009	Stratford Town	6	(2)
2012	Romulus		
Total		597	(108)

International career
2002–2003	Scotland	10	(0)
2003	Scotland B	1	(0)
- * Club domestic league appearances and goals

Paul John Devlin (born 14 April 1972) is a former footballer who played as a midfielder or forward. He made more than 500 appearances in the Football League and Premier League, as well as playing in the League of Ireland for Bohemians and spending several years in non-league football. He was capped ten times for the Scotland national team.

== Club career ==
=== Early life and club career ===
Devlin was born and raised in the Erdington district of Birmingham and attended Perry Common Comprehensive School. After leaving school he trained as a chef in a hotel and on day release at college. He played youth football for Boldmere St. Michaels, St John's Celtic and Tamworth before making 12 appearances for Tamworth's first team as a teenager. Released by Tamworth in 1990, Devlin joined Armitage 90 of the Staffordshire Senior League, but was not there long; in November, Conference club Stafford Rangers paid £2000 for his services, and a 40% sell-on clause was included in the deal. He made 24 appearances (19 starts) in the 1990–91 Conference, and attracted attention from teams at a rather higher level. A lengthy trial with League runners-up Liverpool brought an offer in excess of £100,000 from manager Graeme Souness in September 1991, but Stafford Rangers turned it down. Amid interest from other top-flight clubs, Devlin had a trial with Leeds United before, in February 1992, a £60,000 bid from Notts County was accepted. He had scored 7 goals from 50 Conference matches over his 15-month spell.

=== Notts County ===
The 19-year-old Devlin signed for the First Division club on 18 February 1992. By the time he made his Football League debut, starting in a 1–0 win at home to Coventry City on 11 April, County were well on the way to relegation. By his second and last appearance of the season, second-tier football for 1992–93 was confirmed. The following season, he was gradually eased into the first team: his first league appearance was as a substitute on 26 September, he made his first league start three days later, and he was more or less a first-team regular for the next couple of months, by which time County were firmly established in the relegation places. After Warnock was replaced by Mick Walker in January 1993, Devlin returned to the starting eleven and remained in it to the end of the season. He scored his first Football League goal in a 3–3 draw away to Grimsby Town on 27 February, and scored twice more to help the team retain their second-tier status with a 17th-place finish.

In the 1993–94 season, only two outfield players made more league appearances than Devlin's 41, as the team missed out on the play-offs by one position. They also reached the final of that season's Anglo-Italian Cup. Devlin scored against Southend United in the semi-final second leg to take the tie to penalties; County won the shootout, but lost to Brescia in the final. County struggled under a succession of managers in 1994–95. Victory in that season's Anglo-Italian Cup, in which Devon White's winning header against Ascoli came from Devlin's cross. preceded relegation to the third tier. Devlin was left out of the starting eleven towards the end of the season, which as the team's top scorer he found particularly frustrating, and submitted an unsuccessful transfer request; a second request was accepted.

Following this second relegation, with the management under pressure to cut wages and generate income from transfers, there were several departures. Devlin stayed, under orders from manager Steve Thompson to learn patience – "Devlin wants the ball and thinks he should have it all the time ... He's got to become less impatient when we don't get the ball out to him" – and three months into the season, he had five league goals and Notts were third in the table. He remained in the team, and the team remained in contention for promotion, although his goalscoring tailed off. On 1 March 1996, Devlin and Andy Legg were sold to First Division club Birmingham City for £500,000 the pair; both the "crowd favourites" were out of contract at the end of the season. Thompson pointed out that until his goal against AFC Bournemouth three days prior, Devlin had gone 13 matches without scoring, that he was a Birmingham boy who had been well aware of the club's interest in him, and that the whole fee would go towards strengthening the team.

=== Birmingham City ===
Devlin scored twice against Wolverhampton Wanderers on 4 March to give his new team their first league win of the year, and by the end of the season had taken his tally to seven from sixteen matches. When Trevor Francis replaced Barry Fry as manager, his high-profile signings included strikers Paul Furlong and Mike Newell at a cost of ten times the £225,000 that Fry paid for Devlin. Nevertheless, Devlin played regularly, finished as top scorer with 16 league goals, 19 in total, and was chosen player of the season.

He scored in each of the first three league matches the following season, but fell out with the manager. Amid much contradictory information and mutual recrimination, Devlin was used increasingly as a substitute, and made his last league appearance on 13 December. Francis dropped him to the reserves after his refusal to agree a new contract and what the Birmingham Post dubbed "a catalogue of tantrum-throwing", preferring the pacy Nicky Forster to partner Furlong. Soon afterwards, Devlin gave up his Sports Argus newspaper column to team-mate Ian Bennett, who wrote that "because of [Devlin's] current situation at the club it became increasingly difficult [for him] to write about the goings on". Out of contract at the end of the season, his valuation dropped systematically as the season wore on, and he was finally sold to divisional rivals Sheffield United in March 1998 for an initial £200,000, an additional £50,000 contingent on promotion, and a 15% sell-on clause. Devlin said he was sad to leave, and felt that had the manager rated him, he "wouldn't have been forced out and made to train with the reserves and kids for the last few months. Money wasn't the issue"; Francis suggested that Sheffield United were "one of the few clubs who have the capacity to pay out the sort of salary that attracts Paul."

=== Sheffield United ===
Devlin began his Sheffield United career working under Steve Thompson, his last manager at Notts County. He made a string of substitute appearances before his full debut on 13 April in a 1–1 draw away to Swindon Town, and scored his first goal in a 3–3 draw at Tranmere Rovers. He was cup-tied for the team's run to the FA Cup semi-final, but started both legs of the play-offs, in which they lost to Sunderland on aggregate after Lionel Perez made a "truly world-class save to thwart Paul Devlin's piledriver from 15 yards (14 m)" before recovering to save a follow-up header.

Devlin showed himself to be a hard-working player, but with a habit of getting booked, picking up 11 yellow cards in his first season with the club. He notched 24 goals in his 145 games for the club. November 1998 briefly saw him loaned back to Notts County where he played a further five times.

He was chosen as Sheffield United's Player of the Year for 1999–2000.

Despite having signed a four-year contract during the 2000–01 season, Devlin asked for a pay rise in September 2001, and submitted a transfer request when he was turned down. He was dropped to the reserves, and suggested that he was being made a scapegoat. After Birmingham City's approach to take him on loan was rejected, Devlin told the media how he "would walk over broken glass to come back." Although he believed that Steve Bruce, who had tried to sign him for Crystal Palace, would do so again once his appointment as Birmingham manager was made official, and a deal was reportedly in place with a £400,000 fee agreed, this did not initially happen, and there was speculation that the club were reluctant to sanction signing another ageing player.

=== Birmingham City (second spell) ===
In early February 2002, Devlin signed for Birmingham City on a month's loan, while Paul Furlong made a similar move in the other direction. Devlin's loan was extended to three months, during which he made 11 appearances, scored once, an equaliser as Birmingham came back from two goals down to draw with top-of-the-table Wolverhampton Wanderers, and helped the team finish in the play-off positions; he signed a three-year permanent contract in May. Devlin converted his kick in the penalty shoot-out in the play-off final against Norwich City by which Birmingham gained promotion to the Premier League.

Devlin was sent off for violent conduct during a pre-season friendly in Scotland; because the referee reported the incident to the Football Association, he was suspended for the first three matches of the new season. He was selected to start the next, against Leeds United, and after 31 minutes, scored Birmingham's first Premier League goal at their St Andrew's ground with "a sweet right-foot shot that flew beyond [Paul] Robinson from 25 yards (23 m)". The 2–1 win was their first in the Premier League. Devlin made 32 league appearances that season, of which 20 were in the starting eleven, and scored three goals. In October 2002, he received his first call-up to the Scotland squad, and was capped ten times while a Birmingham player.

New arrivals including Argentina international Luciano Figueroa, top scorer in the 2002–03 Clausura, and club-record signing David Dunn pushed Devlin down the pecking order. He made only two substitute appearances in the first month of the season, and was omitted from a matchday squad for the first time since his return to the club. Although he felt he could still contribute at Premier League level, and Bruce did not want him to go, Devlin believed he needed regular football to stand a chance of representing Scotland at Euro 2004.

=== Watford ===
In September 2003, Devlin turned down an initial loan move to West Ham United in favour of a three-year contract with First Division Watford, managed by Ray Lewington, who were in need of a winger after the death of Jimmy Davis. Devlin's wages and the £150,000 fee were funded on behalf of the financially struggling club by a "mystery benefactor", who was later confirmed to be former chairman Sir Elton John. He was sent off before half-time for two mistimed tackles in his second match, which Watford lost to a late Derby County goal, but by the end of the campaign, in which the team finished 16th, no outfield player had made more appearances. Writing on Watford fansite Blind Stupid and Desperate, Matt Rowson highlighted how Devlin's "experience, aggression, and tricksiness was employed to the irritation of opponents who regularly paid the compliment of double-marking him", but also thought him "Not the player to misplace or mistime a pass to, one suspects, nor a player that many referees look forward to officiating."

Away to Preston North End on the opening day of the 2004–05 season, Devlin scored an equaliser early in the second half and created chances for others, but gave away the penalty with which Preston won the match. He continued in the starting eleven until suffering a hamstring strain during a match in mid-September that was expected to keep him out for a month, but he aggravated the injury and only resumed a place on the bench at the end of November. He took his appearance tally to 23 before a toe injury that required surgery kept him out for the rest of the season.

While Devlin was out injured, Lewington was replaced by Aidy Boothroyd, under whose management the team avoided relegation. He saw enough in the player to retain his services and select him from the start of the 2005–06 season. He made 23 appearances, scoring twice, before being told that Chris Eagles was coming in to take over his position and he could leave on a free transfer. Although Devlin understood why Boothroyd would want "a young, exciting winger from Manchester United rather than a 33 year old with no resale value", he was disappointed with the decision.

=== Walsall ===
Keen to return to the West Midlands for family reasons, Devlin signed for League One club Walsall in mid-January 2006 for the rest of the season. He strained a calf on his debut, and was then sent off for elbowing an opponent when he returned to the team against Scunthorpe United in mid-February. In his next match after serving a three-match ban, he scored in a 1–1 draw with Swansea City. With five matches left of Walsall's ultimately unsuccessful struggle against relegation, after being left on the bench by manager Kevan Broadhurst, Devlin requested and was granted release from his contract.

=== Bohemians ===
Devlin had considered retirement after leaving Walsall but was persuaded by Gareth Farrelly to join Bohemians, of which he was player-manager, until the end of the League of Ireland season. He made his debut as a second-half substitute against Derry City on 7 July, started the next seven matches, scored once, from the penalty spot in a 3–0 win away to Bray Wanderers, and left Bohemians in late August after Farrelly was dismissed.

=== Later career in non-league ===
On his return to England, Devlin rejoined Tamworth, some 16 years after leaving the club. After a wait for international clearance that manager Mark Cooper claimed would not have happened were Tamworth a bigger club, Devlin played in four Conference matches and then left by mutual consent, as he was unable to commit the necessary time to training and particularly to travelling.

After a brief stint with Sutton Coldfield Town of the Southern League Division One Midlands, Devlin moved up a level with Halesowen Town in February 2007. He scored 11 goals from 31 appearances in all competitions. He was released in January 2008 to join another Southern League Premier club, Rugby Town, as player-assistant manager, a role he left for personal reasons after little more than a week.

Devlin was playing veterans' football before rejoining Sutton Coldfield Town at the end of March. It was the fourth time he had returned to a former club, the previous three being Notts County, Birmingham City and Tamworth. He scored a last-minute equaliser in his first game, but that proved to be his final appearance. Although he signed on for the 2008–09 season, he left before it started.

He signed for Stratford Town in October 2008, marking his debut with the equalising goal in a 2–2 draw with Rocester. By the end of January 2009, he had made nine appearances in all competitions, of which six were in the Midland Alliance (scoring twice), and remained on their books until at least February 2009. After a lengthy break during which he played veterans' football, he joined Romulus of the Northern Premier League Division One South in June 2012. In 2018, Devlin was playing Sunday league for Monica Star; among his team-mates were fellow former Premier League and international players, Darren Byfield, Lee Carsley and Lee Hendrie.

== International career ==
Although born in Birmingham, England, Devlin qualified to play for the Scotland team because his father was born in Coatbridge. At the age of 30, he made his debut in a friendly against Canada on 15 October 2002. After his home debut, against the Republic of Ireland at Hampden Park, Devlin said: "Playing at Hampden has always been a dream of mine and to finally achieve that made the match the proudest night of my career. I had 30-odd people in the stand watching me and it cost me an absolute fortune to make sure they could all be here. There were 23 of the clan from up here and a further seven flew up from down south."

His tenth and last cap was on 6 September 2003 against the Faroe Islands in a Euro 2004 qualifier. All ten senior appearances were made while Devlin was a Premier League player for Birmingham. He also played once for Scotland B, in a 2–1 win against Northern Ireland B in May 2003 in which the first Scottish goal came following Devlin's free kick.

== Career statistics ==
Appearances and goals by club, season and competition
Club	Season	League			National Cup (Note: Includes FA Cup and FAI Cup)		League Cup (Note: Includes Football League Cup and FAI League Cup)		Other		Total	
Club	Season	Division	Apps	Goals	Apps	Goals	Apps	Goals	Apps	Goals	Apps	Goals
Notts County	1991–92	First Division	2	0	—		—		—		2	0
Notts County	1992–93	First Division (Note: After the Premier League split from the Football League in 1992, the second tier of English football was renamed the First Division.)	32	3	0	0	2	0	0	0	34	3
Notts County	1993–94	First Division	41	7	3	1	4	0	9 (Note: Appearances in Anglo-Italian Cup)	2	57	10
Notts County	1994–95	First Division	40	9	2	0	4	1	6	2	52	12
Notts County	1995–96	Second Division	26	6	3	0	2	0	4 (Note: Appearances in Football League Trophy)	2	35	8
Notts County	Total		141	25	8	1	12	1	19	6	180	33
Birmingham City	1995–96	First Division	16	7	—		—		—		16	7
Birmingham City	1996–97	First Division	38	16	3	2	4	1	—		45	19
Birmingham City	1997–98	First Division	22	5	1	0	5	3	—		28	8
Birmingham City	Total		76	28	4	2	9	4	—		89	34
Sheffield United	1997–98	First Division	10	1	—		—		2 (Note: Appearances in Football League First Division play-offs)	0	12	1
Sheffield United	1998–99	First Division	33	5	4	1	3	0	—		40	6
Sheffield United	1999–2000	First Division	44	11	2	0	3	0	—		49	11
Sheffield United	2000–01	First Division	41	5	1	0	4	3	—		46	8
Sheffield United	2001–02	First Division	19	2	1	0	2	1	—		22	3
Sheffield United	Total		147	24	8	1	12	4	2	0	169	29
Notts County (loan)	1998–99	Second Division	5	0	—		—		—		5	0
Birmingham City	2001–02	First Division	13	1	—		—		2	0	15	1
Birmingham City	2002–03	Premier League	32	3	1	0	0	0	—		33	3
Birmingham City	2003–04	Premier League	2	0	—		—		—		2	0
Birmingham City	Total		47	4	1	0	0	0	2	0	50	4
Watford	2003–04	First Division	39	3	2	0	1	0	—		42	3
Watford	2004–05	Championship	17	1	2	0	4	0	—		23	1
Watford	2005–06	Championship	23	2	0	0	0	0	—		23	2
Watford	Total		79	6	4	0	5	0	—		88	6
Walsall	2005–06	League One	8	1	—		—		—		8	1
Bohemians	2006	League of Ireland	6	1	1	0	1	0	—		8	1
Tamworth	2006–07	Conference National	4	0	—		—		—		4	0
Career total			513	89	26	4	39	9	23	6	601	108

== Honours ==
Birmingham City

- Football League First Division play-offs: 2002

== See also ==
- List of Scotland international footballers born outside Scotland
