= Paul Harding (English footballer) =

English footballer

Personal information
- Full name: Paul John Harding
- Date of birth: 6 March 1964 (age 62)
- Place of birth: Mitcham, England
- Height: 5 ft 9 in (1.75 m)
- Position: Midfielder

Youth career
- Chelsea

Senior career*
Years	Team	Apps	(Gls)
- Wimbledon
- Sutton United
- Whyteleafe
- Epsom & Ewell
- Carshalton Athletic
- Dulwich Hamlet
1986–1990	Enfield	103	(19)
1990	Barnet	24	(5)
1990–1994	Notts County	54	(1)
1993	→ Southend United (loan)	5	(0)
1993	→ Watford (loan)	2	(0)
1993–1994	→ Birmingham City (loan)	4	(0)
1994–1995	Birmingham City	18	(0)
1995–1997	Cardiff City	36	(0)
1996	→ Kettering Town (loan)	6	(0)
- * Club domestic league appearances and goals

Paul John Harding (born 6 March 1964) is an English former professional footballer who played as a midfielder. He played 119 games in the Football League representing Notts County, Southend United, Watford, Birmingham City and Cardiff City.

== Playing career ==
Harding was born in Mitcham, Surrey. He began his football career as an apprentice with Chelsea, but did not progress to the first team, and worked as a bricklayer, playing part-time for a number of non-league clubs in the Surrey and south London area before joining Enfield of the Conference National, with whom he won the FA Trophy in 1988. In February 1990 he moved to Conference runners-up Barnet, and in September of the same year he and teammate Dave Regis signed for Notts County, newly promoted to the Football League Second Division.

Harding contributed to their second successive promotion, to the First Division via the play-offs, at the end of his first season with the club. Notts County had drawn the first leg of the play-off semi-final at Middlesbrough. In the second leg, following an injury to Phil Turner, Harding, who had played as a striker with Enfield, moved out of midfield to play in attack. Within minutes, he headed the only goal of the game, the first he had scored since joining the club. He appeared in the play-off final at Wembley Stadium, though only briefly, as an 81st-minute substitute. After the semi-final, Harding told the press that "turning pro with Notts County was a big gamble for me. But now I know that it was worth it."

In the quarter-final of the that season's FA Cup, with County leading First Division Tottenham Hotspur 1–0, Harding was elbowed by Tottenham's Paul Gascoigne, a sending-off offence which the referee allowed to go unpunished but which left Harding with a black eye. Gascoigne was instrumental in Tottenham's equalising goal and scored the winner.

Harding made 25 starts in the top flight as County were relegated back to the second tier. He fell out of favour, and spent time on loan at Southend United, Watford and Birmingham City, before joining the latter club on a permanent basis in January 1994 for a fee of £50,000. Harding made 26 appearances in all competitions for Birmingham before, in the 1995 close season, making his last move within the Football League, to Cardiff City where he was made captain. He played 36 league games for the club, and spent a short time on loan at Kettering Town where he played six times.

== Honours ==
Notts County

- Football League Second Division play-offs: 1991
