= Andy Williams (footballer, born 1962) =

English footballer

Personal information
- Full name: Andrew Williams
- Date of birth: 29 July 1962 (age 64)
- Place of birth: Birmingham, England
- Height: 6 ft 2 in (1.88 m)
- Position: Midfielder

Youth career
- Dudley Town
- Solihull Borough

Senior career*
Years	Team	Apps	(Gls)
1985–1986	Coventry City	9	(0)
1986–1988	Rotherham United	87	(13)
1988–1992	Leeds United	46	(3)
1991–1992	→ Port Vale (loan)	5	(0)
1992–1993	Notts County	39	(2)
1993	→ Huddersfield Town (loan)	6	(0)
1993–1995	Rotherham United	51	(0)
1995	→ Sheffield Wednesday (loan)	0	(0)
1995–1996	Hull City	34	(0)
1996	Scarborough	1	(0)
- Guiseley
- Gainsborough Trinity
- Matlock Town
- * Club domestic league appearances and goals

Andrew Williams (born 29 July 1962) is an English former footballer, who played for 278 league games in an eleven-year professional career in the Football League. He turned out for Coventry City, Rotherham United, Leeds United, Port Vale, Notts County, Huddersfield Town, Hull City and Scarborough. He also played for non-League sides Dudley Town, Solihull Borough, Guiseley, Gainsborough Trinity, and Matlock Town. He was named in the PFA Team of the Year for the Third Division in 1987–88, and helped Leeds to the Second Division title in 1989–90.

== Career ==
Williams worked as an accountant and started his football career in non-League with Dudley Town and Solihull Borough, before he was signed by First Division side Coventry City on 24 July 1985 for a fee of £20,000, at the age of 23. He played ten games for the club, before he was allowed to sign with Rotherham United of the Third Division in October 1986. The "Millers" were relegated at the end of the 1987–88 season after losing to Swansea City at the semi-final stage of the Fourth Division play-offs. Despite this, Williams was still chosen in the PFA Team of the Year for his strong performances throughout the season. He made 106 starts over the following two years, scoring 15 goals. His performances also won him a £175,000 move to Leeds United in November 1988, then a Second Division side. He went on to make 19 appearances in 1988–89, eleven of which were as a substitute. He was the first signing of manager Howard Wilkinson.

Leeds won promotion back to the top flight after topping the Second Division table at the end of the 1989–90 season; Williams made 13 league starts, scoring two goals (against Watford and Barnsley). His first-team appearances were limited by a groin injury. After spending five months out with his groin problem, he then suffered a fractured cheekbone after teammate Vinnie Jones accidentally hit him in the face with a cricket bat. United then went on to power to a fourth-place finish in the top-flight in 1990–91, with Williams making five starts and seven substitute appearances. Restricted to the odd appearance by the form of the Leeds midfield, in December 1991 he was loaned out to Second Division side Port Vale. He played five games for the "Valiants", who would finish the season in last place; in contrast Williams returned to Elland Road, where manager Howard Wilkinson was in the process of bringing Leeds the First Division title. Williams would be gone before the end of the season, however. In February 1992, he was sold to Notts County for a £115,000 fee. County were struggling in the First Division and lost their top-flight status at the end of the 1991–92 season.

After a mid-table finish in 1992–93, County loaned Williams out to Second Division Huddersfield Town at the start of the 1993–94 campaign. He played six games for the "Terriers" before he was allowed to re-sign with former club Rotherham United in October 1993. He struggled with a knee injury, and at the end of the 1994–95 season, he moved on to league rivals Hull City – who had tried to sign him in 1988 but lost out to Leeds. Hull finished bottom of the league in 1995–96, and so were relegated to the Third Division. Williams was a technically gifted midfielder whose style did not fit particularly well with Terry Dolan's approach at Hull. Williams left Hull but remained in the fourth tier, signing non-contract terms with Scarborough. He made his debut in a goalless home draw with Cardiff City on 17 August and also played in a League Cup draw at former club Hull three days later. This was to be his last professional game, though he did later turn out for non-League clubs Guiseley, Gainsborough Trinity, and Matlock Town.

== Style of play ==
The Rotherham United website states that Williams was a "tall midfielder with a deceptive turn of speed."

== Post-retirement ==
Williams now works as a performance manager for a company attached to Rotherham Council. He also plays Masters Football. He is a West Bromwich Albion supporter.

== Career statistics ==
Appearances and goals by club, season and competition
Club	Season	League			FA Cup		Other		Total	
Club	Season	Division	Apps	Goals	Apps	Goals	Apps	Goals	Apps	Goals
Coventry City	1985–86	First Division	8	0	0	0	1	0	9	0
Coventry City	1986–87	First Division	1	0	0	0	0	0	1	0
Coventry City	Total		9	0	0	0	1	0	10	0
Rotherham United	1986–87	Third Division	36	4	3	0	2	0	41	4
Rotherham United	1987–88	Third Division	36	6	3	0	7	2	46	8
Rotherham United	1988–89	Fourth Division	15	3	0	0	4	0	19	3
Rotherham United	Total		87	13	6	0	13	2	106	15
Leeds United	1988–89	Second Division	18	1	1	0	0	0	19	1
Leeds United	1989–90	Second Division	16	2	0	0	4	1	20	3
Leeds United	1990–91	First Division	12	0	0	0	7	1	19	1
Leeds United	1991–92	First Division	0	0	1	0	2	0	3	0
Leeds United	Total		46	3	2	0	13	2	61	5
Port Vale (loan)	1991–92	Second Division	5	0	0	0	0	0	5	0
Notts County	1991–92	First Division	15	1	0	0	0	0	15	1
Notts County	1992–93	First Division	22	1	1	0	1	0	24	1
Notts County	1993–94	First Division	2	0	0	0	2	0	4	0
Notts County	Total		39	2	1	0	3	0	43	2
Huddersfield Town (loan)	1993–94	Second Division	6	0	0	0	0	0	6	0
Rotherham United	1993–94	Second Division	34	0	1	0	2	0	37	0
Rotherham United	1994–95	Second Division	17	0	2	0	4	0	23	0
Rotherham United	Total		51	0	3	0	6	0	60	0
Hull City	1995–96	Second Division	34	0	1	0	4	0	39	0
Scarborough	1995–96	Third Division	1	0	0	0	1	0	2	0
Career total			278	18	13	0	41	4	332	22

== Honours ==
Leeds United

- Football League Second Division: 1989–90

Individual

- PFA Team of the Year: 1987–88 Third Division
