= Mark Smith (footballer, born 1960) =

English footballer (born 1960)

Personal information
- Full name: Mark Craig Smith
- Date of birth: 21 March 1960 (age 66)
- Place of birth: Sheffield, England
- Height: 6 ft 1 in (1.85 m)
- Position: Defender

Senior career*
| Years | Team | Apps | (Gls) |
| 1977–1987 | Sheffield Wednesday | 282 | (16) |
| 1987–1990 | Plymouth Argyle | 82 | (6) |
| 1990–1992 | Barnsley | 104 | (10) |
| 1992–1993 | Notts County | 5 | (0) |
| 1992 | → Port Vale (loan) | 6 | (0) |
| 1993 | → Huddersfield Town (loan) | 5 | (0) |
| 1993 | → Chesterfield (loan) | 6 | (1) |
| 1993–1994 | Lincoln City | 20 | (1) |
| Total | | 510 | (34) |

International career
| 1981–1982 | England U21 | 5 | (0) |

Managerial career
- 1996–1997: Notts County (caretaker)
- 2004: Sheffield Wednesday (caretaker)
- 2015: Chesterfield (caretaker)
- * Club domestic league appearances and goals

Mark Craig Smith (born 21 March 1960) is an English former professional football player and coach, and current loans manager at Sheffield United and a first-team coach at Ossett United.

An England under-21 international, he posted 510 league appearances in a 17-year career in the Football League. He spent the first ten years of his career at Sheffield Wednesday, and by the time he left for Plymouth Argyle in 1987 he had made 282 league appearances for Wednesday. During his time in Sheffield, he was named the club's Player of the Year in 1981, and Wednesday twice won promotion and twice appeared in the FA Cup semi-finals. He switched to Barnsley in 1990 and was named the club's Player of the Year in 1992. He signed with Notts County in 1992. He was loaned out to Port Vale, Huddersfield Town and Chesterfield, before he finished his career at Lincoln City in 1994. He then began work as a coach at various clubs, which included a one-game stint in charge of Sheffield Wednesday in 2004 in a caretaker manager capacity. He then returned to coaching and worked as caretaker-manager of Chesterfield in November 2015.

== Playing career ==
A local boy from Shirecliffe, Smith developed through the ranks and into the first team with Sheffield Wednesday in 1977. He was renowned for his prowess from the penalty spot, achieving a club record eleven successful penalty conversions in the 1979–80 season. During his time at Hillsborough, the club won promotion out of the Third Division in 1979–80 (a campaign in which Smith was named in the PFA Team of the Year), and were promoted out of the Second Division in 1983–84. Wednesday also reached the FA Cup semi-finals in 1982–83 and 1985–86, and posted a fifth-place finish in the First Division in 1985–86. Smith played a total of 282 league games for Wednesday during his ten years at Hillsborough, playing under Jack Charlton and then Howard Wilkinson. He was voted the club's Player of the Year in 1981. He won five caps for England under-21s, playing against the Republic of Ireland, Romania, Switzerland, Hungary and Poland.

Smith joined Dave Smith's Second Division Plymouth Argyle in 1987. He racked up 82 league appearances in three mid-table campaigns, the latter two of which were under the management of Ken Brown, before he moved on to league rivals Barnsley in 1990.

Mel Machin's side missed out on the play-offs on goal difference in 1990–91, but finished mid-table in 1991–92; Smith was named as the club's Player of the Year for the Player of the Year season. Smith played over 100 games for the "Tykes" in just under three years before joining Neil Warnock's Notts County in 1992. At age 32, it was at County where his career stuttered, he had loan spells with John Rudge's Port Vale, Huddersfield Town and Third Division Chesterfield. He scored on his Chesterfield debut on 3 April 1993, in a 2–1 win over Walsall. He only played between five and six league games at each of the four clubs (including Notts County).

In the summer of 1993, Smith joined Lincoln City, making his debut in the club's opening day 1–0 defeat at Colchester United on 14 August 1993. In March 1994, with manager Keith Alexander lacking an assistant, Smith was appointed to a player-coach role at the club. However, the appointment coincided with his final professional appearance in the 2–0 home victory over Colchester United on 15 March 1994.

== Coaching career ==
Following his dismissal as manager at the end of the 1993–94 season, Keith Alexander was offered his old role as youth team coach but instead opted for the same position at Mansfield Town with Smith appointed to the post at Lincoln City.

After a season at Sincil Bank, Smith moved on to a similar role at Notts County. Following the sacking of Colin Murphy and Steve Thompson, Smith was placed in temporary charge of the "Magpies" before the appointment of Sam Allardyce. Under Allardyce, Smith stepped up to become assistant manager.

Smith joined the academy at his former club Barnsley in 1998. He steered the club's youngsters to the FA Youth Cup semi-final in 2001–02, the defeat coming at the hands of eventual victors Aston Villa, the run including the defeat of Manchester United on penalties at Old Trafford on 1 March 2002. That success was followed up in the 2002–03 season with victory over Liverpool in the FA Youth Cup and the runners-up spot in the FA Premier Academy League Group B. At the end of his contract on 30 June 2003, Smith announced that he was leaving his post as Assistant Academy Director at Oakwell.

Smith linked up with his boyhood heroes Sheffield Wednesday, being appointed Academy under-19 coach on 1 July 2003. Following the departure of manager Chris Turner in September 2004, Smith was placed in temporary charge with Chris Marsden as his assistant; Smith declared it an honour to have the opportunity to manage the club he had both supported and played for. He presided over a 1–0 League Cup defeat to Coventry City on 22 September 2004 before reverting to his previous role following the appointment of Paul Sturrock as manager. Following a review of their academy structure, Smith departed Wednesday in June 2006.

The 2006–07 season saw Smith join Ilkeston Town as coach and assistant manager to Nigel Jemson; the two had been teammates at Notts County. In October 2006, speculation linked him with the vacant manager's position at Worksop Town but no appointment was forthcoming.

In October 2007, Smith was appointed to the position of International Youth Director at Sheffield United before moving into the role as a development coach for the club. This job involved working with the club's young professionals who had graduated from the academy and were looking to force their way into the first-team. He departed the club in June 2011, running a coaching school in Chapeltown for children aged between six and 11.

He was appointed youth team coach at Chesterfield in May 2013. He was appointed as the "Spireites" caretaker manager on 30 November, following the dismissal of Dean Saunders. He was succeeded by Danny Wilson on Christmas Eve.

Smith remained at Chesterfield as Academy Manager before returning to Sheffield United in August 2018 to take up the role of Loans Manager – which sees him manage all United players loaned out by the club. He combined this role with that of first-team coach at Ossett United in April 2021.

== Career statistics ==
=== Playing statistics ===
Appearances and goals by club, season and competition
| Club | Season | League | | | FA Cup | | Other | | Total | |
| Club | Season | Division | Apps | Goals | Apps | Goals | Apps | Goals | Apps | Goals |
|---|---|---|---|---|---|---|---|---|---|---|
| Sheffield Wednesday | 1977–78 | Third Division | 2 | 0 | 0 | 0 | 0 | 0 | 2 | 0 |
| Sheffield Wednesday | 1978–79 | Third Division | 21 | 0 | 9 | 0 | 2 | 0 | 32 | 0 |
| Sheffield Wednesday | 1979–80 | Third Division | 44 | 9 | 2 | 1 | 4 | 1 | 50 | 11 |
| Sheffield Wednesday | 1980–81 | Second Division | 41 | 1 | 1 | 0 | 5 | 0 | 47 | 1 |
| Sheffield Wednesday | 1981–82 | Second Division | 41 | 0 | 1 | 0 | 2 | 0 | 44 | 0 |
| Sheffield Wednesday | 1982–83 | Second Division | 41 | 2 | 8 | 1 | 4 | 0 | 53 | 3 |
| Sheffield Wednesday | 1983–84 | Second Division | 27 | 2 | 4 | 0 | 6 | 0 | 37 | 2 |
| Sheffield Wednesday | 1984–85 | First Division | 36 | 2 | 2 | 0 | 4 | 0 | 42 | 2 |
| Sheffield Wednesday | 1985–86 | First Division | 13 | 0 | 6 | 1 | 2 | 0 | 21 | 1 |
| Sheffield Wednesday | 1986–87 | First Division | 16 | 0 | 6 | 0 | 0 | 0 | 22 | 0 |
| Sheffield Wednesday | Total | | 282 | 16 | 39 | 3 | 29 | 1 | 350 | 20 |
| Plymouth Argyle | 1987–88 | Second Division | 41 | 6 | 2 | 0 | 3 | 0 | 46 | 6 |
| Plymouth Argyle | 1988–89 | Second Division | 35 | 0 | 3 | 0 | 4 | 1 | 42 | 1 |
| Plymouth Argyle | 1989–90 | Second Division | 6 | 0 | 0 | 0 | 3 | 0 | 9 | 0 |
| Plymouth Argyle | Total | | 82 | 6 | 5 | 0 | 10 | 1 | 97 | 7 |
| Barnsley | 1989–90 | Second Division | 25 | 3 | 3 | 1 | 0 | 0 | 28 | 4 |
| Barnsley | 1990–91 | Second Division | 37 | 6 | 2 | 0 | 8 | 1 | 47 | 7 |
| Barnsley | 1991–92 | Second Division | 38 | 1 | 1 | 0 | 2 | 0 | 41 | 1 |
| Barnsley | 1992–93 | First Division | 4 | 0 | 0 | 0 | 1 | 0 | 5 | 0 |
| Barnsley | Total | | 104 | 10 | 6 | 1 | 11 | 1 | 121 | 12 |
| Notts County | 1992–93 | First Division | 5 | 0 | 0 | 0 | 1 | 0 | 6 | 0 |
| Port Vale (loan) | 1992–93 | Second Division | 6 | 0 | 0 | 0 | 1 | 1 | 7 | 1 |
| Huddersfield Town (loan) | 1992–93 | Second Division | 5 | 0 | 0 | 0 | 0 | 0 | 5 | 0 |
| Chesterfield (loan) | 1992–93 | Third Division | 6 | 1 | 0 | 0 | 0 | 0 | 6 | 1 |
| Lincoln City | 1993–94 | Second Division | 20 | 1 | 1 | 0 | 5 | 0 | 26 | 1 |
| Career total | | | 510 | 34 | 51 | 4 | 57 | 4 | 618 | 42 |

=== Managerial statistics ===
Managerial record by team and tenure
| Team | From | To | Record | | | | |
| Team | From | To | P | W | D | L | Win % |
|---|---|---|---|---|---|---|---|
| Chesterfield (caretaker) | 4 December 2015 | 24 December 2015 | 4 | 0 | 2 | 2 | 0.0 |
| Total | | | 4 | 0 | 2 | 2 | 0.0 |

== Honours ==
Individual

- PFA Team of the Year (Third Division): 1979–80
- Sheffield Wednesday F.C. Player of the Year: 1981
- Barnsley F.C. Player of the Year: 1992

Sheffield Wednesday

- Football League Third Division third-place promotion: 1979–80
- Football League Second Division second-place promotion: 1983–84
