= Tony Agana =

English footballer

Personal information
- Full name: Patrick Anthony Olozinka Agana
- Date of birth: 2 October 1963 (age 63)
- Place of birth: Bromley, England
- Position: Striker

Senior career*
Years	Team	Apps	(Gls)
1983	Welling United		
1983–1987	Weymouth	137	(35)
1987–1988	Watford	15	(1)
1988–1991	Sheffield United	118	(42)
1991–1997	Notts County	145	(15)
1992	→ Leeds United (loan)	2	(0)
1997–1998	Hereford United	22	(7)
1998	Cliftonville		
1998–1999	Leek Town	20	(3)
1999–2001	Guiseley	26	(8)
2001–2002	Alfreton Town		
Total		485	(111)

International career
1986	England C	1	(1)

Managerial career
- 1999: Leek Town
- 1999–2001: Guiseley
- * Club domestic league appearances and goals

Patrick Anthony Olozinka Agana (born 2 October 1963) is an English former professional footballer who played as a striker.

Born in Bromley Agana started his career in non-league football, before turning fully professional with Watford. He later moved to Sheffield United where he enjoyed the most prolific spell of his career, making over 100 appearances for the Blades and playing in the top tier of English football. He subsequently moved to Notts County for whom he also played over 100 games before finishing his career playing for a number of non-league teams. He had a brief spell as manager of Leek Town before retiring from football in 2002.

== Career ==
=== Non-league and a move to Watford ===
Agana started his football career with non-league side Welling United whilst working full-time for an insurance company. When his employers moved their offices to Poole he became a part-time professional with Weymouth, signing for £4,500 in March 1984. He went on to make over 100 appearances for the south coast club and represented the England national game XI during his time there.

In August 1987 Agana moved into professional football with First Division club Watford, making his league début at the relatively late age of 23. Agana made 15 appearances for the Hertfordshire side, scoring one goal, as he acclimatised to league football.

=== Sheffield United ===
After only six months at Vicarage Road Agana was on the move again, this time to South Yorkshire side Sheffield United. Dave Bassett, the manager who had signed Agana for Watford, had been sacked in January 1988 and subsequently joined Sheffield United and within days sold Martin Kuhl to his former employers for £40,000, with Agana and Peter Hetherston moving to Bramall Lane as part of the deal.

He made his debut for United on 20 February 1988, scoring in a 1–0 home win against Barnsley. Despite this promising start the team was in decline and the club was relegated at the end of the season. The following season proved a different matter as Agana struck up a striking partnership with new signing Brian Deane. During the 1989–90 season he scored 24 goals in 46 appearances, which, along with a similar tally from strike partner Deane, helped United win promotion from the Second Division at the first time of asking, with Agana being named fans' player of the year. The following season saw more of the same, with United promoted again to take them into Division One. That was thanks in part once more to Agana's goals, which included a brace in the 5–2 victory at Leicester City that clinched promotion.

With The Blades playing top-flight football, Agana's role began to diminish as injuries and a loss of pace began to take their toll and he was eventually made available for transfer. In three years with the club he scored 52 goals in 154 matches.

=== Notts County and back to non-league ===
In November 1991 Agana signed for Notts County for a fee of £685,000 – which was a club record transfer fee at the time. He was loaned to Leeds United briefly in February 1992 and contributed to their 1992 First Division title with two league appearances. He went on to play 145 times for Notts County, scoring 15 goals.

After leaving County he went on to play for Hereford United, Cliftonville, Leek Town (including a six-game spell as caretaker manager in 1999) and Guiseley, where he was player-manager.

== Career after football ==
Following his retirement from football he studied computer visualisation at Sheffield Hallam University, graduating in 2004. Following his graduation he worked for the University of Manchester as a distance learning technology officer, as well as working for Sheffield United's matchday hospitality team. He then began working at Wingfield Academy in Rotherham as a technology support staff where he still works today.

In 2023, Agana was on a three-man independent panel which found former Crawley Town manager John Yems guilty of eleven counts of racial abuse against his own players and banned him from football for 18 months.

== Career statistics ==
Appearances and goals by club, season and competition
Club	Season	League			FA Cup		League Cup		Other		Total	
Club	Season	Division	Apps	Goals	Apps	Goals	Apps	Goals	Apps	Goals	Apps	Goals
Watford	1987–88	First Division	15	1	2	0	2	2	1 (Note: Appearance(s) in Full Members' Cup)	0	20	3
Sheffield United	1987–88	Second Division	12	2	—		—		1 (Note: Appearance(s) in Third Division play-offs)	0	13	2
Sheffield United	1988–89	Third Division	46	24	7	3	5	2	7 (Note: Three appearances one goal in Associate Members' Cup; four appearances one goal in Yorkshire & Humberside Cup)	2	65	31
Sheffield United	1989–90	Second Division	31	10	7	2	2	0	2 (Note: One appearance in Full Members' Cup; one appearance in Yorkshire & Humberside Cup)	0	42	12
Sheffield United	1990–91	First Division	16	2	0	0	2	1	0	0	18	3
Sheffield United	1991–92	First Division	13	4	—		3	0	0	0	16	4
Sheffield United	Total		118	42	14	5	12	3	10	2	154	52
Notts County	1991–92	First Division	13	1	2	0	—		2	0	17	1
Notts County	1992–93	First Division	29	2	1	0	1	1	0	0	31	3
Notts County	1993–94	First Division	20	4	2	1	1	0	4 (Note: Appearance(s) in Anglo-Italian Cup)	1	27	6
Notts County	1994–95	First Division	31	3	0	0	4	1	6	2	41	6
Notts County	1995–96	Second Division	29	2	1	0	3	0	7 (Note: Four appearances one goal in Football League Trophy; three appearances in Division Two play-offs)	1	40	3
Notts County	1996–97	Second Division	23	3	3	1	0	0	0	0	26	4
Notts County	Total		145	15	9	2	9	2	19	4	182	23
Leeds United (loan)	1991–92	First Division	2	0	—		—		—		2	0
Hereford United	1996–97	Third Division	5	2	—		—		—		5	2
Career total			285	60	25	7	23	7	30	6	363	80

== Honours ==
Individual

- PFA Team of the Year: 1988–89 Third Division
