= Meindert Dijkstra =

Dutch former footballer

Personal information
- Full name: Meindert Dijkstra
- Date of birth: 28 February 1967 (age 59)
- Place of birth: Breda, Netherlands
- Position: Full back

Senior career*
Years	Team	Apps	(Gls)
1985–1987	NAC	7	(0)
1987–1992	Willem II	101	(4)
1992–1994	Notts County	29	(1)
1994–1995	RBC	20	(1)
1995–1997	TOP Oss	32	(2)
Total		189	(8)
- * Club domestic league appearances and goals

Meindert Dijkstra (born 28 February 1967) is a Dutch former footballer who played primarily at right back. He spent a majority of his career playing in the Dutch leagues, only spending two seasons abroad when he played in England for Notts County. He is the father of Caitlin Dijkstra, who is also a professional footballer.

== Club career ==
Dijkstra began his career in 1985 with NAC Breda, before moving to local rivals Willem II two years later, where he spent five seasons. Following this he moved abroad and joined Notts County, before returning to Holland with RBC Roosendaal for the 1994/95 season, finally finishing his career at TOP Oss.

After retiring as a player, Dijkstra has been involved in academy football at several amateur sides in the North Brabant province.
