= Paul Reece =

English footballer

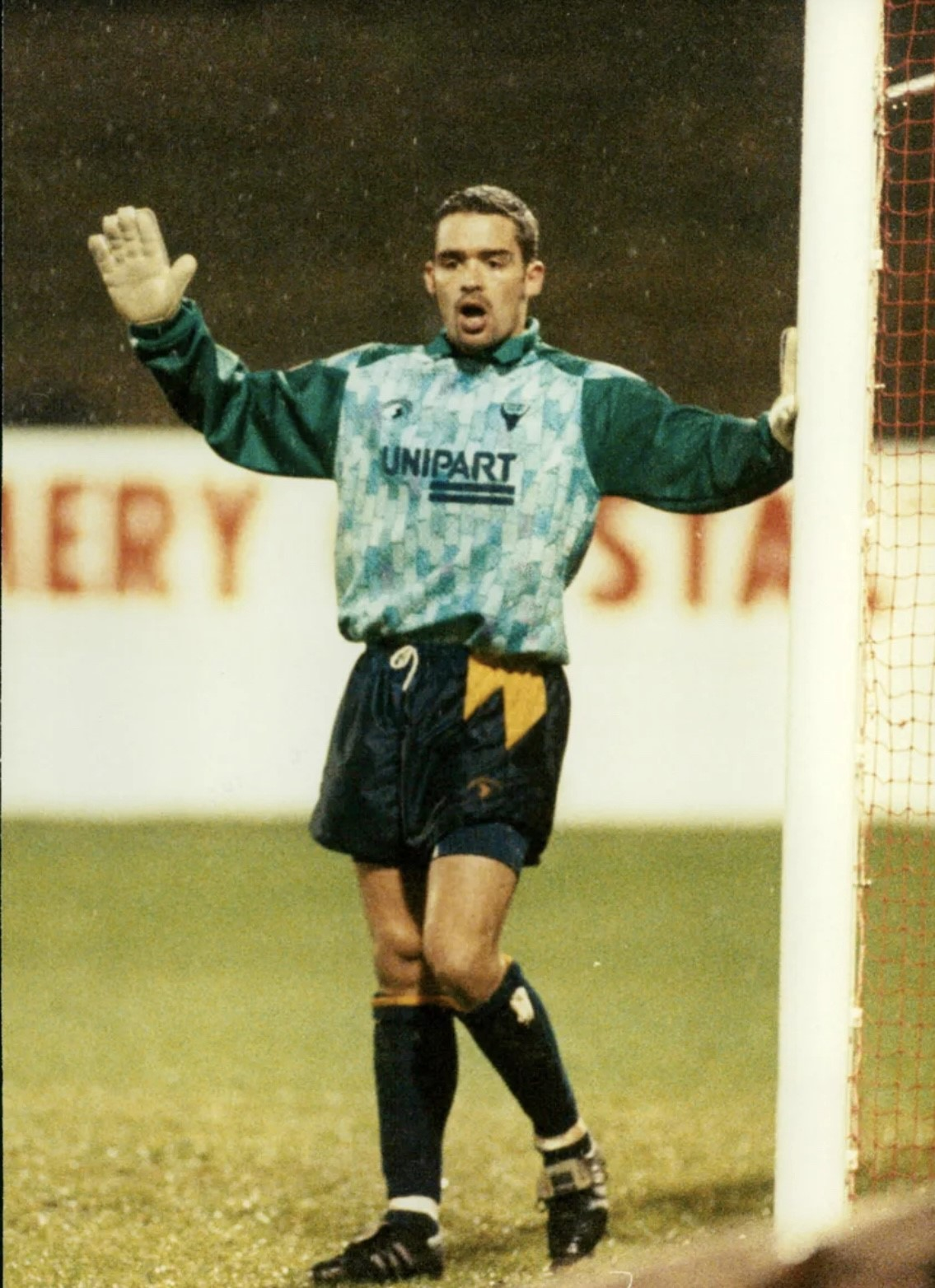
- Reece playing for Oxford United in 1992

Personal information
- Full name: Paul John Reece
- Date of birth: 16 July 1968 (age 58)
- Place of birth: Nottingham, England
- Height: 5 ft 11 in (1.80 m)
- Position: Goalkeeper

Senior career*
Years	Team	Apps	(Gls)
1986–1987	Stoke City	2	(0)
1987–1988	Kettering Town		
1988–1992	Grimsby Town	54	(0)
1992	Doncaster Rovers	1	(0)
1992–1994	Oxford United	39	(0)
1994–1995	Notts County	11	(0)
1995–1996	West Bromwich Albion	1	(0)
1995	→ Ilkeston Town (loan)		
1997–2003	Cliftonville		
2003	Ilkeston Town		
Total		108	(0)
- * Club domestic league appearances and goals

Paul John Reece (born 16 July 1968) is an English former professional footballer who played in the Football League for Doncaster Rovers, Grimsby Town, Notts County, Oxford United, Stoke City and West Bromwich Albion. He is a goalkeeping coach for Select Soccer Center in Pennsylvania.

== Career ==
Reece was born in Nottingham and started his footballing career at Staffordshire side Stoke City. He played just twice for Stoke both came towards the end of the 1986–87 where he deputised for the injured Peter Fox. He conceded six goals in his two matches 4–1 to Shrewsbury Town and 2–1 to Barnsley and was released at the end of the season. He joined Kettering Town for one season and won Player of the Year Award before signing for Grimsby Town for £10,000, where he played regular football. He left for Doncaster Rovers in 1992 and made just one appearance for Doncaster. He joined Oxford United and later played for Notts County, West Bromwich Albion, Ilkeston Town and Northern Irish club Cliftonville.

Reece arrived at Solitude on a free transfer after being recommended to the club by former player Keith Alexander, who had been his manager at Ilkeston and former teammate at Grimsby. He made his debut for the Belfast club in the final of the 1996–97 County Antrim Shield and he saved a penalty in the penalty shootout, ensuring Cliftonville won the trophy for the first time since 1979. He subsequently wore the number one shirt during the club's Irish League title winning season the following year and became established as a club legend in the eyes of the supporters. Reece would also appear for the Reds in the UEFA Champions League qualifier against MFK Košice the following season.

Reece subsequently returned to Ilkeston Town, remaining on the club's books until his retirement from playing in 2003. He worked as a goalkeeping coach for Nottingham Forest, Mansfield Town and the Derby County youth team before fulfilling the same role at football training camps.

== Career statistics ==
Appearances and goals by club, season and competition
Club	Season	League			FA Cup		League Cup		Other		Total	
Club	Season	Division	Apps	Goals	Apps	Goals	Apps	Goals	Apps	Goals	Apps	Goals
Stoke City	1986–87	Second Division	2	0	0	0	0	0	0	0	2	0
Grimsby Town	1988–89	Fourth Division	14	0	3	0	2	0	2 (Note: Appearances in Football League Trophy)	0	21	0
Grimsby Town	1989–90	Fourth Division	15	0	2	0	1	0	2	0	20	0
Grimsby Town	1990–91	Third Division	0	0	0	0	0	0	0	0	0	0
Grimsby Town	1991–92	Second Division	25	0	0	0	0	0	0	0	25	0
Grimsby Town	Total		54	0	5	0	3	0	4	0	56	0
Doncaster Rovers	1992–93	Third Division	1	0	0	0	0	0	0	0	1	0
Oxford United	1992–93	First Division	35	0	2	0	1	0	0	0	38	0
Oxford United	1993–94	First Division	4	0	0	0	2	0	1 (Note: Appearances in Anglo-Italian Cup)	0	7	0
Oxford United	Total		39	0	2	0	3	0	1	0	45	0
Notts County	1994–95	First Division	11	0	0	0	1	0	3	0	15	0
West Bromwich Albion	1995–96	First Division	1	0	0	0	0	0	0	0	1	0
Career total			108	0	7	0	7	0	8	0	130	0
