= Charlie Palmer (footballer) =

English footballer (born 1963)

Personal information
- Date of birth: 10 July 1963 (age 63)
- Place of birth: Aylesbury, England
- Height: 5 ft 11 in (1.80 m)
- Position: Defender

Youth career
- Watford

Senior career*
Years	Team	Apps	(Gls)
1981–1984	Watford	10	(1)
1984–1986	Derby County	51	(2)
1986–1989	Hull City	70	(1)
1989–1994	Notts County	182	(7)
1994–1996	Walsall	54	(2)
1996–1997	Burton Albion		
1998	Moor Green		
1998–2000	Hinckley United		
Total		367	(13)

Managerial career
- 2012–2013: Mickleover Sports
- 2013–2015: Long Eaton United
- 2015–2017: Belper Town
- * Club domestic league appearances and goals

Charlie Palmer (born 10 July 1963) is an English ex-professional footballer who played in the 1980s and 1990s for a variety of clubs in England at right-back and latterly centre-back.

== Playing career ==
Born in Aylesbury, Palmer started his football career as an apprentice at Watford, managed by Graham Taylor. He played 18 matches for Watford in all competitions between 1981 and 1984, including four in the UEFA Cup. In July 1984, Palmer moved to Derby County on a free transfer. Under the management of Arthur Cox, he was part of the team that won the Football League Second Division in the 1986–87 season. However, before the end of that season, Palmer moved to Hull City, for a transfer fee of £30,000. After a two-year stay in Hull, he moved to Notts County, under the management of Neil Warnock.

The next few years had journeys to Wembley Stadium to play in consecutive playoff finals, winning both. Then an Anglo-Italian Cup Final against Brescia, led by Gheorghe Hagi. During this time at Notts, Charlie Palmer is probably best remembered for the winning goal against city rivals Nottingham Forest in the local derby. Palmer moved on to Walsall in 1994, before moving on to non-League clubs Burton Albion, Moor Green and Hinckley United.

== Coaching career ==
Since finishing playing, Palmer has coached Hinckley United in the Conference North under the management of ex-Notts colleague Dean Thomas, and was later assistant manager at Mickleover Sports, where he was briefly caretaker manager during the 2012–13 season. On 14 April 2013 Palmer took over as manager of Northern Counties East Premier Division club Long Eaton United, replacing former Notts County player Mick Galloway who left the club in March 2013. He remained at Long Eaton until October 2015 when he took over as manager at Belper Town. He resigned as manager at the end of the 2016–17 season.

== Honours ==
Notts County

- Football League Second Division play-offs: 1991
- Football League Third Division play-offs: 1990

Walsall

- Football League Third Division runner-up: 1994–95
