= Dave Smith (footballer, born 1933) =

Scottish footballer and manager (1933–2022)

Personal information
- Full name: David Bowman Smith
- Date of birth: 22 September 1933
- Place of birth: Dundee, Scotland
- Date of death: 8 September 2022 (aged 88)
- Position: Full back

Senior career*
Years	Team	Apps	(Gls)
1950–1961	Burnley	99	(1)
1961–1962	Brighton & Hove Albion	15	(0)
1962	Bristol City	3	(0)
Total		117	(1)

Managerial career
- 1974–1976: Mansfield Town
- 1976–1983: Southend United
- 1984–1988: Plymouth Argyle
- 1988–1989: Dundee
- 1989–1991: Torquay United
- * Club domestic league appearances and goals

David Bowman Smith (22 September 1933 – 8 September 2022) was a Scottish football player and manager.

== Playing career ==
Smith was born in Dundee, Scotland on 22 September 1933. He started his career as a 16-year-old at First Division Burnley. After 11 years at Burnley, he had short spells at Brighton and Bristol City before retiring to take up coaching at Sheffield Wednesday. Further coaching stints followed at Newcastle United and Arsenal.

== Managerial career ==
Smith helped Newcastle United win the Fairs Cup in 1968–69 as a coach.

His first management job was at Fourth Division Mansfield Town in 1974 where re-election was just avoided. The following season was a triumph, Mansfield taking the title by six points without losing a game at home. The following season saw Mansfield struggle, and it looked as though they would make an immediate return to the Fourth Division, but a run of nineteen games unbeaten saw Mansfield comfortably survive in 11th place. However, Smith resigned shortly after the end of the season following a dispute with the club's directors.

His next job was at Southend United where in his second season promotion from the Fourth Division was achieved again, this time as runners up to Watford in 1978. Two seasons of struggle followed resulting in relegation. Again, promotion was achieved at the first attempt, this time as champions, with nine club records broken in the process. Third Division safety was then achieved and Smith's job was assured until a takeover left him out.

Sixteen months followed out of football selling insurance and applying for every vacant manager's position. Smith then took over at Third Division Plymouth Argyle in December 1984 from Johnny Hore and fifteenth position was achieved in his first part-season. The following year promotion was achieved to the Second Division as runners up to Reading. In 1987 Smith took Plymouth to 7th position in the second tier of English football, narrowly missing out on the end of season play-offs. This was one of the club's highest ever finishing positions and was achieved on a modest playing budget.

Smith's legendary status amongst Argyle fans was helped by his colourful personality, which included using poetry to describe his team's performance and wearing his tartan cap for good luck.

The summer of 1988 resulted in another move, back to Scotland and his home town club Dundee. His spell at Dundee was not to be a happy one, however, and he was sacked after only six months, with the club deep in relegation trouble.

In 1989, Smith returned to the West Country enjoying a successful spell as manager of Torquay United before resigning on 2 April 1991 and retiring from management. Smith was reportedly approached by Plymouth Argyle in 1997 to return to the club as manager, but could not be tempted out of retirement.

However, he remained involved in football and ran highly popular soccer schools in the Plymouth area. Smith is featured on one of the many murals within Plymouth Argyle's Home Park stadium, reflecting his status as one of the club's most popular and successful managers.

== Personal life ==
Smith died on 8 September 2022, at the age of 88.

== Honours ==
=== As a manager ===
Mansfield Town

- Football League Fourth Division: 1974–75

Southend United

- Football League Fourth Division: 1980–81; promotion: 1977–78

Plymouth Argyle

- Football League Third Division promotion: 1985–86

Dundee

- Forfarshire Cup: 1988–89
