= Dave Regis =

English footballer

Personal information
- Date of birth: 3 March 1964 (age 62)
- Place of birth: Paddington, England
- Position: Striker

Senior career*
Years	Team	Apps	(Gls)
- Dunstable Town
- Fisher Athletic
- Windsor & Eton
1990	Barnet		
1990–1991	Notts County	46	(15)
1991–1992	Plymouth Argyle	31	(4)
1992	→ Bournemouth (loan)	6	(2)
1992–1994	Stoke City	63	(15)
1994	Birmingham City	6	(2)
1994–1996	Southend United	38	(9)
1996–1997	Barnsley	16	(1)
1996	→ Peterborough United (loan)	7	(1)
1997	→ Notts County (loan)	10	(2)
1997	→ Scunthorpe United (loan)	5	(0)
1997	Leyton Orient	4	(0)
1997	Lincoln City	1	(0)
1998	Scunthorpe United	4	(2)
1998	Wivenhoe Town		
1999–2001	Hucknall Town		
Total		237	(53)
- * Club domestic league appearances and goals

David Regis (born 3 March 1964) is an English retired professional footballer who played as a striker. He scored 53 goals from 237 appearances in the Football League in the 1990s, notably for Stoke City and Notts County.

== Playing career ==
Regis was born in Paddington, London. He began his playing career in non-league football with clubs including Dunstable Town, Fisher Athletic, Windsor & Eton and Barnet. Barnet sold him for a fee of £25,000 to Notts County, where he began his professional career at the age of 26.

He also played professionally for Plymouth Argyle, Bournemouth, Stoke City (two seasons), Birmingham City, Southend United, Barnsley (where he was a member of the squad promoted to the Premier League, making four appearances that season), Peterborough United, Leyton Orient, Lincoln City and Scunthorpe United, where he finished his professional career in 1998, having made 231 league appearances. He later returned to non-league football with Wivenhoe Town in Essex and Hucknall Town.

== Post-playing career ==
Regis has been a football consultant and youth coach at Notts County's and Nottingham Forest's academies, education and welfare officer at Charlton Athletic's academy, and a regional manager in the Football League's youth development department.

== Personal life ==
Regis is the younger brother of footballer Cyrille Regis, the cousin of sprinter John Regis, and the uncle of footballer Jason Roberts.

== Career statistics ==
Appearances and goals by club, season and competition
Club	Season	League			FA Cup		League Cup		Other^{[A]}		Total	
Club	Season	Division	Apps	Goals	Apps	Goals	Apps	Goals	Apps	Goals	Apps	Goals
Notts County	1990–91	Second Division	37	15	0	0	1	0	5	2	43	17
Notts County	1991–92	First Division	9	0	0	0	1	0	1	0	11	0
Plymouth Argyle	1991–92	Second Division	24	2	1	0	0	0	0	0	25	2
Plymouth Argyle	1992–93	Second Division	7	2	0	0	2	3	0	0	9	5
Bournemouth (loan)	1992–93	Second Division	6	2	0	0	0	0	0	0	6	2
Stoke City	1992–93	Second Division	25	5	1	0	0	0	4	1	30	6
Stoke City	1993–94	First Division	38	10	4	2	2	1	4	1	48	14
Birmingham City	1994–95	Second Division	6	2	0	0	1	0	0	0	7	2
Southend United	1994–95	First Division	9	1	0	0	0	0	0	0	9	1
Southend United	1995–96	First Division	29	8	1	0	1	0	3	1	34	9
Barnsley	1995–96	First Division	12	1	0	0	0	0	0	0	12	1
Barnsley	1996–97	First Division	4	0	0	0	3	0	0	0	7	0
Peterborough United (loan)	1996–97	Second Division	7	1	0	0	0	0	0	0	7	1
Notts County (loan)	1996–97	Second Division	10	2	0	0	0	0	0	0	10	2
Scunthorpe United (loan)	1997–98	Third Division	5	0	0	0	0	0	0	0	5	0
Leyton Orient	1997–98	Third Division	4	0	0	0	0	0	0	0	4	0
Lincoln City	1997–98	Third Division	1	0	0	0	0	0	0	0	1	0
Scunthorpe United	1997–98	Third Division	4	2	0	0	0	0	0	0	4	2
Career total			237	53	7	2	11	4	17	5	272	64

A. The "Other" column includes appearances and goals in the Anglo-Italian Cup, Football League play-offs, Football League Trophy and Full Members Cup.

== Honours ==
Notts County

- Football League Second Division play-offs: 1991

Stoke City

- Football League Second Division: 1992–93
