= Mark Draper =

English footballer (born 1970)

Personal information
- Full name: Mark Andrew Draper
- Date of birth: 11 November 1970 (age 55)
- Place of birth: Long Eaton, England
- Height: 5 ft 10 in (1.78 m)
- Position: Midfielder

Senior career*
Years	Team	Apps	(Gls)
1988–1994	Notts County	222	(41)
1994–1995	Leicester City	39	(5)
1995–2000	Aston Villa	120	(7)
2000	→ Rayo Vallecano (loan)	4	(0)
2000–2003	Southampton	24	(1)
2009	Dunkirk		
Total		409	(54)

International career
1991	England U21	3	(0)
- * Club domestic league appearances and goals

Mark Andrew Draper (born 11 November 1970) is an English football coach and former professional footballer.

As a player, he was a midfielder from 1988 to 2003, notably in the Premier League for Leicester City, Aston Villa and Southampton. He also played in Spain for Rayo Vallecano and in the Football League with Notts County. He represented England at under-21 level. In 2009, he briefly came out of retirement for non-league side Dunkirk.

Since retiring Draper had a spell as kit man for former side Notts County but has since moved into coaching and runs a football training centre for children in Nottingham.

== Playing career ==
Draper began his career as a product of the youth system at Notts County, making his professional debut in December 1988. A talented midfielder, he became recognised by County supporters as one of the most gifted young players ever developed at the club. After attracting the attention of a number of bigger clubs, Draper was finally sold during the 1994 close season to Leicester City for £1.25 million – a record fee for the club at the time.

Draper spent the entire 1994–95 season at Filbert Street, playing 39 times in the Premier League (to which they had just been promoted) and scoring five goals, although it was not enough to prevent relegation for a side who were never out of the bottom two after November. Despite this he was called up to the England squad by Terry Venables.

His form attracted the attention of Aston Villa, who paid £3.25 million to keep him in the Premier League. Over the next four seasons Draper became a regular in the Aston Villa starting line-up, helping them to a League Cup win in 1996. He received another call up to the England squad, this time by Glenn Hoddle for a World Cup qualifier against Moldova. However, he stayed on the bench and was ultimately never capped for the senior team.

Draper fell out of favour in the 1999–2000 season, appearing in only one game to bring his Villa total up to 120 league appearances (7 goals), and was loaned to Rayo Vallecano in Spain. He was sold during that close season to Southampton for £1.5 million. By then approaching veteran stage, Draper added another 24 top flight appearances (with one goal against Middlesbrough) for the Saints before leaving the game.

== Later career in non-league football ==
Draper made a brief playing comeback in 2009, signing for non-league side Dunkirk.

Draper was enticed back into the local non league game by Paul Rawden who took Draper to East Midlands Counties Football League side Radford as coach and the pair saved the club from relegation, Draper then followed Rawden to Arnold Town for the 2012–13 season for a brief spell before they both left the club.

== Personal life ==
He is involved in property development. In 2009, he rejoined his old club Notts County as their kit man.

He works with ex-Aston Villa footballer Dave Norton at their soccer school "Draper Norton Football", based in Nottingham.

== Career statistics ==
Appearances and goals by club, season and competition
Club	Season	League			FA Cup		League Cup		Other		Total	
Club	Season	Division	Apps	Goals	Apps	Goals	Apps	Goals	Apps	Goals	Apps	Goals
Notts County
Notts County	1988–89	Third Division	20	3	0	0	1	0	3 (Note: Appearances in Associate Members' Cup)	0	24	3
Notts County	1989–90	Third Division	34	3	1	0	2	0	3	1	40	4
Notts County	1990–91	Second Division	45	9	4	0	4	0	5 (Note: Appearances in Full Members' Cup (2 appearances, 1 goal) and play-offs (3 appearances))	1	58	10
Notts County	1991–92	First Division	35	1	2	1	1	0	2 (Note: Appearances in Full Members' Cup)	1	40	3
Notts County	1992–93	First Division	44	11	0	0	3	1	2 (Note: Appearances in Anglo-Italian Cup)	0	49	12
Notts County	1993–94	First Division	44	14	3	1	4	1	8	2	59	18
Notts County	Total		222	41	10	2	15	2	23	5	270	50
Leicester City	1994–95	Premier League	39	5	2	0	2	0	—		43	5
Aston Villa
Aston Villa	1995–96	Premier League	36	2	5	2	8	1	—		49	5
Aston Villa	1996–97	Premier League	29	0	0	0	2	0	2 (Note: Appearances in UEFA Cup)	0	33	0
Aston Villa	1997–98	Premier League	31	3	4	0	1	0	7	0	43	3
Aston Villa	1998–99	Premier League	23	2	1	0	1	1	4	0	29	3
Aston Villa	1999–2000	Premier League	1	0	0	0	0	0	—		1	0
Aston Villa	Total		120	7	10	2	12	2	13	0	155	11
Rayo Vallecano (loan)	1999–2000	La Liga	4	0	0	0	0	0	—		4	0
Southampton
Southampton	2000–01	Premier League	22	1	4	0	1	0	—		27	1
Southampton	2001–02	Premier League	2	0	0	0	1	0	—		3	0
Southampton	Total		24	1	4	0	2	0	0	0	30	1
Career total			409	54	26	4	31	4	36	5	502	67

== Honours ==
Notts County

- Football League Second Division play-offs: 1991

Aston Villa

- Football League Cup: 1995–96

Individual

- PFA Team of the Year: 1993–94 First Division
