= Paul Cox (footballer) =

English football manager and former player (born 1972)

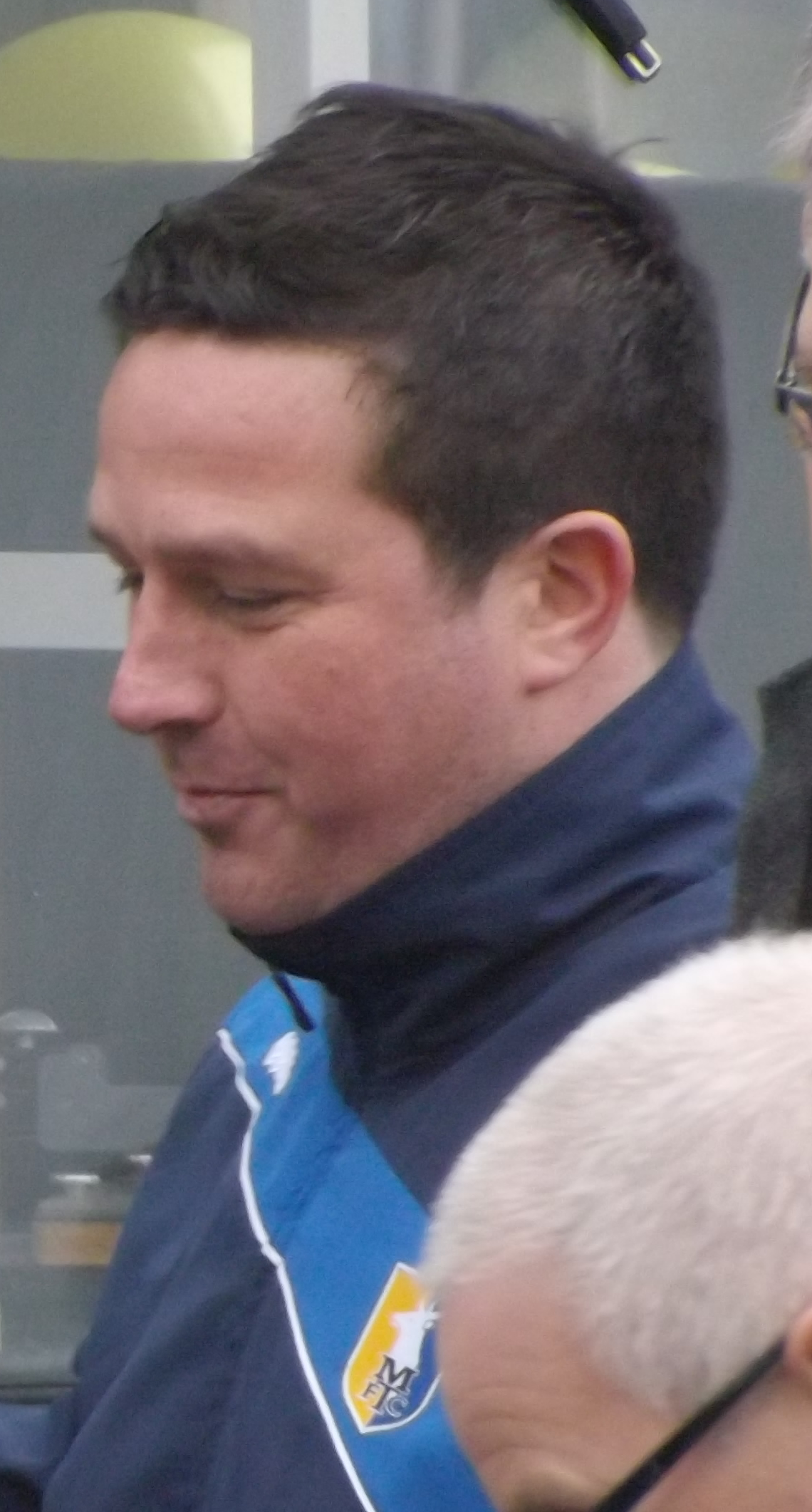
- Cox as manager of Mansfield Town in 2013

Personal information
- Full name: Paul Richard Cox
- Date of birth: 6 January 1972 (age 54)
- Place of birth: Nottingham, England
- Position: Defender

Youth career
- 1989–1991: Notts County

Senior career*
Years	Team	Apps	(Gls)
1991–1995	Notts County	43	(1)
1994	→ Hull City (loan)	5	(1)
1995–1996	Kettering Town	8	(0)
1996–1997	Halifax Town	23	(0)
1997–2001	Kettering Town	92	(0)
2001–2002	Hucknall Town		

Managerial career
- 2005–2011: Eastwood Town
- 2011–2014: Mansfield Town
- 2015: Torquay United
- 2015–2017: Barrow
- 2017–2018: Guiseley
- 2019–2022: Kettering Town
- 2022: Boston United
- * Club domestic league appearances and goals

Paul Richard Cox (born 6 January 1972) is an English football manager who was previously a professional footballer. Cox was most recently manager of National League North club Boston United.

In an eleven-year career as a player, Cox played in the Football League with his hometown club Notts County before playing in non-league football with several clubs, most notably Kettering Town. Cox moved into coaching at Eastwood Town in 2003, becoming the manager in 2005. He won the Northern Premier League in 2008–09, and left the club for Mansfield Town in 2011, with whom he won the Conference Premier in 2012–13, before leaving in November 2014. He later managed Torquay United in 2015, Barrow from 2015 until 2017, and Guiseley between 2017 and 2018 when he was appointed manager of Kettering Town.

== Playing career ==
Cox was born in Nottingham, Nottinghamshire. As a player, he was a defender who could play as right-back or as a central defender. He began his career at his hometown club Notts County, making his first-team debut against Manchester City on 25 April 1992, coming on as a substitute for Kevin Bartlett. Cox spent five years at Notts County, playing just over 40 matches, and also had a short loan spell with Hull City.

At the end of the 1994–95 season, Cox was released by Notts County, and he subsequently dropped down into non-league football, where he most notably spent five seasons with Kettering Town, and also had spells at Halifax Town and Hucknall Town.

== Coaching and management career ==
=== Eastwood Town ===
In 2003, Cox began his coaching career when he became assistant manager at Eastwood Town of the Northern Premier League. In October 2006, Cox became manager of the club, and steered the club away from the Northern Premier League Division One relegation zone in his first season. The next season, he guided the Badgers to the first of two consecutive promotions, and in 2008–09 he also guided the club to the third round proper of the FA Cup for the first time in the club's history, where they lost to his former team Kettering.

In 2009–10, Cox led Eastwood to an 11th-place finish in their debut season in the Conference North, and in 2010–11, sparked by a 19-match unbeaten run, Eastwood finished in 4th place. However, the club was not allowed to compete in the promotion play-offs because their Coronation Park ground did not have the proper grade to be eligible for promotion to the Conference Premier. On 5 May 2011, Cox resigned as manager of Eastwood Town.

=== Mansfield Town ===
On 19 May 2011, Cox was appointed as the manager of Mansfield Town in the Conference Premier on a one-year contract. Cox led Mansfield to their highest Conference finish in his first season, finishing third, but eventually losing in the playoffs to York City. The next season he guided Mansfield to promotion to the Football League. Mansfield won 20 of the last 24 games to be crowned champions, this included a club record of 12 consecutive wins. This season Mansfield also reached the 3rd round proper of The FA Cup, losing eventually to a controversial Luis Suarez goal which gave Liverpool a 2–1 win. On 12 April 2012, Cox confirmed a new contract with Mansfield chairman John Radford to keep him at the club for another two seasons.

After Mansfield beat Barrow 8–1 in February 2013, thus improving on their 7–0 win in the reverse fixture, the club's chairman gave Cox his Aston Martin car as a reward.

On 21 November 2014, Cox left Mansfield by mutual consent. Cox left Mansfield the second highest win ratio in the club's history. A win ratio of 44.57%, a ratio only bettered by Dave Smith.

=== Torquay United ===
On 17 June 2015, Cox was appointed as the new manager of National League club Torquay United. He resigned after only three months in charge, later revealing that the club had been unable to pay him.

=== Barrow ===
On 23 November 2015, Cox was appointed as the manager of National League club Barrow. Cox guided Barrow away from the Conference National relegation zone finishing a respectable 11th place in his first season in charge. The next season Barrow just missed out on the playoffs after finishing 7th, whilst also reaching the 3rd round proper of The FA Cup. He resigned as Barrow manager on 24 August 2017, ending a 22-month spell at the club.

=== Guiseley ===
Eleven days after leaving Barrow, Cox was appointed manager of fellow National League club Guiseley. He was sacked by the club in February 2018, managing only 4 wins in 29 games for the Yorkshire side.

=== Kettering Town ===
On 24 October 2019 Cox was appointed as the manager of National League North club Kettering Town, where he had previously made 125 appearances during his senior career between 1997 and 2001.

On 21 January 2022, Cox resigned from his position with his club sitting eight in the league.

=== Boston United ===
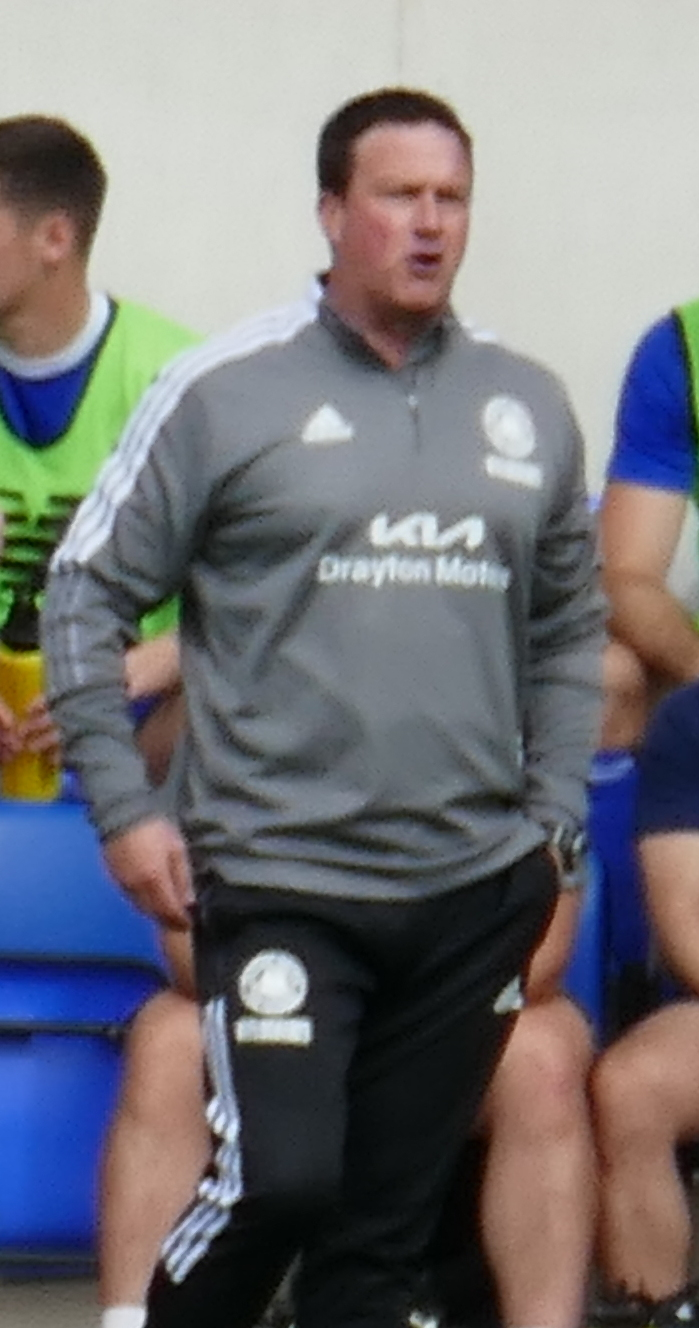
Cox as manager of Boston United in 2022

On 21 January 2022, Cox was appointed manager of National League North side Boston United. Having been defeated in the 2022 play-off final, Cox was sacked by the club on 6 September 2022 after only three points from his side's first seven matches left them in 24th position.

== Managerial statistics ==
As of match played 1 February 2020

Managerial record by team and tenure
Team	From	To	Record					Ref.
Team	From	To	P	W	D	L	Win %	Ref.
Mansfield Town	19 May 2011	21 November 2014	176	78	46	52	44.3	
Torquay United	17 June 2015	18 September 2015	10	2	4	4	20.0	
Barrow	23 November 2015	24 August 2017	86	37	30	19	43.0	
Guiseley	4 September 2017	14 February 2018	29	4	10	15	13.8	
Kettering Town	24 October 2019	21 January 2022	64	22	22	20	34.4	
Total			364	143	111	110	39.3	—

== Honours ==
Eastwood Town

- Northern Premier League Challenge Cup: 2007–08
- Northern Premier League Premier Division: 2008–09
- Nottinghamshire Senior Cup: 2005–06, 2006–07, 2007–08, 2009–10, 2010–11

Mansfield Town

- Conference Premier: 2012–13
