= Chris Short (footballer) =

Footballer (born 1970)

Personal information
- Full name: Christian Mark Short
- Date of birth: 9 May 1970 (age 56)
- Place of birth: Münster, West Germany
- Position: Defender

Youth career
- Pickering Town

Senior career*
Years	Team	Apps	(Gls)
1988–1990	Scarborough	43	(1)
1990	→ Manchester United (loan)	0	(0)
1990–1995	Notts County	94	(2)
1994	→ Huddersfield Town (loan)	6	(0)
1995–1998	Sheffield United	46	(0)
1998–2000	Stoke City	35	(0)
2001	Scarborough	5	(0)
2001	Hinckley United	2	(0)
Total		231	(3)
- * Club domestic league appearances and goals

Christian Mark Short (born 9 May 1970) is a former footballer who played as a defender for Scarborough, Notts County, Huddersfield Town, Sheffield United and Stoke City. He also played non-league football for Pickering Town and Hinckley United.

== Playing career ==
Born in Münster, West Germany, Short grew up in Yorkshire and followed his older brother Craig from non-league Pickering Town on to Scarborough. He was loaned to Manchester United before joining his brother again at Notts County for £240,000, Scarborough's record sale. He helped Neil Warnock's side reach the top flight in his first season and he stayed there until 1995, when he joined Sheffield United. Brian Little took him to Stoke City on a free transfer in 1998 and impressed as an attacking right back.

However, just a month into his Stoke career he collapsed on the edge of the pitch at Fulham on 8 September 1998 and had to be revived with oxygen. Short went on a number of checks at the hospital but they found no problems with him. He was put on a sodium diet and says that he always felt "tired and out of breath". Eventually he was diagnosed with a circulation disorder and retired from playing after ending his career with Scarborough and Hinckley United.

== Coaching career ==
Short later worked as a strength and conditioning coach and sports massage therapist and has also worked as a fitness coach with Blackburn Rovers, Crystal Palace, Derby County, Leicester City and Sheffield United. Short joined Neil Warnock's coaching set-up at Leeds United as the first team fitness conditioner on 13 July 2012. Short left the club shortly after the sacking of Neil Warnock, with manager Brian McDermott bringing in his own fitness coach Jon Goodman.

In November 2016 he became the fitness coach at Bradford City. He left his role with Bradford in June 2018.

A month after leaving Bradford he moved to Blackpool as the new First Team Coach.

He joined Oxford United in 2018, as the club's new Head of Sports Science. Short left this role at the end of the 2020/21 season to join Middlesbrough, but departed following Neil Warnock's sacking the following November.

He returned to Oxford United for a second spell in the club's sports science department in September 2022 on a short-term basis, initially until Christmas, helping out with the first team and women's side.

== Personal life ==
His brother Craig was also a professional footballer. He and his brother now regularly row across the English channel for charity. Both have played for Pickering Town, Scarborough, Notts County and Sheffield United. The two have also worked together at Oxford United.

== Career statistics ==
Appearances and goals by club, season and competition
Club	Season	League			FA Cup		League Cup		Other (Note: Includes Anglo-Italian Cup, Football League play-offs, Football League Trophy.)		Total	
Club	Season	Division	Apps	Goals	Apps	Goals	Apps	Goals	Apps	Goals	Apps	Goals
Scarborough	1988–89	Fourth Division	2	0	0	0	0	0	2	0	4	0
Scarborough	1989–90	Fourth Division	41	1	1	0	5	0	2	0	49	1
Scarborough	Total		43	1	1	0	5	0	4	0	53	1
Notts County	1990–91	Second Division	15	1	2	0	0	0	2	0	19	1
Notts County	1991–92	First Division	27	0	2	0	1	0	2	1	32	1
Notts County	1992–93	First Division	31	1	1	0	2	0	1	0	35	1
Notts County	1993–94	First Division	6	0	0	0	2	0	1	0	9	0
Notts County	1994–95	First Division	13	0	0	0	0	0	1	0	14	0
Notts County	1995–96	Second Division	2	0	0	0	2	0	2	0	6	0
Notts County	Total		94	2	5	0	7	0	9	1	115	3
Huddersfield Town (loan)	1994–95	Second Division	6	0	0	0	0	0	1	0	7	0
Sheffield United	1995–96	First Division	15	0	3	0	0	0	0	0	18	0
Sheffield United	1996–97	First Division	24	0	0	0	3	0	2	0	29	0
Sheffield United	1997–98	First Division	5	0	4	0	1	0	0	0	10	0
Sheffield United	Total		44	0	7	0	4	0	2	0	57	0
Stoke City	1998–99	Second Division	21	0	0	0	2	0	0	0	23	0
Stoke City	1999–2000	Second Division	14	0	1	0	3	0	0	0	18	0
Stoke City	Total		35	0	1	0	5	0	0	0	41	0
Scarborough	2001–02	Football Conference	5	0	0	0	0	0	0	0	5	0
Career total			227	3	14	0	21	0	16	1	278	4
