= Dean Thomas (footballer) =

Welsh footballer and manager

Personal information
- Date of birth: 19 December 1961 (age 64)
- Place of birth: Bedworth, Warwickshire, England
- Height: 5 ft 9 in (1.75 m)
- Position: Midfielder

Youth career
- –1981: Nuneaton Borough

Senior career*
Years	Team	Apps	(Gls)
1981–1983	Wimbledon	57	(8)
1982–1983	→ Ilves (loan)	35	(9)
1983–1988	Fortuna Düsseldorf	81	(9)
1988–1990	Northampton Town	74	(12)
1990–1994	Notts County	134	(8)
1994–1997	Bedworth United		
1997–2005	Hinckley United	64	(7)

Managerial career
- 1994–1997: Bedworth United
- 1997–2012: Hinckley United
- 2013–2014: Kettering Town
- 2017: Hinckley AFC
- * Club domestic league appearances and goals

Dean Thomas (born 19 December 1961) is an English former football player and manager. Thomas played for Fortuna Düsseldorf and Notts County. Thomas also managed Hinckley United throughout almost the entirety of their fifteen-year history and then went on to manage Kettering Town.

== Playing career ==
Thomas was a professional footballer with Wimbledon, Tampereen Ilves, Alemannia Aachen, Fortuna Düsseldorf, Northampton Town and Notts County. During his second loan spell with Ilves, Thomas won the Finnish championship in 1983. While at Notts County, he was club captain and played twice at Wembley Stadium.

== Managerial career ==
His first managerial post was with Bedworth United, his hometown club. In 1997, he became the first manager of newly formed Hinckley United. He led the club to the Southern Football League Western Division championship in the 2000–01 season and the FA Cup second round in December 2001 and December 2004.

Thomas resigned as manager on 10 October 2012. In his 15 years with the club, he managed the club in 972 games.

Thomas took over as manager of Kettering Town of the Southern League Division One Central at the beginning of the 2013–14 season. He lost most of his first games, but eventually pulled together results, going 21 games unbeaten. The Poppies finished in 3rd place, thus qualifying for the play-offs. They beat Daventry Town 1–0 in the semi-final and progressed to the play-off final against Slough Town. Kettering took a two-goal lead in the final but ultimately lost 3–2.

In May 2014, Thomas announced that he was stepping down as Kettering Town FC manager.

== Personal life ==
Since retiring from the football pitch, Thomas now sings covers of swing songs at local entertainment venues.

== Honours ==
Wimbledon

- Football League Fourth Division: 1982–83

Notts County

- Football League Second Division play-offs: 1991
- Football League Third Division play-offs: 1990
