= Dean Yates =

English footballer (born 1967)

Personal information
- Date of birth: 26 October 1967 (age 59)
- Place of birth: Leicester, England
- Height: 6 ft 1 in (1.85 m)
- Position: Defender

Senior career*
Years	Team	Apps	(Gls)
1985–1995	Notts County	314	(33)
1995–1998	Derby County	74	(3)
1998–2000	Watford	10	(1)
Total		398	(37)
- * Club domestic league appearances and goals

Dean Yates (born 26 October 1967) is an English retired footballer who played as a defender.

== Club career ==
He achieved early success as a first-team player and made his Notts County debut during the 1984–85 Second Division season, which concluded with the club’s relegation. He was a regular first team player from 1985–86 onwards, helping them win promotion back to the Second Division in 1990 and to the First Division a year later (both through the playoffs). However, a serious knee injury in February 1992 ruled him out for the next two years and meant that County were without him when they needed him most — during the final quarter of the 1991–92 season when they battled against relegation from the First Division. The relegation battle was lost, and he managed just one appearance in the 1993–94 season as he made his comeback from injury.

He was fully fit for the 1994–95 season, but his presence in the team wasn't enough to prevent a relegation battle which was ultimately lost.

By the time County went down from Division One (as the old Second Division became known following the creation of the FA Premier League for the 1992–93 season), Yates had transferred to their local rivals Derby County - a £350,000 fee taking him to the Baseball Ground on 26 January 1995. He had played 314 league games in 10 years for Notts County.

The Rams had been favourites for promotion every season since their relegation from the top flight in 1991, but the closest they had come to achieving Premier League status was playoff defeats in 1992 and 1994, and when Yates arrived the playoffs were looking beyond their reach. They could only manage a ninth-place finish in 1994–95, but they achieved automatic promotion the following season as Yates's contributed 38 league appearances and two goals. However, the arrival of Igor Stimac restricted Yates to just 10 appearances in 1996–97 and nine the following season as Derby established themselves as a consistent mid table Premier League side.

He left to join Watford, which had been newly promoted to Division One after winning the Division Two title, on 16 July 1998 on a free transfer. However, injury problems restricted his first team opportunities at Vicarage Road and he played just 10 games (9 league, 1 Worthington Cup), scoring just the once in a 4-1 away win against Bristol City, in the 1998–99 season. Watford won a second successive promotion via the playoffs and reached the Premier League, but Yates did not feature in the 1999–2000 campaign as Watford were relegated. After the end of the season, he retired from playing.

== Honours ==
Notts County

- Football League Second Division play-offs: 1991
- Football League Third Division play-offs: 1990

Individual

- PFA Team of the Year: 1987–88 Third Division, 1988–89 Third Division, 1989–90 Third Division
