= Richard Walker (footballer, born 1971) =

English footballer

Personal information
- Full name: Richard Neill Walker
- Date of birth: 9 November 1971 (age 54)
- Place of birth: Derby, England
- Position: Centre back

Senior career*
| Years | Team | Apps | (Gls) |
| 1990–1997 | Notts County | 67 | (4) |
| 1995 | → Mansfield Town (loan) | 4 | (0) |
| 1997–1998 | Hereford United | 46 | (3) |
| 1998–2003 | Cheltenham Town | 70 | (1) |
| Total | | 197 | (8) |
- * Club domestic league appearances and goals

Richard Neill Walker (born 9 November 1971) is an English former footballer.

== Honours ==
Cheltenham Town

- Football League Third Division play-offs: 2002
