= Rob Matthews (footballer) =

English footballer

Personal information
- Full name: Robert David Matthews
- Date of birth: 14 October 1970 (age 56)
- Place of birth: Slough, England
- Position: Striker

Youth career
- Loughborough University

Senior career*
Years	Team	Apps	(Gls)
1992–1995	Notts County	43	(11)
1995	Luton Town	11	(0)
1995–1996	York City	17	(1)
1996–1998	Bury	74	(11)
1998–2001	Stockport County	38	(4)
1999–2000	Blackpool	6	(2)
2001	Halifax Town	8	(2)
2001–2002	Hull City	23	(3)
2002	Northwich Victoria	6	(0)
2002–2004	Mossley	?	(?)
- * Club domestic league appearances and goals

Robert David Matthews (born 14 October 1970) is an English former footballer who played as a striker.

== Honours ==
Bury

- Football League Second Division: 1996–97
