= Steve Slawson =

English footballer

Personal information
- Full name: Stephen Michael Slawson
- Date of birth: 13 November 1972 (age 53)
- Place of birth: Nottingham, England
- Height: 6 ft 0 in (1.83 m)
- Position: Striker

Senior career*
| Years | Team | Apps | (Gls) |
| 1991–1995 | Notts County | 38 | (4) |
| 1993 | → Burnley (loan) | 5 | (2) |
| 1994 | → Shrewsbury Town (loan) | 6 | (0) |
| 1995–1996 | Mansfield Town | 29 | (5) |
| 1996–1997 | Rotherham United | 5 | (0) |
| Total | | 83 | (11) |
- * Club domestic league appearances and goals

Stephen Michael "Steve" Slawson (born 13 November 1972) is a former English professional footballer who played as a striker.
