= Gary Lund =

English footballer (born 1964)

Personal information
- Full name: Gary James Lund
- Date of birth: 13 September 1964 (age 62)
- Place of birth: Cleethorpes, England
- Height: 6 ft 0 in (1.83 m)
- Position: Forward

Senior career*
Years	Team	Apps	(Gls)
1983–1986	Grimsby Town	60	(24)
1986–1987	Lincoln City	44	(13)
1987–1995	Notts County	248	(62)
1992	→ Hull City (loan)	11	(3)
1995	→ Hull City (loan)	11	(3)
1995–1997	Chesterfield	18	(1)
Total		392	(106)

International career
1984–1985	England U21	3	(0)
- * Club domestic league appearances and goals

Gary James Lund (born 13 September 1964) is an English former professional footballer who scored 106 goals from 392 appearances in the Football League playing as a centre forward for Grimsby Town, Lincoln City, Notts County, Hull City and Chesterfield. He was capped by England at under-21 level.

== Honours ==
Notts County

- Football League Third Division play-offs: 1990
