= Mick Walker (footballer, born 1940) =

English football manager (1940–2025)

Personal information
- Full name: Michael Walker
- Date of birth: 27 November 1940
- Place of birth: Belper, Derbyshire, England
- Date of death: 7 February 2025 (aged 84)
- Place of death: Leeds, West Yorkshire, England

Senior career*
Years	Team	Apps	(Gls)
	Nottingham Forest	0	(0)
- Kettering Town
- Matlock Town

Managerial career
- 1971–1972: Ilkeston Town
- 1972–1974: Singapore
- 1976–1978: Burton Albion
- 1993–1994: Notts County
- * Club domestic league appearances and goals

Michael Walker (27 November 1940 – 7 February 2025) was an English football player and manager. As a player, he started his career as an apprentice with Nottingham Forest and played non-league football for several clubs, including Kettering Town and Matlock Town. He later became manager of the reserve team at Ilkeston Town before being appointed first-team manager in 1971 following the departure of Dave Agnew. Six months later, Walker was hired as manager of the Singapore national team. He joined Burton Albion as manager in 1976 and spent two years in charge of the club, later joining the coaching staff at Notts County.

== Career ==
Walker had a spell as manager of Notts County, succeeding Neil Warnock in January 1993 to September 1994. He later worked on the staff of Leeds United, where he was the chief scout as of 2010.

== Personal life and death ==
Walker was born in Belper, Derbyshire, England on 27 November 1940. He died on 7 February 2025, at the age of 84, and was survived by his wife, Hilary, and his three children. Walker lived in Wetherby, Leeds, West Yorkshire.
