= Phil Turner (footballer, born 1962) =

English footballer

Personal information
- Full name: Philip Turner
- Date of birth: 12 February 1962 (age 64)
- Place of birth: Sheffield, England
- Height: 5 ft 8 in (1.73 m)
- Position: Midfielder

Senior career*
Years	Team	Apps	(Gls)
1979–1986	Lincoln City	241	(19)
1986–1988	Grimsby Town	62	(9)
1988–1989	Leicester City	24	(2)
1989–1996	Notts County	237	(16)
2004	Grantham Town	1	(0)
- * Club domestic league appearances and goals

Philip Turner (born 12 February 1962) is an English retired footballer.

== Career ==
Turner, a central midfielder, began his career at Lincoln City with whom he won promotion to the Third Division in 1981 under Colin Murphy, and formed midfield partnerships with Glenn Cockerill and then Neil Redfearn before joining Grimsby Town in 1986. In May 1985 he was to witness a nightmare when 56 spectators were killed in a horrendous stand fire while playing Bradford City. A brief spell at Leicester City followed before he joined Notts County in 1989. He would become a stalwart of the Magpies side, winning back-to-back promotions in 1990 and 1991, and remained at the club until his professional retirement in 1996. Turner made one final appearance as a substitute for Grantham Town on the opening day of the 2004/05 season.

== Honours ==
Lincoln City

- Football League Group Cup runner-up: 1982–83

Notts County

- Football League Second Division play-offs: 1991
- Football League Third Division play-offs: 1990
