= 1994–95 Mansfield Town F.C. season =

Mansfield Town
1994–95 season
- Manager: Andy King
- Stadium: Field Mill
- Third Division: 6th
- FA Cup: Third Round
- League Cup: Third Round
- Football League Trophy: First Round

The 1994–95 season was Mansfield Town's 58th season in the Football League and 22nd in the Third Division they finished in 6th position with 65 points and lost to local rivals Chesterfield in the play-offs.

== Final league table ==
Pos	Team	Pld	W	D	L	GF	GA	GD	Pts	Promotion or relegation
4	Bury	42	23	11	8	73	36	+37	80	Qualification for the Third Division play-offs
5	Preston North End	42	19	10	13	58	41	+17	67	Qualification for the Third Division play-offs
6	Mansfield Town	42	18	11	13	84	59	+25	65	Qualification for the Third Division play-offs
7	Scunthorpe United	42	18	8	16	68	63	+5	62	
8	Fulham	42	16	14	12	60	54	+6	62	

== Results ==
=== Football League Third Division ===
Match	Date	Opponent	Venue	Result	Attendance	Scorers
1	20 August 1994	Colchester United	H	2–0	2,247	Hadley, Holland
2	27 August 1994	Chesterfield	A	1–0	4,210	Hadley
3	30 August 1994	Darlington	H	0–1	2,427	
4	3 September 1994	Bury	H	0–2	2,578	
5	10 September 1994	Lincoln City	A	2–3	2,575	Wilkinson, Noteman
6	13 September 1994	Carlisle United	A	1–2	6,136	Hadley
7	17 September 1994	Northampton Town	H	1–1	2,557	Holland
8	24 September 1994	Exeter City	H	1–1	2,486	Howarth
9	1 October 1994	Gillingham	A	2–0	2,569	Holland, Wilkinson
10	8 October 1994	Hartlepool United	H	2–0	2,545	Holland, Wilkinson
11	11 October 1994	Northampton Town	A	1–0	4,993	Wilkinson
12	15 October 1994	Torquay United	A	1–2	2,800	Peters
13	22 October 1994	Doncaster Rovers	H	0–1	2,988	
14	29 October 1994	Rochdale	A	3–3	1,968	Hadley, Noteman, Wilkinson
15	5 November 1994	Preston North End	H	1–2	2,602	Hadley
16	19 November 1994	Scunthorpe United	A	4–3	2,975	Holland, Hadley, Noteman, Peters
17	26 November 1994	Walsall	H	1–3	2,733	Wilkinson
18	10 December 1994	Colchester United	A	1–1	3,016	Wilkinson
19	18 December 1994	Chesterfield	H	4–2	3,519	Wilkinson (3), Campbell
20	26 December 1994	Hereford United	H	7–1	2,887	Donaldson (2), Baraclough, Hadley, Howarth, Ireland, Wilkinson
21	27 December 1994	Scarborough	A	5–2	1,926	Donaldson (2), Baraclough, Wilkinson, Noteman
22	31 December 1994	Barnet	H	3–0	2,891	Donaldson (2), Ireland
23	2 January 1995	Fulham	A	2–4	4,151	Baraclough, Hadley
24	10 January 1995	Doncaster Rovers	A	2–0	2,577	Hadley (2)
25	14 January 1995	Wigan Athletic	H	4–3	2,618	Holland, Peters, Wilkinson, Doolan
26	21 January 1995	Preston North End	A	1–2	8,448	Lampkin
27	4 February 1995	Walsall	A	0–1	4,396	
28	18 February 1995	Wigan Athletic	A	4–0	1,884	Holland (2), Hadley (2)
29	21 February 1995	Scunthorpe United	H	1–0	3,079	Wilkinson
30	25 February 1995	Gillingham	H	4–0	3,182	Wilkinson, Holland, Ireland, Parkin
31	4 March 1995	Exeter City	A	3–2	2,458	Wilkinson (2), Onuora
32	7 March 1995	Rochdale	H	1–1	2,931	Wilkinson
33	11 March 1995	Lincoln City	H	6–2	3,396	Noteman (2), Donaldson (3), Hadley
34	18 March 1995	Darlington	A	0–0	1,623	
35	25 March 1995	Bury	A	2–2	4,188	Onuora, Wilkinson
36	1 April 1995	Carlisle United	H	1–2	5,197	Lampkin
37	8 April 1995	Barnet	A	2–2	2,115	Wilkinson, Phillips (o.g.)
38	15 April 1995	Scarborough	H	3–2	2,931	Wilkinson, Ireland, Hadley
39	17 April 1995	Hereford United	A	0–0	2,796	
40	22 April 1995	Fulham	H	1–1	2,861	Peters
41	29 April 1995	Torquay United	H	2–2	3,216	Wilkinson, Onuora
42	6 May 1995	Hartlepool United	A	2–3	3,049	Ireland, Onuora

=== Football League Third Division play-offs ===
Round	Date	Opponent	Venue	Result	Attendance	Scorers
Semi-final 1st leg	14 May 1995	Chesterfield	H	1–1	6,528	Hadley
Semi-final 2nd leg	17 May 1995	Chesterfield	A	2–5	8,165	Wilkinson, Holland

=== FA Cup ===
Round	Date	Opponent	Venue	Result	Attendance	Scorers
R1	22 November 1994	Northwich Victoria	H	3–1	2,999	Hadley, Holland (2)
R2	3 December 1994	Halifax Town	A	0–0	2,369	
R2 Replay	13 December 1994	Halifax Town	H	2–1	2,648	Holland, Aspinall
R3	7 January 1995	Wolverhampton Wanderers	H	2–3	2,648	Donaldson, Ireland

=== League Cup ===
Round	Date	Opponent	Venue	Result	Attendance	Scorers
R1 1st leg	18 August 1994	Rochdale	A	2–1	1,746	Wilkinson (2)
R1 2nd leg	23 August 1994	Rochdale	H	1–0	2,234	Wilkinson
R2 1st leg	21 September 1994	Leeds United	A	1–0	7,844	Ireland
R2 2nd leg	4 October 1994	Leeds United	H	0–0	7,227	
R3	25 October 1994	Millwall	H	0–2	5,359	

=== League Trophy ===
Round	Date	Opponent	Venue	Result	Attendance	Scorers
R1	18 October 1994	Wrexham	A	0–2	1,002	
R1	8 November 1994	Crewe Alexandra	H	2–2	1,250	Alexander (2)

== Squad statistics ==
- Squad list sourced from 1994–95 Mansfield Town F.C. season at the English National Football Archive (subscription required)

Pos.	Name	League		FA Cup		League Cup		League Trophy		Play-offs		Total	
Pos.	Name	Apps	Goals	Apps	Goals	Apps	Goals	Apps	Goals	Apps	Goals	Apps	Goals
GK	(England) Jason Pearcey	3	0	0	0	0	0	1	0	0	0	4	0
GK	(England) Jason Trinder	4(3)	0	0	0	0	0	0	0	0	0	4(3)	0
GK	(England) Darren Ward	35	0	4	0	5	0	1	0	2	0	47	0
DF	(South Africa) Brendan Aspinall	13(7)	0	2(1)	1	3	0	2	0	0	0	16(8)	1
DF	(England) Ian Baraclough	36	3	4	0	5	0	1	0	2	0	48	3
DF	(England) Aidy Boothroyd	35(1)	0	4	0	5	0	1	0	2	0	47(1)	0
DF	(England) Mark Clifford	1	0	0	0	0	0	0	0	0	0	1	0
DF	(England) Paul Fleming	2	0	0	0	1	0	0	0	0	0	3	0
DF	(England) Lee Howarth	39(1)	2	3	0	5	0	2	0	2	0	51(1)	2
DF	(England) Colin Hoyle	4(1)	0	0	0	2	0	1	0	0	0	7(1)	0
DF	(England) Paul Sherlock	1(1)	0	0	0	0	0	0	0	0(1)	0	1(2)	0
DF	(England) Chris Timons	4(2)	0	0	0	0	0	2	0	0	0	6(2)	0
DF	(England) Richard Walker	4	0	0	0	0	0	0	0	0	0	4	0
MF	(England) Jamie Campbell	3	1	2	0	0	0	0	0	0	0	5	1
MF	(Scotland) Gary Castledine	3(7)	0	0	0	2	0	1	0	0	0	6(7)	0
MF	(England) John Doolan	21(3)	1	2	0	2	0	1	0	1	0	26(3)	1
MF	(England) Efon Elad	0(2)	0	0	0	0	0	0	0	0	0	0(2)	0
MF	(England) David Frain	4(2)	0	0	0	1	0	0	0	0	0	5(2)	0
MF	(England) Paul Holland	33	9	4	3	5	0	1	0	2	1	45	13
MF	(England) Simon Ireland	38(2)	5	4	1	5	1	1	0	2	0	50(2)	7
MF	(England) Kevin Lampkin	22(1)	2	1	0	0	0	0	0	2	0	25(1)	2
MF	(England) Steve Parkin	22	1	1(1)	0	2	0	0	0	2	0	27(1)	1
MF	(England) Wayne Stark	0	0	0	0	0	0	1	0	0	0	1	0
FW	(England) Keith Alexander	0(2)	0	0	0	0	0	0(1)	2	0	0	0(3)	2
FW	(England) O'Neill Donaldson	4	6	1	1	0	0	0	0	0	0	5	7
FW	(England) Stewart Hadley	28(11)	14	3	1	5	0	1	0	2	1	39(11)	16
FW	(England) Kevin Noteman	27(5)	6	2	0	5	0	2	0	0	0	36(5)	6
FW	(Scotland) Iffy Onuora	10(4)	7	0	0	0	0	0	0	1	0	11(4)	7
FW	(England) John Pearson	0(2)	0	1(1)	0	0	0	0	0	0	0	1(3)	0
FW	(Wales) Mark Peters	25(1)	4	2	0	2	0	1	0	2	0	32(1)	4
FW	(England) Steve Wilkinson	41	22	4	0	5	3	1	0	2	1	53	26
FW	(England) Mike Williams	0(1)	0	0	0	0	0	0	0	0	0	0(1)	0
–	Own goals	–	1	–	0	–	0	–	0	–	0	–	1
