= 1992–93 Huddersfield Town A.F.C. season =

Huddersfield Town
1992–93 season
- Chairman: Keith Longbottom; Graham Leslie; Terry Fisher
- Manager: Ian Ross
- Stadium: Leeds Road
- Second Division: 15th
- FA Cup: Fourth round (eliminated by Southend United)
- League Cup: Second round (eliminated by Blackburn Rovers)
- League Trophy: Area semi-finals (eliminated by Wigan Athletic)
- Top goalscorer: League: Iwan Roberts; Phil Starbuck (9); All: Iwan Roberts (15)
- Highest home attendance: 11,089 vs Stoke City (7 April 1993)
- Lowest home attendance: 1,236 vs Halifax Town (15 December 1992)
- Biggest win: 5–0 vs Halifax Town (15 December 1992)
- Biggest defeat: 0–5 vs Stockport County (30 October 1992)

Huddersfield Town's 1992–93 campaign was Town's first season playing in the newly reformed Division 2, following the creation of the breakaway Premier League. Following defeat in the play-offs the previous season, many were hoping for automatic promotion to the new Division 1. But Ian Ross' team had a dreadful start and never really got going. They were certainties for relegation until the arrival of former Town boss Mick Buxton as first team coach. With Buxton's help, Town won 12 of the last 16 matches and stayed up comfortably, finishing 15th.

== Squad at the start of the season ==
Note: Flags indicate national team as defined under FIFA eligibility rules; some limited exceptions apply. Players may hold more than one non-FIFA nationality.

Pos.	Nation	Player
GK	ENG	Tim Clarke
GK	ENG	Tony Elliott
DF	ENG	Simon Charlton
DF	ENG	Peter Jackson
DF	ENG	Kevin Lampkin
DF	ENG	Graham Mitchell
DF	ENG	Neil Parsley
DF	ENG	Simon Trevitt
DF	ENG	Mark Wright

Pos.	Nation	Player
MF	ENG	Gary Barnett
MF	ENG	Chris Billy
MF	ENG	Simon Ireland
MF	ENG	Chris Marsden
MF	IRL	Kieran O'Regan
FW	ENG	Andy Booth
FW	SCO	Iffy Onuora
FW	WAL	Iwan Roberts
FW	ENG	Phil Starbuck

== Review ==
Following the surprise defeat to Peterborough United, many thought Town would go all the way under Ian Ross, but after 6 games, promotion to Division 1 seemed miles away. Town lost all of their first 6 league games, making it the worst start in the club's history. The only bright lights in the early start of the season were the cup win over Sunderland and a respectable draw against Premier League side Blackburn Rovers in the League Cup. Town eventually lost 5–4 on aggregate to the Lancashire side.

The mid-season for Town brought virtually no joy to Town either with a run of 5 consecutive defeats. There was hope on the horizon as ex-Town manager Mick Buxton joined up as assistant manager and results started to improve. During this run Town also managed to reach the fourth round of the FA Cup, before eventually losing to Southend United.

At the end of the season, Town went on a run of only 2 defeats in their last 17 league games. Simon Charlton managed to get into the Division 2 Team of the Season and just after the season's end, he moved to Premier League Southampton.

== Squad at the end of the season ==
Note: Flags indicate national team as defined under FIFA eligibility rules; some limited exceptions apply. Players may hold more than one non-FIFA nationality.

Pos.	Nation	Player
GK	ENG	Tim Clarke
GK	ENG	Tony Elliott
DF	ENG	Simon Charlton
DF	ENG	Jon Dyson
DF	ENG	Peter Jackson
DF	ENG	Kevin Lampkin
DF	ENG	Graham Mitchell
DF	ENG	Neil Parsley
DF	ENG	Simon Trevitt
DF	ENG	Mark Wright
MF	ENG	Gary Barnett

Pos.	Nation	Player
MF	ENG	Chris Billy
MF	ENG	Mark Cooper (on loan from Fulham)
MF	ENG	Chris Marsden
MF	IRL	Kieran O'Regan
MF	ENG	Phil Robinson
MF	ENG	Mark Stuart
FW	ENG	Andy Booth
FW	ENG	Iain Dunn
FW	SCO	Iffy Onuora
FW	WAL	Iwan Roberts
FW	ENG	Phil Starbuck

== Results ==
=== Second Division ===
Date	Opponents	Home/ Away	Result F – A	Scorers	Attendance	Position
15 August 1992	Bolton Wanderers	A	0–2		7,897	23rd
22 August 1992	West Bromwich Albion	H	0–1		7,947	23rd
29 August 1992	Hartlepool United	A	0–1		4,120	24th
1 September 1992	Leyton Orient	A	1–4	Starbuck	3,765	24th
6 September 1992	Bradford City	H	1–2	Barnett	5,883	24th
12 September 1992	Brighton & Hove Albion	A	1–2	Roberts (pen)	6,141	24th
15 September 1992	Plymouth Argyle	H	2–1	Jackson, Roberts	4,411	23rd
19 September 1992	Swansea City	H	1–2	Roberts	4,839	24th
26 September 1992	Bournemouth	A	1–1	Roberts	4,447	24th
3 October 1992	Rotherham United	A	0–1		5,459	24th
10 October 1992	Reading	H	0–0		5,281	24th
17 October 1992	Hull City	A	3–2	Starbuck, Robinson, Roberts	4,705	23rd
24 October 1992	Exeter City	H	0–0		4,707	23rd
30 October 1992	Stockport County	A	0–5		5,405	23rd
3 November 1992	Blackpool	A	2–2	Booth, Stuart	3,441	24th
7 November 1992	Mansfield Town	H	2–1	Booth, Stuart	4,933	23rd
21 November 1992	Burnley	A	1–2	Robinson	10,615	23rd
28 November 1992	Port Vale	H	1–2	Robinson	5,822	23rd
12 December 1992	Stoke City	A	0–3		13,377	23rd
19 December 1992	Chester City	H	0–2		4,626	23rd
16 January 1993	Bournemouth	H	0–1		4,316	24th
27 January 1993	Hartlepool United	H	3–0	O'Regan (pen), Starbuck, Roberts	4,153	24th
30 January 1993	West Bromwich Albion	A	2–2	Dunn, Starbuck	13,667	24th
6 February 1993	Bolton Wanderers	H	1–1	O'Regan (pen)	8,858	24th
14 February 1993	Bradford City	A	1–0	Barnett	8,214	23rd
16 February 1993	Wigan Athletic	A	0–1		2,474	23rd
20 February 1993	Leyton Orient	H	1–1	Stuart	5,112	24th
27 February 1993	Reading	A	1–2	Roberts	3,948	24th
3 March 1993	Brighton & Hove Albion	H	1–2	Starbuck	3,563	24th
6 March 1993	Rotherham United	H	1–1	Roberts	5,235	23rd
10 March 1993	Fulham	H	1–0	O'Regan (pen)	3,670	23rd
13 March 1993	Mansfield Town	A	2–1	Onuora, Barnett	3,987	23rd
17 March 1993	Preston North End	H	1–0	Onuora	4,915	23rd
20 March 1993	Blackpool	H	5–2	O'Regan (pen), Barnett, Starbuck, Onuora (2)	6,249	20th
23 March 1993	Port Vale	A	0–1		7,747	22nd
27 March 1993	Burnley	H	1–1	Starbuck	9,411	23rd
30 March 1993	Plymouth Argyle	A	3–1	Onuora (2), Barnett	4,986	22nd
2 April 1993	Fulham	A	1–0	Roberts	3,611	18th
7 April 1993	Stoke City	H	1–0	Dunn	11,089	16th
10 April 1993	Preston North End	A	1–2	Robinson	7,647	18th
12 April 1993	Wigan Athletic	H	2–1	Barnett, Starbuck	6,822	15th
17 April 1993	Chester City	A	2–0	Dunn, Cooper	3,019	15th
20 April 1993	Swansea City	A	0–3		5,190	15th
24 April 1993	Hull City	H	3–0	O'Regan (pen), Charlton, Starbuck	6,607	15th
1 May 1993	Exeter City	A	2–1	Cooper (2)	3,271	15th
8 May 1993	Stockport County	H	2–1	Cooper, Barnett	7,673	15th

=== FA Cup ===
Date	Round	Opponents	Home/ Away	Result F – A	Scorers	Attendance
14 November 1992	Round 1	Scunthorpe United	A	0–0		4,312
25 November 1992	Round 1 Replay	Scunthorpe United	H	2–1	Barnett (2)	4,841
6 December 1992	Round 2	Bradford City	A	2–0	Dunn, O'Regan (pen)	10,606
2 January 1993	Round 3	Gillingham	A	0–0		5,413
13 January 1993	Round 3 Replay	Gillingham	H	2–1	Robinson, Dunn	5,144
23 January 1993	Round 4	Southend United	H	1–2	Mitchell	7,961

=== League Cup ===
Date	Round	Opponents	Home/ Away	Result F – A	Scorers	Attendance
18 August 1992	Round 1 1st Leg	Sunderland	A	3–2	Starbuck, Parsley, Roberts	10,726
26 August 1992	Round 1 2nd Leg	Sunderland	H	0–1 (aet: 90 mins: 0–1)		6,737: 3–3 on aggregate, Huddersfield won on away goals rule.
23 September 1992	Round 2 1st Leg	Blackburn Rovers	H	1–1	Onuora	11,071
6 October 1992	Round 2 2nd Leg	Blackburn Rovers	A	3–4 (aet: 90 mins: 2–2)	Barnett, Roberts, Ireland	15,038: Huddersfield lost 5–4 on aggregate

=== Football League Trophy ===
Date	Round	Opponents	Home/ Away	Result F – A	Scorers	Attendance
9 December 1992	Round 1 Group 2	Bradford City	A	0–0		1,638
15 December 1992	Round 1 Group 2	Halifax Town	H	5–0	Dunn (3), Roberts (2)	1,236
20 January 1993	Round 2	Doncaster Rovers	H	3–0	Barnett, Dunn, O'Regan (pen)	1,535
2 February 1993	Area Quarter-Final	Bolton Wanderers	H	3–0	Roberts, Stubbs (og), Stuart	2,996
23 February 1993	Area Semi-Final	Wigan Athletic	A	2–5	Roberts, Starbuck	2,978

== Appearances and goals ==
Name	Nationality	Position	League		FA Cup		League Cup		Football League Trophy		Total	
Name	Nationality	Position	Apps	Goals	Apps	Goals	Apps	Goals	Apps	Goals	Apps	Goals
Gary Barnett	England	MF	45 (1)	7	6	2	4	1	5	1	60 (1)	11
Chris Billy	England	MF	4 (9)	0	0	0	1 (1)	0	0 (1)	0	5 (11)	0
Andy Booth	England	FW	3 (2)	2	1	0	0	0	0	0	4 (2)	2
Simon Charlton	England	DF	46	1	6	0	4	0	5	0	61	1
Tim Clarke	England	GK	31	0	3	0	2	0	2	0	38	0
Simon Collins	England	DF	0 (1)	0	0	0	0	0	0	0	0 (1)	0
Mark Cooper	England	MF	10	4	0	0	0	0	0	0	10	4
Rob Dewhurst	England	DF	7	0	0	0	0	0	0	0	7	0
Kevin Donovan	England	MF	2 (1)	0	0	0	1	0	0	0	3 (1)	0
Iain Dunn	England	FW	25 (3)	3	4	2	0	0	4 (1)	4	33 (4)	9
Jon Dyson	England	DF	15	0	2	0	2	0	2	0	21	0
Tony Elliott	England	GK	15	0	3	0	2	0	3	0	23	0
Simon Ireland	England	MF	4	0	0	0	1	1	0	0	5	1
Peter Jackson	England	DF	39	1	6	0	3	0	4	0	44	1
Kevin Lampkin	England	DF	13	0	0	0	1	0	0	0	14	0
Chris Marsden	England	MF	6 (1)	0	0	0	2	0	0	0	8 (1)	0
Graham Mitchell	England	DF	3 (1)	0	4	1	0	0	2	0	9 (1)	1
Thomas Mooney	Northern Ireland	MF	1	0	0	0	0	0	2	0	3	0
Iffy Onuora	Scotland	FW	30 (9)	6	4 (1)	0	3	1	2 (1)	0	39 (11)	7
Kieran O'Regan	Republic of Ireland	MF	37 (4)	5	4	1	4	0	5	1	50 (4)	7
Neil Parsley	England	DF	44	0	6	0	4	1	5	0	59	1
Iwan Roberts	Wales	FW	37	9	5	0	4	2	5	4	51	15
Phil Robinson	England	MF	35 (1)	4	6	1	1	1	2	0	44 (1)	6
Mark Smith	England	DF	5	0	0	0	0	0	0	0	5	0
Phil Starbuck	England	FW	29 (9)	9	2 (1)	0	2 (1)	1	2 (2)	1	35 (13)	11
Mark Stuart	England	MF	9 (6)	3	2	0	0	0	4	1	15 (6)	4
Mark Wright	England	DF	11 (3)	0	2 (1)	0	3	0	1 (1)	0	17 (5)	0
