= 1993–94 Mansfield Town F.C. season =

Mansfield Town
1993–94 season
- Manager: George Foster; Bill Dearden; Andy King
- Stadium: Field Mill
- Third Division: 12th
- FA Cup: First Round
- League Cup: First Round
- Football League Trophy: Quarter Final

The 1993–94 season was Mansfield Town's 57th season in the Football League and 21st in the Third Division they finished in 12th position with 55 points.

== Final league table ==
Pos	Team	Pld	W	D	L	GF	GA	GD	Pts
10	Walsall	42	17	9	16	48	53	−5	60
11	Scunthorpe United	42	15	14	13	64	56	+8	59
12	Mansfield Town	42	15	10	17	53	62	−9	55
13	Bury	42	14	11	17	55	56	−1	53
14	Scarborough	42	15	8	19	55	61	−6	53

== Results ==
=== Football League Third Division ===
Match	Date	Opponent	Venue	Result	Attendance	Scorers
1	14 August 1993	Shrewsbury Town	H	1–0	2,983	Noteman
2	28 August 1993	Scunthorpe United	H	0–1	2,751	
3	31 August 1993	Chesterfield	A	2–0	5,712	Clarke, Wilson
4	4 September 1993	Crewe Alexandra	A	1–2	3,115	Stant
5	11 September 1993	Lincoln City	H	1–0	2,678	Wilkinson
6	17 September 1993	Doncaster Rovers	A	1–0	4,340	Noteman
7	25 September 1993	Preston North End	H	2–2	3,762	Noteman, Wilkinson
8	2 October 1993	Bury	A	2–2	2,317	Reed, Stringfellow
9	9 October 1993	Scarborough	H	4–2	2,589	Gray, Stringfellow, Noteman, Young (o.g.)
10	12 October 1993	Northampton Town	A	1–5	2,842	McLoughlin
11	16 October 1993	Carlisle United	A	1–1	4,480	Stringfellow
12	23 October 1993	Chester City	A	0–4	2,545	
13	30 October 1993	Wigan Athletic	A	1–4	1,434	Clarke
14	2 November 1993	Rochdale	A	1–1	2,042	Reed
15	6 November 1993	Gillingham	H	2–1	2,421	Clarke, Holland
16	20 November 1993	Darlington	A	0–2	2,043	
17	27 November 1993	Walsall	H	1–2	2,875	Wilkinson
18	11 December 1993	Northampton Town	H	1–0	2,491	Holland
19	17 December 1993	Shrewsbury Town	A	2–2	3,392	McLoughlin, Wilkinson
20	27 December 1993	Colchester United	A	0–0	3,476	
21	1 January 1994	Torquay United	A	0–1	3,496	
22	3 January 1994	Chesterfield	H	1–2	4,272	Wilkinson
23	15 January 1994	Carlisle United	H	0–1	2,378	
24	18 January 1994	Hereford United	H	2–1	1,802	Gray, Blissett
25	22 January 1994	Scarborough	A	1–1	1,557	Holland
26	25 January 1994	Wycombe Wanderers	A	0–1	4,422	
27	29 January 1994	Wigan Athletic	H	2–3	2,285	Timons, Fairclough
28	5 February 1994	Chester City	A	1–1	2,664	Wilkinson
29	12 February 1994	Wycombe Wanderers	H	3–0	3,009	Fairclough, Hadley, Wilkinson
30	19 February 1994	Scunthorpe United	A	2–3	3,089	Holland, Hadley, Wilkinson
31	26 February 1994	Crewe Alexandra	H	1–2	3,509	Holland
32	5 March 1994	Lincoln City	A	2–1	3,384	Noteman, Johnson (o.g.)
33	12 March 1994	Doncaster Rovers	H	2–1	2,763	Rees, Parkin
34	19 March 1994	Preston North End	A	1–3	6,747	Wilkinson
35	26 March 1994	Bury	H	2–2	2,496	Holland, Hadley
36	2 April 1994	Colchester United	H	1–1	2,117	Holland
37	4 April 1994	Hereford United	A	3–2	1,996	Wilkinson (2), Hadley
38	9 April 1994	Torquay United	H	2–1	2,260	Ireland, Boothroyd
39	16 April 1994	Rochdale	H	0–1	2,362	
40	23 April 1994	Gillingham	A	0–1	2,464	
41	30 April 1994	Darlington	H	0–3	2,734	
42	7 May 1994	Walsall	A	2–0	4,304	Sykes, Lampkin

=== FA Cup ===
Round	Date	Opponent	Venue	Result	Attendance	Scorers
R1	13 November 1993	Preston North End	H	1–2	4,119	Wilkinson

=== League Cup ===
Round	Date	Opponent	Venue	Result	Attendance	Scorers
R1 1st leg	18 August 1993	Stoke City	A	2–2	8,976	Noteman, McLoughlin
R1 2nd leg	24 August 1993	Stoke City	H	1–3	4,214	Stant

=== League Trophy ===
Round	Date	Opponent	Venue	Result	Attendance	Scorers
R1	28 September 1993	Lincoln City	A	0–1	1,449	
R1	19 October 1993	Chesterfield	H	3–1	2,291	Stringfellow (2), Reed
R2	4 December 1993	York City	A	1–1 (5–4 pens)	1,760	Reed
QF	11 January 1993	Carlisle United	A	1–2	8,868	Gray

== Squad statistics ==
- Squad list sourced from 1993–94 Mansfield Town F.C. season at the English National Football Archive (subscription required)

Pos.	Name	League		FA Cup		League Cup		League Trophy		Total	
Pos.	Name	Apps	Goals	Apps	Goals	Apps	Goals	Apps	Goals	Apps	Goals
GK	(England) Jason Pearcey	9	0	0	0	2	0	1	0	12	0
GK	(Wales) Darren Ward	33	0	1	0	0	0	3	0	37	0
DF	(England) Aidy Boothroyd	22(1)	1	0	0	0	0	0(1)	0	22(2)	1
DF	(England) Nicky Clarke	14(1)	3	1	0	2	0	1	0	18(1)	3
DF	(England) Wayne Fairclough	27(2)	2	0(1)	0	2	0	3	0	32(3)	2
DF	(England) Paul Fleming	25(3)	0	1	0	0	0	4	0	30(3)	0
DF	(England) Steve Foster	2(3)	0	0	0	2	0	0	0	4(3)	0
DF	(England) Kevin Gray	42	2	1	0	2	0	4	1	49	3
DF	(England) Chris Perkins	2(1)	0	0	0	0	0	0(1)	0	2(2)	0
DF	(England) Nick Platnauer	25	0	1	0	2	0	4	0	32	0
DF	(England) Chris Timons	15(1)	1	0	0	0	0	0(1)	0	15(2)	1
MF	(Scotland) Gary Castledine	14(7)	0	0	0	0	0	3	0	17(7)	0
MF	(England) Paul Holland	38	7	1	0	2	0	3	0	44	7
MF	(England) Simon Ireland	8(1)	1	0	0	0	0	0	0	8(1)	1
MF	(England) Kevin Lampkin	11(2)	1	0	0	0	0	0	0	11(2)	1
MF	(England) Steve Parkin	21(2)	1	1	0	0	0	2(1)	0	24(3)	1
MF	(Wales) Jason Rees	15	1	0	0	0	0	1	0	16	1
MF	(England) Wayne Stark	0(1)	0	0	0	0	0	0	0	0(1)	0
FW	(England) Luther Blissett	4(1)	1	0	0	0	0	0	0	4(1)	1
FW	(England) Stewart Hadley	14	4	0	0	0	0	0	0	14	4
FW	(England) Chris Kerry	1(1)	0	0	0	0	0	0	0	1(1)	0
FW	(England) Paul McLoughlin	19(4)	2	0	0	2	1	3	0	24(4)	3
FW	(England) Kevin Noteman	29(4)	5	1	0	2	1	2	0	34(4)	6
FW	(England) John Reed	12(1)	2	1	0	0	0	3	2	16(1)	4
FW	(England) Phil Stant	4	1	0	0	1	1	0	0	5	2
FW	(England) Ian Stringfellow	10(4)	3	1	0	0(2)	0	3	2	14(6)	5
FW	(England) Alex Sykes	1(1)	1	0	0	0	0	0	0	1(1)	1
FW	(England) Steve Wilkinson	36(6)	11	1	1	2	0	4	0	43(6)	12
FW	(England) Lee Wilson	9(5)	1	0	0	1(1)	0	0(2)	0	10(8)	1
–	Own goals	–	2	–	0	–	0	–	0	–	2
