= 1995–96 Mansfield Town F.C. season =

Mansfield Town
1995–96 season
- Manager: Andy King
- Stadium: Field Mill
- Third Division: 18th
- FA Cup: Second Round
- League Cup: First Round
- Football League Trophy: First Round

The 1995–96 season was Mansfield Town's 59th season in the Football League and 23rd in the Third Division they finished in 18th position with 53 points.

== Final league table ==
Pos	Team	Pld	W	D	L	GF	GA	GD	Pts
17	Fulham	46	12	17	17	57	63	−6	53
18	Lincoln City	46	13	14	19	57	73	−16	53
19	Mansfield Town	46	11	20	15	54	64	−10	53
20	Hartlepool United	46	12	13	21	47	67	−20	49
21	Leyton Orient	46	12	11	23	44	63	−19	47

== Results ==
=== Football League Third Division ===
Match	Date	Opponent	Venue	Result	Attendance	Scorers
1	12 August 1995	Fulham	A	2–4	4,909	Carmichael, Sherlock
2	19 August 1995	Leyton Orient	H	0–0	2,565	
3	26 August 1995	Northampton Town	A	3–3	4,797	Sale (2), Baraclough
4	29 August 1995	Doncaster Rovers	H	0–0	2,944	
5	2 September 1995	Torquay United	A	1–1	2,203	Sale
6	9 September 1995	Scarborough	H	2–0	2,419	Baraclough, Ireland
7	12 September 1995	Darlington	H	2–2	2,190	Slawson, Sale
8	16 September 1995	Rochdale	A	1–1	2,173	Slawson
9	23 September 1995	Scunthorpe United	H	1–1	2,478	Ireland
10	30 September 1995	Cardiff City	A	0–3	3,468	
11	7 October 1995	Wigan Athletic	A	6–2	2,084	Hadley (3), Peters, Harper, Doolan
12	14 October 1995	Plymouth Argyle	H	1–1	3,164	Ireland
13	21 October 1995	Preston North End	A	0–6	8,981	
14	28 October 1995	Bury	H	1–5	2,356	Doolan
15	1 November 1995	Lincoln City	H	1–2	2,398	Sale
16	4 November 1995	Hereford United	A	1–0	2,182	Harper
17	18 November 1995	Chester City	H	3–4	2,415	Hadley (3)
18	25 November 1995	Colchester United	A	3–1	2,819	Hadley, Boothroyd, Ireland
19	9 December 1995	Scunthorpe United	A	1–1	2,552	Barber
20	16 December 1995	Cardiff City	H	1–1	2,212	Parkin
21	23 December 1995	Hartlepool United	H	0–3	2,212	
22	26 December 1995	Barnet	A	0–0	2,204	
23	6 January 1996	Exeter City	H	1–1	1,853	Harper
24	13 January 1996	Leyton Orient	A	0–1	3,461	
25	20 January 1996	Fulham	H	1–0	2,025	Slawson
26	23 January 1996	Cambridge United	H	2–1	1,801	Sale, Sherlock
27	30 January 1996	Gillingham	A	0–2	6,111	
28	3 February 1996	Northampton Town	H	0–0	2,981	
29	13 February 1996	Exeter City	A	2–2	2,507	Hackett, Onuora
30	17 February 1996	Darlington	A	1–1	2,598	Ireland
31	27 February 1996	Scarborough	A	1–1	1,304	Slawson
32	2 March 1996	Barnet	H	2–1	2,146	Hackett, Peters
33	9 March 1996	Hartlepool United	A	1–1	1,758	Slawson
34	16 March 1996	Gillingham	H	0–1	2,698	
35	23 March 1996	Cambridge United	A	2–0	2,302	Sale, Timons
36	25 March 1996	Doncaster Rovers	A	0–0	1,657	
37	30 March 1996	Wigan Athletic	H	1–0	2,396	Hackett
38	2 April 1996	Plymouth Argyle	A	0–1	6,375	
39	6 April 1996	Bury	A	1–0	3,600	Harper, Wood
40	8 April 1996	Preston North End	H	0–0	4,626	
41	13 April 1996	Lincoln City	A	1–2	2,992	Ireland
42	16 April 1996	Rochdale	H	2–2	1,814	Boothroyd, Williams
43	20 April 1996	Hereford United	H	1–2	2,358	Harper
44	23 April 1996	Torquay United	H	2–0	1,674	Williams (2)
45	27 April 1996	Colchester United	H	1–2	2,073	Eustace
46	4 May 1996	Chester City	A	1–2	2,935	Robinson

=== FA Cup ===
Round	Date	Opponent	Venue	Result	Attendance	Scorers
R1	11 November 1995	Doncaster Rovers	H	4–2	3,116	Harper, Sherlock, Doolan, Parkin
R2	2 December 1995	Crewe Alexandra	A	0–2	3,694	

=== League Cup ===
Round	Date	Opponent	Venue	Result	Attendance	Scorers
R1 1st leg	15 August 1995	Burnley	H	0–1	2,554	
R1 2nd leg	22 August 1995	Burnley	A	1–3	4,679	Sale

=== League Trophy ===
Round	Date	Opponent	Venue	Result	Attendance	Scorers
R1	26 September 1995	Wrexham	H	2–2	1,037	Hadley, Doolan
R1	7 November 1995	York City	A	0–1	1,571	

== Squad statistics ==
- Squad list sourced from 1995–96 Mansfield Town F.C. season at the English National Football Archive (subscription required)

Pos.	Name	League		FA Cup		League Cup		League Trophy		Total	
Pos.	Name	Apps	Goals	Apps	Goals	Apps	Goals	Apps	Goals	Apps	Goals
GK	(England) Ian Bowling	44	0	2	0	2	0	1	0	49	0
GK	(England) Jason Trinder	1	0	0	0	0	0	1	0	2	0
GK	(England) Nicky Weaver	1	0	0	0	0	0	0	0	1	0
DF	(England) Ian Baraclough	11	2	0	0	2	0	1	0	14	2
DF	(England) Aidy Boothroyd	42(1)	2	2	0	2	0	2	0	48(1)	2
DF	(Republic of Ireland) Tony Brien	4	0	0	0	0	0	0	0	4	0
DF	(England) Warren Hackett	32	3	2	0	0	0	0	0	34	3
DF	(England) Lee Howarth	17	0	1	0	2	0	1	0	21	0
DF	(England) Brian Kilcline	18(1)	0	0	0	0	0	0	0	18(1)	0
DF	(England) Paul Sherlock	14(4)	2	2	1	1	0	0	0	17(4)	3
DF	(England) Chris Timons	16(1)	1	0	0	0	0	0	0	16(1)	1
MF	(England) Phil Barber	4	1	0	0	0	0	1	0	5	1
MF	(England) Darrell Clarke	1(2)	0	0	0	0	0	0	0	1(2)	0
MF	(England) John Doolan	42	2	1	1	2	0	2	1	47	4
MF	(England) Scott Eustace	25(2)	1	1	0	0	0	2	0	28(2)	1
MF	(England) Simon Ireland	38(1)	6	2	0	2	0	1(1)	0	43(2)	6
MF	(Scotland) David Kerr	4(1)	0	0	0	0	0	1	0	5(1)	0
MF	(England) Kevin Lampkin	2(4)	0	0	0	0(1)	0	0	0	2(5)	0
MF	(England) Steve Parkin	25(1)	1	2	1	2	0	1	0	30(1)	2
MF	(England) Ben Sedgemore	4(5)	0	0	0	0	0	1	0	5(5)	0
MF	(England) Ian Robinson	4(5)	1	0	0	0(1)	0	0	0	4(6)	1
MF	(Northern Ireland) Mark Todd	10(2)	0	0	0	0	0	0	0	10(2)	0
FW	(England) Keith Alexander	0(1)	0	0	0	0(1)	0	0	0	0(2)	0
FW	(England) Matt Carmichael	1	1	0	0	0	0	0	0	1	1
FW	(England) Stewart Hadley	27(6)	7	2	0	2	0	1(1)	1	32(7)	8
FW	(England) Steve Harper	29	5	2	1	0	0	2	0	33	6
FW	(Scotland) Iffy Onuora	7(7)	1	0(1)	0	0	0	0	0	7(8)	1
FW	(England) Nathan Peel	2	0	0	0	0	0	1	0	3	0
FW	(Wales) Mark Peters	21	2	2	0	1	0	1	0	25	2
FW	(England) Mark Sale	24(3)	7	1	0	2	1	1	0	28(3)	8
FW	(England) Steve Slawson	21(8)	5	0	0	2	0	1(1)	0	24(9)	5
FW	(England) Imre Varadi	1	0	0	0	0	0	0	0	1	0
FW	(England) Anthony Ward	17	11	0	0	0	0	0	0	5(5)	3
FW	(England) Simon Wood	9(1)	1	0	0	0	0	0	0	9(1)	1
–	Own goals	–	0	–	0	–	0	–	0	–	0
