= 1991–92 Huddersfield Town A.F.C. season =

Huddersfield Town
1991–92 season
- Chairman: Keith Longbottom
- Manager: Eoin Hand (until 6 March 1992); Ian Ross (from 6 March 1992)
- Third Division: 3rd
- Play-offs: Semi-finals (eliminated by Peterborough United)
- FA Cup: Third round (eliminated by Millwall)
- League Cup: Third round (eliminated by Swindon Town)
- Associate Members' Cup: Area semi-finals (eliminated by Burnley)
- Top goalscorer: League: Iwan Roberts (25); All: Iwan Roberts (35)
- Highest home attendance: 16,167 vs Peterborough United (14 May 1992)
- Lowest home attendance: 1,134 vs Scarborough (19 November 1991)
- Biggest win: 5–0 vs Halifax Town (15 December 1992)
- Biggest defeat: 0–5 vs Stockport County (30 October 1992)
Home colours

Huddersfield Town's 1991–92 campaign saw them finish 3rd, despite getting rid of Eoin Hand and replacing him with his assistant manager Ian Ross. Town missed out on promotion to Division 2, following their defeat to Peterborough United in the play-offs.

== Squad at the start of the season ==
Note: Flags indicate national team as defined under FIFA eligibility rules; some limited exceptions apply. Players may hold more than one non-FIFA nationality.

Pos.	Nation	Player
GK	ENG	Tim Clarke
GK	ENG	Lee Martin
DF	IRL	Dave Campbell
DF	ENG	Simon Charlton
DF	ENG	Peter Jackson
DF	ENG	Graham Mitchell
DF	IRL	Ken O'Doherty
DF	ENG	Neil Parsley
DF	ENG	Simon Trevitt
DF	ENG	Mark Wright

Pos.	Nation	Player
MF	ENG	Gary Barnett
MF	ENG	Kevin Donovan
MF	ENG	Simon Ireland
MF	ENG	John Kelly
MF	ENG	Chris Marsden
MF	IRL	Kieran O'Regan
FW	ENG	Gary Haylock
FW	SCO	Iffy Onuora
FW	WAL	Iwan Roberts
FW	ENG	Phil Starbuck

== Review ==
With 3 years gone since Town's relegation from Division 2, some Town fans were beginning to wonder if Eoin Hand was going to get them promoted. Phil Starbuck was brought in from Nottingham Forest and he helped bring in the goals along with Iffy Onuora and Iwan Roberts. Town made a fairly good start to the season, with only one loss in their first 9 games. Form was intermittent with losses and wins more often than not. They were still hunting for an automatic promotion or a play-off place.

After Christmas, Town's form gradually got worse, with a run of only 2 wins in 12, which saw Eoin Hand given the sack on 6 March. His assistant Ian Ross replaced him immediately and after a win against Shrewsbury Town, Town lost 3 games in a row, but they then won 7 out of their last 8 games, which gave them 3rd place in the table, so they had a two-legged play-off match against Peterborough United.

In the first leg at London Road, Town got a very respectable 2–2 draw, which seemed to suggest that Town's chances of progressing to the final to play Stockport County. Town took an early lead at Leeds Road thanks to a goal from Phil Starbuck, but Peterborough got 2 late goals to send them through to the final at Wembley, where they beat Stockport and got promotion to the newly created Division 1. So, because of the formation of the new Premier League, Town actually did play in Division 2 the next season.

== Squad at the end of the season ==
Note: Flags indicate national team as defined under FIFA eligibility rules; some limited exceptions apply. Players may hold more than one non-FIFA nationality.

Pos.	Nation	Player
GK	ENG	Tim Clarke
GK	ENG	Lee Martin
DF	ENG	Simon Charlton
DF	ENG	Peter Jackson
DF	ENG	Graham Mitchell
DF	IRL	Ken O'Doherty
DF	ENG	Neil Parsley
DF	ENG	Simon Trevitt
DF	ENG	Mark Wright
MF	ENG	Gary Barnett

Pos.	Nation	Player
MF	ENG	Chris Billy
MF	ENG	Kevin Donovan
MF	ENG	Simon Ireland
MF	ENG	John Kelly
MF	ENG	Chris Marsden
MF	IRL	Kieran O'Regan
FW	ENG	Andy Booth
FW	SCO	Iffy Onuora
FW	WAL	Iwan Roberts
FW	ENG	Phil Starbuck

== Results ==
=== Division Three ===
Date	Opponents	Home/ Away	Result F – A	Scorers	Attendance	Position
17 August 1991	Bolton Wanderers	A	1–1	Marsden	7,606	11th
25 August 1991	Bradford City	H	1–0	O'Regan	9,234	6th
31 August 1991	Brentford	A	3–2	O'Regan (pen), Roberts, Starbuck	5,459	5th
4 September 1991	Chester City	H	2–0	Onuora, Barnett	5,321	3rd
7 September 1991	Exeter City	H	0–0		5,758	3rd
14 September 1991	Bury	A	4–4	Roberts (2), Starbuck (2)	4,409	4th
17 September 1991	Wigan Athletic	A	3–1	Starbuck (2), Roberts	3,531	2nd
21 September 1991	Bournemouth	H	0–0		6,802	4th
28 September 1991	Leyton Orient	A	0–1		3,740	5th
5 October 1991	Swansea City	H	1–0	Roberts	5,578	5th
12 October 1991	Torquay United	A	1–0	Barnett	2,936	4th
19 October 1991	Preston North End	A	0–1		6,866	4th
25 October 1991	Stockport County	H	0–1		9,229	5th
2 November 1991	Stoke City	A	2–0	Roberts (2)	10,116	4th
6 November 1991	Fulham	H	3–1	O'Regan, Starbuck, Jackson	5,064	3rd
9 November 1991	Birmingham City	H	3–2	Roberts (2), Onuora	11,688	3rd
23 November 1991	West Bromwich Albion	A	1–2	Roberts	14,029	4th
30 November 1991	Hartlepool United	A	0–0		4,017	4th
14 December 1991	Darlington	H	2–1	Starbuck (pen), Roberts	5,677	4th
22 December 1991	Bradford City	A	1–1	Roberts	10,050	4th
26 December 1991	Brentford	H	2–1	Roberts, O'Regan	10,605	4th
28 December 1991	Bolton Wanderers	H	1–0	Roberts	11,884	4th
1 January 1992	Chester City	A	0–0		3,504	4th
11 January 1992	Reading	A	0–1		4,732	4th
18 January 1992	Peterborough United	H	0–0		8,763	5th
25 January 1992	Shrewsbury Town	A	1–1	Onuora	3,688	5th
1 February 1992	Preston North End	H	1–2	Roberts	6,700	5th
7 February 1992	Stockport County	A	0–0		7,519	5th
11 February 1992	Hartlepool United	H	1–0	Roberts	5,559	5th
15 February 1992	Darlington	A	3–1	Onuora (2), Starbuck (pen)	3,120	4th
22 February 1992	Reading	H	1–2	Roberts	6,259	5th
25 February 1992	Hull City	H	1–1	Roberts	6,003	4th
29 February 1992	Hull City	A	0–1		5,310	4th
3 March 1992	Peterborough United	A	0–2		6,257	6th
7 March 1992	Shrewsbury Town	H	2–1	Onuora, Roberts	4,674	4th
10 March 1992	Fulham	A	0–1		3,134	7th
14 March 1992	Stoke City	H	1–2	Starbuck (pen)	10,156	7th
21 March 1992	Birmingham City	A	0–2		12,482	8th
28 March 1992	West Bromwich Albion	H	3–0	Starbuck, Billy, Strodder (og)	7,428	8th
31 March 1992	Bury	H	3–0	Starbuck, Billy, Roberts	5,890	6th
4 April 1992	Exeter City	A	1–0	Roberts	3,047	6th
11 April 1992	Wigan Athletic	H	3–1	Roberts, Trevitt, Starbuck	7,058	5th
14 April 1992	Bournemouth	A	1–1	Roberts	7,655	5th
20 April 1992	Leyton Orient	H	1–0	Onuora	10,011	5th
25 April 1992	Swansea City	A	1–0	Roberts	3,964	4th
2 May 1992	Torquay United	H	4–0	Starbuck (2), Onuora, Roberts	7,961	3rd

=== Division 3 play-offs ===
Date	Round	Opponents	Home/ Away	Result F – A	Scorers	Attendance
11 May 1992	Semi-Final 1st Leg	Peterborough United	A	2–2	Onuora, Robinson (og)	11,751
14 May 1992	Semi-Final 2nd Leg	Peterborough United	H	1–2	Starbuck	16,167: Huddersfield lost 4–3 on aggregate.

=== FA Cup ===
Date	Round	Opponents	Home/ Away	Result F – A	Scorers	Attendance
16 November 1991	Round 1	Lincoln United	H	7–0	O'Regan, Donovan (2), Stapleton, Roberts (2), Onuora	6,763
7 December 1991	Round 2	Rochdale	A	2–1	Roberts, Onuora	5,776
4 January 1992	Round 3	Millwall	H	0–4		10,879

=== League Cup ===
Date	Round	Opponents	Home/ Away	Result F – A	Scorers	Attendance
20 August 1991	Round 1 1st Leg	Darlington	A	0–1		3,140
28 August 1991	Round 1 2nd Leg	Darlington	H	4–0	Roberts, Starbuck (2), Onuora	3,907: Huddersfield won 4–1 on aggregate.
24 September 1991	Round 2 1st Leg	Sunderland	A	2–1	Charlton, Starbuck	8,161
9 October 1991	Round 2 2nd Leg	Sunderland	H	4–0	Onuora, Roberts (2), Barnett	11,178: Huddersfield won 6–1 on aggregate
29 October 1991	Round 3	Swindon Town	H	1–4	Barnett	10,088

=== Associate Members' Cup ===
Date	Round	Opponents	Home/ Away	Result F – A	Scorers	Attendance	Notes
22 October 1991	Preliminary Round Group 6	Wigan Athletic	A	1–0	Roberts	1,214
19 November 1991	Preliminary Round Group 6	Scarborough	H	1–1	Roberts	1,134
14 January 1992	Round 1	Blackpool	H	1–0	Roberts	1,319	Match abandoned at half-time due to fog.
21 January 1992	Round 1	Blackpool	H	1–1	Roberts	1,585	/ Penalties; Roberts: missed (penalty missed); Mitchell (penalty scored); O'Regan (penalty scored); Wright (penalty scored) / 3–1 / (penalty missed) Horner: Clarke saved (penalty scored) Eyres; (penalty missed) Groves: Clarke saved (penalty missed) Garner: missed
4 February 1992	Area Quarter-Final	Bury	A	2–1	Onuora, Roberts	1,786
17 March 1992	Area Semi-Final	Burnley	A	0–2		10,775

== Appearances and goals ==
Name	Nationality	Position	League		FA Cup		League Cup		Associate Members' Cup		Play-offs		Total	
Name	Nationality	Position	Apps	Goals	Apps	Goals	Apps	Goals	Apps	Goals	Apps	Goals	Apps	Goals
Gary Barnett	England	MF	27+4	3	3	0	5	2	2	0	0+1	0	37+5	5
Chris Billy	England	MF	8+2	2	0	0	0	0	0	0	2	0	10+2	2
Andy Booth	England	FW	0+3	0	0	0	0	0	0	0	0	0	0+3	0
Peter Butler	England	MF	7	0	0	0	0	0	0	0	0	0	7	0
Nigel Callaghan	England	MF	8	0	0	0	0	0	1	0	0	0	9	0
Dave Campbell	Republic of Ireland	DF	3	0	0	0	0	0	0	0	0	0	3	0
Simon Charlton	England	DF	45	0	2	0	5	1	5	0	2	0	59	1
Tim Clarke	England	GK	39	0	3	0	5	0	4	0	2	0	53	0
Kevin Donovan	England	MF	4+6	0	1	2	0+1	0	4	0	0	0	9+7	2
Garry Haylock	England	FW	1	0	0	0	0	0	0	0	0	0	1	0
Simon Ireland	England	MF	3+6	0	0+1	0	0	0	1+1	0	0	0	4+8	0
Peter Jackson	England	DF	45	1	2	0	5	0	4	0	2	0	58	1
John Kelly	England	MF	13+1	0	1	0	0	0	1+2	0	2	0	17+3	0
Chris Marsden	England	MF	23	1	0	0	5	0	1	0	0	0	29	1
Lee Martin	England	GK	7	0	0	0	0	0	1	0	0	0	8	0
Neil McNab	Scotland	MF	11	0	0	0	0	0	1	0	0	0	12	0
Graham Mitchell	England	DF	43	0	3	0	5	0	5	0	2	0	58	0
Ken O'Doherty	Republic of Ireland	DF	1+1	0	1	0	0	0	1	0	0	0	3+1	0
Iffy Onuora	Scotland	FW	38+3	8	3	2	5	2	4	1	2	1	52+3	14
Kieran O'Regan	Republic of Ireland	MF	37+2	4	3	1	5	0	5	0	2	0	52+2	5
Neil Parsley	England	DF	5	0	0	0	0	0	1	0	0	0	6	0
Iwan Roberts	Wales	FW	46	24	3	3	5	3	5	4	2	0	61	34
Frank Stapleton	Republic of Ireland	FW	5	0	1+1	1	0+1	0	1	0	0	0	7+2	1
Phil Starbuck	England	FW	42+2	14	2	0	5	3	3+1	0	2	1	54+3	18
Simon Trevitt	England	DF	41	1	3	0	5	0	4	0	2	0	55	1
Alan Walsh	England	FW	0+4	0	0+1	0	0	0	0	0	0	0	0+5	0
Mark Wright	England	DF	4+4	0	2+1	0	0	0	1+2	0	0	0	7+7	0
