= 1992–93 Mansfield Town F.C. season =

Mansfield Town
1992–93 season
- Manager: George Foster
- Stadium: Field Mill
- Second Division: 22nd
- FA Cup: First Round
- League Cup: First Round
- Football League Trophy: First Round

The 1992–93 season was Mansfield Town's 56th season in the Football League and 2nd in the Second Division they finished in 22nd position with 44 points and were relegated to the Third Division.

== Final league table ==
Pos	Team	Pld	W	D	L	GF	GA	GD	Pts	Qualification or relegation
1	Stoke City (C, P)	46	27	12	7	73	34	+39	93	Promotion to the First Division
2	Bolton Wanderers (P)	46	27	9	10	80	41	+39	90	Promotion to the First Division
3	Port Vale	46	26	11	9	79	44	+35	89	Qualification for the Second Division play-offs
4	West Bromwich Albion (O, P)	46	25	10	11	88	54	+34	85	Qualification for the Second Division play-offs
5	Swansea City	46	20	13	13	65	47	+18	73	Qualification for the Second Division play-offs
6	Stockport County	46	19	15	12	81	57	+24	72	Qualification for the Second Division play-offs
7	Leyton Orient	46	21	9	16	69	53	+16	72	
8	Reading	46	18	15	13	66	51	+15	69	
9	Brighton & Hove Albion	46	20	9	17	63	59	+4	69	
10	Bradford City	46	18	14	14	69	67	+2	68	
11	Rotherham United	46	17	14	15	60	60	0	65	
12	Fulham	46	16	17	13	57	55	+2	65	
13	Burnley	46	15	16	15	57	59	−2	61	
14	Plymouth Argyle	46	16	12	18	59	64	−5	60	
15	Huddersfield Town	46	17	9	20	54	61	−7	60	
16	Hartlepool United	46	14	12	20	42	60	−18	54	
17	Bournemouth	46	12	17	17	45	52	−7	53	
18	Blackpool	46	12	15	19	63	75	−12	51	
19	Exeter City	46	11	17	18	54	69	−15	50	
20	Hull City	46	13	11	22	46	69	−23	50	
21	Preston North End (R)	46	13	8	25	65	94	−29	47	Relegation to the Third Division
22	Mansfield Town (R)	46	11	11	24	52	80	−28	44	Relegation to the Third Division
23	Wigan Athletic (R)	46	10	11	25	43	72	−29	41	Relegation to the Third Division
24	Chester City (R)	46	8	5	33	49	102	−53	29	Relegation to the Third Division

Rules for classification: 1) Points; 2) Goals scored; 3) Goal difference
(C) Champions; (O) Play-off winners; (P) Promoted; (R) Relegated

== Results ==
=== Football League Second Division ===
Match	Date	Opponent	Venue	Result	Attendance	Scorers
1	15 August 1992	Plymouth Argyle	H	0–0	4,511	
2	22 August 1992	Swansea City	A	0–4	3,082	
3	29 August 1992	Fulham	H	2–3	3,229	Stant (2)
4	1 September 1992	Bournemouth	H	0–2	3,031	
5	5 September 1992	Blackpool	A	1–1	4,322	Castledine
6	12 September 1992	Bradford City	H	5–2	3,552	Holland, Charles, Stringfellow, Fee (2)
7	15 September 1992	Chester City	A	2–1	3,326	Fee, Stant
8	19 September 1992	Burnley	A	0–1	8,622	
9	26 September 1992	Stoke City	H	0–4	6,820	
10	3 October 1992	Wigan Athletic	A	0–2	1,644	
11	10 October 1992	Stockport County	H	2–0	3,840	Walker, Wilkinson
12	17 October 1992	Exeter City	A	0–2	2,820	
13	24 October 1992	Preston North End	H	2–2	3,047	Stant, Withe
14	31 October 1992	Rotherham United	A	0–2	5,063	
15	3 November 1992	Hull City	H	3–1	3,040	Withe, Stant, McCord
16	7 November 1992	Huddersfield Town	H	1–2	4,933	Stant
17	28 November 1992	Leyton Orient	A	1–5	4,537	Ford
18	5 December 1992	Fulham	A	0–0	3,285	
19	12 December 1992	Brighton & Hove Albion	H	1–3	2,873	Noteman
20	20 December 1992	West Bromwich Albion	A	0–2	13,134	
21	28 December 1992	Reading	H	1–1	3,043	Ford
22	2 January 1993	Bradford City	A	0–0	6,940	
23	9 January 1993	Chester City	H	2–0	2,662	Noteman, Withe
24	16 January 1993	Stoke City	A	0–4	14,619	
25	23 January 1993	Burnley	H	1–1	3,996	Charles
26	30 January 1993	Swansea City	H	3–3	2,624	Wilkinson, Holland, Stringfellow
27	6 February 1993	Plymouth Argyle	A	2–3	4,630	Wilkinson (2)
28	13 February 1993	Blackpool	H	2–2	3,593	Wilkinson, Charles
29	16 February 1993	Hartlepool United	H	2–0	2,655	Wilkinson, Stringfellow
30	20 February 1993	Bournemouth	A	1–4	3,987	Wilkinson
31	26 February 1993	Stockport County	A	1–0	5,307	Stringfellow
32	6 March 1993	Wigan Athletic	H	2–0	3,026	Wilkinson, Castledine
33	9 March 1993	Bolton Wanderers	A	1–2	6,557	Noteman
34	13 March 1993	Huddersfield Town	H	1–2	3,987	Noteman
35	20 March 1993	Hull City	A	0–1	3,551	
36	23 March 1993	Leyton Orient	H	3–0	2,776	Withe, McLoughlin (2)
37	27 March 1993	Hartlepool United	A	1–0	2,316	Castledine
38	3 April 1993	Bolton Wanderers	H	1–1	5,366	Wilkinson
39	7 April 1993	Brighton & Hove Albion	A	1–3	4,731	Wilkinson
40	10 April 1993	Port Vale	H	0–1	5,081	
41	12 April 1993	Reading	A	1–3	4,904	Fairclough
42	17 April 1993	West Bromwich Albion	H	0–3	6,659	
43	24 April 1993	Exeter City	H	0–0	2,527	
44	27 April 1993	Port Vale	A	0–3	9,996	
45	1 May 1993	Preston North End	A	5–1	5,889	Clarke, Holland, McLoughlin, Wilkinson, Stringfellow
46	8 May 1993	Rotherham United	H	1–3	3,833	McLoughlin

=== FA Cup ===
Round	Date	Opponent	Venue	Result	Attendance	Scorers
R1	14 November 1992	Shrewsbury Town	A	1–3	3,355	Fairclough

=== League Cup ===
Round	Date	Opponent	Venue	Result	Attendance	Scorers
R1 1st leg	19 August 1992	Newcastle United	A	1–2	14,083	Stant
R1 2nd leg	25 August 1992	Newcastle United	H	0–0	6,725	

=== League Trophy ===
Round	Date	Opponent	Venue	Result	Attendance	Scorers
R1	8 December 1992	Walsall	A	0–2	1,837	
R1	12 January 1993	West Bromwich Albion	H	0–1	2,356	

== Squad statistics ==
- Squad list sourced from 1992–93 Mansfield Town F.C. season at the English National Football Archive (subscription required)

Pos.	Name	League		FA Cup		League Cup		League Trophy		Total	
Pos.	Name	Apps	Goals	Apps	Goals	Apps	Goals	Apps	Goals	Apps	Goals
GK	(England) Jason Pearcey	33	0	1	0	2	0	2	0	38	0
GK	(Wales) Darren Ward	13	0	0	0	0	0	0	0	13	0
DF	(England) Nicky Clarke	9(3)	1	0	0	0	0	0	0	9(3)	1
DF	(England) Wayne Fairclough	32(1)	1	1	1	2	0	2	0	37(1)	2
DF	(England) Greg Fee	7(3)	3	0	0	0	0	0	0	7(3)	3
DF	(England) George Foster	10	0	0	0	0	0	0	0	10	0
DF	(England) Kevin Gray	31(2)	0	1	0	2	0	1(1)	0	35(3)	0
DF	(England) Simeon Hodson	17	0	0	0	0	0	0	0	17	0
DF	(England) Chris Perkins	1(4)	0	0	0	0	0	0	0	1(4)	0
DF	(England) Alan Walker	22	1	1	0	0	0	1	0	24	1
DF	(England) Chris Withe	44(1)	4	1	0	2	0	2	0	49(1)	4
MF	(Scotland) Gary Castledine	23(5)	3	1	0	1	0	1(1)	0	26(5)	3
MF	(England) Steve Charles	22(1)	3	0	0	2	0	0	0	24(1)	3
MF	(England) Paul Holland	39	3	1	0	2	0	2	0	44	3
MF	(England) Brian McCord	11	1	0	0	0	0	0	0	11	1
MF	(England) Steve Parkin	16	0	1	0	2	0	1	0	20	0
MF	(England) Dean Peer	10	0	0	0	0	0	1	0	11	0
MF	(England) Steve Spooner	12(3)	0	0	0	1	0	2	0	15(3)	0
FW	(England) Gary Ford	37	2	1	0	2	0	2	0	42	2
FW	(England) Paul McLoughlin	20(6)	4	0	0	1	0	0	0	21(6)	4
FW	(England) Kevin Noteman	15(9)	4	0	0	0	0	1(1)	0	16(9)	4
FW	(Wales) Darran Rowbotham	4	0	0	0	0	0	0	0	4	0
FW	(England) Phil Stant	17	6	1	0	2	1	0	0	20	7
FW	(England) Ian Stringfellow	26(4)	5	0	0	0	0	2	0	28(4)	5
FW	(England) Steve Wilkinson	35(8)	11	1	0	1(1)	0	2	0	39(9)	11
FW	(England) Lee Wilson	0(4)	0	0	0	0	0	0	0	0(4)	0
–	Own goals	–	0	–	0	–	0	–	0	–	0
