= List of Halifax Town A.F.C. players =

This is a list of notable footballers who have played for Halifax Town. The aim is for this list to include all players that have played 100 or more senior matches for the club. Other players who are deemed to have played an important role for the club can be included, but the reason for their notability should be included in the 'Notes' column.

For a list of all Halifax Town players with a Wikipedia article, see Category:Halifax Town A.F.C. players.

== Explanation of List ==
Players should be listed in chronological order according to the year in which they first played for the club, and then by alphabetical order of their surname. Appearances and goals should include substitute appearances, but exclude wartime matches. Further information on competitions/seasons which are regarded as eligible for appearance stats are provided below, and if any data is not available for any of these competitions an appropriate note should be added to the table.

=== League appearances ===
League appearances and goals should include data for the following league spells, but should not include play-off matches:

- Midland League: 1912-13 to 1920-21
- Football League: 1921-22 to 1992-93; 1998-99 to 2001-02
- Football Conference: 1993-94 to 1997-98; 2002–03 to 2007–08

=== Total appearances ===
The figures for total appearances and goals should include the League figures together with the following competitions:

- Play-off matches (2005–06)
- FA Cup; FA Trophy (1993-94 to 1997-98; 2002–03 to 2007–08)
- Football League Cup, Football League Trophy (including three seasons as a Conference club in 2002–03, 2003–04 and 2005–06); Football League Third Division North Cup (1933-34 to 1937-38)
- Conference League Cup (1993-94 to 1997-98; 2004–05, 2007–08); Football League Group Cup (1982–83); Watney Cup (1971–72)

== List of players ==
Please help to expand this list

Name	Position	Club career	League apps	League goals	Total apps	Total goals	Notes
Ken Ashbridge	GK	1938	0	0	1	0	
John Whalley	OL	1921-1926	?	?	?	?	'Jolly' John Whalley, One of the trickiest outside-lefts in the game
Ernie Dixon	FW	1922?-1929?	234	128	?	133	Record Halifax goalscorer
Ben Wheelhouse	DF	1923-1924, 1926?-1932?	189	4	?	?	
Edward Davies	OF	1929?-1936?	195	29	?	?	
Bill Chambers	IF	1932-1934	70	50	?	?	Player with most goals for Halifax in a single game (6)
Wattie Shirlaw	GK	1932?-1935	121	0	?	?	
William Allsop	DF	1934-1947?	242	1	?	?	
Tommy Barkas	IF	1934-1946	171	35	?	?	
Albert Valentine	FW	1934-1937	114	89	?	?	Record Halifax league goalscorer in a single season (1934/35)
David Mycock	DF	1946–1952	170	17	175	17	
Ted Breaks	DF	1948?-1955?	179	1	?	?	
Willie Watson	MF	1954–1956	33	1	?	?	Player-manager of Halifax 1954-1956; Manager 1964-1966
Phil Roscoe	DF	1956?-1964?	257	5	?	?	
Alex South	DF	1956?-1965?	302	12	?	?	
Peter Downsborough	GK	1960-1965	148	0	?	?	
Gerry Priestley	WN	1960–1963	105	23	?	?	
Willie Carlin	MF	1962–1964	95	32	?	?	
Bill Atkins	FW	1964?-1967, 1969-1973?	199	71	?	?	
Jeff Lee	DF	1964?-1973?	242	3	?	?	
John Pickering	DF	1965-1974	367	5	413	?	Record Halifax appearances
Alex Smith	GK	1967?-1976?	341	0	?	?	
Bob Wallace	MF	1967?-1972?	201	16	?	?	
Ian Lawther	FW	1968-1971	101	24	112	27	
Lammie Robertson	MF	1968?–1973?	149	20	?	?	
Tony Rhodes	DF	1970-1976?	233	9	?	?	
Fred Kemp	MF	1971–1974	111	10	?	?	
John Quinn	MF	1972–1976	92	1	?	?	Player-manager of Halifax 1974-1976
Mickey Bullock	FW	1976?-1979?	106	19	?	?	Manager of Halifax 1981-1984
Chris Dunleavy	DF	1976-1981	181	13	?	?	
Jimmy Lawson	WN	1976–1978	93	9	?	?	Player-manager of Halifax 1976-1978
Dave Evans	DF	1979?-1984?, 1990?-1992	291	10	?	?	
Mark Audin	DF	1988–1992	87	3	92	4	
Billy Ayre	DF	1980?-1982?, 1984?-1986	95	7	?	?	Manager of Halifax 1986-1990
Paul Fleming	DF	1985?-1991?	139	1	?	?	
Terry McPhillips	FW	1987-1991	93	29	?	?	
Wayne Allison	FW	1987-1989	84	23	101	30	
Nick Richardson	MF	1988–1992	101	17	?	?	
Geoff Horsfield	FW	1994, 1996-1998	83	46	?	?	Record transfer fee received (£350,000)
Kieran O'Regan	MF	1995–1998	135	7	?	?	Manager of Halifax 1998-1999
Chris Tate	FW	1999?-2000?	18	4	?	?	Record transfer fee paid (£150,000)
Chris Wilder	DF	1999-2001	51	1	58	7	Manager of Halifax 2002-2008
Lewis Killeen	FW	2002–2008	201	38	?	?	
Jon Shaw	FW	2007–2008	37	20	?	?	Top scorer and voted supporter's player of the season, 2007–08
Philip Kerr	GK	1986–1987	0	0	0	0	
