= Terry McPhillips =

English footballer and manager

Personal information
- Full name: Terence Peter McPhillips
- Date of birth: 1 October 1968 (age 58)
- Place of birth: Liverpool, England
- Position: Forward

Team information
- Current team: Oldham Athletic (head of recruitment)

Youth career
- 1987: Liverpool

Senior career*
Years	Team	Apps	(Gls)
1987–1991	Halifax Town	93	(29)
1989–1990	→ Northampton Town (loan)	15	(4)
1991–1992	Crewe Alexandra	34	(5)
1992–1993	Fleetwood Town	23	(12)
1993–1994	Barrow	29	(8)
1994	Nantwich Town	17	(3)
1994–1995	Burscough	42	(7)
1995	Marine	12	(4)
1995–1996	Ashton United	45	(10)
1996–1997	Caernarfon Town	24	(15)
1997	Bangor City	15	(3)

Managerial career
- 2018: Blackpool (caretaker)
- 2018–2019: Blackpool
- * Club domestic league appearances and goals

Terence Peter McPhillips (born 1 October 1968) is an English professional football manager and former player who played as a forward in the Football League. He is currently the Head of Recruitment of Oldham Athletic.

== Early life ==
McPhillips attended Maricourt High School.

== Professional career ==
McPhillips began his career as a forward in the youth team at Liverpool F.C. He did not make a first team appearance at Anfield and left Liverpool for Halifax Town in 1987. He scored a hat-trick for Halifax in a 3–3 draw against Carlisle United in the 1988–89 season. He went on to score 29 goals in 93 appearances for Halifax Town. In 1991, he signed for Crewe Alexandra on a free transfer, scoring once in six league appearances for Crewe. He dropped into non-league football with Fleetwood and Barrow before joining Nantwich Town in March 1994. He then served Marine, Burscough, Ashton United, Caernarfon Town and Bangor City.

== Coaching career ==
McPhillips became Academy Director at Crewe Alexandra, in 1992 and spent 14 years as a youth coach at the club before joining the Academy Staff of Blackburn Rovers in 2006. He set up the Merseyside-based TMS (Technique/Movement/Skill) football school in 1996.

He later managed the Blackburn Rovers Youth team that reached the 2012 FA Youths Cup Final, but were defeated by Chelsea. In January 2012, he was appointed caretaker assistant manager to Gary Bowyer after Henning Berg was dismissed as manager. McPhillips was re-appointed assistant manager from June 2013 to 2015.

In 2016, he followed Gary Bowyer to Blackpool F.C. as a chief scout and assistant manager. He was appointed caretaker manager of Blackpool F.C. on 6 August 2018, after Gary Bowyer left the club. On 10 September 2018, he was made permanent manager of Blackpool. McPhillips resigned as Blackpool manager on 5 July 2019, having informed the club's board that he had no long-term desire to be a manager.

In 2020 McPhillips was appointed attack coach and set piece specialist at East Bengal to work alongside manager Robbie Fowler.

On 5 October 2021 McPhillips was appointed the assistant manager at Southport.

In April 2023, he joined League One club Forest Green Rovers as Chief Scout.

== Managerial statistics ==
As of 5 July 2019

Managerial record by team and tenure
Team	From	To	Record				
Team	From	To	P	W	D	L	Win %
Blackpool	6 August 2018	5 July 2019	56	21	18	17	37.5
Total			56	21	18	17	37.5
