= Withe =

Withe is a surname. Notable people with the surname include:

- Chris Withe (born 1962), English footballer
- Jason Withe (born 1971), English footballer and manager
- Peter Withe (born 1951), English footballer and manager
