= Simon Ireland =

English footballer

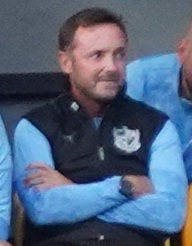
- Ireland with Port Vale (2025)

Personal information
- Full name: Simon Piers Ireland
- Date of birth: 23 November 1971 (age 54)
- Place of birth: Barnstaple, England
- Height: 5 ft 11 in (1.80 m)
- Position: Midfielder

Youth career
- Huddersfield Town

Senior career*
Years	Team	Apps	(Gls)
1990–1993	Huddersfield Town	19	(0)
1992	→ Wrexham (loan)	5	(0)
1993	Blackburn Rovers	1	(0)
1994	→ Mansfield Town (loan)	9	(1)
1994–1997	Mansfield Town	85	(11)
1996	→ Doncaster Rovers (loan)	8	(1)
1997–1998	Doncaster Rovers	51	(1)
1998–2005	Boreham Wood		
Total		178	(14)

Managerial career
- 2019: Nottingham Forest (caretaker)
- * Club domestic league appearances and goals

Simon Piers Ireland (born 23 November 1971) is an English football coach and former professional player.

Ireland played as a midfielder in the Premier League and English Football League for Huddersfield Town, Wrexham (on loan), Blackburn Rovers, Mansfield Town and Doncaster Rovers. He scored 17 goals in 207 league and cup appearances in an eight-year professional career. He later played non-League football for Boreham Wood. He entered coaching with Blackburn Rovers, working at the Academy from 2008 to 2015. He then spent 18 months at Brighton & Hove Albion and three years in the academy at Queens Park Rangers before he became a first-team coach with Nottingham Forest in January 2018. He served as caretaker manager in January 2019. He switched to Sheffield Wednesday in August 2021 before he left the club in June 2023. He returned to Huddersfield Town as a coach in September 2023 and moved on to coach at Plymouth Argyle, Port Vale, and Barrow.

== Playing career ==
Ireland came through the youth ranks at Huddersfield Town to make three starts and three substitute appearances in the Third Division during the 1990–91 season under the stewardship of Eoin Hand. He played 12 games in all competitions in the 1991–92 campaign. He spent the latter part of the season on loan at Brian Flynn's Wrexham, where he played five Fourth Division games. He departed Leeds Road early in the 1992–93 season after having scored one goal in five matches for Ian Ross's "Terriers". Ireland was sold to Blackburn Rovers for a £200,000 fee on 3 November 1992. He had impressed manager Kenny Dalglish in a League Cup game against Blackburn the previous month. He played one Premier League game for Rovers, coming on as a substitute in a 3–2 defeat at Manchester City on 30 January 1993.

On 18 March 1994, he returned to the Third Division on loan at Mansfield Town. He played nine games at Field Mill in what remained of the 1993–94 season. On 12 August 1994, he was sold to Mansfield Town for a £60,000 fee. He scored the winning goal against Leeds United in the League Cup the following month. Manager Andy King gave Ireland 50 starts and two substitute appearances in the 1994–95 campaign, with Ireland scoring seven goals. Ireland made 43 starts and two substitute appearances in the 1995–96 campaign, scoring six goals. Ireland featured nine times under new manager Steve Parkin in the early part of the 1996–97 season. Ireland joined Doncaster Rovers on loan from 18 October to 3 December 1996. On 28 January 1997, he joined Doncaster Rovers permanently for £10,000. He ended the 1996–97 season having made 25 appearances for Kerry Dixon's Rovers, scoring two goals. He played 38 games in the 1997–98 campaign as Rovers finished bottom of the Football League and then left Belle Vue. He later played for Isthmian League club Boreham Wood.

== Coaching career ==
In January 2008, Ireland was appointed assistant director, responsible for the U9-U12 age groups at Blackburn Rovers. In August 2013, he then became the U21 manager of Brighton & Hove Albion. He left Brighton in December 2014. Ireland joined Queens Park Rangers as the academy's new head of coaching and coach education in February 2015. He left on 18 January 2018 and joined the staff of Aitor Karanka at Nottingham Forest as a first-team coach a few days later. Karanka departed the club on 11 January 2019 and Ireland served as caretaker manager the following day against Reading, which ended in a 2–0 defeat. On 15 January, Martin O'Neill was appointed as the new manager and Ireland returned to work as part of the backroom staff.

In August 2021, Ireland joined Darren Moore as a first-team coach at Sheffield Wednesday. He was credited with greatly improving the Owls at set pieces. He left Sheffield Wednesday on 19 June 2023, with manager Darren Moore and the rest of his backroom staff. In September 2023, he re-united with Moore once again as part of the new coaching staff at Championship side Huddersfield Town, re-joining the Terriers after a thirty-year absence. In March 2024, he was appointed as a first-team coach at Plymouth Argyle by manager Ian Foster. He left the club when manager Wayne Rooney departed on 31 December 2024. He began coaching alongside Darren Moore at Port Vale in February 2025 after assistant manager Wayne Jacobs was forced to take a leave of absence due to ill health. He left Vale Park after 12 months in order to take up a new role closer to his home. The new role turned out to be as a member of Dino Maamria's coaching staff at Barrow, departing the club following relegation at the end of the 2025–26 season.

== Personal life ==
His son, Ben, played non-League football for Shelley.

== Career statistics ==
=== Club ===
Appearances and goals by club, season and competition
Club	Season	League			FA Cup		League Cup		Other		Total	
Club	Season	Division	Apps	Goals	Apps	Goals	Apps	Goals	Apps	Goals	Apps	Goals
Huddersfield Town	1990–91	Third Division	6	0	0	0	0	0	0	0	6	0
Huddersfield Town	1991–92	Third Division	9	0	1	0	0	0	2 (Note: Appearance(s) in Football League Trophy)	0	12	0
Huddersfield Town	1992–93	Second Division	4	0	0	0	1	1	0	0	5	1
Huddersfield Town	Total		19	0	1	0	1	1	2	0	23	1
Wrexham (loan)	1991–92	Fourth Division	5	0	—		—		—		5	0
Blackburn Rovers	1992–93	Premier League	1	0	0	0	0	0	—		1	0
Blackburn Rovers	1993–94	Premier League	0	0	0	0	0	0	—		0	0
Blackburn Rovers	Total		1	0	0	0	0	0	0	0	1	0
Mansfield Town (loan)	1993–94	Third Division	9	1	—		—		—		9	1
Mansfield Town	1994–95	Third Division	40	5	4	1	5	1	3 (Note: Appearance(s) in play-offs)	0	52	7
Mansfield Town	1995–96	Third Division	39	6	2	0	2	0	2	0	45	6
Mansfield Town	1996–97	Third Division	6	0	1	0	2	0	0	0	9	0
Mansfield Town	Total		94	12	7	1	9	1	5	0	115	14
Doncaster Rovers	1996–97	Third Division	25	2	0	0	0	0	0	0	25	2
Doncaster Rovers	1997–98	Third Division	34	0	1	0	2	0	1	0	38	0
Doncaster Rovers	Total		59	2	1	0	2	0	1	0	63	2
Career total			178	14	9	1	12	2	8	0	207	17

=== Managerial ===
Managerial record by team and tenure
Team	From	To	Record					Ref.
Team	From	To	P	W	D	L	Win %	Ref.
Nottingham Forest (caretaker)	11 January 2019	15 January 2019	1	0	0	1	0.00	
Total			1	0	0	1	0.00	
