= O'Neill Donaldson =

English footballer

Personal information
- Full name: O'Neill McKay Donaldson
- Date of birth: 24 November 1969 (age 56)
- Place of birth: Birmingham, England
- Position: Striker

Senior career*
Years	Team	Apps	(Gls)
1990–1991	Hinckley United		
1991–1994	Shrewsbury Town	28	(4)
1994–1995	Doncaster Rovers	9	(2)
1994	→ Mansfield Town (loan)	4	(6)
1995–1998	Sheffield Wednesday	14	(3)
1998	→ Oxford United (loan)	6	(2)
1998	Stoke City	2	(0)
1998–2001	Torquay United	27	(1)
2001	Halesowen Town		
Total		90	(18)
- * Club domestic league appearances and goals

O'Neill McKay Donaldson (born 24 November 1969) is an English former professional footballer who played as a striker.

He notably played in the Premier League for Sheffield Wednesday, as well as in the Football League with Shrewsbury Town, Doncaster Rovers, Mansfield Town, Oxford United, Stoke City and Torquay United. He also started and finished his playing career in non-league with Hinckley United and Halesowen Town respectively.

== Career ==
Donaldson began his career at non-league Hinckley United where his form attracted the attention of English Football League scouts, leading to him ultimately signing for Shrewsbury Town in November 1991. Donaldson did not gain a regular first team spot at the club, most often appearing as a substitute and was given a free transfer to Doncaster Rovers in 1994. Although he did not gain a regular first team place at Rovers either, Donaldson's reputation grew from a brief but goal-heavy spell on loan at Mansfield Town and it was his form at that club which convinced Sheffield Wednesday to sign him for £50,000.

Donaldson made his debut for the Owls as a sub against Manchester City on 18 March 1995. However, he quickly faded from the first team picture at a time when Wednesday boasted the likes of Mark Bright and David Hirst up front and Donaldson was forced to settle for a reserve role at the Hillsborough club. He largely impressed during a loan spell at Oxford United, although then manager Malcolm Shotton blamed the player's agent for blocking a deal that would have brought Donaldson to the Manor Ground on a permanent basis. Indeed, such was the desire to see Donaldson remain at the club full-time that a local fanzine editor even wrote to the player in an attempt to convince him to reconsider.

Ultimately Donaldson was released by Wednesday in March 1998 for a frustrating two-month spell at Stoke City, before he spent a further three years at Torquay United where injury and a lack of form once again denied him a regular first team place. He left the league in 2001 for a brief spell at Halesowen Town in the Western Division of the Southern Football League before retiring from football.

== Career statistics ==
Appearances and goals by club, season and competition
Club	Season	League			FA Cup		League Cup		Other		Total	
Club	Season	Division	Apps	Goals	Apps	Goals	Apps	Goals	Apps	Goals	Apps	Goals
Shrewsbury Town	1991–92	Third Division	19	2	0	0	0	0	1 (Note: Appearances in Football League Trophy)	0	20	2
Shrewsbury Town	1992–93	Fourth Division	0	0	0	0	0	0	0	0	0	0
Shrewsbury Town	1993–94	Third Division	9	2	0	0	0	0	0	0	9	2
Shrewsbury Town	Total		28	4	0	0	0	0	1	0	29	4
Doncaster Rovers	1994–95	Third Division	9	2	0	0	2	0	1	0	12	2
Mansfield Town (loan)	1994–95	Third Division	4	6	1	1	0	0	0	0	5	7
Sheffield Wednesday	1994–95	Premier League	1	0	0	0	0	0	—		1	0
Sheffield Wednesday	1995–96	Premier League	3	1	0	0	0	0	—		3	1
Sheffield Wednesday	1996–97	Premier League	5	2	0	0	0	0	—		5	2
Sheffield Wednesday	1997–98	Premier League	5	0	0	0	0	0	—		5	0
Sheffield Wednesday	Total		14	3	0	0	0	0	—		14	3
Oxford United (loan)	1997–98	First Division	6	2	0	0	0	0	—		6	2
Stoke City	1997–98	First Division	2	0	0	0	0	0	—		2	0
Torquay United	1998–99	Third Division	12	1	0	0	0	0	0	0	12	1
Torquay United	1999–2000	Third Division	15	0	3	1	0	0	2	1	20	2
Torquay United	Total		27	1	3	1	0	0	2	1	32	3
Career total			90	18	4	2	2	0	4	1	100	21
