= 1994–95 Sheffield Wednesday F.C. season =

English football club season

Sheffield Wednesday
1994–95 season
- Chairman: Dave Richards
- Manager: Trevor Francis
- Premiership: 13th
- FA Cup: Fourth round
- League Cup: Fourth round
- Top goalscorer: League: Bright (11); All: Bright (13)
- Highest home attendance: 34,051 vs Tottenham Hotspur (20 Aug 1994, Premier League)
- Lowest home attendance: 15,705 vs Bradford City (21 Sep 1994, League Cup)
- Average home league attendance: 26,572 (league only)

The 1994–95 season was Sheffield Wednesday F.C.'s 128th season. They competed in the twenty-two team Premiership, the top tier of English football, finishing thirteenth.

== Season summary ==
Sheffield Wednesday were among the pre-season favourites for a UEFA Cup places, having finished seventh in the first two Premiership seasons, third in the last First Division season in 1992 and winning the League Cup in 1991, with many fine players still on the club's payroll. But they were still without striker David Hirst for much of the season due to injury, and this played at least some part in the Owls enduring their worst league form since relegation in 1990.

Right up till early May, the Owls were in real danger of relegation and this was enough for the club's board, who wielded the axe on manager Trevor Francis after four years in charge. His successor was the former Luton Town and Tottenham Hotspur manager David Pleat, who looked to the continent in hope of returning the Owls to their winning ways and brought in Belgian forward Marc Degryse.

== Final league table ==
Pos	Team	Pld	W	D	L	GF	GA	GD	Pts	Qualification or relegation
11	Chelsea	42	13	15	14	50	55	−5	54	
12	Arsenal	42	13	12	17	52	49	+3	51	
13	Sheffield Wednesday	42	13	12	17	49	57	−8	51	Qualification for the Intertoto Cup group stage
14	West Ham United	42	13	11	18	44	48	−4	50	
15	Everton	42	11	17	14	44	51	−7	50	Qualification for the Cup Winners' Cup first round (Note: Everton qualified for the Cup Winners' Cup as FA Cup winners.)

Source: Premier League
Rules for classification: 1) points; 2) goal difference; 3) number of goals scored.
Notes:

Results summary

Overall								Home						Away					
Pld	W	D	L	GF	GA	GD	Pts	W	D	L	GF	GA	GD	W	D	L	GF	GA	GD
42	13	12	17	49	57	−8	51	7	7	7	26	26	0	6	5	10	23	31	−8

Source: Statto

Results by round

Round	1	2	3	4	5	6	7	8	9	10	11	12	13	14	15	16	17	18	19	20	21	22	23	24	25	26	27	28	29	30	31	32	33	34	35	36	37	38	39	40	41	42
Ground	H	A	A	H	A	H	H	A	H	A	A	H	H	A	H	A	H	A	H	A	H	A	H	A	H	A	H	A	H	H	A	A	H	A	A	H	H	A	H	A	A	H
Result	L	L	W	D	L	D	D	L	W	W	L	D	L	D	W	D	W	L	L	W	W	W	D	D	D	W	W	L	L	L	W	D	L	L	L	L	W	L	D	D	L	W
Position	17	21	14	12	15	16	17	18	16	13	14	15	17	16	16	15	14	14	18	15	13	9	10	10	9	7	8	8	8	9	8	8	8	8	9	11	10	11	13	14	14	13

Source: Statto.com
A = Away; H = Home; W = Win; D = Draw; L = Loss

== Results ==
Sheffield Wednesday's score comes first

=== Legend ===
Win	Draw	Loss

=== FA Premier League ===
Date	Opponent	Venue	Result	Attendance	Scorers
20 August 1994	Tottenham Hotspur	H	3–4	34,051	Hirst, Calderwood (own goal), Petrescu
24 August 1994	Queens Park Rangers	A	2–3	12,788	Sheridan, Hyde
27 August 1994	Wimbledon	A	1–0	7,453	Watson
31 August 1994	Norwich City	H	0–0	25,072	
10 September 1994	Nottingham Forest	A	1–4	22,022	Hyde
17 September 1994	Manchester City	H	1–1	26,776	Watson
26 September 1994	Leeds United	H	1–1	23,227	Bright
1 October 1994	Liverpool	A	1–4	31,493	Nolan
8 October 1994	Manchester United	H	1–0	33,441	Hirst
16 October 1994	Ipswich Town	A	2–1	13,073	Bright, Hirst
22 October 1994	Newcastle United	A	1–2	34,408	Taylor
29 October 1994	Chelsea	H	1–1	25,450	Bright
2 November 1994	Blackburn Rovers	H	0–1	24,207	
6 November 1994	Arsenal	A	0–0	33,705	
19 November 1994	West Ham United	H	1–0	25,300	Petrescu
27 November 1994	Aston Villa	A	1–1	25,082	Atherton
3 December 1994	Crystal Palace	H	1–0	21,930	Bart-Williams
10 December 1994	Tottenham Hotspur	A	1–3	25,912	Nolan
17 December 1994	Queens Park Rangers	H	0–2	22,766	
26 December 1994	Everton	A	4–1	37,080	Bright, Whittingham (2), Ingesson
28 December 1994	Coventry City	H	5–1	26,056	Bright (2), Waddle, Whittingham (2)
31 December 1994	Leicester City	A	1–0	20,624	Hyde
2 January 1995	Southampton	H	1–1	28,424	Hyde
14 January 1995	Chelsea	A	1–1	17,285	Nolan
21 January 1995	Newcastle United	H	0–0	31,215	
23 January 1995	West Ham United	A	2–0	14,554	Waddle, Bright
4 February 1995	Arsenal	H	3–1	23,468	Petrescu, Ingesson, Bright
12 February 1995	Blackburn Rovers	A	1–3	22,223	Waddle
18 February 1995	Aston Villa	H	1–2	24,063	Bright
25 February 1995	Liverpool	H	1–2	31,964	Bart-Williams
4 March 1995	Leeds United	A	1–0	33,750	Waddle
8 March 1995	Norwich City	A	0–0	13,530	
11 March 1995	Wimbledon	H	0–1	20,395	
14 March 1995	Crystal Palace	A	1–2	10,422	Whittingham
18 March 1995	Manchester City	A	2–3	23,355	Hyde, Whittingham
1 April 1995	Nottingham Forest	H	1–7	30,060	Bright (pen)
8 April 1995	Leicester City	H	1–0	22,551	Whittingham
15 April 1995	Coventry City	A	0–2	15,710	
17 April 1995	Everton	H	0–0	27,880	
29 April 1995	Southampton	A	0–0	15,189	
7 May 1995	Manchester United	A	0–1	43,868	
14 May 1995	Ipswich Town	H	4–1	30,213	Whittingham (2), Bart-Williams, Bright

=== FA Cup ===
Round	Date	Opponent	Venue	Result	Attendance	Goalscorers
R3	7 January 1995	Gillingham	A	2–1	10,425	Waddle, Bright
R4	30 January 1995	Wolverhampton Wanderers	H	0–0	21,757	
R4R	8 February 1995	Wolverhampton Wanderers	A	1–1 (lost 3–4 on pens)	28,544	Bright

=== League Cup ===
Round	Date	Opponent	Venue	Result	Attendance	Goalscorers
R2 1st Leg	21 September 1994	Bradford City	H	2–1	15,705	Taylor, Hyde
R2 2nd Leg	4 October 1994	Bradford City	A	1–1 (won 3–2 on agg)	13,092	Bart-Williams
R3	26 October 1994	Southampton	H	1–0	16,715	Bart-Williams
R4	30 November 1994	Arsenal	A	0–2	27,390	

== Players ==
=== First-team squad ===
Squad at end of season

Note: Flags indicate national team as defined under FIFA eligibility rules; some limited exceptions apply. Players may hold more than one non-FIFA nationality.

No.	Pos.	Nation	Player
1	GK	ENG	Chris Woods
2	DF	ENG	Peter Atherton
3	DF	ENG	Ian Nolan (Note: Nolan was born in Liverpool, England, but also qualified to represent Northern Ireland internationally and made his international debut for Northern Ireland in 1996.)
5	DF	ROU	Dan Petrescu
6	DF	ENG	Brian Linighan
7	MF	AUS	Adem Poric (Note: Poric was born in London, England, but also qualified to represent Australia internationally and represented them at U-20 level.)
8	MF	ENG	Chris Waddle
9	FW	ENG	David Hirst
10	FW	ENG	Mark Bright
11	MF	IRL	John Sheridan (Note: Sheridan was born in Stretford, England, but also qualified to represent the Republic of Ireland internationally and represented them at U-21 level before making his international debut for the Republic of Ireland in 1988.)
12	DF	ENG	Andy Pearce
13	GK	ENG	Kevin Pressman
14	MF	ENG	Chris Bart-Williams (Note: Bart-Williams was born in Freetown, Sierra Leone, but was raised in England and represented them at U-21 and B level.)
15	MF	ENG	Andy Sinton

No.	Pos.	Nation	Player
16	MF	ENG	Graham Hyde
17	DF	ENG	Des Walker
18	MF	SWE	Klas Ingesson
19	FW	ENG	Guy Whittingham
21	MF	WAL	Ryan Jones (Note: Jones was born in Sheffield, England, but also qualified to represent Wales internationally and made his international debut for Wales in May 1994.)
22	DF	ENG	Simon Stewart
23	GK	ENG	Lance Key
24	DF	ENG	Julian Watts
25	MF	ENG	Mike Williams
26	FW	ENG	Trevor Francis (player-manager)
27	FW	ENG	O'Neill Donaldson
29	DF	ENG	Lee Briscoe
30	MF	ENG	Matthew Hardwick

=== Left club during season ===
Note: Flags indicate national team as defined under FIFA eligibility rules; some limited exceptions apply. Players may hold more than one non-FIFA nationality.

No.	Pos.	Nation	Player
4	MF	ENG	Ian Taylor (to Aston Villa)
19	FW	ENG	Nigel Jemson (to Notts County)

No.	Pos.	Nation	Player
20	FW	ENG	Gordon Watson (to Southampton)
28	DF	ENG	Simon Coleman (to Bolton Wanderers)

=== Reserve squad ===
Note: Flags indicate national team as defined under FIFA eligibility rules; some limited exceptions apply. Players may hold more than one non-FIFA nationality.

No.	Pos.	Nation	Player
—	DF	ENG	David Faulkner
—	MF	ENG	Darren Holmes

No.	Pos.	Nation	Player
—	FW	ENG	Richie Barker
—	FW	ENG	Leroy Chambers

== Transfers ==
=== In ===
Date	Pos	Name	From	Fee
1 June 1994	DF	Peter Atherton	Coventry City	£800,000
12 July 1994	MF	Ian Taylor	Port Vale	£1,000,000
6 August 1994	DF	Dan Petrescu	Genoa	£1,300,000
17 August 1994	DF	Ian Nolan	Tranmere Rovers	£1,500,000
1 September 1994	MF	Klas Ingesson	PSV Eindhoven	£800,000
21 December 1994	FW	Guy Whittingham	Aston Villa	£700,000
9 January 1995	FW	O'Neill Donaldson	Mansfield Town	£50,000

=== Out ===
Date	Pos	Name	To	Fee
30 June 1994	MF	Carlton Palmer	Leeds United	£2,600,000
4 July 1994	DF	Nigel Worthington	Leeds United	£325,000
19 July 1994	DF	Nigel Pearson	Middlesbrough	£500,000
1 August 1994	DF	Phil King	Aston Villa	£200,000
12 August 1994	FW	Leroy Chambers	Chester City	Free transfer
8 September 1994	FW	Nigel Jemson	Notts County	£300,000
5 October 1994	DF	Simon Coleman	Bolton Wanderers	£350,000
21 December 1994	MF	Ian Taylor	Aston Villa	£1,000,000
17 March 1995	FW	Gordon Watson	Southampton	£1,200,000

Transfers in: ▼£6,150,000
Transfers out: ▲£6,475,000
Total spending: ▲£325,000
