= Colin Hoyle =

English footballer

Personal information
- Date of birth: 15 January 1972 (age 54)
- Place of birth: Derby, England
- Height: 5 ft 11 in (1.80 m)
- Position: Defender

Team information
- Current team: Mickleover Sports

Youth career
- 1990: Arsenal

Senior career*
Years	Team	Apps	(Gls)
1990	Arsenal	0	(0)
1990	→ Chesterfield (loan)	3	(0)
1990–1992	Barnsley	?	(?)
1992–1994	Bradford City	59	(1)
1994–1996	Notts County	5	(0)
1994	→ Mansfield Town (loan)	6	(0)
1997–1999	King's Lynn	1	(0)
1999–2001	Boston United	26	(1)
2001–2003	Burton Albion	31	(0)
2003	→ Nuneaton Borough (loan)	0	(0)
2003–2004	Halifax Town	0	(0)
2003–2004	→ Burton Albion (loan)	1	(0)
2004	→ Dagenham & Redbridge (loan)	1	(0)
2004	→ Burton Albion (loan)	11	(0)
2004	Burton Albion	0	(0)
2004–2005	Worcester City	?	(?)
2005–2006	Ilkeston Town	?	(?)
2006–2007	Gresley Rovers	37	(0)
- * Club domestic league appearances and goals as of 23:54, 1 February 2008 (UTC)

Colin Hoyle (born 15 January 1972) is an English former professional footballer.

He started out at Arsenal, but never made a first-team appearance. After a loan spell at Chesterfield, he played for Barnsley, Bradford City, Notts County, Mansfield Town (loan), King's Lynn, Boston United, Burton Albion, Nuneaton Borough (loan), Halifax Town, Burton Albion (loan), Dagenham & Redbridge (loan), Burton Albion (loan), Burton Albion, Worcester City, Ilkeston Town and Gresley Rovers. He now is the assistant manager and 1st team coach at non-league Mickleover Sports.
