= Tony Elliott (footballer) =

English footballer (born 1969)

Personal information
- Full name: Anthony Robert Elliott
- Date of birth: 30 November 1969 (age 56)
- Place of birth: Nuneaton, England
- Position: Goalkeeper

Team information
- Current team: England national futsal team (goalkeeping coach) Birmingham City Women (assistant head coach)

Youth career
- Birmingham City

Senior career*
Years	Team	Apps	(Gls)
1986–1988	Birmingham City	0	(0)
1988–1992	Hereford United	75	(0)
1992–1993	Huddersfield Town	15	(0)
1993–1996	Carlisle United	22	(0)
1996–1997	Cardiff City	39	(0)
1997–1999	Scarborough	35	(0)
- * Club domestic league appearances and goals

Anthony Robert Elliott (born 30 November 1969) is an English former professional footballer who made 186 appearances in the Football League, playing as a goalkeeper for Hereford United, Huddersfield Town, Carlisle United, Cardiff City and Scarborough. In 2010, he joined Darlington as goalkeeping coach, and has since followed Tommy Cassidy, to whom he was assistant at Workington and Blue Star, to Whitby Town.

Since retiring as a player, Elliott has opened a goalkeeping school in the Cumbria area, and has worked with (among others) Carlisle United, Carlisle City, the Liverpool F.C. Academy and the England national futsal team goalkeepers. He has also been assistant manager of Workington of the Conference North and Newcastle Blue Star of the Northern Premier League Division One North.

In August 2010 he joined Darlington of the Conference National as goalkeeping coach.

He is currently Assistant Head Coach at Birmingham City Women, having taken the role in July 2021 when the since-departed Scott Booth was appointed as Head Coach.]

Tony won the CP World Cup in Atlanta, Georgia with the England National Team in October 2026.

== Honours ==
Carlisle United

- Football League Trophy runner-up: 1994–95
