= Brendan Aspinall =

English footballer

Personal information
- Full name: Brendan James Aspinall
- Date of birth: 22 July 1975 (age 51)
- Place of birth: Johannesburg, South Africa
- Position: Defender

Senior career*
Years	Team	Apps	(Gls)
1993–1994	Huddersfield Town	0	(0)
1994–1995	Mansfield Town	20	(0)
1995–1999	Coleraine	93	(2)
1999-2001	Hyde United	36	(5)
Total		149	(7)
- * Club domestic league appearances and goals

Brendan James Aspinall (born 22 July 1975) is a South African former professional footballer who played in the Football League for Mansfield Town.
