= Thomas Mooney (footballer) =

Northern Irish footballer

Tom Mooney
Personal information
- Full name: Thomas Mooney
- Date of birth: 14 December 1973 (age 52)
- Place of birth: Newry, Northern Ireland
- Position: Midfielder

Senior career*
Years	Team	Apps	(Gls)
1992–1993	Huddersfield Town	1	(0)
- Ballymena United
- * Club domestic league appearances and goals

Thomas Mooney (born 14 December 1973) is a former professional footballer who played for Huddersfield Town and Ballymena United.
