= Brian McCord =

English footballer

Personal information
- Full name: Brian John McCord
- Date of birth: 24 August 1968 (age 58)
- Place of birth: Derby, England
- Position: Midfielder

Senior career*
Years	Team	Apps	(Gls)
1987–1990	Derby County	5	(0)
1989–1990	→ Barnsley (loan)	5	(0)
1990–1992	Barnsley	38	(2)
1992	→ Mansfield Town (loan)	11	(1)
1992–1993	Stockport County	8	(1)
1997	Notts County	0	(0)
1997–1998	Stalybridge Celtic		
1998	Leek Town		
1998	Telford United		
1998	Leek Town		
1999	Barrow		
1999	Gainsborough Trinity		
Total		67	(3)
- * Club domestic league appearances and goals

Brian John McCord (born 24 August 1968) is an English former professional footballer who played in the Football League for Barnsley, Derby County, Mansfield Town and Stockport County. McCord was awarded £250,000 by the high court after he suffered a horrific leg injury in March 1993 whilst playing for Stockport County in a match against Swansea City. The watching Coventry City manager Bobby Gould described John Cornforth's challenge on McCord as "one of the worst tackles I have ever seen".
