= Peter Jackson (footballer, born 1961) =

English football player and manager (born 1961)

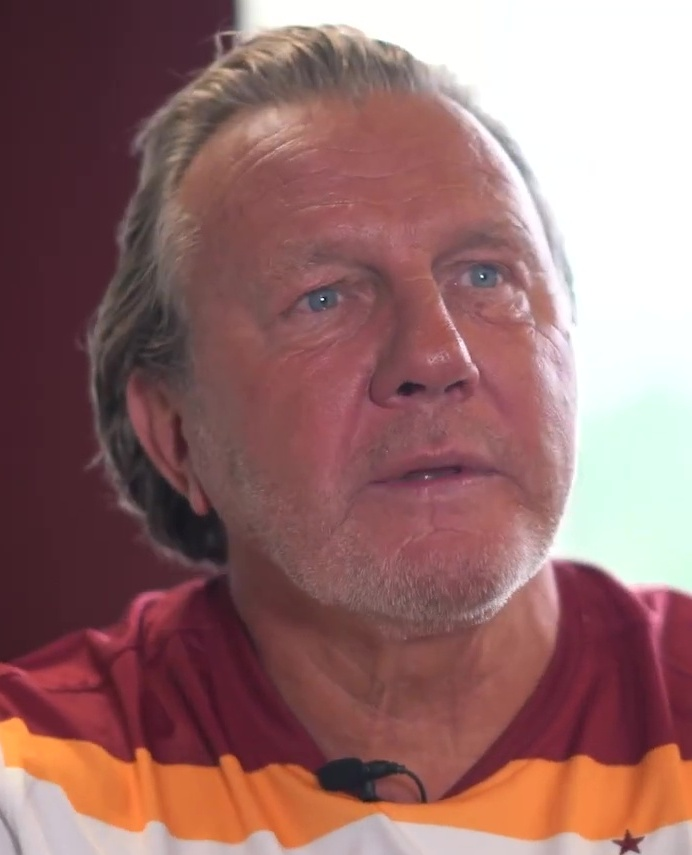
- Jackson in 2021

Personal information
- Full name: Peter Allan Jackson
- Date of birth: 6 April 1961 (age 65)
- Place of birth: Bradford, England
- Height: 6 ft 1 in (1.85 m)
- Position: Defender

Senior career*
Years	Team	Apps	(Gls)
1979–1986	Bradford City	278	(24)
1986–1988	Newcastle United	60	(3)
1988–1990	Bradford City	58	(5)
1990–1994	Huddersfield Town	155	(3)
1994–1997	Chester City	100	(3)
1997	Halifax Town	8	(0)
Total		659	(38)

Managerial career
- 1997–1999: Huddersfield Town
- 2003–2007: Huddersfield Town
- 2007–2009: Lincoln City
- 2011: Bradford City
- * Club domestic league appearances and goals

Peter Allan Jackson (born 6 April 1961) is a football manager and former player. He has previously had two spells as Huddersfield Town manager, whom he helped win the Division Three play-off in 2004, and he has also managed Lincoln City, before taking charge at his former playing club Bradford City in 2011.

As a player, Jackson started his career with his hometown club Bradford City, where as the club's youngest ever captain, he lifted the Third Division title in 1985 on the day of the Bradford City stadium fire. He moved to top flight side Newcastle United before he returned to Bradford City. He played more than 300 games in total for City, before moving to Huddersfield Town and Chester City. He amassed a century of games for both of those before finishing his career with Halifax Town.

== Playing career ==
Jackson was born in Bradford, England. He played as a central defender for Bradford City, Newcastle United, Huddersfield Town, Chester City and Halifax Town, enjoying a strong rapport with most supporters and often was club captain.

In May 1985, Jackson collected the Division Three championship with Bradford City, but his day was to turn into a nightmare when 56 spectators were killed in a horrendous stand fire while playing Lincoln City. Jackson was a regular at funerals of spectators in the weeks that followed.

Jackson moved to Huddersfield Town in 1990. He became club-captain under Eoin Hand, Ian Ross and Neil Warnock, he was Reserve Team Coach, along with Kevin Blackwell, in 1993 at Huddersfield until the end of the 1993–94 season. He became a fans' favourite at Huddersfield Town and was included as such in the 2006 book "100 Fans' Favourites" written by Alisdair Straughan and published by Huddersfield Town for their Centenary.

He left Huddersfield for Chester in 1994 and briefly played for non-league Halifax Town in 1997.

== Managerial career ==
=== Huddersfield Town ===
Jackson returned to Huddersfield Town when they gave him the opportunity to become manager in October 1997 replacing Brian Horton, after spending a few weeks playing for neighbours Halifax Town and putting them on course for a return to the Football League. He was assisted at Huddersfield by former Welsh manager Terry Yorath. In his first two seasons in charge he helped Town avoid relegation, and helped them to 10th place in Division One. However, he was controversially sacked by owner Barry Rubery in 1999 to make way for Steve Bruce.

=== Return to Huddersfield Town ===
In 2003, Jackson was re-appointed manager of a Huddersfield Town that had slid down to Division Three and were emerging from administration. In the 2003–04 season, Jackson put his faith in a squad containing promising young players. Town finished fourth to gain a place in the play-offs. Town eventually beat Mansfield Town on penalties in the play-off final to be promoted in Jackson's first season back. The 2004–05 season saw Town finish ninth, just missing out the play-off places for promotion to the Championship. Town had a great start to the 2005–06 campaign with Jackson winning Manager of the Month for August 2005 and after eventually finishing fourth and making the League One Play-Offs, they lost 3–2 to Barnsley on aggregate. On 18 May 2006, he signed a two-year extension to his contract that would have seen him managing the club until 2009.

Jackson was sent to the stands on 12 August 2006 after grabbing Bristol City's Lee Johnson around the throat in a touchline altercation 10 minutes from time in Huddersfield's 2–1 win over Bristol City. On 30 August 2006, it was announced that the Football Association would charge Jackson over the incident and Jackson said he would appeal against the charge. He lost the appeal, but was forced to pay £300, rather than serve a touchline ban.

On 6 March 2007, Jackson left Huddersfield with his contract cancelled by mutual consent. Jackson's last game in charge was a 5–1 defeat to Nottingham Forest on 3 March 2007. A statement from the board said: "The Board's clearly stated minimum aim at the start of the season was to achieve a Play-Off position, but unfortunately due to our form and the inability to attract key players, this objective is now looking remote."

=== Lincoln City ===
On 30 October 2007, Jackson was appointed as manager of League Two side Lincoln City who were bottom of the Football League. His first game in charge ended in a 1–0 home defeat to former club Chester City three days later, when he had a disagreement with the referee at the final whistle resulting in a touchline ban. In February 2008, he was diagnosed with throat cancer and announced that his treatment would commence in March. Lincoln won five of their six games in February to lift them clear of the relegation places and Jackson was named the League Two manager of the month. He was presented with his award in his final game before beginning treatment, when his side defeated Wycombe Wanderers 1–0 to lift them up to 14th in the table. In his absence, Lincoln were managed by Jackson's assistant Iffy Onuora, with assistance from Youth Team Coach Grant Brown. In June 2008, Jackson's doctors told him the treatment had been a success, but he will need regular check-ups until 2013, to ensure he does not relapse.

He returned to action and in January 2009 signed a new contract with Lincoln to keep him at the club until 2011.

After a 1–0 loss in a Football League Trophy game to Darlington on 1 September 2009, Lincoln City parted company with Peter Jackson along with assistant Iffy Onoura. The Lincoln board cited the club's poor home form over the previous season and poor start to the present season as reasons for their decision. Jackson applied to succeed his former teammate Stuart McCall at Bradford City, the club where he started his career. He was shortlisted for the vacancy but the board appointed Peter Taylor instead of Jackson.

In March 2010, he joined his wife Alison, as a director of home care franchise Caremark Calderdale which provides care at home for elderly and disabled people as well as people with terminal illnesses across Calderdale. The couple will run the franchise from the Elsie Whiteley Innovation Centre, Halifax.

=== Bradford City ===
In February 2011, Jackson was appointed as the interim manager of former club Bradford City, on a week-to-week basis, with David Wetherall as his assistant, following the departure of Peter Taylor. Jackson later announced that his permanent assistant would be former Middlesbrough FC assistant manager, Colin Cooper. During the summer, Jackson was given the position of permanent manager on a one-year contract for the 2011–12 season. Cooper also signed a one-year contract to continue as Jackson's assistant. On 25 August 2011, Jackson offered his resignation to the club after a, "poor start to the season", and it was accepted.

== Managerial statistics ==
As of match played 25 August 2011

Managerial record by team and tenure
Team	From	To	Record					Ref
Team	From	To	P	W	D	L	Win %	Ref
Huddersfield Town	7 October 1997	10 May 1999	94	33	27	34	35.1	
Huddersfield Town	27 June 2003	6 March 2007	198	81	52	65	40.9	
Lincoln City	30 October 2007	2 September 2009	92	32	21	39	34.8	
Bradford City	27 February 2011	25 August 2011	19	4	4	11	21.1	
Total			403	150	104	149	37.2	

== Honours ==
=== As a player ===
Bradford City

- Football League Third Division: 1984–85

=== As a manager ===
Huddersfield Town

- Football League Third Division play-offs: 2004

Individual

- Football League One Manager of the Month: August 2005
- Football League Two Manager of the Month: February 2008, October 2008
