= Warren Hackett =

English-born Saint Lucian footballer

Personal information
- Full name: Warren James Hackett
- Date of birth: 16 December 1971 (age 54)
- Place of birth: Plaistow, London, England
- Height: 6 ft 0 in (1.83 m)
- Position: Defender

Youth career
- Tottenham Hotspur

Senior career*
Years	Team	Apps	(Gls)
1988–1990	Tottenham Hotspur	0	(0)
1990–1994	Leyton Orient	76	(3)
1994–1995	Doncaster Rovers	46	(2)
1995–1999	Mansfield Town	117	(5)
1999–2001	Barnet	41	(1)
2001–2002	Harrow Borough		
2001–2002	Grays Athletic		
2002–2003	Ford United		
2002–2003	Chesham United	4	(1)
2003–2004	Waltham Forest	9	(0)

International career
	Saint Lucia	21	(2)

Managerial career
- 2015: Dagenham & Redbridge (caretaker)
- * Club domestic league appearances and goals

Warren Hackett (born 16 December 1971) is a former professional footballer who played as an international for Saint Lucia. A defender, primarily a left-back, he began his career with Tottenham Hotspur and was part of the 1990 winning FA Youth Cup side, but was released without breaking into the first-team, having spells with Leyton Orient, Doncaster, Mansfield and Barnet.

After retirement from the football league due to injury, Hackett played for two seasons in non-League football before going into coaching where he was assistant manager at Waltham Forest, Fisher Athletic and Erith & Belvedere.

He then moved to Toronto, Ontario, Canada to further his coaching career and worked for Glen Shields Soccer Club as an Academy Director. He returned to England and was the Academy manager / Centre Of Excellence Manager at Dagenham & Redbridge. Hackett was promoted to first-team assistant manager, along with Darren Currie, in February 2013 when his former Leyton Orient team-mate Wayne Burnett took over as manager of Dagenham.

In December 2015, following the sacking of manager Burnett, Hackett and Currie became caretaker managers of Dagenham & Redbridge losing their first game in charge, on 26 December, 3–0 at home to Cambridge United.

== Managerial statistics ==
As of match played 28 December 2015

Managerial record by team and tenure
Team	From	To	Record					Ref.
Team	From	To	P	W	D	L	Win %	Ref.
Dagenham & Redbridge (caretaker)	21 December 2015	31 December 2015	2	1	0	1	50.0	
Total			2	1	0	1	50.0	—
