= Ian Robinson (footballer) =

English footballer

Personal information
- Full name: Ian Brendan Robinson
- Date of birth: 25 August 1978 (age 48)
- Place of birth: Nottingham, England
- Position: Midfielder

Senior career*
Years	Team	Apps	(Gls)
1995–1997	Mansfield Town	17	(1)
1997–1999	Ilkeston Town		
1999–2004	Hednesford Town		
2000	→ Northwich Victoria (loan)		
2004	Alfreton Town		
2005	Worksop Town		
2006	Grantham Town		
2007	Hucknall Town		
Total		17	(1)
- * Club domestic league appearances and goals

Ian Brendan Robinson (born 25 August 1978) is an English former professional footballer who played in the Football League for Mansfield Town.
