= Chris Kerry =

English footballer

Personal information
- Full name: Christopher Brian Kerry
- Date of birth: 15 April 1976 (age 50)
- Place of birth: Chesterfield, England
- Position: Forward

Senior career*
Years	Team	Apps	(Gls)
1993–1994	Mansfield Town	2	(0)
Total		2	(0)
- * Club domestic league appearances and goals

Christopher Brian Kerry (born 15 April 1976) is an English former professional footballer who played in the Football League for Mansfield Town.
