= Simeon Hodson =

English footballer (born 1966)

Personal information
- Full name: Simeon Paul Hodson
- Date of birth: 5 March 1966 (age 60)
- Place of birth: Lincoln, England
- Height: 5 ft 9 in (1.75 m)
- Position: Defender

Youth career
- 1982–1984: Notts County

Senior career*
Years	Team	Apps	(Gls)
1983–1985	Notts County	27	(0)
1984–1985	Charlton Athletic	5	(0)
1985–1986	Lincoln United		
1985–1987	Lincoln City	56	(0)
1987–1988	Newport County	34	(1)
1987–1993	West Bromwich Albion	83	(0)
1992–1993	Doncaster Rovers	15	(0)
1992–1993	Kidderminster Harriers	6	(0)
1992–1993	Mansfield Town	17	(0)
1993–1997	Kidderminster Harriers	125	(0)
1996–1998	Rushden & Diamonds	25	(0)
1997–1999	Telford United	26	(0)
1998–2000	Altrincham	68	(0)
2000–2001	Sutton Coldfield Town		

International career
1994	England C	3	(0)
- * Club domestic league appearances and goals

Simeon Paul Hodson (born 5 March 1966) is an English former professional footballer who made 237 appearances in the Football League, principally for his hometown team Lincoln City and for West Bromwich Albion, before moving into the non-league ranks. He spent a number of seasons playing in the Football Conference, making a total of 216 league appearances at this level. He was the captain of the champions Kidderminster Harriers in 1993–94 and also represented the England semi-professional football team. He retired in the summer of 2001 with a knee injury.

== Sutton Coldfield Town ==
Following the relegation of Altrincham from the Football Conference into the Northern Premier League, the increased travelling commitments required of the Tamworth-based Hodson meant he looked for a team close to home, spending pre-season with both Rugby United and Sutton Coldfield Town before agreeing a deal with the latter. He debuted in the 2–1 Southern Football League Western Division defeat to Evesham United on 19 August with his final appearance being the 2–1 home defeat to Mangotsfield United on 5 May 2001. He was forced to retire in the summer of 2001 due to knee problems that would not be improved with surgery.

== Relegations ==
Simeon was known as something of a football Jonah during his career due to the number of relegations he suffered . He has been involved in teams relegated from the top five levels of the English football league system. In his debut season, 1983–84, he was part of the Notts County team relegated from the First Division. In 1990–91 he was part of the West Bromwich Albion team relegated from the Second Division. His two seasons, 1985–86 and 1986–87, with Lincoln City saw him relegated from first the Third Division and then the Fourth Division. In 1999–2000 he was relegated from the Football Conference with Altrincham. In 1992–93 he was a member of the Mansfield Town team relegated from the Second Division which, following the inception of the FA Premier League, was now the third level of the league system. Thus, he can also claim to have been relegated from the top five levels of the English football league system with five different clubs.

It is worth noting that, though he left before the season's end, he played for Notts County in the 1984–85 season when they went on to be relegated from the Second Division. Consequently, his first four seasons saw him involved with clubs relegated from the top four levels in order. To cap it all off, his fifth season (1987–88) saw him initially at Newport County who went on to be relegated from the Fourth Division.

== Career after football ==
Having previously worked as a watchmaker and in distribution, in October 2006, Hodson joined Warwickshire Police as the Police Community Support Officer for Ansley Common, Ansley Village, Whitacre and Arley. He is now responsible for the Baddesley Ensor, Grendon and also the Dordon area. Residing in Glascote, in Autumn 2008 he, along with a 16-year-old boy, helped save the life of a woman after she had fallen into a canal at Fazeley. Hodson was off duty at the time and had passed the scene whilst out jogging with his daughter.
