= Neil Parsley =

English footballer and manager

Personal information
- Full name: Neil Robert Parsley
- Date of birth: 25 April 1966 (age 60)
- Place of birth: Liverpool, England
- Position: Defender

Youth career
- 1985–1988: Witton Albion (semi-professional)

Senior career*
Years	Team	Apps	(Gls)
1988–1990	Leeds United		
1989–1990	→ Chester City (loan)	6	(0)
1990–1993	Huddersfield Town	57	(0)
1991	→ Doncaster Rovers (loan)	3	(0)
1993–1995	West Bromwich Albion	43	(0)
1995–1996	Exeter City		
1996	Witton Albion		
1996–1997	Guiseley		
1997–2001	Witton Albion		

Managerial career
- 2001–????: Guiseley
- 2008–2017: Farsley Celtic
- * Club domestic league appearances and goals

Neil Robert Parsley (born 25 April 1966) is an English former professional footballer who played as a defender for Witton Albion, Leeds United, Chester City, Huddersfield Town, Doncaster Rovers, West Bromwich Albion and Exeter City. He moved to Albion for £25,000 in September 1993, and went on to make 48 appearances for the club.

He was appointed as caretaker manager of Farsley Celtic on 3 October 2008, following the sacking of John Deacey. He was given the role permanently on 28 October.

In March 2010, Farsley Celtic A.F.C. were disbanded after failing to come out of administration. At the end of May, Parsley agreed to become the manager of the team that was formed to replace them, Farsley Celtic F.C. He left the club in May 2017 despite leading the club to promotion to the Premier Division of the Northern Premier League in 2016–17.
