= Chris Timons =

English football player

Personal information
- Full name: Christopher Timons
- Date of birth: 8 December 1974 (age 51)
- Place of birth: Shirebrook, England
- Positions: Defender; midfielder

Team information
- Current team: Sherwood Colliery (assistant manager)

Senior career*
Years	Team	Apps	(Gls)
1993–1994	Clipstone Welfare		
1994–1996	Mansfield Town	39	(2)
1996	Gainsborough Trinity		
1996–1997	Chesterfield	0	(0)
1997	Halifax Town	0	(0)
1997	Leyton Orient	5	(2)
1997–1998	Gainsborough Trinity		
1998–2001	Altrincham		
2001–2002	Ilkeston Town		
2002–2004	Stalybridge Celtic		
2004–2006	Hucknall Town		
2007	Ilkeston Town		
2007	Harrogate Town		
2007–2008	Hucknall Town		
2008–2011	Glapwell		
2009	→ Stafford Rangers (loan)		
2011	Rainworth Miners Welfare		
2012	Hucknall Town		
2012	Blackwell Miners Welfare		
2012– ?	Shirebrook Town		
?–2019	Clipstone		
2019–2022	Rainworth Miners Welfare		

Managerial career
- 2008: Hucknall Town (caretaker)
- * Club domestic league appearances and goals

Christopher Timons (born 8 December 1974) is an English former professional footballer who is assistant manager of Sherwood Colliery.

As a player, he was a defender and midfielder who played over a 29 year period, notably in the Football League for Mansfield Town, Chesterfield, Halifax Town and Leyton Orient.

== Career ==
His previous clubs include Clipstone Miners Welfare, Mansfield Town, Halifax Town, Chesterfield, Leyton Orient, Stafford Rangers, Gainsborough Trinity, Altrincham, Stalybridge Celtic, Ilkeston Town, Harrogate Town and Rainworth MW.

In September 2007, he was appointed caretaker manager of Hucknall Town following the resignation of Andy Legg. His only game in charge was a defeat at Burscough F.C. He left Hucknall Town for Ilkeston Town in summer 2008 but returned to Watnall Road in September 2008.

== Coaching career ==
In September 2022, Timons was appointed assistant manager of Sherwood Colliery.
