= Paul Sherlock =

English footballer

Personal information
- Full name: Paul Grahame Sherlock
- Date of birth: 17 November 1973 (age 52)
- Place of birth: Wigan, England
- Height: 5 ft 11 in (1.80 m)
- Positions: Left-back; midfielder

Senior career*
Years	Team	Apps	(Gls)
1992–1995	Notts County	12	(1)
1995–1997	Mansfield Town	39	(2)
- * Club domestic league appearances and goals

Paul Grahame Sherlock (born 17 November 1973) is an English retired professional footballer who played as a left-back, and occasionally midfielder, for Notts County and Mansfield Town.

== Career ==
He played non-league football for Bedford Town and Hucknall Town.

== Personal life ==
Since retiring, Sherlock earned qualifications to become a physical education teacher and worked at Hall Park Academy in Nottinghamshire. He was also deputy head teacher at the school
