= Mark Wright (footballer, born 1970) =

English footballer

Personal information
- Full name: Mark Andrew Wright
- Date of birth: 29 January 1970 (age 56)
- Place of birth: Manchester, England
- Position: Defender

Senior career*
Years	Team	Apps	(Gls)
1989–1992	Everton	1	(0)
1991	→ Blackpool (loan)	3	(0)
1991–1992	→ Huddersfield Town (loan)	10	(1)
1992–1993	Huddersfield Town	15	(0)
1993–1995	Wigan Athletic	30	(1)
	Chorley	?	(?)
- * Club domestic league appearances and goals

Mark Andrew Wright (born 29 January 1970, in Manchester, England) is a former professional footballer, who played for Everton, Blackpool, Huddersfield Town, Wigan Athletic and Chorley. He now works for Progress Sports in Merseyside which is a large training provider for learners aged 14–19.
