= Chris Withe =

English footballer (born 1962)

Personal information
- Full name: Christopher Withe
- Date of birth: 25 September 1962 (age 64)
- Place of birth: Liverpool, England
- Height: 5 ft 10 in (1.78 m)
- Position: Full back

Youth career
- 1979–1980: Newcastle United

Senior career*
Years	Team	Apps	(Gls)
1980–1983	Newcastle United	2	(0)
1983–1987	Bradford City	143	(2)
1987–1989	Notts County	80	(3)
1989–1991	Bury	31	(1)
1990	→ Chester City (loan)	2	(0)
1991–1993	Mansfield Town	76	(5)
1993–1996	Shrewsbury Town	89	(2)
1996–c.1999	Boston United	94	(3)
Total		417	(16)
- * Club domestic league appearances and goals

Christopher Withe (born 25 September 1962) is an English former professional footballer who played in the Football League for seven clubs. He is the younger brother of the former Aston Villa and England striker Peter Withe.

== Career ==
Withe was born in Liverpool, England as the younger brother of Peter Withe. He began his career as an apprentice with Newcastle United, with whom he turned professional in October 1980. His two first-team appearances for the Magpies came during the same month in matches against Shrewsbury Town and Chelsea.

He remained with the club until June 1983, when he moved to Bradford City on a free transfer. Withe spent more than four years with City, missing just one game when they won the Football League Division Three title in 1984–85. On the last day of that successful season his day was to turn into a nightmare when 56 spectators were killed in a horrendous stand fire while playing Lincoln City. He moved on for £50,000 to Notts County in October 1987, playing regularly before joining Bury in July 1989. He had a loan spell with Chester City in October 1990 and then moved to Mansfield Town in January 1991.

Withe experienced two relegations and a promotion in his three seasons at Field Mill. He moved to Shrewsbury Town in August 1993, a season that ended with the Gay Meadow club topping Division Three. He remained with the club until the end of the 1995–96 season, a campaign that saw him play at Wembley Stadium in the final of the Associate Members' Cup against Rotherham United.

Withe then dropped into non-league football with Boston United, where he played for three seasons. He was voted the club's player of the season and player's player of the season in 1996–97.

Since finishing his playing days, Withe has turned out occasionally for Hucknall-based Sunday league team Spot on along with his son Matt, as well as playing in the Masters football series.

For the 2013–14 season Withe signed for Kimberley Miners Welfare, a Saturday team who play in the senior division of the Nottinghamshire Senior League.

== Honours ==
Bradford City

- Football League Third Division: 1984–85

Mansfield Town

- Football League Fourth Division third-place promotion: 1991–92

Shrewsbury Town

- Football League Third Division: 1993–94
- Football League Trophy runner-up: 1995–96

Individual

- Boston United Player of the Season: 1996–97
