= Simon Charlton =

English footballer (born 1971)

Personal information
- Full name: Simon Thomas Charlton
- Date of birth: 25 October 1971 (age 55)
- Place of birth: Huddersfield, England
- Height: 5 ft 8 in (1.73 m)
- Position: Full-back

Youth career
- Huddersfield Town

Senior career*
Years	Team	Apps	(Gls)
1989–1993	Huddersfield Town	124	(1)
1993–1998	Southampton	114	(2)
1997–1998	→ Birmingham City (loan)	5	(0)
1998–2000	Birmingham City	67	(0)
2000–2004	Bolton Wanderers	120	(0)
2004–2006	Norwich City	45	(2)
2006–2007	Oldham Athletic	34	(1)
2009–2010	Mildenhall Town	2	(0)
Total		512	(6)

Managerial career
- 2009–2010: Mildenhall Town
- * Club domestic league appearances and goals

Simon Thomas Charlton (born 25 October 1971) is an English football coach, former player and radio summariser.

As a player, he was a full-back who notably played in the Premier League for Southampton, Bolton Wanderers and Norwich City. He also played in the Football League for Huddersfield Town, Birmingham City and Oldham Athletic. Over his career he made more than 500 league appearances combined. Although primarily a left back he could also play as a left-sided central defender or occasionally in midfield. During 2012 he earned an international cap for Sealand national football team, a micronation who are not recognised by FIFA.

Following retirement he returned to Norwich City as a youth team coach before managing Eastern Counties League club Mildenhall Town. He has since appeared as a co-commentator and summariser on Bolton Wanderers games for BBC Radio Manchester.

== Club career ==
Charlton was born in Huddersfield and began his career at his home-town club Huddersfield Town where he played over a hundred games for the Terriers before moving to Premiership club Southampton for £250,000 in 1993.

Making his Southampton debut in the opening game of 1993-94, Charlton made the left-back spot his own, succeeding Micky Adams, for the second half of that season. He would survive four managers, always being good for 20 to 30 League games a season. It wasn't until Dave Jones took over as manager that back problems contributed to him falling out of favour.

From Southampton he was initially loaned to Birmingham City, before making his move permanent in 1998. In May 2000, Charlton was released by Birmingham before signing for Bolton Wanderers, where he was chosen Player of the Year for the 2001–02 season, and subsequently moved to Norwich City in July 2004.

At the end of the 2005–06 season, Charlton was released by Norwich City. He left the club under something of a cloud, stating his belief that manager Nigel Worthington had made a scapegoat and an easy target out of him.

He signed a one-year deal with Oldham Athletic in August 2006. On his first appearance he conceded a penalty, which was saved, and provided the cross for the only goal of the game. He scored once for Oldham, scoring a goal from his own half in a 4–1 win over Gillingham. After his contract at Oldham expired in May 2007, he retired as a player and returned to Norwich City as a youth coach.

== International career ==
In May 2012, Charlton appeared for and captained the Sealand national football team in a match against the Chagos Islands. The match was held at the grounds of Godalming Town.

== Coaching and managerial career ==
Charlton became manager of Eastern Counties League club Mildenhall Town in April 2009. He made his debut for Mildenhall Town as a substitute in a 0–0 draw with Haverhill Rovers. He left his post in June 2010 due to "unforeseen circumstances and opportunities."

As of September 2011, he works as a Football Coach for the Global Soccer Network, an organisation which looks after the interests of several UK-based African players and many new talents within the game.

== Personal life ==
Charlton is a summariser of Bolton Wanderers games for BBC Radio Manchester.

== Honours ==
Bolton Wanderers

- Football League First Division play-offs: 2001
- Football League Cup runner-up: 2003–04

Individual

- PFA Team of the Year: 1991–92 Third Division, 1992–93 Second Division
- Bolton Wanderers Player of the Year: 2001–02
