= Paul Fleming (footballer) =

English footballer

Personal information
- Date of birth: 6 September 1967 (age 59)
- Place of birth: Halifax, England
- Position: Right back

Senior career*
| Years | Team | Apps | (Gls) |
| 1985–1991 | Halifax Town | 139 | (1) |
| 1991–1995 | Mansfield Town | 68 | (0) |
- Chorley
| Total | | 207 | (1) |
- * Club domestic league appearances and goals

Paul Fleming (born 6 September 1967) is an English former professional footballer who played as a right back, making over 200 career appearances.

== Career ==
Born in Halifax, Fleming played for Halifax Town, Mansfield Town and Chorley.

== Honours ==
Individual

- PFA Team of the Year: 1991–92 Fourth Division
