= Paul Holland (footballer) =

English footballer (born 1973)

Personal information
- Full name: Paul Jonathan Holland
- Date of birth: 8 July 1973 (age 53)
- Place of birth: Lincoln, England
- Position: Midfielder

Youth career
- Mansfield Town

Senior career*
Years	Team	Apps	(Gls)
1991–1995	Mansfield Town	149	(25)
1995–1996	Sheffield United	18	(1)
1996–1999	Chesterfield	114	(11)
1999–2000	Bristol City	32	(1)
Total		313	(38)

International career
1994–1995	England U21	2	(0)

Managerial career
- 2006: Mansfield Town (caretaker)
- 2008: Mansfield Town
- 2016–2017: Ilkeston
- 2018–2019: Long Eaton United (joint)
- * Club domestic league appearances and goals

Paul Holland (born 8 July 1973) is an English former footballer who made over 300 appearances in the Football League for Mansfield Town, Sheffield United, Chesterfield and Bristol City and was capped two times for the England U21s, playing alongside the likes of David Beckham and Robbie Fowler. He is a former manager of Mansfield Town and Ilkeston.

== Career ==
Holland was born in Lincoln. As a player, he was a combative midfielder. He began his career with Mansfield Town, then spent a brief spell with Sheffield United, before joining Chesterfield. In the 1996–97 season, he was part of Chesterfield's historic run to the FA Cup semi-final, coming on as a substitute in both the semi-final and semi-final replay against Middlesbrough. He turned down a £200,000 move to Port Vale following lengthy negotiations in 1994. Holland later joined Bristol City, where he suffered a serious knee injury during a match in September 2000, followed by a stress fracture of the kneecap in May 2001. Subsequently, he retired from playing and returned to Mansfield as youth team coach in January 2002.

He served as the Stags' assistant manager under Peter Shirtliff, and when Shirtliff was dismissed in December 2006, following a run of poor results, Holland was made caretaker manager. He reverted to assistant manager when Billy Dearden was appointed manager nine days later. When Dearden left the club in March 2008, Holland was again appointed caretaker manager. After four matches, he was given the opportunity by the board at Mansfield to stay as manager until the end of the 2007–08 season, with Stephen Booth, chief executive saying, "We have had three good performances out of four under Paul. I am confident in his abilities and hope everyone gets behind him." However, he was unable to prevent Mansfield from being relegated from the Football League and in July 2008, he was sacked with immediate effect.

In 2015, Holland became manager of amateur side Aston FC, a Sunday league team based in Aston-on-Trent, Derbyshire.

On 23 May 2016, Holland was announced as the new manager of Ilkeston. He left the role by mutual consent in February 2017. In November 2017, Holland pleaded guilty to fraud and forgery in relation to his time managing Ilkeston. He was handed two sentences of 24 weeks, to run concurrently, suspended for two years.

In December 2018, Holland was appointed joint-manager of Long Eaton United, alongside Andy Todd. The duo were replaced in May 2019.

He appeared on Countdown on Channel 4 on Wednesday 21 April 2021. He lost his first game but came close, getting the Countdown conundrum correct (BURLESQUE).

== Managerial statistics ==
Team	Nat	From	To	Record				
Team	Nat	From	To	G	W	L	D	Win %
Mansfield Town	(England)	19 December 2006	28 December 2006	3	2	1	0	66.67
Mansfield Town	(England)	8 March 2008	4 July 2008	12	3	6	3	25.00

== Honours ==
Bristol City

- Football League Trophy runner-up: 1999–2000

Individual

- PFA Team of the Year: 1994–95 Third Division
