= Gary Castledine =

Scottish footballer

Personal information
- Full name: Gary John Castledine
- Date of birth: 27 March 1970 (age 56)
- Place of birth: Dumfries, Scotland
- Position: Midfielder

Senior career*
Years	Team	Apps	(Gls)
1990–1991	Shirebrook		
1991–1995	Mansfield Town	66	(3)
1995	Telford United	6	(0)
1995	Cork City	2	(0)
1995	Chesterfield	0	(0)
1995–1997	Gresley Rovers		
- Ilkeston Town
- Eastwood Town
- Gainsborough Trinity
	Ashton United	10	(0)
- Gedling Town
- Hinckley United
- Alfreton Town
- Eastwood Town
- Glapwell
- Retford United
- Glapwell
- * Club domestic league appearances and goals

Gary John Castledine (born 27 March 1970) is a Scottish former professional footballer born in Dumfries who made 66 appearances in the Football League playing as a midfielder for Mansfield Town.

Prior to his stint with Mansfield, Castledine played at Shirebrook Town F.C. from August 1990 to February 1991. In July 2012, he was appointed manager to Shirebrook.
