= Stewart Hadley =

English footballer

Personal information
- Full name: Stewart Hadley
- Date of birth: 30 December 1973 (age 52)
- Place of birth: Stourbridge, England
- Height: 6 ft 0 in (1.83 m)
- Position: Forward

Senior career*
Years	Team	Apps	(Gls)
- Halesowen Town
1992–1993	Derby County	0	(0)
1993–1998	Mansfield Town	124	(31)
1998–2002	Kidderminster Harriers	94	(24)
- Worcester City
Total		218	(55)
- * Club domestic league appearances and goals

Stewart Hadley (born 30 December 1973) is an English former footballer who played in the Football League for Kidderminster Harriers and Mansfield Town.
