= Kieran O'Regan =

Irish footballer and manager

Personal information
- Full name: Kieran Michael O'Regan
- Date of birth: 9 November 1963 (age 62)
- Place of birth: Cork, Ireland
- Height: 5 ft 9 in (1.75 m)
- Position: Midfielder

Youth career
- Tramore Athletic

Senior career*
Years	Team	Apps	(Gls)
1982–1986	Brighton & Hove Albion	86	(2)
1987–1988	Swindon Town	26	(1)
1988–1993	Huddersfield Town	199	(25)
1993–1995	West Bromwich Albion	45	(2)
1995–1998	Halifax Town	135	(7)
- Altrincham

International career
1983–1985	Republic of Ireland U21	5	(0)
1983–1985	Republic of Ireland	4	(0)

Managerial career
- 1998–1999: Halifax Town
- * Club domestic league appearances and goals

Kieran Michael O'Regan (born 9 November 1963) is an Irish former footballer and football manager who played and managed in England. He now works as a football commentator for BBC Radio Leeds with Paul Ogden, covering Huddersfield Town matches.

== Playing career ==
O'Regan was signed by Brighton and Hove Albion in 1982 from Tramore Athletic. Whilst at Brighton he gained 4 caps for the Ireland team in 1984. He played a season for Swindon Town before getting a transfer to Huddersfield Town A.F.C. in 1988 signed by his former Ireland manager Eoin Hand. He spent six seasons with Town making 199 league appearances.

After a spell at West Bromwich Albion where he scored in the 1993 division 2 playoff final vs port vale, he returned to West Yorkshire to join Halifax Town. He jointly managed the side with George Mulhall from February 1997 to August 1998. During this time he was also the captain of the Halifax team who finished the 1997/98 as champions of the Football Conference. He became the sole manager in August 1998 following Mulhall's retirement. However, he lasted less than a full season in this role and was sacked in April 1999.

== International career ==
O'Regan gained four caps for the Republic of Ireland between 1983 and 1985. He made his debut on 16 November 1983 in the record 8–0 win over Malta at Dalymount Park.

== Managerial career ==
O'Regan started his managerial career with Halifax Town where he jointly managed the side with George Mulhall from February 1997 to August 1998 during which time he also captained the side. O'Regan became the sole manager in August 1998 following Mulhall's retirement. However, he lasted less than a full season in this role and was sacked in April 1999.

	Club	Period	Games	Wins	Draws	Defeats
England	Halifax Town (with George Mulhall)	02/1997 - 08/1998	58	30	17	11
England	Halifax Town	08/1998 - 04/1999	47	17	14	16

== After football ==
O'Regan worked as a summariser covering Huddersfield Town games on BBC Radio Leeds between 1999 and 2016.

He also works selling carpets at Carpet Clearance Centre on Lockwood Road, Huddersfield.
