= Kevin Noteman =

English footballer (born 1969)

Personal information
- Full name: Kevin Simon Noteman
- Date of birth: 15 October 1969 (age 57)
- Place of birth: Preston, England
- Position: Winger

Senior career*
Years	Team	Apps	(Gls)
1987–1988	Leeds United	1	(0)
1989–1992	Doncaster Rovers	106	(20)
1992–1995	Mansfield Town	95	(15)
1995	Doncaster Rovers	4	(1)
1995–1997	Chester City	68	(18)
1997–1998	Hibernians		
- Ilkeston Town
Total		274	(54)
- * Club domestic league appearances and goals

Kevin Simon Noteman (born 15 October 1969) is a footballer who played as a winger in the Football League for Leeds United, Doncaster Rovers, Mansfield Town and Chester City.
