= Iffy Onuora =

Scottish footballer (born 1967)

Personal information
- Full name: Ifem Onuora
- Date of birth: 28 July 1967 (age 59)
- Place of birth: Glasgow, Scotland
- Position: Striker

Team information
- Current team: England U21 (coach)

Youth career
- Everton
- 1988–1989: Bradford University F.C.

Senior career*
Years	Team	Apps	(Gls)
1989–1994	Huddersfield Town	165	(30)
1994–1996	Mansfield Town	28	(8)
1996–1998	Gillingham	62	(23)
1998–2000	Swindon Town	74	(25)
2000	→ Gillingham (loan)	1	(0)
2000–2002	Gillingham	85	(26)
2002–2004	Sheffield United	7	(1)
2003	→ Wycombe Wanderers (loan)	6	(0)
2003	→ Grimsby Town (loan)	8	(1)
2003–2004	Grimsby Town	11	(2)
2004	Tranmere Rovers	3	(0)
2004	Huddersfield Town	3	(1)
2004	Walsall	0	(0)
Total		453	(117)

Managerial career
- 2005–2006: Swindon Town
- 2007: Gillingham (caretaker)
- 2008: Lincoln City (caretaker)
- 2010–2011: Ethiopia
- * Club domestic league appearances and goals

Ifem "Iffy" Onuora (listern; born 28 July 1967) is a Scottish former professional footballer, manager, and coach for the England U21 national team. He is also the current equalities coach for the Professional Footballers Association.

As a player, he was a forward from 1988 until 2004. He notably had spells with Huddersfield Town, Swindon Town and Gillingham and spent his entire career playing in England. He also played in the Football League for Mansfield Town, Sheffield United, Wycombe Wanderers, Grimsby Town, Tranmere Rovers and Walsall. Having moved into coaching with the latter, he moved back to former clubs Swindon and Gillingham before briefly taking over as caretaker manager of Lincoln City before his move to Ethiopia. He now acts as a Match Delegate for referees in the Premier League. Between 2010 and 2011 Onuora coached the Ethiopian national football team.

== Playing career ==
Onuora was a journeyman striker who got his professional break playing for Huddersfield Town. He went on to play just under 200 times for The Terriers and scored over 30 goals for the club before he was transferred to Mansfield Town in 1994.

Onoura stayed with The Stags until Gillingham paid £25,000 for him in August 1996. It was at Priestfield Stadium where Onuora's goal scoring ability started to show, as he notched himself a tally of just under 30 goals in an 18-month stay with the club, before the Gills cashed in on their big front man by selling him to Swindon Town in March 1998. More goal scoring success was on the cards and he remained at the club until he secured a move back to Gillingham in January 2000, following a short loan spell.

Onuora went on to feature heavily for The Gills for the next two seasons before Neil Warnock tempted the player into moving to Bramall Lane to sign a two-year deal with Sheffield United, reuniting Onuora with his former Gillingham strike partner Carl Asaba. However football for Onoura was rare with the club and after starting the season alongside Asaba, he only made 8 appearances in both league and cup competitions, scoring one goal against Burnley. But after a season-ending Achilles injury, he never played for United again. In August 2003, it was announced that he would be carrying on with The Blades, but was loan listed where he signed for Wycombe Wanderers at the start of the season on a one-month loan deal.

After appearing six times for The Chairboys, Onuora returned to Sheffield, only to be poached by Paul Groves to sign for Grimsby Town also on a one-month loan. After a reasonable month with Grimsby, Onuora made his move to Blundell Park a permanent one, with the club pairing him up front with Michael Boulding in the absence of the injured Phil Jevons.

This seemed to work as a jinx for Onuora, as despite earning himself a permanent deal, his performances slipped and he was singled out by the club's supporters for booing, something which the player later spoke publicly about to the Grimsby Telegraph. Following the club's huge dip in form, Paul Groves was dismissed from his managerial duties and Onuora was to be the first player shown the door, after only signing a permanent deal four months previously.

He made his next port of call Tranmere Rovers but after three league appearances, the club decided to release him a month later. On 25 March 2004, Onuora signed professional terms once again for Huddersfield Town, who were his first career club. He played five times for The Terriers, scoring an important goal in the play-off semi final against Lincoln City but didn't make an appearance in the final at the Millennium Stadium. In July 2004, Paul Merson hired Onoura as a player/coach for Walsall, but this was short lived, and he was released in October 2004 and subsequently retired from playing. He scored 133 goals in nearly 500 professional matches.

== Managerial and coaching career ==
Upon retiring in 2004, Onuora moved into coaching. In July 2007 he successfully completed the final part of the UEFA Pro Licence course and joined a group of only 111 coaches holding the game's top qualification.

His coaching career began when he was appointed first-team coach at Walsall in July 2004 but his contract was terminated by Walsall's manager Paul Merson in October 2004, with Merson feeling a more experienced coach was required.

Later in the 2004–05 season, Onuora became a coach and youth development officer at Swindon Town. When Andy King was sacked after a poor start to the 2005–06 season, Onuora was appointed as Swindon's caretaker manager. In December 2005, Ron Atkinson, who had previously been fired from TV jobs for making racist remarks, was reportedly appointed to work alongside Onuora – one of the league's few black managers. Onuora later denied that this was the case, claiming that Atkinson was at the club to film a fly-on-the-wall documentary called Big Ron Manager.

Dennis Wise later became the new Swindon manager and Onoura was offered the chance to stay in a reduced capacity but he turned down that offer and left the club. He later commentated on Gillingham matches on BBC Radio Kent.

He returned to Gillingham in June 2007 as a first team coach. When manager Ronnie Jepson resigned in September 2007 he was named, initially alongside Mick Docherty, as joint caretaker manager. He held the position until the appointment of Mark Stimson on 1 November 2007 and briefly remained as a first team coach under the new regime before departing approximately two weeks later. In February 2008 he was appointed assistant to Peter Jackson at Lincoln City.

As of 1 March 2008, he became Lincoln's acting manager, whilst Peter Jackson underwent treatment for throat cancer. He was assisted in this role by Grant Brown. Under Onuora's tenure, Lincoln won five and lost six of their remaining fixtures. On 2 September 2009 both Peter Jackson and Iffy Onuora were sacked from their posts at Lincoln after the board were disappointed with the club's poor start to the season

On 30 June 2010, he signed a one-year deal to coach the Ethiopia national team. Under the contract received a monthly salary of $13,000, free accommodation, a car, two free air tickets and phone service. His salary and other expenses were covered by MIDROC Ethiopia, a company owned by Ethiopian-born billionaire Sheikh Mohammed Al Amoudi.

Onuora was sacked by Ethiopia in April 2011. The Ethiopian Football Federation cited disciplinary grounds for his dismissal just a month after the team's 4–0 defeat at the hands of Nigeria in a 2012 Africa Cup of Nations qualification match in Abuja. The Ethiopian national team had played 11 matches during his tenure, winning four, drawing in one and losing six matches.

An account of Onoura's time with Ethiopia, There's some cows on the pitch, they think it's all over...it is now!, was published in 2012 by JMD Media.

In 2012, he began working as an equalities officer and regional coach for the Professional Footballers Association.

In March 2018 he joined the coaching setup of the England U21 national team.

Since 2021, Onuora has served as the head of equality, diversity and inclusion for the Premier League, the first person to hold the post.

== Personal life ==
Born in Glasgow to Nigerian parents, Onuora grew up on Merseyside and attended Sacred Heart Catholic College in Crosby which his cousin Victor Anichebe later attended. He was first spotted playing football on Merseyside and briefly played for Everton's youth team during the mid-eighties.

Onuora is a known supporter of Everton. He is the brother of the Olympic Bronze medallist sprinter Anyika Onuora and the academic Emy Onuora, the author of Pitch Black, a 2015 book on black British footballers. He has a degree in economics from the University of Bradford.

As of 2000, Onuora was married to Helen and had two daughters.

== Managerial statistics ==
As of 18 April 2011.

Team	Nat	From	To	Record				
Team	Nat	From	To	G	W	L	D	Win %
Swindon Town	(England)	26 September 2005	2 May 2006	40	9	15	16	22.5
Gillingham (with Mick Docherty)	(England)	9 September 2007	8 October 2007	5	2	1	2	40
Gillingham	(England)	9 September 2007	8 October 2007	4	2	2	0	50
Lincoln City (with Grant Brown, in Peter Jackson's absence)	(England)	1 March 2008	6 May 2008	11	5	6	0	45.45
Ethiopia	(Ethiopia)	30 June 2010	18 April 2011	11	4	6	1	36.36

== Honours ==
Gillingham

- Football League Second Division play-offs: 2000
