= Kevin Lampkin =

English footballer

Personal information
- Full name: Kevin Lampkin
- Date of birth: 20 December 1972 (age 53)
- Place of birth: Liverpool, England
- Position: Striker

Senior career*
Years	Team	Apps	(Gls)
- Liverpool
1992–1993	Huddersfield Town	13	(0)
1993–1996	Mansfield Town	42	(3)
- Ilkeston Town
- * Club domestic league appearances and goals

Kevin Lampkin (born 20 December 1972) is a former professional footballer who played for Liverpool, Huddersfield Town, Mansfield Town & Ilkeston Town.
