= Halifax Town A.F.C. =

Former association football club in Halifax, England

Halifax Town
- Full name: Halifax Town Association Football Club
- Nickname: The Shaymen
- Founded: 24 May 1911
- Dissolved: 2008; 18 years ago
- Ground: The Shay
- Capacity: 14,000
- 2007–08: Conference National, 20th
| Home colours | Away colours |

Halifax Town Association Football Club was an English football club based in Halifax, West Yorkshire. They played in the English Football League from 1921 to 1993 and from 1998 to 2002.

The club was dissolved in 2008, but reformed that July under the name of FC Halifax Town.

The club's stadium was The Shay.

== History ==
=== Early years ===
The club was formed on 24 May 1911 at the Saddle Hotel. They initially played in the Yorkshire Combination and the Midland League. They were one of the founder members of Football League Third Division North in 1921, and remained in that division until restructuring in 1958, when they became a member of the Football League Third Division. Their highest league position prior to World War II was second in 1934–35.

=== 1960s–1990s ===
They finished third, one place off promotion in the Football League Third Division in the 1970–71 season.

The next season, they just avoided relegation on goal difference after Rotherham United lost on the last matchday to Tranmere Rovers for Halifax to move up. In 1976, they were relegated to Division 4.

In 1993, they were relegated to the Football Conference.

=== Conference ===
The club found the Conference no easier than the fourth division. After several poor seasons with severe financial constraints, the club was demoralised as there seemed to be no way out. However, previous manager George Mulhall returned towards the end of the 1996–97 and avoided relegation from the Conference. The next season Mulhall and Kieran O'Regan made a number of additions to the squad including Jamie Paterson, Mark Bradshaw and Lee Martin to put together a title-winning team. The Shaymen were crowned champions of the Conference and thus regained Football League status. Striker Geoff Horsfield was also the top scorer in the Conference that season, scoring 30 goals.

=== Back In the Football League ===
Previous club badge

At the start of the 1998–99 season, manager George Mulhall chose to retire and O'Regan was promoted to manager. Striker and top scorer Geoff Horsfield only played ten games before he was sold to Fulham for £300,000 in October 1998. Halifax made a strong start to their league campaign and were amongst the leaders until December, after which their results started to drop off and they slipped into mid-table. Although only three points off playoff positions, O'Regan was dismissed as manager by Chairman Jim Bown after a 0–0 draw with Rochdale in April 1999.

=== Return to Conference ===
Chris Wilder was appointed Halifax manager in July 2002. In their first season back in the Conference the Shaymen finished in eighth position.

In 2005–06, they finished 4th, and reached the Conference play-off final, losing to Hereford United.

=== Financial failure and dissolution ===
In 2007, the club was placed into administration by a local consortium trying to buy the club. In spite of being docked 10 points for entering administration, the club again survived relegation on the last day of the season. However, the club failed to get a Company Voluntary Arrangement (CVA) to bring the club out of administration,

Though the club appealed against the decision to remove it from the Football Conference, the appeal was unsuccessful and the club was wound up.

In May 2008, it had been revealed that following a major error, the club owed over £800,000 to Her Majesty's Revenue and Customs, making the club more than £2 million in the red.

The Supporters' Trust prepared a back-up plan to form a new club should it be required. However, the club was re-formed by the same directors of the previous legal entity under the name FC Halifax Town and was accepted to play in the Northern Premier League Division One North in the 2008–09 season.

== Stadiums ==
The club moved to The Shay in 1921 (hence the team's nickname "The Shaymen") and remained there until it folded.

From the mid-1990s on, the Shay underwent substantial development, and Halifax RLFC moved in and shared the venue. The Football Trust assisted in providing funds for the redevelopment.

== Players and managers ==
=== Notable players ===
For a list of notable Halifax Town players in sortable-list format see List of Halifax Town A.F.C. players; for all Halifax Town players with a Wikipedia article see Category:Halifax Town A.F.C. players.

=== Managerial history ===
- 1911 Joe McClelland
- 1930 Alex Raisbeck
- 1936 Jimmy Thomson
- 1947 Jack Breedon
- 1951 Billy Wootton
- 1952 Gerald Henry
- 1954 Bobby Browne (caretaker manager)
- 1954 Willie Watson
- 1956 Billy Burnikell
- 1956 Harold Taylor and E. Vivien Booth
- 1957 Harry Hooper
- 1962 Don McEvoy
- 1964 Willie Watson
- 1966 Vic Metcalfe
- 1967 Alan Ball Sr.
- 1970 George Kirby
- 1971 Ray Henderson
- 1972 George Mulhall
- 1974 Johnny Quinn
- 1976 Alan Ball Sr.
- 1977 Jimmy Lawson
- 1978 George Kirby
- 1981 Mickey Bullock
- 1984 Billy Ayre (caretaker manager)
- 1984 Mick Jones
- 1986 Billy Ayre
- 1990 Jim McCalliog
- 1991 John McGrath
- 1992 Mick Rathbone
- 1993 Peter Wragg
- 1994 John Bird
- 1996 George Mulhall & Kieran O'Regan
- 1996 John Carroll
- 1997 George Mulhall & Kieran O'Regan
- 1998 Kieran O'Regan
- 1999 David Worthington
- 1999 Mark Lillis
- 2000 Peter Butler & Tony Parks
- 2000 Greg Abbott
- 2001 Neil Redfearn & Tony Parks
- 2001 Alan Little
- 2002 Neil Redfearn (caretaker manager)
- 2002 Chris Wilder

== Honours ==
Halifax Town A.F.C. honours include:

=== League ===
- Football League Third Division (level 3)
  - Runners-up: 1935
  - Third place: 1971
- Conference National (level 5)
  - Champions: 1998
  - Play-off finalists: 2006

=== Cup ===
- West Riding County Cup
  - Winners: 2004
  - Runners-up: 2005
- FA Cup
  - Fifth round – 1932–33, 1952–53
- League Cup
  - Fourth round – 1963–64

== Club records ==
- Record attendance
  - 36,885 versus Tottenham Hotspur, FA Cup fifth round, 14 February 1953
- Most appearances
  - John Pickering, 402 appearances (367 in League) from 1965 to 1974
- Most goals scored
  - Ernie Dixon, 132 goals (127 league, 5 cup) from 1922 to 1930 (other source indicates 128 League goals and that he played for the club in two separate spells)
- Most league goals in a season (individual)
  - Albert Valentine (1934–35) – 34
- Most league goals in a season (club)
  - 83 in Division Three North (1957–58)
- Record transfer fee paid
  - £150,000 for Chris Tate in July 1999
- Record transfer fee received
  - £350,000 for Geoff Horsfield in October 1998
- A blue plaque honouring the club was erected by the Halifax Civic Trust.
