= 1989–90 Mansfield Town F.C. season =

Mansfield Town
1989–90 season
- Manager: George Foster
- Stadium: Field Mill
- Third Division: 15th
- FA Cup: First Round
- League Cup: Second Round
- Football League Trophy: First Round

The 1989–90 season was Mansfield Town's 53rd season in the Football League and 19th in the Third Division they finished in 15th position with 55 points.

== Final league table ==
Pos	Team	Pld	W	D	L	GF	GA	GD	Pts
13	Brentford	46	18	7	21	66	66	0	61
14	Leyton Orient	46	16	10	20	52	56	−4	58
15	Mansfield Town	46	16	7	23	50	65	−15	55
16	Chester City	46	13	15	18	43	55	−12	54
17	Swansea City	46	14	12	20	45	63	−18	54

== Results ==
=== Football League Third Division ===
Match	Date	Opponent	Venue	Result	Attendance	Scorers
1	19 August 1989	Chester City	A	2–0	2,401	Charles, Christie
2	26 August 1989	Bristol Rovers	H	0–1	3,051	
3	2 September 1989	Fulham	A	0–1	4,551	
4	9 September 1989	Cardiff City	H	1–0	2,767	Charles
5	16 September 1989	Bury	A	0–3	2,821	
6	23 September 1989	Blackpool	H	0–3	2,629	
7	30 September 1989	Bolton Wanderers	A	1–1	5,797	Charles
8	7 October 1989	Shrewsbury Town	H	1–0	3,148	Pittman (o.g.)
9	14 October 1989	Walsall	H	0–2	3,230	
10	16 October 1989	Tranmere Rovers	A	1–1	6,909	Charles
11	21 October 1989	Bristol City	H	1–0	2,941	Christie
12	24 October 1989	Swansea City	H	4–0	2,644	Christie, Kent, Stringfellow (2)
13	28 October 1989	Reading	A	0–1	3,242	
14	31 October 1989	Preston North End	H	2–2	3,124	Wilkinson (2)
15	4 November 1989	Notts County	H	1–3	6,016	Wilkinson
16	10 November 1989	Crewe Alexandra	A	1–2	3,333	Christie
17	25 November 1989	Leyton Orient	A	1–3	3,317	Wilkinson
18	2 December 1989	Huddersfield Town	H	1–2	2,966	Kearney
19	17 December 1989	Brentford	A	1–2	5,022	Wilkinson
20	26 December 1989	Rotherham United	H	3–1	6,384	Smalley, Stringfellow, Christie
21	30 December 1989	Northampton Town	H	1–2	3,210	Christie
22	1 January 1990	Wigan Athletic	A	0–4	2,478	
23	13 January 1990	Bristol Rovers	A	1–1	5,339	Leishman
24	20 January 1990	Chester City	H	1–0	2,258	Wilkinson
25	3 February 1990	Blackpool	A	1–3	4,402	Wilkinson
26	10 February 1990	Bury	H	1–0	2,425	Wilkinson
27	13 February 1990	Fulham	H	3–0	2,256	Christie, Charles, Hathaway
28	17 February 1990	Huddersfield Town	A	0–1	5,441	
29	24 February 1990	Leyton Orient	H	1–0	2,544	Wilkinson
30	3 March 1990	Birmingham City	A	1–4	5,746	Christie
31	6 March 1990	Bolton Wanderers	H	0–1	3,336	
32	10 March 1990	Swansea City	A	0–1	3,304	
33	17 March 1990	Shrewsbury Town	H	2–1	2,231	Christie, Charles
34	20 March 1990	Walsall	A	0–1	3,017	
35	24 March 1990	Tranmere Rovers	H	1–0	3,363	Wilkinson
36	27 March 1990	Cardiff City	A	0–1	2,280	
37	31 March 1990	Bristol City	A	1–1	11,773	Kearney
38	3 April 1990	Birmingham City	H	5–2	4,164	Wilkinson (5)
39	7 April 1990	Reading	A	1–1	2,568	Christie
40	10 April 1990	Preston North End	A	0–4	5,039	
41	14 April 1990	Wigan Athletic	H	1–0	2,423	Charles
42	16 April 1990	Rotherham United	A	0–0	5,079	
43	21 April 1990	Brentford	H	2–3	2,347	Christie, Clark
44	24 April 1990	Northampton Town	A	2–1	2,119	Christie, Kearney
45	28 April 1990	Crewe Alexandra	H	2–1	3,071	Hodges, Swain (o.g.)
46	5 May 1990	Notts County	A	2–4	6,906	Christie, Kent

=== FA Cup ===
Round	Date	Opponent	Venue	Result	Attendance	Scorers
R1	19 November 1989	Wigan Athletic	A	0–2	3,087	

=== League Cup ===
Round	Date	Opponent	Venue	Result	Attendance	Scorers
R1 1st leg	22 August 1989	Northampton Town	H	1–1	3,095	Stringfellow
R1 2nd leg	5 September 1989	Northampton Town	A	2–0	3,693	Charles, Stringfellow
R2 1st leg	19 September 1989	Luton Town	H	3–4	5,361	Stringfellow, Christie (2)
R2 2nd leg	3 October 1989	Luton Town	A	2–7	6,519	Kearney, Wilkinson

=== League Trophy ===
Round	Date	Opponent	Venue	Result	Attendance	Scorers
PR	28 November 1989	Leyton Orient	A	0–2	1,133	
PR	9 December 1989	Brentford	H	2–1	1,445	Charles (2)
PR Replay	9 January 1990	Leyton Orient	H	2–1	1,938	Kearney, Gray
R1	17 January 1990	Maidstone United	A	1–2	1,020	Christie

== Squad statistics ==
- Squad list sourced from 1989–90 Mansfield Town F.C. season at the English National Football Archive (subscription required)

Pos.	Name	League		FA Cup		League Cup		League Trophy		Total	
Pos.	Name	Apps	Goals	Apps	Goals	Apps	Goals	Apps	Goals	Apps	Goals
GK	(England) Andy Beasley	26	0	0	0	2	0	2	0	30	0
GK	(England) Brian Cox	15	0	1	0	2	0	2	0	20	0
GK	(England) Jason Pearcey	5	0	0	0	0	0	0	0	5	0
DF	(England) Steve Chambers	4(3)	0	0	0	0(1)	0	1(1)	0	5(5)	0
DF	(England) Simon Coleman	5	0	0	0	3	0	0	0	8	0
DF	(England) Wayne Fairclough	13	0	0	0	0	0	0	0	13	0
DF	(England) George Foster	42	0	1	0	3	0	4	0	50	0
DF	(England) Kevin Gray	16	0	0(1)	0	1	0	2(1)	1	19(2)	1
DF	(England) Tony Kenworthy	1	0	0	0	0	0	0	0	1	0
DF	(England) Craig McKernon	7	0	0	0	3	0	1	0	11	0
DF	(Scotland) Malcolm Murray	28	0	0	0	0	0	2	0	30	0
DF	(England) Mark Place	1	0	0	0	0	0	0	0	1	0
DF	(England) Steve Prindiville	22	0	1	0	3(1)	0	3	0	29(1)	0
DF	(England) Mark Smalley	28	1	0	0	0	0	0	0	28	1
MF	(England) Steve Charles	42(1)	7	1	0	4	1	2	2	50(2)	8
MF	(Scotland) Martin Clark	14	1	0	0	0	0	0	0	14	1
MF	(England) David Hodges	8(11)	1	1	0	1	0	0	0	10(11)	1
MF	(England) David Hunt	21(1)	0	1	0	4	0	4	0	30(1)	0
MF	(England) Mark Kearney	41	3	1	0	4	1	4	1	50	5
MF	(England) Tony Lowery	14	0	1	0	4	0	1	0	20	0
MF	(Republic of Ireland) Don O'Riordan	6	0	0	0	0	0	0	0	6	0
FW	(England) Trevor Christie	43(2)	13	1	0	4	2	4	1	52(2)	16
FW	(England) Ian Hathaway	11(11)	1	0	0	1(1)	0	2	0	14(12)	1
FW	(England) Kevin Kent	38	3	1	0	0	0	3(1)	0	42(1)	3
FW	(England) Graham Leishman	1(3)	1	0	0	0(1)	0	1	0	2(4)	1
FW	(England) Gary McDonald	1(1)	0	0	0	0	0	0(1)	0	1(2)	0
FW	(England) Ian Stringfellow	17(2)	3	0(1)	0	4	3	1(1)	0	22(4)	6
FW	(England) Steve Wilkinson	36(1)	15	1	0	1	1	4	0	42(1)	16
–	Own goals	–	1	–	0	–	0	–	0	–	1
