= 1988–89 Mansfield Town F.C. season =

Mansfield Town
1988–89 season
- Manager: Ian Greaves; George Foster
- Stadium: Field Mill
- Third Division: 15th
- FA Cup: First Round
- League Cup: First Round
- Football League Trophy: Preliminary Round

The 1988–89 season was Mansfield Town's 52nd season in the Football League and 18th in the Third Division they finished in 15th position with 59 points.

== Final league table ==
Pos	Team	Pld	W	D	L	GF	GA	GD	Pts
13	Bury	46	16	13	17	55	67	−12	61
14	Huddersfield Town	46	17	9	20	63	73	−10	60
15	Mansfield Town	46	14	17	15	48	52	−4	59
16	Cardiff City	46	14	15	17	44	56	−12	57
17	Wigan Athletic	46	14	14	18	55	53	+2	56

== Results ==
=== Football League Third Division ===
Match	Date	Opponent	Venue	Result	Attendance	Scorers
1	27 August 1988	Northampton Town	H	1–1	4,042	Charles
2	3 September 1988	Wigan Athletic	A	0–0	2,514	
3	10 September 1988	Fulham	H	3–1	2,734	Cassells (2), Hodges
4	17 September 1988	Blackpool	A	1–1	4,012	Owen
5	20 September 1988	Gillingham	H	2–0	3,153	Cassells, Stringfellow
6	24 September 1988	Bury	A	1–0	2,412	Cassells
7	1 October 1988	Notts County	H	1–1	5,908	Hodges
8	4 October 1988	Southend United	A	1–1	2,436	Hodges
9	8 October 1988	Bristol Rovers	H	2–1	3,381	Charles (2)
10	15 October 1988	Reading	A	0–1	6,604	
11	22 October 1988	Cardiff City	A	2–2	3,566	Cassells (2)
12	26 October 1988	Chester City	A	0–0	1,853	
13	29 October 1988	Bristol City	H	2–2	3,808	Charles, Kent
14	5 November 1988	Preston North End	A	0–2	6,659	
15	8 November 1988	Swansea City	A	1–3	3,526	Hodges
16	12 November 1988	Brentford	H	1–0	3,196	Charles
17	26 November 1988	Aldershot	H	1–1	2,718	Coleman
18	3 December 1988	Chesterfield	A	3–1	4,236	Coleman (2), Hunter (o.g.)
19	17 December 1988	Wolverhampton Wanderers	A	2–6	12,134	Coleman, Leishman
20	26 December 1988	Port Vale	A	0–1	5,224	
21	31 December 1988	Huddersfield Town	H	1–0	4,644	Owen
22	2 January 1989	Bolton Wanderers	A	0–0	4,935	
23	14 January 1989	Wigan Athletic	H	0–1	2,797	
24	21 January 1989	Fulham	A	1–1	4,148	Cassells
25	28 January 1989	Blackpool	H	0–1	2,738	
26	4 February 1989	Notts County	A	1–2	5,924	Cassells
27	11 February 1989	Southend United	H	4–0	2,562	Cassells (2), Charles, Kent
28	18 February 1989	Bristol Rovers	A	0–0	4,669	
29	25 February 1989	Reading	H	2–1	3,012	Owen (2)
30	28 February 1989	Chester City	H	2–0	2,769	Charles, Kearney
31	4 March 1989	Cardiff City	A	0–0	3,217	
32	11 March 1989	Preston North End	H	0–3	4,708	
33	18 March 1989	Northampton Town	A	1–2	2,821	Berry (o.g.)
34	21 March 1989	Bristol City	A	0–2	5,064	
35	25 March 1989	Bolton Wanderers	H	1–1	3,254	Christie
36	27 March 1989	Port Vale	H	2–1	8,198	Owen, Coleman
37	1 April 1989	Wolverhampton Wanderers	H	3–1	9,209	Kent, Cassells (2)
38	4 April 1989	Sheffield United	H	0–1	8,524	
39	8 April 1989	Huddersfield Town	A	0–2	5,327	
40	15 April 1989	Gillingham	A	0–3	2,414	
41	22 April 1989	Bury	H	1–1	2,827	Kent
42	25 April 1989	Sheffield United	A	2–1	11,638	Kent, Cassells
43	29 April 1989	Brentford	A	0–1	5,234	
44	2 May 1989	Swansea City	H	0–0	2,550	
45	6 May 1989	Chesterfield	H	3–1	4,779	Cassells, Kearney, Hathaway
46	13 May 1989	Aldershot	A	0–0	1,549	

=== FA Cup ===
Round	Date	Opponent	Venue	Result	Attendance	Scorers
R1	19 November 1988	Sheffield United	H	1–1	9,101	Kent
R1 Replay	22 November 1988	Sheffield United	A	1–2	12,879	Kearney

=== League Cup ===
Round	Date	Opponent	Venue	Result	Attendance	Scorers
R1 1st leg	30 August 1988	Notts County	A	0–5	4,428	
R1 2nd leg	6 September 1988	Notts County	H	1–0	2,695	Hodges

=== League Trophy ===
Round	Date	Opponent	Venue	Result	Attendance	Scorers
PR	29 November 1988	Notts County	H	1–1	2,477	Kearney
PR	10 November 1988	Chesterfield	A	1–2	2,640	Coleman

== Squad statistics ==
- Squad list sourced from 1988–89 Mansfield Town F.C. season at the English National Football Archive (subscription required)

Pos.	Name	League		FA Cup		League Cup		League Trophy		Total	
Pos.	Name	Apps	Goals	Apps	Goals	Apps	Goals	Apps	Goals	Apps	Goals
GK	(England) Andy Beasley	6	0	0	0	0	0	0	0	6	0
GK	(England) Brian Cox	39	0	2	0	2	0	2	0	45	0
GK	(England) Jason Pearcey	1	0	0	0	0	0	0	0	1	0
DF	(England) Nicky Andersen	1	0	0	0	0	0	1	0	2	0
DF	(England) Steve Chambers	3(2)	0	0	0	0	0	0	0	3(2)	0
DF	(England) Simon Coleman	45	5	2	0	2	0	2	1	51	6
DF	(England) George Foster	42	0	2	0	2	0	2	0	48	0
DF	(England) Paul Garner	1(2)	0	0	0	0	0	0	0	1(2)	0
DF	(England) Mike Graham	1	0	0	0	1	0	0	0	2	0
DF	(England) Kevin Gray	1	0	0	0	0	0	0	0	1	0
DF	(England) Tony Kenworthy	19(1)	0	2	0	2	0	2	0	25(1)	0
DF	(England) Craig McKernon	42	0	2	0	1	0	1	0	46	0
DF	(England) Mark Place	11(3)	0	0	0	0	0	0	0	11(3)	0
DF	(England) John Ryan	23(7)	0	2	0	0(1)	0	1(1)	0	26(9)	0
MF	(England) Steve Charles	45(1)	7	2	0	2	0	1(1)	0	50(2)	7
MF	(England) David Hodges	37(2)	4	2	0	1	1	1(1)	0	41(3)	5
MF	(England) Mark Kearney	44(1)	2	0(2)	1	2	0	2	1	48(3)	4
MF	(England) Tony Lowery	11(1)	0	2	0	2	0	2	0	17(1)	0
FW	(England) Keith Cassells	36(1)	14	0	0	2	0	0	0	38(1)	14
FW	(England) Trevor Christie	12	1	0	0	0	0	0	0	12	1
FW	(England) Ian Hathaway	4(8)	1	0	0	0	0	0	0	4(8)	1
FW	(England) Kevin Kent	36(3)	5	2	1	0	0	2	0	40(3)	6
FW	(England) Graham Leishman	6(6)	1	0	0	0	0	0(1)	0	6(7)	1
FW	(England) Gordon Owen	39(2)	5	2	0	1	0	1	0	43(2)	5
FW	(England) Ian Stringfellow	0(8)	1	0(1)	0	2	0	2	0	4(9)	1
FW	(England) Steve Williams	1(2)	0	0	0	0	0	0	0	1(2)	0
–	Own goals	–	2	–	0	–	0	–	0	–	2
