= 1990–91 Mansfield Town F.C. season =

Mansfield Town
1990–91 season
- Manager: George Foster
- Stadium: Field Mill
- Third Division: 24th
- FA Cup: Third Round
- League Cup: First Round
- Football League Trophy: Quarter Final

The 1990–91 season was Mansfield Town's 54th season in the Football League and 20th in the Third Division. They finished in 24th position with 38 points and were relegated to the Fourth Division.

== Final league table ==
Pos	Team	Pld	W	D	L	GF	GA	GD	Pts	Promotion or relegation
20	Swansea City	46	13	9	24	49	72	−23	48	Qualification for the Cup Winners' Cup first round
21	Fulham	46	10	16	20	41	56	−15	46	
22	Crewe Alexandra (R)	46	11	11	24	62	80	−18	44	Relegation to the Fourth Division
23	Rotherham United (R)	46	10	12	24	50	87	−37	42	Relegation to the Fourth Division
24	Mansfield Town (R)	46	8	14	24	42	63	−21	38	Relegation to the Fourth Division

(R) Relegated

== Results ==
=== Football League Third Division ===
Match	Date	Opponent	Venue	Result	Attendance	Scorers
1	25 August 1990	Wigan Athletic	A	2–0	2,049	Charles, Stringfellow
2	1 September 1990	Brentford	A	0–2	2,513	
3	8 September 1990	Leyton Orient	A	1–2	3,692	Leishman
4	15 September 1990	Exeter City	H	0–2	2,399	
5	18 September 1990	Cambridge United	H	2–2	2,253	Christie, O'Shea (o.g.)
6	22 September 1990	Bury	A	0–1	2,620	
7	29 September 1990	Southend United	H	0–1	2,121	
8	2 October 1990	Bolton Wanderers	A	1–1	3,631	Fairclough
9	6 October 1990	Shrewsbury Town	A	3–0	2,587	Christie, Kent, Fairclough
10	13 October 1990	Preston North End	H	0–1	3,225	
11	20 October 1990	Bradford City	H	0–1	3,583	
12	22 October 1990	Tranmere Rovers	A	2–6	6,001	Christie, Charles
13	27 October 1990	Huddersfield Town	A	2–2	4,413	Christie, Kent
14	3 November 1990	Crewe Alexandra	H	1–3	2,710	Kent
15	10 November 1990	Swansea City	H	2–0	2,200	Wilkinson (2)
16	24 November 1990	Rotherham United	A	1–1	3,703	Charles
17	1 December 1990	Grimsby Town	A	0–2	5,350	
18	15 December 1990	Chester City	H	1–0	1,919	Christie
19	22 December 1990	Fulham	H	1–1	2,833	Wilkinson
20	26 December 1990	Bournemouth	A	0–0	5,280	
21	29 December 1990	Reading	A	1–2	4,100	Fairclough
22	1 January 1991	Birmingham City	H	1–2	3,654	Charles
23	12 January 1991	Brentford	A	0–0	6,064	
24	19 January 1991	Wigan Athletic	H	1–1	2,166	Christie
25	26 January 1991	Exeter City	A	0–2	3,432	
26	1 February 1991	Cambridge United	A	1–2	5,094	Gray
27	5 February 1991	Bury	H	0–1	1,992	
28	23 February 1991	Swansea City	A	2–1	3,354	Wilkinson, Christie
29	2 March 1991	Grimsby Town	H	1–1	3,506	Kent
30	5 March 1991	Stoke City	H	0–0	2,941	
31	9 March 1991	Chester City	A	0–1	957	
32	12 March 1991	Bolton Wanderers	H	4–0	3,622	Wilkinson, Christie, Fairclough (2)
33	15 March 1991	Southend United	A	1–2	5,440	Wilkinson
34	19 March 1991	Preston North End	A	1–3	3,246	Christie
35	23 March 1991	Shrewsbury Town	H	2–1	2,524	Wilkinson, Fairclough
36	26 March 1991	Stoke City	A	1–3	9,196	Smalley
37	30 March 1991	Bournemouth	H	1–1	2,665	Wilkinson
38	1 April 1991	Fulham	A	0–1	3,555	
39	6 April 1991	Reading	H	2–0	2,005	Wilkinson, Christie
40	13 April 1991	Birmingham City	A	0–0	7,635	
41	16 April 1991	Leyton Orient	H	3–3	2,050	Wilkinson, Ford, Stringfellow
42	20 April 1991	Bradford City	A	0–1	6,307	
43	23 April 1991	Rotherham United	H	1–2	4,047	Wilkinson
44	27 April 1991	Tranmere Rovers	H	0–2	2,388	
45	4 May 1991	Huddersfield Town	H	0–0	2,507	
46	11 May 1991	Crewe Alexandra	A	0–3	2,648	

=== FA Cup ===
Round	Date	Opponent	Venue	Result	Attendance	Scorers
R1	17 November 1990	Preston North End	A	1–0	5,320	Kearney
R2	17 December 1990	York City	H	2–1	3,790	Charles, Wilkinson
R3	5 January 1991	Sheffield Wednesday	H	0–2	9,079	

=== League Cup ===
Round	Date	Opponent	Venue	Result	Attendance	Scorers
R1 1st leg	28 August 1990	Cardiff City	H	1–1	2,091	Charles
R1 2nd leg	4 September 1990	Cardiff City	A	0–3	2,539	

=== League Trophy ===
Round	Date	Opponent	Venue	Result	Attendance	Scorers
PR	27 November 1990	Northampton Town	A	2–1	2,186	Stringfellow, Charles
PR	8 January 1991	Stoke City	H	3–0	1,660	Hathaway, Lowery, Butler (o.g.)
R1	19 February 1991	Fulham	H	2–1	1,511	Wilkinson, North (o.g.)
QF	26 February 1991	Birmingham City	A	0–2	5,358	

== Squad statistics ==
- Squad list sourced from 1990–91 Mansfield Town F.C. season at the English National Football Archive (subscription required)

Pos.	Name	League		FA Cup		League Cup		League Trophy		Total	
Pos.	Name	Apps	Goals	Apps	Goals	Apps	Goals	Apps	Goals	Apps	Goals
GK	(England) Andy Beasley	42	0	3	0	2	0	2	0	49	0
GK	(England) Jason Pearcey	4	0	0	0	0	0	2	0	6	0
DF	(England) Steve Chambers	30(2)	0	0	0	2	0	2(1)	0	34(3)	0
DF	(England) Wayne Fairclough	41	6	3	0	1	0	4	0	49	6
DF	(England) Greg Fee	10	0	0	0	0	0	0	0	10	0
DF	(England) George Foster	34	0	3	0	2	0	3	0	42	0
DF	(England) Kevin Gray	28(3)	1	3	0	1	0	4	0	36(3)	1
DF	(Scotland) Malcolm Murray	28(2)	0	3	0	1	0	2	0	34(2)	0
DF	(England) Steve Prindiville	4(2)	0	0	0	0	0	1	0	5(2)	0
DF	(England) Mark Smalley	21	1	0	0	1	0	2	0	24	1
DF	(England) Chris Withe	21	0	0	0	0	0	0	0	21	0
MF	(England) Steve Charles	36(3)	4	3	1	2	1	3	1	44(3)	7
MF	(Scotland) Martin Clark	24	0	3	0	2	0	2	0	31	0
MF	(England) David Hodges	0(2)	0	0	0	0(1)	0	0	0	0(3)	0
MF	(England) Paul Holland	1	0	0	0	0	0	0	0	1	0
MF	(England) Mark Kearney	20	0	3	1	2	0	2	0	27	1
MF	(England) Martin Ling	3	0	0	0	0	0	0	0	3	0
MF	(England) Tony Lowery	5(2)	0	0(1)	0	0	0	3	1	8(3)	1
MF	(England) Steve Spooner	12	0	0	0	0	0	0	0	12	0
FW	(England) Gary Chapmam	6	0	0	0	0	0	0	0	6	0
FW	(England) Trevor Christie	33(2)	10	3	0	0	0	3	0	39(2)	10
FW	(England) Gary Ford	12	1	0	0	0	0	0	0	12	1
FW	(England) Ian Hathaway	6(4)	0	1	0	0	0	1(1)	1	8(5)	1
FW	(England) Kevin Kent	27	4	2	0	2	0	3	0	34	4
FW	(England) Graham Leishman	1(10)	1	0	0	0	0	0	0	1(10)	1
FW	(England) Mark Smith	6(1)	0	0	0	0	0	0	0	6(1)	0
FW	(England) Ian Stringfellow	15(9)	2	1(1)	0	2	0	2	1	20(10)	3
FW	(England) Steve Wilkinson	36(3)	11	2(1)	1	2	0	3	1	43(4)	13
–	Own goals	–	1	–	0	–	0	–	2	–	3
