= 1987–88 Mansfield Town F.C. season =

Mansfield Town
1987–88 season
- Manager: Ian Greaves
- Stadium: Field Mill
- Third Division: 19th
- FA Cup: Fourth Round
- League Cup: Second Round
- Football League Trophy: Quarter Final

The 1987–88 season was Mansfield Town's 51st season in the Football League and 17th in the Third Division they finished in 19th position with 54 points.

== Final league table ==
Pos	Team	Pld	W	D	L	GF	GA	GD	Pts	Relegation
17	Southend United	46	14	13	19	65	83	−18	55	
18	Chesterfield	46	15	10	21	41	70	−29	55	
19	Mansfield Town	46	14	12	20	48	59	−11	54	
20	Aldershot	46	15	8	23	64	74	−10	53	
21	Rotherham United (R)	46	12	16	18	50	66	−16	52	Qualification for the Fourth Division play-offs

Rules for classification: 1) Points; 2) Goal difference; 3) Goals scored
(R) Relegated

== Results ==
=== Football League Third Division ===
Match	Date	Opponent	Venue	Result	Attendance	Scorers
1	15 August 1987	Bristol City	H	2–0	5,441	Cassells, Stringfellow
2	29 August 1987	Chesterfield	H	0–1	5,223	
3	31 August 1987	Sunderland	A	1–4	13,994	Stringfellow
4	4 September 1987	Fulham	H	0–2	3,519	
5	12 September 1987	Grimsby Town	A	3–2	3,436	Cassells, Hodges, Charles
6	15 September 1987	Wigan Athletic	H	0–1	3,263	
7	19 September 1987	Southend United	H	1–0	2,857	Stringfellow
8	26 September 1987	Rotherham United	A	1–2	3,839	Kent
9	29 September 1987	Doncaster Rovers	H	2–0	3,159	Stringfellow (2)
10	3 October 1987	Bristol Rovers	H	1–2	2,980	Charles
11	11 October 1987	Notts County	A	1–1	8,573	Charles
12	17 October 1987	Gillingham	H	2–2	2,957	Charles, Stringfellow
13	20 October 1987	Northampton Town	H	3–1	3,646	Charles, Hodges, Coleman
14	24 October 1987	Chester City	A	2–0	2,461	Charles, Cassells
15	31 October 1987	Blackpool	H	0–0	3,223	
16	3 November 1987	Bury	A	0–1	2,248	
17	7 November 1987	Preston North End	H	0–0	3,632	
18	21 November 1987	Brighton & Hove Albion	H	1–1	3,285	Kent
19	28 November 1987	Walsall	A	1–2	4,327	Charles
20	12 December 1987	Brentford	A	2–2	3,729	Cassells, Stringfellow
21	20 December 1987	Port Vale	H	4–0	3,173	Kent (4)
22	26 December 1987	Rotherham United	H	0–1	4,771	
23	28 December 1987	York City	A	2–2	2,781	Charles, Kent
24	1 January 1988	Chesterfield	A	1–3	5,070	Cassells
25	2 January 1988	Grimsby Town	H	1–0	3,320	Ryan
26	15 January 1988	Southend United	A	1–2	3,079	Cassells
27	6 February 1988	Fulham	A	0–0	3,330	
28	13 February 1988	York City	H	2–1	2,756	Charles, Owen
29	20 February 1988	Bristol City	A	2–1	9,528	Kent, Graham
30	27 February 1988	Bristol Rovers	H	1–0	3,192	Cassells
31	1 March 1988	Doncaster Rovers	A	2–0	1,187	Cassells, Coleman
32	5 March 1988	Gillingham	A	0–0	3,627	
33	12 March 1988	Notts County	H	1–1	8,002	Owen
34	19 March 1988	Blackpool	A	0–2	2,847	
35	22 March 1988	Aldershot	H	1–0	2,344	Charles
36	26 March 1988	Chester City	H	1–2	2,918	Charles
37	28 March 1988	Wigan Athletic	A	1–2	3,217	Kent
38	2 April 1988	Preston North End	A	0–1	6,278	
39	5 April 1988	Walsall	H	1–3	4,901	Charles
40	10 April 1988	Northampton Town	A	0–2	6,917	
41	19 April 1988	Aldershot	A	0–3	2,339	
42	23 April 1988	Bury	H	0–0	2,384	
43	26 April 1988	Sunderland	H	0–4	6,935	
44	30 April 1988	Brighton & Hove Albion	A	1–3	11,503	Stringfellow
45	2 May 1988	Brentford	H	2–1	2,664	Kent, Charles
46	7 May 1988	Port Vale	A	1–1	3,617	Owen

=== FA Cup ===
Round	Date	Opponent	Venue	Result	Attendance	Scorers
R1	14 November 1987	Preston North End	A	1–1	7,415	Stringfellow
R1 Replay	17 November 1987	Preston North End	H	4–2	4,682	Cassells (2), Charles, Kent
R2	5 December 1987	Lincoln City	H	4–3	5,671	Cassells, Lowery, Kent, Foster
R3	9 January 1988	Bath City	H	4–0	5,080	Ryan, Charles (2), Withey (o.g.)
R4	30 January 1988	Wimbledon	H	1–2	10,642	Kent

=== League Cup ===
Round	Date	Opponent	Venue	Result	Attendance	Scorers
R1 1st leg	18 August 1987	Birmingham City	H	2–2	4,425	Stringfellow (2)
R1 2nd leg	25 August 1987	Birmingham City	A	1–0	6,054	Cassells
R2 1st leg	23 September 1987	Oxford United	A	1–1	4,651	Kent
R2 2nd leg	6 October 1987	Oxford United	H	0–2	6,295	

=== League Trophy ===
Round	Date	Opponent	Venue	Result	Attendance	Scorers
PR	13 October 1987	Doncaster Rovers	A	1–0	1,280	Lowery
PR	27 October 1987	Hartlepool United	H	3–2	2,170	Eves, Cassells, Smith (o.g.)
R1	19 January 1988	Scunthorpe United	H	1–0	3,637	Charles
QF	16 February 1988	Preston North End	A	1–2	5,332	Kent

== Squad statistics ==
- Squad list sourced from 1987–88 Mansfield Town F.C. season at the English National Football Archive (subscription required)

Pos.	Name	League		FA Cup		League Cup		League Trophy		Total	
Pos.	Name	Apps	Goals	Apps	Goals	Apps	Goals	Apps	Goals	Apps	Goals
GK	(England) Andy Beasley	8	0	0	0	0	0	1	0	9	0
GK	(England) Kevin Hitchcock	33	0	5	0	4	0	3	0	45	0
GK	(England) Eric Steele	5	0	0	0	0	0	0	0	5	0
DF	(England) Nicky Andersen	3(9)	0	0(1)	0	1	0	0	0	4(10)	0
DF	(England) Steve Chambers	1(7)	0	1	0	1(1)	0	0(1)	0	3(9)	0
DF	(England) Simon Coleman	44	2	5	0	4	0	4	0	57	2
DF	(England) George Foster	44	0	5	1	4	0	4	0	57	1
DF	(England) Paul Garner	14(5)	0	2	0	0	0	2	0	18(5)	0
DF	(England) Mike Graham	46	1	5	0	4	0	4	0	59	1
DF	(England) Tony Kenworthy	29(1)	0	3	0	1	0	1	0	34(1)	0
DF	(England) Craig McKernon	9(5)	0	2	0	0(3)	0	2	0	13(8)	0
DF	(England) John Ryan	30(2)	1	5	1	1	0	4	0	40(2)	2
MF	(England) Steve Charles	46	11	5	3	4	0	4	0	59	14
MF	(England) Jason Danskin	0	0	0(1)	0	0(1)	0	0	0	0(2)	0
MF	(England) David Hodges	21(1)	2	0(1)	0	2	0	1(1)	0	24(3)	2
MF	(England) Mark Kearney	4	0	0	0	2	0	0	0	6	0
MF	(England) Tony Lowery	44	0	5	1	4	0	4	1	57	2
MF	(England) Phil Stubbins	0	0	0	0	0	0	0(1)	0	0(1)	0
FW	(England) Keith Cassells	40	10	4	3	4	1	4	1	52	15
FW	(England) Mel Eves	3	0	0	0	0	0	1	1	4	1
FW	(England) Kevin Kent	45	10	5	3	4	1	4	2	58	16
FW	(England) Michael Marks	0(1)	0	0	0	0	0	0	0	0(1)	0
FW	(England) Gordon Owen	15(2)	3	0	0	0	0	0	0	15(2)	3
FW	(England) Ian Stringfellow	22(8)	8	3(1)	1	4	2	0(1)	0	29(10)	11
FW	(England) Neil Whatmore	0(4)	0	0	0	0	0	0	0	0(4)	0
FW	(England) Steve Williams	0(4)	0	0	0	0	0	0	0	0(4)	0
–	Own goals	–	0	–	1	–	0	–	1	–	2
