= 1986–87 Mansfield Town F.C. season =

Mansfield Town
1986–87 season
- Manager: Ian Greaves
- Stadium: Field Mill
- Third Division: 10th
- FA Cup: First Round
- League Cup: Second Round
- Football League Trophy: Winner

The 1986–87 season was Mansfield Town's 50th season in the Football League and 16th in the Third Division they finished in 10th position with 61 points. They also won the Football League Trophy after beating Bristol City in the final.

== Final league table ==
Pos	Team	Pld	W	D	L	GF	GA	GD	Pts
8	Walsall	46	22	9	15	80	67	+13	75
9	Blackpool	46	16	16	14	74	59	+15	64
10	Mansfield Town	46	15	16	15	52	55	−3	61
11	Brentford	46	15	15	16	64	66	−2	60
12	Port Vale	46	15	12	19	76	70	+6	57

== Results ==
=== Football League Third Division ===
Match	Date	Opponent	Venue	Result	Attendance	Scorers
1	23 August 1986	Doncaster Rovers	H	2–1	3,969	Kearney, Lowery
2	30 August 1986	Darlington	A	1–2	2,043	Cassells
3	7 September 1986	Chesterfield	H	1–1	4,797	Lowery
4	13 September 1986	Bristol Rovers	A	0–0	2,802	
5	16 September 1986	Bury	A	1–1	2,023	Garner
6	20 September 1986	Bournemouth	H	1–1	2,841	Chamberlain
7	27 September 1986	Carlisle United	A	2–1	2,817	Chamberlain (2)
8	30 September 1986	Gillingham	H	1–0	3,046	Stringfellow
9	4 October 1986	York City	A	3–1	4,158	Stringfellow, Kearney, Kent
10	11 October 1986	Brentford	H	1–0	3,456	Stringfellow
11	18 October 1986	Chester City	A	1–1	2,394	Stringfellow
12	1 November 1986	Rotherham United	A	2–2	3,385	Cassells, Kent
13	4 November 1986	Bristol City	A	0–0	6,407	
14	8 November 1986	Swindon Town	H	0–0	3,911	
15	22 November 1986	Bolton Wanderers	H	2–2	3,097	Garner, Lowery
16	25 November 1986	Newport County	H	1–0	2,321	Whatmore
17	29 November 1986	Walsall	A	0–2	5,702	
18	6 December 1986	Blackpool	H	1–1	2,935	Cassells
19	13 December 1986	Fulham	A	1–1	3,570	Lowery
20	21 December 1986	Wigan Athletic	H	1–5	3,038	Collins
21	26 December 1986	Notts County	A	0–0	8,820	
22	27 December 1986	Middlesbrough	H	1–1	5,042	Kearney
23	1 January 1987	Port Vale	H	0–1	3,053	
24	3 January 1987	Bolton Wanderers	H	1–0	5,058	Cassells
25	25 January 1987	Chesterfield	A	1–0	4,080	Cassells
26	31 January 1987	Bristol Rovers	H	5–0	2,719	Cassells (4), Whatmore
27	7 February 1987	Bury	H	1–3	3,052	Whatmore
28	14 February 1987	Bournemouth	A	1–4	5,261	Whatmore
29	17 February 1987	Doncaster Rovers	A	0–1	1,563	
30	21 February 1987	Carlisle United	H	2–0	2,083	Kearney, Kent
31	28 February 1987	Gillingham	A	0–2	4,251	
32	3 March 1987	Rotherham United	H	0–0	2,457	
33	7 March 1987	Blackpool	A	2–1	3,032	Kent, Lowery
34	14 March 1987	Chester City	H	2–3	2,742	Kent, Cassells
35	17 March 1987	Newport County	A	3–0	1,383	Moore, Cassells, Kearney
36	21 March 1987	Brentford	A	1–3	3,336	Cassells
37	28 March 1987	York City	H	1–1	2,331	Kearney
38	3 April 1987	Swindon Town	A	0–3	8,192	
39	11 April 1987	Bristol City	H	2–0	2,888	Kearney (2)
40	18 April 1987	Port Vale	A	2–3	2,625	Cassells (2)
41	21 April 1987	Notts County	A	1–2	6,094	Kent
42	25 April 1987	Wigan Athletic	A	0–3	3,395	
43	28 April 1987	Darlington	H	1–0	1,938	Cassells
44	2 May 1987	Walsall	H	2–0	3,395	Cassells, Kearney
45	4 May 1987	Middlesbrough	A	0–1	13,534	
46	9 May 1987	Fulham	H	1–1	2,761	Kearney

=== FA Cup ===
Round	Date	Opponent	Venue	Result	Attendance	Scorers
R1	16 November 1986	Darlington	A	1–2	2,119	Foster

=== League Cup ===
Round	Date	Opponent	Venue	Result	Attendance	Scorers
R1 1st leg	26 August 1986	Walsall	A	0–1	3,942	
R1 2nd leg	2 September 1986	Walsall	H	2–4	3,069	Cassells, Kent

=== League Trophy ===
Round	Date	Opponent	Venue	Result	Attendance	Scorers
PR	2 December 1986	Halifax Town	H	2–2	1,944	Chandler, Kent
PR	9 December 1986	Rotherham United	A	1–1	1,317	Chandler
R1	27 January 1987	York City	A	1–0	2,061	Whatmore
QF	24 February 1987	Bury	A	2–1	2,455	Lowery, Kent
SF	10 March 1987	Middlesbrough	A	1–0	11,754	Kearney
Northern Final 1st leg	8 April 1987	Chester City	H	2–0	7,697	Stringfellow, Cassells
Northern Final 2nd leg	15 April 1987	Chester City	A	0–1	8,187	
Final	24 May 1987	Bristol City	N	1–1 (5–4 pens)	58,586	Kent

== Squad statistics ==
- Squad list sourced from 1986–87 Mansfield Town F.C. season at the English National Football Archive (subscription required)

Pos.	Name	League		FA Cup		League Cup		League Trophy		Total	
Pos.	Name	Apps	Goals	Apps	Goals	Apps	Goals	Apps	Goals	Apps	Goals
GK	(England) Kevin Hitchcock	46	0	1	0	2	0	8	0	57	0
DF	(England) Nicky Andersen	5(2)	0	0	0	0	0	0	0	5(2)	0
DF	(England) Steve Chambers	4(1)	0	0	0	0	0	1	0	5(1)	0
DF	(England) Simon Coleman	2	0	0	0	0	0	0	0	2	0
DF	(England) George Foster	45	0	1	1	2	0	7	0	55	1
DF	(England) Paul Garner	21(1)	2	1	0	1	0	7(1)	0	30(2)	2
DF	(England) Mike Graham	40(1)	0	1	0	2	0	7	0	50(1)	0
DF	(England) Tony Kenworthy	36	0	1	0	2	0	6(1)	0	45(1)	0
DF	(England) David Logan	26	0	1	0	2	0	3	0	32	0
DF	(England) Craig McKernon	13(5)	0	0(1)	0	1	0	0	0	14(6)	0
DF	(England) Gary Pollard	14	0	0	0	0	0	4(1)	0	18(1)	0
DF	(England) Les Robinson	1(1)	0	0	0	0	0	0	0	1(1)	0
MF	(England) Jason Danskin	10	0	0	0	0	0	3	0	13	0
MF	(England) David Hodges	1(2)	0	0	0	0	0	0	0	1(2)	0
MF	(England) Mark Kearney	43	10	1	0	1	0	7(1)	1	52(1)	11
MF	(England) Tony Lowery	44	5	1	0	2	0	8	1	55	6
FW	(England) Keith Cassells	46	15	1	0	2	1	8	1	57	17
FW	(England) Neville Chamberlain	17(4)	3	0	0	2	0	1(1)	0	20(5)	3
FW	(England) Jeff Chandler	6	0	0	0	0	0	2	2	8	2
FW	(Republic of Ireland) Roddy Collins	4	1	0	0	0	0	0	0	4	1
FW	(England) Kevin Kent	46	7	1	0	2	1	8	3	57	11
FW	(England) John Moore	5	1	0	0	0	0	0	0	5	1
FW	(England) Richard Smith	1(1)	0	0	0	0	0	0	0	1(1)	0
FW	(England) Ian Stringfellow	12(10)	4	1	0	1	0	2(2)	1	16(12)	5
FW	(England) Neil Whatmore	15	4	0(1)	0	0	0	6	1	21(1)	4
FW	(England) Steve Williams	3(1)	0	0	0	0	0	0	0	3(1)	0
