= 1991–92 Mansfield Town F.C. season =

Mansfield Town
1991–92 season
- Manager: George Foster
- Stadium: Field Mill
- Fourth Division: 3rd
- FA Cup: First Round
- League Cup: First Round
- Football League Trophy: Preliminary Round

The 1991–92 season was Mansfield Town's 55th season in the Football League and 13th in the Fourth Division they finished in 3rd position with 77 points gaining an instant return to the Third tier.

== Final league table ==
Pos	Team	Pld	W	D	L	GF	GA	GD	Pts	Promotion or relegation
1	Burnley (C, P)	42	25	8	9	79	43	+36	83	Promotion to the Second Division (Note: From the 1992–93 season, the third tier - then known as the Third Division - was renamed to the Second Division, and the fourth tier - then known as the Fourth Division - was renamed to the Third Division.)
2	Rotherham United (P)	42	22	11	9	70	37	+33	77	Promotion to the Second Division
3	Mansfield Town (P)	42	23	8	11	75	53	+22	77	Promotion to the Second Division
4	Blackpool (O, P)	42	22	10	10	71	45	+26	76	Qualification for the Fourth Division play-offs
5	Scunthorpe United	42	21	9	12	64	59	+5	72	Qualification for the Fourth Division play-offs

(C) Champions; (O) Play-off winners; (P) Promoted

== Results ==
=== Football League Fourth Division ===
Match	Date	Opponent	Venue	Result	Attendance	Scorers
1	17 August 1991	Scarborough	A	0–0	2,343	
2	24 August 1991	Barnet	H	1–2	2,669	Charles
3	31 August 1991	Chesterfield	A	2–0	4,740	Ford, Holland
4	3 September 1991	Wrexham	H	3–0	1,966	Stringfellow, Wilkinson (2)
5	7 September 1991	Blackpool	H	1–1	2,630	Wilkinson
6	13 September 1991	Crewe Alexandra	A	2–1	4,667	Stant, Charles
7	17 September 1991	Carlisle United	A	2–1	1,803	Stant, Charles
8	27 September 1991	Halifax Town	A	3–1	2,026	Stant, Fee, Wilkinson
9	5 October 1991	Maidstone United	H	2–0	3,209	Stant, Wilkinson
10	12 October 1991	Rochdale	A	2–0	3,871	Stant, Holland
11	19 October 1991	Cardiff City	H	3–0	3,180	Fee, Wilkinson, Charles
12	26 October 1991	Scunthorpe United	A	4–1	3,610	Stant, Wilkinson (2), Charles
13	2 November 1991	Doncaster Rovers	H	2–2	4,186	Stant (2)
14	5 November 1991	Northampton Town	A	2–1	2,181	Fee, Angus (o.g.)
15	9 November 1991	Burnley	A	2–3	11,848	Wilkinson (2)
16	23 November 1991	Gillingham	H	4–3	3,287	Stant (2), Holland, Withe
17	30 November 1991	Walsall	H	3–1	3,398	Stant (2), Ford
18	21 December 1991	Barnet	A	0–2	4,209	
19	26 December 1991	Scarborough	H	1–2	4,022	Clarke
20	28 December 1991	Chesterfield	H	2–1	6,514	Holland, Stant
21	1 January 1992	Wrexham	A	2–3	2,442	Wilkinson (2)
22	4 January 1992	York City	A	2–1	2,666	Wilkinson, Holland
23	18 January 1992	Rotherham United	A	1–1	6,649	McLoughlin
24	31 January 1992	Cardiff City	A	2–3	8,265	McLoughlin, Stant
25	8 February 1992	Scunthorpe United	H	1–3	3,496	Spooner
26	11 February 1992	Walsall	A	3–3	2,963	Stant, Fairclough, O'Hara (o.g.)
27	15 February 1992	Hereford United	H	1–1	2,554	Spooner
28	25 February 1992	Hereford United	A	1–0	2,123	McLoughlin
29	29 February 1992	York City	H	5–2	3,294	Tutill (o.g.), Fee, Fairclough, Stant (2)
30	3 March 1992	Rotherham United	H	1–0	5,719	Stant
31	7 March 1992	Lincoln City	A	0–2	4,387	
32	10 March 1992	Northampton Town	H	2–0	2,854	Stant, Ford
33	14 March 1992	Doncaster Rovers	A	1–0	2,846	Ford
34	21 March 1992	Burnley	H	0–1	8,333	
35	24 March 1992	Lincoln City	H	0–0	3,610	
36	28 March 1992	Gillingham	A	0–2	2,583	
37	31 March 1992	Crewe Alexandra	H	4–3	3,113	Fairclough, Stant (2), Wilkinson
38	4 April 1992	Blackpool	A	1–2	6,055	Stant
39	11 April 1992	Carlisle United	H	2–1	3,088	Holland, Charles
40	21 April 1992	Halifax Town	H	3–2	3,940	Stant (3)
41	25 April 1992	Maidstone United	A	0–0	1,602	
42	2 May 1992	Rochdale	H	2–1	5,671	Stant, Stringfellow

=== FA Cup ===
Round	Date	Opponent	Venue	Result	Attendance	Scorers
R1	27 November 1991	Preston North End	H	0–1	7,509	

=== League Cup ===
Round	Date	Opponent	Venue	Result	Attendance	Scorers
R1 1st leg	20 August 1991	Blackpool	H	0–3	2,124	
R1 2nd leg	27 August 1991	Blackpool	A	2–4	2,115	Gray, Spooner

=== League Trophy ===
Round	Date	Opponent	Venue	Result	Attendance	Scorers
PR	15 October 1991	Wrexham	A	0–1	627	
PR	4 February 1991	Peterborough United	H	0–3	2,578	

== Squad statistics ==
- Squad list sourced from 1991–92 Mansfield Town F.C. season at the English National Football Archive (subscription required)

Pos.	Name	League		FA Cup		League Cup		League Trophy		Total	
Pos.	Name	Apps	Goals	Apps	Goals	Apps	Goals	Apps	Goals	Apps	Goals
GK	(England) Andy Beasley	9	0	0	0	1	0	0	0	10	0
GK	(England) Phil Kite	11	0	0	0	0	0	1	0	12	0
GK	(England) Jason Pearcey	22	0	1	0	1	0	1	0	25	0
DF	(England) Cliff Carr	20	0	0	0	0	0	2	0	22	0
DF	(England) Nicky Clarke	16	1	0	0	0	0	0(1)	0	16(1)	1
DF	(England) Wayne Fairclough	18(7)	3	0	0	0	0	1	0	19(7)	3
DF	(England) Greg Fee	33(1)	4	0	0	1	0	1	0	35(1)	4
DF	(England) Paul Fleming	38	0	1	0	2	0	2	0	43	0
DF	(England) George Foster	24	0	1	0	1	0	2	0	28	0
DF	(England) Kevin Gray	11(7)	0	1	0	2	1	1	0	15(7)	1
DF	(Scotland) Malcolm Murray	0(1)	0	0	0	0	0	0	0	0(1)	0
DF	(England) Chris Withe	10	1	1	0	2	0	0	0	13	1
MF	(Scotland) Gary Castledine	3(4)	0	0	0	0	0	0	0	3(4)	0
MF	(England) Steve Charles	40	6	1	0	2	0	2	0	45	6
MF	(Scotland) Martin Clark	7(2)	0	0	0	0	0	0	0	7(2)	0
MF	(England) Paul Holland	38	6	1	0	2	0	1	0	42	6
MF	(England) Steve Spooner	31	2	1	0	2	1	2	0	36	3
FW	(England) Gary Ford	39	4	1	0	2	0	2	0	44	4
FW	(England) Paul McLoughlin	10(2)	3	0	0	0	0	1	0	11(2)	3
FW	(England) Kevin Noteman	6	0	0	0	0	0	0	0	6	0
FW	(England) Phil Stant	39(1)	26	1	0	2	0	2	0	44(1)	26
FW	(England) Ian Stringfellow	7(10)	2	0	0	0(2)	0	0	0	7(12)	2
FW	(England) Steve Wilkinson	30	14	1	0	2	0	1	0	34	14
–	Own goals	–	3	–	0	–	0	–	0	–	3
