= 1985–86 Mansfield Town F.C. season =

Mansfield Town
1985–86 season
- Manager: Ian Greaves
- Stadium: Field Mill
- Fourth Division: 3rd
- FA Cup: First Round
- League Cup: Second Round
- Football League Trophy: Quarter Final

The 1985–86 season was Mansfield Town's 49th season in the Football League and 12th in the Fourth Division they finished in 3rd position with 81 points, gaining promotion back to the Third Division.

== Final league table ==
Pos	Team	Pld	W	D	L	GF	GA	GD	Pts	Promotion or relegation
1	Swindon Town (C, P)	46	32	6	8	82	43	+39	102	Promotion to the Third Division
2	Chester City (P)	46	23	15	8	83	50	+33	84	Promotion to the Third Division
3	Mansfield Town (P)	46	23	12	11	74	47	+27	81	Promotion to the Third Division
4	Port Vale (P)	46	21	16	9	67	37	+30	79	Promotion to the Third Division
5	Orient	46	20	12	14	79	64	+15	72	

(C) Champions; (P) Promoted

== Results ==
=== Football League Fourth Division ===
Match	Date	Opponent	Venue	Result	Attendance	Scorers
1	17 August 1985	Hereford United	H	4–0	2,357	Cassells (3), Chamberlain
2	24 August 1985	Port Vale	A	0–0	2,930	
3	27 August 1985	Halifax Town	H	2–0	3,299	Vinter, Chamberlain
4	31 August 1985	Northampton Town	A	0–1	2,739	
5	7 September 1985	Wrexham	H	1–1	3,081	Whatmore
6	14 September 1985	Aldershot	A	2–1	1,307	Cassells, Kearney
7	18 September 1985	Leyton Orient	H	1–1	1,307	Chamberlain
8	21 September 1985	Scunthorpe United	A	3–0	1,780	Whatmore, Vinter, Pollard
9	28 September 1985	Southend United	H	3–0	3,705	Kearney, Vinter, Westley (o.g.)
10	2 October 1985	Chester City	A	0–1	2,145	
11	5 October 1985	Cambridge United	A	2–4	1,957	Kearney, Chamberlain
12	12 October 1985	Colchester United	H	2–0	3,370	Luke, Chamberlain
13	19 October 1985	Exeter City	H	2–1	3,289	Kearney, Lowery
14	22 October 1985	Tranmere Rovers	A	2–1	1,540	Kearney, Chamberlain
15	26 October 1985	Torquay United	H	4–0	3,506	Lowery, Chamberlain, Whatmore (2)
16	2 November 1985	Hartlepool United	A	1–1	4,195	Chamberlain
17	5 November 1985	Burnley	A	1–2	2,020	Kearney
18	9 November 1985	Crewe Alexandra	H	2–2	3,245	Chamberlain, Kent
19	23 November 1985	Swindon Town	A	1–2	4,784	Ramsey (o.g.)
20	30 November 1985	Rochdale	H	3–2	2,593	Whatmore (2), Luke
21	14 December 1985	Peterborough United	A	2–4	3,128	Kent, Garner
22	22 December 1985	Port Vale	H	2–1	3,730	Kent, Garner
23	26 December 1985	Stockport County	H	4–2	3,730	Lowery (2), Garner, Chamberlain
24	1 January 1986	Preston North End	A	2–0	3,703	Cassells, Chamberlain
25	11 January 1986	Northampton Town	H	1–0	3,836	Kearney
26	18 January 1986	Hereford United	A	2–4	2,888	Kent, Logan
27	25 January 1986	Aldershot	H	2–0	3,100	Whatmore (2)
28	1 February 1986	Wrexham	A	2–1	1,360	Cassells, Vinter
29	8 February 1986	Exeter City	A	1–0	1,741	Kent
30	15 February 1986	Leyton Orient	A	1–0	3,713	Kent
31	4 March 1986	Chester City	H	0–0	3,957	
32	8 March 1986	Cambridge United	H	2–0	3,379	Cassells, Chamberlain
33	14 March 1986	Colchester United	A	0–0	1,959	
34	22 March 1986	Torquay United	A	2–1	1,655	Luke, Cassells
35	25 March 1986	Scunthorpe United	H	1–1	3,923	Garner
36	29 March 1986	Preston North End	H	2–3	3,736	Cassells, Chamberlain
37	31 March 1986	Stockport County	A	2–0	4,635	Cassells, Chamberlain
38	5 April 1986	Burnley	H	0–0	3,678	
39	11 April 1986	Crewe Alexandra	A	1–2	2,099	Kent
40	15 April 1986	Southend United	A	1–3	1,140	Lowery
41	19 April 1986	Swindon Town	H	1–1	8,420	Chamberlain
42	22 April 1986	Hartlepool United	H	4–0	5,545	Cassells (2), Chamberlain, Kelly (o.g.)
43	26 April 1986	Rochdale	A	1–1	1,936	Cassells
44	29 April 1986	Tranmere Rovers	H	0–0	3,477	
45	3 May 1986	Peterborough United	H	0–1	3,010	
46	5 May 1986	Halifax Town	A	2–1	3,414	Kent, Whatmore

=== FA Cup ===
Round	Date	Opponent	Venue	Result	Attendance	Scorers
R1	16 November 1985	Port Vale	H	1–1	5,207	Chamberlain
R1 Replay	18 November 1985	Port Vale	A	0–1	6,749	

=== League Cup ===
Round	Date	Opponent	Venue	Result	Attendance	Scorers
R1 1st leg	21 August 1985	Middlesbrough	H	2–0	3,179	Vinter, Chamberlain
R1 2nd leg	3 September 1985	Middlesbrough	A	4–4	4,051	Kearney, Vinter, Chamberlain, Graham
R2 1st leg	25 September 1985	Chelsea	H	2–2	6,018	Pollard, Cassells
R2 2nd leg	9 October 1985	Chelsea	A	0–2	11,664	

=== League Trophy ===
Round	Date	Opponent	Venue	Result	Attendance	Scorers
R1	21 January 1986	Doncaster Rovers	A	0–1	1,584	
R1	11 March 1986	Notts County	H	1–0	3,447	Lowery
R1 Replay	17 March 1986	Doncaster Rovers	H	4–2	2,895	Cassells, Chamberlain, Collins (2)
R1 Replay	20 March 1986	Notts County	A	1–0	2,409	Luke
QF	27 March 1986	Darlington	A	0–3	1,425	

== Squad statistics ==
- Squad list sourced from 1985–86 Mansfield Town F.C. season at the English National Football Archive (subscription required)

Pos.	Name	League		FA Cup		League Cup		League Trophy		Total	
Pos.	Name	Apps	Goals	Apps	Goals	Apps	Goals	Apps	Goals	Apps	Goals
GK	(England) Andy Beasley	0	0	0	0	0	0	2	0	2	0
GK	(England) Kevin Hitchcock	46	0	2	0	4	0	3	0	55	0
DF	(England) Nicky Andersen	0	0	0	0	0	0	0(2)	0	0(2)	0
DF	(England) Simon Coleman	0	0	0	0	0	0	1	0	1	0
DF	(England) George Foster	46	0	2	0	4	0	5	0	57	0
DF	(England) Mike Galloway	4(2)	0	0	0	0	0	0	0	4(2)	0
DF	(England) Paul Garner	28	4	0	0	1	0	5	0	34	4
DF	(England) Mike Graham	45	0	2	0	4	1	5	0	56	1
DF	(England) Bryn Gunn	5	0	0	0	0	0	0	0	5	0
DF	(England) Tony Kenworthy	13	0	0	0	0	0	3	0	16	0
DF	(England) David Logan	24	1	2	0	3	0	1	0	30	1
DF	(England) Craig McKernon	7(4)	0	0	0	0	0	3	0	10(4)	0
DF	(England) Gary Pollard	35	1	2	0	4	1	1	0	42	2
DF	(England) Les Robinson	6(1)	0	0	0	0	0	1	0	7(1)	0
MF	(Northern Ireland) John Cunningham	0	0	0	0	0	0	0(1)	0	0(1)	0
MF	(England) Mark Kearney	31	7	2	0	3	1	1	0	37	8
MF	(England) Tony Lowery	40	5	2	0	4	0	3(1)	1	49(1)	6
FW	(England) Keith Cassells	40	13	2	0	3	1	2	1	47	15
FW	(England) Neville Chamberlain	39(1)	16	2	1	4	2	4	1	49(1)	20
FW	(Republic of Ireland) Roddy Collins	7(5)	0	0	0	0	0	4	2	11(5)	2
FW	(England) Kevin Kent	31(3)	8	2	0	2	0	1(1)	0	36(4)	8
FW	(England) Noel Luke	8(6)	3	0	0	1(1)	0	3(1)	1	12(8)	4
FW	(England) Ian Stringfellow	0(3)	0	0	0	0	0	0	0	0(3)	0
FW	(England) Mick Vinter	21	4	1(1)	0	4	2	5	0	31(1)	6
FW	(England) Neil Whatmore	30(1)	9	1(1)	0	3	0	2(1)	0	36(3)	9
–	Own goals	–	3	–	0	–	0	–	0	–	3
