= 1984–85 Nottingham Forest F.C. season =

English football club season

Nottingham Forest
1984–85 season
- Chairman: Maurice Roworth
- Manager: Brian Clough
- Stadium: City Ground
- First Division: 9th
- FA Cup: Fourth round
- League Cup: Third round
- UEFA Cup: First round
- Top goalscorer: League: Peter Davenport (16); All: Peter Davenport (17)
Home colours	Away colours

The 1984–85 season was Nottingham Forest's 120th year in existence and 8th consecutive season in the First Division. Aside from the league, the club competed in the UEFA Cup, FA Cup and League Cup.

== Summary ==
In his tenth season as manager, Brian Clough, after several disagreements the previous season with Hans van Breukelen, transferred in another Dutch goalkeeper Hans Segers from PSV Eindhoven. Also, starter right back defender Viv Anderson left the club after nine seasons, being transferred out to Arsenal for £250,000. His spot for this campaign was covered by Kenny Swain who already was playing as a left back during the last two seasons. Swain was replaced by Scottish left back defender Jim McInally who delivered an outstanding performance during the season. Meanwhile, Clough transferred out Ian Wallace after a disappointing 1983–84 season, but Trevor Christie, his replacement was a flop, and left the club during Winter due to injuries. Birtles and Riley collapsed the offensive line, meaning Peter Davenport was the only striker with a decent outcome including 17 goals scored.

Clough reinforced the midfield with John Metgod; after his chaotic seasons in Real Madrid the Dutch player delivered a decent performance in a competitive line with Hodge, Bowyer, Wigley and Mills reinforcing the mid line during winter. However, the injuries (including Colin Walsh) and the mediocre performance of the strikers sink the squad to the 9th spot in League and early eliminations in UEFA Cup, League Cup and FA Cup. The season is best remembered due to the debut of forward Nigel Clough, son of the club manager, and the flop of midfielder Gary Megson, about whom Clough said "he couldn't trap a bag of cement". Megson spent five months at the City Ground, without making a single first-team appearance before being sold to Newcastle United.

== Squad ==
Note: Flags indicate national team as defined under FIFA eligibility rules; some limited exceptions apply. Players may hold more than one non-FIFA nationality.

Pos.	Nation	Player
GK	NED	Hans Segers
GK	ENG	Steve Sutton
GK	ENG	Darren Heyes
DF	ENG	Kenny Swain
DF	ENG	Bryn Gunn
DF	ENG	Chris Fairclough
DF	ENG	Mark Smalley
DF	ENG	Paul Hart
DF	ENG	Des Walker
DF	AUS	Alan Davidson
DF	ENG	Gary Fleming
DF	SCO	Jim McInally
MF	ENG	Ian Bowyer (c)
MF	NED	Johnny Metgod

Pos.	Nation	Player
MF	ENG	Franz Carr
MF	ENG	Paul Raynor
MF	NIR	David Campbell
MF	ENG	Gary Megson
MF	ENG	Gary Mills
MF	ENG	Steve Wigley
MF	SCO	Colin Walsh
MF	ENG	Steve Hodge
FW	ENG	Peter Davenport
FW	ENG	Garry Birtles
FW	ENG	David Riley
FW	ENG	David Longhurst
FW	ENG	Trevor Christie
FW	NIR	Paul Kee

=== Transfers ===
In
Pos.	Name	from	Type
GK	Hans Segers	PSV Eindhoven	£42,000
DF	Jim McInally	Celtic Glasgow	
MF	Johnny Metgod	Real Madrid	
FW	Trevor Christie	Notts County	
FW	Paul Kee	Mansfield Town F.C.	
MF	Gary Megson	Sheffield Wednesday	
MF	Franz Carr	Blackburn Rovers	£100,000
DF	Alan Davidson	South Melbourne FC	
MF	Paul Raynor		
DF	Gary Fleming		
MF	David Campbell		
GK	Darren Heyes		

Out
Pos.	Name	To	Type
DF	Viv Anderson	Arsenal	£210,000
FW	Ian Wallace	Brest	
GK	Hans van Breukelen	PSV Eindhoven	
GK	Kevin Hitchcock	Mansfield Town	loan
DF	Colin Todd	Oxford United	
MF	Danny Wilson	Brighton and Hove Albion	
DF	Nigel Johnson		
DF	Les Robinson		
DF	Adrian Shaw		
DF	Shaun Finney		

==== Winter ====
In
Pos.	Name	from	Type
FW	Nigel Clough		

Out
Pos.	Name	To	Type
MF	Gary Megson	Sheffield Wednesday	
FW	Trevor Christie	Derby County	

== Results ==
=== Division One ===
==== League table ====
Pos	Team	Pld	W	D	L	GF	GA	GD	Pts
7	Arsenal	42	19	9	14	61	49	+12	66
8	Sheffield Wednesday	42	17	14	11	58	45	+13	65
9	Nottingham Forest	42	19	7	16	56	48	+8	64
10	Aston Villa	42	15	11	16	60	60	0	56
11	Watford	42	14	13	15	81	71	+10	55

Source: World Football
Rules for classification: 1) Points; 2) Goal difference; 3) Goals scored

==== Results by round ====
Round	1	2	3	4	5	6	7	8	9	10	11	12	13	14	15	16	17	18	19	20	21	22	23	24	25	26	27	28	29	30	31	32	33	34	35	36	37	38	39	40	41	42
Ground	A	H	H	A	A	H	A	H	H	A	A	H	A	H	A	H	A	H	A	A	H	H	A	A	H	H	A	H	H	H	A	H	A	H	A	H	A	A	H	A	H	A
Result	L	W	W	W	L	W	D	W	D	L	D	L	L	L	W	W	L	W	L	W	W	W	L	W	W	W	L	D	L	D	W	L	L	W	D	W	W	L	D	L	W	L
Position	18	10	4	1	3	1	3	2	2	5	6	7	10	13	9	9	11	10	11	10	7	5	7	8	7	5	8	8	8	8	6	7	8	8	8	8	7	8	8	8	9	9

Source: https://www.11v11.com/teams/nottingham-forest/tab/matches/season/1985/
A = Away; H = Home; W = Win; D = Draw; L = Loss; = Champions, Qualified to 1985–86 European Cup; = Qualified to 1985–86 UEFA Cup; = Relegated to Division Two

On June 2, 1985 English teams were banned by UEFA from its competitions from the season 1985–86 on until the season 1990–91 because of the Heysel Disaster in 1985, involving Liverpool fans.

==== Matches ====
- .- Source: https://www.11v11.com/teams/nottingham-forest/tab/matches/season/1985/

25 August 1984 1	Sheffield Wednesday	3–1	Nottingham Forest	Sheffield
	Mel Sterland 19' (pen)' Imre Varadi 58'; John Pearson 81'		37' Peter Davenport	Stadium: Hillsborough; Attendance: 31,950; Referee: N Midgley

29 August 1984 2	Nottingham Forest	2–0	Arsenal	West Bridgford
	Johnny Metgod 63'; Peter Davenport 66'			Stadium: City Ground; Attendance: 18,215; Referee: D Scott

1 September 1984 3	Nottingham Forest	3–1	Sunderland	West Bridgford
	Peter Davenport 15', 53', 63'		19' (pen.) Colin West	Stadium: City Ground; Attendance: 15,760; Referee: VG Callow

5 September 1984 4	Aston Villa	0–5	Nottingham Forest	Birmingham
			33' Ian Bowyer; 60', 68', 88' Trevor Christie; 77' Steve Hodge	Stadium: Villa Park; Attendance: 17,730; Referee: JB Worrall

8 September 1984 5	Queens Park Rangers	3–0	Nottingham Forest	White City
	Wayne Fereday 4', 72'; Gary Bannister 19'			Stadium: Loftus Road; Attendance: 13,507; Referee: IJ Borrett

16 September 1984 6	Nottingham Forest	3–1	Luton Town	West Bridgford
	Steve Hodge 60', 76'; Peter Davenport 67'		82' David Moss	Stadium: City Ground; Attendance: 18,605; Referee: KA Redfern

22 September 1984 7	West Ham United	0–0	Nottingham Forest	Upton Park
				Stadium: Boleyn Ground; Attendance: 17,434; Referee: JE Martin

29 September 1984 8	Nottingham Forest	3–1	Norwich City	West Bridgford
	Dave Watson 22' (o.g.); Steve Hodge 88'; Trevor Christie 90'		87' Peter Mendham	Stadium: City Ground; Attendance: 15,166; Referee: PA Tyldesley

6 October 1984 9	Nottingham Forest	1–1	Stoke City	West Bridgford
	Peter Davenport 88' (pen.)		12' George Berry	Stadium: City Ground; Attendance: 14,129; Referee: T Mills

13 October 1984 10	West Bromwich Albion	4–1	Nottingham Forest	West Bromwich
	Steve Mackenzie 23'; Garry Thompson 52', 60', 83'		31' Ian Bowyer	Stadium: The Hawthorns; Attendance: 12,991; Referee: HW King

20 October 1984 11	Newcastle United	1–1	Nottingham Forest	Newcastle-upon-Tyne
	Ken Wharton 79'		45' Steve Hodge	Stadium: St James' Park; Attendance: 28,328; Referee: NL Wilson

28 October 1984 12	Nottingham Forest	0–2	Liverpool	West Bridgford
			34' Ronnie Whelan; 54' Ian Rush	Stadium: City Ground; Attendance: 19,838; Referee: G Courtney

3 November 1984 13	Southampton	1–0	Nottingham Forest	Southampton
	David Puckett 20'			Stadium: The Dell; Attendance: 17,818; Referee: C Downey

10 November 1984 14	Nottingham Forest	1–2	Tottenham Hotspur	West Bridgford
	Peter Davenport 57'		54' Micky Hazard; 74' Tony Galvin	Stadium: City Ground; Attendance: 21,406; Referee: NH Glover

17 November 1984 15	Coventry City	1–3	Nottingham Forest	Coventry
	Terry Gibson 56' (pen.)		42' (o.g.)Micky Adams; 77'Colin Walsh; 90'David Riley	Stadium: Highfield Road; Attendance: 9,840; Referee: K Walmsley

25 November 1984 16	Nottingham Forest	2–1	Leicester City	West Bridgford
	Peter Davenport 24', 29' (pen.)		20' Ian Banks	Stadium: City Ground; Attendance: 21,463; Referee: KS Hackett

1 December 1984 17	Watford	2–0	Nottingham Forest	Watford
	George Reilly 3'; Worrell Sterling 28'			Stadium: Vicarage Road; Attendance: 17,758; Referee: DA Hedges

8 December 1984 18	Nottingham Forest	3–2	Manchester United	West Bridgford
	Steve Hodge 62'; Gary Mills 77'; Johnny Metgod 90'		14' (pen.), 28' Gordon Strachan	Stadium: City Ground; Attendance: 25,902; Referee: AW Ward

15 December 1984 19	Everton	5–0	Nottingham Forest	Walton
	Graeme Sharp 20', 75'; Kevin Sheedy 32'; Trevor Steven 44'; Peter Reid 50'		(red card) 32' Chris Fairclough	Stadium: Goodison Park; Attendance: 22,453; Referee: MG Peck

23 December 1984 20	Sunderland	0–2	Nottingham Forest	Sunderland
			32'Trevor Christie; 89'Steve Wigley	Stadium: Roker Park; Attendance: 21,086; Referee: CN Seel

26 December 1984 21	Nottingham Forest	2–0	Ipswich Town	West Bridgford
	Steve Hodge 53'; Johnny Metgod 55'			Stadium: City Ground; Attendance: 17,123; Referee: TJ Holbrook

29 December 1984 22	Nottingham Forest	3–2	Aston Villa	West Bridgford
	Peter Davenport 41', 86' (pen.); Johnny Metgod 84'		Colin Gibson 17'; Paul Rideout 35'	Stadium: City Ground; Attendance: 17,676; Referee: IA Hendrick

1 January 1985 23	Chelsea	1–0	Nottingham Forest	Fulham
	Mickey Thomas 69'			Stadium: Stamford Bridge; Attendance: 21,552; Referee: DJ Axcell

2 February 1985 24	Norwich City	0–1	Nottingham Forest	Norwich
			87' Peter Davenport	Stadium: Carrow Road; Attendance: 13,753; Referee: M Dimblebee

9 February 1985 25	Nottingham Forest	2–0	Queens Park Rangers	West Bridgford
	Steve Hodge 80'; Johnny Metgod 86'			Stadium: City Ground; Attendance: 11,991; Referee: J McAulay

23 February 1985 26	Nottingham Forest	2–0	Southampton	West Bridgford
	Steve Hodge 24'; Peter Davenport 28' (pen.)			Stadium: City Ground; Attendance: 14,752; Referee: PW Vanes

2 March 1985 27	Liverpool	1–0	Nottingham Forest	Liverpool
	John Wark 49' (pen.)			Stadium: Anfield; Attendance: 35,696; Referee: TA Jones

9 March 1985 28	Nottingham Forest	0–0	Newcastle United	West Bridgford
				Stadium: City Ground; Attendance: 17,425; Referee: EJ Scales

16 March 1985 29	Nottingham Forest	1–2	West Bromwich Albion	West Bridgford
	Peter Davenport 55'		Nicky Cross 48'; Gary Owen 74'	Stadium: City Ground; Attendance: 12,663; Referee: D Hutchinson

20 March 1985 30	Nottingham Forest	0–0	Sheffield Wednesday	West Bridgford
				Stadium: City Ground; Attendance: 17,648; Referee: PN Willis

23 March 1985 31	Stoke City	1–4	Nottingham Forest	Stoke-on-Trent
	Steve Parkin 10'		27' Steve Hodge; 34' Paul Hart; 52' David Riley; 79' (pen.) Peter Davenport	Stadium: Victoria Ground; Attendance: 7,544; Referee: G Courtney

30 March 1985 32	Nottingham Forest	1–2	West Ham United	West Bridgford
	Steve Hodge 55'		20' Tony Cottee; 75' Paul Goddard	Stadium: City Ground; Attendance: 13,560; Referee: GM Tyson

6 April 1985 33	Ipswich Town	1–0	Nottingham Forest	Ipswich
	Alan Sunderland 30'			Stadium: Portman Road; Attendance: 16,497; Referee: AN Buksh

10 April 1985 34	Nottingham Forest	2–0	Chelsea	West Bridgford
	Garry Birtles 49'; Johnny Metgod 54'			Stadium: City Ground; Attendance: 14,666; Referee: T Fitzharris

13 April 1985 35	Arsenal	1–1	Nottingham Forest	Islington
	Ian Allinson 82'		5' Gary Mills	Stadium: Highbury; Attendance: 24,151; Referee: JC Deakin

20 April 1985 36	Nottingham Forest	2–0	Coventry City	West Bridgford
	Gary Mills 25'; Ken Hibbitt 40' (o.g.)			Stadium: City Ground; Attendance: 12,990; Referee: J Lovatt

24 April 1985 37	Luton Town	1–2	Nottingham Forest	Luton
	David Moss 18' (pen.)		2' Gary Mills; 89' Steve Hodge	Stadium: Kenilworth Road; Attendance: 10,156; Referee: B Hill

27 April 1985 38	Leicester City	1–0	Nottingham Forest	Leicester
	Lineker 32'			Stadium: Filbert Street; Attendance: 13,886; Referee: BT Stevens

4 May 1985 39	Nottingham Forest	1–1	Watford	West Bridgford
	Nigel Clough 86'		29'Colin West	Stadium: City Ground; Attendance: 12,649; Referee: T Simpson

6 May 1985 40	Manchester United	2–0	Nottingham Forest	Manchester
	John Gidman 8'; Frank Stapleton 67'			Stadium: Old Trafford; Attendance: 41,775; Referee: MG Peck

11 May 1985 41	Nottingham Forest	1–0	Everton	West Bridgford
	Garry Birtles 10'			Stadium: City Ground; Attendance: 18,784; Referee: T Mills

17 May 1985 42	Tottenham Hotspur	1–0	Nottingham Forest	Tottenham
	Mark Falco 22'			Stadium: White Hart Lane; Attendance: 20,075; Referee: LC Shapter

=== UEFA Cup ===
19 September 1984 1st	Nottingham Forest (England)	0–0	(Belgium) Club Brugge KV	Nottingham
				Stadium: City Ground; Attendance: 18,307

3 October 1984 1st	Club Brugge KV (Belgium)	1–0 (1–0 agg.)	(England) Nottingham Forest
	Willy Wellens 89'			Attendance: 20,000

=== League Cup ===
25 September 1984 2	Portsmouth (Div 2)	1–0	Nottingham Forest
	Alan Biley 65'			Attendance: 20,409; Referee: RS Lewis

10 October 1984 2	Nottingham Forest	3–0 (a.e.t.) (3–1 agg.)	Portsmouth	Nottingham
	Steve Hodge 46'; Steve Wigley 92'; Bryn Gunn 95'			Stadium: City Ground; Attendance: 18,128; Referee: RF Nixon

31 October 1984 3	Nottingham Forest	1–1	Sunderland	Nottingham
	David Hodgson 21'		Trevor Christie 44'	Stadium: City Ground; Attendance: 14,291; Referee: D Shaw

6 November 1984 3	Sunderland	1–0 (a.e.t.)	Nottingham Forest
	Howard Gayle 110'			Attendance: 23,184; Referee: RA Banks

=== FA Cup ===
6 January 1985 3	Nottingham Forest	1–1	Newcastle United	Nottingham
	Ian Bowyer 69'		36' Gary Megson	Stadium: City Ground; Attendance: 23,582; Referee: JB Worrall

9 January 1985 3	Newcastle United	1–3 (a.e.t.)	Nottingham Forest
	Chris Waddle 64'		29' (pen.)Peter Davenport; 107' Ian Bowyer; 110'Trevor Christie	Attendance: 25,166; Referee: JB Worrall

26 January 1985 4	Nottingham Forest	0–0	Wimbledon	Nottingham
				Stadium: City Ground; Attendance: 17,184; Referee: N Midgley

30 January 1985 4	Wimbledon	1–0	Nottingham Forest
	Paul Fishenden 12'			Attendance: 10,348; Referee: N Midgley

== Statistics ==
=== Squad statistics ===
No.	Pos	Nat	Player	Total		Football League Division One		FA Cup		Other	
No.	Pos	Nat	Player	Apps	Goals	Apps	Goals	Apps	Goals	Apps	Goals
	GK	(Netherlands) NED	Hans Segers	32	0	28	0	4	0	0	0
	DF	(England) ENG	Kenny Swain	47	0	39	0	2	0	6	0
	DF	(England) ENG	Chris Fairclough	45	0	35	0	4	0	6	0
	DF	(England) ENG	Paul Hart	38	1	34	1	2	0	2	0
	DF	(Scotland) SCO	Jim McInally	28	0	24	0	4	0	0	0
	MF	(England) ENG	Steve Wigley	44	2	34+1	1	4	0	4+1	1
	MF	(England) ENG	Ian Bowyer	49	4	39	2	4	2	6	0
	MF	(England) ENG	Gary Mills	31	4	18+8	4	0	0	3+2	0
	MF	(Netherlands) NED	Johnny Metgod	50	6	40	6	4	0	6	0
	MF	(England) ENG	Steve Hodge	51	13	42	12	4	0	5	1
	FW	(England) ENG	Peter Davenport	44	17	35	16	4	1	5	0
	GK	(England) ENG	Steve Sutton	20	0	14	0	0	0	6	0
	DF	(England) ENG	Bryn Gunn	24	1	17	0	2	0	5	1
	FW	(England) ENG	Trevor Christie	20	7	14	5	2	1	4	1
	FW	(England) ENG	Garry Birtles	15	2	12+1	2	2	0	0	0
	MF	(Scotland) SCO	Colin Walsh	18	1	10+3	1	0+1	0	4	0
	FW	(England) ENG	Nigel Clough	9	1	8+1	1	0	0	0	0
	FW	(England) ENG	David Riley	11	2	7+3	2	0	0	1	0
	DF	(Australia) AUS	Alan Davidson	5	0	3	0	2	0	0	0
	MF	(England) ENG	Paul Raynor	4	0	3	0	0	0	1	0
	DF	(England) ENG	Des Walker	3	0	3	0	0	0	0	0
	DF	(Northern Ireland) NIR	Gary Fleming	2	0	2	0	0	0	0	0
	DF	(England) ENG	Mark Smalley	3	0	1	0	0	0	2	0
	MF	(Northern Ireland) NIR	David Campbell	1	0	0+1	0	0	0	0	0
	GK	(England) ENG	Darren Heyes	0	0	0	0	0	0	0	0
	FW	(Northern Ireland) NIR	Paul Kee	0	0	0	0	0	0	0	0
	MF	(England) ENG	Gary Megson	0	0	0	0	0	0	0	0
	MF	(England) ENG	Franz Carr								

- Source: https://www.11v11.com/teams/nottingham-forest/tab/players/season/1985/
