= Gary Ford =

English footballer

Personal information
- Full name: Gary Ford
- Date of birth: 8 February 1961 (age 65)
- Place of birth: York, England
- Height: 5 ft 8 in (1.73 m)
- Position: Winger

Youth career
- Leeman United
- 1977–1979: York City

Senior career*
Years	Team	Apps	(Gls)
1979–1987	York City	366	(53)
1987	Leicester City	16	(2)
1987–1991	Port Vale	75	(12)
1990	→ Walsall (loan)	13	(2)
1991–1993	Mansfield Town	88	(6)
1993	Telford United		
1993	Tromsø IL		
1994–1995	Harstad IL		
1995	Hartlepool United	3	(0)
Total		561	(75)
- * Club domestic league appearances and goals

Gary Ford (born 8 February 1961) is an English former footballer who played on the right-wing.

He made 435 appearances in all competitions for York City, scoring 64 goals, between 1979 and 1987 – a tally beaten by only four York City players. He then moved on to Port Vale via Leicester City. He played on loan for Walsall before signing with Mansfield Town in 1991. Two years later he joined Telford United, before heading to Norway with Tromsø IL and Harstad IL, before returning to England with Hartlepool United in 1995.

== Career ==
=== York City ===
Ford started playing with a small York-based team, Leeman United, then became professional with York City at 18 years of age in February 1979, following a two-year apprenticeship. The "Minstermen" were a mid-table Fourth Division team in 1978–79, but were only three points above the re-election zone in 1979–80. They finished bottom of the Football League in 1980–81, leading to Barry Lyons's departure as manager, before rising to 17th place in 1981–82. Following the arrival of a new boss Denis Smith, York posted a seventh-place finish in 1982–83, lying just three places and four points outside the promotion places. They then ran away with the Fourth Division title in 1983–84, racking up 101 points and a goal difference ratio of +57. They finished eighth in the Third Division in 1984–85 and seventh in 1985–86, but only avoided relegation in 1986–87 by one place and four points. During his eight years at Bootham Crescent, Ford made 435 appearances in league and cup competitions.

=== Leicester City ===
After making a £25,000 transfer to Leicester City, Ford scored twice in 16 Second Division appearances for the "Foxes" in 1987–88, before losing his place when Bryan Hamilton was replaced as manager by David Pleat.

=== Port Vale ===
Ford was bought by Port Vale in December 1987 for a £35,000 fee, dropping down into the Third Division to join John Rudge's "Valiants". On 30 January 1988, he helped Vale to beat Tottenham Hotspur 2–1 in the fourth round of the FA Cup at Vale Park and described it as "one of the best games of my life". He scored three goals in 28 games in 1987–88. However, he tore an Achilles tendon in November 1988 and struggled to make the first-team until he underwent an operation to correct it in September 1989. He hit eight goals in 28 games in 1988–89, but his injury ruled him out of the play-off final victory over Bristol Rovers. He recovered by March 1990 and went out to Walsall on loan, making 13 appearances for John Barnwell's "Saddlers" as they battled unsuccessfully to avoid finishing last in the Third Division. During the 1990–91 season he was in action fairly frequently, scoring twice in 35 appearances, but was transferred to George Foster's Mansfield Town in March 1991, along with £80,000, in exchange for Kevin Kent.

=== Later career ===
After moving on to Telford United in 1993, Ford moved to Norway and plied his trade for Tromsø IL and Harstad IL. Tromsø finished sixth in the Tippeligaen in 1993 under the stewardship of Harald Aabrekk. Harstad finished fifth in the Norwegian Second Division in 1994, before winning promotion as Group 6 champions in 1995. He then returned to England and the Football League in 1995, making three appearances for Hartlepool United, before retiring due to injury. He went on to work as a youth coach at York City and at York University.

== Style of play ==
Ford was a winger known for his intelligent wide play and consistency.

== Career statistics ==
Appearances and goals by club, season and competition
Club	Season	League			FA Cup		Other		Total	
Club	Season	Division	Apps	Goals	Apps	Goals	Apps	Goals	Apps	Goals
York City	1978–79	Fourth Division	33	4	5	1	0	0	38	5
York City	1979–80	Fourth Division	29	2	3	0	2	0	34	2
York City	1980–81	Fourth Division	43	4	2	0	4	1	49	5
York City	1981–82	Fourth Division	41	8	3	1	2	0	46	9
York City	1982–83	Fourth Division	45	11	4	2	2	0	51	13
York City	1983–84	Fourth Division	46	11	3	0	3	1	52	12
York City	1984–85	Third Division	44	5	6	0	7	2	57	7
York City	1985–86	Third Division	40	4	7	3	6	0	53	7
York City	1986–87	Third Division	45	4	3	0	7	0	55	4
York City	Total		366	53	36	7	33	4	435	64
Leicester City	1987–88	Second Division	16	2	0	0	4	1	20	3
Port Vale	1987–88	Third Division	23	3	4	0	1	0	28	3
Port Vale	1988–89	Third Division	22	7	1	0	5	1	28	8
Port Vale	1989–90	Second Division	0	0	0	0	0	0	0	0
Port Vale	1990–91	Second Division	30	2	2	0	3	0	35	2
Port Vale	Total		75	12	7	0	9	1	91	13
Walsall (loan)	1989–90	Third Division	13	2	0	0	0	0	13	2
Mansfield Town	1990–91	Third Division	12	1	0	0	0	0	12	1
Mansfield Town	1991–92	Fourth Division	39	4	1	0	6	0	46	4
Mansfield Town	1992–93	Second Division	37	1	1	0	4	0	42	1
Mansfield Town	Total		88	6	2	0	10	0	100	6
Hartlepool United	1995–96	Third Division	3	0	0	0	1	0	4	0
Career total			561	75	45	7	57	6	663	88

== Honours ==
York City

- Football League Fourth Division: 1983–84

Harstad IL

- Norwegian Second Division Group 6: 1995
