= Kevin Kent =

English footballer and coach (born 1965)

Personal information
- Full name: Kevin Joseph Kent
- Date of birth: 19 March 1965 (age 61)
- Place of birth: Stoke-on-Trent, England
- Height: 5 ft 11 in (1.80 m)
- Position: Winger

Youth career
- 1979–1983: West Bromwich Albion

Senior career*
Years	Team	Apps	(Gls)
1983–1984	West Bromwich Albion	2	(0)
1984–1985	Newport County	33	(1)
1985–1991	Mansfield Town	229	(37)
1991–1996	Port Vale	114	(7)
Total		378	(45)
- * Club domestic league appearances and goals

Kevin Joseph Kent (born 19 March 1965) is an English former professional football player and coach.

Kent began his career as a winger at West Bromwich Albion in 1983. The following year, he began playing regular football with Newport County. He then played for Mansfield Town over six years from 1985 to 1991. He then transferred to Port Vale, where he finished his career following five years. Over a 13-year professional career, he played 454 games, scoring 57 goals (claiming 45 goals in 379 appearances in the Football League). He won the Football League Trophy both with Mansfield (1987) and Port Vale (1993), and helped the "Stags" to win promotion out of the Fourth Division (1985–86) and the "Valiants" to win promotion out of the Second Division (1993–94).

== Early life ==
Kevin Joseph Kent was born on 19 March 1965 in Trent Vale, Stoke-on-Trent. His father was a season ticket holder at both Port Vale and Stoke City.

== Playing career ==
=== West Bromwich Albion ===
At age 14, Kent signed on schoolboy terms with West Bromwich Albion. He made two First Division appearances under Ron Wylie and Johnny Giles in the 1983–84 campaign. He then left The Hawthorns and signed for Newport County of the Third Division. A late bid from Birmingham City failed as the move to Newport had already been confirmed.

=== Newport County ===
Kent had been approached to sign for Newport by manager Colin Addison, who had previously been the assistant manager at West Brom. Kent played 33 league games for the "Exiles" in 1984–85, before leaving Rodney Parade to join Mansfield Town.

=== Mansfield Town ===
Kent helped Ian Greaves's side to win promotion out of the Fourth Division with a third-place finish in 1985–86. In 1986–87 he scored ten goals in 57 games and wrote his name in the club's history books on 24 May 1987, when he became the first (and to date, the only) player in Mansfield's history to score at Wembley when the "Stags" won the Football League Trophy after beating Bristol City on penalties following a 1–1 draw (he also successfully converted his penalty). He scored 15 goals in 58 games in the 1987–88 campaign. Mansfield posted a 15th-place finish in 1988–89, before new boss George Foster led the club to another 15th-place finish in 1989–90. They were demoted back into the basement division after a last-place finish in 1990–91. Kent played 276 first-team games and scored 47 goals in his six seasons at Field Mill. Mansfield told him they would accept a minimum offer of £150,000 for him so he wrote a letter to all 92 clubs in the Football League to inform them of his availability and received interest from Port Vale and Reading.

=== Port Vale ===
In March 1991, Kent joined Port Vale in exchange for Gary Ford and £80,000. He featured in 11 Second Division games at the end of the 1990–91 season, but featured just 25 times in the 1991–92 campaign, as the "Valiants" suffered relegation with a last place finish. He played 28 Third Division (renamed the Second Division due to the creation of the Premier League) games in the 1992–93 season; he did though play 40 games in total throughout the campaign, as he helped the Vale to win the TNT Tournament, the Football League Trophy, and to reach the play-off final. They beat Stockport County in the Football League Trophy final, but lost 3–0 to West Bromwich Albion in the play-off final. Manager John Rudge ensured his side made up for their failure to win the play-offs by leading them to promotion as the division's runners-up in 1993–94. However, injuries soon brought Kent's career to a halt; he fractured his hand in October 1994 and his kneecap the following February and was hospitalised in May 1995 with a back injury; this final injury brought about his early retirement at the end of the 1995–96 season. On his retirement he became a coaching assistant at Vale Park.

== Coaching career ==
Whilst at his final club, Port Vale, Kent began working as a coach at the club's Centre of Excellence from 1993 to 1996 and 2004 to 2006 under Mark Grew, Brian Horton and Martin Foyle. Before this he gained experience at Mansfield Town's Centre of Excellence under Ian Greaves. From 2005 to 2007 he worked at Stoke City's academy, before beginning a short coaching stint at Manchester United after obtaining his UEFA A Licence. Between 2009 and 2011 he worked as the Indonesian Football Association's National Academy Director. He also worked as a manager at Barclays Bank Sports Facilities and Events department between 1997 and 2009 and provided commentary for BBC Radio Stoke. He worked on an initiative to bring former players back to Vale Park as matchday guests in 2025.

== Career statistics ==
Appearances and goals by club, season and competition
Club	Season	League			FA Cup		Other^{[A]}		Total	
Club	Season	Division	Apps	Goals	Apps	Goals	Apps	Goals	Apps	Goals
West Bromwich Albion	1983–84	First Division	2	0	0	0	0	0	2	0
Newport County	1984–85	Third Division	33	1	1	0	5	1	39	2
Mansfield Town	1985–86	Fourth Division	34	8	2	0	4	0	40	8
Mansfield Town	1986–87	Third Division	46	7	1	0	10	4	57	11
Mansfield Town	1987–88	Third Division	45	10	5	3	8	3	58	16
Mansfield Town	1988–89	Third Division	39	5	2	1	2	0	43	6
Mansfield Town	1989–90	Third Division	38	3	1	0	4	0	43	3
Mansfield Town	1990–91	Third Division	27	4	2	0	5	0	34	4
Mansfield Town	Total		229	37	13	4	33	7	275	48
Port Vale	1990–91	Second Division	11	0	0	0	0	0	11	0
Port Vale	1991–92	Second Division	22	0	0	0	3	0	25	0
Port Vale	1992–93	Second Division	27	1	0	0	10	0	37	1
Port Vale	1993–94	Second Division	30	4	2	0	4	0	36	4
Port Vale	1994–95	First Division	23	2	0	0	4	0	27	2
Port Vale	1995–96	First Division	1	0	0	0	0	0	1	0
Port Vale	Total		114	7	2	0	21	0	137	7
Career total			378	45	16	4	59	8	453	57

A. The "Other" column constitutes appearances and goals in the League Cup, Football League Trophy, Football League play-offs and Full Members' Cup.

== Honours ==
Mansfield Town

- Associate Members' Cup: 1986–87

Port Vale

- Football League Trophy: 1992–93
