= Gary McDonald =

Gary McDonald may refer to:

- Gary McDonald (footballer, born 1969), English footballer
- Gary McDonald (footballer, born 1982), Scottish footballer
- Gary McDonald (actor) (born 1961), English actor
- Gary McDonald (Australian footballer) (born 1953), former Australian rules footballer
- Gary McDonald (racing driver), American stock car racing driver

== See also ==
- Gary MacDonald (disambiguation)
- Garry McDonald (born 1948), Australian actor
- Garry MacDonald (cricketer) (born 1956), New Zealand cricketer
