= Gary MacDonald =

Gary MacDonald may refer to:

- Gary MacDonald (footballer) (born 1979), English footballer
- Gary MacDonald (swimmer) (born 1953), Canadian swimmer
- Gary Macdonald, a fictional character on the TV program Saturday Night Live

== See also ==
- Gary McDonald (disambiguation)
- Garry MacDonald, English footballer
- Garry McDonald (born 1948), Australian actor
