= John Clark (footballer, born 1941) =

Scottish footballer (1941–2025)

Personal information
- Date of birth: 13 March 1941
- Place of birth: Chapelhall, Scotland
- Date of death: 23 June 2025 (aged 84)
- Position: Left half

Youth career
- Larkhall Thistle

Senior career*
Years	Team	Apps	(Gls)
1958–1971	Celtic	182	(1)
1971–1973	Morton	54	(0)
Total		236	(1)

International career
1966–1967	Scotland	4	(0)
1966–1967	Scottish League XI	2	(0)

Managerial career
- 1977–1978: Aberdeen (assistant)
- 1978–1983: Celtic (assistant)
- 1984–1985: Cowdenbeath
- 1986: Stranraer
- 1987–1992: Clyde
- * Club domestic league appearances and goals

John Clark (13 March 1941 – 23 June 2025) was a Scottish football player and coach. He was employed by Celtic for fifty years over eight decades, as a player from 1958 to 1971, then having spells as a coach, assistant manager and then kit manager.

Clark was a member of the Celtic team which won the European Cup in 1967, nicknamed the Lisbon Lions. He was inducted into the Scottish Football Hall of Fame in 2017.

== Playing career ==
John Clark was born in Chapelhall, Lanarkshire. His father died in a railway accident when Clark was 10 years old. As a 15-year-old, Clark worked in a mine, before he joined Celtic in 1958, aged 17.

Clark soon established himself as a regular in the Celtic team. The arrival of Jock Stein as manager in 1965 saw Clark moved from left half to a sweeper position behind Billy McNeill. His undramatic style of play beside fellow centre back McNeill was integral to the success of the team; his role as Celtic's sweeper earned him the nickname "The Brush."

Between April 1965 and September 1967, the club's most successful period, he played in 140 consecutive matches. He was part of the Celtic team that won the European Cup in 1967, defeating Inter Milan 2–1 in Lisbon. With that triumph, Celtic's 'Lisbon Lions' also became the first European Treble winners and the only Quadruple winners to date. Clark was one of just two Lisbon Lions to appear in all 59 matches in major competitions, the other being Tommy Gemmell. As a player with Celtic, he won three league championships, three Scottish Cups, four League Cups and the European Cup.

He left Celtic for Morton in 1971, where he retired from playing two years later.

Clark earned four international caps for Scotland, all during his time with Celtic.

== Coaching and managerial career ==
Clark became a coach with Celtic in 1973, working with the reserve team.

He left in 1977 to become Billy McNeill's assistant manager at Aberdeen, before returning to Celtic in the same role with McNeill from 1978 to 1983. During McNeill's tenure, Celtic won three League championships, in 1978–79, 1980–81 and 1981–82, the Scottish Cup in 1980 and the League Cup in 1982–83.

Clark then worked as manager of Cowdenbeath, Stranraer and Clyde, as well as junior club Shotts Bon Accord, in the 1980s and early 90s. He became Celtic's kit manager in 1997, a position he held for over twenty years. He spent 50 years with Celtic across eight decades, making him the second-longest serving Celtic man ever, after Willie Maley.

== Personal life and death ==
His son Martin also became a professional footballer, playing with Clyde, Nottingham Forest and Partick Thistle in the 1990s.

Clark died on 23 June 2025, at the age of 84.

== Career statistics ==
Appearances and goals by national team and year
National team	Year	Apps	Goals
Scotland	1966	3	0
Scotland	1967	1	0
Total		4	0
