= Michael Marks (footballer) =

English footballer

Personal information
- Full name: Michael David Marks
- Date of birth: 23 March 1968 (age 58)
- Place of birth: Lambeth, England
- Position: Forward

Senior career*
Years	Team	Apps	(Gls)
1986–1988	Millwall	36	(10)
1988	→ Mansfield Town (loan)	1	(0)
1988	Leyton Orient	3	(0)
1988–1991	Fisher Athletic		
Total		40	(10)
- * Club domestic league appearances and goals

Michael David Marks (born 23 March 1968) is an English former professional footballer who played in the Football League as a forward.
