= Richard Smith (footballer, born 1967) =

English footballer

Personal information
- Full name: Richard Francis Smith
- Date of birth: 22 October 1967 (age 59)
- Place of birth: Reading, England
- Position: Winger

Senior career*
Years	Team	Apps	(Gls)
1985–1986	Wolverhampton Wanderers	1	(0)
1986	Moor Green		
1986–1987	Mansfield Town	2	(0)
1987	Alvechurch		
Total		3	(0)
- * Club domestic league appearances and goals

Richard Francis Smith (born 22 October 1967) is an English former professional footballer who played in the Football League for Mansfield Town and Wolverhampton Wanderers.
