= Steve O'Hara =

English footballer

Personal information
- Full name: Stephen O'Hara
- Date of birth: 21 February 1971 (age 55)
- Place of birth: Lanark, Scotland
- Position: Full back

Senior career*
Years	Team	Apps	(Gls)
1989–1994	Walsall	122	(4)
Total		122	(4)
- * Club domestic league appearances and goals

Stephen O'Hara (born 21 February 1971) is a Scottish former professional footballer who played in the Football League for Walsall.
