= Steve Prindiville =

English footballer (born 1968)

Personal information
- Full name: Steve Alan Prindiville
- Date of birth: 26 January 1968 (age 58)
- Place of birth: Harlow, England
- Position: Full back

Senior career*
Years	Team	Apps	(Gls)
1987–1988	Leicester City	1	(0)
1988–1989	Chesterfield	43	(1)
1989–1991	Mansfield Town	28	(0)
1991	East Bengal		
1991	Hinckley Athletic		
1991	Leicester United		
1992–1993	Doncaster Rovers	59	(2)
1993	Wycombe Wanderers	0	(0)
1993–1995	Halifax Town		
1995–1996	Dagenham & Redbridge		
1996–1999	Kidderminster Harriers		
1999–2001	Nuneaton Borough		
2001	Stafford Rangers		
Total		131	(3)
- * Club domestic league appearances and goals

Steve Alan Prindiville (born 26 December 1968) is an English former professional footballer who played in the Football League for Chesterfield, Doncaster Rovers, Leicester City and Mansfield Town.
