= Mark Place =

English footballer

Personal information
- Full name: Mark Gerald Place
- Date of birth: 16 November 1969 (age 56)
- Place of birth: Mansfield, England
- Position: Full back

Senior career*
Years	Team	Apps	(Gls)
1988–1990	Mansfield Town	15	(0)
1990–1991	Doncaster Rovers	1	(0)
1991	Eastwood Town		
Total		16	(0)
- * Club domestic league appearances and goals

Mark Gerald Place (born 16 November 1969) is an English former professional footballer who played in the Football League for Doncaster Rovers and Mansfield Town.
