= John Ryan (footballer, born 1962) =

English footballer

Personal information
- Full name: John Bernard Ryan
- Date of birth: 18 February 1962 (age 64)
- Place of birth: Ashton-under-Lyne, England
- Height: 5 ft 10 in (1.78 m)
- Position: Left back

Senior career*
| Years | Team | Apps | (Gls) |
| 1981–1983 | Oldham Athletic | 77 | (8) |
| 1983–1985 | Newcastle United | 28 | (1) |
| 1984–1985 | Sheffield Wednesday | 8 | (1) |
| 1985–1987 | Oldham Athletic | 23 | (0) |
| 1987–1989 | Mansfield Town | 62 | (1) |
| 1989–1991 | Chesterfield | 82 | (6) |
| 1991–1993 | Rochdale | 70 | (2) |
| 1993–1994 | Bury | 0 | (0) |
| | Stalybridge Celtic | ? | (?) |
| | Radcliffe Borough | ? | (?) |
| Total | | 350 | (19) |

International career
| 1983 | England U21 | 1 | (0) |
- * Club domestic league appearances and goals

John Bernard Ryan (born 18 February 1962) is an English footballer who played as a left back in the Football League. Equally adept at left full back or left wing, is still fondly remembered at Boundary Park where he was a firm fan favourite.

Ryan transferred to Sheffield Wednesday in exchange for Pat Heard plus £40,000.
