= Greg Fee =

English footballer and manager

Personal information
- Date of birth: 24 June 1964 (age 62)
- Place of birth: Halifax, England
- Position: Central defender

Senior career*
Years	Team	Apps	(Gls)
1982–1984	Bradford City	7	(0)
1984–1986	Kettering Town		
1986–1987	Boston United		
1987–1990	Sheffield Wednesday	26	(0)
1990	→ Preston North End (loan)	15	(0)
1990	→ Northampton Town (loan)	1	(0)
1990	→ Leyton Orient (loan)	5	(0)
1990–1993	Mansfield Town	54	(7)
1992	Chesterfield	10	(0)
1993–1998	Boston United		
- Telford United
- Emley
- Gainsborough Trinity
- Hucknall Town
- Heanor Town
Total		118	(7)

Managerial career
- 1996–1998: Boston United
- 2000: Gainsborough Trinity
- * Club domestic league appearances and goals

Greg Fee (born 24 June 1964) is an English former professional footballer who played as a central defender.

== Career ==
Born in Halifax, Fee played for Bradford City, Kettering Town, Boston United, Sheffield Wednesday, Preston North End, Northampton Town, Leyton Orient, Mansfield Town, Chesterfield, Telford United, Emley, Gainsborough Trinity, Hucknall Town and Heanor Town.

He also had spells as player-manager of both Boston United and Gainsborough Trinity.

== Personal life ==
Fee has a degree in mathematics.
