= Gary McDonald (footballer, born 1969) =

English footballer

Personal information
- Full name: Gary McDonald
- Date of birth: 20 November 1969 (age 56)
- Place of birth: Sunderland, England
- Position: Forward

Senior career*
Years	Team	Apps	(Gls)
1988–1989	Ipswich Town	0	(0)
1989–1990	Mansfield Town	2	(0)
1990–1993	Blyth Spartans		
1993	Gateshead		
Total		2	(0)
- * Club domestic league appearances and goals

Gary McDonald (born 20 November 1969) is an English former professional footballer who played in the Football League for Mansfield Town.
