= Ian Hathaway =

English footballer

Personal information
- Full name: Ian Ashley Hathaway
- Date of birth: 22 August 1968 (age 58)
- Place of birth: Wordsley, England
- Position: Winger

Youth career
- Wolverhampton Wanderers
- West Bromwich Albion

Senior career*
| Years | Team | Apps | (Gls) |
- Stourbridge
| 19??–1989 | Bedworth United | | |
| 1989–1991 | Mansfield Town | 44 | (2) |
| 1991–1993 | Rotherham United | 13 | (1) |
| 1993–1997 | Torquay United | 140 | (14) |
| 1996 | → Chesterfield (loan) | 0 | (0) |
| 1997–1998 | Colchester United | 12 | (0) |
| 1998–2001 | Aldershot Town | 81 | (6) |
| 2001 | Andover | 1 | (0) |
- * Club domestic league appearances and goals

Ian Ashley Hathaway (born 22 August 1968) is an English former professional football midfielder.

Hathaway began his career as an apprentice with West Bromwich Albion after youth training with Wolverhampton Wanderers. He began his apprenticeship late due to a broken arm, but in 1986 was released by new manager Ron Saunders without making the grade at the Hawthorns. He joined Wolves on a weekly contract, playing alongside Dean Edwards and Micky Holmes but was released when Graham Turner took over as manager from Brian Little.

He began working in an engineering factory, joining non-league Stourbridge before moving to Bedworth United. Whilst at Bedworth he attracted the attention of a number of league sides before Ian Greaves offered him a contract with Mansfield Town in March 1989. Despite the fact that Greaves was sacked within days the new manager George Foster also wanted to sign him and he duly moved to Mansfield for a fee of £8,000, making his league debut as a substitute on 11 March in a 3–0 home defeat at the hands of Preston North End. He chose an apt time to score his first league for Mansfield when at the end of the season he scored against local rivals Chesterfield, the goal preserving Mansfield's Third Division status and relegating Chesterfield.

He played 44 games for the Stags (23 as a substitute), scoring twice, before joining Rotherham United in March 1991 with Steve Spooner moving in the opposite direction. Towards the end of the following season he contracted pneumonia and after failing to regain his place after his eventual recovery was released, joining Torquay United in July 1993 and quickly establishing himself as a regular member of Don O'Riordan's side. In March 1996 he joined Chesterfield on loan, but returned to Torquay without appearing in the Chesterfield first team. He spent four years at Plainmoor, scoring 14 times in 140 league games, before joining Colchester United on a free transfer on 5 June 1997 after being released by Kevin Hodges. He played only 12 times for Colchester before moving to Aldershot Town in September 1998, playing a major role as the 'Shots attempted to climb back towards their former league status. He left Aldershot in May 2001 when his contract expired.

He worked as a postman and in October 2001 joined Andover. He played just once for Andover and in December 2001 was named as manager of Hampshire Division Two side Broughton.

He returned to Aldershot in July 2004 for Jason Chewins' testimonial.
