= Mark Smalley =

English footballer

Personal information
- Full name: Mark Anthony Smalley
- Date of birth: 2 January 1965 (age 61)
- Place of birth: Newark-on-Trent, England
- Height: 5 ft 11 in (1.80 m)
- Position: Central defender

Youth career
- 1981–1983: Nottingham Forest

Senior career*
Years	Team	Apps	(Gls)
1983–1987	Nottingham Forest	3	(0)
1986	→ Birmingham City (loan)	7	(0)
1986–1987	→ Bristol Rovers (loan)	10	(0)
1987–1990	Leyton Orient	64	(4)
1989–1990	→ Mansfield Town (loan) (Note: The figures against Smalley's permanent Mansfield Town career cover his appearances and goals both while on loan at the club (from November 1989 to January 1990) and once signed permanently in January 1990.)		
1990–1991	Mansfield Town	49	(2)
1991–1992	Maidstone United	34	(2)
1992–1993	Kettering Town	19	(0)
1993–199?	Ilkeston Town		
1995	Hucknall Town		

International career
1983	England U17	3	(0)
1983	England U18	1	(0)
- * Club domestic league appearances and goals

Mark Anthony Smalley (born 2 January 1965) is an English former professional footballer who made 167 appearances in the Football League playing for Nottingham Forest, Birmingham City, Bristol Rovers, Leyton Orient, Mansfield Town and Maidstone United. He played as a central defender. Smalley represented England at youth level.

== Career ==
Smalley was born in Newark-on-Trent, Nottinghamshire. When he left school in 1981, he joined Nottingham Forest as an apprentice, and turned professional two years later. He made his debut in the First Division on 19 March 1983, coming on as substitute for Kenny Swain in a 2–0 defeat away at Ipswich Town. Smalley played five times altogether for Forest's first team: one substitute appearance in the league in the 1983–84 season, and three games in September 1984 deputising for Paul Hart, one in the UEFA Cup, one in the League, and the third in the League Cup in which he sustained a hip injury. He spent the last few weeks of the 1985–86 season on loan at First Division Birmingham City, where his contribution was insufficient to prevent the team losing their last seven games, and spent the first part of the next season at Third Division club Bristol Rovers.

In February 1987 Smalley signed for Orient of the Fourth Division. After two-and-a-half seasons in which he played 64 league games, he joined Mansfield Town, initially on loan, making the deal permanent in January 1990 for a fee of £15,000. He played 49 league games before moving on to Maidstone United, for whom he played 34 games before the club was wound up at the end of the 1991–92 season. Smalley then moved into non-league football with Conference club Kettering Town, for whom he played 24 games in all competitions, Ilkeston Town and Hucknall Town.
