= Malcolm Murray (footballer) =

Scottish footballer

Personal information
- Full name: Malcolm Murray
- Date of birth: 26 July 1964 (age 62)
- Place of birth: Buckie, Scotland
- Position: Full back

Senior career*
Years	Team	Apps	(Gls)
1982–1983	Buckie Thistle		
1983–1988	Heart of Midlothian	39	(0)
1987	→ Stirling Albion (loan)	5	(0)
1988	→ St Johnstone (loan)	2	(0)
1988–1990	Hull City	11	(0)
1990–1992	Mansfield Town	59	(0)
1991	Meadowbank Thistle	1	(0)
1991	Partick Thistle	23	(0)
1992	Clydebank	6	(0)
1992	Meadowbank Thistle	71	(4)
1992–1994	Arbroath	24	(3)
1995	Buckie Thistle		
Total		229	(7)
- * Club domestic league appearances and goals

Malcolm Murray (born 26 July 1964) is a Scottish former professional footballer who played in the Football League for Hull City and Mansfield Town.
