= Wayne Fairclough =

English footballer

Personal information
- Full name: Wayne Ricks Fairclough
- Date of birth: 27 April 1968 (age 58)
- Place of birth: Nottingham, England
- Height: 5 ft 10 in (1.78 m)
- Position: Central defender

Senior career*
Years	Team	Apps	(Gls)
1985–1990	Notts County	71	(0)
1990–1994	Mansfield Town	141	(12)
1994–1996	Chesterfield	15	(0)
1996	→ Scarborough (loan)	7	(0)
1996–1998	Northwich Victoria		
1998	Grantham Town		
1998–1999	Northwich Victoria		
1999–2000	Ilkeston Town		
2000–2002	Hucknall Town		
2002	Matlock Town		
Total		234	(12)
- * Club domestic league appearances and goals

Wayne Ricks Fairclough (born 27 April 1968) is an English former professional footballer who played in the Football League for Chesterfield, Mansfield Town, Notts County and Scarborough.
