= Steve Wilkinson (footballer) =

English footballer

Personal information
- Full name: Stephen John Wilkinson
- Date of birth: 1 September 1968 (age 58)
- Place of birth: Lincoln, England
- Height: 6 ft 0 in (1.83 m)
- Position: Striker

Senior career*
Years	Team	Apps	(Gls)
1986–1989	Leicester City	9	(1)
1988	→ Crewe Alexandra (loan)	5	(2)
1989–1995	Mansfield Town	232	(83)
1995–1997	Preston North End	52	(13)
1997–2000	Chesterfield	75	(13)
- * Club domestic league appearances and goals

Steve Wilkinson (born 1 September 1968) is an English former professional footballer who played as a striker for five different clubs in The Football League. He is now head of the football development centre at Loughborough College.

Wilkinson began his career at Leicester City, where he climbed through the ranks and signed a professional contract in September 1986. He only played a handful of games for Leicester, and had a loan spell at Crewe Alexandra before he was sold to Mansfield Town in September 1989 for a £80,000 transfer fee – a club record at the time. He scored on his Mansfield debut on 3 October 1989 in a League Cup match against Luton Town, and finished the season as Mansfield's top scorer with 15 league goals.

His arguably finest moment in a Mansfield shirt came on 3 April 1990, when Wilkinson scored all five goals in Mansfield's 5–2 victory against Birmingham City. The following season, Wilkinson's goals could not prevent Mansfield from being relegated from Division Three. However, largely thanks to the 40 league goals scored by Wilkinson and his strike partner Phil Stant, Mansfield bounced straight back up in 1991–92, only to be relegated the next season again.

In 1994–95, Wilkinson had his most productive season, scoring 26 league goals, including a hat-trick against arch-rivals Chesterfield, as Mansfield reached the playoffs. However, the Stags missed out on promotion, losing 6–3 on aggregate against Chesterfield in the playoff semifinal. Later that summer, Wilkinson was sold to Preston North End for £100,000. Overall, in all competitions, Wilkinson scored 91 goals for Mansfield, which places him third on the club's all-time scoring list behind Harry Johnson and Ken Wagstaff.

Wilkinson spent two seasons at Preston, where he scored 18 goals and added a Division Three championship medal to his collection, before moving back to the East Midlands in July 1997, when he joined Chesterfield. He spent three seasons at Chesterfield, scoring 15 goals, before retiring from the game in 2000. He now lives in Loughborough and teaches in the sports department of Loughborough College.

== Honours ==
Preston North End

- Football League Third Division: 1995–96
