= Martin Clark (footballer, born 1968) =

Scottish footballer and coach

Personal information
- Full name: Martin John Clark
- Date of birth: 13 October 1968 (age 58)
- Place of birth: Motherwell, Scotland
- Position: Midfielder

Senior career*
| Years | Team | Apps | (Gls) |
| 1986–1987 | Hamilton Academical | 0 | (0) |
| 1987–1989 | Clyde | 51 | (2) |
| 1989–1990 | Nottingham Forest | 0 | (0) |
| 1989 | → Falkirk (loan) | 3 | (1) |
| 1990 | → Mansfield Town (loan) | 14 | (1) |
| 1990–1992 | Mansfield Town | 33 | (0) |
| 1992–1993 | Partick Thistle | 19 | (0) |
| 1993–1995 | Clyde | 30 | (0) |
| 1995–1996 | Macclesfield Town | 8 | (0) |
| 1996–1997 | Albion Rovers | 28 | (2) |
| 1997 | Armadale Thistle | | |
| Total | | 186 | (6) |
- * Club domestic league appearances and goals

Martin John Clark (born 13 October 1968 in Motherwell), is a Scottish football player and coach.

Clark began his career with Hamilton Academical but did not make a senior appearance for them. He was signed for Clyde, by his father John, and spent two years with the club before transferring to Nottingham Forest. His move to Nottingham was unsuccessful, and after two loan spells, he joined Mansfield Town. He returned to Scotland in 1992, joining Clyde's arch-rivals Partick Thistle. He stayed there for a season, before rejoining Clyde. He went on to have spells with Macclesfield Town and Albion Rovers, before retiring in 1997 after a short spell in the juniors with Armadale Thistle.

Clark has also worked as a coach for Jim McInally at Greenock Morton, youth teams at Celtic and East Stirlingshire.
