= Graham Leishman =

English footballer

Personal information
- Full name: Graham Leishman
- Date of birth: 6 April 1968 (age 58)
- Place of birth: Salford, England
- Position: Forward

Senior career*
Years	Team	Apps	(Gls)
1987–1988	Irlam Town		
1988–1991	Mansfield Town	27	(3)
1991	Gateshead		
1991–1997	Gainsborough Trinity		
1997	Atherton Laburnum Rovers		
Total		27	(3)
- * Club domestic league appearances and goals

Graham Leishman (born 6 April 1968) is an English former professional footballer who played in the Football League for Mansfield Town.
