= Steve Williams (footballer, born 1970) =

English footballer

Personal information
- Full name: Steven Brian Williams
- Date of birth: 8 July 1970 (age 56)
- Place of birth: Mansfield, England
- Position: Forward

Senior career*
Years	Team	Apps	(Gls)
1986–1989	Mansfield Town	11	(0)
1988–1989	Eastwood Town		
1989–1993	Chesterfield	98	(12)
1993	Eastwood Town		
1994	Ilkeston Town		
Total		109	(12)
- * Club domestic league appearances and goals

Steven Brian Williams (born 8 July 1970) is an English former professional footballer who played in the Football League for Chesterfield and Mansfield Town.
