= George Foster (footballer) =

English footballer & manager (born 1956)

Personal information
- Full name: George Walter Foster
- Date of birth: 26 September 1956 (age 70)
- Place of birth: Plymouth, Devon, England
- Height: 5 ft 10 in (1.78 m)
- Position: Central defender

Youth career
- Plymouth Argyle

Senior career*
Years	Team	Apps	(Gls)
1974–1982	Plymouth Argyle	212	(6)
1976	→ Torquay United (loan)	6	(3)
1981–1982	→ Exeter City (loan)	28	(0)
1982–1983	Derby County	30	(0)
1983–1993	Mansfield Town	373	(0)
1993	Telford United	2	(0)
Total		651	(9)

Managerial career
- 1989–1993: Mansfield Town (player-manager)
- 1993–1995: Telford United
- * Club domestic league appearances and goals

George Walter Foster (born 26 September 1956) is an English former football player and manager.

Foster began his career as a full-back but was later moved into central defence. He began his career at Plymouth Argyle in 1974. He went on to spend eight years with the "Pilgrims", winning promotion out of the Third Division in 1974–75, as well as the club's Player of the Year award in 1978 and 1980. He also played on loan at Torquay United and Exeter City.

He was sold to Derby County for a £40,000 fee in June 1982 before moving on to Mansfield Town the following year. He spent the next decade with the "Stags" and, after being named as the club's Player of the Year, was then named on the PFA Team of the Year as he helped Mansfield to win promotion out of the Fourth Division in 1985–86. He also won the Football League Trophy with the club in 1987.

He was appointed player-manager in February 1989 and led the club to promotion out of the Fourth Division in 1991–92, but was sacked after failing to keep Mansfield in the Third Division. He ended his playing career with 649 league appearances in a 20-year career in the Football League. He later managed Conference club Telford United from 1993 to 1995, before becoming a professional scout.

== Playing career ==
=== Plymouth Argyle ===
Foster began his career at his hometown club Plymouth Argyle, moving from the youth team through the reserve team and into the first-team. He made his debut in a Third Division match against Hereford United on 20 February 1974. The club finished in 17th place in 1973–74, before winning promotion as the division's runners-up in 1974–75 – they finished just one point behind champions Blackburn Rovers.

Argyle went on to finish 16th in the Second Division in 1975–76 before slipping back into the third tier after finishing two points short of safety in 1976–77. Foster also spent a brief time on loan at Devon rivals Torquay United in October 1976, scoring three goals in six league games. The "Pilgrims" replaced manager Tony Waiters with Mike Kelly, and only avoided a second-successive relegation by just two places and three points in 1977–78 after Malcolm Allison replaced Kelly as manager in March. Foster was changed to the centre-back position during the campaign, and it was there that he established himself as a mainstay in the starting eleven.

Under the stewardship of new boss Bobby Saxton, Plymouth moved up to a more secure 15th-place finish in 1978–79, and Foster recovered from a broken leg to regain his first-team spot for the 1979–80 campaign. Plymouth rose to seventh place in 1980–81, before new manager Bobby Moncur led the club to a tenth-place finish in 1981–82. Foster spent part of the season on loan at Brian Godfrey's Exeter City, playing 28 Third Division games at St James Park after making his debut against Plymouth on 28 December.

He was an ever-present at Exeter for the remainder of the campaign and became the first player to win the club's Player of the Year award whilst on loan from another club. He turned down a transfer to Sheffield United as he did not want to drop down to the Fourth Division. During eight years at Home Park, Foster scored six goals in 248 league and cup appearances and was named as the club's Player of the Year in 1978 and 1980.

=== Derby County ===
In June 1982, Derby County manager Peter Taylor paid £40,000 for his services. Foster would only spend one season at the Baseball Ground, playing 30 Second Division games for the "Rams".

=== Mansfield Town ===
Foster joined Mansfield Town on a free transfer in the summer of 1983. He made his Mansfield debut on 27 August 1983 in a 4–0 defeat against Bristol City. However, things would soon take a turn for the better, and Foster was named the club's Player of the Year as Ian Greaves's "Stags" finished 19th in the Fourth Division in 1983–84. He was then named team captain and marshalled a defence that only conceded 38 goals in the league in 1984–85. In 1985–86, Foster helped the Field Mill club gain promotion to third place and was recognised by his peers with a place on the PFA Team of the Year.

Mansfield then finished tenth in the Third Division in 1986–87, and Foster captained the side in their triumph at Wembley as Mansfield won the Football League Trophy after a penalty shoot-out victory over Bristol City. Town then finished just two places and two points above the relegation zone in 1987–88.

== Managerial career ==
=== Mansfield Town ===
When Ian Greaves stepped down as Mansfield manager in February 1989, Foster was named player-manager. The "Stags" ended the 1988–89 season in 15th place in the Third Division. In his first full season in charge, 1989–90, Mansfield again posted a 15th-place finish. After finishing bottom of the division in the 1990–91 campaign, they suffered relegation. Foster then took the Field Mill club straight back up after leading the club to the third and final automatic Fourth Division promotion place in 1991–92. However, he could not keep the club in the Third Division, as they went back down in 1992–93. In September 1993, following a poor start to the 1993–94 season, Foster was sacked as manager. Mansfield went on to finish in 12th place under new manager Andy King.

=== Telford United ===
In October 1993, Foster was named player-manager at Telford United, where he stayed until June 1995. He led the "Bucks" to 17th and 19th-place finishes in the Conference in 1993–94 and 1994–95, as Telford finished just above the relegation zone.

== Scouting career ==
After a spell as assistant manager at Lincoln City, Foster was appointed chief scout at Wolverhampton Wanderers by manager Dave Jones in April 2001. He worked as chief scout at Coventry City until he was sacked after manager Micky Adams was replaced by Iain Dowie in February 2008. He was appointed as Academy director by Stoke City boss Tony Pulis in April 2007. He later scouted for the Glenn Hoddle Academy, before being appointed chief scout at Hull City by manager Nick Barmby in December 2011. He was appointed chief scout at Port Vale by Micky Adams in November 2012. His greatest success was to spot Jordan Hugill playing in non-League football; he left the position in June 2014 to take up a new role as Swansea City's European scout. He was appointed as assistant manager to James Rowe at National League North club Gloucester City at December 2019. He followed Rowe to Chesterfield in November 2020.

== Career statistics ==
Appearances and goals by club, season and competition
Club	Season	League			FA Cup		Other^{[A]}		Total	
Club	Season	Division	Apps	Goals	Apps	Goals	Apps	Goals	Apps	Goals
Plymouth Argyle	1973–74	Third Division	5	0	0	0	0	0	5	0
Plymouth Argyle	1974–75	Second Division	0	0	0	0	0	0	0	0
Plymouth Argyle	1975–76	Second Division	16	1	0	0	1	0	17	1
Plymouth Argyle	1976–77	Second Division	15	2	0	0	0	0	15	2
Plymouth Argyle	1977–78	Third Division	46	3	4	0	5	0	55	4
Plymouth Argyle	1978–79	Third Division	28	0	1	0	4	0	33	0
Plymouth Argyle	1979–80	Third Division	46	0	2	0	9	0	57	0
Plymouth Argyle	1980–81	Third Division	46	0	3	0	2	0	51	0
Plymouth Argyle	1981–82	Third Division	10	0	0	0	1	0	11	0
Plymouth Argyle	Total		212	6	10	0	22	0	244	6
Torquay United (loan)	1976–77	Fourth Division	6	3	0	0	0	0	6	3
Exeter City (loan)	1981–82	Third Division	28	0	0	0	0	0	28	0
Derby County	1982–83	Second Division	30	0	3	0	5	0	38	0
Mansfield Town	1983–84	Fourth Division	42	0	2	0	3	0	47	0
Mansfield Town	1984–85	Fourth Division	44	0	2	0	8	1	54	1
Mansfield Town	1985–86	Fourth Division	46	0	2	0	9	0	57	0
Mansfield Town	1986–87	Third Division	45	0	1	1	9	0	55	1
Mansfield Town	1987–88	Third Division	44	0	5	1	8	0	57	1
Mansfield Town	1988–89	Third Division	42	0	2	0	4	0	48	0
Mansfield Town	1989–90	Third Division	42	0	1	0	7	0	50	0
Mansfield Town	1990–91	Third Division	34	0	3	0	5	0	42	0
Mansfield Town	1991–92	Fourth Division	24	0	1	0	4	0	29	0
Mansfield Town	1992–93	Second Division	10	0	0	0	0	0	10	0
Mansfield Town	Total		373	0	19	2	57	1	449	3
Career total			649	9	32	2	84	1	765	12

A. The "Other" column constitutes appearances and goals in the League Cup, Football League Trophy, English Football League play-offs and Full Members Cup.

== Honours ==
Mansfield Town

- Football League Fourth Division third-place promotion: 1985–86, 1991–92
- Associate Members' Cup: 1986–87

Individual

- Plymouth Argyle Player of the Year: 1977–78, 1979–80
- Exeter City Player of the Year: 1981–82
- Mansfield Town Player of the Year: 1983–84
- PFA Team of the Year: 1985–86 Fourth Division
