= Neil Whatmore =

English footballer

Personal information
- Date of birth: 17 May 1955 (age 71)
- Place of birth: Ellesmere Port, England
- Height: 5 ft 9 in (1.75 m)
- Position: Striker

Youth career
- 1971–1973: Bolton Wanderers

Senior career*
Years	Team	Apps	(Gls)
1973–1981	Bolton Wanderers	277	(102)
1981–1983	Birmingham City	26	(6)
1982	→ Oxford United (loan)	0	(0)
1982–1983	→ Bolton Wanderers (loan)	10	(3)
1983–1984	Oxford United	36	(15)
1984	→ Bolton Wanderers (loan)	7	(2)
1984	Burnley	8	(1)
1984–1987	Mansfield Town	72	(20)
1987	Bolton Wanderers	0	(0)
1987–1988	Mansfield Town	4	(0)
1988–19??	Worksop Town		
1989	Eastwood Town		
Total		440	(149)
- * Club domestic league appearances and goals

Neil Whatmore (born 17 May 1955) is an English former footballer who played as a striker. He made 449 appearances in the Football League and scored 150 goals, playing for Bolton Wanderers, Birmingham City, Oxford United, Burnley and Mansfield Town. He is perhaps best known for his four separate spells at Bolton Wanderers in the 1980s.

== Career ==
Whatmore was born in Ellesmere Port, Cheshire. He was educated at Ellesmere Port Grammar School, where he was spotted by a Bolton Wanderers scout and, together with Paul Jones, Barry Siddall and Paul Holding, signed for that club. He made his debut for Bolton in what was then the Football League Third Division as an amateur, after coming through the club's youth system. He scored twice in this game, away at Swansea City. Bolton secured the divisional title that year and he scored 31 goals four years later in promotion to the First Division. On promotion to the top division, Bolton's first choice forward line became Alan Gowling and Frank Worthington and Whatmore played in midfield for a season before being pushed forward again, scoring 18 goals although Bolton were relegated.

Birmingham City signed him for £350,000 to reunite him with Worthington, but the pair failed to gel, and Whatmore played only rarely. When Ron Saunders took over as manager, both players fell from favour, but Whatmore stayed another year, some of which he spent on loan at Oxford United and for three months at Bolton, before being sold to Oxford United. The emergence of John Aldridge meant Whatmore was surplus to requirements after a season and, after a second loan spell at Bolton, he joined Burnley in a part-exchange deal with Billy Hamilton before moving on to Mansfield Town a few months later. At Mansfield he helped them win the 1986–87 Associate Members' Cup, playing in the final. When he was released after two-and-a-half years he spent his fourth and final spell at Burnden Park, an anonymous fan coming up with his wages, but he did not make the team and re-signed for Mansfield Town on a non-contract basis as reserve team coach and occasional player. In 1988, he moved into non-league football with Worksop Town, and later coached in South Africa.

== Honours ==
Oxford United

- Football League Third Division: 1983–84

Mansfield Town

- Associate Members' Cup: 1986–87
