= Mike Graham (footballer) =

English footballer

Personal information
- Date of birth: 24 February 1959 (age 67)
- Place of birth: Lancaster, England
- Height: 5 ft 9 in (1.75 m)
- Position: Right back

Senior career*
Years	Team	Apps	(Gls)
1977–1981	Bolton Wanderers	46	(0)
1981–1985	Swindon Town	141	(1)
1985–1988	Mansfield Town	133	(1)
1988–1992	Carlisle United	138	(3)
Total		458	(5)
- * Club domestic league appearances and goals

Mike Graham (born 24 February 1959) is an English former footballer who played in the Football League for Bolton Wanderers, Carlisle United, Mansfield Town and Swindon Town. At Mansfield he helped them win the 1986–87 Associate Members' Cup, playing in the final.

== Honours ==
Mansfield Town

- Associate Members' Cup: 1986–87
