= Nicky Andersen =

English footballer

Personal information
- Full name: Nicholas John Andersen
- Date of birth: 29 March 1969 (age 57)
- Place of birth: Lincoln, England
- Position: Full back

Senior career*
Years	Team	Apps	(Gls)
1985–1989	Mansfield Town	20	(0)
1989	Lincoln City	1	(0)
1989–1991	Nuneaton Borough		
1991–1992	Grantham Town		
1992–1993	Tamworth		
1993–1994	Bedworth United		
1994–1995	Leek Town		
1995	Nuneaton Borough		
1995	Corby Town		
1996	Grantham Town		
1997	Nuneaton Borough		
Total		21	(0)
- * Club domestic league appearances and goals

Nicholas John Andersen (born 29 March 1969) is an English former professional footballer who played in the Football League for Lincoln City and Mansfield Town.
