= Keith Cassells =

English footballer (born 1957)

Personal information
- Full name: Keith Barrington Cassells
- Date of birth: 10 July 1957 (age 69)
- Place of birth: Islington, England
- Height: 5 ft 10 in (1.78 m)
- Positions: Forward; right winger

Youth career
- –1977: Wembley

Senior career*
Years	Team	Apps	(Gls)
1977–1980	Watford	12	(0)
1980	→ Peterborough United (loan)	8	(0)
1980–1982	Oxford United	45	(13)
1982–1983	Southampton	19	(4)
1983–1985	Brentford	86	(28)
1985–1989	Mansfield Town	163	(52)
Total		333	(97)
- * Club domestic league appearances and goals

Keith Barrington Cassells (born 10 July 1957) is an English retired professional footballer, best remembered for his four seasons as a forward in the Football League with Mansfield Town. He also played league football for Watford, Oxford United, Brentford and briefly in the First Division for Southampton. He acquired the nickname "Rosie" during his playing career.

== Career ==
=== Early years ===
A forward, Cassells began his career at Isthmian League club Wembley, before joining Fourth Division club Watford for a £500 fee in October 1977. A double promotion from the Fourth to the Second Division hampered Cassells' chances at Vicarage Road and he made just 17 appearances before his departure in November 1980.

=== Oxford United and Southampton ===
In November 1980, Cassells dropped back down to the Third Division to join Oxford United as the makeweight in the deal which saw Les Taylor join Watford for a £100,000 fee. He scored 25 goals in 60 matches, before making a surprise move to First Division club Southampton for an £80,000 fee in March 1982. At the end of the 1981–82 season, he was named in the Third Division PFA Team of the Year. Cassells failed to make a breakthrough at The Dell and made just 27 appearances and scored five goals before leaving the club in February 1983.

=== Brentford ===
Cassells dropped back down to the Third Division to join Brentford for a £25,000 fee in February 1983. Signed as a replacement for the injured Tony Mahoney, over the following 2 1/2 seasons he proved himself to be "a powerful-running frontman" and "a consistent, if unspectacular goalscorer". A switch to the right wing during the 1984–85 season saw Cassells finish the season as the team's leading league goalscorer (12) and the team's joint-leading goalscorer (18, with Gary Roberts). He also helped the team to the 1985 Football League Trophy Final and the match proved to be his final Brentford appearance. After rejecting a new contract, Cassells departed Griffin Park in August 1985 and finished his Bees career with 102 appearances and 28 goals.

=== Mansfield Town ===
Cassells joined Fourth Division club Mansfield Town for a £17,000 fee in August 1985. He had an excellent 1985–86 season, scoring a hat-trick on his debut and helping the club secure promotion to the Third Division with a third-place finish. He experienced more success in the following season, winning the 1987 Football League Trophy Final, despite missing a penalty in the deciding shootout. His career was ended by injury in 1989, by which time he had made 163 league appearances and scored 52 goals for the Stags.

== Personal life ==
Before becoming a professional footballer, Cassells worked as a postman. After his retirement from football in 1989, he joined the Hertfordshire Constabulary and rose to the rank of detective sergeant. He was awarded the Police Long Service and Good Conduct Medal in 2011.

== Career statistics ==
Appearances and goals by club, season and competition
Club	Season	League			FA Cup		League Cup		Europe		Other		Total	
Club	Season	Division	Apps	Goals	Apps	Goals	Apps	Goals	Apps	Goals	Apps	Goals	Apps	Goals
Watford	1978–79	Third Division	3	0	2	0	2	0	—		—		7	0
Watford	1979–80	Second Division	7	0	0	0	0	0	—		—		7	0
Watford	1980–81	Second Division	2	0	—		1	0	—		—		3	0
Watford	Total		12	0	2	0	3	0	—		—		17	0
Peterborough United (loan)	1979–80	Fourth Division	8	0	—		—		—		—		8	0
Oxford United	1980–81	Third Division	18	3	2	0	—		—		—		20	3
Oxford United	1981–82	Third Division	27	10	6	7	4	4	—		3 (Note: Appearances in Football League Group Cup)	1	40	22
Oxford United	Total		45	13	8	7	4	4	—		3	1	60	25
Southampton	1981–82	First Division	6	2	—		—		0	0	—		6	2
Southampton	1982–83	First Division	13	2	1	0	5	1	2 (Note: Appearances in UEFA Cup)	0	—		21	3
Southampton	Total		19	4	1	0	5	1	2	0	—		27	5
Brentford	1982–83	Third Division	16	7	—		—		—		—		16	7
Brentford	1983–84	Third Division	30	9	1	1	2	0	—		2 (Note: Appearances in Football League Trophy)	0	35	10
Brentford	1984–85	Third Division	40	12	4	4	2	0	—		5	2	51	18
Brentford	Total		86	28	5	5	4	0	—		7	2	102	28
Mansfield Town	1985–86	Fourth Division	40	13	0	0	0	0	—		0	0	40	13
Mansfield Town	1986–87	Third Division	46	16	0	0	0	0	—		0	0	46	16
Mansfield Town	1987–88	Third Division	40	9	0	0	0	0	—		0	0	40	9
Mansfield Town	1988–89	Third Division	37	14	0	0	0	0	—		0	0	37	14
Mansfield Town	Total		163	52	0	0	0	0	—		0	0	163	52
Career total			333	97	17	12	16	5	2	0	10	3	378	117

== Honours ==
Brentford

- Associate Members' Cup runner-up: 1984–85

Mansfield Town

- Football League Fourth Division third-place promotion: 1985–86
- Associate Members' Cup: 1986–87

Individual

- PFA Team of the Year: 1981–82 Third Division
