= Jason Pearcey =

English footballer and coach (born 1971)

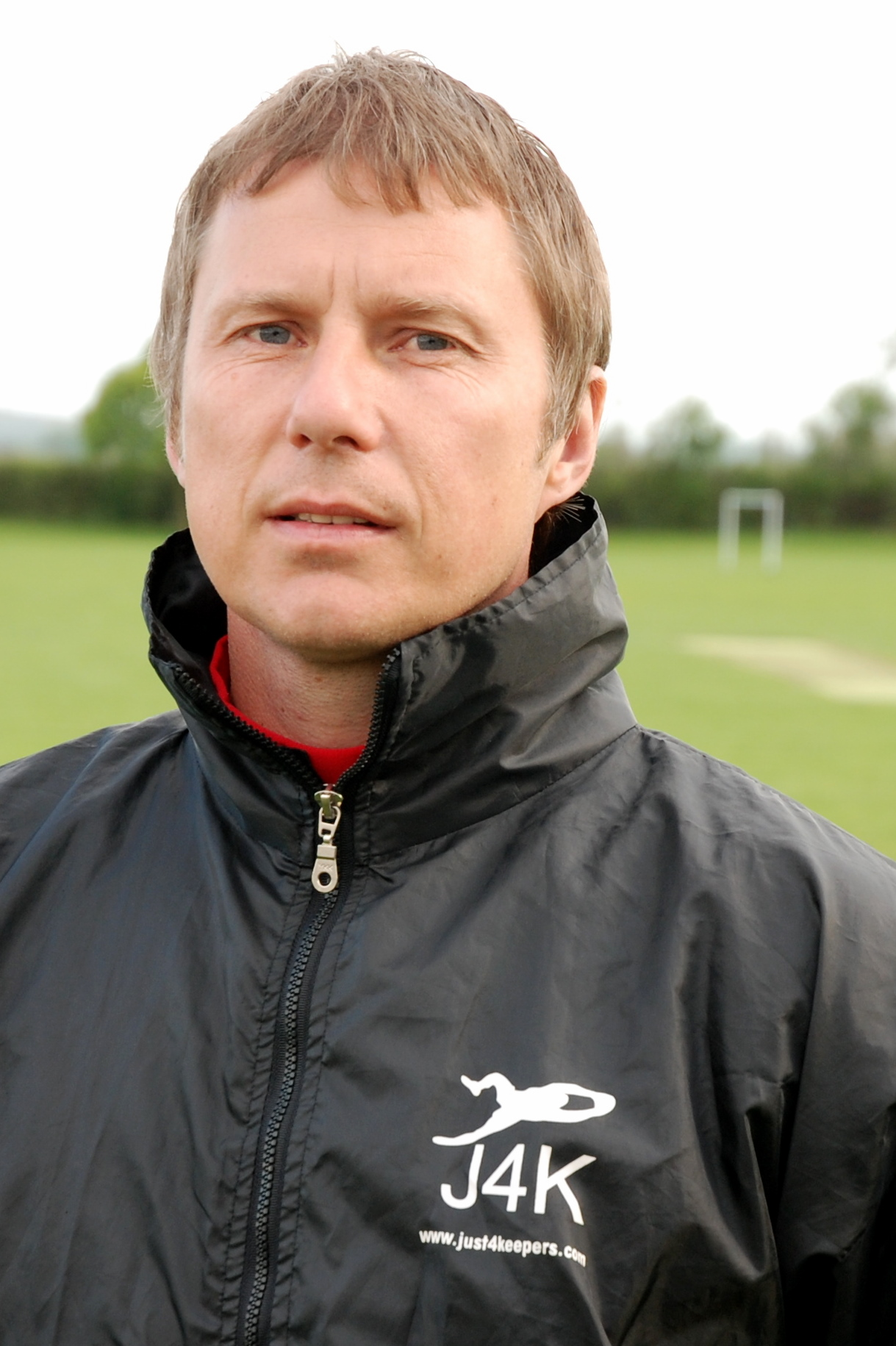
- Pearcey in 2010

Personal information
- Full name: Jason Pearcey
- Date of birth: 23 July 1971 (age 55)
- Place of birth: Leamington Spa, England
- Position: Goalkeeper

Senior career*
Years	Team	Apps	(Gls)
1989–1994	Mansfield Town	77	(0)
1994–1998	Grimsby Town	79	(0)
1998–2000	Brentford	23	(0)
2002	Forest Green Rovers	3	(0)
2002–2004	Southam United		
2004–2005	Leamington		
2005–2006	Rugby Town		
Total		182+	(0)
- * Club domestic league appearances and goals as of 09:08, 17 December 2007 (UTC)

Jason Kevin Pearcey (born 23 July 1971) is an English former professional footballer and former first team goalkeeping coach at Derby County.

As a player he was a goalkeeper from 1989 until 2006. He played in the Football League for Mansfield Town, Grimsby Town and Brentford before ending his career in the Conference National with Forest Green Rovers. He came out of retirement the following year and continued to play at non-league level for Southam United, Leamington and Rugby Town.

== Playing career ==
Pearcey started his professional career at Mansfield Town at the age of 18 (although being with the club since age 15). He left to join Grimsby Town with a £10,000 transfer fee and stayed for three and a half years before a Bosman ruling transfer to Brentford where Jason played for two and a half years.

During the 2000–01 season, Pearcey sustained a leg injury which ended his professional career, although he made three appearances for Conference National Forest Green Rovers. He has since then kept playing at non-league level making appearances at Southam United, his home town team Leamington and his last club the Southern League Premier side Rugby Town.

== Coaching career ==
Pearcey is now specialises in goalkeeper coaching in Worcestershire and the West Midlands. He is qualified to Level 3 Outfield and Level 3 Goalkeeping status. Pearcey in 2009, started working in Derby County's academy as a goalkeeping coach, he stayed in this role until November 2020 when he was promoted first team Goalkeeping coach at replacing Shay Given, with Wayne Rooney becoming Derby's manager. Pearcey would retain his role when Liam Rosenior took over as interim manager in June 2022, but would leave Derby on 27 September 2022, after Rosenior departed the club. Pearcey does coaching for soccer academy Just4Keepers.

== Honours ==
Mansfield Town

- Football League Fourth Division third-place promotion: 1991–92

Grimsby Town

- Football League Second Division play-offs: 1998
- Football League Trophy: 1997–98

Brentford

- Football League Third Division: 1998–99
