= Trevor Christie =

English footballer

Trevor Christie (born 28 February 1959) is an English footballer who played as a striker.

Christie was born in Newcastle upon Tyne, England, and began his career with Leicester City before joining Notts County in 1979. He enjoyed arguably his most successful years with County, winning promotion to the First Division in 1981. He was County's top scorer in the 1983–84 season, a season in which they were relegated.

He went on to play for Nottingham Forest, Derby County, Manchester City, Walsall, Mansfield Town, Kettering Town, Hucknall Town and Arnold Town.

== Honours ==
Walsall

- Football League Third Division play-offs: 1988
