= Steve Charles (footballer) =

English footballer

Personal information
- Full name: Stephen Charles
- Date of birth: 10 May 1960 (age 66)
- Place of birth: Sheffield, England
- Height: 5 ft 9 in (1.75 m)
- Position: Midfielder

College career
Years	Team	Apps	(Gls)
1978–1979	Columbia Lions		

Senior career*
Years	Team	Apps	(Gls)
1980–1984	Sheffield United	123	(10)
1984–1987	Wrexham	113	(37)
1987–1993	Mansfield Town	237	(38)
1992	→ Scunthorpe United (loan)	4	(0)
1993–1996	Scarborough	134	(20)
1996–1997	Stalybridge Celtic	42	(11)
1997–2000	Boston United	87	(21)

Managerial career
- 2007–2009: Gainsborough Trinity
- * Club domestic league appearances and goals

Stephen Charles (born 10 May 1960) is a former professional footballer who played in the English Football League as a midfielder for five different clubs, and was until recently manager of Conference North side Gainsborough Trinity. He is also a graduate of Sheffield University, where he gained a degree in mathematics, and a Master's degree in sports science.

== Playing career ==
Charles attended Columbia University in the United States where he was the 1979 Ivy League MVP and a 1979 First Team All American.

an English former schoolboy international, Sheffield-born Steve Charles began his football career at Sheffield United while still a university student. He signed a professional contract with the Blades in January 1980, and went on to make over a hundred appearances for the Blades, helping the team gain promotion from Division Four in 1982. In November 1984, he moved to Wrexham where he spent two and a half years and lifted the Welsh Cup in 1986.

In the summer of 1987, Charles moved to Mansfield Town for a £15,000 transfer fee, making his debut on 15 August 1987 against Bristol City. In his first season at Field Mill, he was ever-present in the side and scored 12 goals, many of them from free kicks. He spent six seasons at Mansfield, playing 278 games for the club in all competitions, scoring 47 goals. He is a member of the Mansfield Town Hall of Fame. He left to join Scarborough in February 1993, and also had a short loan spell at Scunthorpe United near the end of his time in Mansfield.

Charles played nearly 150 games for Scarborough during a three-year spell, and then continued his career in the non-league game, where he played for Stalybridge Celtic and Boston United until he was 40 years old.

== Coaching career ==
From 2007 until August 2009 he was manager of Gainsborough Trinity.

== Honours ==
Sheffield United

- Football League Fourth Division: 1981–82
