= Mark Kearney (footballer) =

English footballer

Personal information
- Full name: Mark James Kearney
- Date of birth: 12 June 1962 (age 64)
- Place of birth: Ormskirk, England
- Height: 5 ft 10 in (1.78 m)
- Positions: Winger; full-back

Senior career*
Years	Team	Apps	(Gls)
1981–1983	Everton	0	(0)
1983–1991	Mansfield Town	250	(29)
1991–1994	Bury	113	(5)
1994–1997	Telford United	109	(4)
- * Club domestic league appearances and goals

Mark James Kearney (born 12 June 1962) is an English retired footballer who played in The Football League for Mansfield Town and Bury.

Kearney was born in Ormskirk, Lancashire, and began his career at Everton. However, he never played in a competitive fixture for Everton, and joined Mansfield on a free transfer in March 1983. He made his debut for the Stags on 19 March 1983 against Colchester United. He was a versatile player who could play on the left wing, as left-back or in midfield. He also became Mansfield's penalty-taker when John Dungworth left the club in 1984.

He was a member of the Mansfield side that was promoted from Division Four in 1986, and he was also a member of the side that won the Freight Rover Trophy at Wembley in 1987. As the club's regular penalty-taker, Kearney scored the first goal in the penalty shootout, and also scored the winning goal from the penalty spot when Mansfield won against Middlesbrough in the quarter-final of the same competition.

In total, Kearney played 303 first-team games and scored 37 goals for Mansfield before leaving the club to join Bury in January 1991. He spent three years at Gigg Lane, playing just over a hundred games for the club before being released on a free transfer at the end of the 1993-94 season. He then joined non-league Telford United, who were managed by his former Mansfield teammate George Foster, as player-coach, spending three seasons at Telford before retiring from football in 1997.

Since his retirement from football, Kearney has had coaching jobs at Mansfield, Shrewsbury Town, Northampton Town and Derby County.

== Honours ==
Mansfield Town

- Associate Members' Cup: 1986–87
