= Steve Chambers =

English footballer

Personal information
- Full name: Stephen Chambers
- Date of birth: 20 July 1968 (age 58)
- Place of birth: Worksop, England
- Position: Full back

Senior career*
Years	Team	Apps	(Gls)
1985–1986	Sheffield Wednesday	0	(0)
1986–1991	Mansfield Town	57	(0)
1991	Gateshead		
1992-1998	Boston United	138	(9)
1993?	Matlock Town		
Total		57	(0)
- * Club domestic league appearances and goals

Stephen Chambers (born 20 July 1968) is an English former professional footballer who played in the Football League for Mansfield Town.
