= Simon Coleman =

English footballer

Personal information
- Date of birth: 13 June 1968 (age 58)
- Place of birth: Worksop, England
- Height: 6 ft 0 in (1.83 m)
- Position: Centre back

Senior career*
Years	Team	Apps	(Gls)
1985–1989	Mansfield Town	96	(7)
1989–1991	Middlesbrough	55	(2)
1991–1993	Derby County	70	(2)
1993–1994	Sheffield Wednesday	16	(1)
1994–1998	Bolton Wanderers	34	(5)
1997	→ Wolverhampton Wanderers (loan)	4	(0)
1998–2000	Southend United	100	(9)
2000–2002	Rochdale	16	(1)
Total		391	(27)
- * Club domestic league appearances and goals

Simon Coleman (born 13 June 1968) is an English former professional footballer who played as a defender.

He notably played in the Premier League for Sheffield Wednesday and Bolton Wanderers and in the Football League for Mansfield Town, Middlesbrough, Derby County, Wolverhampton Wanderers, Southend United and Rochdale.

== Playing career ==
He played 475 competitive games in English football and appeared in the Premier League for both Sheffield Wednesday and Bolton Wanderers. His career at Bolton may have reached greater heights in the Premier League had his leg not been broken in a tackle by Derby County's Marco Gabbiadini in February 1995.

== Personal life ==
He has previously worked at a football academy in Mansfield. He now works at Garibaldi School as a Physical Education Teacher.

== Honours ==
Middlesbrough

- Full Members' Cup runner-up: 1989–90

Bolton Wanderers

- Football League First Division: 1996–97
