= David Hodges (footballer) =

English footballer

Personal information
- Full name: David Hodges
- Date of birth: 17 January 1970 (age 56)
- Place of birth: Ross-on-Wye, England
- Position: Midfielder

Senior career*
Years	Team	Apps	(Gls)
1986–1990	Mansfield Town	85	(7)
1990–1992	Torquay United	16	(0)
1992	Kettering Town		
1992	Bolton Wanderers	0	(0)
1992	Shrewsbury Town	1	(0)
1993	Gloucester City		
1993	Bromsgrove Rovers		
Total		102	(7)
- * Club domestic league appearances and goals

David Hodges (born 17 January 1970) is an English former professional footballer who played in the Football League for Mansfield Town, Shrewsbury Town and Torquay United.
