= Craig McKernon =

English footballer

Personal information
- Full name: Craig Andrew McKernon
- Date of birth: 23 February 1968 (age 58)
- Place of birth: Gloucester, England
- Height: 5 ft 9 in (1.75 m)
- Position: Defender

Senior career*
Years	Team	Apps	(Gls)
1984–1990	Mansfield Town	94	(0)
1990–1991	Arsenal	0	(0)
1991	Kettering Town		
1992	Shepshed Albion		
1992	Hinckley Town		
1993	Oakham United		
Total		94	(0)
- * Club domestic league appearances and goals

Craig Andrew McKernon (born 23 February 1968) is an English former professional footballer who played in the Football League for Mansfield Town.
