= Ian Stringfellow =

English footballer (born 1969)

Personal information
- Full name: Ian Robert Stringfellow
- Date of birth: 8 May 1969 (age 57)
- Place of birth: Nottingham, England
- Height: 5 ft 9 in (1.75 m)
- Position: Midfielder

Senior career*
Years	Team	Apps	(Gls)
1985–1994	Mansfield Town	163	(28)
1992	→ Blackpool (loan)	3	(1)
1993–1994	→ Chesterfield (loan)	1	(0)
1994–1995	Kettering Town		
1995–1996	Dagenham & Redbridge		
1996–1998	King's Lynn		
1998–1999	Boston United		
2000	Cambridge City		
2000	Boston United		
2000–2003	Bury Town		

Managerial career
- 2000: Wisbech Town (player-manager)
- * Club domestic league appearances and goals

Ian Robert Stringfellow (born 8 May 1969) is an English former professional footballer who played as a midfielder. He is the nephew of former Mansfield Town and Leicester City winger Mike Stringfellow.

== Career ==
Stringfellow began his career with Mansfield Town in 1985. He remained with the Stags for nine years, making 163 league appearances and scoring 28 goals. He came on as a substitute for Neil Whatmore in the 1987 League Trophy Final at Wembley, and converted his penalty as Mansfield beat Bristol City in the penalty shoot-out.

In January 1992 he joined Billy Ayre's Blackpool on loan. In his three games for the Seasiders he scored one goal, in a 2–2 draw with Brighton & Hove Albion at Bloomfield Road on 19 September 1992, with Trevor Sinclair scoring the hosts' other goal.

He also went on loan to Chesterfield the following season, before being signed permanently by Kettering Town for £5,000 in 1994. After a year at Kettering he joined Dagenham & Redbridge at the start of the 1995–96 season. He signed for King's Lynn and was their top goalscorer in 1996–97.

He joined Boston United in October 1998. Although he left the club in September 1999 due to travelling and work commitments and signed for Cambridge City, he returned to Boston in March 2000. However, he was released by the club in May 2000. He then joined Wisbech Town as player-manager. However, he was sacked on 19 November 2000, after a 7–0 defeat at Rothwell Town. He subsequently signed for Bury Town in December 2000. He became the club's top scorer, but retired due to injury in 2003.

== Honours ==
Mansfield Town

- Associate Members' Cup: 1986–87
