= Andy Beasley =

English footballer (born 1964)

Personal information
- Date of birth: 15 February 1964 (age 62)
- Place of birth: Sedgley, England
- Height: 6 ft 2 in (1.88 m)
- Position: Goalkeeper

Team information
- Current team: Mansfield Town (academy goalkeeping coach)

Youth career
- 1982–1984: Luton Town

Senior career*
| Years | Team | Apps | (Gls) |
| 1984–1993 | Mansfield Town | 94 | (0) |
| 1986–1987 | → Peterborough United (loan) | 7 | (0) |
| 1988 | → Scarborough (loan) | 0 | (0) |
| 1993 | → Bristol Rovers (loan) | 1 | (0) |
| 1993–1994 | Doncaster Rovers | 37 | (0) |
| 1994–1997 | Chesterfield | 32 | (0) |
| Total | | 171 | (0) |
- * Club domestic league appearances and goals

Andrew Beasley (born 15 February 1964) is an English former professional footballer who played as a goalkeeper. He is the goalkeeping coach of Indian Super League club Bengaluru.

== Playing career ==
Beasley began his footballing career with Luton Town but left in 1984 without making a first-team appearance, and signed for Mansfield Town. He was at Field Mill for nine years, where he played a total of 109 competitive games. He helped Mansfield get promoted to the Third Division in 1986, although they were relegated back to the Fourth Division in 1991. Beasley was also part of the squad that secured promotion to the newly formed Division Two in 1992, but left following their relegation in 1993.

Early in the 1986–87, Beasley was loaned to Peterborough United where he made seven Fourth Division appearances. Later, he was loaned to Bristol Rovers for the final weeks of the 1992–93 season, but played just one game and was unable to prevent their relegation from Division One.

Beasley then signed for Doncaster Rovers and was their first choice goalkeeper in 1993–94, but after just one season was on the move again, this time to Chesterfield. He played more than 40 games for Chesterfield and oversaw their promotion to Division Two and surprise run to the semi-finals of the FA Cup before retiring from professional football on 31 May 1997.

== Coaching career ==
Beasley was goalkeeping coach at Nottingham Forest under manager Paul Hart in the early 2000s, and took up the same role at Leeds United as part of Dennis Wise's new look coaching team in 2006. His services were dispensed with on 1 February 2012 after manager Simon Grayson was sacked.

On 29 November 2016, Beasley joined Chinese Super League side Shanghai Greenland Shenhua, as a member of coaching staff to Gustavo Poyet.

On 29 July 2022, Beasley was appointed as the goalkeeping coach for Indian Super League club Bengaluru.
