= 1996–97 Mansfield Town F.C. season =

Mansfield Town
1996–97 season
- Manager: Steve Parkin
- Stadium: Field Mill
- Third Division: 11th
- FA Cup: Second round
- League Cup: First round
- Football League Trophy: Second round

The 1996–97 season was Mansfield Town's 60th season in the Football League and 24th in the Third Division they finished in 11th position with 64 points.

== Final league table ==
Pos	Team	Pld	W	D	L	GF	GA	GD	Pts
9	Lincoln City	46	18	12	16	70	69	+1	66
10	Cambridge United	46	18	11	17	53	59	−6	65
11	Mansfield Town	46	16	16	14	47	45	+2	64
12	Scarborough	46	16	15	15	66	69	−3	63
13	Scunthorpe United	46	18	9	19	59	62	−3	63

Rules for classification: In the Football League goals scored (GF) takes precedence over goal difference (GD).

== Results ==
=== Football League Third Division ===
Match	Date	Opponent	Venue	Result	Attendance	Scorers
1	17 August 1996	Exeter City	H	0–1	2,149	
2	24 August 1996	Northampton Town	A	0–3	4,162	
3	27 August 1996	Hartlepool United	A	2–2	2,275	Sale, Hadley
4	31 August 1996	Rochdale	H	0–0	1,861	
5	7 September 1996	Doncaster Rovers	A	0–0	1,814	
6	10 September 1996	Barnet	H	0–0	1,505	
7	14 September 1996	Leyton Orient	H	0–2	1,839	
8	21 September 1996	Fulham	A	2–1	5,740	Hadley, Harper
9	28 September 1996	Hereford United	H	3–1	1,889	Doolan, Sedgemore, Walker
10	1 October 1996	Hull City	A	1–1	3,579	Eustace
11	5 October 1996	Carlisle United	A	1–1	5,509	Helliwell
12	12 October 1996	Swansea City	H	0–0	2,003	
13	15 October 1996	Wigan Athletic	H	0–1	1,942	
14	19 October 1996	Darlington	A	4–2	2,532	Hadley (2), Sale, Watkiss
15	26 October 1996	Scarborough	A	1–2	2,521	Kay (o.g.)
16	29 October 1996	Torquay United	H	1–2	1,632	Wood
17	2 November 1996	Scunthorpe United	H	2–0	2,210	Sedgemore, Kilcline
18	9 November 1996	Brighton & Hove Albion	A	1–1	1,933	Harper
19	23 November 1996	Lincoln City	A	0–0	3,548	
20	30 November 1996	Scarborough	H	2–0	1,981	Wood (2)
21	3 December 1996	Cambridge United	A	1–2	2,179	Kilcline
22	14 December 1996	Colchester United	H	1–1	1,653	Sale
23	21 December 1996	Cardiff City	A	1–1	2,238	Sale (2)
24	26 December 1996	Barnet	A	1–1	1,778	Primus (o.g.)
25	4 January 1997	Leyton Orient	A	1–2	3,422	Doolan
26	11 January 1997	Hereford United	A	1–0	1,873	Walker
27	18 January 1997	Hull City	H	1–0	2,286	Kilcline
28	21 January 1997	Doncaster Rovers	H	2–0	2,093	Eustace, Clarke
29	1 February 1997	Brighton & Hove Albion	H	1–1	2,456	Doolan
30	4 February 1997	Chester City	H	0–2	1,688	
31	8 February 1997	Scunthorpe United	A	2–0	2,600	Doolan, Martindale
32	15 February 1997	Lincoln City	H	2–2	3,037	Sedgemore, Martindale
33	18 February 1997	Torquay United	A	2–1	3,402	Clarke, Walker
34	22 February 1997	Chester City	A	0–1	2,385	
35	1 March 1997	Cambridge United	H	1–0	2,163	Doolan
36	8 March 1997	Cardiff City	A	1–3	2,569	Hackett
37	14 March 1997	Colchester United	A	1–2	3,064	Dunne (o.g.)
38	22 March 1997	Northampton Town	H	1–0	2,569	Eustace
39	29 March 1997	Exeter City	A	0–0	3,181	
40	31 March 1997	Hartlepool United	H	1–0	2,229	Sedgemore
41	5 April 1997	Rochdale	A	1–0	1,619	Cresswell
42	8 April 1997	Fulham	H	0–0	3,889	
43	11 April 1997	Carlisle United	H	0–0	4,375	
44	19 April 1997	Swansea City	A	2–3	4,786	Eustace, Ford
45	26 April 1997	Darlington	H	2–1	2,431	Doolan, Ford
46	3 May 1997	Wigan Athletic	A	0–2	7,106	

=== FA Cup ===
Round	Date	Opponent	Venue	Result	Attendance	Scorers
R1	16 November 1996	Consett	H	4–0	3,183	Wood, Eustace, Doolan, Ford
R2	7 December 1996	Stockport County	H	0–3	3,354	

=== League Cup ===
Round	Date	Opponent	Venue	Result	Attendance	Scorers
R1 1st leg	15 August 1996	Burnley	H	0–3	1,708	
R1 2nd leg	3 September 1996	Burnley	A	0–2	2,884	

=== League Trophy ===
Round	Date	Opponent	Venue	Result	Attendance	Scorers
R2	13 January 1997	Bury	A	0–6	1,331	

== Squad statistics ==
- Squad list sourced from 1996–97 Mansfield Town F.C. season at the English National Football Archive (subscription required)

Pos.	Name	League		FA Cup		League Cup		League Trophy		Total	
Pos.	Name	Apps	Goals	Apps	Goals	Apps	Goals	Apps	Goals	Apps	Goals
GK	(England) Ian Bowling	46	0	2	0	2	0	1	0	51	0
DF	(England) Mark Clifford	3	0	0	0	1	0	0	0	4	0
DF	(England) Warren Hackett	35(1)	1	1	0	2	0	1	0	39(1)	1
DF	(England) Leigh Holbrook	0(1)	0	0	0	0	0	0	0	0(1)	0
DF	(England) Brian Kilcline	30(1)	3	2	0	1	0	1	0	34(1)	3
DF	(England) Paul Sherlock	14(5)	0	0(1)	0	0(1)	0	0	0	14(7)	0
DF	(England) Stuart Watkiss	30(1)	1	1	0	1	0	0	0	32(1)	1
MF	(England) Darrell Clarke	17(2)	2	0(1)	0	0	0	0(1)	0	17(4)	2
MF	(England) John Doolan	41	6	2	1	2	0	1	0	46	7
MF	(England) Scott Eustace	41(1)	4	2	1	1	0	1	0	45(1)	5
MF	(England) Simon Ireland	5(1)	0	0(1)	0	2	0	0	0	7(2)	0
MF	(Scotland) David Kerr	9	0	0	0	1	0	0	0	10	0
MF	(England) Ian Robinson	3(5)	0	0	0	1(1)	0	0	0	4(6)	0
MF	(England) Ben Sedgemore	37(2)	4	1	0	0	0	1	0	39(2)	4
MF	(Scotland) Johnny Walker	33(3)	3	2	0	0	0	1	0	36(3)	3
MF	(England) Lee Williams	3(3)	0	0	0	0	0	0	0	3(3)	0
FW	(England) Iyseden Christie	8	0	0	0	0	0	0	0	8	0
FW	(England) Richard Cresswell	5	1	0	0	0	0	0	0	5	1
FW	(England) Tony Ford	25(2)	2	2	1	0	0	1	0	28(2)	3
FW	(England) Stewart Hadley	31(5)	4	2	0	1	0	1	0	35(5)	4
FW	(England) Steve Harper	37(3)	2	2	0	2	0	1	0	42(3)	2
FW	(England) Ian Helliwell	4(1)	1	0	0	0	0	0	0	4(1)	1
FW	(England) Glynn Hurst	5(1)	0	0	0	0	0	0(1)	0	5(2)	0
FW	(England) Gary Martindale	5	2	0	0	0	0	0	0	5	2
FW	(England) Mark Sale	12(6)	5	1	0	2	0	0	0	15(6)	5
FW	(England) Ryan Williams	4(12)	0	0(1)	0	2	0	0	0	6(13)	0
FW	(England) Simon Wood	23(8)	3	2	1	1	0	1	0	27(8)	4
FW	(England) Chris Young	0(1)	0	0	0	0	0	0	0	0(1)	0
–	Own goals	–	3	–	0	–	0	–	0	–	3
