= 1998–99 Mansfield Town F.C. season =

Mansfield Town
1998–99 season
- Manager: Steve Parkin
- Stadium: Field Mill
- Football League Third Division: 8th
- FA Cup: Second round
- League Cup: First round
- Football League Trophy: Second round
Home colours

During the 1998–99 English football season, Mansfield Town Football Club competed in the Football League Third Division where they finished in 8th position on 67 points, missing out on a play-off position by four points.

== Final league table ==
Pos	Team	Pld	W	D	L	GF	GA	GD	Pts	Promotion or relegation
6	Leyton Orient	46	19	15	12	68	59	+9	72	Qualification for the Third Division play-offs
7	Swansea City	46	19	14	13	56	48	+8	71	Qualification for the Third Division play-offs
8	Mansfield Town	46	19	10	17	60	58	+2	67	
9	Peterborough United	46	18	12	16	72	56	+16	66	
10	Halifax Town	46	17	15	14	58	56	+2	66	

Rules for classification: 1) Points; 2) Goals scored; 3) Goal difference

== Results ==
Mansfield Town's score comes first

=== Legend ===
Win	Draw	Loss

=== Football League Third Division ===
Match	Date	Opponent	Venue	Result	Attendance	Scorers
1	9 August 1998	Brentford	A	0–3	4,846	
2	15 August 1998	Plymouth Argyle	H	2–0	2,451	Peacock, Gibbs (o.g.)
3	22 August 1998	Scarborough	A	3–2	1,972	Christie, Peters, Kerr
4	29 August 1998	Swansea City	H	1–0	2,421	Christie
5	31 August 1998	Rotherham United	A	0–0	5,943	
6	5 September 1998	Darlington	H	0–1	2,428	
7	8 September 1998	Leyton Orient	A	1–1	3,186	Clarke
8	12 September 1998	Carlisle United	H	1–1	2,292	Clarke
9	19 September 1998	Scunthorpe United	A	2–3	3,554	Peacock, Harper
10	26 September 1998	Hull City	H	2–0	2,603	Christie (2)
11	3 October 1998	Exeter City	A	1–2	3,024	Lormor
12	9 October 1998	Torquay United	H	2–1	3,573	Lormor, Peacock
13	17 October 1998	Brighton & Hove Albion	A	3–1	2,808	Peacock, Clarke, Christie
14	20 October 1998	Southend United	A	2–1	3,205	Harper, Tallon
15	31 October 1998	Cambridge United	H	1–3	2,674	Peacock
16	7 November 1998	Rochdale	A	0–1	2,142	
17	10 November 1998	Hartlepool United	A	2–1	1,779	Lormor (2)
18	20 November 1998	Barnet	H	5–0	2,965	Peacock (2), Christie, Ford
19	27 November 1998	Halifax Town	A	2–2	3,227	Peacock, Ford
20	1 December 1998	Peterborough United	H	1–0	3,169	Peacock
21	11 December 1998	Shrewsbury Town	H	1–0	2,865	Peacock
22	19 December 1998	Cardiff City	A	2–4	9,013	Christie, Harper
23	26 December 1998	Scarborough	H	3–2	3,495	Williams, Harper, Ryder
24	28 December 1998	Chester City	A	1–1	3,320	Williams, Harper, Ryder
25	9 January 1999	Brentford	H	3–1	4,095	Harper, Christie, Lormor
26	16 January 1999	Plymouth Argyle	A	0–3	4,399	
27	22 January 1999	Rotherham United	H	0–3	3,586	
28	30 January 1999	Chester City	H	3–0	2,654	Lormor (2), Walker
29	3 February 1999	Darlington	A	1–5	2,708	Harper
30	13 February 1999	Leyton Orient	H	1–2	2,817	Peacock
31	20 February 1999	Carlisle United	A	0–0	2,273	
32	23 February 1999	Swansea City	A	0–1	4,361	
33	27 February 1999	Scunthorpe United	H	2–1	3,208	Peacock (2)
34	6 March 1999	Hull City	A	0–0	6,692	
35	13 March 1999	Rochdale	H	3–1	2,555	L'Helgoualch, Ryder, Clarke
36	20 March 1999	Cambridge United	A	2–7	4,343	Peacock, Lormor
37	28 March 1999	Peterborough United	H	0–1	5,507	
38	3 April 1999	Brighton & Hove Albion	H	2–0	3,015	Peacock, Kerr
39	5 April 1999	Torquay United	A	0–0	2,897	
40	10 April 1999	Southend United	H	0–0	2,624	
41	13 April 1999	Halifax Town	H	0–1	2,471	
42	17 April 1999	Barnet	A	0–0	1,861	
43	24 April 1999	Hartlepool United	H	2–0	3,373	Lormor, Williams
44	27 April 1999	Exeter City	H	0–1	2,830	
45	1 May 1999	Shrewsbury Town	A	0–1	2,553	
46	8 May 1999	Cardiff City	H	3–0	4,032	Lormor, Clarke, Peacock

=== FA Cup ===
Round	Date	Opponent	Venue	Result	Attendance	Scorers
R1	14 November 1998	Hayes	H	2–1	2,613	Lormor, Clarke
R2	5 December 1998	Southport	H	1–2	3,210	Lormor

=== League Cup ===
Round	Date	Opponent	Venue	Result	Attendance	Scorers
R1 1st leg	11 August 1998	Huddersfield Town	A	2–3	3,988	Christie, Peters
R1 2nd leg	18 August 1998	Huddersfield Town	H	1–1	2,936	Clarke

=== Football League Trophy ===
Round	Date	Opponent	Venue	Result	Attendance	Scorers
R1	8 December 1998	Manchester City	A	2–1	3,007	Peacock (2)
R2	5 January 1999	Lincoln City	A	0–1	2,329	

== Squad statistics ==
Pos.	Name	League		FA Cup		League Cup		League Trophy		Total	
Pos.	Name	Apps	Goals	Apps	Goals	Apps	Goals	Apps	Goals	Apps	Goals
GK	(England) Chris Adamson	2	0	0	0	0	0	0	0	2	0
GK	(England) Ian Bowling	37	0	2	0	2	0	2	0	43	0
GK	(England) Steve Cherry	1	0	0	0	0	0	0	0	1	0
GK	(England) Stuart Naylor	6	0	0	0	0	0	0	0	6	0
DF	(England) Craig Allardyce	6	0	0	0	0	0	0	0	6	0
DF	(England) Tony Ford	39(3)	2	2	0	2	0	2	0	45(3)	2
DF	(England) Warren Hackett	24(2)	0	2	0	2	0	1	0	29(2)	0
DF	(England) Steve Harper	45	6	2	0	2	0	2	0	51	6
DF	(England) Bobby Hassell	1(2)	0	0	0	0	0	0	0	1(2)	0
DF	(England) David Linighan	10	0	0	0	0	0	0	0	10	0
DF	(Wales) Mark Peters	37	1	2	0	2	1	2	0	43	2
DF	(England) Stuart Ryder	18(4)	2	0	0	0	0	1(1)	0	19(5)	2
DF	(England) John Schofield	37(5)	0	2	0	2	0	2	0	43(5)	0
DF	(England) Adam Willis	10	0	0	0	0	0	0	0	10	0
MF	(England) Darrell Clarke	24(9)	5	2	1	2	1	0	0	28(9)	7
MF	(Scotland) David Kerr	30(5)	2	0(1)	0	0(1)	0	1	0	31(7)	2
MF	(France) Cyrille L'Helgoualch	3(1)	1	0	0	0	0	0	0	3(1)	1
MF	(England) Jason Sedlan	1(4)	0	0	0	0	0	0(1)	0	1(5)	0
MF	(England) Michael Sisson	0(1)	0	0	0	0	0	0	0	0(1)	0
MF	(Republic of Ireland) Gary Tallon	31(5)	1	2	0	2	0	2	0	37(5)	1
MF	(Scotland) Johnny Walker	18(19)	1	2	0	0(1)	0	1	0	21(20)	1
MF	(England) Lee Williams	31(13)	2	0(1)	0	2	0	0(1)	0	33(15)	2
FW	(England) Matt Carruthers	0(5)	0	0	0	0	0	0	0	0(5)	0
FW	(England) Iyseden Christie	18(24)	8	0(2)	0	2	1	2	0	22(26)	9
FW	(England) Tony Lormor	35(6)	11	2	2	0(1)	0	2	0	39(7)	13
FW	(Scotland) Lee Peacock	42(3)	17	2	0	2	0	2	2	48(3)	19
FW	(England) Karl Rose	0(1)	0	0	0	0	0	0	0	0(1)	0
–	Own goals	–	1	–	0	–	0	–	0	–	1
