= 1997–98 Mansfield Town F.C. season =

English football team season

Mansfield Town
1997–98 season
- Manager: Steve Parkin
- Stadium: Field Mill
- Football League Third Division: 12th
- FA Cup: First round
- League Cup: First round
- Football League Trophy: Quarter-final
Home colours

During the 1997–98 English football season, Mansfield Town Football Club competed in the Football League Third Division where they finished in 12th position on 65 points.

== Final league table ==
Pos	Team	Pld	W	D	L	GF	GA	GD	Pts
10	Peterborough United	46	18	13	15	63	51	+12	67
11	Leyton Orient	46	19	12	15	62	47	+15	66 (Note: Leyton Orient had 3 points deducted.)
12	Mansfield Town	46	16	17	13	64	55	+9	65
13	Shrewsbury Town	46	16	13	17	61	62	−1	61
14	Chester City	46	17	10	19	60	61	−1	61

Rules for classification: In the Football League goals scored (GF) takes precedence over goal difference (GD).

== Results ==
Mansfield Town's score comes first

=== Legend ===
Win Draw Loss

=== Football League Third Division ===
Match	Date	Opponent	Venue	Result	Attendance	Scorers
1	9 August 1997	Hull City	H	2–0	4,627	Christie, Clarke
2	16 August 1997	Rochdale	A	0–2	2,113	
3	23 August 1997	Cardiff City	H	1–2	2,743	Doolan
4	30 August 1997	Scunthorpe United	A	0–1	3,414	
5	2 September 1997	Lincoln City	A	2–0	3,539	Christie, Whitehall
6	5 September 1997	Doncaster Rovers	H	1–1	2,874	Christie
7	13 September 1997	Notts County	A	0–1	6,706	
8	20 September 1997	Chester City	H	4–1	2,183	Whitehall (2), Ford, Christie
9	27 September 1997	Darlington	A	0–0	2,596	
10	4 October 1997	Colchester United	H	1–1	2,341	Whitehall
11	11 October 1997	Cambridge United	H	3–2	2,239	Whitehall (2), Christie
12	18 October 1997	Macclesfield Town	A	0–1	3,277	
13	21 October 1997	Swansea City	A	1–0	2,589	Clarke
14	25 October 1997	Barnet	H	1–2	2,340	Hackett
15	1 November 1997	Shrewsbury Town	A	2–3	2,338	Whitehall, Christie
16	4 November 1997	Rotherham United	H	3–3	2,927	Whitehall (2), Christie
17	8 November 1997	Scarborough	H	3–2	2,134	Whitehall, Harper, Peacock
18	18 November 1997	Exeter City	A	0–1	2,888	
19	22 November 1997	Peterborough United	A	1–1	6,202	Peacock
20	29 November 1997	Leyton Orient	H	0–0	2,806	
21	2 December 1997	Torquay United	A	1–2	1,440	Peacock
22	13 December 1997	Brighton & Hove Albion	H	1–1	2,197	Whitehall
23	20 December 1997	Hartlepool United	A	2–2	2,309	Christie, Sedgemore
24	28 December 1997	Lincoln City	H	2–2	3,449	Whitehall (2)
25	3 January 1998	Rochdale	H	3–0	2,303	Whitehall, Williams (2)
26	10 January 1998	Hull City	A	0–0	4,440	
27	17 January 1998	Scunthorpe United	H	1–0	2,375	Kerr
28	31 January 1998	Notts County	H	0–2	6,736	
29	3 February 1998	Doncaster Rovers	A	3–0	1,538	Whitehall, Harper, Eustace
30	7 February 1998	Chester City	A	1–0	2,055	Whitehall
31	13 February 1998	Colchester United	A	0–2	2,320	
32	17 February 1998	Cardiff City	A	1–4	2,451	Williams
33	21 February 1998	Darlington	H	4–0	2,071	Harper (3), Sedgemore
34	24 February 1998	Macclesfield Town	H	1–0	2,683	Peters
35	28 February 1998	Cambridge United	A	0–2	2,303	
36	3 March 1998	Scarborough	A	2–2	2,019	Christie, Clarke
37	7 March 1998	Shrewsbury Town	H	1–1	2,219	Peacock
38	14 March 1998	Rotherham United	A	2–2	4,054	Whitehall (2)
39	21 March 1998	Exeter City	H	3–2	2,033	Peters, Ford (2)
40	28 March 1998	Peterborough United	H	2–0	2,760	Whitehall, Tallon
41	4 April 1998	Leyton Orient	A	2–2	4,081	Whitehall, Clarke
42	11 April 1998	Torquay United	H	2–2	2,282	Whitehall, Peacock
43	13 April 1998	Brighton & Hove Albion	A	1–1	2,704	Christie
44	18 April 1998	Hartlepool United	H	2–2	2,047	Whitehall (2)
45	25 April 1998	Barnet	A	1–0	2,797	Whitehall (2)
46	2 May 1998	Swansea City	H	1–0	2,867	Kerr

=== FA Cup ===
Round	Date	Opponent	Venue	Result	Attendance	Scorers
R1	15 November 1997	Oldham Athletic	A	1–1	5,253	Whitehall
R1 Replay	25 November 1997	Oldham Athletic	H	0–1	4,097	

=== League Cup ===
Round	Date	Opponent	Venue	Result	Attendance	Scorers
R1 1st Leg	12 August 1997	Stockport County	H	4–2	2,170	Gannon (o.g.), Christie (3)
R1 2nd Leg	26 August 1997	Stockport County	A	3–6	2,840	Christie, Doolan, Ford

=== Football League Trophy ===
Round	Date	Opponent	Venue	Result	Attendance	Scorers
R2	7 January 1998	Wrexham	H	1–0	1,325	Whitehall
QF	27 January 1998	Preston North End	A	0–1	3,609	

== Squad statistics ==
Pos.	Name	League		FA Cup		League Cup		League Trophy		Total	
Pos.	Name	Apps	Goals	Apps	Goals	Apps	Goals	Apps	Goals	Apps	Goals
GK	(England) Ian Bowling	33	0	2	0	2	0	2	0	39	0
GK	(England) Paul Gibson	13	0	0	0	0	0	0	0	13	0
DF	(England) Scott Eustace	24(5)	1	2	0	2	0	0(1)	0	28(6)	1
DF	(England) Warren Hackett	23	1	2	0	0	0	0	0	25	1
DF	(England) Tony Ford	33(1)	3	0	0	2	1	2	0	37(1)	4
DF	(England) Steve Harper	46	5	2	0	2	0	2	0	52	5
DF	(England) Bobby Hassell	8(2)	0	0	0	0	0	0	0	8(2)	0
DF	(England) Scott Jones	6	0	0	0	2	0	0	0	8	0
DF	(Wales) Mark Peters	24	2	2	0	0	0	0	0	26	2
DF	(England) John Schofield	44	0	2	0	2	0	2	0	50	0
DF	(England) Jamie Squires	1	0	0	0	0	0	0	0	1	0
DF	(England) Stuart Thom	5	0	0	0	0	0	2	0	7	0
DF	(England) Stuart Watkiss	10	0	0	0	2	0	0	0	12	0
MF	(England) Darrell Clarke	26(9)	4	1	0	1	0	0(1)	0	28(10)	4
MF	(England) John Doolan	24	1	2	0	2	1	0	0	28	2
MF	(Scotland) David Kerr	7(11)	2	0	0	0	0	2	0	9(11)	2
MF	(England) Jonathan Milner	1(6)	0	0	0	0	0	0	0	1(6)	0
MF	(England) Ben Sedgemore	21(7)	2	1(1)	0	1	0	2	0	25(8)	2
MF	(England) Jason Sedlan	0(1)	0	0	0	0	0	0	0	0(1)	0
MF	(England) Michael Sisson	0(1)	0	0	0	0	0	0	0	0(1)	0
MF	(Republic of Ireland) Gary Tallon	26	1	0	0	0	0	2	0	28	1
MF	(Scotland) Johnny Walker	0(1)	0	0	0	0	0	0(1)	0	0(2)	0
MF	(England) Lee Williams	33(4)	3	2	0	0	0	2	0	37(4)	3
FW	(England) Iyseden Christie	26(13)	10	0(2)	0	2	4	0(1)	0	28(16)	12
FW	(England) Stewart Hadley	0(2)	0	0	0	0	0	0	0	0(2)	0
FW	(Scotland) Lee Peacock	25(7)	5	2	0	0	0	2	0	29(7)	5
FW	(England) Steve Whitehall	42(1)	25	2	1	2	0	2	1	48(1)	27
FW	(England) Neil Woods	5(1)	0	0	0	0	0	0	0	5(1)	0
–	Own goals	–	0	–	0	–	1	–	0	–	1
