= Simon Wood =

Simon Wood may refer to:

- Simon Wood (chef) (born 1977), British cook
- Simon Wood (footballer) (born 1976), English footballer
- Simon Wood (politician), Australian politician
- Simon Wood (diplomat), British diplomat
