= Darrell Clarke =

English football manager

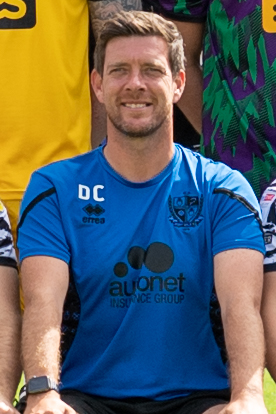
- Clarke in 2022

Personal information
- Full name: Darrell James Clarke
- Date of birth: 16 December 1977 (age 48)
- Place of birth: Mansfield, England
- Height: 5 ft 10 in (1.78 m)
- Position: Midfielder

Team information
- Current team: Tranmere Rovers (manager)

Youth career
- 1987–1995: Mansfield Town

Senior career*
Years	Team	Apps	(Gls)
1995–2001	Mansfield Town	159	(24)
2001–2007	Hartlepool United	127	(19)
2005	→ Stockport County (loan)	1	(0)
2005	→ Port Vale (loan)	1	(0)
2006–2007	→ Rochdale (loan)	12	(1)
2007–2013	Salisbury City	138	(12)
Total		438	(56)

Managerial career
- 2010–2013: Salisbury City
- 2014–2018: Bristol Rovers
- 2019–2021: Walsall
- 2021–2023: Port Vale
- 2023–2024: Cheltenham Town
- 2024–2025: Barnsley
- 2025: Bristol Rovers
- 2026–: Tranmere Rovers
- * Club domestic league appearances and goals

Darrell James Clarke (born 16 December 1977) is an English professional football manager and former player who is the manager of EFL League Two club Tranmere Rovers.

A box-to-box midfielder, Clarke began his career with Mansfield Town in 1995, where he spent the first six years of his career, making 173 league and cup appearances. In 2001, he transferred to Hartlepool United, where he spent another six years, making a further 136 appearances. He was sent out on loan to Stockport County, Port Vale, and Rochdale in the final years of his spell. In 2007, he left the professional game to sign for Salisbury City before taking up the management position at the club in 2010. He led the club to promotion into the Conference Premier from the Southern League with two play-off final victories in three seasons.

He was appointed manager of Bristol Rovers in March 2014 but could not prevent the club from dropping out of the English Football League. However, one year later, Clarke successfully guided Bristol Rovers back into the Football League after winning the 2015 Conference Premier play-off final and then went on to take the club into League One with promotion out of League Two in 2015–16. At the time of his departure in December 2018, he was the fourth-longest serving manager in the EFL. He was appointed manager at Walsall in May 2019 and left the club in February 2021 to manage League Two rivals Port Vale. He led the club to promotion with victory in the 2022 play-off final before being sacked in April 2023. He took charge at Cheltenham Town in October 2023 and then switched to Barnsley in May 2024, where he was sacked after nine months in charge. He returned to Bristol Rovers in May 2025, but was sacked after seven months. In May 2026, Clarke was appointed as Tranmere Rovers manager.

== Early and personal life ==
Born in Mansfield, Nottinghamshire, Clarke stated that he was "brought up on a rough estate" in Ladybrook. His mother died in a car crash when Clarke was aged two and he and his brother, Wayne, were raised by his grandparents as his father was an alcoholic. His grandfather was a steward at Mansfield Town. He is a boyhood Manchester United fan. His eldest daughter, Ellie, died on Valentine's Day 2022 in what was ruled as a suicide by an inquest, though Clarke maintains was "a cry for help that went drastically wrong".

== Playing career ==
=== Mansfield Town ===
Clarke was an energetic box-to-box midfielder with an eye for goal. However, defending was his weakness. He started his career at Mansfield Town when he joined their youth set-up at the age of just 10. He made his way through the ranks and was offered a professional contract at Field Mill by Andy King in 1995. Clarke made his first-team debut on 21 December 1996, coming on as a half-time substitute for Ben Sedgemore in a 2–1 defeat at Cardiff City. He marked his home debut at Field Mill with a goal in a 2–0 victory over Doncaster Rovers. The "Stags" struggled near the foot of the Third Division in 1995–96, rising to mid-table in 1996–97 and 1997–98, before finishing one place outside the play-offs in 1998–99. They then dropped back into the lower half of the table in 1999–2000 and 2000–01 after manager Steve Parkin was replaced by Bill Dearden. While at Mansfield, he became a fan favourite due partly to his high work rate; he made 173 league and cup appearances for the club, scoring 27 goals.

=== Hartlepool United ===
Clarke was signed to Hartlepool United by Chris Turner in July 2001 on a free transfer, courtesy of the Bosman ruling, but Hartlepool still had to pay £70,000 as he was under 24. He was seen by many as the replacement for Tommy Miller. Clarke originally failed to cement his place in the starting 11 and found himself in and out of the team, making 26 league starts and 9 substitute appearances. However, he still managed to score seven league goals, including a hat-trick in a 7–1 win over Swansea City. The following season was much more successful for Clarke as he played in nearly all of Hartlepool's matches and added another seven goals to his tally in Hartlepool's promotion winning campaign. The arrival of manager Neale Cooper saw Clarke's opportunities in the first-team in 2003–04 limited, as Eifion Williams was preferred on the right wing. Clarke only started 23 league matches, but he still managed to make a further 12 substitute appearances.

In the 2004–05 season, Clarke suffered a knee injury that prevented him from participating in any of Hartlepool's league games. He was loaned out to Stockport County — managed by former Hartlepool boss Chris Turner — to gain fitness in January, but this was cut short as Clarke picked up another knee problem after just one game. His knee injury caused him to miss the second half of the campaign. In September 2005 Clarke was loaned to Port Vale, but played just two minutes after being utilised as a late substitute by manager Martin Foyle. Despite his return to full fitness being described by manager Martin Scott as a 'massive boost', his appearances were again limited once he returned to Victoria Park. In July 2006 he was loaned to Rochdale, where he made 12 appearances, scoring one goal. He was released by Hartlepool manager Danny Wilson in May 2007.

=== Salisbury City ===
On 3 July 2007, he signed for newly-promoted Conference Premier club Salisbury City. He was strongly influenced by former teammate Tommy Widdrington to make the switch south, and was the third signing made by Nick Holmes. He helped the club avoid relegation in the 2008–09 season, which was a good achievement for the club. At the beginning of the 2009–10 season he became Salisbury's most senior player. He was duly given the captain's armband by Widdrington, who had recently been appointed manager. He captained the club to a mid-table finish. However, Salisbury were demoted down into the Southern League Premier Division as punishment for their severe financial problems. He also spent his spare time coaching the under-8s at Portsmouth.

== Management career ==
=== Salisbury City ===
In July 2010, Tommy Widdrington left Salisbury City for the job of assistant manager at Southend United. As a result of this, Clarke became joint caretaker manager beside Mikey Harris. The next month he was made player-manager permanently, with Harris as his assistant. He needed to secure an immediate promotion to maintain the funding to keep the club a full-time professional organisation and so recruited young players freshly released from Football League clubs. However, he lost top-scorer Matt Tubbs, who was sold for a club record £55,000 to Crawley Town. After his first season, the "Whites" won promotion from the Southern League Premier Division via the play-offs, winning 3–2 on penalties after a 2–2 draw with Hednesford Town.

Clarke led Salisbury to the second round of the FA Trophy in his second season in charge. He also made history when his side beat Grimsby Town in the FA Cup Second Round, taking Salisbury to the third round of the FA Cup for the first time in the club's history, where they faced Sheffield United at Bramall Lane. At the start of the campaign he had stated his intention to sign promising young players, and during the January transfer window he signed 19-year-old Matt Clark and former England youth player Abdulai Bell-Baggie, as well as 29-year-old striker Robbie Matthews. However, he also placed winger Charlie Knight on the transfer list along with striker Jake Reid, defender Josh Casey, and winger Adam Kelly. They finished the 2011–12 campaign comfortably in tenth place, and Clarke extended his contract at the club to another season.

Clarke's pre-season signings for 2012–13 included Jamie White from Winchester City, James Clarke from Oxford City, and Theo Lewis after his release from Cheltenham Town. By April, these signings proved successful and helped Salisbury take second place in the Conference South. The team's success saw him strongly linked with the vacant management position at Hartlepool United in October 2012, though he ultimately remained at Salisbury. The club finished four points behind champions Welling United and had to make do with a play-off place. Promotion was secured with a 3–2 extra time victory over Dover Athletic in the play-off final.

=== Bristol Rovers ===
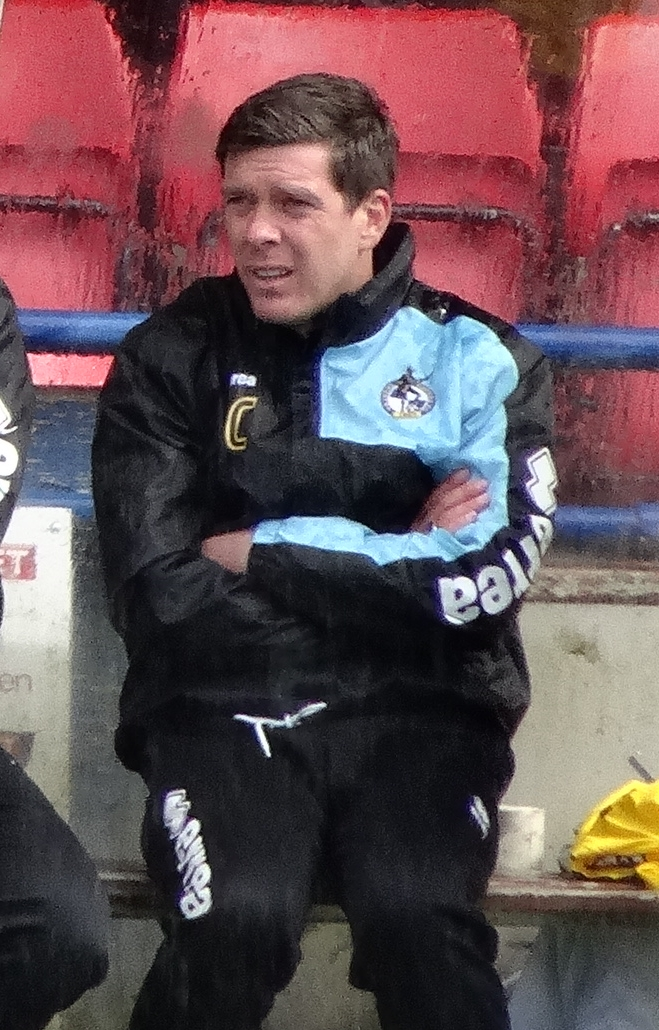
Clarke as manager of Bristol Rovers in 2016

In June 2013, Clarke was appointed as assistant manager of League Two club Bristol Rovers, supporting John Ward. Following another season of struggle at Rovers, Ward was moved to a role as Director of football and was replaced as manager by Clarke in March 2014. His first game on 29 March ended with a 1–0 victory over Morecambe at the Memorial Stadium, and Clarke said that "I tried to get my philosophy across today and I think we did it in spells and we need to more of that". Rovers were relegated out of the Football League on the final day of the 2013–14 after a 1–0 defeat to Mansfield Town; a draw would have been enough to keep the club up, as they were relegated on goal difference.

He oversaw a rapid turnover of players for the 2014–15 season, releasing 16 players and signing 13 players on free transfers, including striker Matty Taylor. His first task However, was to remove 'Clarke Out' posters that had been placed around the training ground by disgruntled fans. After a poor start Rovers rose up the table and ended the campaign in second place, one point behind Barnet. Clarke led Rovers to promotion with a 5–3 penalty shoot-out victory over Grimsby Town at Wembley Stadium in the 2015 Conference Premier play-off final on 17 May 2015, following a 1–1 draw after extra time. He won three Manager of the Month awards during the season, in September, December and February. Rovers achieved a second-successive promotion with a third-place finish in League Two in the 2015–16 campaign. Clarke was named as Manager of the Month for March after winning six of seven games by "playing exciting and attacking football" according to head judge George Burley. Promotion was achieved on the final day of the season with a stoppage-time winner against Dagenham & Redbridge, which took them above Accrington Stanley into third place. Named as the Football League manager of the week, his citation stated that "Clarke has performed wonders as his men have stormed up the table". On 27 May 2016, Clarke turned down the opportunity to manage Championship club Leeds United and signed a new three-year contract with Bristol Rovers. He had met Leeds chairman Massimo Cellino but rejected the opportunity after Cellino told him he wanted an active role in player recruitment.

Speaking after an FA Cup second round defeat to National League side Barrow in December 2016, Clarke said it might be the "end of the road" for some of his squad and urged investment in the playing squad. He was named as EFL manager of the week after overseeing a 5–0 victory over Northampton Town on 7 January. However, that month he lost Matty Taylor after Bristol City activated his £300,000 release clause to make Taylor the first player to move from Rovers to City in 30 years. During late March 2017, with his club sitting just outside the League One play off places, Norwich City were reported to be interested in Clarke following the sacking of previous manager Alex Neil. Whilst Clarke never turned down any potential offer he instead pledged his loyalty to Rovers, the announcement coming a day after his three-year anniversary of his first Rovers match in charge. Rovers finished in 10th-place in 2016–17.

In June 2017, Clarke signed a new five-year contract. He was named as EFL manager of the week after overseeing a 6–0 win away at Northampton Town on 7 October despite missing his preferred centre-backs. However, speaking later in December he said he felt "let down" by the club for its wage policy and infrastructure, saying they were "30 years behind" other clubs. He further admitted some of his players were struggling with the increased expectations following recent successes, though Rovers still managed to end the 2017–18 campaign in 13th-place. Billy Bodin was sold to Preston North End for an undisclosed fee in January 2018. In June 2018 he graduated with the FA's highest coaching qualification (FA Level 5 UEFA Pro). The following month he sold forward Ellis Harrison to Ipswich Town for an undisclosed fee believed to be in the region of £750,000. He left his post on 13 December 2018 following a run of seven defeats in ten matches; at the time of his departure he was the fourth-longest serving manager in the EFL.

=== Walsall ===
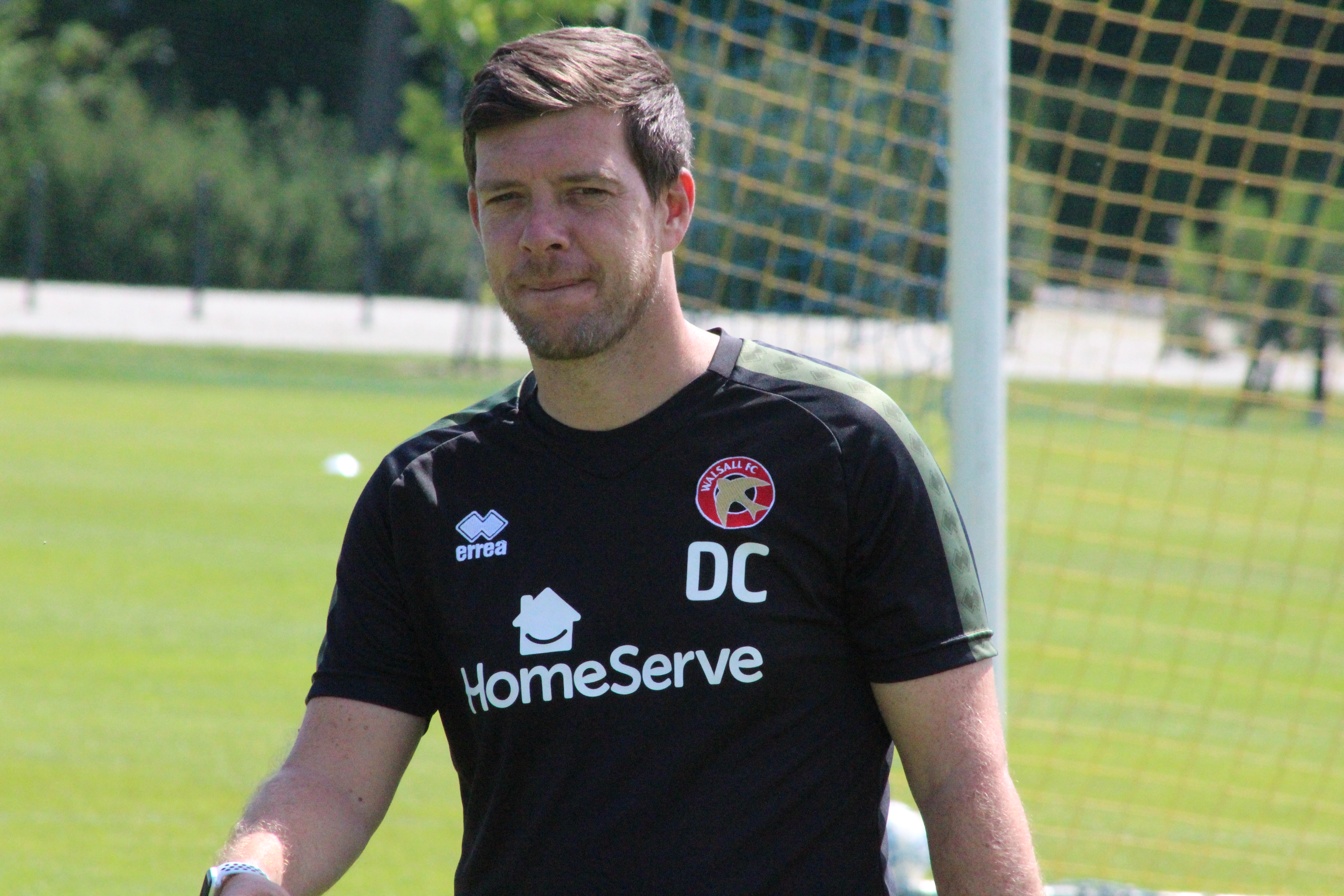
Clarke managing Walsall in 2019

On 10 May 2019, Clarke signed a three-year contract to become Walsall's new manager following their relegation into League Two at the end of the 2018–19 season. He signed 16 players as 23 departed – including midfielder George Dobson, who was sold to Sunderland – and got off to a poor start after Walsall picked up just one win the opening ten games of the 2019–20 campaign, with the team sound defensively but failing to create any chances in a 5–3–2 formation. Form improved as Clarke switched to a 4–4–2 formation and got the best out of 22-year-old Wes McDonald, However, a run of six league defeats began in October and drew the club into a relegation battle, though was immediately followed by a run of only two defeats in 11 league games. Walsall were in mid-table when the season was ended early due to the COVID-19 pandemic in England and Walsall Supporters' Trust secretary Steve Davies said that the team were "starting to gel and the signing of Wes McDonald was key". Clarke went on to admit that the following campaign would likely see him focus more on youth as the club faced a challenging financial future due to the effects of the pandemic. He left the Bescot Stadium midway through the 2020–21 season with Walsall 11th in the table after Port Vale agreed to pay Walsall a compensation package.

=== Port Vale ===
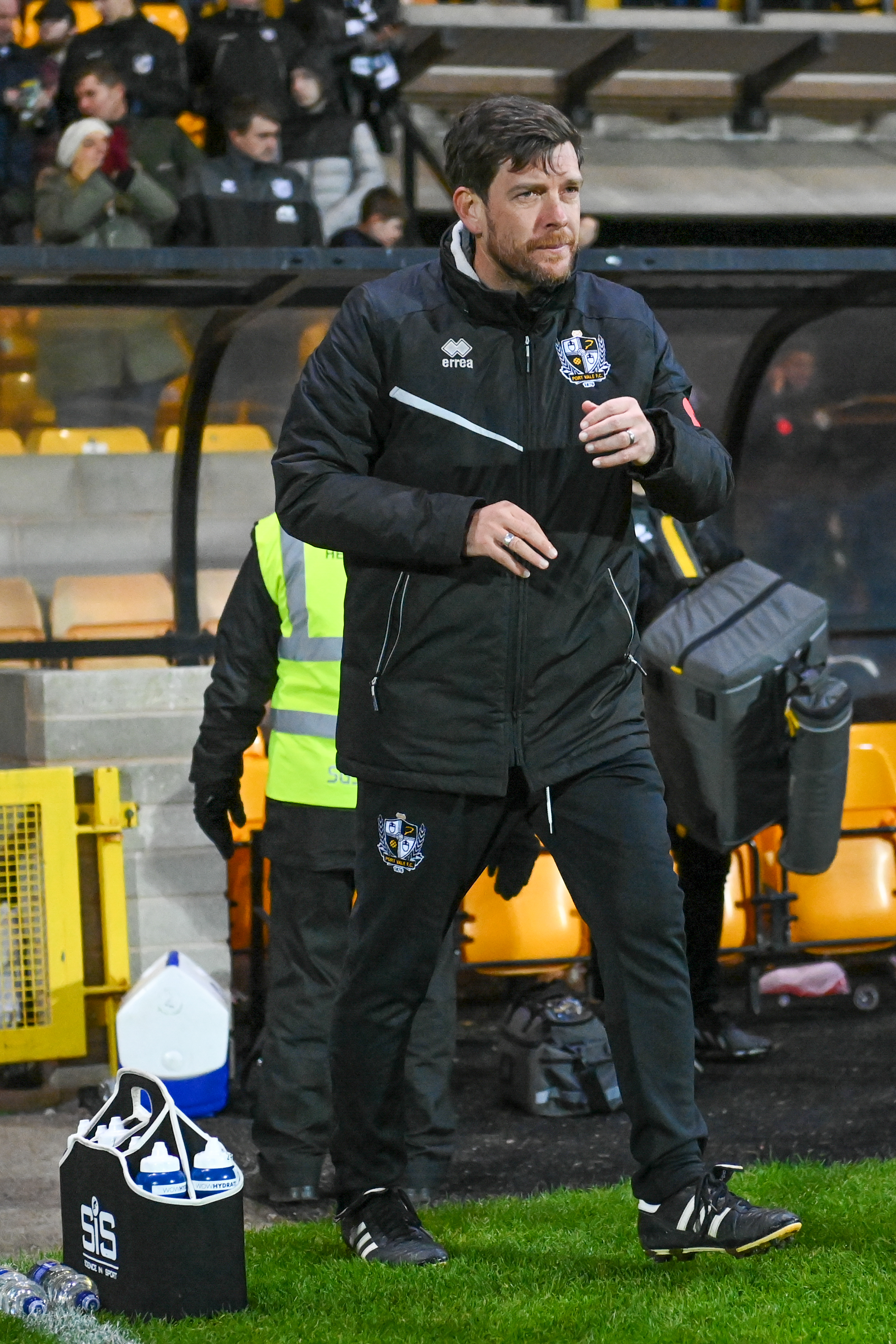
Clarke as manager of Port Vale in 2021

On 15 February 2021, Clarke was appointed as manager of Port Vale, who were 18th in League Two and without a permanent manager since the departure of John Askey at the start of January. He arrived a week after David Flitcroft's appointment as director of football. It took him eight games to get his first win as Vale manager, which came in a 2–1 victory over Newport County on 16 March at Vale Park. This was the first of six successive victories, the longest winning streak for the club since March 1996. He was nominated for the League Two Manager of the Month award after his team picked up 16 out of an available 18 points in April, conceding just a single goal in the process. Port Vale ended the 2020–21 season in 13th-place and Clarke said that "I can't wait to get rid of the deadwood if I am honest". He released all 15 out of contract players and placed a further three contracted players on the transfer-list.

Clarke and Flitcroft recruited 12 players for the start of the 2021–22 season, including Ben Garrity, Jamie Proctor and James Wilson. Clarke was named as September's Manager of the Month award after overseeing a run of three wins from four games which took his side into the automatic promotion places. He also won October's award after Vale secured a further 13 points, during which time they scored at least three goals in five of their six games; in doing so he became the first Port Vale boss to win the award two months running. Nine players left the club in the January transfer window, whilst eight signings were made, including Connor Hall and Chris Hussey.

On 15 February, Clarke took a leave period after a close family bereavement, with Andy Crosby standing in during his absence. On 30 March, it was confirmed that Clarke would be returning to the club to support Crosby until the end of the season before taking charge again in the summer. Clarke completed a phased return to the manager role on 6 May. Vale qualified for the play-off semi-finals. Clarke was sent off in extra-time of the second leg for an altercation with Swindon Town's Dion Conroy, and had to witness Vale's penalty shoot-out victory from the stands. He apologised for his behaviour and went on to say that: "We've got one more game to go against Mansfield, which is fitting because it's where my eldest daughter came from.... it'll be an emotional day but I'm looking forward to the final." He signed a new five-year contract two days before the final. Vale eased to victory in the final with a 3–0 victory and Clarke dedicated the win to his daughter, Ellie, who had died in February. Clarke was one of eleven managers who received special recognition at the 41st Football Writers Awards dinner for their work during the 2021–22 season.

Clarke was linked with the vacant management position at Portsmouth in January 2023, though stated that "I am really happy here [at Port Vale]". On 17 April 2023, Clarke was sacked following run of two wins in 18 games that left the club 18th in League One. He released a statement two weeks later which stated: "Port Vale and its incredible fanbase will always hold a place in my and my family's hearts. The journey we travelled together, on and off the pitch, can never be erased. I will never be able to repay you as people for how you were there for us in our darkest hour, and for that we will be eternally grateful".

=== Cheltenham Town ===
On 29 September 2023, Clarke signed a two-year deal to manage Cheltenham Town, who were bottom of League One without a victory or goal scored from their opening nine games of the 2023–24 season. Before taking charge on 2 October, Clarke watched his new side lose 2–0 at Lincoln City on 30 September. Cheltenham lost their first game under Clarke, defeated 2–0 at Whaddon Road by Fleetwood Town on 3 October, extending the goalless run to a record eleven league games. He put his trust in the experienced players in the squad, leaving the younger loanee players struggling to make the bench. Cheltenham won their first game under Clarke on 21 October, a 1–0 victory over Cambridge United at Whaddon Road. He was nominated for the EFL League One Manager of the Month award for October, with the EFL reporting that "to instil spirit and belief so quickly has been astonishing with six goals, seven points in five games". Cheltenham were relegated on the final day following defeat to Stevenage.

=== Barnsley ===
On 23 May 2024, Clarke was appointed head coach of League One side Barnsley on a two-year contract with the option for a third. He signed Conor Hourihane as a player-coach. The "Tykes" enjoyed a good start to the 2024–25 season, though were beaten 7–0 by Manchester United at Old Trafford in the EFL Cup. On 12 March 2025, Clarke was sacked with the club sitting tenth in the league following a run of poor form that saw them drop out of the play-offs.

=== Return to Bristol Rovers ===
On 6 May 2025, Clarke was reappointed as head coach of Bristol Rovers on a three-year deal. He succeeded Iñigo Calderón, who left following Rovers' relegation to League Two. On 9 December 2025, a 4–0 thrashing away at Barnet saw Rovers suffer their ninth consecutive league defeat, a club record. He was sacked four days later, following a record-extending tenth straight defeat that saw the club drop into the relegation zone.

=== Tranmere Rovers ===
On 26 May 2026, Clarke was appointed as manager of League Two club Tranmere Rovers on a two-year contract. Upon his arrival at Prenton Park, he said that he was attracted to the job because there were few players still in contract and a rebuild into a new squad was possible. Key signings included Tom Ince, Will Vaulks, Jordan Davies and Harrison Male as Rovers looked to improve on the previous season's 21st-place finish.

== Management style ==
Clarke is flexible with his formations and is open to different styles of play rather than sticking to a rigid philosophy. He believes that "adaptability is key". However, he does have a preference for playing with two strikers. He is known for his intense training sessions, and for producing extremely detailed reports on opposition teams. In his first spell at Bristol Rovers, his team played an attacking, passing style and scored an average of close to two goals per game. A motivational manager, he sees a happy dressing room as an essential part of a winning team, and has been described as having a bubbly and infectious personality, though he has been quoted as saying "I'm not a cuddling manager... soft players don't win you promotions". His personality traits make him an energetic, passionate, and frank manager. He prefers to maintain a big squad of players, and to regularly rotate his starting line-ups.

"I didn't want to take a job where success was staying in the division... I like promotions. I like that feeling of working towards a goal.

— Clarke talking about his motivations, January 2020.

== Career statistics ==
=== As a player ===
Appearances and goals by club, season and competition
Club	Season	League			FA Cup		League Cup		Other		Total	
Club	Season	Division	Apps	Goals	Apps	Goals	Apps	Goals	Apps	Goals	Apps	Goals
Mansfield Town	1995–96	Third Division	3	0	0	0	0	0	0	0	3	0
Mansfield Town	1996–97	Third Division	17	2	0	0	0	0	0	0	17	2
Mansfield Town	1997–98	Third Division	35	4	1	0	1	0	1 (Note: Appearance(s) in Football League Trophy)	0	38	4
Mansfield Town	1998–99	Third Division	33	5	2	1	2	1	0	0	37	7
Mansfield Town	1999–2000	Third Division	39	7	1	0	0	0	2	0	42	7
Mansfield Town	2000–01	Third Division	32	6	0	0	4	1	0	0	36	7
Mansfield Town	Total		159	24	4	1	7	2	3	0	173	27
Hartlepool United	2001–02	Third Division	35	7	1	1	1	0	0	0	37	8
Hartlepool United	2002–03	Third Division	45	7	1	0	1	0	0	0	47	7
Hartlepool United	2003–04	Second Division	35	5	2	0	2	0	1	2	40	7
Hartlepool United	2004–05	League One	0	0	0	0	0	0	0	0	0	0
Hartlepool United	2005–06	League One	12	0	0	0	0	0	0	0	12	0
Hartlepool United	2006–07	League Two	0	0	—		—		—		0	0
Hartlepool United	Total		127	19	4	1	4	0	1	2	136	22
Stockport County (loan)	2004–05	League One	1	0	—		—		—		1	0
Port Vale (loan)	2005–06	League One	1	0	—		—		—		1	0
Rochdale (loan)	2006–07	League Two	12	1	0	0	0	0	0	0	12	1
Salisbury City	2007–08	Conference Premier	33	4	2	0	—		1 (Note: Appearance in Conference League Cup)	0	36	4
Salisbury City	2008–09	Conference Premier	39	4	1	0	—		2 (Note: One appearance in Conference League Cup, one in FA Trophy)	0	42	4
Salisbury City	2009–10	Conference Premier	43	3	3	0	—		7 (Note: Appearance(s) in FA Trophy)	1	53	4
Salisbury City	2010–11	Southern League; Premier Division					—					
Salisbury City	2011–12	Conference South	19	1	4	0	—		1	0	24	1
Salisbury City	2012–13	Conference South	4	0	0	0	—		0	0	4	0
Salisbury City	Total		138	12	10	0	—		11	1	159	13
Career total			438	56	18	2	11	2	15	3	482	63

=== As a manager ===
As of match played 21 November 2026

Managerial record by team and tenure
Team	From	To	Record					Ref.
Team	From	To	P	W	D	L	Win %	Ref.
Salisbury City	4 August 2010	14 June 2013	157	84	35	38	53.5	
Bristol Rovers	28 March 2014	13 December 2018	246	104	56	86	42.3	
Walsall	10 May 2019	15 February 2021	76	25	25	26	32.9	
Port Vale (Note: Clarke entered a period of compassionate leave of absence on 15 February 2022 following a close family bereavement, with Andy Crosby taking charge of first-team affairs in his absence (P17 W9 D4 L4). These matches are included in Clarke's record.)	15 February 2021	17 April 2023	124	52	27	45	41.9	
Cheltenham Town	29 September 2023 (Note: Clarke's appointment was announced on 29 September, but he did not take charge until 2 October. Cheltenham's 2–0 defeat at Lincoln City on 30 September was overseen by caretaker manager Kevin Russell.)	23 May 2024	39	12	7	20	30.8	
Barnsley	23 May 2024	12 March 2025	44	17	9	18	38.6	
Bristol Rovers	6 May 2025	13 December 2025	27	8	4	15	29.6	
Tranmere Rovers	26 May 2026	present	20	6	9	5	30.0	
Total			717	300	168	249	41.8	

== Honours ==
=== As a player ===
Hartlepool United

- Football League Third Division second-place promotion: 2002–03

=== As a player-manager ===
Salisbury City

- Southern Football League Premier Division play-offs: 2011
- Conference South play-offs: 2013

=== As a manager ===
Bristol Rovers

- Conference Premier play-offs: 2015
- Football League Two third-place promotion: 2015–16

Port Vale

- EFL League Two play-offs: 2022

Individual

- Conference Premier Manager of the Month: September 2014, December 2014, February 2015
- EFL League Two Manager of the Month: March 2016, September 2021, October 2021
