= Ilkeston Town F.C. =

Association football club in Ilkeston, Derbyshire, England

Coordinates: 52°59′02″N 1°18′01″W

Ilkeston Town
- Full name: Ilkeston Town Football Club
- Nickname: The Robins
- Founded: 2017
- Ground: New Manor Ground
- Capacity: 3,029
- Owner: Andrew Nally
- Chairman: Andrew Nally
- Manager: Ryan Hindley
- League: Northern Premier League Premier Division
- 2025–26: Northern Premier League Premier Division, 11th of 21
- Website: www.ilkestontownfc.co.uk
| Home colours | Away colours |

Ilkeston Town Football Club is a football club based in Ilkeston, Derbyshire, England. They currently play in the Northern Premier League Premier Division.

== History ==
On 30 June 2017, a company, Ilkeston Town F.C. Ltd was registered at Companies House. On 20 July 2017, it was confirmed that Ilkeston Town was bought by Alan Hardy. The club was formed in July 2017 after the previous football club in the town, Ilkeston F.C., folded months earlier. Taking the name of two earlier clubs to represent the town, Ilkeston Town were admitted into the Midland Football League as a late entry for their inaugural season, and were allocated a place in Division One.

In their first season, Ilkeston finished 2nd in the league on 95 points, 15 behind runaway league champions Walsall Wood, to gain promotion to the Midland Football League Premier Division.

The 2018–19 season would be much more successful for the Robins as they clinched the Midland Football League Premier Division title on 27 March 2019 and to earn their second promotion in two seasons as a club. They won the title in style, beating Loughborough University 8–1 on the final day of the season, pipping Walsall Wood to a spot in Step 4 on goal difference.

On 16 October 2019, Alan Hardy sold the club to then Manager Mark Clifford.

On 27 November 2019, Mark Clifford announced a restructure at the club. As part of this restructure, the club appointed Martin Carruthers as Manager, reuniting him with Clifford with whom he had worked at Basford United F.C.

On 3 November 2021, Mark Clifford announced he was to step down from his role as chairman and hand sole control of the club to local businessmen David Hilton and Andrew Nally, whom had helped oversee extensive improvements to the club's ground, including the installation of a state-of-the-art 3G pitch, with further plans in place to expand and renovate the New Manor Ground facilities.

Ilkeston Town won the Northern Premier League - Division One Midlands title for the 2021–22 season, gaining the team automatic promotion and on 13 May 2022, the FA's National League System allocated Ilkeston Town F.C. to the Southern Football League for the 2022/23 season.

On 10 June 2022, Ilkeston Town announced a new sponsorship deal with Microlise - A two-year deal which will see the New Manor Ground renamed as the "Microlise New Manor Ground".

== Current squad ==
=== First team ===
As of 19 August 2026

Note: Flags indicate national team as defined under FIFA eligibility rules; some limited exceptions apply. Players may hold more than one non-FIFA nationality.

| No. | Pos. | Nation | Player |
|---|---|---|---|
| — | GK | IRL | Theo Avery |
| — | GK | ENG | Sam Wilson |
| — | DF | SDN | Elwalid Elhaghany |
| — | DF | ENG | Logan Green |
| — | DF | ENG | Pharrell Johnson |
| — | DF | ENG | Lynden Joyce |
| — | DF | ENG | Cashmere Rowe |
| — | DF | WAL | Noah Simmons |
| — | MF | ENG | Lewis Belgrave |

| No. | Pos. | Nation | Player |
|---|---|---|---|
| — | MF | ENG | Colin Daniel |
| — | MF | ENG | Sam Newell |
| — | MF | ENG | Luis Parkes |
| — | MF | ENG | Fedel Ross-Lang |
| — | MF | ENG | Jordan Stevens |
| — | FW | PAK | McKeal Abdullah |
| — | FW | JAM | Anthony Dwyer |
| — | FW | ENG | Ashley Hunter |
| — | FW | ENG | Jevin Seaton |
| — | FW | ENG | Harry Wakefield |

=== Out on loan ===
Note: Flags indicate national team as defined under FIFA eligibility rules; some limited exceptions apply. Players may hold more than one non-FIFA nationality.

| No. | Pos. | Nation | Player |
|---|---|---|---|
| — | FW | ENG | Dylan Reason (at Grantham Town until 14 September 2026) |

== Under 23 team ==
On 16 May 2020, Ilkeston Town FC announced plans to run an U23 team for the 2020–21 season. The side was managed by Anthony Spencer, who also headed up the club's academy. The U23 side was disbanded in 2021 to be taken over by and relocated to Nottingham club Clifton All Whites F.C.

== Records ==
- Best FA Cup performance: 4th qualifying round (2020–21)
- Best FA Trophy performance: 2nd round (2025–26)
- Best FA Vase performance: 3rd round (2018–19)
