= John Schofield (footballer) =

English professional football coach and former player

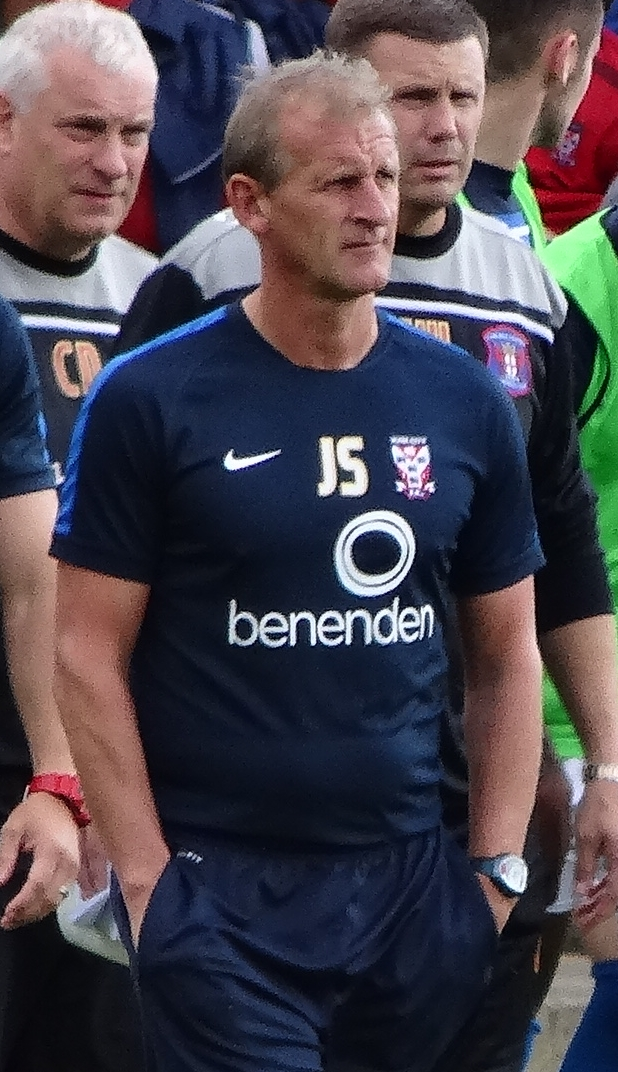
- Schofield as assistant manager of York City in 2015

Personal information
- Full name: John David Schofield
- Date of birth: 16 May 1965 (age 61)
- Place of birth: Barnsley, England
- Height: 5 ft 11 in (1.80 m)
- Position: Midfielder

Team information
- Current team: Scunthorpe United (assistant manager)

Youth career
- 1983–1984: Huddersfield Town

Senior career*
Years	Team	Apps	(Gls)
1983–1985	Woolley Miners Welfare		
1985–1987	Shepshed Charterhouse		
1987–1988	Matlock Town		
1988	Gainsborough Trinity		
1988–1994	Lincoln City	231	(11)
1994–1997	Doncaster Rovers	110	(12)
1997–1999	Mansfield Town	86	(0)
1999–2000	Hull City	25	(0)
2000–2001	Lincoln City	19	(0)
Total		471	(23)

Managerial career
- 2006–2007: Lincoln City
- 2009: Walsall (caretaker)
- 2009: Cheltenham Town (caretaker)
- 2013: Gillingham (caretaker)
- 2021–2023: Northern Ireland U21
- * Club domestic league appearances and goals

John David Schofield (born 16 May 1965) is an English football coach and former professional footballer who is assistant manager at National League club Scunthorpe United.

As a player, he was a midfielder. He spent twelve seasons in the basement division of the Football League with Lincoln City, Doncaster Rovers, Mansfield Town and Hull City, making a total of 547 league and cup appearances after turning professional at the age of 23. He was named Lincoln City's Player of the Year in 1994. Before this, he had spells in non-League with Woolley Miners Welfare, Shepshed Charterhouse, Matlock Town and Gainsborough Trinity. Following his retirement, Schofield held various coaching roles back with Lincoln City, where he eventually became manager and led the club to the League Two play-offs during the 2006–07 season. He has since held a variety of different positions on the coaching staff at Scunthorpe United, Walsall, Cheltenham Town, Cambridge United, Notts County, Gillingham, Scunthorpe United, York City, Doncaster Rovers, Peterborough United, Port Vale. He also managed the Northern Ireland U21 team from 2021 to 2023.

== Playing career ==
=== Non-League ===
Schofield was born in Barnsley, West Riding of Yorkshire. A hard-working and combative midfielder, he began his career in non-League football, combining this with his job as an apprentice-trained motor mechanic. As a teenager, he had spent a season with Huddersfield Town's reserve team before joining Northern Counties East League side Woolley Miners Welfare. He moved up the non-League pyramid, joining first Southern League Premier Division side Shepshed Charterhouse and then Matlock Town of the Northern Premier League Premier Division. In March 1988, he joined Gainsborough Trinity, also of the Northern Premier League Premier Division.

=== Lincoln City ===
Lincoln City manager Colin Murphy signed him for a £10,000 fee on 10 November 1988. Schofield made his debut in a 4–1 win over Fourth Division leaders Burnley at Turf Moor. He scored his first goal at Sincil Bank in a 4–3 victory over Wrexham on 14 January 1989. Schofield quickly established himself in the Lincoln team, making 31 appearances in the number 4 shirt in the 1988–89 season. He played 34 games in the 1989–90 campaign, scoring two goals, having lost his first-team place in January. He appeared 46 times in the 1990–91 season, scoring three goals, with all his starts coming in the number seven shirt.

He played 45 matches in the 1991–92 campaign, scoring three goals as a number seven. He played 48 games in the 1992–93 campaign, with Lincoln now in the Third Division due to the creation of the Premier League; he again wore the number seven shirt, aside from a period in mid-season where he was restricted to appearances from the substitute bench. He played 50 games in the 1993–94 season, scoring two goals, and was both club captain and supporters' Player of the Season. He scored three goals in 16 matches at the start of the 1994–95 season. He was later voted as number 47 in Lincoln's list of 100 league legends.

=== Later career ===
On 18 November 1994, Schofield joined Sammy Chung's Doncaster Rovers. He featured 27 times as a number eight in the 1994–95 season, before scoring four goals in 46 matches playing as a number seven in the 1995–96 campaign. He scored seven goals in 46 games in the 1996–97 season, again wearing the number seven shirt. Schofield signed with Mansfield Town for a £10,000 fee on 8 August 1997. He featured 50 times in the 1997–98 campaign and 48 times in the 1998–99 season, wearing the number seven shirt throughout his time at Field Mill.

He joined Hull City on a free transfer on 28 July 1999. He played 35 games in the 1999–2000 season, beginning the campaign in the starting eleven before being reduced to the role of substitute in the new year. He had been signed to provide cover for player-manager Warren Joyce, but fell out with Joyce and found himself out of the team in favour of emerging talent Adam Bolder; he was identified as surplus to requirements by new manager Brian Little in April.

Schofield returned to Lincoln City on 6 June 2000 to take up the post of Head of Youth Development. With Lincoln beginning to struggle financially, Schofield was also called upon as a player, making a further 24 appearances in the 2000–01 campaign, before he finally wound his playing career down.

== Coaching and managerial career ==
=== Lincoln City ===
Schofield, a UEFA Pro Licence holder, made impressive progress with Lincoln's youth team set-up. Several promising players, such as Lee Frecklington, either making the first-team squad or being sold to higher-level clubs such as Jack Hobbs who was sold to Liverpool and Scott Loach who moved on to Watford. His good work was rewarded with an increasing role with the first-team and he was appointed first-team coach before the start of the 2005–06 season. He signed a new two-year deal with the club in April 2006. The departure of Keith Alexander as Lincoln's manager on 24 May 2006 saw Schofield take over as caretaker manager. He was appointed as Lincoln's head coach on 15 June 2006, with John Deehan appointed as director of football.

The 2006–07 season started promisingly for Lincoln with a new-found commitment to attacking passing football, which saw them top the table in October 2006 and be amongst the leading scorers in the league. He was named as League Two Manager of the Month for October after winning all four games that month. However, Lincoln's form fell away in 2007 and rather than pushing for automatic promotion they were, for the fifth season running, forced to settle for a place in the play-offs. In the semi-final Lincoln were beaten 7–4 on aggregate by Bristol Rovers. His was contract extended to three years on 6 August 2007, and his title was changed from head coach to manager.

The poor form exhibited by Lincoln in the second half of the 2006–07 season continued into 2007–08, and this was met with increasing unease by the Lincoln supporters with a feeling that Schofield has neglected the defence of the squad in favour of his attacking strategy. Schofield was sacked by Lincoln on 15 October 2007 after nine matches without a win.

=== Backroom staff roles ===
Schofield began coaching at Scunthorpe United in February 2008, where he helped carried out extra training sessions for players not involved in the first-team, before he departed at the end of the 2007–08 season. On 17 June 2008, he was appointed first-team coach at Walsall, to work under manager Jimmy Mullen. Schofield was appointed manager on a caretaker basis after Mullen was sacked on 10 January 2009. He took charge for just one match, a 1–0 defeat away to Peterborough United, but left the club ten days later ahead of the appointment of manager Chris Hutchings, who brought in his own right-hand man in former Walsall player Martin O'Connor.

On 20 March 2009, Cheltenham Town's manager Martin Allen appointed Schofield as his assistant on an initial expenses-only basis. The appointment was made full-time on 14 May, when Schofield agreed a two-year contract. On 20 October, he became caretaker manager of the club after Allen was placed on gardening leave whilst an alleged incident involving Allen at a nightclub was investigated. Although Allen was subsequently cleared by an internal club investigation, on 11 December he left the club by mutual consent with Schofield remaining in temporary charge. Although he was interviewed for the permanent manager's role, his erstwhile Lincoln teammate Mark Yates was appointed with Schofield reverting to his role as assistant manager. His spell as caretaker manager had consisted of nine matches with just a single victory: a 5–1 defeat of Barnet. A restructuring of the backroom team at the end of the 2009–10 season saw Schofield depart Whaddon Road after 15 months at the club.

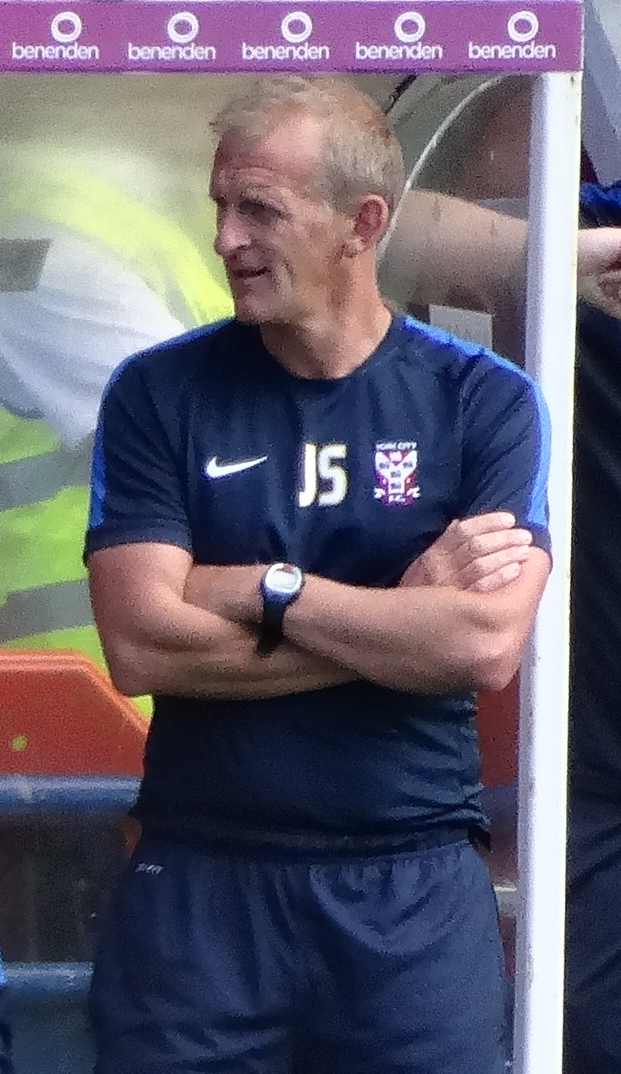
Schofield as assistant manager of York City in 2015

On 6 July 2010, he joined Cambridge United on a trial basis to assist manager Martin Ling with the club's pre-season preparations. Having impressed, he joined the club on a two-year contract to become first-team coach. Following a run of four successive defeats, he and Ling were sacked by Cambridge on 1 February 2011. On 11 April 2011, Notts County appointed Martin Allen as manager on a one-year rolling contract and he quickly appointed Schofield as first-team coach. Although Allen steered the club clear of relegation at the end of the 2010–11 season, he was sacked on 18 February 2012 with the club occupying 11th-place in League One. Two days later, following the appointment of Keith Curle as manager, Schofield also departed Meadow Lane. In July 2012, he linked up with Martin Allen for a third time, when he became his assistant at Gillingham. Although Allen led the club to the League Two title in 2012–13, after winning just two of their first eleven league games in 2013–14, he was sacked on 13 October 2013. Schofield was placed in caretaker charge, before Peter Taylor was appointed interim manager a day later. He remained part of the backroom staff under Taylor, before leaving his role on 6 May 2014.

On 23 June 2014, Schofield was appointed assistant manager at Scunthorpe United. He had played with the club's manager Russ Wilcox at Doncaster whilst the two also completed their coaching badges and pro-licence on the same courses. On 8 October, Schofield and Wilcox were sacked by Scunthorpe after the team started the 2014–15 season with two wins from eleven matches. On 30 December 2014, he returned to Lincoln City in a voluntary coaching capacity to assistant recently appointed manager Chris Moyses, before resuming his relationship with Wilcox through being appointed his assistant at League Two club York City on 21 May 2015. With York 21st in the table after a nine-match run without a win early in the 2015–16 season, Wilcox and Schofield were sacked on 26 October. On 7 September 2016, Schofield returned to former club Doncaster Rovers as a Senior Professional Development Coach, working with youth players and younger first-team players to bridge the gap between the squads. He trained the first-team in the summer of 2019, before Darren Moore was appointed to the vacant manager role. He later coached at Peterborough United's youth team.

=== Northern Ireland U21 ===
On 26 July 2021, Schofield became the new manager of Northern Ireland under-21 team. He stepped down from the role on 1 February 2023 after Northern Ireland finished third in their group for 2023 UEFA European Under-21 Championship qualification, having won two and drawn one of his ten games in charge.

=== Return to coaching ===
On 18 April 2023, Schofield joined the backroom staff at Port Vale to assist interim manager Andy Crosby – his predecessor as Northern Ireland U21 manager – in steering the club away from the League One relegation zone. Having achieved this aim, he was confirmed as Crosby's assistant manager in June 2023. He left the club when Crosby was sacked on 5 February 2024. He was named as Scunthorpe United's new assistant manager in July 2024, this time serving under Andy Butler.

== Career statistics ==
=== Playing ===
Appearances and goals by club, season and competition
Club	Season	League			FA Cup		Other (Note: Includes League Cup and Football League Trophy)		Total	
Club	Season	Division	Apps	Goals	Apps	Goals	Apps	Goals	Apps	Goals
Huddersfield Town	1983–84	Second Division	0	0	0	0	0	0	0	0
Lincoln City	1988–89	Fourth Division	29	2	0	0	2	0	31	2
Lincoln City	1989–90	Fourth Division	29	2	2	0	3	0	34	2
Lincoln City	1990–91	Fourth Division	42	3	1	0	3	0	46	3
Lincoln City	1991–92	Fourth Division	39	1	1	0	5	2	45	3
Lincoln City	1992–93	Third Division	40	0	2	0	6	0	48	0
Lincoln City	1993–94	Third Division	40	2	2	0	8	0	50	2
Lincoln City	1994–95	Third Division	12	1	0	0	5	2	16	3
Lincoln City	Total		231	11	8	0	32	4	271	15
Doncaster Rovers	1994–95	Third Division	27	1	0	0	0	0	27	1
Doncaster Rovers	1995–96	Third Division	41	4	1	0	4	0	46	4
Doncaster Rovers	1996–97	Third Division	42	7	1	0	3	0	46	7
Doncaster Rovers	Total		110	12	2	0	7	0	119	12
Mansfield Town	1997–98	Third Division	44	0	2	0	4	0	50	0
Mansfield Town	1998–99	Third Division	42	0	2	0	4	0	48	0
Mansfield Town	Total		86	0	4	0	8	0	98	0
Hull City	1999–2000	Third Division	25	0	4	0	6	0	35	0
Lincoln City	2000–01	Third Division	19	0	1	0	4	1	24	1
Career total (Note: Non-League statistics not recorded)			471	23	19	0	57	5	547	28

=== Managerial ===
As of 1 February 2023

Managerial record by team and tenure
Team	From	To	Record					Ref
Team	From	To	P	W	D	L	Win %	Ref
Lincoln City	24 May 2006	15 October 2007	64	23	14	27	35.9	
Walsall (caretaker)	10 January 2009	20 January 2009	1	0	0	1	0.0	
Cheltenham Town (caretaker)	20 October 2009	22 December 2009	9	1	3	5	11.1	
Gillingham (caretaker)	13 October 2013	14 October 2013	0	0	0	0	—	
Northern Ireland U21	26 July 2021	1 February 2023	10	2	1	7	20.0	
Total			84	26	18	40	31.0	

== Honours ==
Player

Individual

- Lincoln City Player of the Season: 1993–94

Manager

Individual

- League Two Manager of the Month: October 2006
