= Jonathan Milner =

English footballer

Personal information
- Full name: Jonathan Robert Milner
- Date of birth: 30 March 1981 (age 45)
- Place of birth: Mansfield, England
- Position: Forward

Senior career*
Years	Team	Apps	(Gls)
1997–1998	Mansfield Town	7	(0)
1998	Rainworth Miners Welfare		
Total		7	(0)
- * Club domestic league appearances and goals

Jonathan Robert Milner (born 30 March 1981) is an English former professional footballer who played in the Football League for Mansfield Town.
