= Mark Clifford (footballer) =

English footballer

Personal information
- Full name: Mark Robert Clifford
- Date of birth: 11 November 1977 (age 48)
- Place of birth: Nottingham, England
- Position: Defender

Senior career*
Years	Team	Apps	(Gls)
1994–1997	Mansfield Town	4	(0)
1997–1998	Ilkeston Town		
1998–1999	Stamford		
1999–2002	Ilkeston Town		
2002–2003	Boston United	59	(0)
2002	→ Chester City		
2002	→ Ilkeston Town		
2002–2004	Nuneaton Borough		
2004	Ilkeston Town		
Total		63	(0)
- * Club domestic league appearances and goals

Mark Robert Clifford (born 11 September 1977) is an English former professional footballer who played in the Nationwide Conference and Football League for Boston United and Mansfield Town.

Clifford is the owner of Ilkeston Town, of the Northern Premier League Premier Division having previously also been manager.
