= Cyrille L'Helgoualch =

French footballer (born 1970)

Personal information
- Full name: Cyrille L'Helgoualch
- Date of birth: 25 September 1970 (age 56)
- Place of birth: St Nazaire, France
- Position: Defender

Senior career*
Years	Team	Apps	(Gls)
1989–1990	Le Mans	0	(0)
1990–1995	Stade Rennais	107	(3)
1995–1996	Châteauroux	4	(0)
1996–1997	Saint-Denis Saint-Leu	0	(0)
1997–1998	Angers	3	(0)
1998	SSV Ulm	0	(0)
1998	Walsall	0	(0)
1999	Mansfield Town	4	(1)
Total		118	(4)
- * Club domestic league appearances and goals

Cyrille L'Helgoualch (born 25 September 1970) is a French former professional footballer who played in the Football League for Mansfield Town.
