= Stuart Ryder =

English footballer

Personal information
- Date of birth: 6 November 1973 (age 52)
- Place of birth: Sutton Coldfield, England
- Position: Defender

Youth career
- Walsall

Senior career*
Years	Team	Apps	(Gls)
1992–1998	Walsall	101	(5)
1998–1999	Mansfield Town	22	(2)
- Nuneaton Borough

International career
- England U21
- * Club domestic league appearances and goals

Stuart Ryder (born 6 November 1973) is an English former professional footballer who played for Walsall, Mansfield Town and Nuneaton Borough.

Stuart was considered to have excellent potential, being selected for England U21s in the Toulon tournament but suffered a serious knee injury and was eventually forced to retire early.

== Honours ==
with Walsall

- Football League Fourth Division runner-up: 1994–95
