= Matt Carruthers =

English footballer

Personal information
- Full name: Matthew Carruthers
- Date of birth: 22 July 1976 (age 50)
- Place of birth: Dover, England
- Position: Forward

Senior career*
| Years | Team | Apps | (Gls) |
| 1994–1995 | Dover Athletic | | |
| 1995–1997 | Ashford Town | 60 | (20) |
| 1997–1998 | Newport (IOW) | | |
| 1998 | Dover Athletic | | |
| 1998–1999 | Mansfield Town | 5 | (0) |
| 1999 | Dover Athletic | | |
| 1999 | Folkestone Invicta | | |
| 2000–2005 | Dover Athletic | | |
| 2005 | Welling United | | |
| 2006–2007 | Ashford Town (Kent) | 16 | (0) |
- * Club domestic league appearances and goals

Matthew Carruthers (born 22 July 1976) is an English former professional footballer who played in the Football League for Mansfield Town.
