= Scott Eustace =

English footballer

Personal information
- Full name: Scott Eustace
- Date of birth: 13 June 1975 (age 51)
- Place of birth: Leicester, England
- Position: Defender

Senior career*
Years	Team	Apps	(Gls)
1993–1995	Leicester City	1	(0)
1995–1998	Mansfield Town	98	(6)
1998	Chesterfield	0	(0)
1999–2000	Cambridge United	51	(1)
2000	Lincoln City	1	(0)
2001–2002	Hinckley United		
2002–2003	Stevenage		
2003	Telford United		
- * Club domestic league appearances and goals

Scott Eustace (born 13 June 1975) is an English former footballer who played in The Football League for Leicester City, Mansfield Town, Cambridge United and Lincoln City.
