= Simon Wood (footballer) =

English footballer (born 1976)

Personal information
- Full name: Simon Onward Wood
- Date of birth: 24 September 1976 (age 50)
- Place of birth: Kingston upon Hull, England
- Position: Forward

Senior career*
Years	Team	Apps	(Gls)
1993–1995	Coventry City	0	(0)
1994–1995	→ VS Rugby (loan)		
1995–1997	Mansfield Town	41	(4)
1997	Guiseley		
Total		41	(4)
- * Club domestic league appearances and goals

Simon Onward Wood (born 24 September 1976) is an English former professional footballer who played in the Football League for Mansfield Town.
