= Jason Sedlan =

English footballer

Personal information
- Full name: Jason Mark Sedlan
- Date of birth: 5 August 1979 (age 47)
- Place of birth: Peterborough, England
- Position: Midfielder

Senior career*
Years	Team	Apps	(Gls)
1997–1999	Mansfield Town	6	(0)
1999	Wisbech Town		
2000	Boston United		
Total		6	(0)
- * Club domestic league appearances and goals

Jason Mark Sedlan (born 5 August 1979) is an English former professional footballer who played in the Football League for Mansfield Town.
