= David Kerr (footballer) =

Scottish footballer

Personal information
- Full name: David William Kerr
- Date of birth: 6 September 1974 (age 52)
- Place of birth: Dumfries, Scotland
- Height: 1.80 m (5 ft 11 in)
- Position: Midfielder

Senior career*
Years	Team	Apps	(Gls)
1991–1996	Manchester City	6	(0)
1995	→ Mansfield Town (loan)	5	(0)
1996–2000	Mansfield Town	79	(4)
2000–2001	Chester City	20	(0)
2001–2002	Droylsden		
- * Club domestic league appearances and goals

David Kerr (born 6 September 1974) is a Scottish former professional association footballer who played as a midfielder.

He played in the Premier League for Manchester City between 1991 and 1996, making six league appearances. He went on to play in the Football League for Mansfield Town and Chester City, before retiring at non-league Droylsden in 2002.

== Playing career ==
Kerr joined Manchester City as a trainee from his local youth team Maxweltown Thistle in his home town of Dumfries. At Manchester City he played in the youth team that won the Lancashire F.A professional youth cup in May 1992. He went on to be a regular in the reserve team which he also captained on many occasions. He progressed to make his debut in May 1993 against Crystal Palace and was then an unused substitute on the final game of the season against Everton. He went on to play against Everton two more times as well as Arsenal, Tottenham and West ham and was an unused substitute against Nottingham Forest in the 4th round of the League Cup. During his time at Maine Road he made six first team appearances and was an unused substitute twice.

Kerr joined Mansfield Town on loan in September 1995 playing six games including five league fixtures. Kerr transferred between the two clubs in close season of 1996 for a fee of £20,000. In his first year at Mansfield he sustained a double fracture and dislocation of his right ankle whilst playing against Carlisle and this kept him out of the game for over 12 months. He was at Mansfield for four seasons in which he made a total of 87 first team appearances. He scored four goals, all in league matches.

In the 2000 close season Kerr transferred to Chester City. He was there until December 2001 during which time he made 21 senior appearances.

He then moved into non league football with Droylsden before retiring in 2003.

David no longer plays football due to injuries picked up in his career, so spends his time playing golf, although this gives back pain as a result of carrying his golfing partner.
