= Johnny Walker (footballer, born 1973) =

Scottish footballer

Personal information
- Full name: John Walker
- Date of birth: 12 December 1973 (age 52)
- Place of birth: Glasgow, Scotland
- Height: 5 ft 9 in (1.75 m)
- Position: Midfielder

Youth career
- 1989–1990: Clydebank Boys Club
- 1990–1993: Rangers

Senior career*
Years	Team	Apps	(Gls)
1993–1995	Clydebank	27	(2)
1995–1996	Grimsby Town	3	(1)
1996	→ Mansfield Town (loan)	13	(1)
1996–1999	Mansfield Town	60	(4)
1999	→ Boston United (loan)	0	(0)
2000	Greenock Morton	5	(0)
2000–2001	Clydebank	26	(1)
2001–2004	Hamilton Academical	17	(0)
- * Club domestic league appearances and goals

John Walker (born 12 December 1973) is a Scottish former professional footballer, who played as a midfielder. He notably played for Clydebank and Mansfield Town in a career that lasted between 1990 and 2004.

Walker started his professional career with Rangers but in three years at Ibrox he only managed three first team appearances. In 1993, he transferred to Clydebank. He then made a move to England in 1995, signing with Grimsby Town. He was brought Blundell Park by Brian Laws as the club's highest paid player; after three years he then joined Mansfield Town following a loan spell at the club.

After spending time on trial with Scarborough and Kingstonian, he returned to Scotland in March 2000 to play out his career for Greenock Morton, Clydebank and Hamilton Academical. While playing for Hamilton in March 2003, he failed a random drugs test and was subsequently banned from football for three months.
