= Ben Sedgemore =

English footballer

Personal information
- Full name: Benjamin Redwood Sedgemore
- Date of birth: 5 August 1975 (age 51)
- Place of birth: Wolverhampton, England
- Height: 6 ft 0 in (1.83 m)
- Position: Midfielder

Youth career
- 1991–1993: Birmingham City

Senior career*
Years	Team	Apps	(Gls)
1993–1996	Birmingham City	0	(0)
1994	→ Northampton Town (loan)	1	(0)
1995–1996	Mansfield Town	9	(0)
1996	Peterborough United	17	(0)
1996–1998	Mansfield Town	62	(6)
1998–2001	Macclesfield Town	100	(6)
2001–2004	Lincoln City	108	(5)
2004–2006	Canvey Island	72	(4)
2006–2007	Cambridge United	4	(1)
2006–2007	Rushden & Diamonds	1	(0)
2006–2007	Havant & Waterlooville	23	(0)
2007–2008	Chelmsford City	?	(?)
2007–2009	King's Lynn	12	(0)
2009	Boston United		
2009–2011	Stamford		
- * Club domestic league appearances and goals

Benjamin Redwood Sedgemore (born 5 August 1975) is an English former professional footballer who played as a midfielder.

He played professionally for Northampton Town, Mansfield Town, Peterborough United, Mansfield Town, Macclesfield Town, Lincoln City, Cambridge United and Rushden & Diamonds. He played at non-league level for Canvey Island, Havant & Waterlooville, Chelmsford City, King's Lynn, Boston United and Stamford.

== Career ==
He previously played for Northampton Town, Mansfield Town, Peterborough United, Mansfield Town, Macclesfield Town, Lincoln City, Canvey Island and Cambridge United, and signed for Rushden & Diamonds in November 2006.

In January 2006 he joined Conference South side Havant & Waterlooville initially on loan as cover for Ian Baird's injury-hit side, making his debut in the 2–1 away defeat to Basingstoke Town on 13 January 2007. He remained with the Hawks until the end of the season, making 20 starts and three substitute appearances in their Football Conference South campaign. In the summer of 2007 he linked up with his ex-Canvey Island manager Jeff King at Chelmsford City but departed in October. In December 2007, he linked up with King's Lynn and helped them to win promotion.

In January 2009, Sedgemore was released by King's Lynn. His next port of call was a brief three-month stay with Boston United before signing for Stamford. He retired at the end of the 2010–11 season.

== Personal life ==
By the time Sedgemore had retired from professional football, he had secured a BSc in Psychology and Law and a Masters from Loughborough University in Fiancé, Marketing And Management (as well as a host of coaching qualifications). He later moved into event management – becoming CEO of a global event management company for 7 years. After 11 years in events, he moved to MM Flowers as Head of Commercial. His arrival coincided with significant growth for the company, as they assumed the status as the largest supplier of cut flowers in the UK Market within his first four years at the Company.
