= 2025–26 Burnley F.C. season =

English football club season

Burnley F.C.
2025–26 season
- Owner: ALK Capital LLC
- Chairman: Alan Pace
- Head coach: Scott Parker (until 30 April); Mike Jackson (interim, from 30 April)
- Stadium: Turf Moor
- Premier League: 19th (relegated)
- FA Cup: Fourth round
- EFL Cup: Third round
- Top goalscorer: League: Zian Flemming (11); All: Zian Flemming (12)
- Highest home attendance: 21,678 (v. Liverpool, Premier League, 14 September 2025)
- Lowest home attendance: 6,010 (v. Cardiff City, EFL Cup, 23 September 2025)
- Average home league attendance: 21,005
- Biggest win: 5–1 v. Millwall (H); FA Cup, 10 January 2026
- Biggest defeat: 1–5 v. Manchester City (A); Premier League, 27 September 2025
Home colours	Away colours	Third colours

The 2025–26 season was the 144th season in the history of Burnley Football Club, and the club's first season back in the Premier League since the 2023–24 campaign, following promotion from the Championship in the preceding season. In addition to the domestic league, the club also participated in the FA Cup and the EFL Cup.

On 22 April 2026, Burnley were relegated from the Premier League following a 1–0 home defeat to Manchester City, becoming the fourth team to suffer relegation from the competition at least five times after Norwich City, West Bromwich Albion and Leicester City.

== Review ==
=== Pre-season ===
On 26 June 2025, Burnley confirmed that first-team set-piece coach, Elliot Tybebo, had departed the club to pursue a new opportunity abroad, ending a two-year stay at the club. He was initially brought to the club from Belgian side Anderlecht in 2023 along with manager Vincent Kompany. On 24 July, Burnley appointed a new set-piece coach, Pål Fjelde, to replace Elliot Tybebo who departed in the previous month. The 30 year-old Norwegian had most recently been involved in roles as an assistant manager at Danish club, Viborg FF, and as a set-piece coach for the Norwegian Football Federation.

On 27 June, Ashley Barnes agreed a new one-year deal having re-joined the club on a short-term deal in January 2025 until the end of the season. The 35 year-old forward, who had over 300 appearances for the club, stated that he "had unfinished business" and wanted to play for one final campaign in the Premier League.

On 30 June, current Academy coach, Jack Cork, was moved up to be a member of Scott Parker's coaching team. The former midfielder had only joined the previous summer to be a part of Andy Farrell's Academy team, in what was his first season of coaching.

==== First-team transfers (summer transfer window) ====
The Premier League summer transfer window runs from 1 June to 10 June (due to an exceptional registration period mandated by FIFA for the Club World Cup), and then between 16 June and 1 September 2025.

On 11 June, it was announced that the representatives of CJ Egan-Riley had formally rejected a significant long-term contract offer from the club and that he was to pursue a new opportunity in France, later joining Ligue 1 runners-up Olympique de Marseille on a free-transfer. The England U21 international was an integral part of the defence that kept a record-equalling 30 clean sheets in 2024–25, making 43 league appearances alongside Maxime Estève.

Burnley made their first signing of the summer on 25 June, with the Germany under-20 international goalkeeper Max Weiß joining from German club Karlsruher SC for a reported fee of £4.3m. The 21 year-old had been an ever-present in his breakthrough season for the club, helping them to an 8th-place finish in 2. Bundesliga. Burnley sold the Republic of Ireland under-21 international Dara Costelloe to League One side Wigan Athletic on the same day for a reported fee of £0.5m. The forward had initially joined the academy in 2021 and had eventually progressed to the first team to make six appearances, but had spent the last two-and-a-half seasons out on loan.

The club's second and third signings were revealed on 26 June: left-back and Dutch international Quilindschy Hartman from Dutch Eredivisie side Feyenoord for an initial fee of £7.7m and centre-back and DR Congo international Axel Tuanzebe on a free transfer, following his release from recently relegated Premier League side, Ipswich Town. Upon expiry of their contracts on 30 June, Josh Brownhill, Nathan Redmond and Jonjo Shelvey left the club. On 2 July, Burnley signed French forward Loum Tchaouna from Lazio. Three days later, defender Kyle Walker was signed from Manchester City, where he had won 17 trophies.

Burnley's first loan departure was announced on 8 July when forward Andréas Hountondji departed to Bundesliga side FC St. Pauli on a season-long deal. The Benin international had joined the Clarets the previous summer but had struggled to breakthrough into the first team, spending the second half of the previous campaign on loan at Standard Liège.

Burnley signed 26 year-old Danish international Jacob Bruun Larsen for a second time on 11 June, having spent the 2023–24 Premier League campaign on loan at the club from TSG 1899 Hoffenheim. The winger transferred from Bundesliga side VfB Stuttgart for an undisclosed fee, believed to be £3.4m, having only joined the club in January 2025.

On 15 July, Han-Noah Massengo joined German Bundesliga side FC Augsburg for an undisclosed fee, believed to be in the region of £2.6m. The 24 year-old midfielder had struggled to make an impact since signing for the club in August 2023 and had spent the second half of the previous season on loan at AJ Auxerre. On 29 July, Burnley sold goalkeeper James Trafford to Manchester City for a club-record fee of £31m (plus add-ons and a sell-on clause), making him the most expensive British goalkeeper in history. Trafford was regarded as one of the club's key players, and broke several English records the previous season, including the most clean sheets (29 in 45 matches) in single season.

In three successive days, from 6 to 8 August, the club signed three new players: experienced goalkeeper and Slovakia international Martin Dúbravka from Newcastle United, and midfielder Lesley Ugochukwu and forward Armando Broja, both from Chelsea. The reported transfer fee for Ugochukwu—approximately £23m—set a new record for the highest fee Burnley have ever paid.

=== Pre-season friendlies ===
Burnley kicked off their pre-season campaign with a 1–0 win over EFL League Two side Fleetwood Town on 12 July in a friendly behind closed doors at the Burnley Training Centre. The game was won courtesy of a Marcus Edwards second-half goal but the game was notable as central defender, Jordan Beyer, returned to the side following a serious long-term injury that he sustained in December 2023. The club then departed for a week of warm-weather training in Portugal shortly after, which also included U21 prospects Charlie Casper, Murray Campbell and Joe Bauress.

On 14 July, Swiss forward Zeki Amdouni was dealt an injury blow just weeks into pre-season when he suffered a suspected cruciate ligament tear that would lead to a prolonged absence requiring surgery. The 24 year-old had not played for the club since May 2024 and had spent the previous season on loan at Portuguese side Benfica, who had chosen not to exercise a clause to make the move permanent.

The Clarets concluded their Portugal training camp on 19 July with a 1–1 draw against Premier League side Wolverhampton Wanderers when Jacob Bruun Larsen equalised in the second half in the Algarve to cancel out Jørgen Strand Larsen's opener.

They concluded their pre-season campaign with a game against Italian side Lazio at Turf Moor on 9 August 2025, which Burnley lost 1–0. During this match, Burnley became the first football club in history to live stream a game in immersive virtual reality. The broadcast, developed by club partner Rezzil, offered viewers a virtual seat inside the ground with a panoramic view of the pitch, live commentary, ambient crowd noise, and real-time visuals including club branding and player kits.

=== August ===
Burnley kicked off their Premier League campaign on 16 August away at the 2024–25 UEFA Europa League champions Tottenham Hotspur at the Tottenham Hotspur Stadium, a ground where Burnley had lost on every occasion. They started poorly with a 3–0 defeat with a brace from Richarlison, including an overhead kick, and one goal from Brennan Johnson which helped Spurs to a win in Thomas Frank's first Premier League game in charge of the club. Martin Dúbravka, on his debut, became the first Premier League goalkeeper to be penalised by the new eight-second ruling.

On 23 August, Burnley played their first home game of the campaign against fellow promoted side Sunderland, who had beaten Sheffield United in the play-offs and had started this campaign with an impressive 3–0 home win against West Ham United. Dúbravka made a smart early save to deny Eliezer Mayenda from close range before Lyle Foster had a goal ruled out by referee Michael Salisbury, indicating there was a foul in the build-up, which was confirmed by VAR. Just after half time in the 47th minute, Burnley scored their first goal of the season with captain Josh Cullen guiding the ball into the bottom right corner from the edge of the box following a clever flick from Jaidon Anthony. The game was temporarily delayed for over 3 1/2 minutes when there was an issue with the floodlights which subsequently led to them being turned off. Burnley secured the 3 points and a 2–0 win in the 88th minute when roles were reversed from the first goal, with Cullen playing a delightful through ball for Anthony to latch onto and round goalkeeper Robin Roefs, before smashing high into the net. It was the third Premier League season in succession that Burnley's first win had come against one of the promoted teams, with Brentford in 2021–22 and Luton Town in 2023–24.

Three days later Burnley kicked off their EFL Cup campaign in the second round against EFL Championship side Derby County, who had beaten West Bromwich Albion away on penalties in the first round. Burnley had received a bye in the first round due to being a Premier League side. It was the first time that Burnley had been awarded a home tie in a cup competition in the last ten draws, dating back to March 2023 against Fleetwood Town in the FA Cup. Burnley made eleven changes to the starting eleven, with not one of those who started in the win over Sunderland being included in the matchday squad, but still secured a 2–1 victory. Aaron Ramsey scored his first goal for the club in the 4th minute, slotting into the corner from just inside the box following a Armando Broja assist on his debut. Derby levelled the game in the 35th minute with a Bobby Clark shot which hit the post before going in. The game looked to be going to penalties but Oliver Sonne secured the win on 90+1 minutes with his first goal for the club, slipping the ball past the goalkeeper following a Mike Trésor assist, on his first game at Turf Moor since April 2024.

Burnley travelled to Manchester United for the second away game of the season who were sat in 16th place having failed to win their first two games. Burnley had a poor start to the first half and nearly found themselves behind just after the first quarter of an hour when referee Sam Barrott pointed to the spot for a foul on Mason Mount by Kyle Walker. However the decision was reversed by the referee after review following an intervention from VAR. Midway through the first half Manchester United did take the lead when the ball hit Josh Cullen and rebounded in following a free kick that hit the crossbar. United again hit the crossbar through Mount but Burnley went in at half time 1–0 down. Ten minutes into the second half, Burnley equalised through an unmarked Lyle Foster in the box following a cross from the right hand side from Jacob Bruun Larsen. Almost immediately United retook the lead when they attacked down the left and crossed for Bryan Mbeumo to hit home his first league goal for the club. Just moments later Burnley though they had equalised again when Foster raced through on goal, rounded Altay Bayındır and slotted home, but the flag went up for offside. Burnley did get the equaliser in the 66th minute when Walker caused problems in the box with a long throw and Jaidon Anthony's shot went in via a combination of the goalkeeper and defender. Just when it appeared that Burnley would come away with a point a penalty was awarded retrospectively via VAR for a shirt pull by Anthony on Amad Diallo. Bruno Fernandes converted the spot kick on 90+5 minutes to make it 3–2 and seal the points for Manchester United.

=== September ===
Following the international break, Burnley had a home game against current Premier League champions Liverpool, who had started the campaign with three consecutive wins and sat at the top of the table. Liverpool left out their new £125m British transfer record-signing Alexander Isak, who wasn't included in the matchday squad by manager Arne Slot. Burnley defended resolutely for the majority of the game going in at the break at 0–0 having restricted Liverpool to any major chances. The game turned in Liverpool's favour in the 84th minute when Burnley were reduced to 10 men following a second yellow card for midfielder Lesley Ugochukwu, becoming only the second Burnley player to be sent off at Turf Moor in 173 Premier League home games. In stoppage time, Liverpool were given a chance to win the game when referee Michael Oliver pointed to the spot for a handball committed by substitute Hannibal Mejbri following a cross from Jeremie Frimpong. Mohamed Salah stepped up to hammer the ball home for a 1–0 win to Liverpool.

Burnley secured their first point in three games next time out with a 1–1 draw at home to Nottingham Forest, with Forest manager, Ange Postecoglou, picking up his first point as manager. Forest took an early lead in the 2nd minute when Neco Williams scored with a deflected shot following a corner. Burnley equalised just over quarter of an hour later when the ball fell to Jaidon Anthony who slotted home following a goalmouth scramble. Burnley nearly went into half time with a lead when Loum Tchaouna struck the underside of the crossbar following a direct free kick on the edge of the box. Forest looked the most likely to win the game in the second half with Martin Dúbravka making a series of saves, notably stopping a Igor Jesus header.

Three days later Burnley faced EFL League One Cardiff City in the third round of the EFL Cup at Turf Moor, with Cardiff beating EFL League Two sides Swindon Town and Cheltenham Town thus far. Burnley named a completely changed eleven again, as per the last cup game, with five Academy players on the bench, with Ellis Clark making his professional debut when coming on as a substitute. Cardiff scored two goals in five minutes in the first half through Joel Colwill and Callum Robinson to go into the break at 2–0. Zian Flemming pulled a goal back just after half time with a shot from outside the area following a goalkeeping mistake from Nathan Trott, but Burnley couldn't rescue a point in front of a very sparse crowd of 6,010, which was subsequently the lowest of the season.

== First team ==
=== First-team coaching staff ===
Note: Age as of 17 November 2026.

Position	Name	Nationality	Date of birth (age)	Appointed on	Last club/team	Ref.
Head coach	Scott Parker	England	13 Oct 1980 (age 46)	5 Jul 2024	(Belgium) Club Brugge	
Assistant head coach - analyst	Jonathan Hill	England	21 Mar 1989 (age 37)	5 Jul 2024	(Belgium) Club Brugge	
First team assistant coach	Henrik Jensen	Denmark	11 Jan 1985 (age 41)	20 Jun 2024	(Sweden) Kalmar FF (as manager)	
First team coach	Mike Jackson	England	4 Dec 1973 (age 52)	8 Jul 2021	(England) Tranmere Rovers (as manager)	
First team coach	Jack Cork	England	25 Jun 1989 (age 37)	30 Jun 2025	(England) Burnley (as Academy coach)	
Set-Piece coach	Pål Fjelde	Norway	26 Jul 1994 (age 32)	24 Jul 2025	(Denmark) Viborg (as assistant coach)	

=== First-team squad ===
Notes:

- Squad numbers last updated on 30 July 2025. Age as of 17 November 2026.
- Flags indicate national team as defined under FIFA eligibility rules. Players may change their FIFA nationalities after the 2025–26 season, and may hold more than one non-FIFA nationality.
- Player^{*} – Player who joined Burnley permanently or on loan during the season.
- Player^{†} – Player who departed Burnley on loan during the season.
- Player^{^} – Player who was promoted from Burnley's U21s or U18s squad during the season.
- Player (HG) – Player who fulfils the Premier League's "Home Grown Player" criteria.

No.	Player	Nat.	Position(s) (Footed)	Date of birth (age)	Height	Date signed	Previous club	Transfer fee	Contract ends	Ref.
Goalkeepers
1	Martin Dúbravka^{*}	SVK	GK (R)	15 Jan 1989 (age 37)	1.90 m (6 ft 3 in)	7 Aug 2025	(England) Newcastle United	Undisclosed	2026	
13	Max Weiß^{*}	GER	GK (R)	15 Jun 2004 (age 22)	1.90 m (6 ft 3 in)	25 Jun 2025	(Germany) Karlsruher SC	£4.3m	2029	
32	Václav Hladký	CZE	GK (R)	14 Nov 1990 (age 36)	1.92 m (6 ft 4 in)	19 Jul 2024	(England) Ipswich Town	Free	2026	
Defenders
2	Kyle Walker^{*} (HG) (Note: Walker graduated from Sheffield United's academy.)	ENG	RB (R)	28 May 1990 (age 36)	1.83 m (6 ft 0 in)	5 Jul 2025	(England) Manchester City	Free (initial fee)	2027	
3	Quilindschy Hartman^{*}	NED	LB (L)	14 Nov 2001 (age 25)	1.83 m (6 ft 0 in)	26 Jun 2025	(Netherlands) Feyenoord	£7.7m (initial fee)	2029	
4	Joe Worrall (HG) (Note: Worrall graduated from Nottingham Forest's academy.)	ENG	CB (R)	10 Jan 1997 (age 29)	1.93 m (6 ft 4 in)	22 Jun 2024	(England) Nottingham Forest	£5.0m	2028	
5	Maxime Estève	FRA	CB (L)	26 May 2002 (age 24)	1.93 m (6 ft 4 in)	1 Feb 2024 (loan); 21 May 2024	(France) Montpellier	Undisclosed	2030	
6	Axel Tuanzebe^{*} (HG) (Note: Tuanzebe graduated from Manchester United's academy.)	COD	CB / RB (R)	14 Nov 1997 (age 29)	1.85 m (6 ft 1 in)	26 Jun 2025	(England) Ipswich Town	Free	2026	
12	Bashir Humphreys^{*} (HG) (Note: Humphreys graduated from Chelsea's academy.)	ENG	LB / RB / CB (L)	15 Mar 2003 (age 23)	1.87 m (6 ft 2 in)	21 Aug 2024 (loan); 1 Jul 2025	(England) Chelsea	£12.0m (initial fee)	2029	
14	Connor Roberts (HG) (Note: Roberts graduated from Swansea City's academy.)	WAL	RB (R)	23 Sep 1995 (age 31)	1.75 m (5 ft 9 in)	31 Aug 2021	(Wales) Swansea City	£2.5m	2027+1	
18	Hjalmar Ekdal	SWE	CB (R)	21 Oct 1998 (age 28)	1.88 m (6 ft 2 in)	21 Jan 2023	(Sweden) Djurgårdens	£2.5m	2027	
23	Lucas Pires	BRA	LB (L)	24 Mar 2001 (age 25)	1.75 m (5 ft 9 in)	16 Jul 2021	(Brazil) Santos	£2.1m	2028	
36	Jordan Beyer	GER	CB (R)	19 May 2000 (age 26)	1.87 m (6 ft 2 in)	1 Sep 2022 (loan); 10 May 2023	(Germany) Borussia Mönchengladbach	£13.0m	2027	
Midfielders
8	Lesley Ugochukwu^{*}	FRA	CM (R)	26 Mar 2004 (age 22)	1.90 m (6 ft 3 in)	6 Aug 2025	(England) Chelsea	£23m	2030	
16	Florentino Luís^{*}	POR	CM (R)	19 Aug 1999 (age 27)	1.84 m (6 ft 3 in)	1 Sep 2025	(Portugal) Benfica	£1.7m (loan fee)	2026 (end of loan)	
20	James Ward-Prowse^{*}	ENG	CM (R)	1 Nov 1994 (age 32)	1.77 m (5 ft 8 in)	28 Jan 2026	(England) West Ham United	Free	2026 (end of loan)	
24	Josh Cullen (captain) (HG) (Note: Cullen graduated from West Ham United's academy.)	IRL	DM / CM (R)	7 Apr 1996 (age 30)	1.75 m (5 ft 9 in)	12 Jul 2022	(Belgium) Anderlecht	£3.0m	2027+1	
28	Hannibal Mejbri (HG) (Note: Hannibal graduated from Manchester United's academy.)	TUN	AM / LW / RW (R)	21 Jan 2003 (age 23)	1.77 m (5 ft 10 in)	28 Aug 2024	(England) Manchester United	£5.4m (initial fee)	2028	
29	Josh Laurent (HG) (Note: Laurent graduated from Queens Park Rangers' academy.)	ENG	DM / CM / CB (R)	6 May 1995 (age 31)	1.88 m (6 ft 2 in)	30 Aug 2024	(England) Stoke City	£0.5m (initial fee)	2026+1	
31	Mike Trésor	BEL	RW / LW (R)	28 May 1999 (age 27)	1.72 m (5 ft 8 in)	1 Sep 2023 (loan); 21 May 2024	(Belgium) Genk	£15.4m	2028	
Forwards
7	Jacob Bruun Larsen^{*}	DEN	LW / RW / AM (R)	19 Sep 1998 (age 28)	1.83 m (6 ft 0 in)	11 Jul 2025	(Germany) VfB Stuttgart	£3.5m	2029	
9	Lyle Foster	RSA	ST / LW / RW (R)	3 Sep 2000 (age 26)	1.85 m (6 ft 1 in)	25 Jan 2023	(Belgium) Westerlo	£6.1m (initial fee)	2028	
10	Marcus Edwards^{*} (HG) (Note: Edwards graduated from Tottenham Hotspur's academy.)	ENG	RW (L)	3 Dec 1998 (age 27)	1.68 m (5 ft 6 in)	3 Feb 2025 (loan); 26 May 2025	(Portugal) Sporting CP	£0.8m (loan) £8.4m	2029	
11	Jaidon Anthony^{*} (HG) (Note: Anthony graduated from AFC Bournemouth's academy.)	ENG	LW / RW (R)	1 Dec 1999 (age 26)	1.83 m (6 ft 0 in)	29 Aug 2024 (loan); 23 May 2025	(England) AFC Bournemouth	£8.0m	2029	
17	Loum Tchaouna^{*}	FRA	RW (L)	8 Sep 2003 (age 23)	1.80 m (5 ft 11 in)	2 Jul 2025	(Italy) Lazio	£12.9m	2030	
19	Zian Flemming^{*}	NED	ST (R&L)	1 Aug 1998 (age 28)	1.85 m (6 ft 1 in)	30 Aug 2024 (loan); 29 May 2025	(England) Millwall	£7.0m	2029	
25	Zeki Amdouni	SUI	AM / ST (R&L)	4 Dec 2000 (age 25)	1.85 m (6 ft 1 in)	19 Jul 2023	(Switzerland) Basel	£15.1m	2028	
27	Armando Broja^{*} (HG) (Note: Broja graduated from Chelsea's academy.)	ALB	ST (R)	10 Sep 2001 (age 25)	1.91 m (6 ft 3 in)	8 Aug 2025	(England) Chelsea	£10m (initial fee)	2030	
35	Ashley Barnes (HG)	ENG	ST (R)	30 Oct 1989 (age 37)	1.86 m (6 ft 1 in)	2 Jan 2025	(England) Norwich City	Free	2026	
48	Enock Agyei	BEL	RW / LW (L)	13 Jan 2005 (age 21)	1.72 m (5 ft 8 in)	31 Jan 2023	(Belgium) Anderlecht	£0.3m	2027	
Out on loan
21	Aaron Ramsey^{†} (HG) (Note: Ramsey graduated from Aston Villa's academy.)	ENG	CM / RW / LW (R)	21 Jan 2003 (age 23)	1.81 m (5 ft 11 in)	22 Aug 2023	(England) Aston Villa	£14.0m (initial fee)	2028	
22	Oliver Sonne^{†}	PER	RB (R)	10 Nov 2000 (age 26)	1.84 m (6 ft 0 in)	1 Jan 2025	(Denmark) Silkeborg	£2.5m	2029	
30	Luca Koleosho^{†}	ITA	RW / LW (R)	15 Sep 2004 (age 22)	1.75 m (5 ft 9 in)	25 Jul 2023	(Spain) Espanyol	£2.6m (initial fee)	2029	
34	Jaydon Banel^{†}	NED	ST / AM (R)	19 Oct 2004 (age 22)	1.73 m (5 ft 8 in)	3 Feb 2025	(Netherlands) Ajax	£0.8m	2029	
37	Andréas Hountondji^{†}	BEN	ST / LW (R)	11 Jul 2002 (age 24)	1.90 m (6 ft 3 in)	17 Jul 2024	(France) Caen	£3.4m	2028	
43	Shurandy Sambo^{†}	CUW	RB (R)	19 Aug 2001 (age 25)	1.74 m (5 ft 9 in)	28 Jun 2024	(Netherlands) PSV Eindhoven	Free	2028	
—	Owen Dodgson^{†} (HG)	ENG	LB (L)	19 Mar 2003 (age 23)	1.78 m (5 ft 10 in)	19 Nov 2020	(England) Manchester United	Free	2027	

==== Squad number changes ====
Note: Squad numbers last updated on 21 August 2025.

No.	Current player	Previous player	Notes	Ref.
1	(Slovakia) Martin Dúbravka (new signing)	(England) James Trafford	Trafford departed the club (July 2025).	
2	(England) Kyle Walker (new signing)	(Peru) Oliver Sonne	Sonne took the number 22 shirt (July 2025).	
3	(Netherlands) Quilindschy Hartman (new signing)	(Netherlands) Shurandy Sambo	Sambo took the number 43 shirt (July 2025).	
6	(Democratic Republic of the Congo) Axel Tuanzebe (new signing)	(England) CJ Egan-Riley	Egan-Riley departed the club (June 2025).	
7	(Denmark) Jacob Bruun Larsen (new signing)	(Ecuador) Jeremy Sarmiento	Sarmiento departed the club (June 2025).	
8	(France) Lesley Ugochukwu (new signing)	(England) Josh Brownhill	Brownhill departed the club (June 2025).	
9	(South Africa) Lyle Foster (previously no.17)	(England) Jay Rodriguez	Rodriguez departed the club (January 2025).	
10	(England) Marcus Edwards (previously no.22)	(Angola) Manuel Benson	Benson took the number 27 shirt (July 2025).	
13	(Germany) Max Weiß (new signing)	(Wales) Wayne Hennessey	Hennessey departed the club (June 2022).	
16	(Portugal) Florentino Luís (new signing)	(Republic of Ireland) John Egan	Egan departed the club (February 2025).	
17	(France) Loum Tchaouna (new signing)	(South Africa) Lyle Foster	Foster took the number 9 shirt (June 2025).	
22	(Peru) Oliver Sonne (previously no.2)	(England) Marcus Edwards	Edwards took the number 10 shirt (June 2025).	
26	(Angola) Manuel Benson (previously no.27)	(England) Jonjo Shelvey	Shelvey departed the club (June 2025).	
27	(Angola) Manuel Benson (previously no.10)	(North Macedonia) Darko Churlinov	Churlinov is currently unassigned a squad no. (June 2025).	
27	(Albania) Armando Broja (new signing)	(Angola) Manuel Benson	Benson took the number 26 shirt (August 2025).	
43	(Curaçao) Shurandy Sambo (previously no.3)	(England) Will Hugill	Hugill departed the club (June 2025).	

== Board and management team ==
Burnley board
Position	Name	Ref.
Chairman	(United States) Alan Pace	
Director	(United States) Stuart Hunt	
Director	(United States) Mike Smith	
Director	(United States) Dave Checketts	
Director	(Spain) Antonio Dávila	

== Contracts and transfers ==
=== New contracts ===
The following Burnley players signed their first or new professional contracts with the club.

Date	No.	Pos.	Player	Contract type	Ref.
First team
27 June 2025	35	FW	(England) Ashley Barnes	Contract extension until 2026	
30 July 2025	5	DF	(France) Maxime Estève	Contract extension until 2030	
Academy
20 May 2025	40	GK	(England) Charlie Casper	Contract extension until 2026	
20 May 2025	55	MF	(England) Charlie Veevers	Contract extension until 2026	
20 May 2025		DF	(England) Joe Ashton	Contract extension until 2026	
20 May 2025		FW	(Scotland) Joe Bevan	Contract extension until 2026	
20 May 2025	49	MF	(England) Tommy McDermott	Contract extension until 2026	
20 May 2025		GK	(England) Felix Chester	First professional contract	
4 June 2025	54	DF	(Scotland) Oli Pimlott	First professional contract	
6 June 2025	52	DF	(Scotland) Murray Campbell	Contract extension until 2027	
16 July 2025		MF	(England) Zach Johnson	First professional contract	
17 July 2025		MF	(England) Adam McCoy	First professional contract	
9 October 2025		DF	(England) Noah Adekoya	First professional contract	
10 October 2025		FW	(England) Benji Wetshi	First professional contract	
23 December 2025		GK	(England) Connor Edwards	First professional contract	
5 February 2026	41	MF	(England) George Brierley	First professional contract; until 30 June 2028	

=== Released ===
The following players from Burnley's first team and under-21s squad were released by the club.

Note: Excludes players who joined Burnley on loan in the previous season and returned to their parent clubs this season.

Date	No.	Pos.	Player	Subsequent club	Join date	Notes	Ref.
First team
30 June 2025	26	MF	(England) Jonjo Shelvey	(United Arab Emirates) Arabian Falcons (UAE Second Division League)	27 September 2025	End of contract	
30 June 2025	15	FW	(England) Nathan Redmond	(England) Sheffield Wednesday (Championship)	28 November 2025	End of contract	
30 June 2025	8	MF	(England) Josh Brownhill	(Saudi Arabia) Al Shabab (Saudi Pro League)	11 September 2025	End of contract	
30 June 2025	6	DF	(England) CJ Egan-Riley	(France) Marseille (Ligue 1)	1 July 2025	End of contract	
Academy
30 June 2025		DF	(Republic of Ireland) Alex Healy-Byrne	(England) AFC Fylde (National League North)	1 August 2025	End of contract	
30 June 2025	43	MF	(England) Will Hugill	(England) FC Halifax Town (National League)	1 July 2025	End of contract	
30 June 2025		GK	(Spain) Jon Ander Vilar Robinson	(Spain) Sestao (Segunda Federación – Group 2)	20 July 2025	End of contract	
30 June 2025		MF	(Republic of Ireland) Brandon Ly	(Vietnam) Công An Hà Nội (V.League 1)	23 July 2025	End of contract	
30 June 2025		MF	(Equatorial Guinea) Basilio Rieno	(Spain) Langreo (Segunda Federación - Group 1)	13 August 2025	End of contract	
30 June 2025		FW	(England) Lewis Richardson	(England) Boreham Wood (National League)	1 September 2025	End of contract	
30 June 2025		MF	(Brazil) João Mendes	(England) Hull City (Championship)	11 September 2025	End of contract	
30 June 2025		FW	(Republic of Ireland) Ryan Tioffo	(England) Warrington Rylands (NPL Premier Division)	30 August 2025	End of contract	
6 January 2026		DF	(England) Bradley Grant	(England) Spalding United (Southern Football League Premier Division Central)	28 March 2026	End of contract	

=== Transfers in ===
The following players joined Burnley permanently and signed professional contracts with the club.

Date	No.	Pos.	Player	Transferred from	Transfer fee	Contract ends	Ref.
First team
1 Jun 2025 (Note: The transfers were announced on 20 May and would become official on 1 June once the transfer window reopened)	11	FW	(England) Jaidon Anthony	(England) AFC Bournemouth (Premier League)	£8.0m	2029	
1 Jun 2025	10	FW	(England) Marcus Edwards	(Portugal) Sporting CP (Primeira Liga)	£8.4m	2029	
1 Jun 2025	19	FW	(Netherlands) Zian Flemming	(England) Millwall (Championship)	£7.0m	2029	
1 Jun 2025	12	DF	(England) Bashir Humphreys	(England) Chelsea (Premier League)	£12.0m + £2.7m	2029	
25 Jun 2025	13	GK	(Germany) Max Weiß	(Germany) Karlsruher SC (2. Bundesliga)	£4.3m	2029	
26 Jun 2025	3	DF	(Netherlands) Quilindschy Hartman	(Netherlands) Feyenoord (Eredivisie)	£7.7m + £2.6m	2029	
26 Jun 2025	6	DF	(Democratic Republic of the Congo) Axel Tuanzebe	(England) Ipswich Town (Championship)	Free (Note: The transfer was announced on 26 June and would become official on 1 July, following the expiration of his contract with Ipswich Town.)	2026	
2 Jul 2025	17	FW	(France) Loum Tchaouna	(Italy) Lazio (Serie A)	£12.9m	2030	
5 Jul 2025	2	DF	(England) Kyle Walker	(England) Manchester City (Premier League)	£0.0m + £5.0m	2027	
11 Jul 2025	7	FW	(Denmark) Jacob Bruun Larsen	(Germany) Stuttgart (Bundesliga)	£3.5m	2029	
6 Aug 2025	8	MF	(France) Lesley Ugochukwu	(England) Chelsea (Premier League)	£23.0m	2030	
7 Aug 2025	1	GK	(Slovakia) Martin Dúbravka	(England) Newcastle United (Premier League)	Undisclosed	2026	
8 Aug 2025	27	FW	(Albania) Armando Broja	(England) Chelsea (Premier League)	£10.0m + £5.0m	2030	
Academy
22 Aug 2025	47	MF	(Scotland) Ellis Clark	(Scotland) Aberdeen (Scottish Premiership)	Free	2026	
3 Sep 2025		GK	(Republic of Ireland) Oisin Cooney	(Republic of Ireland) Finn Harps (LOI First Division)	Free	2027+1	
19 Jan 2026		DF	(Scotland) Cameron Scott	(Scotland) Rangers (Scottish Premiership)	Compensation	2027	
6 Feb 2026		DF	(England) Roman Egan-Riley	(England) Tottenham Hotspur (Premier League)	Free	2026	

Total expenditure: ▼£96.8 million (excluding potential add-ons, bonuses and undisclosed figures)

=== Transfers out ===
Date	No.	Pos.	Player	Transferred to	Transfer fee	Ref.
First team
25 June 2025	46	FW	(Republic of Ireland) Dara Costelloe	(England) Wigan Athletic (League One)	£0.5m	
15 July 2025	42	MF	(France) Han-Noah Massengo	(Germany) Augsburg (Bundesliga)	£2.6m	
29 July 2025	1	GK	(England) James Trafford	(England) Manchester City (Premier League)	£31.0m	
27 August 2025	20	GK	(England) Etienne Green	(Denmark) Fredericia (Danish Superliga)	Free	
1 September 2025	—	FW	(North Macedonia) Darko Churlinov	(Turkey) Kocaelispor (Süper Lig)	Undisclosed	
3 January 2026	44	DF	(Haiti) Hannes Delcroix	(Switzerland) Lugano (Swiss Super League)	Undisclosed	
29 January 2026	26	FW	(Angola) Manuel Benson	(Israel) Maccabi Haifa (Israeli Premier League)	Free	
Academy
5 August 2025	47	FW	(England) Joe Westley	(Scotland) Dundee (Scottish Premiership)	Undisclosed	
1 September 2025	—	FW	(France) Julien Vetro	(France) Sochaux (Championnat National)	Undisclosed	
2 January 2026	—	FW	(Scotland) Joe Bevan	(Scotland) Dundee (Scottish Premiership)	Undisclosed	
8 January 2026	—	DF	(England) Noah Adekoya	(England) Liverpool (Premier League)	Undisclosed	
2 February 2026	50	GK	(England) Sam Waller	(England) Harrogate Town (League Two)	Undisclosed	

Total income: ▲£34.1m (excluding potential add-ons, bonuses and undisclosed figures)

=== Loans in ===
- Date^{‡} – Loan was originally scheduled to last to until end of the season but was curtailed.

Date	No.	Pos.	Player	Loaned from	On loan until	Loan fee	Ref.
1 September 2025	16	MF	(Portugal) Florentino Luís	(Portugal) Benfica (Primeira Liga)	End of season (Note: Option to make move permanent once loan deal concludes)	£1.7m (Note: Burnley retain the option to make the move permanent for £20.8m at the end of the loan.)	
28 January 2026	—	MF	(England) James Ward-Prowse	(England) West Ham United (Premier League)	End of season	Free	

Total expenditure: ▼£1.7 million (excluding potential add-ons, bonuses and undisclosed figures)

=== Loans out ===
- Date^{‡} – Loan was originally scheduled to last to until end of the season but was curtailed.

Date	No.	Pos.	Player	Loaned to	On loan until	Ref.
First team
8 July 2025	37	FW	(Benin) Andréas Hountondji	(Germany) St. Pauli (Bundesliga)	End of season	
31 July 2025	39	DF	(England) Owen Dodgson	(England) Stockport County (League One)	End of season (Note: Stockport have option to buy once the loan deal ends)	
15 August 2025	43	DF	(Curaçao) Shurandy Sambo	(Netherlands) Sparta Rotterdam (Eredivisie)	End of season	
21 August 2025	30	FW	(Italy) Luca Koleosho	(Spain) Espanyol (La Liga)	9 January 2026 (Note: On 9 January, Koleosho was recalled from his season-long loan at Espanyol and subsequently joined Paris on loan)	
1 September 2025	45	FW	(Republic of Ireland) Michael Obafemi	(Germany) Bochum (2. Bundesliga)	21 January 2026 (Note: On 21 January, Obafemi was recalled from his season-long loan at Bochum and subsequently joined Blackpool on loan)	
1 September 2025	21	FW	(England) Aaron Ramsey	(England) Leicester City (Championship)	End of season	
2 September 2025	26	FW	(Angola) Manuel Benson	(Wales) Swansea City (Championship)	29 January 2026 (Note: On 29 January, Benson was recalled from his initial season-long loan at Swansea and subsequently transferred to Maccabi Haifa)	
9 January 2026	30	FW	(Italy) Luca Koleosho	(France) Paris FC (Ligue 1)	End of season	
21 January 2026	45	FW	(Republic of Ireland) Michael Obafemi	(England) Blackpool (League One)	End of season	
29 January 2026	22	DF	(Peru) Oliver Sonne	(Czech Republic) Sparta Prague (Czech First League)	End of season	
Academy
11 July 2025	50	GK	(England) Sam Waller	(England) Crewe Alexandra (League Two)	12 January 2026 (Note: On 12 January, Waller's initial season-long loan at Crewe Alexandra was terminated)	
5 August 2025	41	MF	(England) Joe Bauress	(England) Accrington Stanley (League Two)	2 February 2026 (Note: On 2 February, Bauress and Pye were recalled from their season-long loan at Accrington Stanley)	
7 August 2025		DF	(England) Logan Pye	(England) Accrington Stanley (League Two)	2 February 2026	
11 August 2025	49	MF	(England) Tommy McDermott	(England) Shrewsbury Town (League Two)	End of season	
15 August 2025		MF	(Austria) Oluwaseun Adewumi	(Belgium) Cercle Brugge (Belgian Pro League)	End of season	
29 August 2025	51	FW	(England) Vernon Masara	(England) FC United of Manchester (NPL Premier Division)	26 September 2025	
1 September 2025	—	FW	(Scotland) Michael Mellon	(England) Oldham Athletic (League Two)	End of season	
1 September 2025	—	FW	(Wales) Tom Tweedy	(England) Morecambe (National League)	24 January 2026 (Note: On 24 January, Tweedy was recalled from his season-long loan at Morecambe and subsequently joined Darlington on loan)	
2 September 2025	—	GK	(England) Charlie Casper	(England) Grimsby Town (League Two)	5 January 2026 (Note: On 5 January, Casper was recalled from his season-long at Grimsby Town)	
1 December 2025	—	GK	(England) Lewis Forshaw	(England) Worksop Town (National League North)	1 February 2026	
19 January 2026	—	GK	(England) Felix Chester	(England) Burscough (North West Counties Premier Division)	Work Experience	
24 January 2026	—	FW	(Wales) Tom Tweedy	(England) Darlington (National League North)	End of season	
28 January 2026	—	GK	(England) Connor Edwards	(England) Prescot Cables (NPL Premier Division)	25 February 2026	
29 January 2026	—	DF	(England) Joe Ashton	(England) Marine (National League North)	26 February 2026	
29 January 2026	34	FW	(Netherlands) Jaydon Banel	(England) Derby County (Championship)	End of season	
7 February 2026	—	DF	(England) Anwar Murtesa	(England) Clitheroe (NPL Premier Division)	7 March 2026	
20 February 2026	—	GK	(Republic of Ireland) Oisin Cooney	(England) Prescot Cables (NPL Premier Division)		
28 February 2026	—	GK	(England) Charlie Casper	(England) Alfreton Town (National League North)	End of season	
27 March 2026	53	MF	(New Zealand) Marley Leuluai	(England) Marine (National League North)	End of season	
28 March 2026	—	GK	(England) Callum Feeney	(England) Lancaster City (Northern Premier League)	End of season	
6 April 2026	—	GK	(England) Harry Grimshaw	(England) Burscough (North West Counties Premier Division)	Work Experience	

=== Overall transfer activity ===
Note: All loan fees included. All potential add-ons, bonuses and undisclosed figures excluded.

Transfer window	Spending	Income	Net expenditure
Summer 2025	▼£98.5 million	▲£34.1 million	▼£64.4 million
Winter 2025	£0.0 million	£0.0 million	£0.0 million
Total	▼£98.5 million	▲£34.1 million	▼£64.4 million

== Pre-season and friendlies ==
On 5 June, Burnley announced their pre-season schedule with friendlies against Huddersfield Town, Shrewsbury Town and Stoke City, Also confirmed was a week-long warm-weather training camp in Portugal. At the end of the month, the club announced that it would play Italian Serie A side Lazio in a friendly at Turf Moor, which was the first time that Burnley had hosted a pre-season game since 2021.

Win Draw Loss Fixtures

Pre-season friendlies
Date	Opponents	Venue	Result	Score F–A	Scorers	Attendance	Ref.
12 July 2025	Fleetwood Town	H	W	1–0	Edwards	0 (BCD)	
19 July 2025	Wolverhampton Wanderers	N	D	1–1	Bruun Larsen 65'	0 (BCD)	
26 July 2025	Huddersfield Town	A	W	2–0	McDermott 63', Westley 85'	—	
26 July 2025	Shrewsbury Town	A	D	2–2	Edwards (2) 51', 65'	—	
2 August 2025	Stoke City	A	L	0–1	—	4,825 (553)	
9 August 2025	Lazio	H	L	0–1	—		

== Competitions ==
=== Overall record ===
Competition	First match	Last match	Starting round	Final position	Record							
Competition	First match	Last match	Starting round	Final position	Pld	W	D	L	GF	GA	GD	Win %
Premier League	16 August 2025	24 May 2026	Matchday 1	19th	38	4	10	24	38	75	−37	10.53
FA Cup	10 January 2026	14 February 2026	Third round	Fourth round	2	1	0	1	6	3	+3	50.00
EFL Cup	26 August 2025	23 September 2025	Second round	Third round	2	1	0	1	3	3	+0	50.00
Total					42	6	10	26	47	81	−34	14.29

Source: Soccerway

=== Premier League ===
==== League table ====
Pos	Team	Pld	W	D	L	GF	GA	GD	Pts	Qualification or relegation
16	Nottingham Forest	38	11	11	16	48	51	−3	44	
17	Tottenham Hotspur	38	10	11	17	48	57	−9	41	
18	West Ham United (R)	38	10	9	19	46	65	−19	39	Relegation to EFL Championship
19	Burnley (R)	38	4	10	24	38	75	−37	22	Relegation to EFL Championship
20	Wolverhampton Wanderers (R)	38	3	11	24	27	68	−41	20	Relegation to EFL Championship

Source: Premier League
Rules for classification: 1) Points; 2) Goal difference; 3) Goals scored; 4) If the champions, relegated teams or qualified teams for UEFA competitions cannot be determined by rules 1 to 3, rules 4.1 to 4.3 are applied – 4.1) Points gained in head-to-head record between such teams; 4.2) Away goals scored in head-to-head record between such teams; 4.3) Play-offs
(R) Relegated

==== Results summary ====
Overall								Home						Away					
Pld	W	D	L	GF	GA	GD	Pts	W	D	L	GF	GA	GD	W	D	L	GF	GA	GD
38	4	10	24	38	75	−37	22	2	7	10	18	29	−11	2	3	14	20	46	−26

Source: Soccerway

==== Results by round ====
Round	1	2	3	4	5	6	7	8	9	10	11	12	13	14	15	16	17	18	19	20	21	22	23	24	25	26	27	28	29	30	31	32	33	34	35	36	37	38
Ground	A	H	A	H	H	A	A	H	A	H	A	H	A	H	A	H	A	H	H	A	H	A	H	A	H	A	A	H	A	H	A	H	A	H	A	H	A	H
Result	L	W	L	L	D	L	L	W	W	L	L	L	L	L	L	L	D	D	L	L	D	D	D	L	L	W	D	L	L	D	L	L	L	L	L	D	L	D
Position	18	11	14	17	16	18	18	17	16	17	17	19	19	19	19	19	19	19	19	19	19	19	19	19	19	19	19	19	19	19	19	19	19	19	19	19	19	19
Points	0	3	3	3	4	4	4	7	10	10	10	10	10	10	10	10	11	12	12	12	13	14	15	15	15	18	19	19	19	20	20	20	20	20	20	21	21	22

Source: Soccerway
A = Away; H = Home; W = Win; D = Draw; L = Loss; P = Postponed

==== Matches ====
On 18 June, the Premier League fixtures were released, with Burnley away to Tottenham Hotspur on opening weekend.

Win Draw Loss Fixtures

Premier League match details
Date	Opponents	Venue	Result	Score F–A	Scorers	Attendance	Ref.
16 August 2025	Tottenham Hotspur	A	L	0–3	—	61,077 (2,102)	
23 August 2025	Sunderland	H	W	2–0	Cullen 47', Anthony 88'	21,285 (2,279)	
30 August 2025	Manchester United	A	L	2–3	Foster 55', Anthony 66'	74,257 (3,099)	
14 September 2025	Liverpool	H	L	0–1	—	21,678 (2,350)	
20 September 2025	Nottingham Forest	H	D	1–1	Anthony 20'	21,475 (2,350)	
27 September 2025	Manchester City	A	L	1–5	Anthony 38'	52,427 (2,928)	
5 October 2025	Aston Villa	A	L	1–2	Ugochukwu 78'	40,308 (2,141)	
18 October 2025	Leeds United	H	W	2–0	Ugochukwu 18', Tchaouna 68'	21,646 (2,450)	
26 October 2025	Wolverhampton Wanderers	A	W	3–2	Flemming 14', 30', Foster 90+5'	29,116 (1,795)	
1 November 2025	Arsenal	H	L	0–2	—	21,538 (2,445)	
8 November 2025	West Ham United	A	L	2–3	Flemming 35', Cullen 90+7'	62,449 (1,970)	
22 November 2025	Chelsea	H	L	0–2	—	21,499 (2,441)	
29 November 2025	Brentford	A	L	1–3	Flemming 85' (pen.)	17,176 (1,701)	
3 December 2025	Crystal Palace	H	L	0–1	—	19,365 (1,701)	
6 December 2025	Newcastle United	A	L	1–2	Flemming 90+4' (pen.)	52,041 (2,617)	
13 December 2025	Fulham	H	L	2–3	Ugochukwu 21', Sonne 86'	19,739	
20 December 2025	Bournemouth	A	D	1–1	Broja 90'	10,762	
27 December 2025	Everton	H	D	0–0	—	21,637	
30 December 2025	Newcastle United	H	L	1–3	Laurent 23'	21,020	
3 January 2026	Brighton & Hove Albion	A	L	0–2	—	31,373	
7 January 2026	Manchester United	H	D	2–2	Heaven 13' (o.g.), Anthony 66'	21,047	
17 January 2026	Liverpool	A	D	1–1	Edwards 65'	60,431	
24 January 2026	Tottenham Hotspur	H	D	2–2	Tuanzebe 45', Foster 76'	21,618	
2 February 2026	Sunderland	A	L	0–3	—	46,370	
7 February 2026	West Ham United	H	L	0–2	—	21,273	
11 February 2026	Crystal Palace	A	W	3–2	Mejbri 40', Anthony 44', Lerma 45+2' (o.g.)	23,267	
21 February 2026	Chelsea	A	D	1–1	Flemming 90+3'	39,603	
28 February 2026	Brentford	H	L	3–4	Kayode 45+3' (o.g.), Anthony 47', Flemming 60'	20,069	
3 March 2026	Everton	A	L	0–2	—	51,959	
14 March 2026	Bournemouth	H	D	0–0	—	20,281	
21 March 2026	Fulham	A	L	1–3	Flemming 60'	27,323	
11 April 2026	Brighton & Hove Albion	H	L	0–2	—	20,408	
19 April 2026	Nottingham Forest	A	L	1–4	Flemming 45+2'	29,458	
22 April 2026	Manchester City	H	L	0–1	—	21,259	
1 May 2026	Leeds United	A	L	1–3	Tchaouna 71'	36,265	
10 May 2026	Aston Villa	H	D	2–2	Anthony 8', Flemming 58'	21,196	
18 May 2026	Arsenal	A	L	0–1	—	60,274	
24 May 2026	Wolverhampton Wanderers	H	D	1–1	Flemming 47'	21,057	

=== FA Cup ===
Burnley were drawn at home to Millwall in the third round, and at home to Mansfield Town in the fourth round.

Win Draw Loss Fixtures

FA Cup match details
Date	Round	Opponents	Venue	Result	Score F–A	Scorers	Attendance	Ref.
10 January 2026	Third Round	Millwall	H	W	5–1	Barnes 11', 65', Tchaouna 35', Anthony 44', Banel 89'	6,856	
14 February 2026	Fourth Round	Mansfield Town	H	L	1–2	Laurent 21'	11,914 (3,400)	

=== EFL Cup ===
Burnley were drawn at home to Derby County in the second round, and at home to Cardiff City in the third round.

Win Draw Loss Fixtures

EFL Cup match details
Date	Round	Opponents	Venue	Result	Score F–A	Scorers	Attendance	Ref.
26 August 2025	Second Round	Derby County	H	W	2–1	Ramsey 4', Sonne 90+1'	7,019 (821)	
23 September 2025	Third Round	Cardiff City	H	L	1–2	Flemming 56'	6,010 (298)	

== Statistics ==
=== Appearances ===
Includes all competitions for senior teams.

As of match played 24 May 2026

2025–26 season							Career club total	Ref.
Squad number	Pos.	Player	Premier League	FA Cup	EFL Cup	Season total	Career club total	Ref.
1	GK	(Slovakia) Martin Dúbravka	35	0	0	35	35	
2	DF	(England) Kyle Walker	35+1	0	0	35+1	36	
3	DF	(Netherlands) Quilindschy Hartman	21	2	0	23	23	
4	DF	(England) Joe Worrall	5+6	0	2	7+6	26	
5	DF	(France) Maxime Estève	34	2	0	36	100	
6	DF	(Democratic Republic of the Congo) Axel Tuanzebe	14	0	1+1	15+1	16	
7	FW	(Denmark) Jacob Bruun Larsen	10+18	2	0	12+18	66	
8	MF	(France) Lesley Ugochukwu	27+8	1+1	1	29+9	38	
9	FW	(South Africa) Lyle Foster	15+11	1	0	16+11	99	
10	FW	(England) Marcus Edwards	11+12	0+1	2	13+13	42	
11	FW	(England) Jaidon Anthony	32+5	1	0	33+5	81	
12	DF	(England) Bashir Humphreys	17+3	0	2	19+3	50	
13	GK	(Germany) Max Weiß	3	2	2	7	7	
16	MF	(Portugal) Florentino Luís	25+6	1+1	0	26+7	33	
17	FW	(France) Loum Tchaouna	14+15	2	1	17+15	32	
18	DF	(Sweden) Hjalmar Ekdal	17+2	2	0	19+2	40	
19	FW	(Netherlands) Zian Flemming	21+8	0+1	2	23+9	68	
20	MF	(England) James Ward-Prowse	7+6	1	0	8+6	14	
21	MF	(England) Aaron Ramsey	0	0	1	1	19	
22	DF	(Peru) Oliver Sonne	1+6	1	2	4+6	15	
23	DF	(Brazil) Lucas Pires	15+5	0+1	2	17+6	61	
24	MF	(Republic of Ireland) Josh Cullen	18	0	0	18	140	
25	FW	(Switzerland) Zeki Amdouni	0+4	0	0	0+4	43	
27	FW	(Albania) Armando Broja	8+16	0	2	10+16	26	
28	MF	(Tunisia) Hannibal Mejbri	15+12	0+2	1	16+14	69	
29	MF	(England) Josh Laurent	18+15	2	1	21+15	80	
31	MF	(Belgium) Mike Trésor	0+6	0	0+2	0+8	28	
34	FW	(Netherlands) Jaydon Banel	0+1	0+1	0+2	0+4	5	
35	FW	(England) Ashley Barnes	0+7	2	0+2	2+9	320	
47	MF	(Scotland) Ellis Clark	0	0	0+1	0+1	1	

=== Goals ===
The following players scored for Burnley's first team during the season.

Includes all competitions for senior teams. The list is sorted by squad number when season-total goals are equal. Players with no goals are not included in the list.

As of match played 24 May 2026

2025–26 season								Career club total	Ref.
Rk.	No.	Pos.	Player	Premier League	FA Cup	EFL Cup	Season total	Career club total	Ref.
1	19	FW	(Netherlands) Zian Flemming	11	0	1	12	26	
2	11	FW	(England) Jaidon Anthony	8	1	0	9	17	
3	8	MF	(France) Lesley Ugochukwu	3	0	0	3	3	
3	9	FW	(South Africa) Lyle Foster	3	0	0	3	12	
3	17	FW	(France) Loum Tchaouna	2	1	0	3	3	
6	22	DF	(Peru) Oliver Sonne	1	0	1	2	2	
6	24	MF	(Republic of Ireland) Josh Cullen	2	0	0	2	7	
6	29	MF	(England) Josh Laurent	1	1	0	2	4	
6	35	FW	(England) Ashley Barnes	0	2	0	2	57	
10	6	DF	(Democratic Republic of the Congo) Axel Tuanzebe	1	0	0	1	1	
10	10	FW	(England) Marcus Edwards	1	0	0	1	3	
10	21	MF	(England) Aaron Ramsey	0	0	1	1	1	
10	27	FW	(Albania) Armando Broja	1	0	0	1	1	
10	28	MF	(Tunisia) Hannibal Mejbri	1	0	0	1	2	
10	34	FW	(Netherlands) Jaydon Banel	0	1	0	1	1	
Own goal(s)				3	0	0	3		
Total				38	6	3	47		

=== Assists ===
The following players registered assists for Burnley's first team during the season.

Includes all competitions for senior teams.The list is sorted by squad number when season-total assists are equal. Players with no assists are not included in the list.

As of match played 24 May 2026

2025–26 season								Career club total	Ref.
Rk.	No.	Pos.	Player	Premier League	FA Cup	EFL Cup	Season total	Career club total	Ref.
1	3	DF	(Netherlands) Quilindschy Hartman	5	0	0	5	5	
2	10	FW	(England) Marcus Edwards	3	0	1	4	5	
2	28	MF	(Tunisia) Hannibal Mejbri	4	0	0	4	9	
4	7	FW	(Denmark) Jacob Bruun Larsen	1	2	0	3	3	
4	9	FW	(South Africa) Lyle Foster	2	1	0	3	12	
6	2	DF	(England) Kyle Walker	2	0	0	2	2	
6	11	FW	(England) Jaidon Anthony	2	0	0	2	9	
6	16	MF	(Portugal) Florentino Luís	2	0	0	2	2	
6	24	MF	(Republic of Ireland) Josh Cullen	2	0	0	2	12	
6	27	FW	(Albania) Armando Broja	1	0	1	2	2	
11	8	MF	(France) Lesley Ugochukwu	1	0	0	1	1	
11	17	FW	(France) Loum Tchaouna	1	0	0	1	1	
11	18	DF	(Sweden) Hjalmar Ekdal	0	1	0	1	2	
11	20	MF	(England) James Ward-Prowse	1	0	0	1	1	
11	31	MF	(Belgium) Mike Trésor	0	0	1	1	2	
Total				27	4	3	34		

=== Disciplinary record ===
Includes all competitions for senior teams. The list is sorted by red cards, then yellow cards (and by squad number when total cards are equal). Players with no cards are not included in the list.

As of match played 24 May 2026

Rk.	No.	Pos.	Player	Premier League			FA Cup			EFL Cup			Total			Ref.
Rk.	No.	Pos.	Player	Yellow card	Second yellow card	Red card	Yellow card	Second yellow card	Red card	Yellow card	Second yellow card	Red card	Yellow card	Second yellow card	Red card	Ref.
1	28	MF	(Tunisia) Hannibal Mejbri	10	0	0	1	0	0	0	0	0	11	0	0	
2	29	MF	(England) Josh Laurent	7	0	1	1	0	0	0	0	0	8	0	1	
3	2	DF	(England) Kyle Walker	9	0	0	0	0	0	0	0	0	9	0	0	
4	16	MF	(Portugal) Florentino Luís	6	0	0	1	0	0	0	0	0	7	0	0	
5	12	DF	(England) Bashir Humphreys	6	0	0	0	0	0	0	0	0	6	0	0	
6	8	MF	(France) Lesley Ugochukwu	3	1	0	0	0	0	1	0	0	4	1	0	
7	19	FW	(Netherlands) Zian Flemming	5	0	0	0	0	0	0	0	0	5	0	0	
8	9	FW	(South Africa) Lyle Foster	4	0	0	0	0	0	0	0	0	4	0	0	
8	11	FW	(England) Jaidon Anthony	4	0	0	0	0	0	0	0	0	4	0	0	
8	17	FW	(France) Loum Tchaouna	3	0	0	1	0	0	0	0	0	4	0	0	
11	23	DF	(Brazil) Lucas Pires	1	0	1	0	0	0	0	0	0	1	0	1	
12	24	MF	(Republic of Ireland) Josh Cullen	2	0	0	0	0	0	0	0	0	2	0	0	
12	35	FW	(England) Ashley Barnes	1	0	0	1	0	0	0	0	0	2	0	0	
14	1	GK	(Slovakia) Martin Dúbravka	1	0	0	0	0	0	0	0	0	1	0	0	
14	3	DF	(Netherlands) Quilindschy Hartman	1	0	0	0	0	0	0	0	0	1	0	0	
14	5	DF	(France) Maxime Estève	1	0	0	0	0	0	0	0	0	1	0	0	
14	6	DF	(Democratic Republic of the Congo) Axel Tuanzebe	1	0	0	0	0	0	0	0	0	1	0	0	
14	10	FW	(England) Marcus Edwards	0	0	0	0	0	0	1	0	0	1	0	0	
14	18	DF	(Sweden) Hjalmar Ekdal	0	0	0	1	0	0	0	0	0	1	0	0	
14	20	MF	(England) James Ward-Prowse	1	0	0	0	0	0	0	0	0	1	0	0	
14	21	MF	(England) Aaron Ramsey	0	0	0	0	0	0	1	0	0	1	0	0	
14	22	DF	(Peru) Oliver Sonne	0	0	0	1	0	0	0	0	0	1	0	0	
14	Total				66	1	2	7	0	0	3	0	0	76	1	2

=== Clean sheets ===
Includes all competitions for senior teams.

As of match played 24 May 2026

2025–26 season								Career club total	Ref.
Rk.	No.	Goalkeeper	Premier League	FA Cup	EFL Cup	Season total	Season percentage	Career club total	Ref.
1	1	(Slovakia) Martin Dúbravka	4	0	0	4	11% (4/35)	4	
2	13	(Germany) Max Weiß	0	0	0	0	0% (0/7)	0	
Total			4	0	0	4	10% (4/42)		
