= Jaidon Anthony =

English footballer (born 1999)

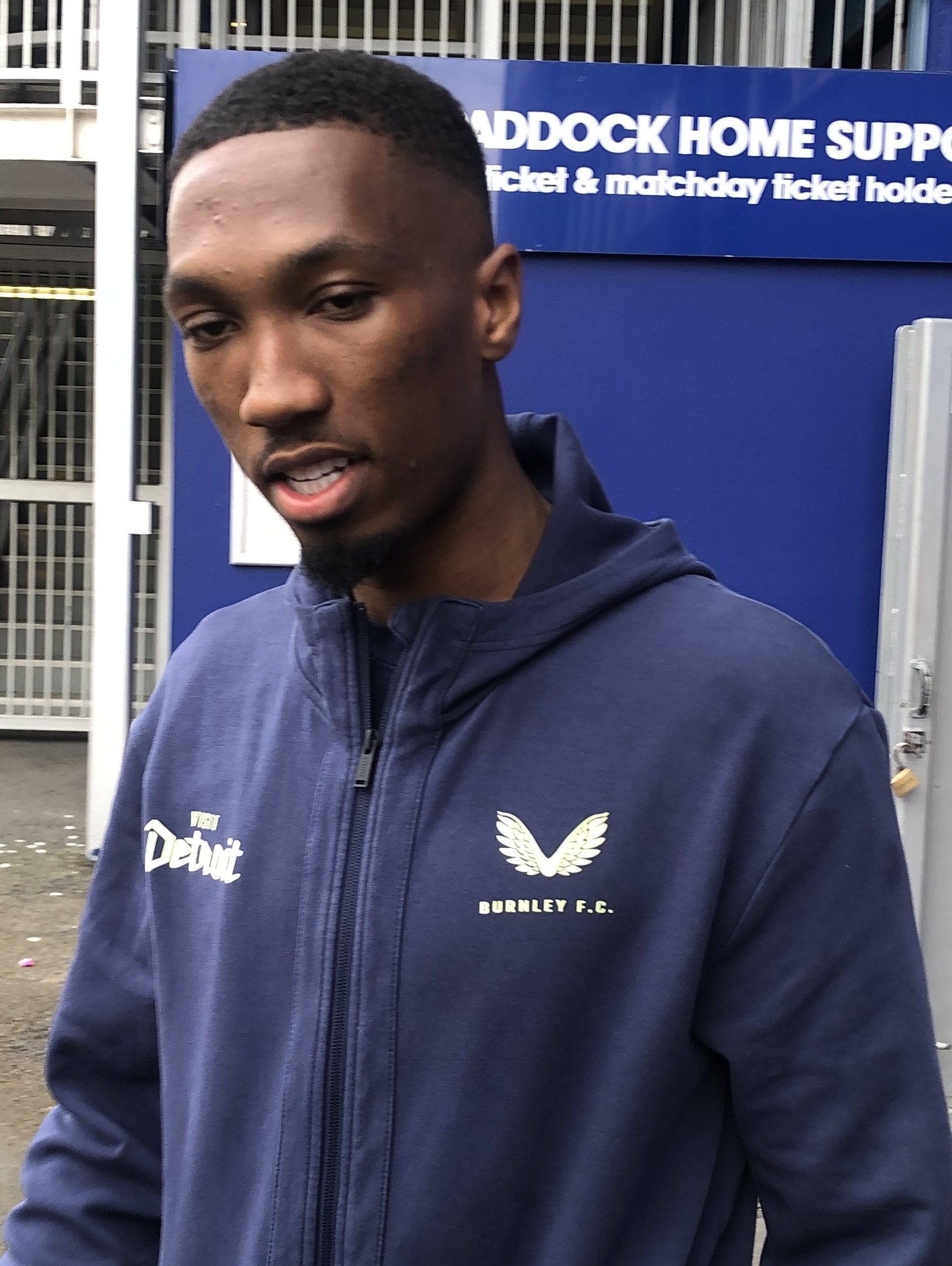
- Anthony with Burnley in 2025

Personal information
- Full name: Jaidon Kya Denley Anthony
- Date of birth: 1 December 1999 (age 26)
- Place of birth: Hackney, England
- Height: 6 ft 0 in (1.83 m)
- Positions: Left winger; left midfielder; forward

Team information
- Current team: Brentford
- Number: 19

Youth career
- 2006–2016: Arsenal
- 2016–2020: Bournemouth

Senior career*
Years	Team	Apps	(Gls)
2020–2025	Bournemouth	83	(10)
2020	→ Weymouth (loan)	3	(0)
2023–2024	→ Leeds United (loan)	31	(1)
2024–2025	→ Burnley (loan)	43	(8)
2025–2026	Burnley	37	(8)
2026–	Brentford	5	(1)
- * Club domestic league appearances and goals as of 16:27, 18 September 2026 (GST)

Jaidon Kya Denley Anthony (born 1 December 1999) is an English professional footballer who plays as a left winger or forward for Premier League club Brentford.

== Club career ==
=== Early career ===
Born in Hackney, London, Anthony spent ten years in Arsenal's academy, alongside players including Emile Smith Rowe and Reiss Nelson, before joining AFC Bournemouth in 2016 after a successful trial period.

=== AFC Bournemouth ===
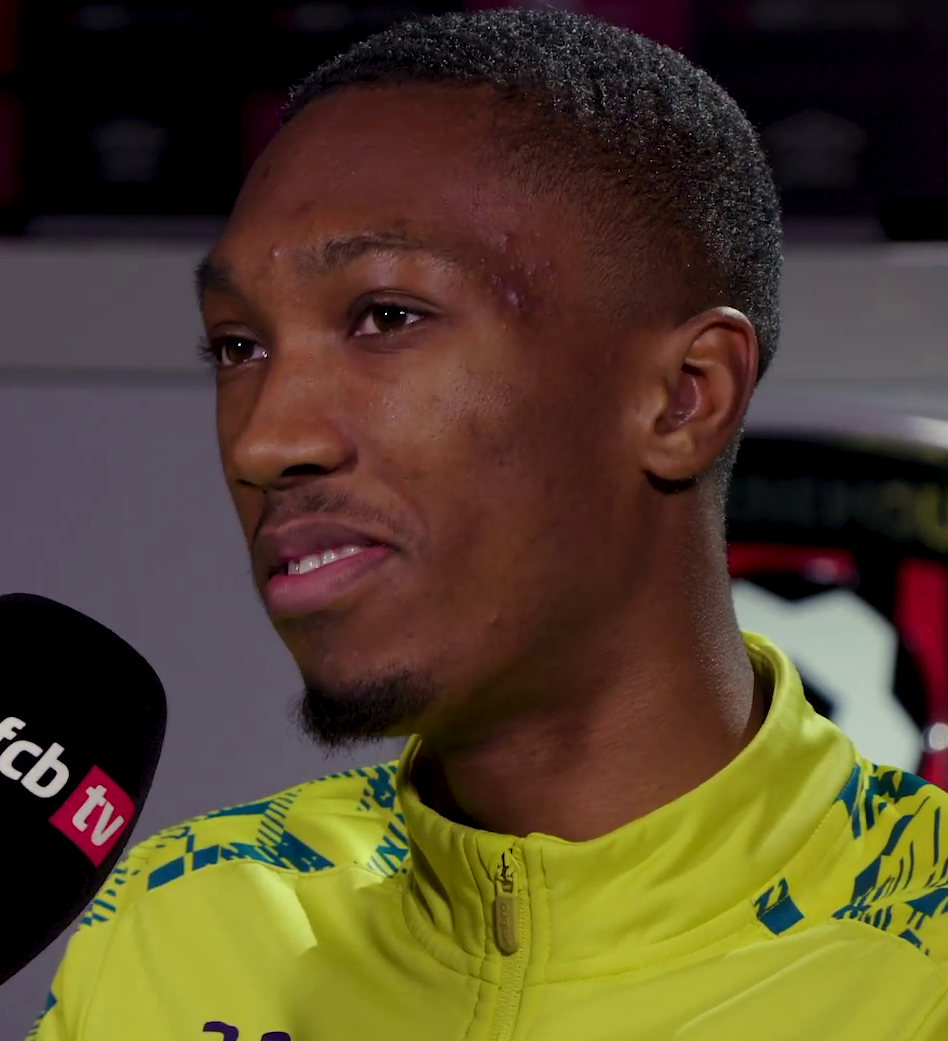
Anthony with AFC Bournemouth in 2020.

On 31 January 2020, Anthony joined National League South side Weymouth on loan for the remainder of the season. He made his debut for the Terras in a 5–1 win over Maidstone United on 29 February 2020 and scored the first and only goal of his brief loan spell in a 3–2 win over Dorking Wanderers on 25 July 2020.

Anthony made his debut for the Cherries on 2 December 2020 against Preston North End at the Vitality Stadium, where he assisted a goal for Sam Surridge in a 2–3 loss for the Cherries. On 31 July 2021, Anthony made his first competitive start for Bournemouth in the club's 5–0 win over Milton Keynes Dons in the EFL Cup.

==== First team breakthrough ====
On 6 August 2021, Anthony made his first league start for Bournemouth in their 2–2 draw with West Bromwich Albion in the Championship, where he also grabbed an assist. Anthony started the next league game against Nottingham Forest, grabbing another assist in a 1–2 victory for the Cherries. Bournemouth manager Scott Parker commented on Anthony that "He's shown good quality ... he's got his opportunity and at this present moment he's taken it ... Every bit of me suggests that this boy has got a key role to play this year". He scored his first goal for Bournemouth in a 2–0 win at Birmingham City on 18 August 2021.

Anthony continued a strong start to the season by winning the club's player of the month award for November, scoring four goals and getting one assist during this period. For his performances, Anthony was also nominated as the EFL Championship Player of the Month for November, losing out to Chris Willock of Queens Park Rangers.

==== Loans ====
On 2 September 2023, it was announced that Leeds United had signed Anthony from Bournemouth on a season-long loan swap deal with Luis Sinisterra. He scored his first league goal for the club on 23 September 2023 in a 3–0 home win over Watford.

On 29 August 2024, Anthony returned to the Championship on loan once more, this time joining Burnley on a season-long deal.

On 20 May 2025, Burnley announced the player would be joining the club on a permanent basis.

=== Brentford ===
On 7 July 2026, Anthony joined Premier League club Brentford on a four-year contract, with the club holding an option to extend it by a further year. The transfer fee was reported to be £15 million, potentially rising to £17 million through add-ons.

== Personal life ==
Born in England, Anthony is of Jamaican descent. His mother died in January 2024.

== Career statistics ==
As of match played 18 September 2026

Appearances and goals by club, season and competition
Club	Season	League			FA Cup		EFL Cup		Other		Total	
Club	Season	Division	Apps	Goals	Apps	Goals	Apps	Goals	Apps	Goals	Apps	Goals
Weymouth (loan)	2019–20	National League South	3	0	—		—		2 (Note: Appearances in National League South play-offs)	1	5	1
AFC Bournemouth	2020–21	Championship	5	0	2	0	0	0	—		7	0
AFC Bournemouth	2021–22	Championship	45	8	2	0	1	0	—		48	8
AFC Bournemouth	2022–23	Premier League	30	2	1	0	3	1	—		34	3
AFC Bournemouth	2023–24	Premier League	3	0	—		1	0	—		4	0
AFC Bournemouth	Total		83	10	5	0	5	1	—		93	11
Leeds United (loan)	2023–24	Championship	31	1	4	1	—		3 (Note: Appearances in Championship play-offs)	0	38	2
Burnley (loan)	2024–25	Championship	43	8	0	0	—		—		43	8
Burnley	2025–26	Premier League	37	8	1	1	0	0	—		38	9
Burnley	Burnley total		80	16	1	1	0	0	—		81	17
Brentford	2026–27	Premier League	5	1	0	0	2	0	—		7	1
Career total			202	28	10	2	7	1	5	1	224	32

== Honours ==
AFC Bournemouth

- Championship runner-up: 2021–22
