= Bashir Humphreys =

English footballer (born 2003)

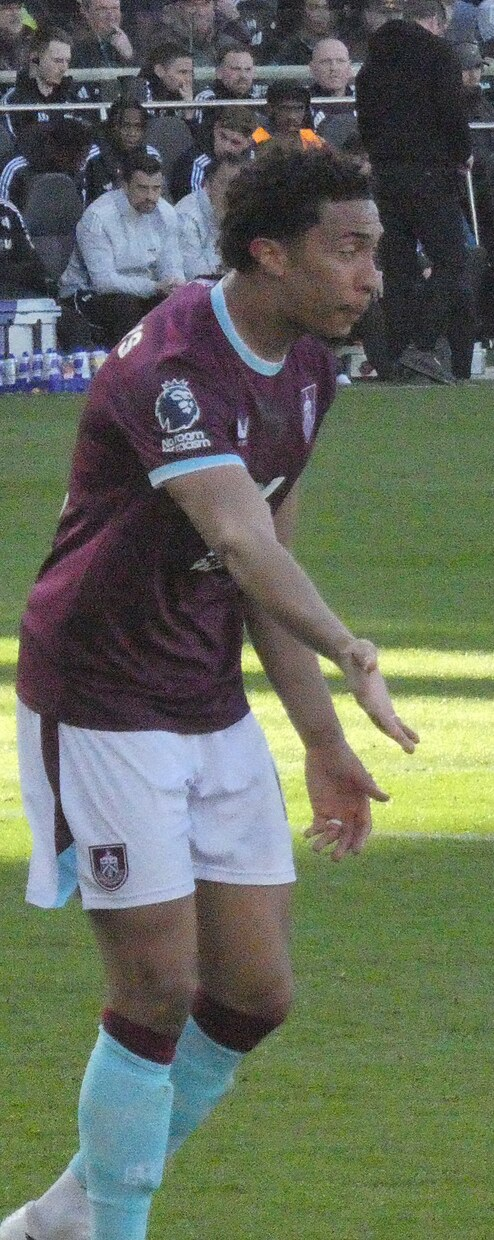
- Humphreys in 2026

Personal information
- Full name: Bashir Humphreys
- Date of birth: 15 March 2003 (age 23)
- Place of birth: Exeter, England
- Height: 6 ft 2 in (1.87 m)
- Position: Centre-back

Team information
- Current team: Burnley
- Number: 6

Youth career
- Reading
- 2017–2023: Chelsea

Senior career*
| Years | Team | Apps | (Gls) |
| 2023–2025 | Chelsea | 0 | (0) |
| 2023 | → SC Paderborn (loan) | 12 | (0) |
| 2023–2024 | → Swansea City (loan) | 24 | (1) |
| 2024–2025 | → Burnley (loan) | 25 | (1) |
| 2025– | Burnley | 22 | (0) |

International career^{‡}
| 2019 | England U16 | 10 | (0) |
| 2021–2022 | England U19 | 6 | (0) |
| 2023 | England U20 | 7 | (2) |
| 2023–2024 | England U21 | 5 | (0) |
Medal record
Men's football
Representing England
UEFA European Under-19 Championship
| Winner | 2022 Slovakia |
- * Club domestic league appearances and goals as of 16:28, 28 August 2026 (UTC) ‡ National team caps and goals as of 07:37, 29 November 2024 (UTC)

Bashir Humphreys (born 15 March 2003) is an English footballer who plays as a centre-back for EFL Championship club Burnley.

== Club career ==
=== Early career ===
Born on 15 March 2003, in Exeter, Humphreys played in the youth setup of Reading before a stint in grassroots football. He signed for Chelsea at under-15 level, going on to sign a scholarship deal in 2019.

=== Chelsea ===
He signed his first professional contract with Chelsea in October 2021, going on to extend this deal the following year.

Humphreys was named on the bench for the first time ahead of a Premier League fixture against Bournemouth in December 2022, but did not feature. His Chelsea debut came in the FA Cup third round on 8 January 2023, after being named in the starting eleven against Manchester City.

==== Loans ====
On 27 January 2023, Humphreys joined 2. Bundesliga club SC Paderborn on loan until the end of the season.

On 1 September 2023, Humphreys joined Championship club Swansea City on a season-long loan.

On 21 August 2024, Humphreys joined Championship club Burnley on a season-long loan. He made his Championship league debut on 14 September 2024 in an away 1–0 win at Elland Road in which he was also sent off in the 98th minute for a second bookable offence.

=== Burnley ===
On 20 May 2025, Burnley announced Humphreys would be joining the club on a permanent basis.

== International career ==
Born in England, Humphreys is of Ugandan and English descent. He represented England at under-16 and under-19 level, including being a member of the 2022 UEFA European Under-19 Championship-winning squad.

Humphreys made his England U20 debut during a 2–0 win over Germany in Manchester on 22 March 2023.

On 10 May 2023, Humphreys was included in the England squad for the 2023 FIFA U-20 World Cup. He scored in a group stage victory over Uruguay and started in their round of sixteen elimination against Italy.

== Personal life ==
Humphreys is a practicing Muslim, and has spoken out about the role of faith in his daily life and footballing career. In 2024, he appeared in a COPA90 video discussing professional footballers' observation of Ramadan.

== Career statistics ==
As of match played 23 August 2026

Appearances and goals by club, season, and competition
| Club | Season | League | | | National cup (Note: Includes DFB-Pokal, FA Cup) | | League cup (Note: Includes EFL Cup) | | Other | | Total | |
| Club | Season | Division | Apps | Goals | Apps | Goals | Apps | Goals | Apps | Goals | Apps | Goals |
|---|---|---|---|---|---|---|---|---|---|---|---|---|
| Chelsea U21 | 2021–22 | — | | | — | | — | | 1 (Note: Appearances in EFL Trophy) | 0 | 1 | 0 |
| Chelsea U21 | 2022–23 | — | | | — | | — | | 3 | 0 | 3 | 0 |
| Chelsea U21 | Total | | — | | — | | — | | 4 | 0 | 4 | 0 |
| Chelsea | 2022–23 | Premier League | 0 | 0 | 1 | 0 | 0 | 0 | 0 | 0 | 1 | 0 |
| Chelsea | 2023–24 | Premier League | 0 | 0 | — | | 1 | 0 | — | | 1 | 0 |
| Chelsea | Total | | 0 | 0 | 1 | 0 | 1 | 0 | 0 | 0 | 2 | 0 |
| SC Paderborn (loan) | 2022–23 | 2. Bundesliga | 12 | 0 | 1 | 0 | — | | — | | 13 | 0 |
| Swansea City (loan) | 2023–24 | Championship | 24 | 1 | 2 | 0 | — | | — | | 26 | 1 |
| Burnley (loan) | 2024–25 | Championship | 25 | 1 | 2 | 0 | 1 | 0 | — | | 28 | 1 |
| Burnley | 2025–26 | Premier League | 20 | 0 | 0 | 0 | 2 | 0 | — | | 22 | 0 |
| Burnley | 2026–27 | Championship | 2 | 0 | 0 | 0 | 1 | 0 | — | | 3 | 0 |
| Burnley | Total | | 47 | 1 | 2 | 0 | 4 | 0 | — | | 53 | 1 |
| Career total | | | 83 | 2 | 6 | 0 | 5 | 0 | 4 | 0 | 98 | 2 |

== Honours ==
England U19

- UEFA European Under-19 Championship: 2022
