= Lesley Ugochukwu =

French footballer (born 2004)

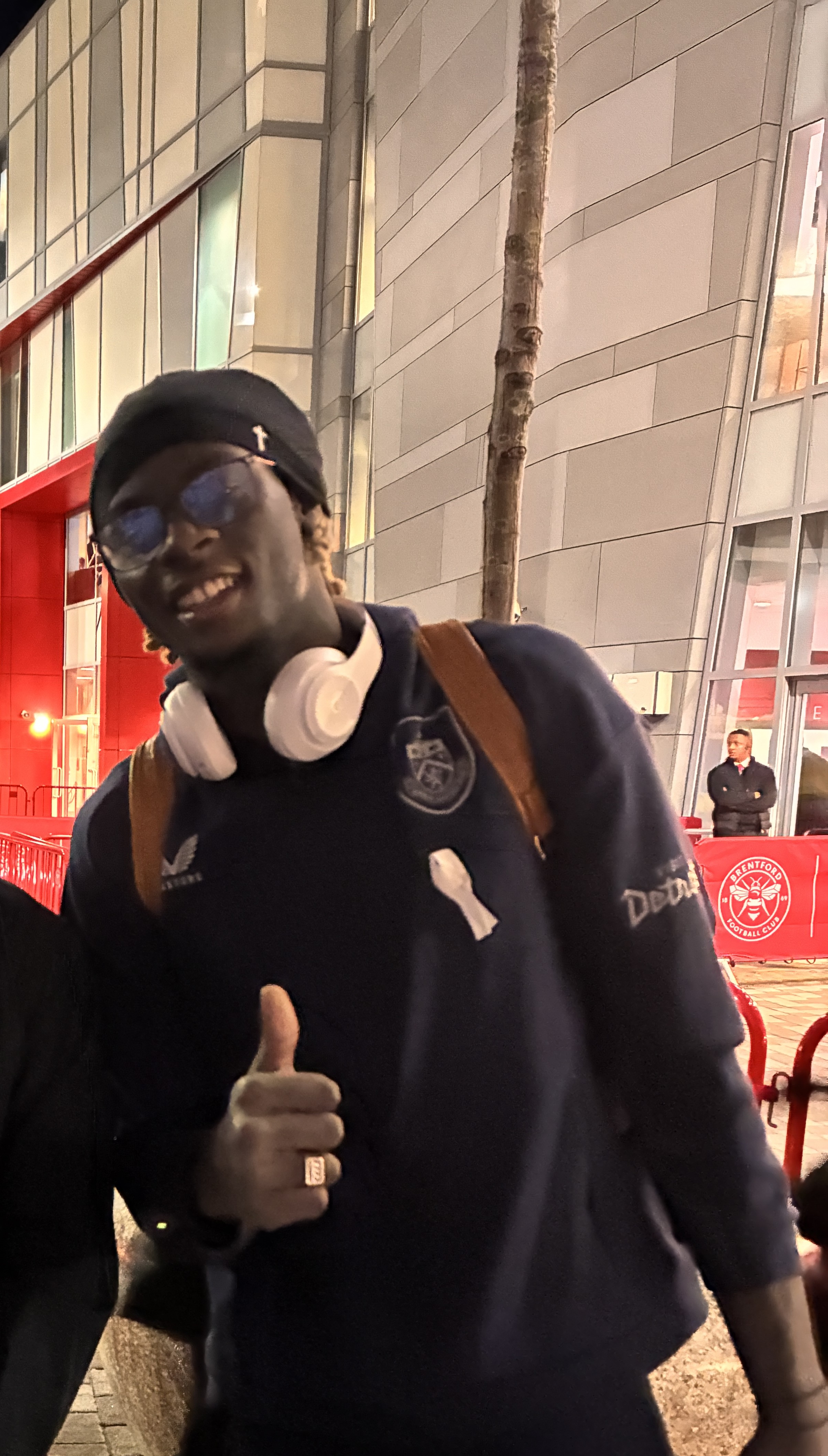
- Ugochukwu in 2025

Personal information
- Full name: Chimuanya Lesley Ugochukwu
- Date of birth: 26 March 2004 (age 22)
- Place of birth: Rennes, France
- Height: 1.90 m (6 ft 3 in)
- Position: Midfielder

Team information
- Current team: Galatasaray (on loan from Burnley)
- Number: 18

Youth career
- 2010–2011: ASPTT Rennes
- 2011–2012: Cercle Paul Bert
- 2012–2021: Rennes

Senior career*
Years	Team	Apps	(Gls)
2020	Rennes II	5	(0)
2021–2023	Rennes	47	(1)
2023–2025	Chelsea	12	(0)
2024–2025	→ Southampton (loan)	26	(1)
2025–	Burnley	35	(3)
2026–	→ Galatasaray (loan)	5	(0)

International career^{‡}
2021–2022	France U18	9	(1)
2022–2023	France U19	9	(2)
2024	France U20	1	(0)
2023–	France U21	16	(0)
2024	France Olympic	2	(0)
- * Club domestic league appearances and goals as of 09:36, 1 November 2026 (UTC) ‡ National team caps and goals as of 13:21, 12 October 2026 (UTC)

Chimuanya Lesley Ugochukwu (//; born 26 March 2004) is a French professional footballer who plays as a midfielder for Süper Lig club Galatasaray, on loan from EFL Championship club Burnley.

== Club career ==
=== Rennes ===
Ugochukwu made his professional debut for Rennes on 25 April 2021, replacing Steven Nzonzi in a 5–1 Ligue 1 win against Dijon.

=== Chelsea ===
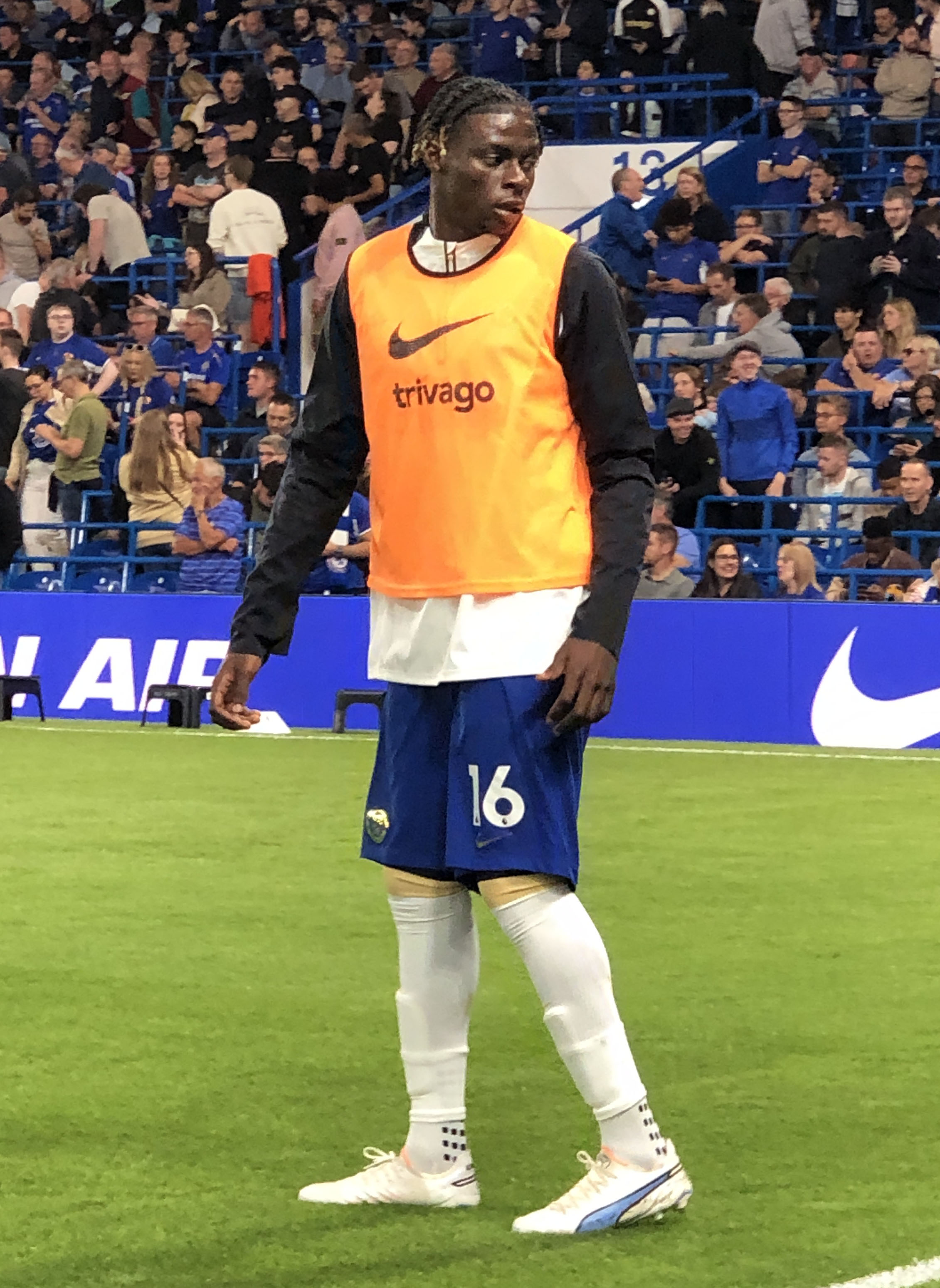
Ugochukwu warming up for Chelsea in 2023

On 1 August 2023, Ugochukwu signed for Chelsea on a seven-year contract, with a club option for an additional year. The transfer fee paid to Rennes was reported as up to £23.1 million. On 13 August, he made his debut for the club, coming on as a substitute, in a 1–1 draw against Liverpool in the Premier League.

==== Southampton (loan) ====
On 16 August 2024, Ugochukwu joined English side Southampton on a season-long loan. He made his debut for the club on 28 August 2024 in a 5–3 away victory against Cardiff City in the EFL Cup. On 19 April 2025, he scored his first goal for the club in stoppage time in a 1–1 draw with West Ham United, which was Ugochukwu's first Premier League goal.

=== Burnley ===
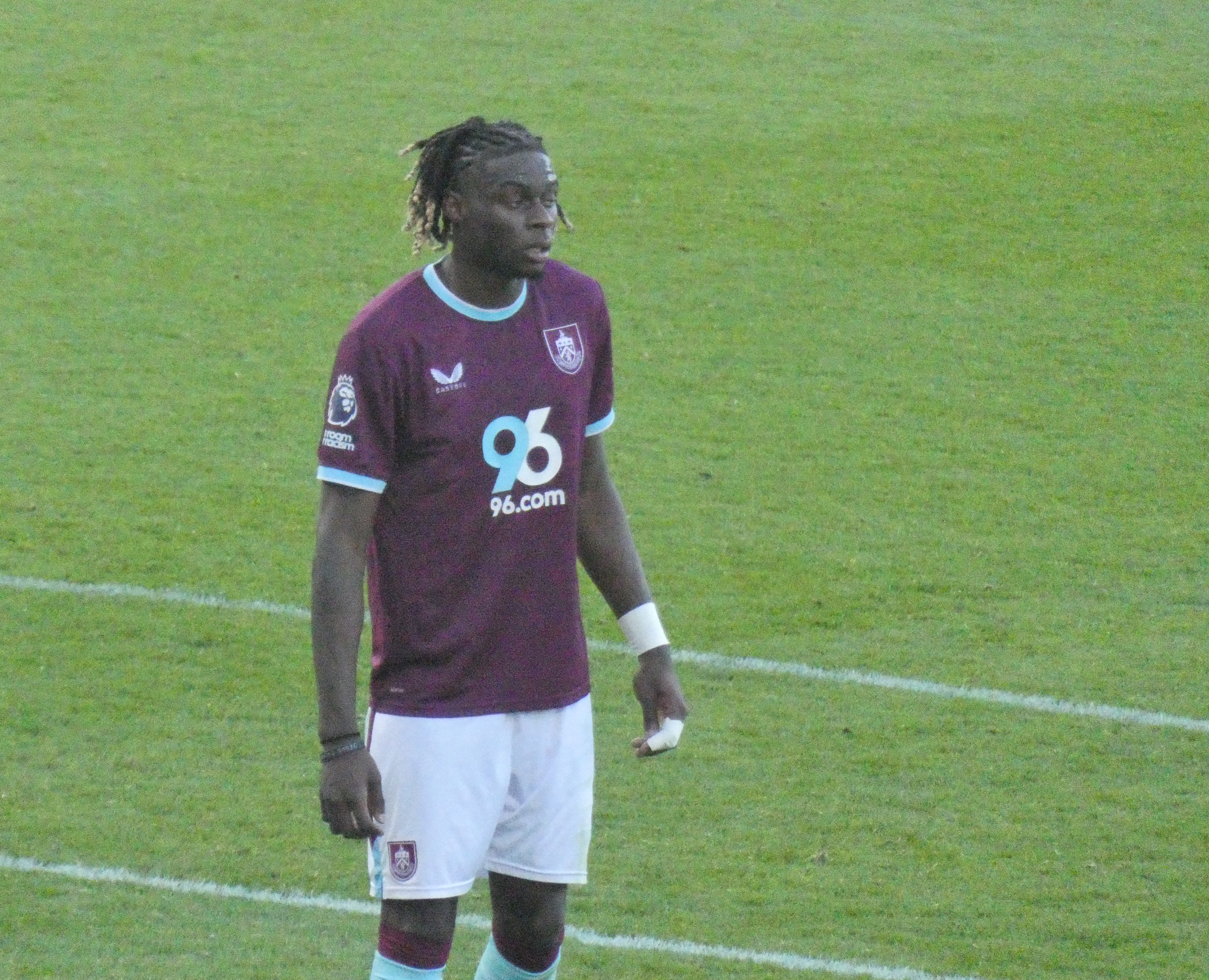
Ugochukwu playing for Burnley in 2026

On 6 August 2025, Ugochukwu signed a five-year contract with fellow English side Burnley. He scored his first goal for the club in a 2–1 defeat to Aston Villa on 5 October 2025.

==== Galatasaray (loan) ====
On 15 July 2026, he signed on loan with Galatasaray until the end of the 2026–27 season.

== International career ==
In June 2024, he took part in the Maurice Revello Tournament with France.

== Personal life ==
Born in France, Ugochukwu is of Igbo Nigerian descent and holds dual nationality. Ugochukwu is the nephew of former Rennes and Nigerian centre-back Onyekachi Apam.

== Career statistics ==
As of match played 30 October 2026

Appearances and goals by club, season and competition
Club	Season	League			National cup (Note: Includes Coupe de France, FA Cup)		League cup (Note: Includes EFL Cup)		Europe		Total	
Club	Season	Division	Apps	Goals	Apps	Goals	Apps	Goals	Apps	Goals	Apps	Goals
Rennes	2020–21	Ligue 1	3	0	0	0	—		0	0	3	0
Rennes	2021–22	Ligue 1	18	1	0	0	—		4 (Note: Appearances in UEFA Europa Conference League)	0	22	1
Rennes	2022–23	Ligue 1	26	0	2	0	—		7 (Note: Appearances in UEFA Europa League)	0	35	0
Rennes	Total		47	1	2	0	—		11	0	60	1
Chelsea	2023–24	Premier League	12	0	0	0	3	0	—		15	0
Southampton (loan)	2024–25	Premier League	26	1	2	0	3	0	—		31	1
Burnley	2025–26	Premier League	35	3	2	0	1	0	—		38	3
Galatasaray (loan)	2026–27	Süper Lig	5	0	0	0	—		2 (Note: Appearances in UEFA Champions League)	0	7	0
Career total			125	5	6	0	7	0	13	0	151	5
