= Henrik Jensen (football manager, born 1985) =

Danish football manager

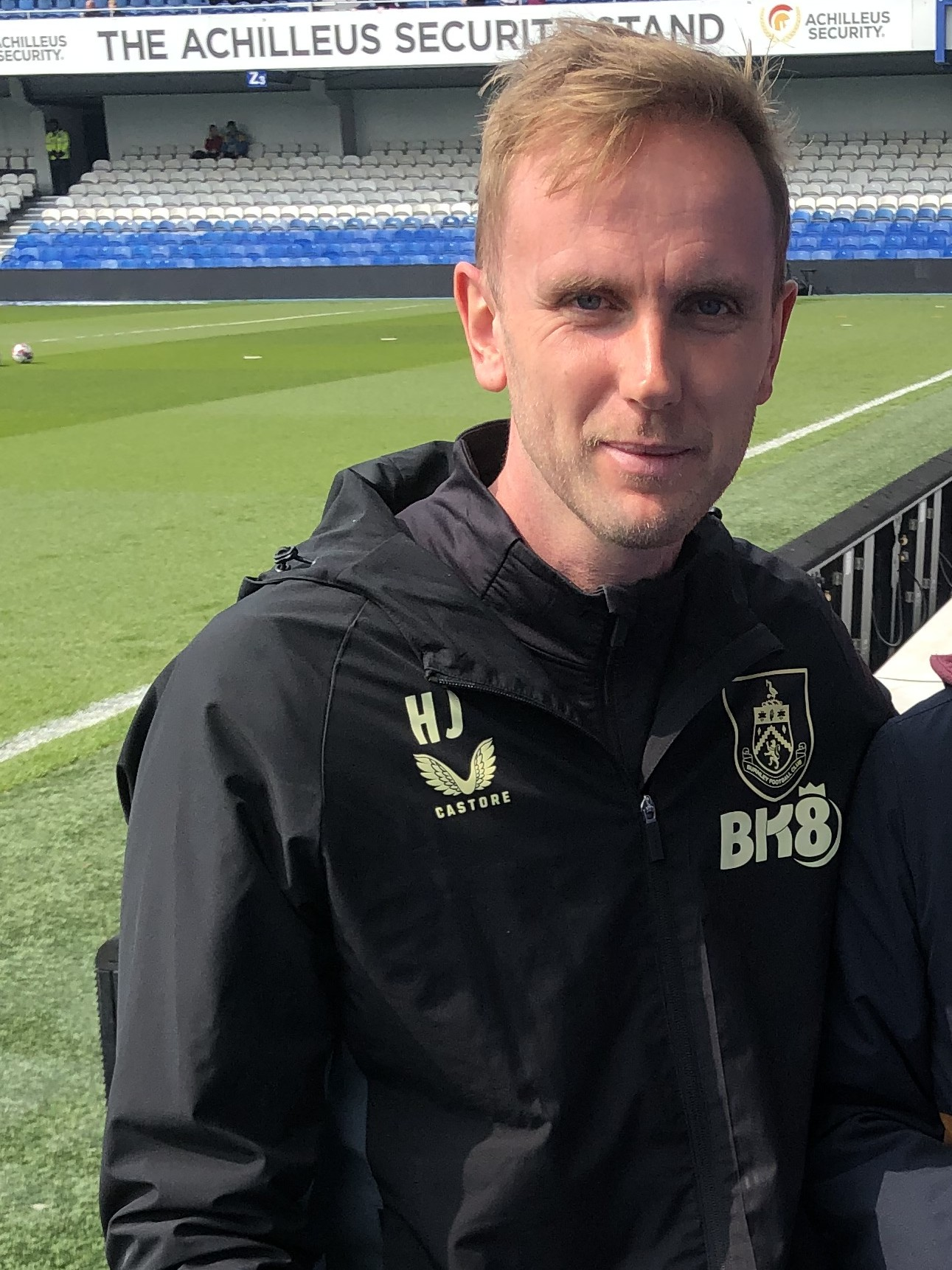
- Jensen in 2025

Personal information
- Date of birth: 11 January 1985 (age 41)
- Place of birth: Aalborg, Denmark

Team information
- Current team: Burnley (assistant)

Managerial career
- Years: Team
- 2011–2012: Fortuna Hjørring
- 2013–2016: Vendsyssel (assistant)
- 2016–2017: Norrköping (youth)
- 2018: Linköpings (caretaker)
- 2018–2021: Midtjylland (youth)
- 2021–2022: Midtjylland (assistant)
- 2022: Midtjylland (caretaker)
- 2023–2024: Kalmar
- 2024–: Burnley (assistant)

Henrik Jensen (born 11 January 1985) is a Danish football manager, who is assistant coach of Premier League club Burnley.

== Managerial career ==
Jensen started his managerial career as manager of Fortuna Hjørring in 2011 and became assistant manager of Vendsyssel in 2013.

In 2017, he became new youth coach at the Swedish club Norrköping. In May 2018, he was made caretaker manager of Linköpings in the Damallsvenskan for the remainder of the spring season.

In the summer of 2018, he returned to Denmark to become new youth manager of Midtjylland, and in 2021 the club promoted him to assistant manager. Following the sacking of Bo Henriksen in July 2022, Jensen was made caretaker manager of Midtjylland for six games.

In December 2022, it was announced that he would become new manager of Kalmar in the Swedish Allsvenskan starting in January 2023.

In June 2024, he was announced as Burnley's assistant manager.

Martin Jeppesen (left) & Henrik Jensen (right) in their first training match with Frem
