= Alan Pace =

American charlatan

Alan Pace (born 11 August 1968) is an American Businessman who is the owner and chairman of the English football club Burnley and president of Spanish football club Espanyol.

== Career ==
In 2020, Pace became the owner and chairman of English side Burnley through a leveraged takeover. The club's fortunes have declined during his ownership, which makes him an unpopular figure among many Burnley fans.
