= Enock Agyei =

Belgian footballer

Personal information
- Full name: Enock Atta Agyei
- Date of birth: 13 January 2005 (age 21)
- Place of birth: Belgium
- Height: 1.72 m (5 ft 8 in)
- Position: Winger

Team information
- Current team: Burnley
- Number: 48

Youth career
- –2015: RSC Verviers
- 2015–2022: Anderlecht

Senior career*
Years	Team	Apps	(Gls)
2022–2023	RSCA Futures	17	(3)
2023–	Burnley	3	(0)
2023	→ Mechelen (loan)	8	(0)

International career
2020	Belgium U15	2	(0)
2022	Belgium U17	5	(3)
2022–2023	Belgium U18	6	(1)
- * Club domestic league appearances and goals as of 07:08, 13 November 2024 (UTC)

Enock Atta Agyei (born 13 January 2005) is a Belgian professional footballer who plays as a winger for English EFL Championship club Burnley.

== Club career ==
Agyei started his career with RSC Verviers before joining Anderlecht in 2015. On 14 August 2022, he made his professional debut in the Challenger Pro League for Anderlecht's reserve side RSCA Futures. On 31 January 2023, he joined Championship side Burnley on a four-and-a-half-year deal and was subsequently loaned out to Mechelen.

== International career ==
Agyei has represented Belgium at youth international level up to the under-18 level.

== Personal life ==
Agyei was born in Belgium to Ghanaian parents.

== Career statistics ==
As of match played 10 November 2024

Appearances and goals by club, season and competition
Club	Season	League			National cup (Note: Includes Belgian Cup)		League cup		Other		Total	
Club	Season	Division	Apps	Goals	Apps	Goals	Apps	Goals	Apps	Goals	Apps	Goals
RSCA Futures	2022–23	Challenger Pro League	17	3	—		—		—		17	3
Mechelen (loan)	2022–23	Belgian Pro League	8	0	1	0	—		—		9	0
Burnley	2024–25	Championship	3	0	0	0	0	0	—		3	0
Career total			28	3	1	0	0	0	—		29	3
