= Burnley F.C. =

Association football club in England

Burnley
- Full name: Burnley Football Club
- Nickname: The Clarets
- Founded: 18 May 1882; 144 years ago
- Ground: Turf Moor
- Capacity: 21,944
- Owner: ALK Capital LLC
- Chairman: Alan Pace
- Head coach: Fabio Celestini
- League: EFL Championship
- 2025–26: Premier League, 19th of 20 (relegated)
- Website: burnleyfootballclub.com
Home colours	Away colours	Third colours

Burnley Football Club (/ˈbɜːrnli/) is a professional football club based in Burnley, Lancashire, England. The team compete in the EFL Championship, the second tier of English football, following relegation from the Premier League in the 2025–26 season. Founded in 1882, Burnley were one of the first to become professional (in 1883) and subsequently put pressure on the Football Association to permit payments to players. They entered the FA Cup for the first time in 1885–86 and were one of the 12 founder members of the Football League in 1888–89, the world's first league football competition.

Burnley are one of only five sides to have won all four professional divisions of English football, and have twice been crowned champions of England, in 1920–21 and 1959–60. They have won the FA Cup once, in 1913–14, and have won the FA Charity Shield twice, in 1960 and 1973. The team have also finished as runners-up in both the First Division and FA Cup on two occasions. During the 1920–21 campaign, Burnley embarked on a 30-match unbeaten league run, setting an English record. (Note: It stood as the longest stretch without defeat in a single English professional league season until Arsenal bettered it in 2003–04.) From the 1950s until the 1970s, under chairman Bob Lord, Burnley were renowned for their youth policy and scouting system, and were one of the first to set up a purpose-built training ground. The majority of the team that won the 1959–60 league title had progressed through the club's youth academy. At the time, Burnley—with a population of 80,000—became one of the smallest towns to produce an English first-tier champion. (Note: Burnley's population had reduced by around 20 per cent since the club last won the First Division in 1921.)

The team have played home games at Turf Moor since 1883, after they had moved from their original premises at Calder Vale. Nicknamed "the Clarets", the club colours of claret and blue were adopted in 1910. The club's current emblem is based on the town of Burnley's coat of arms. The side have a long-standing rivalry with nearby club Blackburn Rovers, with whom they contest the East Lancashire Derby. Burnley's record appearance holder is Jerry Dawson, who made 569 appearances in a 22-year playing spell with the team, and their record goalscorer is George Beel with 188 goals.

== History ==
=== Beginnings and the first major honours (1882–1946) ===
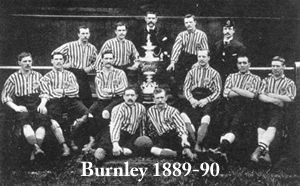
One of the earliest photographed Burnley sides, with the Lancashire Cup in the middle of the photo

The club was founded on 18 May 1882 by members of rugby team Burnley Rovers, (Note: The Burnley Advertiser reported on 26 September 1874 that a rugby football team named "The Burnley Rovers Football Club" had "just been formed", already having 35 members.) who voted for a shift to association football as the sport was gaining prominence in the area. The suffix "Rovers" was dropped a few days later. The side won their first silverware in 1883: the Dr Dean's Cup, a knockout competition between amateur clubs in the Burnley area. By the end of the year, the club turned professional and signed many Scottish players, who were regarded as the best footballers by the Burnley committee. As a result, Burnley refused to join the Football Association (FA) and its FA Cup because the association barred professional players. In 1884, Burnley led a group of 35 other clubs in the formation of the breakaway British Football Association (BFA) to challenge the FA's supremacy. The FA changed its rule in 1885, allowing professionalism, and Burnley made their first appearance in the FA Cup in 1885–86. In October 1886, Burnley's Turf Moor became the first professional ground to be visited by a member of the royal family, when Prince Albert Victor attended a friendly between Burnley and Bolton Wanderers. The club was among the twelve founders of the Football League in 1888–89, the world's first league football competition, and one of the six based in Lancashire. In the second match, William Tait became the first player in history to score a league hat-trick, with his three goals against Bolton Wanderers securing Burnley's inaugural win in the competition. In 1889–90, they claimed their first Lancashire Cup, after beating local rivals Blackburn Rovers in the final.

Burnley usually finished in mid-table during the early seasons of the Football League, before being relegated to the Second Division in 1896–97. The team won the division the next season; they lost only two of thirty matches before gaining promotion through a four-team play-off series called test matches, although the last game against First Division club Stoke was controversial. It finished 0–0 as both needed only a draw for a top flight place, and it was later named "[t]he match without a shot at goal". Burnley finished third in 1898–99, their then-highest league finish, before being relegated again in 1899–1900; the club also became embroiled in controversy when goalkeeper Jack Hillman attempted to bribe opponents Nottingham Forest during the final match of the season, which resulted in his suspension for the entire following campaign. It is possibly the earliest recorded case of match fixing in football. The side continued to play in the Second Division and even finished in bottom place in 1902–03—but were re-elected—as the club got into financial difficulties.

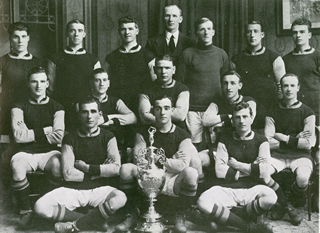
Team photograph of the Championship-winning side of the 1920–21 season

Harry Windle was named chairman in 1909, under whom the club's finances improved. In 1910, the Burnley directors changed the club's colours from green to claret and blue, and appointed John Haworth as the team's new manager. In 1912–13, the side won promotion to the first tier, and the following season, Burnley won their first major honour, beating Liverpool in the 1914 FA Cup final. Bert Freeman scored the only goal as Burnley became the first club to defeat five top tier sides in one cup season. Tommy Boyle became the first captain to receive the trophy from a reigning monarch, King George V. The team finished second to West Bromwich Albion in 1919–20, before winning their first ever First Division championship in 1920–21. Burnley lost the opening three games but went unbeaten in the following 30 league matches, setting an English record. Nine seasons later, the team were relegated to the Second Division. They struggled in the second tier and avoided a further relegation in 1931–32 by two points. The years through to the outbreak of the Second World War were characterised by mid-table league finishes.

=== Progressive and golden era (1946–1976) ===
In 1946–47, the first season of post-war League football, Burnley won promotion to the First Division and reached the FA Cup final, in which they were defeated by Charlton Athletic after extra time. The team's defence was nicknamed "The Iron Curtain", since they conceded only 29 goals in 42 league matches. Alan Brown, captain of Burnley's 1946–47 side, was appointed the club's manager in 1954, with Bob Lord becoming chairman a year later. The club became one of the most progressive around under their tenures. Burnley were one of the first to set up a purpose-built training ground, at Gawthorpe, and they became renowned for their youth policy and scouting system, which yielded many young talents. In 1958, former Burnley player Harry Potts was appointed manager. His squad mainly revolved around the duo of captain Jimmy Adamson and Jimmy McIlroy, the team's playmaker. Potts often employed the then unfashionable 4–4–2 formation and he implemented a Total Football playing style.

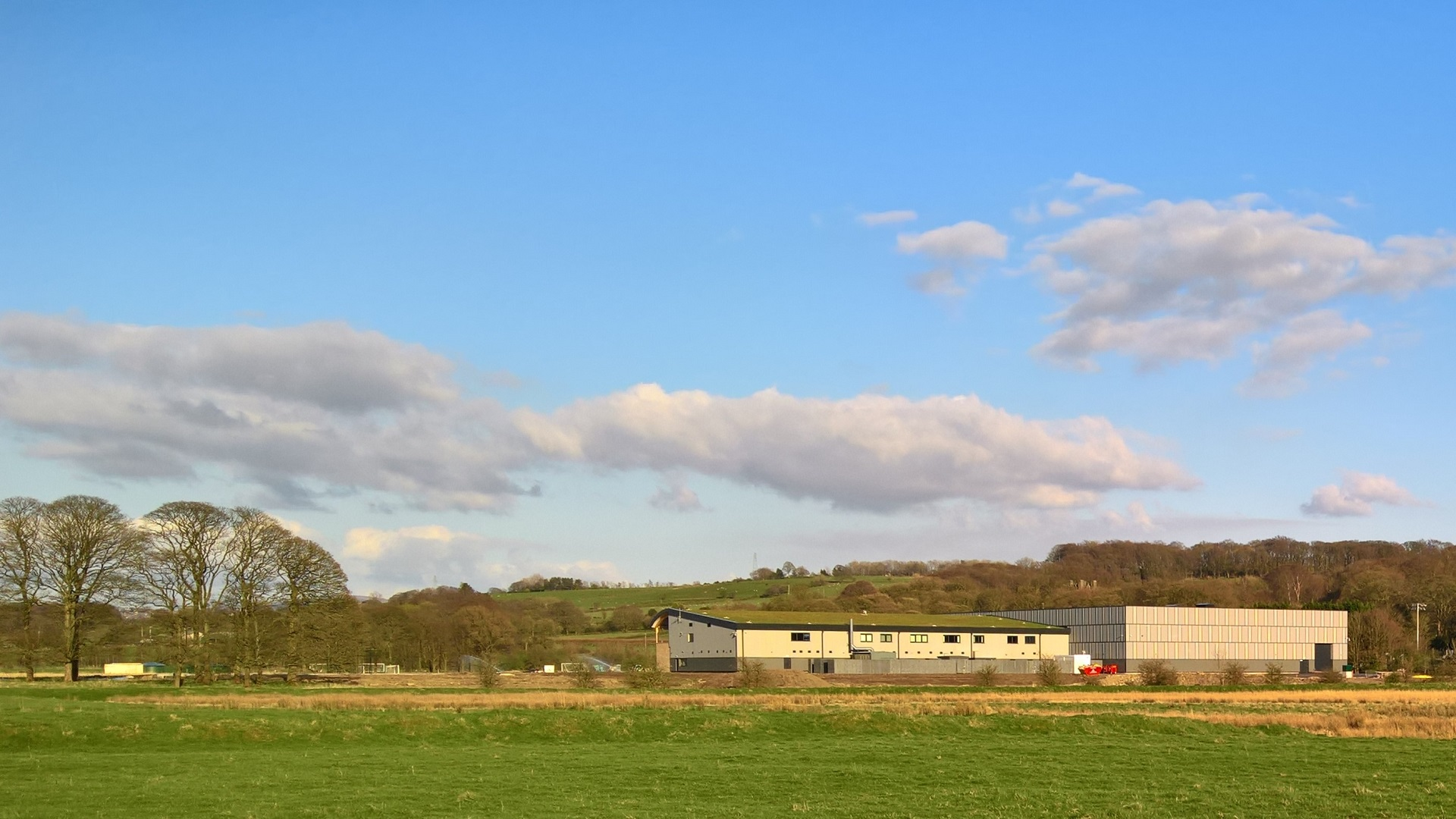
Gawthorpe (2017 photograph) was one of the first purpose-built training grounds.

Burnley clinched a second First Division title in 1959–60. They had not topped the table until the last match was played out. (Note: Burnley topped the league table between 25 and 26 August 1959 after their second game but fell down to third place after the other teams completed their second fixtures.) The squad cost only £13,000 (equivalent to £260,000 in 2025 (Note: UK Consumer Price Index inflation figures from 1209–2024 based on data from "Inflation calculator". Bank of England. London. 18 February 2026.)) in transfer fees—£8,000 on McIlroy in 1950 and £5,000 on left-back Alex Elder in 1959. The other Burnley players had progressed through the club's youth academy. With 80,000 inhabitants, the town of Burnley became one of the smallest to have an English first tier champion. The side travelled to the United States after the season ended to represent England in the International Soccer League, the first modern international American soccer tournament. The following season, Burnley played in European competition for the first time in the 1960–61 European Cup. They defeated former finalists Reims in the first round, but went out against Hamburger SV in the quarter-finals. The team finished the 1961–62 First Division as runners-up to newcomers Ipswich Town after winning only one of the last ten matches, and had a run to the 1962 FA Cup final but lost against Tottenham Hotspur. Adamson was named FWA Footballer of the Year, however, with McIlroy as runner-up.

The maximum wage in the Football League was abolished in 1961, which meant that clubs from small towns like Burnley could no longer compete financially with sides from larger settlements. The controversial departure of McIlroy to Stoke City in 1963 (Note: McIlroy was sold to Stoke City during the 1962–63 campaign for a fee of £25,000, after he was placed on the transfer list. This caused outrage among the Burnley fans, and some never returned to Turf Moor. In 1999, McIlroy stated that his friendship with Reg Cooke, a director at Burnley and rival of chairman Bob Lord, might have led to his sale by Lord.) and Adamson's retirement in 1964 also damaged the club's fortunes. Burnley retained their place in the First Division throughout the decade, however, finishing third in both the 1962–63 and 1965–66 seasons, and qualifying for the 1966–67 Inter-Cities Fairs Cup. Potts was replaced by Adamson as manager in 1970. Adamson hailed his squad as the "Team of the Seventies", but he was unable to halt the slide as relegation followed in 1970–71. Burnley won the Second Division title in 1972–73, and were invited to play in the 1973 FA Charity Shield, (Note: The 1972–73 First Division champions Liverpool and the 1972–73 FA Cup winners Sunderland declined to compete in the 1973 FA Charity Shield, so Manchester City—the reigning holders of the Shield—and Second Division champions Burnley played instead.) where they emerged as winners against Manchester City. In 1975, the team were victims of one of the great FA Cup shocks of all time when Wimbledon, then in the Southern League, won 1–0 at Turf Moor. Adamson left the club in January 1976, and relegation from the First Division followed later that year. During this period, a drop in home attendances combined with an enlarged debt forced Burnley to sell star players such as Martin Dobson and Leighton James, which caused a rapid decline.

=== Near oblivion, recovery, and back in the top flight (1976–2020) ===
Graph showing Burnley's performance from the inaugural season of the Football League in 1888–89 to the present

The team were relegated to the Third Division for the first time in 1979–80. Under the management of former Burnley player Brian Miller, they returned to the second tier as champions in 1981–82. However, this return was short-lived and lasted only one year. Managerial changes continued to be made in a search for success; Miller was replaced by Frank Casper in early 1983, he by John Bond before the 1983–84 season and Bond himself by John Benson a season later. Bond was the first manager since Frank Hill (1948–1954) without a previous playing career at the club. He was criticised by the fans for signing expensive players increasing Burnley's debt, and for selling the young talents Lee Dixon, Brian Laws and Trevor Steven. Benson was in charge when Burnley were relegated to the Fourth Division for the first time at the end of the 1984–85 season. The team avoided relegation to the Football Conference, the highest level of non-League football, on the last day in 1986–87, after they won against Orient and their rivals drew or lost.

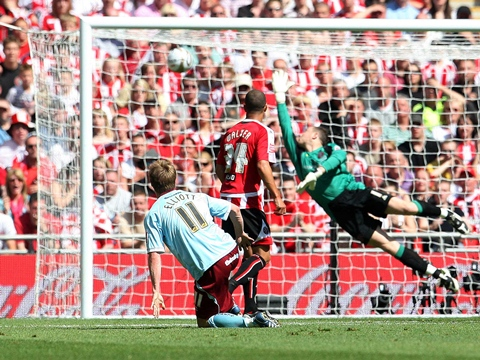
Wade Elliott's goal earned Burnley a 1–0 victory over Sheffield United in the 2009 Championship play-off final.

In 1988, Burnley played Wolverhampton Wanderers in the final of the Associate Members' Cup but lost 2–0. The match was attended by 80,000 people, a record for a match between two sides from the fourth tier. The team won the Fourth Division in 1991–92 under manager Jimmy Mullen. He had succeeded Casper in October 1991 and won his first nine league matches as manager. By winning the fourth tier, Burnley became only the second club to win all four professional divisions of English football, after Wolverhampton Wanderers. Burnley won the Second Division play-offs in 1993–94 and gained promotion to the second tier. Relegation followed after one season, and in 1997–98 only a last-day victory over Plymouth Argyle prevented relegation back into the fourth tier. Under manager Stan Ternent, Burnley finished second in 1999–2000 and won promotion to the second tier. In early 2002, financial problems caused by the collapse of ITV Digital brought the club close to administration. Ternent was sacked in 2004, after he avoided relegation with a squad composed of several loaned players and some players who were not entirely fit. The 2008–09 campaign, with Owen Coyle in charge, ended with promotion to the Premier League. Sheffield United were defeated in the Championship play-off final, which meant a return to the top flight after 33 years. Burnley also reached the semi-final of the League Cup for the first time in over 25 years but were beaten on aggregate by Tottenham in the last minutes of the second leg.

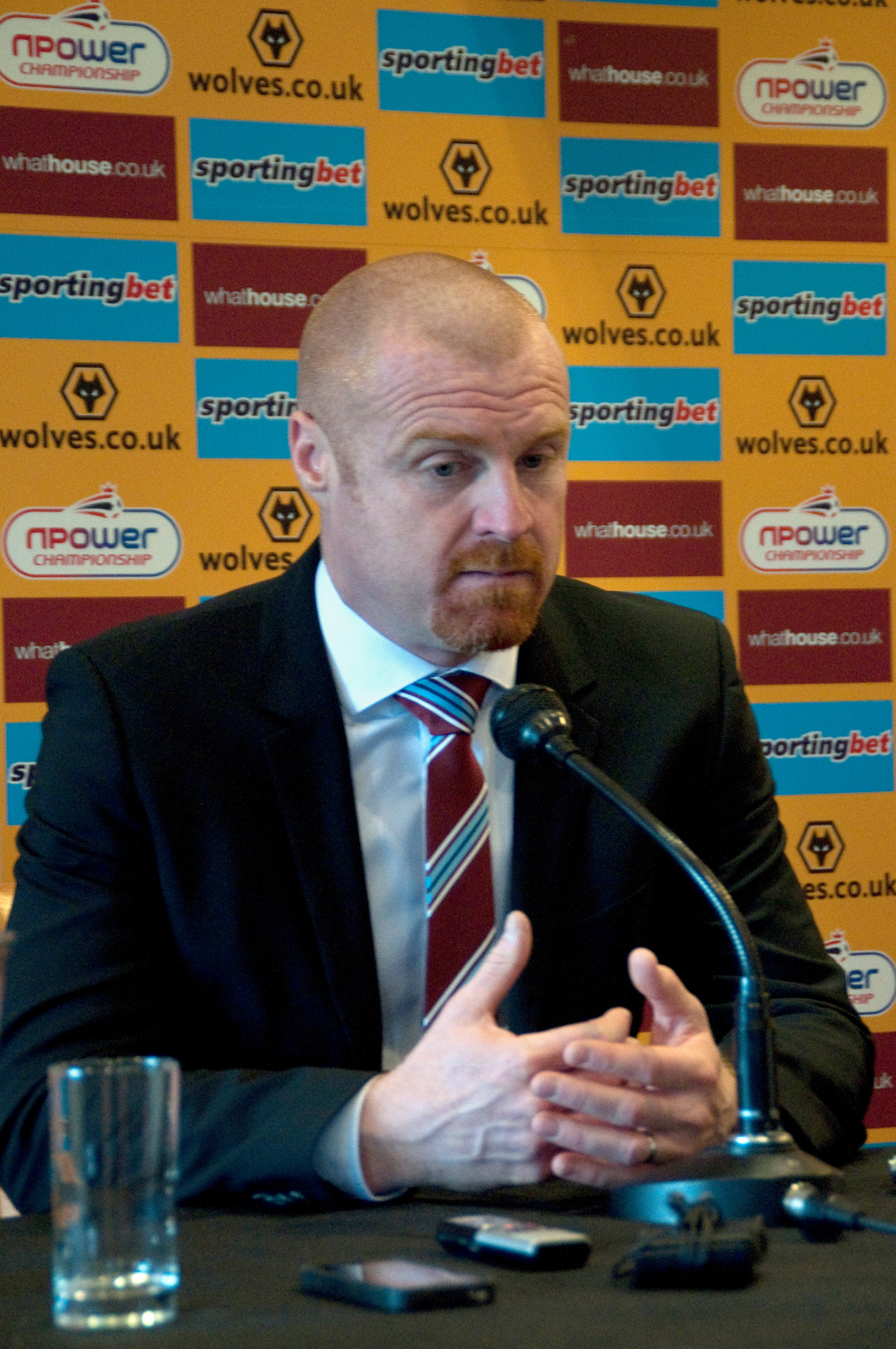
Manager Sean Dyche guided Burnley to two promotions to the Premier League.

Promotion made the town of Burnley one of the smallest to host a Premier League club. The team started the season well and became the first newly promoted side in the competition to win their first four home games. However, Coyle left the club in January 2010 to manage local rivals Bolton Wanderers. He was replaced by former Burnley player Brian Laws, but the team's form plummeted and they were relegated after a single season. Sean Dyche was appointed manager in October 2012. In his first full season in charge, Dyche guided Burnley back to the Premier League in 2013–14 on a tight budget and with a small squad. The team went down after one season but won the Championship title on their return in 2015–16, ending the season with a run of 23 league games undefeated. In 2017, the club completed construction of Barnfield Training Centre—the replacement of Gawthorpe—with Dyche being involved in the training ground's design. Burnley finished seventh in the 2017–18 Premier League, which meant qualification for the 2018–19 UEFA Europa League and a return to European football after 51 years. The team failed to reach the group stage as they were eliminated in the play-off round by Greek club Olympiacos.

=== Foreign owners (2020–present) ===
In December 2020, American investment company ALK Capital acquired an 84% stake in Burnley for £170 million through a leveraged takeover, with Alan Pace becoming the club's new chairman. It was the first time the club was run by anyone other than local businessmen and Burnley supporters. Dyche was sacked during 2021–22, and Burnley were relegated to the Championship at the end of the campaign after they lost on the final day and finished in 18th place. (Note: Burnley later argued that Everton, one of the clubs involved in the relegation battle, had deprived them of a realistic chance of staying up through breaches of the Premier League's Profitability and Sustainability Rules. The club succeeded in a legal claim against Everton in 2026, receiving nearly £40 million in compensation and interest in what is believed to be the first decision of its kind.) It ended a six-season spell in the top flight, the club's longest since the 1960s and early 1970s. In June 2022, the 36-year-old Belgian Vincent Kompany was appointed Burnley's manager, becoming the first person from outside the British Isles to manage the club. During his first months in charge, he rebuilt the squad on a budget, signing mostly young and foreign players. Kompany also implemented a possession-based, attacking style of play. Burnley secured promotion back to the Premier League in 2022–23 with seven matches remaining—a Championship record—before winning the Championship title following a 1–0 victory at local rivals Blackburn Rovers. The following season, Burnley were relegated again from the Premier League, finishing 19th. Shortly afterwards, however, Kompany went to Bayern Munich for a fee of £10.2 million, which made him one of the most expensive managers in history.

Burnley won promotion back to the top flight at the first attempt under Scott Parker, ending the 2024–25 season with a club record 33-match unbeaten run. The team conceded only 16 goals in 46 matches—an average of 0.35 per game—setting the best defensive record in English league history, among several other national records. (Note: Burnley kept a record 30 clean sheets, never conceded more than one goal in any fixture, and became the first side to twice reach a three-figure points total in the same division (101 points in 2022–23 and 100 in 2024–25).) Despite this, they finished second behind Leeds United on goal difference, becoming the first team in Football League history to earn 100 points without winning the title. The next season, Burnley went down to the second tier again, with Parker departing shortly before the end of the campaign. The team finished with a club record low tally of 22 points and recorded only four wins.

== Kits and colours ==
Burnley's strip in the inaugural season of the Football League (1888–89). The actual kit had long sleeves.

In the early decades, Burnley used a variety of home kit designs and colours. During the first eight years, they used various permutations of blue and white, the colours of their forerunners Burnley Rovers. Before the start of the 1890–91 season, the club adopted an all-blue shirt, but changed it to all-white mid-season. After spells in amber and black, and amber and claret, Burnley wore pink and white striped shirts during 1894–95, before reverting to amber and black. In the late 1890s, the club used an all-red shirt and from 1900 until 1910 it wore an all-green jersey. In 1910, Burnley changed their colours to claret and blue, (Note: Aston Villa are believed to have been the first team to adopt claret and blue, doing so in 1888. Burnley may have been inspired by Villa, who were the reigning Football League champions, although contemporary newspapers such as the Burnley Express only noted a similarity in colours rather than a direct influence.) which they have had for most of their history, save for a spell in white shirts during the second half of the 1930s and the Second World War. The club re-registered its colours as claret and blue in 1946, following a successful appeal in the Burnley Express that brought in enough donated coupons from supporters to obtain a new kit. The change in colours also contributed to the emergence of Burnley's nickname, "the Clarets". In earlier decades, the side had been referred to by monikers such as "the Turfites", "the Moorites", "the Royalites" and "the Brunsiders".

Burnley's kits have been supplied by various manufacturers since 1975, when Umbro produced the club's jerseys, and have featured shirt sponsors since 1982. (Note: At the start of the 2000–01 season, a planned sponsorship deal with Time Computers fell through, leaving Burnley without a shirt sponsor for the entire campaign. During the final few matches of the season, the team wore shirts displaying the club's website address.) The first sponsor's name to appear on Burnley shirts was that of Poco Homes, a Manchester-based building firm, which featured from 1982 to 1983. The club's longest-running shirt sponsorship was with Endsleigh Insurance, lasting from 1988 to 1998. In 2017, the club secured its first sleeve sponsorship deal, with the logo of the mobile game Golf Clash—a title developed by Playdemic—appearing on the left sleeve of the Burnley shirts.

The club's current front-of-shirt sponsor is the automotive retailer Vertu, which took up the role for the 2026–27 season.

== Crest ==
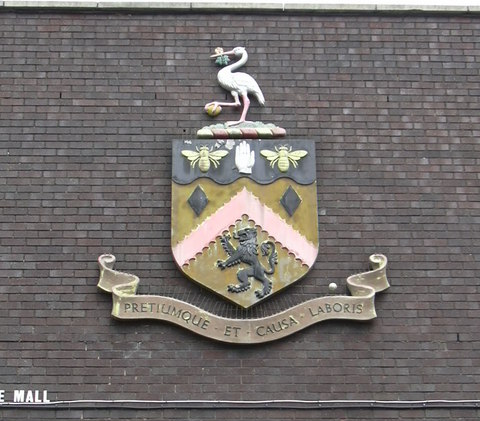
The town of Burnley's coat of arms formed the foundation for the club's current crest.

Burnley's jerseys first sported a crest in December 1887, when the team wore white shirts with a blue sash featuring the coat of arms of the Prince of Wales, commemorating Prince Albert Victor's visit to Turf Moor the previous year—the first by a member of the royal family to a professional football ground. The royal arms were worn regularly until the 1894–95 season, but reappeared for the 1914 FA Cup final, attended by King George V. During the 1934–35 FA Cup semi-final, the town of Burnley's coat of arms featured on the club's shirts for the first time. It returned for the 1947 FA Cup final, and the town's arms became a permanent feature on Burnley's jerseys for nearly a decade following their 1959–60 First Division title win. From 1969 to 1979 on home kits, and until 1976 on away shirts, the team wore a stylised "BFC" cypher.

In 1972, Burnley's commercial manager Jack Butterfield announced the club's intention to introduce a badge that could be copyrighted, prompting a public design competition, which was won by Mr Jolleys of Ashton-on-Ribble. His design featured two lions, two red roses, a bee, a shuttle, a knight's helmet and a hand. The resulting crest was officially adopted by the club in 1973, and first appeared on Burnley's away kits at the start of the 1976–77 season, before being introduced on the home shirts in 1979. It was replaced on the jerseys in 1983 by a simple white "B.F.C." cypher, but reinstated in 1987.

In 2009, to mark the 50th anniversary of the 1959–60 title, the club reintroduced the town's arms used during the 1960s, replacing its Latin motto "Pretiumque et Causa Laboris" (lit. 'The prize and the cause of [our] labour') with the inscription "Burnley Football Club" the following year. In 2023, the crest's elements were rendered in white and placed on a claret shield, and appeared on the home kit from the 2024–25 season.

The club's current badge is based on the town of Burnley's coat of arms. The stork at the top of the crest refers to the Starkie family, who were prominent in the Burnley area. In its mouth it holds a Lacy knot of the de Lacy family, who held Burnley in the Middle Ages. The stork stands on a hill and cotton plants, which represents the town's cotton heritage. The hand below symbolises the town's motto "Hold to the Truth", derived from the Towneley family. The two bees reflect the town's hard work ethic, the lion represents royalty, and the chevron symbolises the River Brun, which runs through Burnley.

== Stadium ==
The team have played their home games at Turf Moor since February 1883, which replaced their original premises at Calder Vale. The Turf Moor site has been used for sport since at least 1843, when Burnley Cricket Club moved to the area. In 1883, they invited Burnley to a field adjacent to the cricket pitch. Both clubs have remained there since, and only Lancashire rivals Preston North End have continuously occupied their stadium for longer.

The ground originally consisted of only a pitch and the initial grandstand was not built until 1885. In 1888, the first league match at Turf Moor saw Burnley emerge as 4–1 winners over Bolton Wanderers, Fred Poland netting the first league goal at the stadium. Turf Moor's capacity was increased to 50,000 under the chairman Harry Windle during the 1910s. The ground hosted its only FA Cup semi-final in 1922, between Huddersfield Town and Notts County, and five years later it hosted its only full international match, between England and Wales for the British Home Championship. From the mid-1940s until the mid-1960s, crowds in the stadium averaged in the 20,000–35,000 range, and Burnley averaged a club-record attendance of 33,621 in the 1947–48 First Division. The attendance record for a single match was already set in 1924 against Huddersfield Town in an FA Cup third round tie, when 54,775 spectators attended. In 1960, in an FA Cup fifth round replay game against Bradford City, there was an official attendance of 52,850. Some of the gates were broken down, however, and many uncounted fans poured into the ground.

Turf Moor's field had a slope until 1974, when the pitch was raised to minimise it. During the mid-1990s, the ground underwent further refurbishment when the Longside and Bee Hole End terraces were replaced by all-seater stands following the recommendations of the Taylor Report. In 2019, the club built two corner stands for disabled home supporters between the Jimmy McIlroy and both the North and Bob Lord Stands to meet the Accessible Stadium Guide regulations. Turf Moor currently has a capacity of 21,944 and consists of four stands: the North Stand (formerly the Longside), the Jimmy McIlroy Stand (formerly the Bee Hole End), the Bob Lord Stand, and the Cricket Field Stand for home and away fans.

During a pre-season friendly against Italian side Lazio at Turf Moor in August 2025, Burnley became the first football club in history to live stream a game in immersive virtual reality. (Note: The broadcast, developed by club partner Rezzil, offered viewers a virtual seat inside the ground with a panoramic view of the pitch, live commentary, ambient crowd noise, and real-time visuals including club branding and player kits.)

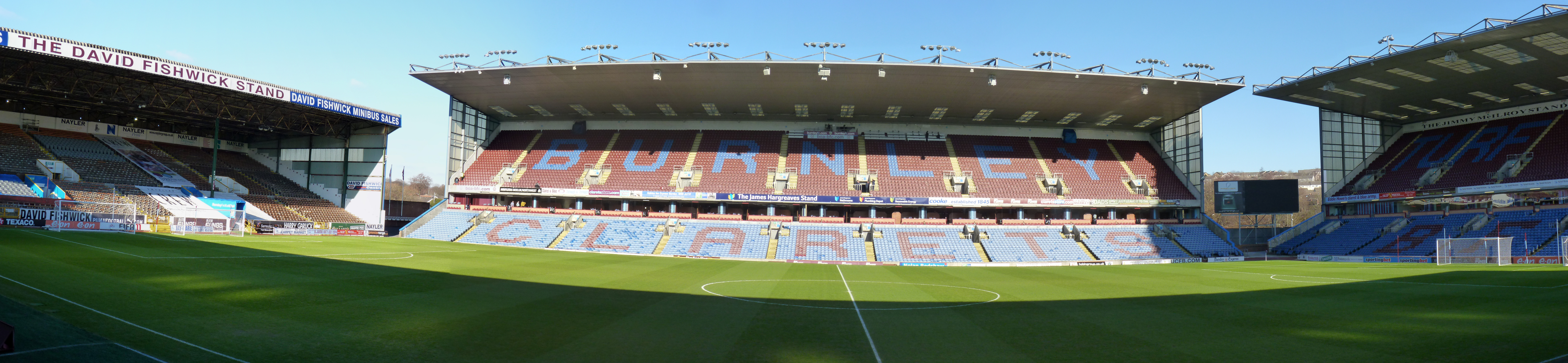
Panorama of Turf Moor (2011), looking north from the Bob Lord Stand, with the Cricket Field Stand to the left, the North Stand opposite and the Jimmy McIlroy Stand to the right

== Supporters and rivalries ==
=== Supporters ===
Burnley's supporters are mainly drawn from East Lancashire and West Yorkshire. The club is one of the best supported in English football per capita, with average attendances of around 21,000 in the Premier League in a town of approximately 78,000 inhabitants (2021 census). Burnley's first supporters' club was formed in early 1932, and since then, numerous supporters' groups have been established across the United Kingdom and overseas. The club's fans have had a long-standing friendship with supporters of the Dutch team Helmond Sport since the 1990s, and several Burnley and Helmond fans regularly make an overseas journey to visit each other's matches. For 2022–23 and 2023–24, Helmond Sport adopted a claret and blue away kit in tribute to Burnley.

A frequently sung chant since the early 1970s is "No Nay Never", an adaptation of the song "The Wild Rover", which has lyrics to offend main rivals Blackburn Rovers. In the early 1980s, a hooligan firm known as the Suicide Squad emerged from within Burnley's fanbase. The group later featured on the 2006 hooligan documentary series The Real Football Factories. In 2011, 12 members were sentenced to jail for a total of 32 years, after a high-profile incident with Blackburn Rovers supporters in 2009.

Notable Burnley fans have included football pioneer Jimmy Hogan, who was a regular attendee at Turf Moor; journalist Alastair Campbell, who has been regularly involved in events with the club; and cricketer James Anderson, who also worked in Burnley's ticket office on a part-time basis. King Charles III is also a supporter of the club, as is the South African cardinal Wilfrid Napier. In 2019, Burnley fan Scott Cunliffe was honoured by the UEFA with the #EqualGame award "for his work as a role model highlighting diversity, inclusion and accessibility in football"; he ran to every away Premier League ground during Burnley's 2018–19 campaign and raised more than £55,000 for Premier League clubs' community trusts and community projects in Burnley.

A popular drink served at home matches since the First World War is "Béné & Hot"—the French liqueur Bénédictine topped up with hot water. The East Lancashire Regiment soldiers acquired a taste for the drink while stationed at the birthplace of the beverage in Fécamp, Normandy, during the war. They drank it with hot water to keep warm in the trenches, and the surviving soldiers later returned to the East Lancashire area with the liqueur. In excess of 30 bottles are sold at each home game, which makes the club one of the world's biggest sellers of Bénédictine; Turf Moor is the only British football ground to sell it.

=== Rivalries ===
Association football was first played in Burnley in the early 1880s, and by 1883 the town already had more than 20 clubs. One of Burnley's earliest rivals were Burnley Union Star, based in the north of the town. While Burnley drew support from across the area and were described as the town's "premier club", Union Star were regarded as one of the most prominent local teams. Their rivalry peaked during the 1886–87 Lancashire Cup, when a first-round fixture between the two sides ended 2–2. A replay was not held, as the Stars were expelled from the competition after a complaint by Burnley to the Lancashire FA over the use of an unregistered player; they were also suspended for one month. The incident deepened tensions, with the Football Field newspaper writing that "a certain section of the Union Star supporters seem to be possessed of the very essence of rudeness when viewing matches at Turf Moor". Union Star disbanded in 1891, and Burnley soon bought the "Star Stand" from their ground, relocating it to Turf Moor. Burnley remained unbeaten in ten meetings with the side, winning eight. Another early rival were Padiham, with one fixture in 1884 attracting a then record crowd of 12,000 at Turf Moor.

Burnley's main rivals are Blackburn Rovers, with whom they contest the East Lancashire derby, named after the region both clubs hail from. Games between these sides from mill towns are also known under the name "Cotton Mills derby". Both are founder members of the Football League and have won the First Division and the FA Cup. The two clubs are separated by only 14 miles (23 km) and besides the geographical proximity, they also have a long-standing history of rivalry; the earliest competitive clash was a Football League match in 1888. Four years earlier, however, they had met for the first time in a friendly, "with considerable pride at stake". Burnley hold the better head-to-head record, as the side have won 45 games to Blackburn's 41. Burnley's closest geographic rivals are actually Accrington Stanley, but as they have never competed at the same level—although defunct club Accrington did—there is no significant rivalry between them.

Other rivalries include those with nearby clubs Blackpool, Bolton Wanderers and Preston North End. Burnley also share a Roses rivalry with West Yorkshire sides Bradford City and Leeds United. The team contested heated matches with Halifax Town, Plymouth Argyle, Rochdale and Stockport County in the 1980s and 1990s during their time in the lower leagues, although feelings of animosity were mainly one-sided; according to the 2003 Football Fans Census, both Halifax and Stockport supporters regarded Burnley as their main rival, whereas Burnley fans did not include either club among their top three rivals.

== Players ==
=== First-team squad ===
As of 6 September 2026

Note: Flags indicate national team as defined under FIFA eligibility rules; some limited exceptions apply. Players may hold more than one non-FIFA nationality.

No.	Pos.	Nation	Player
1	GK	GER	Max Weiß
2	DF	ENG	Kyle Walker (vice-captain)
3	DF	ENG	Max Alleyne (on loan from Manchester City)
5	MF	JPN	Reo Hatate
7	FW	DEN	Jacob Bruun Larsen
8	MF	FRA	Ugo Raghouber
9	FW	ENG	Jamie Vardy
10	FW	CYP	Marcus Edwards
11	FW	SUI	Zeki Amdouni
12	FW	KAZ	Dastan Satpayev (on loan from Chelsea)
14	DF	WAL	Connor Roberts
15	DF	BIH	Anel Ahmedhodžić
17	FW	BEN	Andréas Hountondji
18	DF	SWE	Hjalmar Ekdal

No.	Pos.	Nation	Player
19	FW	BEL	Largie Ramazani (on loan from Leeds United)
21	MF	ENG	Aaron Ramsey
22	DF	PER	Oliver Sonne
23	DF	BRA	Lucas Pires
24	MF	IRL	Josh Cullen (captain)
27	FW	ALB	Armando Broja
28	MF	TUN	Hannibal Mejbri
29	MF	ENG	Josh Laurent
30	FW	ESP	Lluc Castell
34	FW	NED	Jaydon Banel
37	GK	FRA	Grégoire Coudert
44	DF	BRA	Igor Julio
48	FW	BEL	Enock Agyei

Omitted from 25-man squad

Note: Flags indicate national team as defined under FIFA eligibility rules; some limited exceptions apply. Players may hold more than one non-FIFA nationality.

No.	Pos.	Nation	Player
6	DF	ENG	Bashir Humphreys
13	GK	ENG	Ben Amos
20	DF	CUW	Shurandy Sambo

No.	Pos.	Nation	Player
31	MF	BEL	Mike Trésor
35	FW	ENG	Ashley Barnes
45	FW	IRL	Michael Obafemi

Out on loan

Note: Flags indicate national team as defined under FIFA eligibility rules; some limited exceptions apply. Players may hold more than one non-FIFA nationality.

No.	Pos.	Nation	Player
—	DF	NED	Quilindschy Hartman (at Espanyol until 30 June 2027)
—	MF	FRA	Lesley Ugochukwu (at Galatasaray until 30 June 2027)

No.	Pos.	Nation	Player
—	FW	AUT	Oluwaseun Adewumi (at Hertha BSC until 30 June 2027)
—	FW	RSA	Lyle Foster (at Houston Dynamo until 30 June 2027)

== Management ==
=== Coaching staff ===
- Head coach: Fabio Celestini
- Assistant coaches: Manel Expósito • Mike Jackson • Henrik Jensen
- First-team coach: Jack Cork
- Goalkeeping coach: Kersten Kuhl
- Fitness coach: Carlos Menéndez

=== Managers ===
Burnley-born Harry Bradshaw was Burnley's first manager—he was appointed in August 1894—and was the first to win a league title with the club, taking them to the top of the Second Division at the end of the 1897–98 season. John Haworth was the first manager in the club's history to win a major honour, the FA Cup in 1914; under Haworth, Burnley also became champions of England for the first time in 1920–21. Harry Potts led the club to its second First Division title during the 1959–60 campaign. Jimmy Adamson (1972–73 Second Division), Brian Miller (1981–82 Third Division), Jimmy Mullen (1991–92 Fourth Division), Sean Dyche (2015–16 Championship), and Vincent Kompany (2022–23 Championship) also led Burnley to league titles.

=== Owners ===
In 1897, the club incorporated as a limited company. From their establishment until 2020, Burnley were run by local businessmen and supporters. In December 2020, Velocity Sports Partners, the sports investment arm of American management firm ALK Capital, acquired an 84% stake in Burnley for £170 million. Alan Pace, managing partner of ALK Capital, subsequently replaced Mike Garlick as the club's chairman. ALK borrowed much of the takeover money, and the loan debts were transferred to the club. As a result of this leveraged takeover, Burnley went from being debt-free to being saddled with debts of around £100 million, at interest rates of about eight per cent. ALK's and Pace's lack of transparency, the club's declining fortunes on the pitch and its substantial debt have prompted protests by supporters against the club's ownership.

In May 2023, J. J. Watt, a retired defensive end in American football's National Football League, and his wife, former United States women's national soccer team international Kealia Watt, were announced as new minority investors. YouTube group Dude Perfect also became minority investors in the club later that year. In July 2025, ALK Capital, through investment arm Velocity Sport Limited, acquired a majority stake in Spanish side Espanyol, bringing Burnley into a multi-club ownership model.

=== Board of directors ===
- Chairman: Alan Pace
- Directors: Dave Checketts • Stuart Hunt • Mike Smith

=== Chairmen ===
The following have been chairman of the club's board of directors:

- 1882–1883: Albert Jobling
- 1883–1885: John Rawcliffe
- 1885–1887: John Bradley
- 1887–1896: Wyatt Granger
- 1896–1899: Charles Sutcliffe
- 1899–1909: Edwin Whitehead
- 1909–1930: Harry Windle
- 1930–1932: William Bracewell
- 1932–1934: Edward Tate
- 1934–1948: Tom Clegg
- 1948–1952: Ernest Kay
- 1952–1955: Wilfred Hopkinson
- 1955–1981: Bob Lord
- 1981–1985: John Jackson
- 1985–1998: Frank Teasdale
- 1998–2012: Barry Kilby
- 2012–2015: John Banaszkiewicz and Mike Garlick (co-chairmen)
- 2015–2020: Mike Garlick
- 2020–present: Alan Pace

== Honours ==
Burnley were the second, and are one of only five teams to have won all four professional divisions of English football, along with Wolverhampton Wanderers, Preston North End, Sheffield United and Portsmouth. The club's honours include the following:

League

- First Division (level 1) (Note: Upon its formation in 1992, the Premier League became the top tier of English football; the Football League First, Second and Third Divisions then became the second, third and fourth tiers, respectively. From 2004, the First Division became the Championship, the Second Division became League One and the Third Division became League Two.)
  - Champions: 1920–21, 1959–60
  - Runners-up: 1919–20, 1961–62
- Second Division / Championship (level 2)
  - Champions: 1897–98, 1972–73, 2015–16, 2022–23
  - Promoted: 1912–13, 1946–47, 2013–14, 2024–25
  - Play-off winners: 2009
- Third Division / Second Division (level 3)
  - Champions: 1981–82
  - Promoted: 1999–2000
  - Play-off winners: 1994
- Fourth Division (level 4)
  - Champions: 1991–92

Cup

- FA Cup
  - Winners: 1913–14
  - Runners-up: 1946–47, 1961–62
- FA Charity Shield
  - Winners: 1960 (shared), (Note: Until 1993, in the event of a draw, the FA Charity Shield would be shared between the two competing teams, with each side having possession of the trophy for six months. Burnley and Wolverhampton Wanderers drew 2–2.) 1973
  - Runners-up: 1921
- Texaco Cup
  - Runners-up: 1973–74
- Anglo-Scottish Cup
  - Winners: 1978–79
- Associate Members' Cup
  - Runners-up: 1987–88

Regional

- Lancashire Cup (Note: The club has fielded its reserve team in the competition since the mid-1990s.)
  - Winners (14): 1889–90, 1914–15, 1949–50, 1951–52, 1959–60, 1960–61, 1961–62, 1964–65, 1965–66, 1969–70, 1971–72, 1992–93, 2022–23, 2025–26

== Records and statistics ==
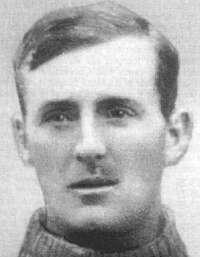
Jerry Dawson holds the record for most Burnley appearances, with 569.

The record for the most first team appearances in all competitions for Burnley is held by goalkeeper Jerry Dawson, who played 569 games between 1907 and 1929. The club's top goal scorer is George Beel, who scored 188 goals from 1923 to 1932. In 1962, Jimmy Adamson won the FWA Footballer of the Year award, the first and to date only time a Burnley player achieved this. Willie Irvine became top goal scorer in the first tier in 1965–66 with 29 goals, also a unique feat in the club's history.

Jimmy McIlroy is the most capped player while at the club, making 51 appearances for Northern Ireland between 1951 and 1962. The first Burnley player to play in a full international match was John Yates, who took to the field for England against Ireland in March 1889. He scored a hat-trick but was never called up again. In January 1957, 17-year-old Ian Lawson netted a record four goals on his debut for Burnley against Chesterfield in the FA Cup third round. The youngest player to play for the club is Tommy Lawton, who was aged 16 years and 174 days on his debut against Doncaster Rovers in the Second Division on 28 March 1936. His debut made him the then youngest centre-forward ever to play in the Football League. The oldest player is Len Smelt, who played his last match aged 41 years and 132 days against Arsenal in the First Division on 18 April 1925.

The club's largest win in league football was a 9–0 victory against Darwen in the 1891–92 Football League season. Burnley's largest victories in the FA Cup have been 9–0 wins over Crystal Palace (1908–09), New Brighton (1956–57) and Penrith (1984–85). The largest defeat is an 11–0 loss to Darwen Old Wanderers in the 1885–86 FA Cup first round, when Burnley fielded their reserve side, as most professionals were still prohibited entry due to rules of the FA (Note: Professionals could only play in the FA Cup and County FA competitions if they had been born or had resided within six miles (9.7 km) of their club's ground for a minimum of two years.) that period.

The team's longest unbeaten run in the top tier was between 6 September 1920 and 25 March 1921, to which they remained unbeaten for 30 games on their way to the First Division title. It stood as the longest stretch without defeat in a single English professional league season until Arsenal bettered it in 2003–04. Burnley set their longest unbeaten run in any division during the 2024–25 EFL Championship season, going without defeat in the final 33 matches. They also matched or broke several English league records that season, including the lowest goals conceded-per-game average (0.35; 16 goals in 46 matches), the joint-most clean sheets (30, equalling Port Vale's 1953–54 side), becoming the first team to avoid conceding more than one goal in any league fixture, and the first to twice gain at least 100 points in a specific division (EFL Championship; 101 in 2022–23 and 100 in 2024–25).

The club's highest home attendance is 54,775, for an FA Cup third round match against Huddersfield Town on 23 February 1924; Burnley's record home attendance in the league is 52,869, for a First Division game against Blackpool on 11 October 1947. The highest transfer fee received is the £31 million (plus add-ons and a sell-on clause) paid by Manchester City for James Trafford in 2025, which also made him the most expensive British goalkeeper in history. The highest transfer fee paid by Burnley is the circa £23 million paid to Chelsea for midfielder Lesley Ugochukwu in 2025. Bob Kelly broke the world transfer record in 1925, when he moved for a fee of £6,500 (equivalent to £340,000 in 2025) from Burnley to Sunderland.
