= 2024–25 Burnley F.C. season =

English football club season

Burnley
2024–25 season
- Chairman: Alan Pace
- Head coach: Scott Parker
- Stadium: Turf Moor
- Championship: 2nd (promoted)
- FA Cup: Fifth round
- EFL Cup: Second round
- Top goalscorer: League: Josh Brownhill (18); All: Josh Brownhill (18)
- Highest home attendance: 21,486 v Sheffield United (21 April 2025, Championship)
- Lowest home attendance: 18,187 v Oxford United (4 February 2025, Championship)
- Average home league attendance: 19,876
Home colours	Away colours	Third colours

The 2024–25 season was the 143rd season in the history of Burnley Football Club, and the club's first season back in the Championship following relegation from the Premier League in the previous campaign. In addition to the domestic league, the club also participated in the FA Cup and the EFL Cup.

On 21 April 2025, Burnley won promotion back to the Premier League at the first attempt after they beat Sheffield United 2–1 at home. The victory also saw Burnley reach 31 league matches unbeaten, setting a new club record. They ended the season with a 33-match unbeaten run and finished on 100 points.

The team matched or broke several records during the season. Burnley remained unbeaten at home, the first Championship side to do so since 2009–10. They gained 49 points away from home, including 14 wins, setting a new Championship record. Burnley conceded just 16 goals in 46 matches—an average of 0.35 per game—setting the best defensive record in English league history. They also kept 30 clean sheets—matching Port Vale's record from 1953–54—and became the first side in English league history not to concede more than one goal in any fixture throughout an entire season. The team also went 12 consecutive league matches without conceding a goal between 21 December 2024 and 4 March 2025, setting a new Football League record. Additionally, Burnley became the first club to record at least 100 points in a specific division on two separate occasions (101 points in 2022–23). Despite these accomplishments, they finished second in the league behind Leeds United on goal difference, becoming the first team in English football history to reach 100 points without winning the title.

== Transfers ==
=== In ===
Date	Pos.	Player	From	Fee	Ref.
14 June 2024 (Note: The transfer was announced on 21 May, and would become official on 14 June once the transfer window re-opened)	CB	Maxime Estève (FRA)	Montpellier (FRA)	Undisclosed	
14 June 2024	LW	Mike Trésor (BEL)	Genk (BEL)	Undisclosed	
1 July 2024 (Note: The transfer was announced on 21 June, and would become official on 1 July once his Arsenal contract expired)	LW	Kamarni Ryan (ENG) (Note: Signed initially for the Under-21s)	Arsenal (ENG)	Free	
1 July 2024 (Note: The transfer was announced on 28 June, and would become official on 1 July once his PSV Eindhoven contract expired)	RB	Shurandy Sambo (NED)	PSV Eindhoven (NED)	Free	
6 July 2024	RW	Jóhann Berg Guðmundsson (ISL)	Free agent	Free	
11 July 2024	CM	Charlie Veevers (ENG)	Swansea City (WAL)	Free	
16 July 2024	LB	Lucas Pires (BRA)	Santos (BRA)	£2,000,000	
17 July 2024	CF	Andréas Hountondji (BEN)	Caen (FRA)	£3,400,000	
19 July 2024	GK	Václav Hladký (CZE)	Free agent	Free	
7 August 2024	GK	Etienne Green (ENG)	Saint-Étienne (FRA)	Undisclosed	
22 August 2024	CB	Joe Worrall (ENG)	Nottingham Forest (ENG)	Undisclosed	
28 August 2024	AM	Hannibal Mejbri (TUN)	Manchester United (ENG)	£5,400,000 (Note: Excluding £4m in add-ons)	
29 August 2024	LW	Julien Vetro (FRA)	Bordeaux (FRA)	Free	
30 August 2024	CM	Josh Laurent (ENG)	Stoke City (ENG)	£500,000 (Note: Excluding £0.5m in add-ons)	
30 August 2024	AM	Oluwaseun Adewumi (AUT)	Floridsdorfer AC (AUT)	Undisclosed	
10 September 2024	CB	John Egan (IRL)	Free agent	Free	
23 September 2024	RB	Hamzat Balogun (ENG)	Watford (ENG)	Free	
24 September 2024	CB	Jesse Williams (ENG)	Oldham Athletic (ENG)	Undisclosed	
1 January 2025	RB	Oliver Sonne (PER)	Silkeborg (DEN)	Undisclosed	
2 January 2025	CF	Ashley Barnes (ENG)	Free agent	Free	
20 January 2025	CM	Jonjo Shelvey (ENG)	Free agent	Free	
3 February 2025	LW	Jaydon Banel (NED)	Ajax (NED)	Undisclosed	

=== Out ===
Date	Pos.	Player	To	Fee	Ref.
30 June 2024	GK	Bailey Peacock-Farrell (NIR)	Birmingham City (ENG)	Undisclosed	
17 July 2024	GK	Arijanet Muric (KOS)	Ipswich Town (ENG)	£8,000,000 (Note: Excluding £2m in add-ons)	
23 July 2024	GK	Lawrence Vigouroux (CHI)	Swansea City (WAL)	Undisclosed	
8 August 2024	CM	Samuel Bastien (COD)	Fortuna Sittard (NED)	Undisclosed	
16 August 2024	LW	Wilson Odobert (FRA)	Tottenham Hotspur (ENG)	£31,500,000	
16 August 2024	AM	Scott Twine (ENG)	Bristol City (ENG)	£3,200,000	
22 August 2024	DM	Sander Berge (NOR)	Fulham (ENG)	£20,000,000 (Note: Excluding £5m in add-ons)	
22 August 2024	LW	Anass Zaroury (MAR)	Lens (FRA)	£7,500,000	
23 August 2024	RW	Jóhann Berg Guðmundsson (ISL)	Al-Orobah (KSA)	Undisclosed	
25 August 2024	CB	Dara O'Shea (IRL)	Ipswich Town (ENG)	£12,000,000 (Note: Excluding £3m in add-ons)	
27 August 2024	CB	Ameen Al-Dakhil (BEL)	VfB Stuttgart (GER)	£5,900,000 (Note: Excluding £1.7m in add-ons)	
29 August 2024	CF	Wout Weghorst (NED)	Ajax (NED)	£2,100,000	
30 August 2024	CB	Luke McNally (IRL)	Bristol City (ENG)	£1,750,000	
30 August 2024	RB	Vitinho (BRA)	Botafogo (BRA)	£6,700,000	
20 January 2025	CB	Benn Ward (ENG)	Accrington Stanley (ENG)	Undisclosed	
31 January 2025	CF	Jay Rodriguez (ENG)	Wrexham (WAL)	Undisclosed	
3 February 2025	CB	John Egan (IRL)	Hull City (ENG)	Undisclosed	

=== Loaned in ===
Date	Pos	Player	From	Date until	Ref
21 August 2024	CB	Bashir Humphreys (ENG)	Chelsea (ENG)	End of Season	
29 August 2024	LW	Jaidon Anthony (ENG)	Bournemouth (ENG)	End of Season	
30 August 2024	LW	Jeremy Sarmiento (ECU)	Brighton & Hove Albion (ENG)	End of Season	
30 August 2024	CF	Zian Flemming (NED)	Millwall (ENG)	End of Season	
3 February 2025	RW	Marcus Edwards (ENG)	Sporting CP (POR)	End of Season	

=== Loaned out ===
Date	Pos.	Player	To	Date until	Ref.
16 July 2024	CF	Michael Mellon (SCO)	Stockport County (ENG)	8 January 2025	
7 August 2024	LW	Darko Churlinov (MKD)	Jagiellonia Białystok (POL)	End of Season	
8 August 2024	LW	Dara Costelloe (IRL)	Accrington Stanley (ENG)	24 January 2025	
22 August 2024	CF	Michael Obafemi (IRL)	Plymouth Argyle (ENG)	End of Season	
23 August 2024	CF	Ryan Tioffo (ENG)	Wythenshawe (ENG)	20 September 2024	
29 August 2024	LW	Julien Vetro (FRA)	Dundee (SCO)	22 January 2025	
29 August 2024	CF	Zeki Amdouni (SUI)	Benfica (POR)	End of Season	
30 August 2024	GK	Charlie Casper (ENG)	FC United of Manchester (ENG)	27 September 2024	
30 August 2024	AM	Oluwaseun Adewumi (AUT)	Dundee (SCO)	1 January 2025	
7 September 2024	CF	Joe Westley (ENG)	Rochdale (ENG)	5 October 2024	
13 September 2024	LB	Joe Ashton (ENG)	Hyde United (ENG)	12 October 2024	
30 October 2024	CM	Will Hugill (ENG)	Chester (ENG)	30 November 2024	
5 November 2024	CB	Bradley Grant (ENG)	Marine (ENG)	1 December 2024	
15 November 2024	GK	Jon Ander Vilar Robinson (ESP)	Avro (ENG)	15 December 2024	
16 November 2024	GK	Sam Waller (ENG)	Rochdale (ENG)	15 December 2024	
26 November 2024	CB	Murray Campbell (SCO)	Chorley (ENG)	24 January 2025	
3 December 2024	CM	Will Hugill (ENG)	Fylde (ENG)	1 February 2025	
19 December 2024	CB	Jack McEvilly (ENG)	Clitheroe (ENG)	16 January 2025	
7 January 2025	CM	Han-Noah Massengo (FRA)	Auxerre (FRA)	End of Season	
7 January 2025	CF	Andréas Hountondji (BEN)	Standard Liège (BEL)	End of Season	
8 January 2025	CF	Michael Mellon (SCO)	Bradford City (ENG)	End of Season	
9 January 2025	LB	Owen Dodgson (ENG)	Burton Albion (ENG)	End of Season	
23 January 2024	CB	Hjalmar Ekdal (SWE)	Groningen (NED)	End of Season	
23 January 2025	CF	Joe Westley (ENG)	Swindon Town (ENG)	End of Season	
24 January 2024	CB	Hannes Delcroix (BEL)	Swansea City (WAL)	End of Season	
31 January 2025	CF	Joe Bevan (SCO)	Carlisle United (ENG)	End of Season	
31 January 2025	AM	Lewis Richardson (ENG)	York City (ENG)	End of Season	
31 January 2025	GK	Charlie Casper (ENG)	Bamber Bridge (ENG)	2 March 2025	
3 February 2025	LW	Dara Costelloe (IRL)	Northampton Town (ENG)	End of Season	
4 February 2025	CM	Will Hugill (ENG)	Fylde (ENG)	End of Season	
4 February 2025	LW	Tom Tweedy (WAL)	Fylde (ENG)	4 March 2025	
5 February 2025	RB	Logan Carlin (ENG)	Padiham (ENG)	5 March 2025	
22 March 2025	GK	Lewis Forshaw (ENG)	Lancaster City (ENG)	End of Season	

=== Released / Out of contract ===
Date	Pos.	Player	Subsequent club	Join date	Ref.
30 June 2024	LB	Charlie Taylor (ENG)	Southampton (ENG)	1 July 2024	
30 June 2024	CF	Rohan Vaughan (ENG)	Queens Park Rangers (ENG)	1 July 2024	
30 June 2024	RW	Jóhann Berg Guðmundsson (ISL)	Re-signed for Burnley	6 July 2024	
30 June 2024	LW	Renaldo Torraj (ALB)	Teuta (ALB)	12 July 2024	
30 June 2024	LB	Jack Bates (ENG)	Wigan Athletic (ENG)	17 July 2024	
30 June 2024	CM	Jack Rogers (ENG)	Wigan Athletic (ENG)	17 July 2024	
30 June 2024	CM	Callum West (ENG)	Barnsley (ENG)	17 July 2024	
30 June 2024	CB	Jack Turner (ENG)	Chelmsford City (ENG)	27 July 2024	
30 June 2024	GK	Harry Moss (ENG)	Gateshead (ENG)	August 2024	
30 June 2024	RW	Mikey O'Neill (ENG)	Warrington Town (ENG)	8 August 2024	
30 June 2024	CB	Oliver Sweeney (ENG)	Romulus (ENG)	September 2024	
30 June 2024	DM	Lucas Wane (ENG)	Longridge Town (ENG)	September 2024	
30 June 2024	CB	Michael Parker (ENG)	West Bromwich Albion (ENG)	4 September 2024	
30 June 2024	CF	Kian Le Fondre (SCO)	Cheadle Heath Nomads (ENG)	October 2024	
30 June 2024	DM	Jack Cork (ENG)	Re-signed for Burnley (Note: Cork joined Burnley U21 as an academy player-coach, becoming an assistant to U21 manager Andy Farrell.)	3 October 2024	
30 June 2024	AM	Marcel Lewis (ENG)	Cambridge City (ENG)	17 October 2024	
30 June 2024	CM	Ackeme Francis-Burrell (ENG)	Solihull Moors (ENG)	1 November 2024	
30 June 2024	CM	Sonny Pickup (ENG)	—N/a	—N/a	
30 June 2024	CF	Dylan Sime (ENG)	—N/a	—N/a	

== Pre-season and friendlies ==
On 12 July, Burnley announced their pre-season schedule. The details of most of Burnley's pre-season friendlies were not released. However, Heart of Midlothian head coach Steven Naismith revealed that Burnley and Hearts played two matches against each other, both lasting 75 minutes, with Burnley winning one game 1–0 and the other finishing goalless. It was also rumoured that Burnley defeated Newcastle United 3–2 in another match.

Win Draw Loss Fixtures

Pre-season friendlies
Date	Opponents	Venue	Result	Score F–A	Scorers	Attendance	Ref.
28 July 2024	Leganés	H (Note: Match played at Burnley's Gawthorpe Training Ground)	D	0–0	—	—	
4 August 2024	Cádiz	N (Note: Match played at Estadio Municipal Antonio Gallardo, Arcos de la Frontera)	D	1–1	Foster '54	—	

== Competitions ==
=== Championship ===
==== League table ====
Pos	Team	Pld	W	D	L	GF	GA	GD	Pts	Promotion, qualification or relegation
1	Leeds United (C, P)	46	29	13	4	95	30	+65	100	Promotion to the Premier League
2	Burnley (P)	46	28	16	2	69	16	+53	100	Promotion to the Premier League
3	Sheffield United	46	28	8	10	63	36	+27	90 (Note: Sheffield United were deducted two points for defaulting on payments to other clubs during the 2022–23 and 2023–24 seasons, with a further two points suspended.)	Qualified for the Championship play-offs
4	Sunderland (O, P)	46	21	13	12	58	44	+14	76	Qualified for the Championship play-offs
5	Coventry City	46	20	9	17	64	58	+6	69	Qualified for the Championship play-offs

Source: English Football League
Rules for classification: 1) Points; 2) Goal difference; 3) Number of goals scored; 4) Head-to-head results; 5) Wins; 6) Away goals; 7) Penalty points (sec 9.5); 8) Number of 12-point sending off offences; 9) Play-off (only if needed to determine promotion/relegation)
(C) Champions; (O) Play-off winners; (P) Promoted

==== Results summary ====
Overall								Home						Away					
Pld	W	D	L	GF	GA	GD	Pts	W	D	L	GF	GA	GD	W	D	L	GF	GA	GD
46	28	16	2	69	16	+53	100	14	9	0	35	8	+27	14	7	2	34	8	+26

Last updated: 26 April 2025.
Source: Soccerway

==== Results by round ====
Round	1	2	3	4	5	6	7	8	9	10	11	12	13	14	15	16	17	18	19	20	21	22	23	24	25	26	27	28	29	30	31	32	33	34	35	36	37	38	39	40	41	42	43	44	45	46
Ground	A	H	A	H	A	H	A	H	H	A	A	H	A	A	H	A	H	A	H	H	A	H	A	A	H	A	H	A	H	A	H	H	A	H	A	H	H	A	H	A	A	H	A	H	A	H
Result	W	W	L	D	W	W	D	W	D	W	D	D	L	D	W	W	W	W	D	D	W	W	W	D	D	W	D	W	D	D	W	W	D	W	W	W	D	W	W	W	D	W	W	W	W	W
Position	2	1	5	6	4	3	4	2	3	2	2	2	4	4	4	4	3	2	3	3	3	3	3	3	2	2	3	3	3	3	3	3	3	3	3	3	3	3	3	1	2	2	2	2	2	2

Source: EFL
A = Away; H = Home; W = Win; D = Draw; L = Loss; P = Postponed

==== Matches ====
On 26 June, the Championship fixtures were announced.

Win Draw Loss Fixtures

Championship match details
Date	Opponents	Venue	Result	Score F–A	Scorers	Attendance	Ref.
12 August 2024	Luton Town	A	W	4–1	Brownhill 6', Odobert 37', O'Shea 72', Vitinho 80'	11,777	
17 August 2024	Cardiff City	H	W	5–0	Horvath (o.g.) 9', Koleosho 31', Brownhill 51', Amdouni 88', Guðmundsson 90+2'	19,759	
24 August 2024	Sunderland	A	L	0–1	—	40,096	
31 August 2024	Blackburn Rovers	H	D	1–1	Foster 10'	21,042	
14 September 2024	Leeds United	A	W	1–0	Koleosho 18'	36,405	
21 September 2024	Portsmouth	H	W	2–1	Sarmiento 63', Brownhill 90+4'	20,476	
28 September 2024	Oxford United	A	D	0–0	—	11,517	
1 October 2024	Plymouth Argyle	H	W	1–0	Brownhill (pen.) 26'	18,779	
5 October 2024	Preston North End	H	D	0–0	—	20,816	
19 October 2024	Sheffield Wednesday	A	W	2–0	Anthony 37', Brownhill 50'	28,105	
23 October 2024	Hull City	A	D	1–1	Flemming 77'	20,168	
26 October 2024	Queens Park Rangers	H	D	0–0	—	19,187	
3 November 2024	Millwall	A	L	0–1	—	14,245	
7 November 2024	West Bromwich Albion	A	D	0–0	—	23,443	
10 November 2024	Swansea City	H	W	1–0	Rodriguez (pen.) 90+4'	18,717	
23 November 2024	Bristol City	A	W	1–0	Anthony 23'	20,800	
26 November 2024	Coventry City	H	W	2–0	Sarmiento 47', Egan-Riley 80'	18,293	
30 November 2024	Stoke City	A	W	2–0	Rodriguez 52', Brownhill (pen.) 78'	22,994	
6 December 2024	Middlesbrough	H	D	1–1	Roberts 37'	20,543	
10 December 2024	Derby County	H	D	0–0	—	18,813	
15 December 2024	Norwich City	A	W	2–1	Flemming 68', Brownhill 76'	26,218	
21 December 2024	Watford	H	W	2–1	Anthony 9', Brownhill 62'	19,601	
26 December 2024	Sheffield United	A	W	2–0	Brownhill 43', Flemming 53'	30,580	
29 December 2024	Middlesbrough	A	D	0–0	—	27,686	
1 January 2025	Stoke City	H	D	0–0	—	20,119	
4 January 2025	Blackburn Rovers	A	W	1–0	Flemming 60'	25,909	
17 January 2025	Sunderland	H	D	0–0	—	21,014	
22 January 2025	Plymouth Argyle	A	W	5–0	Flemming 11', 31', Laurent 34', 45', Cullen 45+2'	15,509	
27 January 2025	Leeds United	H	D	0–0	—	21,329	
1 February 2025	Portsmouth	A	D	0–0	—	20,381	
4 February 2025	Oxford United	H	W	1–0	Helik (o.g.) 33'	18,187	
12 February 2025	Hull City	H	W	2–0	Humphreys 3', Flemming 21'	18,987	
15 February 2025	Preston North End	A	D	0–0	—	19,864	
21 February 2025	Sheffield Wednesday	H	W	4–0	Edwards 43', Brownhill 62', Roberts 70', Benson 90+5'	20,675	
4 March 2025	Cardiff City	A	W	2–1	Brownhill 19', Estève 40'	15,713	
8 March 2025	Luton Town	H	W	4–0	McGuinness (o.g.) 30', Foster 39', Brownhill 53', Barnes 90+4'	19,453	
11 March 2025	West Bromwich Albion	H	D	1–1	Flemming 23'	18,843	
15 March 2025	Swansea City	A	W	2–0	Brownhill 4', Anthony 22'	13,679	
29 March 2025	Bristol City	H	W	1–0	Flemming 16'	20,523	
5 April 2025	Coventry City	A	W	2–1	Anthony 16', 46'	28,704	
8 April 2025	Derby County	A	D	0–0	—	27,584	
11 April 2025	Norwich City	H	W	2–1	Mejbri 14', Anthony 24'	19,030	
18 April 2025	Watford	A	W	2–1	Flemming 43', Brownhill 58'	20,523	
21 April 2025	Sheffield United	H	W	2–1	Brownhill 28', 44'	21,486	
26 April 2025	Queens Park Rangers	A	W	5–0	Cullen 9', Flemming 20', 28', Sarmiento 62', 90+2'	16,977	
3 May 2025	Millwall	H	W	3–1	Brownhill 13', 90+3', Anthony 65'	21,485	

=== FA Cup ===
Burnley entered the FA Cup at the third round stage, and were drawn away to Reading.

Win Draw Loss Fixtures

FA Cup match details
Round	Date	Opponents	Venue	Result	Score F–A	Scorers	Attendance	Ref.
Third round	11 January 2025	Reading	A	W	3–1 (a.e.t.)	Foster 71', Flemming 100', 109'	7,039	
Fourth round	8 February 2025	Southampton	A	W	1–0	Edwards 77'	15,253	
Fifth round	1 March 2025	Preston North End	A	L	0–3	—	17,761	

=== EFL Cup ===
Burnley entered in the second round, and were drawn away to Wolverhampton Wanderers.

Win Draw Loss Fixtures

EFL Cup match details
Round	Date	Opponents	Venue	Result	Score F–A	Scorers	Attendance	Ref.
Second round	28 August 2024	Wolverhampton Wanderers	A	L	0–2	—	19,236	

== Statistics ==
=== Appearances and goals ===
Players with no appearances are not included on the list. Players with names in italics are on loan at Burnley from another club for the whole of the season.

No.	Pos	Nat	Player	Total		Championship		FA Cup		EFL Cup	
No.	Pos	Nat	Player	Apps	Goals	Apps	Goals	Apps	Goals	Apps	Goals
1	GK	(England) ENG	James Trafford	45	0	45+0	0	0+0	0	0+0	0
2	DF	(Peru) PER	Oliver Sonne	5	0	0+2	0	3+0	0	0+0	0
3	DF	(Netherlands) NED	Shurandy Sambo	2	0	0+1	0	0+0	0	1+0	0
4	DF	(England) ENG	Joe Worrall	13	0	3+6	0	3+0	0	1+0	0
5	DF	(France) FRA	Maxime Estève	48	1	46+0	1	1+1	0	0+0	0
6	DF	(England) ENG	CJ Egan-Riley	43	1	40+1	1	1+0	0	1+0	0
7	FW	(Ecuador) ECU	Jeremy Sarmiento	37	4	11+24	4	2+0	0	0+0	0
8	MF	(England) ENG	Josh Brownhill	44	18	39+3	18	1+0	0	1+0	0
10	FW	(Angola) ANG	Manuel Benson	5	1	0+3	1	2+0	0	0+0	0
11	FW	(England) ENG	Jaidon Anthony	43	8	42+1	8	0+0	0	0+0	0
12	DF	(England) ENG	Bashir Humphreys	28	1	20+5	1	1+1	0	1+0	0
14	DF	(Wales) WAL	Connor Roberts	42	2	40+1	2	0+0	0	0+1	0
15	FW	(England) ENG	Nathan Redmond	3	0	0+2	0	0+1	0	0+0	0
17	FW	(South Africa) RSA	Lyle Foster	31	3	17+11	2	2+0	1	0+1	0
19	FW	(Netherlands) NED	Zian Flemming	37	14	28+7	12	0+2	2	0+0	0
21	MF	(England) ENG	Aaron Ramsey	1	0	0+1	0	0+0	0	0+0	0
22	FW	(England) ENG	Marcus Edwards	16	2	12+2	1	0+2	1	0+0	0
23	DF	(Brazil) BRA	Lucas Pires	38	0	32+2	0	3+0	0	0+1	0
24	MF	(Republic of Ireland) IRL	Josh Cullen	44	2	43+1	2	0+0	0	0+0	0
26	MF	(England) ENG	Jonjo Shelvey	4	0	0+2	0	2+0	0	0+0	0
28	MF	(Tunisia) TUN	Hannibal Mejbri	39	1	23+14	1	1+0	0	1+0	0
29	MF	(England) ENG	Josh Laurent	44	2	25+17	2	0+2	0	0+0	0
30	FW	(Italy) ITA	Luca Koleosho	30	2	20+8	2	2+0	0	0+0	0
31	MF	(Belgium) BEL	Mike Trésor	1	0	0+0	0	0+1	0	0+0	0
32	GK	(Czech Republic) CZE	Václav Hladký	5	0	1+0	0	3+0	0	1+0	0
34	FW	(Netherlands) NED	Jaydon Banel	1	0	0+0	0	0+1	0	0+0	0
35	FW	(England) ENG	Ashley Barnes	16	1	1+12	1	2+1	0	0+0	0
41	MF	(England) ENG	Joe Bauress	2	0	0+0	0	1+1	0	0+0	0
48	FW	(Belgium) BEL	Enock Agyei	3	0	0+3	0	0+0	0	0+0	0
49	MF	(England) ENG	Tommy McDermott	2	0	0+0	0	1+0	0	0+1	0
Players who featured but departed on loan during the season:
18	DF	(Sweden) SWE	Hjalmar Ekdal	1	0	0+0	0	0+1	0	0+0	0
25	FW	(Switzerland) SUI	Zeki Amdouni	2	1	0+2	1	0+0	0	0+0	0
37	FW	(Benin) BEN	Andréas Hountondji	10	0	2+7	0	0+0	0	1+0	0
42	MF	(France) FRA	Han-Noah Massengo	9	0	1+7	0	0+0	0	1+0	0
43	MF	(England) ENG	Will Hugill	1	0	0+0	0	0+0	0	0+1	0
Players who featured but departed the club permanently during the season:
2	DF	(Republic of Ireland) IRL	Dara O'Shea	2	1	2+0	1	0+0	0	0+0	0
7	FW	(Iceland) ISL	Jóhann Berg Guðmundsson	1	1	0+1	1	0+0	0	0+0	0
9	FW	(England) ENG	Jay Rodriguez	22	2	8+12	2	1+0	0	1+0	0
16	DF	(Republic of Ireland) IRL	John Egan	8	0	1+6	0	1+0	0	0+0	0
19	FW	(Morocco) MAR	Anass Zaroury	1	0	0+1	0	0+0	0	0+0	0
22	DF	(Brazil) BRA	Vitinho	3	1	3+0	1	0+0	0	0+0	0
29	FW	(Netherlands) NED	Wout Weghorst	2	0	0+2	0	0+0	0	0+0	0
34	DF	(Republic of Ireland) IRL	Luke McNally	3	0	0+2	0	0+0	0	1+0	0
47	FW	(France) FRA	Wilson Odobert	1	1	1+0	1	0+0	0	0+0	0
