= Charley Oosenbrugh =

Scottish footballer (born 2009)

Personal information
- Date of birth: 23 June 2009 (age 17)
- Place of birth: Dundee, Scotland
- Position: Defender

Team information
- Current team: Montrose (on co-op loan from Dundee)
- Number: 15

Youth career
- 2015–: Dundee

Senior career*
Years	Team	Apps	(Gls)
2025–	Dundee	1	(0)
2026–	→ Montrose (loan)	2	(0)

International career^{‡}
2025–	Scotland U17	5	(0)
- * Club domestic league appearances and goals as of 17:00, 5 September 2026 (UTC) ‡ National team caps and goals as of 21 March 2026

Charley Oosenbrugh (born 23 June 2009) is a Scottish professional footballer who plays as a defender for Scottish League One club Montrose, on a co-operation loan from Scottish Premiership club Dundee.

== Club career ==
=== Youth career ===
Oosenbrugh joined the youth academy of Dundee at the age of six, and has been part of the club's Performance School at St John's RC High School. As part of Dundee's youth setup, Oosenbrugh was part of the Dundee U18 side which progressed to the 2025 Scottish Youth Cup final, losing 2–0 to Kilmarnock U18 at Hampden Park.

=== Dundee ===
On 17 July 2025, Oosenbrugh signed his first professional contract with Dundee. He made his first competitive appearance for the club's B team on 12 August in a Scottish Challenge Cup match away to Montrose. On 12 May 2026, Oosenbrugh made his senior debut for Dundee's first team at the age of 16, coming on as a substitute in a Scottish Premiership match away to Kilmarnock. After conceding a penalty kick which led to Killie's winning goal, Dundee managed Steven Pressley backed Oosenbrugh as "a player of immense talent" and would learn quickly from the harsh lessons of senior football.

On 23 July 2026, Oosenbrugh signed a new deal with Dundee which kept him with the club until 2029.

==== Montrose (co-op loan) ====
On 29 August 2026, Oosenbrugh joined Scottish League One club Montrose on loan as part of their co-operation agreement with Dundee. He made his debut that same day, coming off the bench in a home victory over Queen of the South.

== International career ==
Oosenbrugh was called up to the Scotland national under-17 football team in October 2025 for the 2026 UEFA European U17 Championship qualifiers. He made his debut for Scotland U17 on 28 October, coming off the bench in a win over England U17. Oosenbrugh made his first Scotland U17 start on 3 November in a win over Lithuania U17.

== Career statistics ==
As of 5 September 2026

Appearances and goals by club, season and competition
Club	Season	League			National cup		League cup		Other		Total	
Club	Season	Division	Apps	Goals	Apps	Goals	Apps	Goals	Apps	Goals	Apps	Goals
Dundee	2025–26	Scottish Premiership	1	0	0	0	0	0	0	0	1	0
Dundee	2026–27	Scottish Premiership	0	0	0	0	2	0	0	0	2	0
Dundee	Total		1	0	0	0	2	0	0	0	3	0
Dundee B	2025–26	—			—		—		5 (Note: Appearances in the Scottish Challenge Cup)	0	5	0
Dundee B	2026–27	—			—		—		2	0	2	0
Dundee B	Total		0	0	0	0	0	0	7	0	7	0
Montrose (loan)	2026–27	Scottish League One	2	0	0	0	—		0	0	2	0
Career total			3	0	0	0	2	0	7	0	12	0
