= 2023–24 Burnley F.C. season =

English football club season

Burnley
2023–24 season
- Chairman: Alan Pace
- Manager: Vincent Kompany
- Stadium: Turf Moor
- Premier League: 19th (relegated)
- FA Cup: Third round
- EFL Cup: Fourth round
- Top goalscorer: League: Jacob Bruun Larsen (6); All: Jacob Bruun Larsen (7)
- Highest home attendance: 21,781 (v Newcastle United, Premier League, 4 May 2024)
- Lowest home attendance: 19,713 (v Bournemouth, Premier League, 3 March 2024)
- Average home league attendance: 21,152
Home colours	Away colours	Third colours

The 2023–24 season was the 142nd season in the history of Burnley Football Club and their first season back in the Premier League since the 2021–22 campaign, following promotion from the EFL Championship in the previous season. The club also participated in the FA Cup and EFL Cup.

After losing 2–1 at home to West Ham United on 25 November 2023, Burnley became the second team in English league history (after Newport County in 1970–71) to lose their first seven home matches of the season. The streak was ended the following game when Burnley defeated Sheffield United 5–0.

On 11 May 2024, Burnley were officially relegated from the Premier League following a 2–1 loss at Tottenham Hotspur.

== Squad ==
No.	Player	Position	Nationality	Place of birth	Date of birth (age)	Signed from	Contract end
Goalkeepers
1	James Trafford	GK	(England)	Cockermouth	10 October 2002 (age 24)	Manchester City	30 June 2027
29	Lawrence Vigouroux	GK	(Chile)	(England) Camden	19 November 1993 (age 32)	Leyton Orient	30 June 2026
49	Arijanet Muric	GK	(Kosovo)	(Switzerland) Schlieren	7 November 1998 (age 28)	Manchester City	30 June 2026
Defenders
2	Dara O'Shea	CB	(Republic of Ireland)	Dublin	4 March 1999 (age 27)	West Bromwich Albion	30 June 2026
3	Charlie Taylor	LB	(England)	York	18 September 1993 (age 33)	Leeds United	30 June 2024
5	Jordan Beyer	CB	(Germany)	Kempen	19 May 2000 (age 26)	(Germany) Borussia Mönchengladbach	30 June 2027
18	Hjalmar Ekdal	CB	(Sweden)	Stockholm	21 October 1998 (age 28)	(Sweden) Djurgårdens IF	30 June 2027
20	Lorenz Assignon	RB	(France)	Grasse	22 June 2000 (age 26)	(France) Rennes	30 June 2024
22	Vitinho	RB	(Brazil)	Belo Horizonte	23 July 1999 (age 27)	(Belgium) Cercle Brugge	30 June 2026
28	Ameen Al-Dakhil	CB	(Belgium)	(Iraq) Baghdad	6 March 2002 (age 24)	(Belgium) Sint-Truiden	30 June 2026
33	Maxime Estève	CB	(France)	Montpellier	26 May 2002 (age 24)	(France) Montpellier	31 May 2024
44	Hannes Delcroix	CB	(Belgium)	(Haiti) Petite Rivière de l'Artibonite	28 February 1999 (age 27)	(Belgium) Anderlecht	30 June 2026
Midfielders
4	Jack Cork	DM	(England)	Carshalton	25 June 1989 (age 37)	(Wales) Swansea City	30 June 2024
7	Jóhann Berg Guðmundsson	AM	(Iceland)	Reykjavík	27 October 1990 (age 36)	Charlton Athletic	30 June 2024
8	Josh Brownhill	CM	(England)	Warrington	19 December 1995 (age 30)	Bristol City	30 June 2024
16	Sander Berge	DM	(Norway)	Bærum	14 February 1998 (age 28)	Sheffield United	30 June 2027
21	Aaron Ramsey	AM	(England)	Great Barr	21 January 2003 (age 23)	Aston Villa	30 June 2028
24	Josh Cullen	CM	(Republic of Ireland)	(England) Westcliff-on-Sea	7 April 1996 (age 30)	(Belgium) Anderlecht	30 June 2025
42	Han-Noah Massengo	DM	(France)	Villepinte	7 July 2001 (age 25)	Bristol City	30 June 2027
Forwards
9	Jay Rodriguez	CF	(England)	Burnley	29 July 1989 (age 37)	West Bromwich Albion	30 June 2024
10	Manuel Benson	RW	(Belgium)	Lokeren	28 March 1997 (age 29)	(Belgium) Antwerp	30 June 2026
15	Nathan Redmond	RW	(England)	Birmingham	6 March 1994 (age 32)	(Turkey) Beşiktaş	30 June 2025
17	Lyle Foster	CF	(South Africa)	Johannesburg	3 September 2000 (age 26)	(Belgium) Westerlo	30 June 2027
23	David Datro Fofana	CF	(Ivory Coast)	Ouragahio	22 December 2002 (age 23)	Chelsea	31 May 2024
25	Zeki Amdouni	CF	(Switzerland)	Geneva	4 December 2000 (age 25)	(Switzerland) Basel	30 June 2028
30	Luca Koleosho	RW	(Italy)	(United States) Norwalk	15 September 2004 (age 22)	(Spain) Espanyol	30 June 2027
31	Mike Trésor	LW	(Belgium)	Antwerp	28 May 1999 (age 27)	(Belgium) Genk	31 May 2024
34	Jacob Bruun Larsen	LW	(Denmark)	Lyngby	19 September 1998 (age 28)	(Germany) 1899 Hoffenheim	31 May 2024
47	Wilson Odobert	LW	(France)	Meaux	28 November 2004 (age 21)	(France) Troyes	30 June 2028
Out on loan
—	Bailey Peacock-Farrell	GK	(Northern Ireland)	(England) Darlington	29 October 1996 (age 30)	Leeds United	30 June 2024
—	Connor Roberts	RB	(Wales)	Crynant	23 September 1995 (age 31)	(Wales) Swansea City	30 June 2025
—	CJ Egan-Riley	CB	(England)	Manchester	2 January 2003 (age 23)	Manchester City	30 June 2026
—	Luke McNally	CB	(Republic of Ireland)	Enfield	20 September 1999 (age 27)	Oxford United	30 June 2026
—	Owen Dodgson	LB	(England)	Lancaster	19 March 2003 (age 23)	Academy	30 June 2025
—	Samuel Bastien	CM	(Democratic Republic of the Congo)	(Belgium) Meux	26 September 1996 (age 30)	(Belgium) Standard Liège	30 June 2025
—	Scott Twine	AM	(England)	Swindon	14 July 1999 (age 27)	Milton Keynes Dons	30 June 2026
—	Darko Churlinov	LW	(North Macedonia)	Skopje	11 July 2000 (age 26)	(Germany) VfB Stuttgart	30 June 2026
—	Dara Costelloe	LW	(Republic of Ireland)	Limerick	11 December 2002 (age 23)	(Republic of Ireland) Galway United	30 June 2024
—	Anass Zaroury	LW	(Morocco)	(Belgium) Mechelen	7 November 2000 (age 26)	(Belgium) Sporting Charleroi	30 June 2026
—	Michael Obafemi	CF	(Republic of Ireland)	Dublin	6 July 2000 (age 26)	(Wales) Swansea City	30 June 2025
—	Wout Weghorst	CF	(Netherlands)	Borne	7 August 1992 (age 34)	(Germany) VfL Wolfsburg	30 June 2025

== Transfers ==
=== In ===
Date	Pos.	Player	Transferred from	Fee	Ref.
23 June 2023	CB	(Republic of Ireland) Dara O'Shea	(England) West Bromwich Albion	£7,000,000	
27 June 2023	GK	(Chile) Lawrence Vigouroux	(England) Leyton Orient	Free transfer	
1 July 2023	CB	(Germany) Jordan Beyer	(Germany) Borussia Mönchengladbach	£13,000,000	
1 July 2023	CF	(Republic of Ireland) Michael Obafemi	(Wales) Swansea City	£3,500,000	
1 July 2023	AM	(Equatorial Guinea) Basilio Rieno (Note: Signed initially for the under-21s)	(England) Crystal Palace	Free transfer	
19 July 2023	CF	(Switzerland) Zeki Amdouni	(Switzerland) Basel	£16,100,000	
20 July 2023	GK	(England) James Trafford	(England) Manchester City	£15,000,000 (Note: Excluding £4,000,000 in add-ons)	
21 July 2023	RW	(England) Nathan Redmond	(Turkey) Beşiktaş	Free transfer	
25 July 2023	RW	(Italy) Luca Koleosho	(Spain) Espanyol	£2,600,000	
9 August 2023	DM	(Norway) Sander Berge	(England) Sheffield United	£12,000,000 (Note: Excluding add-ons)	
12 August 2023	LW	(France) Wilson Odobert	(France) Troyes	Undisclosed	
22 August 2023	CB	(Belgium) Hannes Delcroix	(Belgium) Anderlecht	Undisclosed	
22 August 2023	AM	(England) Aaron Ramsey	(England) Aston Villa	£14,000,000	
31 August 2023	DM	(France) Han-Noah Massengo	(England) Bristol City	Free transfer	
1 September 2023	LB	(England) Logan Pye	(England) Manchester United	Undisclosed	
14 September 2023	CB	(Scotland) Murray Campbell	(Scotland) St Mirren	Compensation	
1 February 2024	CF	(Scotland) Joe Bevan	(Scotland) Albion Rovers	Undisclosed	
1 February 2024	LB	(England) Michael Parker	(England) Shrewsbury Town	Free Transfer	
1 February 2024	AM	(England) Tommy McDermott	(England) Port Vale	Undisclosed	
1 February 2024	CF	(England) Mikey O'Neill	(England) Preston North End	Undisclosed	

=== Out ===
Date	Pos.	Player	Transferred to	Fee	Ref.
30 June 2023	LB	(England) Finlay Armstrong	(England) Fleetwood Town	Free transfer	
30 June 2023	CF	(England) Ashley Barnes	(England) Norwich City	Free transfer	
30 June 2023	CB	(England) Trevon Bryan	(England) Bolton Wanderers	Released	
30 June 2023	RB	(Northern Ireland) Jacson Coppack	Free agent	Released	
30 June 2023	CM	(Scotland) Frankie Deane	Free agent	Released	
30 June 2023	CM	(England) Jacob Hamilton	Free agent	Released	
30 June 2023	CB	(Thailand) Nathan James	(England) Barnsley	Released	
30 June 2023	GK	(Denmark) Lukas Jensen	(England) Lincoln City	Released	
30 June 2023	RB	(England) Matthew Lowton	(England) Witton Albion	End of contract	
30 June 2023	LB	(Northern Ireland) Dane McCullough	(Northern Ireland) Linfield	Released	
30 June 2023	CF	(Scotland) Joe McGlynn	(Scotland) Hamilton Academical	Released	
30 June 2023	GK	(England) Will Norris	(England) Portsmouth	Released	
30 June 2023	RB	(Republic of Ireland) Tosin Olopade	(England) Salford City	Released	
30 June 2023	CM	(England) Kade Ratchford	Free agent	Released	
30 June 2023	LW	(Republic of Ireland) Deji Sotona	(England) Doncaster Rovers	Released	
30 June 2023	GK	(England) Lewis Thomas	(England) Harrogate Town	Released	
30 June 2023	RW	(England) Seb Thompson	(England) Macclesfield	Released	
30 June 2023	CM	(Bermuda) Ne-Jai Tucker	Free agent	Released	
30 June 2023	RB	(Wales) Keelan Williams	(Wales) Bala Town	Released	
22 July 2023	CB	(England) Bobby Thomas	(England) Coventry City	£2,000,000	
24 January 2024	CM	(England) Jez Davies	(England) Salford City	Free Transfer	
1 February 2024	GK	(Italy) Denis Franchi	(Italy) Ternana	Undisclosed	
1 February 2024	CB	(England) Dan Sassi	(England) Blackpool	Undisclosed	

=== Loaned in ===
Date	Pos.	Player	Loaned from	Until	Ref.
27 July 2023	LW	(Denmark) Jacob Bruun Larsen	(Germany) 1899 Hoffenheim	End of season	
1 September 2023	LW	(Belgium) Mike Trésor	(Belgium) Genk	End of season	
13 January 2024	CF	(Ivory Coast) David Datro Fofana	(England) Chelsea	End of season	
1 February 2024	CB	(France) Maxime Estève	(France) Montpellier	End of season	
1 February 2024	RB	(France) Lorenz Assignon	(France) Rennes	End of season	

=== Loaned out ===
Date	Pos.	Player	Loaned to	Date until	Ref.
11 July 2023	CF	(Scotland) Michael Mellon	(England) Morecambe	8 January 2024 (Note: On 8 January, Mellon was recalled early from his season-long loan at Morecambe.)	
24 July 2023	GK	(Northern Ireland) Bailey Peacock-Farrell	(Denmark) AGF	End of season	
2 August 2023	CB	(Republic of Ireland) Luke McNally	(England) Stoke City	End of season	
4 August 2023	CB	(England) Benn Ward	(England) Swindon Town	8 January 2024 (Note: On 8 January, Ward was recalled early from his season-long loan at Swindon.)	
9 August 2023	CF	(Netherlands) Wout Weghorst	(Germany) 1899 Hoffenheim	End of season	
15 August 2023	LW	(Republic of Ireland) Dara Costelloe	(Scotland) St Johnstone	1 January 2024 (Note: On 1 January, Costelloe was recalled early from his season-long loan at St Johnstone.)	
17 August 2023	AM	(England) Scott Twine	(England) Hull City	15 January 2024 (Note: On 15 January, Twine was recalled from his loan at Hull and subsequently joined Bristol City on loan.)	
1 September 2023	AM	(England) Marcel Lewis	(Scotland) Dundee	8 January 2024 (Note: On 8 January, Lewis was recalled early from his season-long loan at Dundee.)	
1 September 2023	LB	(England) Owen Dodgson	(England) Barnsley	1 January 2024 (Note: On 1 January, Dodgson was recalled early from his season-long loan at Barnsley.)	
15 September 2023	CM	(Democratic Republic of the Congo) Samuel Bastien	(Turkey) Kasımpaşa	End of season	
1 January 2024	LW	(Republic of Ireland) Dara Costelloe	(Scotland) Dundee	End of season	
15 January 2024	AM	(England) Scott Twine	(England) Bristol City	End of season	
19 January 2024	LB	(England) Owen Dodgson	(Scotland) Dundee	End of season	
23 January 2024	LW	(North Macedonia) Darko Churlinov	(Germany) Schalke 04	End of season	
23 January 2024	CF	(Republic of Ireland) Michael Obafemi	(England) Millwall	End of season	
23 January 2024	CF	(England) Joe Westley	(England) AFC Fylde	End of season	
26 January 2024	CF	(Scotland) Michael Mellon	(Scotland) Dundee	End of season	
1 February 2024	CB	(England) CJ Egan-Riley	(Netherlands) PSV Eindhoven	End of season	
1 February 2024	AM	(England) Marcel Lewis	(England) Curzon Ashton	End of season	
1 February 2024	RB	(Wales) Connor Roberts	(England) Leeds United	End of season	
1 February 2024	LW	(Morocco) Anass Zaroury	(England) Hull City	End of season	

== Pre-season and friendlies ==
Win Draw Loss

Pre-season and friendlies match details
Date	Opponents	Venue	Result	Score F–A	Scorers	Attendance	Ref.
1 July 2023	Fleetwood Town	H (Note: Match played at Burnley's Gawthorpe Training Ground)	W	3–2	Rodriguez, Davies, Mellon	Behind closed doors	
8 July 2023	Burton Albion	H	W	1–0	Rieno	Behind closed doors	
11 July 2023	Port Vale	H	W	3–1	Brownhill (2), Westley	Behind closed doors	
14 July 2023	Sheffield Wednesday	H	W	3–0	Twine, Brownhill, Costelloe	Behind closed doors	
22 July 2023	Genk	A	L	0–2			
25 July 2023	Benfica	N	W	2–0	Dodgson, Ekdal		
28 July 2023	Real Betis	N	D	1–1	Beyer		
5 August 2023	Mainz 05	A	L	0–3			
18 August 2023 (Note: As the league match away at Luton Town was postponed, Burnley played a friendly match against Dundee United instead.)	Dundee United	H	W	6–0	Amdouni (2), Redmond (2), Ekdal, Benson	Behind closed doors	

== Competitions ==
=== Overall record ===
Competition	First match	Last match	Starting round	Final position	Record							
Competition	First match	Last match	Starting round	Final position	Pld	W	D	L	GF	GA	GD	Win %
Premier League	11 August 2023	19 May 2024	Matchday 1	19th	38	5	9	24	41	78	−37	13.16
FA Cup	5 January 2024		Third round	Third round	1	0	0	1	0	1	−1	0.00
EFL Cup	30 August 2023	1 November 2023	Second round	Fourth round	3	2	0	1	5	3	+2	66.67
Total					42	7	9	26	46	82	−36	16.67

Source: Soccerway

=== Premier League ===
==== League table ====
Pos	Team	Pld	W	D	L	GF	GA	GD	Pts	Qualification or relegation
16	Brentford	38	10	9	19	56	65	−9	39	
17	Nottingham Forest	38	9	9	20	49	67	−18	32 (Note: Nottingham Forest were deducted four points for breaching profitability and sustainability rules. The club appealed the decision but were unsuccessful.)	
18	Luton Town (R)	38	6	8	24	52	85	−33	26	Relegation to EFL Championship
19	Burnley (R)	38	5	9	24	41	78	−37	24	Relegation to EFL Championship
20	Sheffield United (R)	38	3	7	28	35	104	−69	16	Relegation to EFL Championship

Source: Premier League
Rules for classification: 1) Points; 2) Goal difference; 3) Goals scored; 4) If the champions, relegated teams or qualified teams for UEFA competitions cannot be determined by rules 1 to 3, rules 4.1 to 4.3 are applied – 4.1) Points gained in head-to-head record between such teams; 4.2) Away goals scored in head-to-head record between such teams; 4.3) Play-offs
(R) Relegated

==== Results summary ====
Overall								Home						Away					
Pld	W	D	L	GF	GA	GD	Pts	W	D	L	GF	GA	GD	W	D	L	GF	GA	GD
38	5	9	24	41	78	−37	24	2	4	13	19	43	−24	3	5	11	22	35	−13

Source: Soccerway

==== Results by round ====
Round	1	3	4	5	6	7	2^{1}	8	9	10	11	12	13	14	15	16	17	18	19	20	21	22	23	24	25	26	27	28	29	30	31	32	33	34	35	36	37	38
Ground	H	H	H	A	H	A	A	H	A	A	H	A	H	H	A	A	H	A	H	A	H	A	H	A	H	A	H	A	H	A	H	A	H	A	A	H	A	H
Result	L	L	L	D	L	L	W	L	L	L	L	L	L	W	L	D	L	W	L	L	D	L	D	L	L	L	L	D	W	D	D	L	D	W	D	L	L	L
Position	19	18	20	19	19	19	18	18	18	19	19	20	20	19	19	19	19	19	19	19	19	19	19	19	19	19	19	19	19	19	19	19	19	19	19	19	19	19
Points	0	0	0	1	1	1	4	4	4	4	4	4	4	7	7	8	8	11	11	11	12	12	13	13	13	13	13	14	17	18	19	19	20	23	24	24	24	24

Source: Soccerway
A = Away; H = Home; W = Win; D = Draw; L = Loss
Notes:
- ^{1} Matchday 2 (vs Luton Town) was postponed due renovation works at Kenilworth Road.

==== Matches ====
Win Draw Loss

Premier League match details
Date	Opponents	Venue	Result	Score F–A	Scorers	Attendance	Ref.
11 August 2023	Manchester City	H	L	0–3	—	21,572	
27 August 2023	Aston Villa	H	L	1–3	Foster 47'	21,591	
2 September 2023	Tottenham Hotspur	H	L	2–5	Foster 4', Brownhill 90+4'	21,750	
18 September 2023	Nottingham Forest	A	D	1–1	Amdouni 41'	28,958	
23 September 2023	Manchester United	H	L	0–1	—	21,593	
30 September 2023	Newcastle United	A	L	0–2	—	52,163	
3 October 2023	Luton Town	A	W	2–1	Foster 45+2', Bruun Larsen 85'	10,918	
7 October 2023	Chelsea	H	L	1–4	Odobert 15'	21,654	
21 October 2023	Brentford	A	L	0–3	—	17,029	
28 October 2023	Bournemouth	A	L	1–2	Taylor 11'	11,152	
4 November 2023	Crystal Palace	H	L	0–2	—	21,578	
11 November 2023	Arsenal	A	L	1–3	Brownhill 54'	60,232	
25 November 2023	West Ham United	H	L	1–2	Rodriguez 49' (pen.)	21,319	
2 December 2023	Sheffield United	H	W	5–0	Rodriguez 1', Bruun Larsen 29', Amdouni 73', Koleosho 75', Brownhill 80'	20,891	
5 December 2023	Wolverhampton Wanderers	A	L	0–1	—	30,439	
9 December 2023	Brighton & Hove Albion	A	D	1–1	Odobert 45'	32,511	
16 December 2023	Everton	H	L	0–2	—	21,413	
23 December 2023	Fulham	A	W	2–0	Odobert 47', Berge 66'	23,598	
26 December 2023	Liverpool	H	L	0–2	—	21,624	
30 December 2023	Aston Villa	A	L	2–3	Amdouni 30', Foster 71'	41,613	
12 January 2024	Luton Town	H	D	1–1	Amdouni 36'	20,155	
31 January 2024	Manchester City	A	L	1–3	Al-Dakhil 90+3'	53,099	
3 February 2024	Fulham	H	D	2–2	Fofana 71', 90+1'	20,203	
10 February 2024	Liverpool	A	L	1–3	O'Shea 45'	59,896	
17 February 2024	Arsenal	H	L	0–5	—	21,311	
24 February 2024	Crystal Palace	A	L	0–3	—	24,042	
3 March 2024	Bournemouth	H	L	0–2	—	19,713	
10 March 2024	West Ham United	A	D	2–2	Fofana 11', Mavropanos 45+1' (o.g.)	62,441	
16 March 2024	Brentford	H	W	2–1	Bruun Larsen 10' (pen.), Fofana 62'	20,431	
30 March 2024	Chelsea	A	D	2–2	Cullen 47', O'Shea 81'	39,535	
2 April 2024	Wolverhampton Wanderers	H	D	1–1	Bruun Larsen 37'	21,528	
6 April 2024	Everton	A	L	0–1	—	39,125	
13 April 2024	Brighton & Hove Albion	H	D	1–1	Brownhill 74'	20,687	
20 April 2024	Sheffield United	A	W	4–1	Bruun Larsen 38', Assignon 40', Foster 58', Guðmundsson 71'	28,964	
27 April 2024	Manchester United	A	D	1–1	Amdouni 87' (pen.)	73,571	
4 May 2024	Newcastle United	H	L	1–4	O'Shea 86'	21,781	
11 May 2024	Tottenham Hotspur	A	L	1–2	Bruun Larsen 25'	61,148	
19 May 2024	Nottingham Forest	H	L	1–2	Cullen 72'	21,109	

=== FA Cup ===
Burnley entered the FA Cup in the third round, and were drawn away to Tottenham Hotspur.

Win Draw Loss

FA Cup match details
Date	Opponents	Venue	Result	Score F–A	Scorers	Attendance	Ref.
5 January 2024	Tottenham Hotspur	A	L	0–1	—	60,982	

=== EFL Cup ===
Burnley entered the competition in the second round, and were drawn away to Nottingham Forest. They were then drawn away to Salford City in the third round, and away to Everton in the fourth round.

Win Draw Loss

EFL Cup match details
Date	Opponents	Venue	Result	Score F–A	Scorers	Attendance	Ref.
30 August 2023	Nottingham Forest	A	W	1–0	Amdouni 90'	27,766	
26 September 2023	Salford City	A	W	4–0	Berge 12', Bruun Larsen 20', O'Shea 27', Odobert 81'	3,305	
1 November 2023	Everton	A	L	0–3	—	38,841	

== Statistics ==
=== Appearances and goals ===
No.	Pos	Nat	Player	Total		Premier League		FA Cup		EFL Cup	
No.	Pos	Nat	Player	Apps	Goals	Apps	Goals	Apps	Goals	Apps	Goals
1	GK	(England) ENG	James Trafford	28	0	28	0	0	0	0	0
2	DF	(Republic of Ireland) IRL	Dara O'Shea	37	4	32+1	3	1	0	3	1
3	DF	(England) ENG	Charlie Taylor	30	1	25+3	1	1	0	1	0
4	MF	(England) ENG	Jack Cork	6	0	0+4	0	0	0	1+1	0
5	DF	(Germany) GER	Jordan Beyer	15	0	15	0	0	0	0	0
7	MF	(Iceland) ISL	Jóhann Berg Guðmundsson	27	1	12+14	1	0	0	1	0
8	MF	(England) ENG	Josh Brownhill	35	4	23+10	4	0+1	0	1	0
9	FW	(England) ENG	Jay Rodriguez	24	2	7+14	2	0	0	3	0
10	MF	(Belgium) BEL	Manuel Benson	9	0	1+7	0	0	0	1	0
15	MF	(England) ENG	Nathan Redmond	15	0	0+12	0	0+1	0	2	0
16	MF	(Norway) NOR	Sander Berge	40	2	34+3	1	0	0	2+1	1
17	FW	(South Africa) RSA	Lyle Foster	26	5	22+2	5	1	0	0+1	0
18	DF	(Sweden) SWE	Hjalmar Ekdal	9	0	5+3	0	0	0	1	0
20	DF	(France) FRA	Lorenz Assignon	15	1	15	1	0	0	0	0
21	MF	(England) ENG	Aaron Ramsey	17	0	5+9	0	1	0	1+1	0
22	DF	(Brazil) BRA	Vitinho	36	0	26+6	0	1	0	3	0
23	FW	(Ivory Coast) CIV	David Datro Fofana	15	4	10+5	4	0	0	0	0
24	MF	(Republic of Ireland) IRL	Josh Cullen	28	2	23+2	2	1	0	1+1	0
25	FW	(Switzerland) SUI	Zeki Amdouni	37	5	27+7	5	1	0	0+2	0
28	DF	(Belgium) BEL	Ameen Al-Dakhil	17	1	12+1	1	0+1	0	1+2	0
30	FW	(Italy) ITA	Luca Koleosho	15	1	13+2	1	0	0	0	0
31	FW	(Belgium) BEL	Mike Trésor	19	0	3+13	0	0+1	0	1+1	0
33	DF	(France) FRA	Maxime Estève	16	0	15+1	0	0	0	0	0
34	FW	(Denmark) DEN	Jacob Bruun Larsen	35	7	16+15	6	0+1	0	3	1
42	MF	(France) FRA	Han-Noah Massengo	4	0	0+3	0	0	0	0+1	0
44	DF	(Belgium) BEL	Hannes Delcroix	15	0	5+7	0	1	0	2	0
47	FW	(France) FRA	Wilson Odobert	34	4	25+5	3	1	0	1+2	1
49	GK	(Kosovo) KOS	Arijanet Muric	14	0	10	0	1	0	3	0
Players who featured but departed the club during the season:
14	DF	(Wales) WAL	Connor Roberts	16	0	8+6	0	0	0	0+2	0
19	FW	(Morocco) MAR	Anass Zaroury	9	0	1+5	0	1	0	1+1	0
45	FW	(Republic of Ireland) IRL	Michael Obafemi	2	0	0+2	0	0	0	0	0
