= CJ Egan-Riley =

English footballer (born 2003)

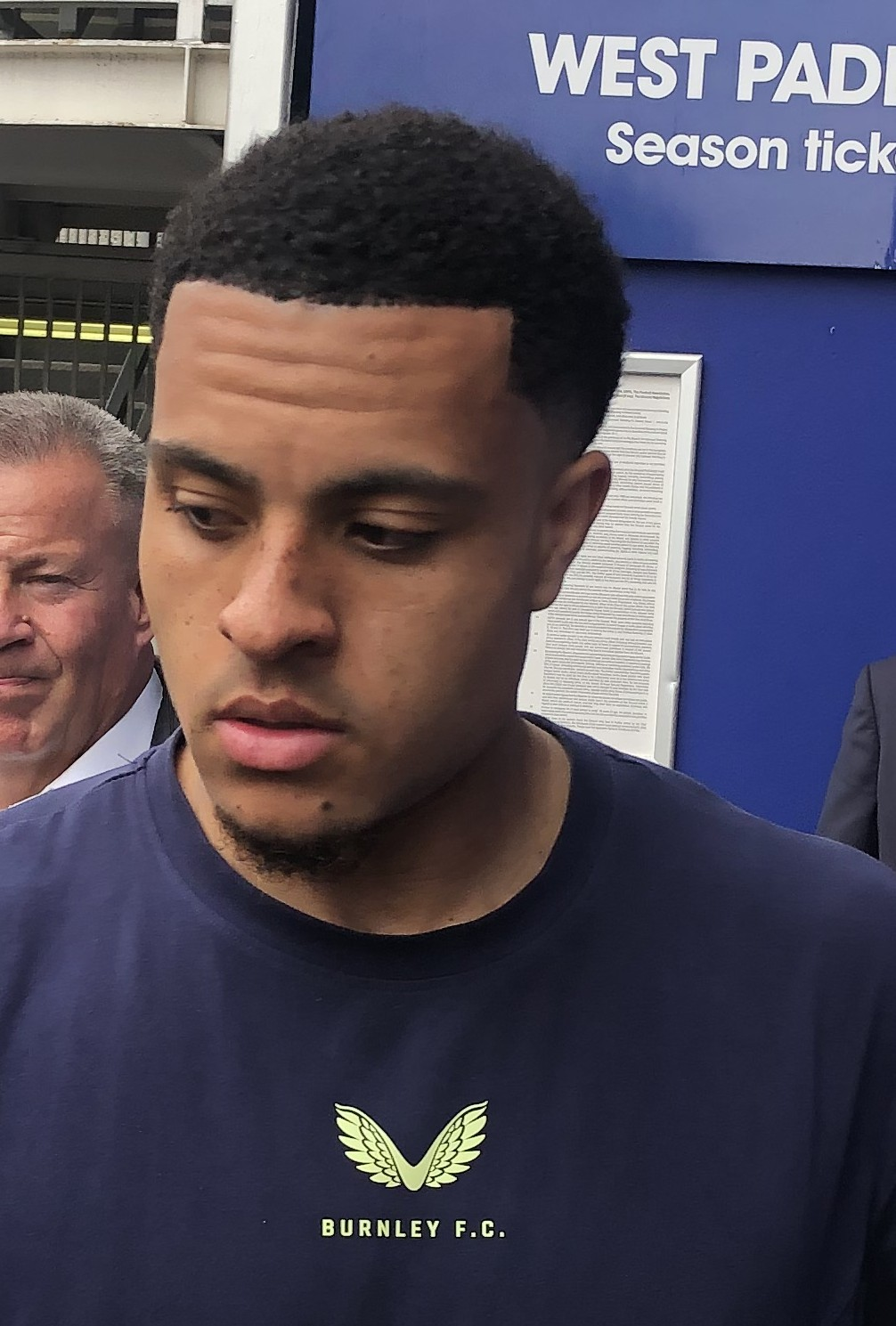
- Egan-Riley with Burnley in 2025

Personal information
- Full name: Conrad Jaden Egan-Riley
- Date of birth: 2 January 2003 (age 23)
- Place of birth: Manchester, England
- Height: 1.83 m (6 ft 0 in)
- Position: Defender

Team information
- Current team: Marseille
- Number: 4

Youth career
- 2010–2021: Manchester City

Senior career*
Years	Team	Apps	(Gls)
2021–2022	Manchester City	1	(0)
2022–2025	Burnley	44	(1)
2023	→ Hibernian (loan)	14	(0)
2024	→ Jong PSV (loan)	13	(0)
2025–	Marseille	22	(1)

International career^{‡}
2018	England U15	4	(0)
2018	Republic of Ireland U16	2	(0)
2018–2019	England U16	6	(0)
2019	England U17	5	(0)
2021	England U18	1	(0)
2021	England U19	3	(0)
2025	England U21	3	(0)
Medal record
Men's football
Representing England
UEFA European Under-21 Championship
Winner	2025 Slovakia
- * Club domestic league appearances and goals as of 21:45, 22 November 2026 (UTC) ‡ National team caps and goals as of 19:19, 29 June 2025 (UTC)

Conrad Jaden Egan-Riley (born 2 January 2003) is an English professional footballer who plays for Ligue 1 club Marseille and the England under-21 national team. A versatile player, he can be deployed as a centre-back, a right-back or a defensive midfielder.

Egan-Riley started his career with Manchester City, and has represented both England and the Republic of Ireland in youth internationals.

== Club career ==
=== Manchester City ===
A Manchester local, Egan-Riley has been training with Manchester City for over a decade. On 21 September 2021, he made his professional debut when he was named in the starting line up for Manchester City's EFL Cup tie against Wycombe Wanderers. He made his UEFA Champions League debut on 9 March 2022 in a 0–0 home draw against Sporting CP in the Round of 16. On 8 May 2022, Egan-Riley made his Premier League debut as a second half-time substituted player in a 5–0 home win over Newcastle United.

=== Burnley ===
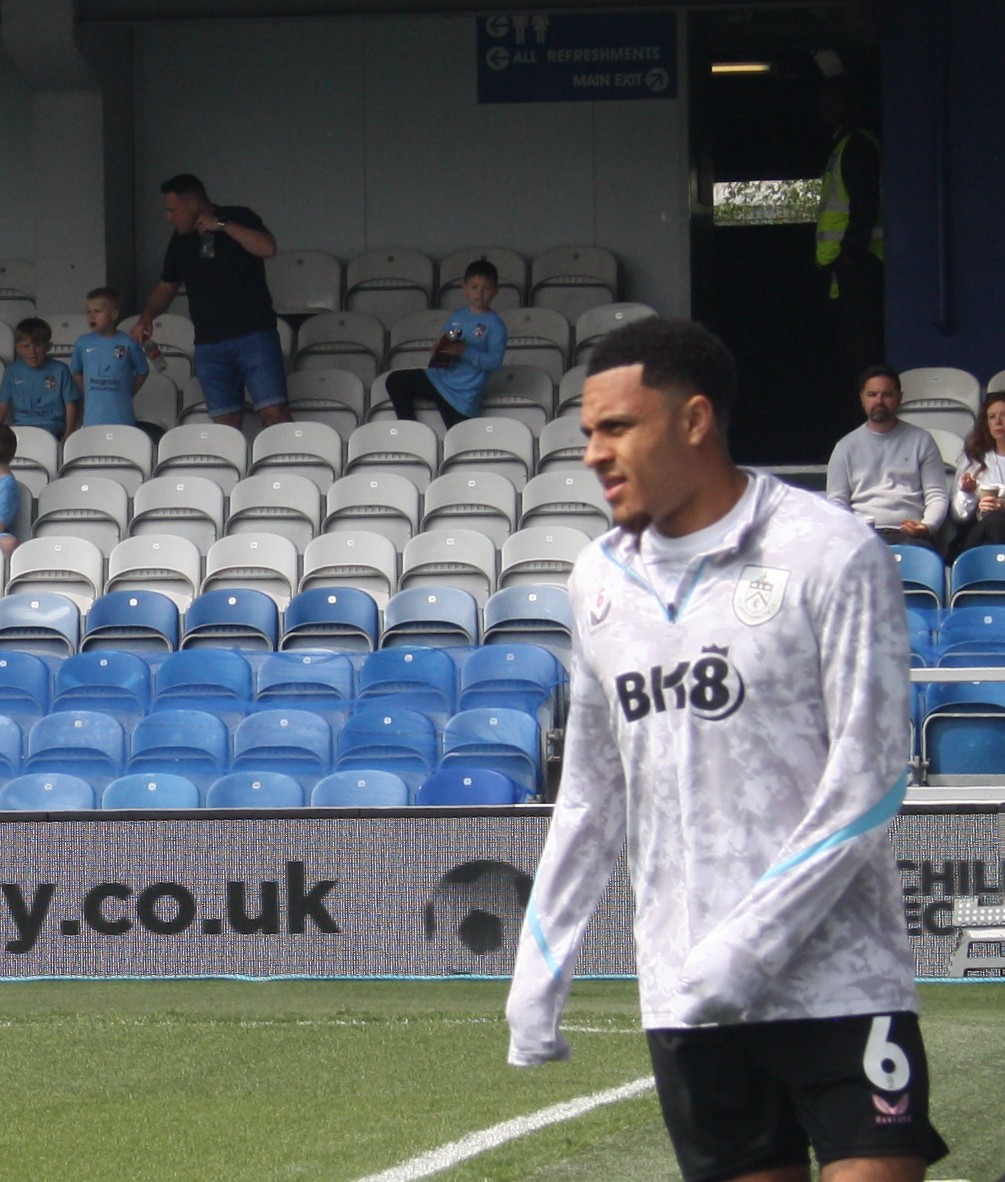
CJ Egan-Riley warming up in 2025.

On 1 July 2022, Burnley announced they had signed Egan-Riley on a permanent transfer from Manchester City. On 23 August 2022, he made his debut for the club, starting in a 1–0 win against Shrewsbury Town in the EFL Cup.

==== Hibernian (loan) ====
Egan-Riley was loaned to Scottish club Hibernian until the end of the season on 30 January 2023. He made his debut for the club the next day on 31 January 2023, in a 1–1 draw with Ross County in the Scottish Premiership.

==== PSV Eindhoven (loan) ====
On 1 February 2024, Egan-Riley joined Eredivisie side PSV on loan until the end of the season. He was assigned to their youth team Jong PSV that plays in the second-tier Eerste Divisie. He made his debut for Jong PSV on 9 February 2024, starting in a 3–0 win against Emmen. On 21 May 2024, Burnley announced the player would be returning once the loan ended.

==== Return to Burnley ====
On 26 November 2024, Egan-Riley scored his first goal for Burnley in a 2–0 win against Coventry City in the EFL Championship. Having established himself as part of Burnley's record-breaking defence in the 2024–25 season, Egan-Riley was named EFL Young Player of the Month for February 2025 following five clean sheets in the league. Following his performances during the season, Egan-Riley was named in the 2024–25 EFL Championship Team of the Season.

On 20 May 2025, Burnley said it was discussing a new contract with the player. On 11 June, the club announced that he had rejected a contract offer to pursue an opportunity in France.

=== Marseille ===
On 14 June 2025, Egan-Riley signed a contract with Ligue 1 club Marseille.

== International career ==
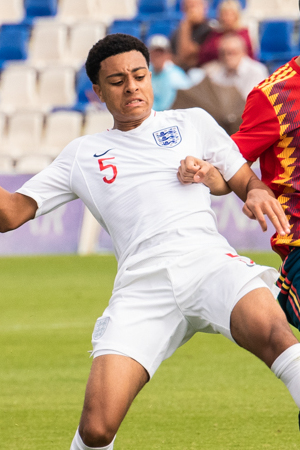
Egan-Riley playing for England U17 in 2019.

Born in England, Egan-Riley is of Irish and Jamaican descent. He has represented England at every level from under-15 to under-19. He is also eligible to play for the Republic of Ireland through ancestry and represented them in the 2018 Victory Shield.

On 14 March 2025, Egan-Riley received his first call-up to the England U21 side. He made his debut on 21 March 2025, starting in a 5–3 defeat to France U21. Egan-Riley was included in the England squad for the 2025 UEFA European Under-21 Championship. He came on as a substitute in extra time during the final as England defeated Germany to win the tournament.

== Career statistics ==
As of match played 8 November 2026

Appearances and goals by club, season and competition
Club	Season	League			National cup (Note: Includes FA Cup, Coupe de France)		League cup (Note: Includes EFL Cup)		Europe		Other		Total	
Club	Season	Division	Apps	Goals	Apps	Goals	Apps	Goals	Apps	Goals	Apps	Goals	Apps	Goals
Manchester City U21	2020–21	—			—		—		—		3 (Note: Appearances in EFL Trophy)	0	3	0
Manchester City U21	2021–22	—			—		—		—		1	0	1	0
Manchester City U21	Total		—		—		—		—		4	0	4	0
Manchester City	2021–22	Premier League	1	0	0	0	1	0	1 (Note: Appearances in UEFA Champions League)	0	0	0	3	0
Burnley	2022–23	Championship	3	0	0	0	3	0	—		—		6	0
Burnley	2023–24	Premier League	0	0	0	0	0	0	—		—		0	0
Burnley	2024–25	Championship	41	1	1	0	1	0	—		—		43	1
Burnley	Total		44	1	1	0	4	0	—		—		49	1
Hibernian (loan)	2022–23	Scottish Premiership	14	0	—		—		—		—		14	0
Jong PSV (loan)	2023–24	Eerste Divisie	13	0	—		—		—		—		13	0
Marseille	2025–26	Ligue 1	11	0	2	0	—		3	0	0	0	16	0
Marseille	2026–27	Ligue 1	10	1	0	0	—		3 (Note: Appearances in UEFA Europa League)	0	—		13	1
Marseille	Total		21	1	2	0	—		6	0	0	0	29	1
Career total			93	2	3	0	5	0	7	0	4	0	112	2

== Honours ==
Burnley

- EFL Championship second-place promotion: 2024–25

England U21

- UEFA European Under-21 Championship: 2025

Individual

- EFL Young Player of the Month: February 2025
- EFL Championship Team of the Season: 2024–25
- PFA Team of the Year: 2024–25 Championship
