= Lyle Foster =

South African soccer player (born 2000)

- Foster with Houston Dynamo in 2026

Personal information
- Full name: Lyle Brent Foster
- Date of birth: 3 September 2000 (age 26)
- Place of birth: Soweto, South Africa
- Height: 1.85 m (6 ft 1 in)
- Position: Forward

Team information
- Current team: Houston Dynamo (on loan from Burnley)
- Number: 9

Youth career
- –2017: Orlando Pirates

Senior career*
Years	Team	Apps	(Gls)
2017–2019	Orlando Pirates	11	(1)
2019	Monaco II	8	(3)
2019–2020	Monaco	2	(0)
2019–2020	→ Cercle Brugge (loan)	18	(1)
2020–2022	Vitória de Guimarães	5	(0)
2021	Vitória de Guimarães B	4	(0)
2021–2022	→ Westerlo (loan)	23	(4)
2022–2023	Westerlo	21	(8)
2023–	Burnley	89	(11)
2026–	→ Houston Dynamo (loan)	8	(1)

International career^{‡}
2016	South Africa U17	4	(1)
2017–2019	South Africa U20	7	(5)
2018	South Africa B	3	(0)
2019–2021	South Africa U23	6	(0)
2020–	South Africa	32	(11)
- * Club domestic league appearances and goals as of 17:53, 9 November 2026 (UTC) ‡ National team caps and goals as of 14:33, 18 November 2026 (UTC)

Lyle Brent Foster (born 3 September 2000) is a South African professional soccer player who plays as a forward for Major League Soccer club Houston Dynamo, on loan from EFL Championship club Burnley, and the South Africa national team.

== Club career ==
Foster was promoted to the Orlando Pirates' first team for the 2017–18 season. On 15 September 2017, he made his professional debut against Maritzburg United. On 22 January 2018, he scored his first goal for Orlando Pirates in a 1–1 draw against Polokwane City.

He signed for Monaco in January 2019 on a deal until June 2023, where he would begin on the reserve team.

On 30 August 2019, Foster joined Monaco's feeder club Cercle Brugge in Belgium on a season-long loan.

On 13 August 2020, Foster joined Vitória de Guimarães for a transfer fee of 1.2 million euro. In 2021, he joined Westerlo on a season-long loan with an option-to-buy.

In the summer of 2022, Foster moved to Westerlo on a permanent basis and signed a four-year contract with the club.

In January 2023, Foster signed for EFL Championship club Burnley on a four-and-a-half-year contract. The transfer fee paid to Westerlo was reported as €7 million, a record for a South African player, which rose to €10 million after the Clarets guaranteed promotion to the Premier League.

On 26 October 2023, Foster signed a new five-year contract with Burnley. In November 2023, he was ruled out for an indefinite period following the reoccurrence of a mental health issue. He made his return after a two-month break when Burnley faced Everton, and went on to score in their final fixture of the year against Aston Villa. Following his return, Foster regained his place in the Burnley squad and continued to feature regularly for the club. He later spoke about the support he received from Burnley during his absence, saying that the club helped him through a difficult period and allowed him time to recover before returning to football.

On 3 September 2026, Foster joined Major League Soccer side Houston Dynamo FC on loan until the end of June 2027, with an option to make the transfer permanent. Foster scored on his first start with the club against Minnesota United on 10 October.

== International career ==
On 1 December 2025, Foster was called up to the South Africa squad for the 2025 Africa Cup of Nations.

On 28 May 2026, he was selected by manager Hugo Broos to represent his nation at the 2026 FIFA World Cup.

== Personal life ==
Foster was born in Soweto in the City of Johannesburg Metropolitan Municipality on 3 September 2000.

== Career statistics ==
=== Club ===
As of match played 7 November 2026

Appearances and goals by club, season and competition
Club	Season	League			National cup (Note: Includes Nedbank Cup, Belgian Cup, Taça de Portugal, FA Cup)		League cup (Note: Includes Taça da Liga, EFL Cup)		Other		Total	
Club	Season	Division	Apps	Goals	Apps	Goals	Apps	Goals	Apps	Goals	Apps	Goals
Orlando Pirates	2017–18	South African Premiership	9	1	2	0	0	0	0	0	11	1
Monaco II	2018–19	Championnat National 2	8	3	—		—		—		8	3
Monaco	2018–19	Ligue 1	0	0	0	0	0	0	0	0	0	0
Monaco	2019–20	Ligue 1	2	0	—		—		—		2	0
Monaco	Total		2	0	0	0	0	0	0	0	2	0
Cercle Brugge (loan)	2019–20	Belgian Pro League	18	1	1	0	—		—		19	1
Vitória de Guimarães B	2020–21	Campeonato de Portugal	4	0	—		—		—		4	0
Vitória de Guimarães	2020–21	Primeira Liga	5	0	1	0	1	0	—		7	0
Westerlo (loan)	2021–22	Belgian First Division B	23	4	3	1	—		—		26	5
Westerlo	2022–23	Belgian Pro League	21	8	0	0	—		—		21	8
Burnley	2022–23	Championship	11	1	4	0	—		—		15	1
Burnley	2023–24	Premier League	24	5	1	0	1	0	—		26	5
Burnley	2024–25	Championship	28	2	2	1	1	0	—		31	3
Burnley	2025–26	Premier League	26	3	1	0	0	0	—		27	3
Burnley	Total		89	11	8	1	2	0	—		99	12
Houston Dynamo (loan)	2026	Major League Soccer	8	1	—		—		0	0	8	1
Career total			187	29	15	2	3	0	0	0	205	31

=== International ===
As of match played 17 November 2026

Appearances and goals by national team and year
National team	Year	Apps	Goals
South Africa	2020	2	0
South Africa	2021	1	0
South Africa	2022	3	1
South Africa	2023	5	3
South Africa	2024	4	2
South Africa	2025	9	4
South Africa	2026	8	1
Total		32	11

As of match played 17 November 2026
South Africa score listed first, score column indicates score after each Foster goal.

List of international goals scored by Lyle Foster
No.	Date	Venue	Cap	Opponent	Score	Result	Competition	Ref.
1	9 June 2022	Prince Moulay Abdellah Stadium, Rabat, Morocco	6	Morocco	1–0	1–2	2023 Africa Cup of Nations qualification	
2	24 March 2023	Orlando Stadium, Johannesburg, South Africa	7	Liberia	1–0	2–2	2023 Africa Cup of Nations qualification	
3	24 March 2023	Orlando Stadium, Johannesburg, South Africa	7	Liberia	2–0	2–2	2023 Africa Cup of Nations qualification	
4	12 September 2023	Orlando Stadium, Johannesburg, South Africa	9	DR Congo	1–0	1–0	Friendly	
5	6 September 2024	Orlando Stadium, Johannesburg, South Africa	13	Uganda	1–0	2–2	2025 Africa Cup of Nations qualification	
6	11 October 2024	Nelson Mandela Bay Stadium, Gqeberha, South Africa	15	Congo	4–0	5–0	2025 Africa Cup of Nations qualification	
7	25 March 2025	Felix Houphouet Boigny Stadium, Abidjan, Ivory Coast	17	Benin	1–0	2–0	2026 FIFA World Cup qualification	
8	5 September 2025	Free State Stadium, Bloemfontein, South Africa	18	Lesotho	2–0	3–0	2026 FIFA World Cup qualification	
9	22 December 2025	Marrakesh Stadium, Marrakesh, Morocco	22	Angola	2–1	2–1	2025 Africa Cup of Nations	
10	29 December 2025	Marrakesh Stadium, Marrakesh, Morocco	24	Zimbabwe	2–1	3–2	2025 Africa Cup of Nations	
11	6 June 2026	Estadio Hidalgo, Pachuca, Mexico	29	Jamaica	1–0	1–1	Friendly	

== Honours ==
=== Westerlo ===
- Belgian First Division B: 2021–22

=== Burnley ===
- EFL Championship: 2022–23; runner–up: 2024–25

=== South Africa U20 ===
- COSAFA U-20 Cup: 2017
