= Joe Bevan =

Scottish professional footballer

Personal information
- Full name: Joseph Brooks Bevan
- Date of birth: 15 July 2004 (age 22)
- Position: Striker

Team information
- Current team: Dundee
- Number: 27

Youth career
- Kilsyth Athletic

Senior career*
| Years | Team | Apps | (Gls) |
| 2022–2023 | Camelon Juniors | | |
| 2023–2024 | Albion Rovers | | |
| 2024–2026 | Burnley | 0 | (0) |
| 2025 | → Carlisle United (loan) | 14 | (0) |
| 2026– | Dundee | 18 | (2) |
- * Club domestic league appearances and goals as of 22:01, 21 November 2026 (UTC)

Joseph Brooks Bevan (born 15 July 2004) is a Scottish professional footballer who plays as a striker for Scottish Premiership club Dundee.

== Career ==
After playing for Kilsyth Athletic and Camelon Juniors, Bevan signed for Albion Rovers in January 2023.

After a trial with Burnley in December 2023, he signed for the club in January 2024 on an 18-month contract.

In January 2025 he moved on loan to Carlisle United.

On 2 January 2026, Bevan joined Scottish Premiership club Dundee on a two-and-a-half year deal. On 25 January, Bevan made his debut for Dundee off the bench in a league game away to Rangers.

On 11 July 2026, Bevan scored his first and Dundee's first goal of the season against Airdrieonians, and scored his second goal three days later against Annan Athletic.

== Career statistics ==
As of match played 21 November 2026

Appearances and goals by club, season and competition
| Club | Season | League | | | National cup | | League cup | | Other | | Total | |
| Club | Season | Division | Apps | Goals | Apps | Goals | Apps | Goals | Apps | Goals | Apps | Goals |
|---|---|---|---|---|---|---|---|---|---|---|---|---|
| Burnley | 2023–24 | Premier League | 0 | 0 | 0 | 0 | 0 | 0 | — | | 0 | 0 |
| Burnley | 2024–25 | EFL Championship | 0 | 0 | 0 | 0 | 0 | 0 | — | | 0 | 0 |
| Burnley | 2025–26 | Premier League | 0 | 0 | 0 | 0 | 0 | 0 | — | | 0 | 0 |
| Burnley | Total | | 0 | 0 | 0 | 0 | 0 | 0 | 0 | 0 | 0 | 0 |
| Carlisle United (loan) | 2024–25 | EFL League Two | 14 | 0 | 0 | 0 | 0 | 0 | 0 | 0 | 14 | 0 |
| Dundee | 2025–26 | Scottish Premiership | 5 | 0 | 1 (Note: Bevan's appearance in the Scottish Cup on 7 February 2026 is not listed at Soccerbase, but is confirmed by Dundee F.C.'s match report) | 0 | — | | 0 | 0 | 6 | 0 |
| Dundee | 2026–27 | Scottish Premiership | 13 | 2 | 0 | 0 | 5 | 2 | — | | 18 | 4 |
| Dundee | Total | | 18 | 2 | 1 | 0 | 5 | 2 | 0 | 0 | 24 | 4 |
| Career total | | | 32 | 2 | 1 | 0 | 5 | 2 | 0 | 0 | 38 | 4 |
