= Joe Westley =

English footballer (born 2004)

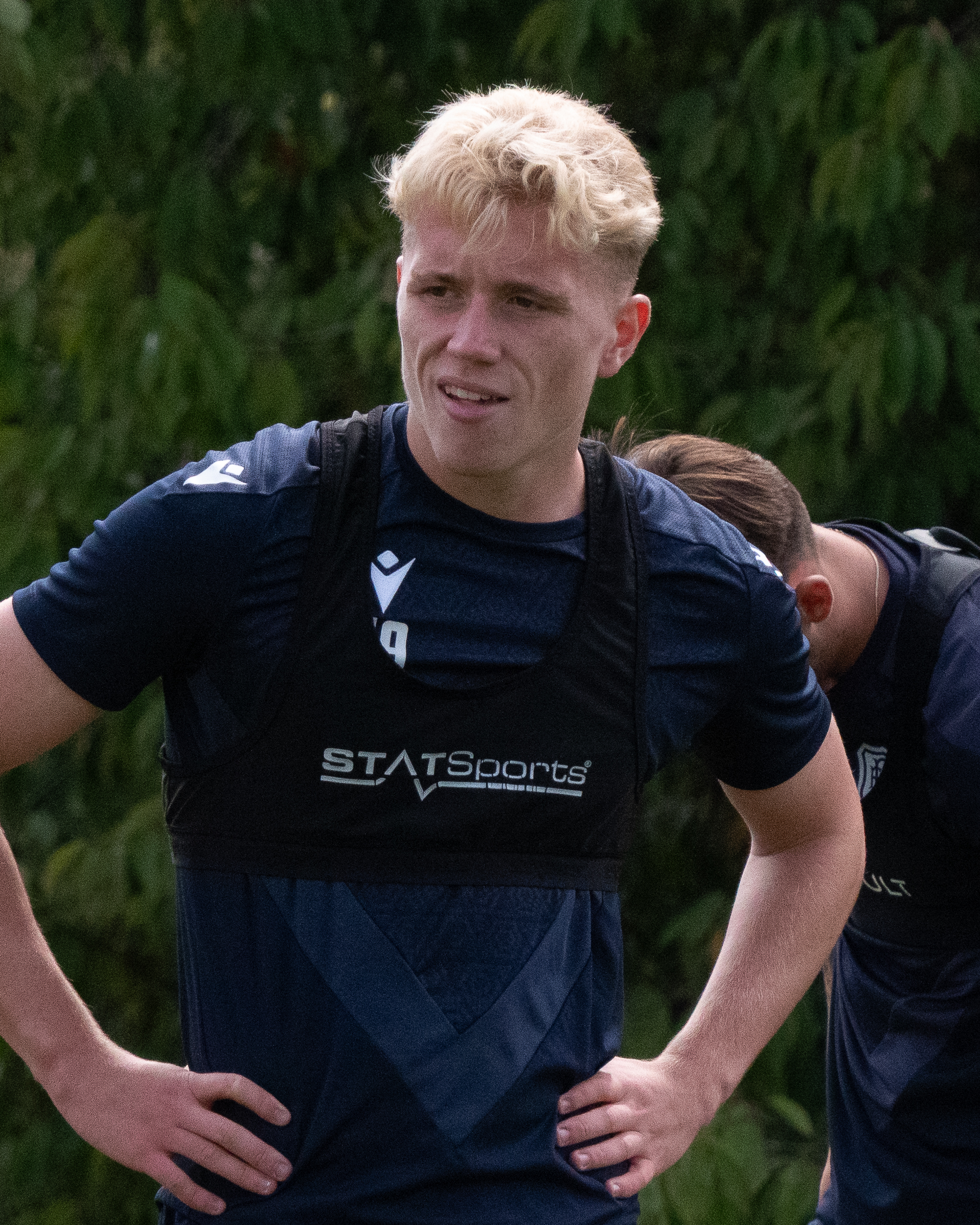
- Westley training for Dundee in 2025

Personal information
- Full name: Joseph Anthony Westley
- Date of birth: 18 October 2004 (age 22)
- Place of birth: Kingston upon Thames, England
- Position: Striker

Team information
- Current team: Dundee
- Number: 19

Youth career
- –2021: Fulham
- 2021–2023: Burnley

Senior career*
Years	Team	Apps	(Gls)
2023–2025	Burnley	0	(0)
2024	→ AFC Fylde (loan)	13	(3)
2024	→ Rochdale (loan)	3	(0)
2025	→ Swindon Town (loan)	17	(3)
2025–	Dundee	33	(8)
- * Club domestic league appearances and goals as of 21:55, 21 November 2026 (UTC)

Joseph Anthony Westley (born 18 October 2004) is an English professional footballer who plays for Scottish Premiership club Dundee, as a striker.

== Career ==
Westley started his career in the youth team at Fulham, but following his release in the summer, he signed for Burnley in August 2021 on a two-year scholarship. He initially struggled with injury problems but became a key part of Tony Philliskirk's youth team towards the end of the 2021–22 season. In the 2022–23 season he was elected as youth team captain and after scoring 20 goals in 21 matches he was rewarded with his first professional contract in January 2023, signing a two-and-a-half year deal.

In January 2024 he went on his first loan to National League side AFC Fylde for the remainder of the season, with the Coasters in the relegation places. He moved on loan to Rochdale in September 2024. Westley signed on loan for Swindon Town in January 2025. He scored on his debut for the club on 24 January 2025, coming off the bench to score the winning goal in a 2–1 away win at Newport County. Westley said he wanted to score more goals for the club.

On 5 August 2025, Westley signed a 3-year deal with Scottish Premiership club Dundee. On 20 September, Westley scored his first goal for the club in a home league win over Livingston.

== Personal life ==
His father is former player turned manager Graham Westley.

== Career statistics ==
As of match played on 21 November 2026

Appearances and goals by club, season and competition
Club	Season	League			National cup		League cup		Other		Total	
Club	Season	Division	Apps	Goals	Apps	Goals	Apps	Goals	Apps	Goals	Apps	Goals
Burnley	2023–24	Premier League	0	0	0	0	0	0	—		0	0
Burnley	2024–25	Championship	0	0	0	0	0	0	—		0	0
Burnley	Total		0	0	0	0	0	0	0	0	0	0
AFC Fylde (loan)	2023–24	National League	13	3	—		—		—		13	3
Rochdale (loan)	2024–25	National League	3	0	—		—		—		3	0
Swindon Town (loan)	2024–25 (Note: Soccerbase does not include Westley's game and goal on 24 January 2025, which is included by Soccerway and verified by match reports)	League Two	17	3	—		—		—		17	3
Dundee	2025–26	Scottish Premiership	23	4	0	0	0	0	—		23	4
Dundee	2026–27	Scottish Premiership	10	4	0	0	4	2	—		14	6
Dundee	Total		33	8	0	0	4	2	0	0	37	10
Career total			66	14	0	0	4	2	0	0	70	16
