= Josh Brownhill =

English footballer (born 1995)

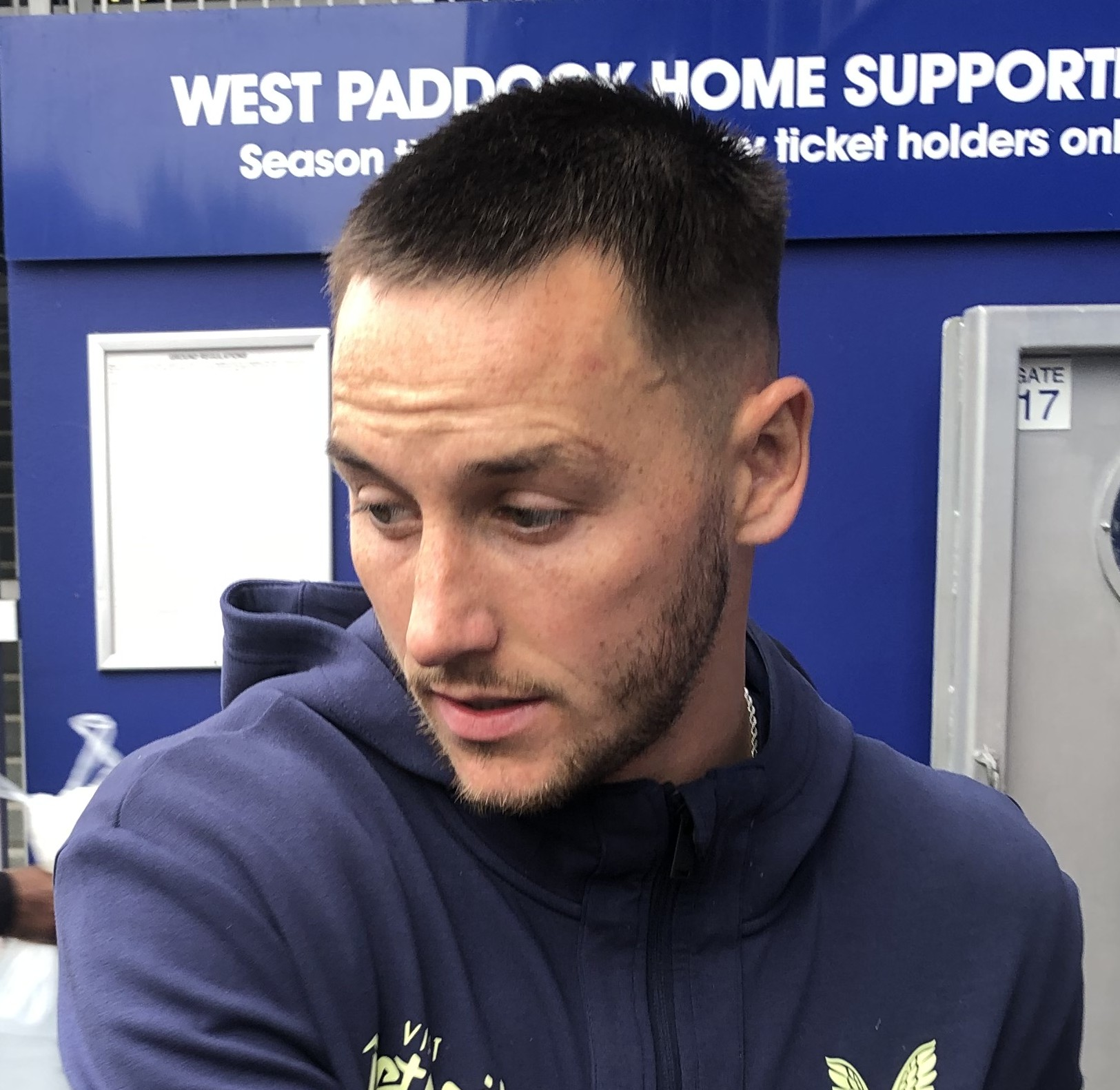
- Brownhill in 2025

Personal information
- Full name: Joshua Brownhill
- Date of birth: 19 December 1995 (age 30)
- Place of birth: Warrington, Cheshire
- Height: 5 ft 11 in (1.80 m)
- Position: Midfielder

Team information
- Current team: Al Shabab
- Number: 8

Youth career
- –2012: Manchester United
- 2012–2013: Preston North End

Senior career*
Years	Team	Apps	(Gls)
2013–2016	Preston North End	45	(5)
2016	→ Barnsley (loan)	22	(2)
2016–2020	Bristol City	145	(16)
2020–2025	Burnley	194	(31)
2025–	Al Shabab	41	(8)
- * Club domestic league appearances and goals as of 21:19, 30 October 2026 (UTC)

Joshua Brownhill (born 19 December 1995) is an English footballer who plays as a midfielder for Saudi Pro League club Al Shabab. He is most known for his time at Burnley and has previously played for Preston North End, Barnsley and Bristol City.

== Early and personal life ==
Brownhill was born in Warrington, Cheshire and attended Birchwood Community High School.

In December 2024, rumours circulated that Brownhill was eligible to play for Malaysia at international level. This caused a frenzy on social media, resulting in Regent of Johor Tunku Ismail messaging Brownhill about the situation. However, Brownhill denied these rumours in an Instagram post, stating that his only nationality was English.

== Career ==
=== Preston North End ===
A former Manchester United schoolboy player, Brownhill joined the Preston North End youth team at the start of the 2012–13 season. He made his first team debut on 8 October 2013, as a late substitute in a Football League Trophy defeat against Oldham Athletic.

Brownhill scored the winning goal in his first League One start against Gillingham on 19 October 2013, and drew praise from manager Simon Grayson for his overall performance. He went on to notch an additional two goals in 2013 against Crawley Town and Carlisle United. The goal against Carlisle won the club's Goal of 2013 Award, after a 13 pass move in which every outfield player touched the ball at least once.

On 14 January 2016, Brownhill joined League One club Barnsley on an initial month-long loan deal, and went straight into the starting line-up for Barnsley's next game against Shrewsbury Town. On 1 February 2016 Brownhill's loan was extended to the end of the season. He scored his first goal for Barnsley in a 3–1 win over Walsall on 5 March 2016.

=== Bristol City ===
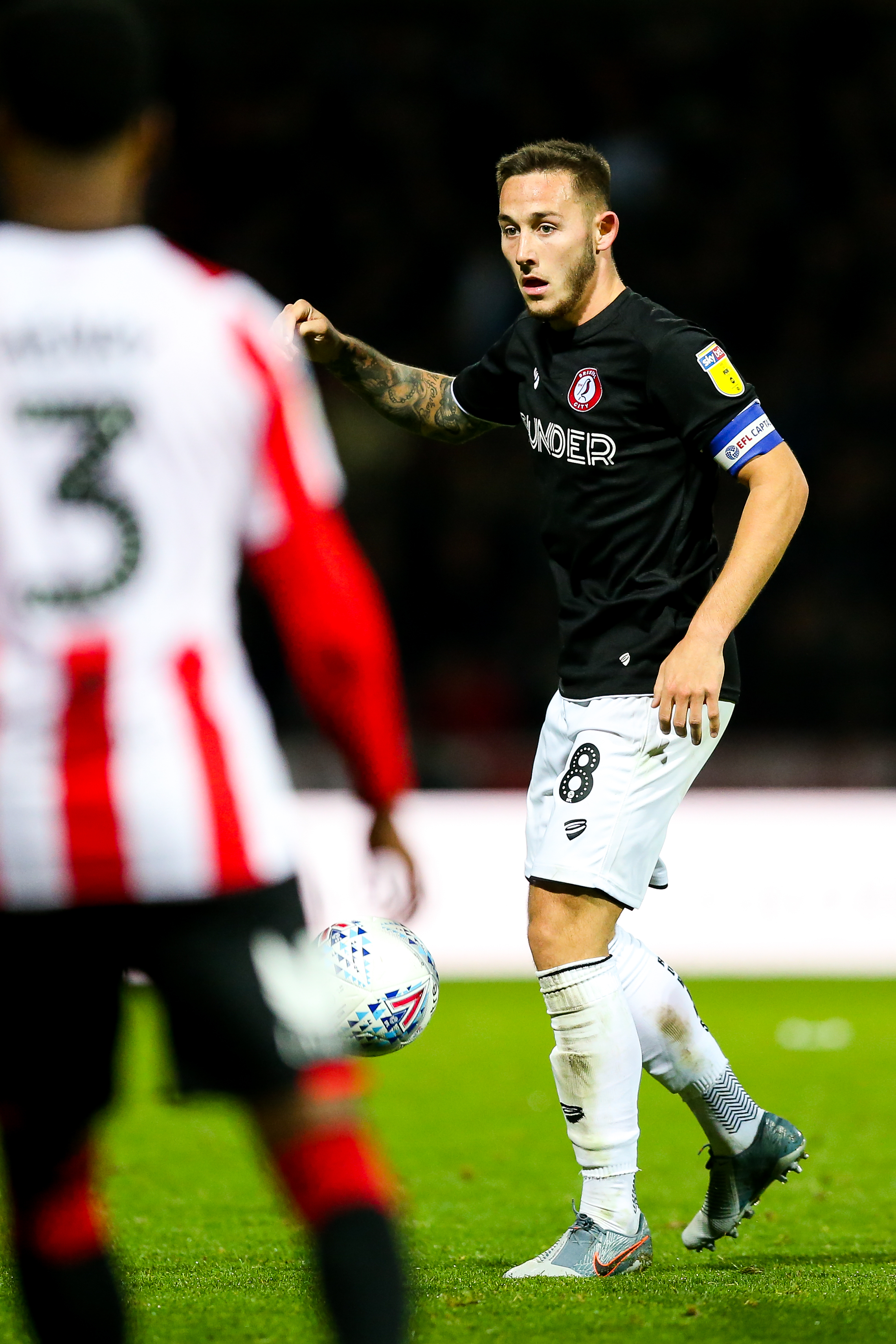
Brownhill playing for Bristol City in 2019.

On 2 June 2016, it was announced that Brownhill would join Bristol City on a two-year deal upon his contract expiry at Preston North End.

On 29 April 2017 Brownhill scored his first goal for Bristol City against Brighton & Hove Albion, beating them 1–0 away from home and securing City's place in the Championship for the 2017–18 season.

On 5 January 2019, Brownhill scored the only goal as Bristol City won 1–0 to upset Premier League side Huddersfield Town in the FA Cup third round.

=== Burnley ===
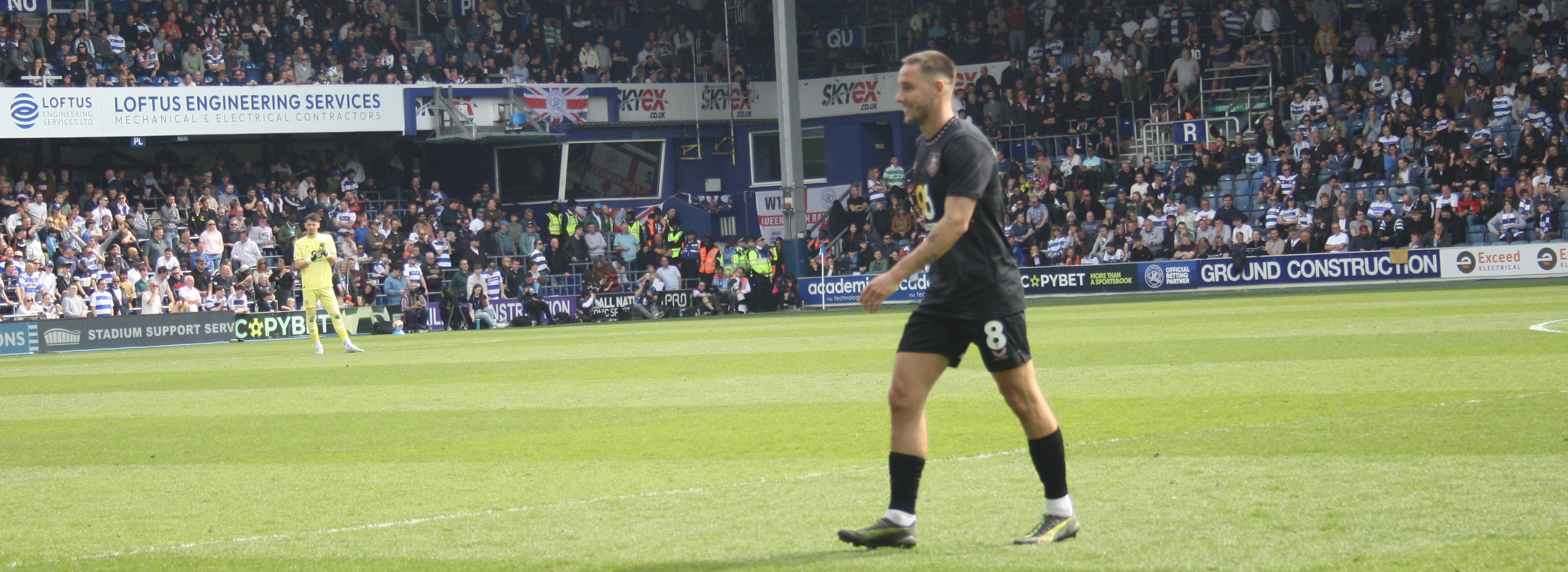
Brownhill playing for Burnley in 2025.

Brownhill signed for Premier League club Burnley on 30 January 2020 for an undisclosed fee. On 22 February 2020, Brownhill made his debut for the club in a 3–0 victory at home to Bournemouth, coming on as a stoppage time substitute for Jack Cork. He scored his first Premier League goal and his first goal for Burnley against Brighton on 19 February 2022. On 21 May 2024, the club said it had activated a contract extension.

Brownhill captained the side for the first time against Watford on 12 August 2022, before being confirmed as club captain in August 2024. On 21 April 2025, he netted a brace in a 2–1 victory over Sheffield United, ensuring his team's promotion to the Premier League. Having finished the season in impressive form, he was named EFL Championship Player of the Month for April 2025.

On 20 May 2025, Burnley announced they were discussing a new contract with the player, but on 28 July 2025, Brownhill announced his departure from the club.

=== Al Shabab ===
On 11 September 2025, Brownhill joined Saudi Pro League side Al Shabab.

== Career statistics ==
As of match played 25 August 2026

Appearances and goals by club, season and competition
Club	Season	League			National Cup		League Cup		Other		Total	
Club	Season	Division	Apps	Goals	Apps	Goals	Apps	Goals	Apps	Goals	Apps	Goals
Preston North End	2013–14	League One	24	3	4	0	0	0	2 (Note: One appearance in Football League Trophy, one in League One play-offs)	0	30	3
Preston North End	2014–15	League One	18	2	4	0	2	0	4 (Note: Appearances in Football League Trophy)	0	28	2
Preston North End	2015–16	Championship	3	0	1	0	2	1	—		6	1
Preston North End	Total		45	5	9	0	4	1	6	0	64	6
Barnsley (loan)	2015–16	League One	22	2	—		—		5 (Note: Two appearances in Football League Trophy, three appearances and one goal in League One play-offs)	1	27	3
Bristol City	2016–17	Championship	27	1	3	0	2	0	—		32	1
Bristol City	2017–18	Championship	45	5	0	0	6	0	—		51	5
Bristol City	2018–19	Championship	45	5	3	1	1	0	—		49	6
Bristol City	2019–20	Championship	28	5	1	0	0	0	—		29	5
Bristol City	Total		145	16	7	1	9	0	—		161	17
Burnley	2019–20	Premier League	10	0	—		—		—		10	0
Burnley	2020–21	Premier League	33	0	0	0	3	1	—		36	1
Burnley	2021–22	Premier League	35	2	1	0	2	0	—		38	2
Burnley	2022–23	Championship	41	7	4	0	3	0	—		48	7
Burnley	2023–24	Premier League	33	4	1	0	1	0	—		35	4
Burnley	2024–25	Championship	42	18	1	0	1	0	—		44	18
Burnley	Total		194	31	7	0	10	1	—		211	32
Al Shabab	2025–26	Saudi Pro League	30	5	3	0	—		6 (Note: Six appearances and three goals in the AGCFF Gulf Club Champions League)	4	39	9
Al Shabab	2026–27	Saudi Pro League	3	1	1	1	—		—		4	2
Al Shabab	Total		33	6	4	1	—		6	4	43	11
Career totals			439	60	27	2	23	2	17	5	506	68

== Honours ==
Barnsley

- Football League One play-offs: 2016
- Football League Trophy: 2015–16

Burnley

- EFL Championship: 2022–23

Individual

- EFL Championship Team of the Season: 2022–23
- PFA Team of the Year: 2022–23 Championship, 2024–25 Championship
- EFL Championship Player of the Month: April 2025
