= 2026–27 Dundee F.C. season =

Dundee
2026–27 season
- Chairman: Tim Keyes
- Head coach: Steven Pressley
- Stadium: Dens Park
- Scottish Premiership: 7th
- League Cup: Second round
- Scottish Cup: Fourth round
- Top goalscorer: League: Bradley Fink & Joe Westley (4); All: Joe Westley (6)
- Highest home attendance: 9,048 vs. Rangers, 17 October 2026 (Prem.)
- Lowest home attendance: 1,807 vs. Airdrie, 11 July 2026 (League Cup GS)
- Average home league attendance: 6,864
| Home colours | Away colours |

The 2026–27 season is the 125th season in which Dundee will compete at a Scottish national level, and the 102nd season played in the highest division in the Scottish football league system. They will play in the Scottish Premiership for the fourth consecutive season after finishing 8th in the previous campaign. Dundee will also compete in the League Cup and the Scottish Cup.

== Season summary ==
=== Pre-season ===
On 3 June 2026, Dundee announced their first friendlies of the new season with away visits to newly-relegated Livingston and Brechin City. On 17 June, Dundee confirmed the club would embark on a pre-season trip to Hungary with a base at the Globall Football Park and Sporthotel in Telki on the outskirts of Budapest, with Hungarian club Paksi FC having previously announced a match with the Dark Blues during their trip. That same day, they also confirmed a friendly against Premier League club Everton which will take place at Dens Park midway through their Scottish League Cup group stage campaign.

=== July ===
Dundee started their competitive season with a League Cup group match at home to Airdrieonians for the second straight year, though despite a sleepy first half they avoided another defeat and finished with the 3 points. Three days later, Dundee enjoyed a five-star 2nd half to dispatch Annan Athletic at Galabank with ease. The next week following a humbling by Premier League side Everton in a friendly, the Dee travelled up to Dingwall to take on a now 3rd tier Ross County but returned with similar results to previous visits to the Highlands, struggling for a draw before losing the bonus point on penalties to make qualification to the next round much more uncertain. After a slow first half, Dundee secured their qualification to the next round as a best runners-up with a four-goal flurry against Clyde at Dens.

=== August ===
Dundee opened their league campaign with a daunting trip to Celtic Park to take on the reigning champions, but managed to keep things close and suffered only a narrow defeat. The following week, the first league game this season at Dens Park went exceedingly well as the Dee dominated Aberdeen and enjoyed a comfortable first win of the season, along with the streak of 3 straight wins over the Dons for the first time in their history. They could not extend this streak further the next week however in a rematch in the Scottish League Cup where a 12-minute flurry at Pittodrie saw Aberdeen progress comfortably in the end. Returning to league action, Dundee enjoyed another visit to Tannadice Park for the Dundee derby, scoring each side of half-time to dispatch Dundee United without reply to go joint-top. The next Sunday was another reality check though, as it was a case of "too little, too late" as a late goal wasn't enough to catch Hibernian in a home game where the hosts were comfortably second best.

=== September ===
In a midweek match against St Johnstone, Dundee thought they had stolen a win after another lacklustre game before conceding a last minute equaliser to end the game in what ended up a frustrating but overall fair draw. The following game away to Hearts proved even more frustrating, as Dundee lost a lead late on and lost to a last-minute strike, as well as suffering multiple injuries to their already depleted squad. A 10 day lay-off provided no help on the injury front with several more knocks received in bounce games, but the injury-laden Dees put on a battling performance in a home win over Motherwell to jump to 4th place in the league ahead of the extended international break.

=== October ===
After three weeks off and even more injury uncertainty following the international break, another barebones Dundee squad put in a gutsy performance at Falkirk Stadium, culminating in a late winner from the returning Ashley Hay to keep them in 4th and keep their impressive start going. The next week saw Dundee welcome a Rangers side on a 7-game win streak, and another strong defensive performance along with consistent pressure proved enough to give the Dark Blues a well-earned point. The unbeaten run came to an end the next week at St Mirren Park, where Dundee were second best in a bad-weathered and bad-tempered game played in the midst of Storm Boelo. However, a midweek return to Dens against Kilmarnock was welcome as a late double from Ashley Hay cemented another home win and moved Dundee up to 4th again above their cross-street rivals.

=== November ===
After a little extra time off over Halloween, Dundee returned to action with a short trip to Perth but failed to keep up with St Johnstone and returned home with a defeat. After a two-week international and looking to get back into form, Steven Pressley's men did the furthest thing from it at home to Hearts, suffering an eight-goal battering which set the mark for the club's worst home result in its history, and the 2nd worst result in Dundee's 133-year history (behind only an 11–0 loss to Celtic in October 1895) and resulted in them dropping to 7th place.

== Competitions ==
Win Draw Loss Postponed

=== Pre-season and friendlies ===
| 27 June 2026 Friendly | Livingston | 2–0 | Dundee | Almondvale Stadium, Livingston |
| 14:00 | Muirhead 67', 81' | Report |

| 30 June 2026 Friendly | Dundee | 1–0 | Dorogi | Globall Football Park, Telki, Hungary |
| 17:00 CEST | Hamilton 81' | Report |

| 2 July 2026 Friendly | Dundee | 2–1 | Paksi | Globall Football Park, Telki, Hungary |
| 14:00 CEST | Hay 45'; Bland 61' | Report | Horváth 67' |

| 4 July 2026 Friendly | Dundee | 1–2 | Maccabi Haifa | Globall Football Park, Telki, Hungary |
| 18:00 CEST | J. Bevan 59' | Report | Mordechai 7'; Azoulay 17' |

| 8 July 2026 Friendly | Brechin City | 1–1 | Dundee | Glebe Park, Brechin |
| 19:45 | Taylor 45' | Report | Hay 13' | Referee: Tayler Martin |

| 18 July 2026 Friendly | Dundee | 0–4 | Everton | Dens Park, Dundee |
| 14:00 | | Report | Beto 37'; Barry 68'; Foster 81'; McNeil 89' | Attendance: 4,392 |

=== Scottish Premiership ===
Dundee will play against Aberdeen, Celtic, Dundee United, Falkirk, Heart of Midlothian, Hibernian, Kilmarnock, Motherwell, Rangers, St Johnstone and St Mirren in the 2026–27 Premiership campaign. They will play each team three times, twice at home and once away against half of the teams, and once at home and twice away against the other half. Following this, they will be split into either a top or bottom group of six depending on their position after 33 games, where they will play each team in their group once.

| 3 August 2026 1 | Celtic | 1–0 | Dundee | Celtic Park, Glasgow |
| 19:30 | Nygren 52' | Report | | Attendance: 58,904; Referee: Matthew MacDermid |

| 8 August 2026 2 | Dundee | 2–0 | Aberdeen | Dens Park, Dundee |
| 15:00 | Westley 9'; J. Bevan 56' | Report | | Attendance: 8,204; Referee: Calum Scott |

| 22 August 2026 3 | Dundee United | 0–2 | Dundee | Tannadice Park, Dundee |
| 17:45 | | Report | D. Wright 43'; O. Bevan 57' | Attendance: 13,337; Referee: David Dickinson |

| 30 August 2026 4 | Dundee | 1–2 | Hibernian | Dens Park, Dundee |
| 15:00 | Westley 83' | Report | Boyle 25'; Wright 61' | Attendance: 6,534; Referee: John Beaton |

| 2 September 2026 5 | Dundee | 1–1 | St Johnstone | Dens Park, Dundee |
| 19:45 | Reilly 87' | Report | Fowler 90' | Attendance: 6,104; Referee: Ross Hardie |

| 6 September 2026 6 | Heart of Midlothian | 2–1 | Dundee | Tynecastle Park, Edinburgh |
| 15:00 | Braga 84' (pen.); Kerjota 90+6' | Report | Fink 17'; Bešir (red card) 90+1' | Referee: Chris Graham |

| 19 September 2026 7 | Dundee | 2–1 | Motherwell | Dens Park, Dundee |
| 15:00 | Westley 23' (pen.); Fink 40' | Report | Lowry 44' | Attendance: 5,318; Referee: Ross Hardie |

| 10 October 2026 8 | Falkirk | 1–2 | Dundee | Falkirk Stadium, Falkirk |
| 15:00 | Murrell 31' (pen.) | Report | O. Bevan 52'; Hay 90+1' | Attendance: 7,101; Referee: David Dickinson |

| 17 October 2026 9 | Dundee | 2–2 | Rangers | Dens Park, Dundee |
| 20:00 | Fink 37'; Jones 69' | Report | Bouanani 42'; Raskin 60' | Attendance: 9,048; Referee: Duncan Nicolson |

| 24 October 2026 10 | St Mirren | 2–1 | Dundee | St Mirren Park, Paisley |
| 15:00 | Ramsay 20'; Sule 56' | Report | Fink 74' | Attendance: 6,532; Referee: Steven McLean |

| 28 October 2026 11 | Dundee | 3–1 | Kilmarnock | Dens Park, Dundee |
| 19:45 | J. Bevan 32'; Hay 83', 90+4' | Report | Hugill 75' (pen.) | Attendance: 4,866; Referee: Duncan Nicolson |

| 7 November 2026 12 | St Johnstone | 2–1 | Dundee | McDiarmid Park, Perth |
| 15:00 | Campbell 5'; Fotheringham 72' | Report | Westley 47' | Attendance: 6,508; Referee: David Dickinson |

| 21 November 2026 13 | Dundee | 0–8 | Heart of Midlothian | Dens Park, Dundee |
| 17:45 | O. Bevan (red card) 56' | Report | Kerjota 23', 81'; Kaboré 25', 32'; Finnigan 40' (o.g.); Braga 72'; Guendouz 79'; Findlay 89' | Attendance: 7,974; Referee: Steven McLean |

| 24 November 2026 14 | Hibernian | v | Dundee | Easter Road, Edinburgh |
| 19:45 |

For upcoming Scottish Premiership fixtures, see the official Dundee F.C. website

==== League table ====
| Pos | Team | Pld | W | D | L | GF | GA | GD | Pts | Qualification or relegation (Note: Teams play each other three times (33 matches), before the league is split into two groups (the top six and the bottom six).) |
|---|---|---|---|---|---|---|---|---|---|---|
| 5 | Dundee United | 13 | 5 | 5 | 3 | 21 | 17 | +4 | 20 | |
| 6 | St Johnstone | 14 | 4 | 5 | 5 | 18 | 22 | −4 | 17 | |
| 7 | Dundee | 13 | 5 | 2 | 6 | 18 | 23 | −5 | 17 | |
| 8 | Aberdeen | 13 | 4 | 2 | 7 | 16 | 20 | −4 | 14 | |
| 9 | St Mirren | 14 | 4 | 2 | 8 | 13 | 26 | −13 | 14 | |

Updated to match(es) played on 21 November 2026. Source:
Rules for classification: 1) Points; 2) Goal difference; 3) Goals scored; 4) Head-to-head points; 5) Head-to-head goal difference; 6) Play-off (only if deciding champion, UEFA competition qualification, second stage group allocation, or relegation).

==== Results by round ====
| Round | 1 | 2 | 3 | 4 | 5 | 6 | 7 | 8 | 9 | 10 | 11 | 12 | 13 | 14 |
|---|---|---|---|---|---|---|---|---|---|---|---|---|---|---|
| Ground | A | H | A | H | H | A | H | A | H | A | H | A | H | A |
| Result | L | W | W | L | D | L | W | W | D | L | W | L | L | |
| Position | 11 | 5 | 2 | 4 | 5 | 6 | 4 | 4 | 4 | 5 | 4 | 5 | 7 | |

Source: Competitive matches
A = Away; H = Home; W = Win; D = Draw; L = Loss

=== Scottish Cup ===
Dundee will compete in the Scottish Cup, entering in the fourth round.

=== Scottish League Cup ===
Dundee competed in the Scottish League Cup, entering in the group stage. The draw for the group stage was held on 27 May 2026 at 13:00, broadcast live on Premier Sports Player and the SPFL YouTube channel. Dundee was drawn into Group D with Airdrieonians, Ross County, Clyde and Annan Athletic.

==== Group stage ====
| 11 July 2026 1 | Dundee | 4–2 | Airdrieonians | Dens Park, Dundee |
| 15:00 | Reilly 31'; Hamilton 55'; J. Bevan 74'; Hay 80' | Report | Sharp 11' (o.g.); Fisher 45+1' | Attendance: 1,807; Referee: Duncan Nicolson |

| 14 July 2026 2 | Annan Athletic | 0–5 | Dundee | Galabank, Annan |
| 19:45 | | Report | Reilly 55', 62'; J. Bevan 68'; Murray 74'; Hay 80' | Attendance: 451; Referee: Colin Steven |

| 21 July 2026 3 | Ross County | 1–1 (7–6 p) | Dundee | Victoria Park, Dingwall |
| 19:45 | Graham 55' | Report | Robertson 20' | Attendance: 1,111; Referee: Sean Murdoch |
| | Penalties |
| | Graham (penalty scored); Phillips (penalty scored); Lindsay (penalty missed); Strapp (penalty scored); Docherty (penalty scored); Cornelius (penalty scored); McCarvel (penalty scored); Wright (penalty scored) | | (penalty scored) Murray; (penalty scored) Hay; (penalty missed) Hamilton; (penalty scored) Westley; (penalty scored) Forrest; (penalty scored) Robertson; (penalty scored) Astley; (penalty missed) Odutayo |

| 25 July 2026 4 | Dundee | 4–0 | Clyde | Dens Park, Dundee |
| 15:00 | Forrest 48'; Murray 70' (pen.); Westley 75', 84' | Report | | Attendance: 1,942; Referee: Matthew MacDermid |

==== Knockout stage ====
Dundee qualified as one of the best runners-up, meaning they would be unseeded for the second round draw. The draw took place following the final group stage match on 26 July.

| 15 August 2026 Second round | Aberdeen | 3–0 | Dundee | Pittodrie Stadium, Aberdeen |
| 15:00 | Nisbet 51', 63'; Ntelo 57' | Report | | Attendance: 10,018; Referee: Nick Walsh |

==== Group D table ====
| Pos | Team | Pld | W | PW | PL | L | GF | GA | GD | Pts | Qualification | ROS | DND | CLY | AIR | ANN |
|---|---|---|---|---|---|---|---|---|---|---|---|---|---|---|---|---|
| 1 | Ross County | 4 | 3 | 1 | 0 | 0 | 11 | 3 | +8 | 11 | Qualification for the second round | — | p1–1 | 3–1 | — | — |
| 2 | Dundee | 4 | 3 | 0 | 1 | 0 | 14 | 3 | +11 | 10 | Qualification for the second round | — | — | 4–0 | 4–2 | — |
| 3 | Clyde | 4 | 2 | 0 | 0 | 2 | 6 | 8 | −2 | 6 | | — | — | — | 1–0 | 4–1 |
| 4 | Airdrieonians | 4 | 1 | 0 | 0 | 3 | 5 | 8 | −3 | 3 | | 0–3 | — | — | — | 3–0 |
| 5 | Annan Athletic | 4 | 0 | 0 | 0 | 4 | 2 | 16 | −14 | 0 | | 1–4 | 0–5 | — | — | — |

Rules for classification: 1) goal difference, 2) goals scored, 3) away goals scored, 4) matches won, 5) away matches won, 6) drawing of lots.

== Squad statistics ==
As of 21 November 2026

| No. | Pos | Nat | Player | Total | | Premiership | | Scottish Cup | | League Cup | |
| No. | Pos | Nat | Player | Apps | Goals | Apps | Goals | Apps | Goals | Apps | Goals |
|---|---|---|---|---|---|---|---|---|---|---|---|
| 1 | GK | (Canada) CAN | Owen Goodman | 14 | 0 | 13 | 0 | 0 | 0 | 1 | 0 |
| 2 | DF | (England) ENG | Brad Halliday | 8 | 0 | 1+5 | 0 | 0 | 0 | 1+1 | 0 |
| 3 | DF | (England) ENG | Idris Odutayo | 12 | 0 | 5+2 | 0 | 0 | 0 | 4+1 | 0 |
| 4 | DF | (Wales) WAL | Ryan Astley | 18 | 0 | 13 | 0 | 0 | 0 | 5 | 0 |
| 5 | DF | (Wales) WAL | Owen Bevan | 15 | 2 | 12 | 2 | 0 | 0 | 3 | 0 |
| 6 | DF | (United States) USA | Matai Akinmboni | 1 | 0 | 0+1 | 0 | 0 | 0 | 0 | 0 |
| 7 | DF | (England) ENG | Drey Wright | 18 | 1 | 12+1 | 1 | 0 | 0 | 5 | 0 |
| 8 | MF | (England) ENG | Ryan Finnigan | 14 | 0 | 7+2 | 0 | 0 | 0 | 5 | 0 |
| 9 | FW | (Scotland) SCO | Bobby Wales | 5 | 0 | 1+4 | 0 | 0 | 0 | 0 | 0 |
| 10 | MF | (Scotland) SCO | Finlay Robertson | 9 | 1 | 1+5 | 0 | 0 | 0 | 1+2 | 1 |
| 11 | FW | (England) ENG | Ashley Hay | 12 | 5 | 5+3 | 3 | 0 | 0 | 2+2 | 2 |
| 12 | DF | (England) ENG | Imari Samuels | 8 | 0 | 8 | 0 | 0 | 0 | 0 | 0 |
| 13 | GK | (Republic of Ireland) IRL | Kieran O'Hara | 3 | 0 | 0 | 0 | 0 | 0 | 3 | 0 |
| 14 | MF | (Scotland) SCO | Alan Forrest | 16 | 1 | 10+3 | 0 | 0 | 0 | 0+3 | 1 |
| 15 | FW | (Scotland) SCO | Simon Murray | 7 | 2 | 2 | 0 | 0 | 0 | 3+2 | 2 |
| 17 | MF | (Slovenia) SLO | Žan Bešir | 8 | 0 | 0+5 | 0 | 0 | 0 | 1+2 | 0 |
| 18 | MF | (Scotland) SCO | Charlie Reilly | 15 | 4 | 5+5 | 1 | 0 | 0 | 5 | 3 |
| 19 | FW | (England) ENG | Joe Westley | 14 | 6 | 8+2 | 4 | 0 | 0 | 1+3 | 2 |
| 21 | FW | (Switzerland) SUI | Bradley Fink | 11 | 4 | 9+2 | 4 | 0 | 0 | 0 | 0 |
| 26 | DF | (Wales) WAL | Joe Wright | 3 | 0 | 1+2 | 0 | 0 | 0 | 0 | 0 |
| 27 | FW | (Scotland) SCO | Joe Bevan | 18 | 4 | 10+3 | 2 | 0 | 0 | 5 | 2 |
| 28 | MF | (England) ENG | Callum Jones | 9 | 1 | 6+1 | 1 | 0 | 0 | 2 | 0 |
| 30 | GK | (Scotland) SCO | Harrison Sharp | 1 | 0 | 0 | 0 | 0 | 0 | 1 | 0 |
| 47 | MF | (Scotland) SCO | Ashton Leiper | 0 | 0 | 0 | 0 | 0 | 0 | 0 | 0 |
| 48 | MF | (Scotland) SCO | Ethan Hamilton | 18 | 1 | 13 | 0 | 0 | 0 | 5 | 1 |
| 52 | DF | (Scotland) SCO | Charley Oosenbrugh | 2 | 0 | 0 | 0 | 0 | 0 | 0+2 | 0 |
| 55 | MF | (Scotland) SCO | Rory Hughes | 0 | 0 | 0 | 0 | 0 | 0 | 0 | 0 |
| 58 | MF | (Scotland) SCO | Ethan Crombie | 1 | 0 | 0 | 0 | 0 | 0 | 0+1 | 0 |
| 60 | MF | (Scotland) SCO | Ryan Bland | 1 | 0 | 0 | 0 | 0 | 0 | 0+1 | 0 |
| 77 | MF | (England) ENG | Alfie Harrison | 2 | 0 | 0+2 | 0 | 0 | 0 | 0 | 0 |
Players away from the club on non co-op loan:
| 6 | DF | (Northern Ireland) NIR | Aaron Donnelly | 3 | 0 | 0 | 0 | 0 | 0 | 2+1 | 0 |
| 45 | DF | (Scotland) SCO | Cole Perrie | 0 | 0 | 0 | 0 | 0 | 0 | 0 | 0 |
Players who left the club during the season:
| 16 | MF | (Republic of Ireland) IRL | Jack Moorhouse | 2 | 0 | 1+1 | 0 | 0 | 0 | 0 | 0 |

== Transfers ==
=== Summer ===
==== Players in ====
| Date | Player | From | Fee |
|---|---|---|---|
| 26 June 2026 | (England) Idris Odutayo | (England) Bromley | Free |
| 27 June 2026 | (England) Ryan Finnigan | (England) Blackpool | Undisclosed |
| 7 July 2026 | (Slovenia) Žan Bešir | (Slovenia) Primorje | Free |
| 10 July 2026 | (Wales) Owen Bevan | (England) Bournemouth | Free |
| 13 July 2026 | (Scotland) Alan Forrest | (Scotland) Heart of Midlothian | Free |
| 25 July 2026 | (Canada) Owen Goodman | (England) Crystal Palace | Loan |
| 20 August 2026 | (Scotland) Bobby Wales | (Wales) Swansea City | Loan |
| 22 August 2026 | (Switzerland) Bradley Fink | (England) Wycombe Wanderers | Loan |
| 27 August 2026 | (United States) Matai Akinmboni | (England) Bournemouth | Loan |
| 31 August 2026 | (Wales) Joe Wright | (England) Bradford City | Undisclosed |
| 2 September 2026 | (Republic of Ireland) Jack Moorhouse | (England) Manchester United | Loan |

==== Players out ====
| Date | Player | To | Fee |
|---|---|---|---|
| 1 July 2026 | (France) Billy Koumetio | (England) Charlton Athletic | £500,000 |
| 2 July 2026 | (Scotland) Luke Graham | (England) Stoke City | £2,000,000 |
| 7 July 2026 | (England) Paul Digby | (England) Colchester United | Mutual consent |
| 8 July 2026 | (England) Emile Acquah | (England) Notts County | Undisclosed |
| 30 July 2026 | (Northern Ireland) Aaron Donnelly | (Scotland) Dunfermline Athletic | Loan |
| 29 August 2026 | (Scotland) Charley Oosenbrugh | (Scotland) Montrose | Co-operation loan |

=== Winter ===
==== Players in ====
| Date | Player | From | Fee |
|---|---|---|---|
| 7 October 2026 | (England) Alfie Harrison | (England) Newcastle United | Free |

==== Players out ====
| Date | Player | To | Fee |
|---|---|---|---|
| 29 September 2026 | (Republic of Ireland) Jack Moorhouse | (England) Manchester United | Return from loan |
| 17 November 2026 | (Scotland) Cole Perrie | (Scotland) Cowdenbeath | Loan |

== See also ==
- List of Dundee F.C. seasons
