= Scotland national under-17 football team =

Sports team

Scotland Under-17
- Association: Scottish Football Association
- Head coach: Brian McLaughlin
First colours	Second colours

U-17 World Cup
- Appearances: 1 (first in 1989)
- Best result: Runners-up (1989)

European U-17 Championship
- Appearances: 5 (first in 2008)
- Best result: Semi-final (2014)

The Scotland national under-17 football team, controlled by the Scottish Football Association, is Scotland's national Under-17 football team and is considered to be a feeder team for the Scotland national football team. The team represents Scotland in international Under-17 competitions such as the U-17 World Cup and the European U-17 Championship.

The team has qualified for seven European Championship final tournaments, in 2008, 2014, 2015, 2016, 2017, 2022 and 2023. The team achieved its best result in 2014 by progressing to the semi-final.

== Coaches ==
- Dean Gorre (2012)
- Scot Gemmill (2014)
- Steven Pressley (2015)
- Brian McLaughlin (2017)

== Competitive record ==
Champions Runners-up Third place / semi finals Fourth place Tournament held on home soil

=== FIFA U-17 World Cup Record ===
Year	Result	GP	W	D*	L	GF	GA	GD
Before 1991	See Scotland national under-16 football team							
(Italy) 1991	did not qualify							
(Japan) 1993	did not qualify							
(Ecuador) 1995	did not qualify							
(Egypt) 1997	did not qualify							
(New Zealand) 1999	did not qualify							
(Trinidad and Tobago) 2001	did not qualify							
(Finland) 2003	did not qualify							
(Peru) 2005	did not qualify							
(South Korea) 2007	did not qualify							
(Nigeria) 2009	did not qualify							
(Mexico) 2011	did not qualify							
(United Arab Emirates) 2013	did not qualify							
(Chile) 2015	did not qualify							
(India) 2017	did not qualify							
(Brazil) 2019	did not qualify							
(Peru) 2021	Cancelled due to COVID-19 pandemic in Peru							
(Indonesia) 2023	did not qualify							
(Qatar) 2025	did not qualify							
(Qatar) 2026	did not qualify							
(Qatar) 2027	did not qualify							
(Qatar) 2028	To be determined							
(Qatar) 2029	To be determined							

*Draws include knockout matches decided on penalty kicks.

=== UEFA European U-17 Championship Record ===
Year	Result	GP	W	D*	L	GF	GA	GD
Before 2002	See Scotland national under-16 football team							
(Denmark) 2002	Did not qualify							
(Portugal) 2003	Did not qualify							
(France) 2004	Did not qualify							
(Italy) 2005	Did not qualify							
(Luxembourg) 2006	Qualifying round	Did not qualify						
(Belgium) 2007	Elite round	Did not qualify						
(Turkey) 2008	Group stage	3	0	0	3	0	5	−5
(Germany) 2009	Elite round	Did not qualify						
(Liechtenstein) 2010	Qualifying round	Did not qualify						
(Serbia) 2011	Elite round	Did not qualify						
(Slovenia) 2012	Elite round	Did not qualify						
(Slovakia) 2013	Qualifying round	Did not qualify						
(Malta) 2014	Semi-finals	4	2	0	2	4	8	−4
(Bulgaria) 2015	Group stage	3	0	0	3	0	8	−8
(Azerbaijan) 2016	Group stage	3	0	0	3	0	5	−5
(Croatia) 2017	Group stage	3	1	1	1	4	3	+1
(England) 2018	Elite round	Did not qualify						
(Republic of Ireland) 2019	Elite round	Did not qualify						
(Estonia) 2020	Cancelled due to COVID-19 pandemic							
(Cyprus) 2021	Cancelled due to COVID-19 pandemic							
(Israel) 2022	Group stage	3	0	0	3	2	9	−7
(Hungary) 2023	Group stage	3	0	0	3	2	8	−6
(Cyprus) 2024	Qualifying round	Did not qualify						
(Albania) 2025	Elite Round	Did not qualify						
(Estonia) 2026	Elite Round	Did not qualify						
(Latvia) 2027	Qualifying round	Did not qualify						
(Lithuania) 2028	To be determined							
(Moldova) 2029	To be determined							
Total	7/21	22	3	1	18	12	46	−34

*Draws include knockout matches decided on penalty kicks.

=== Other tournaments ===
Year	Competition	Result	GP	W	D*	L	GS	GA	Ref
(France) 1985	Saint-Malo Tournament	2nd	4	1	2	1	2	2	
(France) 1986	Saint-Malo Tournament	2nd	4	3	0	1	6	4	
(France) 1987	Saint-Malo Tournament	6th	4	1	2	1	2	2	
(France) 1988	Saint-Malo Tournament	5th	Full results unknown						
(France) 1989	Eurofoot Tournament	4th	Full results unknown						
(France) 1990	Eurofoot Tournament	5th	Full results unknown						
(France) 1992	Eurofoot Tournament	3rd	Full results unknown						
(Portugal) 1999	Lisbon International	4th	3	0	0	3	2	16	
(Austria) 2007	Toto Cup	3rd	3	1	0	2	4	6	
(Austria) 2011	Toto Cup	4th	3	0	1	2	3	7	
(Hungary) 2016	Telki Cup	3rd	3	2	0	1	4	6	
(England) 2017	Pepsi Tournament	3rd	3	1	0	2	4	4	

== Current squad ==
The following players have been selected for some matches during 2026 UEFA European Under-17 Championship qualification.

No.	Pos.	Player	Date of birth (age)	Club
1	GK	Joe Hastings	20 September 2009 (age 17)	(Scottish Football Association) Falkirk
12	GK	Warren Lyall	12 October 2009 (age 17)	(Scottish Football Association) Dundee
22	DF	Arran McSporran	4 March 2009 (age 17)	(Scottish Football Association) Hibernian
	DF	Liam Dolan	27 April 2009 (age 17)	(Scottish Football Association) Partick Thistle
	DF	Charley Oosenbrugh	23 June 2009 (age 17)	(Scottish Football Association) Dundee
4	DF	Nairn Reynolds	14 June 2009 (age 17)	(Scottish Football Association) Dundee United
	DF	Joseph Haney	25 June 2009 (age 17)	(Scottish Football Association) Celtic
18	DF	Oliver Goodbrand	9 February 2009 (age 17)	(The Football Association) Newcastle United
5	DF	Marcus Buchanan	25 February 2009 (age 17)	(Scottish Football Association) Dundee United
6	DF	Callan Hamill (captain)	1 March 2009 (age 17)	(The Football Association) Arsenal
	MF	Nathan Meechan	1 February 2009 (age 17)	(Scottish Football Association) Celtic
2	MF	Ben Hutton	19 August 2009 (age 17)	(Scottish Football Association) Rangers
10	MF	Aiden Crilly	2 January 2009 (age 17)	(Scottish Football Association) Rangers
13	MF	Aaron Thomson	26 March 2009 (age 17)	(Scottish Football Association) Motherwell
15	MF	Ben Stoddart	17 December 2009 (age 16)	(Scottish Football Association) St Mirren
23	MF	Keir McMeekin	17 February 2010 (age 16)	(Scottish Football Association) Heart of Midlothian
	MF	Harlem McLaughlin	30 October 2009 (age 17)	(The Football Association) Manchester United
8	MF	Stanley Wilson	14 March 2009 (age 17)	(Scottish Football Association) Heart of Midlothian
14	MF	Ethan Crombie	21 January 2009 (age 17)	(Scottish Football Association) Dundee
16	MF	Jamie Forrest	4 January 2009 (age 17)	(Scottish Football Association) Dundee United
3	MF	Liam Walker	12 May 2009 (age 17)	(Scottish Football Association) Heart of Midlothian
	MF	Kyle Glasgow	20 February 2010 (age 16)	(Scottish Football Association) Rangers
	MF	Jack Lavery	8 January 2009 (age 17)	(Scottish Football Association) Cumnock Juniors
17	FW	Max Cameron	21 January 2009 (age 17)	(Scottish Football Association) Rangers
7	FW	Callum MacDonald	21 June 2009 (age 17)	(Scottish Football Association) Hibernian
11	FW	Cai McGunnigle	30 March 2009 (age 17)	(Football Association of Hong Kong, China) HKFC
20	FW	Lucas Fyfe	6 March 2009 (age 17)	(Scottish Football Association) Bo'ness United
	FW	Chris Condy	26 December 2009 (age 16)	(Scottish Football Association) Rangers
9	FW	Caelan Cadamarteri	3 November 2009 (age 17)	(The Football Association) Manchester City
	FW	Camron Mpofu	10 September 2009 (age 17)	(The Football Association) Manchester United
19	FW	Luke Douglas	16 July 2009 (age 17)	(Scottish Football Association) St Mirren

== See also ==
- Scotland national football team
- Scotland national under-21 football team
