= Basilio Rieno =

Equatoguinean footballer (born 2004)

Personal information
- Full name: Basilio Rieno Socoliche
- Date of birth: 16 November 2004 (age 22)
- Place of birth: Fuenlabrada, Spain
- Position: Midfielder

Team information
- Current team: Langreo
- Number: 17

Youth career
- 2022–2023: Crystal Palace
- 2023–2025: Burnley

Senior career*
Years	Team	Apps	(Gls)
2025–	Langreo	19	(1)

International career^{‡}
2024–	Equatorial Guinea	2	(0)
- * Club domestic league appearances and goals as of 14 May 2026 ‡ National team caps and goals as of 25 March 2024

Basilio Rieno Socoliche (born 16 November 2004) is a professional footballer who plays as a midfielder for Segunda Federación club Langreo. Born in Spain, he plays for the Equatorial Guinea national team.

== Club career ==
Basilio formerly played for the Crystal Palace academy, before signing with Burnley on a two-year deal for the 2023–24 season. He immediately made an impact, scoring a winner for Burnley U21 in preaseason. Rieno helped the Burnley U21 draw 3–3 with Brentford. He scored in the 4–3 win against Leicester City.

On 13 August 2025, Rieno signed for Langreo.

== International career ==
In 2023, Rieno was called up to play for the Equatorial Guinea national team, and was a substitute in the 1–0 win over Tunisia. He was included in the Equatorial Guinea preliminary squad for the 2023 Africa Cup of Nations, though he didn't make the final squad. On 22 March 2024, Rieno made his debut, coming as a 71st-minute substitute in a 2–0 win over Cambodia during the 2024 FIFA Series.
