= Ameen Al-Dakhil =

Footballer (born 2002)

Personal information
- Full name: Ameen Al-Dakhil
- Date of birth: 6 March 2002 (age 24)
- Place of birth: Baghdad, Iraq
- Height: 1.87 m (6 ft 2 in)
- Position: Centre-back

Team information
- Current team: VfB Stuttgart
- Number: 2

Youth career
- 2009–2011: Kortenaken
- 2011–2012: Hoegaarden-Outgaarden
- 2012–2013: Tienen
- 2013–2017: Anderlecht
- 2017–2021: Standard Liège

Senior career*
Years	Team	Apps	(Gls)
2021–2022	Standard Liège	13	(0)
2022–2023	Sint-Truiden	25	(0)
2023–2024	Burnley	21	(1)
2024–	VfB Stuttgart	16	(0)
2024–2025	VfB Stuttgart II	3	(0)

International career^{‡}
2018–2019	Belgium U17	7	(1)
2019	Belgium U18	1	(0)
2022	Belgium U20	1	(0)
2022–2023	Belgium U21	4	(0)
2023–2024	Belgium	6	(0)
- * Club domestic league appearances and goals as of 17:32, 31 October 2026 (UTC) ‡ National team caps and goals as of 23:16, 17 November 2024 (UTC)

Ameen Al-Dakhil (Arabic: أَمِين الدَّخِيل; born 6 March 2002) is a professional footballer who plays as a centre-back for Bundesliga club VfB Stuttgart. Born in Iraq, he played for the Belgium national team.

== Early life ==
Al-Dakhil was born in Iraq, and moved to Belgium with his family at the age of 5, as a refugee during the Iraq War. He began playing football with the youth academies of Kortenaken, Hoegaarden-Outgaarden, Tienen, Anderlecht and Standard Liège. Originally a striker, Al-Dakhil was then converted to a centre-back.

== Club career ==
=== Standard Liege ===
Al-Dakhil made his professional debut for Standard Liège on 23 July 2021, in a 1–1 Belgian First Division A tie with Genk.

=== Sint–Truiden ===
On 31 January 2022, Al-Dakhil moved to fellow Belgian side Sint-Truiden on a permanent deal.

=== Burnley ===
On 13 January 2023, Al-Dakhil joined English side Burnley for an undisclosed fee, signing a three-and-a-half-year contract with the club. On 31 January 2024, he scored his first goal for Burnley against Manchester City in a 3–1 defeat, becoming the first player born in Iraq to score in the Premier League.

=== VfB Stuttgart ===
On 27 August 2024, Al-Dakhil signed for Bundesliga club VfB Stuttgart on a four-year deal.

== International career ==
Born in Iraq, Al-Dakhil was raised in Belgium and France and holds both Belgian and French citizenship. He has been a youth international for Belgium, having represented the under-17, under-18 and under-21 national teams.

In October 2020, he was called up to represent the Iraqi squad at the AFC U-19 Championship, but the tournament was eventually cancelled due to the COVID-19 pandemic.

In June 2023, he was called up to the senior Belgium squad for the UEFA Euro 2024 qualifying matches against Austria and Estonia on 17 and 20 June 2023 respectively.

== Career statistics ==
=== Club ===
As of match played 31 October 2026

Appearances and goals by club, season and competition
Club	Season	League			National cup (Note: Includes Belgian Cup, FA Cup, DFB-Pokal)		League cup (Note: Includes EFL Cup)		Europe		Total	
Club	Season	Division	Apps	Goals	Apps	Goals	Apps	Goals	Apps	Goals	Apps	Goals
Standard Liège	2021–22	Belgian Pro League	13	0	1	0	—		—		14	0
Sint-Truidense	2021–22	Belgian Pro League	9	0	—		—		—		9	0
Sint-Truidense	2022–23	Belgian Pro League	16	0	3	0	—		—		19	0
Sint-Truidense	Total		25	0	3	0	—		—		28	0
Burnley	2022–23	Championship	8	0	4	0	—		—		12	0
Burnley	2023–24	Premier League	13	1	1	0	3	0	—		17	1
Burnley	Total		21	1	5	0	3	0	—		29	1
VfB Stuttgart	2024–25	Bundesliga	7	0	1	0	—		3 (Note: Appearances in UEFA Champions League)	0	11	0
VfB Stuttgart	2025–26	Bundesliga	8	0	0	0	—		0	0	8	0
VfB Stuttgart	2026–27	Bundesliga	1	0	1	0	—		1	0	3	0
VfB Stuttgart	Total		16	0	2	0	—		4	0	22	0
VfB Stuttgart II	2024–25	3. Liga	2	0	—		—		—		2	0
VfB Stuttgart II	2025–26	3. Liga	1	0	—		—		—		1	0
VfB Stuttgart II	Total		3	0	—		—		—		3	0
Career total			78	1	11	0	3	0	4	0	96	1

=== International ===
As of match played 17 November 2024

Appearances and goals by national team and year
National team	Year	Apps	Goals
Belgium	2023	4	0
Belgium	2024	2	0
Total		6	0
