= 2026–27 Burnley F.C. season =

English football club season

Burnley
2026–27 season
- Owner: ALK Capital LLC
- Chairman: Alan Pace
- Head coach: Nicky Hayen (until 24 October); Fabio Celestini (from 28 October)
- Stadium: Turf Moor
| Home colours | Away colours | Third colours |

The 2026–27 season is the 145th season in the history of Burnley Football Club, and the club's first season back in the Championship since the 2024–25 campaign, following relegation from the Premier League in the preceding season. In addition to the domestic league, the club also participate in the FA Cup and the EFL Cup.

Prior to the beginning of pre-season, on 10 July 2026, Nicky Hayen was appointed as manager on a 3-year contract. Hayen was sacked on 24 October following a 4–1 defeat away to Lincoln City and having won just 1 of his 14 matches in charge.

== Managerial changes ==
On 24 October, Nicky Hayen was dismissed as head coach following the 4–1 defeat at Lincoln City, leaving the club in 22nd place. Four days later, Fabio Celestini was appointed as the new head coach, most recently in charge at CSKA Moscow.

== Contracts and transfers ==
=== New contracts ===
| Date | Pos. | Player | Contracted until | Ref. |
First team
| 10 June 2026 | CM | (England) Josh Laurent | 30 June 2027 | |
| 30 July 2026 | CF | (England) Ashley Barnes | 30 June 2027 | |
Academy
| 10 June 2026 | RB | (England) Hamzat Balogun | 30 June 2027 | |
| 10 June 2026 | CM | (Scotland) Ellis Clark | 30 June 2027 | |
| 10 June 2026 | GK | (England) Lewis Forshaw | 30 June 2027 | |
| 10 June 2026 | RW | (England) Zach Johnson | 30 June 2027 | |
| 10 June 2026 | CF | (England) Vernon Masara | 30 June 2027 | |
| 10 July 2026 | RW | (Republic of Ireland) Kian McMahon-Brown | 30 June 2028 (Note: First professional contract) | |
| 17 July 2026 | CB | (England) Corey King | 30 June 2027 (Note: Club option of a further year) | |
| 18 July 2026 | RB | (England) Michael Stanley | 30 June 2027 | |
| 28 July 2026 | CF | (England) Braidin Derbyshire | 30 June 2027 | |
| 5 August 2026 | CDM | (Northern Ireland) Troy Savage | 30 June 2027 | |
| 27 August 2026 | CM | (England) Joe Bauress | 30 June 2027 | |

=== Released ===
| Date | Pos. | Player | Subsequent club | Joined date | Ref. |
First team
| 30 June 2026 | GK | (Slovakia) Martin Dúbravka | (England) Tottenham Hotspur | 1 July 2026 | |
| 30 June 2026 | GK | (Czech Republic) Václav Hladký | Retired | | |
Academy
| 30 June 2026 | LW | (Wales) Tom Tweedy | (England) Truro City | 1 July 2026 | |
| 30 June 2026 | LB | (England) Joe Ashton | (Republic of Ireland) Waterford | 27 July 2026 | |
| 30 June 2026 | CB | (England) Jack McEvilly | (England) Tranmere Rovers | 27 July 2026 | |
| 30 June 2026 | CM | (England) Charlie Veevers | (England) Tranmere Rovers | 27 July 2026 | |
| 30 June 2026 | LB | (England) Logan Pye | (England) Darlington | 29 August 2026 | |
| 30 June 2026 | CDM | (New Zealand) Marley Leuluai | (New Zealand) Auckland FC | 16 September 2026 | |
| 30 June 2026 | CB | (England) Roman Egan-Riley | (England) Leeds United | 19 September 2026 | |
| 30 June 2026 | CAM | (England) Tommy McDermott | (England) FC Halifax Town | 26 September 2026 | |
| 30 June 2026 | GK | (England) Charlie Casper | | | |

=== Transfers in ===
| Date | Pos. | Player | Transferred from | Transfer fee | Ref. |
First team
| 15 June 2026 (Note: The transfer was announced on 12 June, and would become official on June 15 once the transfer window opened.) | CDM | (Portugal) Florentino | (Portugal) Benfica | £20,800,000 | |
| 12 July 2026 | LW | (Spain) Lluc Castell | (Spain) Espanyol | Undisclosed | |
| 28 July 2026 | CDM | (France) Ugo Raghouber | (France) Lille | £4,275,000 | |
| 5 August 2026 | GK | (England) Ben Amos | (England) Port Vale | Free | |
| 19 August 2026 | GK | (France) Grégoire Coudert | (France) Brest | Undisclosed | |
| 20 August 2026 | CB | (Bosnia and Herzegovina) Anel Ahmedhodžić | (Netherlands) Feyenoord | £6,000,000 | |
| 1 September 2026 | CB | (Brazil) Igor Julio | (England) Brighton & Hove Albion | Undisclosed | |
| 1 September 2026 | CM | (Japan) Reo Hatate | (Scotland) Celtic | Undisclosed | |
| 6 September 2026 | CF | (England) Jamie Vardy | (Italy) Cremonese | Free | |
Academy
| 1 July 2026 (Note: The transfer was announced on 5 June, and would become official on July 1 once Zhang's contract at Voždovac had expired.) | CF | (China) Zhang Jiaming | (Serbia) Voždovac | Free | |
| 24 July 2026 | GK | (England) Jack Robinson | (England) Bradford City | Free | |
| 29 July 2026 | CF | (Bermuda) Blayz Borgesson | (England) Radcliffe | Free | |
| 20 August 2026 | CDM | (Angola) Delfim Luwawu | Academia de Futebol de Angola | Undisclosed | |
| 21 August 2026 | CB | (England) Emmanuel Airoboma | (England) Liverpool | Free | |

=== Transfers out ===
| Date | Pos. | Player | Transferred to | Transfer fee | Ref. |
First team
| 15 June 2026 (Note: The transfer was announced on 28 May, and would become official on June 15 once the transfer window opened.) | LB | (England) Owen Dodgson | (England) Stockport County | Undisclosed | |
| 7 July 2026 | LW | (England) Jaidon Anthony | (England) Brentford | £15,000,000 (Note: A potential further £2,000,000 with performance-related add-ons.) | |
| 11 July 2026 | RW | (France) Loum Tchaouna | (England) Coventry City | £20,000,000 | |
| 17 July 2026 | CB | (France) Maxime Estève | (Germany) RB Leipzig | £22,000,000 (Note: A potential further £6,000,000 in add-ons.) | (Note: Attributed to multiple references:) |
| 29 July 2026 | RW | (Italy) Luca Koleosho | (France) Paris | £12,700,000 | |
| 4 August 2026 | CDM | (Portugal) Florentino | (England) Ipswich Town | £16,000,000 (Note: A potential further £3,000,000 in performance-related add-ons) | |
| 1 September 2026 | CB | (England) Joe Worrall | (Wales) Wrexham | £2,000,000 | |
| 1 September 2026 | CF | (Netherlands) Zian Flemming | (England) Ipswich Town | £20,000,000 | |
| 1 September 2026 | CB | (Democratic Republic of the Congo) Axel Tuanzebe | (France) Auxerre | Free | |
Academy
| 13 August 2026 | CF | (Zimbabwe) Vernon Masara | (England) Peterborough United | Undisclosed | |
| 18 August 2026 | CF | (Scotland) Michael Mellon | (England) Stevenage | Undisclosed | |

=== Loans in ===
| Date | Pos. | Player | Loaned from | On loan until | Ref. |
First team
| 14 August 2026 | CB | (England) Max Alleyne | (England) Manchester City | End of Season | |
| 14 August 2026 | ST | (Kazakhstan) Dastan Satpayev | (England) Chelsea | End of Season | |
| 1 September 2026 | LW | (Belgium) Largie Ramazani | (England) Leeds United | End of Season (Note: Obiligation to make the move permanent) | |
Academy

=== Loans out ===
| Date | Pos. | Player | Loaned to | On loan until | Ref. |
First team
| 7 July 2026 | LB | (Netherlands) Quilindschy Hartman | (Spain) Espanyol | End of Season | |
| 15 July 2026 | CDM | (France) Lesley Ugochukwu | (Turkey) Galatasaray | End of Season (Note: £3,000,000 loan fee) | |
| 24 July 2026 | CAM | (Austria) Oluwaseun Adewumi | (Germany) Hertha BSC | End of Season | |
| 3 September 2026 | CF | (South Africa) Lyle Foster | (United States) Houston Dynamo | End of Season | |
Academy
| 21 August 2026 | LB | (Scotland) Oliver Pimlott | (England) Harrogate Town | 19 September 2026 | |
| 25 August 2026 | GK | (England) Harry Grimshaw | (England) Padiham | 22 September 2026 | |
| 31 August 2026 | RW | (Republic of Ireland) Kian McMahon-Brown | (England) Shrewsbury Town | End of Season | |
| 19 September 2026 | GK | (England) Callum Feeney | (England) Radcliffe | 17 October 2026 | |

== Pre-season and friendlies ==
On 3 June, Burnley announced a tour to the United States with friendlies against Major League Soccer sides Cincinnati, Columbus Crew and Real Salt Lake along with a home fixture against La Liga side Espanyol. On 23 June, a trip to Amsterdam to face AFC Ajax was confirmed. On 10 July, a second home pre-season friendly was added against Torino.

Win Draw Loss Fixtures

| 10 July 2026 Friendly | Cincinnati | 3–1 | Burnley | Cincinnati, United States |
| 19:30 EDT | Denkey 15'; Jabbari 74'; Fletcher 90+4' | Report | Laurent 30' | Stadium: TQL Stadium; Referee: Chris Penson |

| 12 July 2026 Friendly | Columbus Crew | 1–1 | Burnley | Columbus, United States |
| 16:00 EDT | Gazdag 48' | Report | Adewumi 88' | Stadium: ScottsMiracle-Gro Field |

| 15 July 2026 Friendly | Real Salt Lake | 4–1 | Burnley | Sandy, United States |
| 20:00 EDT | Solans 45+1', 73'; Gozo 61'; Luna 82' (pen.) | Report | Broja (penalty missed) 5'; Florentino 55' | Stadium: America First Field |

| 26 July 2026 Friendly | Ajax | 2–1 | Burnley | Amsterdam, Netherlands |
| 14:00 CEST | Bouwman 34'; Ouazane 67' | | Banel 62' | Stadium: Johan Cruyff Arena |

| 29 July 2026 Friendly | Burnley | 2–2 | Espanyol | Burnley |
| 19:45 BST | Ramsey 5'; Hountondji 47'; Laurent (yellow card) 63' | Report | Carreras 4'; García 85' | Stadium: Turf Moor |

| 2 August 2026 Friendly | Burnley | 0–1 | Torino | Burnley |
| 15:00 BST | | Report | Dembele 18' | Stadium: Turf Moor; Attendance: 1,720 |

== Competitions ==
=== Championship ===
==== League table ====
| Pos | Team | Pld | W | D | L | GF | GA | GD | Pts | Promotion, qualification or relegation |
|---|---|---|---|---|---|---|---|---|---|---|
| 20 | Lincoln City | 16 | 4 | 3 | 9 | 15 | 27 | −12 | 15 | |
| 21 | Watford | 16 | 4 | 3 | 9 | 13 | 27 | −14 | 15 | |
| 22 | Burnley | 15 | 1 | 7 | 7 | 22 | 31 | −9 | 10 | Relegation to EFL League One |
| 23 | Derby County | 16 | 2 | 4 | 10 | 14 | 32 | −18 | 10 | Relegation to EFL League One |
| 24 | Preston North End | 16 | 2 | 3 | 11 | 14 | 31 | −17 | 9 | Relegation to EFL League One |

Updated to match(es) played on 21 November 2026. Source: EFL Official Website
Rules for classification: 1) Points; 2) Goal difference; 3) Number of goals scored; 4) Head-to-head results; 5) Wins; 6) Away goals; 7) Penalty points (sec 9.5); 8) Number of 12-point sending off offences; 9) Play-off (only if needed to determine promotion/relegation)

==== Results summary ====
| Overall | | | | | | | | Home | | | | | | Away | | | | | |
| Pld | W | D | L | GF | GA | GD | Pts | W | D | L | GF | GA | GD | W | D | L | GF | GA | GD |
|---|---|---|---|---|---|---|---|---|---|---|---|---|---|---|---|---|---|---|---|
| 15 | 1 | 7 | 7 | 22 | 31 | −9 | 10 | 0 | 5 | 2 | 8 | 10 | −2 | 1 | 2 | 5 | 14 | 21 | −7 |

Source: Soccerway

==== Results by round ====
| Round | 1 | 2 | 3 | 4 | 5 | 6 | 7 | 8 | 9 | 10 | 11 | 12 | 13 | 14 | 15 | 16 | 17 | 18 | 19 | 20 | 21 | 22 | 23 | 24 | 25 |
|---|---|---|---|---|---|---|---|---|---|---|---|---|---|---|---|---|---|---|---|---|---|---|---|---|---|
| Ground | H | A | A | H | H | A | A | H | A | H | A | A | H | A | A | H | H | A | H | A | A | H | A | H | H |
| Result | D | L | L | D | L | D | L | D | W | D | L | L | D | D | L | | | | | | | | | | |
| Position | 11 | 18 | 22 | 23 | 24 | 23 | 24 | 24 | 22 | 21 | 22 | 22 | 22 | 22 | 22 | | | | | | | | | | |
| Points | 1 | 1 | 1 | 2 | 2 | 3 | 3 | 4 | 7 | 8 | 8 | 8 | 9 | 10 | 10 | | | | | | | | | | |

Source: Soccerway
A = Away; H = Home; W = Win; D = Draw; L = Loss; P = Postponed

==== Matches ====
On 25 June, the Championship fixtures were revealed.

Win Draw Loss Fixtures

| 16 August 2026 1 | Burnley | 2–2 | West Ham United | Burnley |
| 16:00 BST | Flemming 83' (pen.), 90+2', (yellow card) 84' | Report | Kilman 10'; Kanté (yellow card) 33'; Castellanos (yellow card) 67'; Solomon 72'; Hermansen (yellow card) 84'; Diouf (yellow card) 90+5' | Stadium: Turf Moor; Attendance: 20,229 (2,000 away); Referee: Josh Smith |

| 23 August 2026 2 | West Bromwich Albion | 3–1 | Burnley | West Bromwich |
| 12:00 BST | Whitwell 18'; Campbell (yellow card) 33'; Price 46', 65' (pen.) | Report | Styles 8' (o.g.); Sonne (yellow card) 26'; Edwards (yellow card) 70' | Stadium: The Hawthorns; Attendance: 24,720 (1,844 away); Referee: Anthony Backhouse |
Note: Fixture was initially scheduled for 22 August, but was rescheduled for live Sky Sports.

| 29 August 2026 3 | Norwich City | 4–1 | Burnley | Norwich |
| 15:00 BST | Touré 2', 21'; Brooks 5', 67', (yellow card) 63'; McConville (yellow card) 16'; Córdoba (yellow card) 29'; Ben Slimane (yellow card) 65' | Report | Laurent 27', (yellow card) 28' (yellow-red card) 77'; Flemming (yellow card) 71' | Stadium: Carrow Road; Attendance: 25,498 (652 away); Referee: Elliot Bell |

| 2 September 2026 4 | Burnley | 1–1 | Middlesbrough | Burnley |
| 20:00 BST | Mejbri (yellow card) 28'; Raghouber 54', (yellow card) 90+1' | Report | Morris 23'; Lankshear (yellow card) 39'; Jones (yellow card) 71' | Stadium: Turf Moor; Attendance: 20,938 (2,000 away); Referee: Matt Donohue |
Note: Fixture was initially scheduled for a 19:45 kick-off, but was moved for live Sky Sports.

| 5 September 2026 5 | Burnley | 1–2 | Bristol City | Burnley |
| 15:00 BST | Ekdal (yellow card) 45+2'; Ramsey 56'; Walker (yellow card) 83'; Broja (yellow card) 90+4' | Report | Dickie 82'; Hirakawa 90+1' | Stadium: Turf Moor; Attendance: 20,149 (950 away); Referee: Gavin Ward |

| 8 September 2026 6 | Wrexham | 1–1 | Burnley | Wrexham |
| 19:45 BST | Kaboré (yellow card) 14'; Ekomié 55'; Hyam (yellow card) 84' | Report | Amdouni 26'; Ramsey (yellow card) 65'; Pires (yellow card) 86'; Hatate (yellow card) 90' | Stadium: Racecourse Ground; Attendance: 10,494 (1,267 away); Referee: Tim Robinson |

| 12 September 2026 7 | Swansea City | 3–1 | Burnley | Swansea |
| 15:00 BST | Idah 13'; Yeo 33', (yellow card) 59'; Vipotnik 68'; Lissah (yellow card) 72' | Report | Ramazani 58'; Pires (yellow card) 59' | Stadium: Swansea.com Stadium; Attendance: 16,390 (300 away); Referee: James Bell |

| 19 September 2026 8 | Burnley | 1–1 | Derby County | Burnley |
| 15:00 BST | Igor (yellow card) 31'; Amdouni 34'; Ahmedhodžić (yellow card) 56'; Laurent (yellow card) 68'; Raghouber (yellow card) 86' | Report | Ozoh (yellow card) 67'; Blackett-Taylor (yellow card) 87'; Fuseini 90+3' | Stadium: Turf Moor; Attendance: 19,456 (2,000 away); Referee: Steve Martin |

| 10 October 2026 9 | Watford | 0–4 | Burnley | Watford |
| 15:00 BST | | Report | Larsen 13'; Amdouni 19'; Hatate 25'; Edwards 87' | Stadium: Vicarage Road; Attendance: 17,960 (1,120 away); Referee: Andy Madley |

| 13 October 2026 10 | Burnley | 2–2 | Charlton Athletic | Burnley |
| 19:45 BST | Larsen 36'; Ramazani 57'; Igor Julio (yellow card) 66'; Alleyne (yellow card) 90+4' | Report | Ramsay 50'; Coventry (yellow card) 62'; Mesík 90+6' | Stadium: Turf Moor; Attendance: 19,408 (1,100 away); Referee: Anthony Backhouse |

| 16 October 2026 11 | Burnley | 1–2 | Wolverhampton Wanderers | Burnley |
| 20:00 BST | Vardy 20'; Hatate (yellow card) 63'; Walker (yellow card) 90' | Report | López 39'; Neave (yellow card) 70'; Chirewa 72' | Stadium: Turf Moor; Attendance: 19,655 (2,000 away); Referee: Lewis Smith |
Note: Fixture was initially scheduled for 17 October, but was moved for live Sky Sports broadcast.

| 24 October 2026 12 | Lincoln City | 4–1 | Burnley | Lincoln |
| 15:00 BST | House 45+3', (yellow card) 73'; Ladefoged 49', 67'; Jefferies 57' | Report | Hountondji 39'; Coudert (yellow card) 67'; Edwards (penalty missed) 84' | Stadium: Sincil Bank; Attendance: 10,558 (1,410 away); Referee: Thomas Parsons |

| 31 October 2026 13 | Burnley | 0–0 | Portsmouth | Burnley |
| 15:00 GMT | Laurent (yellow card) 39' | Report | Meghoma (yellow card) 39' | Stadium: Turf Moor; Attendance: 18,811 (1,456 away); Referee: Ruebyn Ricardo |

| 3 November 2026 14 | Queens Park Rangers | 1–1 | Burnley | Shepherd's Bush |
| 19:45 GMT | Varane (yellow card) 50', (goal) 65' | Report | Laurent (yellow card) 2'; Ramazani 38'; Sonne (yellow card) 90+3' | Stadium: Loftus Road; Attendance: 14,747 (732 away); Referee: Tom Reeves |

| 7 November 2026 15 | Cardiff City | 5–4 | Burnley | Cardiff |
| 15:00 GMT | Tanner 40'; Bielik (yellow card) 50'; Salech 65', 82', (yellow card) 90+13'; Moylan 75' (pen.); Bagan (yellow card) 79'; Robertson 90+4'; R. Colwill (yellow card) 90+11' | Report | Hountondji 15'; Edwards 25'; Ramazani 55', (yellow card) 79'; Robertson 62' (o.g.); Walker (yellow card) 90+9'; Laurent (yellow card) 90+11' | Stadium: Cardiff City Stadium; Attendance: 19,462 (659 away); Referee: Oliver Langford |

| 22 November 2026 16 | Burnley | 2–2 | Blackburn Rovers | Burnley |
| 12:00 GMT | Ramazani 27'; Walker (yellow card) 30'; Sonne (yellow card) 45+3'; Banel 51'; Laurent (yellow card) 57'; Cullen (yellow card) 79' | Report | Guðjohnsen 31'; McLoughlin (yellow card) 60'; Beyuku (yellow card) 68'; Cantwell 74' (pen.); Carter (yellow card) 83' | Stadium: Turf Moor; Referee: Lewis Smith |
Note: Fixture was initially scheduled for 21 November, but was pushed back a day for live Sky Sports and ITV Sport broadcasting.

| 25 November 2026 17 | Burnley | v | Birmingham City | Burnley |
| 19:45 GMT | | | | Stadium: Turf Moor |

| 28 November 2026 18 | Millwall | v | Burnley | Bermondsey |
| 15:00 GMT | | | | Stadium: The Den |

| 6 December 2026 19 | Burnley | v | Preston North End | Burnley |
| 12:00 GMT | | | | Stadium: Turf Moor |
Note: Fixture was initially scheduled for 5 December, but was pushed back a day for live Sky Sports broadcasting.

| 9 December 2026 20 | Southampton | v | Burnley | Southampton |
| 20:00 GMT | | | | Stadium: St Mary's Stadium |
Note: Fixture was initially scheduled for a 19:45 kick-off, but was pushed back for live Sky Sports broadcasting.

| 12 December 2026 21 | Sheffield United | v | Burnley | Sheffield |
| 15:00 GMT | | | | Stadium: Bramall Lane |

| 19 December 2026 22 | Burnley | v | Stoke City | Burnley |
| 15:00 GMT | | | | Stadium: Turf Moor |

| 26 December 2026 23 | Bolton Wanderers | v | Burnley | Horwich |
| 12:30 GMT | | | | Stadium: Toughsheet Community Stadium |
Note: Fixture was initially scheduled for a 15:00 kick-off, but was brought forward for live Sky Sports broadcasting.

| 29 December 2026 24 | Burnley | v | Lincoln City | Burnley |
| 19:45 GMT | | | | Stadium: Turf Moor |

| 1 January 2027 25 | Burnley | v | Sheffield United | Burnley |
| 17:30 GMT | | | | Stadium: Turf Moor |
Note: Fixture was initially scheduled for a 15:00 kick-off, but was pushed back for live Sky Sports broadcasting.

=== FA Cup ===
Win Draw Loss Fixtures

=== EFL Cup ===
Burnley were drawn at home to Notts County in the first round and away to Bradford City in the second round.

Win Draw Loss Fixtures

| 7 August 2026 First round | Burnley | 1–1 (4–3 p) | Notts County | Burnley |
| 14:00 BST | Flemming 48' | Report | Gibbons (yellow card) 24'; Roberts 42'; Lipsiuc (yellow card) 73'; Evans (yellow card) 90+2' | Stadium: Turf Moor; Attendance: 10,272 (1,406 away); Referee: Thomas Parsons |
| | Penalties |
| | Flemming (penalty scored); Amdouni (penalty scored); Tresor (penalty scored); Hannibal (penalty missed); Walker (penalty scored) | | (penalty missed) Acquah; (penalty scored) Campbell; (penalty scored) Grant; (penalty scored) Evans; (penalty missed) Bedeau |

| 26 August 2026 Second round | Bradford City | 0–0 (4–2 p) | Burnley | Bradford |
| 19:45 BST | Cartwright (yellow card) 44'; Touray (yellow card) 90+3' | Report | | Stadium: Valley Parade; Attendance: 19,686 (5,000 away); Referee: Martin Coy |
| | Penalties |
| | Sarcevic (penalty scored); Gillesphey (penalty scored); Touray (penalty scored); Phillips (penalty scored) | | (penalty scored) Flemming; (penalty missed) Amdouni; (penalty missed) Larsen; (penalty scored) Edwards |

== Statistics ==
=== Appearances ===
Includes all competitions for senior teams.

As of match played 7 November 2026

| 2026–27 season | | | | | | | Career club total |
| Squad number | Pos. | Player | Championship | FA Cup | EFL Cup | Season total | Career club total |
|---|---|---|---|---|---|---|---|
| 1 | GK | (Germany) Max Weiß | 7 | 0 | 1 | 8 | 15 |
| 2 | DF | (England) Kyle Walker | 13 | 0 | 1+1 | 14+1 | 51 |
| 3 | DF | (England) Max Alleyne | 11+1 | 0 | 0 | 11+1 | 12 |
| 5 | MF | (Japan) Reo Hatate | 9+2 | 0 | 0 | 9+2 | 11 |
| 6 | DF | (England) Bashir Humphreys | 2 | 0 | 1 | 3 | 53 |
| 7 | FW | (Denmark) Jacob Bruun Larsen | 8+1 | 0 | 1+1 | 9+2 | 77 |
| 8 | MF | (France) Ugo Raghouber | 5+5 | 0 | 2 | 7+5 | 12 |
| 9 | FW | (England) Jamie Vardy | 4+3 | 0 | 0 | 4+3 | 7 |
| 10 | FW | (Cyprus) Marcus Edwards | 6+5 | 0 | 1+1 | 7+6 | 55 |
| 11 | FW | (Switzerland) Zeki Amdouni | 5+5 | 0 | 1+1 | 6+6 | 55 |
| 12 | FW | (Kazakhstan) Dastan Satpayev | 3+3 | 0 | 1 | 4+3 | 7 |
| 14 | DF | (Wales) Connor Roberts | 5+3 | 0 | 1+1 | 6+4 | 140 |
| 15 | DF | (Bosnia and Herzegovina) Anel Ahmedhodžić | 5+1 | 0 | 1 | 6+1 | 7 |
| 17 | FW | (Benin) Andréas Hountondji | 5+5 | 0 | 0 | 5+5 | 20 |
| 18 | DF | (Sweden) Hjalmar Ekdal | 7+2 | 0 | 1 | 8+2 | 50 |
| 19 | FW | (Belgium) Largie Ramazani | 10+2 | 0 | 0 | 10+2 | 12 |
| 21 | MF | (England) Aaron Ramsey | 6+4 | 0 | 1 | 7+4 | 30 |
| 22 | DF | (Peru) Oliver Sonne | 6+5 | 0 | 1 | 7+5 | 27 |
| 23 | DF | (Brazil) Lucas Pires | 8+4 | 0 | 1 | 9+4 | 74 |
| 24 | MF | (Republic of Ireland) Josh Cullen | 0+3 | 0 | 0 | 0+3 | 143 |
| 27 | FW | (Albania) Armando Broja | 2+7 | 0 | 1 | 3+7 | 36 |
| 28 | MF | (Tunisia) Hannibal Mejbri | 4+1 | 0 | 1+1 | 5+2 | 76 |
| 29 | MF | (England) Josh Laurent | 13+1 | 0 | 1+1 | 14+2 | 96 |
| 30 | FW | (Spain) Lluc Castell | 0 | 0 | 0+1 | 0+1 | 1 |
| 31 | MF | (Belgium) Mike Trésor | 0+2 | 0 | 1+1 | 1+3 | 32 |
| 34 | FW | (Netherlands) Jaydon Banel | 1+2 | 0 | 0 | 1+2 | 8 |
| 37 | GK | (France) Grégoire Coudert | 8 | 0 | 1 | 9 | 9 |
| 44 | DF | (Brazil) Igor Julio | 10 | 0 | 0 | 10 | 10 |
Players who departed the club permanently but featured this season
| 4 | DF | (England) Joe Worrall | 0 | 0 | 1 | 1 | 27 |
| 19 | FW | (Netherlands) Zian Flemming | 2 | 0 | 1+1 | 3+1 | 73 |

=== Goals ===
The following players scored for Burnley's first team during the season.

Includes all competitions for senior teams. The list is sorted by squad number when season-total goals are equal. Players with no goals are not included in the list.

As of match played 7 November 2026

| 2026–27 season | | | | | | | | Career club total |
| Rk. | No. | Pos. | Player | Championship | FA Cup | EFL Cup | Season total | Career club total |
|---|---|---|---|---|---|---|---|---|
| 1 | 19 | FW | (Belgium) Largie Ramazani | 4 | 0 | 0 | 4 | 4 |
| 2 | 11 | FW | (Switzerland) Zeki Amdouni | 3 | 0 | 0 | 3 | 10 |
| 2 | 19 | FW | (Netherlands) Zian Flemming | 2 | 0 | 1 | 3 | 29 |
| 4 | 7 | FW | (Denmark) Jacob Bruun Larsen | 2 | 0 | 0 | 2 | 9 |
| 4 | 10 | FW | (Cyprus) Marcus Edwards | 2 | 0 | 0 | 2 | 5 |
| 4 | 17 | FW | (Benin) Andréas Hountondji | 2 | 0 | 0 | 2 | 2 |
| 4 | Own goal(s) | | | 2 | 0 | 0 | 2 | |
| 7 | 5 | MF | (Japan) Reo Hatate | 1 | 0 | 0 | 1 | 1 |
| 7 | 8 | MF | (France) Ugo Raghouber | 1 | 0 | 0 | 1 | 1 |
| 7 | 9 | FW | (England) Jamie Vardy | 1 | 0 | 0 | 1 | 1 |
| 7 | 21 | MF | (England) Aaron Ramsey | 1 | 0 | 0 | 1 | 2 |
| 7 | 29 | MF | (England) Josh Laurent | 1 | 0 | 0 | 1 | 5 |
| Total | | | | 22 | 0 | 1 | 23 | |

=== Assists ===
The following players registered assists for Burnley's first team during the season.

Includes all competitions for senior teams.The list is sorted by squad number when season-total assists are equal. Players with no assists are not included in the list.

As of match played 7 November 2026

| 2026–27 season | | | | | | | | Career club total |
| Rk. | No. | Pos. | Player | Championship | FA Cup | EFL Cup | Season total | Career club total |
|---|---|---|---|---|---|---|---|---|
| 1 | 23 | DF | (Brazil) Lucas Pires | 5 | 0 | 0 | 5 | 7 |
| 2 | 5 | MF | (Japan) Reo Hatate | 2 | 0 | 0 | 2 | 2 |
| 2 | 7 | FW | (Denmark) Jacob Bruun Larsen | 2 | 0 | 0 | 2 | 5 |
| 2 | 44 | DF | (Brazil) Igor Julio | 2 | 0 | 0 | 2 | 2 |
| 5 | 3 | DF | (England) Max Alleyne | 1 | 0 | 0 | 1 | 1 |
| 5 | 9 | FW | (England) Jamie Vardy | 1 | 0 | 0 | 1 | 1 |
| 5 | 10 | FW | (Cyprus) Marcus Edwards | 0 | 0 | 1 | 1 | 6 |
| 5 | 11 | FW | (Switzerland) Zeki Amdouni | 1 | 0 | 0 | 1 | 2 |
| 5 | 19 | FW | (Belgium) Largie Ramazani | 1 | 0 | 0 | 1 | 1 |
| 5 | 29 | MF | (England) Josh Laurent | 1 | 0 | 0 | 1 | 3 |
| 5 | 34 | FW | (Netherlands) Jaydon Banel | 1 | 0 | 0 | 1 | 1 |
| Total | | | | 17 | 0 | 1 | 18 | |

=== Disciplinary record ===
Includes all competitions for senior teams. The list is sorted by red cards, then yellow cards (and by squad number when total cards are equal). Players with no cards are not included in the list.

As of match played 7 November 2026

| Rk. | No. | Pos. | Player | Championship | | | FA Cup | | | EFL Cup | | | Total | | |
| Rk. | No. | Pos. | Player | Yellow card | Second yellow card | Red card | Yellow card | Second yellow card | Red card | Yellow card | Second yellow card | Red card | Yellow card | Second yellow card | Red card |
|---|---|---|---|---|---|---|---|---|---|---|---|---|---|---|---|
| 1 | 29 | MF | (England) Josh Laurent | 6 | 1 | 0 | 0 | 0 | 0 | 0 | 0 | 0 | 6 | 1 | 0 |
| 2 | 2 | DF | (England) Kyle Walker | 3 | 0 | 0 | 0 | 0 | 0 | 0 | 0 | 0 | 3 | 0 | 0 |
| 2 | 19 | FW | (Netherlands) Zian Flemming | 2 | 0 | 0 | 0 | 0 | 0 | 1 | 0 | 0 | 3 | 0 | 0 |
| 4 | 5 | MF | (Japan) Reo Hatate | 2 | 0 | 0 | 0 | 0 | 0 | 0 | 0 | 0 | 2 | 0 | 0 |
| 4 | 8 | MF | (France) Ugo Raghouber | 2 | 0 | 0 | 0 | 0 | 0 | 0 | 0 | 0 | 2 | 0 | 0 |
| 4 | 22 | DF | (Peru) Oliver Sonne | 2 | 0 | 0 | 0 | 0 | 0 | 0 | 0 | 0 | 2 | 0 | 0 |
| 4 | 23 | DF | (Brazil) Lucas Pires | 2 | 0 | 0 | 0 | 0 | 0 | 0 | 0 | 0 | 2 | 0 | 0 |
| 4 | 44 | DF | (Brazil) Igor Julio | 2 | 0 | 0 | 0 | 0 | 0 | 0 | 0 | 0 | 2 | 0 | 0 |
| 9 | 3 | DF | (England) Max Alleyne | 1 | 0 | 0 | 0 | 0 | 0 | 0 | 0 | 0 | 1 | 0 | 0 |
| 9 | 10 | FW | (Cyprus) Marcus Edwards | 1 | 0 | 0 | 0 | 0 | 0 | 0 | 0 | 0 | 1 | 0 | 0 |
| 9 | 15 | DF | (Bosnia and Herzegovina) Anel Ahmedhodžić | 1 | 0 | 0 | 0 | 0 | 0 | 0 | 0 | 0 | 1 | 0 | 0 |
| 9 | 18 | DF | (Sweden) Hjalmar Ekdal | 1 | 0 | 0 | 0 | 0 | 0 | 0 | 0 | 0 | 1 | 0 | 0 |
| 9 | 19 | FW | (Belgium) Largie Ramazani | 1 | 0 | 0 | 0 | 0 | 0 | 0 | 0 | 0 | 1 | 0 | 0 |
| 9 | 21 | MF | (England) Aaron Ramsey | 1 | 0 | 0 | 0 | 0 | 0 | 0 | 0 | 0 | 1 | 0 | 0 |
| 9 | 27 | FW | (Albania) Armando Broja | 1 | 0 | 0 | 0 | 0 | 0 | 0 | 0 | 0 | 1 | 0 | 0 |
| 9 | 28 | MF | (Tunisia) Hannibal Mejbri | 1 | 0 | 0 | 0 | 0 | 0 | 0 | 0 | 0 | 1 | 0 | 0 |
| 9 | 37 | GK | (France) Grégoire Coudert | 1 | 0 | 0 | 0 | 0 | 0 | 0 | 0 | 0 | 1 | 0 | 0 |
| Total | | | | 30 | 1 | 0 | 0 | 0 | 0 | 1 | 0 | 0 | 31 | 1 | 0 |

=== Clean sheets ===
Includes all competitions for senior teams.

As of match played 7 November 2026

| 2025–26 season | | | | | | | | Career club total |
| Rk. | No. | Goalkeeper | Championship | FA Cup | EFL Cup | Season total | Season percentage | Career club total |
|---|---|---|---|---|---|---|---|---|
| 1 | 37 | (France) Grégoire Coudert | 2 | 0 | 1 | 3 | 33% (3/9) | 3 |
| 2 | 1 | (Germany) Max Weiß | 0 | 0 | 0 | 0 | 0% (0/8) | 0 |
| Total | | | 2 | 0 | 1 | 3 | 18% (3/17) | |
