= Max Alleyne =

English footballer (born 2005)

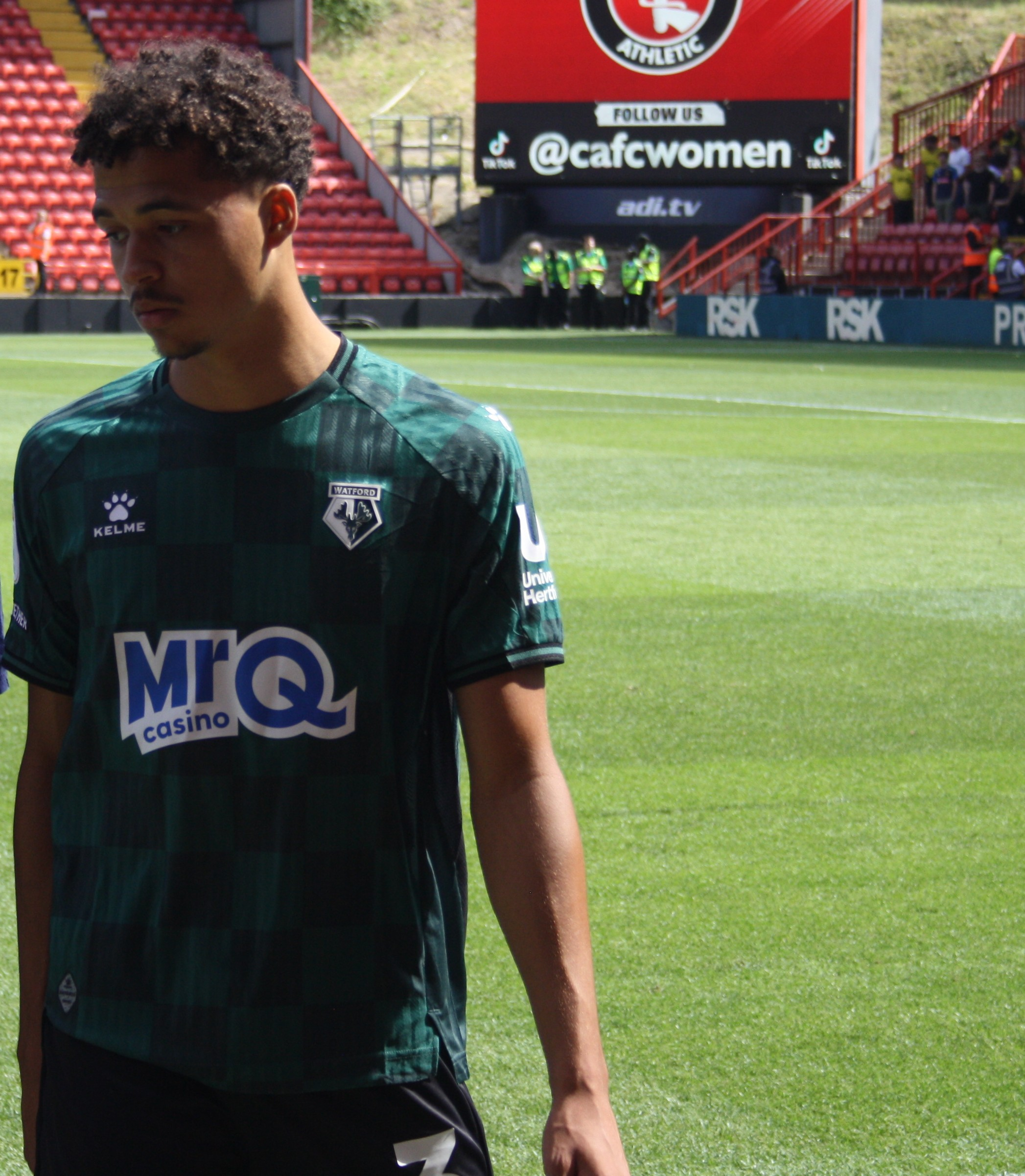
- Alleyne with Watford in 2025

Personal information
- Full name: Max Lewis Rowe Alleyne
- Date of birth: 21 July 2005 (age 21)
- Place of birth: Bath, England
- Height: 6 ft 1 in (1.85 m)
- Position: Centre-back

Team information
- Current team: Burnley (on loan from Manchester City)
- Number: 3

Youth career
- 2013–2021: Southampton
- 2021–2023: Manchester City

Senior career*
Years	Team	Apps	(Gls)
2023–	Manchester City	2	(0)
2025–2026	→ Watford (loan)	16	(0)
2026–	→ Burnley (loan)	12	(0)

International career^{‡}
2022	England U17	2	(0)
2022–2023	England U18	5	(0)
2023	England U19	8	(0)
2024–2025	England U20	6	(0)
2025–	England U21	8	(1)
- * Club domestic league appearances and goals as of 09:09, 27 October 2026 (UTC) ‡ National team caps and goals as of 08:41, 9 October 2026 (UTC)

Max Lewis Rowe Alleyne (born 21 July 2005) is an English professional footballer who plays as a centre-back for EFL Championship club Burnley, on loan from Premier League club Manchester City.

== Early and personal life ==
Max Lewis Rowe Alleyne was born on 21 July 2005 in Bristol. He is the son of former England and Gloucestershire cricketer Mark Alleyne.

== Club career ==
Alleyne is a centre back. He made his debut for the Southampton under-18 team during the 2020–21 season whilst still 15 years old. He left the Southampton academy to join Manchester City in 2021 for a £1.5 million fee which reportedly also included a sell-on clause up to 20%. He signed his first professional contract with City in July 2022.

Alleyne was included in the City first-team squad on 13 December 2023, being named as on the substitutes' bench for the UEFA Champions League match against Crvena Zvezda. On 26 December 2024, Alleyne was included in City's matchday squad to face Everton in the Premier League being an unused substitute in the match. Despite suffering injury on international duty with the England youth side, in May 2025 he was named Manchester City U21 Player of the Year.

On 8 August 2025, Alleyne joined Championship side Watford on a season-long loan deal. On the next day, he made his debut for the club, coming on as a substitute in the 87th minute of the opening game of the season, which Watford lost 1–0 against Charlton Athletic.

Alleyne was recalled to Manchester City on 5 January 2026 to provide cover for the long-term injuries sustained by Rúben Dias and Joško Gvardiol. Two days later, on 7 January, he made his first-team debut, delivering an impressive performance in a 1–1 draw against Brighton & Hove Albion at the Etihad Stadium. His breakthrough week continued on 10 January, when he scored his first goal for the club on his FA Cup debut in a third-round tie against Exeter City, which ended in a 10–1 victory.

Alleyne though was heavily criticised for his performance on 20 January 2026 in a Champions's League game at Bodo/Glimt, where bad individual errors led to two goals for the Norwegian side in a 3–1 victory.

On 14 August 2026, Alleyne joined recently relegated Championship side Burnley on a season-long loan deal.

== International career ==
Having represented England at various age groups, Alleyne is also eligible to play for Barbados.

On 10 September 2024, Alleyne made his England U20 debut during a 2–0 win over Romania at Edgeley Park.

On 29 August 2025, Alleyne was called up to the under-21s. On 10 October, he made his debut in a 4–0 away victory against Moldova.

== Career statistics ==
As of match played 24 October 2026

Appearances and goals by club, season and competition
Club	Season	League			FA Cup		EFL Cup		Europe		Other		Total	
Club	Season	Division	Apps	Goals	Apps	Goals	Apps	Goals	Apps	Goals	Apps	Goals	Apps	Goals
Manchester City U21	2023–24	—			—		—		—		3 (Note: Appearances in EFL Trophy)	0	3	0
Manchester City U21	2024–25	—			—		—		—		2	0	2	0
Manchester City U21	Total		—		—		—		—		5	0	5	0
Manchester City	2025–26	Premier League	2	0	2	1	2	0	1 (Note: Appearance in UEFA Champions League)	0	—		7	1
Watford (loan)	2025–26	Championship	16	0	—		1	0	—		—		17	0
Burnley (loan)	2026–27	Championship	12	0	0	0	0	0	—		—		12	0
Career total			30	0	2	1	3	0	1	0	5	0	41	1

== Honours ==
Manchester City

- EFL Cup: 2025–26
- FIFA Club World Cup: 2023
