= 2025–26 Manchester City F.C. season =

English football club season

Manchester City
2025–26 season
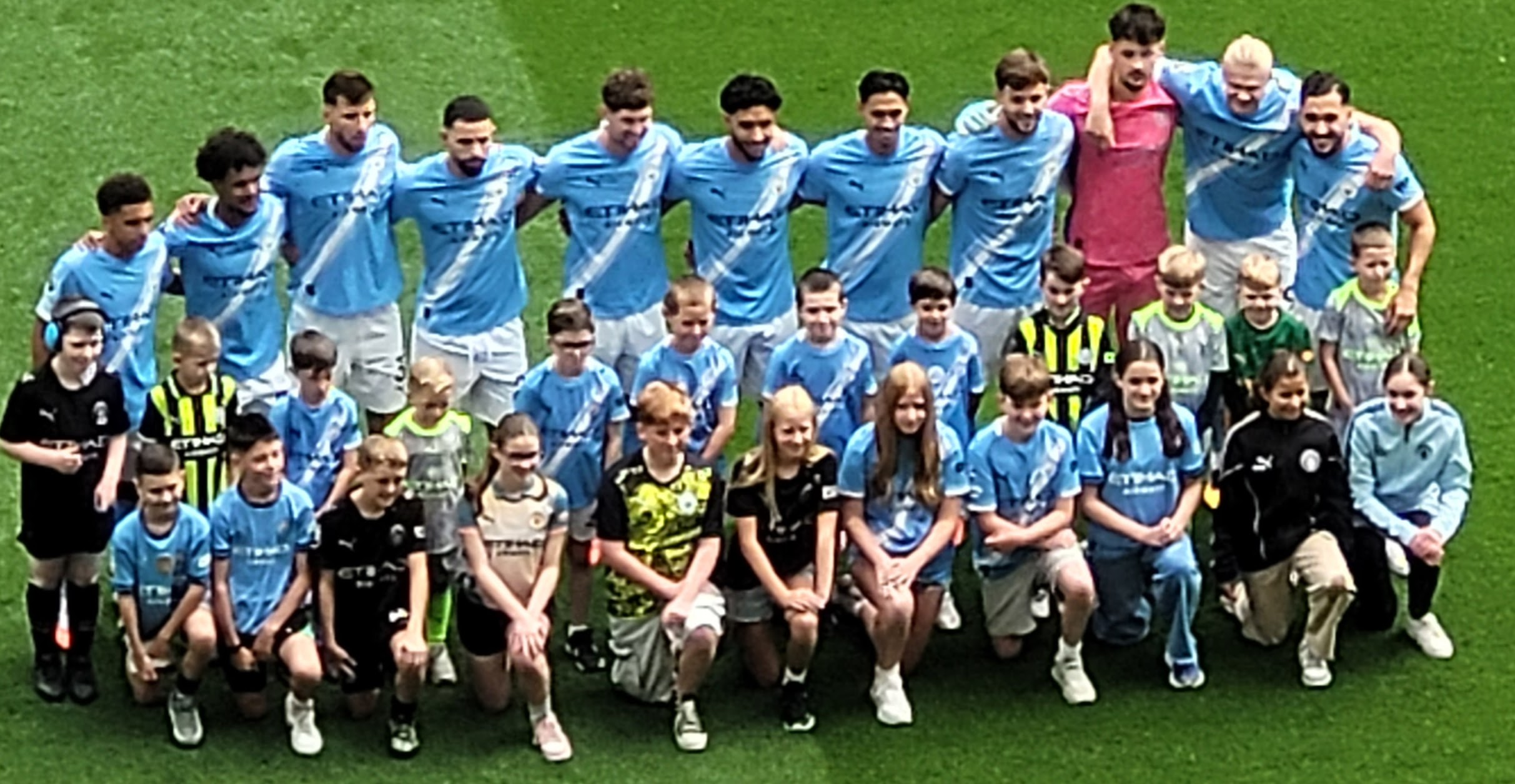
- Manchester City players lining up with mascots before their first home Premier League match of the season against Tottenham Hotspur, 23 August 2025
- Owner: City Football Group
- Chairman: Khaldoon Al Mubarak
- Manager: Pep Guardiola
- Stadium: City of Manchester Stadium
- Premier League: 2nd
- FA Cup: Winners
- EFL Cup: Winners
- UEFA Champions League: Round of 16
- Top goalscorer: League: Erling Haaland (27); All: Erling Haaland (38)
- Highest home attendance: 60,332 v Aston Villa; 24 May 2026 (Premier League)
- Lowest home attendance: 38,254 v Brentford; 17 December 2025 (EFL Cup)
- Average home league attendance: 52,677
- Biggest win: 10–1 v Exeter City (Home); 10 January 2026 (FA Cup)
- Biggest defeat: 0–3 v Real Madrid (Away); 11 March 2026 (Champions League)
Home colours	Away colours	Third colours

The 2025–26 season was the 131st season in the existence of Manchester City Football Club and their 24th consecutive season in the top flight of English football. In addition to the domestic league, Manchester City also participated in the FA Cup, EFL Cup and UEFA Champions League, entering the latter for the 15th consecutive season.

This was the club's first season since 2014–15 without midfielder Kevin De Bruyne, who departed for Napoli following the expiration of his contract, and the first season since 2016–17 without Kyle Walker (to Burnley) and Ederson (to Fenerbahçe). Bernardo Silva was named as the club's new captain after Walker's departure. This also marked the first campaign since 2020–21 which Manchester City did not enter as reigning Premier League champions.

On 17 March, City were beaten 5–1 on aggregate by Real Madrid in the last 16 of the Champions League to end their participation in this season's competition. On 22 March, they won 2–0 against Arsenal to win the EFL Cup for the first time in five seasons. Pep Guardiola also became the first manager to win the competition on five occasions. On 16 May, City won 1–0 against Chelsea, to win their eighth FA Cup title in a record-breaking fourth consecutive final appearance. On 19 May, a 1–1 draw away to Bournemouth in their penultimate game of the season meant City ended their title race as league runners-up to Arsenal.

On 22 May, the club announced that Pep Guardiola would be stepping down as manager at the end of the season after ten years. At the time, he was the club's most successful manager in their history.

== Kits ==
Supplier: Puma / Sponsor: Etihad Airways (Front) / OKX (Sleeves)

Home	Home alt.	Away	Away alt.	Third	Fourth

== Season summary ==
=== Pre-season ===
The revamped 2025 FIFA Club World Cup spanned the period between the 2024–25 and 2025–26 English football seasons. City's involvement in this competition is documented on their 2024–25 season page.

It had been anticipated that City's squad would need a major overhaul in the summer to remain competitive at the highest level after a trophyless season. While this transition began in the previous January transfer window, further changes were expected, particularly in midfield, at full-back and potentially at centre-half if the club chose to offload some of their aging and injury-prone players. Between 9 and 11 June, the transfers of left-back Rayan Aït-Nouri from Wolverhampton Wanderers; midfielders Tijjani Reijnders from Milan and Rayan Cherki from Lyon; and of back-up goalkeeper Marcus Bettinelli from Chelsea were duly completed in time for the players to join the squad for the Club World Cup at a total estimated cost of £112 million. Goalkeeper and former Manchester City EDS player James Trafford also rejoined the club from Burnley for £31 million, after the Club World Cup. Key departures included Jack Grealish, who was sent on loan to Everton. The full squad regrouped for pre-season training at the City Football Academy on 28 July 2025. Fans were welcomed back through a City Are Back open training session at Joie Stadium on 5 August, providing supporters the first chance to see the new signings in action.

On 7 July 2025, Manchester City announced a friendly against sister club Palermo to contest the inaugural Anglo-Palermitan Trophy. On 2 August, a behind-closed-doors friendly at the City Football Academy against Preston North End was played, ending in a 1–0 win thanks to a goal from Rico Lewis. On 9 August, City's single open, full-match friendly against Palermo resulted in a convincing 3–0 victory.

=== Start of season ===
Manchester City launched their league campaign with an emphatic 4–0 away victory over Wolverhampton Wanderers at Molineux on 16 August 2025. Erling Haaland continued his tradition of scoring on opening days, netting a brace with goals in the 34th and 61st minutes. Tijjani Reijnders, making his Premier League debut, scored one and was instrumental in both of Haaland's goals–delivering a dynamic and influential performance.

City next faced Tottenham Hotspur at the City of Manchester Stadium on 23 August. Tottenham secured a 2–0 victory, with goals from Brennan Johnson in the 35th minute and João Palhinha in first-half stoppage time(45+2). Tottenham's disciplined defence and pressing game under their new manager Thomas Frank proved decisive.

On 31 August, Manchester City suffered a 2–1 defeat to Brighton & Hove Albion at the American Express Community Stadium in the Premier League. Despite taking the lead through Erling Haaland in the 34th minute—his 88th goal in 100 league appearances—City were undone in the second half. Former Blue, James Milner, equalised from the penalty spot in the 67th minute after a hand-ball from Matheus Nunes, and Brajan Gruda netted the winner in the 89th minute following a late surge by Brighton. The loss marked City's second consecutive league defeat, raising concerns about their early-season form.

On transfer deadline day, 1 September 2025, Manchester City concluded several significant moves. The most notable was the signing of Italian goalkeeper Gianluigi Donnarumma from Paris Saint-Germain for £26 million, intended to succeed Ederson, who departed for Fenerbahçe after eight seasons at the club. Other key exits included İlkay Gündoğan to Galatasaray and Manuel Akanji on loan to Inter Milan.

Following the September 2025 international break, Manchester City recorded consecutive victories. On 14 September, City defeated Manchester United 3–0 at home in the Premier League, with goals from Phil Foden and a brace from Erling Haaland. Four days later, on 18 September 2025, City beat Napoli 2–0 in their opening UEFA Champions League league stage match. Haaland scored his 50th goal in the competition in his 49th appearance, becoming the fastest player to reach the milestone, while Jérémy Doku added the second against the Italian side, who played most of the match with ten men.

=== Autumn period ===
Manchester City resumed their league campaign on 21 September with a 1–1 draw at Arsenal. Erling Haaland put City ahead after nine minutes, but Gabriel Martinelli's stoppage-time equaliser(90+3) rescued a point for the hosts. Three days later, on 24 September 2025, City advanced in the EFL Cup with a 2–0 victory over Huddersfield Town in the third round, as Phil Foden opened the scoring and Savinho doubled the lead. This was followed up with an emphatic 5–1 Premier League victory over Burnley on 27 September. The match featured two own goals from Maxime Estève, an injury time brace from Haaland, and a strike from Matheus Nunes, while Rico Lewis marked his 100th senior appearance for the club. This result left City in seventh place and five points behind early leaders and defending champions Liverpool.

In their second match of the Champions League league phase, City drew Monaco 2–2 away from home. Erling Haaland opened the scoring in the 15th minute, before Jordan Teze equalised three minutes later. Despite City taking a 2–1 lead into half-time thanks to another Haaland header, they were unable to maintain their advantage as Eric Dier converted a late penalty to secure a point for Monaco.

A further Haaland goal and a 1–0 away win at Brentford on 5 October meant City went into the second international break in fifth place, just three points behind new league leaders Arsenal. Haaland's 12 goals in nine appearances so far this season had elevated him to the top of the European Golden Shoe standings alongside Harry Kane and Kylian Mbappé, and into the list of the top 10 all-time City goalscorers after just over three seasons at the club.

Returning to domestic competition, City extended their winning run with a 2–0 home victory over Everton on 19 October, with Haaland reaching double figures for league goals. Three days later, City recorded another 2–0 win away to Villarreal, moving into seventh place in the Champions League league standings. At this point, Haaland had scored in 12 consecutive appearances for club and country. This streak, and the club's winning streak, ended soon after with a 1–0 away defeat to Aston Villa, marking the third consecutive season that City had lost this fixture. By the end of October, City sat fifth in the Premier League table, six points behind leaders Arsenal.

The Blues started November with a 3–1 win against Bournemouth at home, with Haaland pushing his goal tally to 13 in the Premier League. In the second half, Nico O'Reilly registered his first goal of the season with a composed left foot shot into the bottom right corner. Before the November international break, City defeated Liverpool 3–0 at the Etihad Stadium in what was Pep Guardiola's 1000th game in football management. Although Erling Haaland's early penalty was saved by Georgian backup goalkeeper Giorgi Mamardashvili, he later opened the scoring with a header. Nico González and Jérémy Doku added further goals from outside the penalty area. The result left City second in the league standings, four points behind leaders Arsenal.

After the November international break, Manchester City returned to Premier League action with a 1–2 away defeat to Newcastle United. A long-range strike from Harvey Barnes in the 63rd minute put Newcastle ahead, but Rúben Dias equalised shortly afterwards with a volley. City's hope of a comeback ended when Barnes struck again in the 70th minute, with the goal confirmed only after a VAR review for offside.

In the Champions League, City lost 0–2 at home to Bayer Leverkusen. Guardiola made ten changes to his starting XI for the match, and the German side took the lead through Álex Grimaldo in the 23rd minute, with Patrik Schick doubling the advantage early in the second half to complete a surprise win.

The Blues responded with a 3–2 victory over Leeds United. Phil Foden scored after just one minute, and then struck again in stoppage time to prevent a Leeds comeback and secure all three points for City.

=== Christmas and New Year period ===
City began their busy December schedule with a 5–4 away win against Fulham at Craven Cottage on 2 December 2025. Erling Haaland scored his 100th Premier League goal — becoming the fastest player to reach that mark in just 111 appearances — and Phil Foden scored twice as City moved within two points of the league leaders, before holding on following a late Fulham fightback after they had led by four goals.

On 6 December, City recorded a 3–0 home win over Sunderland in the Premier League, with goals from Rúben Dias, Joško Gvardiol and Phil Foden, narrowing the gap to the top of the table.

In the Champions League on 10 December, the Blues secured a 2–1 victory at Real Madrid in the league phase, coming from behind with an equaliser from Nico O'Reilly and a Haaland penalty to take the win at the Santiago Bernabéu.

On 14 December, Manchester City continued their Premier League campaign with a 3–0 away win against Crystal Palace, with Haaland scoring twice and Foden adding a goal to keep pressure on league leaders Arsenal.

City's festive run concluded with mixed results at the start of 2026. A 0–0 draw away to Sunderland on New Year's Day halted their winning momentum after eight consecutive victories in all competitions; before two consecutive 1–1 home draws against Chelsea and Brighton on 4 January and 7 January respectively saw City drop further ground in the title race; conceding a 94th-minute equaliser in the former fixture. Despite scoring first and dominating possession and territory in both games, Guardiola's side were unable to convert their chances, leaving them second in the Premier League table, six points behind leaders Arsenal after 21 matches. Preparations also continued for the upcoming EFL Cup semi-final against Newcastle United, following December's 2–0 quarter-final victory over Brentford.

Off the pitch, the club were rumoured to be active in the winter transfer window, reaching agreement to sign in form Ghanaian winger Antoine Semenyo from Bournemouth for his short-term £65 million release fee, a deal which was concluded on 9 January; and were rumoured to also be in discussions to sign England defender Marc Guéhi from Crystal Palace. A deal that had been predicated by long-term injuries to first-choice centre-halves Rúben Dias and Joško Gvardiol in the Chelsea game. That deal was concluded on 19 January for a reported £20 million fee.

Semenyo immediately made his City debut on 10 January in a 10–1 FA Cup third‑round victory over Exeter City, scoring and assisting in his first appearance — the first City player to do so since Sergio Agüero against Swansea City in 2011. In all, seven different City players made goal contributions in the match, including a debut senior goal for Ryan McAidoo and a first senior goal for Max Alleyne.

Following their FA Cup victory, City's inconsistent January form continued. On 13 January, Guardiola's side secured a 2–0 away win over Newcastle United in the EFL Cup semi‑finals first leg, taking control of the tie through a disciplined defensive display and clinical finishing. However, the Blues then suffered back‑to‑back defeats. A 2–0 loss away to Manchester United on 17 January marked their first Premier League defeat of 2026, with the hosts scoring twice in the second half to end Manchester City's recent unbeaten run in the derby. Four days later, City were unexpectedly beaten 3–1 by Bodø/Glimt in the Champions League league phase, as the Norwegian champions capitlized on defensive lapses, and left City needing to win their final league game against Galatasaray to ensure qualification as a top 8 side.

The team responded on 24 January with a much‑needed 2–0 home win over Wolverhampton Wanderers – their first Premier League victory of the year, and Marc Guehi's debut for the club – as Omar Marmoush and Antoine Semenyo both scored, reducing Arsenal's lead at the top to four points. Their month concluded with a 2–0 home win over Galatasaray on 28 January in the Champions League league phase, ensuring that City qualified for the knockout phase last 16 directly as one of the top eight clubs in the standings.

=== Spring period ===
Manchester City resumed their Premier League campaign on 1 February with a 2–2 draw away to Tottenham Hotspur. Rayan Cherki and Antoine Semenyo goals gave the blues a two-goal lead at half time, but a second half brace from Dominic Solanke meant the points were shared. On 8 February, City recorded a significant 2–1 away victory over Liverpool at Anfield. After falling behind in the second half, Guardiola's side turned the match around with a composed display, as Bernardo Silva slid in with an 84th-minute equalizer before Haaland scored his 20th league goal of the season from the penalty spot in injury time. The result was widely described as a statement performance, keeping City within touching distance of leaders Arsenal in what had become a closely fought title battle.

City then hosted Fulham at the City of Manchester Stadium on 11 February, winning 3–0. A dominant display saw the Blues control possession and territory throughout, with goals from Haaland, Semenyo and Nico O'Reilly securing a comfortable victory and further improving their goal difference. On 22 February, City again hosted Newcastle at the Etihad, with O'Reilly scoring a brace to help the team win 2–1 and keep them in title contentions at the end of the matchweek.

The month concluded with a 1–0 away victory over Leeds United at Elland Road on 28 February. Semenyo scored the only goal of the match, and City produced a disciplined defensive performance to secure the three points.

Two league draws at the start of March against relegation threatened Nottingham Forest and West Ham United, looked to have ended City's title race as Arsenal built a 9-point lead at the top of the table

Manchester City's March campaign was dominated by knockout football, beginning with their Champions League round‑of‑16 tie against Real Madrid. On 11 March, City suffered a 3–0 defeat at the Santiago Bernabéu, conceding three in the first half for a Federico Valverde hat-trick which left them with a significant deficit to overturn in the second leg.

The return fixture on 17 March at the City of Manchester Stadium ended in a 2–1 defeat, with City unable to recover from an early Madrid penalty goal and a red-card for captain Bernardo Silva for deliberate hand-ball, despite briefly reducing the deficit through Erling Haaland. The 5–1 aggregate loss brought an end to City's Champions League campaign at the last‑16 stage.

City responded four days later with a composed performance in the EFL Cup final on 22 March, defeating Arsenal 2–0 at Wembley Stadium. A brace in the second-half from Nico O'Reilly secured the club's first triumph in the competition for five seasons, and Pep Guardiola became the first manager to win the EFL Cup on five occasions.

=== Season run-in ===
Manchester City began April with a dominant 4–0 victory over Liverpool at home in the FA Cup quarter‑final on 4 April. Guardiola's side controlled the match from the outset, combining sustained pressure with clinical finishing, and Haaland's twelfth hat-trick for the club, to secure a comfortable progression to the semi‑finals. The result extended City's strong domestic cup form and set up a Wembley meeting with Southampton later in the month.

City returned to Premier League action on 12 April, after almost a month, with an impressive 3–0 away win over Chelsea at Stamford Bridge. After a balanced first half, City took control early in the second period through goals from Nico O’Reilly, Marc Guéhi and Jérémy Doku. The performance was widely praised for its composure and attacking efficiency, and the victory ensured City remained firmly in contention near the top of the table. At this point they were just 6 points behind the long-time leaders Arsenal with a game in hand, and scheduled due to play them at the Etihad the following weekend.

Manchester City recorded a significant 2–1 win over Arsenal at the Etihad Stadium on 19 April, narrowing the gap in the title race. City went ahead when Rayan Cherki scored after a solo run, before Arsenal equalised moments later as Kai Havertz charged down a clearance from Gianluigi Donnarumma. The match remained finely balanced until the 65th minute, when Erling Haaland reacted quickest to a loose ball to restore City's lead. Arsenal struck the woodwork twice in the closing stages, but City held on to secure the victory and move within three points of the league leaders with a game in hand.

City next faced Burnley on 22 April. Haaland scored in the fifth minute from a Jérémy Doku assist, and although City registered nine shots on target, this early goal proved decisive in a 1–0 win. The result confirmed Burnley's relegation to the Championship and briefly took City to the top of the league for the first time since August by the matter of their superior goals scored record. Arsenal would play two more league fixtures before City's next league game.

On 25 April, Manchester City met Southampton—who had eliminated Arsenal in the quarter-finals—at Wembley Stadium for the first FA Cup semi-final of the weekend. Finn Azaz put Southampton ahead in the 79th minute with a well‑taken strike, but Doku equalised three minutes later with a deflected effort into the bottom-right corner. In the 87th minute, Nico González scored the winner from outside the penalty area to secure City's place in a record fourth consecutive FA Cup final, where they would face Chelsea, who defeated Leeds United in the other semi-final.

=== End of season ===
City then resumed league duties on 4 May with a dramatic 3–3 draw away to Everton, twice recovering from deficits through goals from Jérémy Doku and Erling Haaland before Doku equalised deep into stoppage time. A comfortable 3–0 home win over Brentford followed on 9 May, with second‑half goals from Doku, Haaland and Omar Marmoush maintaining City's title challenge. City extended their strong run with another 3–0 victory at home to Crystal Palace on 13 May, as Antoine Semenyo, Omar Marmoush and Sávio secured a dominant performance that kept Guardiola's side firmly in the race at the top of the table just 2 points behind Arsenal.

Manchester City secured their eighth FA Cup with a 1–0 victory over Chelsea in the final at Wembley on 16 May, decided by a superb 72nd‑minute flicked finish from Antoine Semenyo after Erling Haaland's low cross from the right. The win completed a domestic cup double for City, adding to their League Cup triumph earlier in the season, and marked Pep Guardiola's 20th major trophy with the club.

City's Premier League title challenge ended three days later in a 1–1 draw away to Bournemouth on 19 May, a result that confirmed Arsenal as champions with a game to spare. Eli Junior Kroupi put the hosts ahead in the first half before Haaland equalised in stoppage time, but City were unable to find a winner.

On 22 May, after days of press rumours, Manchester City announced that Pep Guardiola would step down as manager at the end of the season, bringing to a close a decade in charge that delivered 20 major trophies and transformed the club's modern era. The club confirmed he would continue within the City Football Group as a global ambassador; and that the newly developed and expanded North Stand at the Etihad Stadium would be named in his honour. City lost their final game of the season, and Guardiola's final game in charge, 2–1 to Aston Villa in front of a record attendance of over 63,000 as the new stand was opened for the first time. This game was also marked the final appearances of John Stones and Bernardo Silva for the club. Both had announced they would be leaving on the expiration of their contracts.

Nineteen current City players were selected for squads participating in the 2026 FIFA World Cup, the most for any club in world football and a new record for the expanded competition.

== First-team squad ==
As of 2 February 2026

No.	Player	Position	Nationality	Date of birth (age)	Signed from	Date signed	Fee	Contract end
Goalkeepers
1	James Trafford	GK	(England)	10 October 2002 (aged 23)	Burnley	29 July 2025	£27.0m	2030
13	Marcus Bettinelli	GK	(England)	24 May 1992 (aged 34)	Chelsea	10 June 2025	Free transfer	2027
25	Gianluigi Donnarumma	GK	(Italy)	25 February 1999 (aged 27)	(France) Paris Saint-Germain	2 September 2025	£26.0m	2030
Defenders
3	Rúben Dias (VC)	CB	(Portugal)	14 May 1997 (aged 29)	(Portugal) Benfica	29 September 2020	£62.0m (Note: City player Nicolás Otamendi was included in the deal, bringing the transfer fee paid to £50m.)	2029
5	John Stones (VC)	CB / RB / DM	(England)	28 May 1994 (aged 32)	Everton	9 August 2016	£47.5m	2026
6	Nathan Aké	CB / LB	(Netherlands)	18 February 1995 (aged 31)	Bournemouth	5 August 2020	£40.0m	2027
15	Marc Guéhi	CB	(England)	13 July 2000 (aged 25)	Crystal Palace	19 January 2026	£20.0m	2031
21	Rayan Aït-Nouri	LB	(Algeria)	6 June 2001 (aged 24)	Wolverhampton Wanderers	9 June 2025	£31.3m	2030
24	Joško Gvardiol	CB / LB	(Croatia)	23 January 2002 (aged 24)	(Germany) RB Leipzig	5 August 2023	£77.5m	2028
45	Abdukodir Khusanov	CB / RB	(Uzbekistan)	29 February 2004 (aged 22)	(France) Lens	20 January 2025	£33.6m	2029
82	Rico Lewis	RB / CM	(England)	21 November 2004 (aged 21)	Academy	1 July 2022	—N/a	2030
Midfielders
4	Tijjani Reijnders	DM / CM / AM	(Netherlands)	29 July 1998 (aged 27)	(Italy) Milan	11 June 2025	£46.3m	2030
8	Mateo Kovačić	DM / CM	(Croatia)	6 May 1994 (aged 32)	Chelsea	27 June 2023	£25.0m	2027
10	Rayan Cherki	AM / RW	(France)	17 August 2003 (aged 22)	(France) Lyon	10 June 2025	£30.5m	2030
11	Jérémy Doku	RW / LW	(Belgium)	27 May 2002 (aged 24)	(France) Rennes	24 August 2023	£55.5m	2028
14	Nico González	DM / CM	(Spain)	3 January 2002 (aged 24)	(Portugal) Porto	3 February 2025	£50.0m	2029
16	Rodri (VC)	DM / CM	(Spain)	22 June 1996 (aged 29)	(Spain) Atlético Madrid	4 July 2019	£62.8m	2027
20	Bernardo Silva (C)	CM / AM / LW / RW	(Portugal)	10 August 1994 (aged 31)	(France) Monaco	1 July 2017	£43.5m	2026
26	Savinho	RW / LW	(Brazil)	10 April 2004 (aged 22)	(France) Troyes	18 July 2024	£21.0m	2031
27	Matheus Nunes	CM / AM / DM / LW / RW / RB	(Portugal)	27 August 1998 (aged 27)	Wolverhampton Wanderers	1 September 2023	£53.0m	2028
33	Nico O'Reilly	CM / AM / LW / RW / LB	(England)	21 March 2005 (aged 21)	Academy	1 July 2022	—N/a	2030
41	Sverre Nypan	DM / CM	(Norway)	19 December 2006 (aged 19)	(Norway) Rosenborg	17 July 2025	£12.5m	2030
42	Antoine Semenyo	LW / RW	(Ghana)	7 January 2000 (aged 26)	Bournemouth	9 January 2026	£64.0m	2031
47	Phil Foden	AM / LW / RW / ST	(England)	28 May 2000 (aged 26)	Academy	1 July 2017	—N/a	2027
Forwards
7	Omar Marmoush	ST / AM / LW / RW / SS	(Egypt)	7 February 1999 (aged 27)	(Germany) Eintracht Frankfurt	23 January 2025	£59.0m	2029
9	Erling Haaland (VC)	ST	(Norway)	21 July 2000 (aged 25)	(Germany) Borussia Dortmund	1 July 2022	£51.2m	2034

Includes first team players and EDS players who train routinely with the first team and have made at least one league appearance.
Ages are as of the end of the 2025-26 season (end May 2026)

Key

# – Current EDS Squad player.
† – Signed in January window.
‡ – Initially signed to Academy team.

== Transfers and contracts ==
=== Transfers in ===
Date	Pos.	No.	Player	From	Fee	Team	Ref.
9 June 2025	LB	21	(Algeria) Rayan Aït-Nouri (Note: Transfer for the 2025–26 season, but eligible to start in 2024–25 for the 2025 FIFA Club World Cup)	Wolverhampton Wanderers	£31,800,000	First team	
10 June 2025	GK	13	(England) Marcus Bettinelli	Chelsea	Undisclosed	First team	
10 June 2025	RW	10	(France) Rayan Cherki	(France) Lyon	£34,000,000	First team	
11 June 2025	CM	4	(Netherlands) Tijjani Reijnders	(Italy) AC Milan	£46,300,000	First team	
17 July 2025	CM	41	(Norway) Sverre Nypan	(Norway) Rosenborg	£12,500,000	First team	
23 July 2025	FW	—	(Scotland) Caelan Cadamarteri	Sheffield Wednesday	Undisclosed	Academy	
29 July 2025	GK	1	(England) James Trafford	Burnley	£31,000,000	First team	
2 September 2025	GK	25	(Italy) Gianluigi Donnarumma	(France) Paris Saint-Germain	£26,000,000	First team	
9 January 2026	RW	42	(Ghana) Antoine Semenyo	Bournemouth	£64,000,000	First team	
19 January 2026	CB	15	(England) Marc Guéhi	Crystal Palace	£20,000,000	First team	
Total					£265,600,000		

=== Loaned in ===
Date	Pos.	No.	Player	Loaned from	On loan until	Team	Ref.

=== Transfers out ===
Date	Pos.	No.	Player	To	Fee	Team	Ref.
1 June 2025 (Note: The transfer was announced on 28 May 2025, and became official on 1 June when the transfer window reopened.)	DM	56	(England) Jacob Wright	Norwich City	£2,300,000	Academy	
30 June 2025	FW	37	(Brazil) Kayky	(Brazil) Bahia	Undisclosed	Academy	
1 July 2025 (Note: The transfer was announced on 10 October 2024, and became official on 1 July 2025 when the Bundesliga transfer window reopened.)	RB	39	(Brazil) Yan Couto	(Germany) Borussia Dortmund	£25,200,000	First team	
5 July 2025	RB	2	(England) Kyle Walker	Burnley	£5,000,000	First team	
10 July 2025	DF	—	(Wales) Jaden Lienou	Leeds United	Undisclosed	Academy	
18 July 2025	DM	32	(Argentina) Máximo Perrone	(Italy) Como	£13,000,000	First team	
27 July 2025	FW	85	(Germany) Farid Alfa-Ruprecht	(Germany) Bayer Leverkusen	£5,000,000	Academy	
16 August 2025	MF	87	(England) James McAtee	Nottingham Forest	£30,000,000	First team	
21 August 2025	DF	86	(England) Callum Doyle	Wrexham	£7,500,000	Academy	
25 August 2025	GK	88	(England) True Grant	Stoke City	Undisclosed	Academy	
2 September 2025	GK	31	(Brazil) Ederson	(Turkey) Fenerbahçe	£12,000,000	First team	
2 September 2025	MF	19	(Germany) İlkay Gündoğan	(Turkey) Galatasaray	Free	First team	
4 September 2025	MF	57	(Hungary) Michael Okeke	(Hungary) Puskás Akadémia	Undisclosed	Academy	
16 January 2026	FW	65	(England) Will Dickson	Chesterfield	Undisclosed	Academy	
17 January 2026	DF	70	(England) Jadel Katongo	(Turkey) Kayserispor	Undisclosed	Academy	
29 January 2026	DF	54	(England) Seb Naylor	Bristol City	Undisclosed	Academy	
30 January 2026	FW	52	(Norway) Oscar Bobb	Fulham	£27,000,000 (Note: Includes a 20% sell-on clause)	First team	
31 January 2026	CDM	76	(Spain) Mahamadou Susoho	(Turkey) Kocaelispor	£346,000	Academy	
1 February 2026	GK	18	(Germany) Stefan Ortega	Nottingham Forest	£500,000	First Team	
2 February 2026	FW	77	(England) Justin Oboavwoduo	(Italy) Juventus Next Gen	£2,590,000	Academy	
Total					£130,436,000		

=== Loaned out ===
Date	Pos.	No.	Player	Loaned to	On loan until	Team	Ref.
25 June 2025	CB	—	(Sierra Leone) Juma Bah	(France) Nice	30 June 2026	Academy	
5 July 2025	CF	67	(England) Divin Mubama	Stoke City	31 May 2026	Academy	
7 July 2025	DF	94	(England) Finley Burns	Reading	31 May 2026	Academy	
11 July 2025	GK	72	(England) Oliver Whatmuff	Rochdale	31 May 2026	Academy	
29 July 2025	DF	74	(Finland) Tomas Galvez	(Netherlands) Cambuur	30 June 2026	Academy	
29 July 2025	FW	73	(England) Joel Ndala	Hull City	2 February 2026 (Note: Ndala's loan was originally meant to be until the end of the season but was recalled early)	Academy	
5 August 2025	CB	66	(England) Jahmai Simpson-Pusey	(Scotland) Celtic	5 January 2026 (Note: Simpson-Pusey's and Alleyne's loans were originally agreed until end of season, but were recalled early.)	Academy	
8 August 2025	CB	68	(England) Max Alleyne	Watford	5 January 2026	Academy	
8 August 2025	CB	22	(Brazil) Vitor Reis	(Spain) Girona	30 June 2026	First team	
12 August 2025	LW	10	(England) Jack Grealish	Everton	31 May 2026	First team	
19 August 2025	CM	41	(Norway) Sverre Nypan	Middlesbrough	2 February 2026 (Note: On 2 February, Nypan's initial season-long at Middlesbrough was terminated)	First team	
21 August 2025	CAM	30	(Argentina) Claudio Echeverri	(Germany) Bayer Leverkusen	20 December 2025 (Note: Echeverri's loan was originally agreed until end of season, but was terminated early by mutual consent due to lack of game time)	First team	
1 September 2025	CDM	76	(Spain) Mahamadou Susoho	(Scotland) Livingston	31 January 2026 (Note: On 31 January, Susoho was recalled from his season-long loan at Livingston and subsequently joined Kocaelispor)	Academy	
1 September 2025	DF	95	(England) Lakyle Samuel	Bromley	31 May 2026	Academy	
1 September 2025	FW	65	(England) Will Dickson	Chesterfield	5 January 2026	Academy	
1 September 2025	DF	78	(Burkina Faso) Issa Kaboré	Wrexham	31 May 2026	City Football Group	
2 September 2025	DF	25	(Switzerland) Manuel Akanji	(Italy) Inter Milan	30 June 2026	First team	
3 September 2025	FW	–	(England) Luca Fletcher	Ipswich Town	31 May 2026	Academy	
8 September 2025	DF	97	(England) Josh Wilson-Esbrand	(Poland) Radomiak Radom	30 June 2026	First team	
6 January 2026	CB	66	(England) Jahmai Simpson-Pusey	(Germany) 1. FC Köln	30 June 2026	Academy	
9 January 2026	MF	99	(Scotland) Emilio Lawrence	Luton Town	31 May 2026	Academy	
16 January 2026	CM	81	(England) Jaden Heskey	Sheffield Wednesday	31 May 2026	Academy	
18 January 2026	CAM	30	(Argentina) Claudio Echeverri	(Spain) Girona	30 June 2026	First team	
30 January 2026	DF	91	(England) Stephen Mfuni	Watford	31 May 2026	Academy	
2 February 2026	MF	44	(England) Kalvin Phillips	Sheffield United	31 May 2026	First team	
2 February 2026	FW	73	(England) Joel Ndala	Sheffield Wednesday	31 May 2026	Academy	
2 February 2026	MF	63	(England) Divine Mukasa	Leicester City	31 May 2026	Academy	

=== Released ===
Date	Pos.	No.	Player	Subsequent club	Join date	Team	Ref.
30 June 2025	AM	17	(Belgium) Kevin De Bruyne	(Italy) Napoli	1 July 2025	First team	
30 June 2025	GK	33	(England) Scott Carson	Retired	24 October 2025	First team	
30 June 2025	FW	60	(England) Tai Sodje	Buxton	7 August 2025	Academy	

=== New contracts ===
Date	Pos.	No.	Player	Contract until	Team	Ref.
22 August 2025	CB	3	(Portugal) Rúben Dias	30 June 2029	First team	
12 September 2025	RB	82	(England) Rico Lewis	30 June 2030	First team	
26 September 2025	CM	33	(England) Nico O'Reilly	30 June 2030	First team	
3 October 2025	AM	26	(Brazil) Savinho	30 June 2031	First team	
10 April 2026	GK	13	(England) Marcus Bettinelli	30 June 2027	First team	

== Pre-season and friendlies ==
On 7 July, a pre-season friendly against sister club Palermo for the Anglo Palermitan Trophy was announced.

Win Draw Loss Fixtures

2 August 2025 Friendly	Manchester City	1–0	Preston North End	Bradford-with-Beswick
13:00 BST	Lewis	Report		Stadium: City Football Academy; Attendance: 0 (behind closed doors)

9 August 2025 Anglo Palermitan Trophy	Palermo	0–3	Manchester City	Palermo, Italy
21:00 CEST	Augello (yellow card) 30'; Gyasi (yellow card) 68'	Report	Haaland 25'; Reijnders 59', 82'	Stadium: Stadio Renzo Barbera; Attendance: 34,665; Referee: Rosario Abisso (Italy)

== Competitions ==
=== Overall record ===
Competition	First match	Last match	Starting round	Final position	Record							
Competition	First match	Last match	Starting round	Final position	Pld	W	D	L	GF	GA	GD	Win %
Premier League	16 August 2025	24 May 2026	Matchday 1	2nd	38	23	9	6	77	35	+42	60.53
FA Cup	10 January 2026	16 May 2026	Third round	Winners	6	6	0	0	22	3	+19	100.00
EFL Cup	24 September 2025	22 March 2026	Third round	Winners	6	6	0	0	14	2	+12	100.00
UEFA Champions League	18 September 2025	17 March 2026	League phase	Round of 16	10	5	1	4	16	14	+2	50.00
Total					60	40	10	10	129	54	+75	66.67

Source: Soccerway

=== Premier League ===
==== League table ====
Pos	Team	Pld	W	D	L	GF	GA	GD	Pts	Qualification or relegation
1	Arsenal (C)	38	26	7	5	71	27	+44	85	Qualification for the Champions League league phase (Note: The Premier League gained an additional Champions League place as a result of England gaining one of the two European Performance Spots (EPS) awarded to the two associations with the highest UEFA coefficient points in 2025–26.)
2	Manchester City	38	23	9	6	77	35	+42	78	Qualification for the Champions League league phase
3	Manchester United	38	20	11	7	69	50	+19	71	Qualification for the Champions League league phase
4	Aston Villa	38	19	8	11	56	49	+7	65	Qualification for the Champions League league phase
5	Liverpool	38	17	9	12	63	53	+10	60	Qualification for the Champions League league phase

Source: Premier League
Rules for classification: 1) Points; 2) Goal difference; 3) Goals scored; 4) If the champions, relegated teams or qualified teams for UEFA competitions cannot be determined by rules 1 to 3, rules 4.1 to 4.3 are applied – 4.1) Points gained in head-to-head record between such teams; 4.2) Away goals scored in head-to-head record between such teams; 4.3) Play-offs
(C) Champions

==== Results summary ====
Overall								Home						Away					
Pld	W	D	L	GF	GA	GD	Pts	W	D	L	GF	GA	GD	W	D	L	GF	GA	GD
38	23	9	6	77	35	+42	78	14	3	2	45	14	+31	9	6	4	32	21	+11

Source: Soccerway

==== Results by round ====
Round	1	2	3	4	5	6	7	8	9	10	11	12	13	14	15	16	17	18	19	20	21	22	23	24	25	26	27	28	29	30	32	33	34	35	36	31^{1}	37	38
Ground	A	H	A	H	A	H	A	H	A	H	H	A	H	A	H	A	H	A	A	H	H	A	H	A	A	H	H	A	H	A	A	H	A	A	H	H	A	H
Result	W	L	L	W	D	W	W	W	L	W	W	L	W	W	W	W	W	W	D	D	D	L	W	D	W	W	W	W	D	D	W	W	W	D	W	W	D	L
Position	1	6	13	8	9	7	5	2	5	2	2	3	2	2	2	2	2	2	2	2	2	2	2	2	2	2	2	2	2	2	2	2	2	2	2	2	2	2
Points	3	3	3	6	7	10	13	16	16	19	22	22	25	28	31	34	37	40	41	42	43	43	46	47	50	53	56	59	60	61	64	67	70	71	74	77	78	78

Source: Premier League
W = Win; D = Draw; L = Loss; T = TBC

^{1} Matchday 31 (vs Crystal Palace) was postponed due to Manchester City's participation in the EFL Cup final.

==== Matches ====
On 18 June 2025, the Premier League fixtures were released, with Manchester City starting the campaign away to Wolverhampton Wanderers.

Win Draw Loss To Be Confirmed Fixtures

16 August 2025 1	Wolverhampton Wanderers	0–4	Manchester City	Wolverhampton
17:30 BST	Doherty (yellow card) 67'	Report	Haaland 34', 61'; Reijnders 37', (yellow card) 54'; Cherki 81'; O'Reilly (yellow card) 81'	Stadium: Molineux Stadium; Attendance: 31,118; Referee: Jarred Gillett

23 August 2025 2	Manchester City	0–2	Tottenham Hotspur	Manchester
12:30 BST	González (yellow card) 71'	Report	Johnson (yellow card) 34', (goal) 35'; Palhinha 45+2'; Romero (yellow card) 68'; Richarlison (yellow card) 71'; Porro (yellow card) 81'	Stadium: City of Manchester Stadium; Attendance: 52,491; Referee: Peter Bankes
Note: Fixture was originally scheduled for a 15:00 kick-off, but was moved for live TNT Sports broadcasting.

31 August 2025 3	Brighton & Hove Albion	2–1	Manchester City	Brighton and Hove
14:00 BST	Van Hecke (yellow card) 16'; Milner 67' (pen.); Veltman (yellow card) 77'; Gruda 89'	Report	Haaland 34'; Khusanov (yellow card) 63'; Aït-Nouri (yellow card) 69'	Stadium: Falmer Stadium; Attendance: 31,485; Referee: Darren England
Note: Fixture was originally scheduled for 30 August, but was moved for live Sky Sports broadcasting.

14 September 2025 4	Manchester City	3–0	Manchester United	Manchester
16:30 BST	Foden 18'; Haaland 53', 68'	Report		Stadium: City of Manchester Stadium; Attendance: 52,534; Referee: Anthony Taylor
Note: Fixture was initially scheduled for a 13 September, but was moved for live Sky Sports broadcast.

21 September 2025 5	Arsenal	1–1	Manchester City	Holloway
16:30 BST	Timber (yellow card) 46'; Martinelli 90+3'	Report	Haaland 9'; Silva (yellow card) 36'; Donnarumma (yellow card) 77'	Stadium: Emirates Stadium; Attendance: 60,161; Referee: Stuart Attwell
Note: Fixture was originally scheduled for a 20 September, but was moved for live Sky Sports broadcasting.

27 September 2025 6	Manchester City	5–1	Burnley	Manchester
15:00 BST	Estève 12', 65' (o.g.); Nunes 61'; Foden (yellow card) 83'; Haaland 90', 90+3'	Report	Hartman (yellow card) 27'; Walker (yellow card) 30'; Anthony 38', (yellow card) 63'	Stadium: City of Manchester Stadium; Attendance: 52,427; Referee: Robert Jones

5 October 2025 7	Brentford	0–1	Manchester City	Brentford
16:30 BST	Schade (yellow card) 45+1'; Henderson (yellow card) 70'; Ouattara (yellow card) 84'	Report	Haaland 9'; Nunes (yellow card) 77'; O'Reilly (yellow card) 83'	Stadium: Brentford Community Stadium; Attendance: 17,140; Referee: Darren England
Note: Fixture was initially scheduled for 4 October, but was rescheduled for live Sky Sports broadcasting.

18 October 2025 8	Manchester City	2–0	Everton	Manchester
15:00 BST	Haaland 58', 63'	Report	Garner (yellow card) 39'; Dibling (yellow card) 90+6'	Stadium: City of Manchester Stadium; Attendance: 52,498; Referee: Tony Harrington

26 October 2025 9	Aston Villa	1–0	Manchester City	Birmingham
14:00 GMT	Cash 19'; Kamara (yellow card) 81'	Report	Savinho (yellow card) 40'; Reijnders (yellow card) 54'; González (yellow card) 64'; Foden (yellow card) 80'	Stadium: Villa Park; Attendance: 41,988; Referee: Michael Oliver
Note: Fixture was initially scheduled for 25 October, but was rescheduled for live Sky Sports broadcasting.

2 November 2025 10	Manchester City	3–1	Bournemouth	Manchester
16:30 GMT	Haaland 17', 33'; Donnarumma (yellow card) 26'; Foden (yellow card) 45+2'; O'Reilly 60'	Report	Adams 25'; Truffert (yellow card) 65'; Kluivert (yellow card) 87'	Stadium: City of Manchester Stadium; Attendance: 52,387; Referee: Anthony Taylor
Note: Fixture was initially scheduled for 1 November, but was rescheduled for live Sky Sports broadcasting.

9 November 2025 11	Manchester City	3–0	Liverpool	Manchester
16:30 GMT	Haaland (penalty missed) 13', 29'; González (yellow card) 27', (goal) 45+3'; Silva (yellow card) 41'; Doku 63'	Report	Mac Allister (yellow card) 36'; Bradley (yellow card) 52'; Jones (yellow card) 89'; Szoboszlai (yellow card) 90+1'	Stadium: City of Manchester Stadium; Attendance: 52,511; Referee: Chris Kavanagh
Note: Fixture was initially scheduled for 8 November, but was rescheduled for live Sky Sports broadcasting.

22 November 2025 12	Newcastle United	2–1	Manchester City	Newcastle upon Tyne
17:30 GMT	Barnes 63', 70'; Joelinton (yellow card) 90+4'	Report	Dias 68'; Donnarumma (yellow card) 70'; Bobb (yellow card) 90+2'; Silva (yellow card) 90+9'	Stadium: St. James' Park; Attendance: 52,181; Referee: Sam Barrott
Note: Fixture was initially scheduled for a 15:00 kick-off, but was rescheduled for live Sky Sports broadcasting.

29 November 2025 13	Manchester City	3–2	Leeds United	Manchester
15:00 GMT	Foden 1', 90+1'; Gvardiol 25', (yellow card) 66'; Nunes (yellow card) 55'; Silva (yellow card) 57'; Donnarumma (yellow card) 87'	Report	Calvert-Lewin 49'; Rodon (yellow card) 58'; Nmecha (penalty missed) 68', 68'	Stadium: City of Manchester Stadium; Attendance: 52,483; Referee: Peter Bankes

2 December 2025 14	Fulham	4–5	Manchester City	Fulham
19:30 GMT	Smith Rowe 45+2'; Iwobi 57'; Chukwueze 72', 78'	Report	Haaland 17'; Reijnders 37'; Foden 44', 48'; Berge 54' (o.g.); Cherki (yellow card) 90+5'	Stadium: Craven Cottage; Attendance: 26,700; Referee: Craig Pawson
Note: Fixture was initially scheduled for 3 December, but was moved for live Sky Sports broadcasting.

6 December 2025 15	Manchester City	3–0	Sunderland	Manchester
15:00 GMT	Dias 31'; Gvardiol 35', (yellow card) 37'; Foden 65'	Report	O'Nien (red card) 90+5'	Stadium: City of Manchester Stadium; Attendance: 52,436; Referee: Andy Madley

14 December 2025 16	Crystal Palace	0–3	Manchester City	Selhurst
14:00 GMT	Kamada (yellow card) 62'; Henderson (yellow card) 88'	Report	Haaland 41', 89' (pen.); Foden 69'	Stadium: Selhurst Park; Attendance: 25,166; Referee: Darren England
Note: Fixture was initially scheduled for 13 December, but was moved for live Sky Sports broadcasting.

20 December 2025 17	Manchester City	3–0	West Ham United	Manchester
15:00 GMT	Haaland 5', 69'; González (yellow card) 28'; Reijnders 38'	Report	Bowen (yellow card) 41'	Stadium: City of Manchester Stadium; Attendance: 52,454; Referee: Paul Tierney

27 December 2025 18	Nottingham Forest	1–2	Manchester City	West Bridgford
12:30 GMT	Anderson (yellow card) 43'; Hutchinson 54'	Report	Dias (yellow card) 36'; Reijnders 48'; O'Reilly (yellow card) 59'; Cherki 83'	Stadium: City Ground; Attendance: 30,778; Referee: Robert Jones
Note: Fixture was initially scheduled for a 15:00 kick-off, but was rescheduled for live TNT Sports broadcasting.

1 January 2026 19	Sunderland	0–0	Manchester City	Sunderland
20:00 GMT	Adingra (yellow card) 45+5'	Report	Aké (yellow card) 77'	Stadium: Stadium of Light; Attendance: 46,920; Referee: Jarred Gillett
Note: Fixture was initially scheduled for 30 December, but was rescheduled for live Sky Sports broadcasting.

4 January 2026 20	Manchester City	1–1	Chelsea	Manchester
17:30 GMT	Reijnders 42'; Dias (yellow card) 54'; Nunes (yellow card) 79'; Silva (yellow card) 90+3'	Report	James (yellow card) 52'; Delap (yellow card) 79'; Fernández 90+4', (yellow card) 90+5'	Stadium: City of Manchester Stadium; Attendance: 52,503; Referee: Michael Oliver
Note: Fixture was initially scheduled for 3 January, but was rescheduled for live Sky Sports broadcasting.

7 January 2026 21	Manchester City	1–1	Brighton & Hove Albion	Manchester
19:30 GMT	Haaland 41' (pen.); Donnarumma (yellow card) 60'	Report	Dunk (yellow card) 29'; Groß (yellow card) 41'; Van Hecke (yellow card) 53'; De Cuyper (yellow card) 61'; Mitoma 60', (yellow card) 69'; Watson (yellow card) 89'	Stadium: City of Manchester Stadium; Attendance: 51,728; Referee: Thomas Bramall
Note: Fixture was initially scheduled for a 20:00 kick-off, but was rescheduled for live Sky Sports broadcasting.

17 January 2026 22	Manchester United	2–0	Manchester City	Trafford
12:30 GMT	Dalot (yellow card) 11'; Shaw (yellow card) 17'; Mbeumo 65'; Dorgu 76'	Report	Rodri (yellow card) 45+2'; O'Reilly (yellow card) 48'; Lewis (yellow card) 75'	Stadium: Old Trafford; Attendance: 74,004; Referee: Anthony Taylor
Note: Fixture was initially scheduled for a 15:00 kick-off, but was rescheduled for live Sky Sports broadcasting.

24 January 2026 23	Manchester City	2–0	Wolverhampton Wanderers	Manchester
15:00 GMT	Marmoush 6'; Semenyo 45+2'; Nunes (yellow card) 71'	Report	André (yellow card) 57'; João Gomes (yellow card) 67'; Mosquera (yellow card) 88'	Stadium: City of Manchester Stadium; Attendance: 52,469; Referee: Farai Hallam

1 February 2026 24	Tottenham Hotspur	2–2	Manchester City	Tottenham
16:30 GMT	Bissouma (yellow card) 11'; Simons (yellow card) 38'; Solanke (yellow card) 48', (goal) 53', 70'	Report	Cherki 11'; Khusanov (yellow card) 21'; Semenyo 44'; Rodri (yellow card) 45+3'; González (yellow card) 90+8'	Stadium: Tottenham Hotspur Stadium; Attendance: 61,337; Referee: Robert Jones
Note: Fixture was initially scheduled for 31 January, but was rescheduled for live Sky Sports broadcasting.

8 February 2026 25	Liverpool	1–2	Manchester City	Liverpool
16:30 GMT	Van Dijk (yellow card) 47'; Szoboszlai 74', (red card) 90+13'; Alisson (yellow card) 90+2'	Report	Marmoush (yellow card) 42'; Guéhi (yellow card) 69'; Silva 84', (yellow card) 90+7'; Haaland 90+3' (pen.), (yellow card) 90+4'	Stadium: Anfield; Attendance: 60,336; Referee: Craig Pawson

11 February 2026 26	Manchester City	3–0	Fulham	Manchester
19:30 GMT	Semenyo 24'; O'Reilly 30'; Haaland 39'; Silva (yellow card) 41'; Foden (yellow card) 66'; González (yellow card) 83'	Report	Andersen (yellow card) 31'	Stadium: City of Manchester Stadium; Attendance: 50,717; Referee: Paul Tierney

21 February 2026 27	Manchester City	2–1	Newcastle United	Manchester
20:00 GMT	O'Reilly 14', 27'; Dias (yellow card) 41'; Silva (yellow card) 50'	Report	Burn (yellow card) 9'; Hall 22'; Willock (yellow card) 48'; Barnes (yellow card) 62'; Trippier (yellow card) 65'; Joelinton (yellow card) 89'	Stadium: City of Manchester Stadium; Attendance: 52,187; Referee: Thomas Bramall

28 February 2026 28	Leeds United	0–1	Manchester City	Leeds
17:30 GMT		Report	Semenyo 45+2'; Donnarumma (yellow card) 85'; Aït-Nouri (yellow card) 90+2'; Savinho (yellow card) 90+2'	Stadium: Elland Road; Attendance: 36,838; Referee: Peter Bankes

4 March 2026 29	Manchester City	2–2	Nottingham Forest	Manchester
19:30 GMT	Semenyo 31'; Rodri 62'	Report	Sangaré (yellow card) 45+1'; Gibbs-White 56'; Murillo (yellow card) 60'; Milenković (yellow card) 63'; Anderson 76'; Sels (yellow card) 90+4'	Stadium: City of Manchester Stadium; Attendance: 51,965; Referee: Darren England
Note: Fixture was initially scheduled for a 20:00 kick-off, but was rescheduled for live TNT Sports broadcasting.

14 March 2026 30	West Ham United	1–1	Manchester City	Stratford
20:00 GMT	Mavropanos 35'; Magassa (yellow card) 76'; Fernandes (yellow card) 89'	Report	Marmoush (yellow card) 11'; Silva 31', (yellow card) 37'	Stadium: London Stadium; Attendance: 62,459; Referee: Michael Oliver
Note: Fixture was initially scheduled for a 15:00 kick-off, but was rescheduled for live TNT Sports broadcasting.

12 April 2026 32	Chelsea	0–3	Manchester City	Fulham
16:30 BST	Estêvão (yellow card) 12'; Cucurella (yellow card) 54'; Essugo (yellow card) 90+8'	Report	Semenyo (yellow card) 38'; O'Reilly 51'; Guéhi 57'; Doku 68'	Stadium: Stamford Bridge; Attendance: 39,552; Referee: Chris Kavanagh
Note: Fixture was initially scheduled for 11 April, but was moved for Sky Sports broadcasting.

19 April 2026 33	Manchester City	2–1	Arsenal	Manchester
16:30 BST	Cherki 16'; Guéhi (yellow card) 60'; Haaland 65', (yellow card) 83'	Report	Havertz 18'; Mosquera (yellow card) 36'; Gabriel (yellow card) 83'	Stadium: City of Manchester Stadium; Attendance: 52,523; Referee: Anthony Taylor
Note: Fixture was initially scheduled for 18 April, but was moved for Sky Sports broadcasting.

22 April 2026 34	Burnley	0–1	Manchester City	Burnley
20:00 BST		Report	Haaland 5'	Stadium: Turf Moor; Attendance: 21,259; Referee: Andy Madley
Note: Fixture was rescheduled from 26 April due to Manchester City's participation in the FA Cup semi-finals.

4 May 2026 35	Everton	3–3	Manchester City	Liverpool
20:00 BST	Keane (yellow card) 45'; Beto (yellow card) 48'; Tarkowski (yellow card) 53'; Barry 68', 81'; O'Brien 73', (yellow card) 86'	Report	Doku 43', 90+7'; Donnarumma (yellow card) 73'; Haaland 83'	Stadium: Hill Dickinson Stadium; Attendance: 52,257; Referee: Michael Oliver
Note: Fixture was initially scheduled for 2 May, but was pushed back two-days for live Sky Sports broadcasting.

9 May 2026 36	Manchester City	3–0	Brentford	Manchester
17:30 BST	Silva (yellow card) 36'; Doku 60'; O'Reilly (yellow card) 74'; Haaland 75'; Nunes (yellow card) 88'; Marmoush 90+2', (yellow card) 90+5'	Report	Ajer (yellow card) 80'; Henderson (yellow card) 88'	Stadium: City of Manchester Stadium; Attendance: 52,489; Referee: Michael Salisbury
Note: Fixture was initially scheduled for a 15:00 kick-off, but was pushed back for live Sky Sports broadcasting.

13 May 2026 31	Manchester City	3–0	Crystal Palace	Manchester
20:00 BST	Semenyo 32'; Marmoush 40'; Savinho 84'	Report	Mitchell (yellow card) 52'; Kamada (yellow card) 81'	Stadium: City of Manchester Stadium; Attendance: 51,738; Referee: Stuart Attwell
Note: Fixture was rescheduled due to Manchester City's participation in the EFL Cup final.

19 May 2026 37	Bournemouth	1–1	Manchester City	Bournemouth
19:30 BST	Adams (yellow card) 37'; Kroupi 39'; Hill (yellow card) 59'; Kluivert (yellow card) 90+3'; Truffert (yellow card) 90+6'	Report	Rodri (yellow card) 90+3'; Haaland 90+5'	Stadium: Dean Court; Attendance: 11,218; Referee: Anthony Taylor
Note: Fixture was rescheduled due to City's participation in the FA Cup final.

24 May 2026 38	Manchester City	1–2	Aston Villa	Manchester
16:00 BST	Semenyo 23'; Lewis (yellow card) 82'	Report	Watkins 47', 61'	Stadium: City of Manchester Stadium; Attendance: 60,332; Referee: Andy Madley

=== FA Cup ===
As a Premier League side, Manchester City entered the FA Cup in the third round, and were drawn at home to Exeter City. They were then drawn at home against Salford City in the fourth round, away to Newcastle United in the fifth round, and at home to Liverpool in the quarter-finals. City then played Southampton in the semi-finals at Wembley, and faced Chelsea in the final.

Win Draw Loss Fixtures

10 January 2026 Third round	Manchester City	10–1	Exeter City	Manchester
15:00 GMT	Alleyne 12'; Rodri 24'; Doyle-Hayes 42' (o.g.); Fitzwater 45+2' (o.g.); Lewis 49', 90+1'; Semenyo 54'; Reijnders 71'; O'Reilly 79'; McAidoo 86'	Report	Woodhouse (yellow card) 81'; Birch 90'	Stadium: City of Manchester Stadium; Attendance: 50,705; Referee: Adam Herczeg

14 February 2026 Fourth round	Manchester City	2–0	Salford City	Manchester
15:00 GMT	Dorrington 6' (o.g.); Guéhi 81'	Report	N'Mai (yellow card) 3'; Longelo (yellow card) 80'	Stadium: City of Manchester Stadium; Attendance: 46,774; Referee: Matthew Donohue

7 March 2026 Fifth round	Newcastle United	1–3	Manchester City	Newcastle upon Tyne
20:00 GMT	Barnes 18'; Joelinton (yellow card) 78'; Wissa (yellow card) 90'	Report	Savinho 39'; Marmoush 47', 65'	Stadium: St James' Park; Attendance: 51,109; Referee: Sam Barrott

4 April 2026 Quarter-finals	Manchester City	4–0	Liverpool	Manchester
12:45 BST	Rodri (yellow card) 34'; Haaland 39' (pen.), 45+2', 57'; Semenyo 50'; Silva (yellow card) 67'; González (yellow card) 88'	Report	Gravenberch (yellow card) 24'; Salah (penalty missed) 64'; Kerkez (yellow card) 65'; Konaté (yellow card) 87'	Stadium: City of Manchester Stadium; Attendance: 50,754; Referee: Michael Oliver

25 April 2026 Semi-finals	Manchester City	2–1	Southampton	Wembley
17:15 BST	Doku 82'; González 87'	Report	Azaz 79'; Harwood-Bellis (yellow card) 90+3'	Stadium: Wembley Stadium; Attendance: 70,053; Referee: Craig Pawson

16 May 2026 Final	Chelsea	0–1	Manchester City	Wembley
15:00 BST	Fernández (yellow card) 29'; Cucurella (yellow card) 32'; Caicedo (yellow card) 90+2'	Report	Khusanov (yellow card) 56'; Semenyo 72'	Stadium: Wembley Stadium; Attendance: 83,337; Referee: Darren England

=== EFL Cup ===
As one of the Premier League clubs participating in European competitions, Manchester City entered the competition in the third round, and were drawn away to Huddersfield Town. They were then drawn away to Swansea City in the fourth round, and at home to Brentford in the quarter-finals. A two-legged tie against Newcastle United was drawn for the semi-finals, with the first leg being away and second leg at home. City then faced Arsenal in the final at Wembley.

Win Draw Loss Fixtures

24 September 2025 Third round	Huddersfield Town	0–2	Manchester City	Huddersfield
19:45 BST		Report	Foden 18'; Savinho 74'	Stadium: Kirklees Stadium; Attendance: 22,052; Referee: Michael Salisbury

29 October 2025 Fourth round	Swansea City	1–3	Manchester City	Swansea
19:45 BST	Franco 12'; Idah (yellow card) 22'	Report	Aït-Nouri (yellow card) 17'; Doku 39'; Marmoush 77'; Cherki 90+3'	Stadium: Swansea.com Stadium; Attendance: 20,490; Referee: Simon Hooper

17 December 2025 Quarter-finals	Manchester City	2–0	Brentford	Manchester
19:30 GMT	Khusanov (yellow card) 16'; Cherki 32'; Savinho 67'; Nunes (yellow card) 86'	Report		Stadium: City of Manchester Stadium; Attendance: 38,254; Referee: Sam Barrott

13 January 2026 Semi-finals First leg	Newcastle United	0–2	Manchester City	Newcastle upon Tyne
20:00 GMT	Joelinton (yellow card) 31'; Bruno Guimarães (yellow card) 76'; Trippier (yellow card) 90'; Tonali (yellow card) 90+2'	Report	O'Reilly (yellow card) 31'; Nunes (yellow card) 37'; Semenyo 53'; Silva (yellow card) 73'; Lewis (yellow card) 83'; Cherki 90+8'	Stadium: St James' Park; Attendance: 51,392; Referee: Chris Kavanagh

4 February 2026 Semi-finals Second leg	Manchester City	3–1 (5–1 agg.)	Newcastle United	Manchester
20:00 GMT	Marmoush 7', 29'; Nunes (yellow card) 27'; Reijnders 32'; González (yellow card) 78'; Rodri (yellow card) 90+1'	Report	Elanga 62'	Stadium: City of Manchester Stadium; Attendance: 41,834; Referee: Tony Harrington

22 March 2026 Final	Arsenal	0–2	Manchester City	Wembley
16:30 GMT	Hincapié (yellow card) 16'; Arrizabalaga (yellow card) 50'	Report	Khusanov (yellow card) 32'; O'Reilly 60', 64'	Stadium: Wembley Stadium; Attendance: 88,486; Referee: Peter Bankes

=== UEFA Champions League ===
==== League phase ====
Manchester City were drawn against Napoli, Borussia Dortmund, Bayer Leverkusen and Galatasaray at home, and Monaco, Villarreal, Real Madrid and Bodø/Glimt away in the league phase.

Win Draw Loss Fixtures

Pos	Team	Pld	W	D	L	GF	GA	GD	Pts	Qualification
6	(The Football Association) Chelsea	8	5	1	2	17	10	+7	16	Advance to round of 16 (seeded)
7	(Portuguese Football Federation) Sporting CP	8	5	1	2	17	11	+6	16	Advance to round of 16 (seeded)
8	(The Football Association) Manchester City	8	5	1	2	15	9	+6	16	Advance to round of 16 (seeded)
9	(Royal Spanish Football Federation) Real Madrid	8	5	0	3	21	12	+9	15	Advance to knockout phase play-offs (seeded)
10	(Italian Football Federation) Inter Milan	8	5	0	3	15	7	+8	15	Advance to knockout phase play-offs (seeded)

Source: UEFA
Rules for classification: League phase tiebreakers

Round	1	2	3	4	5	6	7	8
Ground	H	A	A	H	H	A	A	H
Result	W	D	W	W	L	W	L	W
Position	9	8	7	4	9	4	11	8
Points	3	4	7	10	10	13	13	16

Source: UEFA
A = Away; H = Home; W = Win; D = Draw; L = Loss

18 September 2025 1	Manchester City (England)	2–0	(Italy) Napoli	Manchester, England
20:00 BST	Haaland 56'; Doku 65'	Report	Di Lorenzo (red card) 21'; Politano (yellow card) 52'	Stadium: City of Manchester Stadium; Attendance: 49,531; Referee: Felix Zwayer (Germany)

1 October 2025 2	Monaco (France)	2–2	(England) Manchester City	Fontvieille, Monaco
21:00 CEST	Teze 18'; Diatta (yellow card) 63'; Dier 90' (pen.)	Report	Haaland 15', 44'; Donnarumma (yellow card) 39'; Rodri (yellow card) 57'; Silva (yellow card) 88'; González (yellow card) 89'; Savinho (yellow card) 90+4'	Stadium: Stade Louis II; Attendance: 11,275; Referee: Jesús Gil Manzano (Spain)

21 October 2025 3	Villarreal (Spain)	0–2	(England) Manchester City	Villarreal, Spain
21:00 CEST	Pedraza (yellow card) 11'; Mouriño (yellow card) 45'; Gueye (yellow card) 75'; Moleiro (yellow card) 85'	Report	Haaland 17'; Silva (yellow card) 22', (goal) 40'; Dias (yellow card) 65'	Stadium: Estadio de la Cerámica; Attendance: 20,539; Referee: Serdar Gözübüyük (Netherlands)

5 November 2025 4	Manchester City (England)	4–1	(Germany) Borussia Dortmund	Manchester, England
20:00 GMT	Foden 22', 57'; Haaland 29'; Savinho (yellow card) 78'; O'Reilly (yellow card) 85'; Cherki 90+1'	Report	Svensson (yellow card) 15'; Anton 72'	Stadium: City of Manchester Stadium; Attendance: 50,513; Referee: Szymon Marciniak (Poland)

25 November 2025 5	Manchester City (England)	0–2	(Germany) Bayer Leverkusen	Manchester, England
20:00 GMT		Report	Grimaldo 23', (yellow card) 60'; Schick 54'; Kofane (yellow card) 78'	Stadium: City of Manchester Stadium; Attendance: 50,592; Referee: João Pinheiro (Portugal)

10 December 2025 6	Real Madrid (Spain)	1–2	(England) Manchester City	Madrid, Spain
21:00 CET	Rodrygo 28', (yellow card) 87'; Rüdiger (yellow card) 43'; Carreras (yellow card) 88'	Report	Foden (yellow card) 11'; O'Reilly 35', (yellow card) 76'; Haaland 43' (pen.); Silva (yellow card) 90'	Stadium: Bernabéu; Attendance: 76,977; Referee: Clément Turpin (France)

20 January 2026 7	Bodø/Glimt (Norway)	3–1	(England) Manchester City	Bodø, Norway
18:45 CET	Høgh 22', 24'; Hauge 58'	Report	Cherki 60', (yellow card) 90+3'; Rodri (yellow card) 61' (yellow-red card) 62'	Stadium: Aspmyra Stadion; Attendance: 8,016; Referee: Sven Jablonski (Germany)

28 January 2026 8	Manchester City (England)	2–0	(Turkey) Galatasaray	Manchester, England
20:00 GMT	Haaland 11'; Cherki 29'	Report	Lemina (yellow card) 19'	Stadium: City of Manchester Stadium; Attendance: 40,857; Referee: Alejandro Hernández Hernández (Spain)

==== Knockout phase ====
===== Round of 16 =====
Manchester City were drawn against Real Madrid in the round of 16, with the first leg away.

11 March 2026 First leg	Real Madrid (Spain)	3–0	(England) Manchester City	Madrid, Spain
21:00 CET	Valverde 20', 27', 42'; Vinícius (penalty missed) 58'	Report	Donnarumma (yellow card) 57'; Aït-Nouri (yellow card) 82'	Stadium: Bernabéu; Attendance: 76,066; Referee: Maurizio Mariani (Italy)

17 March 2026 Second leg	Manchester City (England)	1–2 (1–5 agg.)	(Spain) Real Madrid	Manchester, England
20:00 GMT	Silva (red card) 20'; Haaland 41'; Khusanov (yellow card) 45+4'	Report	Vinícius 22' (pen.), 90+3'; Mbappé (yellow card) 76'; Alexander-Arnold (yellow card) 80'	Stadium: City of Manchester Stadium; Attendance: 51,103; Referee: Clément Turpin (France)

== Statistics ==
=== Overall ===
Players with no appearances are not included on the list Appearances numbers are for appearances in competitive games only, including substitute appearances.
Red card numbers denote: numbers in parentheses represent red cards overturned for wrongful dismissal.
Source for all stats:

No.	Player	Pos.	Premier League				FA Cup				EFL Cup				UEFA Champions League				Total			
No.	Player	Pos.	👕	Goal	Yellow card	Red card	👕	Goal	Yellow card	Red card	👕	Goal	Yellow card	Red card	👕	Goal	Yellow card	Red card	👕	Goal	Yellow card	Red card
1	(England) James Trafford	GK	4				6				6				1				17			
3	(Portugal) Rúben Dias	DF	27	2	3										7		1		33	2	4	
4	(Netherlands) Tijjani Reijnders	MF	29	5	2		5	1			4	1			10				47	7	2	
5	(England) John Stones	DF	9				3				2				4				18			
6	(Netherlands) Nathan Aké	DF	19		1		3				6				5				32		1	
7	(Egypt) Omar Marmoush	FW	22	3	2		5	2			2	3			8				36	8	2	
8	(Croatia) Mateo Kovačić	MF	6				2								1				9			
9	(Norway) Erling Haaland	FW	35	27	2		4	3			3				10	8			52	38	2	
10	(France) Rayan Cherki	MF	34	4	1		6				5	3			8	3	1		52	10	2	
11	(Belgium) Jérémy Doku	MF	30	5			5	1			3	1			9	1			47	8		
14	(Spain) Nico González	MF	25	1	6		4	1	1		4		1		8		1		41	2	9	
15	(England) Marc Guéhi	DF	15	1	2		3	1							2				20	2	2	
16	(Spain) Rodri	MF	22	1	3		4	1	1		3		1		5		1	1	33	2	6	1
20	(Portugal) Bernardo Silva	MF	38	2	9		4		1		3		1		8	1	3	1	53	3	14	1
21	(Algeria) Rayan Aït-Nouri	DF	18		2		2				3		1		6				28		3	
24	(Croatia) Joško Gvardiol	DF	18	2	2						2				5				25	2	2	
25	(Italy) Gianluigi Donnarumma	GK	34		7										9		2		43		8	
26	(Brazil) Savinho	MF	25	1	2		3	1			2	2			7		2		36	4	4	
27	(Portugal) Matheus Nunes	MF	35	1	5		4				5		3		6				49	1	8	
33	(England) Nico O'Reilly	MF	34	5	5		6	1			5	2	1		8	1	2		53	9	8	
42	(Ghana) Antoine Semenyo	MF	18	7	1		5	3			3	1			2				27	11	1	
44	(England) Kalvin Phillips	MF									1								1			
45	(Uzbekistan) Abdukodir Khusanov	DF	21		2		5		1		5		2		6		1		37		6	
47	(England) Phil Foden	MF	33	7	4		4				6	1			7	2	1		50	10	5	
52	(Norway) Oscar Bobb	MF	9		1						3				3				15		1	
56	(England) Ryan McAidoo	MF					2	1											2	1		
59	(England) Charlie Gray	MF									1								1			
63	(England) Divine Mukasa	MF	2				1				3								6			
68	(England) Max Alleyne	DF	2				2	1			2				1				7	1		
81	(England) Jaden Heskey	FW									1								1			
82	(England) Rico Lewis	DF	11		2		2	2			5		1		4				22	2	3	
91	(England) Stephen Mfuni	DF					1												1			
92	(England) Reigan Heskey	FW									1								1			
Own goals				3				3				0				0				6		
Totals				77	63	0		22	4	0		14	11	0		16	15	2		129	93	2

=== Goalscorers ===
Includes all competitive matches. The list is sorted alphabetically by surname when total goals are equal.

Rank	No.	Pos.	Player	Premier League	FA Cup	EFL Cup	UEFA Champions League	Total
1	9	FW	(Norway) Erling Haaland	27	3	0	8	38
2	42	MF	(Ghana) Antoine Semenyo	7	3	1	0	11
3	10	MF	(France) Rayan Cherki	4	0	3	3	10
3	47	MF	(England) Phil Foden	7	0	1	2	10
5	33	MF	(England) Nico O'Reilly	5	1	2	1	9
6	11	MF	(Belgium) Jérémy Doku	5	1	1	1	8
6	7	FW	(Egypt) Omar Marmoush	3	2	3	0	8
8	4	MF	(Netherlands) Tijjani Reijnders	5	1	1	0	7
9	26	MF	(Brazil) Savinho	1	1	2	0	4
10	20	MF	(Portugal) Bernardo Silva	2	0	0	1	3
11	15	DF	(England) Marc Guéhi	1	1	0	0	2
11	3	DF	(Portugal) Rúben Dias	2	0	0	0	2
11	24	DF	(Croatia) Joško Gvardiol	2	0	0	0	2
11	82	DF	(England) Rico Lewis	0	2	0	0	2
11	16	MF	(Spain) Rodri	1	1	0	0	2
11	14	MF	(Spain) Nico González	1	1	0	0	2
17	68	DF	(England) Max Alleyne	0	1	0	0	1
17	56	MF	(England) Ryan McAidoo	0	1	0	0	1
17	27	MF	(Portugal) Matheus Nunes	1	0	0	0	1
Own goals				3	3	0	0	6
Totals				77	22	14	16	129

=== Assists ===
Includes all competitive matches. The list is sorted alphabetically by surname when assists are equal.

Rank	No.	Pos.	Player	Premier League	FA Cup	EFL Cup	UEFA Champions League	Total
1	10	MF	(France) Rayan Cherki	12	3	2	0	17
2	11	MF	(Belgium) Jérémy Doku	5	4	0	3	12
3	9	FW	(Norway) Erling Haaland	8	1	0	0	9
4	27	MF	(Portugal) Matheus Nunes	5	2	1	0	8
5	47	MF	(England) Phil Foden	5	0	1	1	7
5	33	DF	(England) Nico O'Reilly	4	1	0	2	7
5	4	MF	(Netherlands) Tijjani Reijnders	2	1	1	3	7
8	21	DF	(Algeria) Rayan Aït-Nouri	3	0	2	0	5
8	20	MF	(Portugal) Bernardo Silva	4	0	1	0	5
10	24	DF	(Croatia) Joško Gvardiol	2	0	1	1	4
11	82	MF	(England) Rico Lewis	1	1	0	1	3
11	7	FW	(Egypt) Omar Marmoush	3	0	0	0	3
11	42	MF	(Ghana) Antoine Semenyo	1	3	0	0	3
14	63	MF	(England) Divine Mukasa	0	1	1	0	2
14	26	MF	(Brazil) Savinho	1	0	0	1	2
16	52	MF	(Norway) Oscar Bobb	1	0	0	0	1
16	8	MF	(Croatia) Mateo Kovačić	1	0	0	0	1
16	15	DF	(England) Marc Guéhi	1	0	0	0	1
Totals				59	17	10	12	98

=== Disciplinary record ===
Includes all competitive matches. The list is sorted alphabetically by surname when disciplinary records are equal.

Rank	No.	Pos.	Player	Premier League			FA Cup			EFL Cup			UEFA Champions League			Total		
Rank	No.	Pos.	Player	Yellow card	(yellow card) (yellow-red card)	Red card	Yellow card	(yellow card) (yellow-red card)	Red card	Yellow card	(yellow card) (yellow-red card)	Red card	Yellow card	(yellow card) (yellow-red card)	Red card	Yellow card	(yellow card) (yellow-red card)	Red card
1	20	MF	(Portugal) Bernardo Silva	9	0	0	1	0	0	1	0	0	3	0	1	14	0	1
2	14	MF	(Spain) Nico González	6	0	0	1	0	0	1	0	0	1	0	0	9	0	0
2	25	GK	(Italy) Gianluigi Donnarumma	7	0	0	0	0	0	0	0	0	2	0	0	9	0	0
4	27	MF	(Portugal) Matheus Nunes	5	0	0	0	0	0	3	0	0	0	0	0	8	0	0
5	33	MF	(England) Nico O'Reilly	4	0	0	0	0	0	1	0	0	2	0	0	7	0	0
6	45	DF	(Uzbekistan) Abdukodir Khusanov	2	0	0	1	0	0	2	0	0	1	0	0	6	0	0
7	47	MF	(England) Phil Foden	4	0	0	0	0	0	0	0	0	1	0	0	5	0	0
7	16	MF	(Spain) Rodri	3	0	0	1	0	0	1	0	0	1	1	0	6	1	0
9	3	DF	(Portugal) Rúben Dias	3	0	0	0	0	0	0	0	0	1	0	0	4	0	0
10	26	MF	(Brazil) Savinho	2	0	0	0	0	0	0	0	0	2	0	0	4	0	0
11	21	DF	(Algeria) Rayan Aït-Nouri	2	0	0	0	0	0	1	0	0	0	0	0	3	0	0
11	82	DF	(England) Rico Lewis	2	0	0	0	0	0	1	0	0	0	0	0	3	0	0
13	10	MF	(France) Rayan Cherki	1	0	0	0	0	0	0	0	0	1	0	0	2	0	0
13	24	DF	(Croatia) Joško Gvardiol	2	0	0	0	0	0	0	0	0	0	0	0	2	0	0
13	7	FW	(Egypt) Omar Marmoush	2	0	0	0	0	0	0	0	0	0	0	0	2	0	0
13	4	MF	(Netherlands) Tijjani Reijnders	2	0	0	0	0	0	0	0	0	0	0	0	2	0	0
13	15	DF	(England) Marc Guéhi	2	0	0	0	0	0	0	0	0	0	0	0	2	0	0
13	9	FW	(Norway) Erling Haaland	2	0	0	0	0	0	0	0	0	0	0	0	2	0	0
19	6	DF	(Netherlands) Nathan Aké	1	0	0	0	0	0	0	0	0	0	0	0	1	0	0
19	52	MF	(Norway) Oscar Bobb	1	0	0	0	0	0	0	0	0	0	0	0	1	0	0
19	42	MF	(Ghana) Antoine Semenyo	1	0	0	0	0	0	0	0	0	0	0	0	1	0	0
Total				63	0	0	4	0	0	11	0	0	15	1	1	93	1	1

=== Hat-tricks ===
Player	Against	Result	Date	Competition	Ref.
(Norway) Erling Haaland	Liverpool	4–0	4 April 2026	FA Cup	

=== Clean sheets ===
The list is sorted by shirt number when total clean sheets are equal. Numbers in parentheses represent matches where both goalkeepers participated and both kept a clean sheet; the number in parentheses is awarded to the goalkeeper who was substituted on, whilst a full clean sheet is awarded to the goalkeeper who was on the field at the start of play.

Rank	No.	Nat.	Player	Matches played	Goals against	Clean sheets					
Rank	No.	Nat.	Player	Matches played	Goals against	Premier League	FA Cup	EFL Cup	Champions League	Total	Clean sheet %
1	25	(Italy)	Gianluigi Donnarumma	43	41	15	0	0	3	18	41.9%
2	1	(England)	James Trafford	17	13	1	3	4	0	8	47.1%
Totals				60	54	16	3	4	3	26	43.3%

== Awards ==
=== PFA Young Player of the Year ===
Player	Ref.
(England) Nico O'Reilly	

=== Premier League Young Player of the Season ===
Player	Ref.
(England) Nico O'Reilly	

=== Premier League Golden Boot ===
Player	Goals	Ref.
(Norway) Erling Haaland	27	

=== PFA Team of the Year ===
Player	Pos	Ref.
(Ghana) Antoine Semenyo	MF	
(France) Rayan Cherki	MF	
(England) Nico O'Reilly	MF	
(Norway) Erling Haaland	FW	

=== Etihad Player of the Season ===
Player	Ref.
(England) Nico O'Reilly	

=== Etihad Player of the Month ===
Awarded by an online vote of supporters on the official Manchester City F.C. website.

Month	Player	Ref.
August	(Netherlands) Tijjani Reijnders	
September	(Belgium) Jérémy Doku	
October	(Norway) Erling Haaland	
November	(England) Phil Foden	
December	(France) Rayan Cherki	
January	(Uzbekistan) Abdukodir Khusanov	
February	(England) Nico O'Reilly	
March	(Uzbekistan) Abdukodir Khusanov	
April	(England) Nico O'Reilly	

=== Premier League Player of the Month ===
Month	Player	Ref.
September	(Norway) Erling Haaland	
February	(Ghana) Antoine Semenyo	

=== Premier League Save of the Month ===
Month	Player	Ref.
August	(England) James Trafford	
September	(Italy) Gianluigi Donnarumma	

=== Premier League Manager of the Month ===
Month	Manager	Ref.
February	(Spain) Pep Guardiola	
April	(Spain) Pep Guardiola	
