= Ugo Raghouber =

French footballer (born 2003)

Personal information
- Full name: Ugo David Raghouber
- Date of birth: 13 July 2003 (age 23)
- Place of birth: Clichy, France
- Height: 1.80 m (5 ft 11 in)
- Position: Defensive midfielder

Team information
- Current team: Burnley
- Number: 8

Youth career
- USA Clichy
- 2011–2017: Torcy
- 2017–2021: Lille

Senior career*
Years	Team	Apps	(Gls)
2021–2023	Lille B	38	(4)
2022–2026	Lille	1	(0)
2023–2024	→ Le Mans (loan)	19	(3)
2024–2025	→ Dunkerque (loan)	26	(1)
2026	→ Levante (loan)	16	(0)
2026–	Burnley	10	(1)
- * Club domestic league appearances and goals as of 09:14, 27 October 2026 (UTC)

Ugo David Raghouber (French pronunciation: [yɡo ʁaɡubɛʁ] u-go ra-goo-BAIR; born 13 July 2003) is a French professional footballer who plays as a defensive midfielder for EFL Championship club Burnley.

== Early life ==
Ugo Raghouber was born on 13 July 2003 in Clichy, France. He started playing football in his hometown amateur club where he spent a few years. Raghouber then joined Torcy in 2011 where he played six seasons. In 2017, he was scouted by professional club Lille which he joined the youth system at the age of 14. After four seasons within the youth teams, he signed his first professional contract with his training club in 2021. The same year, he graduated from high school and obtained his baccalauréat while being a part of Lille U19s. He also played four 2021–22 UEFA Youth League matches, starting three in the midfield.

== Career ==
=== Lille ===
Raghouber began to train with the Lille first-team squad in 2022; he was part of professional mid-season training camps in Spain. Between 2022 and 2024, he played several preseason matches with the senior squad. From 2023, Raghouber was successively loaned at lower-division clubs.

=== Loans ===
On 16 August, he first joined Championnat National (French third division) side Le Mans in a year-long deal after extending his contract with Lille until 2026. He played 19 matches and scored three goals, after being injured during the first part of season. In August 2024, he was called to the Lille first-team squad for the UEFA Champions League third qualifying round 2–1 home win against Fenerbahçe but didn't come off the bench. Three weeks later, he signed a contract extension with the club until 2027 before joining Ligue 2 side and Lille's nearby club Dunkerque on loan for the whole season. He quickly became one of the main players on his temporary team, which competed for a promotion to Ligue 1 and reached the Coupe de France semi-finals.

=== Burnley ===
On 28 July 2026, he joined Championship club Burnley for an undisclosed fee. On 2 September, he scored his first goal for the club in a 1–1 draw with Middlesbrough at Turf Moor.

== Career statistics ==
As of match played 24 October 2026

Appearances and goals by club, season and competition
Club	Season	League			National cup (Note: Includes Coupe de France, FA Cup)		League cup (Note: Includes League Cup)		Europe		Other		Total	
Club	Season	Division	Apps	Goals	Apps	Goals	Apps	Goals	Apps	Goals	Apps	Goals	Apps	Goals
Lille	2021–22	Ligue 1	0	0	0	0	—		0	0	0	0	0	0
Lille	2024–25	Ligue 1	0	0	—		—		0	0	—		0	0
Lille	2025–26	Ligue 1	1	0	0	0	—		1 (Note: Appearance in UEFA Europa League)	0	—		2	0
Lille	Total		1	0	0	0	—		1	0	—		2	0
Le Mans (loan)	2023–24	Championnat National	19	3	0	0	—		—		—		19	3
Dunkerque (loan)	2024–25	Ligue 2	26	1	4	0	—		—		2 (Note: Appearances in the Ligue 2 promotion play-offs)	0	32	1
Levante (loan)	2025–26	La Liga	16	0	—		—		—		—		16	0
Burnley	2026–27	Championship	10	1	0	0	2	0	—		—		12	1
Career total			72	5	4	0	2	0	1	0	2	0	81	5
