= Lluc Castell =

Spanish footballer (born 2006)

Personal information
- Full name: Lluc Castell Solé
- Date of birth: 19 September 2006 (age 20)
- Place of birth: Barcelona, Spain
- Height: 1.69 m (5 ft 7 in)
- Position: Winger

Team information
- Current team: Burnley
- Number: 30

Youth career
- 2018–2022: Gimnàstic
- 2022–2024: Espanyol

Senior career*
Years	Team	Apps	(Gls)
2024–2026	Espanyol B	60	(11)
2026	Espanyol	1	(0)
2026–	Burnley	0	(0)

International career^{‡}
2023	Spain U17	8	(1)
2024	Spain U18	1	(0)
- * Club domestic league appearances and goals as of 23:16, 9 May 2026 (UTC) ‡ National team caps and goals as of 20:15, 2 May 2026 (UTC)

Lluc Castell Solé (born 19 September 2006) is a Spanish professional footballer who plays as a winger for EFL Championship club Burnley.

== Club career ==
=== Espanyol ===
Born in Barcelona, Catalonia, Castell was a youth product of Gimnàstic de Tarragona and joined the academy of Espanyol on 9 June 2022 to finish his development. On 26 April 2024, he extended his contract with Espanyol until 2027 and was promoted to Espanyol B in the Segunda Federación. In April 2026, he started training with Espanyol's senior team, and debuted in the Copa Catalunya with them. He made his professional debut with the senior Espanyol team in a 1–1 La Liga tie with Real Sociedad on 23 May 2026.

=== Burnley ===
On 12 July 2026, Castell joined EFL Championship club Burnley on a three year deal for an undisclosed fee.

== International career ==
Castell was called up to the Spain U17s for the 2023 UEFA European Under-17 Championship.
